= Paowalee Pornpimon =

Thai luk thung singer

- เปาวลี พรพิมล
- Born: Pornpimon Kitcharoen (Thai: พรพิมล กิจเจริญ); 2 January 1992 (age 34); Dan Chang district, Suphan Buri Province, Thailand
- Occupation: Singer
- Spouse: Karn Kitcharoen (Thai: กานต์ กิจเจริญ)
- Children: Saendee Kitcharoen
- Parents: Sak Fuengfung (father); Bangon Fuengfung (mother)
- Musical career
- Genre: Luk thung
- Years active: 2010–present
- Label: Grammy Gold · GMM Music

Paowalee Pornpimon (Thai: เปาวลี พรพิมล) born Pornpimon Kitcharoen (Thai: พรพิมล กิจเจริญ) on 2 January 1992, is a Thai Luk thung singer.

== Early life ==
She was born in Dan Chang District, Suphan Buri Province, Thailand. She graduated from Ramkhamhaeng University.

== Career ==
Her film debut was in the 2011 movie The Moon, a biopic of Thai singer Pumpuang Duangjan. Since then, she portrayed herself in the 2013 movie Luam Phon Khon Luk Thung Nguen Lan and acted in the TV shows Saifah Gup Somwang and Trick or Treat.

== Studio albums ==
#	Album
1st	กรุณาอยู่ในระยะของความคิดถึง (Kra Ru Na Yoo Nai Raya Khong Kwam Kid Tueng): Released: 28 October 2011; Label: GMM Grammy
2nd	ในความรู้สึกของเธอ (Nai Kwan Roo Suek Khong Ther): Released: 25 September 2014; Label: GMM Grammy
3rd	แม่ค้าหน้าคอม (Mae Kha Na Com): Released: 27 July 2017; Label: GMM Grammy
4th	PAOLYWOOD (Paolywood): Released: 23 January 2020; Label: GMM Grammy

=== Single ===
- Ber Tho Kon Ngao (Cover Version) (Original : Jakkajan Wanwisa) (2015)
- Ruk Kon Tho Mah Jung Ley (Cover Version) (Original : P-Saderd) (2015)
- Low Soo Lharn Fung (Cover Version) (Original: Sala Khunnawut) (2016)
- Ya Ao Rak Ma Lor Len (2018)
- Ja Ma Mai No (Pa Ti Thin Hua Jai) (2019)
- Pai Len Trong Non (Cover Version) (Original: Pin Pornchanok) (2019)
- Tang Jai Ma Bok (Cover Version) (Original: David Intee) (2019)
- Phut (2019)
- Yak Khio (2019)
- Gin Jub Jib (Cover Version) (Original : Kat Rattikarn an artist from the Lao PDR side, but is well known when Pornchita Na Songkla sings again) (2020)
- Pho Nuea Thong (2023)
- Long Rak Sa Tang Nan (2023)
- E Saew (2024)
- Yom Lao (2025)
- Saen Dee (2025)

=== Collaborations ===
- 2011 – Lom Pad Lom Pay (with Jakrapun Kornburiteerachote and Preawa Pacharee)
- 2012 – Rak Kham Na (with Saranyu Winaipanit)
- 2013 – Num Na Khao Sao Na Gluea (with Phai Phongsathon; original by Sornphet Pinyo and Nong-nuch Duangcheewan)
- 2015 – Pha Lang Ngan Jon (with Labanoon)
- 2016 – Klang Jai Ther Kue Chan Klang Jai Chan Kue Ther (with Pusin Warinrak)
- 2018 – Bun Kao (with Lampholen Wongsakorn)
- 2019 – Rach Cha Wang Hua Jai (with Songkran Rangsan)
- 2019 – Sirani (with Eurnkwan Waranya and Pangram Sivanaree)
- 2019 – Srang (with Lamplearn Wongsakorn)
- 2021 – Mon Rak Kin Jub Jib (with Tai Orathai, Lamplearn Wongsakorn)
- 2022 – Prayat Nam (with Wan Thanakrit)
- 2022 – Chao Arom (with Stamp Apiwat)
- 2024 – Rak Phitsawat (with Kan Thotsana)
- 2026 – Tour Long Wan Thongchai (with Bitoey RSIAM)

== Special albums ==
#	Album
1st	เพลงประกอบภาพยนตร์ พุ่มพวง (Ost.The Moon - Pumpuang Duangjan): Released: 30 June 2011; Label: GMM Grammy
2nd	เพลงแม่ชอบ ชุดที่ 1-2 (Mother's favorite song Vol.1-2): Released: 18 December 2015; Label: GMM Grammy

== Filmography ==
=== TV series ===
Year	Title	Role	TV Network
2012	Sai Fah Gub Som Wang (สายฟ้ากับสมหวัง)	Som Wang (สมหวัง)	Channel 5
2012	Nutgubnut section Suay Jang Na Nong Sao Gub section Tum (นัดกับนัด ตอน สวยจังนะน้องสาว กับตอน ตุ่ม)	Nong Suay (น้องสวย)	Channel 9 MCOT HD
2013	Krob Krua Kam section Kammatep Fuek Hat (ครอบครัวขำ ตอน กามเทพฝึกหัด)	Paowalee Pornpimon (เปาวลี พรพิมล)	Channel 3
2013	Wun Rak Nak Rue Lork (วุ่นนักรักหรือหลอก)	Ka Noon (ขนุน)	Channel 5
2014	Lige..Lege (ลิเก๊..ลิเก)	Jom Nang (จอมนาง)	Channel 5
2015	Mad Ded Sieang Thong (หมัดเด็ดเสียงทอง)	La Aong (ละออง)	GMM 25
2015	Club Friday To Be Continued section Min Gub Mew (Club Friday To Be Continued ตอน มิ้นต์กับมิว)	Kem (เข็ม)	GMM 25
2015	4 Po Dam Chuang 4 Po Dam Karn Lakorn section Kaw Sawart Hard Sawan(4 โพดำ ช่วง 4 โพดำ การละคร ตอน เกาะสวาท หาดสวรรค์)	Issa Bella (อิสเบลล่า)	One 31
2017	Song Kram Pleng (สงครามเพลง)	Piangdao Duangjai (Dao) เพียงดาว ดวงใจ (ดาว)	Channel 3
2018	Aung Kor (อังกอร์)	Sorn Klin (ซ่อนกลิ่น)	Channel 3
2018	Supab Burut Mong Kut Phetch (สุภาพบุรุษมงกุฎเพชร)	Kaosuay Toongtong (ข้าวสวย ทุ่งทอง)	One 31
2020	Kid Hord Tai Ban Esarn Series (คิดฮอดไทบ้าน อีสานซีรีส์)	Suriporn Sroisomjai (Prew) สุรีย์พร สร้อยสมใจ (แพรว)	GMM 25
2024	Ban Lang Looktung (บัลลังก์ลูกทุ่ง)	Kwan Jai (ขวัญใจ)	Workpoint TV

- 2011 – The Moon – as Pumpuang Duangjan
- 2013 – Luam Phon Khon Luk Thung Nguen Lan – as herself

== Other songs ==
- อะไร ยังไง ทำไม เพราะว่าใคร (Arai Yang Ngai Tam Mai Por Wa Krai)
- ถ้าฉันไม่ใช่คนนั้น (Tah Mai Chai Kon Nun)
- หายใจรอใจที่หาย (Hai Jai Rau Jai Tee Hai)
- ไม่เป็นแบบนี้ได้ไหม (Mai Pen Bab Nee Dai Mhai)
- เรื่องนี้ต้องมีเงื่อนงำ Rueng Nee Tong Mee Nguen Ngam)
- สักวันเธอจะได้เข้าใจ (Sak Wan Ther Ja Dai Kao Jai)
- กอดตัวเอง (Kord Tua Ueng)
