= Satien Tummue =

- เสถียร ทำมือ
- Born: Satien Supakun (Thai: เสถียร สุภากุล); 2 October 1969 (age 56); Huai Thap Than District, Srisaket Province, Thailand
- Other name: Sin La Pin Rak Ya
- Occupation: Musician
- Notable work: Prung Nee Kor Luem (2006); Chok Dee Tee Me Ther Rak (2012); Kwam Rak Kam Lung Tam Ngan (2017); Nam Ta Kun Pan (2019)
- Musical career
- Genres: Luk thung
- Instrument: Vocal
- Years active: 2004–present
- Label: Grammy Gold GMM Music

Satien Tummue (Thai: เสถียร ทำมือ(born 2 October 1969) is a Luk Thung singer. He performed many popular songs including "Yoo Tee Nai Kor Ngao Dai", "Jeb Mue Rai Kor Tore Ma", "Hua Jai Puen Din", "Chok Dee Tee Mee Ther Rak", "Kor Apay Tee Luem Cha" and "Fark Jai Kub Duen Jang".

He is also sometimes known by his nickname, Aor or the epithet Sin La Pin Rak Ya (ศิลปินรากหญ้า).

== Life and career ==
Sathien Makan or Sathien Supakun, nicknamed Sathien and under Grammy Gold label, a subsidiary of GMM Grammy, is a 52-year-old Luk Thung singer born on 2 October 1969 in Ban Kra Sang, Pak Mhai Subdistrict, Huai Thap Than District, Srisaket Province, Thailand. During high school at Kamphaeng School, he attended electronic industry and practiced music. He loved guitars and played for the school's international band. He would practice playing in the evening after school with a friend named Pr at their teacher's house. After high school, he attended and graduated from Ubon Ratchathani Teachers College (1992, was bestowed on the title of "Ubon Ratchathani Rajabhat Institute", the academic year 2004 was raised as "Ubon Ratchathani Rajabhat University") and received the teacher service. For a while, he resigned and joined a group of country music artists for life - Lanna, the owner of the nickname “Sathien Thitthathimmo”, currently operates a restaurant and recording room. Thorung, a studio at Muang District, Sisaket Province, has released his first solo album. The dream was reached and he released his first album in 2004.

The last work he did before the break was his seventh album in 2012 under Grammy Gold. He is an artist and a background worker for other artists at Grammy Gold.

== Studio albums ==
| # | Album |
|---|---|
| 1st | อยู่ที่ไหนก็เหงาได้ (Yoo Tee Nai Kau Ngow Dai): Released: 17 August 2004; Label: GMM Grammy |
| 2nd | กำลังใจที่เธอไม่รู้ (Kum Gung Jai Tee Tue Mai Roo): Released: 24 February 2006; Label: GMM Grammy |
| 3rd | ฝากใจกับเดือนจาง (Fak Jai Gub Duan Jang): Released: 27 February 2007; Label: GMM Grammy |
| 4th | โดยสารมากับกำลังใจ (Dony San Mah Gub Kum Lung Jai): Released: 27 June 2008; Label: GMM Grammy |
| 5th | ในนามของความห่วงใย (Nai Nam Kong Kwarm Huang Yai): Released: 16 June 2009; Label: GMM Grammy |
| 6th | อยากเป็นคนที่เธอ...เรียกว่าแฟน (Yak Pen Kon Tee Tur Rieak Wah Fan): Released: 29 July 2010; Label: GMM Grammy |
| 7th | โชคดีที่มีเธอรัก (Choke Dee Tee Mee Tur Ruk): Released: 26 July 2012; Label: GMM Grammy |

=== Single ===
- Rak Fan For (2007)
- Tang Dern Chow Din (Cover Version) (Original : Mike Phiromphon) (2011)
- Yom Pen Tua Taen Kor Dai (2014)
- Krang Raek Tee Sob Tah Ter (2014)
- Yak Pub Pan Fah (Cover Version) (Original : Mai Mueng) (2015)
- Low Soo Lharn Fung (Cover Version) (Original: Sala Khunnawut) (2016)
- Namta Yrod Yung Kod Like (Original : Tai Orathai) (2017)
- Kwarm Ruk Kam Lung Tam Ngarn (2017)
- Kor Tot Tee Tam Hai Mun Pang (2018)
- Yoo Bab Nee Pai Narn Narn (2018)
- Soi Gub Mah Hed Hai Luem (2019)
- Bork Jai YangNgai Dee (Original : Tai Orathai) (2019)
- Nam Tah Koon Paen (2019)
- Won Fau Koon (Cover Version) (Original : Chai Sanuwat) (2020)

=== Collaborations ===
- 2009 – Yad Nguea Puea Mae (with Takkatan Chollada) (Original : Ekkaphon Montrakarn)
- 2011 – Rot Kun Nee Sri Sa Ket (with Phai Phongsathon and Sorn Sinchai)
- 2025 – Ruk Jon Luem (with Phet Kathawut)

== Special albums ==
| # | Album |
|---|---|
| 1st | วันที่ความเหงาหาเราไม่เจอ (Wun Tee Kwarm Ngao Hah Row Mai Jer): Released: 18 May 2017; Label: GMM Grammy |

== Filmography ==
=== TV Series ===
| Year | Title | Role | TV Network |
|---|---|---|---|
| 2015 | Mad Ded Sing Thong (หมัดเด็ดเสียงทอง) | บูม (Boom) | GMM 25 |
