= Kaothip Tidadin =

Thai singer

- ข้าวทิพย์ ธิดาดิน
- Born: Tidadin Hin-on (Thai: ธิดาดิน หินอ่อน); 16 August 1989 (age 37); Senangkhanikhom district, Amnat Charoen province, Thailand
- Occupations: Singer; Actress; YouTuber
- Parents: Winai Hin-on (father); Lampao Hin-on (mother)
- Musical career
- Genres: Pop; T-pop; Luk thung; mor lam
- Years active: 2008–present
- Labels: Grammy Gold, GMM Music

Kaothip Tidadin (Thai: ข้าวทิพย์ ธิดาดิน), real name Tidadin Hin-on (Thai: ธิดาดิน หินอ่อน) (born 16 August 1989), is a Thai luk thung singer, formed and managed by GMM Grammy. She started on stage in 2008 as a singer in a Nongmai Taidaw Season 1 project. She has released 2 studio albums and 10 singles.

== Early life ==
Kaothip was born in the village of Som Sa-aad, Tambon Nhong Sam See, Amphoe Senangkhanikhom, in Amnat Charoen province to Vinai and Lamphao Hin-aon. She finished primary education from Ban Som Sa-aad Nuengkrung School, secondary education from Nawieng Chullawitthaya School and tertiary education from Dhurakij Pundit University.

== Musical career ==
Kaothip began singing as a child, because her father, Mor lam, is also a musician. She was the most talented in her primary school, and got support from her teachers and her parents.

In Secondary 6, Mr. Boonchuei Sangchan, the school director, heard that Sala Khunnawut wanted a new Luk thung singer in a record label Grammy Gold (network by GMM Grammy). Boonchuei called her to record demo-cassette for audition, and she debuted.

After that, Sala Khunnawut wrote first songs for her; The Shy High School's girls (Thai: สาว ม. ปลายยังอายฮัก, Sao Mor Play Yang Ai Hak) and Last Term (Thai: มอหกเทอมสุดท้าย), giving her the stage name Kaothip Tidadin.

== Acting career ==
Kaothip began acting in 2015. In 2017, she played her first television role in the series Nay Hoi Thamin (Remake version). She was cast as Bua Kiew, with Phai Phongsathon cast as Si Ho. In 2020, she co-started in the series Mongkut Dok Ya, cast as Ging-aor Siengsawan.

== Discography ==
=== Studio albums ===
#	Album
1st	สาวหมอลำส่ำน้อย (Sow Mhau Lum Sum Noy): Released: 27 January 2011; Label: GMM Grammy
2nd	O.K.บ่อ้าย (O.K.Bau Ai): Released: 30 October 2012; Label: GMM Grammy

=== Single ===
- Sao Mor Plai Yang Ai Hug (2008)
- Mor.6 Term Sud Tai (2008)
- Jeeb Bao Bao Wao Koi Koi (2011)
- Jee Hoy (Cover Version) (Original : Ki Daoped an artist from the Lao PDR side, but is well known when P-Saderd sings again) (2015)
- Low Soo Lharn Fung (Cover Version) (Original: Sala Khunnawut) (2016)
- Ruk Koon Ying Gla Krai (Cover Version) (Original : Jakrapun Kornburiteerachote) (2020)

=== Collaborations ===
- 2009 – Nong Mah Gub Kum Wah Chai (with Monkaen Kaenkoon) (Original : Maithai Huajaisin)

== MC ==
Online

- 2021 : On Air YouTube: Kaothip Lovers

== Filmography ==
=== TV Series ===
Year	Title	Role	TV Network
2015	Mad Ded Siang Thong (หมัดเด็ดเสียงทอง)	Dao (ดาว)	GMM 25
2017	Nai Hoy Tamin (นายฮ้อยทมิฬ)	Bua Kieaw (บัวเขียว)	Channel 7HD
2019	Sao Noy Roy Lan View (สาวน้อยร้อยล้านวิว)	Nam Tan (น้ำตาล)	Channel One 31
2019	Duak Koon Siang Kan (ดอกคูนเสียงแคน)	Bai Bua (ใบบัว)	GMM 25
2019	Poo Bao In Dee Ya Yhee Inter (ผู้บ่าวอินดี้ ยาหยีอินเตอร์)	Thip (ทิพย์)	Channel 7HD
2020	Mong Kut Doak Ya (มงกุฎดอกหญ้า)	Kingaor Siangswan กิ่งอ้อ เสียงสวรรค์	Channel One 31
2020	Soot Ruk Zab Elee (สูตรรักแซ่บอีหลี)	Kaewta Warnjai แก้วตา หวานใจ	Channel One 31
2021	Nora Saon (โนราสะออน)	Ma Nao (มะนาว)	Channel One 31
2022	Body Gard Morlum (บอดี้การ์ดหมอลำ)	Duangdao Thepsathitjai (Laddao) ดวงดาว เทพสถิตใจ (ปลัดดาว)	Channel One 31
2023	Duak Yah Pah Conkrit (ดอกหญ้าป่าคอนกรีต)	Emi (เอมี่)	Channel One 31
2023	Mile Ko Fon Muan Paun Ruk (ไมค์โครโฟนม่วนป่วนรัก)	Am (แอม)	Channel One 31
2025	Pau Ja Mae Yoo Nai (พ่อจ๋าแม่อยู่ไหน)	Nampueng (น้ำผึ้ง)	Channel One 31
2026	Song Kram Mor Lum (สงครามหมอลำ)		Channel One 31
