= Yinglee Srijumpol =

Thai Luk thung and morlam singer

- หญิงลี ศรีจุมพล
- Born: Nudchanart Srijumpol (Thai: นุชนาถ ศรีจุมพล); 27 March 1983 (age 43); Na Pho district, Buriram Province, Thailand
- Occupation: Singer
- Parents: Thongluen Srijumpol (father); Boonlom Srijumpol (mother)
- Musical career
- Genres: Luk thung; Mor lam
- Years active: 2012–present
- Label: Grammy Gold · GMM Music

Yinglee Srijumpol (Thai: หญิงลี ศรีจุมพล, b. 27 March 1983) is a Thai Luk thung and morlam singer. She is best known for her single "Kau Jai Ter Laek Ber Toh".

== Life and career ==
Born as Nudchanart Srijumpol (Thai: นุชนาถ ศรีจุมพล), Srijumpol in the village of Bong, Tambon Ban Khu, Amphoe Na Pho, in Buriram Province.

Srijumpol signed with SP Suphamit. Her first album was banned by the Thai Ministry of Culture for immorality. When her contract with SP expired, she returned to her birthplace, where she founded a Mor lam band. After the band's failure, Srijumpol moved to Bangkok and worked briefly in a hair salon.

In 2012, Srijumpol decided to return to entertainment. She signed with the GMM Grammy label. Her first studio album recorded by GMM Grammy was Kha Khao Sao Lam Sing (Thai: ขาขาวสาวลำซิ่ง). The album was a success. The single "Your number for my heart" (Thai: ขอใจเธอแลกเบอร์โทร) was released in 2012 and hit No. 1 on Thai music charts in 2013, earning 237M YouTube views as of December 2021. Srijumpol received numerous accolades for the single, including the Siam Dara Star award for "Outstanding Luk Thung Song", and "Most Popular Female Luk Thung Song" at the Maha Nakhon Awards.

In 2017, Srijumpol was hospitalized for thyroid disease and forced to pause her singing career. In the same year, she opened a resort in Na Pho.

== Studio albums ==
#	Album	Track listings
1st	ขาขาวสาวลำซิ่ง (Kha Khao Sao Lam Sing): Released: 30 October 2012; Label: GMM Grammy	Track listing: 1. Kha Khao Sao Lam Sing (ขาขาวสาวลำซิ่ง); 2. Loi Hak (หลอยฮัก); 3. Sai Fai (ใส่ไฟ); 4. Taeng Khang Lang (แทงข้างหลัง); 5. Tao Hua Ngoo (เฒ่าหัวงู); 6. Sao Digital (สาวดิจิตอล); 7. Rueng Chiw Chiw(เรื่องชิวชิว); 8. Pho Chai Lai Ban (ผู้ชายหลายบ้าน); 9. Ying Lan La (หญิงลั้ลลา); 10. Khoe Jai Thuea Leak Ber Tho (ขอใจเธอแลกเบอร์โทร)
2nd	อยู่เย็นเป็นโสด (Yoo Yen Pen Soad): Released: 31 July 2015; Label: GMM Grammy	Track listing: 1. Yoo Yen Pen Soad (อยู่เย็นเป็นโสด); 2. Muea Rai Ja Tham Kab Chan Bang (เมื่อไหร่จะทำกับฉันบ้าง); 3. Yok Laew Bye Bye (หยอกแล้วบ๊ายบาย); 4. Fan Mai Koe Aao Fan Kao Koe Rak (แฟนใหม่ก็เอา แฟนเก่าก็รัก); 5. Kao Jai Trong Gan Na (เข้าใจตรงกันนะ); 6. Rak Na Jub Jub (รักนะ จุ๊บๆ); 7. Noi Jai Proe I Love You (น้อยใจเพราะไอเลิฟยู); 8. Fan Ninja (แฟนนินจา); 9. Roe Sai Khon Soad (รอสายคนโสด); 10. Jaew (แจ๋ว)
3rd	ชีวิตดี๊ดี (Chiwit Dee Dee): Released: 18 May 2017; Label: GMM Grammy	Track listing: 1. Chiwit Dee Dee (ชีวิตดี๊ดี); 2. Chuay Khan Rao Yoo Yaeng Kan Rao Oad (ช่วยกันเราอยู่ แย่งกันเราอด); 3. Chad Chaw (ชัด ช่าว); 4. Yak Yoo Nai Aom Kod Tere (อยากอยู่ในอ้อมกอดเธอ); 5. Khor Dee Kuea Mai Mee Miea (ข้อดีคือไม่มีเมีย); 6. Sam Sib Jeeb Dai (30 จีบได้) (It was adapted from "Sam Sib Yang Jaew", which this is Yodrak Salakjai's song.); 7. Aao Rak Krab Ban Rao (เอารักกลับบ้านเรา); 8. Rak Sa Laew (รักซะแล้ว); 9. Share Kan Pai Thee Rak (แชร์กันไปที่รัก); 10. Ai Lai Jai Si Yai Pai Fang Lao (อ้ายหลายใจสิย้ายไปฝั่งลาว)
4th	ลำซิ่งลิซึ่ม (Lam Sing Li Seum): Released: 17 March 2020; Label: GMM Grammy	Track listing: 1. Lam Sing Li Seum (ลำซิ่งลิซึ่ม); 2. Sak Ngag Ngag (ซักงักงัก); 3. Mai Rak Ya Hueng Mai Kid Thueng Ya Huang (ไม่รักอย่าหึง ไม่คิดถึงอย่าหวง); 4. Sai Bun Terng feat. Uot Pramot (สายบันเทิง feat. โอ๊ต ปราโมทย์); 5. Ying Ngao Ying Rao Jai(ยิ่งเหงา ยิ่งเร้าใจ); 6. Ew D (เอวดี); 7. Sod Ueng Nuk Leng Por (โสดเองนักเลงพอ); 8. Bor Pak Ka Yak Yoo Der (บ่ปากกะอยากอยู่เด้อ); 9. Show Jai (โชว์ใจ); 10. Ka Kao Sao Rod Hae (ขาขาวสาวรถแห่)

=== Single ===
- Doremee (Cover Version) (Original : Pornchita Na Songkla) (2015)
- Rau Ngoo Kao Fun (Cover Version) (Original : Duangjan Suwannee) (2015)
- "Low Soo Lharn Fung" (Cover Version) (Original: Sala Khunnawut) (2016)
- O.K. Na Kha (Cover Version) (Original : Katreeya English) (2018)
- "Thee Rak Ruea Thee Phak" (ที่รักหรือที่พัก) (March 2019)
- Bau Ngued Jak Med (Cover Version) (Original : Takkatan Chollada) (2020)
- "Due Due Duem" (ดื๊อ ดื๊อ ดึ่ม) (2021)
- "Caffeine" (คาเฟอีน) (2022)
- "On Ae Ko Phae Pai" (อ่อนแอก็แพ้ไป) (2024)
- "Term Rak Energy" (เติมรัก Energy) (2024)
- "Phu Ying Thao Thao" (ผู้หญิงเทาเทา) (2025)

=== Collaborations ===
- 2023 – Tam Boon Ruam Chat Tak Bart Kon Lah Kun (with Sax Chumpae)

== Special albums ==
#	Album
1st	มัน ม่วน แซ่บ 2 (Mun Muan Zab 2): Released: 25 September 2014; Label: GMM Grammy
2nd	Plern Original ถนนคนเพลิน (Plern Original Tanon Kon Plern): Released: 6 September 2023; Label: GMM Grammy

== Filmography ==
=== TV Series ===
Year	Title	Role	TV Network
2014	Mad Ded Sing Thong (หมัดเด็ดเสียงทอง)	หญิงยี (Yingyee)	Channel 9 MCOT HD
2022	Ta Yat Pun Kao Nhiaw (ทายาทพันธุ์ข้าวเหนียว)	Boonsita Kumpangkun (Sita) บุญสิตา คำแพงกุล (สิตา)	Channel One 31
	Ruk Koon Tow Chang (รักคุณเท่าช้าง)	See Mai (สีมาย)	Channel One 31

- "Rueam Phon Khon Luk Thung Nguen Lan" (รวมพลคนลูกทุ่งเงินล้าน) (2013)

== Other songs ==
- คนบ่ดีกะมีหัวใจ (Kon Bau Dee Kaa Mee Hua Jai)
