= Monkaen Kaenkoon =

Thai Mor lam and Luk thung singer

- มนต์แคน แก่นคูน
- Born: Kittikhun Boonkhamchoon (Thai: กิตติคุณ บุญค้ำจุน); 20 July 1973 (age 53); Loeng Nok Tha district, Yasothon Province, Thailand
- Other name: Bao Sieng Sud Sanaen
- Occupation: Singer • Actor
- Notable work: Yam Thor Khor To Ha (2009); Trong Nan Kue Na Thee Trong Nee Kue Hua Jai (2012); Hai Khaw Rak Ther Muen Ther Rak Khaw (2016); Sunya Namta Mae (2019)
- Musical career
- Genres: Luk thung; Mor lam
- Instrument: Vocal
- Years active: 1991–present
- Label: Grammy Gold · GMM Music

Military service
- Allegiance: Thailand
- Branch/service: Royal Thai Army
- Years of service: 1994–2022
- Rank: Sergeant

Monkaen Kaenkoon (Thai: มนต์แคน แก่นคูน, RTGS: Monkan Kankoon; born 20 July 1973) is a famous Thai Mor lam, Luk thung singer from Isan area. Monkaen Kaenkoon is signed to mor lam and luk thung record label Grammy Gold, a subsidiary of GMM Grammy. He performs many popular songs including "Rim Fang Nong Harn", "Roang Ngan Pid Kid Hod Nong", "Chee Wit Puea Chat Rak Nee Puea Ther", "Trong Nan Kue Na Thee Trong Nee Kue Hua Jai", "Ai Jon Ton Dai Bor" and "Kham Wa Hak Kan Mun Hear Tim Sai".

== Life and career ==
Kaenkoon was born as Kittikun Boonkhamchun on July 20, 1973 in the village of Muang Kah Sung, Tambon Sawart, Amphoe Loeng Nok Tha, in Yasothon Province. He is the son of Thongkham and Somthan Boonkhamchun. He learned to sing from his father. He recorded a studio album with Pornsak Songsaeng titled Sia Soon Muea Boon Pawech by stage name Ponrnphet Boonkhamchun, and he was a singer in RS Public Company Limited by stage name Manop Wongphet, after that, he went on military service and served the country for 2 years. After his military service, he met with Sala Khunnawut and he has been a singer for GMM Grammy since then. He recorded his first album as a singer with GMM Grammy titled Yang Koay Thee Soi Dieam, and released in 2005. He has many popular songs with GMM Grammy including "Rim Fang Nong Harn", "Roang Ngan Pid Kid Hod Nong", "Dok Jaan Paharn Jai", "Adeed Rak Mak Sao Kru", "Chee Wit Puea Chat Rak Nee Puea Ther", "Trong Nan Kue Na Thee Trong Nee Kue Hua Jai", "Ai Jon Ton Dai Bor", "Kham Wa Hak Kan Mun Hear Tim Sai", "Sunya Namta Mae" etc.

In September 2019, he provided scholarships and built homes in Pilaiporn Sonklang, to some very poor students.

In early 2021, it was revealed that he was the most viewed YouTube singer in Thailand, with the number of viewers more than world-class girl group Blackpink.

== Discography ==
=== Studio albums ===
#	Album
1st	ยังคอยที่ซอยเดิม (Yang Koay Thee Soai Derm): Released: 26 July 2005; Label: GMM Grammy
2nd	ยามท้อขอโทรหา (Yam Tor Khor Toe Haa): Released: 26 September 2006; Label: GMM Grammy
3rd	สร้างฝันด้วยกันบ่ (Sang Fan Duai Kan Bor): Released: 25 March 2008; Label: GMM Grammy
4th	โรงงานปิดคิดฮอดน้อง (Roang Bgan Pit Kid Hot Nong): Released: 28 May 2009; Label: GMM Grammy
5th	ฝันอีกครึ่งต้องพึ่งเธอ (Fan Eek Krang Tong Pueng Ther): Released: 9 April 2010; Label: GMM Grammy
6th	ตรงนั้นคือหน้าที่ ตรงนี้คือหัวใจ (Trong Nan Kue Na Thee Trong Nee Kue Hua Jai): Released: 14 June 2012; Label: GMM Grammy
7th	ให้เขารักเธอ เหมือนเธอรักเขา (Hai Khao Rak Ther Muean Ther Rak Khaw): Released: 22 September 2016; Label: GMM Grammy
8th	อ้ายฮักเขา ตอนเจ้าบ่ฮัก (Ai Hak Khaw Toan Jao Bor Hak): Released: 1 November 2018; Label: GMM Grammy
9th	ไปรวยเอาดาบหน้า (Pai Ruay Ao Dabk Nha): Released: 11 November 2020; Label: GMM Grammy
10th	มาเด้อฝันเอย (Mah Der Fun Oey): Released: 23 August 2022; Label: GMM Grammy

=== Single ===
- Sun Ya Fung Moon (Cover Version) (Original : Sonti Sommart) (2011)
- Soot Tai Kue Ai Jeb (Cover Version) (Original : Phai Phongsathon) (2015)
- Tee Pueng Kon Glai (Cover Version) (Original : Mike Phiromphon) (2015)
- Hua Jai Kued Hord (Cover Version) (Original : Dang Chittakorn) (2016)
- Bau Hug Bau Tong Song Sarn (Original : Tai Orathai) (2019)
- Sanya Nam Taa Mae (Pa Ti Thin Hua Jai) (2019)
- Kord Kon Nok Jai (Cover Version) (Original : Siriporn Ampaipong) (2020)
- Monkaen Lam Sing (2021)

=== Collaborations ===
- 2009 – Nong Mah Gub Kum Wah Chai (with Kaothip Tidadin) (Original : Maithai Huajaisin)
- 2019 – Mah Non Nah Der (with Dek Lieng Kae)
- 2021 - Poo Sao Rot Hae Yhae Look Sao Jao Phab (with Packky Sakonnaree)
- 2023 – Pern Bau Men Poo Sao How (with Lamplern Wongsakorn)
- 2025 – Jow Nai Chue Kram Kow (with Mike Phiromphon)
- 2026 – Boon Pa Lah Mod Ayoo (with Vieng Naruemol)

== Special albums ==
#	Album
1st	สองสิงห์คะนองลำ (Song Sing Kah Nong Lam): Released: 17 March 2011; Label: GMM Grammy
2nd	เจ็บบอกให้ไป หัวใจบอกให้กอด (Jeb Bork Hai Pai Hua Jai Bork Hai Kord): Released: 27 February 2014; Label: GMM Grammy
3rd	ลูกทุ่งกีต้าร์หวาน (acoustic version) (Look Toong Guitar waan): Released: 15 December 2016; Label: GMM Grammy
4th	ลุยโลดรถแห่ (Lui Lod Rot Hae): Released: 5 March 2021; Label: GMM Grammy
5th	Plern Original ถนนคนเพลิน (Plern Original Tanon Kon Plern): Released: 6 September 2023; Label: GMM Grammy

== Filmography ==
=== TV-Drama ===
Year	Title	Role	TV Network
2015	Mad Ded Sing Thong (หมัดเด็ดเสียงทอง)	Ai Kaen (อ้ายแคน)	Channel 9 MCOT HD

== Other songs ==
- ผูกฝ้ายสายแนน (Pook Fai Sai Nan)
