= Packky Sakonnaree =

Thai luk thung singer

- แพ็กกี้ สกลนรี
- Born: Sasiwimol Chaiprathes; 7 January 1999 (age 26); Sawang Daen Din District, Sakon Nakhon, Thailand
- Other names: Packky (surname); Packky B-Targen (former stage name)
- Education: Sawangdaendin School; Sakonnakhon Rajabhat University
- Occupation: Singer
- Height: 1.60 m (5 ft 3 in)
- Musical career
- Genres: Luk thung; Mor lam
- Years active: 2020–present
- Labels: GMM Grammy (Grammy Gold)

Packky Sakonnaree (Thai: แพ็กกี้ สกลนรี born 7 January 1999) is a Thai luk thung singer from the Isan area of Thailand. She debuted with the single "The Brothers" (Thai: ญาอ้าย). Packky Sakonnaree is signed to record label Grammy Gold, which specializes in luk thung music.

== Early life and music career ==
She was born in Sawang Daen Din District, Sakon Nakhon Province, Thailand. She graduated from Sawangdaendin School and she is studying at Sakonnakhon Rajabhat University.

She started her music career in a school band. She covered many luk thung songs on the YouTube channel named "Teub Nueng Studio" (เติบนึง สตูดิโอ) to bring attention to her singing. Sala Khunnawut, a songwriter under the Grammy Gold label, met her and led her to start on stage in late 2020.

She recorded the song "Phoo Bao Rod Hae Yae Look Sao Chao Phap", in collaboration with singer Monkaen Kaenkoon in April 2021. Her first single was "The Brothers" (Thai: ญาอ้าย) in September 2021. Other songs by her include "Job Huk Chabab Kway Kway" and "Sao Sawang Yang Love."

== Discography ==
Year	Title	References
2021	"Rong Hai Klai Nong Harn" (ร้องไห้ใกล้หนองหาน)	
2021	"Yar Ai" (ญาอ้าย)	
2021	"Job Huk Chabab Kway Kway" (จบฮัก (ฉบับควายๆ))	
2021	"Sao Sawang Young Love" (Feat. Neck Naruphon)	

== Filmography ==
=== TV Series ===
Year	Title	Role	TV Network
2024	Tiean Son Sang (เทียนซ่อนแสง)	Rassamee Teacher (ครูรัศมี)	Channel One 31
