= Ekarat Suvarnabhumi =

Thai singer

Ekarat Suvarnabhumi เอกราช สุวรรณภูมิ
- Born: Thatthanadet Seenont (Thai: ทัตธนาเดช ศรีนนท์); 12 December 1969 (age 56); Roi Et Province
- Genres: Luk thung
- Occupation: Singer
- Instrument: Vocal
- Years active: 1995–2010s
- Label: GMM Grammy (Grammy Gold)

Ekarat Suvarnabhumi (Thai: เอกราช สุวรรณภูมิ; also known as Ek (Thai: เอก), born 12 December 1969) is a Thai Luk thung singer from Isan. He is best known for his studio album Krapao Baen Faen Thing (กระเป๋าแบนแฟนทิ้ง), released in 2000.

== Early life and career ==
Born in Roi Et Province, Thailand as Thatthanadet Seenont, he is the eleventh among twelve siblings. He attended Phon Prachanukul School in Khon Kaen Province for his secondary education. He left for Bangkok to find his sister who lives near Sukhumvit 22. He initially had to sleep in an underpass until he was able to find his sister. By then, he had to find a job to earn money among which was selling bread. After he was able to save ฿300, he purchased radio which he used to listen to and practice singing.

He started to sing in cafés and was discovered by Pimpatiparn Puengthamjit, who convinced him to join and eventually sign up for Grammy Gold in 1995 along with Mike Phiromphon. He recorded his first studio album Plae Nai Jai (แผลในใจ) but rose to popularity in 2000 with his fourth studio album Krapao Baen Faen Thing (กระเป๋าแบนแฟนทิ้ง).

Along with his newfound popularity, he was able to purchase 30 cars and accumulate wealth. By 2010 however, he started to fade out from the music industry and returned to his birthplace where he worked as a farmer.

== Discography ==
=== Studio albums ===
- Plae Nai Jai (1995)
- Namta Dao (1997)
- Rong Hai Song Hon (1999)
- Krapao Baen Faen Thing (2000)
- Sanya Ha Baht (2001)
- Jiea Laoe (2010)

=== Single ===
- "DJ. Oak Hak" (2017)
- "Mai Mee Kau Mae Tung Tae Rerm Ton" (Cover Version) (Original : Phai Phongsathon) (2020)
