= Grammy Gold =

Thai record label

- Parent company: GMM Grammy (1995-2023); GMM Music (2023-present)
- Founded: 1 September 1995; 31 years ago
- Founder: Paiboon Damrongchaitham; Kittisak Chuangarun; Krij Thomas
- Genre: Luk thung; Mor lam
- Country of origin: Thailand

Grammy Gold (Thai: แกรมมี่ โกลด์) is a Thai record label and a subsidiary of GMM Music that focuses on luk thung and mor lam music genre. Its managing director was Krij Thomas until 2016.

== History ==
Grammy Gold was founded in 1995 by Paiboon Damrongchaitham with the desire to create a distinct luk thung label out of Thai pop, which happens to be the main music genre of GMM Grammy. Mike Phiromphon is considered to be the first artist under the said record label.

The record label has produced some notable milestones such as selling 1 million copies in 2002 of Tai Orathai's studio album entitled Grass Flowers in City (Thai: ดอกหญ้าในป่าปูน) and in 2012 with Yinglee Srijumpol's single "Your Heart for My Phone Number" (Thai: ขอใจเธอแลกเบอร์โทร) which topped the Thai music charts and earned 217 million views on YouTube as of April 2014.

== Current artists ==
Currently, Grammy Gold has divided its operations into two sub-labels: the main Grammy Gold label, which produces the full spectrum of *Luk Thung* music, and Thaitone Gen, which focuses on modern-style *Isan* (Northeastern Thai) music.

=== Grammy Gold ===
- Sala Khunnawut
- Mike Phiromphon
- Cham Chamrum
- Siriporn Ampaipong
- Tai Orathai
- Dokaor Toongtong
- Satien Tummue
- Monkaen Kaenkoon
- Phai Phongsathon
- Ratchanok Srilophan
- Surattikarnt Phakcharoen
- Kaothip Tidadin
- Earnkwan Warunya
- San Nakar
- Yinglee Srijumpol
- Lamyong Nonghinhow
- Alraphatsaya Suksai
- Chainarong Yotha
- Vieng Narumon
- Jame Jathurong
- Beer Prompong
- Intira Morales
- New Country (Nu, Tintin, Guitar)
- Am Chonthicha
- Bam Pitchayanin
- Supansa Jiambanjong
- Phakanut Paphannop
- Guitar Nipapron
- Fern Kanyarat
- Saranyu Winaipanit
- Kam Supachet
- Chanaporn Taweechat
- San Sansin
- Paranwat Waramontreerat
- Bonus Pattira
- Title Thanathat
- Empawee Siriraweephat
- Kanwat Thanawatphaisit
- Dew Peerapol
- Pemai Yaowapha
- Kathawut Tuenprayoon
- Phitchapon Dankhuntod
- Bagfah Chadaphon
- Parinporn Ditthabanjong
- Sorn Sinchai
- Plai Kanokporn
- Rammy Phanupong
- J Jazzsper
- Pam Nantawat
- Nueng Utumporn
- Mackey Rithsorn

=== Thaitone Gen ===
- Kantong Tungngern
- Paowalee Pornpimon
- Tao Pusin
- Issarapong Dorkyor
- Lumplearn Wongsakorn
- Nek Naruepol
- Bell Nipada
- Panglam Zivanalee
- Pichak Euangaree
- Ja Singchai
- Kwanchanok Kamnadee
- Eye jingjing
- Rung Nakhonphanom
- Kimkloy
- Oller Areerat
- Matsee New Country
- Mbow New Country
- Gig New Country
- Tatsanasak Thanomsit
- Birthday

== Past artists ==
- Surachai Sombutcharoen
- Pornchai Wanasri
- Ekarat Suvarnabhumi
- Jakrapun Kornburiteerachote
- Jarunee Saengsritim
- Orawee Sujjanon
- Phetrung Laemsing
- Nantida Kaewbuasai
- Saranya Songsermsawad
- Maleewan Jimena
- Saijai Valee
- Panatda Ruangwut
- Phuwan Phothirat
- Thanis Sriklindee
- Li Hui & Li Yang
- Jomkhwan Kallaya
- Uten Prommin
- Nakar
- Sumetch Aongart
- Puwanat Koonpalin
- Ple Chinorot
- Nueng Haruthai
- Kat Rattikarn
- Waranuch Putsachart
- Chai Sanuwat
- Opas Tossaporn
- Thongchai McIntyre
- Pinkpaenter
- Banjob Polin
- Somparn Ampornpong
- Namfon Komonthiti
- Samart Payakaroon
- Sarunyoo Wongkrachang
- Kampan Barntaen
- Pornchita Na Songkla
- Paiboonkiaetti Kiaengkaew
- Direk Amartyakoon
- Pearva Pacharee
- Eakkaphol Montrakarn
- Pee Saderd
- Waiphot Phetsuphan
- Samran Chuayjamnak
- Phloen Phromdaen
- Chai Mueangsing
- Jack Thanaphon
- Kittisak Chaichana
- Peter Fodify
- Paththamawan Niyom
- Samton
- Thanawut Chawatanaworakul
- Rahas Ratchakam
- Thanapol Intharit
- Parapol Parakongseng
- Sunita Leetikool
- Nanthakarn Ritthiwong
- Bang Kaew
- Ammarint Nitipol
- Thitima Sutsoontorn
- Duangjan Suwunnee
- Patinyan Tangtrakul
- Mhai Muang
- Charin Nantanakorn
- Nan Jittangkoon
- Pongphiphat Kongnak
- Sirasak Ittiponpanitch
- Wongsakorn Ratsamitat
- Saovanit Navapan
- Sonthaya Chitmanee
- Chumphon Thongtan
- Chaiya Mitchai
- Watchara Parneieam
- Butsayamart Wichitsoonthon
- Ronnachai Thomyapariwat
- Rhatha Phongam
- Sarawut Marttong
- Lanna Kammin
- Chaina Doll
- Jakkajan Wanvisa
- Worakarn Rotjanawat
- Juthapat Lhaothammatat
- Rock Hon Huay
- Takkatan Chollada
- Maithai Jaitawan
- Phakkawat Phisitwutthirat
- Kumwarn Weerawech
- Winai Punrak
- Chittima Jueajai
- Wongchan Patrot
- Suwatjachai Suttima
- Thipwan Pinpiban
- Konmor
- Pooh Seewilai
- Mod Ubonmanee
- Newkoy Kannikar
- Don Palakul
- Supanat Chalermchaichareonkij
- Gluay Stamp
- David Intee
- Chinnakrit Malison
- Koon Pubadin
- Arm Rachen
- Siriporn Eiammongkon
- Thitinan Watthanoksiwitch
- Pitchya Yodsaeng
- Tuk Watcharakorn
- Somboon Pakfai
- Eid Suphakorn
- Saranyakan Kasemthanapatna
- Som Pueksa
- Kewalin Poonpeekrai
- Pornchanok Liankattawa
- Hay Chutima
- Ning Patthama
- Packky Sakonnaree
- Benz Mueangloei
- Tewten
- Ning Ileen
- Pimmy
- Minitoy
- Poo Bao Supersa (Men Jirapong, Bank Ronnaporn, Pentor Songphon, Arm Warachai)
- 4 Sao Super Zab (Dao Kallayakorn, Earn Chuleeporn, Eyesa Napatalada, Bow Jantip)
- Miss Esarn (Miss Esarn) (Nampueng Sariya, Mai Chanikarn, May Chadaporn, Dao Priabdao, Helen Pichapha)
- Moss Kalasin
- Bam Natthicha
- Mon Worawit
- Spicy
- ERROR 99
- Folk Song
- Kwang Duangruthai
- Peetarbear
- Man Maneewan

== Awards and nominations ==
- The Diamond Creator Awards, from YouTube (2020)
