= Mike Phiromphon =

Thai Mor lam and Luk thung singer

- ไมค์ ภิรมย์พร
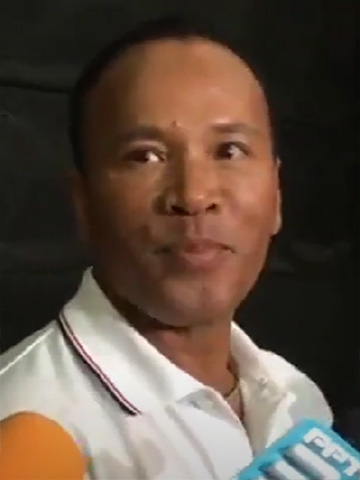
- Mike in 2020
- Born: Phornphirom Phinthapakang; 8 July 1966 (age 60); Kumphawapi district, Udon Thani Province, Thailand
- Other name: Khwan Jai Phu Chai Raeng Ngan
- Occupation: Singer • Actor
- Notable work: Ya Jai Khon Jon (1998); Klab Kham Sa Lar (2017)
- Children: 3 (including Maywadi, Phonphimol and Kanjana)
- Parents: Som Phinthapakang (father); Sonklin Phinthapakang (mother)
- Musical career
- Genres: Luk thung; Mor lam
- Instrument: Vocal
- Years active: 1995–present
- Label: Grammy Gold · GMM Music

Mike Phiromphon (Thai: ไมค์ ภิรมย์พร, also spelled Phiromphorn or Piromporn) (b. July 8, 1966 — ) is a famous Mor lam and Luk thung singer from the Isan region of Thailand. He has many popular songs including "Lakorn Chee Wit", "Phoo Yu Bueang Lang", "Nuei Mai Kon Dee", "Ya Jai Khon Jon", "Klab Kham Sa Lar", "Kae Kaek Rab Chern", "Tee Pueng Khon Klai", "Yang Rak Kan Yoou Rue Plao", "Pha Lar Boon" etc. Phiromphon is considered to be the first luk thung singer whose song has been played on a Thai Airways (THAI) flight.

== Early life and career ==
His birth name is Phornphirom Pinthapakang and he was born on 8 July 1966 in the village of Ta Muang, Tambon Vieng Kam, Amphoe Kumphawapi, in Udon Thani Province. He is the son of Som and Sonklin. He finished education in secondary class. He started on stage in 1995 by releasing his first album Kan Lang Kor Lao, and has worked in entertainment to date.

In 2001, he played his first television role in the series Nai Hoy Tamin in role Seeho, associated with Jintara Poonlarp.

He is married and has two daughters.

== Studio albums ==
| # | Album |
|---|---|
| 1st | คันหลังก็ลาว (Kan Lang Kor Lao): Released: 5 September 1995; Label: GMM Grammy |
| 2nd | น้ำตาหล่นบนโต๊ะจีน (Nam Ta Lon Bon Toe Jeen): Released: 25 July 1996; Label: GMM Grammy |
| 3rd | สัญญารักคนรถ (San Ya Rak Kon Rod): Released: 20 March 1997; Label: GMM Grammy |
| 4th | หัวใจลอยตัว (Hua Jai Loei Tua): Released: 25 September 1997; Label: GMM Grammy |
| 5th | ยาใจคนจน (Ya Jai Khon Jon): Released: 30 July 1998; Label: GMM Grammy |
| 6th | ขายแรงแต่งนาง (Khai Raeng Taeng Nang): Released: 20 May 1999; Label: GMM Grammy |
| 7th | ทางเบี่ยงอย่าเสี่ยงเดิน (Tang Bieang Ya Sieang Dean): Released: 28 October 1999; Label: GMM Grammy |
| 8th | เหนื่อยไหมคนดี (Nuei Mai Khon Dee): Released: 25 May 2000; Label: GMM Grammy |
| 9th | นักสู้ ม.3 (Nak Sue Mor Sam): Released: 26 June 2001; Label: GMM Grammy |
| 10th | ด้วยแรงแห่งรัก (Duai Raeng Haeng Rak): Released: 5 April 2002; Label: GMM Grammy |
| 11th | โรงเรียนล้างจาน (Rong Riean Lang Jan): Released: 25 March 2003; Label: GMM Grammy |
| 12th | ผ้าขาวบนบ่าซ้าย (Pha Khao Bon Ba Sai): Released: 29 June 2004; Label: GMM Grammy |
| 13th | กำลังใจในแววตา (Kam Lang Jai Nai Waew Ta): Released: 24 June 2005; Label: GMM Grammy |
| 14th | มีหัวใจไว้รักเธอ (Me Hua Jai Wai Rak Ther): Released: 28 November 2006; Label: GMM Grammy |
| 15th | ยังรักกันอยู่หรือเปล่า (Yang Rak Kan Yoo Rue Plao): Released: 13 November 2007; Label: GMM Grammy |
| 16th | เพราะโลกนี้มีเธอ (Pro Lok Nee Mee Ther): Released: 24 February 2009; Label: GMM Grammy |
| 17th | บนเส้นทางสายเดิม (Bon Sen Tang Sai Derm): Released: 29 October 2009; Label: GMM Grammy |
| 18th | ไม่สายเกินรอ (Mai Sai Kern Roe): Released: 19 January 2012; Label: GMM Grammy |
| 19th | บนถนนสายความดี (Bon Thanon Sai Khon Dee): Released: 28 December 2018; Label: GMM Grammy |

=== Single ===
| Year | Title | Notes |
|---|---|---|
| 2002 | "Hua Jai Saon" | |
| 2003 | "Master. Puek Paenpik" | Original : Cham Chamram |
| 2005 | "Tong Mee Sak Wan" | Original : Jakrapun Kornburiteerachote |
| 2007 | "Kwan Fun Kong Mae" | In project Pleng Rak Grab Tak Mae |
| 2015 | "Nong MA Gub Kum WA Chai | Original : Maithai Huajaisin |
| 2015 | "Nai Ruy Nah Lift" | Original : Eakkaphon Montrakarn |
| 2016 | "Kau Tot Tee Kid Tueng" | Original : Jakrapun Kornburiteerachote |
| 2016 | "Low Soo Lharn Fung" | Original: Sala Khunnawut |
| 2019 | "Srang" | In project Pa Ti Thin Hua Jai |
| 2020 | "Hau Mok Huak Pai Fark Pa" | Original : Lanpholen Wongsakorn and Tay Trakunto) |
| 2020 | "Teb Muannun" | |

=== Collaborations ===
- 2002 – Kow Dee (with Kat Rattikarn, Ple Chinorot, Nueng Haruetai and Od Opass)
- 2003 – Duay Rak Lae Chuen Chom (with Siriporn Ampaipong and Tai Orathai)
- 2005 – Rak Ther Kon Diew (with Taxi)
- 2008 – Kieang Kang Sang Fun (with Takkatan Chollada)
- 2009 – Nuei Mai Khon Dee (with Siriporn Ampaipong)
- 2011 – Muen Hua Jai Dai Klub Ban (with Fon Tanasoontorn and F.Hero)
- 2016 – Kal Wela Pisoot Kon (with Cocktail (Band))
- 2019 – Wun Tee Dai Kum Tob (with Boy Peacemaker)
- 2023 – Earnkwan Wun Look Jeb (with Rampai Sangtong)
- 2024 – Mow Lhow Mow Ruk (with Mos Kammakbin)
- 2025 – Tanon Nuk Soo (with Taitosmith)
- 2025 – Jow Nai Chue Kram Kow (with Monkaen Kaenkoon)

== Special albums ==
| # | Album |
|---|---|
| 1st | รวมเพลงดัง สองฝั่งโขง ชุดที่ 1,2 (Ruam Pleng Dang 2 fung khong vol.1,2): Released: 23 March 2001; Label: GMM Grammy |
| 2nd | ลูกทุ่งกีต้าร์หวาน ชุดที่ 1,2 (acoustic version) (Look Toong Guitar waan Vol.1,2): Released: 27 September 2002; Label: GMM Grammy |
| 3rd | ด้วยรัก แด่...ครูสลา ชุดที่ 1,2 (Duay Ruk Dae Krusala vol.1,2): Released: 16 December 2005; Label: GMM Grammy |
| 4th | ด้วยรักจากซอกตึก (Duay Ruk Jark Sork Tuek): Released: 4 December 2013; Label: GMM Grammy |
| 5th | ลูกทุ่ง คู่บ้านคู่เมือง ชุดที่ 1,2 (Look Thung Koo Ban Koo Mueng Vol.1,2): Released: 27 August 2015; Label: GMM Grammy |
| 6th | ลูกทุ่ง คู่บ้านคู่เมือง ชุดที่ 3,4 (Look Thung Koo Ban Koo Mueng Vol.3,4): Released: 16 February 2017; Label: GMM Grammy |
| 7th | Plern Original ถนนคนเพลิน (Plern Original Tanon Kon Plern): Released: 6 September 2023; Label: GMM Grammy |

== Filmography ==
=== TV-Drama ===
| Year | Title | Role | TV Network |
|---|---|---|---|
| 2001 | Nay Hoi Tha Min (นายฮ้อยทมิฬ) | Seeho (สีโห) | Channel 7 |
| 2006 | Poo Pitak Ruk Ter (ผู้พิทักษ์รักเธอ) | Mike Phiromphon (ไมค์ ภิรมย์พร) | Channel 5 |
| 2015 | Mad Ded Sing Thong (หมัดเด็ดเสียงทอง) | Grit (กฤษณ์) | Channel 9 MCOT HD |
| 2016 | Chun Thana 3 Cha (ฉันทนาสามช่า) | Mike Phiromphon (ไมค์ ภิรมย์พร) | Channel 7 |
| 2020 | Soot Ruk Zab Elee (สูตรรักแซ่บอีหลี) | Numpol Philompornkul (นำพล ภิรมย์พรกุล) | Channel One 31 |
| 2022 | Ta Yat Pun Kao Nhiaw (ทายาทพันธุ์ข้าวเหนียว) | Kam Nun Mike Invited (กำนันไมค์ (รับเชิญ)) | Channel One 31 |
| 2023 | Dauk Yah Pah Conkrit (ดอกหญ้าป่าคอนกรีต) | Kampun Sonkamlue (Jom Uncle) (คำพันธ์ สมคำลือ (ลุงจอม)) | Channel One 31 |
| 2025 | Pah Dang Nang Ai (ผาแดงนางไอ่) | Payasrichiangcerd (past) / San Mueng (current) (พญาศรีเชียงเชิด (อดีต) แสนเมือง (ปัจจุบัน)) | Channel One 31 |

- 2004 – Jeaw – as Sai Lub
- 2007 – Krob Krua Tua Dam – as Sommhai

== Other songs ==
- เพื่อรักเพื่อเรา (Puea Rak Puea Rao)
- ขอรักข้างเดียว (Kor Rak Kang Diaew)
- ทุ่งกุลาร้องไห้ (Thoong Kula Rong Hai)
- ตัดใจเถิดเพื่อน (Tad Jai Terd Puen)
- อาลัยบัวเขียว (A Lai Bua Kiew)
- จับกระปอม (Jab Kra Pom)
- ดั่งดวงตะเว็น (Dang Duang Tawen)
- คิดฮอด (Kid Hord)
- บ่วงฮัก (Buang Hug)
