= Wachirakrit Pugpobsook =

Thai singer

- วชิระกฤช พุกพบสุข
- Born: January 27, 1982 (age 43); Songkla, Thailand
- Other names: Klui
- Occupation: Singer
- Years active: 2013–2014
- Height: 1.77 m (5 ft 10 in)

Wachirakrit Pugpobsook or Klui (born January 27, 1982) is a Thai singer from GMM Grammy.

Klui was born in Songkla and lived in Chiang Mai. After he graduated at Mattayom 6 Klui studied photography in Japan at Tokyo Visual Arts College.

Klui returned to Thailand to join Sanamlaung Music of GMM Grammy.

== Singles ==
- 2006 "Ther Thao-nan" Album Behind the Song by En Phiyada Lucks Music
- 2007 "Maimeesith", "Rak leklek" Ost. World 2
- 2009 "Why must love you Romantic Version" featuring En Phiyada

=== Remember Band ===
- 2010 "Ja-Mai Tham"

=== Sanamlaung Music ===
- 2013 "Ja Tong Mee Sak Klung Si"
- 2014 "Cross Love" (Japanese Pop Version) featuring Lula (Ost. The Rising Sun)

=== Host ===
- Malang Wan
- Live@G
- Take a Walk
