= YGMM =

Thai record label

YG"MM
- Native name: วายจีเอ็มเอ็ม
- Company type: Joint venture
- Industry: Music
- Founded: 8 April 2021 (5 years ago),
- Key people: Fahmai Damrongchaitham; Phawit Chitrakorn; Kanokporn Sanawatana; Ka Jong-hyun; Lee Joo-young; Kim Ji-yoon
- Parent: GMM Grammy; YG Entertainment
- Website: www.ygmmofficial.com

YG"MM (Thai: วายจีเอ็มเอ็ม) is a Thai record label operated by a joint venture between GMM Grammy in Thailand and YG Entertainment from South Korea.

The company is established with a registered capital of 200 million baht by the executive committees of both companies which GMM Grammy holds a 51% stake, while YG Entertainment holds a 49% stake.

YG"MM is a fully integrated artist development company with the goal of making Thailand one of the most comprehensive development bases for artists. From the audition, training, creation, and promotion to becoming a world-class professional artist, as well as organizing concerts, stage plays, and various performances in the future.

On September 27, 2021, YG"MM opened the audition for idol artists for the first time. In 2022, the company has unveiled their first big project, YG"MM Boy Audition 2022.
