= Man Maneewan =

Thai singer

Man Maneewan แมน มณีวรรณ
- Born: Yingkhun Pajanthon; 5 October 1977 (age 49); Phibun Mangsahan district, Ubon Ratchathani Province, Thailand
- Genres: Luk thung; mor lam
- Occupation: Singer
- Instrument: Vocal
- Years active: 1997–present
- Labels: Krungthai Audio; R-Siam; Grammy Gold; Bangearn Music

Man Maneewan (Thai: แมน มณีวรรณ) (5 October 1977 – ) is a Thai Luk thung singer from Isan area. He has many popular songs including Drunk on the day you got engaged (พี่เมาวันเขาหมั้น) and All ready in case it hurts (พร้อมทุกกรณีที่จะเจ็บ).

He has a birth name Yingkhun Prajanthon. Prajanthon was born on 5 October 1977 in the village of Don Do Kok Lieb, Tambon Non KaLhong, Phibun Mangsahan District, in Ubon Ratchathani Province. He has six siblings. He finished educated from Faculty of Education at Ubon Ratchathani Rajabhat University and Faculty of Business at University of the Thai Chamber of Commerce. He started on stage in 1997 as a singer from Krungthai Audio. He recorded first studio album Drunk on the day you got engaged (พี่เมาวันเขาหมั้น, Phee Mao Wan Khao Mun) and it was very popular. In 2014, he moved to RSiam and recorded a single All ready in case it hurts (พร้อมทุกกรณีที่จะเจ็บ, Prom Took Koranee Tee Ja Jeb).

He has many concert tours in birth country or foreign. He has last concert tour in 2020 in Europe and returned to Thailand because of COVID-19 pandemic.

== Discography ==
=== Studio albums ===
Krungthai Audio

- 1997 – Drunk On The Day You Got Engaged (พี่เมาวันเขาหมั้น, Pi Mao Wan Kao Man)
- 1998 – Does True Love Cares Too (รักแท้แคร์ด้วยหรือ, Ruk Tae Care Duai Rue)

R-Siam

- 2014 – Man Wan Mun (แมน หวาน มันส์)

=== Singles ===
R-Siam

- 2014
  - Het Phon Nam Nao (เหตุผลน้ำเน่า)
  - Ao Yang Hed Jai (เอาหยังเฮ็ดใจ)
  - Jao Klub Ma Ai Dee Jai Tae Klub Pai Ja Dee Kwa (เจัากลับมาอ้ายดีใจ แต่กลับไปจะดีกว่า)
  - All Ready In Case It Hurts (พร้อมทุกกรณีที่จะเจ็บ, Prom Took Koranee Tee Ja Jeb)
- 2017 – Rain Doesn't Fall Throughout The Sky (ฝนตกไม่ทั่วฟ้า)
- 2019 – Muns Yod Na Rod Hae(มันหยดหน้ารถแห่)

Grammy Gold

- 2024 – Fan Kow Mow Hug (แฟนเก่าเมาฮัก)
- 2025 – Kae Kon Hug (แค้ก้อนฮัก)
- 2025 – Buang Huk (บ่วงฮัก) (Original: Monkaen Kaenkoon)
- 2025 – Kah Roo Nah Yah Rob Kuan (กรุณาอย่ารบกวน)
