= Tai Orathai =

Thai singer (born 1980)

- ต่าย อรทัย
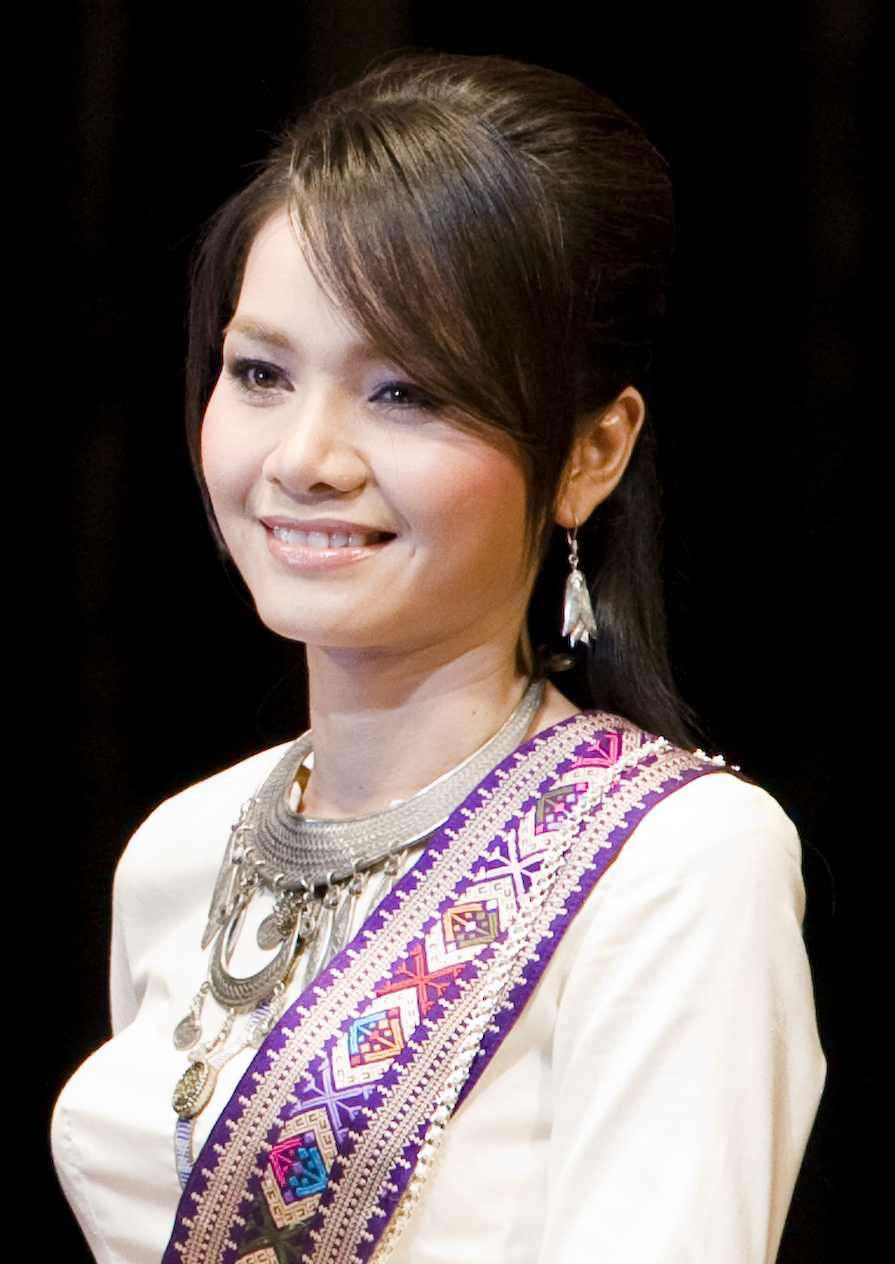
- Orathai in 2009
- Born: Orathai Dabkham (Thai: อรทัย ดาบคำ); 27 March 1980 (age 46); Na Chaluai District, Ubon Ratchathani Province, Thailand
- Other name: Sao Dok Yaah (Miss Grass Flower)
- Occupation: Singer • Actress
- Notable work: Dok Ya Nai Pa Poon (2002); Si Te Nong Hai Bok Nae (2017)
- Musical career
- Genres: Luk thung; Mor lam
- Instrument: Vocal
- Years active: 2000–present
- Label: Grammy Gold · GMM Music

Tai Orathai (Thai: ต่าย อรทัย; born March 27, 1980) is a Thai female Luk Thung singer from Ubon Ratchatani, Thailand. She is also known as "Sao Dok Yaah" (Miss Grass Flower). The name Sao Dok Yaah comes from her debut album. She graduated with a Bachelor's degree in the Faculty of Mass Communication from Ramkhamhaeng University.

== Biography ==
Tai's real name is Orathai Dabkham. She was born on 27 March 1980, in the village of Khum San Chani, Tambon Pohn Swan, Amphoe Na Chaluai, in Ubon Ratchatani Province. She is the daughter of Sang Dabkham and Nittaya Kaewthong. Her parents separated when she was 11 years old. She then lived with her grandmother, Khun Yai Thongkham Kaewthong. She has three younger siblings, whom she helped raise with her grandmother.

== Studio albums ==
#	Album	Track listings
1st	ดอกหญ้าในป่าปูน (Duak Yah Nai Pah Poon) (1 million album): Released: 26 November 2002; Label: GMM Grammy	Track listing: 1. Duak Yah Nai Pah Poon (ดอกหญ้าในป่าปูน); 2. Toh Hah Nae Der (โทรหาแหน่เด๊อ); 3. Bau Hug Bau Taung Song Sorn (บ่ฮักบ่ต้องสงสาร); 4. Kho Sit Kae Rong Hai (ขอสิทธิ์แค่ร้องไห้); 5. Gam Dang Rang Jai (แก้มแดงแรงใจ); 6. Kid Teung Pau Kid Teung Mae Kid Teung Bahn (คิดถึงพ่อ คิดถึงแม่ คิดถึงบ้าน); 7. Earn Sung Lung Song Grarn (เอิ้นสั่งหลังสงกรานต์); 8. Sun Yah Nah Hahn (สัญญาหน้าฮ้าน); 9. Jeeb Laaw Bau Kho (จีบแล้วบ่ขอ); 10. Raw Pee Tee Na Kaun Pa Nom (รอพี่ที่นครพนม)
2nd	ขอใจกันหนาว (Kho Jai Gun Now) (1 million album): Released: 30 March 2004; Label: GMM Grammy	Track listing: 1. Kho Jai Gun Now (ขอใจกันหนาว); 2. Gin Kow Reu Young (กินข้าวหรือยัง); 3. Naun Fung Sieng Fon (นอนฟังเสียงฝน); 4. Tua Hai Keud Haud (ตั๋วให้คึดฮอด); 5. Tung Jai Leum (ตั้งใจลืม); 6. Rote Fai Sai Nam Tah (รถไฟสายน้ำตา); 7. Dow Ten Mor.Ton (ดาวเต้นม.ต้น); 8. Gum Pang Pa Rin Yah (กำแพงปริญญา); 9. Term Hug Term Heang (เติมฮักเติมแฮง); 10. Koon Duak Soot Tai (คูนดอกสุดท้าย)
3rd	คนใกล้เมื่อไกลบ้าน (Kon Glai Mur Glai Bahn ): Released: 26 August 2005; Label: GMM Grammy	Track listing: 1. Kon Glai Mur Glai Bahn (คนใกล้เมื่อไกลบ้าน); 2. Ok Nau (โอ.เค.เน๊าะ); 3. Haum Glin Bahn Gert (หอมกลิ่นบ้านเกิด); 4. Hai Tai Pai Gub Jai (ให้ตายไปกับใจ); 5. Gum Ma Gorn Gam Dang (กรรมกรแก้มแดง); 6. Sow Nah Pa Nay Jorn (สาวนาพเนจร); 7. Purn Gun Rong Ngarn Gow (เพื่อนกันโรงงานเก่า); 8. Eek Kon Tee Keud Hot (อีกคนที่คึดฮอด); 9. Prar Va Sun Yah Hug (แพรวาสัญญาฮัก); 10. Kau Hai Kwarm Dee Koom Kraung (ขอให้ความดีคุ้มครอง)
4th	ส่งใจมาใกล้ชิด (Song Jai Mah Glai Chit ): Released: 27 June 2006; Label: GMM Grammy	Track listing: 1. Song Jai Mah Glai Chit (ส่งใจมาใกล้ชิด); 2. Yah Kid Yung Lai (อย่าคิดหยังหลาย); 3. Bauk Jai Young Ngai Dee (บอกใจยังไงดี); 4. Naang Bap Ngarn Boon (นางแบบงานบุญ); 5. Nah Jau Raw Sai (หน้าจอรอสาย); 6. Keu Hug Reu Bau (คือฮักหรือบ่); 7. Hug Mah Tae Chart Gaun (ฮักมาแต่ชาติก่อน); 8. Purn Jai Sa Mui Rien (เพื่อนใจสมัยเรียน); 9. Fai Kow Tee Pook Kaen (ฝ้ายขาวที่ผูกแขน); 10. Kum Sun Yah Tee Garn Sin Too (คำสัญญาที่กาฬสินธุ์)
5th	มาจากดิน (Mah Jark Din ): Released: 18 December 2007; Label: GMM Grammy	Track listing: 1. Mah Jark Din (มาจากดิน); 2. Sin La Pin Look Jarng (ศิลปินลูกจ้าง); 3. Gep Kwarm Lai Jai Pai Chai Tee Eun (เก็บความหลายใจไปใช้ที่อื่น); 4. Jon Gwah Ja Teung Wun Nun (จนกว่าจะถึงวันนั้น); 5. Ow Jai Chuay Der Ai (เอาใจช่วยเด้ออ้าย); 6. Kon Nun Kaung Jai ...Pen Ai Dai Bau (คนนั้นของใจ...เป็นอ้ายได้บ่); 7. Yahk Fung Kum Wah Kid Hot (อยากฟังคำว่าคิดฮอด); 8. Nung Ngaun Tee Rong Ngarn (นั่งงอนที่โรงงาน); 9. Taung Kum Wah Tum Jai (ท่องคำว่าทำใจ); 10. Nah Ja Lhauy Bahn How (นาจะหลวยบ้านเฮา)
6th	คนในความคิดฮอด (Kon Nai Kwarm Kid Hot): Released: 28 October 2008; Label: GMM Grammy	Track listing: 1. Kon Nai Kwarm Kid Hot (คนในความคิดฮอด); 2. Pen Huang Der Jah (เป็นห่วงเด้อจ้า); 3. Tor Jor Vor Maw Hok (ต.จ.ว.มอหก); 4. Het Pon Tee Ton Jeb (เหตุผลที่ทนเจ็บ); 5. Mai Chai Bahn Row (ไม่ใช่บ้านเรา); 6. Soo Kwun Hua Jai (สู่ขวัญหัวใจ); 7. Hug Ta Laud Kid Hot Sa Mur (ฮักตลอดคิดฮอดเสมอ); 8. Tua Chuay Tee Bau Dai Churn (ตัวช่วยที่บ่ได้เชิญ); 9. Mai Tae Tee Mae Tau (ไหมแท้ที่แม่ทอ); 10. Sah La Wun ...Yah Leum Sun Yah (สาละวัน...อย่าลืมสัญญา)
7th	ฝันยังไกล ใจยังหนาว (Fun Young Glai Jai Young Now ): Released: 26 February 2010; Label: GMM Grammy	Track listing: 1. Fun Young Glai Jai Young Now (ฝันยังไกล ใจยังหนาว); 2. Sa Bai Dee Bau Ai (สบายดีบ่อ้าย); 3. Meu Dai Si Kid Hod (มื้อใด๋สิคิดฮอด); 4. Hai-Jai-Yah-Hai-Jeb (ให้ใจอย่าให้เจ็บ); 5. Roo Wah Kow Mot Jai ...Tum Mai Young Hug Lurah Gurn (รู้ว่าเขาหมดใจ...ทำไมยังฮักเหลือเกิน); 6. Uk Sorn Bon Surah (Pur Krai Bahng Kon ) (อักษรบนเสื้อ (เพื่อใครบางคน)); 7. Kae Taam Gaw Roo Seuk Dee (แค่ถามก็รู้สึกดี); 8. See Pun Daun ...Derd Hawn Hua Jai (สีพันดอน...เดือดฮ้อนหัวใจ); 9. Hua Jai Tee Took Ai Ting (หัวใจที่ถูกอ้ายทิ้ง); 10. Dae ..Took Hua Jai Tee Glai Bahn (แด่...ทุกหัวใจที่อยู่ไกลบ้าน)
8th	ไม่ร้องไห้ ไม่ใช่ไม่เจ็บ (Mai Raung Hai Mai Chai Mai Jeb): Released: 9 December 2010; Label: GMM Grammy	Track listing: 1. Mai Raung Hai Mai Chai Mai Jeb (ไม่ร้องไห้ ไม่ใช่ไม่เจ็บ); 2. Kon Neung Faag Chee Wit Eek Kon Kid Mai Seuah (คนหนึ่งฝากชีวิต อีกคนคิดไม่ซื่อ); 3. Ga Sang Pean Taw (กะซางเพิ่นเถาะ); 4. Yoo sai nor..jow kaung kum wah kid hot (อยู่ไสน้อ...เจ้าของคำว่าคิดฮอด); 5. Yahk Mee Surah Gun Ngow (อยากมีเสื้อกันเหงา); 6. Meuan Nok Tok Rung (เหมือนนกตกรัง); 7. Sow Rong Ngarn Tee Bahn Tum Nah (สาวโรงงานที่บ้านทำนา); 8. Rang Ngarn Kaung Kwarm Ruk (แรงงานของความรัก); 9. Poo Ying Kon Neung ..Kid Teung Ai (ผู้หญิงคนหนึ่งคิดถึงอ้าย); 10. Bud Sa Lop …Yah Job Kae Pob Nah (บั๊ดสะหลบ...อย่าจบแค่พบหน้า)
9th	ปลายก้อยของความฮัก (Plai Gauy Kaung Kwarm Hug): Released: 23 February 2012; Label: GMM Grammy	Track listing: 1. Yan Ai Bau Hug (ย่านอ้ายบ่ฮัก); 2. God Like Hai Nae Der (กด Like ให้แนเด้อ); 3. Sa Lay Tae Ahp Sang Jun (สะเลเตอาบแสงจันทร์); 4. Wae Mah Lauk..Reu Tung Jai Mah Ruk (แวะมาหลอก...หรือตั้งใจมารัก); 5. Kid Hod Ai Sai Pai Bau (คิดฮอดอ้ายสายไปหรือบ่); 6. Jeb Gaw Dai Tah Ai Yahk Job (เจ็บก็ได้ถ้าอ้ายอยากจบ); 7. Pen Fan Gow Young Bau Geng (เป็นแฟนเก่ายังบ่เก่ง); 8. Cheu Wah Mee (Tae Young Ha Bau Jur) (เชื่อว่ามี (แต่ยังหาบ่เจอ)); 9. Hah Taang Job..Gaw Pob Tae Kwarm Kid Teung (หาทางจบ...ก็พบแต่ความคิดถึง); 10. Plai Gauy Kaung Kwarm Hug (ปลายก้อยของความฮัก)
10th	เจ้าชายของชีวิต (Chaochai Khong Chiwit): Released: 16 January 2014; Label: GMM Grammy	Track listing: 1. Kep Kham Wa Rao Wai Nai Kham Wa Rak (เก็บคำว่าเรา ไว้ในคำว่ารัก); 2. Chaochai Khong Chiwit (เจ้าชายของชีวิต); 3. Ai Luem Thuk Kham Nong Cham Thuk Nathi (อ้ายลืมทุกคำ น้องจำทุกนาที); 4. Khwam Ngao Thi Tong Kao Phan (ความเหงาที่ต้องก้าวผ่าน); 5. Sao Rongngan Lan Bia (สาวโรงงานลานเบียร์); 6. Ya Dulae Kan Duai Kan Kohok (อย่าดูแลกันด้วยการโกหก); 7. Thoe Kot Kap Khrai Bon Huachai Khong Chan (เธอกอดกับใคร บนหัวใจของฉัน); 8. Hak Mak Khae Nai Muea Khon Mot Chai Tong Ploi) (ฮักมากแค่ไหน เมื่อคนหมดใจต้องปล่อย); 9. Fa Hong Sang Chai (ฟ้าฮ้องสั่งใจ); 10. Phuk Fai Duai Saita (ผูกฝ้ายด้วยสายตา)
11th	ฝากพรุ่งนี้ไว้กับอ้าย (Fhark Proongnee Wai Kab Ai): Released: 7 April 2017; Label: GMM Grammy	Track listing: 1. Fhak Proongnee Wai Kab Ai) (ฝากพรุ่งนี้ไว้กับอ้าย); 2. Jak Samkun Pen Sam Rong (จากสำคัญ เป็นสำรอง); 3. Namta Yrod Yung Kod Like (น้ำตาหยดยังกด Like); 4. Lam Dern Soo Ma duay Kun (ลำเดิน สู้มาด้วยกัน); 5. Si Te Nong Hai Bok Nae (สิเทน้อง ให้บอกแน); 6. Mee Nong Wai Hed Yrung (มีน้องไว้เฮ็ดหยัง); 7. Sood Tai Ai Kha Tua (สุดท้ายอ้ายกะตั๋ว); 8. Nhao Jai Ni Concert (หนาวใจในคอนเสิร์ต); 9. Jum Bong Tee Chong Jom (จัมบองที่ช่องจอม); 10. Look Sao Tee Lab Soong (ลูกสาวที่ลาบสูง); 11. Bork Rak Tae Bor Roo Seuk Wa Rak (บอกรัก..แต่บ่รู้สึกว่ารัก)
12th	ซังได้ ซังแล้ว (Sang Dai Sang Leaw): Released: 13 December 2018; Label: GMM Grammy	Track listing: 1. Sang Dai Sang Leaw (ซังได้ ซังแล้ว); 2. Ni Lan Dorn (Sing along with Jojo miracel) (นิลันดอน ร้องคู่กับ โจโจ้ มิราเคิล); 3. Poo Bao Ninja (ผู้บ่าวนินจา); 4. Khao Pen Fan Ai La Bor (เขาเป็นแฟนอ้ายล่ะบ้อ); 5. Khab Pai Kor Pen Sam Rong (กลับไปก็เป็นสำรอง); 6. Hak Lhay (ฮักหลาย); 7. Kho Hak Ai Tor Pai Dai Bo (ขอฮักอ้ายต่อไปได้บ่); 8. Mhor Lam Free Land (หมอลำฟรีแลนซ์); 9. Pizza Nha Gluea (พิซซ่าหน้าเกลือ); 10. Kam Sanya Tee Kidhord (คำสัญญาที่คิดฮอด); 11. Dao Jaras Fa (Ost.Dao Jaras Fa) (ดาวจรัสฟ้า เพลงประกอบละคร ดาวจรัสฟ้า); 12. Koy Lom Keiyw Jai (คอนลมเกี่ยวใจ)
13th	ผู้หญิงหัวใจอีสาน (Poo Ying Hua Jai Esarn): Released: 14 November 2025; Label: GMM Grammy	Track listing: 1. Koi Hoo Koi Hoo Suek Koi Jeb (ข่อยฮู้ ข่อยฮู้สึก ข่อยเจ็บ); 2. Poo Ying Hua Jai Esarn (ผู้หญิงหัวใจอีสาน); 3. Poo Sao Sin Mad Mee Feat.Namtoey Thaidol Music (ผู้สาวซิ่นมัดหมี่ Feat. หนามเตย ไทดอลมิวสิค); 4. Pa Ya Yam Si Sow Hug (พยายามสิเซาฮัก)

=== Single ===
- Yark Luem Fan Kow (Cover Version) (Original : Siriporn Ampaipong) (2003)
- Sai Gub Tale (Cover Version) (Original : Nuntida Kaewbuasai) (2005)
- Poo Nee Chum (Cover Version) (Original : Jintara Poonlarp) (2011)
- Sen Tang Sai Kid Hord (2011)
- Kum Wa Job Pood Bao Bao Kau Jeb (Cover Version) (Original : Suratikan Pakcharoen) (2015)
- Mai Chai Fan Tum Tan Mai Dai (Cover Version) (Original : Takkatan Chollada) (2015)
- Dai Seen 5 Kuen Jai Dai Ai Kue Huk (2015)
- Bork Rak Tae Bor Roo Seuk Wa Rak (2016)
- Pee Chai Chua Krow (Cover Version) (Original : Fon Thanasuntorn) (2016)
- Jai Sa Ra Pab (Cover Version) (Original : Jakrapun Kornburiteerachote) (2016)
- Low Soo Lharn Fung (Cover Version) (Original : Sala Khunnawut) (2016)
- Jod Mhai Cha Bub Sud Tai (Originally : Sornchai Mekwichian, but became widely known when Kasem Khomsan covered it) (2017)
- Toong Nang Koi (Original : Pumpuang Duangjan) (2018)
- Kod Hang Chum (2019)
- Dork Yah Glang Muang Yai (2019)
- Kue Tur Chai Mhai (Original Version) (2019)
- Kon Mee Koo Tee Yoo Kon Diew (Pa Ti Thin Hua Jai) (2019)
- Kad Kow Row Yoo (Original : Koong Butsayamat) (2019)
- Rau Sai Jai Sung Mah (Cover Version) (Original : Mike Phiromphon) (2020)

=== Collaborations ===
- 2003 – Duay Rak Lae Chuen Chom (with Siriporn Ampaipong and Mike Phiromphon)
- 2005 – Kon Gai Bur Kow (with Parapon Parakongseng)
- 2009 – Kob Kun Ter Tee Hai Jai (with Jakrapun Kornburiteerachote)
- 2011 – Kwarm Ngao Bok Hai Rao Glai Gun (with Jakrapun Kornburiteerachote)
- 2012 – Huk Nong Kon Diew (with Maithai Jaitawan)
- 2019 – Kue Tur Chai Mhai (with Getsunova)
- 2019 – Wun Tee Bau Mee Jow (with Jirasak Parnpum)
- 2019 – Toh Hah Nae Der (with Phai Phongsathon)
- 2020 – Yah Yom Pae (with Mhai Muang, Surattikarn Pakcharoen and Ratchanok Srilophan)
- 2020 – Kow Jai Mai Trong Gun (with Sukrit Wisetkaew)
- 2021 – Klong Kong Kwan (with Bell Niphada)
- 2023 – Hoi Hug (with Tei Aphiwat)
- 2026 – Kong Pern (with Phai Phongsathon)

== Special albums ==
#	Album	Track listings
1st	อยู่ในใจเสมอ (Yoo Nai Jai Sa Mur) (1 million album): Released: 30 November 2004; Label: GMM Grammy	Track listing: 1. Yoo Nai Jai Sa Mur (อยู่ในใจเสมอ); 2. Wun Tee Bau Mee Ai (วันที่บ่มีอ้าย); 3. Sau.Kau.Sau. Hau Ruk (ส.ค.ส.ห่อรัก); 4. Faag Pleng Teung Row (ฝากเพลงถึงยาย); 5. Rang Jai Nai Ngow Jun (แรงใจในเงาจันทร์); 6. Bau Hug Bau Tong Song Sarn (บ่ฮักบ่ต้องสงสาร) (Special Version); 7. Duak Yah Nai Pah Poon (ดอกหญ้าในป่าปูน); 8. Kho Jai Gun Now (ขอใจกันหนาว); 9. Toh Hah Nae Der (โทรหาแหน่เด๊อ); 10. Gin Kow Reu Young (กินข้าวหรือยัง); 11. Raw Pee Tee Na Kaun Pa Nom (รอพี่ที่นครพนม); 12. Kho Sit Kae Rong Hai (ขอสิทธิ์แค่ร้องไห้)
2nd	ลูกทุ่งกีต้าร์หวาน (acoustic version) (Look Toong Guitar waan): Released: 26 April 2005; Label: GMM Grammy	Track listing: 1. Tua Hai Keud Haud (ตั๋วให้คึดฮอด); 2. Yoo Nai Jai Sa Mur (อยู่ในใจเสมอ); 3. Gin Kow Reu Young (กินข้าวหรือยัง); 4. Toh Hah Nae Der (โทรหาแหน่เด๊อ); 5. Duak Yah Nai Pah Poon (ดอกหญ้าในป่าปูน); 6. Gum Pang Pa Rin Yah (กำแพงปริญญา); 7. Kho Jai Gun Now (ขอใจกันหนาว); 8. Bau Hug Bau Tong Song Sarn (บ่ฮักบ่ต้องสงสาร); 9. Yahk Leum Fan Kow (อยากลืมแฟนเขา); 10. Rote Fai Sai Nam Tah (รถไฟสายน้ำตา); 11. Raw Pee Tee Na Kaun Pa Nom (รอพี่ที่นครพนม); 12. Kid Teung Pau Kid Teung Mae Kid Teung Bahn (คิดถึงพ่อ คิดถึงแม่ คิดถึงบ้าน)
3rd	ภาษารักจากดอกหญ้า (Par Sar Ruk Jark Duak Yah): Released: 20 March 2007; Label: GMM Grammy	Track listing: 1. Kaew Rau Pee (แก้วรอพี่); 2. Ab Ruk Ab K8d Tueng (แอบรักแอบคิดถึง); 3. Ta Lord Ve Lah (ตลอดเวลา); 4. Sow Lum Wong (สาวรำวง); 5. Kid Hord Jung Lei (คิดฮอดจังเลย); 6. Jark Ban Nah Duay Ruk (จากบ้านนาด้วยรัก); 7. Tueng Dung Yung Huang Mae (ถึงดังยังห่วงแม่); 8. Fah Sang Tee Fung Kong (ฟ้าสางที่ฝั่งโขง); 9. Sow Ubon Rau Ruk (สาวอุบลรอรัก); 10. Duay Jai Tee Ruk Gun (ด้วยใจที่รักกัน)
4th	หมอลำดอกหญ้า (Mho Lum Duak Yah ): Released: 28 May 2009; Label: GMM Grammy	Track listing: 1. Ee Esan Lum Pluen (อีสานลำเพลิน); 2. Yah Hai Care Karng Diow (อย่าให้แคร์ข้างเดียว); 3. Sah La Wun ...Yah Leum Sun Yah (สาละวัน...อย่าลืมสัญญา); 4. Hug Mah Tae Chart Gaun (ฮักมาแต่ชาติก่อน); 5. Berng Na Korn Pa Nom (เบิ่งนครพนม); 6. Rang Ngarn Kow Niow (แรงงานข้าวเหนียว); 7. Jow Ying Lum Sing (เจ้าหญิงลำซิ่ง); 8. Jeeb Laaw Bau Kho (จีบแล้วบ่ขอ); 9. Num Tah Lon Bon Tee Naun (น้ำตาหล่นบนที่นอน); 10. Tung Jai Leum (ตั้งใจลืม); 11. Ow Jai Chuay Der Ai (เอาใจช่วยเด้ออ้าย); 12. Eek Kon Tee Keud Hot (อีกคนที่คึดฮอด)
5th	ภาษารักจากดอกหญ้า 2 (Par Sar Ruk Jark Duak Yah 2): Released: 21 February 2013; Label: GMM Grammy	Track listing: 1. Rai Aoi Roy Chum (ไร่อ้อยรอยช้ำ); 2. Ruk Tee Tow Rai (รักที่เท่าไหร่); 3. Kaw Wow Man Bau (ข้อยเว้าแม่นบ่); 4. Tem Jai Hai (เต็มใจให้); 5. Naung Mai Mee Sit (น้องไม่มีสิทธิ์); 6. Kid Haud Ee Sahn (คิดฮอดอีสาน); 7. Dek Pump (เด็กปั๊ม); 8. Taang Dern Ngow Ngoe Kaung Sow Glai Bahn (ทางเดินเหงาๆของสาวไกลบ้าน); 9. Kid Teung Bahn Nah (คิดถึงบ้านนา); 10. Faag Pleng Loy Lom (ฝากเพลงลอยลม); 11. Sow Lam Phloen Raw Ruk (สาวลำเพลินรอรัก); 12. Duak Yah La Mur (ดอกหญ้าละเมอ)
6th	ลูกทุ่งกีต้าร์หวาน (acoustic version) (Look Toong Guitar waan): Released: 25 August 2016; Label: GMM Grammy	Track listing: 1. Bork Rak Tae Bor Roo Seuk Wa Rak (บอกรัก..แต่บ่รู้สึกว่ารัก); 2. Chaochai Khong Chiwit (เจ้าชายของชีวิต); 3. Jeb Gaw Dai Tah Ai Yahk Job (เจ็บก็ได้ถ้าอ้ายอยากจบ); 4. Roo Wah Kow Mot Jai ...Tum Mai Young Hug Lurah Gurn (รู้ว่าเขาหมดใจ...ทำไมยังฮักเหลือเกิน); 5. Mai Raung Hai Mai Chai Mai Jeb (ไม่ร้องไห้ ไม่ใช่ไม่เจ็บ); 6. Het Pon Tee Ton Jeb (เหตุผลที่ทนเจ็บ); 7. Nah Jau Raw Sai (หน้าจอรอสาย); 8. Gep Kwarm Lai Jai Pai Chai Tee Eun (เก็บความหลายใจไปใช้ที่อื่น); 9. Ok Nau (โอ.เค.เน๊าะ); 10. Kon Neung Faag Chee Wit Eek Kon Kid Mai Seuah (คนหนึ่งฝากชีวิต อีกคนคิดไม่ซื่อ); 11. Ai Luem Thuk Kham Nong Cham Thuk Nathi (อ้ายลืมทุกคำ น้องจำทุกนาที); 12. Hai Tai Pai Gub Jai (ให้ตายไปกับใจ); 13. Fun Young Glai Jai Young Now (ฝันยังไกล ใจยังหนาว); 14. Hak Mak Khae Nai Muea Khon Mot Chai Tong Ploi) (ฮักมากแค่ไหน เมื่อคนหมดใจต้องปล่อย); 15. Bauk Jai Young Ngai Dee (บอกใจยังไงดี); 16. Tua Chuay Tee Bau Dai Churn (ตัวช่วยที่บ่ได้เชิญ); 17. Taung Kum Wah Tum Jai (ท่องคำว่าทำใจ); 18. Kau Kae Roo Kao (ขอแค่รู้ข่าว)
7th	Mittapab : มิตรภาพ: Released: 21 October 2020; Label: GMM Grammy	Track listing: 1. Tanon Sai Mittapab (with Phai Phongsathon and Tai Orathai) (ถนนสายมิตรภาพ); 2. Men KOr Tor Mor Bau Nee (with Phai Phongsathon and Tai Orathai) (แม่นกทม.บ่นี่); 3. Jon Klwa (Phai Phongsathon) (จนกว่า); 4. Parn Dai Hia Ma Nor (Tai Orathai) (ปานได้เหี่ยมาเนาะ); 5. Huey (with Phai Phongsathon and Tai Orathai) (หึย); 6. Klub Mah Puea Tim Pai (Tai Orathai) (กลับมาเพื่อถิ่มไป); 7. Chek in Tee Din Dang (Phai Phongsathon) (เช็คอินที่ดินแดง); 8. Tow Tee Fah Pern Hai (Tai Orathai) (เท่าที่ฟ้าเพิ่นให้); 9. Hao Yung Kued Kue Gun Bae (Phai Phongsathon) (เฮายังคึดคือกันบ่); 10. Kah Kai Nae Laew La (Phai Phongsathon) (กะไคแหน่แล้วล่ะ); 11. Muea Barn How Gun Tor (with Phai Phongsathon and Tai Orathai)(เมือบ้านเฮากันเถาะ)
8th	Plern Original Tanon Kon Plern : Plern Original ถนนคนเพลิน: Released: 6 September 2023; Label: GMM Grammy	Track listing: 1. Pern Bau Men Poo Sow Hao (with Monkaen Kaenkoon and Lamplern Wongsakorn) (เพิ่นบ่แม่นผู้สาวเฮา); 2. Hoi Hug (with Tai Orathai and Toey Aphiwat) (ฮ้อยฮัก); 3. Tam Boon Ruam Chat Tak Bart Kon Lah Kun (with Yonglee Srijumpol and Sax Chumpae) (ทำบุญร่วมชาติ ตักบาตรคนละขัน); 4. Hug Jon Bau Hoo Si Hug Jung Dai (with Phai Phongsathon and Fern Gunyarat) (ฮักจนบ่ฮู้สิฮักจังใด๋); 5. Earnkwan Wun Look Jeb (with Mike Philomporn and Rampai Sangthong) (เอิ้นขวัญวันลูกเจ็บ)

== Filmography ==
=== TV Series ===
Year	Title	Role	TV Network
2006	Poo Pi Tak Rak Ter (ผู้พิทักษ์รักเธอ)	Tai Orathai (ต่าย อรทัย)	Channel 5
2015	Mad Ded Sing Thong (หมัดเด็ดเสียงทอง)	Min (มิน)	Channel 9 MCOT HD
2015-2016	Heng Heng Heng (เฮง เฮง เฮง)	Doak Ya (ดอกหญ้า)	Channel One 31
2018	Dao Charat Faa (ดาวจรัสฟ้า)	Fa Wilawun (ฟ้า วิลาวัลย์)	Channel One 31
2020	Mong Kut Doak Ya (มงกุฎดอกหญ้า)	Thidawun Janpen / Thidawun Naboonlay (Pangkwan) ธิดาวัลย์ จันทร์เพ็ญ / ธิดาวัลย์ นาบุญหลาย (แพงขวัญ)	Channel One 31
2022	Ta Yat Pun Kao Nhiaw (ทายาทพันธุ์ข้าวเหนียว)	Sangrawee Sukwong / Sangrawee Kumpangkun (Jey) แสงระวี สุขวงศ์ / แสงระวี คำแพงกุล (เจ้ย)	Channel One 31
2024	Dung Tau Ra Nee (ดั่งธรณี)	Dalhah Maneewan (ดาหลา มณีวัลย์))	Channel One 31
2025	Song Kram Mor Lum (สงครามหมอลำ)	Pimdao Krotnamwong / Pimdao Porn apha (พิมดาว โคตรนามวงษ์ / พิมดาว พรนภา)	Channel One 31

== Other songs ==
- โปงลางอีนางเด้อ (Pong Lang Ee Nang Der)
- โลโซโบว์รัก (Lo So Bow Luk)
- เอียงแก้มคอย (Iong Gam Koy)
- ดาวจรัสฟ้า (Dao Charat Faa)
- มงกุฎดอกหญ้า (Mong Kut Doak Ya)
- ลูกบ่แพ้ (Look Bau Pae)
- ดั่งธรณี (Dung Tau Ra Nee)
- ราชินีดอกหญ้า (Rah Chi Nee Dork Yah)
