= Cat Rattakarn =

Thai female singer

Cat Rattakarn แคท รัตกาล
- Born: Putthachat Yoskewut (Thai: พุทธชาติ ยศแก้วอุด); 30 May 1973 (age 53); Lampang Province, Thailand
- Genres: Luk thung
- Occupations: Singer; actress
- Instrument: Voice
- Years active: 1999–2015
- Labels: Grammy Gold; R-Siam

Cat Rattakarn (Thai: แคท รัตกาล, born 30 May 1973) is a Thai luk thung singer.

== Life and career ==
Born as Putthachat Yoskewut (Thai: พุทธชาติ ยศแก้วอุด) in Lampang Province. She entered showbiz as 1st runner-up at Miss Motor Show 1999.

Her most popular songs include Made in look thoong, Kin Jub Jib, Kid Thueng Kon Klai, Kon Mai Mee Hua Jai, Yeb Jark Thak Fun, Pin Pockpin Pak, Song Kran Nam Ta, Sao Nhue Kor Mee Hua Jai, Chao Wan Mai Jai Tem Rak, Sao Ga Kai, Ther Lam Eieng, Ror Ther, Yom, Ya Kued Nak, Kon Hin Sin Jai, Lam Pang Ngao Mak, Kon D Khong Chun, Khao Mai Rak Kae Eik Leaw.

In 2017–18, she announced her retirement to live a Buddhist spiritual life.

== Discography ==
=== Studio albums ===
- Made in look thoong (with Nueng Haruetai and Ple Chinorod) (2000)
- Yeb Jark Tak Fun (2003)
- Chao Wan Mai Jai Tem Rak (2005)
- Ni Yai Rak (2006)
- Ni Yai Rak 2 (2007)
- Yah Keed Nuk (2009)
- Kon Hin Sin Jai (2012)

=== Single ===
- Gon Hin Sin Jai (2010)
- Por Jai Lulla (2010)
- Wai Alai Sai Lom (2010)
- Rue Doo Fon Bon Bai Nah (2010)
- Kon Dee Kong Chun (2012)
- Kow Mai Rak Kae Eik Laew (2013)

=== Collaborations ===
- 2002 – Kow Dee (with Mike Phiromphon, Nueng Haruethai, Ple Chinorod and Od Opass)
- 2007 – Mai Kiew Gub Lakorn (with Noo Miter)
- 2012 – Kow Kied Tua Laew Ya (with Bew Kallayanee, Wirada Wongtewan and Karaked)
- 2015 – Ma Lai Nam Jai (with Jack Thanaphon)

== Other songs ==
- ค่ำคืนที่งดงาม (Kam Kuen Tee Ngod Ngam)
- คนไม่มีหัวใจ (Kon Mai Mee Hua Jai)
