= GMM Music =

Thai record label and music publisher

GMM Music Public Company Limited
- Logo used since 2023
- Formerly: Music Business of GMM Grammy (1983-2023)
- Type: Public Company Limited
- Industry: Music
- Genre: Various
- Founded: 7 April 2023 (3 years ago)
- Headquarters: GMM Grammy Place, 50 Sukhumvit Road, Khlong Toei Nuea, Watthana, Bangkok, Thailand
- Area served: Worldwide
- Key people: Paiboon Damrongchaitham (President & Chairman); Phawit Chitrakorn (CEO); Fahmai Damrongchaitham (CMO); Thianthan Chalermsaphayakorn (CFO); Janegira Janevakornvong (COO)
- Services: Music production; Artist management; Concert production; Event management; Music publishing; Music distribution; Music Institute
- Revenue: ▲ ฿4,056 million (2024)
- Owner: GMM Grammy (88.29%); Tencent (10%); Warner Music Group (1.5%); YG Entertainment (0.21%)
- Parent: GMM Grammy
- Divisions: Music Production; Music Marketing; Digital Business; Rights Management; Artist Management; Live Show Business
- Subsidiaries: GMM Music Publishing International; BLKGEM; GMM Tempo; G&LDH; GMM Asia; GMM Global
- Website: www.gmmmusic.com

GMM Music Public Company Limited (Thai: จีเอ็มเอ็ม มิวสิค) is a music company in Thailand, operating as a subsidiary of GMM Grammy. Established to oversee GMM Grammy's music business, GMM Music manages various record labels, artist management services, and music distribution channels.

== History ==
=== Before restructuring ===
On February 27, 2023, the board of directors of GMM Grammy approved a major business restructuring of its music division. This involved a spin-off, transferring all music-related assets, personnel, rights, obligations, and contracts to a newly established subsidiary. The objective was to create a sustainable business model and improve operational efficiency. GMM Grammy would hold 100% ownership of the new subsidiary, and the Group Executive Board and/or the Group CEO (Busaba Daoruang), or a designated representative, were authorized to execute, amend, or modify details regarding the restructuring.

On July 3, GMM Grammy announced that it had completed the first phase of the restructuring by registering a new subsidiary, GMM Music Co., Ltd., with the Department of Business Development, Ministry of Commerce, on April 7. The company was established with a registered capital of 4 million THB, with GMM Grammy holding 100% ownership. The leadership of the new entity included Paiboon Damrongchaitham as chairman, Pawit Chittrakon as CEO, and Fahmai Damrongchaitham as Deputy CEO.

On July 27, the GMM Grammy board designated GMM Music as the flagship company for its music operations. Additionally, the board approved a plan for GMM Music to enter the public fundraising process through an initial public offering (IPO), offering up to 30% of its shares and listing on the Stock Exchange of Thailand (SET). The aim was to allow GMM Music to expand its business and promote the New Music Economy. The IPO listing process was subject to seven specific conditions. Since the IPO share allocation was limited to 30%, GMM Music would remain a subsidiary of GMM Grammy even after the public offering.

=== After restructuring ===
On November 15, GMM Grammy announced the completion of the second phase of its music business restructuring as follows:

- August 2: The Group Executive Board of GMM Grammy approved the agreement and terms for the transfer of its entire music business, including contracts and related documents, to GMM Music.
- August 17: An extraordinary general meeting of shareholders of GMM Music approved the business transfer agreement from GMM Grammy. Additionally, the shareholders approved an increase in GMM Music's registered capital from 4 million THB to 800 million THB, which was officially registered on August 31.
- September 1: GMM Grammy transferred its entire music business to GMM Music, including assets, liabilities, obligations, and music-related personnel. Furthermore, GMM Music acquired GMM Grammy's ownership stakes in its music-related subsidiaries, including:
  - GMM Music Publishing International Co., Ltd. (100%)
  - G200M Co., Ltd. (100%)
  - GR Vocal Studio Co., Ltd. (65%)
  - YGMM Co., Ltd. (51%) This transfer was in accordance with the first condition for IPO listing approval.

As a result of this restructuring, GMM Music became a pure-play music company, specializing solely in the music and entertainment business. Meanwhile, GMM Grammy ceased to operate any significant business activities of its own. On November 14, the GMM Grammy Board of Directors approved a transition from an Operating Company to a Holding Company, meaning that GMM Music would become a non-listed major subsidiary focused on the core music business. Additionally, GMM O Shopping Co., Ltd. was designated as a non-listed major subsidiary operating a separate core business. This restructuring would be fully implemented following the completion of GMM Music's IPO.

=== Transformation and expansion of partnerships ===
On February 15, 2024, GMM Music unveiled a new logo as part of its preparation for business separation. The new design emphasizes unique line patterns and highlights the "US" in "music," incorporating connecting lines to align with the company's future vision.

On February 28, GMM Music acquired 250,000 common shares of TNY Entertainment and Technology Co., Ltd. (TNY), which operates the Club After Class music label. The shares were purchased from existing shareholders (Peerapong Yenbamrung and Narongsak Sribandhasakwatcharagon) at 100 THB per share, totaling 25,000,000 THB. This acquisition made TNY an associate company of GMM Music.

On March 11, GMM Music held an extraordinary general meeting and approved its transformation into a public company. The company also conducted a stock split from 10 THB per share to 1 THB per share, increasing its total shares to 800,000,000. GMM Music was officially registered as GMM Music Public Co., Ltd. and notified the Department of Business Development, Ministry of Commerce, of the change.

On April 25, GMM Music partnered with Harlem Shake, a dance academy, to establish BLKGEM, an entertainment arts institute aimed at developing training programs and talent for the expanding entertainment industry. To support this venture, GR Vocal Studio Co., Ltd. was renamed Blackgem Co., Ltd. on March 1.

On May 31, the board of GMM Grammy approved the sale of 80,000,000 GMM Music shares (10%) to strategic investor Black Serenade Investment Limited, a joint venture between Tencent Music and Tencent from China, for $70,000,000 (approximately 2,570,827,000 THB). Tencent paid in cash and sold a 30% stake in Joox Thailand to GMM Tomorrow Limited (a GMM Grammy subsidiary) for $25,000,000 (approximately 918,152,500 THB). The transactions were completed on June 18.

On June 5, GMM Music held a joint venture press conference with LDH, a Japanese music label and the world's second-largest music market. They established G&LDH Co., Ltd. to enhance Thailand's music industry and artist management expertise, increasing company value. The joint venture was officially registered on June 13.

On June 25, GMM Music's extraordinary general meeting approved a capital increase of 80,000,000 THB (equivalent to 1/11 of the existing capital) to fund an Initial Public Offering (IPO). This raised the company's capital from 800,000,000 THB to 880,000,000 THB. The registration was completed with the Department of Business Development, Ministry of Commerce, on the same day.

On August 14, GMM Grammy informed the Stock Exchange of Thailand about multiple GMM Music-related transactions. This included the establishment of GMM Global Co., Ltd. on August 7 to support additional music ventures. The board also approved the sale of 12,000,000 GMM Music shares (1.50%) to Warner Music Hong Kong for $10,500,000 (approximately 367,366,650 THB), with payment in cash. Additionally, GMM Global signed a Commercial Joint Venture Label Agreement with Warner Music Thailand and Warner Music Asia, investing up to 54,564,930 THB per party under a Joint Operation model. They also supported forming an Equity Joint Venture after one year of the contract's enforcement, pending shareholder approval. An extraordinary general meeting on September 26 unanimously approved these transactions, which were finalized on September 27.

On October 8, GMM Grammy and GMM Music formalized a business cooperation agreement to prevent conflicts of interest. GMM Grammy committed not to expand into GMM Music's business sectors, while GMM Music agreed not to operate in GMM Grammy's core businesses managed by its subsidiaries. GMM Music also granted its affiliated companies the right to use its music copyrights at market rates.

=== Listed on the Stock Exchange of Thailand ===
On October 25, GMM Music submitted its IPO filing to the Securities and Exchange Commission (SEC) to list its shares on the Stock Exchange of Thailand under the media and publishing sector with the ticker symbol "GMM." Finansia Securities was appointed as the financial advisor. The IPO consisted of 80,000,000 newly issued shares (9.09%) and 148,800,000 existing shares sold by GMM Grammy (16.91%), totaling 228,800,000 shares (26%). GMM Music is the first and currently the only dedicated music company listed on the Stock Exchange of Thailand.

== Executive Team ==
- Phawit Chitrakorn - Chief Executive Officer
- Fahmai Damrongchaitham - Chief Marketing Officer
- Janegira Janevakornvong - Chief Operating Officer
- Thianthan Chalermsaphayakorn - Chief Financial Officer
- Thanakorn Manoonpol - Chief Investment Officer

== List of GMM Music labels ==
- genie records
- GeneLab
- Grammy Big
- G'NEST
- White Music
- White Fox
- Sanamluang Music
- Family & Bird Box
- Grammy Gold
- Thaidol
- G&LDH (joint venture with LDH)
- GMM GLOBAL (joint operation with Warner Music Asia)

== List of GMM Music artists ==
Current artists of GMM Music include (incomplete list):

POP

- ALALA
- Atom Chanakan
- Bird Thongchai
- Cheris
- Faviq
- FIRZTER
- Getsunova
- I Hate Monday
- JAYLERR
- KIN
- Meepooh
- MEYOU
- Peck Palitchoke
- PERSES
- Samui
- SVRN
- TIGGER
- V3RSE
- VIIS
- Yes In Deed

ROCK

- Bank Preeti
- Big Ass
- Bodyslam
- Clockwork Motionless
- Fool Step
- Hye
- Instinct
- Joey Phuwasit
- Kamin Kingsak
- Klear
- Kwang AB Normal
- Labanoon
- Lek Ratchamet
- Lomosonic
- Num Kala
- Paper Planes
- Palaphol
- Palmy
- PARADOX
- Potato
- Retrospect
- Sweet Mullet
- The Darkest Romance
- The White Hair Cut
- Taitosmith
- Three Man Down
- Tilly Birds
- Tippsy
- Wall Rollers
- Wolftone
- Yes'sir Days

ALTERNATIVE

- Apartment Khunpa
- Lemony
- Vitamin D From The Sun

COUNTRY

- Am Cholticha
- Beer Prompong
- Bell Nipada
- Benz Mueang Loei
- Cham Chamrum
- Dokaor Toongtong
- Earn Surattikant
- Ice Sarunyu
- J Jazzsper
- Kantong Tungngern
- Kaothip Tidadin
- Lamtong Nonghinhow
- Lumplend Wongsakorn
- Meentra Intira
- Mhai Muang
- Mike Phiromphon
- Monkaen Kaenkoon
- Muse Alraphatsaya
- Nek Narurpol
- New Country
- Nhamtoei
- Oiller
- Panglam Zivanalee
- Paowalee Pornpimon
- Phai Phongsathon
- Prae Chanaa
- Ruchanok Seelopun
- San Nakar
- Sateean Tummeu
- Siriporn Ampaipong
- Tai Orathai
- Tanthai
- Tao Pusin
- Tree Chainarong
- Vieng Naruemon
- Yinglee Srijumpol

== GMM Show ==
GMM Music operates live entertainment business through its business unit GMM Show. Which is focusing on organizing large scale concerts and music festivals across Thailand, includes the following lists;

- Big Mountain Music Festival (Khao Yai)
- Chiang Yai Fest (Chiang Mai)
- Chieng Nuea Fest (Khon Kaen)
- Faad Fest (Khao Yai)
- Monster Music Festival (Bangkok)
- Nanglay (Cha-am)
- Nanglen (Khao Yai)
- Poongtai Fest (Songkhla)
- Rock Mountain (Khao Kho)
- Rock On The Beach (Rayong)
- Scream Fest (Bangkok)

== See also ==
- GMM Grammy
