= Takkatan Chollada =

Thai singer (born 1983)

- ตั๊กแตน ชลดา
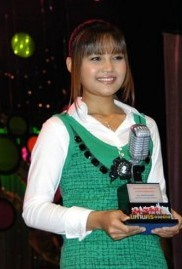
- Born: Chonlada Thongchulklang (Thai: ชลดา ทองจุลกลาง); 17 May 1983 (age 43); Nakhon Ratchasima province, Thailand
- Education: Ramkhamhaeng University
- Occupation: Singer
- Musical career
- Genres: Luk thung; mor lam; gospel; pop; ballad
- Years active: 2003–present
- Labels: GMM Grammy, Independent artist

Takkatan Chollada (Thai: ตั๊กแตน ชลดา) is a female Thai singer and dancer. Her birth name is Chonlada Thongchulklang. She was born on 17 May 1983, in Nakhon Ratchasima province. She is the daughter of Soan and Butr Thongchulklang.

Takkatan graduated with a bachelor's degree from Faculty of Humanities, Ramkhamhaeng University

She entered entertainment by joining the music contests "First Stage Show", and "Ngao Sieang Luk thung .357) hosted by Radio Station Luk thung FM, with tone song look like by Pumpuang Duangjan. Next, in 2006, she was a singer for record label Grammy Gold, which is an affiliate company of GMM Grammy until now. She is popular for the song titled "Mai Chai Fan Tham Taen Mai Dai" (ไม่ใช่แฟนทำแทนไม่ได้).

== Discography ==
=== Solo ===
==== GMM Grammy ====
- Nauw Sang Neon (2006)
- Tha Non Kon Fun (2007)
- Dork Neon Ban Kam (2008)
- Nai Wan Tee Sai Lom Pad Phan (2009)
- Kon Ngao Tee Khao Jai Ther (2009)
- Leug Kam Wa Jeb Keb Wai Kon Dienw (2010)
- Rak Dai Krung La Kon Chuea Jai Dai Kon La Krung (2011)
- Na Tee Dieng Peua Rak Thang Chee Wit Peua Luem (2013)
- Yark Lhab Ta Nai Aom Kord Ther (2015)
- Khong Kwan Reu Khong Lruea (2016)
- Look Toong Guitar waan (acoustic version) (2017)

==== Independent artist ====
- Bok Yai Yai (2019)
- Takkatan Thong Sa Theuxn (2019)
- Kon Rak Nok Som Rod (2020)
- On Son Sat (2020)
- Roon Nee Bor Mee Kam Wa Ngao (2020)
- Tam Roi Mae (2021)
- Pa Ne Jai Pai Duai Gun (2022)
- Sit Song Jarn Pa Ne Jorn (2022)
- Hoon Nang Yak Tah Huk Yoo Der (2026)

=== Single ===
- Jeb Nee Mai Mee Wun Jarng (2007)
- Mae (2007)
- Tong Mee Suk Wun (2015)
- Tue Kue Duang Jai (2015)
- Low Soo Lharn Fung (2016)
- Pae Pen Wun Wah Len Tine (2016)
- Term Hai Gun Took Wun Na Ther (2017)
- Ngai Ngorng (2017)
- Yon Jai Hai Mah Gin (2017)
- Lam Sing Sai Sod (2017)
- Kon Kei Ngo (2018)
- Nong Dai Tai Ai Dai Taeng (2018)
- Kotrd Lew Nai Duang Jai (2018)
- Bau Ngerd Jag Med (2018)
- Sor Lhor Sae Lhae (2019)
- Saad Lai Sod (2019)
- Maeng Kee Nark (2019)

=== Collaborations ===
- 2009 – Yard Nguea Puea Mae (with Satien Tummue)
- 2011 – Kon Barn Aeng (with Jakrapun Kornburiteerachote)
- 2013 – Phum Pae Tee Krung Tep (with Nakarin Kingsak)

== Filmography ==
=== TV Series ===
Year	Title	Role	TV Network
2012	Sai Fa Kub Som Wang (สายฟ้ากับสมหวัง)	Takkatan Chollada (ตั๊กแตน ชลดา)	Channel 5
2014–2015	Mad Ded Sing Thong (หมัดเด็ดเสียงทอง)	Nada (ณดา)	Channel 9 MCOT HD
2023	Pong Lang Huk On Sorn (สายฟ้ากับสมหวัง)	Saeng Dao (แสงดาว)	Channel 3
2024	Wow Worn Ruk (เว้าวอนรัก)	Dork Kaew (ดอกแก้ว)	Channel 3

- 2009 – Esom Som Whung Chachacha – as herself
- 2020 – E Lah Uei – as Jae Kieaw
- 2022 – Mon Ruk Wua Chon – as Little Duck

=== Master of Ceremony: MC ===
Online

- 2018 : On Air YouTube:พบพร ภาคินทร์
- 2022 : On Air YouTube:ตั๊กแตน ชลดา OFFICIAL
