= Pumpuang Duangjan =

Thai luk thung singer (1961–1992)

- พุ่มพวง ดวงจันทร์
- Pumpuang in 1985
- Born: Ramphueng Chithan; 4 August 1961; Hankha, Chainat, Thailand
- Died: 13 June 1992 (aged 30); Buddhachinaraj Phitsanulok Hospital, Phitsanulok, Thailand
- Other name: Pueng
- Occupations: Singer; actress
- Spouse: Kraisorn Leelamekhin (m. 1983)
- Children: 1
- Musical career
- Genres: Luk thung
- Instrument: Vocals
- Years active: 1975–1992
- Labels: Azona; CBS; Topline Diamond

Signature
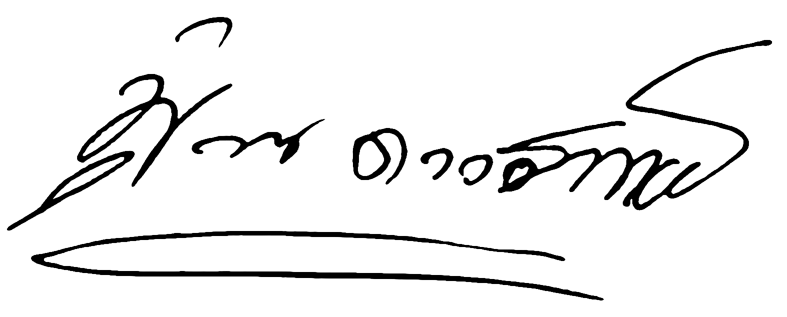

Ramphueng Chithan (Thai: รำพึง จิตร์หาญ; 4 August 1961 – 13 June 1992), known professionally as Pumpuang Duangjan (Thai: พุ่มพวง ดวงจันทร์; RTGS: Phumphuang Duangchan), was a Thai singer and actress. Honored as the "Queen of Luk Thung", she is one of the most celebrated luk thung vocalists in Thailand.

== Life ==
The child of poor farmers, Pumpuang had only two years of primary education before her family's plight forced her to take to the fields as a sugar cane cutter. Although illiterate, she was adept at memorising lyrics and participated in many local singing competitions. At age 15, she came to the notice of a visiting band, Waiphot Phetsuphan, and from the late 1970s onwards, her fame skyrocketed. Her lyrics often spoke about Thailand's rural poor. She adapted pleng luk thung (Thai country music) into a dance-ready form known as electronic luk thung. Although loved by millions of fans, Pumpuang's music career was marred by her lovers, managers, and promoters, who deprived her of her earnings. Due to this, she could not afford treatment for lupus, which eventually caused her death at the age of 30.

== Legacy ==
In 2018, she was featured as a Google Doodle in Thailand on what would have been her 57th birthday

In Thailand, lupus is colloquially referred to as 'Phumpuang's disease,' (Thai: โรคพุ่มพวง; RTGS: Rokh Phumphuang) following the death of Phumpuang from the illness, which brought widespread public attention to the condition.

== Discography ==
=== Albums ===
- 1982 – Jah Hai Ror Hai Por.Sor. Nai (จะให้รอ พ.ศ. ไหน)
- 1982 – Duang Tah Duang Jai (ดวงตา~ดวงใจ)
- 1983 – Seen in District/Nad Pob Nah Amphoe (นัดพบหน้าอำเภอ)
- 1983 – Sao Nah Sang Faen (สาวนาสั่งแฟน)
- 1984 – Ting Nah Leum Toong (ทิ้งนาลืมทุ่ง)
- 1985 – Hue Hue!...Lor Jang (อื้อฮื้อ!...หล่อจัง)
- 1985 – Kon Dang Leum Lang Kway (คนดังลืมหลังควาย)
- 1986 – Harng Noy Thoy Nid (ห่างหน่อย-ถอยนิด)
- 1986 – Chua Tee Dee Jed Hon (ชั่วเจ็ดที-ดีเจ็ดหน)

==== Music Line/Topline Music ====
- 1986 – Grasshopper Tie a Bow/Takkatan Pook Boh (ตั๊กแตนผูกโบ)
- 1986 – Phumpuang's Clever/Tee Ded Pumpuang (ทีเด็ดพุ่มพวง)
- 1987 – Klom (กล่อม)
- 1987 – Dangerous/Antarai (อันตราย)
- 1988 – Pumpuang'31 (พุ่มพวง '31)
- 1988 – Pumpuang'31 Part 2 (พุ่มพวง '31 ภาค 2)
- 1989 – Pumpuang'32 (พุ่มพวง '32)
- 1989 – Pumpuang'32 Part 2 (พุ่มพวง '32 ภาค 2)
- 1990 – Good Luck the Money/Kho Hai Ruay (ขอให้รวย)
- 1991 – Num Phueang Duean Ha (น้ำผึ้งเดือนห้า)
- 1992 – Ruk Thae Phae Ruk Tiem (รักแท้แพ้รักเทียม)

== Filmography ==
=== Movies ===
- 1984 – Nun (ชี)
- 1984 – Ms. Fresh Coconut Milk (นางสาวกะทิสด)
- 1984 – We're Sorry Love (ขอโทษที ที่รัก)
- 1984 – King Cobra Emerged (จงอางผงาด)
- 1985 – Love Hoow She Is (ที่รัก เธออยู่ไหน)
- 1986 – New Gunman (มือปืนคนใหม่)
- 1987 – Charming Singer (เสน่ห์นักร้อง)
- 1987 – Captive Love (เชลยรัก)
- 1987 – Music Love Song Gun (เพลงรัก เพลงปืน)
- 1988 – Diamond Kingdom (เพชรพยัคฆราช)

=== Biographical film ===
- 2011 – The Moon (พุ่มพวง) starring Paowalee Pornpimon directed by Bhandit Thongdee
