= Siriporn Ampaipong =

Thai singer (born 1964)

- ศิริพร อำไพพงษ์
- Born: Sirima Amkhen (Thai: ศิริมา อำเคน); December 7, 1964 (age 61); Phibun Rak district, Udon Thani Province, Thailand
- Occupation: Singer
- Notable work: Bow Rak Si Dam (1992); Parinya Jai (2000); Kid Hod (2010)
- Musical career
- Genres: Luk thung; Mor lam
- Instrument: Vocal
- Years active: 1984–present
- Label: Grammy Gold · GMM Music

Siriporn Ampaipong (Alternative spelling: Siriporn Umpaipong; Thai: ศิริพร อำไพพงษ์; RTGS: Siriphon Amphaiphong, birth name Sirima Amken; Thai: ศิริมา อำเคน; RTGS: Sirima Amkhen ; born Monday December 7, 1964) is a mor lam and luk thung singer from the Isan region of Thailand.

Siriporn Ampaipong was born into a family of mor lam singers in the village of Dohn Kloi, Tambon Dohn Kloi, Amphoe Phibun Rak, in Udon Thani Province. Most of her songs are sentimental ballads. She has released eight hit albums between 2001 and 2004, and is regarded as one of Thailand's most popular folk singers.

== Discography ==
=== Original Albums ===
Title (Thai)	Title (Romanised)	Release date	Note
Krungthai Audio
สตริงลำแพนศิริพร'28	Satring Lum Pan Siriporn'28	1985	
ทุ่งร้างนางลืม-ทุ่งร้างนางคอย	Toong Rang Nang Luem-Toong Rang Nang Koy		with Kaifah Daduang
พบรักที่หัวลำโพง	Pob Ruk Tee Hua Lum Pong	April 1986	
ศิริพรวอนแฟน	Siriporn Won Fan	1987	
อดีตรักหนองหาร	Adeed Ruk Nong Harn	1988	
สาวไร่อ้อยคอยแฟน	Sao Rai Oi Koy Fan		
อาลัยรักที่ชุมพร	Alai Ruk Tee Choomporn	January 1990	
ไม่เอาพระเจ้าก็แจก	Mai Ao Pra Jao Gaw Jaak	July 1990	
C.M.C Studio
บวชชีหนีรัก	Buad She Nee Ruk	August 1990	
เสียแรงหลงรัก	Sia Rang Long Ruk	December 1990	
PGM Record
โบว์รักสีดำ	Bow Ruk See Dum	August 1991	
ลำเพลินเชิญเต้น	Lum Plearn Chern Ten	March 1992	
ไฟใกล้ฟาง	Fai Glai Fang	October 1992	
ล้างจานในงานแต่ง	Lang Jan Nai Ngarn Tang	July 1993	
สาวไร่ปอรอแฟน	Sao Rai Por Raw Fan	November 1993	
หล่อดีพี่จ๋า	Law Dee Phi Jah	July 1994	
ฝากซองกินดองแฟน	Faag Song Gin Dong Fan	October 1994	
สาวอุดรนอนร้องไห้	Sao Udon Non Rong Hai	March 1995	Changed the title and released again.
ลืมไม่ลง	Luem Mai Long	March 1995	Changed the title and released again.
สาวสกลครวญ	Sao Sakol Kruan	March 1995	
แหล่...หัวอกผู้หญิง	Lae...Hua Ok Phu Ying	October 1995	
รวมฮิต 10 ปี	Ruam Hits 10 Phi (Compilation Album)	October 1995	
พบรักที่หัวลำโพง	Pob Ruk Tee Hua Lum Pong	February 1996	
สาวอีสานยังคอย	Sao Isaan Young Koy	February 1996	
เหมือนฆาตกร	Muean Kaad Tah Gorn	February 1996	
รวมฮิต (ชุด 16-19)	Ruam Hits Vol.16-19 (Compilations Album)	April 1996	
ผ้าเช็ดหน้าลาแก้ม	Pah Ched Nah Lah Gam	June 1996	
แสดงสด (ชุด 21-22)	Sadaeng Sod Vol.21-22 (Lives Album)	October 1996	
อวยพรก่อนวันแต่ง	Uay Porn Gorn Wun Tang	January 1997	
แสดงสด (ชุด 24-25)	Sadaeng Sod Vol.24-25 (Lives Album)	June 1997	
ดวงใจของนก	Duang Jai Kong Nok	July 1997	
หัวอกแม่ฮ้างน้อย	Hua Ok Mae Hang Noy	January 1998	
แสดงสด ศิริพรลำซิ่ง	Sadaeng Sod 'Siriporn Lum Zing' (Live Album)	June 1998	
สาวคิงฮ้อน	Sao King Hon	July 1998	
ซังคนใจดำ	Sang Kon Jai Dum	Oct 1998	
ผูกแขนให้แฟนเขา	Pook Kaen Hai Fan Kao	April 1999	
สาวลำเพลินเอิ้นฮัก	Sao Lum Plearn Earn Hug	February 2000	
แต่งแล้วก็ยังรัก	Tang Laaw Gaw Young Ruk	August 2000	She was expired in 2000 and in the same year, she is singer of Grammy Gold.
ฮักผัวเขา	Hug Pua Kao	2001	
คอยรักคนบ้านไกล	Koy Ruk Kon Baan Glai	May 2001	
รักและคิดถึง	Ruk Lae Kid Tueng	December 2001	
Grammy Gold
ลูกทุ่งบ้านดอน ชุด 1 ปริญญาใจ	Parin Yah Jai	August 24, 2000	
ชุด 2 หมอลำบ้านดอน (สู้เพื่อน้องได้ไหม)	Soo Puea Nong Dai Mai	March 16, 2001	
ลูกทุ่งบ้านดอน ชุด 3 แรงใจรายวัน	Rang Jai Rai Wun	August 28, 2001	
ลูกทุ่งบ้านดอน ชุด 4 เพื่อแม่แพ้บ่ได้	Puea Mae Pae Baw Dai	January 24, 2002	
ลูกทุ่งบ้านดอน ชุด 5 สองคนบนทางใจ	Song Kon Bon Tang Jai	August 27, 2002	
ชุด 6 แพ้ใจคนดี	Pae Jai Kon Dee	February 25, 2003	
ชุด 7 อกหักเพราะฮักอ้าย	Ok Hug Praw Hug Ai	November 25, 2003	
ชุด 8 กรุณาอย่าเผลอใจ	Ga Roo Nah Yah Ploe Jai	September 7, 2004	
ชุด 9 ตัวจริงประจำใจ	Tua Jing Pra Jum Jai	March 29, 2005	
ชุด 10 ผู้แพ้ขอแค่เบอร์	Phu Pae Kaw Kae Boer	October 28, 2005	
ชุด 11 ย่านบ่มีชาติหน้า	Yan Baw Mee Chart Nah	June 26, 2007	
ชุด 12 แจ่วบองในกล่องคอมพ์	Jaaw Bong Nai Glong Com	September 23, 2008	
ชุด 13 ขอทำเพื่ออ้าย	Kaw Tum Puea Ai	August 18, 2009	
ชุด 14 สตรีหมายเลข 1	Satree Mai Lek 1	September 15, 2011	
ชุด 15 หัวหน้าแก๊งสาวเสื้อดำ	Hua Nah Gang Sao Suea Dum	October 17, 2013	
ชุด 16 ปริญญาเจ็บ	Parin Yah Jeb	May 21, 2015	
ชุด 17 คนใช่ เกิดช้า	Kon Chai Gerd Cha	March 30, 2017	
ผู้หญิงหลายมือ	Phu Ying Laai Mue	2018	Single
สาวใหญ่มักม่วน	Sao Yai Mug Muan	2019	Single
คนนี้ผัวเฮา	Khon Nee Pua Hao	2019	Single
กรรมเก่า	Kam Kow	2022	Single
เต้ยซิ่ง	Tei Sing	2023	Single
บิ๊กไบค์ใจคด	Big Bike Jai Kod	2023	Single
ไปเคาท์ดาวน์	Pai Cow Dow	2023	Single
เพื่อแม่แพ้บ่ได้	Puea Mae Pae Baw Dai	2023	Single

=== Special projects ===
Title (Thai)	Title (Romanised)	Release date	Note
PGM Record
ม่วนบ่เซา โบว์รักสีดำ ชุด 1	Muan Baw Sao "Bow Ruk See Dum" Vol.1	1999	
ม่วนบ่เซา หมอลำเต็มร้อย ชุด 2 อุ้มท้องกินดองแฟน	Muan Baw Sao "Morlam Tem Roi : Oum Tong Gin Dong Fan" Vol.2	1999	
ม่วนบ่เซา เมา(ไม่ขับ) ชุด 3	Muan Baw Sao "Mao (Mai Kub)" Vol.3	October 1999	
Grammy Gold
กลอนรักร่วมสมัย ชุดที่ 1-3	Gluan Ruk Ruam Sa Mai Vol.1-3	November 22, 2001	
รักนอกหัวใจ (2 ทศวรรษ สลา คุณวุฒิ)	Ruk Nok Hua Jai (Cover Version)	2003	Original : Pimporn Prapaipong
ด้วยรักและชื่นชม (ร่วมกับ ต่าย อรทัย และ ไมค์ ภิรมย์พร)	Duay Rak Lae Chuen Chom (with Tai Orathai and Mike Phiromphon)	2003	
ลูกทุ่งกีตาร์หวาน ชุดที่ 1	Look Thung Guitar Whan Vol.1	January 14, 2005	
ละครชีวิต (10ปี แกรมมี่ โกลด์)	Lakorn Chiwit (Cover Version)	2005	Original : Mike Philomporn
ลูกทุ่งกีตาร์หวาน ชุดที่ 2	Look Thung Guitar Whan Vol.2	August 18, 2006	
เมือยามบ้าน ทั้งมัน ทั้งม่วน ภาค 1	Muea Yarm Barn Thung Mun Thung Muan Vol.1	March 28, 2006	
เมือยามบ้าน ทั้งมัน ทั้งม่วน ภาค 2	Muea Yarm Barn Thung Mun Thung Muan Vol.2	December 8, 2006	
เมือยามบ้าน ปี 3 ม่วนรวมมิตร ฮิตซอดแจ้ง	Muea Yarm Barn Vol.3 "Muan Ruam Mit Hit Sod Jang"	March 18, 2008	
ศิริพร ซิ่งสะเดิดซูเปอร์แซบ	Siriporn "Zing Sa Derd Super Zab"	August 26, 2008	
เหนื่อยไหมคนดี (ร่วมกับ ไมค์ ภิรมย์พร)	Nuei Mai Khon Dee (with Mike Philomporn)	2009	
คิดฮอด (ร่วมกับ บอดี้แสลม)	Kid Hord (with Bodyslam)	2010	
ขอใจเธอแลกเบอร์โทร (20ปี แกรมมี่ โกลด์)	Kau Jai Ter Lak Bertho (Cover Version)	2015	Original : Yinglee Srijumpol
ฉันกำลังเป็นตัวแทนของใครหรือเปล่า (20ปี แกรมมี่ โกลด์)	Chun Gum Lung Pen Tua Tan Kong Krai Rue Plao (Cover Version)	2015	Original : Pee Saderd
คนบ่มีใจ (เพลงครูยังอยู่ในใจ สลา คุณวุฒิ)	Kon Bau Mee Jai (Cover Version)	2016	Original : Nongnut Jaidiaew
บุญผลา (เวอร์ชั่นแม่ญิง)	Boon Pa Lah (Cover Version)	2018	Original : Mike Phiromphon
เอาความขมขื่นไปทิ้งแม่โขง	Ao Kwam Kom Kuen Pai Ting Mae Kong (Cover Version)	2018	Original : Rungruedee Pangphongsai
ให้ตายไปกับใจ (บทเพลงของดอกหญ้า วัน-เวลา-บ่อาจลบ)	Hai Tai Pai Gub Kai (Cover Version)	2019 Original : Tai Orathai	
ปฏิทินหัวใจ : เพลง เสียงแคนที่หนองคาย	Siang Can Tee Nongkhai (Pa Ti Thin Hua Jai)	2019	Single
สัญญาปลาข่อน (25ปี แกรมมี่ โกลด์)	Sun Yah Pla Khon (Cover Version)	2020	Original : Eakkaphon Montrakarn

== Filmography ==
=== TV Series ===
Year	Title	Role	TV Network
2015	Mad Ded Sieang Thong (หมัดเด็ดเสียงทอง)	Jae Kwan (เจ๊ขวัญ)	GMM 25

- 1993 – Siang Kaen Dauk Koon – as Bin Bunluerit, Thida Teerarat, Kraisorn Ruengsri
- 2024 – Esarn Zombie – as Siriporn
