= Phai Phongsathon =

Thai singer (born 1982)

- ไผ่ พงศธร
- Born: Phongsathon Srijan (Thai: พงศธร ศรีจันทร์); 12 June 1982 (age 44); Kut Chum district, Yasothon Province, Thailand
- Occupations: Singer; Actor; Footballer
- Musical career
- Genres: Luk thung; Mor lam
- Years active: 2005–present
- Label: Grammy Gold · GMM Music
Association football career
- Position: Midfielder
Team information
- Current team: Yasothon
- Number: 27
Senior career*
Years	Team	Apps	(Gls)
2016	Thonburi City		
2018	Samut Songkhram		
2019–	Yasothon	4	(1)
- * Club domestic league appearances and goals

Phai Phongsathon (Thai: ไผ่ พงศธร; born 12 June 1982), born as Phongsathon Srijan (Thai: พงศธร ศรีจันทร์, RTGS: Phongsathon Sichan), is a Luk thung and Mor lam singer from Isan area. He also plays professional football as a midfielder for Yasothon.

== Biography ==
Phai Phongsathon birth name is Phongsathon Srijan (Thai: ประยูร ศรีจันทร์), and he was born on 12 June 1982 in the village of Srang Tae, Tambon Pon Ngam, Amphoe Kut Chum, in Yasothon Province to a poor family. He has four cousins. His father died when he was young. He graduated in Secondary 6, and went to Bangkok. He graduated with a third class degree in business from Rattana Bundit University.

In 2005, he was sign with GMM Grammy label as a singer.

== Studio albums ==
#	Album
1st	ฝนรินในเมืองหลวง (Fon Rin Nai Mueng Luang): Released: 29 September 2005; Label: GMM Grammy
2nd	คำสัญญาของหนุ่มบ้านนอก (Kam San Ya Khong Num Ban Nok): Released: 23 February 2007; Label: GMM Grammy
3rd	อยากบอกว่าอ้ายเหงา (Yak Bok Wa Ai Ngao): Released: 29 January 2008; Label: GMM Grammy
4th	อยากมีเธอเป็นแฟน (Yak Mee Thoe Pen Fan): Released: 20 January 2009; Label: GMM Grammy
5th	มีเธอจึงมีฝัน (Mee Thoe Jueng Mee Fan): Released: 15 December 2009; Label: GMM Grammy
6th	เป็นเพื่อนไม่ได้ หัวใจอยากเป็นแฟน (Pen Phuen Mai Dai Hua Jai Yak Pen Fan): Released: 25 November 2010; Label: GMM Grammy
7th	เสียใจกี่ครั้ง ก็ยังเลือกเธอ (Siea Jai Kree Krang Koea Yang Lueak Thoe): Released: 12 January 2012; Label: GMM Grammy
8th	ตั้งใจแต่ยังไปไม่ถึง (Tang Jai Tae Yang Pai Mai Thueng): Released: 30 May 2013; Label: GMM Grammy
9th	อยากเป็นใครคนหนึ่งที่ฝันถึง (Yaak Pen Kri Khon Nueng Thee Fan Thueng): Released: 13 November 2014; Label: GMM Grammy
10th	รักแท้บ่ได้แปลว่าโง่ (Rak Tae Bo Dai Plae Waa Ngo): Released: 12 January 2017; Label: GMM Grammy
11th	ถิ่มอ้ายไว้ตรงนี้ล่ะ (Thim Ai Wai Trong Nee La): Released: 27 September 2018; Label: GMM Grammy
12th	อยากซื้อบ้านนอกให้แม่ (Yak Sue Ban Nok Hai Mae): Released: 2 September 2023; Label: GMM Grammy

=== Single ===
- Ton Toon Rang Jai (2007)
- Rau Dur Kon Dee (2011)
- Hai Tai Pai Gub Jai (Cover Version) (Original : Tai Orathai) (2015)
- Kong Mhun Pen Kong Kwan (Cover Version) (Original : Sorn Sinchai) (2015)
- Mon Ruk Tor Jor Wor (Cover Version) (Original : Dang Chittakorn) (2016)
- Low Soo Lharn Fung (Cover Version) (Original: Sala Khunnawut) (2016)
- Glub Kam Sah Lah (Cover Version) (Original : Mike Phiromphon) (2017)
- Pae Tang (Cover Version) (Original : Labanoon) (2017)
- Thim Ai Wai Trong Nee Lah (2017)
- Geb Set Kaew (Cover Version) (Original : Sayan Sanya) (2018)
- Sung Dai Sung Laew (Cover Version) (Original : Tai Orathai) (2018)
- Pin Sa Kit Sao (Cover Version) (Original : Sayan Sanya) (2018)
- Hai Nan Kwla Tee Kei (Original Version) (2019)
- Kon Tue Mhorn Yang Bau Mee (Pa Ti Thin Hua Jai) (2019)
- Oh Khon Thai Uei (2020)
- Kum Wa Huk Gun Mun Hia Tim Sai (Cover Version) (Original : Monkaen Kaenkoon) (2020)

=== Collaborations ===
- 2009 – Kon Klai Ber Old (with Preawa Pacharee) (Original : Tai Orathai and Palapon Palakongseng)
- 2019 – Hai Nan Kwa Tee Kei (with KLEAR)
- 2019 – Toh Hah Nae Der (with Tai Orathai)
- 2023 – Hug Jon Bau Hoo Si Hug Jung Dai (with Fern Kanyarat)

== Special albums ==
#	Album
1st	ลูกทุ่งกีต้าร์หวาน (acoustic version) (Look Toong Guitar waan): Released: 30 June 2016; Label: GMM Grammy
2nd	ลูกทุ่งกีต้าร์หวาน ชุดที่ 2 (acoustic version) (Look Toong Guitar waan Vol.2): Released: 30 November 2017; Label: GMM Grammy
3rd	มิตรภาพ (Mitapab): Released: 21 October 2020; Label: GMM Grammy
4th	Plern Original ถนนคนเพลิน (Plern Original Tanon Kon Plern): Released: 6 September 2023; Label: GMM Grammy

== Filmography ==
=== TV Series ===
Year	Title	Role	TV Network
2012	Tom Yam Lam Sing (ต้มยำลำซิ่ง)	Phai Phongsathon / Lim Lom (ไผ่ พงศธร / กอไผ่ ลิ่มลม)	Channel 3
2014–2015	Mad Ded Sing Thong (หมัดเด็ดเสียงทอง)	Padlom (พัดลม)	Channel 9 MCOT HD
2017	Nay Hoi Tha Min (นายฮ้อยทมิฬ)	Seeho (สีโห)	Channel 7
2018	Dao Charat Faa (ดาวจรัสฟ้า)	Natthaphong Krietwongsesa/Nat (ณัฐพงษ์ เกียรติวงศา/ณัฐ)	Channel One 31
2020	Mong Kut Doak Ya (มงกุฎดอกหญ้า)	Dandin Sintawee (แดนดิน สินธ์ทวี)	Channel One 31
2022	Ta Yat Pun Kao Nhiw (ทายาทพันธุ์ข้าวเหนียว)	Police Sub Lieutenant Ken Khoksamran (Lieutenant Ken) (ร้อยตำรวจตรี เคน โคกสำราญ (หมวดเคน))	Channel One 31
2024	Dung Tau Ra Nee (ดั่งธรณี)	Tiwakorn Boonkumkoon (Tew) (ทิวากร บุญค้ำคูณ (ทิว))	Channel One 31
2025	Pau Ja Mae Yoo Nai (พ่อจ๋าแม่อยู่ไหน)	Pin (พิณ)	Channel One 31

- 2009 – Esom Som Whung Chachacha – as herself
- 2013 – Luam Phon Khon Luk Thung Nguen Lan – as herself

== Other songs ==
- เราชาวโรงงาน (Rao Chao Rong Ngarn)
- อาลัยบัวเขียว (A Lai Bua Kiew)
- ต้นทางคือฮัก ปลายทางคือเฮา (Ton Tang Kue Hug Plai Tang Kue Hao)
- ลำซิ่งลืมช้ำ (Lam Sing Luem Cham)
- ใจเคยถืกตั๋ว (Jai Kei Tuek Tua)
