= Sala Khunnawut =

Sala Khunnawut สลา คุณวุฒิ
- Born: 2 April 1962 (age 64); Ubon Ratchathani Province, Thailand
- Genres: Luk Thung • Mor lam
- Occupation: Singer-songwriter • Producer
- Years active: 1982–present
- Label: GMM Grammy (Grammy Gold)

Sala Khunnawut (Thai: สลา คุณวุฒิ, also spelled Kunnawut; born 5 April 1962) is a 2021 National Artist Performing Arts (International Thai Music - Composing Thai Luk Thung Songs), Thai Luk thung songwriter and singer from the Isan area. Currently, he is a songwriter and producer for the record label Grammy Gold, a network label of GMM Grammy.

== Early life ==
He is the son of Bunlai and Kan Kunnawut and was born in Amnat Charoen Province. He graduated from Ubon Ratchathani Rajabhat University and started to teach at Ban Rai Khee School, Amnat Charoen Province.

== Music career ==
In 1982, he left teaching to compose and produce the songs of Rungphet Laemsing. Currently, he is an artist, singer, songwriter and producer for the record label Grammy Gold. He is behind the success of many famous Luk thung Isan singers including Mike Phiromphon, Phai Phongsathon, Siriporn Ampaipong, Tai Orathai, Monsit Khamsoi and Monkaen Kaenkoon.

In 2016, he composed and sang the popular song Law Soo Larn Fang (Thai: เล่าสู่หลานฟัง) to mourn the death of King Bhumibol Adulyadej who died on 13 October 2016.

== Personal life ==
He is married to Laddawan Khunnawut and they have two daughters.

== Discography ==
=== Songs ===
- 2001 - Uay Porn Nong Phen
- 2016 - Lao Soo Lan Fang

== Songwriting ==
- Jod Mai Phod Song (artist, Monsit Khamsoi)
- Dok Ya Nai Pa Poon (artist, Tai Orathai)
- Khor Jai Kan Nao (artist, Tai Orathai)
- Jao Chay Khong Chiwit (artist, Tai Orathai)
- Yark Mee The Pen Faen (artist, Phai Phongsathon)
- Yang Koay Thee Soay Dueam (artist, Monkaen Kaenkoon)
