= One 31 =

Thai television network

- Logo used since 2017
- Country: Thailand
- Broadcast area: Southeast Asia
- Headquarters: GMM Grammy Place, Asok Montri Rd., Watthana, Bangkok, Thailand

Programming
- Language: Thai
- Picture format: 1080i HDTV

Ownership
- Owner: GMM Grammy (One 31 Co., Ltd.)
- Sister channels: GMM25

History
- Launched: Satellite system: 1 December 2011; 14 years ago Terrestrial digital: 1 April 2014; 12 years ago Satellite and digital: 2 December 2015; 10 years ago
- Former names: 1-Sky One (1 December 2011-31 March 2012); GMM One (2012-2014)

Links
- Website: www.one31.net

Availability

Terrestrial
- Digital terrestrial television: Channel 31 (HD) (TV5 MUX2)

One 31 (Thai: สถานีโทรทัศน์ช่องวัน 31) and branded as One HD 31, is a Thai digital terrestrial television channel owned by GMM Grammy under The One Enterprise. The network offers a variety of content such as drama, variety programs, competition, news and entertainment programs.

One 31 first aired on 1 December 2011 with the name 1-Sky One (วัน-สกาย วัน) with content and television programs produced by companies under GMM Grammy. On 1 April 2012, it changed its name into GMM Z Hitz (จีเอ็มเอ็มแซต ฮิตส์).

On 1 November 2012, the channel changed its name to GMM One. Its current name, One 31 was adopted on 2 December 2015.

== Presenters ==
=== Current ===
- Teemah Kanjanapairin
- Anuwat Fuengthongdang
- Orachun Rintharawitoon
- Srisupang Tamawut
- Navanan Bamrungphruk
- Chainon Hankhirirat
- Sarunpat Tangphaisarntanakul
- Orarin Yamokgul
- Lily McGrath
- Natsarut Tapornthongsuti
- Sujira Aroonphiphat
- Phattana Chanpantarak
- Thanyaret Engtrakul
- Panita Thammawattana
- Thansita Suwatcharathanakit
- Darunee Suthipitak
- Passakorn Ponbun
- Supaporn Wongthuithong

=== Former ===
- Chawankon Wattanaphisitkul
- Aniporn Chalermburanawong
- Ekkarat Takiennuch (now at SEEU)
- Pornpagee Sirisith (now at Channel 9 MCOT HD)
- Bancha Kaengkan
- Veenarat Laohapakakul
- Nitirath Buachan
- Natphatsorn Simasathien
- Kajornkit Phonphai
- Piyawat Khemphet
- Pornchita Na Songkhla
- Takkatan Chollada
- Pennueng Wongphudorn
