= GMM Grammy =

Thai entertainment conglomerate

GMM Grammy Public Company Limited
- Logo used since 2001

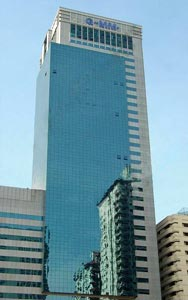
- GMM Grammy Place
- Formerly: Grammy Entertainment (1983–2001)
- Type: PCL
- Traded as: SET: GRAMMY
- ISIN: TH0473010Z09; TH0473010Z17
- Industry: Mass media
- Founded: 11 November 1983 (43 years ago)
- Founder: Rewat Buddhinan; Paiboon Damrongchaitham
- Headquarters: GMM Grammy Place, 50 Sukhumvit Road, Khlong Toei Nuea, Watthana, Bangkok, Thailand
- Area served: Worldwide
- Key people: Paiboon Damrongchaitham (President & Chairman); Boosaba Daorueng (Conglomerate Group CEO & Vice Chairman); Phawit Chitrakorn (Music Business CEO); Fahmai Damrongchaitham (Acting CIO); Kittisak Chuang-a-roon (Goods Business Acting CEO); Churat Rungthawiwut (CFO)
- Products: Music, Films, Television, Radio, Magazines, Digital Business, Event Management, Home shopping
- Revenue: ▼ ฿5,901.95 million (2025)
- Total assets: ▲ ฿8,415.98 million (2025)
- Total equity: ▼ ฿4,354.89 million (2025)
- Number of employees: 1,224 (2025)
- Subsidiaries: GMM Music (music business); GDH 559 (film studio); Nadao Bangkok (Subsidiary of GDH559); GMM Z (set-top box distributor); One 31 (HDTV channel); GMM 25 (SDTV channel); GMMTV (TV producer); GMM Bravo (TV Production); A-Time Media (Radio); CHANGE2561 (TV Production); Across The Universe (joint venture with RS Group)
- Website: www.gmmgrammy.com

GMM Grammy Public Company Limited (Thai: จีเอ็มเอ็ม แกรมมี่ or stylized as G"MM' Grammy) is the largest media conglomerate entertainment company in Thailand. Top Grammy artists include Bird Thongchai, Silly Fools, Loso, Tai Orathai, Bie Sukrit, Tata Young, Mos Patiparn, Bodyslam, Getsunova, Joey Boy. In addition to its music business, the company is involved in concert production, artist management, film production, television production and publishing.

In 2023, GMM Grammy partnered with RS Group, another Thai music label, to establish a joint venture called Across the Universe.

== Major shareholders ==
Rank	Major Shareholders (as of December 6, 2022)	No. of Shares	% of Issued Capital
1	Fah Damrongchaitham Co., Ltd	426,774,344	52.05%
2	Mr. Thaveechat Jurangkool	134,635,723	16.42%
3	Mr. Nuttapol Jurangkool	81,122,700	9.89%
4	Mrs. Hathairatn Jurangkool	51,573,500	6.29%
5	Mr. Komol Juangroongruangkit	22,720,000	2.77%
6	UOB Kay Hian (Hong Kong) Limited – Client Account	17,932,520	2.19%
7	Bangkok Bank Public Co., Ltd	12,278,693	1.50%
8	Thailand Securities Depository Co., ltd	5,216,651	0.64%
9	Mr. Takonkiet Viravan	5,059,236	0.62%
10	Bualuang Equity RMF	4,830,400	0.59%

== Music ==
The company has twelve music subsidiaries:

- Genie Records – Pop/rock records
- Grammy Gold – Thai country records (luk thung)
- Grammy Big – Compilation records
- Sanamluang Music – Indie records
- White Music – Pop records
- GMMTV RECORDS – Ost records
- RISER Music – Pop records
- One Music – Pop/ost records
- Genelab – Pop/rock records
- Thaidol Music – Thai northeast country records (Mor lam)
- White Fox – Pop idol records
- GNEST – Pop idol records
- YG"MM – Pop idol records

GMMTV RECORDS is under GMM TV department and One Music are under GMM One Digital TV department.Manufacturing and distribution comes under MGA Co. Ltd., while the Imagine record store chain is a company-owned retailer. Music publishing is handled by GMM Music Publishing International Co., Ltd., while GMM Grammy licensed karaoke music and equipment is handled by Clean Karaoke.

=== List of GMM Grammy artists ===
Current artists in the GMM Grammy label include (incomplete list):

- Bird Thongchai
- Big Ass
- Bodyslam
- Potato
- Tai Orathai
- Monkaen Kaenkoon
- Yinglee SriJumpol
- Earn Suruttikarn
- Peck Palitchoke
- Tilly Birds
- Three Man Down
- Taitosmith
- Joey Phuwasit
- New & Jiew
- Lula
- Pop Pongkool
- Klear
- Palmy
- Palapol
- Num Kala
- Labanoon
- Boom Saharat
- Bell Nipada
- Meentra Intira
- Paper Planes
- New Country
- PERSES
- ALALA
- KIN
- Matcha
- TIGGER
- Meepooh
- Getsunova
- Phai Pongsathorn
- Clockwork Motionless
- LEMONY
- Mike Piromporn
- Siriporn Ampaipong
- ASIA7
- MEYOU
- Bomb At Track
- Monica
- Only Monday
- Instinct
- Cocktail
- Bell Supon
- Retrospect
- Sweet Mullet
- Paradox
- The Yers
- The White Hair Cut
- Krist Perawat Sangpotirat
- Nanon Korapat Kirdpan
- Win Metawin Opas-iamkajorn
- Gemini Norawit Titicharoenrak
- Fourth Nattawat Jirochtikul
- Phuwin Tangsakyuen
- Perth Tanapon Sukumpantanasan
- Gawin Caskey
- Emi Thasorn Klinnium
- Bonnie Pattraphus Borattasuwan

== Media ==
=== Film ===
GMM Grammy has conducted business in the film industry through various subsidiary studios: Grammy Film (1995–2000), GMM Pictures (2002–2004), GMM Tai Hub (GTH, 2004–2015), and GDH 559 (2016–present). Grammy Film and GMM Pictures were wholly owned subsidiaries, while GTH was formed in 2004 as a joint venture with Tai Entertainment and Hub Ho Hin Bangkok, following their successful 2003 co-production My Girl. GMM Grammy owns a 51% stake in GDH 559, which was formed in 2016 as GTH's successor following disagreements which led to the departure of Tai Entertainment.

=== GMM Z ===
GMM Z Co., Ltd. is a subsidiary of GMM Grammy that produces and distributes satellite television set-top boxes airing free-to-air channels and its own content.

It formerly operated Z PAY TV, a pay television platform offering premium and exclusive content such as German Bundesliga, UEFA Euro 2012, and channels from FOX International Channels before it was sold to CTH.

=== Television ===
GMM Grammy has two terrestrial television channels:

- ONE31 (high definition general channel)
- GMM25 (standard definition youth and alternative channel)

Production marques, studios which produce lakorns, TV series, TV shows, game shows and variety shows, including:

- A-Time Media
- CHANGE 2561 (with Adelfos Co Ltd and Saithip Montrikul Na Audhaya)
- GMM Channel (Owner of GMM25)
- Gross Domestic Happiness (GDH 559)
- GMMTV
- GMM Bravo
- Me Mi Ti
- Nadao Bangkok
- The One Enterprise (Owner of ONE31, merged from Exact, and Scenario)

=== Radio ===
Atime Media, a subsidiary of GMM Grammy, operates the following stations:

- Chill FM (currently broadcast online, formerly on 89.0 MHz then 104.5 MHz in Bangkok)
- EFM 94 (94.0 MHz in Bangkok and online)
- Green Wave 106.5 FM (106.5 MHz in Bangkok and online)
- Hot Wave (formerly Hot 91.5) (currently broadcast online, formerly on 91.5 MHz in Bangkok)
- White Pop (online)
- Cassette (online)

=== Publishing ===
==== Magazines ====
Magazines produced by GMM Grammy include:

- Image – Fashion, beauty, society news.
- Madame Figaro Magazine – Fashion and beauty "targeting sophisticated and highly educated women who do not need 'how to'".
- Her World – The Thai edition of the popular Singaporean women's magazine.
- Maxim – The Thai edition of the popular lad mag.
- Attitude – The Thai edition of the British gay lifestyle magazine.
- In Magazine – Fashion and Entertainment

==== Newspapers ====
GMM Grammy has partial stakes in the Bangkok Post and the Matichon Group, which publishes several Thai-language dailies, including Matichon and Khao Sod.

==== Distribution ====
- Se-Education PLC – A chain of university bookstores.

==== Live Events ====
- Across the Universe (joint venture with RS Group) - organizer of the Grammy RS Concerts series
- Atime Showbiz - subsidiary of Atime Media which is the organizer of the "Cassette Festival" concert series

== See also ==
- Media of Thailand
- List of record labels: 0-9
