= Magnolia Pictures =

American film distributor

Magnolia Pictures LLC
- Type: Subsidiary
- Industry: Motion pictures
- Founded: 2001; 25 years ago
- Founders: Bill Banowsky; Eamonn Bowles
- Headquarters: 49 West 27th Street, New York City, New York, United States
- Parent: 2929 Entertainment
- Subsidiaries: Magnolia Home Entertainment; Magnet Releasing; Magnify
- Website: magnoliapictures.com

Magnolia Pictures LLC is an American independent film distributor and production company. It is a subsidiary of Mark Cuban and Todd Wagner's 2929 Entertainment.

Magnolia was formed in 2001 by Bill Banowsky and Eamonn Bowles, and specializes in both foreign and independent films. Magnolia distributes some of its films, especially foreign and genre titles, under the Magnet Releasing arm. In April 2011, Cuban placed Magnolia up for sale, but stated he would not sell the company unless the offer was "very, very compelling."

Magnify, formerly Magnolia Pictures International, is the global sales arm of Magnolia Pictures.

== Filmography ==
=== 2000s ===
Denotes releases under Magnolia Pictures
Denotes releases under genre label Magnet Releasing

Release date	Title	Notes
February 15, 2002	Wendigo	First release, rights currently owned by Independent Film Company
March 29, 2002	Teddy Bears' Picnic	
May 17, 2002	Late Marriage	
July 5, 2002	Read My Lips	
November 15, 2002	Interview with the Assassin	
March 14, 2003	Under the Skin of the City	
May 30, 2003	Capturing the Friedmans	
September 26, 2003	Bollywood/Hollywood	
January 30, 2004	Cavale	
February 6, 2004	Un couple épatant	
February 13, 2004	Après la vie	
May 21, 2004	Control Room	
May 28, 2004	Bukowski: Born Into This	
August 6, 2004	Bang Rajan	
August 20, 2004	End of the Century: The Story of the Ramones	
October 1, 2004	Woman Thou Art Loosed	
October 29, 2004	Voices of Iraq	
November 26, 2004	Guerrilla: The Taking of Patty Hearst	
February 11, 2005	Ong-Bak: Muay Thai Warrior	
April 22, 2005	Enron: The Smartest Guys in the Room	
May 27, 2005	A League of Ordinary Gentlemen	
September 9, 2005	Keane	
September 30, 2005	The War Within	
October 14, 2005	Nine Lives	
November 9, 2005	Pulse	
December 7, 2005	The World's Fastest Indian	
January 27, 2006	Bubble	
March 10, 2006	S&Man	
March 10, 2006	Evil	
April 14, 2006	Herbie Hancock: Possibilities	
April 18, 2006	Dead Bodies	
April 18, 2006	Klepto	
April 21, 2006	Somersault	Rights currently owned by Film Movement under the Film Movement Classics label
April 28, 2006	The Lost City	
May 5, 2006	One Last Thing...	
May 12, 2006	Dead Man's Shoes	
June 2, 2006	District 13	
June 16, 2006	Only Human	
August 18, 2006	Pusher	
August 18, 2006	Pusher II	
August 18, 2006	Pusher 3	
September 15, 2006	Jesus Camp	
October 27, 2006	Cocaine Cowboys	
November 10, 2006	Samoan Wedding	
December 1, 2006	The Architect	
January 12, 2007	Tears of the Black Tiger	
March 9, 2007	The Host	
March 9, 2007	Maxed Out	
March 23, 2007	Color Me Kubrick	
April 27, 2007	Diggers	
May 18, 2007	Severance	
May 18, 2007	Fay Grim	
June 1, 2007	Crazy Love	
June 22, 2007	Broken English	
July 6, 2007	Dynamite Warrior	
July 17, 2007	Yo-Yo Girl Cop	
July 20, 2007	Cashback	
July 27, 2007	No End in Sight	
August 24, 2007	Closing Escrow	
August 31, 2007	Exiled	
September 14, 2007	Ira and Abby	
September 14, 2007	Great World of Sound	
October 5, 2007	Weirdsville	
October 12, 2007	Terror's Advocate	
October 12, 2007	Murder Party	
October 26, 2007	Mr. Untouchable	
November 16, 2007	Redacted	
December 14, 2007	Outlaw	
February 1, 2008	Shrooms	
February 22, 2008	The Signal	
February 29, 2008	Romulus, My Father	
March 21, 2008	Boarding Gate	
March 25, 2008	Kiltro	
March 28, 2008	Flawless	
April 18, 2008	The Life Before Her Eyes	
May 2, 2008	Graduation	
May 9, 2008	Surfwise	
May 30, 2008	Bigger, Stronger, Faster*	
June 13, 2008	Quid Pro Quo	
June 27, 2008	Finding Amanda	
July 4, 2008	Gonzo: The Life and Work of Dr. Hunter S. Thompson	
July 25, 2008	Man On Wire	
July 29, 2008	Cocaine Cowboys 2	
August 8, 2008	Red	
September 5, 2008	Mister Foe	
September 9, 2008	I Want Candy	Direct-to-video
September 19, 2008	A Thousand Years of Good Prayers	
September 26, 2008	Humboldt County	
September 26, 2008	Hank and Mike	
October 17, 2008	What Just Happened	
October 17, 2008	The Princess of Nebraska	
October 24, 2008	Let the Right One In	First film in the Six Shooter Film Series
October 31, 2008	Splinter	
November 4, 2008	Return to Sleepaway Camp	Direct-to-video
November 21, 2008	Special	
December 5, 2008	A Good Day to Be Black and Sexy	
December 12, 2008	Timecrimes	
January 9, 2009	Yonkers Joe	
January 23, 2009	Donkey Punch	
January 27, 2009	Mercury Man	Direct-to-video
February 3, 2009	Diary of a Tired Black Man	
February 6, 2009	Chocolate	
February 13, 2009	Two Lovers	
February 13, 2009	Eden Log	
March 6, 2009	Shuttle	
March 13, 2009	Severed Ways	
March 13, 2009	The Perfect Sleep	
March 20, 2009	The Great Buck Howard	
March 27, 2009	American Swing	
April 24, 2009	Mutant Chronicles	
May 8, 2009	Julia	
May 8, 2009	Outrage	
May 15, 2009	Big Man Japan	
May 22, 2009	The Girlfriend Experience	
June 12, 2009	Food, Inc.	
June 26, 2009	Surveillance	
July 3, 2009	The Girl from Monaco	
July 10, 2009	Humpday	
July 24, 2009	The Answer Man	
July 31, 2009	Not Quite Hollywood: The Wild, Untold Story of Ozploitation!	
August 4, 2009	Demon Warriors	Direct-to-video
August 21, 2009	World's Greatest Dad	
September 15, 2009	Triangle	Direct-to-video
September 18, 2009	The Burning Plain	
October 5, 2009	Mirageman	Direct-to-video
October 9, 2009	Bronson	
October 23, 2009	Ong Bak 2	
October 23, 2009	The Canyon	
October 30, 2009	The House of the Devil	
November 18, 2009	Red Cliff	
December 4, 2009	Serious Moonlight	
December 8, 2009	Moonlight Serenade	Direct-to-video
December 15, 2009	Chai Lai	Direct-to-video

=== 2010s ===
Denotes standard theatrical release
Denotes release was under genre label Magnet Releasing

Release date	Title	co-production	Notes
January 8, 2010	Wonderful World		
February 5, 2010	District 13: Ultimatum		
March 5, 2010	Harlem Aria		
March 12, 2010	Mother		
March 26, 2010	The Eclipse		
April 2, 2010	The Warlords		
April 30, 2010	The Good Heart		
May 7, 2010	Casino Jack and the United States of Money		
May 11, 2010	Malice in Wonderland		Direct-to-video
May 11, 2010	Legend of the Tsunami Warrior		Direct-to-video
May 21, 2010	180 Degrees South: Conquerors of the Useless		
May 28, 2010	Survival of the Dead		
June 4, 2010	Ondine		
June 18, 2010	I Am Love		
July 9, 2010	REC 2		DVD released by Sony Pictures
July 20, 2010	Barking Dogs Never Bite		Direct-to video
July 23, 2010	Countdown to Zero		
July 27, 2010	The Job		Direct-to-video
July 30, 2010	The Extra Man		
July 30, 2010	Smash His Camera		
August 6, 2010	The Oxford Murders		
August 27, 2010	Centurion		Last film in the Six Shooter Film Series
September 10, 2010	I'm Still Here		
October 1, 2010	Freakonomics		
October 1, 2010	Barry Munday		
October 15, 2010	Down Terrace		
October 29, 2010	Monsters		
November 5, 2010	Client 9: The Rise and Fall of Eliot Spitzer		
December 3, 2010	All Good Things		
December 3, 2010	Night Catches Us		
January 14, 2011	Ong Bak 3		
February 18, 2011	Vanishing on 7th Street		
March 4, 2011	I Saw the Devil		
March 11, 2011	Black Death		
April 1, 2011	Rubber		
April 8, 2011	Ceremony		
April 15, 2011	Square Grouper: The Godfathers of Ganja		
April 26, 2011	Muay Thai Giant		Direct-to-video
April 26, 2011	Chawz		Direct-to-video
April 29, 2011	13 Assassins		
May 6, 2011	Hobo with a Shotgun		
June 3, 2011	Rejoice and Shout		
June 10, 2011	Trollhunter		
June 17, 2011	Page One: Inside the New York Times		
July 1, 2011	The Perfect Host		
July 29, 2011	Good Neighbours		
July 29, 2011	Point Blank		
August 5, 2011	Magic Trip		
August 19, 2011	The Last Circus		
August 30, 2011	BKO: Bangkok Knockout		Direct-to-video
September 9, 2011	Main Street		
September 16, 2011	Happy, Happy		
September 23, 2011	Limelight		
September 30, 2011	Tucker & Dale vs. Evil		
October 7, 2011	Blackthorn		
November 11, 2011	Melancholia		
December 2, 2011	Outrage		
December 9, 2011	I Melt With You		
December 30, 2011	Angels Crest		
January 6, 2012	Roadie		
February 3, 2012	The Innkeepers		
February 24, 2012	Goon		
March 2, 2012	Tim and Eric's Billion Dollar Movie		
March 9, 2012	Jiro Dreams of Sushi		
March 9, 2012	Sound of Noise		
March 16, 2012	Playback		
April 6, 2012	The Hunter		
April 20, 2012	Marley		
April 27, 2012	Headhunters		
May 4, 2012	Meeting Evil		
May 11, 2012	God Bless America		
May 11, 2012	Steve Jobs: The Lost Interview		
May 11, 2012	I Wish		
May 18, 2012	Beyond the Black Rainbow		
June 1, 2012	Apartment 143		
June 8, 2012	Bel Ami		
June 29, 2012	Take This Waltz		
July 6, 2012	The Magic of Belle Isle		
July 20, 2012	The Queen of Versailles		
August 3, 2012	360		
August 10, 2012	2 Days in New York		
August 17, 2012	Compliance		
August 31, 2012	The Good Doctor		
September 7, 2012	REC 3: Genesis		DVD released by Sony Pictures
September 21, 2012	Occupy Unmasked		
October 5, 2012	V/H/S		
October 19, 2012	Nobody Walks		
November 2, 2012	Jack & Diane		
November 9, 2012	A Royal Affair		
November 9, 2012	Nature Calls		
November 30, 2012	Universal Soldier: Day of Reckoning		DVD released by Sony Pictures
December 7, 2012	Deadfall		
January 4, 2013	A Dark Truth		
January 4, 2013	Sushi Girl		
January 18, 2013	Storage 24		
January 25, 2013	John Dies at the End		
February 8, 2013	The Sorcerer and the White Snake		
March 1, 2013	A Place at the Table		
March 8, 2013	The ABCs of Death		
April 5, 2013	The Brass Teapot		
April 5, 2013	No Place on Earth		
April 12, 2013	Into the White		
April 12, 2013	To the Wonder		
May 10, 2013	Venus and Serena		
May 28, 2013	Kiss of the Damned		
May 31, 2013	Shadow Dancer		
June 7, 2013	Évocateur: The Morton Downey Jr. Movie		
June 7, 2013	Syrup		
June 21, 2013	A Hijacking		
July 3, 2013	Big Star: Nothing Can Hurt Me		
July 5, 2013	Hammer of the Gods		
July 12, 2013	The Hunt		
July 12, 2013	V/H/S/2		
July 19, 2013	Blackfish		
August 2, 2013	Europa Report		
August 9, 2013	I Give It a Year		
August 9, 2013	Prince Avalanche		
August 23, 2013	Drinking Buddies		
September 6, 2013	Touchy Feely		
September 6, 2013	Good Ol Freda		
September 27, 2013	Muscle Shoals		
October 4, 2013	Bad Milo!		
November 1, 2013	Mr. Nobody		
November 8, 2013	How I Live Now		
November 8, 2013	Best Man Down		
December 6, 2013	The Last Days on Mars		
December 13, 2013	Here Comes the Devil		
January 3, 2014	Beyond Outrage		
January 17, 2014	Big Bad Wolves		
January 31, 2014	Best Night Ever		
March 7, 2014	Journey to the West: Conquering the Demons		
March 7, 2014	Grand Piano		
March 14, 2014	The Right Kind of Wrong		
March 21, 2014	Nymphomaniac: Vol. I		
April 4, 2014	Alan Partidge		
April 4, 2014	Nymphomaniac: Vol. II		
April 18, 2014	Tasting Menu		
May 2, 2014	The Protector 2		
May 9, 2014	Stage Fright		
May 9, 2014	The Double		
May 30, 2014	Filth		
May 30, 2014	We Are the Best!		
June 6, 2014	The Sacrament		
June 27, 2014	Whitey: United States of America v. James J. Bulger		
July 4, 2014	Life Itself		
July 11, 2014	A Long Way Down		
July 25, 2014	Happy Christmas		DVD released by Paramount
August 15, 2014	Frank		
August 22, 2014	Ragnarok		
September 5, 2014	Frontera		
September 12, 2014	Honeymoon		
September 19, 2014	Life's a Breeze		
September 26, 2014	The Two Faces of January		
October 3, 2014	The Hero of Color City		Theatrical releases in United States
October 24, 2014	Force Majeure		
October 24, 2014	White Bird in a Blizzard		
October 31, 2014	ABCs of Death 2		
November 21, 2014	V/H/S: Viral		
December 5, 2014	Life Partners		
December 5, 2014	Pioneer		
January 2, 2015	REC 4: Apocalypse		DVD released by Sony Pictures
February 6, 2015	Ballet 422		
March 13, 2015	The Wrecking Crew		Inducted into the National Film Registry in 2025
March 27, 2015	Serena		
March 27, 2015	White God		
April 10, 2015	Kill Me Three Times		
April 17, 2015	The Dead Lands		
April 29, 2015	Iris		
May 8, 2015	Skin Trade		
May 22, 2015	Sunshine Superman		
May 29, 2015	Results		
June 3, 2015	A Pigeon Sat on a Branch Reflecting on Existence		
June 12, 2015	The Wolfpack		
June 26, 2015	The Little Death		
July 10, 2015	Tangerine		
July 10, 2015	Nowitzki. The Perfect Shot		
July 31, 2015	Best of Enemies		
September 1, 2015	Tiger House		
September 4, 2015	Steve Jobs: The Man in the Machine		
September 25, 2015	National Lampoon: Drunk Stoned Brilliant Dead		
October 16, 2015	Experimenter		
November 13, 2015	Entertainment		
December 18, 2015	The Lady in the Car with Glasses and a Gun		
December 18, 2015	Noma: My Perfect Storm		
January 22, 2016	Synchronicity		
February 12, 2016	A War		
March 4, 2016	The Wave		
March 8, 2016	Ukraine Is Not a Brothel		
March 11, 2016	Creative Control	Amazon Studios	
March 18, 2016	My Golden Days		
April 15, 2016	The First Monday in May		
April 29, 2016	Viva		
May 13, 2016	High-Rise		
May 13, 2016	Sunset Song		
May 27, 2016	The Ones Below		
May 27, 2016	Presenting Princess Shaw		
June 14, 2016	Gridlocked		Direct-to-video
June 17, 2016	Tickled		
June 17, 2016	The Last King		
July 1, 2016	Satanic		
July 8, 2016	Zero Days		
August 5, 2016	Little Men		
August 19, 2016	Lo and Behold, Reveries of the Connected World		
August 26, 2016	In Order of Disappearance		
September 9, 2016	Author: The JT LeRoy Story	Amazon Studios	
September 23, 2016	The Lovers and the Despot		
September 30, 2016	Danny Says		
October 21, 2016	The Handmaiden	Amazon Studios	
October 28, 2016	Gimme Danger	Amazon Studios	
November 4, 2016	Peter and the Farm		
November 18, 2016	Officer Downe		
December 2, 2016	The Eyes of My Mother		
December 9, 2016	Harry Benson: Shot First		
December 16, 2016	A Kind of Murder		
January 20, 2017	Detour		
February 3, 2017	I Am Not Your Negro		
February 17, 2017	XX		
March 10, 2017	My Scientology Movie		
March 31, 2017	Cézanne and I		
April 7, 2017	Alive and Kicking		
April 7, 2017	SHOT! The Psycho-Spiritual Mantra of Rock		
May 5, 2017	Burden		
May 19, 2017	The Commune		
June 9, 2017	I Love You Both		
June 30, 2017	2:22		
July 21, 2017	Landline		
July 28, 2017	Person to Person		
August 11, 2017	Whose Streets?		
August 18, 2017	Lemon		
September 8, 2017	School Life		
September 29, 2017	Lucky		
October 13, 2017	Human Flow	Amazon Studios	Uncredited
October 27, 2017	The Square		
November 3, 2017	Blade of the Immortal		
December 15, 2017	Permanent		
December 27, 2017	In the Fade		
January 19, 2018	The Final Year		
January 26, 2018	Please Stand By		
March 10, 2018	Leaning into the Wind		
March 23, 2018	Ismael's Ghosts		
March 30, 2018	The China Hustle		
April 13, 2018	Marrowbone		
May 4, 2018	RBG		
May 11, 2018	Boom for Real: The Late Teenage Years of Jean-Michel Basquiat		
May 11, 2018	Higher Power		
May 25, 2018	The Gospel According to André		
June 8, 2018	The Quest of Alain Ducasse		
June 22, 2018	Damsel		
July 6, 2018	Under the Tree		
July 20, 2018	Generation Wealth	Amazon Studios	Uncredited
August 1, 2018	Nico, 1988		
August 10, 2018	Skate Kitchen		
August 17, 2018	Minding the Gap		
August 24, 2018	Support the Girls		
September 7, 2018	Kusama: Infinity		
September 21, 2018	Love, Gilda		
September 28, 2018	Bad Reputation		
October 19, 2018	The Guilty		
November 23, 2018	The Last Race		
November 23, 2018	Shoplifters		
December 7, 2018	Divide and Conquer: The Story of Roger Ailes		
December 7, 2018	Tyrel		
December 14, 2018	The Quake		
March 1, 2019	Woman at War		
March 28, 2019	The Brink		
April 17, 2019	Hail Satan?		
April 26, 2019	Body at Brighton Rock		
May 3, 2019	Ask Dr. Ruth		
May 11, 2019	Dogman		
May 17, 2019	Aniara		
June 21, 2019	Toni Morrison: The Pieces I Am		
July 26, 2019	Mike Wallace Is Here		
August 16, 2019	Cold Case Hammarskjöld		
August 30, 2019	Raise Hell: The Life & Times of Molly Ivins		
October 4, 2019	Wrinkles the Clown		
October 9, 2019	Mister America		
November 15, 2019	Scandalous		
December 6, 2019	Little Joe		
December 13, 2019	Cunningham		

=== 2020s ===
Denotes releases under Magnolia Pictures
Denotes releases under genre label Magnet Releasing

Release date	Title	Notes
February 14, 2020	Buffaloed	
February 21, 2020	Once Were Brothers: Robbie Robertson and The Band	
February 28, 2020	The Whistlers	
March 13, 2020	Slay the Dragon	
July 3, 2020	John Lewis: Good Trouble	
July 24, 2020	Amulet	
July 31, 2020	The Fight	
August 7, 2020	Out Stealing Horses	
September 18, 2020	Alone	
October 2, 2020	12 Hour Shift	
November 20, 2020	Collective	
November 27, 2020	Zappa	
December 4, 2020	Crock of Gold: A Few Rounds with Shane MacGowan	
December 11, 2020	Ip Man: Kung Fu Master	
January 15, 2021	Some Kind of Heaven	
February 5, 2021	A Glitch in the Matrix	
February 5, 2021	Two of Us	
March 5, 2021	Stray	
March 19, 2021	Enforcement	
April 9, 2021	Held	
April 30, 2021	About Endlessness	
May 7, 2021	The Unthinkable	
May 21, 2021	Riders of Justice	
May 28, 2021	Funhouse	
June 11, 2021	Censor	
June 25, 2021	The Evil Next Door	
July 2, 2021	First Date	
July 23, 2021	Mandibles	
August 6, 2021	Swan Song	
August 13, 2021	The East	
August 20, 2021	Cryptozoo	
September 3, 2021	Yakuza Princess	
September 10, 2021	Fauci	
October 1, 2021	Mayday	
November 19, 2021	Bad Luck Banging or Loony Porn	
December 3, 2021	Citizen Ashe	
December 10, 2021	Agnes	
January 14, 2022	Italian Studies	
January 28, 2022	A Taste of Hunger	
February 11, 2022	Indemnity	
February 25, 2022	The Burning Sea	
March 11, 2022	Ultrasound	
March 25, 2022	You Are Not My Mother	
April 29, 2022	Anaïs in Love	
June 17, 2022	Bitterbrush	
July 8, 2022	Dreaming Walls	
July 22, 2022	My Old School	
August 5, 2022	I Love My Dad	
September 2, 2022	A Compassionate Spy	
September 16, 2022	Riotsville, U.S.A.	
October 7, 2022	Piggy	
November 4, 2022	Next Exit	
December 2, 2022	Hunt	
December 23, 2022	Joyride	
January 27, 2023	Kompromat	
February 3, 2023	Baby Ruby	
March 31, 2023	Smoking Causes Coughing	
March 31, 2023	In Viaggio: The Travels of Pope Francis	
April 21, 2023	Little Richard: I Am Everything	
May 19, 2023	Master Gardener	
June 9, 2023	Dalíland	
June 9, 2023	Blue Jean	
July 7, 2023	The League	
July 28, 2023	Kokomo City	
August 4, 2023	A Compassionate Spy	
August 11, 2023	Operation Napoleon	
September 15, 2023	Invisible Beauty	
September 29, 2023	Deliver Us	
October 6, 2023	Joan Baez: I Am a Noise	
November 7, 2023	The Stones & Brian Jones	
December 8, 2023	Lord of Misrule	
December 15, 2023	Immediate Family	
January 26, 2024	The Seeding	
February 2, 2024	The Promised Land	
February 23, 2024	Red Right Hand	Co-distributed with Redbox Entertainment
March 1, 2024	Amelia's Children	
March 15, 2024	The Animal Kingdom	
March 29, 2024	Lousy Carter	
April 12, 2024	Food, Inc. 2	
April 26, 2024	The Feeling That the Time for Doing Something Has Passed	
May 3, 2024	Catching Fire: The Story of Anita Pallenberg	
May 31, 2024	What You Wish For	
June 14, 2024	The Grab	
June 21, 2024	Thelma	
July 9, 2024	Nordic by Nature	
July 12, 2024	The Convert	
July 26, 2024	The Arctic Convoy	
August 9, 2024	Dance First	
September 20, 2024	Omni Loop	
September 27, 2024	Sleep	
October 4, 2024	Things Will Be Different	
November 1, 2024	The Gutter	
November 15, 2024	The World According To Allee Willis	
November 22, 2024	Ernest Cole: Lost and Found	
December 6, 2024	Lake George	
January 17, 2025	Night Call	
February 21, 2025	The Quiet Ones	
March 14, 2025	Borderline	
March 21, 2025	The Assessment	
April 4, 2025	Eric Larue	
April 11, 2025	One to One: John & Yoko	
May 2, 2025	Swamp Dogg Gets His Pool Painted	
May 16, 2025	Sister Midnight	
June 13, 2025	Prime Minister	
July 2, 2025	40 Acres	
July 25, 2025	Folktales	
August 8, 2025	It's Never Over, Jeff Buckley	
September 12, 2025	Rabbit Trap	
September 19, 2025	Plainclothes	
November 14, 2025	The Carpenter's Son	
December 5, 2025	Man Finds Tape	
February 27, 2026	The Napa Boys	
March 6, 2026	Heel	
April 17, 2026	Normal	
June 5, 2026	Carolina Caroline	
June 19, 2026	Maddie's Secret	
July 31, 2026	I Want Your Sex	
August 7, 2026	Late Fame	
September 18, 2026	The History of Concrete	
September 25, 2026	Never After Dark	

=== Upcoming films ===
Upcoming films without release dates
Release date	Title	Notes
2026	Operation Napoleon – Tears of the Wolf	
2026	The Shepherd	
Summer 2027	Jim Queen	
2027	Trash Mountain	
