= Kiatkamol Lata =

Thai actor and singer (born 1983)

- เกียรติกมล ล่าทา
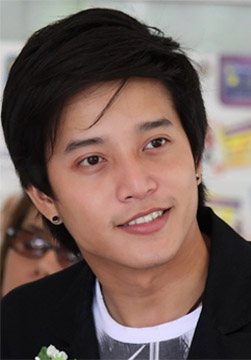
- Kiatkamol in 2008
- Born: May 7, 1983 (age 42); Bangkok, Thailand
- Other names: ตุ้ย; Tui; Tui AF; Tui AF3
- Occupations: Singer; actor
- Years active: 2006–present
- Height: 1.75 m (5 ft 9 in)
- Website: Official website

Kiatkamol Lata (Thai: เกียรติกมล ล่าทา) (aka. Tui Thai: ตุ้ย ) (born on May 7, 1983) is a Thai singer and actor. He first gained notice by winning Thailand's True Visions Academy Fantasia Season 3, a famous American Idol-like reality show in Thailand. Due to the popularity of the show, people usually called the contestants' names followed by the term "AF"; as a result, Kiatkamol also became known as "Tui AF" (Thai: ตุ้ย AF) or "Tui AF3" (Thai: ตุ้ย AF3).

== Biography ==
Kiatkamol Lata was born in Bangkok, Thailand to a family as an only child. He graduated from Rajamangala University of Technology Phra Nakhon with a bachelor's degree of Business Administration (Majoring in Finance). After graduation, he worked at Thai Health Promotion Foundation, where he was part of the team to promote an "anti drink-drive" campaign – he worked there for three months, then decided to audition for Academy Fantasia Season 3.

=== Academy Fantasia ===
In 2006, Kiatkamol auditioned for Academy Fantasia Season 3 and became one of the final 12 contestants to participate in the show. His run on Academy Fantasia was considered one of the most successful runs in the history of Thailand's Academy Fantasia, as he was one of the three persons who has never been at the bottom three (the others were Jeen AF1 and Good AF5) from 72 contestants of Season1-5. Kiatkamol is also considered one of the most successful artists from reality contests in Thailand.

- Surprise of the Season

Thailand's Academy Fantasia has always been famous for creating surprises for their fans. Surprise of Season 3 occurred on Week No. 6 when the host, Toi-Settha, announced that Kiatkamol was to leave the show. As Kiatkamol was one of the frontrunners of the season, this so-called elimination shocked the whole audience. However, Toi-Settha then revealed that Kiatkamol was to leave the show for a few days only and that was because he won the highest number of votes of the week. Kiatkamol was rewarded with a trip to Hong Kong with his mother, and to visit Hong Kong's major TV station, TVB where he participated in a promotional event with Ron Ng Cheuk Hei, a Hong Kong actor and singer.

== Music career ==
After his successful run on Academy Fantasia, Kiatkamol released his first single "Aok Huk Mai Wa" – a pop dance song, which was on many music charts during its release. Half a year later, Kiatkamol released his solo album, Tui : A Rock On Earth, where he went back to his favorite genre, pop rock. From this album Kiatkamol was nominated and won some artist polls and awards. Popular songs from this album included, Takieng Kub Tawan, an ending theme song for Kiatkamol's lakorn debut "Phoo Kong Yod Rak", and Hai Krai Ma Rak Noi, which won Popular Songs of the Year 2007 from Virgin Hitz Award 2007.

- Vocal Cord Surgery

In 2008, before Jo Jo San AF the Musical began, Kiatkamol was diagnosed with a cyst on his vocal cord. Kiatkamol said that his voice often got hoarse after performances and as time went by his voice hardly came back to normal. He waited until the run of the play was over to have it removed on September 17, 2008 and was forbidden to speak for one month.

== Acting career ==
In addition to singing, Kiatkamol has also acted in many productions. His first TV series, Phoo Kong Yod Rak, in which he paired up with Diana Chung, won the most popular TV-series from KomChadLuek Award#5. After the success of Phoo Kong Yod Rak, Kiatkamol also participated in AF's first musical production "Ngern Ngern Ngern", which he garnered a good review from Bangkok Post on his singing – calling his rendition of Classical love songs with his partner in the show both arresting and transporting.

Kiatkamol's first participation with Channel 3 was "Tueng Rai Kor Rak" in which he co-starred with Paul Pattarapol and Namfon Patcharin. He signed lakorn contract with Channel 3 and started having more lakorns with the channel. In 2008, he starred opposite Ploy-Chermarn Boonyasak in "Botan Gleeb Sud Tai" and had to take some lessons of Chinese Opera for the role. In 2009, Kiatkamol was back to work with Namfon Patcharin again in Look Sao Kam Nan, a musical lakorn where he played a new deputy trying to win the heart of a tomboy daughter of the mayor.

=== Handle Me With Care ===
In 2008, Kiatkamol was chosen by the producer, Jira Maligool to be in Kongdej Jaturanrasamee's Handle Me With Care (aka. Kod) and to co-star with Kratae – Supaksorn Chaimongkol. Kiatkamol played Kwan, a three-armed man in search of his meaning of life. Kiatkamol gave an interview that this was a very challenging role for him and Kongdej had helped him a lot in understanding the role. As the filming progressed, he began to get comfortable with having two left arms and thought it looked special. By the time the filming ended, he became so engrossed with the role that when his "extra" arm was taken out, he felt something was missing.

Kod did not do well at Thailand's box office at the time of its release and opened with mixed reviews, but was quite popular with the film festival circuits and was shown in various festivals such as Hong Kong International Film Festival 2008, Udine Far East Film Festival 2008, Munich Film Festival 2008, Montreal Fantasia Festival 2008, and 2008 Taipei Golden Horse Film Festival.

"Handle Me With Care" has been nominated for Best Foreign Film, The Arri-Zeiss Award at 26th Filmfest Munchen 2008 in Germany; and for Best Picture, in International Competition at 2nd Chungmuro International Film Festival 2008 in Korea. It won the Mental Health Media Award 2008 from Department of Mental Health, Ministry of Public Health of Thailand.

Kiatkamol received good reviews for his acting in Handle Me With Care, and was nominated Best Actor from associations such as Thailand National Film Association Awards (Supannahong), Bangkok Critics Assembly and others. Then he went on to win his first acting award from 6th Kom Chad Luek Awards for Best Actor from this movie.

== Works ==
=== Discography ===
- 2006: [AF3 Group Album] AF3 School Bus – Single : Aok Huk Mai Wa
- 2007: [AF OST Album] AF The Musical, Ngern Ngern Ngern (Money Money Money) – Single : Yard Pett
- 2007: [Solo Album] Tui : A Rock On Earth
- 2007: [Single] : Rak Tong Som (Title song of Sitcom: Rak Tong Som)
- 2008: [AF OST Album] AF The Musical, JoJo San
- 2009: [Lakorn OST Album] Look Sao Kam Nan Vol.1–2
- 2010: The Winners Project

=== Filmography ===
- 2007: [TV Series] Phoo Kong Yod Rak as Paan Namsupaan
- 2007: [Sitcom] Rak Tong Som (2007–2008) (aka. Love Repair) as Chaidan
- 2007: [Sitcom] Raberd Terd Terng as Chang Yai (Guest Appearance, 1 Episode; October 2007)
- 2008: [Film] Handle Me With Care as Kwan
- 2008: [TV Series] Tueng Rai Kor Rak as Kasama
- 2008: [TV Series] Botan Gleeb Sood Tai as Ah Long
- 2009: [TV Series] Look Sao Kam Nan as Palad Chaiya
- 2009: [Sitcom] Tevada Satu as Chaiyo (Guest Appearance, 1 Episode; May 3, 2009)
- 2009: [TV Series] Phoo Yai Lee Gub Nang Ma as Pradit
- 2010: [TV Series] Keuy Bann Nok as Kamnuan
- 2010: [TV Series] Jong Kol King Tien as Apphan
- 2010: [TV Series] Sapai Jao Sua as Traiwit
- 2011: [TV Series] Chuen Cheeva Navy as Captain Nawin
- 2011: [TV Series] Ngao Prye as Ratchata
- 2011: [TV Series] Nai Sudza Kha Sudzab as Rafah
- 2012: [TV Series] Khunsuek as Somboon

=== Musicals/Plays ===
- 2007: AF The Musical : Ngern Ngern Ngern (Money Money Money), as Kroo Rangsan
- 2008: AF The Musical : Jo Jo San (adapted from Giacomo Puccini's Cio-Cio San aka. Madama Butterfly), as B.F. Pinkerton

=== Host ===
- 2007: Click Club (True Visions Channel 21)

=== Ads ===
- 2006: Presenter Pepsi
- 2006–2007: Presenter Tesco Lotus
- 2006–2007: Brand Ambassador Gillette Vector Plus
- 2006–2007: Brand Ambassador Honda Click Play
- 2008: Presenter True Visions Sim
- 2009: Presenter True Visions Freeview Package
- 2009: Presenter Dr.Taco
- 2010: Presenter True Move Sim
- 2010: Presenter CP Chicken with spicy source

=== Television Drama ===
- 2018 Lom Phrai Pook Rak

== Awards and nominations ==
Year	Award	Result	Category	From
2006	True Academy Fantasia Season 3	Won	Winner of True Academy Fantasia Season3	N/A
2007	Thailand National Youth Bureau Awards	Won	Best Young Artist Role Model in Filial Son Category	N/A
2008	5th Kom Chad Luek Awards	Won	Most Popular Male Singer	A Rock on Earth (Album)
2008	3rd Seed Awards	Won	New Artist of the Year	A Rock on Earth (Album)
2008	Virgin Hitz Awards	Won	Popular Songs of the Year	Song "Hai Krai Ma Rak Noi", A Rock on Earth (Album)
2008	Virgin Hitz Awards	Nominated	Most Popular Male Artist	A Rock on Earth (Album)
2008	The National Council on Social Welfare of Thailand	Won	The Filial Son Award in Artist Category	N/A
2008	TV Pool Tops Award 2007	Nominated	Most Promising New Actor	Phoo Kong Yod Ruk (TV Series)
2009	18th Thailand National Film Association Awards (Supannahong)	Nominated	Best Actor	Handle Me With Care
2009	17th Bangkok Critics Assembly Awards	Nominated	Best Actor	Handle Me With Care
2009	6th Kom Chad Luek Awards	Won	Best Actor	Handle Me With Care
2009	6th Kom Chad Luek Awards	Won	Most Popular Actor	N/A
2009	6th Starpics Thai Film Awards	Nominated	Best Actor	Handle Me With Care
2009	6th Hamburger Magazine Awards	Nominated	Best Actor	Handle Me With Care
2009	TV Pool Tops Awards 2008	Nominated	Best Actor	Handle Me With Care
2009	6th Chalermthai Awards	Nominated	Best Actor of the Year	Handle Me With Care
2009	23rd TV Gold Awards	Nominated	Best Actor	Rak Tong Som
2009	49th Monte Carlo Television Festival Golden Nymph Awards	Nominated	Outstanding Actor (Drama)	Rak Tong Som; nominated along with Pongsak Pongsuwan
2009	7th Star Entertainment Awards	Nominated	Best Actor	Handle Me With Care
