= Dao Bandon =

Thai luk thung and mor lam singer-songwriter

Dao Bandon ดาว บ้านดอน
- Born: Tiem Seksiri; 4 January 1947 (age 79); Yasothon, Thailand
- Genres: Luk Thung; mor lam
- Occupations: Singer-songwriter; producer
- Years active: 1970–present

Dao Bandon (Thai: ดาว บ้านดอน) (born 4 January 1947), is a Thai Luk thung and Mor lam singer-songwriter. He became popular with his song Khon Khee Lang Kway (Thai: คนขี่หลังควาย, English: A Man On A Buffalo), released in 1977. He has composed many songs for the Thai superstar singer, Jintara Poonlarp, including Rak Salai Dokfai Ban, Jao Bao Hai and Pha Mai Ai Lueam.

== Early life and music career ==
Dao Bandon's real name is Tiem Seksiri (Thai: เทียม เศิกศิริ). He was born in Yasothon Province. He has seven siblings and since his family was very poor, he left school after grade four. His good memory led him to become a monk.

Tepphabut Satiroadchomphoo suggested to him that he begin singing on stage, so he left the Buddhist monkhood. He began singing on stage in 1977 and gained popularity with the song "Khon Khee Lang Kwai", which he both composed and sang. He then started to write more songs and he built up a reputation for a Mor lam superstar singer Jintara Poonlarp with the song Rak Salai Dokfai Ban in 1998.

== Discography ==
=== Songs ===
- Khon Khee Lang Kway
- Ror Rak Tay Ton Kradon

=== Songwriting ===
Year	Song	Album	Artist(s)	Lyrics	Music	Vocal
1977	"Khon Khee Lang Kway"	Khon Khee Lang Kway	Himself	Yes	Yes	Yes
1978	"Prae Jah"	Prae Jah	Himself	Yes	Yes	Yes
1986	"Phitwang Yang Yimdai"	Phitwang Yang Yimdai	Rungthiwa Fahamphai	Yes	Yes	No
1990	"Ku Lab Daeng"	Ku Lab Daeng	Somjit Borthong	Yes	Yes	No
1991	"Nam Ta Loan Bon Tee Non"	Honey Sri-Isan 1	Honey Sri-Isan	Yes	Yes	No
1991	"Woan Phee Mee Rak Dieaw"	Honey Sri-Isan 2	Honey Sri-Isan	Yes	Yes	No
1991	"Mai Jampen Tong Hen Kan"	n/a	Siengphin Thin-Lsan	Yes	Yes	No
1993	"Jao Bao Hai"	Jintara Poonlarp 16	Jintara Poonlarp	Yes	Yes	No
1997	"Rak Plo Sano Yaem"	Jintara Poonlarp 24	Jintara Poonlarp	Yes	Yes	No
1997	"Rak Phang Tee Wang Sam Mor"	Jintara Poonlarp 24	Jintara Poonlarp	Yes	Yes	No
1998	"Rak Salai Dokfai Ban"	Mor lam sa on 1	Jintara Poonlarp	Yes	Yes	No
2000	"Namta Lon Bon Tieng Na"	Mor lam sa on 3	Jintara Poonlarp	Yes	Yes	No
2001	"Nam Ta Yard Khang Phra Thad Na Doon"	Mor lam sa on 5	Jintara Poonlarp	Yes	Yes	No
2001	"Kor Moon Mark Mai Yark Rak"	n/a	Saengaroon Boonyoo	Yes	Yes	No
2001	"Rak Phang Lang Songkran"	n/a	Saengaroon Boonyoo	Yes	Yes	No
2001	"Phitwang Yang Kin Khao Zab" (Parody music from "Phitwang Yang Yimdai")	n/a	Ratchada Phalaphon	Yes	Yes	No
2007	"Pha Pa Nam Ta Sueam"	Mor lam sa on 13	Jintara Poonlarp	Yes	Yes	No
2018	"Rak Phai Thee Kaeng Saphue"	Single	Dokaor Thoongthong	Yes	Yes	No
2018	"Pha Nam Yoei"	Single	Jintara Poonlarp	Yes	Yes	No
2018	"Nam Ta Loan Bon Bua Daeng"	Single	Jintara Poonlarp	Yes	Yes	No
2019	"Pha Mai Ai Lueam"	Single	Jintara Poonlarp	Yes	Yes	No
2020	"Covid Ma Nam Ta Lai"	Single	Jintara Poonlarp	Yes	Yes	No
