= Kantong Tungngern =

Thai singer (born 1988)

Kantong Tungngern ก้านตอง ทุ่งเงิน
- Born: Piyada Bunmee (Thai: พิยะดา บุญมี); 29 February 1988 (age 38); Buntharik district, Ubon Ratchathani Province, Thailand
- Genres: Luk thung
- Occupations: Singer, actress
- Years active: 2008–present
- Labels: Grammy Gold, GMM Music

Kantong Tungngern (Thai: ก้านตอง ทุ่งเงิน; born 29 February 1988) is a Thai luk thung singer and actress from Buntharik district, Ubon Ratchathani Province. She records for GMM Grammy.

== Early life ==
Born Piyada Bunmee on 29 February 1988 in Ban Non Kho, Nong Kho Subdistrict, Buntharik District, Ubon Ratchathani Province, Kantong Tungngern is the youngest of five siblings, with two sisters and two brothers. Her parents were Sanga Bunmee and Samran Bunmee. She completed her primary education at Ban Non Kho School and later graduated from Rattana Bundit University. She began singing at the age of five and pursued performing to help fund her education.

== Career ==
Tungngern began her professional career in 2008. She gained wider recognition through the song Jue Bor, which accumulated over 14 million streams on Spotify by September 2024.

== Personal life ==
Tungngern is the younger sister of Dokaor Toongtong, also a prominent luk thung singer. Prior to achieving commercial success, she used part of her income to purchase a house for her mother.

== Discography ==
=== Singles ===
Year	Title	Notes
2015	"Ber Toon Kee Tua"	With Dokaor Toongtong; originally performed by Siriporn Ampaipong
2016	"Low Soo Lharn Fung" (Cover Version)	originally performed by Sala Khunnawut
2017	"Gub Kam Sa Ai"	originally performed by Mike Phiromphon
2017	"Bau Huk Ga Hai Loo Ton"	
2018	"Kid Hord Poo Bao Sa Baeng"	
2018	"Ya Hai Kow Hoo Der"	originally performed by Phai Phongsathon
2018	"Kerng Jai"	
2019	"Yang Hai Noi Pai Eik Bor"	
2019	"Tua Chuai Tee Bau Dai Chern"	originally performed by Tai Orathai
2019	"Sow Mor Hin Kow"	
2020	"Nai Kwarm Kid Hord Mee Tae Ai Poo Diew"	Response song to "Nai Kwarm Kued Hord Mee Tae Jow Poo Diew" by Mike Phiromphon
2024	"Jue Bor"	
2024	"Nam Ta Bor Maen Kamtop"	
2025	"Kularp"	
2025	"Kae Bon"	

=== Collaborations ===
- 2009 – Sung Nang Kang Pon (with Ekkapol Montrakarn)
- 2009 – Sarawan Song Sarn Jai (with Kaothip Tidadin and Newkoy Kannikar)
- 2011 – Luem Kow Terd Hua Jai (with Mod Ubonmanee)

== Special albums ==
#	Album
1st	น้องใหม่ไต่ดาว โครงการพิเศษ ชุดรำวง น้องใหม่บันเทิงศิลป์ (Nong Mhai Tai Dao Krong Karn Piset Chut Ram Wong Nong Mhai Bun Terng Sin): Released: 24 March 2011; Label: GMM Grammy
2nd	เอื้อย-น้อง-ร้องลำ (Euei Nong Rong Lam): Released: 15 March 2012; Label: GMM Grammy
3rd	มัน ม่วน แซบ (Mun Muan Saab): Released: 14 March 2013; Label: GMM Grammy
4th	มัน ม่วน แซบ 2 (Mun Muan Saab 2): Released: 25 Sebtember 2014; Label: GMM Grammy
5th	มัน ม่วน แซบ 3 (Mun Muan Saab 3): Released: 11 December 2015; Label: GMM Grammy

== Filmography ==
=== TV Series ===
Year	Title	Role	TV Network
2015	Mad Ded Sing Thong (หมัดเด็ดเสียงทอง)	ตอง (Tong)	Channel 9 MCOT HD

== Other songs ==
- เทพธิดาปลาร้า (Tep Thi Da Pla Lah)
