= Ong Bak 2 =

- Thai Poster
- Directed by: Tony Jaa; Panna Rittikrai
- Screenplay by: Ek Iemchuen; Nonthakorn Thaweesuk
- Story by: Tony Jaa; Panna Rittikrai
- Produced by: Prachya Pinkaew; Tony Jaa; Panna Rittikrai; Akarapol Techaratanaprasert
- Starring: Tony Jaa
- Cinematography: Nattawut Kittikhun
- Edited by: Nonthakorn Thaweesuk; Saravut Nakajud
- Music by: Terdsak Janpan
- Distributed by: Sahamongkol Film International
- Release date: December 4, 2008
- Running time: 98 minutes
- Country: Thailand
- Language: Thai
- Budget: $8 million
- Box office: $8.9 million

Ong Bak 2 (Thai: องค์บาก 2) is a 2008 Thai martial arts film co-directed by Panna Rittikrai and Tony Jaa, who also stars in the lead role. It is the standalone prequel to the 2003 film Ong-Bak and is set in 15th century Thailand. In the film, Tien trains himself in martial arts, where he becomes a lethal soldier and sets out to avenge his parents' death.

The film was released on 4 December 2008 and became a success at the box office. A sequel titled Ong Bak 3 was released in 2010.

== Plot ==
In 1431 Siam, during the reign of Borommarachathirat II of the Ayutthaya Kingdom, Tien is the young son of a noble family, whose father Lord Sihadecho sends him to learn dance in a remote village under Master Bua instead of making him a warrior. Sihadecho wants Tien to be safe from the commander of the Ayutthaya royal guard Lord Rajasena, who has plotted against his family. Although the young Tien disdains his peaceful life, he eventually befriends an orphan girl named Pim. Lord Sihadecho is betrayed by one of their own guards, who attempts to kidnap a returning Tien, but the boy manages to flee. At the same time, Sihadecho and his household are massacred by Lord Rajasena and a mysterious masked assassin.

Tien is forced to flee from enemy soldiers and manages to escape to the forest, where he is captured by slave traders. Tien's resistance leads the traders to throw him into a pool with a Siamese crocodile, but a band of bandits and martial artists called the Pha Beek Khrut ("Garuda Wing Cliff") attacks the traders. Their leader Chernang saves Tien from the crocodile, intrigued by his physical prowess and sheer willpower. They take him to their village, where their soothsayer claims that Tien is destined to become a great warrior and Chernang offers him to become one of them, which Tien accepts.

Years later, Tien is tested through fighting in order to become a true member of the Pha Beek Khrut. After Tien passes, Chernang proclaims him as his adopted son and Tien becomes the field leader of the bandits. Tien tracks down his old slave traders and thrashes them, throwing their leader to the crocodiles as he previously did to him. Tien makes then a blood oath to avenge his family, which Chernang encourages him to fulfill, promising him to make him their new leader upon his return. Tien travels alone to Rajasena's palace, where the lord is hosting a party to proclaim himself king of his newly conquered lands. After a dance coincidentally performed by a grown-up Pim, Tien sneaks in dressed as a khon dancer himself and attacks Rajasena, apparently cutting the treacherous lord down.

Tien returns to the Pha Beek Khrut village, but finds it empty, and is instead confronted by the masked assassin that killed his father. Tien attacks him, but more masked attackers emerge. After a lengthy battle, Tien eventually overcomes them with the help of an elephant, but meets his match at the hands of a final opponent named Bhuti Sangkha ("Crow Ghost"), a sinister yet formidable martial artist. Bhuti defeats Tien and takes the elephant away, leaving him at the mercy of Lord Rajasena and his army. The lord turns out to have survived the assassination thanks to hidden armor, and reveals that the masked assassin is none other than Chernang, who must now finish his job from years ago in exchange for Rajasena pardoning his bandits.

Tien reluctantly fights Chernang, who pins Tien down and acknowledges him as his son and asks him to accept his own life to avenge his father. Chernang then causes the blade of Tien's sword to snap and slash across his throat, killing himself. Exhausted and devastated, Tien collapses on the ground surrounded by the soldiers, where Rajasena orders Tien to be slowly tortured to death. A voiceover informs Tien suffers this fate due to his bad karma, but adds that he might find a way to cheat death. An ambiguous scene shows Tien with a fully-grown beard standing in front of the Ong Bak Buddha statue.

== Cast ==
- Tony Jaa as Tien
- Nirut Sirijanya as Master Bua
- Sorapong Chatree as Chernang
- Sarunyoo Wongkrachang as Lord Rajasena
- Santisuk Promsiri as Lord Sihadecho
- Primorata Dejudom as Pim
- Natdanai Kongthong as Young Tien
- Prarinya Karmkeaw as Young Pim
- Patthama Panthong as Lady Plai
- Petchtai Wongkamlao as Mhen
- Dan Chupong as Bhuti Sangkha / Crow Ghost (uncredited)
- Supakorn Kitsuwon as Guard in Golden Armour (uncredited)
- Tim Man as Black Ninja
- Jaran Ngamdee
- Somdet Kaew-ler
- Kaecha Kampakdee (as Gaesha Kumpakdee)

== Production ==
Shooting of the film began in October 2006. It was released in Thailand on December 5, 2008. In July 2008, rumor surfaced that Tony Jaa had disappeared from the production set. Prachya Pinkaew commented to the press that Tony Jaa had disappeared from the set for almost two months, leaving the film unfinished and that the delay caused more than 250 million baht damage due to the breach of contract with the Weinstein Company who had also canceled the contract. Later in an interview with the press, Tony Jaa stated that the production was on hiatus because Sahamongkol Film could not release the obligated funding for the film. Sources within Ayara Film, the subsidiary of Sahamongkol Film that handled Ong Bak 2 production, claimed that no more funding came from Sahamongkol after it took over the budget and management role from Tony Jaa from May to July 2008.

Tony Jaa and the owner of Sahamongkol Film later made a joint press conference stating that the production and funding would continue after several concessions were agreed upon between Tony Jaa and Sahamongkol. Famed Thai action choreographer and Jaa's mentor Panna Rittikrai was brought onto the project in the capacity of director to help complete the film. In addition, Rittikrai added martial artist Dan Chupong to the cast.

An international trailer for the film was released during filming, showing the fictional setting in which Tony Jaa's character is being rescued in the jungle by a group of martial artists of various styles, and trained to unify these different systems. However, production still encountered financial problems as it came to a close. In order to complete the production on time, the filmmakers decided to end Ong Bak 2 with a cliffhanger ending, and then continue the story in a sequel, Ong Bak 3, which was announced to begin production for a 2009 release.

== Distribution ==
Worldwide distribution and sales rights to Ong Bak 2 were purchased by The Weinstein Company in March 2006. A little over a year later, Harvey Weinstein visited Bangkok and renegotiated a deal in which Sahamongkol Film International bought back most of the rights to the film, except for North America, which The Weinstein Company retains. At the 2007 Cannes Film Festival market, Sahamongkol sold some rights to Germany-based Splendid Films.

In February 2009, Wagner/Cuban Companies' Magnolia Pictures acquired the U.S. distribution rights for Ong Bak 2 under their Magnet label. The deal was negotiated by Tom Quinn, Senior Vice President of Magnolia, with Gilbert Lim of Sahamongkol Film International.

== Reception ==
The film holds a 49% rating on Rotten Tomatoes based on 70 reviews. The site's consensus reads: "It suffers from comparisons to its predecessor, not to mention Tony Jaa's less-than-nimble direction, but Ong Bak 2 has all the extravagant violence and playful style that fans of the original will expect".

Despite political turmoil in the film's native Thailand, in its opening weekend (8 December 2008) Ong Bak 2 grossed about 58 million baht ($2.06 million), according to Variety Asia Online, and was number one at the Thai box office. Ong Bak 2 did better at the Thai box office than Tony Jaa's previous film, Tom-Yum-Goong.

The film was praised by the variety of martial arts showcased, including muay boran and krabi krabong, Japanese kenjutsu and ninjutsu, Indian Kalaripayattu, Malay silat, as well as various Chinese martial arts. Jaa also showcased weapons such as the ninjatō, katana, jian, dao, talwar, nunchaku, rope dart, and three-section staff.

== Home video ==
There have been numerous DVD releases of Ong Bak 2. Various versions with regional subtitles and dubbings were released throughout Asia, South America, Australia and New Zealand in the months shortly after the film's premiere in its native Thailand. The film was released for the European film market on 6 February 2009. The United States version was released on February 2, 2010, although it is already available in English language version. A bootleg all-region-compatible version with English subtitles of Ong-Bak 2 was internationally released on April 2, 2009 on DVD, although this version is not as yet widely available. There are no significant reviews, such as on Rotten Tomatoes, yet.

== Sequel ==
With the box office success of Ong Bak 2, Sahamongkol Film International was quick to announce their intention to film its sequel. Filming of new footage for the follow-up was to begin before the end of the year and was to incorporate unused footage from Ong Bak 2. Kongdej Jaturanrasamee, screenwriter of the Thai fantasy film Queens of Langkasuka, was signed to write the script. In addition, the expensive set for the Khmer Palace was completed and seen by the press. Ong Bak 3 was released in May 2010.

The film features more fights between Tony Jaa and Dan Chupong (the uncredited actor behind the mysterious, enigmatic and deadly "crow ghost" in Ong Bak 2, the only enemy who really gets the drop on Tien in the film).

== Video game ==
Ong Bak Tri, a video game based on Ong Bak films, was in development by Studio Hive and was to be published worldwide by Immanitas Entertainment for PC, smartphones, PlayStation Network, and Xbox Live Marketplace. The game was intended to be 2.5D side-scrolling brawler with "intense fighting action, impressive free-running sequences, and highly cinematic quick-time action events", according to the press release. The game, like the second and third films, was to be set in ancient Thailand. No official release date has been announced and the project was presumably canceled.
