= Art of the Devil =

- Theatrical poster
- Directed by: Tanit Jitnukul
- Written by: Ghost Gypsy
- Produced by: Charoen Iamphungporn
- Starring: Arisa Wills; Supakson Chaimongkol; Krongthong Rachatawan; Tin Settachoke; Somchai Satuthum
- Cinematography: Tanai Nimchareonpong; Thaya Nimcharoenpong
- Edited by: Sunij Asavinikul
- Music by: Thippatai Pirompak
- Distributed by: Five Star Production
- Release date: 17 June 2004
- Running time: 96 minutes
- Country: Thailand
- Language: Thai

Art of the Devil (Thai: คนเล่นของ or Khon len khong) is a 2004 Thai horror film directed by Tanit Jitnukul. It has two titular sequels, Art of the Devil 2 (2005) and Art of the Devil 3 (2008), but these films feature a different story with new characters.

== Plot ==
Art of the Devil tells the story of Boom (Supaksorn Chaimongkol), a young Thai girl who meets a married man named Prathan (Tin Settachoke) and his male friends at a country club where she works. The two soon begin an affair, and Boom finds herself pregnant afterwards. When she breaks the news to Prathan, he was initially not elated about the pregnancy, and questions Boom if he is the real father of her baby. Then Prathan inquires Boom how much money she needs in exchange for her silence, to which Boom disappointedly requests for a large sum. After giving her the required sum, Prathan appears to have a change of heart, reassuring Boom that he will not leave her.

However, Boom wakes up in the middle of the night to find Prathan talking to his friends, who are behind the window of Prathan’s beach house. Prathan informs her that for the large amount of money he paid her earlier, he had the right to share her with his friends. While Prathan wields a video camera, his friends chase a terrified and screaming Boom out of the room and onto the beach, where they humiliate and apparently gang-rape her. It is revealed that Prathan never had any intention to continue his affair with Boom after her pregnancy.

After getting an ultrasound at the hospital (revealing that her child has some abnormalities), Boom spots Prathan at a restaurant with his family of his second marriage celebrating his youngest daughter’s birthday. Before going to Prathan, Boom receives a call from her friend. Boom’s friend advises her to have an abortion, because she’s sure that Prathan would not acknowledge the unborn child. However Boom refuses, and reminds her friend that she’s keeping her baby regardless of Prathan’s acknowledgment as the father. However, according to Boom’s OB/GYN, the baby has some congenital abnormalities and will not be able to have a normal life. Soon after, Boom shows up at the restaurant, interrupting the celebration, and informs Prathan that the sum of money he had given her was not enough and that she needs an additional amount. In embarrassment, Prathan drags Boom outside, slaps her, and warns her not to come near his family again, before tossing a wad of cash at her; shouting that it will be the last time that he’ll be giving her money.

Furious, Boom enlists the aid of a black magic shaman to exact revenge on her ex-lover, his friends (for the gang rape), and his entire family, notably causing the second eldest son to shoot his girlfriend and his little sister before turning the gun on himself. Prathan was found dead at his beach house by his latest mistress.

After their deaths, Boom visits the shaman and learns that if she donates coffins equal to the number of victims for the spirits, they will not bother her. She makes some offerings at the temple as instructed by the shaman. While leaving the temple, she sees the ghosts of her victims in the back of a car and steps off of the sidewalk to get a better look, whereupon she is hit by a car. The resulting accident causes her to lose her baby.

Prathan's first wife, Kamala inherits his fortune. She and her four children move into the house. Boom again uses black magic to kill this new family off. However, her motive this time is not for revenge, but in order to claim the inheritance. A young newspaper reporter becomes suspicious, so Boom arranges for his death, as well. Throughout this, the ghost of Boom's dead daughter is seen around the house.

The story ends with only the youngest son, Bon and eldest daughter, Nan surviving the massacre. Boom voluntarily falls to her death from the roof of the hospital after seeing her daughter's ghost.

== Cast ==
- Arisa Wills as Nan
- Supakson Chaimongkol as Boom
- Krongthong Rachatawan as Kamala
- Tin Settachoke as Prathan
- Somchai Satuthum as Danai
- Isara Ochakul as Ruj
- Nirut Sutchart as Neng
- Krittayod Thimnate as Bon

== Reception ==
Art of the Devil premiered on June 17, 2004, and was the No. 4 film its opening weekend, behind Around the World in 80 Days, Harry Potter and the Prisoner of Azkaban, and The Punisher. It stayed in the No. 4 spot for two more weeks before moving to No. 5 in its fourth week at the box office.

== See also ==
- List of ghost films
