= Dan Chupong =

Thai martial artist and actor

- ชูพงษ์ ช่างปรุง
- Born: Chupong Changprung; March 23, 1981 (age 45); Kalasin, Thailand
- Other names: Deaw; Dan; Danny Chu
- Occupations: Actor; martial artist; action choreographer; martial arts; choreographer; stunt man; director
- Years active: 2003—present

Chupong Changprung (Thai; ชูพงษ์ ช่างปรุง, RTGS: Dan Chupong; born March 23, 1981, in Kalasin Province, Thailand; Thai nickname: "Deaw", เดี่ยว) is a Thai actor, martial artist and stuntman. He is also known by his Westernized name, Dan Chupong (the given name is alternatively spelled Choopong or Choupong and the first name is sometimes Danny). Starting out as part of the stunt team of martial-arts choreographer Panna Rittikrai, Chupong's first film credit was as "Bodyguard 4" in the 2003 film Ong-Bak. He then went on to leading roles in the 2004 film Born to Fight and 2006 film Dynamite Warrior. He has also appeared in Nonzee Nimibutr's Queen of Langkasuka (2008), Somtum (2008), Ong Bak 2 (uncredited) and portrayed the main antagonist in Ong Bak 3 (2010). He graduated with a bachelor's degree from Srinakarinwirot Institute of Physical Education

To stay in shape for his film roles, Chupong has a regular workout routine that includes running and gymnastics. He took acting lessons to prepare for his role in Dynamite Warrior.

== Filmography ==
Year	Title	Role	Note	Reference
2003	Ong-Bak	Bodyguard 4		
2004	Born to Fight	Deaw	He as first role in movie	
2006	Dynamite Warrior	Siang	Lead actor and martial arts	
2008	Somtum (film)	Lieutenant Pong	Special Appearance	
2008	Queens of Langkasuka	General Commander Jarang		
2008	Ong Bak 2	Bhuti Sangkha / Crow Ghost		
2010	Ong Bak 3	Bhuti Sangkha / Crow Ghost		
2014	Vengeance of an Assassin	Thee		
2016	The Last Assignment	Dan		
2016	Khun Pan	Sang		
2017	Oversized Cops	Khem	Special Appearance	
2020	The Kill List (TV- Movie)	Jack		
2020	Monster Hunter (film)		Stunt double: Tony Jaa	
2023	Expend4bles	Bai		
2026	Death Whisperer: Saming the Werebeast	Thap		

== Television ==
Year	Thai title	Title	Role	Network	Notes	With
2016	เจ้าเวหา ตอน ฝั่งน้ำจรดฝั่งฟ้า		Mhad	True4U		
2016	ขุนกระทิง	The Reincarnation	Le-Kong-Win	Channel 7		
2017	เชลยศึก		Kroo-Theing	Channel 8	Cameo	
2017	แหวนปราบมาร		Than-Jit-ta-Theb	Channel 7		
2017	เล่ห์ลับสลับร่าง	Leh Lub Salub Rarng 2017	Stunt performer	Channel 3	Cameo	
2018	เล็บครุฑ		Stunt performer	Channel 7	Cameo	
2018	Monkey Twins วายุเทพยุทธ์	Monkey Twins	Sa-Ming	One 31		
2020	ล่าท้าชน		Stunt performer	Channel 7	Cameo	
2020	คุณแม่มาเฟีย		Stunt performer	GMM 25	Cameo	
2021	ดงพญาเย็น			One 31		
2023	ข้าวเหนียวทองคำ	Khao Niao Thong Kham	Thongchat	One 31		
2026	หงสาวดี	The Last Duel	Phra Maha Thera Kanchong	One 31		
