= Honey Sri-Isan =

- ฮันนี่ ศรีอีสาน
- Honey Sri-Isan in 1991
- Born: Suphin Hemvijit; 22 October 1971; Ban Moei, Dong Ling Sub-district, Kamalasai District, Kalasin Province, Thailand
- Died: 26 February 1992 (aged 20); Sisaket Province, Thailand
- Cause of death: road accident
- Other names: Sao Sieng Kammayee (Ailas); Phin (nickname)
- Occupation: Singer • Actress
- Notable work: Nam Ta Lon Bon Tee Non (1991)
- Musical career
- Genres: Luk thung; Mor lam
- Instrument: Vocal
- Years active: 1986–1992
- Labels: Yenawee Promotion

Suphin Hemvijit (Thai: สุพิณ เหมวิจิตร; 22 October 1971 – 26 February 1992), known professionally as Honey Sri-Isan (Thai: ฮันนี่ ศรีอีสาน), was a Thai Mor lam and Luk thung singer from Isan area. She recorded two albums during her musical career and, despite her short discography, enjoyed a good bit of fame. She was active for only two years due to her death in 1992 caused by a road accident. After her death, she is believed to have become a spirit and her fans have erected a shrine at the place of her death.

== Early life ==
Honey was born as Suphin Hemvijit on 22 October 1971 in Ban Moei, Dong Ling Sub-district, Kamalasai District, Kalasin Province in northeast Thailand. She was the daughter of Khamtha and Mee Hemvijit. In 1982, she completed her primary education.

== Musical career ==
Sri-Isan began her career in 1986 as a member of Mor lam band. In January 1991, she signed on as a singer with Yenawee Promotion. Her first studio album, Nam Ta Lon Bon Thee Non (น้ำตาหล่นบนที่นอน), was released on 25 January 1991, with songs written by Dao Bandon and produced by Num Phuthai. It was a success.

On October 8, 1991, she recorded her second album "Won Phee Mee Rak Dieaw" (วอนพี่มีรักเดียว), which was also well received by listeners. After that, she founded her own music band at the request of her fan club. Because of her premature death, her career in the music industry was short-lived.

== Death ==
Sri-Isan died in a road accident while returning from a show on 26 February 1992, in Sisaket Province, at the age of 20.

A shrine was built at the place of her death. Every year since her death in 1992, famous singers perform a concert in her memory. Many villagers believe that her spirit is still circulating in the area and still has not left the physical realm. As in the cases of Mae Nak and Mae Takien Thong, the spirit of Honey Sri-Isan is said to be a force of both benevolence and retribution. A handbook mentions that she sought revenge against a policeman who had touched her corpse in an inappropriate way, but she has also granted winning lottery numbers to the fans who created and expanded her shrine.

In 2015, a shrine was built in her home town Ban Moei.

== Discography ==
Title (Thai)	Title (Romanised)	Release date
Yenawee Promotion
น้ำตาหล่นบนที่นอน	Nam Ta Lon Bon Thee Non (English: Tears on the Bed)	January 1991
วอนพี่มีรักเดียว	Won Phee Mee Rak Dieaw	October 1991
