= Sarunyoo Wongkrachang =

Thai actor and singer (1960-2020)

- ศรัณยู วงษ์กระจ่าง
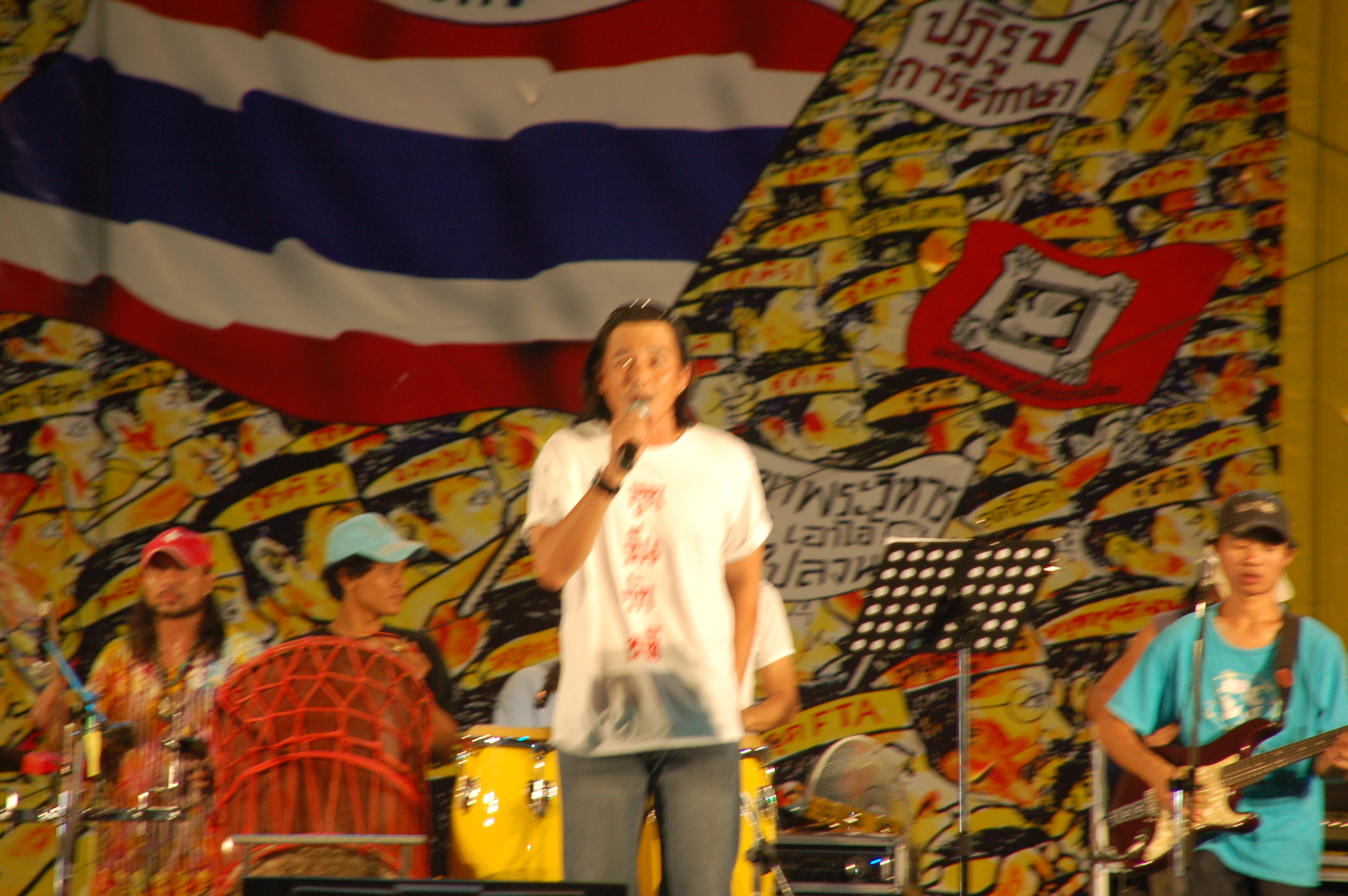
- Sarunyoo on PAD stage in 2008
- Born: 17 October 1960; Samut Songkhram, Thailand
- Died: 10 June 2020 (aged 59); King Chulalongkorn Memorial Hospital: The Thai Red Cross Society Bangkok, Thailand
- Other names: Tua; Narunyoo Wongkrachang
- Education: Architecture Chulalongkorn University
- Occupations: Actor; singer; director; TV host; activist; screenwriter; producer
- Years active: 1981–2020
- Spouse: Hattaya Wongkrachang (m. 1994)
- Children: 2
- Relatives: Thaneth Warakulnukroh (brother)
- Website: www.instagram.com/sarunyoo

Sarunyoo Wongkrachang or spelt Sarunyu Wongkrachang (Thai: ศรัณยู วงษ์กระจ่าง; nickname: Tua–ตั้ว; October 17, 1960 in Bang Khonthi District, Samut Songkhram Province, Thailand – June 10, 2020), was a Thai actor, singer, host, activist, screenwriter, director and producer. He was a producer of Thai TV dramas and was best known for his various TV drama roles, including Gao Ee Kao Nai Hong Dang (1984), Massaya (1985), Baan Sai Thong (1987), Jaosao Kong Arnon (1988), Rattikarn Yod Rak (1989), Wanalee (1990), Roymarn (1990), Wanida (1991), Tawipop (1992), Mon Rak Look Thoong (1995), Duay Rang Atittarn (1996) and Nai Hoy Tamil (2001).

Sarunyoo acted in more than 50 TV dramas, 20 films, and 20 stage plays, including Mon Rak Look Thoong which became the 3rd most-watched TV drama of all time in Thailand with a viewership rating of 36%. He won a Mekhala Award for Best Actor for his role in Tawipop.

Under the Saman Karn Lakorn company, Sarunyoo directed, screen-wrote and produced a stage play named Langkha Daeng and TV dramas for Channel 7 including Suparb Buroot Look Puchai (2003 and 2013), Hua Jai Tuan (2014), Roy Rak Rang Kaen (2015), and Ballang Hong (2016).

== Early life ==
Sarunyoo was born in Kradangnga, Bang Khonthi District, Samut Songkhram Province. His four siblings include famous singer and actor Thaneth Warakulnukroh but Sarunyoo was adopted by his own aunt whose surname he has been using ever since.

Sarunyoo completed his high school at Suankularb Wittayalai School Batch 92 and graduated with a bachelor's degree in architecture from Chulalongkorn University. He decided against pursuing an architectural career, telling BK in an interview that "The architecture faculty's acting club introduced me to what ultimately became the biggest part of my college life. After my third year, I knew that I didn't want to be an architect."

Sarunyoo played numerous main parts in "Lakorn 'Tapat" or Faculty of Architecture stage plays during his time in college, as well as in a few Faculty of Arts stage plays.

== Career ==
His first public appearance in Thailand's entertainment scene might be as a pin-up in an issue of Dichan magazine. Sarunyoo posed for many magazines during his early career. After graduation, Sarunyoo did many TV dramas, films, stage plays and he sang a lot of drama songs. Besides, he also joined his seniors from the Faculty of Architecture in a cult TV comedy show called "Petchakart Kwarm Kriad" televised on Channel 9.

Sarunyoo's TV drama debut was Kao Ee Kao Nai Hong Dang on Channel 3.

== Politics and activism ==
In 1998, when Thaksin Shinawatra founded the Thai Rak Thai party, he was one of the 100 party committee members. He proposed a policy to Thaksin, but his policy was not accepted.

In 2006 and 2008, he participated in the People's Alliance for Democracy (PAD) or Yellow Shirts, especially in 2008, becoming one of the leaders of the PAD.

== Legacy and impact ==
Because of his activism his life was affected, by being removed as a television host and from TV drama roles.

== Personal life ==
Sarunyoo married a famous radio DJ, and businesswoman Hattaya Katesang who was raised in London and came back to Thailand after graduation working for her mother's business as well as being a radio DJ. However, Hattaya met Sarunyoo who she co-starred with in the drama Dok Fah Lae Dome Pu Jong Hong (1989). They had twin daughters, Supara Wongkrachang (Look Noon) and Seetala Wongkrachang (Note: Also spelled and written as "Sitala Wongkrachang".) (Look Nang).

Seetala Wongkrachang was a member of the South Korean girl group H1-KEY from January to May 2022, when she left the group due to personal reasons.

== Death ==
Sarunyoo died on 10 June 2020 due to liver cancer at King Chulalongkorn Memorial Hospital.

== Filmography ==
=== Television ===
Title	Year	Credited as				Channel	Ref
Title	Year	Actor	Screen writer	Director	Role(s)	Channel	Ref
Luerd Kattiya	1983	Yes			Anothai	Ch3, broadcast banned	
Red Chair	1984	Yes			Burapa or Piak	Channel 3	
Baan Soi Dao	1984	Yes			Aer Tawan	Channel 7	
Ranad Ek	1985	Yes			Ek	Channel 7	
Massaya	1985	Yes			Lt. Luck Rattanamahasarn	Channel 7	
Kamanita-Vasitthi	1986	Yes			Kamanita	Channel 3	
Ta Le Luerd	1986		Yes			Channel 3	
Jittakorn	1986	Yes				Channel 7	
The House of Gold	1987	Yes			M.R. Paradapatrapee Sawangwong / Chai Klang	Channel 7	
Pojamarn Sawangwong	1987	Yes			M.R. Paradapatrapee Sawangwong / Chai Klang	Channel 7	
Buang Karm	1987	Yes				Channel 7	
Awasarn Salesman	1987	Yes	Yes		Chanapon / Pon	Channel 3	
Arsom Sang	1988	Yes			Naksit Suramethee	Channel 3	
ฺBorisat Jad Koo	1988	Yes				Channel 7	
Ta Yart	1988	Yes				Channel 3	
Game Kamathep	1988	Yes				Channel 3	
The Bride of Arnon	1988	Yes			Arnon Withayatorn	Channel 3	
Rattikarn Yod Rak	1989	Yes			Dr. Jakkrit Issaraluck	Channel 3	
Love Affair	1990	Yes			Pol.Capt. Siam / Sue Mued	Channel 3	
Hoad Laew Auan	1990	Yes	Yes			Channel 3	
Tur Keu Duang Dao	1990	Yes			Santiparp	Channel 5	
Theptida Bar 21	1990	Yes				Channel 3	
Somwang Manood Tod Long	1990	Yes			Somwang	Channel 3	
Roymarn	1990	Yes			Ooppama / Mark	Channel 3	
The Story of Wanida	1991	Yes	Yes		Maj. Prajak Mahasak / Yai	Channel 3	
Fai Shone Sang	1992	Yes			Chatchai	Channel 3	
Mia Naung God Mai	1992	Yes			Narain	Channel 5	
Nam Sau Sai	1993	Yes			Peem	Channel 7	
The Earth Between	1994	Yes			Khun Luang Akkarathepwarakorn	Channel 7	
Plai Fon Ton Nao	1994	Yes			Lai Kram	Channel 7	
Reun Pae	1995	Yes			Jane	Channel 5	
Prasart See Khao	1995	Yes			Treepimai / Tree	Channel 7	
The Music of Country Song	1995	Yes			Klao	Channel 7	
Duay Rang Atittarn	1996	Yes			Krit	Channel 7	
Tan Tawan	1997	Yes			Sarit	Channel 3	
Tawan Yor Sang	1997	Yes			Sakrapee / Alek	Channel 3	
Khemmarin - Inthira	1997	Yes			Khemmarin	Channel 5	
Kaew Jom Gaen	1997	Yes				Channel 5	
Duang Yee Wa	1998	Yes			Aman	Channel 3	
Thep Niyai Nai Sa Noa	1998	Yes		Yes		Channel 3	
Por Mai Tee Ded	1998	Yes				Channel 7	
Pa Lung Rak	1998	Yes				Channel 7	
She Wit Tee Paw Piang	1999	Yes			Shusheep	Channel 5	
Dome Thong	1999	Yes			Adit Sirodom / Chaopraya Sorasak Krai Narong	Channel 7	
Khun Poo Su Sa	1999	Yes				Channel 7	
Dung Sai Nam Lai	2000	Yes			Peerapat	Channel 7	
Nai Hoy Tamil	2001	Yes			Nai Hoy Kane	Channel 7	
Rak Kaung Fah	2001	Yes				Channel 7	
Nampoo	2002			Yes		Channel 7	
Maha Heng	2003	Yes				Channel 7	
Suparp Buroot Look Puchai	2003		Yes	Yes		Channel 7	
Langkha Daeng	2004	Yes	Yes	Yes	Dr.Sinngoen	Channel 7	
Mitr Chaibancha Maya Shewit	2005	Yes			Sor.Assanajinda	Channel 7	
Ror.Sor.112 Kon Thai Rak Paen Din	2005			Yes		Channel 5	
Lod Lai Mungkorn	2006	Yes			Liang	Channel 5	
Trab Sin Din Fah	2008			Yes		Channel 5	
Suparp Buroot Look Puchai	2013		Yes	Yes		Channel 7	
Hua Jai Tuen	2014		Yes	Yes		Channel 7	
Roy Rak Rang Kaen	2015		Yes	Yes		Channel 7	
Ban Lang Hong	2016		Yes	Yes		Channel 7	
Jong Rak Pak Dee	2016		Yes	Yes		Channel 7	
Diary Tootsies 2	2017	Yes			Win's father (guest appearance)	GMM25	
Club Friday The Series 9 (Rak Tee Mai Mee Jing)	2017	Yes				GMM25	
Sri Ayodhaya	2017	Yes			King Borommakot	True4U	
Dong Pu Dee	2017		Yes	Yes		Channel 8	

=== Film ===
Title	Year	Credited as				Note
Title	Year	Actor	Screen writer	Director	Role(s)	Note
Yah Bork Wa Ter Barb	1987	Yes				w/ Sinjai Hongthai
Goai	1989	Yes				
Hua Jai See See	1989	Yes			Watchara	w/ Lalita Panyopas
Kor Sheu Suthee Sam See Chart	1989	Yes			Suthee	
Len Gub Fai	1990	Yes			Prai	w/ Lalita Panyopas
Tan Khun Noi Noi Hang Siam	1993	Yes				
Blackbirds at Bangpleng	1994	Yes				
Bin Laek	1995	Yes				
Mahasajan Haeng Rak	1995	Yes			Pat	w/ Sinjai Hongthai
Ruan Mayura	1996	Yes			Khun Pra Nai	w/ Nusaba Wanichangkul
Sa Tang	2000	Yes				
The Legend of Suriyothai	2001	Yes			King Maha Chakkraphat	w/
Girl's Friends	2002	Yes			Tim's Father	
Soom Meu Peun	2005	Yes			Ith Umpawa	
13 Beloved	2006	Yes			Surachai	
The Passion Ammahit Pitsawat	2006	Yes		Yes	Chai	
The Legend of King Naresuan	2007	Yes			King Maha Chakkraphat	
Salad Ta Diow Gub Dek 200 Ta	2008	Yes			Captain Rith	
Ong Bak 2	2008	Yes			Lord Jom Rajasena	
The Manitou Vanquisher	2009	Yes			Wa-yib	
Ong Bak 3	2010	Yes			Lord Jom Rajasena	
Kon Khon	2011		Yes	Yes		
Tootsies & the Fake	2019	Yes			Win's Father	(final film role)

=== Stage ===
Production	Year	Theatre	Role / Credited as	Ref(s)
Soo Fun An Ying Yai (Man of La Mancha)	1987	The National Theatre	Miguel de Cervantes / Don Quixote	
Rai San Sook	1987	The National Theatre		
Pan Tai Norasing	1989	Chalermthai Theatre	Pan Tai Norasing	
Prat Ya She Wit (The Prophet)		Sang Aroon Art and Cultural Center	Almustafa	
Sunya Luerd Sunya Rak (Dial M For Murder)	1991	A.U.A. Theatre		
Cinderella	1991	The National Theatre	Prince Philip	
Tuen Tuek	1992	A.U.A. Theatre	Mongkol / Mong	
Talui Muang Tukkata	1992	The National Theatre		
Jing Jog Lork Lai (Little Foxes)	1992	A.U.A. Theatre		
Talui Muang Tukkata	1993	The National Theatre		
Tootsie	1993	A.U.A. Theatre	Michael Dorsey / Dorothy Michaels	
Tootsie	1993	Bangkok Theatre	Michael Dorsey / Dorothy Michaels	
Hamlet	1995	Thailand Cultural Centre		
Amadeus	1996	Bangkok Theatre		
Nang Paya Ngoo Kao (Legend of the White Snake)	1999	Bangkok Theatre	Fahai	
ART	2000	Bangkok Theatre		
Black Comedy : Ruang Lub Lub Ton Dub Fai	2004	Bangkok Theatre		
Wiwa Cabaret	2006	Bangkok Metropolis Theatre		
Fah Jarod Sai The Musical	2007	Rachadalai Theatre	King Ahmed	
Tuen Tuek 2 40 Pee Pan Kan Perng Ka Yub	2008	M Theatre		
Langkha Daeng The Musical	2012	Bangkok Theatre	Producer, Screenwriter & Director	
Paen Din Kong Rao	2015	Rachadalai Theatre		

== Discography ==
Solo Album

- 1992 Krang Neung (Once)
- 1995 Hua Jai Look Thoong

Compilation Album

- 1995 Mon Rak Look Thoong Original Soundtrack Vol.1 & Vol.2
- 2001 Nai Hoy Tamil Original Soundtrack Vol.1 & Vol.2

== Awards ==
Mekhala Awards

Year	Nominated work	Category	Result	Ref
1994	Tawipop	Best Actor in A Leading Role	Won	

Golden Television Awards

Year	Nominated work	Category	Result	Ref
1994	Kuen Wan Artit (Sunday Night)	Outstanding Male Host for A General Program	Won	
