= Kessarin Ektawatkul =

Thai actress and taekwondo practitioner

- เกศริน เอกธวัชกุล
- Born: 31 August 1981 (age 45); Thailand
- Other name: Nui (นุ้ย)
- Education: Kasetsart University
- Occupation: Actress

Kessarin Ektawatkul (Thai: เกศริน เอกธวัชกุล, RTGS: Ketsarin Ekthawatkun), nicknamed Nui (นุ้ย), is a Thai film actress and singer.

== Life and career ==
A former national champion in taekwondo, she has been featured in several martial arts films, including Born to Fight (2004), Dangerous Flowers (Chai Lai Angels) (2006), Somtum (Muay Thai Giant) (2008), Final Target (Vanquisher) (2009) and Vengeance of an Assassin (2014).

== Discography ==
- เบื่อ - Silly Fools
- ไม่โกรธแต่ไม่ลืม
- Up 2 U (Feat.ฮาเวิร์ด หวัง) playlist on YouTube
- Baby I'm ร้อน
- อะระมากะดู (Aramagadu)

== Accolades ==
=== Listicle ===
- 2011: Kessarin Ektawatkul was ranked 6th in FHM's 100 Sexiest Women in Thailand 2011.
