= Dynamite Warrior =

- Thai theatrical poster
- Directed by: Chalerm Wongpim
- Produced by: Prachya Pinkaew
- Starring: Dan Chupong; Panna Rittikrai
- Distributed by: Sahamongkol Film International; Magnolia Pictures
- Release date: December 21, 2006
- Country: Thailand
- Language: Thai

Dynamite Warrior (Thai: ฅนไฟบิน (modern: คนไฟบิน), translit. Khon Fai Bin) is a 2006 Thai martial arts Western Comedy-Drama film directed by Chalerm Wongpim and starring Dan Chupong (from Born to Fight).

== Plot ==
The story is set in 1890s Siam. Siang is a young Muay Thai warrior and rocketry expert, raised in a Buddhist temple, who steals back water buffalo taken from poor Isan farmers by unscrupulous cattle raiders. He is searching for a man with a tattoo in the chest who killed his parents.

A local nobleman, Lord Waeng, wants to create a market for his steam tractors, so he hires a hulking convict and the Thief to burn the farmhouses together with black wizard, kill all the cattle traders, take the farmers as hostages at an outside near the farmhouse and round up all the water buffalo for slaughter, depriving farmers of the draft animals they need to cultivate rice. Lord Waeng's men are eventually pitted against Nai Hoi Singh, a cattle trader with supernatural powers and a tattoo on his chest. The tattoo gets Siang's attention, and while the Thief is attempting to steal Sing's cattle herd, Siang briefly confronts Sing but is repelled.

Lord Waeng consults the wizard Nai Hoi Dam, a former partner of Sing who was once cursed by him so that he cannot withstand sunlight for just a moment before the wizard Dam angrily to find a way to defeat Sing, returning to block the power that released Sing's curse. Dam says the only way to nullify his spells is to use the menstrual blood of a virgin – the black wizard's daughter, E'Sao. They enlist the help of Siang, with Waeng pretending to be a fellow orphan by Singh's hand, and all together manage to submit Singh in an ambush. However, Dam reveals that he was in fact the man that murdered Siang's parents, and that the tattoo was a mark of sorcery both of them have. Siang and a disabled Singh manage to flee.

In Waeng's palace, Dam also reveals that E'Sao is not his daughter, but a baby he kidnapped, and intends to rape her so Singh remains magically disabled for good. Waeng poisons him, but Dam transfers his consciousness to Waeng's own body. Siang assaults the place, beating the Thief, but he is unable to defeat Dam, and it is not until Singh recovers his powers and gives Siang amulets extracted from his chest that the battle becomes even. The weakened Singh dies in a magical duel against Dam, but Siang defeats the black wizard, who is obstructed by Waeng's lingering mind. At the end, Siang and E'Sao use rockets to fire Dam against Waeng's tractor, exploding and killing both villains at once. The couple leaves on a buffalo into the sunset.

== Cast ==
- Dan Chupong as Siang
- Phutiphong Sriwat as Lord Waeng
- Somdet Kaewleu as the Thief
- Samart Payakaroon as Nai Hoi Singh
- Panna Ritikrai as Nai Hoi Dam
- Kanyaphak Suwankut as E'Sao.

== Production ==
The film's working title was Tabunfire, but was renamed Khon Fai Bin by Sahamongkol Film International chief executive Somsak Techaratanaprasert who wanted the film's name to be similar to the Thai title for Chen Kaige's The Promise, which was Khon Ma Bin (literally "flying horseman"). Khon fai bin means "flying man of fire". Khon is also spelled with the obsolete character ฅ, presumably still in use at the time of the action, but since replaced by ค.

The English title underwent a change as well, to Dynamite Warrior, as the film was sold to Magnolia Pictures, an American distributor.

In Thailand, the English title has been listed as Fire Warriors.

The film was made with an all-Isan cast and crew, filming for several months in a small village in Phu Wiang District, Khon Kaen Province. "With over a hundred buffalo in the village, it provided the perfect backdrop for the movie," star Dan Chupong said in an interview.

== See also ==
- Rocket Festival
