= Vengeance of an Assassin =

- Film poster
- เร็วทะลุเร็ว
- Directed by: Panna Rittikrai
- Written by: Panna Rittikrai; Wichit Wattananon
- Produced by: Somsak Techaratanaprasert
- Starring: Dan Chupong; Nantawooti Boonrapsap
- Cinematography: Nattawut Kittikhun
- Edited by: Saravuth Nakajad
- Music by: Kanisorn Phuangjeen
- Production company: Sahamongkol Film International
- Release date: 13 November 2014 (Thailand)
- Running time: 90 minutes
- Country: Thailand
- Language: Thai

Vengeance of an Assassin (Thai: เร็วทะลุเร็ว) is a 2014 Thai martial arts film directed by Panna Rittikrai and released by Sahamongkol Film International. It reunited Rittikrai and Chupong, the director and star of the 2004 film Born to Fight. It is the final film directed by Panna Rittikrai, who died at the age of 53 on Sunday, July 20, 2014, and features many of his trademark elaborate stunts and lengthy single-take action sequences.

== Plot ==
Thee (Dan Chupong) and his brother Than (Nantawooti Boonrapsap) are two young men being raised by their uncle (Ping Lumprapleng) who runs a car repair shop. They are curious about a room their uncle always keeps closed and will not let them enter so one evening they get him drunk and sneak into the room, where they find evidence that their parents also used to be undercover detectives and were killed in an ambush by an unknown attacker. Their uncle, who was also a detective at the time, promised their parents that he would take the brothers raise them as normal children and protect them from their parents' and his old life and profession as detectives. After learning this Thee resolves to set out to find out who killed their parents while Than remains to work in their uncle's car repair shop, training himself in martial arts by watching VHS cassettes in the back of the shop.

Thee joins a team of killers with the intent of working his way to the top to the person who gave the order to kill the brothers' parents. He learns the Assassin's Code: Stick to the mission; Never take your eyes off the target; Show no mercy. For one job he is hired to protect Ploy (Nisachon Tuamsongnern), a young woman with dyed blonde hair who is the granddaughter of a powerful businessman. Thee is unaware that Ploy is actually the target of the assassination and Thee has been set up to take the fall for her murder but when he is double-crossed during the mission he rescues her and fights off their attackers. He takes her on the run back to his family's home, uncovering a secret network of power and corruption and making him and his remaining family a target. His uncle is killed by assassins and the brothers weep over their loss then resolve to fight back with the aid of Ploy and her Chinese doctor Si Fu (Ooi Teik Huat).

== Cast ==
- Dan Chupong as Thee
- Nantawooti Boonrapsap as Than
- Kessarin Ektawatkul as Joy
- Chatchapol Kulsiriwuthichai as Pod
- Kowit Wattanakul as Chai
- Kazu Patrick Tang
- Ping Lumprapleng
- Nisachon Tuamsongnern as Ploy
- Ooi Teik Huat as Si Fu

== Reception ==
Critics praised the action sequences but found the use of CGI elements to be a downside. Matthew Hartman of High-Def Digest wrote that "where things get a bit ugly is during some unfortunate CGI enhanced scenes. These scenes I imagine weren't overseen by Rittikrai as they look hurried, and just outright unsightly compared to the rest of the film. In all honesty if it weren't for those scenes later in the film, this would be a perfect score. But considering how ugly they are, they're made that much worse with this stunning picture."

== Home video ==
The film was released on DVD and Blu-ray by Well Go USA on April 14, 2015, and is available for streaming from Netflix and Amazon Video.
