= Bangkok Knockout =

2010 film by Panna Rittikrai

- Film poster
- Directed by: Panna Rittikrai
- Screenplay by: Jonathon Siminoe; Dojit Hongthong
- Story by: Panna Rittikrai
- Produced by: Panna Rittikrai; Prachya Pinkaew; Akarapol Techaratanaprasert; Nonthakorn Thaweesuk
- Starring: Chatchapol Kulsiriwuthichai Pimchanok Luevisadpaibul; Gitabak Agohjit; Supaksorn Chaimongkol; Sorapong Chatree
- Cinematography: Pipat Pyakha; Nonthakorn Thaweesuk
- Edited by: Saravuth Nakajad; Nonthakorn Thaweesuk
- Music by: Terdsak Janpan
- Production company: Na Film
- Distributed by: Sahamongkol Film International; Magnolia Pictures (US)
- Release date: December 16, 2010
- Running time: 106 minutes
- Country: Thailand
- Languages: Thai; English

Bangkok Knockout (Thai: โคตรสู้ โคตรโส) is a 2010 Thai martial arts film directed by Panna Rittikrai and written by Jonathon Siminoe. The film stars Chatchapol Kulsiriwuthichai, Pimchanok Luevisadpaibul, Gitabak Agohjit, Supaksorn Chaimongkol, Sorapong Chatree, Virat Kemgrad, Speedy Arnold and Sarawoot Kumsorn.

== Premise ==
After winning a contest to star in a Hollywood film, a group of martial arts students celebrate by hosting a party, but they all get drugged and passed out while celebrating. When they wake up, they are attacked and soon some of their friends have been kidnapped. They quickly learn that a group of assassins are after them and that the contest may not have been what it seemed. The only way to survive is to fight their way out and rescue their friends.

== Cast ==
- Chatchapol Kulsiriwuthichai as Pod (Martial Arts of Taekwondo)
- Pimchanok Luevisadpaibul as Bai-Fern
- Speedy Arnod as Mr Snead
- Gitabak Agohjit as Git (Martial Arts of Gymnastics)
- Supaksorn Chaimongkol as Joy
- Sorapong Chatree as Sergeant Ram Former Border Patrol Police
- Virat Kemgrad as Jao
- Sarawoot Kumsorn as U-Go (Martial Arts of Muay Thai)
- Krittiya Lardphanna as Kuk Yai
- Sumret Muengput as Ao (Martial Arts of Commando Sambo)
- Deka Partum as Jame
- Panna Rittikrai as Suthep Sisai
- Puchong Sartnork as Eddo (Martial Arts of Freerunning)
- Poonyapat Soonkunchanon as Lerm (Martial Arts of Tai chi)
- Tanavit Wongsuwan as Pom (Martial Arts of Kung Fu)
- Vinai Weangyanogoong as Black Men
- Kiattisak Udomnak

== Production ==
Magnolia Pictures has gained the U.S. distributional rights.

== Reception ==
The film received mixed to positive reviews from critics.
