= Vanquisher (film) =

Vanquisher (Final Target)
- Directed by: Manop Udomdej
- Written by: Manop Udomdej
- Starring: Sophita Sriban; Kessarin Ektawatkul; Pete Thongchua; Sarunyoo Wongkrachang
- Distributed by: Sahamongkol Film
- Release date: 2009
- Running time: 90 minutes
- Country: Thailand
- Language: Thai

Vanquisher (aka Final Target; Thai: สวยซามูไร, Suay Samurai (Beautiful Samurai)) is a 2009 Thai science fiction/action film. It was directed by Manop Udomdej and starred Sophita Sriban. The film was released on November 5, 2009.

== Plot ==
Kunja, a beautiful agent of the CIA SAD, has just completed an Undercover operation in southern Thailand. Then she finds herself the target of an assassination attempt undertaken by her own organization. the CIA agent Gunja is forced to fight against agents who have been ordered to take her out at all costs. She survives and, after two years of staying low, reappears in Bangkok to confront her old enemies and thwart a plot to detonate a bomb in the city. She manages to survive and decides to take revenge.

== Cast ==
- Sophita Sriban (Thai: โสภิตา ศรีบาลชื่น) as Kunja
- Nui Ketsarin as Sirin
- Jackie Apithananon as Claire
- Pete Thongchua as Mazaru
- Sarunyoo Wongkrachang as Wayib

Originally, the film featured four Thai femme fatales, but executive producer Somsak Techaratanaprasert ordered all scenes with “Amy” Chotiros Suriyawong scrubbed from the film after she had sparked condemnation by wearing a scandalously revealing dress during the 2007 Thailand National Film Association Awards.

== Reception ==
The film has drawn sharp criticism.
