= Biw Jitchareeya =

- บิว จิตรฉรีญา
- Born: Jitchareeya Boontam; 11 November 1997 (age 27); Ubon Ratchathani Province, Thailand
- Occupation: Singer
- Musical career
- Genres: Luk thung; Mor lam sing; T-Pop
- Years active: 2019–present
- Labels: Prathom Entertainment

Biw Jitchareeya (birth name: Jitchareeya Boontam; Thai: บิว จิตรฉรีญา; born November 11, 1997) is a Thai luk thung and morlam singer from Isan. She has been a member of the mor lam band Prathom Banthengsilp since 2022.

== Early life and career ==
Jitchareeya was born in Ubon Ratchathani Province. She began singing at an early age as a morlam artist. She is also known by her nickname Biw and the epithet Sao Sieng Haw (Thai: สาวเสียงห้าว, meaning "gruff-voiced girl"). In 2022, she joined the band Prathom Banthengsilp, releasing her debut single Jitchareeya Pray From Fans (จิตรฉรีญาวอนแฟน).

She gained recognition with her second single, Our Past Love at Phu Yod Ruai (Thai: ฮอยกอดภูยอดรวย, lit. "Hoi Kod Phu Yod Ruai"), released in 2023 and written by Big Phumarin. The song went viral on TikTok in Thailand, using the hashtag "#เยิ้นเยอะเยิ้นเยอะเยิ้นเยิ้น". Her success led to a collaboration with Jintara Poonlarp on the single Await You at Rai Rua Fai (Thai: คอยอ้ายไหลเรือไฟ, lit. "Koi Ai Lai Rua Fai").

== Discography ==
=== Singles ===
Year	Title	Label	Composer / Lyricist	Arranger / Instrument
2023	"Jitcahreeya Pray from Fans" (จิตรฉรีญาวอนแฟน)	Independence	Big Phumarin	N/A
2023	"Our Past Love at Phu Yod Ruai" (ฮอยกอดภูยอดรวย)	Prathom Entertainment	Big Phumarin	Bounlong Mongkolphon
2023	"Lam Phaen from My Heart" (ลำแพนแทนใจ)	Prathom Entertainment	Big Phumarin	Bounlong Mongkolphon
2023	"Sweet Love at Bueng Kaen Nakhon" (รักซึ้งบึงแก่นนคร)	Prathom Entertainment	Santi Simsen	Jinny Phuthai
2023	"Await You at Rai Rua Fai" (คอยอ้ายไหลเรือไฟ) (with Jintara Poonlarp)	Cat9 Studio	Big Phumarin	Bounlong Mongkolphon
