= Rak Salai Dok Fai Ban =

Single by Jintara Poonlarp

from the album Mor lam sa on 1
- Language: Thai; Isan
- Released: November 1998
- Genre: Luk thung; Mor lam
- Length: 4:01
- Label: Master Tape (GMM Grammy)
- Songwriter: Dao Bandon
- Producer: Sawat Sarakham

Music videos
- "Rak Salai Dokfai Ban" on YouTube

Rak Salai Dokfai Ban (Thai: รักสลายดอกฝ้ายบาน), is a song by Thai Mor lam singer Jintara Poonlarp, released in November 1998 by Master Tape (GMM Grammy). Written by Dao Bandon and produced by Sawat Sarakham, the track appears on the album Mor lam sa on 1.

This song is symbol of Red Cross's festival of Loei Province, and was covered by Darunee Sutthiphithak in 2017.
