= Handle Me with Care =

Handle Me With Care
- Thai theatrical poster
- Directed by: Kongdej Jaturanrasamee
- Written by: Kongdej Jaturanrasamee
- Produced by: Jira Maligool; Yongyoot Thongkongtoon; Cherchonnee Soonthornsaratul; Chanajai Thongsaithong
- Starring: Supakson Chaimongkol; Kiatkamol Lata
- Cinematography: Naruphol Chokanapitak
- Edited by: Patamanada Yukol
- Music by: Hualampong Riddim
- Distributed by: GMM Tai Hub
- Release date: 21 February 2008
- Running time: 119 minutes
- Country: Thailand
- Language: Thai

Handle Me With Care (Thai: กอด, Kod, literally "Hug"), also known as 三手仔手記 (Hong Kong title) or 一路上有手 (Taiwanese title), is a 2008 Thai romantic drama film directed by Kongdej Jaturanrasamee.

== Plot summary ==
The story is about a three-armed man on a journey from Lampang to Bangkok who meets a young woman and the two experience various misadventures and grow closer together.

== Cast ==
- Supakson Chaimongkol as Na
- Kiatkamol Lata as Kwan

== Release and reception ==
Handle Me With Care opened in Thailand cinemas on February 21, 2008. It was No. 4 at the box office on opening weekend, behind the newly released Hollywood film, Jumper, the three-week-old Thai martial arts film, Chocolate and a Thai comedy, Valentine, which had been released the week before. It remained in fourth place the following week but then dropped to No. 19 in its third weekend.

Local critical response was mixed. Bangkok Post film critic Kong Rithdee called the film "wearisome", and said that though the film has "nice moments ... the script is too shipshape, maybe too busy with its thematic messages, and it's not easy to sympathise with Kwan, who obviously has never heard of worse handicaps. Writer-director Kongdej Jaturanrasamee is a better director when he allows his films to be wackier.".

ThaiCinema.org's reviewers praised the performance by actress Supaksorn Chaimongkol, as well as the intricate "hand talent" effects – Kwan's third hand was played by an actual actor, rather than special effects. But the reviewers said the film contained too many elements and tended to be draggy in places.

The film was screened at the 2008 Hong Kong International Film Festival, where it was reviewed by Maggie Lee of The Hollywood Reporter, who echoed the criticisms that the film had too many elements. "Director Kongdej Jaturanrasamee is in two minds about turning his script into Jim Carrey-like slapstick, a candy floss romance with a dash of magical fantasy, or an offbeat road movie. He handles none of these generic variations with enough care, leaving each dangling like an unwanted arm."

Russell Edwards of Variety also said the problem was the script, which "like many comedies with a sentimental streak, gets lost in mawkishness ... the idiosyncratic "Handle" becomes too slow and self-pitying".

The film also played at the 2008 Far East Film Festival in Udine, Italy and in June 2008 at the Filmfest München in Munich, Germany.

=== Festivals ===
Handle Me With Care has been shown at film festivals as follows:

- 32nd Hong Kong International Film Festival 2008, Hong Kong (17 March-6 April 2008)
- 10th Udine Far East Film Festival 2008, Udine, Italy (18–26 April 2008)
- 26th Filmfest Munchen, Munich Film Festival 2008, Germany (20–28 June 2008)
- Montreal Fantasia Festival 2008, Canada (3–21 July 2008)
- 2nd Chungmuro International Film Festival 2008, Korea (3–11 September 2008)
- Bangkok International Film Festival 2008, Thailand (23–30 September 2008)
- 2008 Taipei Golden Horse Film Festival, Taiwan (6–21 November 2008)
- Osaka Asian Film Festival 2009, Osaka, Japan (13–16 March 2009)
- Silk Screen Asian American Film Festival 2009, Pittsburgh, PA, USA (8–17 May 2009)
