= Somtum (film) =

Somtum (Muay Thai Giant)
- Directed by: Nonthakorn Thaveesuk
- Story by: Panna Rittikrai
- Starring: Nathan Jones; Sasisa Jindamanee; Nawarat Techarathanaprasert
- Distributed by: Sahamongkol Film International
- Release date: 5 June 2008
- Running time: 101 minutes
- Country: Thailand
- Languages: Thai; English

Somtum (Thai: ส้มตำ), also released under the American title Muay Thai Giant, is a 2008 Thai martial arts film starring Nathan Jones as a tourist in Pattaya who is drugged, robbed and left penniless. Befriended by two young girls, one of whom is a muay Thai kickboxing champion, he is taken to their family restaurant where he is fed some spicy som tam. His adverse reaction leads to the destruction of the restaurant and he vows to raise the money to rebuild it.

== Cast ==
- Nathan Jones as Barney Emerald
- Sasisa Jindamanee as Dokya
- Nawarat Techarathanaprasert as Katen
- Dan Chupong as Lieutenant Pong
- Kessarin Ektawatkul as Papaya Vendor
- Conan Stevens as Jojo
- Philip Hersh as Sports Announcer (Voice)
- Chatchapol Kulsiriwutichai as Passport Fraud Gang
- Sarawut Komsorn as Passport Fraud Gang
- Tanavit Wongsuwan as Passport Fraud Gang
