= Ong Bak 3 =

Ong-Bak 3
- Thai poster
- Directed by: Tony Jaa; Panna Rittikrai
- Written by: Tony Jaa; Panna Rittikrai
- Produced by: Tony Jaa; Panna Rittikrai; Akarapol Techaratanaprasert
- Starring: Tony Jaa; Dan Chupong
- Cinematography: Nuttawut Kittikun
- Edited by: Saravut Nakajud; Nuttawut Kittikun
- Music by: Terdsak Janpan
- Distributed by: Sahamongkol Film International
- Release date: May 5, 2010
- Running time: 95 minutes
- Country: Thailand
- Language: Thai

Ong-Bak 3 (Thai: องค์บาก 3) is a 2010 Thai martial arts film directed, produced and written by Tony Jaa and Panna Rittikrai. The film is a sequel to Ong Bak 2 (2008) and revolves around Tien (Tony Jaa), who escapes after being captured by the Lord Rajasena (Sarunyu Wongkrajang) and recovers from his crippling injuries with the help of Master Bua (Nirut Sirijanya), where he returns to confront Bhuti Sangkha (Dan Chupong), who has replaced Rajasena as the king.

== Plot ==
After the events of the previous film, Tien is held captive by Lord Rajasena. He momentarily fights back when they try to beat him with wooden staves, but they manage to submit him, and Rajasena orders Tien's elbows and knees to be snapped. Meanwhile, the village of Kana Khone is overwhelmed by a mysterious curse. In order to find a solution, Master Bua initiates a Buddhist pilgrimage, in which he finds out the source of the curse is Bhuti Sangkha, the dark mystic who defeated Tien. Bua becomes a monk to better ward off evil.

Lord Rajasena is tormented by visions of a nobleman who died cursing him after Rajasena poisoned him to seize his realm. Meanwhile, the remnants of the Pha Beek Khrut bandits attempt to free Tien, but Bhuti kills them. Lord Rajasena offers to hire him, but Bhuti declines and instead proposes to remove Rajasena's curse, hinting Tien is related to it, before leaving. Rajasena orders his men to execute Tien next day, but a messenger from the Ayutthaya Kingdom, the highest authority on the land, arrives with a pardon for Tien and takes him away to Kana Khone to be healed. The lord's ministers send assassins to kill Tien, but the attempt is thwarted by the sacrifice of the royal messengers.

The returning Master Bua announces that Tien suffered his fate due to negative karma, and he enlists the entire village to make merits to heal him back to life. The process, which includes the making of the Ong Bak Buddha, is successful, but upon waking up, Tien is devastated to discover he is still crippled from the beatings. He prepares to take his life by night, but Master Bua stops him and teaches him that, like daybreak, light is always nearby wherever shadows fall, which gives Tien back his will to live. Tien drags to a temple and practices meditation and self-taught physical therapy. Finally healed, he is visited by Pim, whom he ritually dances with before embracing. Master Bua teaches him about Dharma and bids him to change his enemies into dance partners, and Tien develops a new fighting style by combining martial arts and dance.

Rajasena visits Bhuti's ruined castle to remove his curse, but Bhuti reveals the curse to be his work all along, done to usurp Rajasena as the new king. After a battle against his soldiers, Bhuti kills Rajasena, but the latter curses Bhuti in turn. Bhuti sends soldiers to kill Tien, but the latter defeats them, albeit only to find the village in ruins and the surviving villagers kidnapped. The usurper has enslaved them in his palace, where he is having elephants killed to drink their blood. Tien then visits Master Bua, who tells him he has been chosen to drive off ignorance, and then resolves to go to Bhuti's palace to stop him.

Confronted by Tien, Bhuti boasts that he feeds on Tien's negative emotions. He uses his power to summon an eclipse and kills Pim. This makes Tien give in to anger and fight through the guards with feral violence, but Bhuti ultimately defeats him by throwing a spear through his chest. As he falls dying, Tien remembers Bua's teachings, and the entire battle and Pim's death are revealed to be all an illusion. Now in a higher state of mind, Tien shatters Bhuti's powers and dispels the eclipse. Tien overcomes Bhuti in a fight, and this time Tien catches the spear with his hands pressed together. At the end, Tien holds Bhuti aloft by his chin and drops him off the royal ledge over a furious elephant, whose tusk breaks and mortally impales Bhuti. With good having triumphed over evil, the elephant, now resembling the one-tusk Ganesha, raises his head in a victorious trumpet.

Beginning life anew, the final scene shows Tien, Pim and the remaining villagers bowing before the Ong Bak.

== Cast ==
- Tony Jaa as Tien
- Primorata Dejudom as Pim
- Chupong Chungpruk as Bhuti Sangkha / Crow Ghost
- Sarunyoo Wongkrachang as Lord Rajasena
- Nirut Sirijanya as Master Phra Bua
- Petchtai Wongkamlao as Mhen (as Phetthai Wongkhamlao)
- Chumphorn Thepphithak as Uncle Mao
- Supakorn Kitsuwon as Golden-Armoured King's Guard
- Sorapong Chatree as Chernang
- Santisuk Promsiri as Lord Sihadecho

== Production ==
After the first two weeks of Ong Bak 2 theatrical release, the president of Sahamongkol Film announced their intention of a sequel. Filming of new footage for the follow-up was to begin before the end of the year and was to incorporate unused footage from Ong Bak 2.

== Release ==
Ong Bak 3 was released in Thailand on May 5, 2010. On its first week it played in 135 theaters in Thailand and was the second highest grossing film in the Thai box office, earning $555,823. Ong Bak 3 earned $1,335,646 during its theatrical run in Thailand and grossed a total of $2,325,473 with foreign markets. This was less successful than Ong Bak 2, which had made $8,936,663 in total. Ong Bak 3 had its North American premiere at Fantastic Fest on September 23, 2010. The film was released on DVD and Blu-ray in Australia on November 8, 2010, and in the United States on February 8, 2011.

== Reception ==
Both Empire and Film Business Asia praised the action scenes but pointed out the weak story. Film Business Asia gave the film a five out of ten rating praising the action sequences but finding that it made Ong Bak 2 "look like a masterpiece of character development". Variety and Total Film found the film spent too much focus on Buddhist philosophy that left not enough time for the action scenes. Total Film awarded the film two stars out of five, stating that "a greater focus on Buddhist philosophy...leaves little room for the sort of bone-crunching, no-frills set-pieces that first brought Jaa to our attention". Slant Magazine gave the film three stars out of four praising it as "easily the most brutal of all the contemporary Thai martial arts films that have come to the U.S. thus far. But that's what characterizes the Thai style of fighting films: inspired excess and decadence".

== Video game ==
Ong Bak Tri, a video game based on Ong Bak films, was in development by Studio Hive and was to be published worldwide by Immanitas Entertainment for PC, smartphones, PlayStation Network, and Xbox Live Marketplace. The game was intended to be 2.5D side-scrolling brawler with "intense fighting action, impressive free-running sequences, and highly cinematic quick-time action events", according to the press release. The game, like the second and third films, was to be set in ancient Thailand. No official release date has been announced and the project was presumably canceled.
