= Dokaor Toongtong =

Thai female singer

Dokaor Toongtong ดอกอ้อ ทุ่งทอง
- Born: Buppha Boonmee (Thai: บุปผา บุญมี); 23 September 1977 (age 48); Buntharik district, Ubon Ratchathani Province, Thailand
- Genres: Mor lam
- Occupation: Singer • Actress
- Instrument: Voice
- Years active: 2003–present
- Labels: Grammy Gold, GMM Music

Dokaor Toongtong (Thai: ดอกอ้อ ทุ่งทอง) is a Thai luk thung and mor lam sing singer from the Isan area. Her most popular songs include Ber Tho Jao Choo, Oak Hak Wan Hae Tiean, Miea Kao and Rak Phay Thee Kaeng Saphue.

She is also sometimes known by her nickname Aor or the epithet Sao Sieng Sor (สาวเสียงซอ).

== Early life ==
She was born on 23 September 1977 in the village of Non Klor, Tambon NonKlor, Amphoe Buntarik, in Ubon Ratchathani Province to Samran and Sanga Boonmee, and was named Buppha Boonmee by birth.

== Music career ==
Toongtong has a contract with the GMM Grammy record label and debuted in 2003 with her first studio album, Oak Hak Wan Hae Tiean (อกหักวันแห่เทียน). Her second album, Ber Tho Jao Choo (เบอร์โทรเจ้าชู้), was written by Sala Khunnawut and released in 2006.

In 2018, she recorded a single named Rak Phai Thee Kaeng Saphue (รักพ่ายที่แก่งสะพือ), which was written by Dao Bandon.

== Personal life ==
She has a younger sister named Kantong Thoongnugen, who is also a mor lam sing singer.

== Studio albums ==
#	Album
1st	อกหักวันแห่เทียน (Ok Huk Wun Hae Tian): Released: 27 May 2003; Label: GMM Grammy
2nd	เบอร์โทรเจ้าชู้ (Bur Tho Jao Choo): Released: 17 January 2006; Label: GMM Grammy

=== Single ===
- Rien Korn Mae Sorn Wai (Original : Siriporn Ampaipong) (2007)
- Yarn Ai Bau Jai (Original : Tai Jiraporn) (2007)
- Ber Tho Kee Tua (with Karntong Toongngern) (Cover Version) (Original : Siriporn Ampaipong) (2015)
- Kerng Jai (Cover Version) (Original : Kantong Tungngern) (2018)
- Fak Berng Nae Der (Cover Version) (Original : Earnkwan Waranya) (2018)
- Bud Sa Lob Yah Job Kae Pob Naa (Original : Tai Orathai) (2019)
- Pai Huk Gun Sa (Cover Version) (Original : Phai Phongsathon) (2019)
- Poo Ying Lhai Mue (Cover Version) (Original : Siriporn Ampaipong) (2020)

=== Collaborations ===
- 2009 – Kued Nam Kao Hed Yang (with Sorn Sinchai)
- 2020 – Ta Wen Tok Don (with Boy Panomprai)

== Special albums ==
#	Album
1st	คู่ฮักคู่อ้อน ชุด หนุ่มบ้านเฮา สาวโรงงาน (Koo Huk Koo On Vol. Nhum Ban How Sow Rong Ngarn): Released: 20 March 2007; Label: GMM Grammy
2nd	คู่ฮักคู่อ้อน ชุด พอปานกัน (Koo Huk Koo On Vol. Por Parn Gun): Released: 31 March 2011; Label: GMM Grammy
3rd	เอื้อย-น้อง-ร้องลำ (Euei Nong Rong Lam): Released: 15 March 2012; Label: GMM Grammy
4th	มัน ม่วน แซบ (Mun Muan Saab): Released: 14 March 2013; Label: GMM Grammy
5th	มัน ม่วน แซบ 2 (Mun Muan Saab 2): Released: 25 Sebtember 2014; Label: GMM Grammy
6th	มัน ม่วน แซบ 3 (Mun Muan Saab 3): Released: 11 December 2015; Label: GMM Grammy

== Filmography ==
=== TV Series ===
Year	Title	Role	TV Network
2015	Mad Ded Siang Thong (หมัดเด็ดเสียงทอง)	Aor (อ้อ)	GMM 25
2019	Sao Noy Roy Lan View (สาวน้อยร้อยล้านวิว)	Dokaor Toongtong (Invited) ดอกอ้อ ทุ่งทอง (รับเชิญ)	One 31
2022	Ai Koi Hug Jao (อ้ายข่อยฮักเจ้า)	Mother Sorn Nongnakam แม่ศร หนองนาคำ	Channel 3
2022	Sin Lai So (ซิ่นลายโส้)	Roongaroon Kemngarm (roong) / Nangmai รุ่งอรุณ เข็มงาม (รุ่ง) / นางไหม	One 31
2023	Kao Nhiaw Thong Kam (ข้าวเหนียวทองคำ)	Duak Koon (ดอกคูณ)	One 31
	Ruk Koon Tow Chang (รักคุณเท่าช้าง)		One 31
