= Jintara Poonlarp =

Thai singer (born 1969)

- จินตหรา พูนลาภ
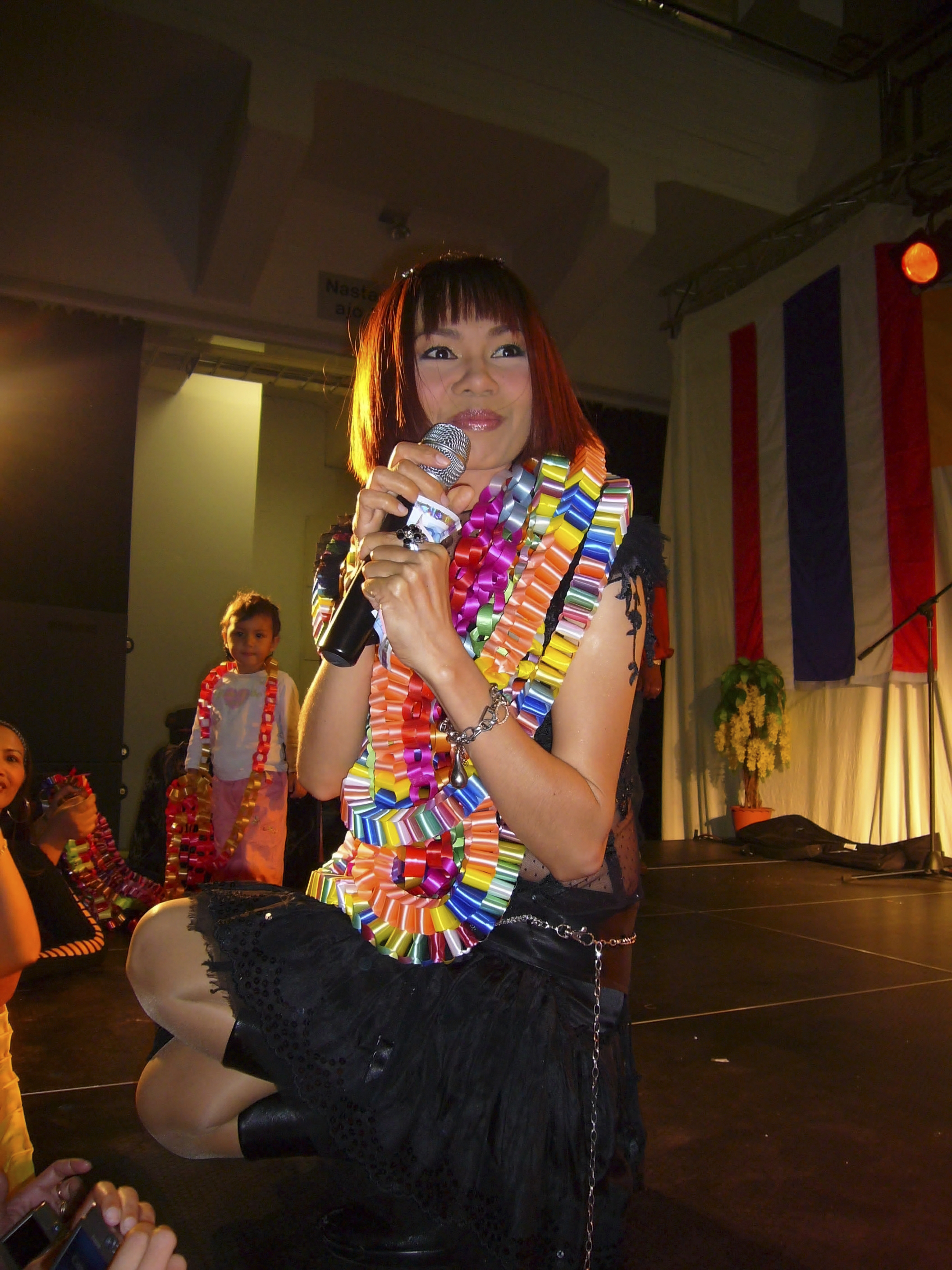
- Jintara Poonlarp in 2007
- Born: Tongbai Janlueang (Thai: ทองใบ จันทร์เหลือง); 6 March 1969 (age 57); Roi Et province, Thailand
- Occupation: Singer • Actress
- Notable work: Rak Salai Dokfai Ban (1998); Tao Ngoi (2018); Nam Ta Yoei Pok (2019); Pha Mai Ai Lueam (2019)
- Spouse: Kobkitti Kaweesuntornkul
- Mother: Jan Janlueang
- Musical career
- Genres: Luk thung; Mor lam
- Instrument: Vocal
- Years active: 1987–present
- Label: GMM Grammy • Master Tape • R-siam • Cat 9 Studio

Signature
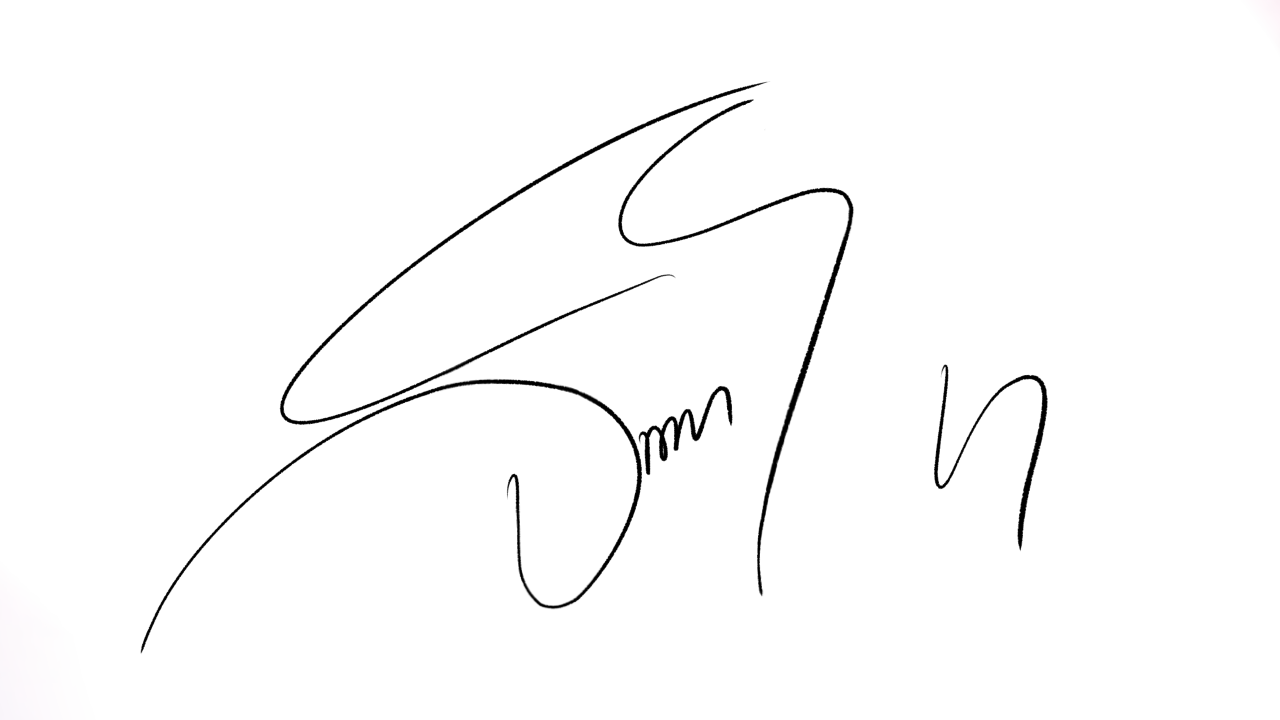

Jintara Poonlarp (Thai: จินตหรา พูนลาภ, RTGS: Chintara Phunlap, pronounced [t͡ɕīn.tā.rǎː pʰūːn.lâːp]; b. 6 March 1969, Kaset Wisai district, Roi Et province, Thailand) is a Thai mor lam, luk thung and pop music singer.

She is one of the most popular and prolific of the artists in the mor lam (Thai country) and luk thung (Thai pop-country) genres, having released 50 original albums and 47 singles as well as many compilations. She records roughly equal amounts of mor lam and luk thung, but two of her best-known songs are the string (Thai pop) hits "Ma Tammai" and "Faen Ja," recorded with Thongchai McIntyre.

She is also sometimes known by her nickname Jin or the epithet sao siang pin (Thai: สาวเสียงพิณ, meaning "lute-voiced girl"), and she has a unique identity which is short hair with bangs. She has performed on stage for 33 years.

== Early life and childhood ==
Born in Thailand's Isan region, Jintara's birth name was Tongbai Janlueang but this changed to Tongbai Poonlarp when her parents registered their marriage. Jintara is her stage name. Although Friday 12 March 1971 is commonly given as her birth date she celebrates her birthday on 6 March and this is the date of birth on her ID card. On her Facebook page the year she was born is given as 1969. Her mother could not remember the exact date she was born, not uncommon in rural Thailand in previous decades.

== Career ==
=== Music ===
She began performing in her early teens. She made 20 audio-only recordings for GMM Grammy and later a further five for the Master Tape record label. She has since made a further series of recordings for Master Tape, variously entitled Luk tung sa on and Mor lam sa on, each on VCD, CD and audio tape formats ("sa on" in the Isan language meaning roughly "enjoyable").

A number of greatest hits collections have also been issued, some of which contain videos of songs from the first audio-only series. Her first five albums included only luk thung, but since then most have combined luk thung, mor lam and sometimes string (Thai pop). Her most famous string songs are "Mah Tummai" [Thai: มาทำไม] and "Faen Ja," both in collaboration with Thongchai McIntyre. She tours with a live show from September to May each year and has made several appearances in Europe and North America.

Among her best-known songs is "Sǎo Isǎan plát tìn" [Thai: สาวอีสานพลัดถิ่น] ("Isan girl separated from her home," album 9), which incorporates the typical Thai country themes of poverty, homesickness and an unfaithful lover. "Arlai World Trade" ("Mourning the World Trade Center," album Luk tung sa on 6) aroused comment in Thailand's English-language press for the way it addressed the 11 September 2001 attacks: "the reigning Morlam superstar of Thailand laments the attacks of September 11 while young, bare-midriffed Thai girls gyrate in front of a surging American flag".

In 2003, the Thai Ministry of Culture proposed banning one of her songs, "Tears of a Lieutenant's Wife" ("Namta mia nairoi") on state-run media.

By February 2006, she had released 38 original albums plus numerous compilations.

In 2007, she was singer of R-Siam and she was expired in 2017. She is singer of Cat 9 studio since 2018. She returned to popularlity by song title Tao Ngoi, and hit No. 1 on Thai music charts in 2018 - 2019, earning 123M YouTube views as of September 2019.

=== Acting ===
In 2001, Jintara played her first television role in the series Nai Hoy Tamin, about the life of rural people in Isan in historical times. She co-starred in the 2006 action film, Chai Lai (Dangerous Flowers), portraying a member of a top-secret team of female crimefighters.

== Personal life ==
In 2004, she began studying for a degree in Faculty of Humanities and Social Sciences at Suan Sunandha Rajabhat University, Bangkok, from which she was due to graduate in 2006. Newspaper reports suggested that she was considering standing as an MP for the Chart Thai (Thai Nation) party, but would not be able to do so until she had graduated; she did not stand in the 2005 election. She was awarded an honorary degree by Roi Et Rajabhat University in October 2004.

== Discography ==
=== Studio albums ===
Series number	Title song (Thai)	Title song (Romanised)	Release date	Ref.
No Label				
n/a	คิดถึงพี่ยาว	Kid Tueng Phee Yao	1985	
GMM Grammy (Grammy Entertainment)				
1	ถูกหลอกออกโรงเรียน	Took Lauk Okrong Rian	September 1987	
2	วานเพื่อนเขียนจดหมาย	Wan Puean Kian Jotmai	December 1987	
3	โสดบริสุทธิ์	Sot Borisut	January 1988	
4	สาวเวียงหนุ่มไทย	Sao Wiang Num Thai	June 1988	
5	แรงงานข้าวเหนียว	Raengngan Khaoniao	November 1988	
6	พลังรัก	Phalang Rak	March 1989	
7	ตามใจน้ำตา	Tamjai Namta	October 1989	
8	สาวไร่มัน	Sao Rai Man	April 1990	
9	สาวอีสานพลัดถิ่น	Sao Isan Plat Tin	August 1990	
10	ขอเป็นคนสุดท้าย	Kor Bpen Kon Soot Tai	February 1991	
11	จดหมายหลายฉบับ	Jotmai Lai Chabap	July 1991	
12	อำนาจรัก	Amnat Rak	December 1991	
13	คอยรักต่างแดน	Khoi Rak Tang Daen	August 1992	
14	ลำ 3 แบบ 3 สไตล์	Lam Sam Baep Sam Style	January 1993	
15	ไร่อ้อยคอยรัก	Rai Oy Koy Rak	April 1993	
16	เจ้าบ่าวหาย	Jao Bao Hai	August 1993	
Master Tape				
17	สิ้นหวังที่วังตะไคร้	Sin Wung Tee Wung Takrai	October 1994	
18	สงสารหัวใจ	Song Sarn Huajai	April 1995	
19	อวยพรให้เพื่อน	Uaipon Hai Puean	August 1995	
20	ขอรักฝ่ายเดียว	Khaw Rak Fai Diao	April 1996	
21	รักซ้อนรัก	Rak Son Rak	September 1996	
22	รอพี่ที่ บ.ข.ส.	Raw Pi Ti Baw-Khaw-Saw	January 1997	
23	ดื่มเพื่อลืมเศร้า	Duem Puea Luem Sao	May 1997	
24	รักโผล่โสนแย้ม	Rak Plo Sano Yaem	November 1997	
25	ผู้หนีช้ำ	Poo Nee Charm	January 1998	
Mor lam sa on 1	รักสลายดอกฝ้ายบาน	Rak Salai Dok Fai Ban	November 1998	
Luk tung sa on 2	น้ำตาสาววาริน	Namta Sao Warin	August 1999	
Mor lam sa on 3	น้ำตาหล่นบนเถียงนา	Namta Lawn Bon Tiang Nah	15 June 2000	
Luk tung sa on 4	สาวน้ำพองสะอื้น	Sao Nam Pong Sa-ern	11 January 2001	
Mor lam sa on 5	แตงโมจินตหรา	Taengmo Jintara	12 July 2001	
Luk tung sa on 6	ถ้วยป่นหลุดมือ	Tuay Pon Loot Mue	28 January 2002	
Mor lam sa on 7	นัดรอบ่พ้ออ้าย	Nad Roh Boh Poh Aye	4 July 2002	
Jin ma leaw ja 1	จินมาแล้วจ้า No. 1 ซังบ่าวเจ้าชู้	Sung Bao Jaochoo	6 March 2003	
Mor lam sa on 8	รูปหล่อหลายเมีย	Ruplaw Lai Mia	25 September 2003	
Luk tung sa on 9	สาวชุมแพแพ้รัก	Sao Choom Pae Pae Rak	8 April 2004	
Rock Mor lam sa on 10	พญานาคฝากรัก	Payanak Fak Rak	14 October 2004	
Luk tung sa on 11	คนนำทางใจ	Khon Namtang Jai	23 June 2005	
Mor lam sa on 12	ฮัลโหลโทรผิด	Hello Tor Pit	9 February 2006	
Mor lam sa on 13	ห่วงแฟนแดนชุมนุม	Huang Faen Daen Chum Num	26 October 2006	
Luk tung sa on 14	สาวทุ่งดอกจาน	Sao Tung Dock Jarn	29 March 2007	
RSiam				
Jintara Krob Krueng 1	ธนาคารน้ำตา	Thanakarn Namta	29 November 2007	
Jintara Krob Krueng 2	อยู่ข้างเธอเสมอ	Yoo Kung Ther Sumer	26 June 2008	
Jintara Krob Krueng 3	มิสซิสเหี่ยน	Mrs. Hien	29 January 2009	
Jintara Krob Krueng 4	ชีวิตฉันขาดเธอไม่ได้	Cheewit Chun Kaht Tur Mai Dai	11 February 2010	
Jintara Krob Krueng 5	ฝากคำขอโทษ	Fark Kum Kaw Todd	16 December 2010	
Jintara Krob Krueng 6	ขอใจฉันคืน	Koh Jai Chan Khun	22 December 2011	
Jintara Krob Krueng 7	เคยรักกันบ้างไหม	Koey Rak Kan Bang Mhai	28 February 2013	
Jintara Krob Krueng 8	อยากเป็นฉันในอ้อมกอดเธอ	Yark Pen Chun Nai Aom Kord Ter	27 March 2014	
Jintara Krob Krueng 9	เมียหลวงทวงสิทธิ์	Mia Luang Tuang Sith	3 December 2015	
Single	ใจช้ำที่คำชะโนด	Jai Chum Tee Kum Cha Nod	13 October 2016	
Single	ฮักแพงแสลงใจ	Hug paeng salaeng jai	3 April 2017	
Cat9 Studio				
EP Album	แฟนเราแต่เขาควง	Fan row tae kao kuang	10 August 2017	
Single	ให้น้องตายก่อนบ้อ	Hai nong tai gon baw	11 August 2017	
Single	เต่างอย	Tao ngoi	11 August 2017	
Single	คืนนี้พี่นอนกับใคร	Kuen nee pee non-gup krai	18 August 2017	
Single	ลำเต้ยซิ่ง เต่างอย	Lum toey zing Tao ngoi	27 February 2018	
Single	เซลฟี่แลกใจเธอ	Selfie lak jai ther	1 March 2018	
Single	คำสาบานเขยแม่มูล	Kum sa barn koei mae mool	22 March 2018	
Single	ไอ้ไข่นคร	Ai Kai na-korn	April 20, 2018	
Single	รักกับเขาแต่เหงากับฉัน	Ruk gub kow tae ngao gub chan	1 May 2018	
Single	อีหล่าขาเด้ง	E la ka deng	28 June 2018	
Single	วอนนางนอน	Won nang non	2 July 2018	
Single	หาหมอ	Ha maw	6 July 2018	
Single	ผาน้ำย้อย	Pha nam yoi	13 July 2018	
Single	ช้ำรักจากผาน้ำย้อย	Cham ruk jak Pha nam yoi	28 July 2018	
Single	ไม่รู้ไม่ผิด	Mai roo mai pid	3 August 2018	
Single	ฮักคนเดียวได้บ่	Hug kon diaw dai baw	14 August 2018	
Single	ยังรอ	Young raw	17 August 2018	
Single	บ่แย่งแฮปปี้	Baw yang happy	24 August 2018	
Single	สาวมาดฐาน	Sao Mard Tan	31 August 2018	
Single	สาวมาดฐาน (ม่วนสะเดิด)	Sao Mard Tan (V.Muan Sa Derd)	11 September 2018	
Single	น้ำตาหล่นบนบัวแดง	Nam tah lon bon Bua daeng	15 September 2018	
Single	น้ำตาสาวสุรินทร์	Nam tah sao Surin	12 October 2018	
Single	ฮอยฮักปักใจ	Hoi hug pug jai	2 November 2018	
Single	รอพี่ที่วัดฉลอง	Raw pee thee Wat Cha-long	16 November 2018	
Single	พิษต้านพิษ (ft.แซ็ค ชุมแพ)	Pit tan pit (ft. Sack Choompae)	7 January 2019	
Single	กะเทยห่าว	Ka toey how	18 January 2019	
Single	สาวพังโคน	Sao Pang khon	18 January 2019	
Single	จินตหราคอมโบ้	Jintara Combo	8 February 2019	
Single	สายร็อคสายลำ	Sai rock sai lum	23 March 2019	
Single	รอพี่ที่บึงกาฬ	Raw pee phee Bueng Karn	4 April 2019	
Single	ตั๋วกันได้กันดี	Tua gun dai gun dee	4 April 2019	
Single	คนไม่ใช่ทำอะไรก็ผิด	Kon mai chai tum arai gaw pid	6 April 2019	
Single	ภักดีที่เจ็บ	Pug dee thee jeb	6 April 2019	
Single	รปภ.	Ror Por Phor	April 12, 2019	
Single	บ่มักนิสัย	Bor Mak Ni Sai	26 April 2019	
Single	น้ำตาย้อยโป๊ก	Nam Ta Yoei Bok	2 July 2019	
Single	พื้นที่ทับซ้อน (ft.กระต่าย พรรณนิภา)	Puen Thee Thab Son (ft. Kratai Phannipha)	8 July 2019	
Single	สาวนานครพนม	Sao Na Nakhon Phanom	15 August 2019	
Single	ผลาบุญ	Pha la boon	7 September 2019	
Single	สาวนักเรียนตำตอ	Sao Nak Riean Tam Tor	30 September 2019	
Single	ลูกเป็ดขี้เหร่ (เพลงประกอบละคร กำนันอี๊ด (2552))	Look pet khee ray (OST.Gum Nun Eat 2009)	April 12, 2019	
Single	รักจริงพรือ (ft.ลิลลี่ ได้หมดถ้าสดชื่น)	Ruk jing prue (ft. Lilly Nareenat Chuealaem)	5 November 2019	
Single	ที่ต้องห้าม (ft.กระต่าย พรรณนิภา)	Tee tong harm (ft. Kratai Phannipha)	9 November 2019	
Single	จ๊วดจ๊าดฟาดบึ้ม	Juad jaad faad buem	29 November 2019	
Single	บ่ฮู้เด้อ	Baw hoo der	9 December 2019	
Single	ซานเล้าบันเทิงศิลป์ (ft.น้องทิวเทน)	San lao bun toeng silp (ft. Tiwten)	1 January 2020	
Single	หาดนางคอย	Had Nang Koy	8 January 2020	
Single	คุยเล่น ๆ (ft.ศาล สานศิลป์)	Kooi Len Len (ft. Sarn Sarnsilp)	25 January 2020	
Single	เทพนาคี	Thep Nah Kee	28 February 2020	
Single	ผีตาโขน	Phee Ta Khoan	20 March 2020	
Single	โควิดมาน้ำตาไหล	Covid Ma Nam Ta Lai	23 March 2020	
Single	ใส่แมสคอยอ้าย	Sai Mask Koy Ai	26 March 2020	
Single	ธาตุแท้ (ft.ใบปอ รัตติยา)	Thart Tae (ft. Baipor Rattiya)	31 March 2020	
Single	มหาสงกรานต์ (ft.กอล์ฟ ฟักกลิ้งฮีโร่)	Maha Songkran (ft. Golf F.HERO)	2 April 2020	
Single	อ่อนแอกะแพ้ไป (ft.กระต่าย พรรณิภา)	Oan ae kor phae pai (ft. Kratai Phannipha)	20 April 2020	
Single	ฮอยฮักปักใจ (ft.กระต่าย พรรณิภา)	Hoi hug pug jai (ft. Kratai Phannipha)	1 May 2020	
Single	สถานะหมอลำ	Sa ta na Mor Lum	15 May 2020	
Single	สาวชุมแพ (ลาลาลา)	Sao Chumpae (Lalala)	May 2020	
Single	หมอลำออนไลน์	Mor lam Online	July 2020	
Single	คอยอ้ายไหลเรือไฟ (ft. Biw Jitchareeya)	Koi Ai Lai Rua Fai	October 2023	

=== Compilations and live albums ===
Title (English)	Title (Thai)	Title (Romanised)	Release date	Ref.
1-2-3-4	รวมฮิต 1-2-3-4	Ruam hits 1-2-3-4	1989	
Ramphan lumplearn	รวมฮิต รำพัน-ลำเพลิน	Ruam hits Ramphan lumplearn	1993	
Pure Luk Thung Ten Golden Years	ลูกทุ่งล้วน ล้วน 10 ปีทอง	Luk tung luanluan 10 pi tawng	October 1997	
Live album : Jintara Poonlarp 1–2	บันทึกการแสดงสด จินตหรา พูนลาภ 1–2 (เทป)	Bun tuek garn sadaeng sot Jintara Poonlarp 1–2 (Cassette Tape)	1996	
Love Songs from Jintara 1-2-3	เพลงรักจากจินตหรา ชุดที่ 1-2-3	Plaeng rak jak Jintara 1-2-3	1996–1998	
Twelve Lam Verses	12 กลอนลำ	12 Glawn lam	October 1998	
Luk Thung Mor Lam	ลูกทุ่งหมอลำ	Luk tung mor lam	September 1999	
Hit Songs	เพลงเด่นกลอนดัง	Plaeng den glawn dang	6 December 2000	
Jintara on Love	จินตหราบอกรัก	Jintara bawk rak	26 October 2001	
14 Golden Years	14 ปีทอง	14 Pi tawng	14 March 002	
Fun	สนุกสนาน	Sanuk sanan	16 December 2002	
Lute-voiced Girl Jintara Poonlarp 1 (Live album)	คอนเสิร์ต สาวเสียงพิณ จินตหรา พูนลาภ ชุดที่ 1	Concert Sao siang pin Jintara Poonlarp 1	3 March 2003	
Jintara's Fans	แฟนจินตหรา	Faen Jintara	11 December 2003	
Isan Girls' Love Stories	ตำนานรักสาวอีสาน	Tamnan rak sao Isan	7 December 2004	
Luk Thung Mor Lam 2	ลูกทุ่งหมอลำ 2	Luk tung mor lam 2	11 March 2005	
Collected Hits 19 Golden Years Volume 1–2	รวมฮิต 19 ปีทอง ชุด 1–2	Ruam hit 19 pi tawng 1–2	2006	
Master Hits 1–2	มาสเตอร์ฮิต ชุดที่ 1–2	Master hits 1–2	February 2007	
Jintara Poonlarp : Jumbo Hits	จัมโบ้ฮิต	Jintara Poonlarp : Jumbo Hits	28 August 2009	
Double hits : Jintara Poonlarp & Sanook Singmart	ดับเบิ้ลฮิต จินตหรา พูนลาภ – สนุ๊ก สิงห์มาตร	Double hits : Jintara Poonlarp & Sanook Singmart	26 October 2010	
R-Siam No.1 – Jintara Poonlarp	อาร์สยาม นัมเบอร์ วัน จินตหรา พูนลาภ	R-Siam Number one – Jintara Poonlarp	28 September 2011	
RS Best Collection – Jintara Poonlarp	RS Best Collection จินตหรา พูนลาภ	RS Best Collection – Jintara Poonlarp		
R-Siam 10th Golden Years : Jintara Poonlarp & Sanook Singmart	อาร์สยาม 10 ปีทอง จินตหรา พูนลาภ – สนุ๊ก สิงห์มาตร	R-Siam 10 pi tawng : Jintara Poonlarp & Sanook Singmart		
Jintara krob ros	จินตหราครบรส	Jintara krob ros	19 September 2012	
Jintara Muan Lai	จินตหรา ม่วนหลาย	Jintara Muan Lai	21 November 2012	
Ruk Krob Krueng	รักครบเครื่อง	Ruk Krob Krueng	19 November 2013	
Loogthung Orn-Sorn	ลูกทุ่งออนซอน	Loogthung Orn-Sorn	5 September 2017	
Morlum Orn-Sorn	หมอลำออนซอน	Morlum Orn-Sorn	19 September 2017	

== Filmography ==
=== Television ===
Year	Title	Network	Role	Ref.
2001	Nay Hoi Tha Min	Channel 7	Bua Kieaw	
2009	Kam Nan Eed	Channel 7	n/a	

=== Film ===
Year	Title	Role	Notes	Ref.
2007	Chai Lai	Cha Baa	n/a	
