= Supaksorn Chaimongkol =

Thai model and actress (born 1982)

- ศุภักษร ไชยมงคล
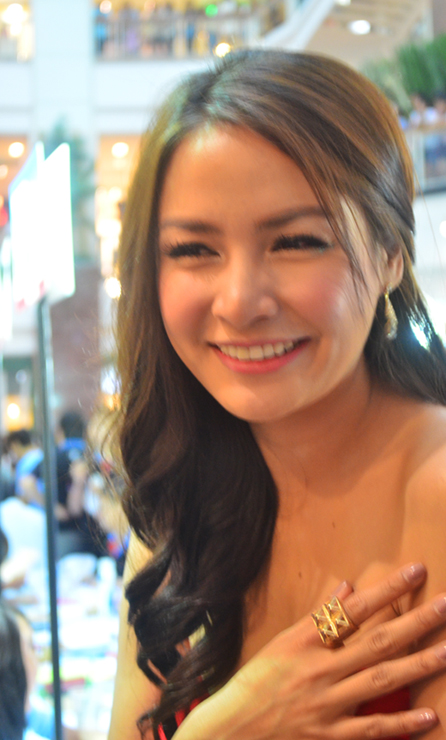
- Supaksorn in 2012
- Born: December 2, 1982 (age 43); Hang Dong District, Chiang Mai, Thailand
- Other name: Kratae (กระแต)
- Modeling information
- Height: 1.71 m (5 ft 7 in)
- Hair color: Black
- Eye color: Dark Brown

Supaksorn Chaimongkol (Thai: ศุภักษร ไชยมงคล; RTGS: Suphakson Chaimongkhon; born December 2, 1982) is a Thai model and actress. Her nickname is Kratae (Thai: กระแต).

She graduated a bachelor of Communication Arts from Rangsit University.

Her film roles include Kunpan: Legend of the Warlord, Art of the Devil and Andaman Girl, all under director Thanit Jitnukul.

In 2007, she starred in the spy-action comedy, Chai Lai, directed by Poj Arnon, and the martial arts drama Brave, featuring Thai stunt actor Pairote Boongerd (Mike B.) and Malaysian comedian Afdlin Shauki. The film started to air in April 2012 in Malaysia.

In 2008, she starred in Handle Me With Care, a romantic drama written and directed by Kongdej Jaturanrasamee.

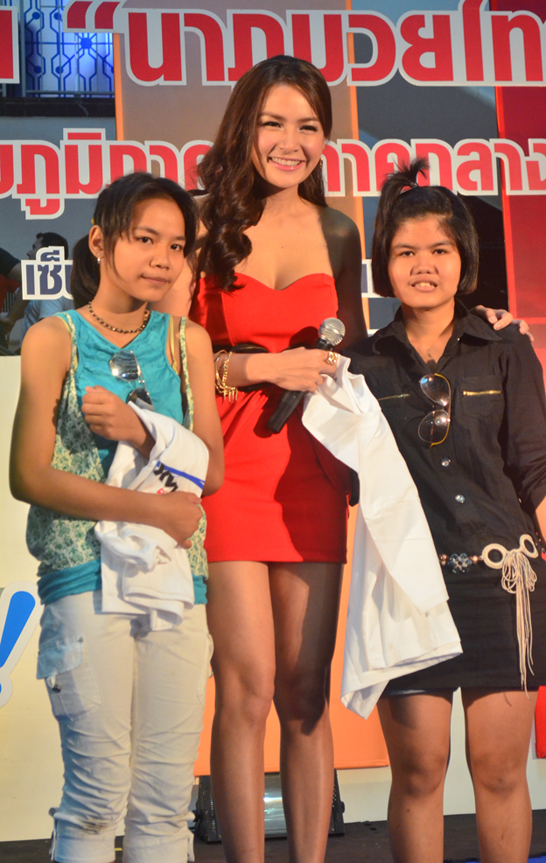
Supaksorn Chaimongkol.

== Filmography ==
Year	Title	Role
2002	The Trek (Dong phayaa fai)	Air
2002	Kunpan: Legend of the Warlord	Kaew Kiriya
2004	Art of the Devil (Khon len khong)	Boom
2005	Andaman Girl (Jee)	Jee
2006	Dangerous Flowers (Chai Lai)	Lotus
2007	Navy Boys (Nam prik lhong rua)	Phuu-Kawng Phrik
2007	Khon hew hua	Sao
2007	Brave	Lita
2008	Handle Me With Care (Kod)	Na
2008	5 Taew	Kru Somsri
2010	Still (ตายโหง)	Nuan
2010	Bangkok Knockout	Joy
2013	Paew Shop (โลงจำนำ)	
2024	My Marvellous Dream Is You (ฝันรักห้วงนิทรา)	Ae
2024	My Love Mix-Up!	Kongthap's mother
