= Music of Thailand =

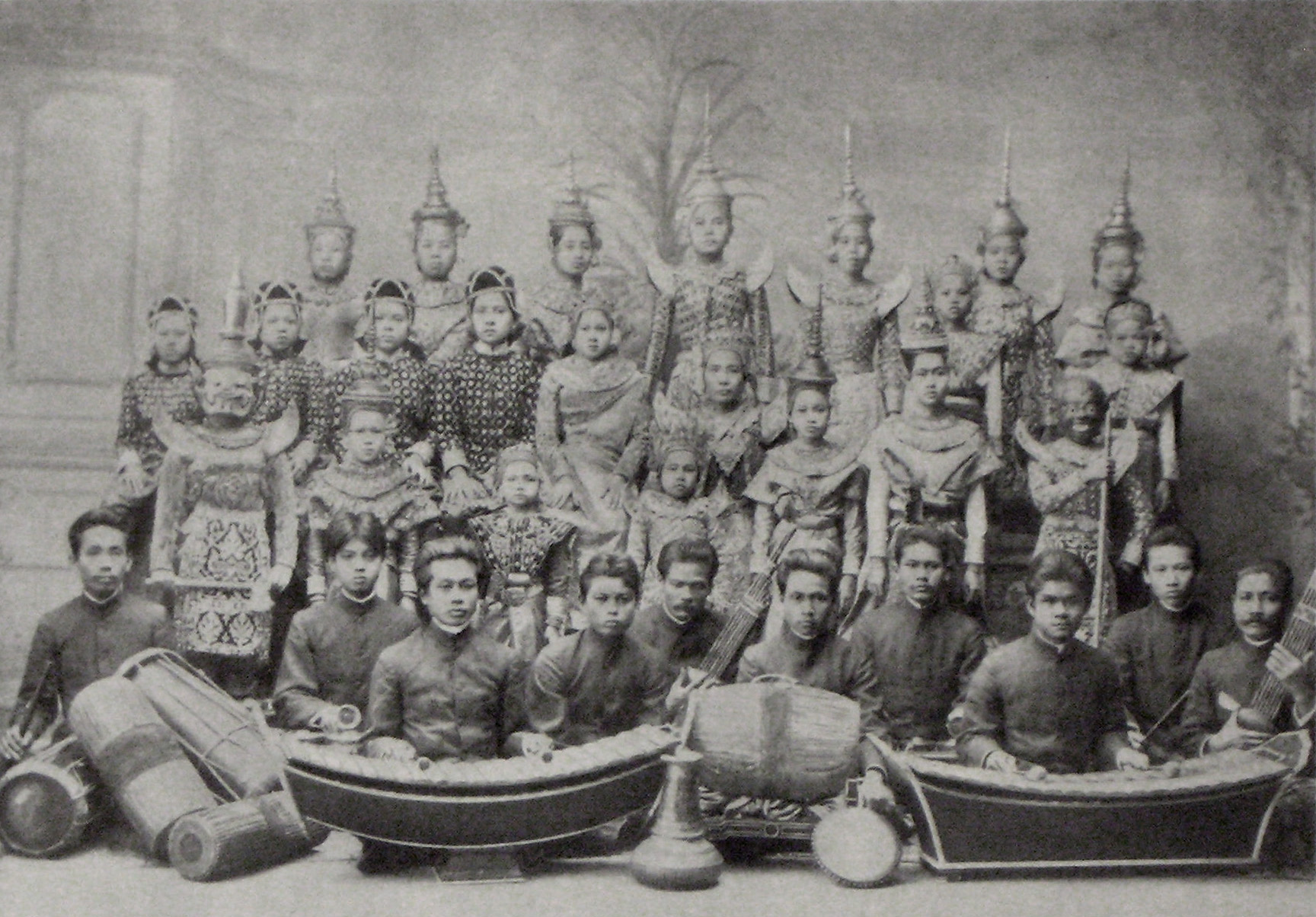
Siamese theater group of "Nai Boosra Mahin" which performed in Berlin, Germany in 1900.

The music of Thailand includes a wide array of distinct genres, both traditional and modern.

Traditional Thai musical instruments are varied and reflect ancient influence from far afield – including the klong thap and khim (Persian origin), the chakhe (Indian origin), the klong chin (Chinese origin), and the klong khaek (Indonesian origin).

The two most popular styles of traditional Thai music are luk thung and mor lam. The latter in particular has close affinities with the music of Laos.

Aside from the Thai, ethnic minorities such as the Lao, Lawa, Hmong, Akha, Khmer, Lisu, Karen and Lahu peoples have retained traditional musical forms.

Though Thailand was never colonized by colonial powers, pop music and other forms of modern Asian, European and American music have become extremely influential.

== Traditional and folk music ==
=== Classical music ===
"Kham Hom" ("Sweet Words")
Wax cylinder recording of "Kham Hom", or "Sweet Words", performed by the theater group above.

"Sansoen Phra Barami" ("Royal Anthem")
Wax cylinder recording of "Sansoen Phra Barami", the Thai Royal Anthem, performed by the theater group above.

Thai classical music scale
The seven-note scale of Thai classical music played on the ranat ek

Thai classical music is synonymous with those stylized court ensembles and repertoires that emerged in their present form within the royal centers of Central Thailand some 800 years ago. These ensembles, while being influenced by older practices and repertoires from India, are today uniquely Thai expressions. While the three primary classical ensembles, the Piphat, Khrueang sai and Mahori differ in significant ways, they all share a basic instrumentation and theoretical approach. Each employs small ching hand cymbals and krap wooden sticks to mark the primary beat reference. Thai classical music has had a wide influence on the musical traditions of neighboring countries. The traditional music of Myanmar was strongly influenced by the Thai music repertoire, called Yodaya (ယိုးဒယား), which was brought over from the Ayutthaya Kingdom. As Siam expanded its political and cultural influence to Laos and Cambodia during the early Rattanakosin period, its music was quickly absorbed by the Cambodian and Lao courts.

As Frédéric Maurel explains:

"From the close of the eighteenth century and through the nineteenth century, a number of Khmer pages, classical women dancers, and musicians studied with Thai ajarn (masters or teachers) in Cambodia. The presence of this Thai elite in Cambodia contributed to the development of strong Thai cultural influence among the Khmer upper classes. Moreover, some members of the Khmer royal family went to the Thai court and developed close relations with well-educated Thai nobility, as well as several court poets. Such cultural links were so powerful that, in some fields, one might use the term 'Siamization' in referring to the processes of cultural absorption at the Khmer court at that time."

Several kinds of small drums (klong) are employed in these ensembles to outline the basic rhythmic structure (natab) that is punctuated at the end by the striking of a suspended gong (mong). Seen in its most basic formulation, the classical Thai orchestras have a very strong influence on the Cambodian (Khmer) pinpeat and mahori ensembles, and are structurally similar to other orchestras found within the widespread Southeast Asian gong-chime musical culture, such as the large gamelan ensembles of Bali and Java, which most likely have their common roots in the diffusion of Vietnamese Dong-Son bronze drums beginning in the first century.

Traditional Thai classical repertoire is anonymous, handed down through an oral tradition of performance in which the names of composers (if, indeed, pieces were historically created by single authors) are not known. However, since the beginning of the modern Bangkok period, composers' names have been known and, since around the turn of the century, many major composers have recorded their works in notation. Musicians, however, imagine these compositions and notations as generic forms which are realized in full in idiosyncratic variations and improvisations in the context of performance.

=== Piphat ===
Piphat is the most common and iconic Thai classical music style. It symbolizes the dancing of Thailand's legendary dragons, and consists of a midsized orchestra including two xylophones (ranat), an oboe (pi), barrel drums (klong) and two circular sets of tuned horizontal gong-chimes (khong wong lek and khong wong yai). Piphat can be performed in either a loud outdoor style using hard mallets (Piphat mai khaeng; ปี่พาทย์ไม้แข็ง) or in an indoor style using padded hammers (Piphat mai nuam; ปี่พาทย์ไม้นวม).

Piphat in Wat Khung Taphao.

There are several types of piphat ensembles ranging in size and orchestration, each kind typically being associated with specific ceremonial purposes. The highly decorated piphat ensemble that features the ornately carved and painted semicircular vertical gong-chime is traditionally associated with the funeral and cremation ceremonies of the Mon ethnic group. Different versions of the piphat ensemble are employed to accompany specific forms of traditional Thai drama such as the large shadow puppet theater (nang yai) and the khon dance drama.

=== Khrueang sai ===
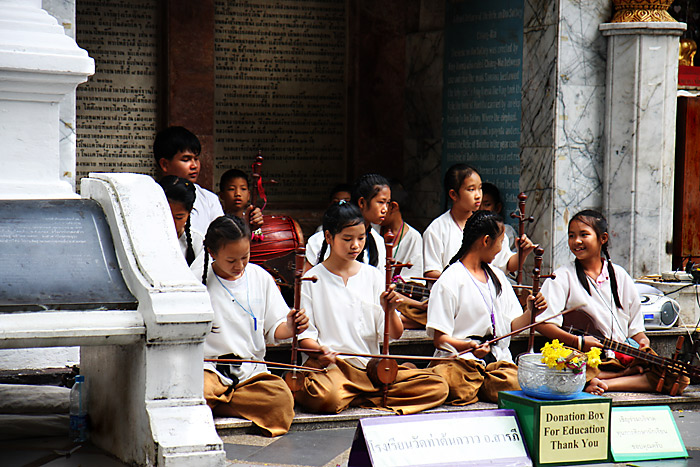
Schoolgirls and boys playing khrueang sai in front of a temple

The khrueang sai orchestra combines some of the percussion of wind instruments of the piphat with an expanded string section including the saw duang (a high-pitched two-string bowed lute), the lower pitched saw u (bowed lute) and the three-string chakee (a plucked zither). In addition to these instruments are the khlui (vertical fipple flute) in several sizes and ranges, a goblet drum (thon-rammana) and, occasionally, a small hammered Chinese dulcimer (khim). The khrueang sai ensemble is primarily used for instrumental indoor performances and for accompanying the Thai hoon grabok (stick-puppet theater), a genre deeply influenced by Chinese puppetry styles. Accordingly, the addition of Chinese-sounding string instruments in the khrueang sai ensemble is imagined, by the Thai, to be a reference to the probable Chinese origins of this theater form.

=== Mahori ===
The third major Thai classical ensemble is the Mahori, traditionally played by women in the courts of both Central Thailand and Cambodia. Historically the ensemble included smaller instruments more appropriate, it was thought, to the build of female performers. Today the ensemble employs regular-sized instruments, made up of a combination of instruments from both the Khrueang sai and Piphat ensembles but excluding the loud and rather shrill oboe pi. The ensemble, which is performed in three sizes—small, medium and large—includes the three-string saw sam sai fiddle, a delicate-sounding, middle-range bowed lute with silk strings. Within the context of the Mahori ensemble, the so sam sai accompanies the vocalist, which plays a more prominent role in this ensemble than in any other classical Thai orchestra.

While Thai classical music was somewhat discouraged as being unmodern and backward looking during Thailand's aggressively nationalistic modernization policies of mid-20th century, the classical arts have benefited recently from increased governmental sponsorship and funding as well as popular interest as expressed in such films as Homrong: The Overture (2003), a popular fictionalized biography of a famous traditional xylophone (ranat ek) performer.

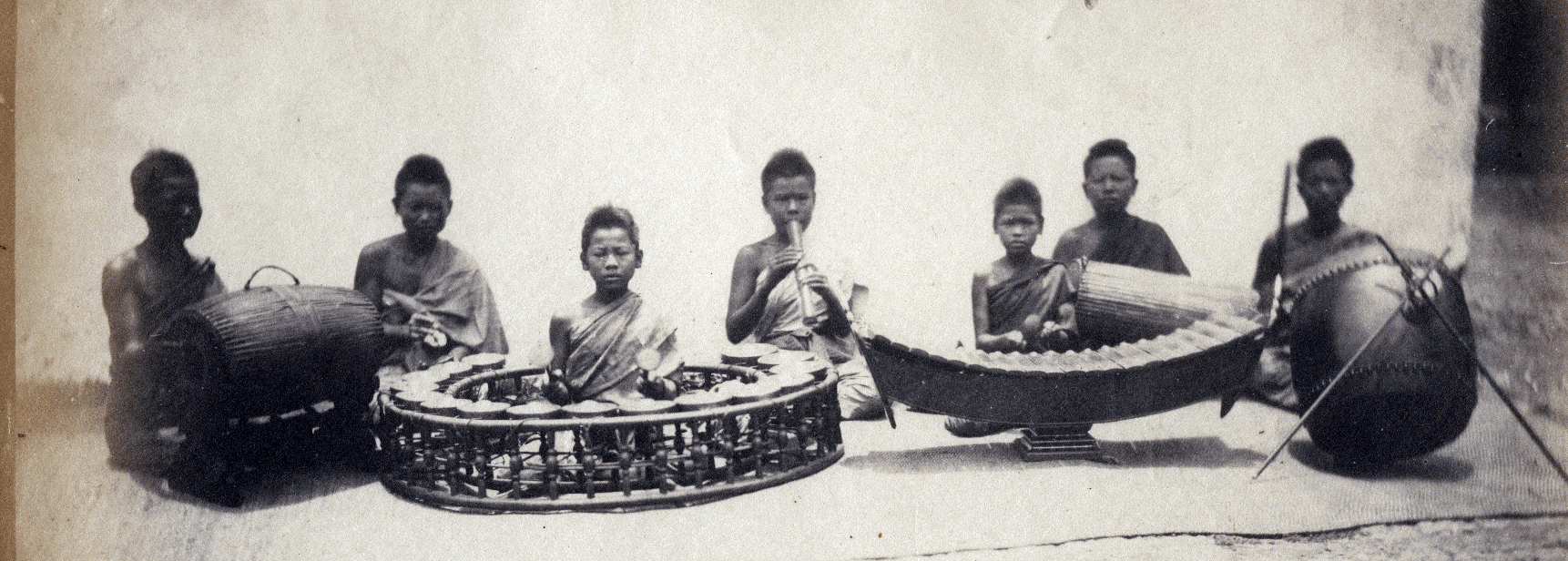
A Thai orchestra in 1900

=== Luk thung ===
Luk thung, or Thai country music, developed in the mid-20th century to reflect daily trials and tribulations of rural Thais. Pongsri Woranut and Suraphol Sombatcharoen were the genre's first big stars, incorporating influences from other parts of Asia. Many of the most popular artists have come from the central city of Suphanburi, including megastar Pumpuang Duangjan, who pioneered electronic luk thung. The late 1990s saw a commercial resurgence of Luk Thung, and the modern electrified, pop-influenced version of the genre remains the country's most popular music form.

=== Mor Lam ===
Mor lam is the dominant folk music of Thailand's north-eastern Isan region, which has a mainly Lao population. It has much in common with luk thung, such as its focus on the life of the rural poor. It is characterized by rapid-fire, rhythmic vocals and a funk feel to the percussion. The lead singer, also called a mor lam, is most often accompanied by the khaen, also known as khene.

There are about fifteen regional variations of mor lam, plus modern versions such as mor lam sing. Some conservatives have criticized these as the commercialization of traditional cultures.

=== Kantrum ===
Kantrum is played by Khmer living near the border with Cambodia. It is a swift and very traditional dance music. In its purest form, cho-kantrum, singers, percussion and tro (a type of fiddle) dominate the sound. A more modern form using electric instrumentation arose in the mid-1980s. Later in the decade, Darkie became the genre's biggest star, and he crossed into mainstream markets in the later 1990s.

== Musical instruments ==
Examples of traditional instruments

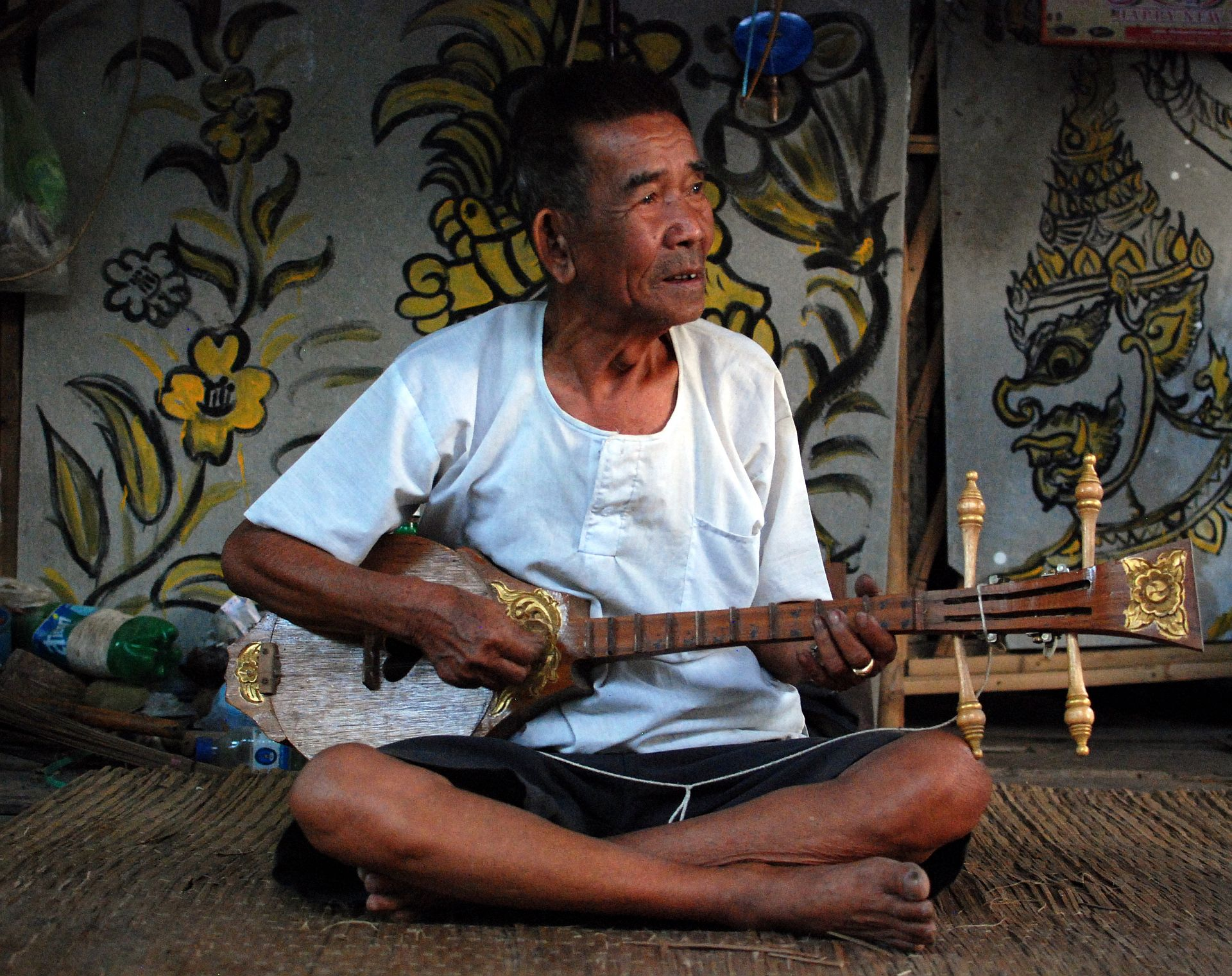
A music teacher in Mae On, near Chiang Mai, playing a sueng.

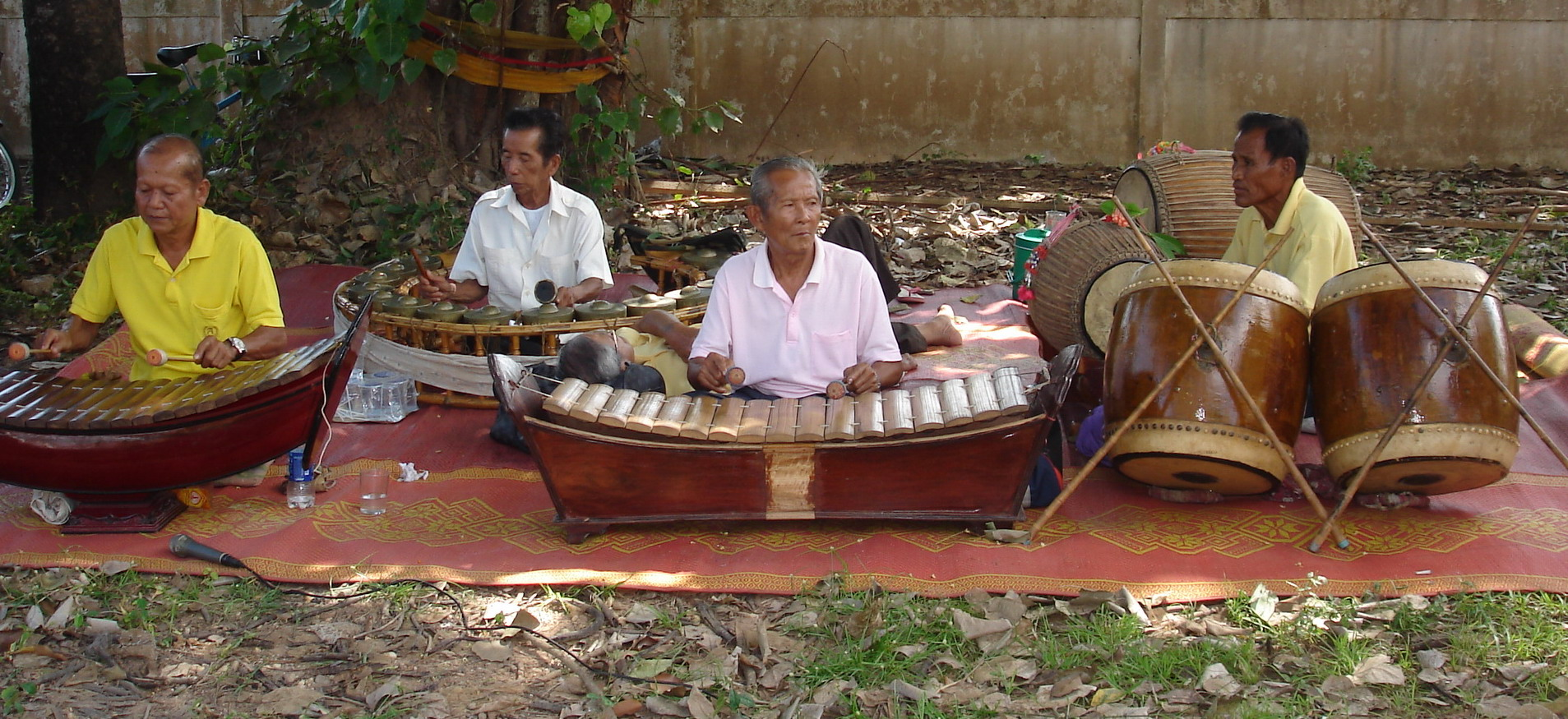
A group of musicians playing traditional Ranat.

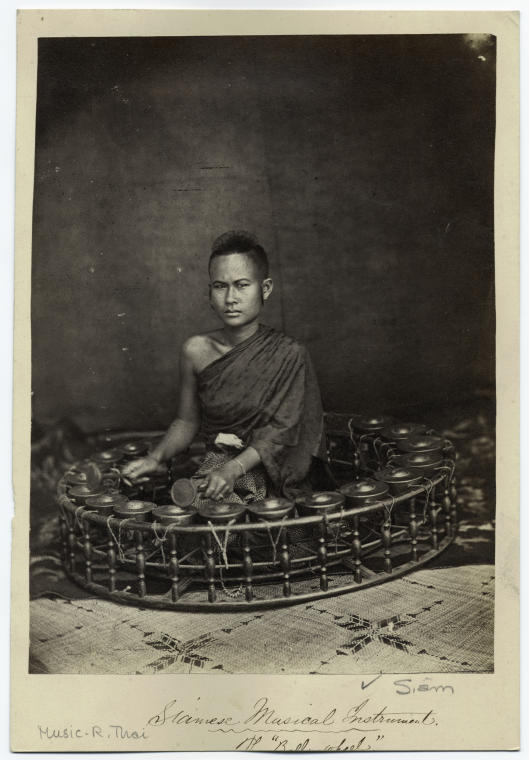
A Khong wong lek being played.

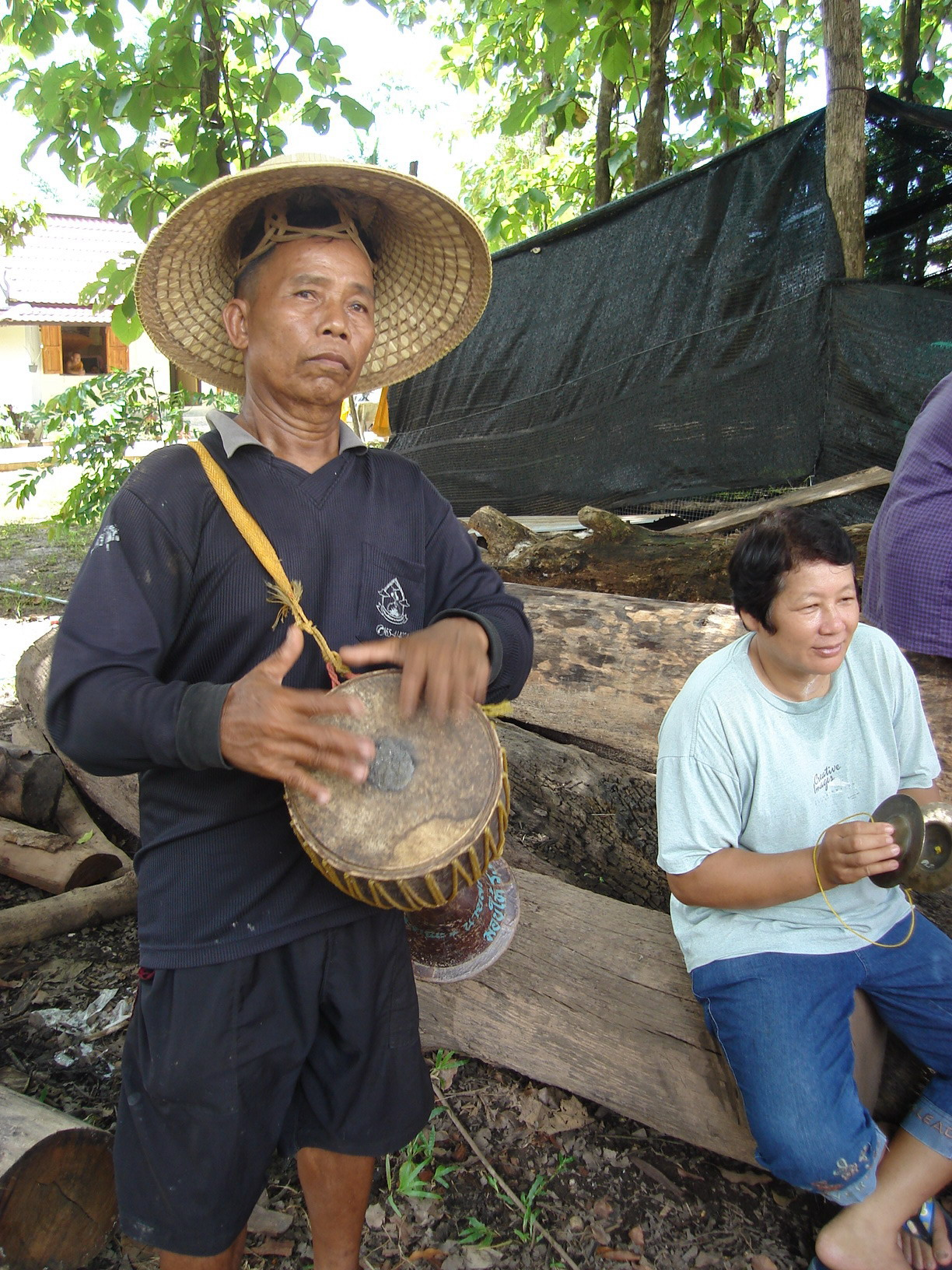
Medium Klong yao hand-drum, player in Laos

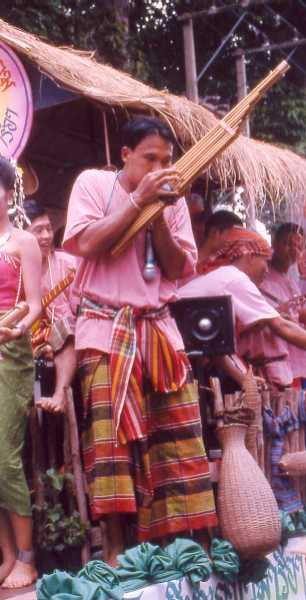
Khaen player in a sarong and pakama.

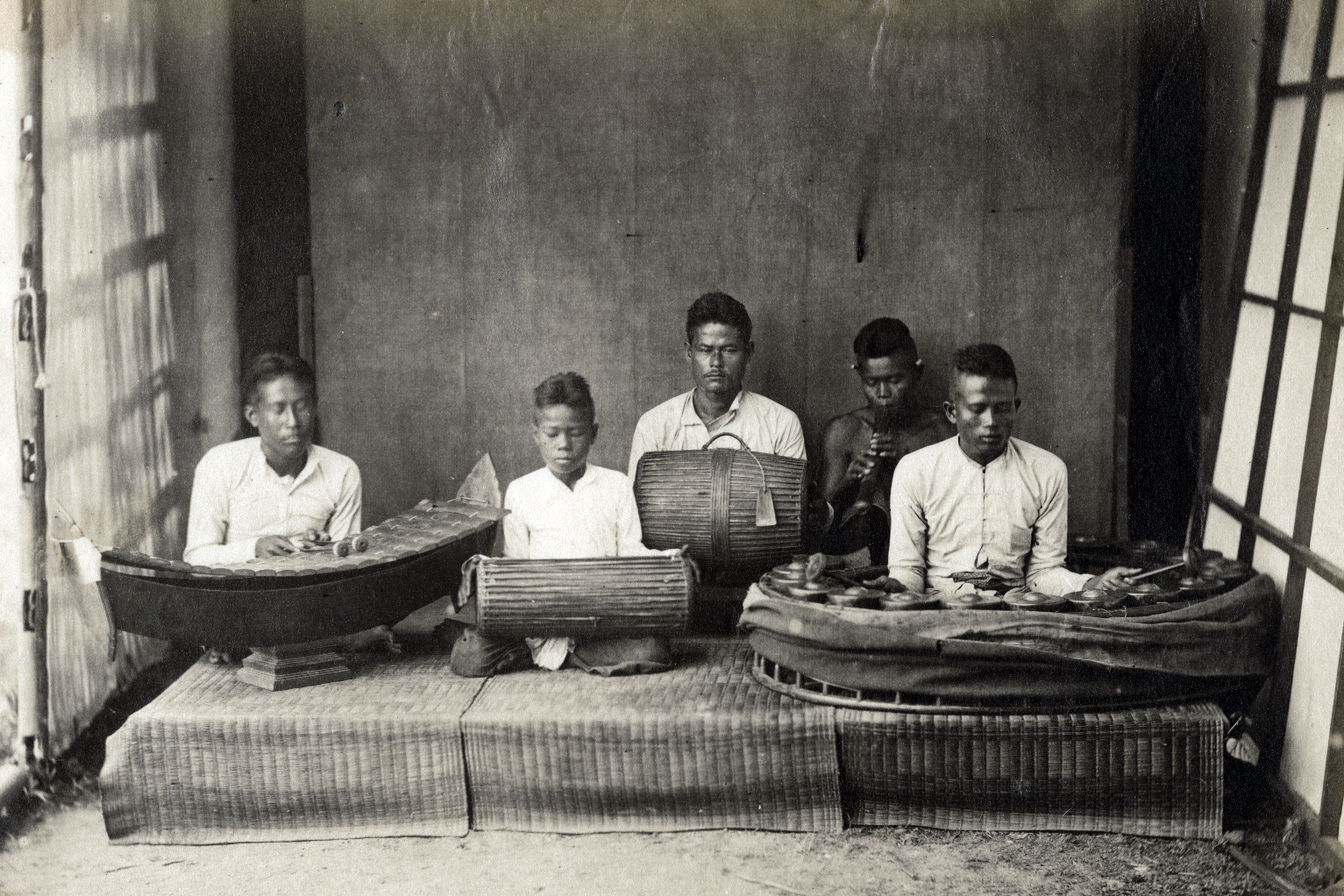
A Thai orchestra or Traditional Thai musical ensembles in 1900

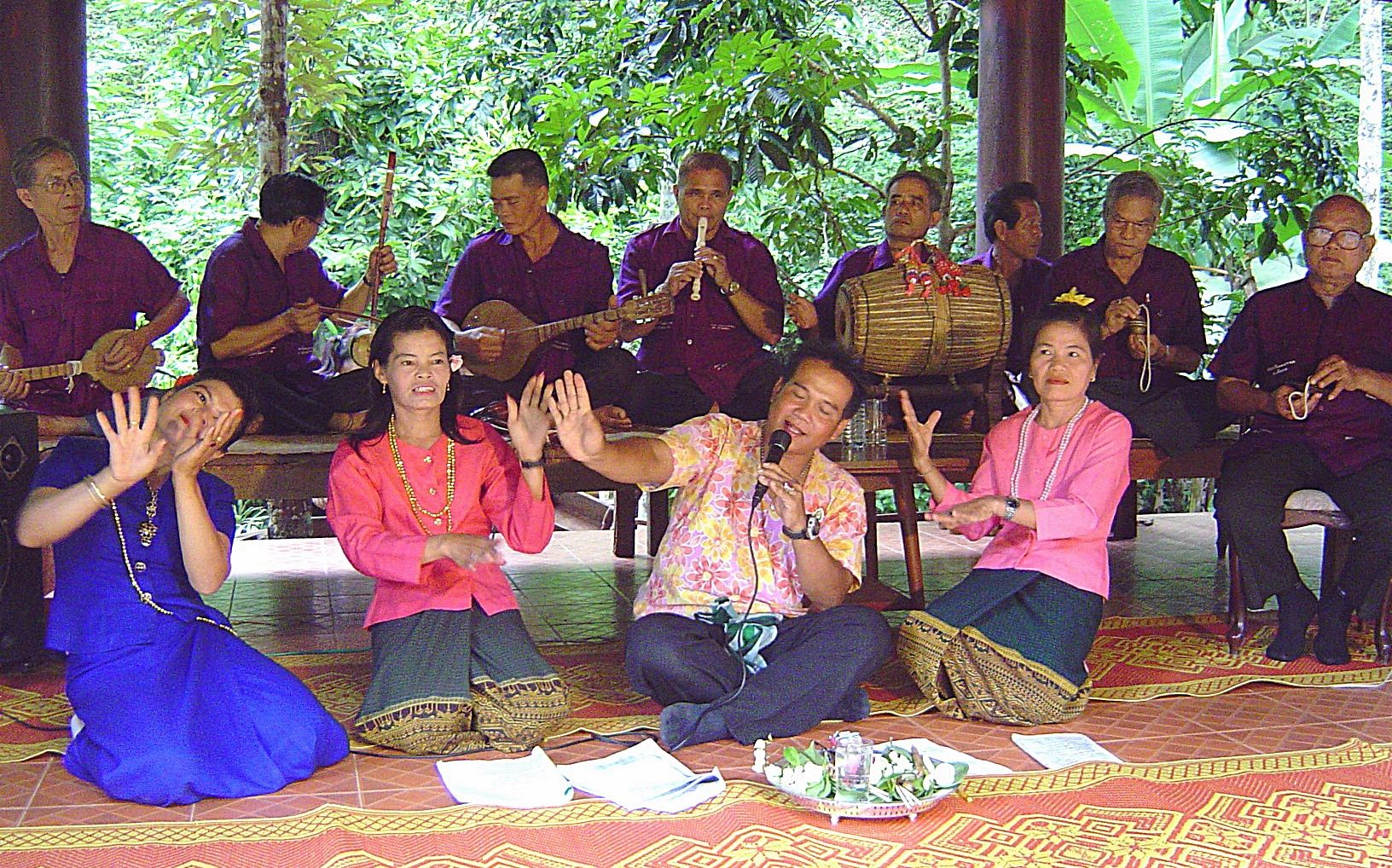
Thai traditional musical ensembles at Wat Kungtapao Local Museum

== Arrival of Western music ==
While the composer Luang Pradit Phairau (1881–1954) used localized forms of cipher (number) notation, other composers such as Montri Tramote (1908–1995) used standard western staff notation. Several members of the Thai royal family have been deeply involved in composition, including King Prajadhipok (Rama VII, 1883–1941) and King Bhumibol Adulyadej (1927–2016), whose compositions have been more often for jazz bands than classical Thai ensembles.

Classical Thai music is polyphonic and follows similar conventions to American folk and dixieland music. Each instrument improvises within accepted idioms around basic lines of harmony or melody called paths. Rhythmically and metrically Thai music is steady in tempo, regular in pulse, divisive, in simple duple meter, without swing, with little syncopation (p. 3, 39), and with the emphasis on the final beat of a measure or group of pulses and phrase (p. 41), as opposed to the first as in European-influenced music. The Thai scale includes seven tempered notes, instead of a mixture of tones and semitones. Five of seven pitches are used as the principal pitches in any mode, introducing nonequidistant intervals.

=== Phleng phra racha nipon ===
From the 1940s to the 1970s King Bhumibol Adulyadej wrote a total of 48 compositions. It was during this time that he decided to specialize in wind instruments, especially the saxophone and the clarinet. By the time Bhumibol turned 18, he started to compose his own music with the first song being "Candlelight Blues". He continued to compose even during his reign following his coronation in 1946. Bhumibol performed with Preservation Hall Jazz Band, Benny Goodman, Stan Getz, Lionel Hampton, and Benny Carter. Throughout his life, Bhumibol wrote a total of 49 compositions. Much of it is jazz swing but he also composed marches, waltzes, and Thai patriotic songs. His most popular compositions were "Candlelight Blues", "Love at Sundown" and "Falling Rain", which were all composed in 1946. Bhumibol's musical influences included Louis Armstrong, Sidney Bechet, Benny Carter, and Johnny Hodges. Bhumibol also performed with his band at Thai universities, composing anthems for the universities of Chulalongkorn, Thammasat, and Kasetsart.

=== Rock ===
By the 1930s, however, Western classical music, showtunes, jazz and tango were popular. Soon, jazz grew to dominate Thai popular music, and Khru Eua Sunthornsanan soon set up the first Thai jazz band. The music he soon helped to invent along with influential band Suntharaporn was called pleng Thai sakorn, which incorporated Thai melodies with Western classical music. This music continued to evolve into luk grung, a romantic music that was popular with the upper-class. King Bhumibol was an accomplished jazz musician and composer.

=== Phleng phuea chiwit ===
By the 1960s, Western rock was popular and Thai artists began imitating bands like Cliff Richard & the Shadows; this music was called "wong shadow", and it soon evolved into a form of Thai pop called "string". Among the groups that emerged from this period was The Impossibles. The '70s also saw Rewat Buddhinan beginning to use the Thai language in rock music as well as the rise of protest songs called phleng phuea chiwit ("songs for life").

The earliest phleng phuea chiwit band was called Caravan, and they were at the forefront of a movement for democracy. In 1976, police and right wing activists attacked students at Thammasat University; Caravan, along with other bands and activists, fled for the rural hills. There, Caravan continued playing music for local farmers, and wrote songs that would appear on their later albums.

In the 1980s, phleng phuea chiwit re-entered the mainstream with a grant of amnesty to dissidents. Bands like Carabao became best-sellers and incorporated nationalistic elements in their lyrics. By the 1990s, phleng phuea chiwit had largely fallen from the top of the Thai charts, though artists like Pongsit Kamphee continued to command a large audience.

=== String ===
String pop took over mainstream listeners in Thailand in the 1990s, and exponents like Christina Aguilar, Bird Thongchai McIntyre and Asanee-Wasan became best-sellers. Simultaneously, Britpop influenced alternative rock artists like Modern Dog, Loso, Crub and Proud became popular in late 1990s. In 2006, famous Thai rock bands include Clash, Big Ass, Bodyslam and Silly Fools. The late 1990s saw pop overshadowed by the remarkable commercial resurgence of luk thung, but modern luk thung has also adopted some elements from the pop acts.

=== Heavy metal ===
Heavy metal music in Thailand was very popular in early 90s. Many heavy metal bands in this era included Hi-Rock, Stone Metal Fire, I-Scream, Uranium and Big Gun.

== Indie ==
A group of independent artists and records which produces music for non-commercial purpose also found in Thailand: Bakery Music (now under Sony Music) ; Smallroom ; FAT radio ; City-Blue ; Coolvoice ; Dudesweet ; Idea-radio Panda Records ; and SO::ON Dry Flower .

== See also ==
- Korphai ensemble
- Traditional Thai musical instruments
- BEC-TERO
- GMM Grammy
- RS Music
- Thai Elephant Orchestra
