= Mantana Morakul =

Thai singer and actress (1923–2026)

- มัณฑนา โมรากุล
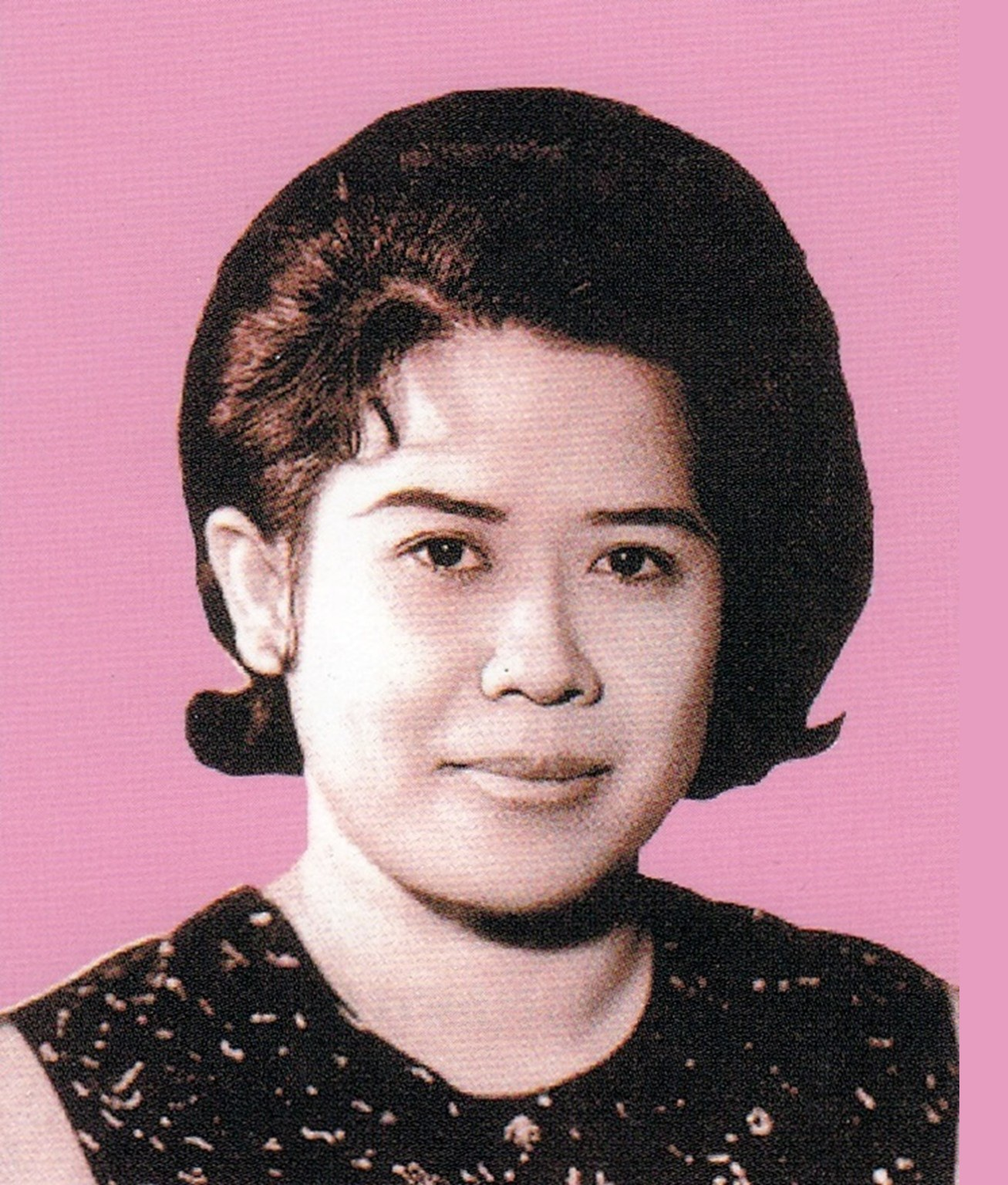
- Morakul in the 1960s
- Born: Charoen Morakul (เจริญ โมรากุล); 30 March 1923; Dusit District, Siam
- Died: 8 March 2026 (aged 102); Bangkok, THailand
- Other names: Saengchamroen Morakul (แสงจำเริญ โมรากุล); Churee Morakul (จุรี โมรากุล); Chamnan Krueasuwan (จำนรรค์ เครือสรวรรณ)
- Occupations: Singer; actress
- Years active: 1935–1975
- Spouse: Bunyhong Keartiwongs
- Children: 4
- Awards: 2009 – National Artist (Thailand) Performing arts (Thai music – singing)

Mantana Keartiwongs (Thai: มัณฑนา เกียรติวงศ์), known by the original name Mantana Morakul (มัณฑนา โมรากุล, RTGS: Manthana Morakun; 30 March 1923 – 8 March 2026) was a Thai singer and actress who became the first female singer and the oldest member in the Public Relations Department band, Luk Krung singer, and the Early Era singer of the Suntaraporn Band. Mantana also was the National artist of 2009 in Performing arts (Thai music – singing).

== Early life ==
Mantana was born on 30 March 1923, the fourth child of Luang Siriratchsap (Chai Morakul) (1896–1961), Officer of The Comptroller General's Department, and Phan Morakul (née Krueasuwan).

She changed names numerous times; when she was born, his father was promoted in ranks, so Prapayurawongs changed to "Charoen" (เจริญ which means advanced) because she was born with her dad prosperous. Times passed by when Mantana received a chance to play in The Banthomsin band of Phraya Aniruthatewa (Fuen Phuengboon); she used "Saengchamroen" as her name. She sang her first song in 1935, "KhaneungRak" sang along with "Saengsom Saengyakhom". In 1939 she practiced singing with Kru Sakhon Mitranont and later changed her name to "Churee". In 1942 Plaek Phibunsongkhram changed her name to "Mantana".

Mantana first practiced singing with Mismaccan in the Christian church, Nakhon Si Thammarat Province. She started singing Plehng Thai Derm with Kru Cher Buranont. Later, she was inspired by the Phleng Thai sakon song "Chamrus Suwoks". Mantana studied in Saowapha School (now the Saowabha Vocational College) but only learned Mathayom 2 (Grade 8) due to financial problems thus she only practiced singing with Kru Sakhon Mitranont and Kru Pim Puangnark and performed with a Charukanok band until she got the chance to record in 1939 "Nam Nuea Bah" by Pim Puangnark.

== Career ==
Mantana got a chance to sing at Prince Aditya Dibabha's birthday at Amphorn Sathan Residential Hall, Dusit Palace on 24 July 1940; Mantana was persuaded by The Director General of The Advertising Department, Wilart Ostanont, to be a singer in the department, but Mantana was 17 during that time and could not be Civil Servant because she was too young, so she became extraordinary employee first until she matured to required age. She then became a singer and the first female singer of a band.

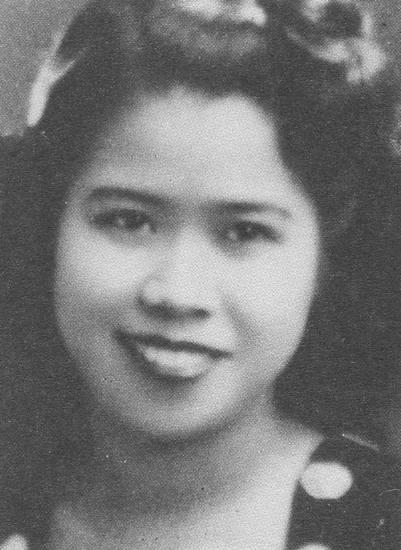
Mantana Morakul in 1939, at the age of 16

In her serving times, Mantana recorded over 200 songs, varied from soul-stirring pieces, Compositions by Bhumibol Adulyadej to international-style Thai music; Mantana got a chance to sing "Tewapa Ku Fan" and "Duangchai Kub Kwam Rak" in front of King Bhumibol Adulyadej and Queen Sirikit in "Marriage Coronation" banquet day at Sa Pathum Palace in 1950, she was one of the first Thai female singers who used Western singing styles. She was also an early era Spokesperson for The Advertising Department; she was a member of the department before resigning from government service in 1951 to marry the love of her life, Bunyong Keartiwongs. She had four children in total.

After resigning from Civil Serving, she started a business with Bunyhong Keartiwongs (her husband): the Sri Phran Nok Cinema, Phran Nok Road, Ban Chang Lo, Bangkok until the business burned down. One of the movies she made was Marn Rak in 1973; she wrote all the stories and helped sing for television programs until 1945. She retired due to health problems. She lived with her children at her house, Thanon Phutthamonthon Sai 2. But still appeared in specific concerts, such as:

- "Dao Pradub Fah Manthana Morakul" Concert. Set up at the Thailand Cultural Centre, 21 May 1995, in honor of her 72nd birthday.
- "Nimit Chai Peang Fan 80 Pii Manthana Morakul" Concert, Set up by Fine Arts Department with the Public Relations Department at the Thailand Cultural Centre, 16 November 2003, in honor of her 80th birthday that year.
- "Yorn Wela kub Manthana Morakul" Concert, at Princess Maha Chakri Sirindhorn Anthropology Centre on 25 March 2007, in her 84th birthday.
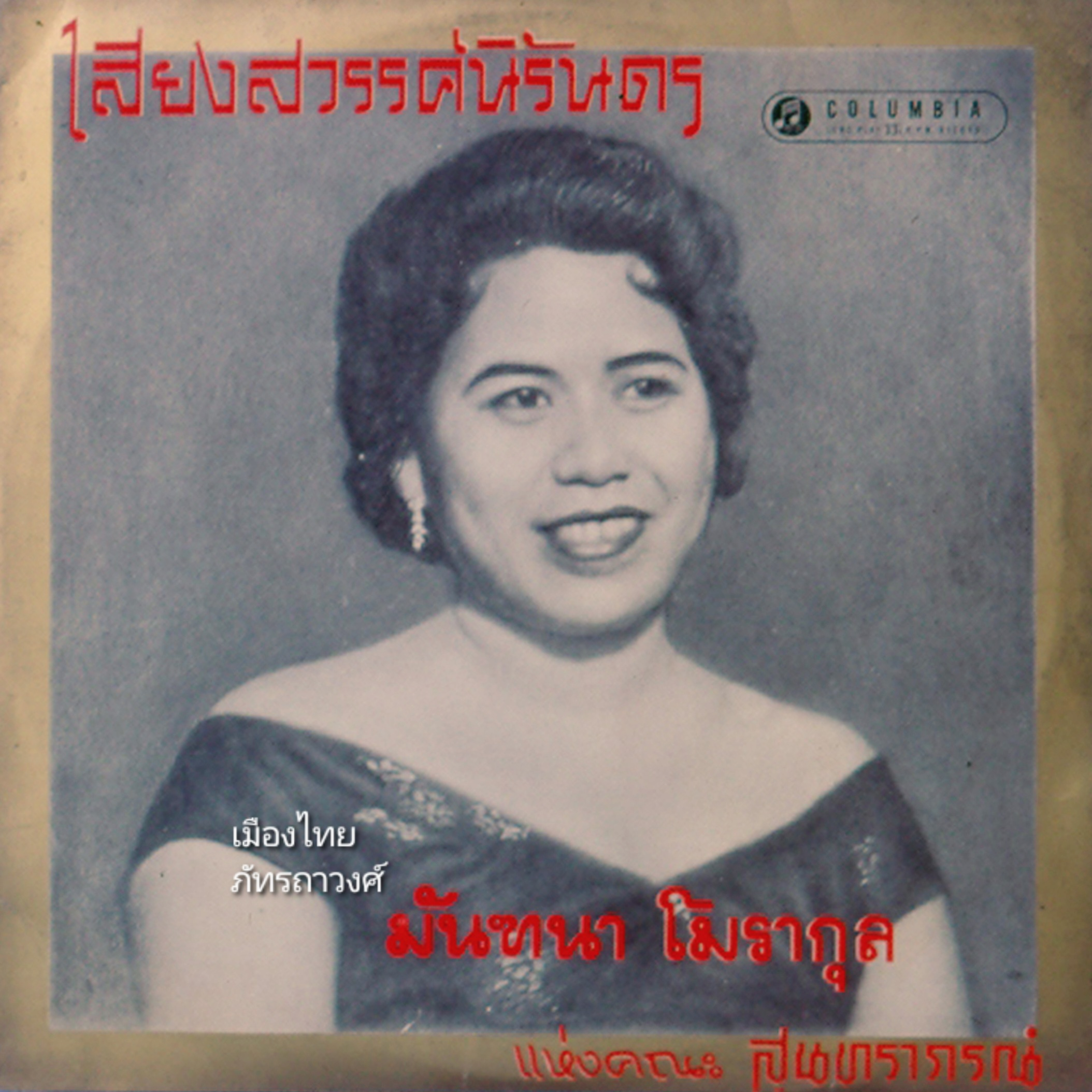
- "Mantana Morakul" National Artist (Thailand) on the cover of vinyl records long play of Kamol Sukosol Electric Co. Ltd., mix of famous songs around 1950 – 1952 into long play in 1965 – 1966
  "Dao Pradub Fah Manthana Morakul Sinlapin Haeng Chart" Concert, set up at the Public Relations Department Centre on 18 April 2010.

== Death ==
Mantana died at her home in Phutthamonthon Sai 2, Bangkok, on 8 March 2026, at the age of 102. At the time of her death she was the oldest surviving member of the Suntaraporn Band.

== Honors ==
- Selected from Ministry of Culture to be The National Artist in Performing arts (Thai music – singing) of 2009, on 7 January 2010.

== Compositions ==
Manthana also composed lyrics for songs such as:

- Wassana Kratai (sung by Eua Sunthornsanan and also one of the favorite songs of Princess Bejaratana Rajasuda)
- Chai Noh Chai (sung by Chanthana Obayawarth)
- Rak mee kam (sung by Winai Chulabutsapa)
- Siang Du wao (sung by Marisa Amartayakul)
- Ratrii Sud Tai (sung by Ruangthong Thonglanthom)
- Saen huang (sung by Bussaya Rangsee)
- Sud Kha Neung (sung by herself)
