= Burapasilpin =

Award given by the Thai Ministry of Culture

- Awarded for: The deceased artist who created works that are known to society so that future generations will know the value of arts and culture
- Country: Thailand
- Presented by: Department of Cultural Promotion, Ministry of Culture
- First award: July 21, 2015; 11 years ago

Burapasilpin (Thai: บูรพศิลปิน) is an award given by the Thai Ministry of Culture to a deceased artist who has created works that are recognized by society. This name was bestowed by Her Royal Highness Princess Maha Chakri Sirindhorn.

== History ==
The Burapasilpin was first established in 2015 by the Department of Cultural Promotion at the Thai Ministry of Culture. In the first year, Burapasilpin were classified according to their eras, namely Sukhothai, Ayutthaya, Thonburi, and Rattanakosin. The levels of Burapasilpin were divided into 5 levels: king, royal family, Buddhist monks, nobles, and commoners, totaling 187 people, with Mom Rajawongse Chakrarot Chitphong as the chairman of the committee of experts.

Later in 2016, the era of the Burapasilpin was reduced to only Rattanakosin and divided into 3 branches: literature, visual arts, and performing arts, totaling 241 people: performing arts, 137 people; literary arts, 49 people; and visual arts, 55 people.

== Notable Burapasilpin ==
=== Performing arts ===
- Prince Anusorn Mongkolkarn
- Charoenchai Sundaravadin
- Eua Sunthornsanan
- Lor Tok
- Luang Pradit Pairoh
- Mitr Chaibancha
- Montri Tramote
- Paiboon Butkhan
- Phra Chenduriyang
- Phraya Sanoduriyang
- Puangroi Apaiwong
- Somchai Asanachinda
- Suraphol Sombatcharoen
- Vichit Kounavudhi
