= Jakrapun Kornburiteerachote =

Thai singer (born 1968)

Jakrapun Kornburiteerachote จักรพันธ์ ครบุรีธีรโชติ
- Also known as: Got, Prince of Luk thung
- Born: Jakrapun Abkornburi (Thai: จักรพรรณ์ อาบครบุรี); 13 September 1968 (age 58); Khon Buri District, Nakhon Ratchasima Province, Thailand
- Genres: Pop; Luk thung
- Occupations: Singer; Actor
- Instrument: Voice
- Years active: 1990s–present
- Label: GMM Grammy (1990-1994) Grammy Gold (1995-2020)

Jakrapun Kornburiteerachote (Thai: จักรพันธ์ ครบุรีธีรโชติ) (born 13 September 1968), or stage name Got Jakrapun (ก๊อท จักรพันธ์, formerly ก๊อต จักรพรรณ์), is a famous Thai Luk thung singer. His alias is Prince of Luk thung (เจ้าชายลูกทุ่ง). He has many popular songs including Ruk Koon Ying Gwah Krai, Som Wung Nah Krub, Tan Kwarm Kid Teung, Jai Sah Ra Parb, Taung Mee Suk Wan etc.

== Early life ==
He was born in Nakhon Ratchasima. He is of partly American descent. His father was an American soldier and he has a Thai mother.

== Musical career ==
At age 19, after leaving his hometown, he ended up in Pattaya singing in a dining club. This is where the talent scout for GMM Grammy, Mr. Katearun Lertpipak, found him and realized that he has found a treasure for Grammy. Katearun asked him to record his singing for him, which Jakrapun did and sent to him. Mr.Katearun was impressed and went to Rewat Buddhinan of Grammy immediately. After Rewat listened to the tape, he left the recording session and headed for Pattaya to see him. Rewat brought him to Grammy to be cultured and prepared to be the wonderful singer and performer that he is today. Rewat told him that many years ago "you will be rank first luk thung music star", and as usual he was right. He always gave Rewat thanks and credit for who he is today.

== Discography ==
=== Studio albums ===
- 1992 : Shot (ช็อต)
- 1994 : Phraw Jai Mai Meuan Derm (เพราะใจไม่เหมือนเดิม)
- 1997 : Look Toong Thailand 1 - Ruk Koon Ying Gwah Krai (ลูกทุ่งไทยแลนด์ 1 รักคุณยิ่งกว่าใคร)
- 1998 : Look Toong Thailand 2 (ลูกทุ่งไทยแลนด์ 2)
- 2001 : Look Toong Thailand 3 (ลูกทุ่งไทยแลนด์ 3)
- 2003 : Jarern Jarern (เจริญ เจริญ)
- 2007 : Kau Tot Tee Kid Teung (ขอโทษ...ที่คิดถึง)
- 2009 : Koon OK Mai (คุณ OK ไหม)
- 2011 : Phet Tut Phet (เพชรตัดเพชร)

=== Cover albums ===
- 1990 : Mae Mai Pleng Thai (แม่ไม้เพลงไทย) project - covers of Suraphol Sombatcharoen's songs
- 1995-1996 : Hua Gaow Hua Wan 1-9 (หัวแก้วหัวแหวน) - covers of various and famous luk thung songs
- 1998 : Neung Nai Siam 1-3 (หนึ่งในสยาม) - covers of famous luk krung songs
- 2000 : Mon Pleng Suraphol 1-5 (มนต์เพลงสุรพล) - covers of Sombatcharoen's songs
- 2005 : Taen Kwarm Kid Teung 1-2 (แทนความคิดถึง) - 1 original song and covers of various and famous luk thung songs
- 2014 : Taen Kwarm Pook Pun 20 Pi Hua Gaow Hua Wan 9/1-2 (แทนความผูกพัน 20 ปี หัวแก้วหัวแหวน) - special luk thung cover album to celebrate the albums' 20 years anniversary

== Philanthropy ==
In 2018, he donated millions to the Siriraj Hospital and Chulabhorn Hospital.

In 2020, he donated financial aid to seven hospitals during the COVID-19 pandemic.
