= Suthep Wongkamhaeng =

Thai singer (1934–2020)

- สุเทพ วงศ์กำแหง
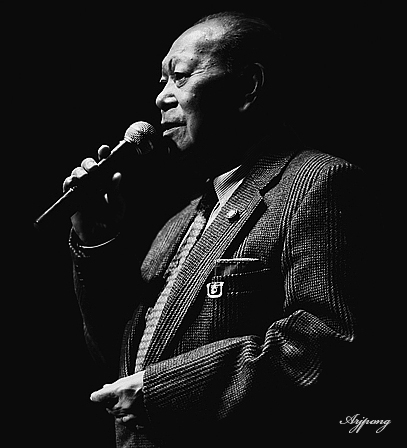
- Suthep in 2009
- Born: 12 May 1934; Sung Noen, Nakhon Ratchasima, Thailand
- Died: 27 February 2020 (aged 85); Bangkok, Thailand
- Occupations: Singer, columnist, politician
- Years active: 1953–1993
- Known for: Famous singer of luk krung music
- Spouse: Pussadee Anakkhamontree
- Children: Ritthikrai Wongkamhaeng

Suthep Wongkamhaeng (Thai: สุเทพ วงศ์กำแหง, 12 May 1934 – 27 February 2020) was a Thai singer, one of the most famous male singers of the luk krung genre of the 1950s. He made over 3,000 recordings over a career of forty years and was named National Artist in 1990. He also worked as a columnist and politician and briefly served in the Royal Thai Air Force, reaching the rank of pilot officer.

Born in Nakhon Ratchasima Province, Suthep trained as an artist but was soon introduced to the music industry; the hit song "Rak Khun Khao Laeo" brought him fame at the age of nineteen. Widely recognized for his smooth serenading voice, he has been described as "the Frank Sinatra of Thailand".

== Early life and rise to fame ==
Suthep Wongkamhaeng was born on 12 May 1934, in Sung Noen District of Nakhon Ratchasima Province. He lived in an extended family, his father having abandoned them before he was born. He attended school at Marie Vithaya, Wat Samo Rai, and Sikhiu Sawadphadungwitthaya schools in Nakhon Ratchasima, before undertaking vocational training in visual arts at the Poh Chang School of Arts in Bangkok, graduating in 1950.

Suthep worked as a sign painter for about two years after graduating, until a friend invited him to voice act in a radio play he was writing. He was then introduced to composer/songwriter Salai Krailert, and subsequently left the painting job to become Salai's apprentice. He began singing during play interludes, and became acquainted to several composers and songwriters, including Pruang Chuenprayoth, who offered Suthep his first recording opportunity with the song "Duangchai Thi Ro Khoi" (ดวงใจที่รอคอย, 'Awaited Sweetheart'), and Saman Kanchanaphalin and Sunthariya Na Wiangkan, who wrote "Rak Khun Khao Laeo" (รักคุณเข้าแล้ว, 'Falling in Love with You'), the hit song that propelled Suthep to national fame in 1954, at the age of nineteen.

== Career, later life and death ==
Suthep enjoyed a period of great popularity, during which he made many recordings and sang live for films, television, and stage productions. However, he soon reached the age of conscription in 1955. He joined the Royal Thai Air Force, and was assigned to the Music Division, with the rank of leading aircraftman. He served his two years of conscription mostly as a singer for the Air Force's military band, and was chosen as part of a cultural exchange delegation to the People's Republic of China in 1957. However, when Sarit Thanarat took power by coup shortly after their return, the delegates became accused of being Communist supporters, and Suthep had to flee to Japan, where he attended the Tokyo University of the Arts for three years before being allowed to return and resume his singing career.

In 1967, Suthep began writing as a columnist, first about the country's music scene for Fah Muang Thai magazine, then expanding in 1970 to write about politics for Thairath, Ban Muang, Siam Rath, and several other newspapers. When the 14 October 1973 uprising toppled the military government, he joined the New Force Party and stood for election in Bangkok's Phaya Thai District and later in his hometown, but failed to be elected both times. Following the suspension of parliament during the military government of 1976, he again stood for election in 1979, and was elected to the House of Representatives, representing Nakhon Ratchasima. He failed to be re-elected in 1983, but joined the Palang Dharma Party and successfully stood for election in 1988, representing Bangkok until the 1991 coup, after which he retired from politics.

In his personal life, Suthep married Pussadee (née Anakkhamontree) in 1967. They had one son, Ritthikrai.

Suthep remained active into his 80s, when his health deteriorated. He had a stroke in early 2019, and was admitted to Siriraj Hospital for over a month due to a blood infection. He died at home in Bangkok on 27 February 2020, aged 85.

== Works and recognition ==
Suthep made over 3,000 recordings of songs (5,000 by some counts) by 138 different writers over a career spanning forty years, from 1953 to 1993. He was the best known male singer (outside of the Suntaraporn band) of luk krung or 'urban music', a genre highly influenced by big band jazz, and has been called the "king of luk krung" and "the Frank Sinatra of Thailand". In addition to "Rak Khun Khao Laeo", other well known songs performed by him include "Luk Kamphra" (ลูกกำพร้า, 'Orphan'), "Phit Thang Rak" (ผิดทางรัก, 'Wrong Way to Love'), "Thoe Yu Nai" (เธออยู่ไหน, 'Where Are You?'), and "Botrian Kon Wiwa" (บทเรียนก่อนวิวาห์, 'Lesson Before the Wedding'). His style of singing earned him reputation as a crooner; writer Rong Wongsawan once described his voice as smooth like "silk rubbed against beer foam". He also had acting roles in several films, and sang the title songs for many. In his retirement, he served as president of the Singers Association of Thailand.

As recognition of his contributions to the genre, Suthep was named a National Artist in performing arts (modern Thai music) in 1990. Other honours he received include five royal Golden Record awards, two Golden Radio awards, and an honorary doctorate from Ramkhamhaeng University in 2000. He was granted the military rank of pilot officer in 2005.
