= Phraiwan Lukphet =

Thai Luk thung singer

Phraiwan Lukphet ไพรวัลย์ ลูกเพชร
- Born: Somnuek Nilkhieaw; 14 December 1941; Phetchaburi, Thailand
- Died: 11 October 2002 (aged 60)
- Genres: Luk Thung
- Occupation: Singer
- Years active: 1950s–2002

Somnuek Nilkhieaw (Thai: สมนึก นีลเขียว), known as Phraiwan Lukphet (Thai: ไพรวัลย์ ลูกเพชร), was a Thai Luk thung singer.

== Early life ==
Phraiwan was born on 14 December 1941 in Phetchaburi Province. He started his career on stage thanks to his parents, who encouraged him to join the band called "Mueng Phet".

== Career ==
He later switched to the group Bangkok Cha Cha Cha.

When Bangkok Cha Cha Cha split up, Phraiwan worked with singer, Suraphol Sombatcharoen. Suraphol started composing music for Phraiwan, ultimately contributing to his success and popularity. Phraiwan's notable works include "Sam Ruay Luem Kham", "Nirat Rak Nakhornprathom", "Klin Toob Sukhothai" and "Nao Jai Thee Chai Daen".

== Death ==
In 1985, while he was driving his car, he was shot. The bullet went through his neck, which resulted in a spinal fracture and paralysis. He continued to perform for years. He died on 17 October 2002.
