= Pitthaya Boonyarattaphan =

Thai luk krung singer(1933–2010)

Pitthaya Boonyarattaphan พิทยา บุณยรัตพันธุ์
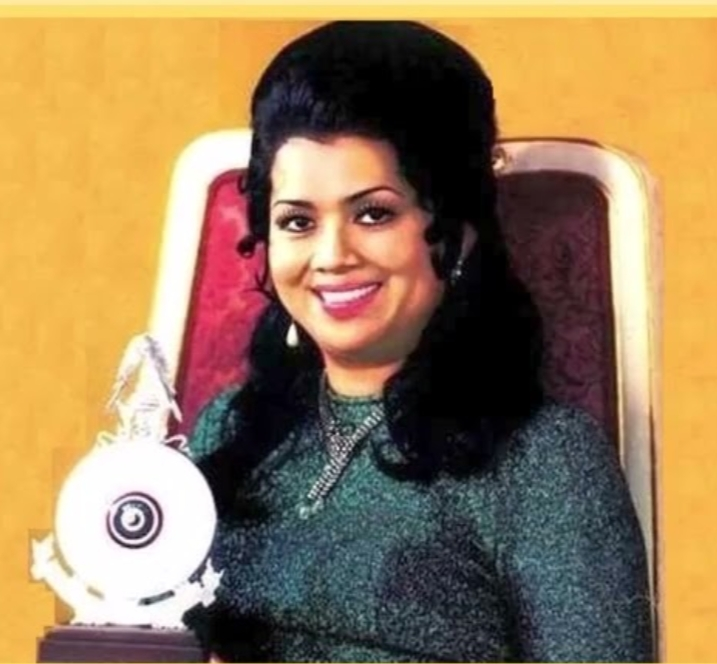

Background information
- Born: July 25, 1933; Thonburi, Siam
- Died: April 14, 2010 (aged 76)
- Genre: Luk Krung
- Instrument: Vocals
- Years active: 1952–2010

Pitthaya Boonyarattaphan (Thai: พิทยา บุณยรัตพันธุ์; RTGS: Pitaya Bunrayataphan (July 25, 1933 – April 14, 2010); was a Thai luk krung singer and was one of the singers of the Suntaraporn Band. She was famous for the song Jup Thai: จูบ, which got covered by Illslick, a famous Thai singer.

== Life and career ==
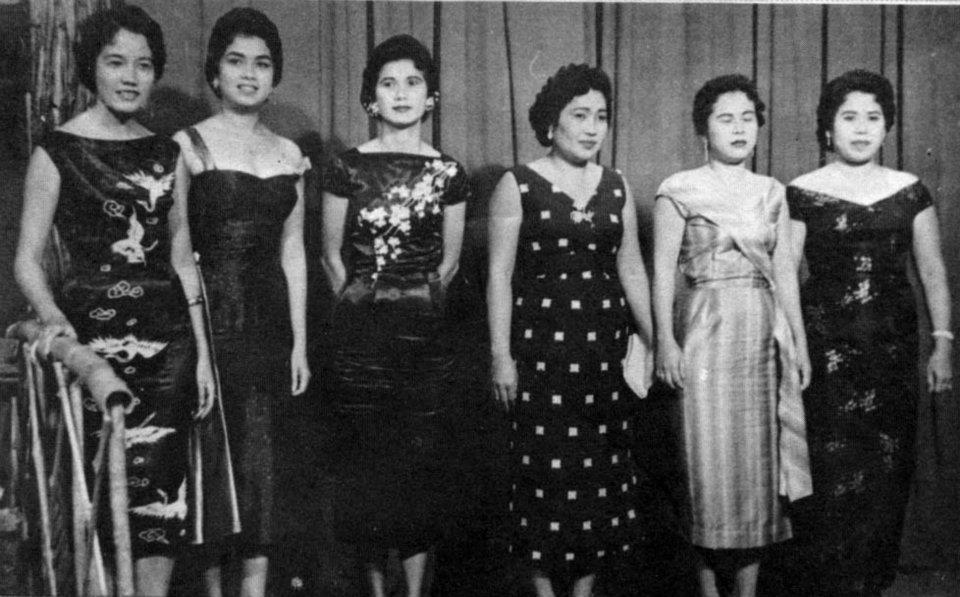
Suntaraporn Band 20th anniversary, Pittaya is on the 2nd left

Pittaya Boonyarattaphan was born on July 25, 1933, in Thonburi, Siam. She finished 9th grade at Satri Watrakang School. When she was studying in Suankularb Wittayalai School, she got a role in an acting show as Hermia in A Midsummer Night's Dream by Prem Purachatra, but she decided to study English rather than studying on acting class.

In 1952, she joined and was the one of the singers in the Suntaraporn Band and made the first song Jai Sao which sang by Surat Pukkavet and the tonals by Eua Sunthornsanan. She got out of the band 2 years later and joined another band called Prasanmitr Band and made another song called Sao Sa-eun which the tonals were made by Ves Sunthornjamorn.

Pittaya gained popularity by the song Jup which was written and tonals by Suraphol Tonawanich and the song Kanueng Ha which got a Royal Golden Record Award in 1971.

Pittaya got Paralysis and rested at her home for more than ten years, and passed away on April 14, 2010, on 4:00am at the age of 76. She was cremated at Wat Hua Lamphong on April 19, 2010.
