= Sornkhiri Sriprachuap =

Thai singer (b. 1935, d. 1972)

- ศรคีรี ศรีประจวบ
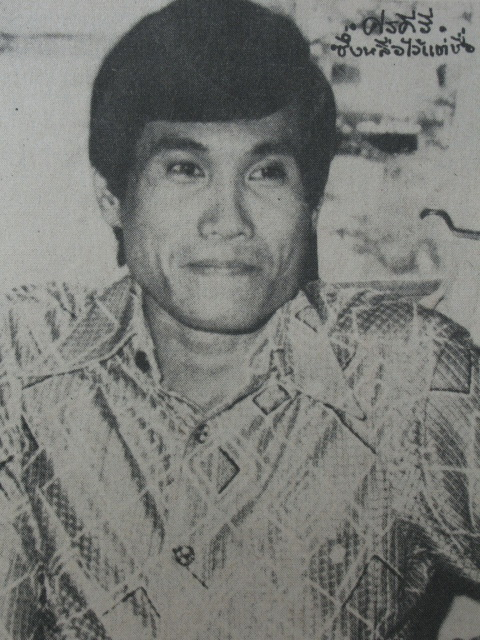
- Born: Sornchai Thong-prasong; 4 March 1946; Bang Khonthi, Samut Songkhram, Thailand
- Died: 30 January 1972 (aged 25); Phichai, Uttaradit, Thailand
- Occupation: Luk thung singer

Sornkhiri Sriprachuap (Thai: ศรคีรี ศรีประจวบ; 4 March 1946 – 30 January 1972) was a Thai Luk thung singer.

== Biography ==
Sornkhiri has real name Sornchai Thongprasong was born at Ban Nong-or, Bang Krabue subdistrict of Bang Khonthi District of Samut Songkhram Province. He was the youngest of six siblings go his father, Mang, and his mother, Chuea. He graduated from Prathomsuksa 4 at Phromsawat Sathorn School. After graduating, he worked with his mother. During breaks, he sang the popular songs "Chai Sam Bot" and "Tiger Repentant" of Khamron Samboonnanon.

Sornkhiri applied twice to be a singer in the "Mukdapan" band of Kru Payong Mukda (who later became 1991 National Artist Performing Arts) 2 times, but was turned down.

After a brief time living as a monk, he went to work on a pineapple plantation in Prachuap Khiri Khan province. Here, he reinvigorated his love of singing and began entering singing contests at temple fairs and events. One of his friends, Payong Wongsumpun, invited him to join a band that hired teachers from the Thanarat Camp to teach for fun in the village. Sornkhiri later formed a band called "Total Teen Stars", that later changed their name to "Ruam Dao Muang Pran". The band accepted general shows at homes in exchange for pineapples.

At that time, Sornkhiri sang a dance song style and used the name "Phanom Noi" because he sang songs of Phanom Nopporn and Sakchay Wanchai style. Later, he brought the band to perform at the New Year of the province, "Prayhad Samanmitr", the governor of Prachuap Khiri Khan at that time listening to the voice and seeing the face, he fell in love with it, so he changed his name to "Sornkhiri Sriprachuap" from that moment on. Later, he deposited himself as a disciple of Kru Paiboon Butkhan, who Kru Paiboon composed 4 songs out of a total of 6 songs for Sornkhiri in the first album such as: "Nam Toum" (น้ำท่วม), "Bupphesanniwat", "Maekha Ta Kom" (แม่ค้าตาคม) and "Wassana Pee Noi", in addition other 2 songs was, "Enough or Not" (พอหรือยัง), the first song from nib of Kru Chollathee Tharnthong, and "Bang Chang", which Sornkhiri performed his own compositions and melodies.
