= Ban Muang =

Ban Muang can refer to:

- Ban Mueang, King of Sukhothai
- Ban Muang District in Sakon Nakhon Province, Thailand
- Ban Muang (newspaper), a daily newspaper in Thai
- Ban Muang, the name of hundreds of localities in Thailand, including:
  - Ban Muang, a tambon of Ban Pong District, Ratchaburi Province, Thailand
