= Winai =

Winai (Thai: วินัย, from Pali/Sanskrit vinaya) is a Thai masculine given name. Notable people with the name include:

- Winai Chulabutsapa (1922–1999), Thai singer
- Winai Dahlan (born 1952), Thai scientist
- Winai Kraibutr (1969–2024), Thai actor
- Winai Senniam (1958–2009), Thai politician
