= Sangthong Seesai =

Thai luk thung singer and actor (1948–1984)

Sangthong Seesai สังข์ทอง สีใส
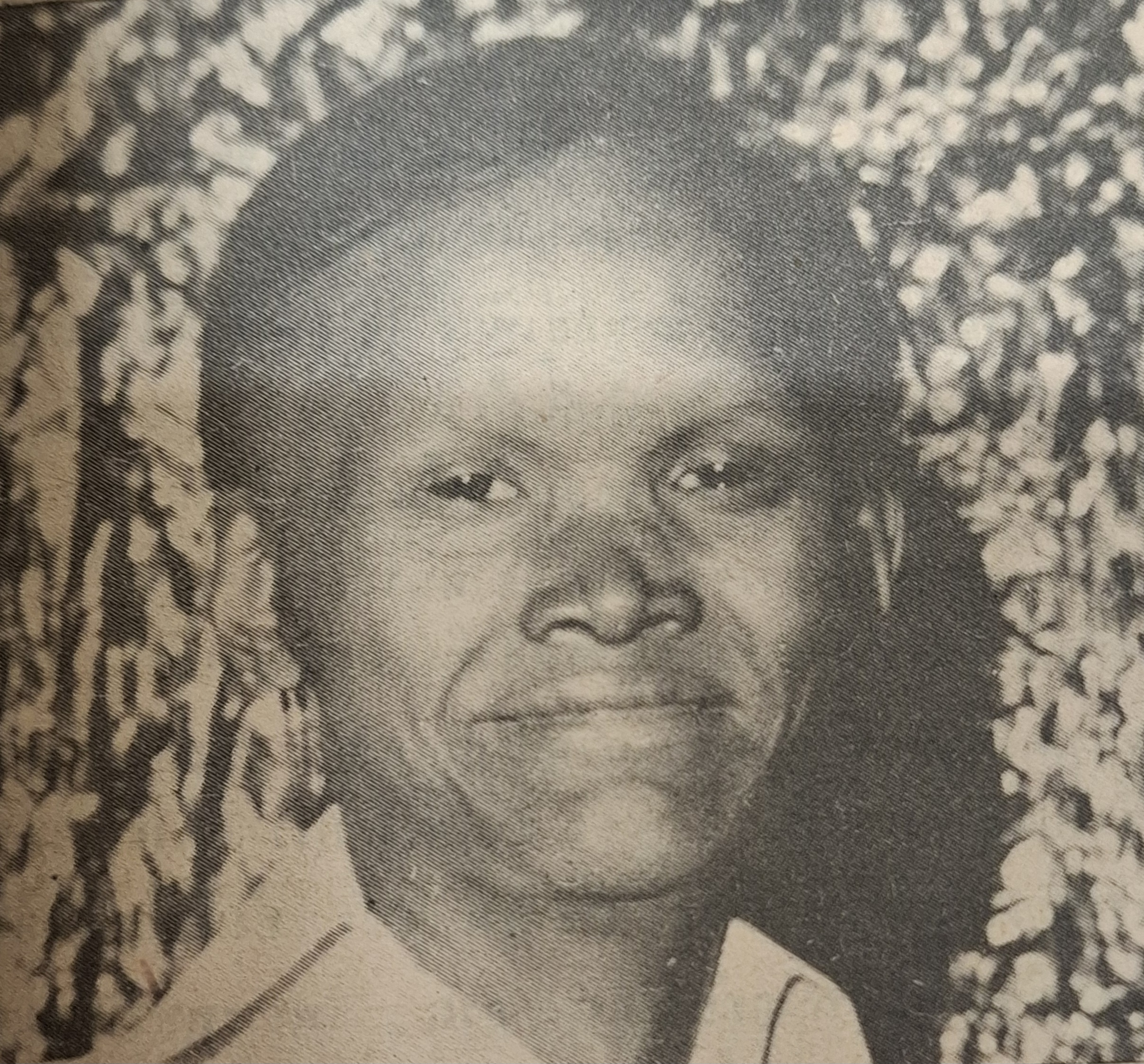

Background information
- Born: Pieak Sihera; March 19, 1948; Suphan Buri Province, Thailand
- Died: January 22, 1984 (aged 35)
- Genres: Luk thung
- Occupations: Singer; actor
- Instrument: Vocal
- Years active: 1970–1984

Sangthong Seesai (Thai: สังข์ทอง สีใส, RTGS: Sangtong Sisai); (19 March 1948 – 22 January 1984) was a famous Thai Luk thung singer. He was popularized by songs "Num For Loe Fiew", "Tone", "Ning Nong", and "Oak Oun". His alias was เทพบุตรหน้าผี (Thephabut Na Phee;lit. 'Ghost-faced deity'). He died in 1984 by road accident, but his death is enigmatic up to date.

== Early life ==
His birth name was Pieak Sihera. He was born on 13 March 1948, in U Thong District, Suphan Buri Province. He had ectodermal dysplasia during his young life and had a job as a spokesman or magic man in a Buddhist Festival.

=== Career and entertainers ===
He became a singer in Chula Rat Luk thung band. Mongkhol Amadhayakul, manager of Chula Rat Luk thung band named him "Sangthong Seesai". He started gaining popularity after recording his first song, "Oak Oun" (Thai: อกอุ่น). After that, he recorded his most popular songs including "Ning Nong", and "Nao Lom Hom Rak". In 1970, he was an actor in the film Tone (Thai: โทน), and hence he became very popular on stage as a musician and an actor. He also recorded soundtrack music for films. He had soundtrack music sung by The Impossibles,

=== Prison ===
He was sentenced to attempted murder, because he wasn't suspend chaos in his tour concert. He was sentenced to prison for many years. In his prison life he recorded songs including "Rak Kham Gampheang" and "Sang Tong Talang Kan". He was imprisoned in jail for 4 years 7 months. After he was released from jail, he restarted his career as an entertainer again.

He died on 22 January 1984 in a road accident.

== Personal life ==
He was married to Chanthana Srihera and had a son named Surat Sihera. His younger brother is Suthep Seesai also a famous comedian as well.

== In modern culture ==
After his death, his song, "Num Foe Loe Fieaw" was sung by many Li Kae bands and Comedy groups. And in 2015, "Num Foe Loe Fieaw" was adapted and renamed "Wean Foe Loe Fieaw" by Jazz Chuanchuen with Sakuntala Tieanphairoat, Sam Bat Ha Sip Band and Kohtee Aramboy.

== Partial discography ==
- Oak Oun (อกอุ่น)
- Ning Nong (นิ้งหน่อง)
- Kid Tueng Ban Kied (คิดถึงบ้านเกิด)
- Tone (โทน)
- Ma Rak Khan Dee Kwa (มารักกันดีกว่า)
- Rak Kham Kam Paeng (รักข้ามกำแพง)
- Klab Ma Tham Mai (กลับมาทำไม)
- Ya Bon (อย่าบอน)
- Num Foe Loe Fieaw (หนุ่มฟ้อหล่อเฟี้ยว)
