= Pongsri Woranuch =

Thai musician (1939–2025)

Pongsri Woranuch ผ่องศรี วรนุช
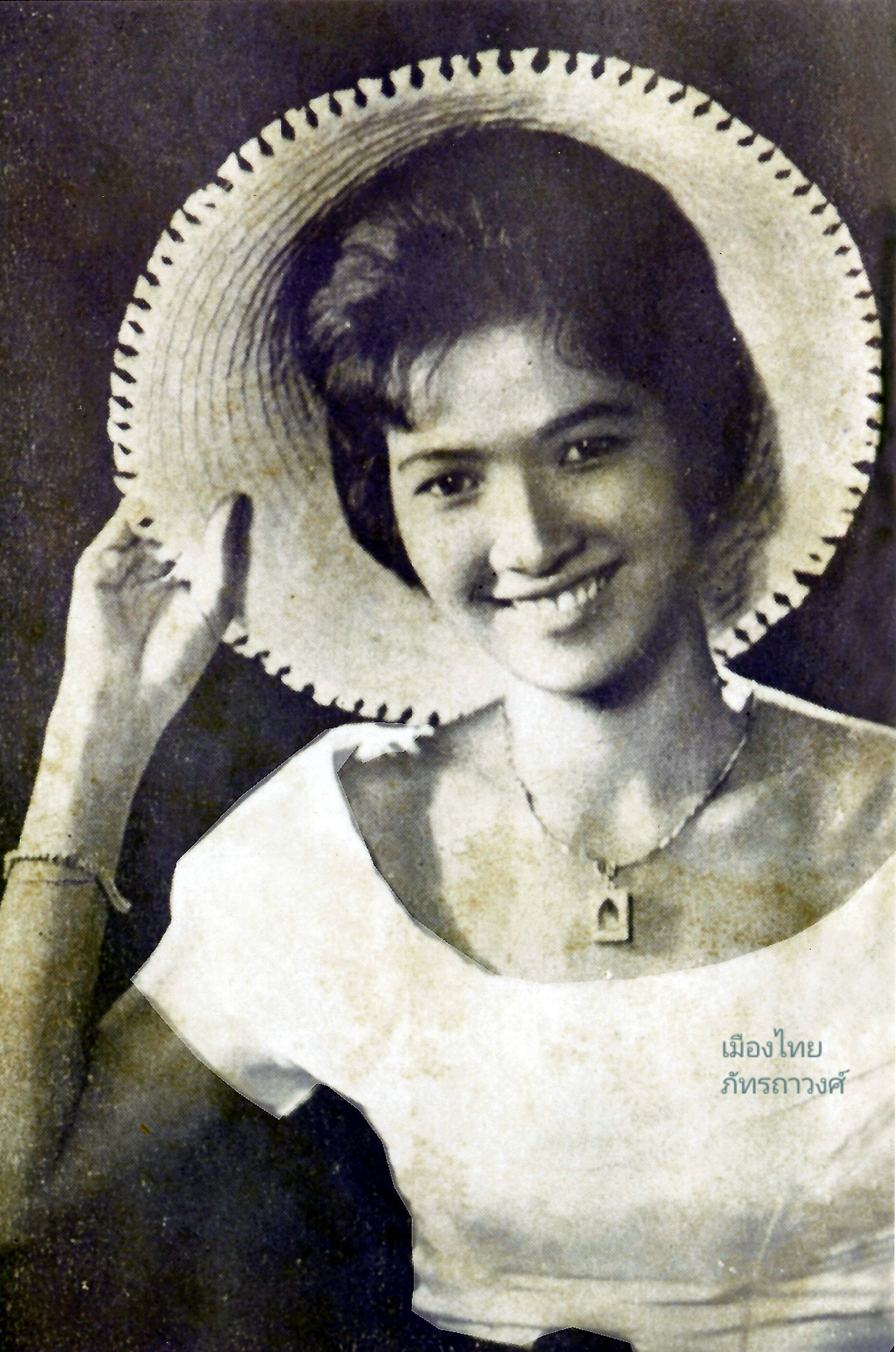

Background information
- Born: 5 June 1939; Manorom, Chai Nat province, Siam
- Died: 6 April 2025 (aged 85) Bangkok, Thailand
- Genres: Luk thung
- Occupation: Singer

Pongsri Woranuch (Thai: ผ่องศรี วรนุช, RTGS: Phongsi Woranut; 5 June 1939 – 6 April 2025) was a Thai singer. She first became a star in the 1950s with the orchestra of Suraphol Sombatcharoen, practicing music in the style of luk thung. Soon she became the first singer to be called "queen of luk thung". Woranuch melded the style of traditional Thai folk music to music from outside the region, including various genres of East Asian music, Latin American music, and American country music and film music. Alongside Suraphon Sombatjalern, she is considered one of the most important of this genre's practitioners. In 1992, she became the second luk thung artist awarded the title of Thai National Artist. She died from lung disease at her residence in Bangkok, on 6 April 2025, at the age of 85.
