= Mahori =

Classical Thai musical ensemble

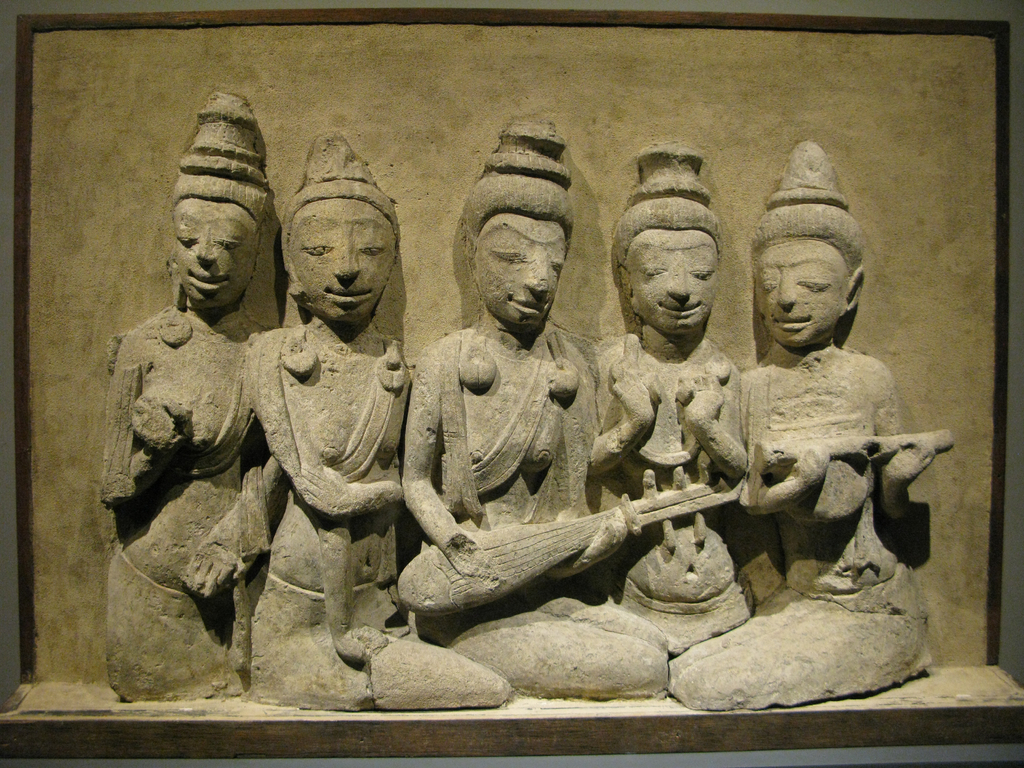
Stucco relief found at Khu Bua archaeological site. 650-700 C.E., Dvaravati culture.

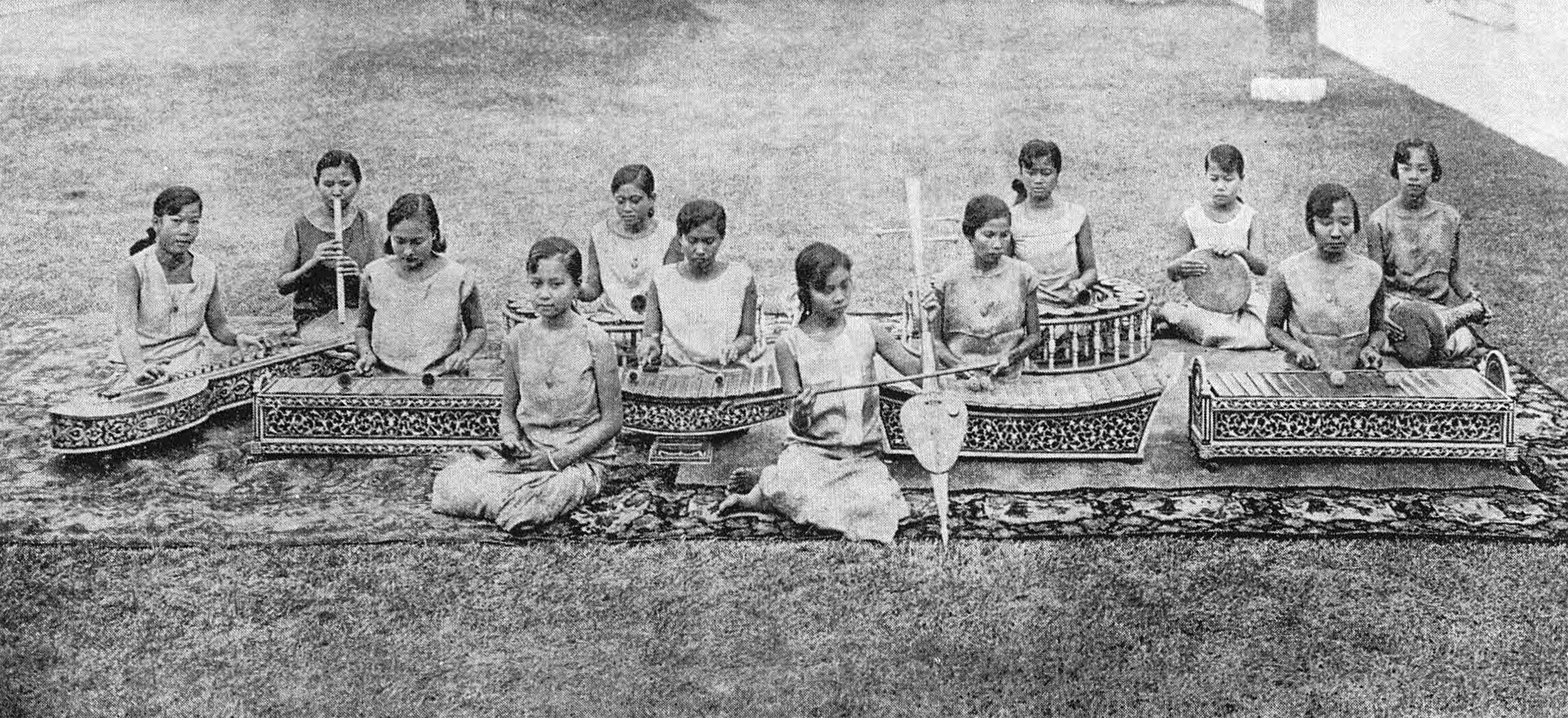
Mahori Khrueang Yai

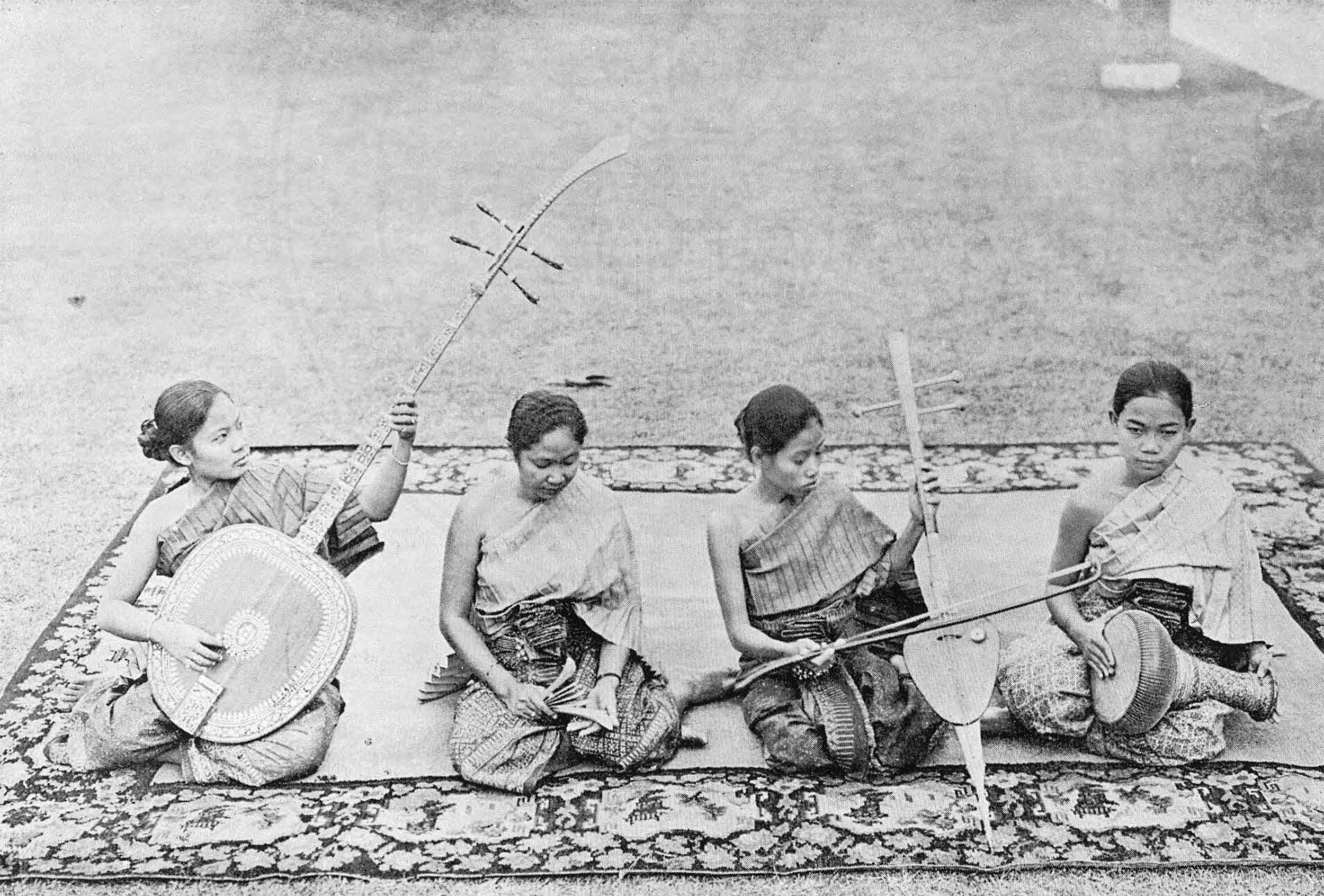
Mahori Khrueang Si

The mahori (Thai: มโหรี), possibly from Sanskrit मनोहर (manohara, meaning "fascinating, attractive, charming, beautiful") + -ई (-ī, a feminine suffix), is a form of Thai classical ensemble traditionally played in the royal courts for the purpose of secular entertainment. It combines the xylophones and gong circles (but not the pi, or oboe) of the piphat with the strings of the khruang sai ensemble. Originally, the term referred only to a string ensemble, although today it includes both string and percussion. There are three broad types of Mahori: Mahori Khryang Lek, Mahori Khyrang Khu, and Mahori Khyrang Yai, each differentiated by the types of instruments utilized. It is comparable to the Cambodian mohaori ensemble.

== History ==
Mahori is a form of Thai classical music that has a long history in Thailand, dating back to at least the Ayutthaya period. Although it was already a well-established form of music in Thailand during that time, in 1931, Prince Damrong, the author of the History of Thai Music had asserted that the Thai mahori was of Khmer origin and created by the ancient Khmer and later adopted and elaborated in Thai society. However, historical records indicate that the mahori music "Say Samon" (later called "Sansoen Phra Narai") was already recorded in the Du Royaume de Siam in 1687 by Simon de La Loubère, a French envoy who visited Ayutthaya at that time. And also, Nicolas Gervaise, a French priest and traveler who had visited Ayutthaya, recorded a Mahori music called "Sout Chai" in the book Histoire Naturelle et Politique du Royaume de Siam in 1688.

Initially, only men were permitted to play mahori; however, as its popularity grew, women from royal backgrounds began to play as well. In the Ayuthaya period, women were not permitted to act onstage outside royal service, and women were trained only to play in the mahori. However, King Rama IV removed this restriction and allowed women to act onstage, which caused women's mahori to decline as women increasingly chose to act instead.

Traditionally, the ensemble consisted of four players: the krajappi, a saw sam si, a thone, and a singer.

The Wong Mahori consists of both the string and piphat instruments, often reduced in size to accommodate female performers.

While Thai classical music was somewhat discouraged as being outmoded and backward-looking during Thailand's aggressively nationalistic modernization policies of the mid-twentieth century, the classical arts have benefited recently from increased governmental sponsorship and funding as well as popular interest as expressed in such films as Homrong: The Overture (2003), a popular fictionalized biography of a famous early 20th century ranat ek player and composer Luang Pradit Phairao.

== See also ==
- Mohaori
- piphat
- khruang sai
- Music of Thailand
- Music of Cambodia
