= Thon and rammana =

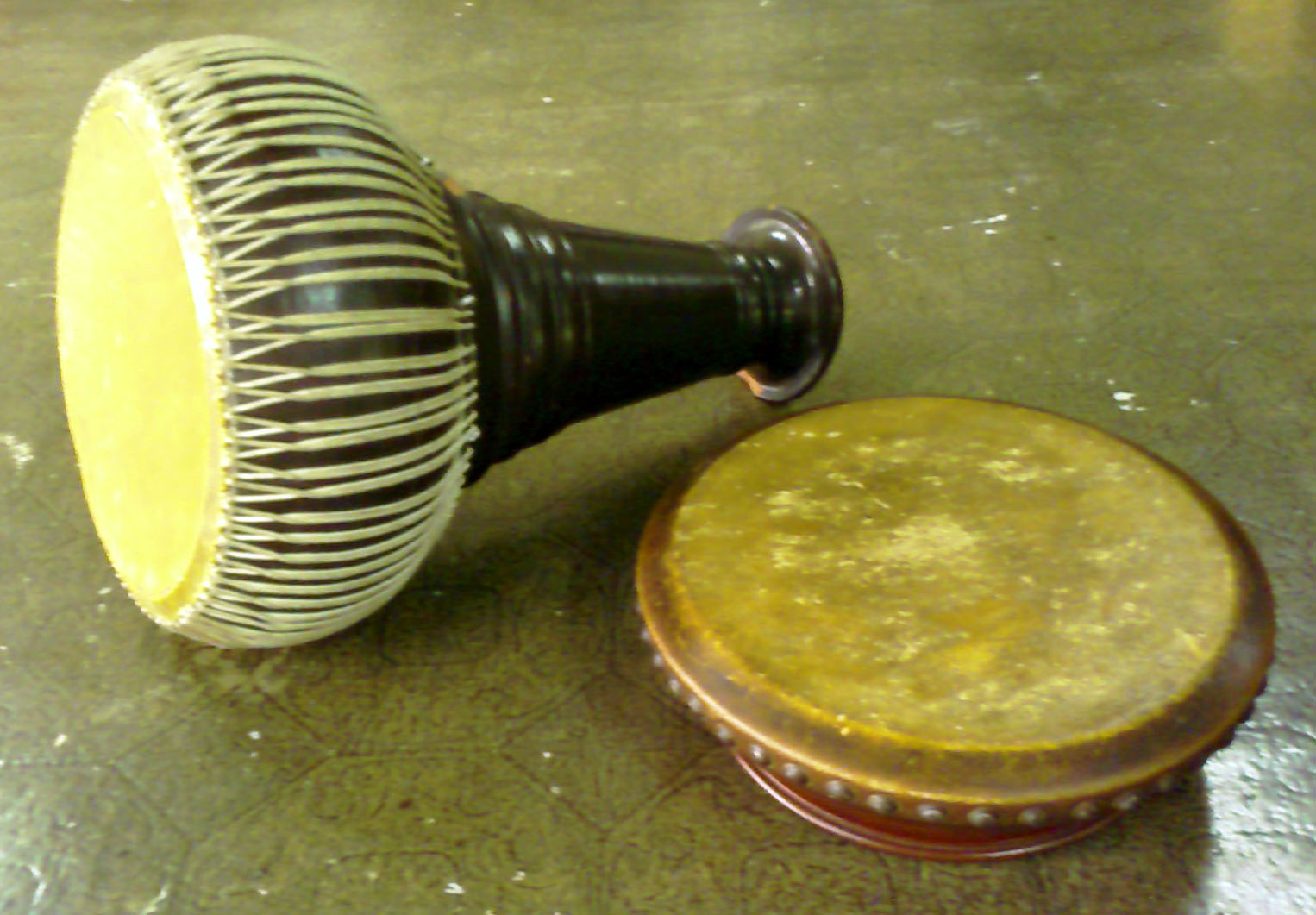
- A thon (left) and rammana (right)
- Classification: Percussion (Membranophone)

The thon and rammana (Khmer: ស្គរថូននិងស្គររមនា; Thai: โทนรำมะนา, pronounced [tʰoːn ram.ma.naː]) are hand drums played as a pair in Khmer and Thai classical music. It consists of two drums: the thon (Khmer: ស្គរថូន;Thai: โทน), a goblet drum with a ceramic or wooden body and the rammana (Khmer: ស្គររមនា;Thai: รำมะนา), a small rebana-typed frame drum or tambourine. They are used usually in the Mohaori ensemble in Cambodia and khruang sai ensemble in Thailand. The thon gives a low pitch and the rammana gives a high pitch. Earlier in the 20th century, the thon and rammana were sometimes played separately.

== See also ==
- Skor daey, article compares Cambodian goblet drums
- Traditional Thai musical instruments
- Cambodian folk and classical music, mohori
