= Khrueang sai =

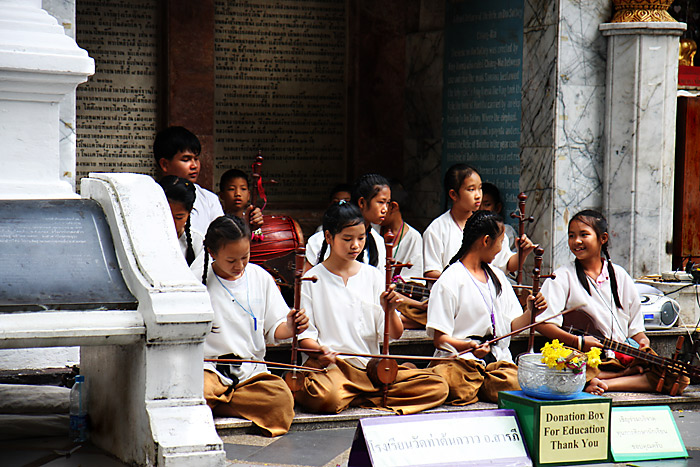
Schoolgirls and boys playing khrueang sai in front of a temple

Wong khrueang sai (Thai: วงเครื่องสาย, pronounced [woŋ kʰrɯ̂əŋ sǎːj], literally "string ensemble") is a musical ensemble in Thai classical music which consists primarily of string instruments. A typical khrueang sai ensemble features two two-string fiddles, one high and one low (saw duang and saw u), a three-string zither called jakhe, a vertical duct flute called khlui, hand drums, and various cymbals. Depending on the size of the ensemble, instruments may be doubled or left out. A three-string spike fiddle called saw sam sai may be added as well. The khim (hammered dulcimer) has become popular and is also used in this ensemble. In the 20th century, Western instruments such as the violin or organ have also occasionally been integrated into khrueang sai ensembles.

== Playing context ==
The khrueang sai is one of the quietest and most intimate ensembles in Thai classical music. It is used to accompany singing, dances, and holidays. It also used in impromptu occasions requiring music.

== Varieties ==
The following are some of the ensemble types, depending on the occasion:

- Khrueang sai wong lek
- Khrueang sai khrueang khu
- Khrueang sai pi chawa
- Khrueang sai prasom

Here is the definition of the khrueang sai according to the NIU South East Asia Studies department:

Wong Khryang Sai (Khryang Sai = String ensemble): The String ensemble consists of saw-duang, saw-u, Jakhae, Khlui, and the set of percussion instruments: Ching, Chab, Thone-Ram Mana and Mong. This ensemble is further divided into four kinds in accordance with its size and different instruments as shown above.

Sound clips are available at the website above for all Thai ensembles.

== Types of wong khrueang sai ==
=== Khrueang sai diao ===
Wong khrueang sai diao (Thai: วงเครื่องสายเดี่ยว) is an ensemble consisting of one each of the following instruments:

1. ching - timekeeper of ensemble
2. saw duang
3. saw u
4. khlui
5. thon and rammana - secondary timekeeper
6. jakhe

This kind of ensemble is used when there is limit of space. It is also called wong khrueang sai wong lek (Thai: วงเครื่องสายวงเล็ก) or wong khrueang sai khurang diao (วงเครื่องสายเครื่องเดี่ยว).

=== Khrueang sai khu ===
Wong khrueang sai khu (Thai: วงเครื่องสายคู่) is an ensemble consisting of instruments as described in the khrueang sai diao ensemble, but double in number (except ching, thon, and rammana). It is also called wong khrueang sai wong yai (วงเครื่องสายวงใหญ่).

=== Khrueang sai prasom ===
Wong khrueang sai prasom (Thai: วงเครื่องสายประสม หรือ วงเครื่องสายผสม) is an ensemble arranged by mixing khrueang sai diao or khrueang sai khu with other instruments, such as organ, ranad ek, khim and also mixed with the piphat ensemble to create new ensemble called khrueang sai prasom piphat (เครื่องสายประสมปี่พาทย์).

=== Khrueang sai pi chawa ===
Wong khrueang sai pi chawa (Thai: วงเครื่องสายปี่ชวา) is an ensemble arranged by adding pi chawa (ปี่ชวา), glong khaek (กลองแขก), and krap (กรับ) to the wong khrueang sai diao. It is usually played in funeral ceremonies.

== See also ==
- Piphat
- Mahori
- Music of Thailand
