= Paiboon Butkhan =

Thai composer, playwright, and screenwriter

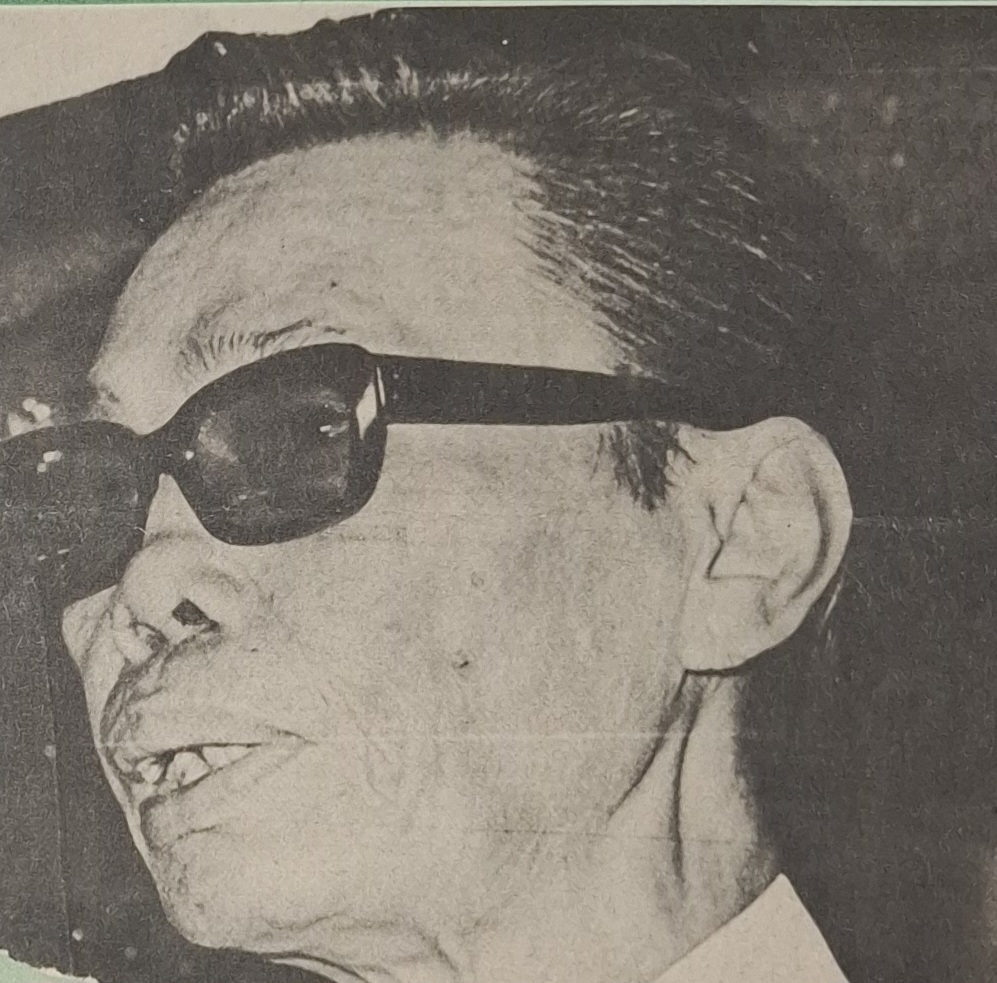
- Born: Paiboon Praneet; 4 September 1918; Pathum Thani province
- Died: 29 August 1972 (aged 53); Metropolitan Bangkok Thonburi
- Occupations: Songwriters, playwright, film screenplay
- Spouse: Duangduan Butkhan (1968-1972)

Paiboon Butkhan (Thai: ไพบูลย์ บุตรขัน; 4 September 1918 - 29 August 1972) was a Thai composer, playwright, and screenwriter with many famous works. He would eventually be dubbed, "The number one genius composer in Thailand" and be honored as Burapasilpin in the performing arts category in 2015.

== Biography ==
Kru Paiboon Butkhan, whose former name was Paiboon Praneet, was born at Ban Thong Khung, Chiang Rak Yai Subdistrict, Sam Khok District, Pathum Thani Province. He was the son of Mr. But and Mrs. Prom Praneet. His was from a poor farming family and had three siblings. When he was 6 years old, his father died, so he was raised by Mr. Jane Butkhan, who was his uncle and brought him came to Pathum Wan district, Phra Nakhon Province and changed his surname from Praneet to Butkhan.

Kru Paiboon started primary school education in Pathum Thani Province, secondary school at Satree Pathumwan School and study until the end of Grade 8 at Sawat Amnuaywet School, Bangkok. Learned more music from Kru Phin Prongkaewngam around 1933-1935 and learned more music and international music notation at YMCA association on Worachak Road and has used music scores to compose songs every time since then.

After graduating, Kru Paiboon Butkhan worked as a Thai language teacher at Kuang Siew School, then resigned to work as an electrician at Samsen Power Plant, then resigned again to work with the drama troupe, the Mae Kaew troupe and the Chantha-ropas troupe, acted as the writing radio plays and composing songs.

Kru Paiboon Butkhan's song started had recording the platter around 1947 by the induction of Sawasdee-phab Bunnag, who was a friend and younger brother-in-law. There are many songs by Kru Phaiboon that have received awards "Royal Golden Gramophone".

"Klin Klone Sarb Kwai" (กลิ่นโคลนสาบควาย, composed in 1953, sung by Chan Yenkae) is another important piece of Kru Paiboon Butkhan's work that the Thai government had banned during the communist crackdown. Even though it was prohibited by the government, the more it was banned, the more listeners bought the platters to listen to. This song is also regarded as the foundation of Luk thung because in the past before 1957, Thai songs were not clearly divided into Luk krung and Luk thung until 1964.

After passed away for 17 years in September 1989, the song of Kru Paiboon received a Royal Awards at the 1st time Mid-Century Thai Luk Thung Festival for 10 songs and at the 2nd time Mid-Century Thai Luk Thung Festival in 1991, another 1 song.

== Personal life ==
Since his youth, Kru Paiboon Butkhan has been suffering from leprosy and has no money for serious treatment. Kru Paiboon kept to himself and remained aloof from society. He was closely cared for by his mother, Mrs. Prom Praneet, until her death in 1965. However, he received help from friends who took him to get treatment until he was completely cured, but he was still physically disabled. Later, he fell ill again and used drugs to relieve his symptoms. He entered treatment at Tham Krabok Monastery until he was completely cured in 1959.
