= Puangroi Apaiwong =

Thai composer

Thanpuying Puangroi Apaiwong (December 28, 1914 – August 17, 2000; Thai: ท่านผู้หญิงพวงร้อย อภัยวงศ์) was a Thai composer, thought to be the first woman composer in Thailand. Her song "Bua Kao" ("White Lotus") is a widely recognized classic in Thailand.

== Biography ==
Thanpuying Puangroi Apaiwong was born Mom Luang Puangroi Sanitwong in Bangkok in 1914. As a young girl, she learned to play guitar and piano. After graduating from the Wattana Wittaya Academy in 1934, she attended Trinity College London, where she studied music.

Apaiwong is considered the first Thai woman composer, gaining prominence for her work in the Phleng Thai sakon genre, which combined Western notation and instruments with traditional Thai musical styles. She composed more than 100 pieces over the course of her career. She is best known for the song "Bua Kao" ("White Lotus"), which she wrote in the late 1930s for the soundtrack of the film The Old Flame. The song went on to become a widely recognized classic in Thailand, and UNESCO honored it as a "Song of Asia" in 1979.

As a composer, Apaiwong wrote songs for plays and later film soundtracks. She also was commissioned to produce compositions for the Thai royal family and would receive five royal decorations. She was named a National Artist of Thailand for musical performance by the Board of National Culture in 1986. In addition to her composing, she taught Western classical music.

She died in 2000, at age 85.
