= Somchai Asanachinda =

Thai actor (1922–1993)

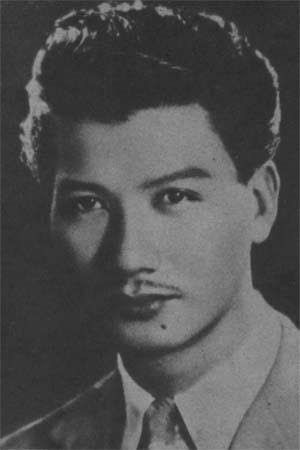
- Born: November 16, 1921
- Died: September 19, 1993 (aged 71)
- Occupations: Actor, journalist, screenwriter, director, film producer
- Years active: 1949–1993

Somchai Asanachinda, also known as So Asanachinda and S. Asanachinda, (16 November 1921 – 19 September 1993) was a Thai actor, journalist, screenwriter, director, and film producer.

== Death ==
S. Asanachinda died on September 19, 1993, from emphysema caused by smoking. The royal cremation ceremony was held on February 6, 1994, at Wat Makutkasatriyaram Ratchaworawihan.
