= Klong yao =

Thai and Lao traditional long drum

Klong yao (Thai: กลองยาว, pronounced [klɔːŋ jaːw]), also known as the Khawng yao in Laos, is a type of traditional long drum used in Thailand and Laos. It is generally slung over the shoulder and played with the hands, but can also be played sat down. Drums have a wooden body and a drumhead made from water buffalo skin, and usually are decorated with a colorful skirt. It is played in many festival parades in Thailand. Extremely large klong yao, which may be up to 10 m in length, are sometimes encountered in parades, where they are carried by truck.

Similar drums are used by the Dai people of the Yunnan province of southwest China, as well as in Burma. It is the equivalent of the Cambodian skor chhaiyam.

== See also ==
- Traditional Thai musical instruments
