= Winai Chulabutsapa =

Thai musician

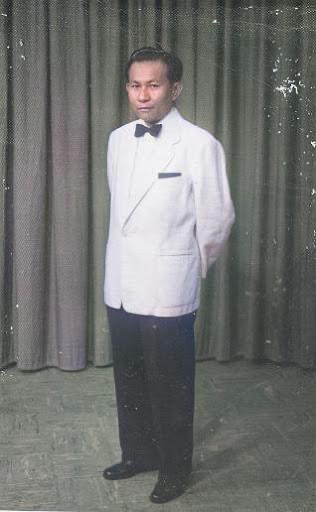
- Winai Chulabutsapa's photograph during the 1940s - 1950s.
- Born: Wathana Chulabutsapa (วัฒนา จุลละบุษปะ); June 12th 1922; Pranakorn Province, Siam
- Died: September 14th 1999; Bangkok, Thailand
- Other names: The King of Tango
- Occupations: Lead Singer, Singer, Band Leader.
- Years active: 1942 - 1999
- Organization(s): Suntaraporn band, The Public Relations Department band.
- Notable work: Yen Lom Wao, Phrom Likit, Dao Lom Duean, Floor Fueang Fah.
- Title: The Thai King of Tango

Winai Chulabutsapa (Thai: วินัย จุลละบุษปะ, RTGS: Winai Chunlabutsapa; June 12, 1922 - September 14, 1999) was a lead singer of the Suntaraporn band, leader of The Public Relations Department band and Sangkheetsamphant band. He was well known for his songs which are mostly sung in Tango Rhythms until he got the famous nickname "The King of Tango".
