= Suntaraporn Band =

Suntaraporn สุนทราภรณ์
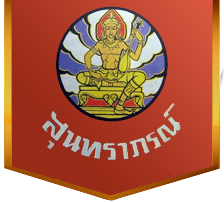

Background information
- Genres: Luk Krung; Jazz; Country; Marching; Ballad; Folk
- Years active: 1939–present
- Website: http://www.websuntaraporn.com/

The Suntaraporn are the first Luk Krung (ลูกกรุง) music band in Thailand, established on 20 November 1939 by Eua Sunthornsanan and his friends. The band's well known and popular by many songs made from different rhythms and style in singing, such as Ramwong Rhythm (จังหวะรำวง), Tango Rhythm (จังหวะแทงโก้), Cha-cha-cha Rhythm (จังหวะชะชะช่า), etc. Having singers that are popular in the past singing in vinyl records such as Manthana Morakul, Lert Prasomsrap, Chawalee Chuangwith, Winai Chulabutsapa, Pensri Poomchoosri, Chantana Obayawarth, Srisuda Ratchatawan, Woranuch Arree, etc.

== History ==
In the early 1930s the band was formed under the leadership of Luang Sukhum-Naipradit. The band members contain Eua Sunthornsanan and his friends.

Later in 1936 the band was performing for Thai Films Co., Ltd. Limited by Bhanubandhu Yugala. When the company closed down, the band belonged to Phra Chenduriyang who was the band director at the time and Phra Chenduriyang was the Fine Arts Department's government officer. Wilart Osatanon, the director of the Publicity Department (Later changed to the Public Relations Department) wanted a band to perform during the publishing news on the radio. The Publicity Department requested the Fine Arts Department to transfer the band member to the Publicity Department. Eua became the band leader, while Wes Sunthornchamorn, his friend, became the assistant band leader.

The band used "The Publicity Department's dance band" under the government work. However, during outside government work, The band used "Suntaraporn Band". "Suntaraporn" came from a combination of Eua's last name and his lover's name, Arporn.

== Present day ==
The Suntaraporn Legacy was given to Eua's daughter, Atiporn Kannasuth as legal inheritance rights. Atiporn formed Suntaraporn Foundation under royal patronage of Princess Sirindhorn, having the intention to preserve and promote Suntaraporn's songs.

While the Public Relations Department's Band now had Chomchay Arunchan as the band leader and Director of Music Administration. In recent times, Piprai Jimeesik became the Director of Music Administration.
