= Ban Muang (newspaper) =

Thai newspaper (1972-2016)

Ban Muang (Thai: บ้านเมือง, RTGS: Ban Mueang) was a Thai newspaper published from 1972 to 2016, and since then operating as a news website. It was owned by Banharn Silpa-archa, who became prime minister in 1995. Ban Muang was middle-sized and positioned itself as a mass-oriented paper. It was one of the first to carry horse-racing programmes, and was known for its classifieds section.

The newspaper was established on 23 May 1972, with Wijarn Pukpiboon as director and Mana Praepan as its first editor. Under Mana, Ban Muang became the country's third-most popular mass daily. He left the paper in 1991 due to internal disagreements. The newspaper was originally printed by the Ban Muang Kan Phim company (บ้านเมืองการพิมพ์). In 2000, Pracha Maleenont bought the company and began publishing under a new name, but soon ceased operations, after which Wijarn relaunched Ban Muang under the Navakit Ban Muang company (นวกิจบ้านเมือง). The company printed the daily paper until it announced cessation on 1 January 2017, citing inability to compete in the changed media landscape and economic environment.
