= Eua Sunthornsanan =

Eua Suntornsanan เอื้อ สุนทรสนาน
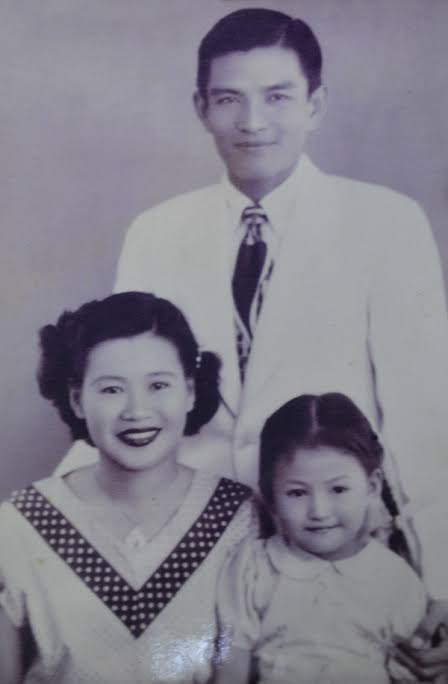
- Eua and his family

Background information
- Also known as: Suntaraporn.
- Born: Boon-Eua Suntornsanan; 21 January 1910; Amphawa, Samut Songkhram, Thailand
- Died: 1 April 1981 (aged 71) Bangkok, Thailand
- Genre: Luk Krung
- Occupations: Singer, composer, bandleader
- Years active: 1928 —1981
- Spouse: Arporn Kannasuth (1946–1981)

Eua Suntornsanan (Thai: เอื้อ สุนทรสนาน; RTGS: Uea Sunthonsanan; January 21, 1910, Amphawa, Samut Songkhram Province – April 1, 1981) was a singer, Thai composer and bandleader of the Suntaraporn Band. He was a pioneer in introducing Western music into Thai culture. He started the trend of international style Thai music, or Phleng Thai Sakon. He composed over 2,000 songs that have been popular until today, for example, Rumwong Loy Kratong, many Songkran and New Year songs, and other Thai traditional songs. In 1975, he was given an insignia by the king. In 1981 he died of cancer. In 2007, the Ministry of Culture of Thailand nominated Kru Eua for the United Nations Educational, Scientific and Culture Organization (UNESCO) to honor Kru Eua Suntornsanan as Personality of the Year on the list of Anniversary of World Personalities and Historic Events 2010-2011, which was granted in 2010. Received the honor of being Burapasilpin in the performing arts category in 2015.

== Early life ==
Eua Suntornsanan was born on January 21, 1910, in Amphawa, Samut Songkhram Province. His father was Mr. Dee Suntornsanan. His mother was Mrs. Sae Suntornsanan. He had 3 siblings. At age 9, he came to stay with his brother in Bangkok and started his primary education. Eua studied Western classical music at the Phran Luang School. His first instrument was violin. By the age of nine, Eua was developed enough to play in an orchestra.

== Career ==
Eua published his first written song, “Yod Teong Tonk Lom”, at the age of 20, and it was played in the musical comedy of Mea Ruen, where his unique voice and instrumental talent were discovered. At the time, he was working as a civil servant for the now-defunct Performance Department. He was receiving 20 baht per month for playing in the Big Band. He also worked at the Fine Art Department, and performed at many important events. In 1936, Eua, at age 26, had a chance to perform an original soundtrack, phleng Thai sakol, that would also be used in a film. Where his first song would be recorded, “Nart Naree” . He sang in duet with Ms. Wasana. Afterward, Eua became the directing composer for several Thai films, combining Thai music with Western’s styles like Jazz and Classically music. His style was later developed into a romantic music, luk krung, which translates as “child of the city” and was usually associated with the elite Bangkokians. He also had a chance to record his third song in his life “Nai Fahn” during the making of the movie “Than Fai Khao”. When the company, Thai films, that he was working for was closed years after, His band was transferred to a government office, The Publicity Department of Thailand (later changed the name to The Public Relations Department in 1952). Later he established his own band “Suntaraporn Band”, Suntaraporn was the first Thai western-style band. Eua’s band marked the beginning of the western-style music era in Thailand from the 1940s to the 1970s. The name “Suntaraporn” is from a combination of His last name “Sunthornsanan” and his beloved wife “Arporn”. The official band is used in government official works to perform the music, while Suntaraporn Band is a freestyle band that performs for special occasions. He initially faced a lot of criticism from Thai people for introducing Western sounds into Thai conservative culture. However, his music was embraced by Prime Minister Plaek Phibunsongkhram, whose government was encouraging modernization and westernization in Thailand. Under Thailand’s Public Relations Department, Eua headed an orchestra, performing live on national radio broadcasts, and also at many government functions and parties. It served as the main orchestra in Thailand during the Second World War. He was the orchestra chief and the chief of music section for the Thai PR department. He retired in 1978 because of his illness, after 42 years of revolutionizing Thai music. He was a dedicated and determined artist throughout his career. He died of cancer on April 1, 1981.

== Personal life ==
Eua Sunthornsanan married Arporn Kannasuth on May 14, 1946. The name of his band came from his surname and her first name combined. They had one daughter, Atiporn Suntornsanan who now runs Suntaraporn Foundation with an aim to promote the life and work of Kru Eua Suntornsanan and Suntaraporn Band.

== Feature films ==
He composed songs in many films such as "Satsanar Ruk Nan Jone" (1950), “Supap Buruth Suea Thai” (1950), "Chai Chart Suea"(1951), "Naresuan"(1957). He was also featured as a starring character in "Ngen Ngen Ngen" (1965).

== Tribute ==
In 2018, he was featured as a Google Doodle on what would have been his 108th birthday.

== See also ==
- Music of Thailand
