= Luk thung =

Thai music genre

- Stylistic origins: Phleng Thai sakon; Thai folk music
- Cultural origins: 1930s, and 1960s, Thailand
- Derivative forms: Phleng phuea chiwit

Fusion genres
- Electronic luk thung

Other topics
- Thai Traditional Music; Thai pop music; mor lam

Luk thung (Thai: ลูกทุ่ง, pronounced [lûːk tʰûŋ], lit. 'child (of the) field') is a genre of Thai music that emerged after World War II in the central region of Thailand. The genre was derived from phleng Thai sakon, and developed in the early-20th century. Suphan Buri in particular became the center of luk thung music, producing many major artists, including Suraphol Sombatcharoen, and Pumpuang Duangjan. The genre has been prominently popularized in the northeastern region, having from its beginnings drawn upon northeastern mor lam musical traditions and the northeastern Isan language.

Luk thung songs consist of poetic lyrics that often reflect the rural lifestyle, cultural traits and social patterns in Thailand. The songs are typically sung with a distinctive country accent and common use of vibrato, and are harmonized with Western instruments, mostly brass and electronic instruments, alongside Thai traditional instruments such as the khaen and phin. Lyrically, the songs dealt with a range of themes, often based on Thai rural life: rural poverty, romantic love, the beauty of rural scenery, religious beliefs, traditional culture, and political crisis.

The first recording of what was considered luk thung was, "Mae Saao Chaao Rai" ("Lady Farmer"), written by Hem Vejakorn for Kamron Samboonnanon in 1938, a released soundtrack for the radio drama, "Saao Chaao Rai" ("Lady Farmer"). The term luk thung was coined on 1 May 1964 by Chamnong Rangsikul who started a TV show for Channel 4 titled "Phleng Luk Thung".

== History ==
=== Origin ===
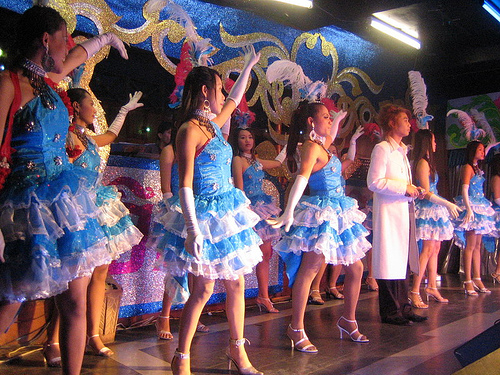
Luk thung concert with Haang Kreuang dancers.

Luk thung traces its roots from phleng Thai sakon, which adopted Western instrumental characteristics like the orchestra and electronic instruments in the time of King Rama IV. Phleng Thai sakon continuously evolved throughout the time of King Rama V, and was showcased in numerous films and stage performances. Atiphob Pataradetpisan's, "Waltz Pleumchit" ("Delighted Mind Waltz") in 1903 was recorded to be the first Thai sakon song.

During Plaek Phibunsongkhram's government (1938-1944), phleng Thai sakon became a form of propaganda for the government to broadcast its political ideology of modernization in Thailand. In 1939, Eua Sunthornsanan formed the first Thai sakon band, called Suntharaporn, using a number of classically trained musicians who had lost their royal appointments following the 1932 coup. Eua Sunthornsanan served the Prime Minister, Plaek Phibunsongkhram, as the head of Thailand's main orchestra, and the music section for Thailand's Public Relations Department. He dominated the music industry by composing over 2,000 songs, leading him to become one of the most influential pioneers of phleng Thai sakon. Some of his notable records were, "Phleng Wattanatum" ("Culture song"), "Phleng Faai" ("Cotton song"), and "Phleng Saang Thai" ("Building Thailand song").

In 1944 the Romvong dance was introduced by the Phibun government's Fine Arts Department when it issued ten "Ramvong Matrathan" ("standard circle dances") to compete against Western dance music. It is suggested that Phibun and his wife, La-iat, had observed rural "Ramthon" ("Drum Dance") performances while visiting Phetchabun province and surrounding areas. La-iat noted some of the texts and melodies and these notes formed the basis of the Fine Arts Department's Ramvong Matrathan. This was a critical step in the future formulation of luk thung. Ramvong went on to become a highly successful musical genre in Thailand for a decade after the mid-1940s. It was Ramvong that bought northeastern performers such as Tumthong Chokchana (a.k.a. Benjamin), born in Ubon, and Chaloemchai Sriruecha, born in Roi Et, into the Thai music industry and so paved the way for the heavy northeastern influence on luk thung music when it emerged.

=== First generation ===
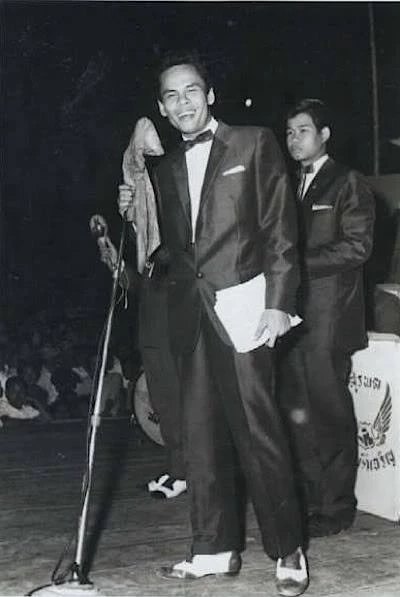
Suraphol Sombatcharoen Thailand's "King of Luk thung".

After World War II, Thailand experienced economic growth, which led to inflation within the country, including a severe shortage of supplies of rice. The entertainment and commercial industries quickly recovered, and artists were able to resume their recording careers. The aftermath of the war influenced new music trends, in particular, lyrics that highlighted the social crisis and government pressure after the war, as well as political and economic concerns.

The first generation emerged from 1945 to 1957. The new style of Thai Sakon evolved into two directions of cultural traits: rural Luk Thung, and urban Luk Krung ("Child of the City"). The original form of luk thung was called phleng talat ("market music"), or also referred to as phleng chiwit ("life music"). The term phleng talat was initially used to refer to luk thung songs that were popular in temple markets and festivities, and phleng chiwit was used to refer to songs that lyrically reflected people's way of life and social concerns. Early phleng chiwit artists include Saeng Napha Boonra-Sri, Saneh Komanchun, and Suraphol Sombatcharoen.

The term luk thung gained popularity in 1964. According to Prakob Chaipipat, Manager of Thai Television Channel 4, "on 11th May, 1964, Jumnong Rangsikul established a TV show, called "Phleng Chao Baan" ("folk song") and showcased three phleng talat artists: Porm Pirom, Pongsri Woranuch, and Toon Tongjai. However, the show was soon taken off the air by Ajin Panjapan, due to its negative reception. In December 1964, Jumnong Rangsikul revived the show, and renamed it "Phleng Luk Thung" ("child of the field music"). After six months the show gained prominent acceptance from society. Moreover, it initiated a trend of luk thung TV shows. "Luk Thung Krung Thai" ("Thai capital luk thung") was later aired by TV Channel 4. Luk thung music gained massive national television exposure, leading to a rapid increase in the number of new artists and songs."

=== Golden age of luk thung ===
Suraphol Sombatcharoen played a major role in launching luk thung's earliest records in the late-1950s to 1960s, leading luk thung to reach its peak of popularity; this earned him the title "king of luk thung". He composed over 100 songs, includes his first hit, "Nam Da Sow Vienne" ("Tears of a Lao Girl") and many well-known records such as "Sieow Sai" ("Stomachache Nervous"), "Kong Bplom" ("Fake Stuff") and "Sao Suan Taeng" ("The Girl of the Cucumber Farm").

In February 1966, Somyot Thassanaphan became the first luk thung artist to win the Thai Royal Golden Disk Award, with "Chor Tip Ruang Tong" ("Divine Bouquet of Gold"), composed by Payong Mookda.

=== Age of musical film ===
In 1970, the release of "Monrak Luk Thung" ("Luk Thung Love Spell"), directed by Rangsi Thatnopyak and starring Mitr Chaibancha and Petchara Chaowarat, popularized luk thung throughout Thailand. This led to a rapid increase of musical films showcasing luk thung music, and provided an opportunity for many new artists later in the period. Some of the notable films include "Mae Sri Phai" ("Mother Sri Phai") and "Thung Setti" ("Country Millionaire"). These were followed by "Tone", which starred the rising artist of the period, Sangthong Sisai. Sangthong's records incorporate energetic tempo and rhythm, demonstrated in his famous hit, "Lung Sang Thong" ("Uncle Sang Thong").

During Thanom Kittikachorn's government, most records emphasized resistance to the corrupt government. "Yom Mabarn Jao Ka" ("King of Hell") gained Buppha Saichol attention due to her depiction of opposing views towards the government, leading her to become one of the most successful artists of the period.

=== Haang kreuang and concerts ===
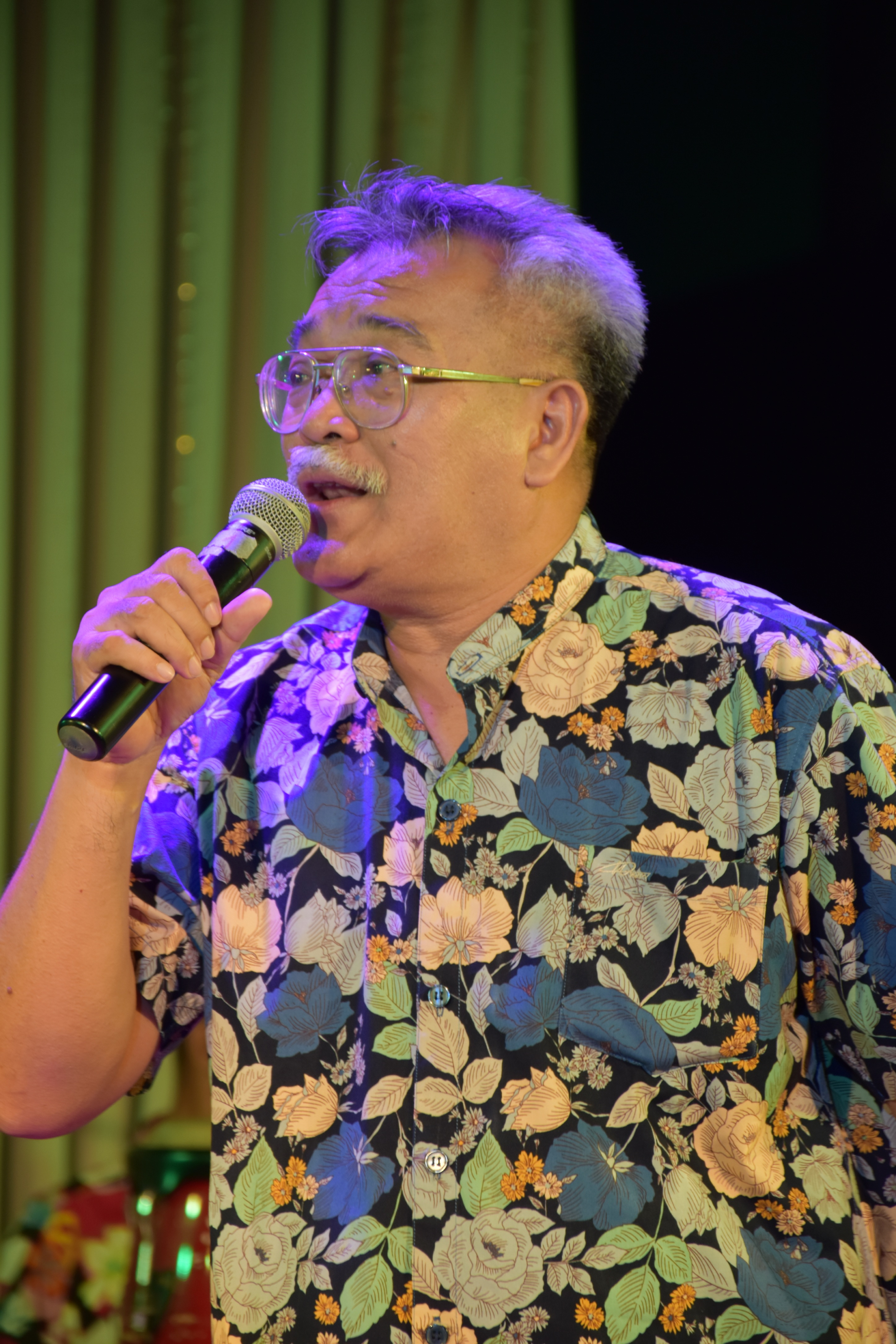
Janepob Jobkabuanwan Important people who promote culture and record the history of Luk Thung.

In more recent times, groups of backup dancers dressed in Western-influenced fancy costumes (known as haang kreung) have become an essential component in luk thung concerts. Pumpuang Duangjan was the most successful luk thung female artist of the period; she pioneered a new style by incorporating string music into luk thung, resulting in a genre called electronic luk thung. Her first record was "Phleng Kaew Raw Pi" ("Kaew, Wait for Me"), followed by many other hits, earning her the title "queen of luk thung".

== See also ==
- Music of Thailand
- Phleng Thai sakon
- Luk krung
- Mon Rak Luk Thung
- Phleng phuea chiwit
- Mor lam
