= Luk krung =

Luk krung (Thai: ลูกกรุง, pronounced [lûːk krūŋ]; lit. 'child of the city') is a genre of Thai music. It is a more polished, urban style, compared to its folk music counterpart, luk thung. Luk krung songs commonly feature themes about feelings of society, people in the capital and occurrences that happen in the period of time. The emotions, the singing, the tone of singer, the songwriter and musicians all form to create an exquisite, delicate and gentle sound. The style of the music and lyrics are similar to poetry and the meaning of lyrics is complex.

== History ==
Luk Krung was first established around 1931, during the reign of King Rama VII, in which Thailand was going through a regime change. Some people told the end of period of King Rama VI around 1912, an Italian musician was employed to bring string instruments to Thailand in order to teach Thai people to play them. Luk Krung became famous around 1932. The melody of song King Rama VI and the song “La tee kluaymai” of Khun Wichitmatra which had a rumba rhythm was brought to be played with Luk Krung style.

The first and most famous luk krung group was the Suntharaphon band (วงดนตรีสุนทราภรณ์). In 1939, The Suntharaphon band was established and became a big band which made the society of that period begin to listen to music. Listeners and record labels began to classify the music into groups, created singers that looked more like the people in city. Musicians, songwriters and singers had a new fashion about their clothes. There were clubs and bars at Ratdamnern road for playing the music. The hotels also had a ballroom in order to play Luk Krung music. After that, Luk Krung song had the comparison with Luk Thung song.

== Luk Krung Artists ==
1. Eua Sunthornsanan
2. Suthep Wongkamhaeng
3. Charin Nantanakorn
4. Thanin Intharathep
5. Narit Aree
6. Bunchuay Hiransunthorn
7. The Impossible
8. Pitthaya Boonyarattaphan
9. Setha Sirachaya
10. Orawee Sujjanon
11. Pensri Poomchoosri
12. Sawalee Pakapan
13. Jittima Juejai
14. Kittikhun Chiansong
15. Utain Prommin
16. Patchara Wangwan
17. Yard Napalai
18. Napat Injaiuea (Gun The Star)

Etc.
