= Suraphol Sombatcharoen =

Thai luk thung singer and former Air Force officer

Suraphol Sombatcharoen สุรพล สมบัติเจริญ
- Thailand's "King of Luk thung".

Background information
- Born: Lamduan Sombatcharoen; 25 September 1930; Suphan Buri, Thailand
- Died: 16 August 1968 (aged 37) Nakhon Pathom, Thailand
- Genre: Luk thung
- Occupations: Singer, Air force officer
- Instrument: Singer
- Years active: 1950-1968

Suraphol Sombatcharoen (25 September 1930 – 16 August 1968) (Thai: สุรพล สมบัติเจริญ) was a Thai luk thung singer and former Air force officer. Dubbed the "King of Luk Thung", he was one of the first and most important stars of the genre. He was fatally shot while seated in his own car after a live performance in Nakhon Pathom.

== Biography ==
Born as Lamduan Sombatcharoen in Suphan Buri province to a wealthy family, he chose Suraphol as his stage name. His first hit came in 1954 with "Nam Ta Lao Wieng" ("Tears of a Lao Girl"). It marked the emergence of luk thung, a Thai counterpart to such crooning styles as Japanese enka and Indonesian kroncong. The genre also embodied influences such as Hollywood film music, American country music, Malay pop and Afro-Cuban rhythms.

Enjoying popularity at the same time as Elvis Presley and The Beatles, Suraphol Sombatcharoen was sometimes called the "Thai Elvis". During the 1960s, there was no Thai performer who was better known than Sombatcharoen.

Suraphol Sombatcharoen composed more than 100 songs. Among his best known compositions are "Sao Suan Taeng" ("The Girl from the Cucumber Field"), "Mong" ("Look"), "Nam Ta Ja Tho" ("The Tears of a Corporal"), "Khong Plom" ("Fake Stuff"), "Muai Cham" ("Broken-Hearted Chinese Girl") and "Pen Sode Tam Mai" ("Why are you still single").

Shortly before his murder, he released his last and most well-known song, "Siphok Pi Haeng Khwam Lang" ("สิบหกปีแห่งความหลัง" or "16 Years of Our Past"), a sad song about the end of his own 16-year marriage that reflected on both the happiness and bitterness of the union.

Sombatcharoen was shot dead by an unknown assailant while walking to his car after a performance on August 16, 1968. The motive for the murder remains unknown.

== Military career ==
Suraphol Sombatcharoen initially enrolls in the Navy as the nurse student of the navy's medical department. But he likes singing very much and he often escape to singing at night until get caught by his commander and imprisoned in the Navy prison. Then he became the icon of many inmates by singing to them before sleep.

After being released from the prison, he switched to the Air Force. One day, he's singing in the party of the Air force, and one member named Flight Lieutenant Pramote Wannapong (เรืออากาศโทปราโมทย์ วรรณพงษ์), and Pramote persuade Suraphol to join the military band of the Air force, and Suraphol accepts it.

== Legacy ==
Suraphol Sombatcharoen's recordings are widely available in Thailand, from shopping malls in Bangkok to rural markets.

Because of "16 Years of Our Past", perhaps Sombatcharoen's most popular song, the 16-year period has become symbolic for numerologically minded Thai people.

The 1983 documentary "Two Faces of Thailand: A Musical Portrait" (part of the Beats of the Heart series) included a segment on luk thung, following Surachai Sombacharoen, Suraphol Sombatcharoen's son, on tour with a show that included a tribute to Suraphol, as well as interviews with family members.

On the 33rd anniversary of Sombatcharoen's death in 2001, the third generation of the Sombatcharoen family luk thung singers made their debut. Surabodin Sombatcharoen, the son of Surachai Sombacharoen and the grandson of Suraphol, sang in front of a packed hall at the Thailand Cultural Centre on 16 August 2001. He was 16 years old at the date of his debut and sang "16 Years of Our Past".

Sombatcharoen's song "Mai Luem" ("Don't forget") was featured in the 2001 film Monrak Transistor, which was directed by Pen-Ek Ratanaruang.

== Albums ==
- 16 Years The Past (16 ปีแห่งความหลัง)
- Siew Sai (เสียวใส้)
- Khong Plom (ของปลอม)
- Khon Hua Lan (คนหัวล้าน)
- Sae See Aei Lue Jek Nang (แซซี้อ้ายลือเจ๊กนัง)
- Yik Tao Lo Soi (ยิกเท้าโหละซั๊วะ)
- Smell Love in "Pa-Sang" (มนต์รักป่าซาง)
- Klin Kam Hom Chuen Jai (กลิ่นแก้มหอมชื่นใจ)

== See also ==
- List of unsolved murders (1900–1979)
