= Chrieng Brunh =

Chrieng Brunh (Northern Khmer: เจรียงเบริญ IPA: [cəriə̯ŋ brəːɲ]) is a type of Khmer vocal music or epic recitative practiced by the Khmers indigenous to Northeast Thailand. From the Khmer words charieng, meaning "song" and brunh referring to the particular rhythm, it is also sometimes transliterated as jarieng be-rin or similar variations. Chrieng brunh may be sung by an individual or as a duet by a man and a woman singing alternating verses. Although this type of folk music can be performed a cappella, it is often accompanied by the khaen. Ethnic Thai's sometime make comparisons to the Lao mor lam, but linguist Christian Bauer has written that chrieng brunh is not an adaptation of other kinds of music in Northeast Thailand but is a traditional form of Khmer music.

== See also ==
- Kantrum
- Music of Cambodia
