= Northern Khmer =

Northern Khmer may refer to:

- Northern Khmer people, ethnic Khmer inhabiting the Surin, Sisaket and Buriram Provinces of Thailand, as well as part of Nakhon Ratchasima Province
- Northern Khmer dialect
