= Vieng Narumon =

Thai singer

- เวียง นฤมล
- Born: Naruemon Pholputtha (Thai: นฤมล พลพุทธา); 11 January 1992 (age 34); Mueang Roi Et district, Roi Et Province, Thailand
- Education: Bunditpatanasilpa Institute
- Occupations: Singer; Actress
- Height: 1.73 m (5 ft 8 in)
- Parents: Suwan Pholputtha (father); Rhieanthong Pholputtha (mother)
- Musical career
- Genres: Luk thung; Mor lam
- Years active: 2017–present
- Label: Grammy Gold GMM Music

Vieng Narumon (Thai: เวียง นฤมล, Thai pronunciation: [wīaŋ ná.rɯ́.mōn]; born 11 January 1992) is a Thai luk thung and Mor lam singer from the Isan area. She has been an artist with Grammy Gold (GMM Grammy) since 2017. Her popular songs include "Wai Ok Hak", "Ngiw Tong Ton Humhon Phoo Bao Kaw" and "Ka Khon Bor Huk Kan".

== Early life ==
She was born into a family of mor lam singers in the village of See Kaew, Tambon See Kaew, Amphoe Mueang Roi Et, in Roi Et Province. She is a daughter of Suwarna Pholphuttha (died in 2020). She finished her education at Bunditpatanasilpa Institute. She is a niece of Roi-et Phetsiam who was a famous Mor lam singer in the 1960s.

== Musical career ==
She started to dance with her father's music band when she studied in primary 5. After that, she got to sing and dance under Nok Aing Mong band. She trained with National Artist of Thailand in 1993, Chaweewan Damnuen. She met with Mor lam songwriter, Amphai Maniwong and Amphai who took her to Sala Khunnawut for recording in Grammy Gold's project Nong Mai Tai Daw: Project II. Her first single was "Huk Bor Dai Tae Luem Ai Bor Long" (ฮักบ่ได้แต่ลืมอ้ายบ่ลง), so she registered as an artist in Grammy Gold since then.

Her other songs include "Wai Ok Hak", "Won Pu Lum Khong", "Huk Laew Kue Bor Huk Loei". In 2018, she collaborated with Beer Promphong on the singles "Rewatta Hukna Leelawadee" and "Rewatta La Huk". In 2021, she was popularized by the single "Ngiw Tong Ton Humhon Phoo Bao Kaw" (งิ้วต่องต้อนฮำฮอนผู้บ่าวเก่า) which has the same melody as "Ngiw Tong Ton" by Banyen Rakgan. In addition, she wrote and sang with herself on the single "Ka Khon Bor Huk Kan". She very successful in 2022 with her single My Old Boyfriend (Returned) (แฟนเก่ากลับใจ).

== Studio Album ==
#	Album	Track listings
1st	โอ้..ล่ะ..หนอ หมอลำ (Oh...Lanor Mor Lam): Released: 24 May 2022; Label: GMM Grammy	Track listing: 1. Oh...Lanor Mor Lam (โอ้..ล่ะ..หนอ หมอลำ); 2. Kid Hod Jung Phu Lanka (คิดฮอดจังภูลังกา); 3. My Old Boyfriend Returned / Faen Kao Klab Jai (แฟนเก่ากลับใจ); 4. Nong Bor Dai Tong Karn E Yang (น้องบ่ได้ต้องการอีหยัง); 5. Sor Khien Khiew Lud Mue (สอเขียนคิ้วหลุดมือ)
2nd	ฝันของอ้ายมีไผเป็นนางเอก (Fun Khong Ai Mee Phai Pen Nang Ek): Released: 17 February 2025; Label: GMM Grammy	Track listing: 1. Khor Hai Fah Suk Sai (ขอให้ฟ้าซุกใส่); 2. Karn Bor Tob Khue Kham Top Thee Chad Jen (การบ่ตอบคือคำตอบที่ชัดเจน); 3. Fun Khong Ai Mee Phai Pen Nang Ek (ฝันของอ้ายมีไผเป็นนางเอก); 4. Muk Nong Bau Nau (มักน้องบ่น้อ); 5. Ma No Ra Len Fai (มโนราห์เล่นไฟ); 6. Hug Ai Pai Deng Dueng (ฮักอ้ายพ่ายเด้งดึ๋ง); 7. Kor Kwarm Tee Bau Kla Song (ข้อความที่บ่กล้าส่ง)

=== Singles ===
Year	Title	Notes
2016	"Low Soo Lharn Fung" (Cover Version)	originally performed by Sala Khunnawut
2017	"Huk Bor Dai Tae Luem Ai Bor Long"	In project Nong Mai Tai Daw : Project II
2017	"Nong Tung Jai Huk Ai Tung Jai Thim"	In project Nong Mai Tai Daw : Project II
2018	"Won Pu Lam Khong"	Her first official single
2018	"Ai Tua Wah Huk Nong"	Original : Monkaen Kaenkoon
2019	"Kong Ai Rue Kong Thim"	
2019	"Huk Mah Tae Chat Kon"	Original : Tai Orathai
2019	"New Year Sia Fan"	
2020	"Wai Ok Hak"	
2020	"Siang Can Jark Man Chan"	Original : Maithai Huajaisin
2020	"Huk Laew Kue Bau Huk Lei"	
2021	"Fark Song Gin Dong Fan"	Original : Siriporn Ampaipong
2021	"Ngiw Tong Ton Humhon Phoo Bao Kaw"	
2021	"Ka Khon Bor Huk Kan"	Written and sung with herself
2021	"Pi Lam Khao"	
2026	"Yoo NamNongBau Tong Keng Bau Dai"	

=== Collaborations ===
- 2019 – Huk Tong Bee (with Tree Chainarong)
- 2020 – Re Wat Ta Huk Na lee Ra Wa Dee (with Beer Prompong)
- 2020 – Yang Huk Pai Eik Dai Bau (with Beer Prompong) (Original : Monkaen Kaenkoon and Meentra Intira)
- 2021 – Re Wat Ta La Huk (with Beer Prompong)
- 2026 – Boon Pa Lah Mod A Yoo (with Monkaen Kaenkoon)

== Filmography ==
=== TV Series ===
Year	Title	Role	TV Network
2020	Mong Kut Doak Ya (มงกุฎดอกหญ้า)	Dr. Nuttalee Naboonlai (Mo Lee) พญ.ณัฐลี นาบุญหลาย (หมอลี) (Invited)	Channel One 31
