= Jonas Andersson =

Jonas Andersson may refer to:

- Jonas Andersson (archer) (born 1979), Swedish archer
- Jonas Andersson (ice hockey) (born 1981), ice hockey player
- Jonas Andersson (swimmer) (born 1984), Swedish swimmer
- Jonas Andersson (speedway rider) (born 1990) in 2009 Individual Speedway Junior European Championship
- Jonas Andersson (football manager) (born 1975), Swedish footballer and manager
- Jonas Andersson (co-driver) (born 1977), Swedish rally co-driver
- Jonas Andersson (politician, born 1972), Swedish politician known as Jonas Andersson i Skellefteå
- Jonas Andersson (politician, born 1989), Swedish politician known as Jonas Andersson i Linghem or Jonas Andersson i Linköping

== See also ==
- Jonas Anderson (born 1972), Swedish singer in Thailand
