= Acehnese poetry =

Form of rhyming poetry

Dôkarim, the author of Hikayat Prang Gômpeuni, 'Saga of the War Against the Dutch'.

Acehnese poetry is a form of rhyming poetry written and recited in the Acehnese language, often composed to serve conventional purposes such as entertainment, cultural transmission, preserving historical and personal events, and as a means of worship or persuasion. Poetry or verse form literature, alongside prose narratives, are the two foundational forms of Acehnese literature.

Acehnese poetry is traditionally composed and performed for people who couldn't read and write, where performances are sometimes accompanied with musical instruments such as rapa'i.

== Metre ==
In most forms, Acehnese poetry has no stanzas and does not belong to the category of metrical verse. Instead, it takes the form of an iambic poem, with stress placed on the final syllable of each metrical foot in a line. Each foot within a line or verse (Acehnese: ayat or narit meupakhôk, 'rhyming prose') generally contains two or three syllables, depending on the pattern used, but it's common for some foots to have an additional syllable or more.

Acehnese poetry has two basic metric patterns, sanjak and nalam

=== Sanjak ===
Sanjak is the native metric pattern of Acehnese and by far the most widely used. The word sanjak itself is derived from the Arabic word "سجع, sajʿ", meaning rhymed prose.

In a 20 buhu sanjak, a verse consists of two half-verses, each half-verse contains two stress groups, and each stress group contains two feet. Each feet consists of three and two syllables.

Sanjak is composed of verses with each of its length are measured by the number of syllables, known as buhu. Generally, buhu consists of 16 to 20 syllables, where the 16 syllables form is considered more traditional, as most early Acehnese works are composed in the 16 buhu. Each verse consists of eight metrical feet, with four feet in each half-line, two feet are referred to as a "stress group". Each feet usually contains two syllables, but it can sometimes have more more.

Within each foot, the stress falls on the final syllable, following the structure of Acehnese phonology. In the example below, each foot is separated with a vertical bar with each stressed syllable bolded.

Judo sidéh | di mideuen prang, | kaphé geuprang | dum geuheungkoe
Ô ya Allah | lôn jak sajan | bahlé sinon | bandum kamoe

— Araby Ahmad, Sijudô Pahlawan Acèh, c 1960

Not all sanjak follows a strict 16 or 20 buhu, most notably traditional sayings and nursery rhymes. Shorter verses may be found in these types of sanjak verses. In the example below, the first foot only contains four syllables, making the first verse only 19 buhu long.

Lalè-lalè | geutanyoe lalè | hana jan tathèe | umue ka tuha
Putéh ngön janggôt | kunèng ngön misè | h'an töm tacôm bèe | tika musala

— Traditional, Lalè-Lalè, Tari Ratoh Jaroe

Additionally, sanjak shares similarities with Chamic and Thai poetry both in its rhyming patterns and number of metrical feet.

=== Nalam ===
Nalam or nazam employs a different metric pattern from sanjak, believed to originate from the poetic traditions of Arabic or Persian. The word nalam is derived from the Arabic word "نظم, naẓm", meaning poem.

Nalam is strictly composed of 12 buhu, consisting of three stress groups.

Wajéb iman | dum geutanyoe | akan nabi
Wajéb patéh | peue nyang neukheun | uléh nabi.
Beu tapatéh | nyang goh datang | neupeuhaba
Miseue mawöt | nyang that sakét | tapeurasa

— Anzib Lamnyong, Wajéb Iman, c 1974

== Rhyme ==
Acehnese poetry employs a combination of an end rhyme and an internal rhyme scheme. Durie believes that the end rhyme may have been influenced by Malay, while the internal rhyme may have been inherited from Mainland Southeast Asia, with sanjak bearing significance similarity with Thai's klon pet in rhyme position.

=== End rhyme ===
End rhymes in sanjak and nalam are obligatory. In sanjak, one end rhyme span across whole verses, while in nalam, end rhymes are grouped into doublets. Here are examples of end rhymes in sanjak and nalam respectively, marked with a double line.

Lôn cok daweuet | deungön keureutah, | teuma lôn kisah | keu pié droe ||
Supaya jeuet | keu 'ibarat, | jeuet seulamat | dua nanggroe ||
Geutanyoe taudép | dalam dônya, | dua peukara | h'an tom sunyoe ||
Saboh bagoe | tuntut 'èleumèe, | mita gurèe | nyang peuhareutoe ||
Dua bagoe | mita hareukat, | tapiléh pat | laba rugoe ||
Meung bèk teungku | jalan salah, | banci Allah | keu geutanyoe ||

— Leube Isa, Hikayat Ranto, c 19th century

Ureueng ta'at | neubri nèkmat | dalam kubu ||
Nèkmat syeuruga | Tuhan buka | keunan laju ||
Beutapatéh | uroe kiamat | dudoe teuka ||
Nyan keu uroe | keususahan | harô-hara ||

— Anzib Lamnyong, Wajéb Iman, c 1974

In the example given, the sanjak verse kept the -oe rhyme throughout the verse while the nalam verse switched, with the first and second lines having the -u rhyme whereas the third and fourth lines switches into the -a rhyme.

=== Internal rhyme ===
Internal rhymes differs between sanjak and nalam. In nalam, internal rhymes are rare but does sometimes occur, while internal rhymes in sanjak can be further divided into two forms, obligatory and secondary. Internal rhymes in both sanjak and nalam varies between each verses, but sanjak may also employ a consistent rhyming pattern across a sequence of verses.

==== Internal rhyme in sanjak ====
Obligatory internal rhymes in sanjak follows a pattern of the second stress group rhyming with the third within a verse. This obligatory internal rhyme spans all forms of sanjak poems and can be found in verses with as little as 6 buhu long to 20. Rhymes are marked with a double line.

'Oh troe || tumpoe || pi klat
'Oh deuek || dumpeue || leugat

— Hasjim MK, c 1977

Salam 'alaikôm | warahmatullah, || jaroe dua blah || ateueh jeumala
Jaroe lôn siplôh, | di ateueh ulèe, || meu'ah lôn lakèe || bak kawôm dum na
Jaroe lôn siplôh, | di ateueh ubôn || salam 'alaikôm || lôn teugo sapa

— Traditional, Saleuem

Secondary internal rhymes in sanjak follows a pattern of the last syllable of the first stress group rhyming with the first syllable of the second. This secondary internal rhyme is found in more recent works, specifically those that are 20 buhu long, where it coexisted alongside the obligatory internal and end rhyme. In the following example, the end rhyme is marked with A, the obligatory internal rhyme is marked with B, and the secondary internal rhyme is marked with C.

Lakoe pi kaya^{C} | nama^{C} meugah that,^{B} | di jih buet meuhat^{B} | jibloe-bloe u thô^{A}
Pèng jih meuribèe^{C} | bajèe^{C} meukilat^{B} | haté seunang that^{B} | po dara barô^{A}

— Syeh Rih Krueng Raya, Kareuna Matuan, c 1968

==== Internal rhyme in nalam ====
Internal rhymes in nalam is not obligatory, but it can still be found in several works and is deemed higher in aesthetic quality when present. Internal rhymes in nalam follows a pattern of the first stress group rhyming with the second within a verse. Rhymes are marked with a double line.

Habéh maté || bandum saré || malêngkan Tuhan
Langèt bumoe || kôn lé meunoe || ka neusimpan

— Anzib Lamnyong, Wajéb Iman, c 1974

== Forms ==
The use of Acehnese poetry can be divided into two contexts, poetic and non-poetic. While poetry is an integral part of most recitation performances in Acehnese, it can also be found in colloquial contexts such as common speech in the form of proverbial sayings and pantôn.

=== Pantôn ===
An Acehnese hawker may use pantôn to grab potential buyers' attention to his goods.

Pantôn is a short form of poetry constructed in the metric of sanjak. The word pantôn may have been derived from Malay pantun, but they differ greatly in structure and form, another theory suggests that they share a common Austronesian origin. In every day speech, pantôn is frequently used, usually to give emphasis to a message, but it's also used in traditional business settings such as in street cries by hawkers.

Bloe, hai bloe!
Mangat reujang kamoe meuwoe
Mubri mantong murah-murah
Rugoe samah, h'an meuhiroe

Pantôn typically consists of two verses that uses a fixed internal rhyme, each half-verse of a pantôn is referred to as a rungkhé, which is shown as a separate line here. Within a pantôn, the first verse or section is called the flower (bungong) or the stem (canèk), while the second is called the contents (asoe). The bungong of a pantôn is the introductory part, often using imagery of every day life such as nature or events, while the asoe conveys the plain message of the pantôn. Often times, a bungong would have a clear connection to the asoe of the pantôn, other times, a bungong may be used as a riddle or an appetiser that builds up to the message conveyed in the asoe.

Bukön sayang lôn kalön labu
Teungöh lôn sibu, ka maté pucôk
Hana lôn sangka meunan buet teungku
Teungöh lôn bri bu, taleuek ka geujôk

— Zainuddin, c 1965

A pantôn may have more than two rungkhé, such as three, six, eight, or twelve rungkhé. Eight to twelve-fold rungkhé pantôn is traditionally known as a haba meualeuet or haba meucanèk, but are very rare nowadays.

=== Hadih Maja ===
Hadih maja is another short form of poetry in the metric of sanjak, it is equivalent to traditional sayings or proverb. The word hadih is derived from the Arabic word "حديث, ḥadīṯ" or hadith in its Islamic sense of "the sayings of Prophet Muhammad". Hadih maja are words of advice that has been passed down for generations concerning the rules of every day life, usually moral advice that has not been prescribed by religion.

Hadih maja is usually in the form of concise short phrases, often irregular in structure and rhyming.[248] In the example below, the first line has 12 buhu while the second has 16.

Bubèe dua jab, seureukab dua muka
Keunoe pi toe, keudéh pi rab, bandum pat meuteumèe Iaba

— Hasjim M.K., c 1977

== Bibliography ==
- Hurgronje, C. Snouck (Christiaan Snouck); Wilkinson, Richard James (1906). The Achehnese. Robarts - University of Toronto. Leyden E.J. Brill.
- Cowan, H. K. J. (1982). "The Achehnese Metre sanja' and the Thai Klɔːn Pɛːt". Journal of the Royal Asiatic Society. 114 (2): 156–160. doi:10.1017/S0035869X00159209. ISSN 2051-2066.
- Abdullah, Imran Teuku (1991). Hikayat Meukuta Alam.
- Daud, Bukhari (1997). Writing and reciting Acehnese: perspectives on language and literature in Aceh (PhD thesis). The University of Melbourne. hdl:11343/37197.
