= Chalermpol Malakham =

Thai singer

Chalermpol Malakham เฉลิมพล มาลาคำ
- Born: 10 October 1962 (age 63); Surin Province, Thailand
- Genres: Mor lam; Luk thung
- Occupation: Singer
- Instrument: Vocal
- Years active: 1985–present
- Label: Krung Thai Music Audio • Topline Diamond

Chalermpol Malakham (also written Malakam, Thai: เฉลิมพล มาลาคำ; born 10 October 1962 in Surin Province), is a singer from the Isan area of Thailand. Known mostly for the Luk Thung and Mor lam styles, he is also considered a talented performer of Kantrum. Although the majority of Chalermpol's songs are in Thai, he often sings in Northern Khmer as well.

== Early life and career ==
He was born on 10 October 1962, in Surin Province. He finished education in Primary 4, and started on stage in a singing contest presented by Radio Thailand of Surin Province. He recorded his first album "Sa Uen Uai Porn", but he was made popular in 1990 by song titled "Tam Jai Mae Terd Nong", because Mor lam is very popular at national level as well as in foreign countries to date. After becoming popular, he moved to Ubon Ratchathani Province.

In 2011 Thai general election, he registered as a member of House of Representatives of Thailand from Chartthaipattana Party, but he retired in the next election as his wife opposed.

Since 2013, he has worked less as an entertainer because he was elected headman in Ban Tha Charoen, Tambon Thalad, Warinchamlab District, Ubon Ratchathani Province, but he still accepts to perform on stage.

== Partial discography ==
- Tam Jai Mae Terd Nong (ตามใจแม่เถิดน้อง)
- Ror Mia Phee Pler (รอเมียพี่เผลอ)
- Ar Dia Rak Wan Khao Phan Sa (อดีตรักวันเข้าพรรษา)
- Pued Tam Nan Bak Job Loey (เปิดตำนานบักจอบหลอย)
- Kid Hod Pla Keng (คิดฮอดปลาเข็ง)
- Sieng Jak Phoo Yai Baan (เสียงจากผู้ใหญ่บ้าน)

== Filmography ==
=== TV Drama ===
- 2017 - Nai Hoy Tha Min
- 2018 - Dao Charat Faa

=== Film ===
- 2018 - Hak Paeng
