= Jernjern Boonsoongnern =

Thai singer (born 1957)

Jernjern Boonsoongnern เจินเจิน บุญสูงเนิน
- Born: Nattawat Boonkirin (Thai: ประเชิญ บุญสูงเนิน); November 25, 1957 (age 68); Sung Noen district, Nakhon Ratchasima Province
- Genres: Pop, Blues, Gospel, Luk Thung, luk Krung
- Occupation: Singer
- Years active: 1984–present
- Labels: Lepso Studio, Pro Media Mart
- Spouse: Prajak Nasari (dead)

Nattawat Boonkirin (Thai: ณัฐวรรธน์ บุญคีรินทร์; born November 25, 1957), known professionally as Jernjern Boonsoongnern (Thai: เจินเจิน บุญสูงเนิน) is a Thai singer. She is recognized as one of the earliest openly transgender female artists in the Thai entertainment industry. She is part of a prominent musical family, being the sister of pop singer Nittaya Boonsoongner and the aunt of singer and producer The Toys.

== Early life ==
Jernjern Boonsoongnern, named Nattawat Boonkirin, was born on November 25, 1957, in Sung Noen District, Nakhon Ratchasima Province. She was assigned male at birth. She is the son of Udom Boonsoongnern, a monk at Chatturat district, Chaiyaphum Province. She was born in a poor family, which her mom abandoned them at a young age. She finished highschool at Ratchasima Witthayalai School. She continue studying at Chiang Mai University until she got a degree in Faculty of Education. While she was studying in Chiang Mai, she worked a part time job as a singer in restaurants. She switched her clothes to a woman and known monomously as Jernjern.

== Career ==
In 1984, Jernjern officially started her singing career when she joined a singing contest at KPN Award and won. Then, she moved out from her home to Bangkok. After years in Bangkok, her music professor ask her if he could make a music for her, so she made an album, which became very successful. Her album later got cancelled because she made a deal illegally.

In 1989, while she was performing at a restaurant inside Mido Hotel in Saphan Khwai, she met Wisan Laukaewnu, the owner of Lepso Studio, which was looking for his company's first artist, was highly impressed by her performance. He then spent three days speaking with the renowned songwriter Pornpot Antanai about her past life stories. This collaboration resulted in her debut album, Chan Ko Pen Phu Ying Khon Nueng. The album contained 10 tracks, all of which were written directly from Jernjern's real life, and it became a successful collaboration.

After her successful life, Jernjern moved to the United States in 2002 after a friend told her to invest as a partner in a restaurant there. However, it turned out she was defrauded out of millions of baht in partnership funds after working there for only eight days. Although she won the lawsuit, she was unable to recover any money because the culprit could not be located. As a result, she had to travel and perform in various locations, spending a total of 14 years living in the United States. Afterward, she released six collaborative albums with Laotian singers in Laos. Between 2014 and 2015, Jernjern released a total of four new singles.

In 2019, her husband, which he met while living in United States, died by Cancer.

== Discography ==
=== Albums ===
==== Jernjern Lullaby Fans (เจินเจินกล่อมแฟน) — 1984 [Burapha Tape] ====
- Henjai Nai Rak (เห็นใจในรัก)
- Odon Rak (ออดอ้อนรัก)
- Kliat Chan Thamai (เกลียดฉันทำไม)
- Bu-nga Wa-we (บุหงาว้าเหว่)
- Chotmai Rak (จดหมายรัก)
- Henjai Chan Noi (เห็นใจฉันหน่อย)
- Rak Ring Ngo (รักริงโง)
- Na-tang Huachai (หน้าต่างหัวใจ)
- Rak Ting Dong (รักติงดอง)
- Mai Daling (มายดาร์ลิ่ง)
- Sawan Pen Khong Rao (สวรรค์เป็นของเรา)
- Sawasdee Khwam Rak (สวัสดีความรัก)

==== I Am Also a Woman (ฉันก็เป็นผู้หญิงคนหนึ่ง) — 1990 [Lepso] ====
- Chan Ko Pen Phu Ying Khon Nueng (ฉันก็เป็นผู้หญิงคนหนึ่ง)
- Tong Su... Ching Cha Chana (ต้องสู้...จึงจะชนะ)
- Phua Kha... Khrai Ya Tae (ผัวข้า...ใครอย่าแตะ)
- Rueang Nai Chai Mi Khrai Ru (เรื่องในใจมีใครรู้)
- Chan Hai Thoe Mai Dai (ฉันให้เธอไม่ได้)
- Kaeo Ni Phuea Thoe (แก้วนี้เพื่อเธอ)
- Faen Chan Ni Chan Pai (แฟนฉันหนีฉันไป)
- Duem..... Duem Ik Kaeo (ดื่ม.....ดื่มอีกแก้ว)
- Yangngai Ko Mai Mueankan (ยังไงก็ไม่เหมือนกัน)
- Nam Thewada (น้ำเทวดา)
- Mai Yak Khit (ไม่อยากคิด)
- Thoe Tong Otthon (เธอต้องอดทน)

==== I Am Thai (ข้าคือคนไทย) — 1993 [Lepso] ====
- Kha... Khue Khon Thai (ข้า...คือคนไทย)
- Chiwit Chan... Chiwit Diao (ชีวิตฉัน...ชีวิตเดียว)
- Phrachan Siao (พระจันทร์เสี้ยว)
- Khrang Nueng Khong Chan (ครั้งหนึ่งของฉัน)
- Ya Tham Chue Chan (อย่าถามชื่อฉัน)
- Mi Thoe... Mi Chan... Mi (มีเธอ...มีฉัน...มี)
- Phrungni Tong Di Kwa (พรุ่งนี้ต้องดีกว่า)
- Chiwit Ni Mi Doemphan (ชีวิตนี้มีเดิมพัน)
- Nung Lom Hom Fa (นุ่งลมห่มฟ้า)
- Mei Hua (เหมยฮัว)
- Khao Kaeng... Tit Din (ข้าวแกง...ติดดิน)
- Mia Cha... Chong Charoen (เมียจ๋า...จงเจริญ)

==== Night Butterfly (ผีเสื้อราตรี) — 1995 [Lepso] ====
- Phisuea Ratri (ผีเสื้อราตรี)
- Thaokae (เถ้าแก่)
- Phleng... Rotfai (เพลง...รถไฟ)
- Yim Su (ยิ้มสู้)
- Khwam Rak Cha Cha (ความรักชะช่า)
- Sanya... Saban (สัญญา...สาบาน)
- Dao Talok Nai Lok Klom Klom (ดาวตลกในโลกกลมๆ)
- Nangfa Chamlaeng (นางฟ้าจำแลง)
- Phleng... Seng (เพลง...เซ็ง)
- ANATA Thiao Lai Thiao Khue (ANATA เทียวไล้เที่ยวขื่อ)
- Ching Chai Mai (จริงใช่ไหม)
- Phleng Sutthai (เพลงสุดท้าย)

==== Miracle Luk Thung (ลูกทุ่งมหัศจรรย์) — 1996 ====
- Khaen (แค้น)
- Mia Ma Laeo (เมียมาแล้ว)
- Chai Man Waep (ใจมันแว๊บ)
- Diao Mai Rak (เดี๋ยวไม่รัก)
- Muean Ta Rak Yai (เหมือนตารักยาย)
- Khrai Ao Khong Nu Pai (ใครเอาของหนูไป)
- Sawasdee Yam Chao (สวัสดียามเช้า)
- Siap Ton Phloe (เสียบตอนเผลอ)
- Ngao Chai Rai Khu (เหงาใจไร้คู่)
- Ngok Muean Mae (งกเหมือนแม่)
- Chai Krapong (ชายกระโปรง)
- Chang Man Hoe (ช่างมันเฮอะ)

==== Billion Luk Thung (ลูกทุ่งพันล้าน) — 2001 [Cosmo] ====
- Khao Non Ban Nai (เขานอนบ้านใน)
- Khut Din Chaeng (ขุดดินแช่ง)
- Athit La Wan (อาทิตย์ละวัน)
- Phuchai Thai Banchi (ผู้ชายท้ายบัญชี)
- Huachai Thotsakan (หัวใจทศกรรณฐ์)
- Anitcha Thingchoe (อนิจจาทิงเจอร์)
- Chup Laeo La (จูบแล้วลา)
- Khaen (แค้น)
- Okhak Tam Baisang (อกหักตามใบสั่ง)
- Nao Song Na (หนาวสองหน้า)

==== Billion Luk Thung - New Cover (ลูกทุ่งพันล้าน ปกใหม่) — 2001 [Cosmo] ====
- Okhak Tam Baisang (อกหักตามใบสั่ง)
- Ta To Ta Fan To Fan (ตาต่อตา ฟันต่อฟัน)

==== Your Heart Is Blacker Than Coffee (ใจเธอดำยิ่งกว่ากาแฟ) — 2011 [Pro Media Mart] ====
- Chai Thoe Dam Ying Kwa Kafae (ใจเธอดำยิ่งกว่ากาแฟ)
- My Love Sutthirak Khong Chan (My Love สุดที่รักของฉัน)
- Rak Chua Khuen (รักชั่วคืน)
- Phaendin Thong (แผ่นดินทอง)
- Wiwa Lom (วิวาห์ล่ม)
- Ai Yo Ai Yo Khit Thueng Thoe (อ๊ายโหย่ อ๊ายโหย่ คิดถึงเธอ)
- Saeng Noi Noi (แสงน้อยๆ)
- Ruea Rak (เรือรัก)
- Nueng Kham... Thi Yak Bok Wa Rak (หนึ่งคำ...ที่อยากบอกว่ารัก)
- Khon Ni Hae (คนนี้แหละ)
- Chai Thoe Dam Ying Kwa Kafae (Instrumental) (ใจเธอดำยิ่งกว่ากาแฟ (Instrumental))
- My Love Sutthirak Khong Chan (Instrumental) (My Love สุดที่รักของฉัน (Instrumental))

==== If I Miss You More Than This (ถ้าคิดถึงเธอมากกว่านี้) — 2014 [Hummingbird Music] ====
- Tha Khit Thueng Thoe Mak Kwa Ni (ถ้าคิดถึงเธอมากกว่านี้)
- Deejai Dai Rak Thoe (ดีใจได้รักเธอ)
- Ruesuk Dee Thi Khit Thueng (รู้สึกดีที่คิดถึง)
- Long Rak Chan Noi Dai Mai (Feat. Pu Prachak) (ลองรักฉันหน่อยได้ไหม (Feat. ปุ๊ ประจักษ์))
- Tong Tham Kan Song Khon (ต้องทำกันสองคน)
- Chan Mai Tho Pai Rue Thoe Mai Tho Ma (ฉันไม่โทรไปหรือเธอไม่โทรมา)
- Mai Chai Khrang Raek Thi Thoe Lai Chai (ไม่ใช่ครั้งแรกที่เธอหลายใจ)
- Chan Kamlang Don Lok (ฉันกำลังโดนหลอก)
- Chaochai Rue Pisat (เจ้าชายหรือปีศาจ)
