= Kantrum =

Khmer folk music genre

Kantrum (Khmer: កន្ត្រឹម, Thai: กันตรึม) is a type of folk music played by the Khmer in Isan, Thailand, living near the border with Cambodia. It is a fast, traditional dance music. In its purest form, cho-kantrum, singers, percussion and fiddles dominate the sound. A more modern form using electric instrumentation arose in the mid-1980s.

== Language ==
Kantrum is distinct from a linguistic perspective. As the Khmer native to Thailand are bilingual, kantrum songs can be sung in Thai (Isan dialect), Northern Khmer or a combination of the two. In the case of the latter, it is most common that a complete verse will be sung in Thai followed by a reciprocating verse in Khmer. However, code switching between the two languages within the same verse also occurs, lending to a wide variety of possibilities for rhyming and tonal euphony.

== Performers ==
In the late-1980s, Darkie became the genre's biggest star, crossing into mainstream markets in the later 1990s. In the mid-2010s, Darkie found popularity online, particularly among Westerners, for his rendition of the Sinn Sisamouth song "Sat Tituy". Another artist known for Kantrum is Chalermpol Malakham, although he is also a popular performer of the Luk Thung and Morlam styles of music.

== See also ==
- Chrieng Brunh
- Luk Thung
- Morlam
- Music of Thailand
- Music of Cambodia
- Khmer Surin
