= Somjit Borthong =

Thai luk thung and mor lam singer

Somjit Borthong สมจิตร บ่อทอง
- Birth name: Somjit Thongbor
- Born: January 21, 1964 (age 61); Yasothon Province, Thailand
- Genres: Mor lam; luk thung
- Occupation: Singer
- Instrument: Vocal
- Years active: 1983–present
- Labels: Sure Entertainment; MD Tape; Master Tape; Topline Diamond

Somjit Borthong (Thai: สมจิตร บ่อทอง, RTGS: Somchit Bothong) born January 21, 1964, in Loeng Nok Tha District, Yasothon Province, Thailand) is a famous Thai Luk thung and Mor lam singer. He was made popular by the song "Kulab Daeng".

== Early life ==
He was born on January 21, 1964, in Yasothon Province. He was a son of Bunthan and Chan Thongbor. He finished his secondary education from Kudchumwitthaya School.

== Career ==
He started on stage as an entertainer in 1983, as a member of Mor lam band "Rung Tawan See Thong". Next, in 1989, Dao Bandon persuaded him to be an artist for the record label Sure Entertainment. In 1990, he became very popular and famous for his song, Kulab Daeng (Thai: กุหลาบแดง, transl. The Red Rose). He was an artist in Sure Entertainment for 8 years, until he moved to record label MD Tape. Currently, he is an artist for record label Topline Diamond.

== Partial discography ==
- Kulab Daeng (กุหลาบแดง)
- Kieaw Khao Koai Nang (เกี่ยวข้าวคอยนาง)
- Koy Nong Kuean Na (คอยน้องคืนนา)
- Kid Hod Ta Lord Wela (คิดฮอดตลอดเวลา)
- Mak Sao Sam Noei (มักสาวส่ำน้อย)
- Khong Fak Jak Khon Lai Jai (ของฝากจากคนหลายใจ)
