= Pornsak Songsaeng =

Thai luk tung singer (1960–2021)

Pornsak Songsaeng พรศักดิ์ ส่องแสง
- Born: Boonsao Prajantasen (บุญเสาร์ ประจันตะเสน); 2 November 1960; Khon Kaen, Thailand
- Died: 15 October 2021 (aged 60) Nong Bua Lamphu, Thailand
- Genres: Luk thung; mor lam
- Years active: 1981–2021
- Label: Sieangsiam

Pornsak Songsaeng (Thai: พรศักดิ์ ส่องแสง; born Boonsao Prajantasen; 2 November 1960 – 15 October 2021) was a Thai luk thung and mor lam singer. He was known for the song "Sao Jan Kang Koab".

== Biography ==
Songsaeng was born Boonsao Prajantasen on 2 November 1960 in Khon Kaen Province.

=== Career ===
Songsaeng began performing on-stage in 1981 before establishing his music band, Champ Isan. He was later given the stage name Pornsak Songsaeng by Rak Watthanaya. He has recorded many studio albums. Songsaeng's fame peaked between 1986 and 1988 following the release of his studio album, Toey Sao Ja Kang Koab. His other popular studio albums include Phoo Phae Rak and Mee Miea Dek. He remained one of the top Thai mor lam singers for over a decade.

=== Family life ===
He married Jularrat Prajantasen. He lived in Nong Bua Lamphu Province.

=== Death ===
Songsaeng died from heart failure on 15 October 2021 at the age of 60 in Nong Bua Lamphu Province.

== Discography ==
=== Albums ===
- 1981: Suea Sam Nuek Bap (เสือสำนึกบาป)
- 1982: Num Na Nakhon Phanom (หนุ่มนานครพนม)
- 1983: Loi Phae (ลอยแพ) (2526)
- 1985: Mae Khong Khrai (แม่ของใคร)
- 1986: Sao Jan Kang Kop (สาวจันทร์กั้งโกบ) (2529)
- 1987: Khon Klai Ban (คนไกลบ้าน)
- 1993: Phua Phloe Joe Kan (ผัวเผลอเจอกัน)
- 1995: Sao In Toe (ลาวอินเตอร์)
- 1995: Khao Luem Rao Laeo (เขาลืมเราแล้ว)
- 1998: Thang Jep Thang Men (ทั้งเจ็บทั้งเหม็น)
- 1999: Sao Jan 42 (สาวจันทร์ 42)
- 2000: Nang Mai Tit (นั่งไม่ติด)
- 2001: Sao Joei Jai Juet (สาวเจ้ยใจจืด)
- 2001: Plop Jai Nong Lek (ปลอบใจน้องเล็ก)
- 2001: Rak Borisut (รักบริสุทธิ์)
- 2003: Rak Tem Roi (รักเต็มร้อย)
- 2004: Mi Mia Dek (มีเมียเด็ก)
- 2005 Phu Phae Rak (ผู้แพ้รัก)
- 2005: Ruam Phleng Dang 25 Pi 1-4 (รวมเพลงดัง 25 ปี 1-4)
- 2006: Mak Sao Sam Noi (มักสาวซำน้อย)
- 2006: Pho Mai Jai Man (พ่อหม้ายใจมาร )
- 2007: Lam Phaen Yai Ngok Ok Hak (ลำแพน ยายงก อกหัก)
- 2007: Rak Kap Pa Pha Pai Yan Hi (รักกับป๋าพาไปยันฮี)
- 2009: Phut Jing Rue Len (พูดจริงหรือเล่น)
- 2010: Maeng Wi Mai Mi Sit (แมงหวี่ไม่มีสิทธิ์)
- 2011: Kaeo Luem Khon (แก้วลืมคอน)
- 2011: 30 Pi Thong Phonsak Lam Long (30 ปีทอง พรศักดิ์ลำล่อง)
- 2012: Yut Thoet Nam Ta (หยุดเถิดน้ำตา)
- 2014: Khop Jai Ti Hak Khon Mi Mia (ขอบใจที่ฮักคนมีเมีย)
- 2016: Rak Thae Phae Thun Niyom (รักแท้แพ้ทุนนิยม)

=== Singles ===
- 2019: Fa Ngao Fon Khon Ngao Jai (ฟ้าเหงาฝน คนเหงาใจ)
- 2019: Lo Him (เลาะฮิม)
- 2019: Sa Long Bang (ซาหลงบั้ง)
- 2019: Hu Kin Taeng (หูกินแตง)
- 2019: Bai Fang (ใบฟาง)
- 2020: Sa La Wan Song Fang Khong (สาละวันสองฝั่งโขง)
- 2020: Nithan Nok Krajok (นิทานนกกระจอก)
