= Christy Gibson =

Anglo-Dutch singer

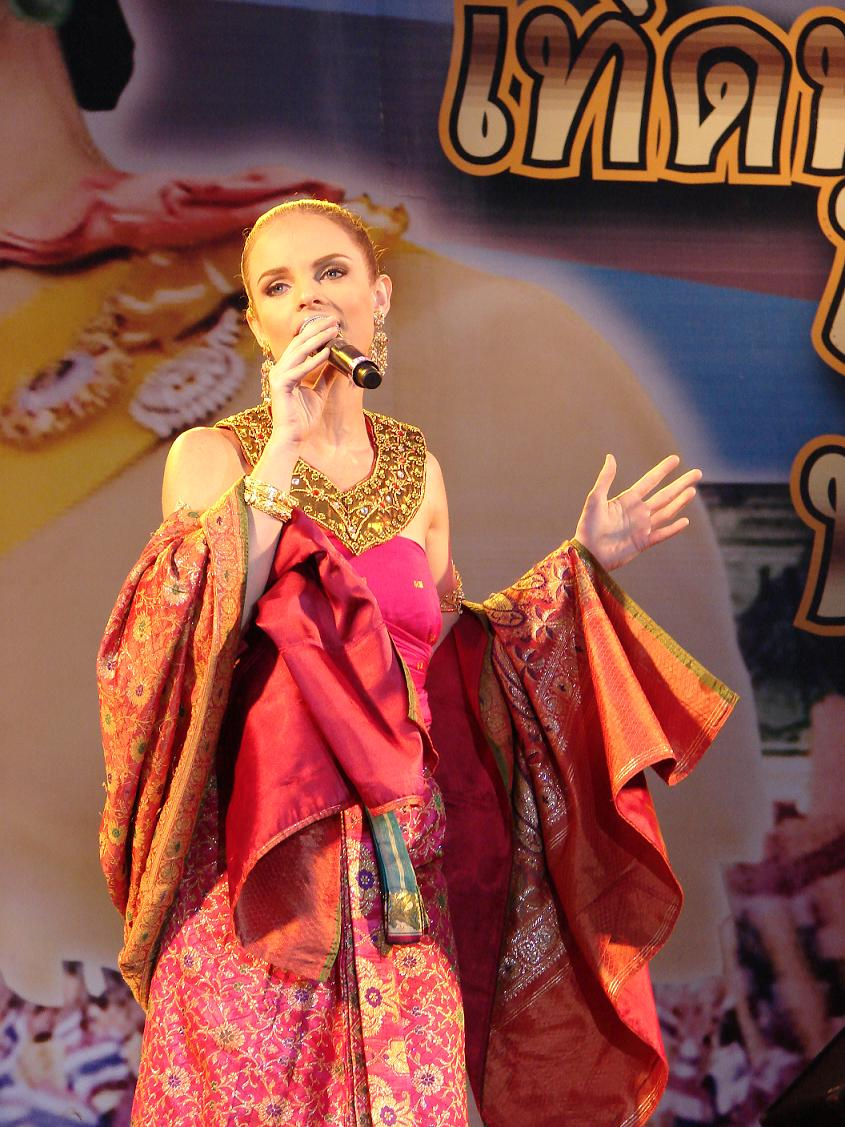
- Gibson in 2008
- Born: 28 May 1978 (age 48); Amsterdam, Netherlands
- Other name: คริสตี้ กิ๊บสัน
- Occupations: Singer, performer
- Known for: Mor lam, Luk thung

Christy Gibson (คริสตี้ กิ๊บสัน) is an Anglo-Dutch singer who was raised in Thailand, and performs in the traditional Thai musical genres ofmor lam and luk thung.

== Background ==
Gibson moved to Thailand as a child with her family when she was six years of age. They lived in Korat and then Bangkok.

She had an interest in singing and music from an early age. Growing up in up-country Thailand she began to pick up Thai songs. As a teenager, she and her family moved to Bangkok and later enrolled in a performing arts course.

== Professional career ==
Gibson was discovered in 2000, while performing a well-known Thai song. She was subsequently invited to perform on a variety of popular TV shows, including the country's premier nationally televised lukthung concert, "Wetee Thai".

Gibson released her first album, Christy Der Ka Der, in 2001 and her second, Jam Gan Boh Dai Gah?, in 2002. Gibson was signed by Sony Music Thailand in 2003, released her third album titled Gulahp Wiang Ping. During her time with Sony Music Thailand, Gibson also recorded an album jointly with Swedish luk tung singer Jonas Anderson, called Rum-tone, Rum-thai. This was followed up by two more duet albums, released independently.

In 2012 and 2011, Gibson had two consecutive hit songs. In 2010, her song "Jep Tee Mai Dai Cheun" charted all over Thailand. This was her most popular song up until that time and remained in the top of the charts for that genre for two years straight.

Her album of 2011, Yah Yohm Pae, was an anthem of hope for many during the massive floods in Thailand of that year. For this song she received the Siam Dara Star Award for the Greatest Lukthoong Song of 2011. She has also received a number of other prestigious awards throughout her career.

In 2012, Gibson released 2 more singles; Tah Lohk Mai Leua Poochai Suk Kon and Neua Koo Kohng Chun Gert Reuyung Noh. She travels and performs in concert all throughout the country commercially and for social causes and has performed internationally for a variety of cultural events throughout the world, including, but not limited to; Thailand, Laos, Taiwan, Singapore, India, Jordan, England, Switzerland, Germany, Australia and the USA.

== Discography ==
Solo albums

- Christy Der ka Der (released in 2001 under Wetee Thai)
- Jum Gun Boh Dai Gah (released in 2001 under Wetee Thai)
- Gulap Wiang Ping (released in 2004 under Sony Music, Thailand)
- Yah Yohm Pae (EP, released in 2011 independently)

Singles

- Tah Lohk Mai Leua Poochai Suk Kon (released in 2012 independently)
- Neua Koo Kohng Chun Gert Reuyung Noh (released in 2012 independently)
- Gamaloh (OST for Than Chai Gammalor, Channel 3 TV Series – released in 2016 under Channel 3)

Duet albums (with Jonas Anderson)

- Ram Tone Ram Thai (released in 2005 under Sony Music, Thailand)
- Noom Tam Lao Sao Tam Thai (released in 2007 under Mangpong)
- Jonas and Christy (released in 2009 independently)

Guest appearances

- Song: Glai Roong

Album: H.M. Blues By: His Majesty King Bhumibol Adulyadej – King of Thailand

- Song: Sai Tan Nam Pratai

Album: Mae Haeng Chat (special album produced in honor of HM Queen Sirikit's 72nd birthday) By Artist: Various Artists Remarks: Sung in duet with Jonas Anderson

== Awards ==
- Outstanding Thai Language Award: Recognition of exceptional use of the Thai Language (Awarded by the Thai Ministry of Culture) 2010
- Siam Dara Star Award: Greatest Lukthoong Song 2012 (Yah Yohm Pae)
- Award for Social Causes and Thai Culture Promotion (Awarded by the Department of Cultural Promotion, Thai Ministry of Culture) 2012
