= Jonas Anderson =

Swedish singer, active in Thailand (born 1972)

- Born: 27 August 1972 (age 52); Fryksände, Värmland, Sweden
- Occupation: Singer
- Known for: lookthung
- Website: jonasanderson.net

Jonas Anderson is a Thai-raised Swedish singer known in Thailand for singing lookthung or Thai country/folk music. He has released five solo albums so far (2012) and three duet albums with fellow non-Thai lookthung singer, Christy Gibson. Since then he has released a number of independent and collaborative singles.

== Background ==
Jonas Anderson was born on 27 August 1972 in Fryksände, Värmland, Sweden. He moved to Thailand as a child with his family in August 1981. Shortly after arriving, his family moved to the North-Eastern region of Thailand (Issan) to engage in educational projects in rural areas. Jonas Anderson had an interest in music and singing from an early age. Growing up in Thailand he started picking up the language and learning Thai songs. When Jonas was in his teens his family moved down to Bangkok, and Jonas enrolled in a performing arts course in his late teens after which he formed a group with Christy Gibson and other friends performing for various social causes, especially drug awareness programs in schools and youth centers.

== Professional career ==
Jonas Anderson's unlikely path to becoming a known lookthung or Thai country recording artist began when he and Christy Gibson were asked to sing a lookthung song for a community event. This experience sparked Jonas' interest in lookthung and he started to learn and perform more of this style of music.

A pivotal moment in Jonas' career was when he was discovered by famous TV personality Wittawat Suntornwinet, owner and host of the popular variety TV show, "At 10" or "Tee Sip". Khun Wittawat saw Jonas singing a popular lookthung song at a New Year's Eve party and consequently invited him to appear on his show. Appearing on this nationally televised prime time television show drew public attention and interest in Jonas Anderson. This was further amplified when he featured on the country's premier nationally televised lookthung concert called "Wetee Thai" paving the way for Jonas Anderson to launch a professional music career.

He entered an intensive voice training program under lookthung master, Aniwat Phanom (artist name Vilai Phanom) and finally recorded his first album, Pom Chue Jonas ("My Name is Jonas") which was released in June, 2000 under the Wetee Thai label. The album was an instant success selling over 200,000 copies.

Jonas Anderson's first album was followed by three more albums under Wetee Thai after which he was signed by Sony Music Thailand where he released one more solo album and his first duet album with Christy Gibson. After that, he released a seventh album (his second duet album) under the Mangpong label. His eighth album is one that he and Gibson produced and released independently. Along with his recording and touring career, Jonas Anderson co-hosted a television program with Christy Gibson on Channel 3 (Thailand) called Thung Banterng.

With the decline of CD sales and the advent of digital music, Jonas released a number of singles collaboratively, independently, and in connection with music labels. Of note is the song "Kwang Kao Yoo Klang Kow" released in 2014 in connection with WakeUp Music. The Official Music video of the song has over 9 million views on YouTube.

After the passing of Thailand's beloved Monarch, Bhumibol Adulyadej Jonas wrote and released an English song in His Majesty's honor named "Father King". A number of prominent Thai artists featured on the song, including Anchalee Jongkadeekij, Saranya Songsermsawad, Jirayuth Wattanasin (Joe Nuvo), Christy Gibson, Rose Sirintip Hanpradit, Max Natthawut Jenmana, and Ekkapan Wannasut.

== Discography ==
Solo albums
- Pom Chue Jonas (released in 2000 under Wetee Thai)
- Rong Oo Laeng Wao (released in 2001 under Wetee Thai)
- Jonas Mahasanook (released in 2002 under Wetee Thai)
- Rak Lae Kit Tueng (released in 2003 under Wetee Thai)
- Nakrong Panejon (released in 2004 under Sony Music, Thailand)

Duet albums (with Christy Gibson)
- Ram Tone Ram Thai (released in 2005 under Sony Music, Thailand)
- Noom Tam Lao Sao Tam Thai (released in 2007 under Mangpong)
- Jonas and Christy (released in 2009 independently)

Singles
- Kwang Kao Yoo Klang Kow (released in 2014 in connection with WakeUp Music)
- Pae Kon Na Rak (released in 2016 under G Minor Music)
- Happy Dee Mak Featuring Boom Panadda (released in 2018 independently)
- Farang Klang Klai (released in 2020 independently)
- Kwang Kao Koi Yoo Sai (released in 2021 independently)

Guest appearances
- Song: "Sai Tan Nam Pratai"
  - Album: Mae Haeng Chat (special album produced in honor of HM Queen Sirikit's 72nd birthday
  - By artist: various artists
  - Remarks: Sung in duet with Christy Gibson
- Song: "France Dant"
  - Album: Million Ways to Dobe
  - By artist: Nop Ponchamni
- Song: "Kwan Thai Jai Nueng Deow"
  - By artist: Aed Carabao
  - Remarks: Jonas featured with various artists in this song written and produced to promote unity in the south of Thailand
