= Saeng-arun Bunyu =

Thai singer

Saeng-arun Bunyu แสงอรุณ บุญยู้
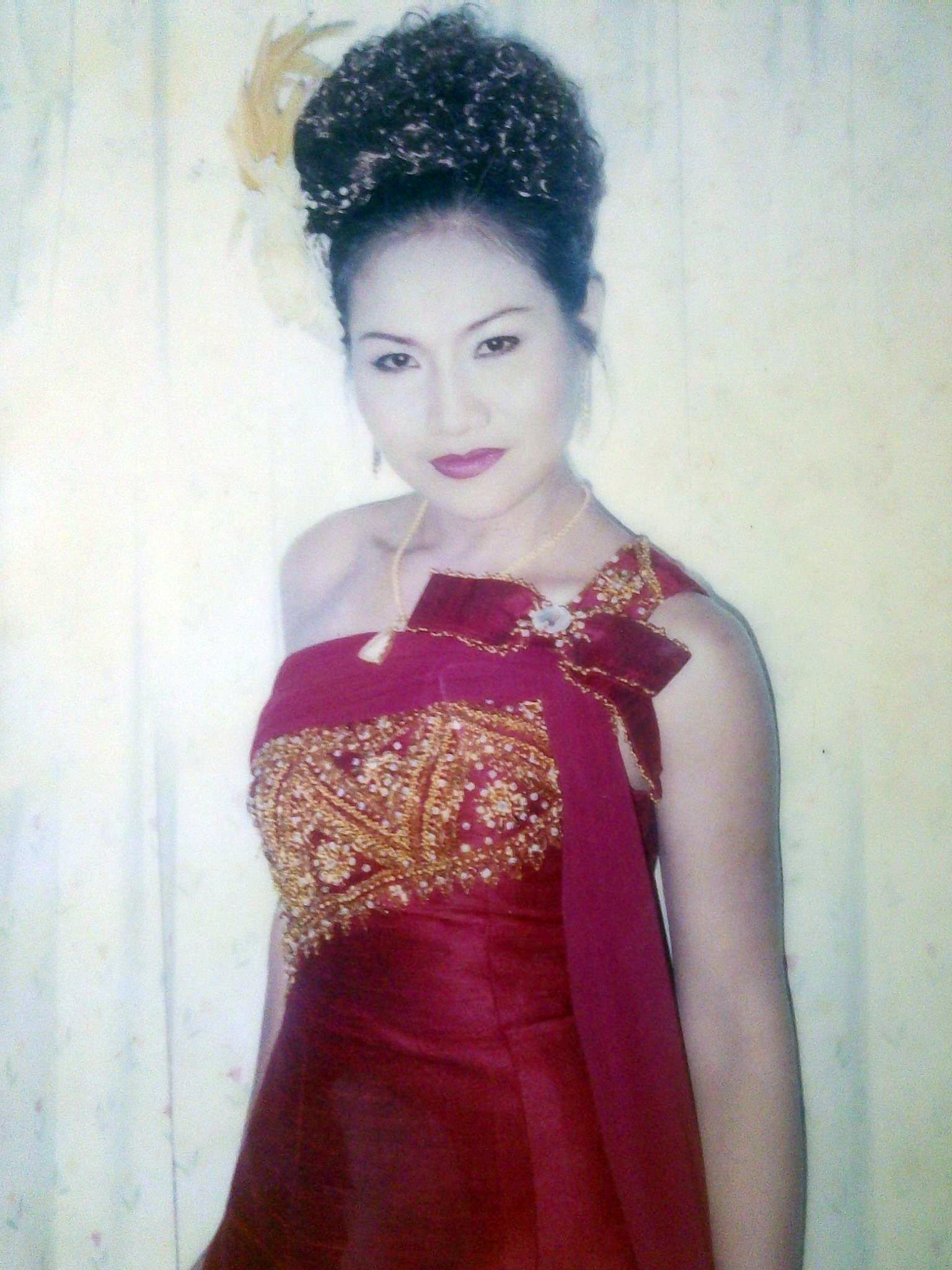

Background information
- Born: 28 November 1975 (age 50); Kalasin Province, Thailand
- Genres: Mor lam
- Occupation: Singer • Actress
- Instrument: Voice
- Years active: 1994–2009
- Labels: Topline Diamond

Saeng-arun Bunyu (Thai: แสงอรุณ บุญยู้) is a Thai female singer from Isan area. She was one of the popular and prolific artists in the Mor lam (Thai country) and Luk thung (Thai pop-country) genres between 1994 and 2009. She was a member of Mor lam band Sieng Isan (เสียงอีสาน).

== Life and music career ==
She has a nickname Tong (ต๋อง), but Sieng Isan's fan club call her Orn (อร). She was born on 28 November 1975, in Kalasin Province. She was introduced to stage in 1994 by a member of Sieng Isan. She was a main singer for Sieng Isan, with Maithai Huajaisilp and Lookphrae Uraiporn.

In 1997, she released an album in a mor lam group See Sao Dao Rung with Jakkajan Daoprai, Rerai Dao-Isan, and Pandam Khamkhoon.

In 2001, she was popularised by songs Kor Moon Mark Mai Yark Rak and Rak Phang Lang Songkran, written by Dao Bandon. In 2017, the song Kor Moon Mark Mai Yark Rak was covered by Dalar Thanyaporn.

== Retirement ==
In 2009, she retired from entertainment because of a stroke, and was treated in her birthplace.
