= Lao music =

Music genre

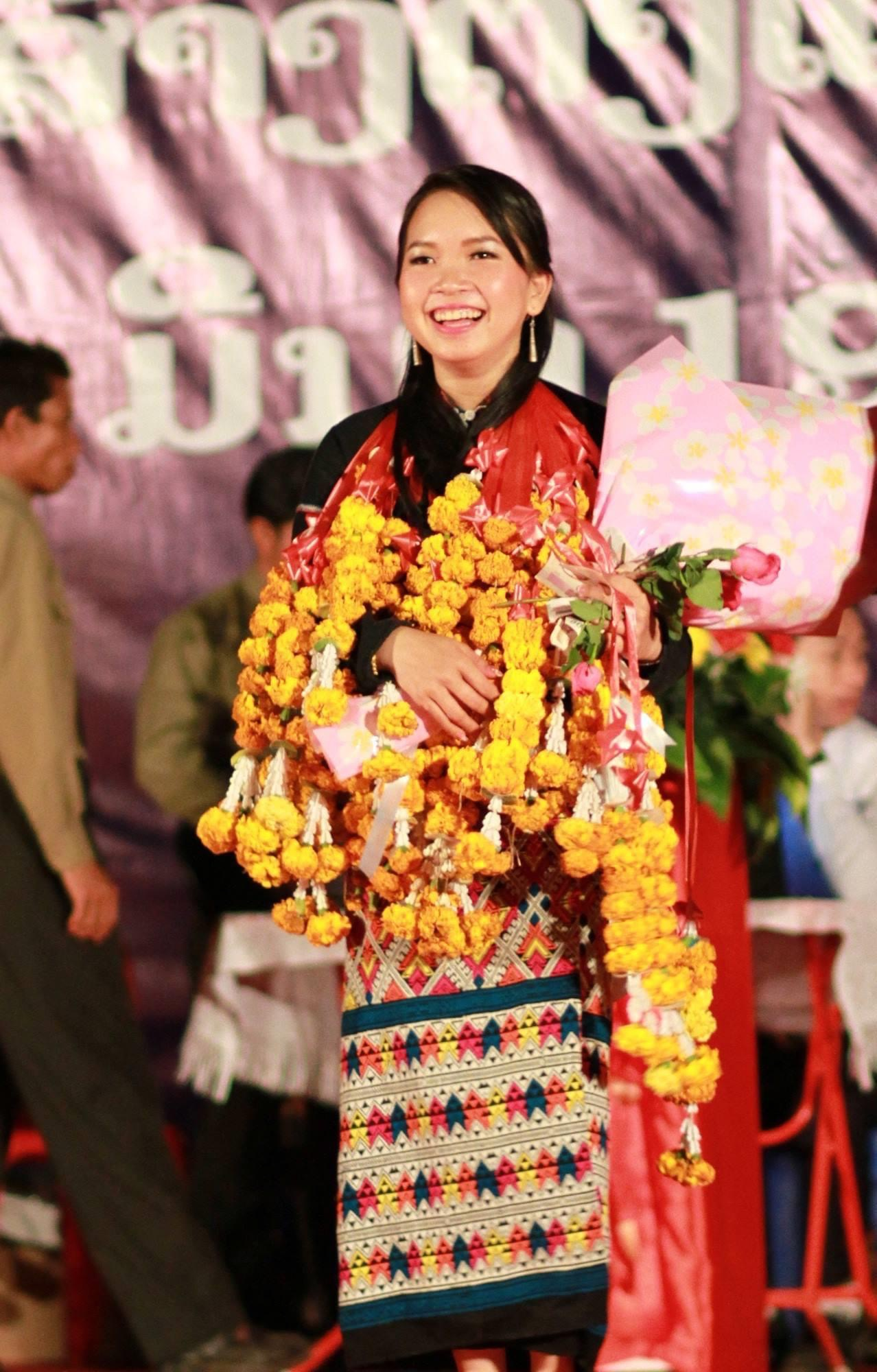
Moukdavanh Santiphone

Traditional Lao music can be divided into classical and folk forms.

== Khene ==
The Khene (Lao: ແຄນ) is the instrument most identified with Laotian music. A national proverb says that "a person living under a stilted house, eating sticky rice, listening to any music related to Lam (Lao: ລຳ) or Morlam, and playing the Khene is likely to be Lao or associated with Lao people."

Khenes are made from a special kind of bamboo. It looks slightly Andean in appearance with its sets of bamboo and reed pipes of various lengths, which are strapped together, and then blown into by the player. It can be played solo as in traditional Lao music or in combination with other musical instruments to accompany modern songs.

== Lao Musicians ==
Vichai Sitviseth, ວິຈັຍ ສິຕວິເສສ/ วิจัย สิตวิเสส As 2023, Vichai Sitviseth is active as Lao Artist, Singer/Song-Writer from Chicago, Illinois USA. His music History:in 1989 Vichai had formed a live Band/Lukthung Neerankalวงดนตรี ลูกทุ่งนิรันดร์กาล as a lead Vocal/guitar in Rockford, Illinois USA. 2000-2005 he joined as a singer วงดนตรี RED ROSE/กุหลาบแดง and SEXY200/แซ็กซี2000 in Santa Rose, California USA. 2005-2009 he had toured music shows for ก วิเสส Koviseth and คำตุ่น วงสนิส Khamtoun and formed Rajasinh Band/วงดนตรี ราชาสิงห์ in Sacramento, California.

Lao music today comes in a wide variety of styles and from different national origins. Outside of Laos, Lao music is mainly created in the United States, France and Canada. An increasing amount of transnational Lao (alternative) rock, pop and hip hop created a new 'oeuvre' next to the traditional Lao music like morlam.

Most notable Lao hip hop artists from the US are Supasang a.k.a. Buc Supa, 'gangsta rapper' Gumby AKA Pryce, Lil Yank from South Carolina, and Goof Loc from Fort Smith, Arkansas. Both rappers, Gumby and Supasang, made music videos and both rap in Lao language.

The most famous Lao artist from France is Willy Denzey, a R&B singer who started his singing career in 2001 and achieved success with his hits "Le mur du son", "L'Orphelin" and "Et si tu n'existais pas" and his successful albums #1 and

== Classical music ==
The Lao classical orchestra can be divided into two categories, Sep Nyai and Sep Noi (or Mahori). The Sep Nyai is similar to Piphat, and is ceremonial and formal music and includes: two sets of gongs (khong vông), a xylophone (ranat), an oboe (pei or salai), two large kettle drums and two sets of cymbals (sing, similar to Thai ching). The Sep Noi, capable of playing popular tunes, includes two bowed string instruments, the So U and the So I, also known to the Indians. These instruments are similar to the Thai Saw u and Saw duang, respectively. They have a long neck or fingerboard and a small sound box; this sound box is made of bamboo in the So U and from a coconut in the So I. Both instruments have two strings, and the bow is slid between these two strings, which are tuned at a fifth apart and always played together. Furthermore, this mahori or sep noi ensemble (the sep nyai is strictly percussion and oboe) may include several khene. In this respect, it differs markedly from the mahori orchestras of Cambodia and Siam.

Some ethnomusicologists believe the ancient art music of the Khmer people has been best preserved in Laos—along with diverse forms of folk music related to the oldest types of Indian music—music that has largely disappeared in India itself. They claim to find in Laos a scale the ancient Hindus called the "celestial scale," the Gandhara grama—which is a tempered heptatonic scale, or a division of the octave into seven equal parts.

The Royal Lao Orchestra, consisting of musicians of the former court of the king of Laos, who fled Laos following the communist takeover in 1975, now reside in Knoxville and Nashville, Tennessee, United States.

== Folk music ==
Lao folk music, known as Lam, is extemporaneous singing accompanied by the khene. It is popular both in Laos and Thailand, where there is a large ethnic Lao population. Moukdavanyh Santiphone is folk singer, who in 2015 was the most viewed Laotian musician on YouTube.

== History of Lao music in Thailand ==
Following the Siamese conquest of Laos in 1828 and the subsequent dispersion of the Lao population into Siam (Central Thailand), Lao music became fashionable there. Sir John Bowring, an envoy from Great Britain, described a meeting with the deputy king (ouparaja) of Siam in 1855 in which his host performed on the Lao khene; at a meeting two days later he entertained Bowring with Lao dancers and khene music. The Chronicles of the Fourth Reign said the deputy king enjoyed playing the khene and "could perform the Lao type of dance and could skillfully perform the Lao comedy-singing. It is said that if one did not actually see his royal person, one would have thought the singer were a real Lao."

Immediately after the deputy king's death in 1865, King Mongkut made known his fear that Lao musical culture would supplant Siamese genres and therefore banned Lao musical performances in a proclamation in which he complained that, "Both men and women now play Lao khene (mo lam) throughout the kingdom...Lao khene is always played for the topknot cutting ceremony and for ordinations. We cannot give the priority to Lao entertainments. Thai have been performing Lao khene for more than ten years now and it has become very common. It is apparent that wherever there is an increase in the playing of Lao khene there is also less rain."

In recent years Lao popular music has made inroads into Thailand through the success of contemporary Lao musicians Alexandria, L.O.G. and CELLS. CELLS second Lao album 'Saew' was released by Thai label GMM / Grammy in 2007 and received top 20 radio airplay in Bangkok for hit singles 'Waan' and 'Leuk Leuk'. Music videos for 'Waan' and 'Leuk Leuk' have also proved very popular on Thai music video channels and CELLS have made several well received tours of Thailand to promote the album.
