= Ekkapan Wannasut =

Thai singer

Ekkapan Wannasut is a Thai singer and winner of KPN Award Thailand singing contest in 2010. He is from Roi Et and is a former recipient of a scholarship (that was under the royal patronage of Princess Galyani Vadhana) at Rangsit University.
