= Jonas Andersson (football manager) =

Swedish footballer (born 1975)

Personal information
- Date of birth: 30 March 1975 (age 51)
- Height: 1.74 m (5 ft 9 in)
- Position: Midfielder

Senior career*
Years	Team	Apps	(Gls)
1990–1999	Mjällby AIF		
2000–2002	Hammarby IF	45	(1)
2003	IFK Norrköping		
2003–2006	Mjällby AIF		
2006–2007	Ifö Bromölla IF		
2008	IF Sylvia		

Managerial career
- 2016–2018: Mjällby AIF
- * Club domestic league appearances and goals

Jonas Andersson (born 30 March 1975) is a Swedish footballer who played as a midfielder. He played for Hammarby IF in Allsvenskan, but spent most of his playing career at Mjällby AIF, which he also managed.

He is a son of "Mr. Mjällby", Sven-Bertil Andersson.

== Managing career ==
Mjällby suffered two straight relegations in 2014 and 2015, finding themselves on the third tier. Mjällby did not start the 2016 season well either, and manager Patrik Rosengren tended his resignation. Jonas Andersson took over. He managed to save the team, which escaped relegation in the very last league round. Already during the summer of 2017, there were rumours of Andersson leaving to become manager of a bigger club. In his first full season, the 2017 Division 1, Andersson steered the team to playoffs for the Superettan, where they lost to Örgryte however.

In June 2018, Andersson suddenly resigned for "private reasons". Andersson left a well-adjusted team leading the table for assistant Milos Milojevic to take over, and Mjällby ended up winning the 2018 Division 1.
