= Klon (poetry) =

Thai and Lao poetic form

The klon, also spelled glawn or gaun (Thai: กลอน, [klɔ̄ːn]; Lao: ກອນ, [kɔ̀ːn]), is a Thai/Lao term referring to either poetic verse in general, or a specific prosodic form in Thai and Lao poetry.

== Thai ==
In the narrow meaning of the term, the klon is a more recently developed form of Thai poetry where a stanza has four wak (lines), each with the same number of syllables. It became the most popular form during the early Rattanakosin period, and is usually considered an original Thai form, as opposed to older forms such as kap which originated from Indic or Cambodian poetry. The klon metres are named by the number of syllables in a wak, e.g. klon hok (กลอนหก, [klɔ̄ːn hòk]) has six syllables per wak (hok means six). All metres have the same rhyming scheme, and there are also requirements on the tone of the final syllable of each wak. The klon is also divided into several types according to their manner of composition, with klon suphap (กลอนสุภาพ, [klɔ̄ːn sù.pʰâːp]) being the basic form.

The following plan shows the structure of klon suphap (two stanzas) in the most common eight-syllable variety, which was employed extensively by Sunthorn Phu, and is the most common form of the Rattanakosin period. The letters in parentheses represent alternative rhyming syllables. In practice, occasional wak with seven or nine syllables are also acceptable.

$\mathrm{OOO \,\, OO \,\, OOAC}$	$\mathrm{OOA \,\, O(A) \,\, OOBC}$
$\mathrm{OOO \,\, OO \,\, OOBC}$	$\mathrm{OOB \,\, O(B) \,\, OOCC}$
$\mathrm{OOO \,\, OO \,\, OOD}$	$\mathrm{OOD \,\, O(D) \,\, OOCC}$
$\mathrm{OOO \,\, OO \,\, OOC}$	$\mathrm{OOC \,\, O(C) \,\, OOOC}$

== Lao ==
In the Lao context, the glawn is commonly used in song, and is the most common text in traditional mor lam. It is made up of four-line stanzas, each with seven basic syllables (although sung glawn often includes extra, unstressed syllables). There is a set pattern for the tone marks to be used at various points in the stanza, plus rhyme schemes to hold the unit together. Performances of glawn are typically memorised rather than improvised.
