= Mor lam =

Lao and Thai music genre

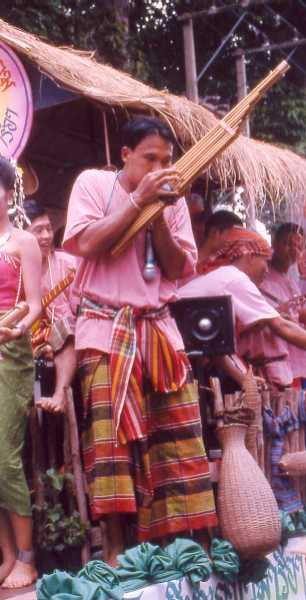
A khaen player in Isan

Mor lam (Lao: ໝໍລຳ; Thai/Isan: หมอลำ [mɔ̌ː lám]; Thai: หมอลำ, RTGS: mo lam, [mɔ̌ː lām]) is a traditional Lao form of song originating in Laos that is also popular in Isan, where the majority of the population is ethnic Lao.

Morlam (or molam) is a traditional storytelling and entertainment form in the Southeast Asian country of Laos, and the northeastern part of Thailand (formerly part of Laos), known as Isaan.

The term molam is a combination of the term mo, meaning “master,” and lam, meaning to sing in a style called lam. Literally then, molam means “master of the lam singing style,” but the term is also used more generally to performances in the lam genre. It refers to both the music and the artist. Other romanisations used include mor lum, maw lam, maw lum, moh lam, mhor lum, and molum. In Laos, both the music and singer is called mor lam (ໝໍລຳ), and when referencing the subgenre/ region of origin, the term "lam" is used, followed by the subgenre/region name.

The characteristic feature of lam singing is the use of a flexible melody tailored to the tones of the words in the text. Traditionally, the tune was developed by the singer as an interpretation of a klon poem and accompanied primarily by the khene (a free reed mouth organ). The modern form is frequently composed and uses electrified instruments. Traditional forms (and some Lao genres) use a slower tempo than the quicker tempo and faster deliveries of more modern lam music. Strong rhythmic accompaniments, vocal leaps, and a conversational style of singing distinguish lam from American rap.

Typically featuring a theme of unrequited love, mor lam often reflects the difficulties of life in rural Isan and Laos, leavened with wry humour. In its heartland, performances are an essential part of festivals and ceremonies. Lam has gained a profile outside its native regions from the spread of migrant workers, for whom it remains an important cultural link with home.

== Appellation ==
In Laos, morlam / mor lam/ molam /mo lam refers to the traditional folk music genre and also the singer, and when referencing the subgenre, the word ລຳ, lam /lám/ is used followed by the specific genre/beat/region name, ex: lam salavan. In northern Laos, the regional folk music styles are referred to as ຂັບ, khap /kʰáp/, and signifies 'to sing' or a 'song'. The Lao-speaking people across the river in Isan call the music หมอลำ, mo lam, /mɔ̌ː lám/, Laos, the equivalent term ໝໍລຳ, molam /mɔ̌ː lám/Lao ໝໍ and Isan หมอ, both mo /mɔ̌ː/, (as well as Thai หมอ, mo /mɔ̌ː/) refers specifically to an 'expert', 'shaman', or 'doctor'. The northern Lao terms ขับ, khap /kʰáp/ and mokhap /mɔ̌ː kʰáp/, are not used in Isan, but are likely still used in some Lao-speaking parts of Loei, Uttaradit, and Phitsanulok that were settled by people originally from northern Laos, however, khap is understood as a rarer word for 'to sing' or 'song' and in reference to specifically northern styles of lam. Northern Lao areas refer to the khène/khaen player as the mokhène/mokhaen just as in the rest of Laos and Isan.

In standard Thai, the music and the singer, as adopted from Isan usage, is also known as หมอลำ, molam, but because of the tone differences is generally pronounced /mɔ̌ː làm/. It is also common to "correct" or "translate" the Isan term into standard Thai as หมอรำ, mo ram /mɔ̌ː ram/, as Thai รำ, ram /ram/, is cognate to Lao ລຳ and Isan ลำ and shares the same meaning. Although Thai ขับ khap /kʰàp/

== Instrumentation ==
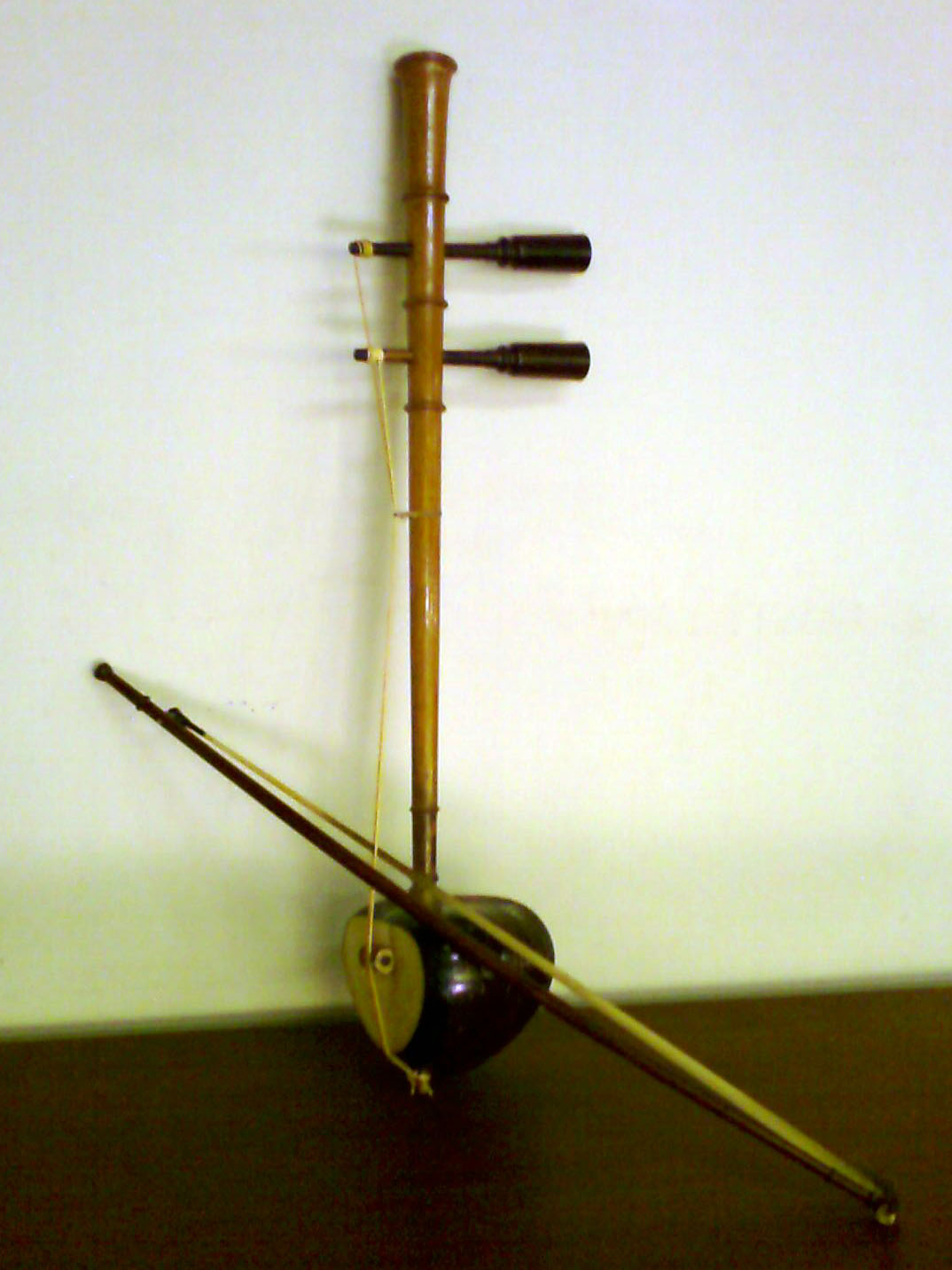
The xo ou (BGN/PCGN)/so u (RTGS), the low-pitched fiddles common in some styles of lam from southern Laos and most of northeastern Thailand.

As the lowland areas of Laos and Isan are essentially one shared cultural region of Lao people, few differences, especially at its most traditional level, are present to distinguish traditional forms on either side. Throughout the Lao-speaking heartlands, the only accompaniment to performances of khap and lam was the local free reed mouth-organ, the khène (BGN/PCGN)/khaen (RTGS). Similar in many ways to the function of the bagpipe in the Scottish Highlands, the khène/khaen provides not only the melody but can also be used to provide a drone as it is played with circular breathing. So important is the khène/khaen in Lao music, the instrument even came to be used in the Lao classical music ensemble known as sép noy (BGN/PCGN)/sep noi (RTGS), where most of the instruments are influenced by the veneer of Indian musical traditions as well as classical musical traditions of neighboring Thailand, Cambodia, and Java.

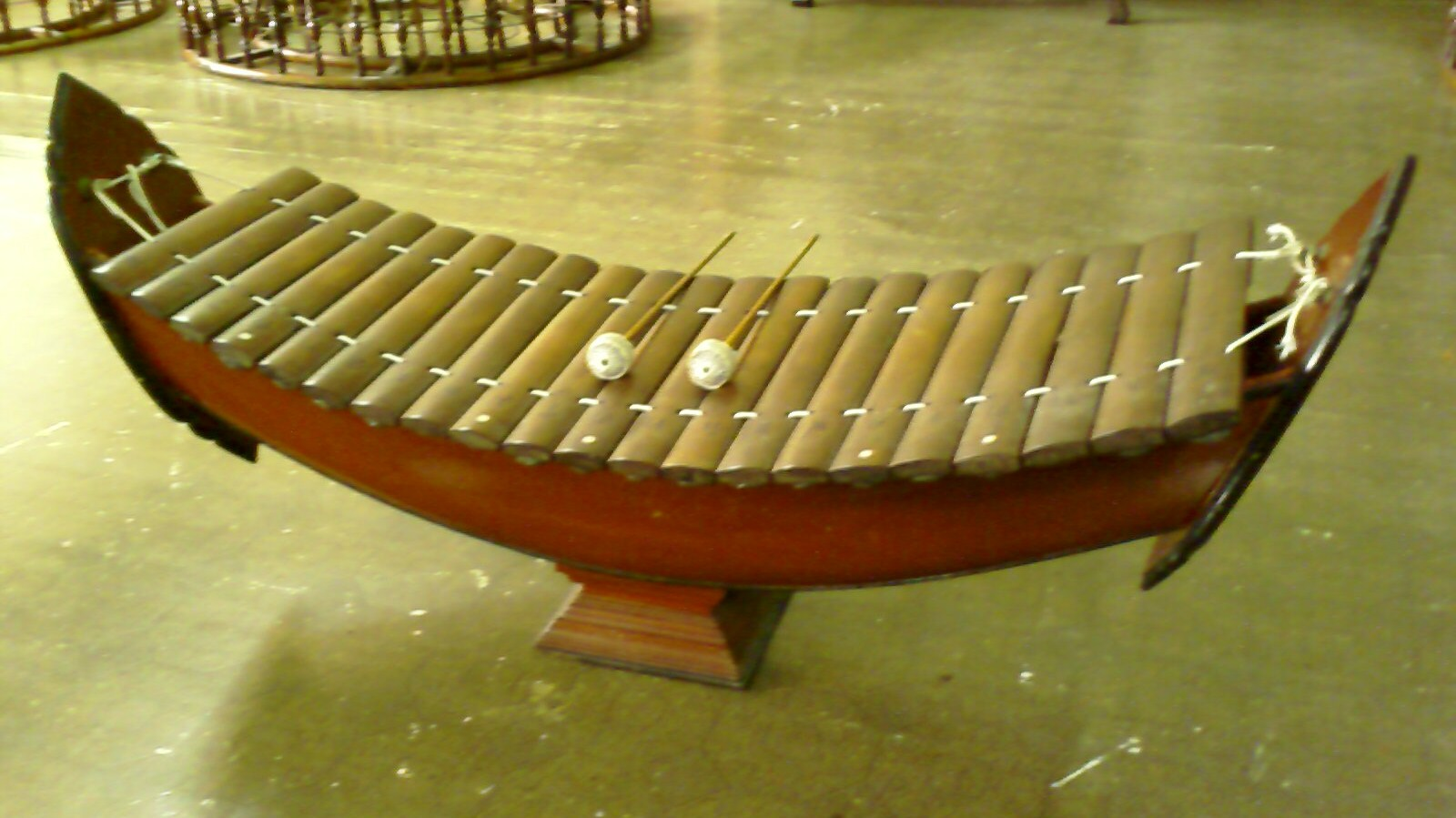
A lanat ék/ranat ék (BGN/PCGN)/ranat ek (RTGS), a xylophone used in some varieties of khap and lam. The many types of lanat/ranat are also used in classical Lao music.

In lam styles of central and southern Laos and most of Isan, traditional performances often included ensembles. Most northern khap styles relied solely on the khène/khaen, except for a few styles, such as those from Luang Phrabang, many of which were adaptations of the local classical music traditions as the city was the seat of the Lao monarchy until its forced abdication in 1975. The southern lam styles, heavily influenced by the ancient musical traditions of the Mon-Khmer peoples, such as the Mon, Khmer, Kuy and Bru that either were the former inhabitants or continue to live amongst the Tai peoples that now make up the majority in the Lao-speaking region.

Most modern styles, including the northern khap varieties, are generally heard with ensembles consisting of a mixture of Western instruments and traditional ones. Contemporary ensembles often feature instruments such as:

1. Electric Guitars (Effects: Chorus, Wah Wah / Technique: Tremolo)
2. Electric Bass (Technique: Slap, Expressive, Slide (either as sound effect/VST or glissando on the instrument)
3. Drum Kit / Drum Set (tends to pan in the audience perspective because of the drum VST), Percussion (known to have congas, cowbells, ching, and chab)
4. Accordions (Sound: Musette or Detuned)
5. Saxophones (Type: Alto, Tenor / Techniques: Vibrato, Trill)
6. Violins, and/or String Orchestra (Type: Slow or Sustain Strings / Technique: Legato)
7. Keyboard/organs (such as the Hammond for Rock genre use, Farfisa Combo Organs, and Yamaha YC Combo)

Traditional instruments in mor lam/lam Lao
Lao BGN/PCGN	Lao	Thai RTGS	Isan	Thai	Description
pi	ປີ່ /pīː/	pi	ปี่ /píː/	ปี่ /pìː/	Class of four-reed oboes.
vôt	ໂຫວດ /wȍːt/	wot	โหวด /wòːt/	โหวด /wòːt/	A circular panpipe.
khouy	ຂຸ່ຍ/ຂຸ່ຽ /kʰūj/	khlui	ขลุ่ย /kʰūj/	ขลุ่ย /klùj/	Class of reedless, single- or double-reed flutes.
hun/hune	ຫືນ /hɯ̌ːn/	chongnong	หืน /hɯ̌ːn/ (RTGS huen)	จ้องหน่อง /tɕɔ̂ŋ nɔ̀ŋ/	Bamboo Jew's harp or jaw harp
chakhé	ຈະເຂ້ /tɕáʔ kʰȅː/	chakhe	จะเข้ /tɕǎʔ kʰèː/	จะเข้ /tɕàʔ kʰê/	A type of zither.
xo	ຊໍ /sɔ́ː/	so	ซอ /sɔ᷇ː/	ซอ /sɔ̄ː/	Class of fiddle instruments. Most common is the xo ou/so u ຊໍອູ້/ซออู้ /sɔ́ː ʔûː/ or Thai /sɔ̄ː ʔûː/ and the xo i/so i ຊໍອີ/ซออี /sɔ́ː ʔìː/ (RTGS so i), known in Thai as the ซอด้วง /sɔː dûaŋ/.
hai xong	ໄຫຊອງ /hăj sɔ́ːŋ/	hai song	ไหซอง /hăj sɔ᷇ːŋ/	ไหซอง /hăj sɔ̄ːŋ/	Series of different sized earthenware jugs with a taught string over its mouth which are plucked or struck. Traditional lam performances often feature a female dancer that pretends to play the hai xong/hai song.
kachappi	ກະຈັບປີ່ /káʔ tɕáp pīː/	krachappi	กระจับปี่ /kǎʔ tɕǎp píː/	กระจับปี่ /kràʔ tɕàp pìː/	A two-stringed, four-coursed lute no longer commonly used.
sing	ສິ່ງ /sīŋ/	ching	ฉิ่ง /sīŋ/	ฉิ่ง /tɕʰìŋ/	Cymbal-like instrument used for tempo.
xap	ຊາບ /sȃːp/	chap	ฉาบ /sàːp/	ฉาบ /tɕʰàːp/	Cymbal-like instrument used for tempo but attached with a chord.
phin	ພິນ /pʰín/	phin	พิณ /pʰi᷇n/	พิณ /pʰīn/	A small mandolin that is plucked with the other hand unique to Lao/Isan music.
khim	ຂິມ /kʰǐm/	khim	ขิม /kʰǐm/	ขิม /kʰǐm/	A hammered dulcimer adopted from Chinese music, but has a distinctly local, softer sound, often used in styles descended from Lao classical music.
kap	ກັບ /káp/	krap	กรับ /kǎp/	กรับ /kràp/	A wooden clapper used to keep the tempo. Also known in Lao as ໄມ້ໂປກແປກ/ไม้โป๊กแป๊ก mai pôkpèk (BGN/PCGN)/mai pokpaek (RTGS) /mâj pȍːk pɛ̏ːk/ or Thai ไม้โป๊กแป๊ก /máj póːk pɛ́ːk/ and takes its name from the onomatopoeia for striking wood with a hammer.
khong	ຄ້ອງ /kʰɔ̑ːŋ/	khong	ฆ้อง /kʰɔ̑ːŋ/	ฆ้อง /kʰɔ́ːŋ/	A class of small, handheld gong instruments.
khong wong	ຄ້ອງວົງ /kʰɔ̑ːŋ wóŋ/	khong wong	ฆ้องวง /kʰɔ̂ːŋ wo᷇ŋ/	ฆ้องวง /kʰɔ́ːŋ wōŋ/	Similar to a gamelan, consists of a set of gongs struck with mallets, used in styles of khap and lam adapted from Lao classical music. Usually the khong vông gnai (BGN/PCGN)/khong wong yai (RTGS) and khong vông noy/khong wong noi, or 'large khong vông' or 'small khong vông,' respectively.
kong	ກອງ /kɔ̀ːŋ/	klong	กลอง /kɔ̄ːŋ/	กลอง /klɔ̄ːŋ/	Refers to a class of various drums.
ranat/lanat	ຣະນາດ/ລະນາດ /lāʔ nȃːt/	ranat	ระนาด /làʔ nâːt/	ระนาด /ráʔ nâːt/	A class of xylophone instruments, including the famous pônglang (BGN/PCGN)/ponglang (RTGS) of Isan.
mai ngop ngèp	ໄມ້ງອບແງບ /mȃj ŋɔ̑ːp ŋɛ̑ːp/	mai ngop ngaep	ไม้งอบแงบ /mȃj ŋɔ̑ːp ŋɛ̑ːp/	ไม้งอบแงบ /máj ŋɔ̂ːp ŋɛ̂ːp/	A clapper of southern Laos but also contains notched grooves that function like the güiro of Latin America.
pông	ໂປງ /pòːŋ/	pong	โปง /pōːŋ/	โปง /pōːŋ/	A bamboo rattle used as a cowbell by farmers for domestic cattle and water buffalo.
ko	ເກາະ /kɔ́ʔ/	kro	เกราะ /kɔ̌ʔ/	เกราะ /krɔ̀ʔ/	A small bamboo section of hollow bamboo with a slit cut on one side, struck with a stick. Originally used to call the cattle or water buffalo back from the pastures.
sakmong	ສາກມອງ /sȁːk mɔ́ːŋ/	krong	สากมอง /sàːk mɔ᷇ːŋ/ (RTGS sakmong)	โกร่ง /kròːŋ/	A large bamboo pestle used for husking or milling rice, played by stamping the floor but can also be tapped with sticks to maintain the beat, also used to keep rowers in long boats in unison.

== History ==
In the late 18th and 19th centuries, the music of Laos began to spread into the Thai heartland, extending Lao influence to Siam. Forced population transfers from Laos into the newly acquired region of Isan and what is now Central Thailand accelerated the rapid adoption of mor lam. Even King Mongkut's vice-king Pinklao became enamoured of it. But in 1857, following the vice-king's death, Mongkut banned public performances, citing the threat it posed to Thai culture and its alleged role in causing a drought. Performance of mor lam thereafter was a largely local affair, confined to events such as festivals in Isan and Laos. However, as Isan people began to migrate throughout the rest of the country, the music came with them. The first major mor lam performance of the 20th century in Bangkok took place at the Rajadamnern Stadium in 1946. Even then, the number of migrant workers from Isan was fairly small, and mor lam was paid little attention by the outside world.

In the 1950s and 1960s, there were attempts in both Thailand and Laos to appropriate lam for political purposes. The USIS in Thailand and both sides in the Laotian Civil War (the "Secret War") recruited mor lam singers to insert propaganda into their performances, in hopes persuading the rural population to support their cause. The Thai attempt was unsuccessful, taking insufficient account of performers' practices and the audiences' demands, but it was more successful in Laos. The victorious Communists continued to maintain a propaganda troupe even after seizing power in 1975.

Mor lam started to spread in Thailand in the late-1970s and early-1980s, when more and more people left rural Isan to seek work. Mor lam performers began to appear on television, led by Banyen Rakgaen, and the music soon gained a national profile. It remains an important link to home for Isan migrants in the capital city, where mor lam clubs and karaoke bars are meeting places for those newly arrived. Though Mor lam spread in Thailand, it was popular only among the ethnic Lao people from Isan, and not Thai people, as this type of music was viewed as inferior; In Bangkok, it was viewed as music for the low class or rural people.

Contemporary mor lam is very different from that of previous generations. None of the traditional Isan genres is commonly performed today; instead singers perform three-minute songs combining lam segments with luk thung or pop style sections, while comedians perform skits between blocks of songs. Mor lam sing performances typically consist of medleys of luk thung and lam songs, with electric instruments dominant and bawdy repartee. Sing comes from the English word 'racing' (a reference to the music's origin among Isan's biker fraternity; pai sing means 'to go racing about on motorbikes').

== Criticism ==
Thai academic Prayut Wannaudom has argued that modern mor lam is increasingly sexualised and lacking in the moral teachings which it traditionally conveyed, and that commercial pressures encourage rapid production and imitation rather than quality and originality. On the other hand, these adaptations have allowed mor lam not only to survive, but itself spread into the rest of Thailand and internationally, validating Isan and Lao culture and providing role-models for the young.

Professor Charles F. Keyes argues for the value of the ancient forms as geomythology: "The Thai-Lao people of northeastern Thailand have a well-developed tradition of 'legends' (nithān) which has been perpetuated in past through the media of folk opera ... known as mō lam mū ... no small number record[ing] events which happened 'long ago' on the Khorat Plateau... [N]ot historical accounts, they are not totally lacking in historical value. A number ... make reference to places which can be identified as being the sites of the ancient towns.... [T]he literature of the region has yet to be fully inventoried, much less analyzed", and adds in a footnote: "Unfortunately, most of these publications have had little circulation outside of the folk opera troupes for which they were intended." He next comments on five toponyms mentioned in the myth of Phadaeng and Nang Ai, and compares these with those in the "Accounts of Fā Dāēet-Song Yāng".

== Forms ==
There are many forms of mor lam. There can be no definitive list as they are not mutually exclusive, while some forms are confined to particular localities or have different names in different regions. Typically the categorisation is by region in Laos and by genre in Isan, although both styles are popular in the other region. The traditional forms of Isan are historically important, but are now rarely heard:

- lam phi fa (ລຳຜີຟ້າ, ลำผีฟ้า, IPA: [lám pʰǐː fâː]) — a ritual to propitiate spirits in cases of possession. Musically it derived from lam tang yao; however, it was performed not by trained musicians but by those (most commonly old women) who thought themselves to have been cured by the ritual.
- mor lam kon (ໝໍລຳກອນ, หมอลำกลอน, IPA: [mɔ̌ː.lám kɔ̀ːn]) — a vocal "battle" between the sexes. In Laos it is known as lam tat. Performances traditionally lasted all night, and consisted of first two, then three parts:
  - lam tang san (ລຳທາງສ້ັນ, ลำทางสั้น, IPA: [lám tʰáːŋ sān]) — ("short form") took up the bulk of the time, with the singers delivering gon poems a few minutes in length, performing alternately for about half an hour each from evening until about an hour before dawn. They would pretend gradually to fall in love, sometimes with rather explicit sexual banter.
  - lam tang nyao (ລຳທາງຍາວ, ลำทางยาว, IPA: [lám tʰáːŋ ɲáːw]) — ("long form"), a representation of the lovers' parting performed slowly and in a speech rhythm for about a quarter of an hour.
  - lam toei (ລຳເຕີ້ຍ, ลำเต้ย, IPA: [lám tɤ̂j]) — was introduced in the mid-20th century. Similar in length to the lam tang nyao, it is fast and light-hearted, with metrical texts falling into three categories: toei thammada ("normal toei"), using gon texts in Isan; toei Phama ("Burmese toei"), using central or northern Thai texts and forms; and toei Khong ("Mekong toei"), again central or northern Thai in origin. It uses the same scale as lam yao.
- lam chotkae or lam chot (ລຳໂຈດແກ້, ลำโจทย์แก้, IPA: IPA: [lám tɕòːt.kɛ̂ː] or ລຳໂຈທຍ໌, ลำโจทย์, IPA: [lám.tɕòːt]) is a variant of lam kon formerly popular in the Khon Kaen area, in which the singers (often both male) asked one another questions on general knowledge topics — religion, geography, history etc. — trying to catch out their opponent.
- mor lam mu (ໝໍລຳໝູ່, หมอลำหมู่, IPA: [mɔ̌ː.lám mūː]) — folk opera, developed in the mid-20th century. Lam mu is visually similar to central Thai likay, but the subject matter (mainly Jataka stories) derived from lam rueang (the subgenre of lam phuen) and the music from lam tang nyao. It was originally more serious than lam plern and required more skilled performers, but in the late-20th century the two converged to a style strongly influenced by central Thai and Western popular music and dance. Both have now declined in popularity and are now rare.
- mor lam phoen (ໝໍລຳເພີນ, หมอลำเพลิน, IPA: [mɔ̌ː.lám pʰɤ́ːn]) — a celebratory narrative, performed by a group. It originated around the same time as lam mu, but used a more populist blend of song and dance. The material consisted of metrical verses sung in the yao scale, often with a speech-rhythm introduction.
- lam phuen (ລຳພື້ນ, ลำพื้น, IPA: [lám.pʰɯ̂ːn]) — recital of local legends or Jataka stories, usually by a male singer, with khene accompaniment. In the sub-genre of lam rueang (ລຳເຣື່ອງ, ลำเรื่อง, IPA: [lám.rɯ̄aŋ]), sometimes performed by women, the singer acts out the various characters in costume. Performance of one complete story can last for one or two whole nights. This genre is now extremely rare, and may be extinct.

== Regional styles ==
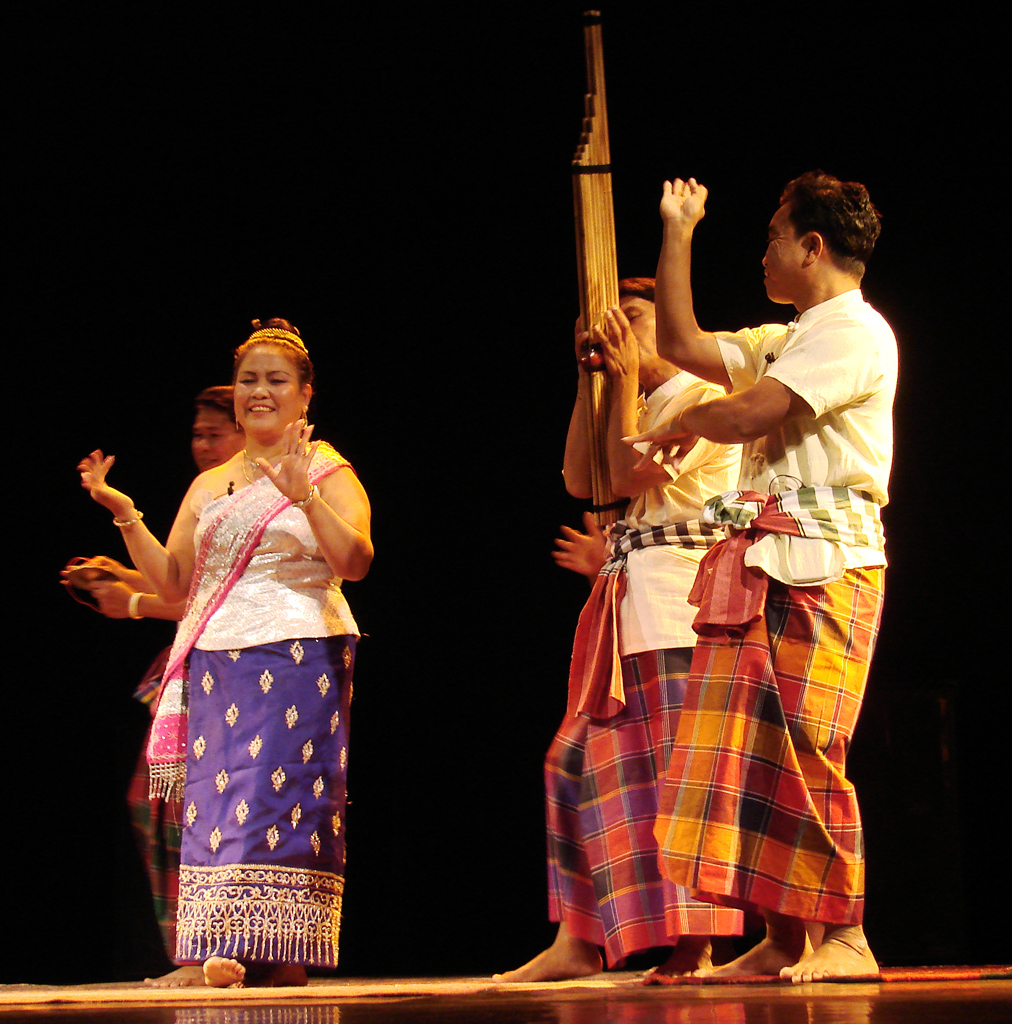
Mor lam performance-the men are playing the khene and wearing pha sarong

Isan has regional styles, but these are styles of performance rather than separate genres. The most important of the styles were Khon Kaen and Ubon, each taking their cue from the dominant form of lam gon in their area: the lam jotgae of Khon Kaen, with its role of displaying and passing on knowledge in various fields, led to a choppy, recitative-style delivery, while the love stories of Ubon promoted a slower and more fluent style. In the latter half of the 20th century the Ubon style came to dominate; the adaptation of Khon Kaen material to imitate the Ubon style was sometimes called the Chaiyaphum style.

The Lao regional styles are divided into the southern and central styles (lam) and the northern styles (khap). The northern styles are more distinct as the terrain of northern Laos has made communications there particularly difficult, while in southern and central Laos cross-fertilisation has been much easier. Northern Lao singers typically perform only one style, but those in the south can often perform several regional styles as well as some genres imported from Isan.

The main Lao styles are:

- Lam Sithandone (ລຳສີທັນດອນ, ลำสีทันดร) (also called Lam Si Pan Don [ລຳສີພັນດອນ, ลำสีพันดอน]), from Champassak is similar in style to the lam gon of Ubon. It is accompanied by a solo khene, playing in a san mode, while the vocal line shifts between san and yao scales. The rhythm of the vocal line is also indeterminate, beginning in speech rhythm and shifting to a metrical rhythm.
- Lam Som (Lao: ລຳຊອມ, Thai: ลําซอม) is rarely performed and may now be extinct. From Champassak, the style is hexatonic, using the yao scale plus a supertonic C, making a scale of A-B-C-D-E-G. It uses speech rhythm in the vocal line, with a slow solo khene accompaniment in meter. It is similar to Isan's lam phuen. Both Lam Som and Lam Sithandone lack the descending shape of the vocal line used in the other southern Lao styles.
- Lam Khon Savane (ລຳຄອນສະຫວັນ, ลำคอนสะหวัน, IPA: [lám kʰɔ́ːn.sā.wǎn]) from Savannakhet is one of the most widespread genres. It uses the san scale, with a descending vocal line over a more rigidly metrical ensemble accompaniment. Lam Ban Xoc (ລຳບ້ານຊອກ, ลำบ้านซอก, IPA: [lám bâːn.sɔ̂ːk]) and Lam Mahaxay (ລຳມະຫາໄຊ, มหาไซ, IPA: [lám mā.hǎː sáj]) are musically very similar, but Ban Xoc is usually performed only on ceremonial occasions while Mahaxay is distinguished by a long high note preceding each descent of the vocal line.
- Lam Phu Thai (ລຳຜູ້ໄທ, ลำผู้ไท, IPA: [lám pʰȕː tʰáj]) uses the yao scale, with a descending vocal line and ensemble accompaniment in meter.
- Lam Tang Vay (ລຳຕັງຫວາຍ, ลำตังหวาย, IPA: [lám tàŋ.wǎːj]) is a Lao version of Mon-Khmer music, with a descending ensemble accompaniment.
- Lam Saravane (ລຳສາລະວັນ, ลำสาละวัน [ลำสุวรรณ], IPA: [lám sǎː.lā.wán]) is also of Mon-Khmer origin. It uses the yao scale. The descending vocal line is in speech rhythm, while the khene and drum accompaniment is in meter.
- Khap Thum Luang Phrabang (ຂັບທຸ້ມຫລວງພະບາງ, ขับทุ้มหลวงพระบาง, IPA: [kʰáp tʰȕm lǔa̯ŋ.pʰā(ʔ).bàːŋ]) is related to the court music of Luang Phrabang, but transformed into a folk-song style. The singer and audience alternately sing lines to a set melody, accompanied by an ensemble.
- Khap Xieng Khouang (ຂັບຊຽງຂວາງ, ขับเซียงขวาง, IPA: [kʰáp síaŋ.kʰwǎːŋ]) also called Khap Phuan (ຂັບພວນ, ขับพวน) uses the yao scale and is typically sung metrically by male singers and non-metrically by women.
- Khap Ngeum (ຂັບງຶມ, ขับงึม, IPA: [kʰáp.ŋɯ́m]) uses the yao scale. It alternates declaimed line from the singer and non-metrical khene passages, at a pace slow enough to allow improvisation.
- Khap Xam Neua (ຂັບຊຳເໜຶອ, ขับซำเหนือ, IPA: [kʰáp sám nɯ̌a]) uses the yao scale. Singers are accompanied by a solo khene, declaiming lines each ending in a cadence.
- Khap Tai Dam (ຂັບໄທດຳ, ขับไทดำ, IPA: [kʰáp tʰáj.dām]) used for Tai dam people.

Below is a comparative table of regional mor lam styles, sourced from Compton (1979).

Comparative Features of Styles of Lam
Style	General geographic location	Musical accompaniment
Lam Sithandone ລຳສີທັນດອນ	Muang Khong, Pak Se	khene
Lam Xom ລຳຊອມ	Muang Khong	khene
Lam Saravane ລຳສາລະວັນ	Saravane	khene
Lam Phu Thai ລຳຜູ້ໄທ	Saravane, Savannakhet area	khene, drum, bird calls, sɔ̀ɔ ʔĩi
Lam Tang Vay ລຳຕັງຫວາຍ	Bang Tang Bay, west of Savannakhet	khene, drum, sing, mây pòok pɛɛk
Lam Ban Sok	Ban Sok, outside of Savannakhet	khene, drum, sing
Lam Khon Savan ລຳຄອນສະຫວັນ	Savannakhet area	khene, drum, sing, mây pòok pɛɛk
Lam Mahaxay ລຳມະຫາໄຊ	Mahaxay (west of Thakhek)	khene, drum, sɔ̀ɔ ʔĩi, mây pòok pɛɛk
Khap Xam Neua ຂັບຊຳເໜຶອ	Sam Neua	khene
Khap Ngum	Vientiane plain	khene
Khap Xieng Khouang ຂັບຊຽງຂວາງ	Xieng Khouang	khene
Aan Nang Seu ອ່ານໜັງສື	Luang Prabang	None
Khap Thum ຂັບທຸ້ມ	Luang Prabang	Orchestra
Khap Salaam, Khap Saam Saaw	Luang Prabang	Orchestra
Khap Lohng Kohn Loht Kay	Luang Prabang	Orchestra
Khap Maa Nyohng	Luang Prabang	Orchestra

== Performers ==
Traditionally, young mor lam were taught by established artists, paying them for their teaching with money or in kind. The education focused on memorising the texts of the verses to be sung; these texts could be passed on orally or in writing, but they always came from a written source. Since only men had access to education, it was only men who wrote the texts. The musical education was solely by imitation. Khaen-players typically had no formal training, learning the basics of playing from friends or relatives and thereafter again relying on imitation. With the decline of the traditional genres, this system has fallen into disuse; the emphasis on singing ability (or looks) is greater, while the lyrics of a brief modern song present no particular challenge of memorisation.

The social status of mor lam is ambiguous. Even in the Isan heartland, Miller notes a clear division between the attitudes of rural and urban people: the former see mor lam as "teacher, entertainer, moral force, and preserver of tradition", while the latter, "hold mawlum singers in low esteem, calling them country bumpkins, reactionaries, and relegating them to among the lower classes since they make their money by singing and dancing".

== Performance ==
In Laos, lam may be performed standing (lam yuen) or sitting (lam nang). Northern lam is typically lam yuen and southern lam is typically lam nang. In Isan lam was traditionally performed seated, with a small audience surrounding the singer, but over the latter half of the 20th century the introduction of stages and amplification allowed a shift to standing performances in front of a larger audience.

Live performances are now often large-scale events, involving several singers, a dance troupe and comedians. The dancers (or hang khreuang) in particular often wear spectacular costumes, while the singers may go through several costume changes in the course of a performance. Additionally, smaller-scale, informal performances are common at festivals, temple fairs and ceremonies such as funerals and weddings. These performances often include improvised material between songs and passages of teasing dialogue (Isan สอย, soi) between the singer and members of the audience.

== Characteristics ==
=== Music ===
Lam singing is characterised by the adaptation of the vocal line to fit the tones of the words used. It also features staccato articulation and rapid shifting between the limited number of notes in the scale being used, commonly delivering around four syllables per second. There are two pentatonic scales, each of which roughly corresponds to intervals of a western diatonic major scale as follows:

The actual pitches used vary according to the particular khene accompanying the singer. The khene itself is played in one of six modes based on the scale being used.

Because Thai and Lao do not include phonemic stress, the rhythm used in their poetry is demarcative, i.e., based on the number of syllables rather than on the number of stresses. In gon verse (the most common form of traditional lam text) there are seven basic syllables in each line, divided into three and four syllable hemistiches. When combined with the musical beat, this produces a natural rhythm of four on-beat syllables, three off-beat syllables, and a final one beat rest:

In actual practice this pattern is complicated by the subdivision of beats into even or dotted two-syllable pairs and the addition of prefix syllables which occupy the rest at the end of the previous line; each line may therefore include eleven or twelve actual syllables. In the modern form, there are sudden tempo changes from the slow introduction to the faster main section of the song. Almost every contemporary mor lam song features the following bassline rhythm, which is often ornamented melodically or rhythmically, such as by dividing the crotchets into quavers:

The ching normally play a syncopated rhythm on the off-beat, giving the music a characteristically quick rhythm and tinny sound.

=== Content ===
Mor lam is traditionally sung in Lao. The subject matter varied according to the genre: love in the lam gon of Ubon; general knowledge in the lam jot of Khon Kaen; or Jataka stories in lam phun. The most common verse form was the four-line gon stanza with seven main syllables per line, although in Khon Kaen the technical subject matter led to the use of a free-form series of individual lines, called gon gap. In Laos, it is the regional styles which determine the form of the text. Each style may use a metrical or a speech-rhythm form, or both; where the lines are metrical, the lam styles typically use seven syllables, as in Isan, while the khap styles use four or five syllables per line. The slower pace of some Lao styles allows the singer to improvise the verse, but otherwise the text is memorised.

In recent decades, the Ubon style has come to dominate lam in Isan, while the central Thai influence has led to most songs being written in a mix of Isan and Thai. Unrequited love is a prominent theme, although this is laced with a considerable amount of humour. Many songs feature a loyal boy or girl who stays at home in Isan, while his or her partner goes to work as a migrant labourer in Bangkok and finds a new, richer lover.

The gon verses in lam tang san were typically preceded by a slower, speech-rhythm introduction, which included the words o la no ("oh my dear", an exhortation to the listeners to pay attention) and often a summary of the content of the poem. From this derives the groen (Thai เกริ่น) used in many modern songs: a slow, sung introduction, generally accompanied by the khene, introducing the subject of the song, and often including the o la naw. (sample) The pleng (Thai เพลง) is a sung verse, often in central Thai. (sample), while the actual lam (Thai ลำ) appears as a chorus between pleng sections. (sample)

== Recordings ==
A mor lam VCD featuring Jintara. The karaoke text, dancers, and backdrop are typical of the genre.

As few mor lam artists write all their own material, many of them are extremely prolific, producing several albums each year. Major singers release their recordings on audio tape, CD and VCD formats. The album may take its name from a title track, but others are simply given a series number.

Mor lam VCDs can also often be used for karaoke. A typical VCD song video consists of a performance, a narrative film, or both intercut. The narrative depicts the subject matter of the song; in some cases, the lead role in the film is played by the singer. In the performance, the singer performs the song in front of a static group of dancers, typically female. There may be a number of these recordings in different costumes, and costumes may be modern or traditional dress; the singer often wears the same costume in different videos on the same album. The performance may be outdoors or in a studio; studio performances are often given a psychedelic animated backdrop. Videos from Laos tend to be much more basic, with lower production values.

Some of the most popular current artists are Banyen Rakgan, Chalermphol Malaikham, Somjit Borthong, Pornsak Songsaeng, Jintara Poonlarp, Siriporn Ampaipong and Vieng Narumon. In 2001, the first album by Dutch singer Christy Gibson was released.

In 2000, British musician Jah Wobble released the album Molam Dub (30 Hertz Records), a fusion of his reggae-influenced bass guitar with guest appearances by Laotian singers and performers. In 2007, singer Jonny Olsen released the first ever mor lam album by a Westerner, or "farang" in Laos.)

== Live venues ==
There are several popular venues where mor lam and luk thung music are performed. These venues usually carry the word "Isan" in their names. such as "Tawan Daeng Isan" and "Isan Isan" in Bangkok.

== Mor Lam artists ==
1. Dao Bandon
2. Pornsak Songsaeng
3. Sommainoi Duangcharoen
4. Siriporn Ampaipong
5. Somjit Borthong
6. Noknoi Uraiporn
7. Sathit Thongjan
8. Ki Daophet Niuhuang
9. Jintara Poonlarp
10. Honey Sri-Isan
11. Man Maneewan
12. Monkhaen Kaenkoon
13. Maithai Huajaisilp
14. Dueanphen Amnuaiporn
15. Saeng-arun Bunyu
16. Banyen Rakgan
17. Chalermpol Malakham
18. Poyfai Malaiporn
19. Christy Gibson
20. Tai Orathai
21. Phai Phongsathon
22. Mike Phiromphon
23. Yinglee Srijumpol
24. Ble Patumrach R-Siam
25. Lamyai Haithongkham
26. Moukdavanyh Santiphone
27. Vieng Narumon

== See also ==
- Lao music

== Sources ==
- Alexander, Geoff. Introduction from The Academic Film Archive of North America. Accessed 13 May 2005.
- Broughton, Simon (ed). World Music Volume 2. Rough Guides (2000).
- Chawiwan Damnoen. Mo Lam Singing of Northeast Thailand (CD). World Music Library (1991).
- Compton, Carol. 1979. Courting poetry in Laos: a textual and linguistic analysis. Northern Illinois Center for Southeast Asian Studies.
- Miller, Terry; Williams, Sean (April 1998). Garland Encyclopedia of World Music (Book 4); Southeast Asia (1st ed.). Routledge. ISBN 9780824060404.
- Miller, Terry E. Performing Isan-Style Lam in Laos: an Expression of Pan-Laoism or Thai Hegemony Accessed 13 May 2005.
- Miller, Terry E. (1985). Traditional Music of the Lao: Kaen Playing and Mawlam Singing in North-east Thailand. Greenwood Press. ISBN 0-313-24765-X.
- Mosel, James N. (1959). Sound and Rhythm in Thai and English Verse, Pasa lae Nangsue.
- Prayut Wannaudom The Collision between Local Performing Arts and Global Communication, in case Mawlum. Accessed 13 May 2005.
