= Maithai Huajaisin =

Thai singer

Maithai Huajaisin ไหมไทย หัวใจศิลป์
- Born: Monchai Raksachat; Thai: มนต์ชัย รักษาชาติ; 8 January 1968 (age 58); Nakhon Ratchasima Province, Thailand
- Genres: Luk thung; mor lam; pop; rock
- Occupation: Singer
- Instrument: Vocal
- Years active: 1995–present
- Labels: Topline Diamond, GMM Grammy

Maithai Huajaisin (Thai: ไหมไทย หัวใจศิลป์) (8 January 1968 —), is a Thai singer from Isan area. He is popular in the genre Mor lam sing and as the last member of Sieng Isan band, having released 35 original albums and 122 singles as well as many compilations. He has alias Phra Ek Yai (English: Big Main Male Actor) or Maycheal Jackson (ไหมเคิล แจ็คสัน) or Michael Jackson of Isan.

== 1968 - 1993 : Early life ==
His birth name is Monchai Raksachart. He was born in Nakhon Ratchasima Province and grew up in Kalasin Province.

== 1994 – present : Musical career ==
He started on stage in 1994, as lead vocal from Sieng Isan Mor lam band, with stage name Maithai Uraiporn, with Lookplare Uraiporn, Saeng-arun Bunyu and Ratchada Phalaphon. He recorded a studio album with Lookplare Uraiporn between 1995 and 2008. His song in 2003, See her in Germany (Thai: เห็นเธอที่เยอรมัน) was most popular in Thai social media in 2010s, and was used to make meme by Thai netizen to parody the Thai king Vajiralongkorn, who likes to reign from Bavaria.

In 2008, he registered as an artist with GMM Grammy and renamed his stage name to Maithai Jaitawan. He has 5 original albums from Grammy, but he got out in 2012, and was arrested by Royal Thai Police because he took his songs in Grammy, the record label that he was affiliated with.

In 2013, he registered as an artist with Topline Diamond and renamed his stage name to Maithai Huajaisin, which is his present stage name.

== Personal life ==
He married Maneejan Khammool in 1985. They have a daughter, but they divorced. In 1993, he lived with Waraporn Maneejan, but Waraporn died 2 years later. In 2012, he married Jannapha Insopha, when she was studying in Secondary 4. He is 28 years older than her.

== Discography ==
=== With Lookplare Uraiporn ===
- Mor lam Dao Rung 1 (1994)
- Mor Lam dao Rung Yok Kam Lang 2 (1995)
- Phee Mar Thee Lang (1996)
- Kho Pen Khae Pi Chai (1996)
- Super 2 Dao Rung Chut 1 (1997)
- Super 2 Dao Rung Chut 2 (1997)
- Super 2 Dao Rung Chut 3 (1998)
- Super 2 Dao Rung Chut 4 (1998)
- Chumphae Chumphon Chumphuang (1998)
- Ue Hue Sadue Chap (1999)
- Koi Jai Nong Jin (1999)
- Lak Rak Klap Naeorop (2000)
- Rak Sao Nakhorn Sawan (2000)
- Yak Cho (with Saeng-arun Bunyu and Ratchada Phalaphon) (2001)
- Lang Khaen Duai Nam Ta (2001)
- Adeet Rak Hai Pla Daek (2001)
- Torn Job Pra Aek (2002)
- Kid Hod Sao Fung Lum (2003)
- See her in Germany (2003)

=== Solo ===
==== Topline Diamond ====
- Buk See Der (2004)
- Tem Jai Yom Hai Tua (2014)

==== GMM Grammy ====
- Bao Phan Phuen Mueang (5 June 2007)
- Nak Soo Huajai Seng (5 August 2008)
- Welcome to Thamma (14 July 2009)
- Bor Mee Sith Nuei (26 August 2010)
- Sing Khanong Lam (with Monkaen Kaenkoon) (17 February (2011)
- No.5 Sangkad Phak Phuea Ther (30 November 2011)

=== Partial Discography ===
- Phae Rob Sanam Rak (1995)
- Leek Thang Hai Thei (1997)
- Rak Sao Nahorn Sawan (2000)
- See her in Germany (2003)
- Nong Ma Kab Khamwa Chai (2008)
- Phua Sam Rong (2015)
- Gub Kum Sah Lah (Cover Version) (Original: Mike Phiromphon) (2020)

=== Collaborations ===
- 2009 – New Nang Kang Sai (with Ratchanok Srilophan) (Original : Mike Phiromphon)
