= Banyen Rakgan =

Thai mor lam and Thai luk thung singer (born 1952)

Banyen Rakgan บานเย็น รากแก่น
- Born: October 14, 1952 (age 73); Ubon Ratchathani, Isan, Thailand
- Occupation: Singer

Banyen Rakkaen (Thai: บานเย็น รากแก่น; RTGS: Banyen Rakkaen) (born on October 14, 1952, to an Isan family in Ubon Ratchathani province in the Isan region of Northeast Thailand) is a Thai mor lam and Thai luk thung singer. Banyen Rakkaen is known as the "Queen of mor lam" and after 45 years in the business she was named a National Artist in 2014 for her contribution to folk music.

== Biography ==
She is also a student of National Artist, Master Chaweewan Dumnern.

Banyen was the first national mor lam star, whose appearances on television in the 1980s brought the form to an audience beyond its northeastern heartland. She bridges the gap between traditional and modern mor lam, normally appearing in traditional clothing but using electrified instruments and singing luk thung and dance-influenced songs.
