= KPN Award =

The KPN Award vocal competition was founded in 1983, and is considered to be one of Thailand's most prestigious singing contests. Former contestants include Thongchai "Bird" McIntyre and Jennifer Kim. Thassapak hsu was a winner in the year 2011

== Winners ==
- Phrimaphaa Khornrojjanachawin -Nok (2009)
- Ekkapan Wannasut (2010)
- Chayapol Panhakarn (2012)
- Thassapak hsu (2011)
