= Moukdavanh Santiphone =

Laotian country singer (born 1997)

Moukdavanh Santiphone ມຸກດາວັນ ສັນຕິພອນ
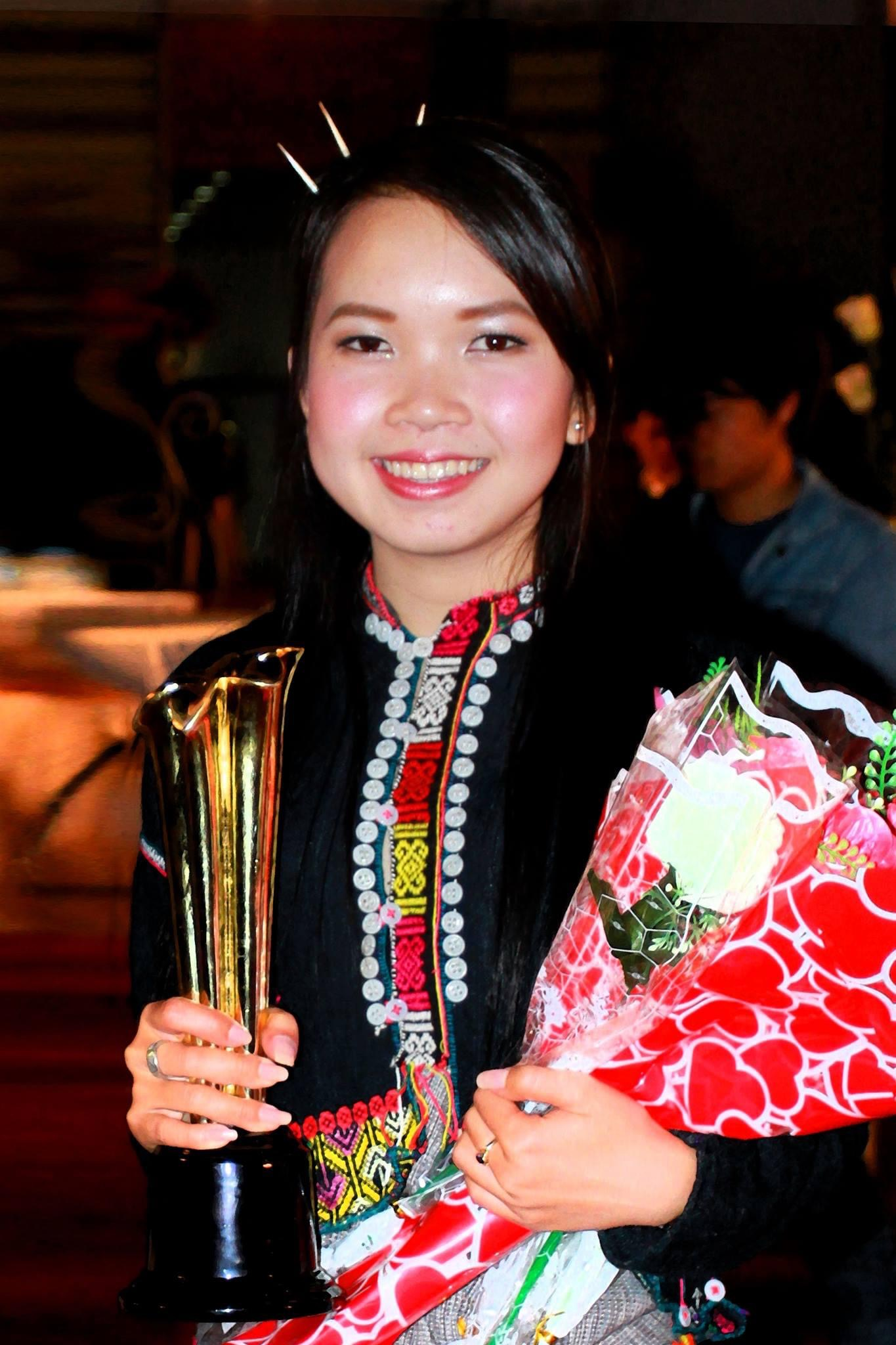

Background information
- Born: 1997 (age 28–29)
- Genres: Country music
- Occupation: Singer
- Instrument: Voice

Moukdavanh Santiphone (Lao: ມຸກດາວັນ ສັນຕິພອນ; born 1997) is a Laotian country singer. Originally from Inghang village in Savannakhet province, Santiphone comes from a musical family and has been performing since she was a young child of five. She is a descendant of the singer Phra That Ing Hang. She often wears traditional clothing to perform in. As of 2015 she was the most viewed Laotian musician on YouTube. In 2016 she featured in the same concert as Thai rock musician Sek Loso, but critics argued that her country music was the wrong choice to join the bill. In 2024 she released new music following a career hiatus.

== Awards ==
- Best Female Country Singer - Lao Music Awards (2014)

== Discography ==
- Sam La Plae Jai (ຊຳລະແຜໃຈ) [in English: Purify the Heart]
- Bao Tha Kaek Sao Sa Wan (ບ່າວທ່າແຂກ-ສາວສະຫວັນ) [in English: Boy Thakhaek - Girl Savanna]
- Mon Hak Bao Mueang Wang (ມົນຮັກບ່າວເມືອງວັງ) [in English: I love the boy from Muang Vang]
