= Northern Khmer people =

Northern Khmer people; เขมรเหนือ
Total population
- ≈ 1.4 million (as of 2015)

Regions with significant populations
- Isan (Buriram, Sisaket, Surin); Eastern (Chanthaburi, Trat)

Languages
- Isan, Northern Khmer, Thai

Religion
- Theravada Buddhism

Related ethnic groups
- Khmer, Khmer Krom

Northern Khmer people (Thai: เขมรเหนือ) or colloquially as Thais of Khmer origin (Thai: ชาวไทยเชื้อสายเขมร), mostly referred to as Khmer Surin (Khmer: ខ្មែរសុរិន្ទ; Thai: เขมรสุรินทร์) is the designation used to refer to ethnic Khmers native to the Northeast Thailand.

== Etymology ==
Northern Khmer people, also known as "Khamae Lue" (Thai: ขแมร์ลือ/คแมร์ลือ), are an ethnic Khmer group native to Thailand. The term "Khamae" (Thai: ขแมร์/คแมร์) denotes the "Khmer people", while "Lue" (Thai: ลือ) means "upper" or "northern". Therefore, "Khmer Lue" (Thai: ขแมร์ลือ/คแมร์ลือ) literally translates to Northern Khmer (Thai: เขมรสูง/เขมรเหนือ).

The term "Khamae Lue" is derived from the Khmer, and represents a Khmer expression written in the Thai script, similar to Khmer Loeu (Khmer: ខ្មែរលើ).

== History ==
Khmers have had a presence in the Northeast Thailand since at least the time of the Khmer Empire.

== Demographics ==
Khmer percentage of the total population in various provinces of Thailand
Province	Khmer % in 1990	Khmer % in 2000
Surin	63.4%	47.2%
Buriram	0.3%	27.6%
Sisaket	30.2%	26.2%
Trat	0.4%	2.1%
Sa Kaeo	N/A	1.9%
Chanthaburi	0.6%	1.6%
Roi Et	0.4%	0.5%
Ubon Ratchathani	0.8%	0.3%
Maha Sarakham	0.2%	0.3%

== Culture ==
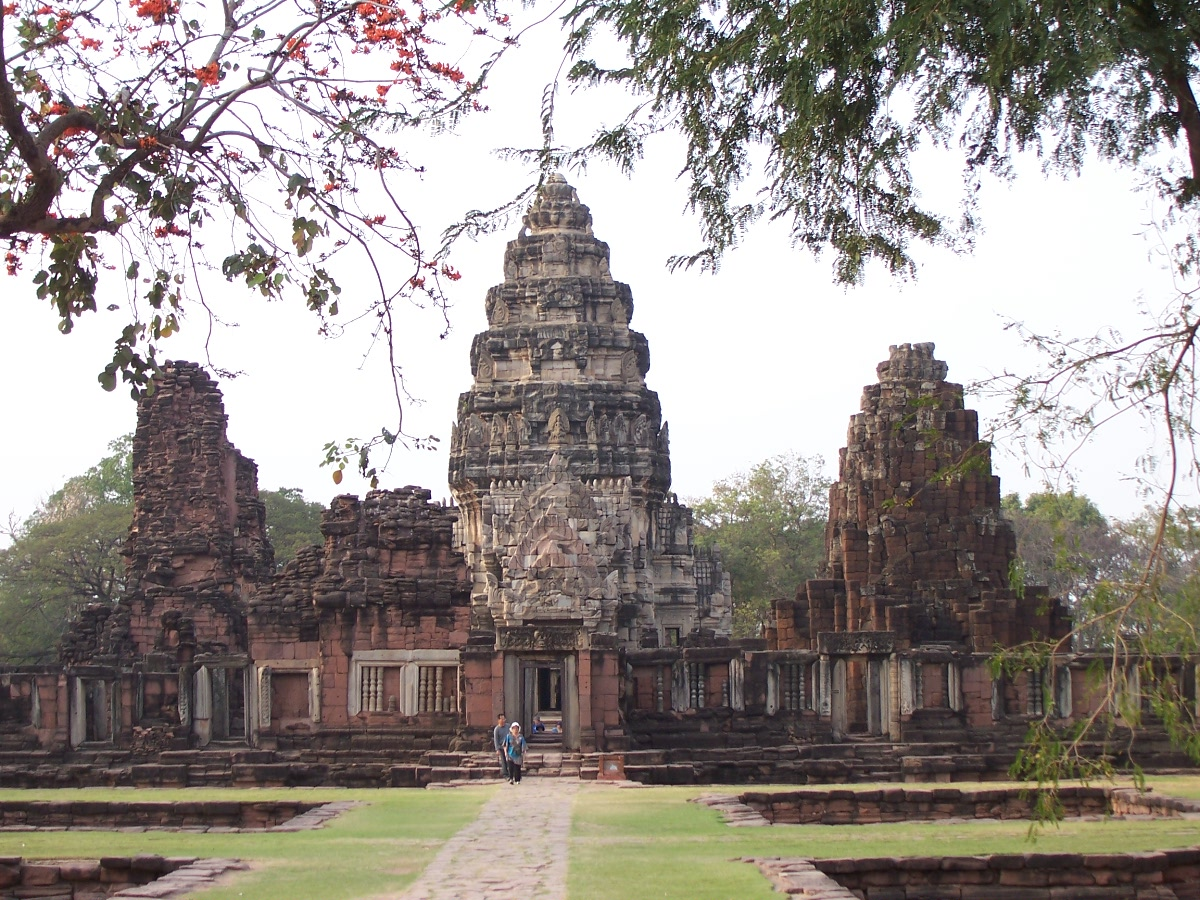
Prasat Phimai, the 12th century Khmer temple in Nakhon Ratchasima, Thailand

the Northern Khmer have maintained some of their Khmer identity, practicing the Khmer form of Theravada Buddhism and speaking a dialect known as Khmê in Khmer and Northern Khmer in English. Few Northern Khmers are able to read or write their native language, since teaching in public schools is exclusively in Thai.

The Thai language instruction has resulted in many of the younger generation being more comfortable using Thai as a medium of communication. In 1998, Smalley reported renewed interest in Khmer language and culture had resulted in a two-fold increase in the use of Northern Khmer since 1958. However, usage of Khmer has subsequently declined.

In the past two decades, there has been state-directed revitalization of 'local' cultures in Thailand, including of Khmer culture, which has been challenged for adopting a state narrative and insufficiently empowering the Northern Khmer themselves.

Kantrum (Thai: กันตรึม, Khmer: កន្រ្ទឹម) is a popular musical genre in the Southern part of Isan that originated within the Khmer community. The musical accompaniment is similar to that of Cambodian-Khmer music, includinc both drums and fiddles. The lyrics are sung in Khmer.

An annual festival is celebrated each year in front of Prasat Phanom Rung temple to celebrate the 1000-year-old Khmer heritage of the region. During the festivities, Apsara dancers are parading in front of the temple.

== Conflict ==
Some Northern Khmers living in the Isan region have demanded more rights and oppose Thaification of the Surin Khmer. Also, the occasional hostilities between Thailand and Cambodia have made their relations sometimes difficult.

== Genetics ==
A 2016 study revealed genetic distinctiveness between samples taken from two geographically close Northern Khmer population clusters as well as with an ethnolinguistically related group, the Cambodian Khmer.

== See also ==
- Kuy people
