= Pong lang =

Wooden xylophone from the Isan region of Thailand

Pong lang โปงลาง
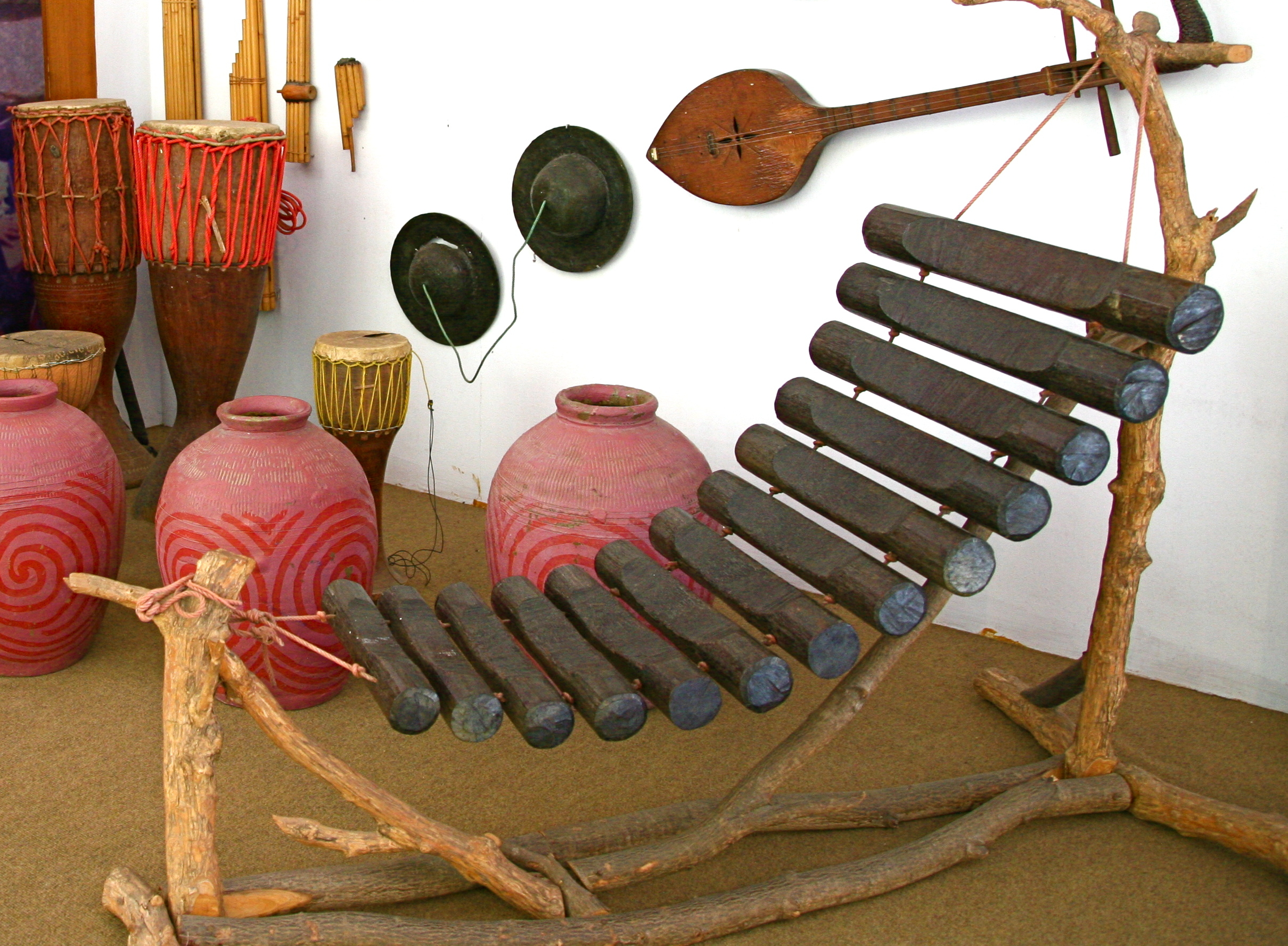
- Pong lang xylophone, front. The instrument is made of shaped logs, tuned by removing wood from the center.

Percussion instrument
- Classification: Percussion (idiophone)
- Hornbostel–Sachs classification: 111.212 (Sets of percussion sticks in a range of different pitches combined into one instrument, struck with a non-sonorous object)

The pong lang (Thai: โปงลาง, RTGS: ponglang, Thai pronunciation: [pōːŋ.lāːŋ]) is a xylophone from the Isan region of northeast Thailand. The instrument may be played as a standalone instrument, in pairs with one player playing melody and the other harmonizing, or as part of an orchestra. Players use carved two hardwood mallets.

The instrument is not standardized and the number of tone bars and their size can vary. Unlike the ranat ek lek and ranat thum lek which are strung over a box, the pong lang is hung from a post or tree with the string of tone bars arcing down toward the ground. wide to short. The number of tone bars varies, and 12 or 15 tone bars may make up a set. The wider bars with lower pitch sit at the top of the string and the other end (with smaller high-pitched bars) may be hooked to the player's toe or to a belt around the player's waist.

When there are two performers, they may sit on opposite sides of the post, facing one another. With two instruments, one plays the melody, the other plays a drone accompaniment or harmonics. The pong lang is mostly used for many occasions, especially for festivals and ceremonies. The instrument can be played solo or in an ensemble.

Pong lang in use

== See also ==
- Ranat
- Ranat thum
- Ranat ek lek
- Ranat thum lek
- Traditional Thai musical instruments
- Luntang
- Amadinda
- Akadinda
