= The Overture =

2004 film

- The film poster in Thai language
- Directed by: Itthisoontorn Vichailak
- Screenplay by: Itthisoontorn Vichailak; Peerasak Saksiri; Dolkamol Sattatip
- Story by: Itthisoontorn Vichailak
- Produced by: Itthisoontorn Vichailak; Chatrichalerm Yukol; Nonzee Nimibutr; Duangkamol Limcharoen; Pisamai Laodara
- Starring: Anuchit Sapanpong; Aratee Tanmahapran; Adul Dulyarat; Narongrit Tosa-nga; Somlek Sakdikul
- Cinematography: Nattawut Kittikhun
- Edited by: Itthisoontorn Vichailak
- Music by: Chatchai Pongprapaphan
- Distributed by: Sahamongkol Film International
- Release date: February 6, 2004 (Thailand)
- Running time: 104 minutes
- Country: Thailand
- Language: Thai

The Overture (Thai: โหมโรง, Hom rong) is a 2004 Thai tragic-nostalgia music-drama film. The film is a fictionalised account based on the life story of Thai palace musician Luang Pradit Phairoh (Sorn Silapabanleng), which follows the life of a Thai classical musician from the late 19th century to the 1940s. The film was the winner of several awards in Thailand and was the country's official selection for the 77th Academy Award for Best Foreign Language Film. It was directed by Itthisoontorn Vichailak, who also co-wrote the script. Producers included Nonzee Nimibutr and Chatrichalerm Yukol. The film was credited with a revival in the popularity of piphat – Thai classical music. In 2015, this film was remade into a musical play, which ran from the 4th of April to 17 May at KBank Siam Pic-Ganesha Theatre.

== Plot ==
The story begins in the 1940s, with the Sorn recounting the tale of his childhood in 1880s Siam, during the reign of King Chulalongkorn.

Sorn's father bars the boy from taking up the ranat ek (Thai xylophone) due to his brother's murder, precipitated by musical rivalry. Sorn defies his father and continues to play the instrument secretly.

Sorn becomes highly skilled at playing the ranat ek, leading to his father's support. As he excels, he grows arrogant, leading to his father forcing him to play the lesser Khong-wong (Thai tambourine) to humble him. At a competition, Sorn steps in to lead his band, playing the ranat ek, and wins.

He is recruited by the palace, where he taught by the strict Master Tian. Sorn is taught all Thai instruments, and is punished for showing off - leading to his place being temporarily relinquished to a lesser player. At the kingdom's musical competition, it is Sorn who is again the lead player, where he must overcome his fear and face an old rival named Khun In.

In the 1940s, Sorn is a respected teacher. This is during the rule of the dictator, Field Marshal Plaek Pibulsonggram, whose government called for the accelerated modernisation of Thailand amidst the ongoing Japanese occupation of Thailand, leading to the suppression of traditional Thai music, dance and theatre. Despite this, when his son brings a piano home, Sorn blends Thai and Western music by playing the ranat ek alongside the piano, showing the importance of embracing the evolution of traditions.

== Cast ==
- Anuchyd Sapanphong as younger Sorn
- Adul Dulyarat as elderly Sorn
- Pongpat Wachirabunjong as Lt Col Veera
- Narongrit Tosa-nga as Khun In
- Phoovarit Phumpuang as Terd
- Somlek Sakdikul as Master Tian

== Cast for Musical ==
- Kornkan Sutthikoses as younger Sorn
- Sathida Prompiriya as younger Chote

== Reception ==
After a poor showing at the box office on opening weekend, The Overture was pulled from many theaters. However, due to interest on Internet forums such as Pantip.com, the film was brought back and become a sensation that won numerous awards and sparked renewed interest in Thai classical music. The film was embraced by Royal Family and the Thai government, which used it as a promotional tool. It was one of the most popular Thai films of 2004.

== Awards ==
In addition to being named as Thailand's official selection for Best Foreign Language Film for the 77th Academy Awards, The Overture collected dozens of awards in Thailand. They include:

2004 Thailand National Film Association Awards

- Best Picture
- Best Director
- Best Supporting Actor (Adul Dulyarat)
- Best Cinematography (Nattawut Kittikhun)
- Best Editing (Itthisoontorn Vichailak)
- Best Screenplay (Itthisoontorn Vichailak, Peerasak Saksiri, Dolkamol Sattatip)
- Best Sound

2004 Bangkok Critics Assembly Awards

- Best Picture
- Best Director
- Best Supporting Actor (Pongpat Wachirabanjong)
- Best Film Editing
- Best Music

2004 Star Entertainment Award

- Best Picture
- Best Director
- Best Supporting Actor (Adul Dulyarat)
- Best Film Editing
- Best Screenplay
- Best Sound Recording
- Best Music

== Film festivals ==
The Overture was screened at many film festivals in 2004 and 2005. They include:

- Toronto International Film Festival
- Vancouver International Film Festival
- Pusan International Film Festival
- London Film Festival
- Miami International Film Festival
- Seattle International Film Festival

== Soundtrack ==
Original Motion Picture Soundtrack: The Overture

Soundtrack album by various artists
- Released: 2004
- Recorded: 2003; Apollo Lab; Sri Siam Studio; Bangkok
- Genre: Thai classical
- Length: 32:20
- Labels: Gimmick Films; Cinemasia; Promittr Production; Sahamongkol Film International
- Producer: Itthisoontorn Vichailak

The original score was composed by Chatchai Pongprapaphan, with Thai classical music performed by Chaibhuk Bhutrachinda, the Korphai Ensemble and Narongrit Tosa-nga.

Narongrit, who portrayed Khun-In in the film, is a professional musician and a gifted player of the ranad-ek (Thai xylophone) and actually performed his own ranad-ek parts in the film.

The Overture won Best Music at the Star Entertainment Awards 2004 and Bangkok Critics Assembly Awards.

A soundtrack album was produced by Itthisoontorn Vichailak and released in 2004, but has since gone out of print.

=== Track listing ===
1. "Assajun" ("อัศจรรย์", or "Miracle", composed by Petch Marr and Pijika) – 4:40
2. "Kaek bor-ra-tes" ("แขกบรเทศ") – 0:53
3. "Ton worrachet" ("ต้นวรเชษฐ์") – 1:35
4. "Kum warn" ("คำหวาน") – 1:34
5. "Kra-tai ten" ("กระต่ายเต้น") – 1:18
6. "Lao duang duen" ("ลาวดวงเดือน") – 1:10
7. "Hom rong pra-derm chai" ("โหมโรงประเดิมชัย") – 1:39
8. "Hom rong um-ma-baht" ("โหมโรงอัฐมบาท") – 1:37
9. "Hom rong chor paka" ("โหมโรงช่อผกา") – 1:22
10. "Home rong jeen tok mai" ("โหมโรงจีนตอกไม้") – 1:55
11. "Saen kum-nueng" ("แสนคำนึง") – 3:11
  - Tracks 2-11 traditional Thai music performed by Chaibhuk Bhutrachinda, Korphai and Narongrit Tosa-nga
12. "Raek phob" ("แรกพบ") – 2:12
13. "Terd toh" ("เติบโต") – 2:38
14. "Berk barn" ("เบิกบาน") – 0:50
15. "Sum nuek" ("สำนึก") – 1:10
16. "Chai-cha-na" ("ชัยชนะ") – 2:10
17. "Kwam wung" ("ความหวัง") – 2:23
  - Tracks 12–17 are adapted from the original score by Chatchai Pongrapaphan

== See also ==
- Music of Thailand
- Traditional Thai musical instruments
- Ranat ek musical instrument
