= Ranat ek =

Musical instrument

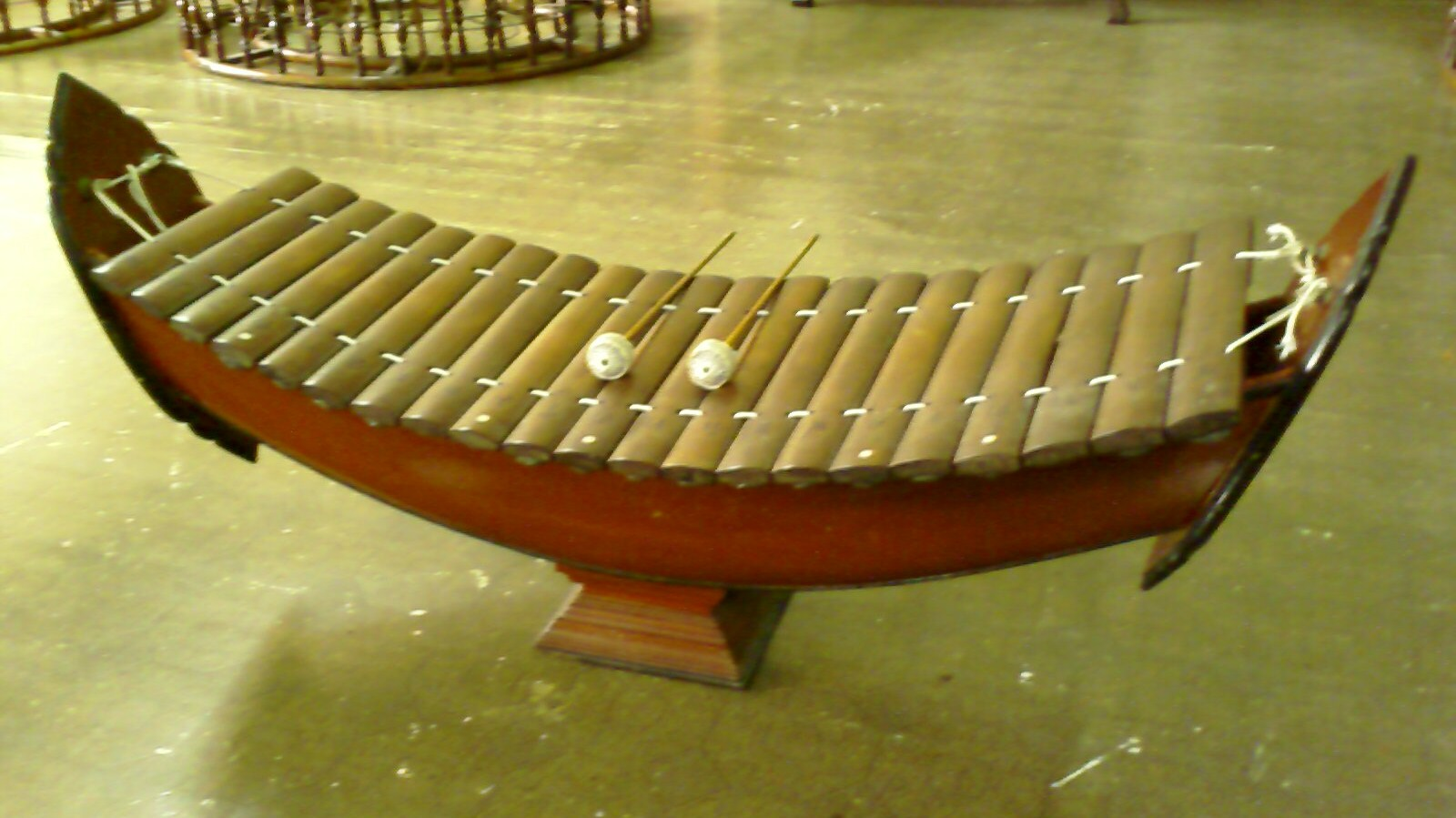
- Classification: Percussion (idiophone)

Related instruments
- Roneat ek, ranat ek lek, ranat thum, pattala

Sound sample: seven-note scale played on the Ranat ek

The ranat ek (Thai: ระนาดเอก, pronounced [ranâːt ʔèːk], "also xylophone") is a Thai musical instrument in the percussion family that consists of 22 wooden bars suspended by cords over a boat-shaped trough resonator and struck by two mallets. It is used as a leading instrument in the piphat ensemble.

Ranat ek bars are typically made from rosewood (Dalbergia oliveri; Thai: ไม้ชิงชัน, romanized: mai ching chan) and have two types of mallets. The hard mallets create the sharp and bright sound, normally used for faster playing. The soft mallets create the mellow and softer tone, used for slower songs.

In the Thai xylophone family, there are several similar instrument with bars made from different types of material, such as metal (ranat ek lek, ranat thum lek) and glass (ranat kaeo). There is another similar Thai xylophone that has a different kind of wooden bar, called the ranat thum. Its appearance is similar to the ranat ek, but it is lower and wider. It is usually played in accompaniment with a ranat ek. Also, the ranat ek is very similar to the Cambodian xylophone called the roneat ek, and the Burmese bamboo xylophone called the pattala.

== History ==
The earliest known description of a ranat was in Thailand in 1826. The Ranat ek was originally an instrument called the Krap. A pair of krap were used to keep the rhythm in ensembles. Later, krap were put into a series. However, the tones when the bars were struck were out of tune. It was then decided to make a series of krap on two tracks to support it. After the instrument makers gained some experience and knowledge, the krap were made in a series of sizes with a track to hold them together, making the tone clearer. To make them into a series, a heavy string was threaded through holes made near the ends of the krap. The krap were placed near each other on this cord and the entire "keyboard" was hung on a supporting stand. Later on, the keyboard was improved using krap and beeswax with lead shavings attached underneath each krap to improve the tone. This whole instrument was called a ranat and the krap which make up the keyboard were called a luk ranat. The whole series of krap or the keyboard is called a pern. At first, the keys of ranat were made of two kinds of bamboo, Dendrocalamus Nees (Dendrocalamus Nees; Thai: ไผ่ตง, romanized: phai tong) and Indian Timber Bamboo (Bambusa tulda; Thai: ไผ่บง, romanized: phai bong). Later on, different types of hardwood were used, such as rosewood (Dalbergia oliveri; Thai: ไม้ชิงชัน, romanized: mai ching chan), Lakoochaand (Artocarpus lacucha; Thai: ไม้มะหาด, romanized: mai mahat) or Siamese Rosewood (Dalbergia cochinchinensis; Thai: ไม้พะยูง, romanized: mai pa yung). Normally, Indian Timber Bamboo is preferred because of its tone. The support of the keyboard is shaped like a Thai riverboat, curving at each end.

The first Thai instrument ensembles only used one ranat, and this had fewer keys than the ranat nowadays. More and more keys were added until the ranat became too large for one stand to hold. So a second ranat with lower toned keys was created. This was called ranat thum, with the original ranat with the higher-toned keys being called ranat ek.

== Structure ==
The modern ranat ek model has 22 keys. The lowest-toned key is 38 cm long, 5 cm wide and 1.5 cm thick. The keys decrease in size and become thicker as the tones go higher. The highest-toned key is 30 cm long.

== Tuning ==
Each octave is divided into seven equal parts, which results in complex musical ratios but easy transposition between keys. This is analogous to the benefits and drawbacks of Western 12-pitch equal temperament.

== See also ==
- Ranat
- Ranat thum
- Ranat ek lek
- Ranat thum lek
- Traditional Thai musical instruments
- 2004 Thai Movie, "The Overture" about ranat-ek player Luang Pradit Phairoh
