= Luang Pradit Pairoh =

Thai musician

- ศร ศิลปบรรเลง
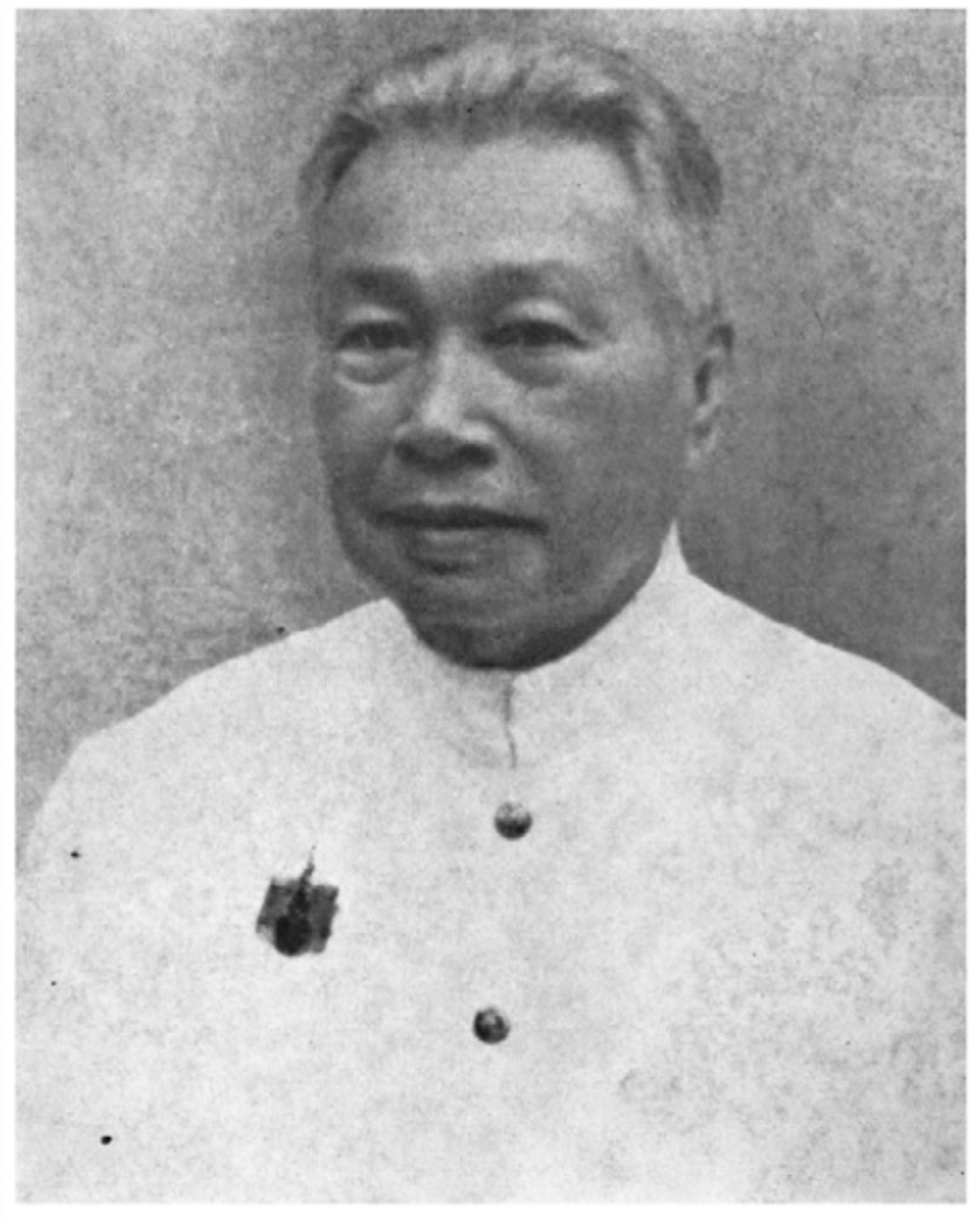
- Born: Sorn; 6 August 1881
- Died: 8 March 1954 (aged 72)
- Spouse: Choti Silpabanleng Fu Silpabanleng

Sorn Silpabanleng (Thai: ศร ศิลปบรรเลง, RTGS: Son Sinlapabanleng, 6 August 1881 – 8 March 1954), commonly known by his title as Luang Pradit Pairoh (หลวงประดิษฐไพเราะ, also spelled Pradit Phairoh, RTGS: Praditphairo) was a Thai musician who was famous for playing Thai instruments and composing original Thai songs.

== Biography ==
Luang Pradit Pairoh had the original name "Sorn". He was born on 6 August 1881 at Dowadeung Sub-district, Amphawa District, Samut Songkhram Province, in the reign of King Rama V. He was the son of Mr.Sin and Mrs.Yim Sinbanleng. His father was owner of a gamelan band and was Pra Pradit Pairoh's disciple (Mee Duriyangkul).

== Musical ability ==
Sorn could play Khong wong yai when he was five years old. When he was eleven years old, he began to study about Thai piphat ensembles (gamelan). He played the ranat (Thai xylophone) swiftly since childhood. His father taught him until he was able to perform one of the best performances in the Mekong basin. This made him more popular among musicians in his region.

In 1900, when he was 19 years old, he was playing the ranat for Prince Bhanurangsi Savangwongse, a younger brother of King Chulalongkorn. Prince Bhanurangsi Savangwongse brought Sorn into the Buraphaphirom Palace to be the main ranat (ranat ek) player. On June 27, 1925, Silpabanleng was given the title of Luang Pradit Pairoh in the department of dramatic arts by insurrection 400. The ceremony was held on July 11 at Borompiman Hall, and was given the rank of bridegroom on July 13 of the same year. On the other hand, he had never been in the department before, but because of his skill and ability, he was engaging.

In 1926, Luang Pradit Pairoh has served in the department of gamelan and ministry of royal pantomime. He contributed his teaching of music to King Rama VII and his wife. There are three songs which he help the King's royals write, such as Ratreepradupdoaw, Khmerrahong, Homrongkluenkratopfung.

He died on March 8, 1954 at the age of 73.

== Family ==
Luang Pradit Pairoh married firstly with Choti Silpabanleng (née Huraphan) and had 7 children together. Later, when Choti died he then married secondly with Choti's sister, Fu Silpabanleng (née Huraphan) and had are 5 children together, a total of 12 children include

Issues with Choti:

1. Soikhaimukda Silpabanleng (died in childhood)
2. Sukradara Silpabanleng (died in childhood)
3. Khunying Chin Chaiyapak married Prasong Chaiyapak and had 1 daughter
  1. Mathuros Visutthakul
4. Nang Mahathep Kasatrsamuha (Banleng Sakrik) married Phra Mahathep Kasatrsamuha (Nueang Sakrik) and had 4 children
  1. Malini Sakrik
  2. Nikhom Sakrik
  3. Phiangphen Sakrik
  4. Chanok Sakrik
5. Silpasravudh Silpabanleng (died in childhood)
6. Prasit Silpabanleng
7. Pallika Silpabanleng

Issues with Fu:

1. Chatchavan Chanrueang
2. Daeng Silpabanleng (died in childhood)
3. Khwanchai Silpabanleng
4. Captain Somchai Silpabanleng
5. Sanan Silpabanleng

== Workmanship ==
=== Overture ===
Krataetaimai, Prathomdusit, Sornthong, PrachumTewarach, Bangkhun, Mahsabudkeep etc.

=== Set Song ===
Krataichomduen, Khomthong, Khmer, Khmerpaktor, Taohe, Jeenlunthun, etc.

== Royal decorations ==
- Order of the Crown of Thailand - 5th Class
- Dushdi Mala Medal, Pin of Art and Sciences (May 5, 1929)
- King Rama V Rajaruchi Medal (Gold Medal)
- King Rama VI Rajaruchi Medal (Gold Medal)

== Legacy ==
The Overture, a fictionalised account of his life was filmed in 2004. It received many awards in Thailand and was submitted to the Academy Award for Best Foreign Film. It has also been adapted into a television series on Thai PBS in 2012.

In 2017, he was featured as a Google Doodle on what would have been his 136th birthday.
