= Korphai =

- Also known as: kor phai, Thai: กอไผ่
- Origin: Thailand
- Genres: Piphat
- Years active: 1980s–present
- Members: Anant Narkkong; Prasarn Wongwirojrak; Chaibhuk Bhutrachinda; Asdavuth Sagarik; Banhan Palo; Lerkiat Mahavinijchaimontri; Thawisak Akarawong; Tossaporn Tassana; Kanokporn Tassana; Amon Bhuthanu; Akkrapon Apicho

Korphai Ensemble, Korphai or kor phai (Thai: กอไผ่, pronounced [kɔː pʰàj], RTGS: ko phai) which literally means a 'bunch of bamboo', is an ensemble of traditional Thai percussion music.

It was established in the 1980s by Anant Narkkong, the present musical director of the ensemble, who is a professor of ethnomusicology and composition at the Faculty of Music at Silpakorn University. He also airs a radio program of Thai music at the National Broadcasting Services of Thailand.

== Music ==
The group plays Thai classical, or piphat, as well as Thai contemporary music. Throughout the past 20 years, Korphai has released a number of albums and performed in numerous public concerts in Thailand, including a performance with the Bangkok Symphony Orchestra. The group has also performed abroad, including Los Angeles, San Francisco, Chicago, Paris, Amsterdam and Berlin.

The groups is also involved in the music used in Thai films, documentaries, theatres, plays, and festival presentations, such as "Thai Percussion Days 2004" in Vienna. Their music was used in the Thai films, The Legend of Suriyothai (2001) and The Overture (2004). The Overture won Best Music with Kor Phai named as co-recipient in Star Entertainment Awards 2004 and Bangkok Critics Assembly Awards.

In 2005, at the concert dedicated to the 55th anniversary of Thai-Cambodian diplomatic relations at the Chaktomuk Theatre, the performance of the ensemble "won accolades from members of Cambodian royal family", Bangkok Post reported.

== Discography ==
- 2007 – Korphai : Bamboo Songs Bamboo Sounds
- 2004 – Original Motion Picture Soundtrack: The Overture
- 2003 – Homrak Hom Rong (The Delightful Overture) (Label: Nong Taprachan)
- Ratree Pradap Dao

== Awards ==
| Year | Award |
|---|---|
| 1983 | National Music Contest, the national theatre |
| 2004 | "The Overture" Best Film Music and Score, Hamburger Award |
| 2005 | "The Overture" Best Film Music and Score, Thailand Critics Association |
| 2005 | "The Overture" Best Film Music, Thailand Media Association |

== Korphai Music Genres ==
1. Traditional Thai Music: Piphat, Mahoree, Kruangsai Ancient repertoire and selected compositions from famous Thai composers.

2. Folk-Pop music Variety of songs; ranging from Thai folks to international popular music.

3. Fusion Jazz music Variety of Thai songs rearranged in fusion style.

4. Asian-mix Musics of Southeast Asian; rearranged in flexible performance style including stage movements.

5. Experimental music Improvisations & Compositions from modern Thai composers plus multi-media presentations.

6. Theatre Music / Film Music

== Korphai musicians ==
| Name | Role | Instruments |
|---|---|---|
| Anant Narkkong | Music Director | Percussion |
| Prasarn Wongwirojrak | Member | Vibraphone, Percussion |
| Chaibhuk Bhutrachinda | Composer | Gong, Electric Guitar |
| Asdavuth Sagarik | Member | Ranat, Gong, Khim |
| Banhan Palo | Percussion, Instruments Tuner | |
| Lerkiat Mahavinijchaimontri | Coordinator | Fiddle, coordinator |
| Thawisak Akarawong | Member | Leading Xylophone |
| Tossaporn Tassana | Technician | Drums |
| Kanokporn Tassana | Singer | |
| Amon Bhuthanu | Member | Keyboard, Gong, Xylophone |
| Akkrapon Apicho | Member | Bass |
