= Ranat =

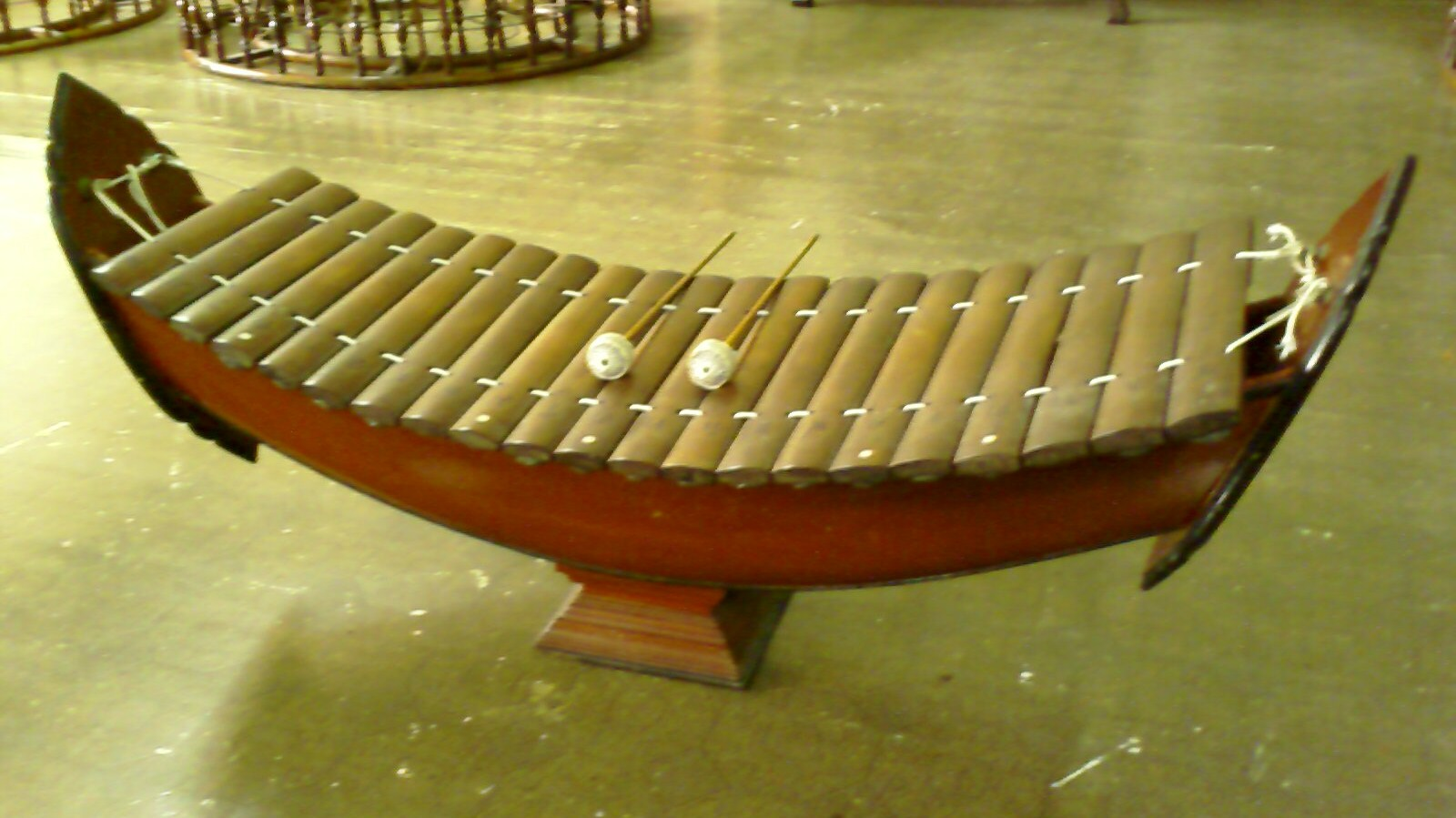
A Ranat ek

Ranat (Thai: ระนาด, Lao: ລະນາດ pronounced [ranâːt], also spelled ranad or ranaat) is the generic name for keyboard percussion instruments used in the music of Thailand and Laos. The bars of the various types of ranat may be made from hardwood or bamboo (ranat ek ระนาดเอก and ranat thum ระนาดทุ้ม), metal (ranat ek lek ระนาดเอกเหล็ก and ranat thum lek ระนาดทุ้มเหล็ก), or, much more rarely, glass (ranat kaeo ระนาดแก้ว).

== See also ==
- Ranat ek
- Ranat thum
- Ranat ek lek
- Ranat thum lek
- Ranat kaeo
- Bong lang
- Glockenspiel
- Traditional Thai musical instruments
