= Piphat =

Ensemble in Thai classical music

Video: Piphat played at Wat Khung Taphao, Uttaradit Province

Video 2

Sound sample

A piphat (Thai: วงปี่พาทย์) is a kind of ensemble in the classical music of Thailand, which features wind and percussion instruments. It is considered the primary form of ensemble for the interpretation of the most sacred and "high-class" compositions of the Thai classical repertoire, including the Buddhist invocation entitled sathukan (Thai: สาธุการ) as well as the suites called phleng rueang. It is also used to accompany traditional Thai theatrical and dance forms including khon (Thai: โขน) (masked dance-drama), lakhon (classical dance), and shadow puppet theater.

Piphat in the earlier time was called phinphat. It is analogous to the Cambodian musical ensemble of pinpeat and Laotian ensemble of pinphat.

== Types of piphat ==
The smallest piphat, called piphat khrueang ha, is composed of six instruments: pi nai (oboe); ranat ek (xylophone); khong wong yai (gong circle); taphon or other Thai drums; glong thad, a set of two large barrel drums beaten with sticks; and ching (small cymbals). Often other small percussion instruments such as krap or chap are used.

A slightly larger piphat ensemble is called piphat khrueang khu, and consists of eight musical instruments. The other two instruments are the ranat thum (xylophone), which produces a deeper sound than the ranat ek, and khong wong lek, a gong circle that is higher in pitch than the khong wong yai.

The largest form of piphat ensemble is the piphat khrueang yai, which consists of ten musical instruments. Another ones are ranat ek lek and ranat thum lek; these are almost the same as their ancestors, the ranat ek and ranat thum, but they have keys made from metal instead of wood.

=== Piphat khrueang ha ===
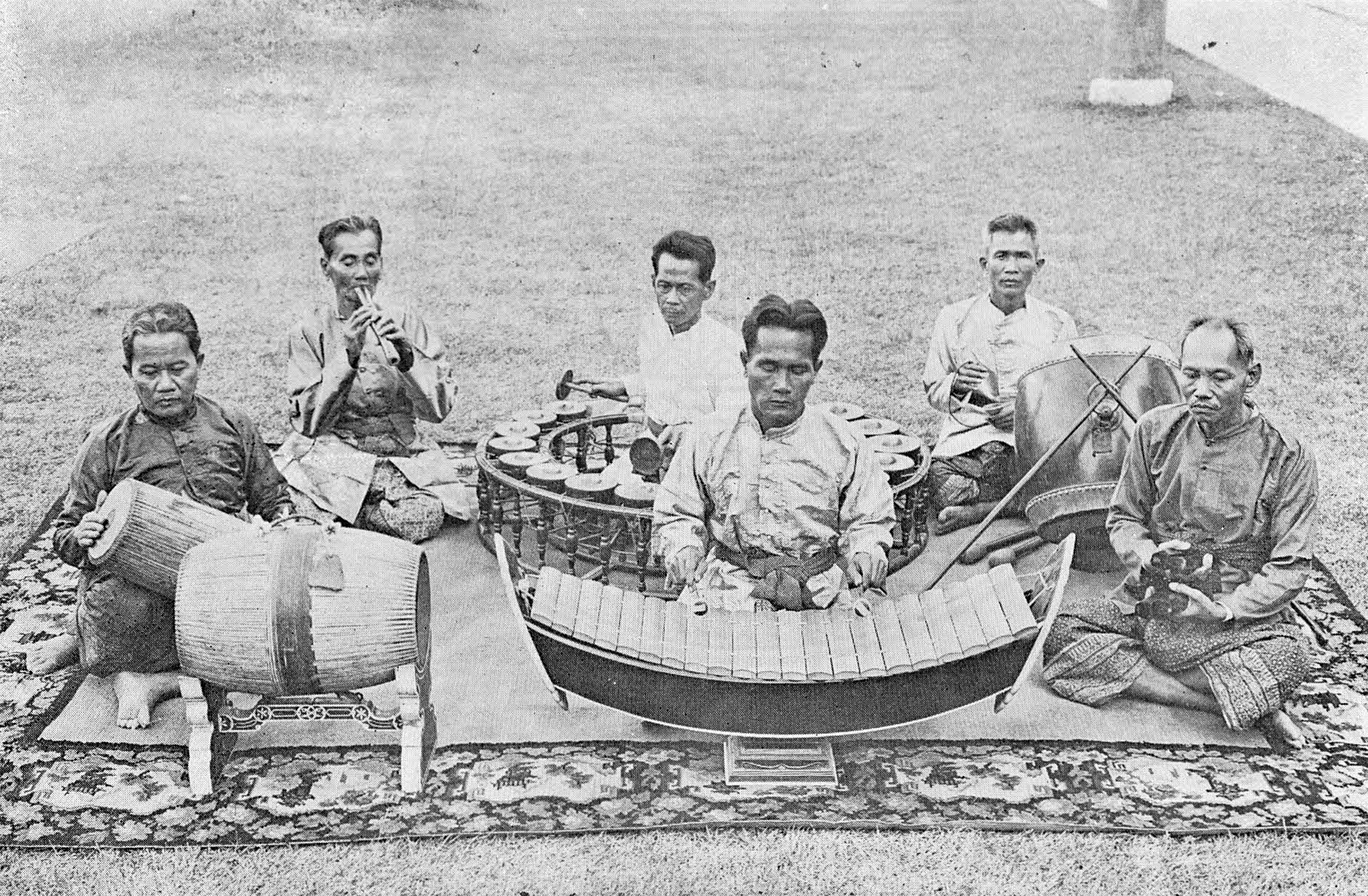
Piphat Khrueang Ha, 1930

Wong piphat khrueang ha (Thai: วงปี่พาทย์เครื่องห้า, Thai pronunciation: [woŋ pìːpʰâːt kʰrɯ̂əŋ hâː]) is an ensemble consisting of:

1. 1 pi nai - bass oboe
2. 1 taphon - secondary beat
3. 1 ching - main beat
4. 1 khong wong yai - bass gongs hung in a nearly full circular track
5. 2 glong thad - Thai tympani
6. 1 ranat ek - treble xylophone

=== Piphat khrueang khu ===
Wong piphat khrueang khu (Thai: วงปี่พาทย์เครื่องคู่, Thai pronunciation: [woŋ pìːpʰâːt kʰrɯ̂əŋ kʰûː]) is developed from piphat khrueang ha, by arranging instruments in pairs of treble-bass. It consists of:

1. 1 pi nai - bass oboe
2. 1 pi nok - treble oboe
3. 1 taphon - secondary timekeeper
4. 1 glong songna or 2 glong khaek
5. 2 glong thad - Thai tympani
6. 1 ching - main timekeeper
7. 1 chap
8. 1 khong wong yai - bass gongs hung in semicircular track
9. 1 khong wong lek - treble version of gongs hung in semicircular track
10. 1 khong mong
11. 1 ranat ek - treble xylophone
12. 1 ranat thum - bass xylophone

=== Piphat khrueang yai ===
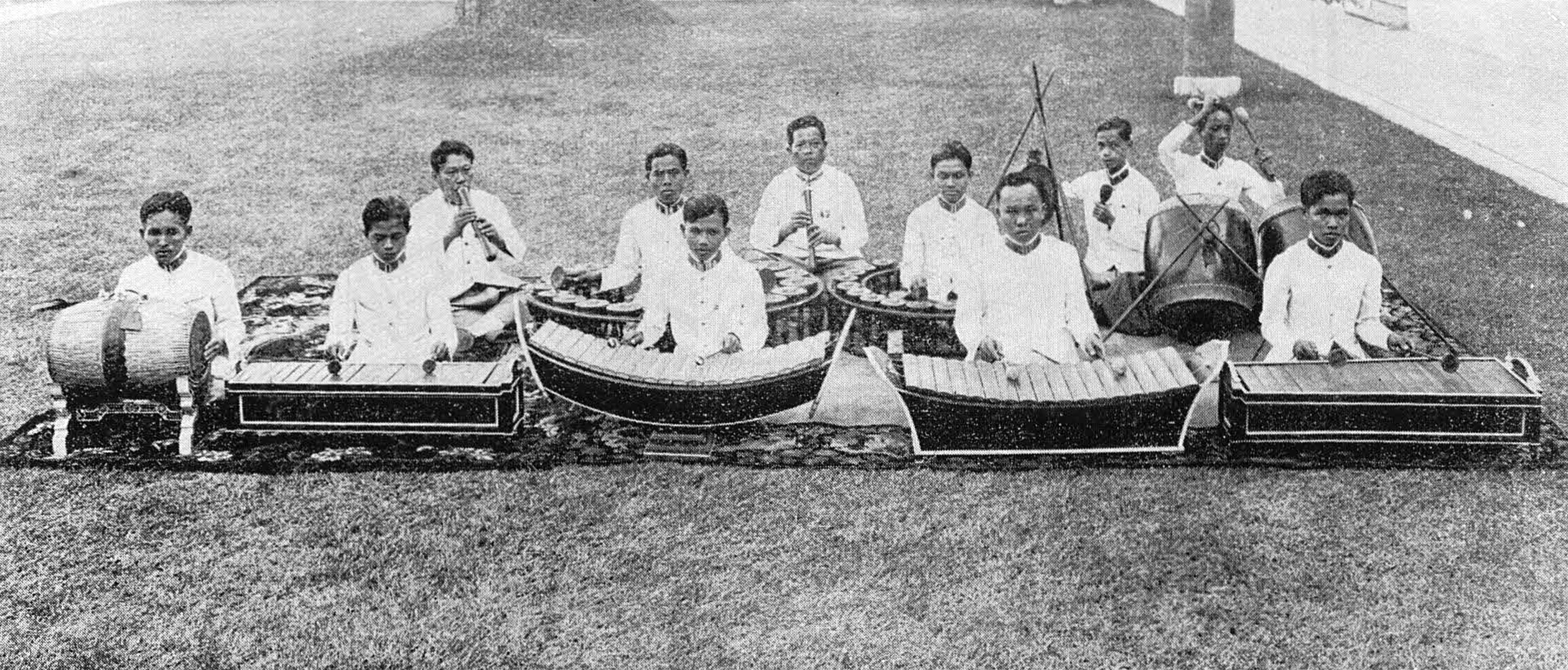
Piphat Khrueang Yai, 1930

Wong piphat khrueang yai (Thai: วงปี่พาทย์เครื่องใหญ่, Thai pronunciation: [woŋ pìːpʰâːt kʰrɯ̂əŋ jàj]) is arranged by adding ranat ek lek (ระนาดเอกเหล็ก; treble metallophone) and ranat thum lek (ระนาดทุ้มเหล็ก; bass metallophone) to the wong piphat khrueang khu.

=== Piphat nang hong ===
Wong piphat nang hong (Thai: วงปี่พาทย์นางหงส์, Thai pronunciation: [woŋ pìːpʰâːt naːŋ hǒŋ]) is an ensemble used in funerals. It is arranged by replacing the pi nai and pi nok with a pi chawa. The name nang hong comes from name of its main music, which is intended for funeral ceremonies. A royal variant for Thai royal funerals, Wong piphat nang hong khruang yai (for the King) or Wong piphat nang hong khrueang khu (for senior members of the Royal Family), introduced during the reign of King Vajiravudh (Rama VI) for use in royal funerals of the Chakri Dynasty, was reinstated during the reign of King Bhumibol Adulyadej (Rama IX) in 1995, during the state funeral rites for Srinagarindra, the Princess Mother, upon the initiative of Princess Maha Chakri Sirindhorn, the Princess Royal, after years of absence. If playing for the king, the royal funeral ensemble has 10 to 12 instruments played, a few more than the simple ensemble, for senior members 8 to 9 instruments are used.

In some funerals in Thailand the nang hong variant ensemble is supplemented by Western instruments like trumpets, saxophones, clarinets and even a drum kit, guitars and an electric piano. Some of these have also appeared in the normal ensembles.

=== Piphat duek dam ban ===
Wong piphat duek dam ban (Thai: วงปี่พาทย์ดึกดำบรรพ์, Thai pronunciation: [woŋ pìːpʰâːt dɯ̀k.dam.ban], literally "ancient ensemble") was proposed by Prince Naris. It consists of:

1. 1 ranat ek
2. 1 taphon
3. 1 ranat thum
4. 1 ranat thum lek
5. 1 khong wong yai
6. 1 ching
7. 1 taphon - "tympani" made by using two taphons arranged together.
8. 1 saw u
9. 1 khlui u - bass flute
10. 1 khlui phiang aw - medium
11. 1 wong khong chai - a set of 7 khong chai with different size hung on wooden bar.

=== Piphat mon ===
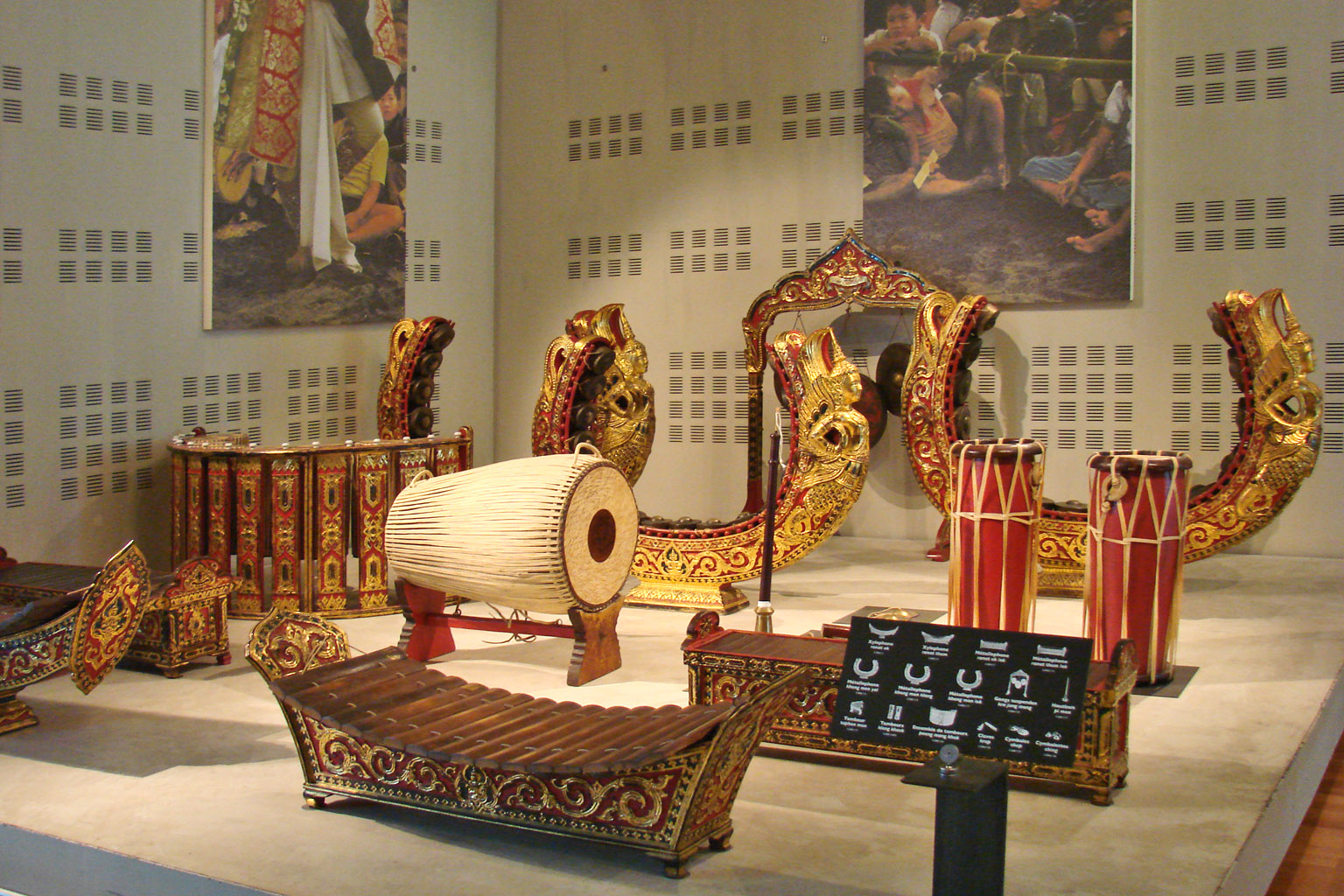
Piphat Mon exhibited at Cité de la Musique, Paris

The piphat mon is believed to derive from the Mon people and uses special instruments such as an upright gong circle called khong mon. Wong piphat mon (Thai: วงปี่พาทย์มอญ, Thai pronunciation: [woŋ pìːpʰâːt mɔːn]) has three sizes:

==== Piphat mon khrueang ha ====
Wong piphat mon khrueang ha (Thai: วงปี่พาทย์มอญเครื่องห้า, Thai pronunciation: [woŋ pìːpʰâːt mɔːn kʰrɯ̂əŋ hâː]) consists of:

1. 1 ranat ek
2. 1 pi mon - bass oboe with horn-shaped end.
3. 1 khong mon wong yai - a set of bass gongs set in vertical frame (unlike khong wong yai, which gongs are set in horizontal semicircular frame).
4. 1 poengmang khok (เปิงมางคอก) or khok poeng (คอกเปิง) - Mon drums set in cage-shaped frame.
5. ching, chap and khong mong

==== Piphat mon khrueang khu ====
Wong piphat mon khrueang khu (Thai: วงปี่พาทย์มอญเครื่องคู่, Thai pronunciation: [woŋ pìːpʰâːt mɔːn kʰrɯ̂əŋ kʰûː]) is arranged by adding ranat thum and khong mon wong lek to the piphat mon khrueang ha.

==== Piphat mon khrueang yai ====
Wong piphat mon khrueang yai (Thai: วงปี่พาทย์มอญเครื่องใหญ่, Thai pronunciation: [woŋ pìːpʰâːt mɔːn kʰrɯ̂əŋ jàj]) is arranged by adding ranat ek lek and ranat thum lek to the piphat mon khrueang khu.

The piphat mon ensemble is usually used in funerals, but it can be used for other events as well.

The piphat ensemble can be mixed with the khrueang sai ensemble to create a new ensemble called khrueang sai prasom piphat (เครื่องสายประสมปี่พาทย์ or เครื่องสายผสมปี่พาทย์). This hybrid or combined ensemble can also accommodate Western instruments as well.

== Similar ensembles ==
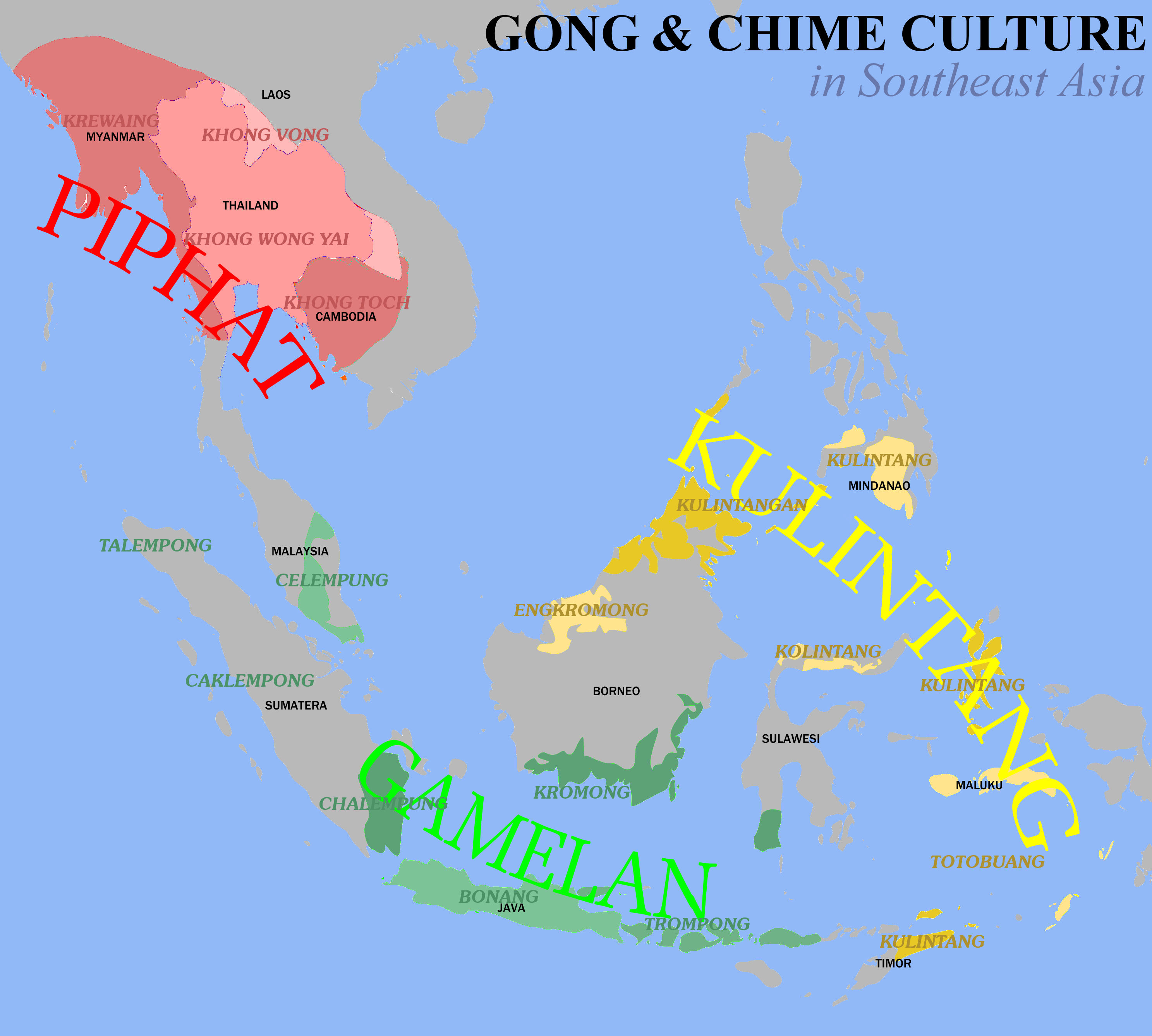
The three major indigenous genres of gong-chime music prevalent in Southeast Asia includes the gamelan of western Indonesia; the kulintang of the southern Philippines, eastern Indonesia, and eastern Malaysia; and the piphat of Cambodia, Thailand, Laos, and the hsaing waing of Burma.

The Cambodian's Khmer equivalent of the piphat is called pinpeat. The Myanmar equivalent to piphat is known as hsaing waing. The instrumentation is very similar to the Piphat Mon, which indicates a common origin.

Gong-chime ensembles are also found in other Southeast Asian nations, such as Gamelan in Indonesia, and Kulintang in the Philippines.

Gong-chime ensembles can also be found in Vietnam, although they're no longer played among the ethnic Viet, they're still played among the indigenous peoples in the Space of gong culture, as well as among the Muong people and the Thổ people.

== See also ==
- Pinpeat
- Hsaing waing
- Khruang sai
- Mahori
- Music of Thailand
- Gamelan
- Korphai
