= Skor thom =

Unpitched percussion instrument

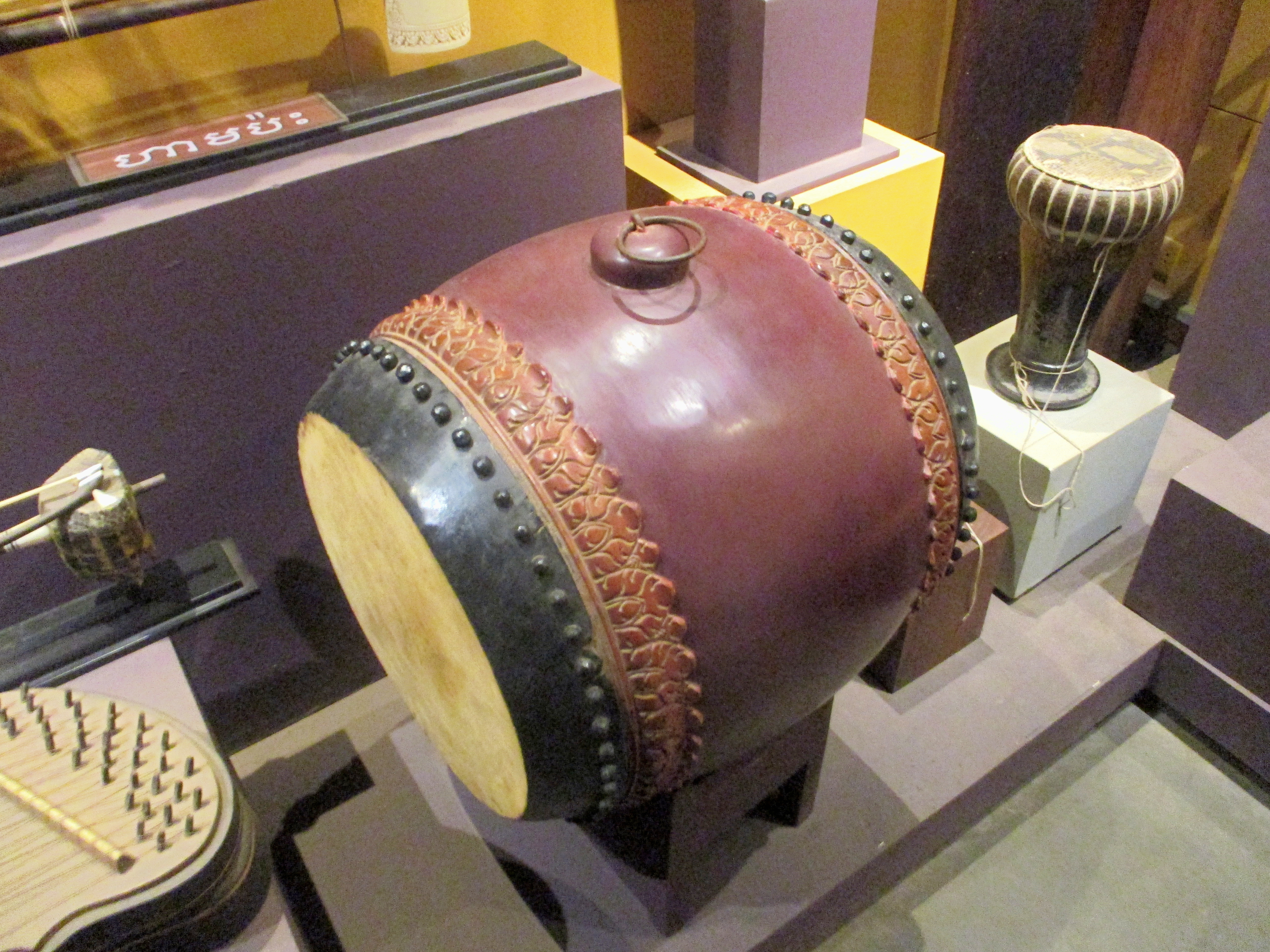
- Skor thom at the "Sounds of Angkor" exhibition in Theam's Gallery, Siem Reap, Cambodia.
- Classification: Percussion (Membranophone)

Related instruments
- glong chatri

The Skor thom (Khmer: ស្គរធំ) are Cambodian 2-headed barrel drums played with a pair of wooden drumsticks. They typically have skin heads made from oxen, cows or buffalos, and are played in pairs. The drums are tuned such that one will give a "tighter and louder" sound when struck, while the other gives a "loose and more flatter tone." The log is hollowed out to form a thin tube, about 1 centimeter thick, and the hide is stretched out on each side to create the drum. Dimensions for the instruments vary, as they are carved from logs; however they can measure 50 centimetres long and be 46 centimetres in across at the center of the drum, with the ends being about 40 centimetres wide.

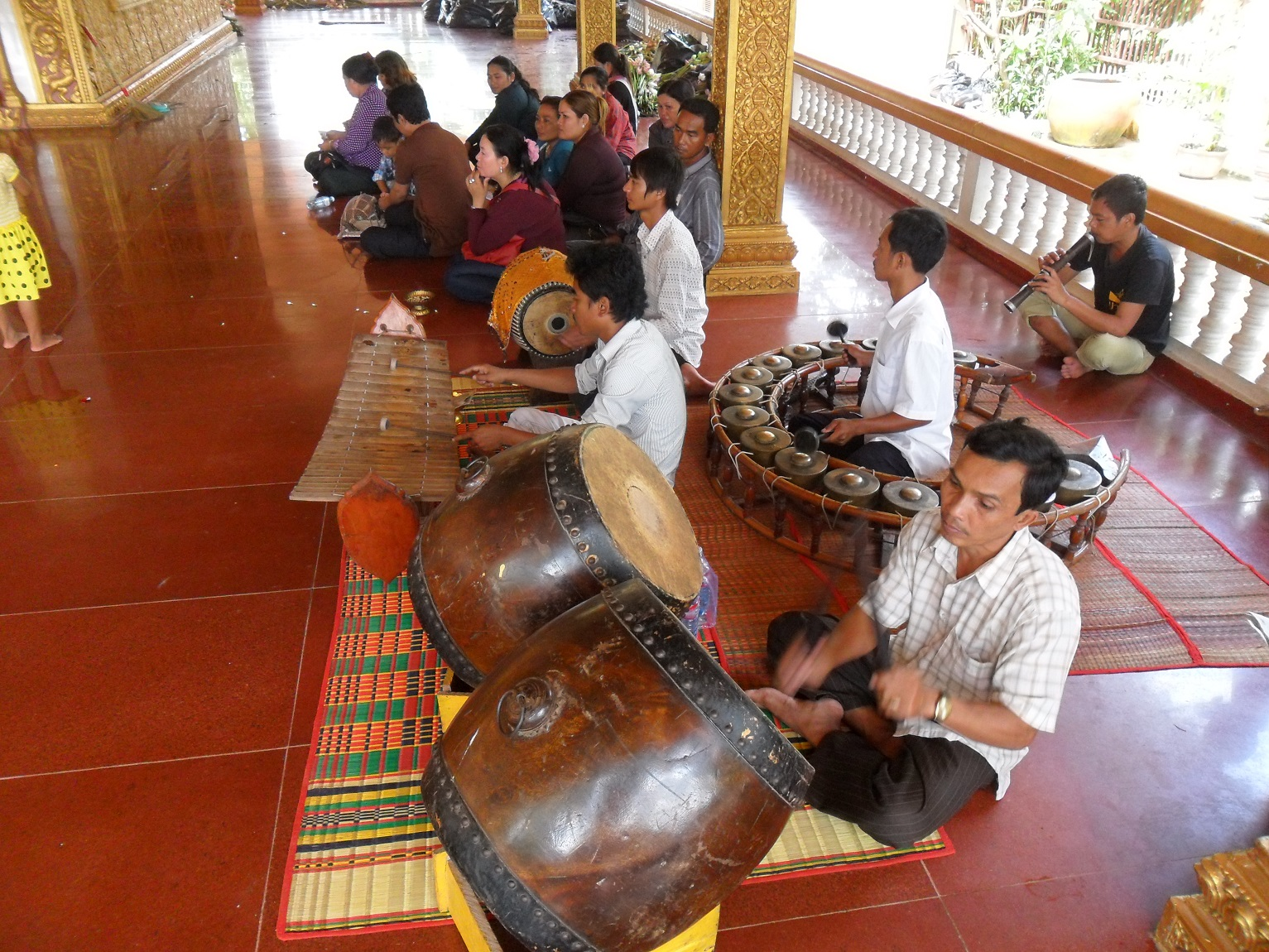
Orchestra of Cambodian instruments with skor thom on the foreground.

The instruments are used in the pinpeat orchestra, placed at the front of the orchestra as a lead or dominant instrument. They are also used with the sralay oboe in music for freestyle boxing music. Sometimes, the drummer will play a skor thom and a Samphor at the same time.

Equivalent to Thai glong chatri.
