= Skor sang na =

Type of ceremonial barrel drum

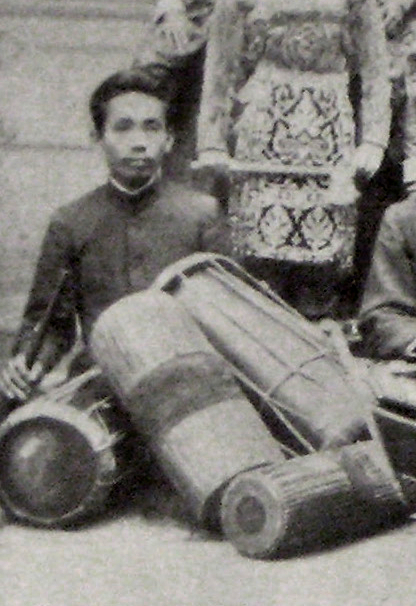
Center and bottom drums, Cambodian skor sang na drums. Far left and far right drums, Thai Klong khaek drums. Image taken Thailand about 1900 A.D.

The skor sang na or sko chhneah is a Cambodian barrel drum, similar in shape to the samphor but smaller, measuring 60 centimeters by 20 centimeters. The instrument is small enough to carry. Like the skor chaiyam which has a strap to allow the instrument to be carried in parades, the skor sang also has a strap. However, rather than cheerful parades, it had a more solemn purpose, playing in funeral processions and ceremonies. Used to play "Khlang Chanack" funeral music.

Equivalent to the Thailand Klong song na drum.

== See also ==
- Music of Cambodia
