= Klong that =

Thai barrel drums

(Thai: กลองทัด, pronounced [klɔːŋ tʰát]) are large barrel drums used in the classical music of Thailand. They are played with large wooden sticks. They are usually played in a pair and used in the piphat ensemble. Drums of this kind have also been called klong chatri (กลองชาตรี) and klong túk (กลองตุ๊ก).

A similar drum, called skor thom, is used in Cambodian classical music.

The "Klong That" is a cylindrical drum with a slightly flared shape in the middle, resembling a barrel. It has two drumheads, each secured by pins called "Sae," (แส้) traditionally made of elephant skin, animal bones, or metal. Usually play using two drumsticks. Each set of drumsticks has two ends: one producing a high-pitched sound called "Tua phu"(ตัวผู้) (male) and the other producing a low-pitched sound called "Tua mia"(ตัวเมีย) (female). The "Tua Phu" is positioned on the right side of the drummer, while the "Tua mia" is on the left.

The "Klong That" is believed to be an ancient Thai drum and has been used in traditional Thai music performances since ancient times up to the present day, often played as part of traditional Thai orchestras.

The "Klong That" drum is a percussion instrument in the Thai musical tradition, categorized as a rhythmic accompaniment instrument. It is played in conjunction with the "Ta Phon" (ตะโพน) Thai drum, where the "Klong That" typically plays the primary beats, leaving gaps in between beats for the "Ta Phon" to fill in with additional rhythms. This interaction between the two instruments ensures synchronization according to the song's rhythm.

While most songs utilize both the "Klong That" and "Ta Phon," there are some pieces where only the "Klong That" is played without the "Ta Phon" accompaniment.

== History ==
The Klong That is a large drum belonging to the Attavitta category, primarily used in the Suvarnabhumi region and its surrounding areas. Historical records indicate that during the period between 298 and 342 AD, there were two Thai kingdoms known as the Chok and Ba regions, situated in the central part of the Yangtze River basin. The "Cho" kingdom, ruled by King Chor Pa Ong from 310 to 343 B.E., was identified as a Thai ethnic group during that time.

It is documented that China acquired musical instruments from the Thai people residing in the southern part of the river basin, particularly along the Yangtze. Notably, a type of drum still utilized in China today is referred to as the "Nan Tang Ku," denoting drums of the Southern people. This drum closely resembles the Thai "That" drum, signifying its Thai origin since ancient times.

The term "Nan Tang Ku" comprises three words: "Nan," meaning Southern or Tai; "Tang," possibly derived from the Tang Dynasty (1161-1443); and "Ku," translating to drum. The influence of Tang Dynasty music extended to neighboring countries like Korea and Japan, where a similar drum, known as "Tang ko," served as the prototype for Japan's large Taiko drum.

Considering historical and contemporary evidence, It is evident that the drum holds widespread popularity across Southeast Asian countries such as Cambodia, Laos, China, Japan, and Korea. It is believed to have been influenced by the Thai Nan Tang Ku drum. Additionally, a drum akin to the Thai version, named the "Nobud drum," is utilized in India for evening fanfare ceremonies, as mentioned in historical accounts from Varanasi and in ancient texts such as San Somdej's, volume 7.

The Klong Tad drum holds significant cultural relevance in Thai society and is referred to by different names depending on the occasion. For instance, it is commonly known as the "Pel drum."

In the daily life of Thai people, especially within temple grounds, the Klong Tad plays a vital role. In many temples, a campanile is present, housing both bells and drums close together. These instruments are used to mark the passage of time and signal various events. For instance, at 11:00 a.m., monks, novices, or temple attendees play the drums to signal lunchtime, indicating to locals that it's time to gather for a meal. Around 4:30 p.m., the monks ring the bell, signaling their descent to the church for evening prayers. After evening prayers, typically around 6:00 p.m., the monks leave the temple.

Additionally, the Talum Tum Meng, also known as "Tee yum kum," uses alternating bell and drum sounds to alert residents to the approaching dusk, signifying the end of the monk's prayers. Villagers in the vicinity hear these sounds, which signify the completion of various tasks and prompt them to join in celebrating merits.

Furthermore, the Klong Tad or Pel drum plays a role in various religious activities within the temple. It is utilized to alert the community when unfortunate events occur, such as theft or emergencies, prompting villagers to come together and assist in resolving the situation.

== Construction of Klong That ==
=== Component of Klong That ===
The components of Klong (Drum) can be described as follows: There are two drums in total. Both drums have components. Similar drums differ only in pitch. The components of the drum can be divided into 7 parts as follows:

1.) The ear loop serves as an aid in inserting the trestle.

2.) The drum body acts as the sound box for the Tad drum.

3.) The front of the drum serves as the part that gives the sound of the drum when it vibrates. The area in front of the drum made a loud drum.

4.) The trestle serves as a device to help support the drum so that it can be set up and tilted

5.) The whip serves to hold the drum skin on the drum puppet.

6.) The Tad drumstick acts as a device for playing the Tad drum.

7.) Pillow serves to support the bottom of the front of the drum.

=== The main tools for constructing drums ===
No.	Name of material equipment
1	Lathe (เครื่องกลึง)
2	Reamer (เครื่องคว้าน)
3	Leather stretcher (แป้นขึงหนัง)
4	Leather planing knife (มีดไสหนัง)
5	Compass (วงเวียน)
6	Hammer (ค้อน)
7	Leather cutting knife (มีดตัดหนัง)
8	Spiral steel for stretching leather (เหล็กเกลียวขึงหนัง)
9	Steel stretched over leather (เหล็กสาแหรกขึงหนัง)
10	Drill (สว่าน)
11	Drill bits (ดอกสว่าน)
12	Steel whip (เหล็กแส้)
13	Paintbrush (พู่กัน)
14	Rak latex or black quick-drying ink (น้ำยางรัก หรือสีดำชนิดแห้งเร็ว)
15	Leather hammer (เหล็กตอกหนัง)
16	Sandpaper (กระดาษทราย)
17	Wood splinter polish (นำ้ยากัดเสี้ยนไม้)
18	Unithane (นำ้ยาเคลือบเงาชนิดแข็ง)
19	Leather cushion (หนังรองกระแทก)
20	Grinding machine (เครื่องเจียร)
21	Leather soaking container (บ่อแช่หนัง)
22	Moth repellent (นำ้ยากันมอด)
23	Welded steel (เหล็กเชื่อมสาแหรก)
24	Tape measure (ตลับเมตร)
25	Shellac coating (เคลือบแชล็ค)
26	White clay filler (ดินสอพอง)
27	Rice beater (เครื่องตีข้าว)
28	Buffalo leather (หนังควาย)
29	Neem wood (ไม้สะเดา)
30	Rain tree (ไม้ก้ามปู)

=== The procedure of Constructing Klong That ===
The primary materials used in crafting drums are pieces of wood, particularly Neem and Claw wood, along with buffalo leather for the drumhead. The manufacturing process begins with cutting logs to the desired size and then shaping and hollowing them out to prepare them for use.

Once a prototype drum is fashioned, the leather is prepared by soaking buffalo hide in water, preferably aged or "rotten" water, for approximately 12 hours to expedite softening. Once sufficiently firm, the leather is marked using a compass to draw circles and chalk to designate points.

Next, attention turns to achieving the desired drum sound. Tension in the drumhead is crucial for optimal vibration, achieved by carefully thinning the soaked leather within the marked circle using a specialized leather planing knife. This meticulous process, typically performed while the leather is still damp, demands skill and experience to execute effectively.

To reinforce the perimeter where holes will be drilled for threading, the outer edge of the marked circle is intentionally left thicker. This precautionary measure helps prevent tearing during subsequent assembly.

Traditionally, artisans employ an age-old technique of massaging the leather to enhance its suppleness, adapting ancient rice beaters to knead the leather akin to rice pounding. Once prepared, the leather is left to dry in the sun for one to two days before being stretched over the drum body.

== Performance ==
=== Traditional Thai musical ensemble ===
The "Klong That" drum is primarily used in traditional Thai musical ensembles called "Wong piphat mai khaeng," (วงปี่พาทย์ไม้แข็ง) which accompany performances or ceremonies. These ceremonies are often associated with Buddhist rituals and ceremonies. The ensemble typically consists of "Piphat" bamboo flutes and the "Klong That" drum is an essential part of this ensemble. For instance, it is used in international festivals, Thai music teacher homage ceremonies, and Thai classical performances.

The "Klong That" drum is a percussion instrument in the Thai musical tradition, categorized as a rhythmic accompaniment instrument. It is played in conjunction with the "Ta Phon" (ตะโพน) Thai drum, where the "Klong That" typically plays the primary beats, leaving gaps in between beats for the "Ta Phon" to fill in with additional rhythms. This interaction between the two instruments ensures synchronization according to the song's rhythm.

While most songs utilize both the "Klong That" and "Ta Phon," there are some pieces where only the "Klong That" is played without the "Ta Phon" accompaniment.

In particular, during performances in the "Chut Hom Rong Yen" (ชุดโหมโรงเย็น) ensemble, the "Klong That" drum plays a significant role, providing rhythmic accompaniment for every song except for the "Sathukan" (สาธุการ) song, which is performed solely with the "Ta Phon" drum. Due to this, the role of the "Klong That" drum in musical accompaniment is not inferior to other instruments in the traditional Thai ensemble. However, the "Klong That" drum also plays a crucial role in warfare. The army leader would give the signal "Phree San," (เภรีสัญญ) which translates to "the signal of the drum," to convey news, boost the morale of the soldiers, and prepare them to confront the enemy (Anan Nakkong, 2537: 18).

The "Klong That" drum is primarily used in traditional Thai musical ensembles called "Wong piphat mai khaeng," (วงปี่พาทย์ไม้แข็ง) which accompany performances or ceremonies. These ceremonies are often associated with Buddhist rituals and ceremonies. The ensemble typically consists of "Piphat" bamboo flutes and the "Klong That" drum is an essential part of this ensemble. For instance, it is used in international festivals, Thai music teacher homage ceremonies, and Thai classical performances.

=== Architecture drum ===
The origin of the name " Architecture Drum " is from the architecture faculty of Chulalongkorn University. It is the first architecture in Thailand where this drum is played. In the past, Chula used a Tom drum to play. It was a foreign drum, so Her Royal Highness Princess Maha Chakri Sirindhorn gave the Klong That as a faculty drum for the five universities that received it, including Chulalongkorn University, Kasetsart University, Silpakorn University, Khon Kaen University and Chiang Mai University

Then architecture faculties from various universities started to use Klong as the identity of architecture faculties throughout the country. It has become a tradition that Every architecture faculty must have its own drum. There is the same selection of people.

The annual Tapad Sampan is an event where architects and architecture students from across the country gather to foster professional and academic networks. The event features drum competitions, university-specific musical performances, knowledge-sharing sessions, and social activities.

== See also ==
- Traditional Thai musical instruments
