= Barrel drum =

Class of musical instruments

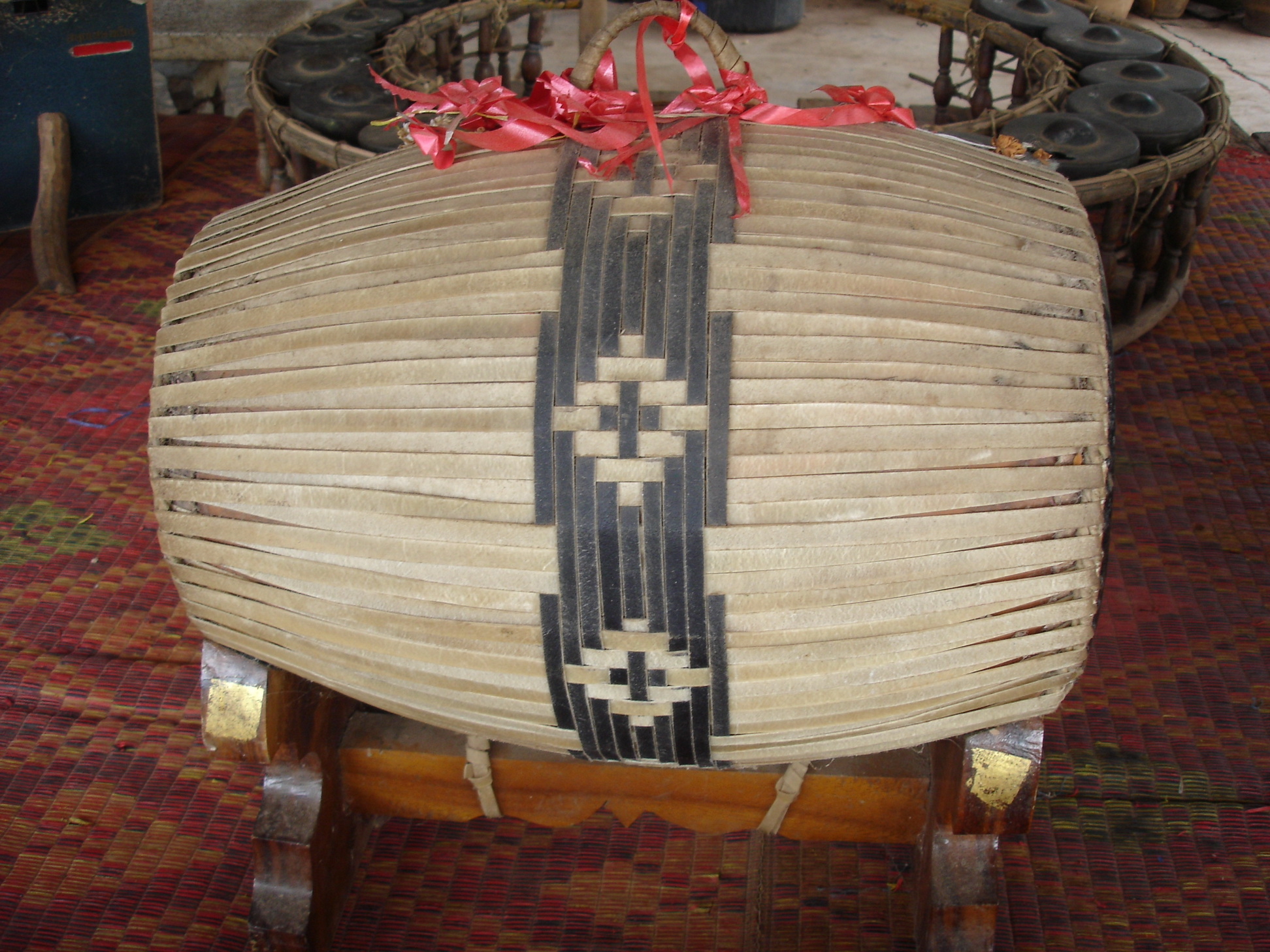
The taphon, a barrel drum of Thailand

Barrel drums are a class of membranophone, or drum, characterized by a barrel-shape with a bulge in the middle. They can be one-headed and open at the bottom, or two-headed at opposite ends. Examples include the Vietnamese trong chau and the bendre of the Mossi of Burkina Faso.

== Barrel drums ==
- Buk – Korea
- Conga – Cuba
- Dhak – India
- Dhol – India
- Dholak – North India, Pakistan, and Nepal
- Geta beraya – Sri Lanka
- Glong khaek – Thailand
- Glong songna – Thailand
- Glong thad – Thailand
- Kebero – Ethiopia
- Kendhang – Indonesia
- Khol – India
- Mridangam – South India
- Pakhawaj – North India
- Sang Na – Cambodia
- Sampho – Cambodia
- Tanbou – Haiti
- Tanggu – China
- Taphon – Thailand
- Trống chầu – Vietnam
