= Pinpeat =

Khmer traditional musical ensemble

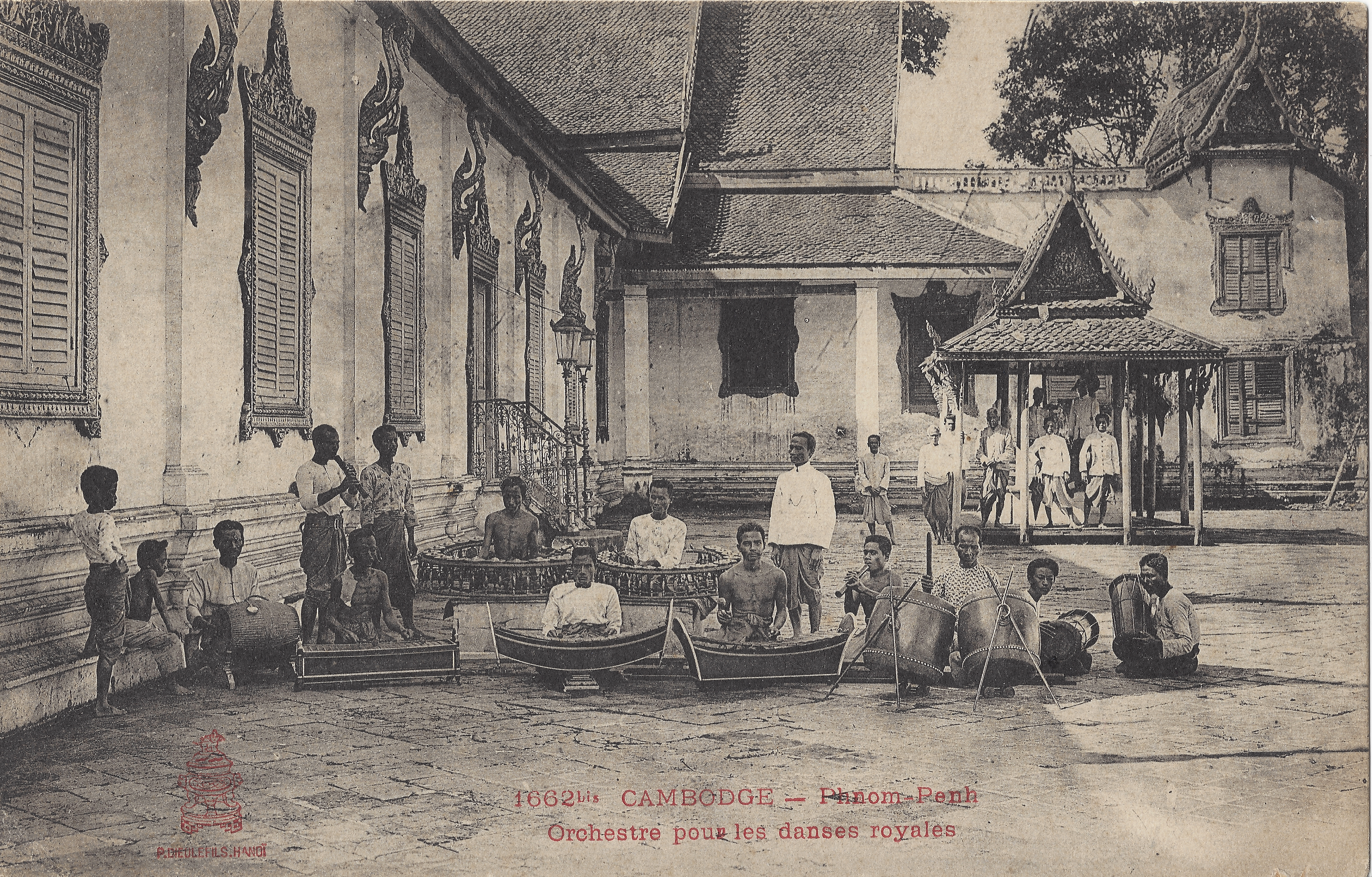
Royal dance orchestra, Phnom Penh, c. 1907. Instruments from the left: front row: samphor drum, roneat dek (metallophone), roneat ek (bamboo xylophone), roneat thung (bamboo xylophone), sralai reed pipe, skor thom drums, other drums. Back row from the left: sralai, kong von thom, kong von toch.

The Pinpeat (Khmer: ពិណពាទ្យ, romanized: pĭnpiat; [pɨn.piət]) is the largest Khmer traditional musical ensemble. It has performed the ceremonial music of the royal courts and temples of Cambodia since ancient times. The orchestra consists of approximately nine or ten instruments, mainly wind and percussion (including several varieties of xylophone and drums). It accompanies court dances, masked plays, shadow plays, and religious ceremonies. This ensemble is originated in Cambodia since before Angkorian era.

The pinpeat is analogous to the pinphat adopted from the Khmer court by the Lao people and the piphat ensemble of Thailand.

== Etymology ==
According to Chuon Nath's Khmer dictionary, the 'Pinpeat' is composed of the Sanskrit terms vina/ pin (វិណ) referring to the pin (harp), which was formerly used as the premiere instrument in this ensemble, and vadya/ padya/ peat (វាទ្យ) referring to an ensemble of instruments.

According to Sonankavei, the professor from the Department of Music of the Cambodian Royal University of Fine Art, the word pinpeat is derived from the combination of two musical instruments including pin (harp) and vadya/ peat, referring to a genre of kong called kongpeat.

The Laotian adoption of Khmer pinpeat is called pinphat. The term piphat was also used among Cambodians familiar with the Thai language; this can be attributed to the former annexation of the northern provinces of Cambodia, however, Pinpeat in fact originated from Cambodia.

== History ==
Peat

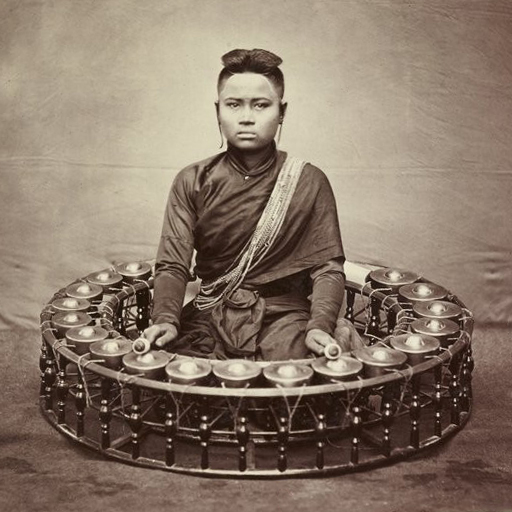
Instrument labeled "peatkong" c. 1870 at the Cambodian court. Today known as the kong von toch, it may generically be called gong chimes.

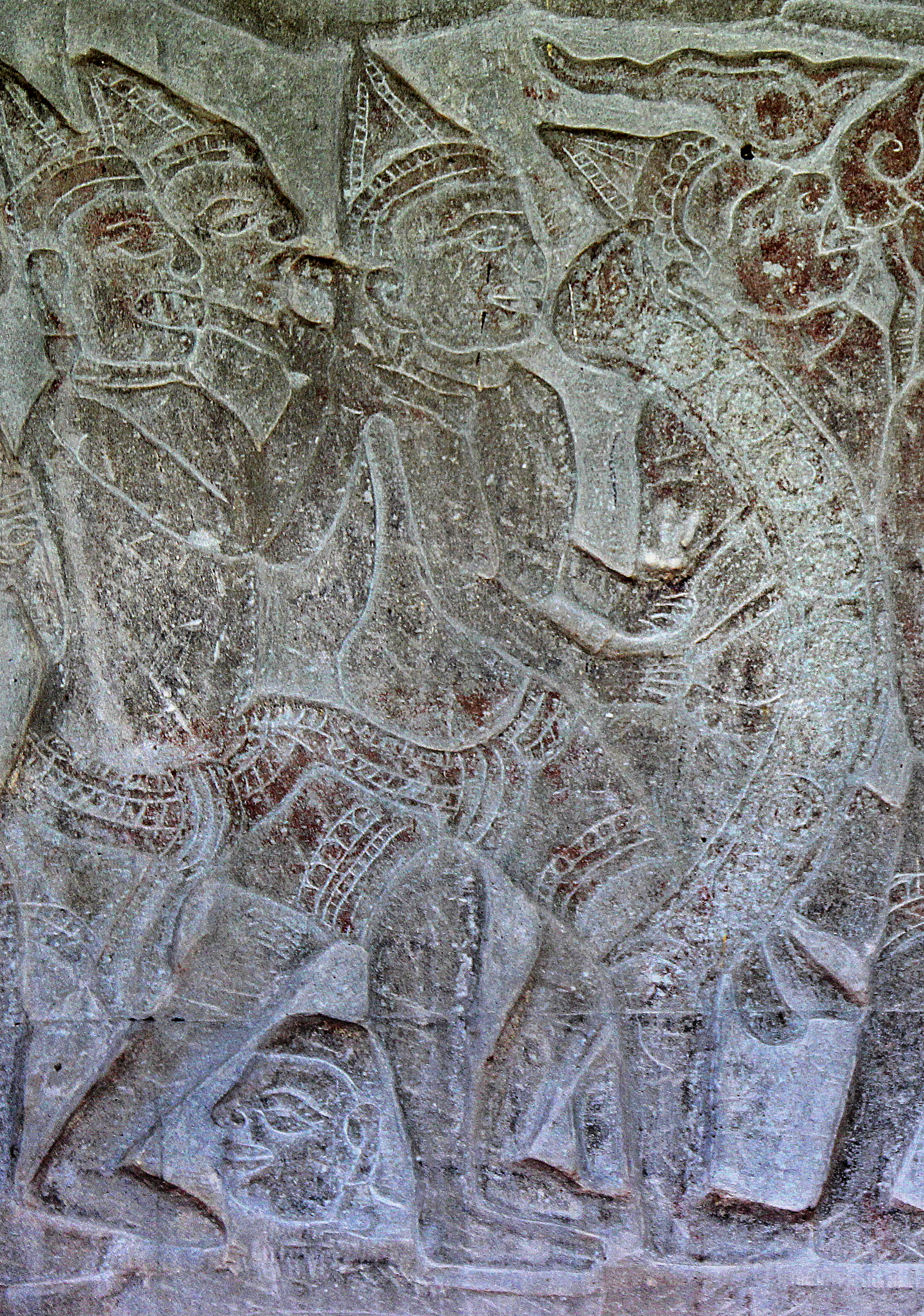
Gong chimes from Angkor Wat. May be called peatkong or kongpeat.

The history of the pinpeat can be traced back to the of origins Khmer music. The orchestra and its lead instrument of that era, the pin (harp), were introduced to early Khmer kingdoms from India, where the pin was depicted far back as the Gupta period (3rd century a.d. – 543 a.d.). An example from that era can be seen in a relief at the Pawaya site in modern Madhya Pradesh, India. The pin may have been introduced to Cambodia in its first kingdom, Funan; however, few structures and evidence remain from this period.

The earliest surviving depiction of the pin in Cambodia is dated to the 7th century on the temple at Sambor Prey Kuk, part of another Khmer kingdom known in Chinese record as Chenla, the successor of Funan. This instrument appeared in Hindu religious art in temples from the 7th to 13th centuries A.D. The instrument was frequently seen being depicted on the walls of Sambor Prey Kuk, Banteay Chhmar, Bayon, and other Khmer temples. During the Angkor era (9th — 15th centuries a.d.), it was played in the royal Khmer ensemble and disappeared at the end of 12th century Although the pin disappeared from pinpeat ensemble for some 800 years, the Khmer still called this kind of ensemble what it had been called since the ancient time. In 2013, the pin was revived by Patrick Kersalé, a French ethnomusicologist and Sonankavei, a Cambodian musical craftsman and professor. Modern musicians have begun experimenting, reincorporating the pin into the pinpeat, its place in the Angkorian court 800 years ago.

In 2014, more than 200 paintings were revealed at Angkor. The pinpeat ensemble was depicted in two hidden images discovered on the magnificent temple's wall. One of two images that depicted the pinpeat ensemble can be seen clearly through computer-enhancement and it is identical to today's pinpeat orchestra, including the absent pin. Pipeat was also regarded as the royal ensemble and accompanied in Khmer traditional and royal festivities in the post-Angkorian periods until today.

The pinpeat, in its form originating in India, consisted of four musical instruments, the pin (harp), (Khloy) flute, (samphor) drum, and chhing (small cymbals), based on an Indian epic. The narration said that "One day, Shiva [who] resides in the gods assembly on the summit of Kailasa, intended to perform a dance. So he ordered Uma to reside on the golden throne, Sarasvati to play pin (vina), Indra to play the flute, Brahma to play chhing (cymbals), Laksmi to sing, and so that other devas and asuras would watch the performance..." Later on, more musical instruments were added or replaced by others and developed to form a unique Khmer musical ensemble.

Today, the pinpeat incorporates kong gong chimes, such as the kong von thom, as lead instruments. This dates back as far as the Angkorian period, when there was a group of musicians called the kongpit/ kongpeat. Organized music in this period was centered around religious and royal organizations. On one side, two groups of musician served the Khmer brahmins and the buddhists, while on the other side, the pinpheat reflected the power of the Angkorian monarch.

The pinpheat may have debuted in Southeast Asia during the first Khmer kingdom of Funan (1st-6th century AD). During that kingdom's existence, Indian religions, culture and traditions were introduced to Southeast Asia, beginning as early as the 1st century a.d. During the Funan period, there was a group of musicians called pinpang, and the pin was used as an instrument in the group. During the reign of Funan king Fan Chan (or Fan Siyon), 225-250 a.d., the country "entered relations" with the Murunda Dynasty, who ruled Kalinga in India.

King Fan Chan is also known today for establishing relations with a ruler in Southern China during the Three Kingdoms period, sending as a present some musicians and products of the country to the "Kingdom of Kra Vo under the reign of the King Sun Chorn" (sometimes labeled "Chinese Emperor") in Southern China in 243 a.d. Another record mentioned the Khmer musicians from Funan which visited China in 236 CE. The Chinese emperor was so impressed that he even ordered the institute of Funanese music near Naking. Another Chinese source also mentioned the famous music of Funan (Cambodia) that became popular and was played at the courts of Sui and Tang dynasties. This “Funan music” was a ritual music and dance form with Buddhist coloring from the pre-Angkorian kingdom of Funan (Khmer, Nokor Phnom).

== Instruments used in Pinpeat ensembles ==
This list presents instruments which are or have been used in various Pinpeat ensembles.

- Roneat - xylophones
  - roneat ek - the lead high-pitched bamboo xylophone.
  - roneat thung - a xylophone, lower pitched than the roneat ek
- Roneat - metallophones
  - roneat dek
  - roneat thong
- Drums
  - skor thom - two big drums (similar to taiko drums) played with drumsticks
  - samphor - a double-headed drum played with hands
- Sralai - a quadruple-reed
  - sralai thom - a large quadruple-reed flute
  - sralai toch - a small quadruple-reed flute
- Khloy - a type of bamboo flute (was used in place of the sralai in the past)
- Chhing (chhap) - finger cymbals
- Krap - wooden clappers (presently rarely used)

== Type of Pinpeat Ensemble ==
Pipeat ensemble divided into different type depend on the instruments accompanied in its ensemble.

=== Pinpeat Vong Touch (Small Pinpeat Ensemble) ===
This small Pinpeat ensemble was thought to be the initial Pinpeat orchestra played since its origin until today, consisted of a few musical instruments such as:

- Pin (obsolete)

1. Roneat ek (1)
2. Kong vong thum (1)
3. Skor thum (2)
4. Samphor (1)
5. Sralai (1)

=== Pinpeat Vong Thum (Big Pinpeat Ensemble) ===
Since its introduction from India, the initial Pinpeat ensemble had been developed as more musical instruments were added or replaced by other local instruments. In the 3rd century, more instruments were added to the ensemble by Khmer craftsman and musicians. There we can see the emergence of various percussive instruments into the initial Pinpeat ensemble such as roneat thung, roneat dek, kong vong touch, sralai touch,..

The insert of these local instruments into the initial Pinpeat ensemble (small pinpeat ensemble) make the music made by the ensemble more flawless, gentle, and melodious than it previously do. This ensemble is called Pinpeat Vong Thum (Big Pinpeat Ensemble) with more instruments:

- Pin (obsolete)

1. Roneat ek (1)
2. Roneat thung (1)
3. Roneat dek (1)
4. Kong vong thum (1)
5. Kong vong touch (1)
6. Sralai (1)
7. Skor thum (2)
8. Samphor (1)
9. Chhing (1 pair)

== List of Pinpeat songs ==
Today, there are more than 250 Pinpeat songs being researched based on a document found in the street of Phnom Penh in 1979 after Khmer Rouge collapsed. These songs narrated various stories such as describing love, nature, Khmer daily life and its neighbors, and else. While some specific musics are used to accompany in Khmer traditional dances and theaters.

=== Pinpeat musics used for Khol Masked Drama and Sbek Thom (Khmer Shadow theatre) ===
Sathukar is the principle Cambodian Pinpeat music plays for the opening of Khmer traditional festivities and rituals. Sathukar accompanies in Cambodian Royal Ballets, Masked Drama, Shadow Theatre, and many other traditional dances and rituals. The music list below is played in accordance to various episodes in Masked Drama and Shadow theatre.

1. Sathukar: accompanied in for the opening rituals of the drama and paying homage to ancestral guru.
2. Bot Ror: played for the magical and power expression episodes
3. Bot Chert: played for traveling and warring episode
4. Bot S'mer: played during the paying respect and taking a rest episode
5. Bot Trak: making magics, transforming physical appearance or while shooting an arrow episode
6. Bot Domner Knung: played during the marching of giant troops episode
7. Bot Domner Krav: played for the human and monkey marching episode
8. Bakthorm: for monkey troops marching episode
9. Bonh Lea: used for the ending or departure (good bye) episode
10. Bot Ot Toch: played during the hardship, crying (for human, giant, and monkey) episode
11. Bot Ot Thum: played during the hardship, break up, crying down (for human and monkey characters)
12. Bot Tayoy: played during sentiment anxiety (for human characters)
13. Bot Chert Chhoerng: played during arrow shooting or undermine the ritual episode
14. Bot Neang Lot: played for comedian character or the traveling of the locals
15. Bot Chert Chhab: played for monkeys wrestling episode
16. Bot Khlom: played during the march of devatas, Indra episode
17. Bot Pon Nhea: accompanied during the return of Preah Ream/ Rama's troops episode

=== Pinpeat Song narrating Khmer daily activities ===
1. Khmer Preah Bantum
2. Khmer Tumnerb (Modern Khmer)
3. Khmer Chrot Srov (Khmer harvests rice)
4. Khmer Dambaanh (Khmer weaves (textile)
5. Khmer Bompe Kon (Khmer lulls the child)
6. Khmer Yol Tong (Khmer swings the swing)
7. Kamrong Phuong Khmer (Khmer flower braid)
8. Khmer Plum Sloek (Khmer blows the leaf)
9. Domner Khmer (Khmer walking)
10. Khmer Pursat
11. Khmer Kruosar (Family Khmer)

=== Pinpeat Songs related with Khmer neighbors; Chen (Chinese), Chvea (Javanese), Leav (Laotian), Mon, Pumea (Bamar), and Kuy. ===
1. Chen Louk Thnam (Chen Sae)
2. Chen Bong (Chen Chombong)
3. Chen Chas
4. Chen Chong Srok
5. Chen Tver Chhnang
6. Chen Berk Viangnon
7. Chen Jos Touk
8. Chen Tror Kaew
9. Chen Chhor Muk Tuok
10. Chen Bang Tang Yu
11. Chen Bes Sloek Chher
12. Domner Chen
13. Chvea Srok Mon Pi Nakk
14. Chvea Srok Mon Bei Nakk
15. Chvea Srok Mon Bei Joan
16. Chvea Tromiak Domrei
17. Chvea Pho Kda
18. Chvea Roam Phlet
19. Chvea P'nek Khla
20. Chvea Lerng Rong
21. Chvea Srav Yuth'ka
22. Chvea Der Tes
23. Chvea Der Phum
24. Chvea Reach Borei
25. Chvea Nop Borei
26. Chvea Srok Chav Sen
27. Chvea K'soek K'soul
28. Rabam Chvea
29. Phleng Chvea
30. Mon Jos Tuok
31. Mon Yol Dav
32. Roam Mon
33. Phleng Mon
34. Mon Samai
35. Leav Piek Kra'op
36. Leav P'song Tien
37. Tomnounh Leav
38. Samdech Leav
39. Leav Ruom Chet
40. Srei Leav Laor
41. Chiet Leav
42. Somrerb Chet Leav
43. Kon Chiet Leav
44. Teahean Chiet Leav
45. Nisai Leav
46. Robam Leav
47. Leav Antrong Moan
48. Leav Lerng Chrang
49. Leav Tiak Rolok
50. Leav Der Prei
51. Leav Sorser Preah Chan
52. Phumea Hor
53. Kuy Kong Leng

=== Pinpeat Songs that describe others ===
1. Roam Phlet
2. Domner Yeut
3. Domner Rohas
4. Bes Bopha
5. Smarodei Ton
6. Pekhachon
7. Tep Pra Rorp
8. Tep Rum Choul
9. Tevada P'tum
10. Tevada Nimitr
11. Srei Snom Bomrer
12. Soeng Thum Jorjoan
13. Sorser Pkay
14. Pkay Meas
15. Raksmei Pkay
16. Pkay Andet
17. Raksmei Chouk Chei
18. Ngiev Ph'laeng
19. Ponleu Pech
20. Many others.

== Significance ==
All kind of Pinpeat ensembles play significant role in Cambodian society and daily life since its origin.

The small Pinpeat ensemble is accompanied in various Cambodian national festivals, Buddhist celebrations, traditional dances, traditional drama, funeral, and other rituals.

While the big Pinpeat ensemble play more role and significance than the previous. These roles include:

- Accompanied in the congratulation for the troop march returned to the city defeated the enemies.
- Accompanied in the royal festivities such as Royal Boats Racing and Royal Plowing.
- Accompanied in Buddhist celebrations and rituals such as Pchhum Ben, Kathin, Bon Pkar, Bonchos Seima, and funerals.
- Accompanied in traditional dances Robam Jumpor (blessing dance), Robam Tep Monorum, Robam Apsara, Robam Sovan Maccha, and traditional dramas and shows such as Khol, Sbek Thum and Sbek Touch (shadow plays), Puppet Show, Reamker Drama. Sometimes this ensemble can be performed in other local rituals as well.

== See also ==
- Music of Cambodia
- Piphat
- Hsaing waing
