= Poeng mang =

Unpitched percussion instrument

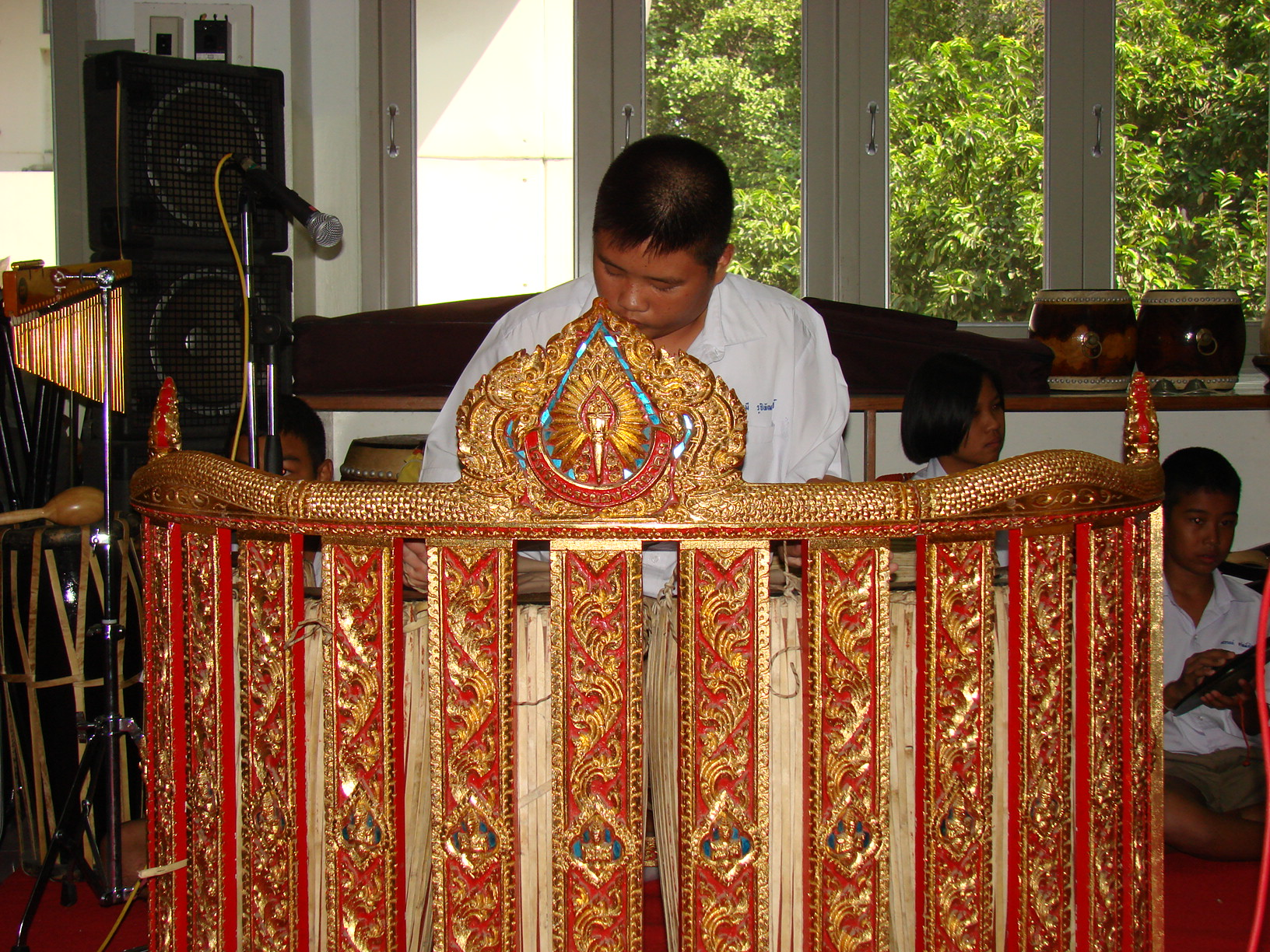
A student playing the poeng manog khok

The poeng mang, (Thai: เปิงมาง), known as poeng mang khok (เปิงมางคอก) when used as a set, is a traditional Thai drum of Mon origin and in Myanmar called Pat waing, played by Mon people . It is a percussion instrument, used to furnish the rhythms of music. They are set of leather faced drums which plays an important role in the piphat Mon ensemble. They are played to teasingly interrupt the rhythms with the Taphon mon adding a joyful mood to the music.

If used singly the drum is played with two hands only.

== Construction ==
The poeng mang khok is set of 7 poeng mang drums of graded sizes which are tuned to the desired pitches and tones by stretching the leather faces and applying a mixture of kneaded cooked rice and ash to the center of one face. The tuned drums are tied together and hung in order of pitches on a semi- circular wooden framework called khok poeng (about 60 centimeters high). The lowest pitch drum is hung on the furthest left and the highest pitch drum is hung on the furthest right.

== Uses ==
If using the set, the musician sits inside the khok poeng and uses his hands to beat the drums. Sometimes the elbows or head are used to present fantastic and joyful styles. If the single drum is used he holds both ends with his hands to play.

== See also ==
- Pat waing
