= Klong song na =

Type of barrel drum

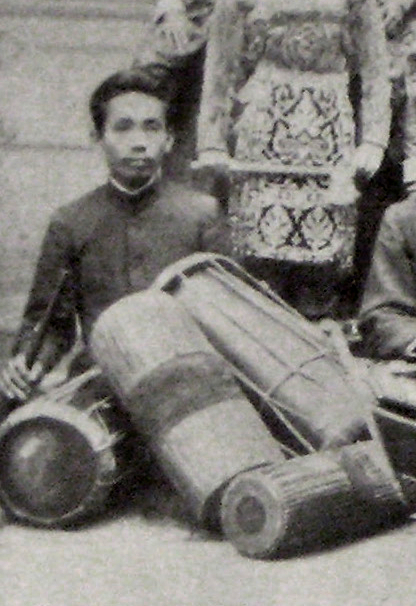
Center and bottom drums, Thailand klong song na drums, equivalent to Cambodian skor sang na drums. Far left and far right drums, Thai Klong khaek drums. Image taken Thailand about 1900 A.D.

Klong song na (Thai: กลองสองหน้า, pronounced [klɔːŋ sɔ̌ːŋ nâː] or [klɔːŋ sɔ̌ŋ nâː]) is a Thai barrel drum. Song na means "two faces", and the drum has two heads that are played with the hands. It is used primarily in the piphat ensemble.

== See also ==
- Traditional Thai musical instruments
- Klong khaek
