= Lao Duang Duean =

Classical Thai musical composition of Prince Benbadhanabongse

Lao Duang Duean (Thai: ลาวดวงเดือน, Thai pronunciation: [laːw duaŋ dɯan]) is the classical Thai musical composition of Prince Benbadhanabongse, son of King Rama V. It was composed in 1909 as the original title Lao Damnoen Kwian and was later changed to the new title Lao Duang Duean.

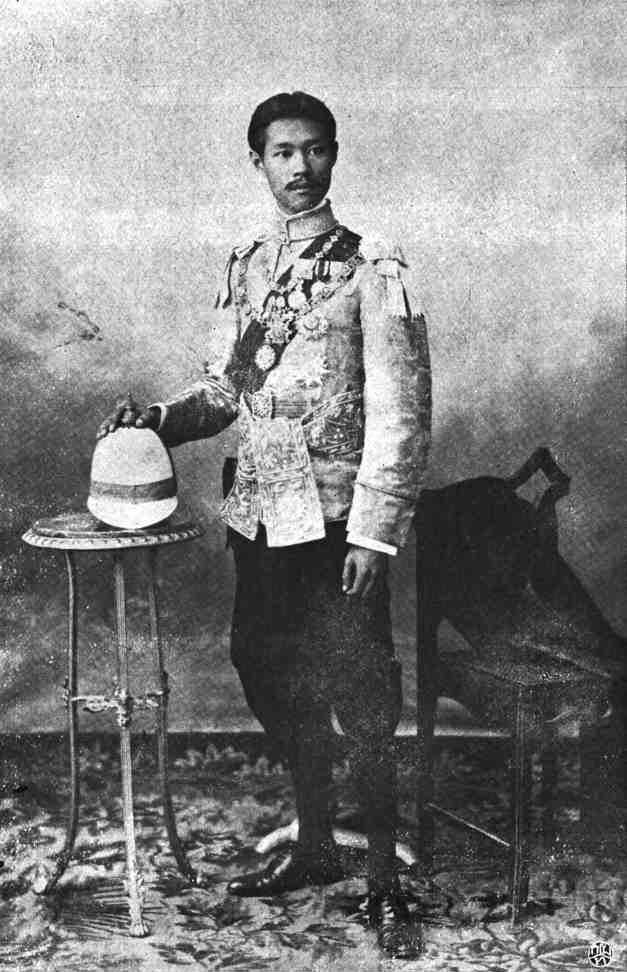
Prince Benbadhanabongse, the composer of Lao Duang Duean.

== Meaning ==
In Thai, Lao Duang Duean (original title: Lao Damnoen Kwian) means Moonlight Serenade or The Moon (in Lao accent), and the original title Damnoen Kwian means cart proceeding. The term Lao describes a Lao dialect of northeastern Thailand and Lan Na, and the term Duang Duean means the moon, which means praising the girl's beauty by comparing the face of a young girl to the full moon.

Due to misunderstandings, some Lao believe that all Thai compositions with the Lao accent and Lao identity, e.g., Lao Duang Duean, Lao Siang Thian, and Lao Charoen Si, are originally Lao melodies adapted by Thai composers. In fact, most Thai compositions with the Lao accent (samniang lao) were derived from the music of Lan Na (now Chiang Mai), which is called Lao Chiang and Lao Kao for northeastern Thailand (Isan) by the Siamese royal court during 1851–1925.

== History ==
In 1909, Prince Benbadhanabongse, the director general of the Department of Agriculture, composed a new song to emphasize the song Lao Damnoen Sai during his wanderings to the silk weaving factory in Ubon Ratchathani, Siam (now Thailand). He entitled the new song Lao Damnoen Kwian (Thai: ลาวดำเนินเกวียน) because he had to ride a cart (kwian) along certain routes. Luang Amnat Narongran (Phaithun Benyakul), a Thai noble in the Ministry of Defense, was the first person to sing the Lao Damnoen Kwian in the reign of King Rama V. Its melody and downbeat are similar to Antonín Dvořák’s Humorous Symphony No. 7 (1894).

Since the lyrics start and end with the Thai word Duang Duean, it is popular to call the new song title Duang Duean, which means the moon, instead of the original song title, Lao Damnoen Kwian, which was given by Prince Benbadhanabongse.

In the reign of King Prajadhipok, the Fine Arts Department of Thailand has adopted the Lao Duang Duean for Thai classical dance, called Fon Lao Duang Duean (Thai: ฟ้อนลาวดวงเดือน). The first performance was set in the audience hall; there were Siamese royal ladies and ladies-in-waiting performing the dance in front of his majesty. King Prajadhipok also refines the Fon Lao Duang Duean by adding a rhythm and had Thanpuying Puangroi Apaiwong play the piano to accompany the performance.

In the reign of King Bhumibol Adulyadej, the song Lao Duang Duean was revamped for the Thai dance, Fon Duang Duean, by the Fine Arts Department of Thailand; the performance was led and sang by Montri Tramote, and its dance movements were created by Paew Snidvongseni, to honor his majesty and Queen Sirikit on the occasion of the state visit.

In 1962, Queen Ingrid of Sweden and King Frederik IX of Denmark had visited Thailand. There is a record in His Majesty's Footsteps: A Personal Memoir, said that Queen Ingrid watched the performance of the crown prince of Thailand (now King Vajiralongkorn) singing the thai classical music Lao Duang Duean:–

Queen Ingrid might have been surprised to see the crown prince sing the famous traditional Thai song ‘Lao Duang Duean’ and to hear Princess Sirindhorn play a Thai fiddle and sing traditional Thai songs as well.

The dance Fon Duang Duean was later performed many times, such as,

- On the occasion of the state visit of Prince Friedrich Wilhelm Prinz von Preußen of the Federal Republic of Germany at Sivalai Garden in the Grand Palace of Thailand on October 10, 1963.
- On the occasion of a state visit for Prince Masahito, and Princess Hanako, Prince and Princess Hitachi of Japan, in the Dusit Palace Thailand on December 1, 1965.
- On the occasion of hosting a royal dinner for a state visit at the Boromphiman Throne Hall in the Grand Palace Thailand on March 9, 1966.

Since the lyrics of this song are a lamentation of the love between a young man and a young woman, the newly invented Fon Duang Duean dance shows beautiful courting gestures in the style of Thai dance.

== In popular cultures ==
Lao Duang Duean appears in various contemporary cultures and media as follows:

=== Drama and movie ===
- Four Reigns (2004 Thai drama)
- E Riam Sing (Riam Fighting Angel) (2020) (Sang by Ranee Campen).
- Eternity (2010 Thai film).
- Under The Same Moon (2021 Thai MV), (chorus by Perawat Sangpotirat, Prachaya Ruangroj, and Ada Chunhavajira).
- Roi Duriyang; The Musical (2015 Thai stage play at the Thailand Cultural Centre).

=== Computer Program ===
- Loa Duang (Aliases: Lao Duang). The Loa Duang, also known as the Lao Duang Duean virus, is a type of computer virus that was discovered in May 1991 in Thailand. The virus caused the system boot sector and directory corruption and decreased computer memory.

=== Video Games ===
- Civilization V. Appears as the great work of Prince Benbadhanabongse, who appears as a Great Musician in the game.
