= Klong khaek =

Type of barrel drum

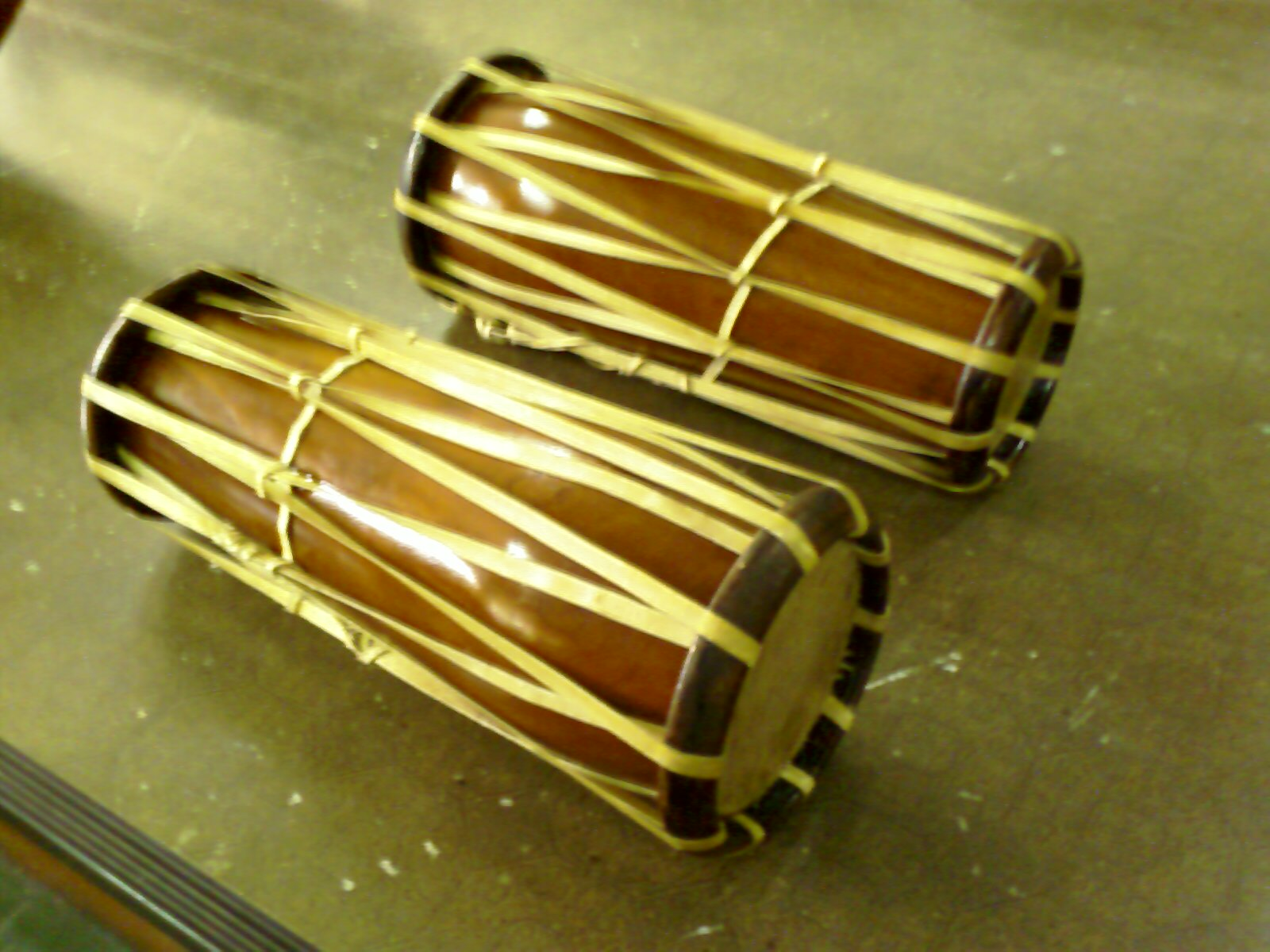
- A pair of klong khaek
- Classification: Percussion (Membranophone)

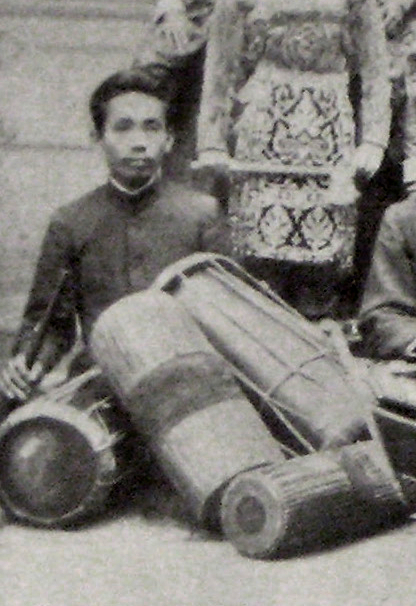
Center and bottom drums, Thailand klong song na drums, equivalent to Cambodian skor sang na drums. Far left and far right drums, Thai Klong khaek drums. Image taken Thailand about 1900 A.D.

Klong khaek (Thai: กลองแขก, pronounced [klɔːŋ kʰɛ̀ːk]) is a type of double-headed barrel drum used in Thai music. The term literally means "Indian drum" from the words klong (กลอง) meaning drum and Khaek (แขก) meaning Indian or Tamil. Looks the same as the Klong malayu; those are shorter and heavier.

There are two types of klong khaek: klong khaek tua phu (Thai: กลองแขกตัวผู้) which is considered to be male, and klong khaek tua mia (Thai: กลองแขกตัวเมีย) regarded as female. They are always played in a pair, usually by two players, although if two players are not available a single player may play both drums. The two drums fit their beats together in hocket, or interlocking form.

Both drumheads are played with the hands, like the klong songna. The klong khaek tua phu has a higher pitch and the klong khaek tua mia has a lower pitch.

== See also ==
- Traditional Thai musical instruments
- Klong song na
