= Taphon =

Traditional Thai drum

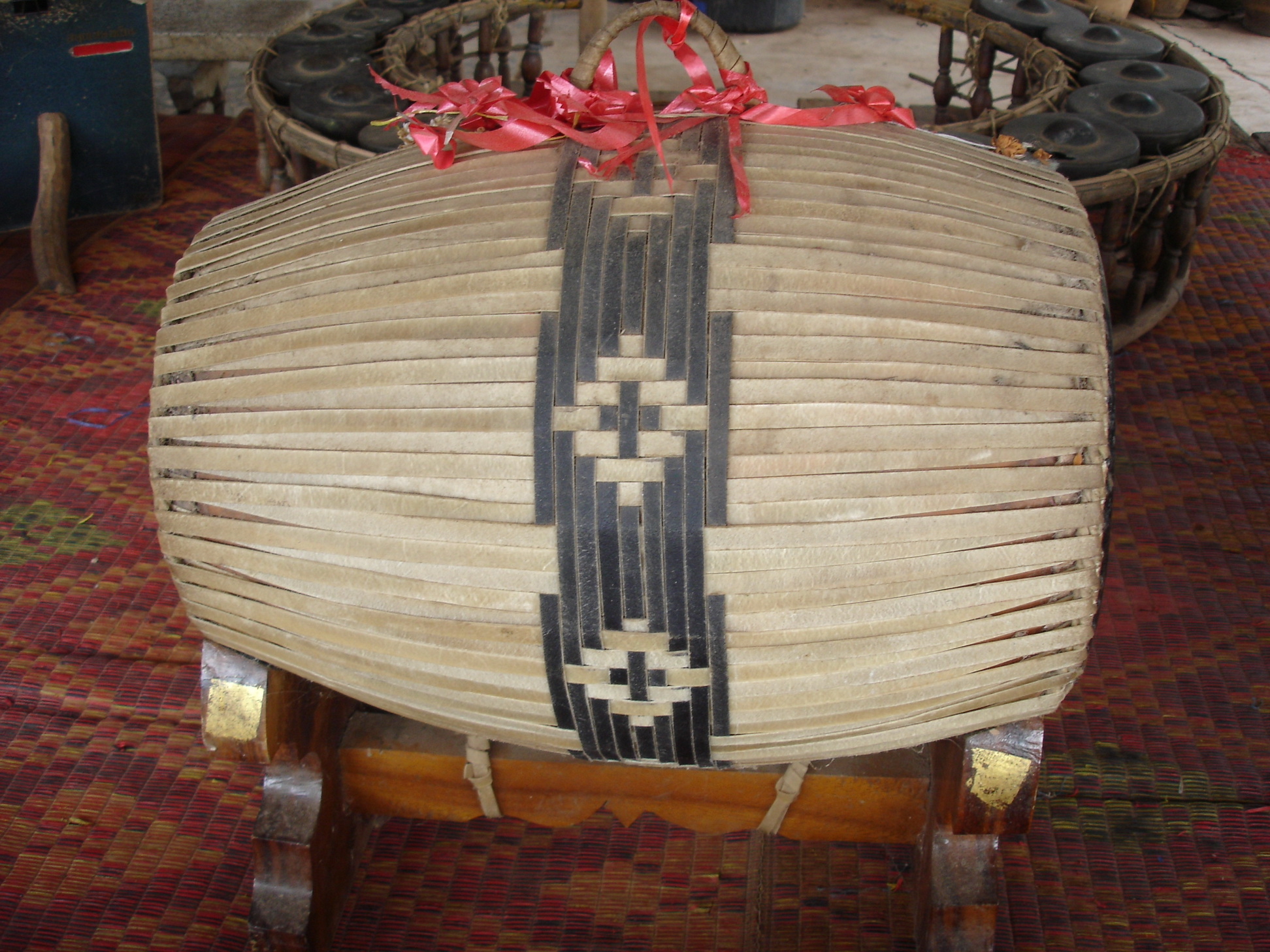
taphon

The taphon (Thai: ตะโพน, pronounced [ta.pʰoːn]) is a traditional drum of Thailand. It is barrel-shaped with two heads, and is played by the hands and fingers of hands, much like the more popular congas.

Originally called the Sa Phon, the taphon is used in the classical Thai wind-and-percussion ensemble called piphat. Moreover, it is the most commonly used drum in Thai folk music, and is performed often in Bangkok and Chiang Mai. Often used to accompany performances in Thai shrines which are meant to entertain the resident god in offering, it is considered a particularly sacred instrument in the Thai culture, and is generally kept in a higher place than other instruments. In many cases, designs are woven into the middle section of the taphon.

The taphon is very similar to the Cambodian sampho.

An example of the taphon being played:

== Material and Construction ==
The taphon is traditionally made from hardwood, such as teak or rosewood. The heads are made from animal skin, typically from cowhide or buffalo hide. The taphon is constructed by hollowing out a log of wood and then attaching the heads. The heads are held in place by ropes or hoops made from rattan or bamboo.

== See also ==
- Piphat
- Music of Thailand
- Sampho
- Congas
