= Ranat ek lek =

Type of metallaphone

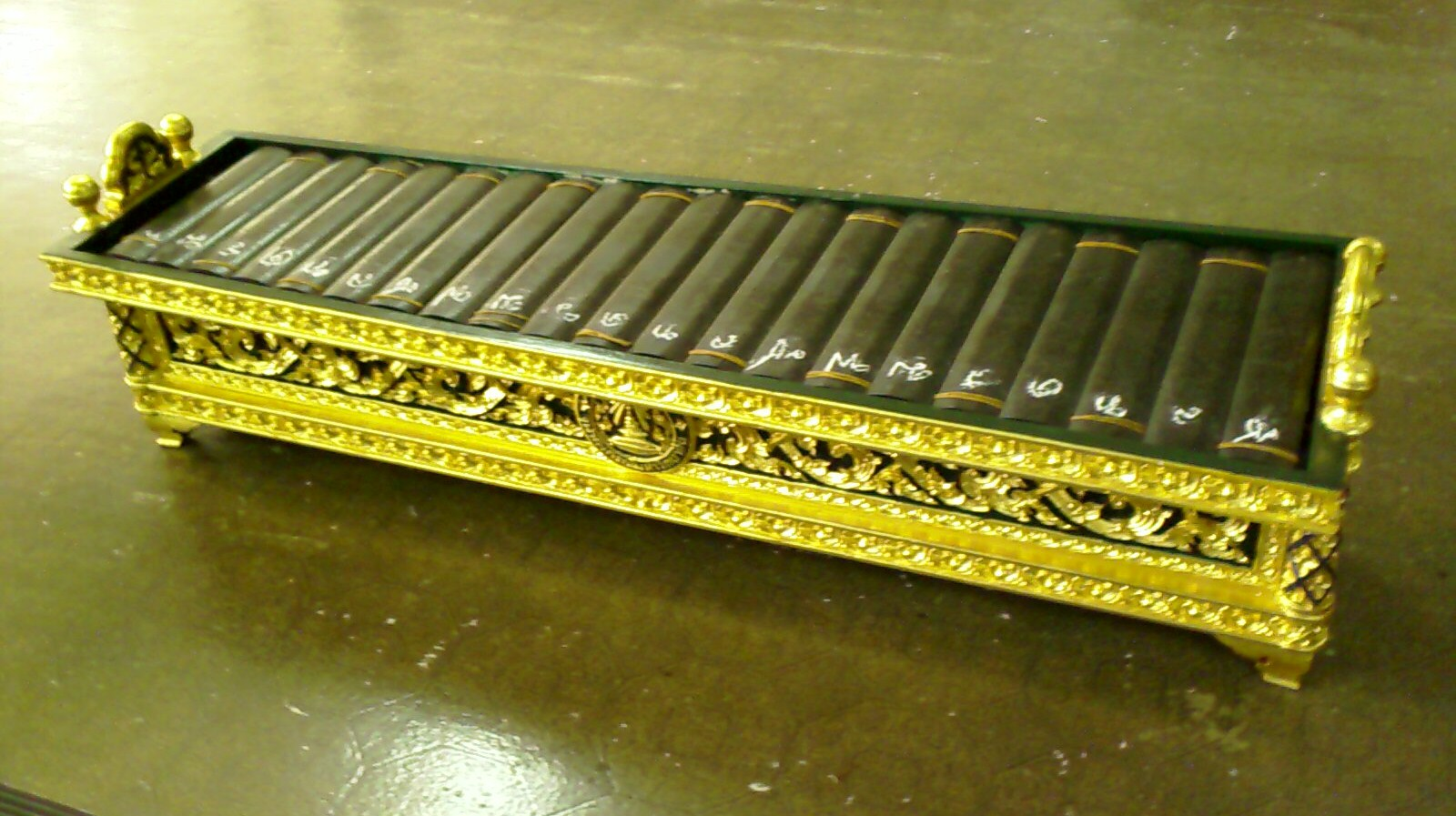
- Classification: Percussion (metallophone)

Related instruments
- Roneat dek, ranat ek, ranat thum lek

The ranat ek lek (Thai: ระนาดเอกเหล็ก, pronounced [ranâːt ʔèːk lèk]) is a metallophone used in the classical music of Thailand. It is the smaller of the two sizes of Thai metallophone; the larger one is called ranat thum lek.

This musical instrument was originated in the reign of King Rama IV (1854-1868).

The ranat ek lek consists of flat metal slabs placed over a rectangular wooden resonator. It is played with two bamboo sticks with padded ends.

The ranat ek lek is very similar to the Khmer roneat dek.

== See also ==
- ranat (musical instrument)
