= Ranat kaeo =

The ranat kaeo (Thai: ระนาดแก้ว, pronounced [ranâːt kɛ̂ːw]) is a crystallophone consisting of struck glass bars of varying length, used in the classical music of Thailand. It is usually played with a soft padded mallet.

== Related instruments ==
- Xylophone: an array of wooden bars of various lengths, struck. Greek for "wood sound"; "xylo" is Greek for "wood" and "phone" is Greek for "sound"
- Lithophone: an array of rocks... "litho" is Greek for "rock".
- Pagophone: an array of ice bars... "pago" is Greek for "ice".
