= Ranat thum =

Type of xylophone

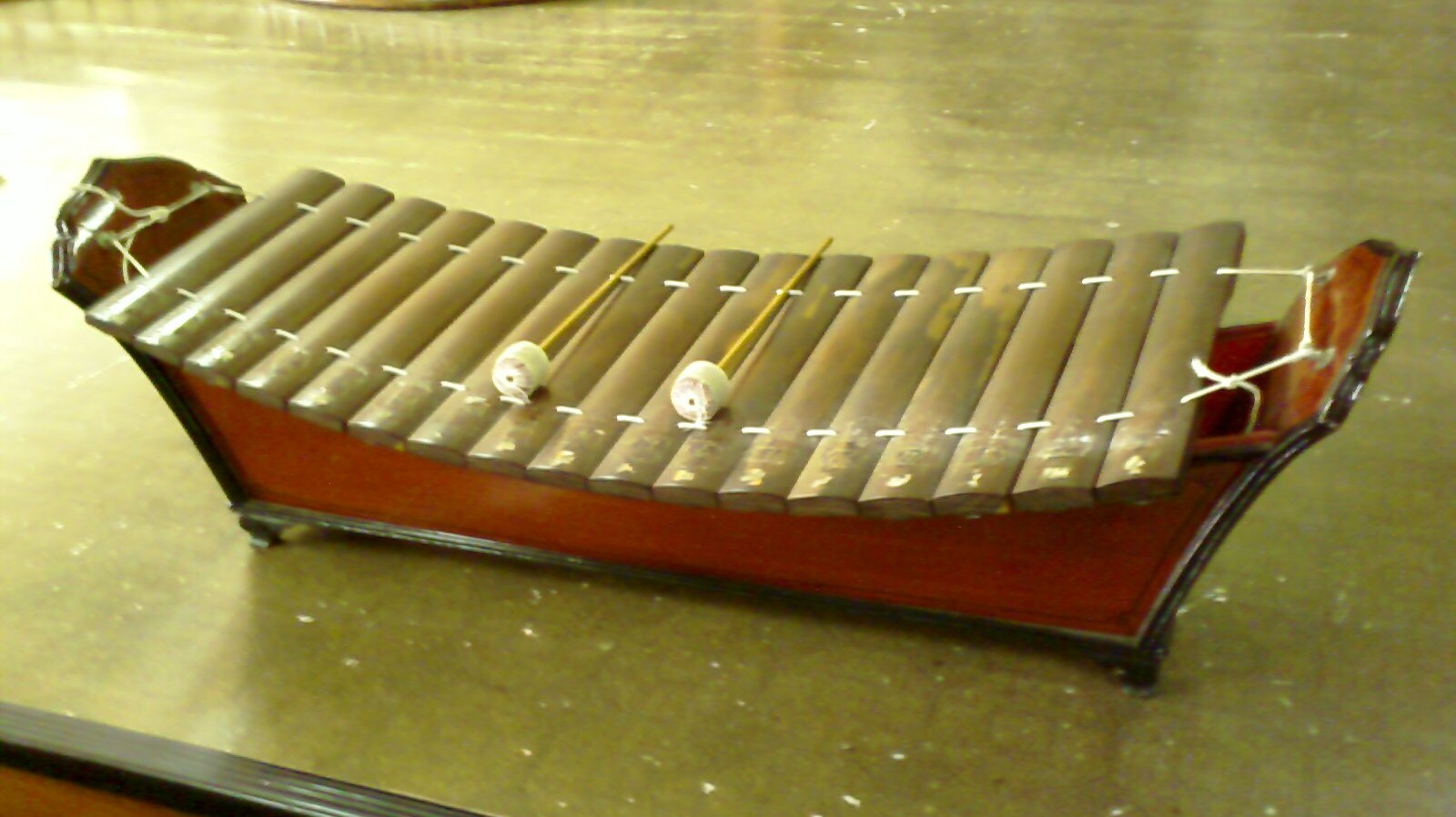
- Classification: Percussion (idiophone)

Related instruments
- Roneat thung, ranat thum lek, ranat ek

The ranat thum (Thai: ระนาดทุ้ม, pronounced [ranâːt tʰúm]) is a low pitched xylophone belongs to the pitched percussion part in the traditional music of Thailand, given that the word "ทุ้ม (Thum)" means lower pitch. It has 17 wooden bars, which are stretched over a boat-shaped trough resonator. Its shape looks like a ranat ek, but it is lower and wider. It is usually played in accompaniment of a ranat ek in ensembles like several Piphat formations or Mahori, usually with a more gleeful, amusing pattern to support the main melody of ranat ek.

ranat thum bars are typically made from bamboo, although instruments with rosewood (Dalbergia oliveri; Thai: ไม้ชิงชัน; mai ching chan) bars can also be found, though instrument makers say bars made from bamboo sound better and can be heard more clearly when played in an ensemble.

Regardless of ranat thum being a part of both Mahori band and Piphat band, the instrument in Mahori band is specifically smaller in size and higher in pitch to soften the sound and harmonize it with other instruments in an ensemble. Another similar instrument is ranat thum lek, ranat thum with metal bars, with soft and echoing tones.

It is similar to a Cambodian xylophone called roneat thung.

== History ==
Ranat thum is a Thai musical instrument made of bamboo catagorized as percussion. Despite the fact that information of the exact year when Ranat thum was first created is yet to be found, it is stated that the instrument was created after the invention of the ranat ek, which was in 1826, during the reign of King Rama III. At that time, there was an attempt to create more instruments to add more layers to the Piphat ensemble, hence the ranat thum and Khong wong lek being invented.

Although the ranat thum was created to mimic the traits of ranat ek, its pitch is much lower since the purpose of this instrument is to enhance the overall sound of an ensemble. Unlike ranat ek which usually uses perfect octave in its melody, ranat thum is more mischevioius since the melody may have various notes between two hands, sometimes even requiring a crossed arm, and it may have more flare rather than stick to a set pattern.

== Construction ==
Ranat thum consists of 17 bars made of bamboo, strung together using a cord that connects through all of them.The bars are then suspended on hooks at curved edges on the both sides of its long, rectangular shaped box, which is 124 cm. in length and 22 cm. in width. At the bottom of the body, each corner consists of a small, wooden base for a support. It is different from ranat ek’s body, which resembles the shape of a wooden boat and consists of a pedestal that supports the whole body. To perform the instrument, the player holds a pair of mallets wrapped in fabrics and strikes down the bars. The wooden bars are longer and wider in size, causing its pitch to be lower to accompany ranat ek and other instruments in an ensemble.

To make the set of bars on the ranat thum, bamboo is harvested at around 5 years of age as that is when it is at a suitable hardness for durability. For this instrument, the bamboo needs to be at around 8 inches in diameter and will be cut lengthwise into 4-5 sections. They are then soaked in water for 3 months and taken out to dry for 6 months.

Once the sections are completely dry, the artisan chooses 17 sections of bamboo with increasing thickness that have both sides of the node still attached and a smooth surface with no cracks. Then, by tapping on the bamboo and listening to the sound, the most suitable pieces are selected.

The chosen bars are then trimmed down to the appropriate length and width using a blade and wood planer. The holes for the string are drilled into each of the bars which is then tuned with a lead mixture underneath and assembled into a set of bars to be hung over the main body.

== Shape ==
The ranat thum’s wooden base is in a narrow rectangular box shape with note bars that are wider and larger to help amplify the bass which is different from its ranat ek counterpart which has a more boat-like shape with smaller bars.

== Usage ==
Ranat thum is considered a crucial part as the harmonizing instrument which is why it is included in many ensemble arrangements and often played during different traditional performances.

In traditional Thai Khon, a Piphat ensemble, which includes ranat thum, accompanies the stage performance and opening overture. The amount of instruments in the ensemble depends on the type of Khon being performed.

Apart from Piphat, the Mahori ensemble which is a mixture of Piphat and Thai string ensemble. The ranat thum in a Mahori ensemble is smaller than the standard size with a different pitch to better blend with string instruments.

== Tuning ==
For tuning, the most commonly used substance is a mixture of lead and beeswax melted together which can be molded to the underside of the bars when heated up depending on if the note needs to be lower or higher. The more lead mixture there is under the bar, the lower the pitch becomes and if the note needs to go higher, the lead can be heated then scraped off. Over time, some lead pieces may fall off from the bars which will make the instrument off-tune. A quick solution is heating the piece back up with a hair dryer and sticking it back on to the bar.

The Ranat Thum’s musical scale doesn’t use the Standard musical scales like C,D,E but divides an octave equally into 7 notes. The Ranat Ek and Ranat Thum both use the same scale system though the Ranat Thum is tuned an octave lower than Ranat Ek.
