= Samphor =

Small, 2-headed barrel drum indigenous to Cambodia

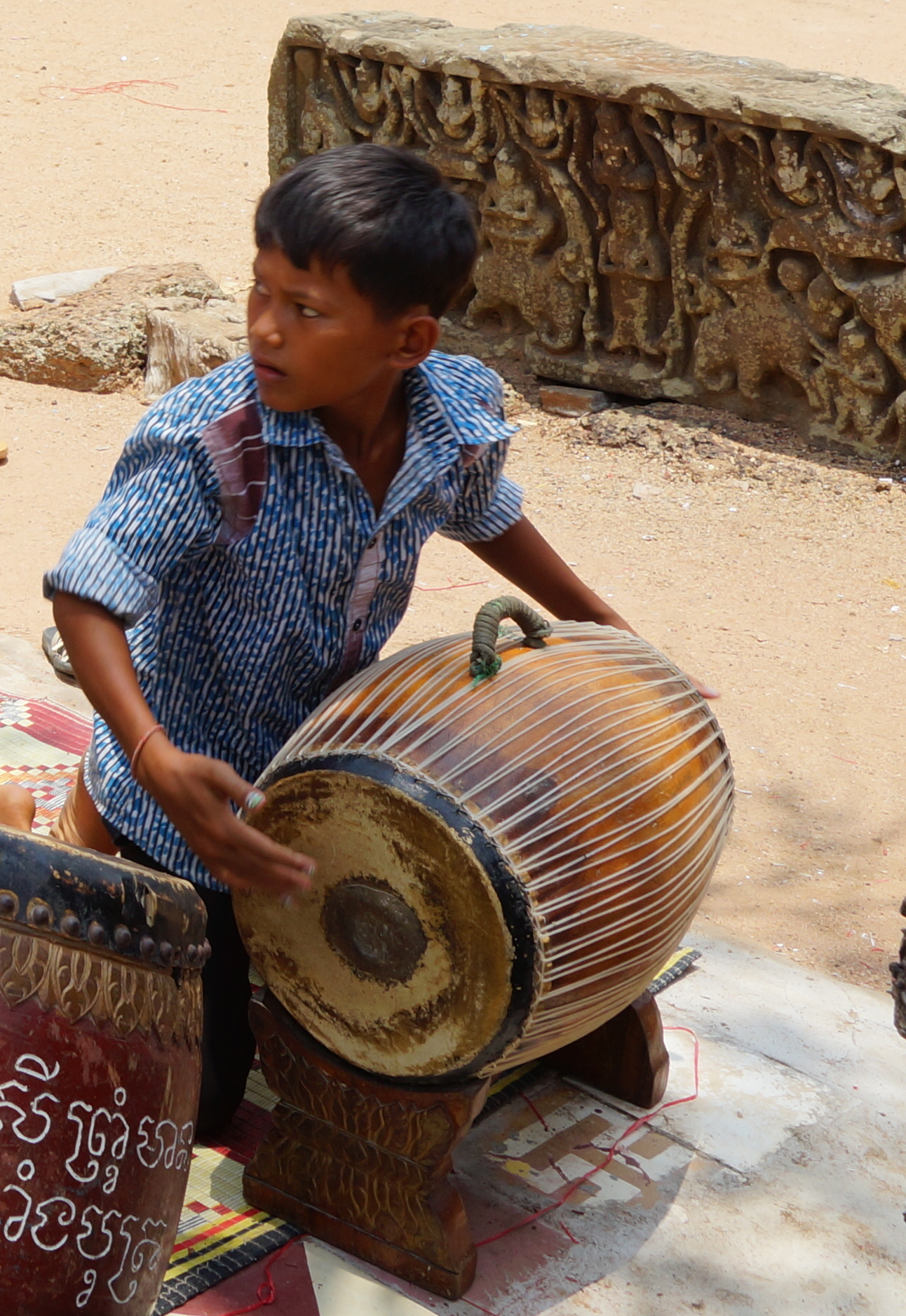
A Cambodian boy plays a samphor (Khmer:សំភោរ).

The samphor (Khmer: សំភោរ; also romanized as sampho) is a small, 2-headed barrel drum indigenous to Cambodia, approximately .35 meter wide by .5 meter long. It has two heads, with one drumhead being larger than the other and is played with both hands. Depending on the ability of the musician, the samphor can make as many as 8 different pitches. The player of the sampho leads the pinpeat (a classical ensemble of wind and percussion instruments), setting the tempo and beat. It is also played at freestyle boxing evens, accompanying the sralai. The samphor is analogous to the taphon used in Thailand.

The samphor is made by hollowing out a single block of wood into a barrel shape. Both ends are covered with calfskin, tightened by strips of leather or rattan. One head of the drum is larger than the other to allow differing tones. Traditionally, the maker "tunes" each head by applying a circle of paste made of rice and ashes (from a palm); however a new resin paste is available today. The pitch to which the skin head is tuned becomes lower with a thicker layer of ash.

The drummer makes use of four distinct strokes: an open and closed stroke for each head. Each of these four sounds has a Cambodian name:

Open stroke, small head (ting)
Closed stroke, small head (tip)
Open stroke, large head (theung)
Closed stroke, large head (tup)

== See also ==
- Music of Cambodia
- Kendang
