= Ranat thum lek =

Musical instrument

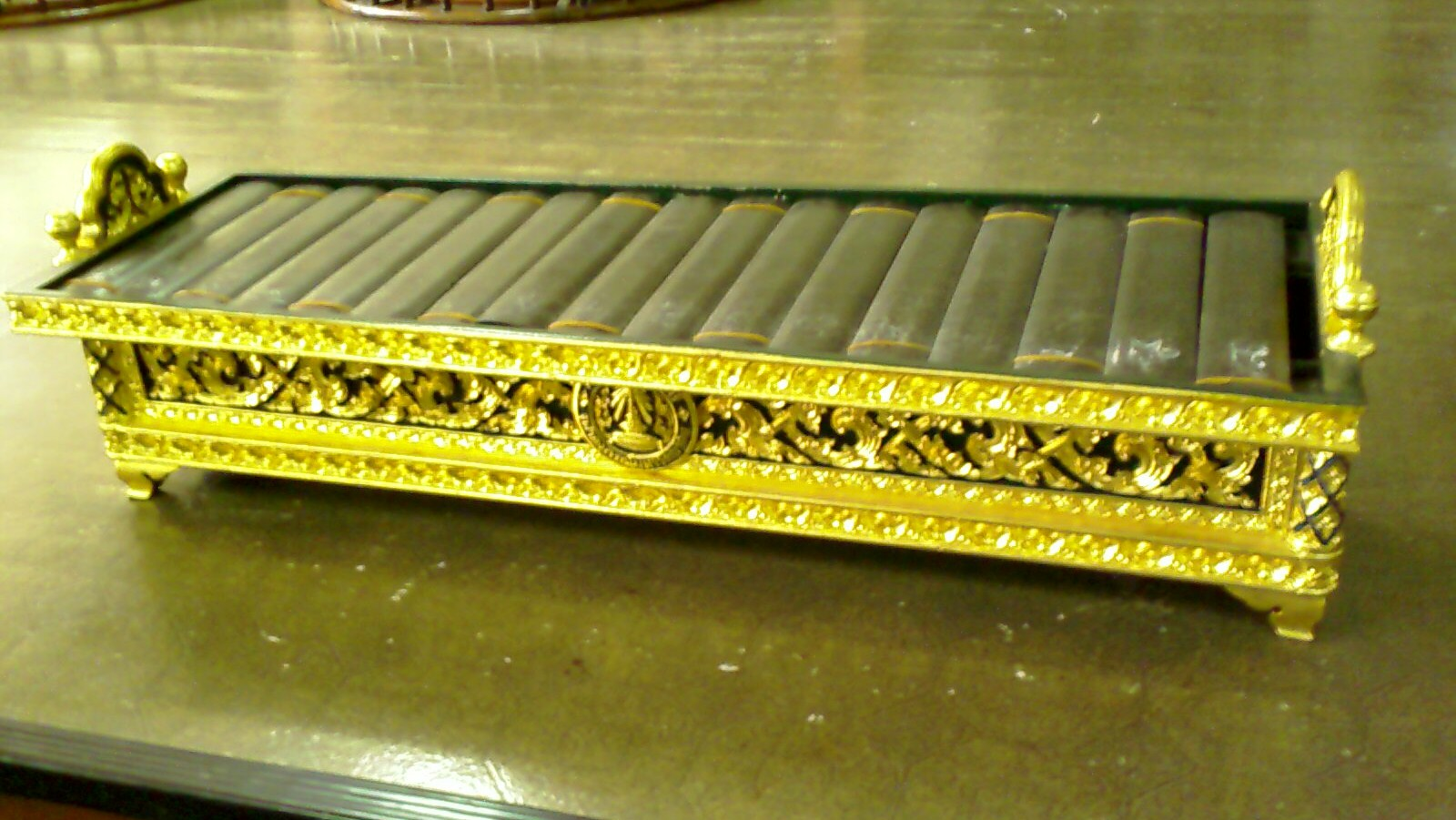
- Classification: Percussion (idiophone)

Related instruments
- Roneat thong, ranat thum, ranat ek lek

The ranat thum lek (Thai: ระนาดทุ้มเหล็ก, pronounced [ranâːt tʰúm lèk]) is a metallophone used in the classical music of Thailand. It is the larger of the two sizes of Thai metallophones; the smaller one is called ranat ek lek.

The ranat thum lek consists of flat metal slabs placed over a rectangular wooden resonator. It is played with two bamboo sticks with padded ends.

The origin of this instrument is attributed to the brother of King Rama IV (1854–1868) the same time as the creation of roneat ek lek.

The ranat thum lek is very similar to the Khmer roneat thong.
