= Krachappi =

Plucked, fretted lute of Thailand

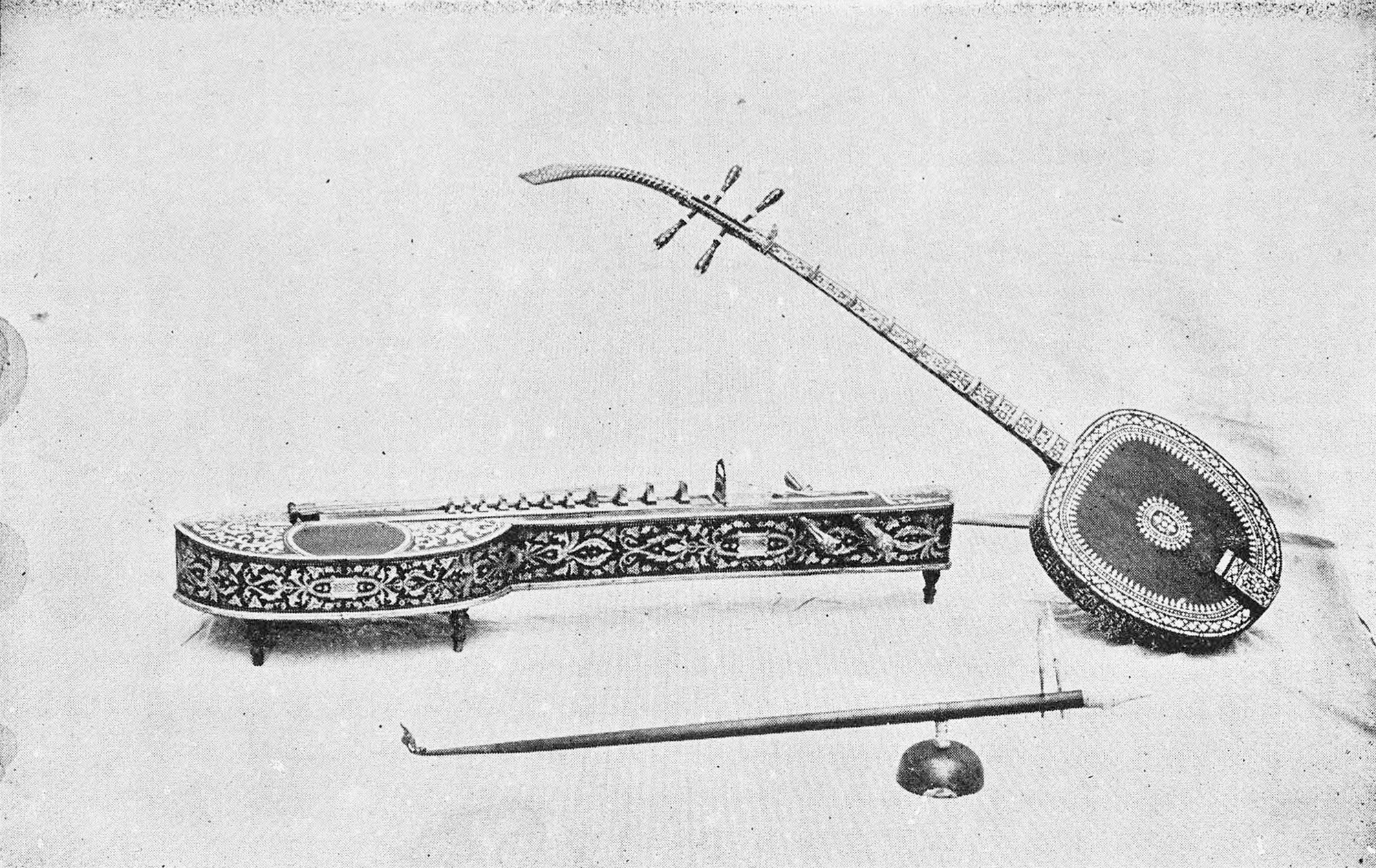
The image, taken in 1929, shows three traditional Thai musical instruments commonly used in Thai classical music ensembles: the chakhe, phin namtao, and krachappi.

The krachappi (Thai: กระจับปี่, pronounced [kra.tɕàp.pìː]), also spelled grajabpi, is plucked, fretted lute of Thailand, used in central Thai classical music. It has four strings in two courses that are plucked with a plectrum and are constructed of teak or jackfruit wood. It can be played by holding the wand, which is composed of thin wooden planks, in your right hand and flicking the wires in and out while pressing the string with your left finger. Krachappi usually plays in a band called Mahori with four to eight instruments.

The Department of Cultural Promotion listed the krachappi as a cultural heritage in 2011. The krachappi is an ancient Thai instrument and has been with the Thai people for over a century. The appearance, playing method, and song of krachappi are all associated with Thai history. Thai music instruments are divided into 4 groups, namely, strum, string, percussion, and brass.

The origin of the krachappi is ambiguous since there is a lack of evidence. However, there are assumptions from an ethnomusicologist that it was created by Thai people or neighboring countries. The origin of the music instrument was presumed to come from the east since they found a similar musical instrument called Kacchapi in India and has been presented multiple times in Jainism literature. Moreover, the instrument named Kacchapi appeared in many Indian literatures, for instance, the painting of Saraswati the Hindu goddess carries Kacchapi which was found in 200 B.C. Although the krachappi is no longer as prominent in high society, the phin and sueng continue to play a significant role in daily life.

The Cambodian counterpart is called the chapei dang veng or chapei.

== History ==
The krachappi is a Thai string instrument with a flat body and curved fretboard which is not well known but has a long history with Thai people. The Royal Institute Dictionary of 1982 defined the krachappi as a four-stringed phin and its name originated from Kacchapa, which means turtle in Sanskrit. The definition of Kacchapa is the reason it was called Kacchapa because its body resembles a turtle's shell. Moreover, Prince Damrong Rajanubhab also mentioned in the chronicle about the krachappi that it was called khsajapi or cachejapei in Cambodia.

There is plenty of evidence that indicates the popularity of the krachappi through Thai culture and history from Ayutthaya to the beginning of Rattanakosin. The krachappi was usually played with many instruments in Mahori which consisted of three to ten instruments. The evidence is separated into two forms which are written and unwritten evidence.

The most important written evidence is the Siamese Musical Instruments book, written by Prince Damrong Rajanubhab, which is about the changing of Mahori. The book has great details of instruments that were added and eliminated to Mahori, so it contains plenty of information about the krachappi. It indicates the importance of the krachappi to the Mahori as well as the time that the krachappi was eliminated from the Mahori. The book mentioned that the Mahori in the Ayutthaya era originally had four instruments including Saw, Krachappi, Thone, and Krap. Afterward, the number of instruments was added to the Mahori until the beginning of Rattanakosin. There are numerous changes in the Mahori in Rattanakosin since only the functional and best-quality instruments will be selected. In the era of King Rama V of Siam, the krachappi was eliminated from the Mahori. The concrete written evidence that indicates that the krachappi existed in the Ayutthaya era is from the first Thai textbook named Jindamanee. On page 45 of Jindamanee book there is a poem about five instruments in the Mahori and Krachappi is included. Moreover, there is a journal that records the situation during the year 1448 to 1488. The royal rule of Borommatrailokkanat, the king of Ayutthaya, did not allow the krachappi as well as other Thai instruments to be played in the palace.

There is plenty of unwritten evidence of the krachappi which are paintings, murals, and sculptures. The first one is the mural in the Ayutthaya era of the Lord Buddha's life that appears krachappi in it; the mural is currently located at The Suan Pakkad Palace. The second one is the painting in Phra Phutthayotfa Chulalok Maharaj era located in the west of Phutthaisawan Hall. It is a picture of six instruments in the Mahori. The third one is a carved wooden door of the Mahori which includes four instruments, namely, Saw, Krachappi, Thone, and Krap.

Considering all of the evidence, it indicates that the number of instruments has been adjusting due to the development of technology. When the new instrument had created, the previous one which may have a lot of disadvantages must be eliminated. At the beginning of Rattanakosin, there are many instruments that have been created which make the krachappi, a heavy instrument that has a light sound, replaced by a Zither. Although zither is more convenient and has a louder sound, the krachappi is not completely gone from Thai culture.

== Construction ==
=== Body ===
The body of the krachappi was made of hardwood, for instance, teak, jackfruit, Sandalwood, and Siamese rosewood. The front is flat, but the back of the body is curved.

=== Neck ===
The neck is curved and there are four holes for the tuning keys—two holes for each side. The four strings are tied to the tuning keys.

=== Tuning key ===
There are four tuning pegs in one krachappi and it was made of bone or ivory.

=== Head ===
It was made of hardwood, bone, or ivory. There is a hole in the middle to let the string pass across it.

=== Frets ===
The frets were made of small wood of about 11-12 pieces. It will be located on the fretboard and its function is to make the sound lower or higher.

=== Nut ===
A flat wood at the neck of krachappi. The functionality of the nut is to prevent the string from attaching to the fret.

=== String ===
The nylon string or wire

=== Pick ===
There are two types of pick but both were used to play krachappi. First is a thin wood or animal bone in leaf shape. Second one is a short and fat wood in pen shape.

== Tuning and technique ==
=== Technique ===
The posture while playing the krachappi is squatting or cross-legged and placing the krachappi on the lap since placing the tip of the body into the lap will make it more convenient to play. Then release the head to the left hand at an angle of 45 degrees. The right-hand holds a pick to flick back and forth to create a sound by switching up and down according to the rhythm and melody of the song. The method of using a zigzag style pick is to place a pick between your index finger and middle finger and pull all your fingers down. The direction of a pick will be controlled by the thumb.

There are eight strumming method which is the same method as the zither, as follows:

- Keep strum is a method of using pick to strum out and in according to the melody of a song.
- Rubbing is a style of strumming in-out-in, alternating as often as possible, with the longest length of the sound or melody continually.
- Flicking is to strum one more rhythm, the normal strum, 2 rhythms, totaling 3 rhythms, using the strum in-out-in style, which can be divided into 3 types: flick up, flick down and flick.
- Confinement is similar to flicking, but the beginning and ending sound will be the same.
- Crushing is the act of adding a note or melody to a normal keep strum method.
- Synchronization is to strum both lines simultaneously resulting in a harmonious sound.
- Slap is a type of strum that produces two tones by flicking with a bare string or by pressing your finger on the string once and pressing your finger on the string with a higher sound.
- Scattering is the strum of three sounds in succession in a manner similar to the sobbing of a chorus.

The role of a left hand side is to hold the krachappi neck and play the chord. The technique of playing chords is to use the left hand to loosely support the ratchet's bow to allow the gap of the finger groove between the thumb and forefinger. The use of the finger of the krachappi is depending on the ease of the player, in other words, the player could use the index finger, middle finger, ring finger or little finger to press the string.

=== Tuning ===
There is no specific pattern in the sound setting of the krachappi. Usually it depends on the player to have the aptitude and preference of the player. There are three popular ways to set the tone of the krachappi, which are:

1. The inner pair sets the sound of the Do, the outer line pairs the sound of the Sal.
2. The inner pair sets the sound of the Re, the outer line pairs the sound of the Sal.
3. The inner pair sets the sound of the Sal, the outer line pairs the sound of the Do.

== The Mahori ==
The krachappi is a musical instrument used to play in the ancient Mahori. This type of Mahori has a soft, melodious sound like the heavenly sounds because of its moderate volume and a low accent. It is suitable for use in various royal ceremonies. The krachappi is heavy and has a light sound; therefore, it will be covered up by the sound of other instruments.

Nowadays, the krachappi is hardly seen as it is very difficult to find a person who plays the krachappi. The krachappi is one of the important Thai musical instruments that needs to be preserved and should be used and developed continuously so that it does not disappear from Thai society. Therefore, there is a chance to see a krachabpi playing with the ancient Mahori on special occasions. The bands that will have the opportunity to see Krachappi join in the performance are as follows:

1. The Mahori quartet included a singer who also played the Krap-puang, Saw-sam-sai, Krachappi and Thon.
2. The Mahori sextet consisted of six performers included; Saw-sam-sai, Krachappi, Thaband, krap-phuang, Khlui, and Pi-chennai. During the early Ayutthaya period, this ensemble first appeared.
3. The Mahori septet was added to the existing ensemble and consists of Saw-sam-sai, Krachappi, Thon, Krab-phuang, Khlui, Ranat, Ranat kaeo and Ramana.

== 21st Century ==
The krachappi began to disappear from the Thai music society after the beginning of Rattanakosin. Nowadays, you can hardly find a krachappi player and broadcaster for strumming. Although the krachappi is not very popular, there is still a group of people who are interested in playing the krachappi. There are some groups of people who want to preserve the krachappi on the Internet and it is considered as a good sign that the krachappi has not completely disappeared from the Thai people's attention. Thai youth and people who love and are interested in the krachappi and details can be found at www.pantown.com.

== See also ==
- Traditional Thai musical instruments
- Chapei dong veng
