= Traditional Thai musical instruments =

Traditional Thai musical instruments (Thai: เครื่องดนตรีไทย, RTGS: Khrueang Dontri Thai) are the musical instruments used in the traditional and classical music of Thailand. They comprise a wide range of wind, string, and percussion instruments played by both the Thai majority as well as the nation's ethnic minorities.

In the traditional Thai system of organology, they are classified into four categories, by the action used in playing:

1. Plucking (plucked string instruments; เครื่องดีด, khrueang dit)
2. Bowing (bowed string instruments; เครื่องสี, khrueang si)
3. Striking (percussion instruments and hammered dulcimer; เครื่องตี, khrueang ti)
4. Blowing (wind instruments; เครื่องเป่า, khrueang pao)

Traditional Thai musical instruments also are classified into four categories, by the region of Thailand in which they are used.

== String ==
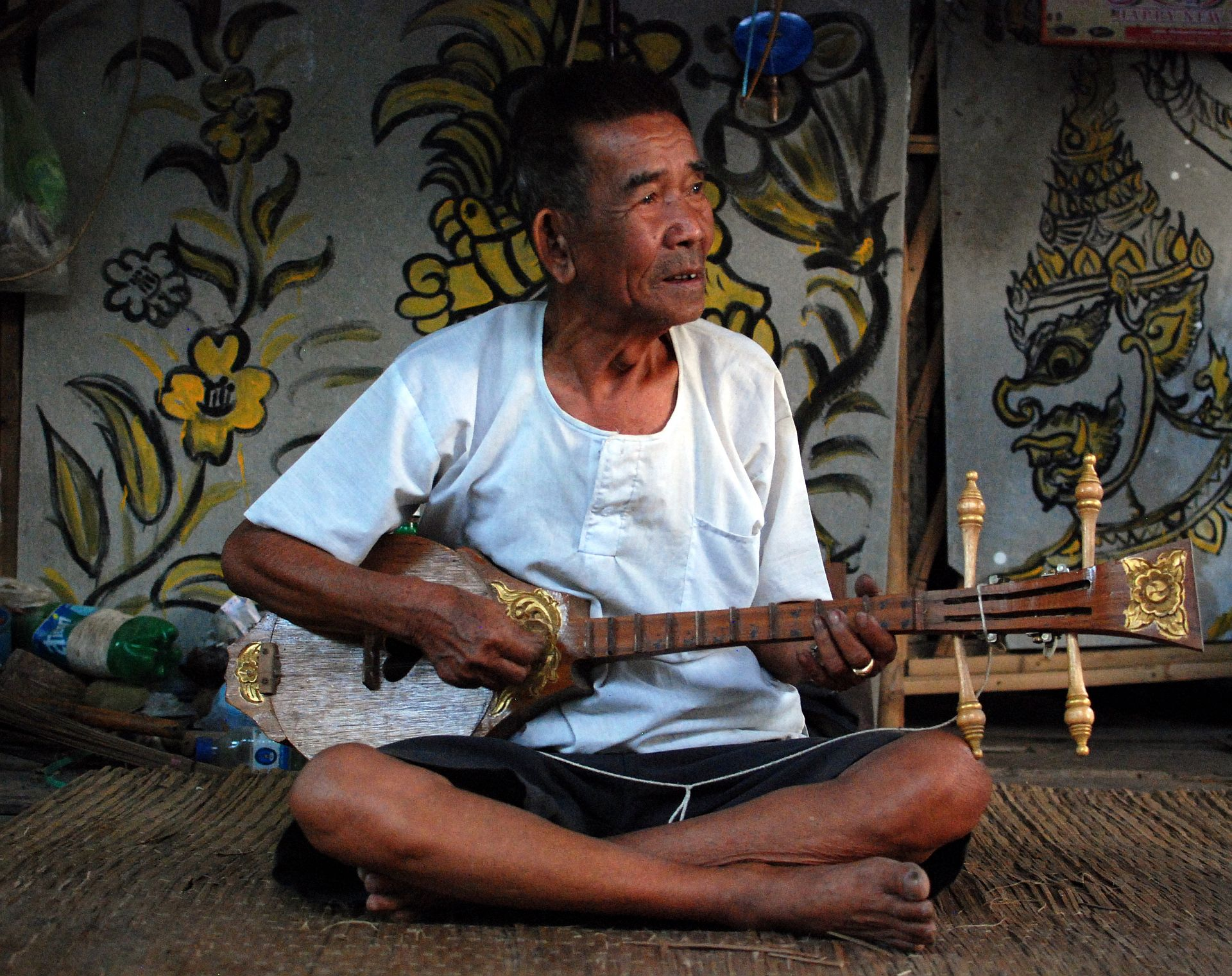
A music teacher in Mae On, near Chiang Mai, playing a sueng

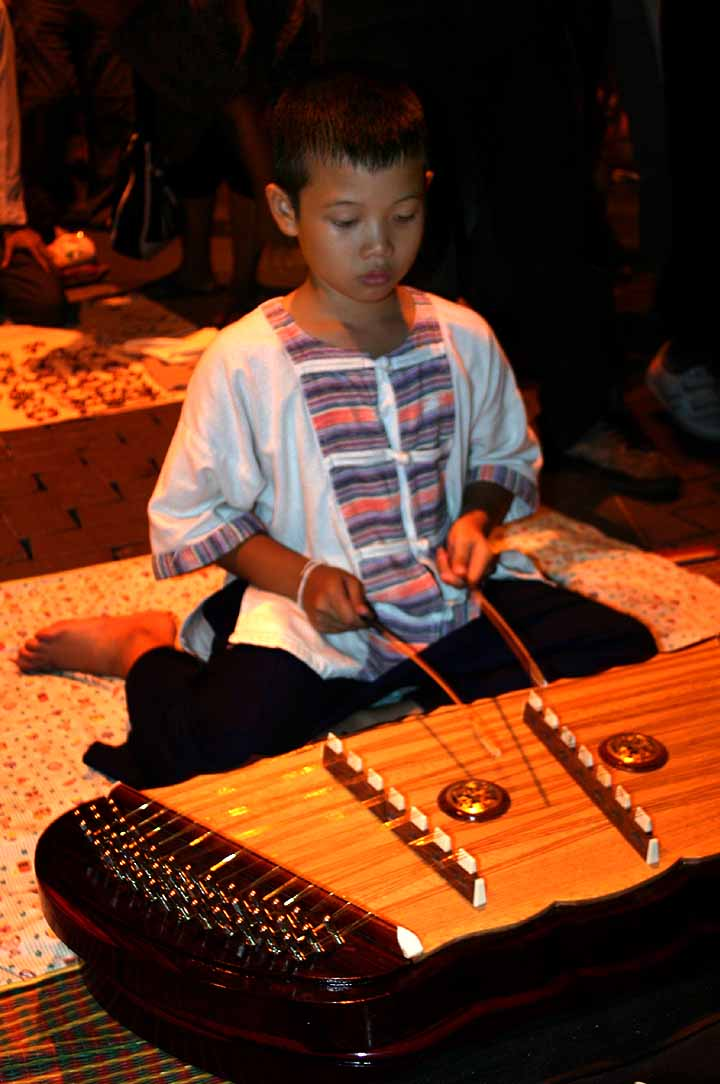
A boy playing a khim (hammered dulcimer)

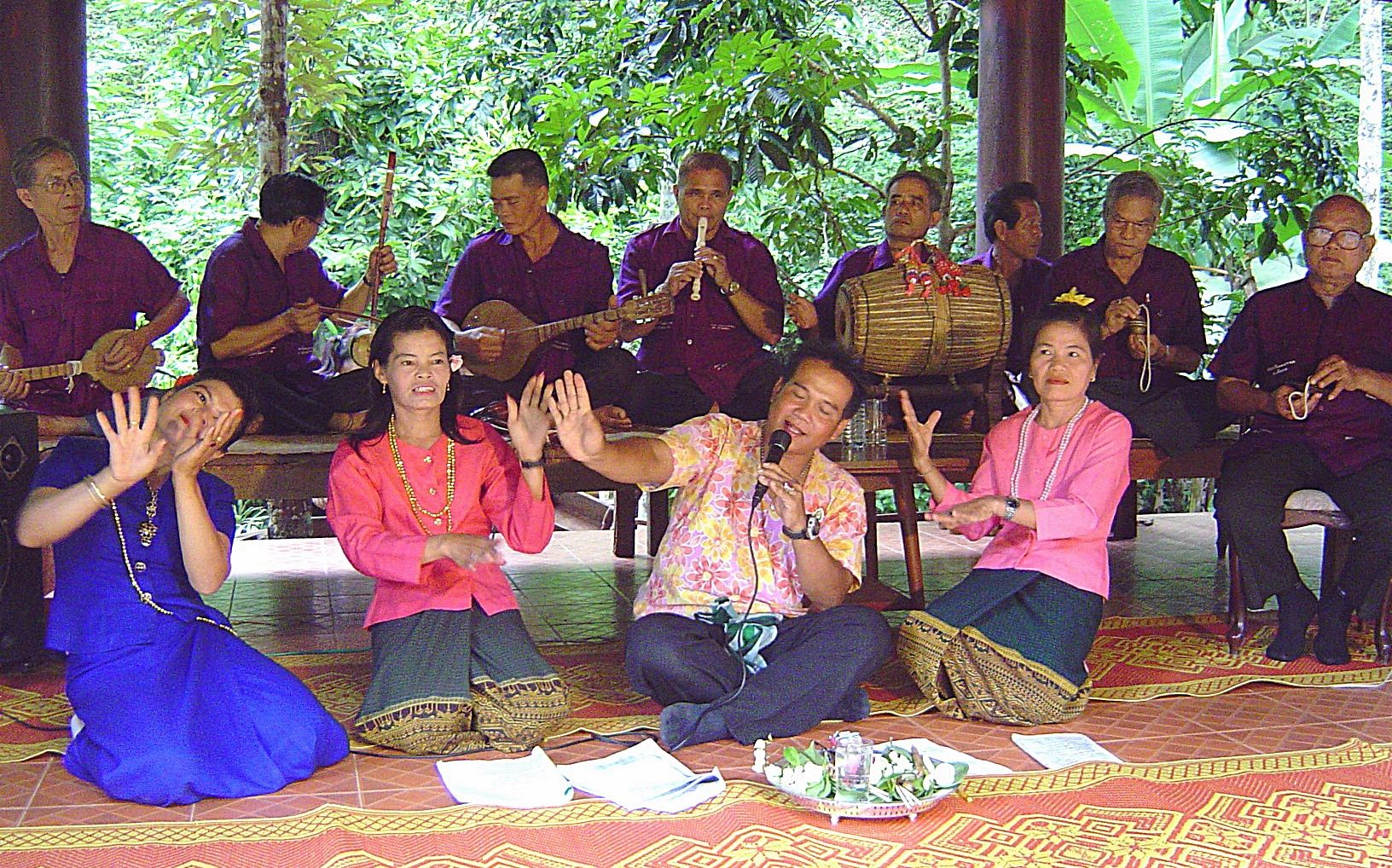
Thai traditional musical ensembles at Wat Kungtapao Local Museum

=== Plucked ===
- Krachappi (กระจับปี่) - ancient fretted lute
- Chakhe (จะเข้) - crocodile-shaped fretted floor zither with three strings. The first two strings are made from silk, and the last is made from bronze
- Phin (พิณ) - three-stringed lute used in the Isan region
- Phin phia (พิณเพียะ) - chest-resonated stick zither played by the Northern Thai people
- Sueng (ซึง) - plucked lute from the northern region
- Phin hai (พิณไห) or hai song (ไหซอง) - a set of earthenware jars with rubber bands stretched over the open mouths

=== Bowed ===
- Saw duang (ซอด้วง) - higher two-string fiddle with hardwood body; used in classical music
- Saw sam sai (ซอสามสาย) - three-string spike fiddle with coconut shell body; used in classical music; also known as the most beautiful of the fiddles
- Saw u (ซออู้) - lower two-string fiddle with a coconut shell body; used in classical music
- Saw klang (ซอกลาง) - a slightly larger, lower-pitched version of the saw duang, which is rarely used in the modern day
- Saw krapawng (ซอกระป๋อง)- two-string fiddles with body made from a metal can; used in the Isan region; saw krapong is smaller
- Saw pip (ซอปี๊บ) In a larger version of the saw krapang, the resonator is made of aluminum or large stainless steel crafted into the box. Bamboo neck and wooden pegs (shaft), it uses steel strings. The sound is lower than that of saw krapang. Usually, saw pip is only for the blind and beggars used for the purpose of busking to earn money.
- Saw bang/Saw phu thai (ซอบั้ง) - a made from bamboo, used in the Isan region. It is similar xi xa lo of Thai people (Vietnam).
- Salo (สะล้อ) - two- or three-string spike fiddle used in the northern region

=== Struck ===
- Khim (ขิม) - hammered dulcimer was classified as an idiophone

== Percussion ==
=== Drums ===
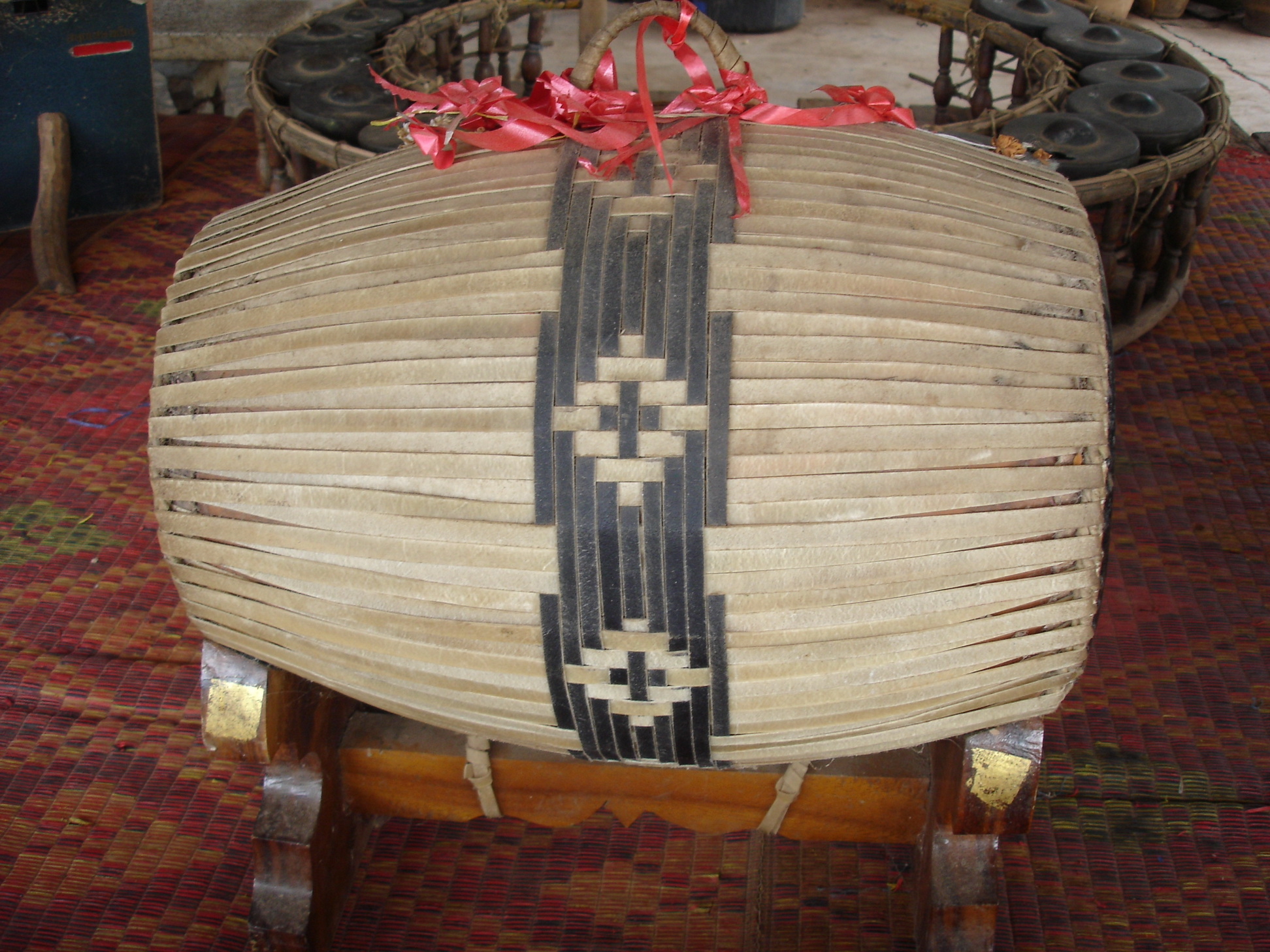
A taphon

- Taphon (ตะโพน) or klawng taphon (กลองตะโพน) - sacred barrel drum; played with the hands and used in the piphat ensemble and it is an membranophone
- Taphon mon (ตะโพนมอญ) - large drum played with the hand, used in the piphat mon
- Klong that (กลองทัด) - large drum played with sticks; usually played in a pair and used in the piphat ensemble
- Klong chatri (กลองชาตรี), also known as klong tuk (กลองตุ๊ก) - same as klong that but smaller, played with sticks; used in the piphat chatri
- Rammana (รำมะนา) - frame drum; played with the hand
- Thon (โทน) - goblet drum; played with the hand
  - Thon chatri (โทนชาตรี)
  - Thon mahori (โทนมโหรี)
- Klong thap (กลองทับ) - goblet drum used primarily in southern Thai folk music, also used to create a beat in southern that shows or Nora shows.
- Klong khaek (กลองแขก) - barrel drum; played with the hands and generally played in pairs
- Klong song na (กลองสองหน้า) - barrel drum; played with the hands
- Klong yao (กลองยาว) - long drum; played with the hands
- Poeng mang khok (เปิงมางคอก), or simply poeng mang (เปิงมาง) - set of tuned drums used in the piphat mon
- Klong bantho (กลองบัณเฑาะว์) - smallest hourglass pellet drum, like the Damaru and Dhadd in India; used in the Royal Thai Brahmanism-Hinduism Ceremony or ritual about the Thai Royal Family
- Klong seng (กลองเส็ง), Klong ching (กลองจิ่ง), or Klong tae (กลองแตะ) - large drum played with sticks; generally played in pairs and used in competition in the Isan region, particularly by the Phu Thai people

=== Gong chimes ===
- Khong wong lek (ฆ้องวงเล็ก) - higher gong circle; comprises many small tuned bossed gongs mounted in a rattan frame
- Khong wong yai (ฆ้องวงใหญ่)- lower gong circle; comprises many small tuned bossed gongs mounted in a rattan frame
- Khong mon (ฆ้องมอญ) - set of many small tuned bossed gongs arranged in vertical curved frame; usually primarily in funeral music
- Khong rang (ฆ้องราง) - set of eight tuned gongs suspended horizontally in a straight frame; similar to the southern Philippine kulintang; rare

=== Pitched percussion ===
- Ranat (ระนาด) - trough-resonated keyboard percussion instrument; generally played with two mallets and used in Thai classical and theater music
  - Ranat ek (ระนาดเอก) - higher xylophone, with bars usually made of hardwood
  - Ranat thum (ระนาดทุ้ม) - lower xylophone, with bamboo or hardwood bars
  - Ranat ek lek (ระนาดเอกเหล็ก) - higher metallophone
  - Ranat thum lek (ระนาดทุ้มเหล็ก) - lower metallophone
  - Ranat kaeo (ระนาดแก้ว) - crystallophone; very rare
- Pong lang (โปงลาง) - pentatonic log xylophone used in the Isan region

=== Gongs ===
- Khong chai (ฆ้องชัย), also called khong hui (ฆ้องหุ่ย) or khong mui (ฆ้องมุ่ย) - huge hanging bossed gong used for indicating time
- Khong mong (ฆ้องโหม่ง) or mong (โหม่ง) - medium-sized hanging bossed gong used in Thai ensembles
- Khong meng (ฆ้องเหม่ง) or khong kratae (ฆ้องกระแต) - small bossed gong used as a signaling device and in traditional parades with klawng yao
- Khong rao (ฆ้องราว) - three bossed gongs (small, medium, and large) suspended vertically in a wooden frame; rare
- Khong khu (ฆ้องคู่) - pair of small bossed gongs suspended horizontally in a wooden box; used in theater music and music of southern Thailand
- Khong wong chai (วงฆ้องชัย) - set of seven large bossed gongs suspended vertically in a circular frame; rare

=== Clappers ===
- Krap (กรับ) - clapper
  - Krap phuang (กรับพวง) - bundle of hardwood and brass slats, tied together at one end
  - Krap sepha (กรับเสภา) - pair of bamboo or hardwood sticks

=== Cymbals ===
- Ching (ฉิ่ง) - pair of small, thick cymbals joined by a cord; used to mark time
- Chap (ฉาบ) - pair of flat cymbals joined by a cord
  - Chap lek (ฉาบเล็ก) - smaller
  - Chap yai (ฉาบใหญ่) - larger

=== Bell ===
- Kangsdal (กังสดาล) - bell made from bronze, usually used in ancient monk rituals

=== Shaken bamboo ===
- Angklung (อังกะลุง) - set of tuned bamboo tubes mounted in a frame and shaken; generally played by a group. Comes from Indonesia.

== Wind ==
=== Flutes ===
- Khlui (ขลุ่ย) - vertical duct flute made of bamboo, hardwood, or plastic
  - Khlui lib (ขลุ่ยหลิบ or ขลุ่ยหลีบ; treble); not commonly used
  - Khlui phiang aw (ขลุ่ยเพียงออ; medium)
  - Khlui u (ขลุ่ยอู้; bass); not commonly used
- Wot (โหวด) - circular panpipe used in the Isan region. Play by holding between the hands, and while rotating, blow downwards into the pipes.

=== Free-reed ===
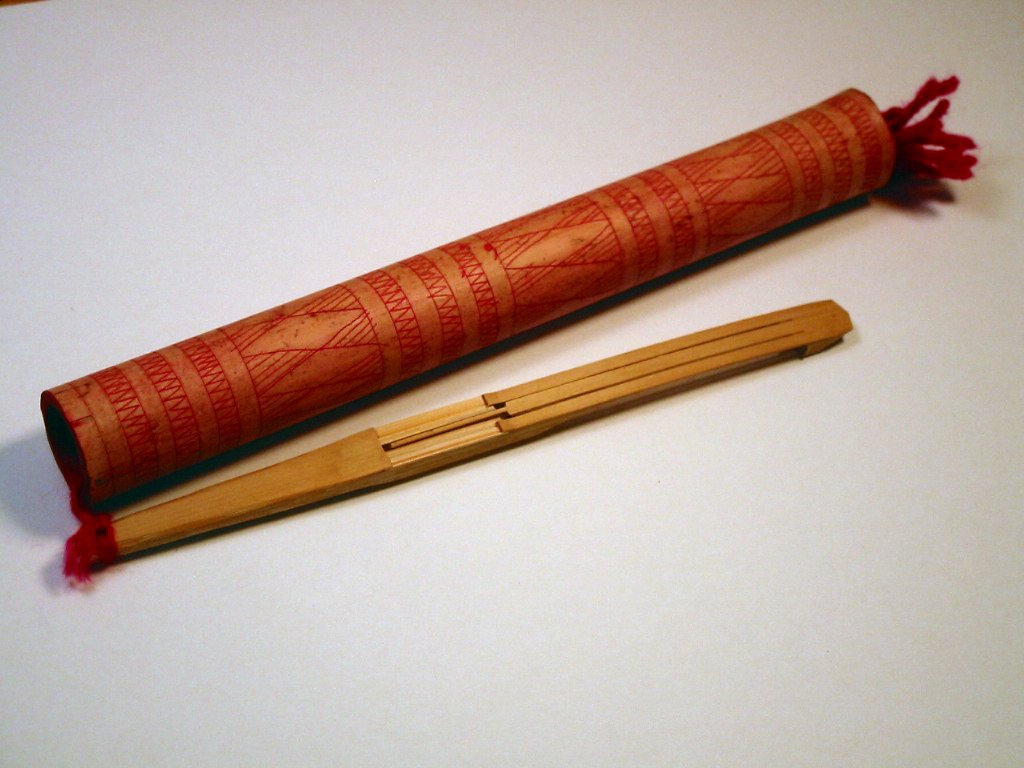
Chongnong (จ้องหน่อง) jaw harp.

- Khaen (แคน) - mouth organ used in the Isan region
  - Khaen hok (แคนหก, hok meaning "six") - small khaen with 12 pipes in two rows of 6; usually used by children or beginners, or sold to tourists
  - Khaen jet (แคนเจ็ด, jet meaning "seven") - medium-sized khaen with 14 pipes in two rows of 7
  - Khaen paet (แคนแปด, paet meaning "eight") - medium-sized khaen with 16 pipes in two rows of 8; the most commonly used variety
  - Khaen gao (แคนเก้า, gao meaning "nine") - khaen with 18 pipes in two rows of 9; usually very long
  - Khaen sip (แคนสิบ, sip meaning "ten") - an "improved" version of the khaen paet; little used
- Pi chum (ปี่จุม; called ปี่ซอ pi so in northern Thailand) - free reed pipe used in the northern region
- Gourd mouth organ - used by the Akha (called lachi), Lisu (called fulu), and Lahu (called naw) peoples of the upland regions of northern Thailand
- Jaw harp (called chongnong (จ้องหน่อง) in central Thailand and huen (หืน) in northeast Thailand) - played primarily among ethnic minorities of northern Thailand, as well as by the people of the Isan region.

=== Oboes ===
- Pi (ปี่) - quadruple- or double-reed oboe
  - Pi chanai (ปี่ไฉน) - possibly derived from the Indian shehnai
  - Pi chawa (ปี่ชวา) - used to accompany Muay Thai
  - Pi klang (ปี่กลาง)
  - Pi mon (ปี่มอญ; မွန်နှဲ) - large double-reed oboe with detachable metal bell; used for funeral music
  - Pi nai (ปี่ใน) - standard leading instrument used in the piphat ensemble
  - Pi nok (ปี่นอก)

=== Horns ===
- Trae (แตร) - metal horn
- Sang (สังข์) - conch shell horn; also called trae sang (แตรสังข์) or Sangkhla
- Thai fanfare trumpet - used only in royal ceremonies

== Central ==
- Saw sam sai
- Saw duang
- Saw u
- Jakhe
- Khlui
- Pi
- Ranat ek
- Ranat thum
- Khong wong yai
- Khong wong lek
- Thon rammana
- Glong khaek
- Glong songna

== Northeast ==
- Huen - This drum is shaped like a drum that is used in the puang mang kog set. It is always played with a piphat ensemble.
- Khaen - mouth organ
- Wot - a circular panpipe made of 6-9 various lengths of small bamboo pipes. Play by holding between the hands, and while rotating, blow downwards into the pipes.

(mai-ruak or mai-hia, mai-ku-khan)

- Phin - a fretted, plucked lute
- Pong lang - log xylophone played by two players with hard stick. Its shape is like a xylophone consisting of 15 wooden bars stringed together
- Jakhe (Kabue) - one of the important instruments in the mahori khamen ensemble. It has three strings
- Grajabpi - The krachappi is a plucked stringed instrument. Its turtle shape sound box is made of jackfruit wood
- Saw kan truem - a bowed string instrument with a wooden soundbox, the head of which is covered with snakeskin.
- Saw phu thai - a tube zither/Idiochord made from bamboo, played by Isan people
- Glong kan truem - a single-headed drum
- Pi salai - a double-reed oboe accompanied with kantrum ensemble
- Krap khu - a pair of hard wooden bars two pairs made a set, played with both hands as percussion in "Kantruem ensemble".

== North ==
- Salo (สะล้อ) - spike fiddle with two or three strings and a free bow. The resonator is made of coconut shell cut off on one side.
- Sueng - is a plucked string instrument, made of teak or hardwood. A round sound hole is cut on the top soundboard.
- Khlui - The same as the Central Thai khlui.
- Pi chum (called pi so in northern Thailand) - a free reed pipe made of bamboo, with a single metal reed
- Pi nae - a double reed oboe that resembles the saranai or chani but larger in size; it is made of wood and usually accompanies the large gong.
- Phin phia - or sometimes simply called "pia" or "phia". The body is made from a coconut shell.
- Glong teng thing - Klong Teng-thing is a two faced tabular drum and used as one of percussive instrument.
- Talotpot - or Malotpot is a two-faced tubular drum of 100 centimeters long.
- Glong tingnong - The biggest and longest drum with one face made of hide about 3–4 metres long.
- Glong sabat chai - The most famous drum in northern, hanging on the double wooden bars carried by men

== South ==
- Thap - The goblet-shaped drum used for providing the changes of rhythm and also for supporting rhythm of the Nora (Southern dance drama).
- Glong nora - Klong nora or Klong nang: a barrel-shaped drum used to accompany the Nora dance or the Nang talung (Shadow puppet) performance
- Mong ching - Mong and Ching: two important percussion instruments used for accompanying the Nora dance (dance drama) and the Nang talung (shadow puppet) performance.
- Khong khu - pair of small bossed gongs suspended horizontally in a wooden box; used in theater music and music of southern Thailand
- Pi - a quadruple-reed oboe type with six finger holes producing at least three octaves of pitches range.
- Trae phuang - Trae phuang or Krap phung: a percussion used to provide rhythmic punctuation of the Nora ensemble.

== See also ==
- Music of Thailand
