= Đàn nhị =

Vietnamese bowed string instrument

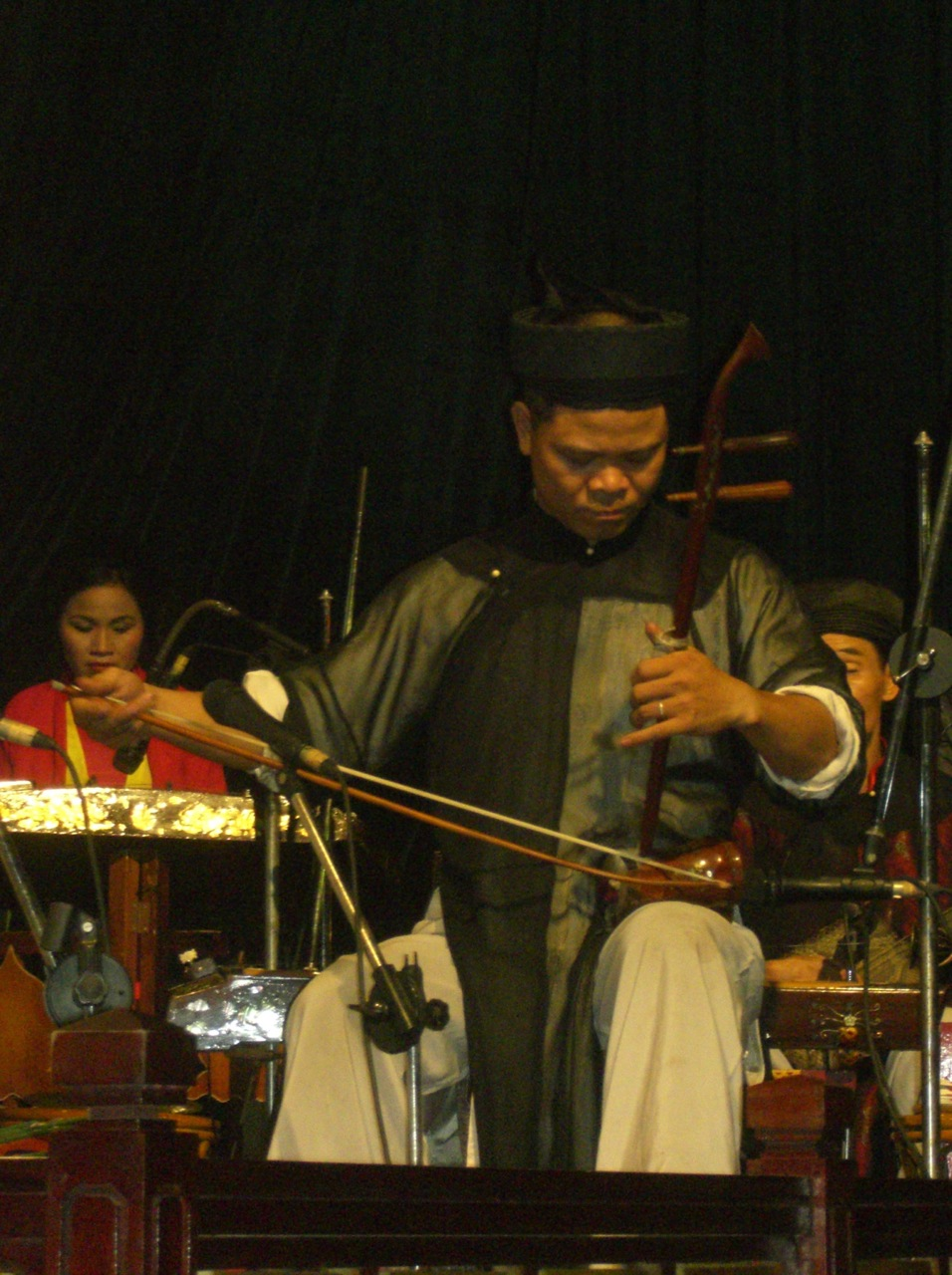
Player of đàn nhị.

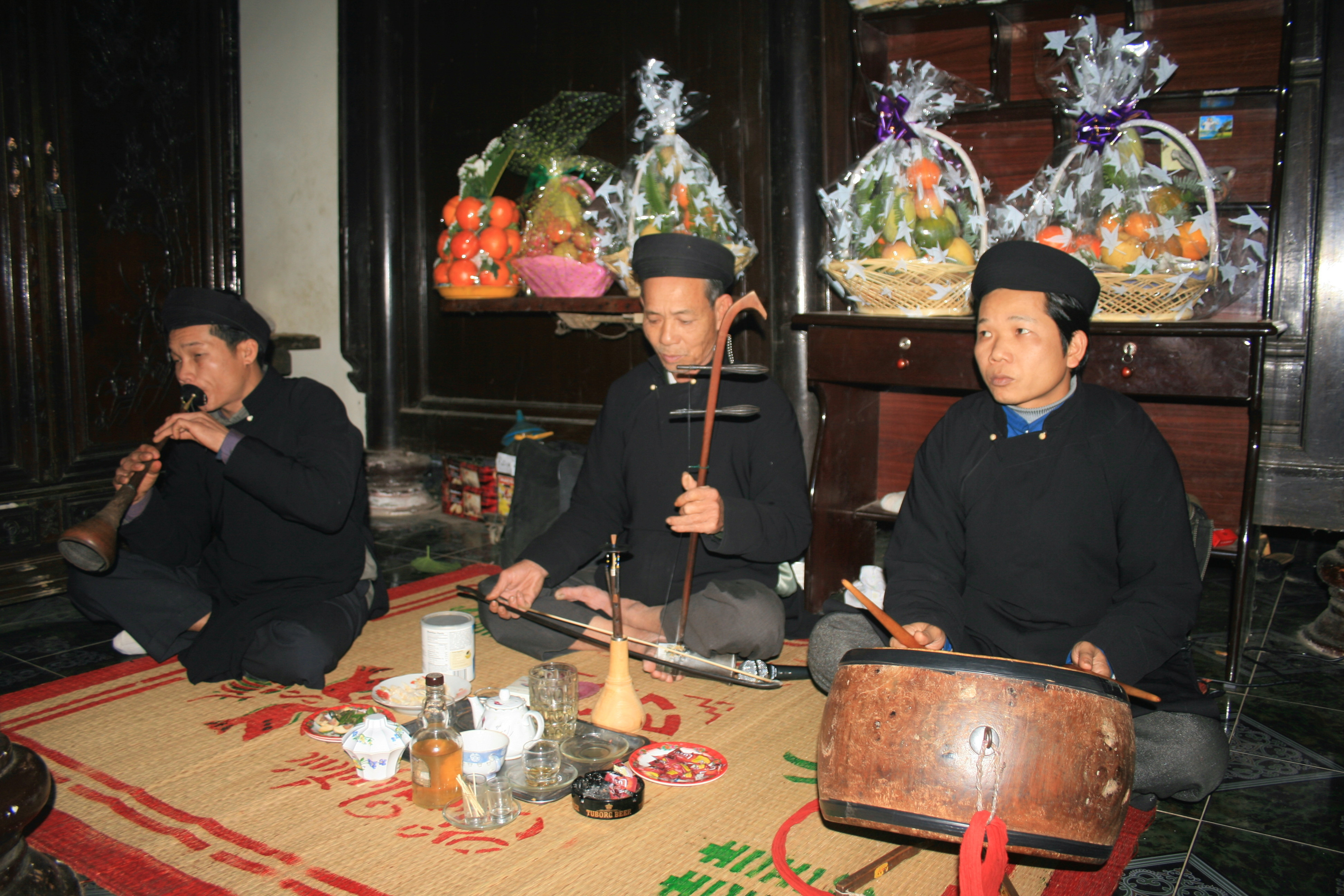
Man sitting in the centre playing the đàn nhị.

The đàn nhị (Vietnamese: [ɗâːn ɲîˀ], Chữ Nôm: 彈二), also called đàn cò, is a Vietnamese bowed string instrument with two strings. The word nhị means "two" in Sino-Vietnamese, and đàn means "instrument". Its sound box is generally covered on one end with snakeskin.

There is some variation in construction between different forms of the đàn nhị. Instruments colloquially referred to as đàn cò are often more similar to the Chinese Erxian Khmer tro and Thai saw duang, while instruments referred to as đàn nhị are often constructed more similarly to the modern erhu of China. However, in the past, both names referred to what is now generally called the đàn cò. In the past, it was often paired with the Đàn gáo, not unlike the pairing of the Yehu and Erxian/Gaohu in Cantonese music, or the pairing of the Saw duang and Saw u in Thailand, although this pairing is a bit more rare in modern times as the đàn gáo is falling into disuse. As well, the traditional handmade đàn nhị have been replaced by Erhus purchased from China in Nhạc dân tộc cải biên ensembles.

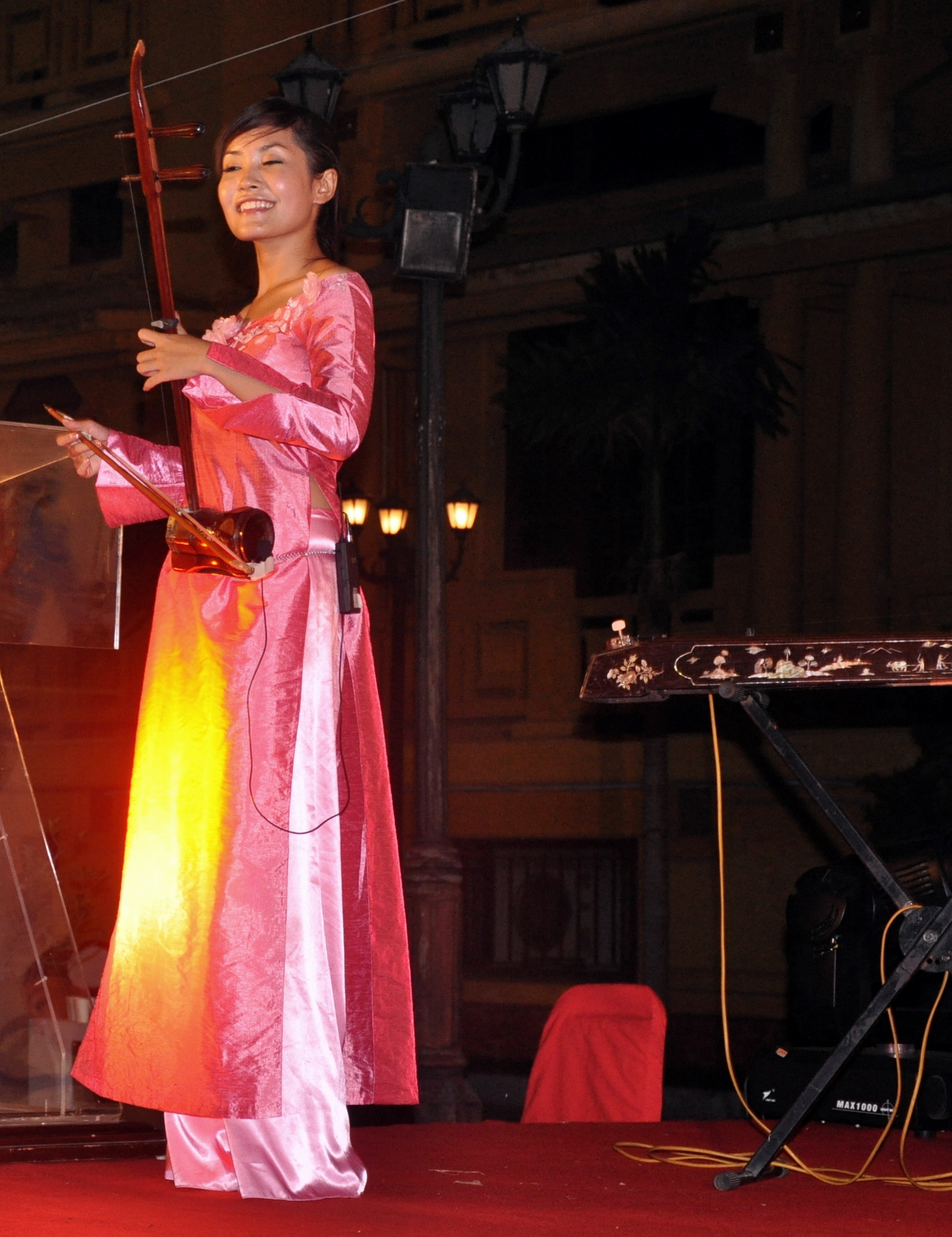
A woman is playing the đàn nhị

It is related to the huqin family of instruments of China. Some Austroasiatic groups in Vietnam also have their version of the đàn cò. The Mường have the cò kè, the Chứt have the t'rơbon, the Khua have the karong, and the Khmer have the tro.

== See also ==
- Music of Vietnam
- Huqin
