= Saw sam sai =

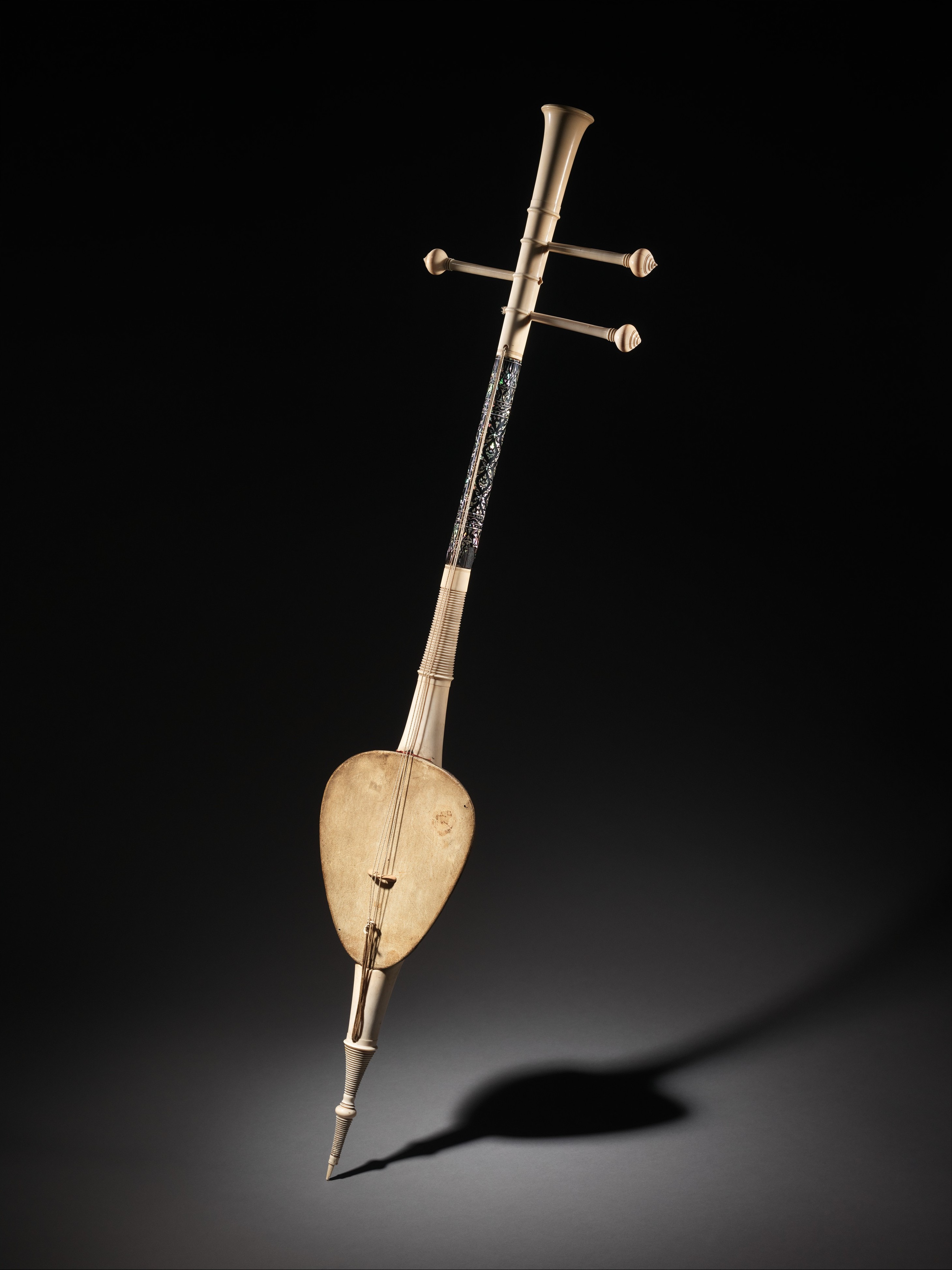
- Saw sam sai at the Metropolitan Museum of Art

String instrument
- Other names: ซอสามสาย
- Classification: Bowed string instrument

Related instruments
- Tro Khmer; Indonesian rebab

Sound sample
- Recording demonstrating the sound of a saw sam sai

The saw sam sai (Thai: ซอสามสาย, pronounced [sɔː sǎːm sǎːj]; RTGS: so sam sai; also spelled sō sām sāi, saw samsai, and occasionally simply sam sai; lit. 'three-stringed fiddle') is a traditional bowed string instrument of Thailand. It is in the saw family of Thai fiddles, which also includes the saw u and saw duang, but unlike the other two, it has three strings and a bow that is separate from the instrument.

The saw sam sai is made up of three parts: the bout, the neck, and the bow. It has a three-lobed coconut bowl for a body, covered on one end with animal skin, and a hardwood or ivory neck that is cleaned and polished with wood varnish. Its bow is constructed of horsetail and hardwood. Other elements include the pegs, nut, bridge, lasso, and strings. Typically, the player glues a jewel onto the skin before playing to reduce the skin's resonance. The instrument is regarded as one of high stature and is often ornately decorated. It is believed to have been used since the Sukhothai period, and is related to a very similar Cambodian instrument called tro Khmer.

The three silk strings on the saw sam sai produce the notes "so" on the higher-pitched upper string (สายเอก, sai ek, or สายบน, sai bon), "re" on the middle string (สายใน, sai nai, or สายกลาง, sai klang) and "la" on the lower-pitched bottom string (สายทุ้ม, sai thum, or สายล่าง, sai lang).

== History ==
The saw sam sai is a bowed-string instrument with three strings and is usually played in mahori ensembles and string bands. Its similarity to other stringed instruments suggests it may have originated from Persia, the Arab world, Cambodia, Indonesia, or Thailand.

The saw sam sai is virtually identical to the salo, a bowed string instrument from Northern Thailand. These two instruments both have three strings, use the same method of playing, and require a foot for support. The only difference is that the saw sam sai has an elevated social status, unlike the salo.

The saw sam sai has been played since at least the Sukhothai Kingdom, when it was utilized in royal rituals and incorporated into mahori ensembles. According to 17th-century reports by Simon de la Loubère in Du Royaume de Siam, the Thai people had a tiny orchestra instrument called a "saw". This suggests that saw sam sai was highly popular among Thai people throughout the Ayutthaya period, until the Rattanakosin phase of King Rama II's reign. Because of King Rama II's passion for saw sam sai, he reimagined the instrument as exquisite, elevating is social status.

After studying the origin of saw sam sai, the research found that Middle East countries are more advanced in their musical instrument culture. Other instruments that resemble the saw sam sai are the kamancheh from the west of Persia, the rebab from Egypt and Turkey, the rebab from Indonesia and Malaysia, the Tro Khmer from Cambodia, the saw rung-kee (sarangi) from India, and the saw mon from Myanmar.

=== Origin theories ===
Researchers have different theories about the origin of the saw sam sai.

Thanit Yuupo (ธนิต อยู่โพธิ์) explained that the saw sam sai is similar to the Japanese shamisen and the Chinese sanxian, both of which are also fretless stringed instruments. The shamisen's body is square and flat, and the sanxian's body is smaller and covered in snakeskin. However, neither is bowed like the saw sam sai.

Jenjira Benjapong (เจนจิรา เบญจพงศ์) stated her opinion that the saw sam sai ultimately derives from the kamancheh, a Persian instrument. The kamancheh gave rise to the Middle Eastern rebab, which influenced the Thai saw sam sai, Cambodian saw Khmer, and Malay peninsula rebab. Being suitable to accompany singing, the rebab in Indonesia and Malaysia commonly accompanies the lead vocalist, much as the saw sam sai does in Thailand.

Pongsin Aroonrat (พงษ์ศิลป์ อรุณรัตน์) presumed that saw sam sai evolved from the Persian rebab, which is the root of numerous bowed string instruments, including the saw sam sai and violin. Java has a rebab instrument, and Cambodia has a similar instrument called a tro.

David Morton supposed that the original look of the saw sam sai originated in east India. Following then, the saw sam sai spread over various trading routes. The nan-chou, a bowed string instrument with a sharp point on the body, kamancheh, and rebab were the most common bowed string instruments discovered in that region.

Udom Arunrut (อุดม อรุณรัตน์) said Thailand obtained the saw sam sai from Persia and used it in numerous rituals and royal events in the same way as the Persians. At the time, both nations were tightly linked by language, culture, and art.

Suksant Puangklad (สุขสันต์ พ่วงกลัด) explained that the Islamic cultural group has a musical instrument that resembles the Thai saw sam sai, which has since diversified into numerous instruments, including the masenqo of east and west Africa, goje of Niger, rebab soussi of Morocco, joze of Iraq and Iran, kamaicha of India, ghaychak of Afghanistan, rebab of Java's gamelan ensembles, rebab of Malaysia, Tro Khmer of Cambodia, and salo of Lan Na of Thailand.

== Construction ==
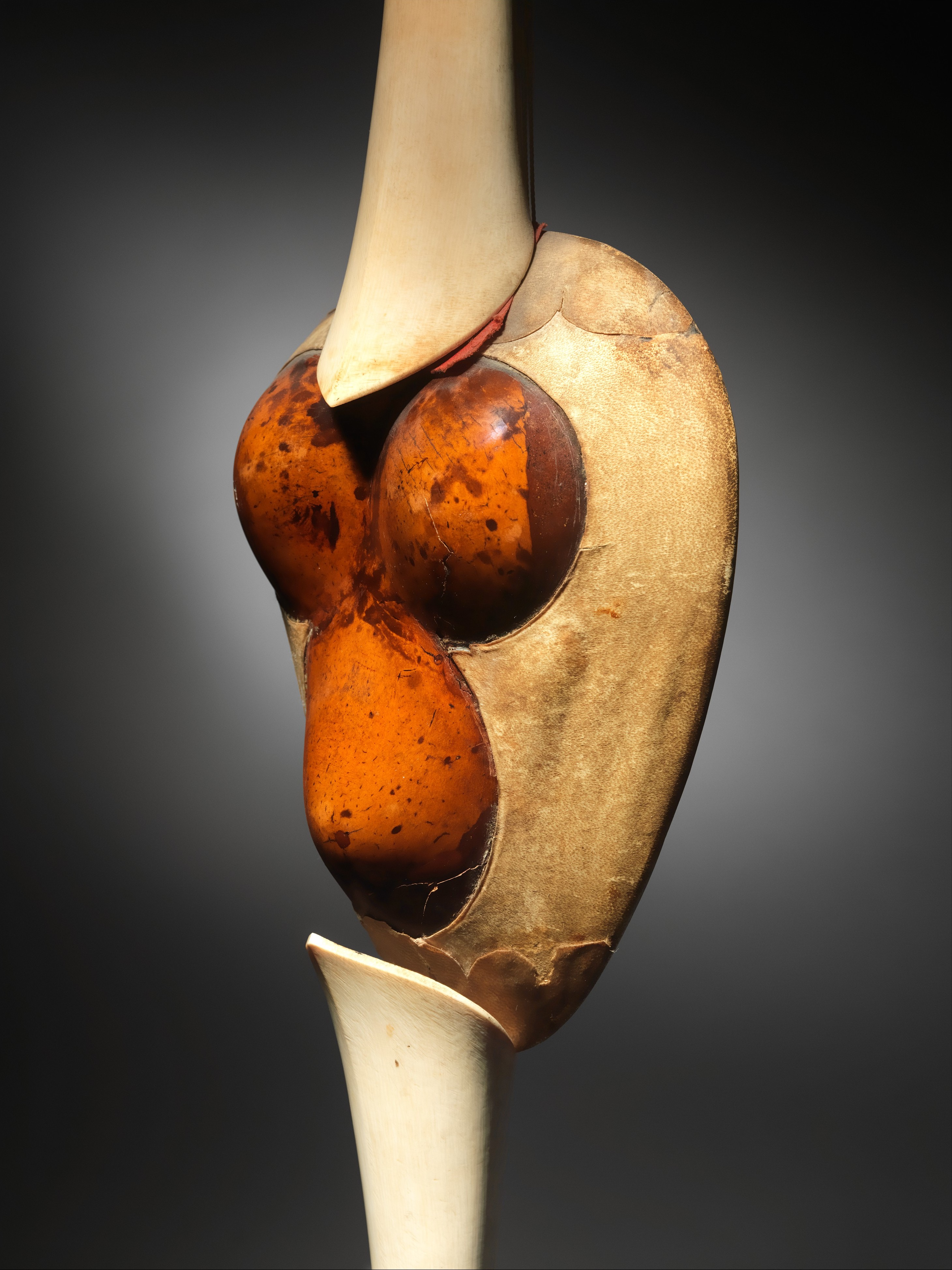
Back of a saw sam sai, Thailand, 19th century

=== Components ===
The bow (Thai: คันชัก, romanized: kanchak) is strung with 250–300 pieces of horsetail or string.

From top to bottom, the body (คันซอ, kaun saw) consists of many components:

1. The pegs box (ทวนบน, tuaun bond) is the top of the fiddle and has a length of about 1 foot. The pegs box is shaped by a lathe and is cylindrical in shape. It has a hole at the bottom to connect to the upper neck, and three holes on the sides for the pegs.
2. The pegs connect to pegs box alternating in a zigzag pattern. The head is spherical in shape and the stick has a length of about 6 inches.
3. The upper neck (ทวนกลาง, tuaun graang) connects the pegs box to a lower neck. It has a cylindrical shape and is made from metal, with a diameter of about 1.125 inches and a length of about 9 inches.
4. A nut is used for firmly tying the three strings to the upper neck to produce stable sound quality. Normally silk or the upper string is used for the nut.
5. The lower neck (ทวนล่าง, tuaun laung) connects to the bout. It has a length of about 1 foot. It is turned in spherical shapes arranged in a row from small to large.
6. The bout (กระโหลกซอ, kalogue saw) is made from three coconut shells, together with wood and goatskin.
7. The bridge is made of bamboo in a curved shape, used to support the strings. With a height of about 2 cm, it is located on the front of the fiddle 3 cm from the top edge.
8. Jewelry is used to decorate and improve the sound of the fiddle.
9. Lasso is silk used for tying and holding the strings, located at foot of the fiddle. Normally the middle string is used because it has the right size to tie the upper string and lower string.
10. The strings are made of spiral silk. The upper string is the biggest string and the lower string is the smallest string.
11. The foot (เท้าซอ, town saw) is the base of the fiddle, and has the physical appearance of a headdress (chada).

=== Bout ===
The bout is the main component of a fiddle, responsible for the sound, so care must be taken to find the best material for construction. Normally a three-lobed coconut shell is used; it must be symmetric with a thickness of about 0.5 cm. The coconut shell is peeled and a hole drilled to drain the coconut water. It is scrubbed and dried at room temperature for 1–2 weeks, after which it is cut and scrubbed inside using an electric polishing machine and sandpaper. The front of the shell is covered with goatskin or cow leather that is about 0.15 mm thick. After soaking in water for 3–4 hours, it is glued to the edge of the shell. The bout is then decorated to finish.

=== Pegs box, bottom neck, and foot ===
The size of the pegs box, bottom neck, and foot of fiddle depend on the size of the bout of the fiddle—if the bout is large, then these components will also be large. The pegs, pegs box, bottom neck, and foot are normally made of hardwood or tusk, and are all shaped using a lathe. The pegs box is used for tuning and also for increasing the sound frequency. For the pegs box, three holes are drilled for the pegs (two on the left, one on the right), and one hole is drilled through the bottom to connect it to the upper neck. For the bottom neck, the upper part is shaped like a marble and the lower part is shaped like an elephant's mouth. The foot of the fiddle is shaped like a Thai pagoda.

=== Strings ===
All three strings are made of silk, with four procedures used to make each string: spinning, silk tacking, gluing, and silk stranding. After gathering the silk from the silkworm, a spinning machine collects the silk onto a thread spool. 20 cm of nylon is used to make a lasso. The lasso hook is brought to the stranding machine, along with 8 spools of silk used for the upper string, 14 spools for the middle string, or 20 spools for the lower string. The silk is tacked to the stranding machine and stranded to make the string.

== Tuning ==
The first thing that one does before tuning is stand the bridge. The bridge is set into the middle of the fiddle and away from the top of the bout around 1–2 inches. For tuning, each peg is turned to the front of the fiddle to tighten its string, while the bridge is kept stationary. A khim is used for the initial sound of the fiddle. The notes "so", "re", and "la" are used for the upper string, middle string, and lower string respectively. The tuning is checked by bowing the fiddle. Finally, a jewel can be attached to the bout for upgraded sound quality.

== Playing ==
=== Sitting posture ===
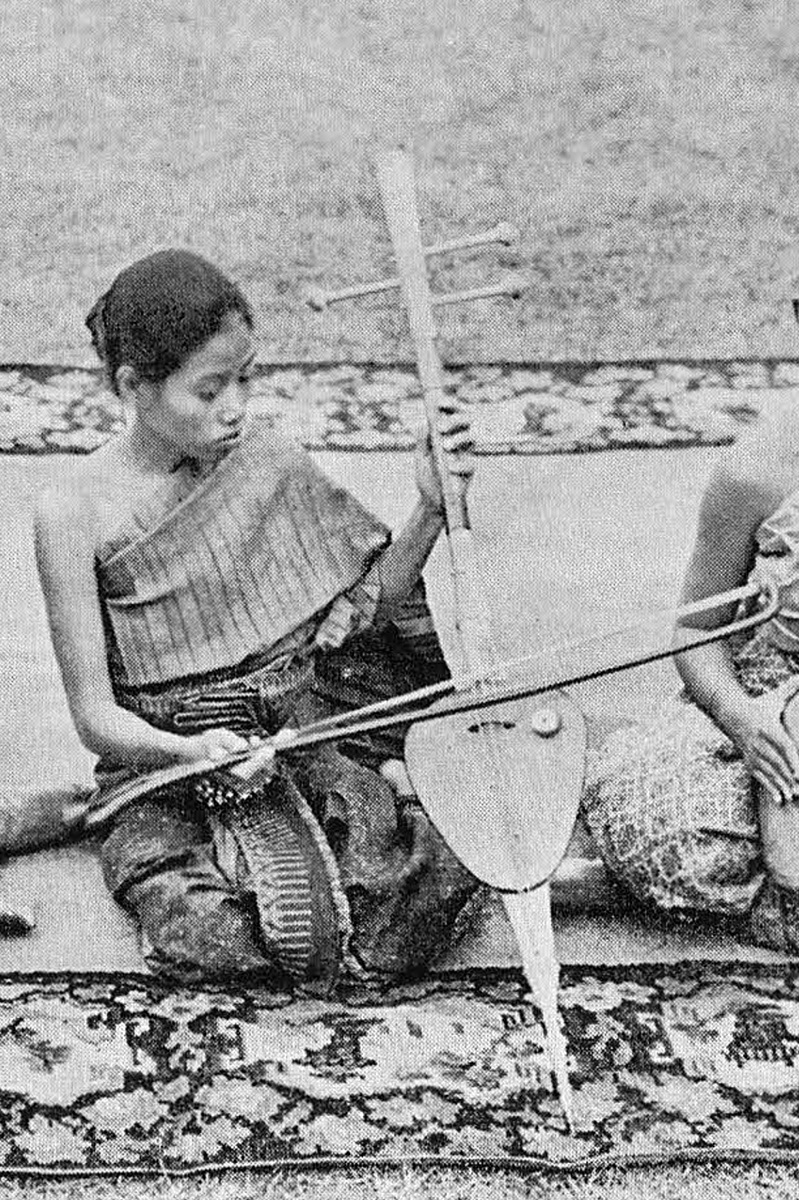
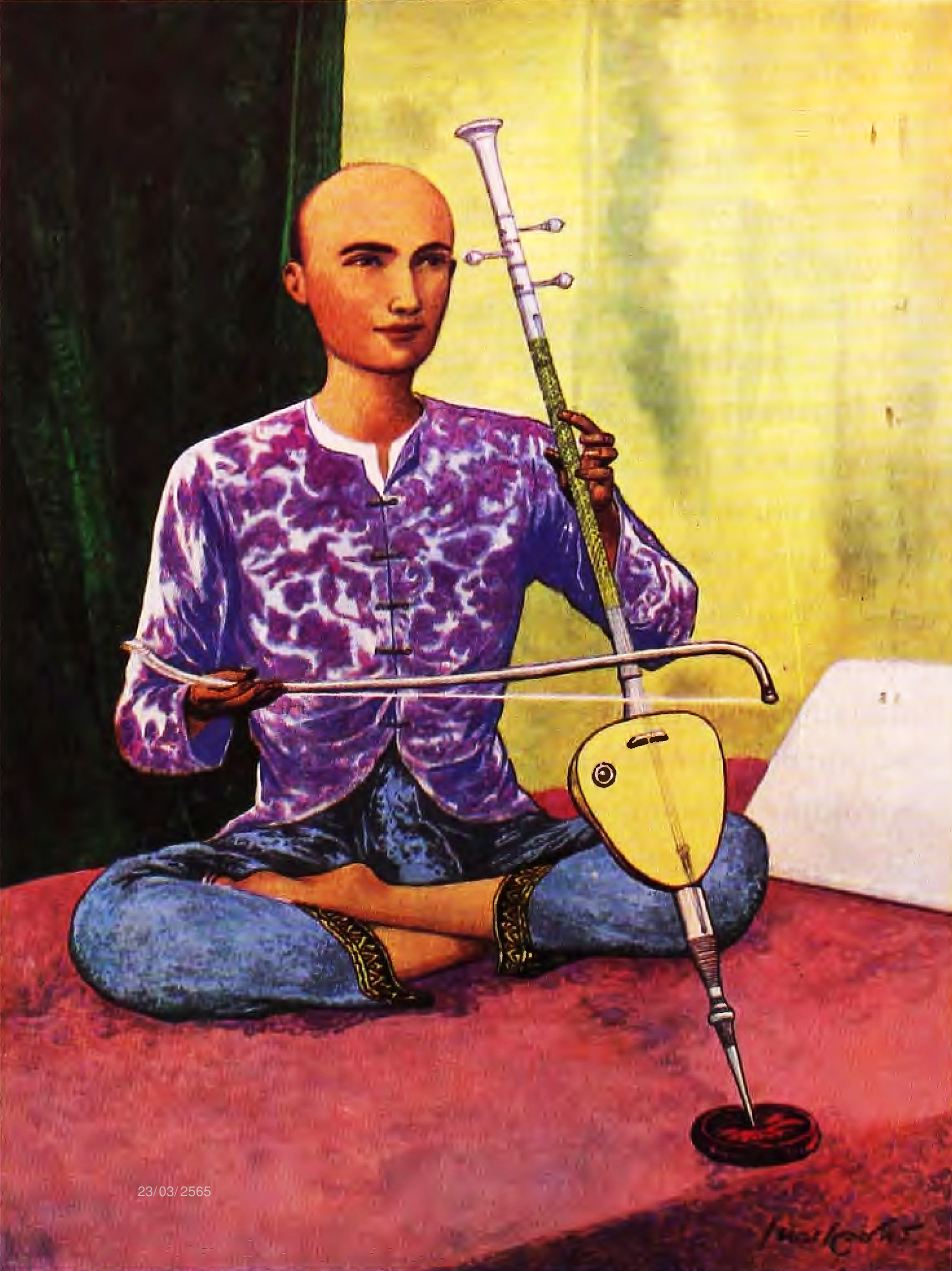
Sitting posture for playing saw sam sai.

There are two sitting postures for playing saw sam sai. The first is to sit with legs to the side, where one leg on top of the other, stretching the player toe to the side while folding the knees (recommended for beginners). The other is Vajrasana, a kneeling hatha yoga and contemporary yoga posture, also known as 'Thunderbolt Pose' or 'Diamond Pose'.

=== Holding posture ===
Balance the iron needle on the bottom end of the saw sam sai on the ground. Hold the body of saw sam sai with the left arm, keeping it at the same level as the left thigh. Face the saw sam sai outside, and put the knob on the third string.

Slightly turn the left palm to the front. Lean the neck of the saw sam sai against the space between the thumb and index finger. If holding the saw sam sai correctly, the pinky finger will not reach the string comfortably.

Hold the bow with the right hand. Put the right hand around the area where the gap between the horsetail and the bow is about 4 centimeters. Put the ring finger between the horsetail and the bow. Use index finger and middle finger to support the bow while the wrist is parallel with the right arm. The performer needs to be careful not to bend the right hand askew with the right arm. While performing, the bow needs to always parallel to the ground.

=== Bow handling ===
Use the right arm and right hand to control the movement of the bow. Have the bow parallel to the ground and have the horsetail touch the string above the body around 3 centimeters. To increase the volume, use the ring finger to push the horsetail towards you. The most important thing is to balance the volume of the upper string and lower string.

=== Finger gesture ===
To determine the sound of the upper string and the middle string, the performer uses the index finger, middle finger, ring finger, and pinky finger. To determine the sound of the lower string, use the index finger, middle finger, and ring finger. To press the upper string, stick the fingertip to the side of the upper string; this technique is called "chun sai". Any finger (except the thumb) can be used in "chun sai".

=== Conducting ===
One of the uniqueness of Thai instruments is "melody conducting", in which every performer conducts together harmoniously. For saw sam sai, conducting can be divided into two types: conducting as a band and conducting with a lead singer.

When conducting as a band, the performer is guided by the other band members and the flow of the music. Therefore, the performer needs to understand the melody, musical type, and performance style. The most important thing the performer needs to commit to memory is that harmony is at the heart of playing as a band.

The performer needs to play in the "Chou Chou" rhythm (ทำนองจาวๆ) which imitates "Saratta" rhythm (ทํานองสารัตถะ) as closely as possible. The performer needs to be mindful not to overuse the uniqueness of the sound of the "sol" and "re" notes.

When conducting with a lead singer, it is crucial that the performer can recognize or sing the lyrics. The main role of the player is to support the lead singer, primarily with the instrument and possibly with singing accompaniment. However, the player needs to be cautious not to distract or overshadow the lead singer.

== See also ==
- Traditional Thai musical instruments
- Music of Thailand
