= Sueng =

Plucked fretted lute from northern Thailand

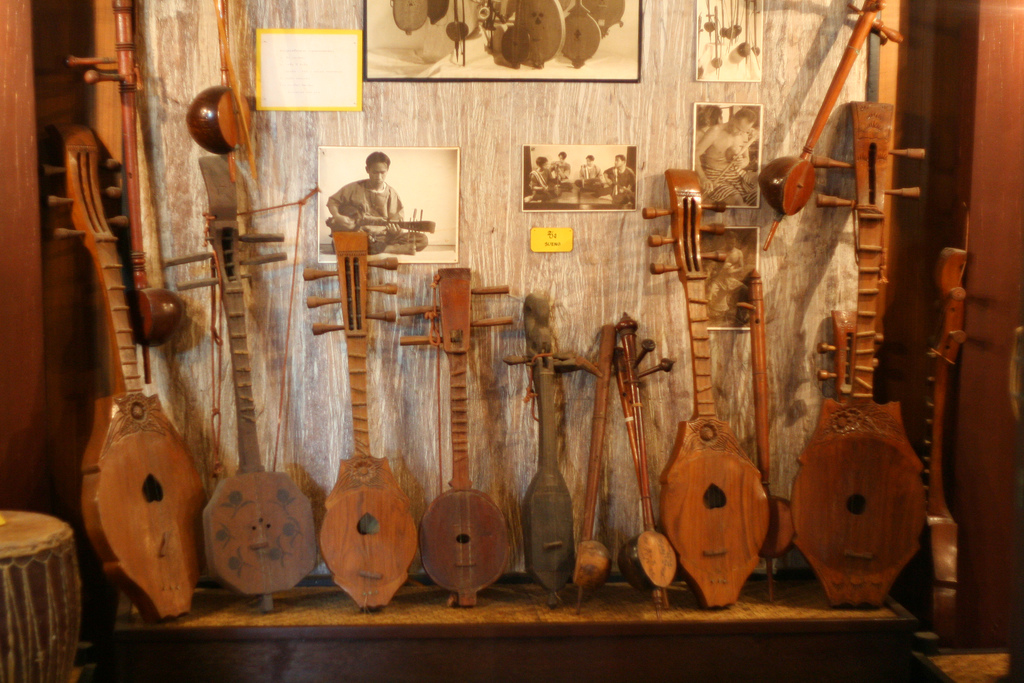
Display of sueng (some with 4 strings and some with 6 strings) in a small museum of musical instruments in Chiang Mai, northern Thailand. Also displayed are several salo (3-stringed fiddles) and a drum.

The sueng (Thai: ซึง, Burmese: ၄ကြိုးထပ်ပို (ဆီုင်), pronounced [sɯ̄ŋ], also spelled seung or süng) Lanna(ᨪᩧ᩠ᨦ)is a plucked fretted lute from the northern (Lanna) region of Thailand. The instrument is made from hardwood and its strings (numbering either four or six and arranged in courses of two) are most often made of steel wire. It has nine bamboo frets.

The sueng is part of a northern Thai traditional ensemble called the salo-so (saw)-sueng ensemble, along with the salo (3-string spike fiddle) and pi so (free reed pipe).

The sueng is similar to the grajabpi (กระจับปี่), an ancient Thai instrument that is used in the classical music of central Thailand.

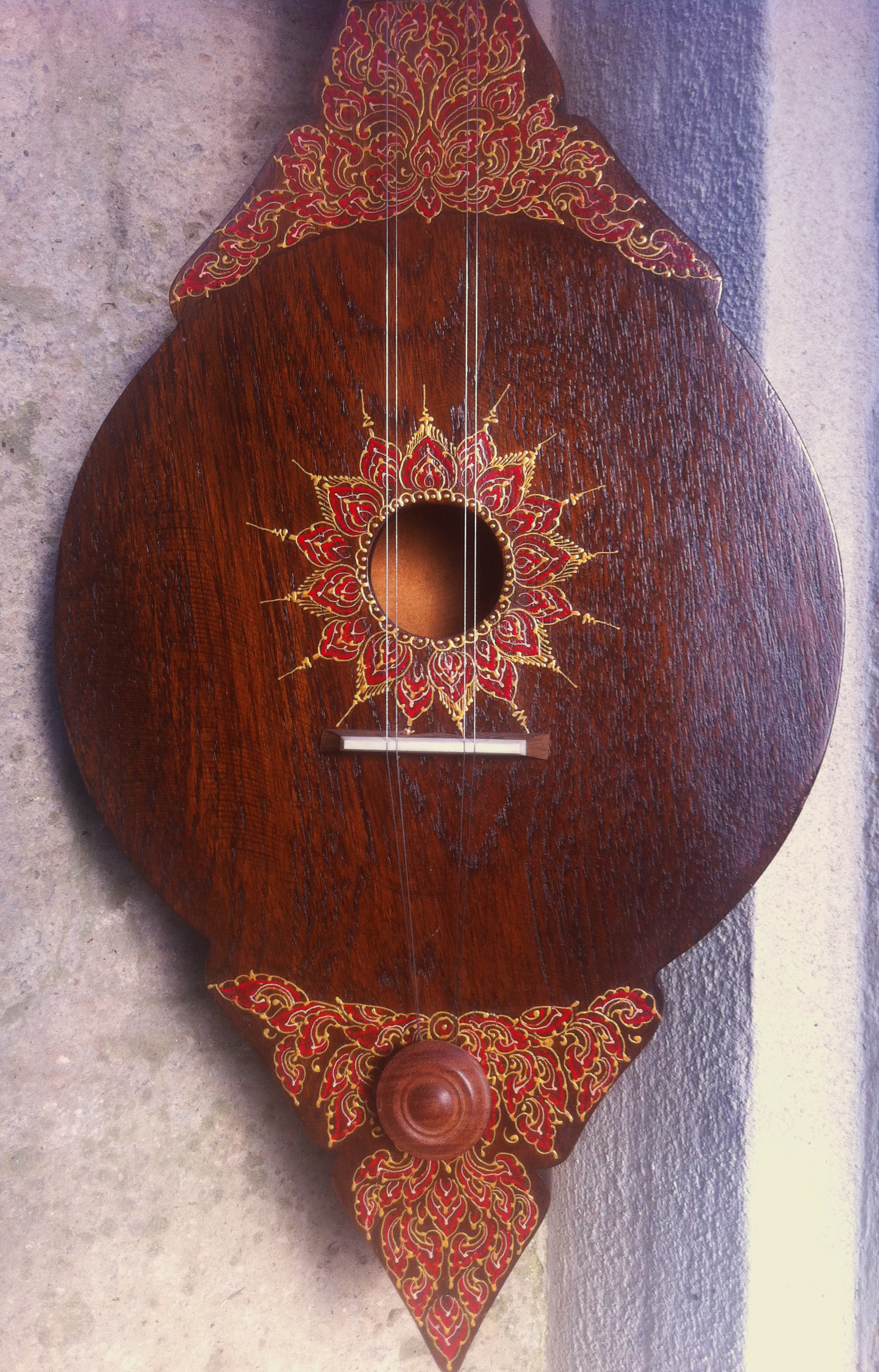
Lai Thai motifs on a Sueng body

== Construction ==
Most suengs are made from a single piece of Jackfruit wood, carved into shape by the artisan. Once carved, a round sound board of the same wood is glued to the instrument. Trapezoid shaped sticks are cut form a bamboo stem and installed as frets. The tuning pegs are then installed: this pegs only have an aesthetic function nowadays, as many modern suengs rely on guitar machine heads for tuning. Eventually the instrument is painted and sometimes decorated with Lai Thai motifs. The bridge can be made from either bone or hardwood. Other woods used for the construction of the sueng are Rosewood and Teak.

== Sound ==
The frets on the sueng are spaced differently than western fretted instruments. In fact, with such arrangement of frets, the instrument plays in the 7-TET temperament, meaning that in one octave the instrument plays seven tones, as opposed to the twelve tones of western music. This temperament is found in traditional Thai music and in other instruments like Ranat.

The playing technique resembles that of the oud where the two strings in the course are tuned to unison and played together as one, with a long soft pick most often made of plastic.

== See also ==
- Traditional Thai musical instruments
- Yueqin
- Lan Na
