= Wot (instrument) =

Type of panpipe used in Laos and Thailand

The Wot (Thai: โหวด; RTGS: wot, pronounced [wòːt] also written as Vot, Vote, Vode, or Wote) is a circular panpipe (pan flute) used in the traditional music of Laos and the Isan region of north-eastern Thailand. It is often a major component in Pong-Lang ensembles.

== History ==
The wot is typically made of bamboo or Ku (a kind of wood) trunk. In general, the sound is generated by blowing. High or low pitches of volume depend on the diameter and the length of wot or, more specifically, it depends on the volume capacity of the wind that goes through the wot. If the capacity is high, it gives a low tone of sound and vice versa.

The standard wot is made of 13 pieces of wood and can make four notes following the Isan note scales, or the minor pentatonic scale in Western music, that can play main music or just a few strokes. The wot generally can create the voice keys up to 6 notes, which can be played for the larger pattern.

Customized wots with seven notes can be played for the full scale, which is usually more difficult than the normal ones.

== Types of Wot ==
The wot characteristics of form classification are:

1. Tail Swing Wot The former wot is a device for recreation which is typically not considered to be a professional musical instrument because it functions more as a toy. In the past, this type of wot includes the core, which is made of bamboo stalk that has grown in a proper time.

2. Circular Wot (general) This wot was improved by Songsak Pratumsin by using the main features of the Tail Wot. It produces only five notes, according to the characteristics of the folk pattern.

3. Panel Wot

4. Tail Wot (used to play for fun and joyful rhythm and easy to play)

This wot is used during the harvest season when the farmers have a popular activity called “Wot Throwing Competition”. The one who throws the wot furthest is the winner. The Tail Wot makes two types of noise which are bass and treble, but does not sort into notes nor adjusts the tone playing music. Thus, it is not considered to be a musical instrument.

== See also ==
- Pan flute
- Thai Music
- Thai Musical Instruments
- Woodwind Instruments
