= Chapei dang veng =

Cambodian two-stringed long-necked guitar

Chapei Dang Veng
String instrument
- Other names: ចាប៉ីដងវែង
- Classification: String instrument

Chapei Dang Veng
- UNESCO Intangible Cultural Heritage
- Country: Cambodia
- Reference: 01165
- Region: Asia and the Pacific

Inscription history
- Inscription: 2016 (11th session)
- List: Need of Urgent Safeguarding

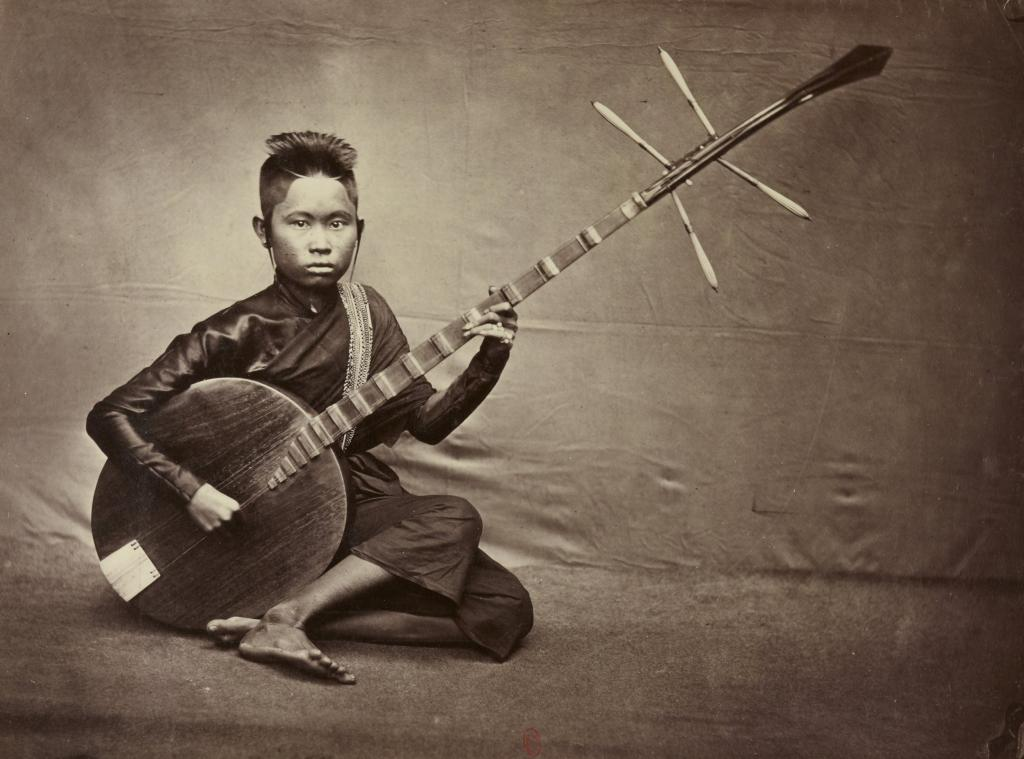
Portrait of a girl with a chapey, 1880. She was a musician at the Cambodian Royal Palace, where the picture was taken.

The Chapei Dang Veng (Khmer: ចាប៉ីដងវែង) or chapey (ចាប៉ី) is a Cambodian two-stringed, long-necked guitar that is usually plucked.

Chapei Dang Veng has two double courses of nylon strings. The top and bottom strings are typically tuned to G and C respectively, with the 12 frets having notes 1 D, 2 E, 3 F, 4 G, 5 A, 6 B, 7 C, 8 D, 9 E, 10 F, 11 G, 12 A.

Chapei Dang Veng also encapsulates in a broader scale a musical tradition closely associated with the life, customs and beliefs of the Cambodian people. The Chapei Dang Veng is often accompanied by singing. Song lyrics range from the educational and a type of social commentary, to satire while incorporating traditional poems, folk tales or Buddhist stories. The tradition is considered to have multiple functions within Cambodian communities, such as safeguarding traditional rituals; transmitting social, cultural and religious knowledge and values; providing exposure to the Old Khmer language; creating a space for social and political commentary; entertaining; connecting generations; and building social cohesion. Apart from musical talent, skills required to be a chapei player include wit, the ability to improvise and be a good storyteller. While performers are generally male, there are no gender restrictions on who can play the chapei. Transmitted orally within families and informal master-apprentice relationships, today the art form is practised by few performers and even fewer masters exist. The Khmer Rouge regime severely affected the bearer population and disrupted transmission of the practice with long-term implications as communities now face the prospect of a tradition that could potentially disappear.

Chapei Dang Veng has been inscribed as World Intangible Heritage in 2016.

== See also ==
- Krachappi
