= Salo (instrument) =

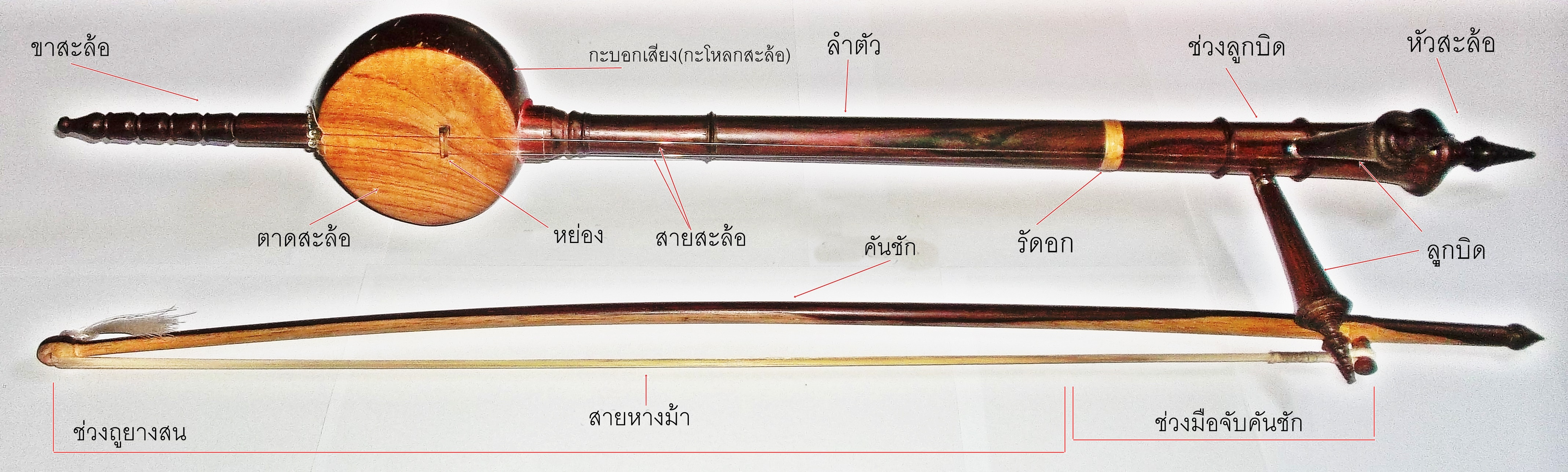
Salo (สะล้อ)

Salo (สะล้อ), rear view, showing the sound hole and the neck of the instrument going through the sound-box, a feature of the larger spiked-lute family.

The salo (Thai: สะล้อ; also known as saw lo or salaw) is a traditional Thai two- or three-stringed spike fiddle native to the Lanna culture of northern Thailand. It is characterized by a small cylindrical resonator, often made from a coconut shell, a supporting neck, and a separate horsehair bow. It is used both as a solo instrument and the leading instrument in folk ensembles, most notably in the Salo Saw Sueng. The salo comes in three sizes; small, medium, and large, each with a distinct role within the ensemble. It is often played alongside the Lanna flute, to convey emotional expression and imitate human voice. The salo is a delicate instrument, as the type of surface it rests on during performance can affect its tone.

== Etymology ==
There is no clear evidence identifying the origin of the word salo. However, it is generally believed to share the same roots as the Saw from Central Thailand. This assumption is based on the variations of the word salo in Lanna script. Such as Traw, Traw-tho, or Talaw, which likely evolved into the name salo.

Across Southeast Asia, there are many different names for a similar bowed instrument, including tro or trua in Cambodia, and tayo in Myanmar. The word itself might come from saaz of Kasmir or sarinda, and sarangi, which is the bowed lute of India

== History ==
The salo can be traced back to the Lanna Kingdom (13th-18th centuries). It comes from interactions between indigenous communities of Tai and Mon-Khmer groups. The earliest appearance is from the inscription at Wat Phra Yuen in Lamphun province (1370 CE). The inscription shows depiction in ceremonial context, along with percussion and gong instruments. During the 19-20th century the salo went through refinements due to the absorption of Lanna into the Siamese state. Under the reign of Princess Dārā Ratsamī, structural improvements were made to enhance durability and quality. By the early 20th century, the instruments were standardized and performed in ensemble and formal dance. After World War II, the strings changed from silk to metal to improve sound and durability. To support commercial music production and the expanded role in ensemble performance.

== Construction ==
1. Kalong (Resonator): The body of the instrument, made from a coconut shell with a rear opening designed to amplify and project sound.
2. Khop Salo (Bridge): A wooden support positioned on the front of the body that elevates and holds the strings in place.
3. Tat Salo (Soundboard): A thin wooden plate that seals the front face of the coconut resonator.
4. Sai Salo (Strings): Two or three metal wires that produce musical tones through vibration when bowed.
5. Lao Salo (Neck): The central shaft or backbone of the instrument, typically carved from a durable hardwood.
6. Rat-ok (Binding): A cord or loop that bundles the strings and fastens them to the upper section of the neck.
7. Lak Salo (Tuning pegs): Wooden pegs used by the musician to adjust string tension and set the pitch.
8. Ka Salo (End pin): A pin at the base of the resonator that supports the instrument against the floor or the player's leg during performance.
9. Kong Salo (Bow): The playing tool, constructed from a curved piece of bamboo or hardwood.
10. Sai Kong (Bow hair): Traditionally made from approximately 30 strands of horsehair, though modern versions often utilize nylon for increased durability.

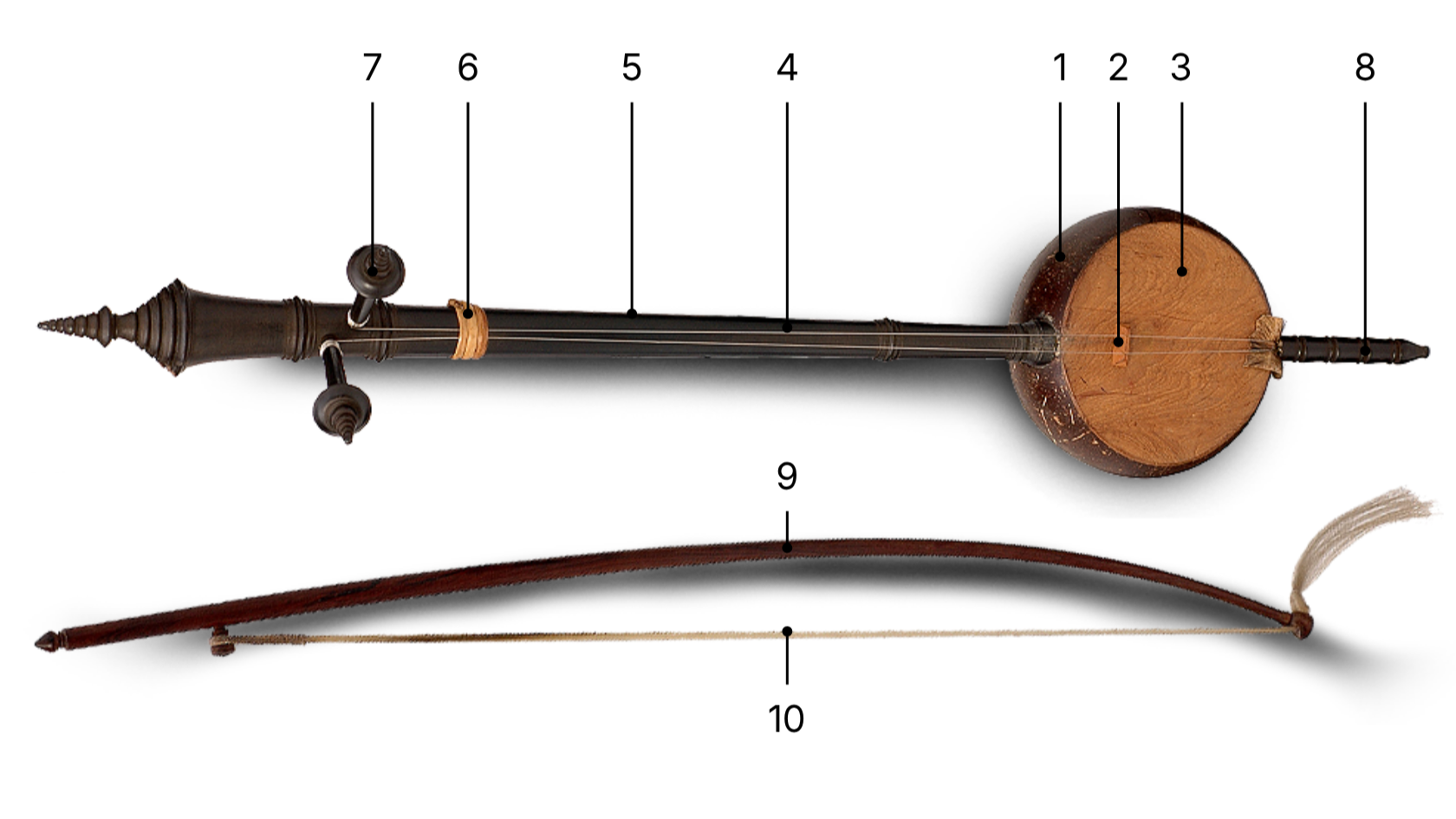
10 essential components of Salo

== Playing technique ==
The Salo is played using three primary bowing styles: pushing the bow out, pushing it in, or a combination of both. When a musician pushes or pulls the bow, it typically produces one note at a time. However, the combined technique allows the player to perform multiple notes in a single, smooth movement. While these methods are similar to those used for other Thai fiddles like the Saw-u or Saw-duang, the Salo is physically unique because its bow is positioned entirely outside the strings.

Because the bow is on the outside, the player must hold and move the instrument in a specific way. While the left hand supports the neck, the player uses a slight tilting or side-to-side movement to bring either the high or low string into contact with the bow (Kong Salo). At the same time, the fingers of the left-hand press down on the strings to change the pitch. "This coordination between both hands enables the melodic ornamentation characteristic of Lanna musical traditions."

== Cultural significance in the Lanna culture ==
Lanna music is a component of Northern Thai cultural identity, serving various roles in both religious and social contexts. Historically, percussion-heavy Pat-kong ensembles (comprising gongs and xylophones) were used for formal and sacred Buddhist ceremonies, while Salo-Saw-Sueng string ensembles were primarily used for private entertainment and to accompany Saw (folk singing). In these contexts, the music functioned as a medium for social communication and community engagement. Scholars have noted its role in the "Lanna Renaissance," where traditional music has been used to promote regional heritage in response to cultural globalization.

In the contemporary era, the genre is often associated with the cultural tourism industry and formal education. It is frequently performed at Khantok dinner presentations, where it serves as a representation of Northern Thai heritage for visitors. Since 2020, the integration of Salo and Sueng into higher education curricula has shifted the training of musicians from traditional apprenticeship to academic study. This formalization has contributed to the preservation of instruments and created professional opportunities within urban environments (Pitupumnak, 2020).

Current musical practices often involve the combination of traditional Lanna melodies with Western acoustic and pop music styles. This includes the integration of traditional instruments with modern keyboards and guitars, a transition that has moved the music from temples and courts into mass media and commercial venues. These developments have established new career paths for practitioners and have allowed the tradition to persist in modern Thai society.

== Similar Instruments ==
The salo is part of the broader spike fiddle family. It shares similarities with other regional instruments.

In Thailand,

- Saw-u and Saw-duang, a lower-pitched fiddle used in classical ensembles. Commonly played in piphat ensembles. Both are played vertically and use similar bowing techniques, but the saw has the bow attached to the body.

In neighboring countries,

- Erhu (China): A two-stringed spike fiddle played vertically, made with a python-skin.
- Tayàw (Myanmar): A three-string fiddle, often called the Burmese violin
- Sao chi (Laos): A two-string fiddle with a wooden body, sharing similar playing techniques.
- Sarangi (India): A bowed instrument with gut string, but more complex due to its many strings.
- Tro (Cambodia): A two & three -string fiddle with a wooden body, covered with leather or snakeskin

== See also ==
- Traditional Thai musical instruments
- Music of Thailand
