= Klong thap =

Musical instrument

The klong thap (Thai: กลองทับ, pronounced [klɔːŋ tʰáp]) is a goblet-shaped drum used for providing the changes of rhythm and also for supporting rhythm of the Nora (Southern dance drama). Its length is about 40-50 centimeters. The body is made from heartwood of a jackfruit tree that has been carved into a goblet shape. A single drumhead is a thin leather membrane made from langur skin or cat skin, which is attached to the body by cloth strings or rattan strings. The klong thap is almost always played in a pair, with one slightly lower in pitch called luk thoeng and one slightly higher in pitch called luk chap.

== See also ==
- Traditional Thai musical instruments
