= Đàn gáo =

Vietnamese boweled string instrument

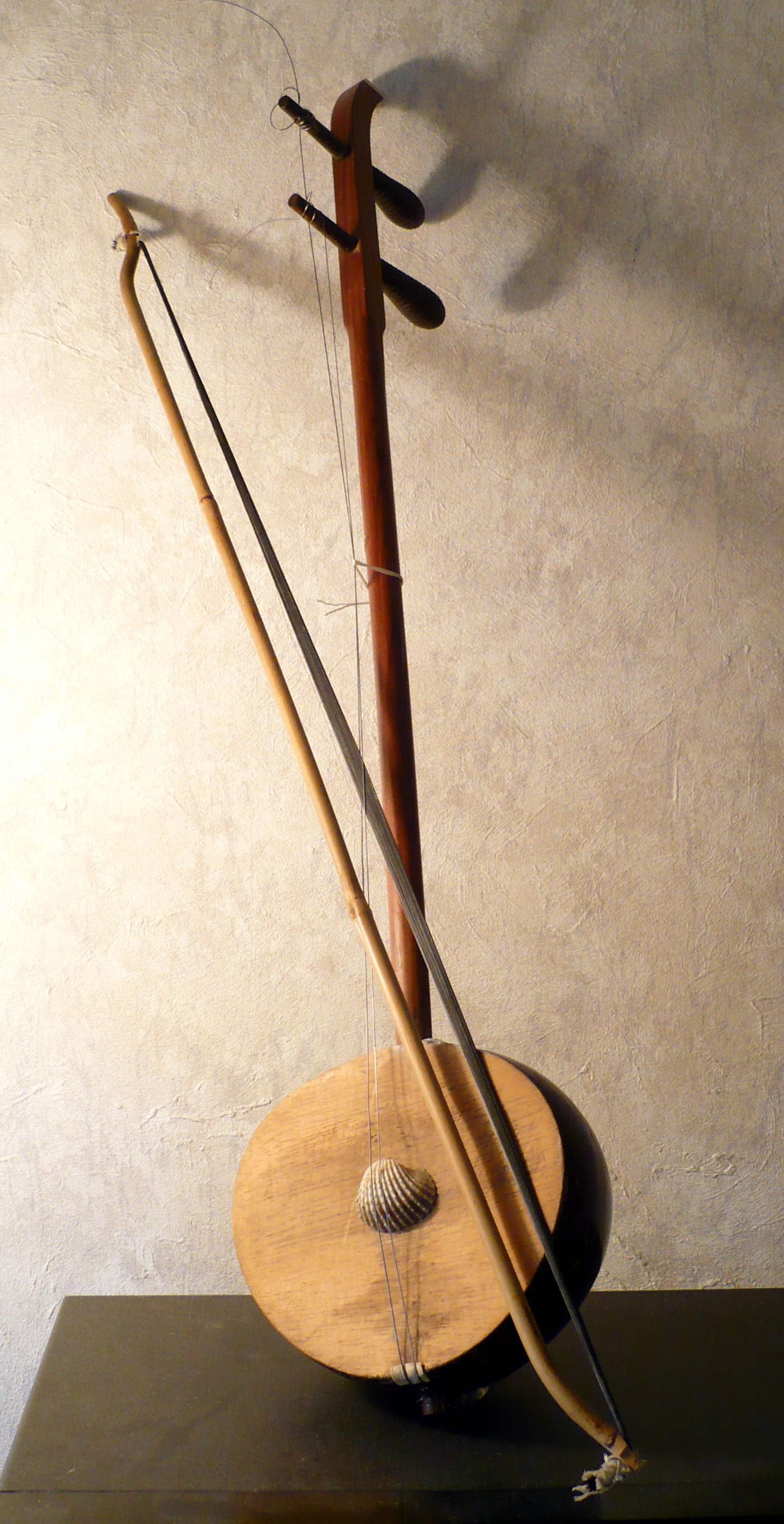

String instrument
- Classification: Bowed string instrument
- Hornbostel–Sachs classification: 321.311 (spike bowed fiddle)

Related instruments
- Banhu, Đàn hồ, Đàn nhị, Yehu, Tro ou

The đàn gáo (chữ Nôm: 彈𣂋) ("coconut shell fiddle") is a bowed string instrument, a part of the traditional Vietnamese orchestra. It is similar to the đàn hồ. The instrument originated from South Viet Nam, and is used in entertainment contexts. It can be played alone, as part of an orchestra, or to accompany cải lương (Vietnamese folk opera). The instrument’s name can be broken down as “đàn” meaning string instrument, and “gáo” literally translated as an aged coconut shell used as a scooper. The đàn gáo is most closely related to the fiddle in Anglo-American culture, and the yehu and banhu in Chinese culture.

== Construction and design ==
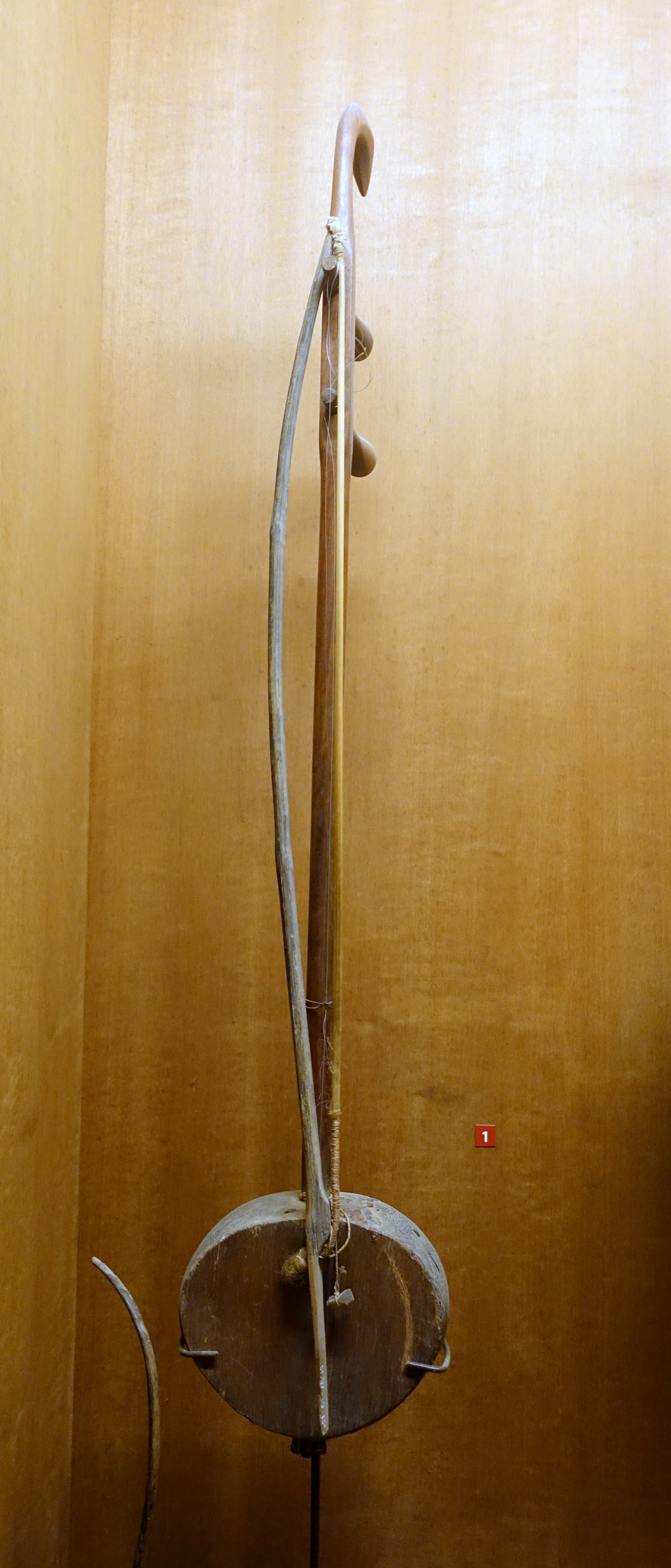
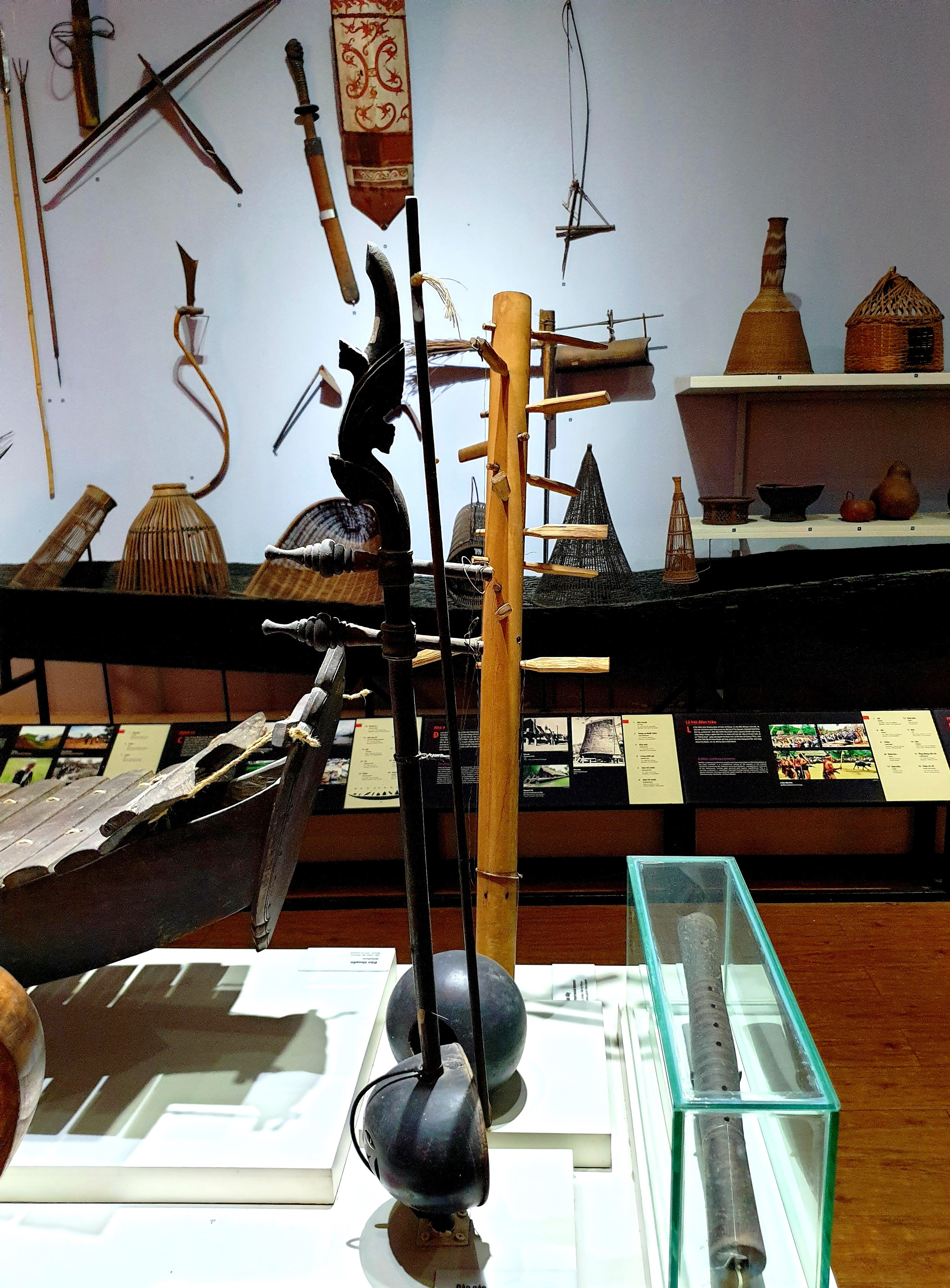
Antique đàn gáo artifacts in the museum

The resonator of the đàn gáo is the coconut shell covered by leather. The neck extends from the coconut shell without frets. The head of the neck bends back and offers string adjusters. There are only two strings for this instrument, and the material is silk, which today can also be substituted with metal. The bow can be made of wood or bamboo, and the strings are also made of silk. By gliding the bow along the strings of the đàn gáo, high and full pitched sounds are produced. The sounds can be played with varying ranges of loudness as well as pitch range as long as the interval between the strings is a perfect fifth.

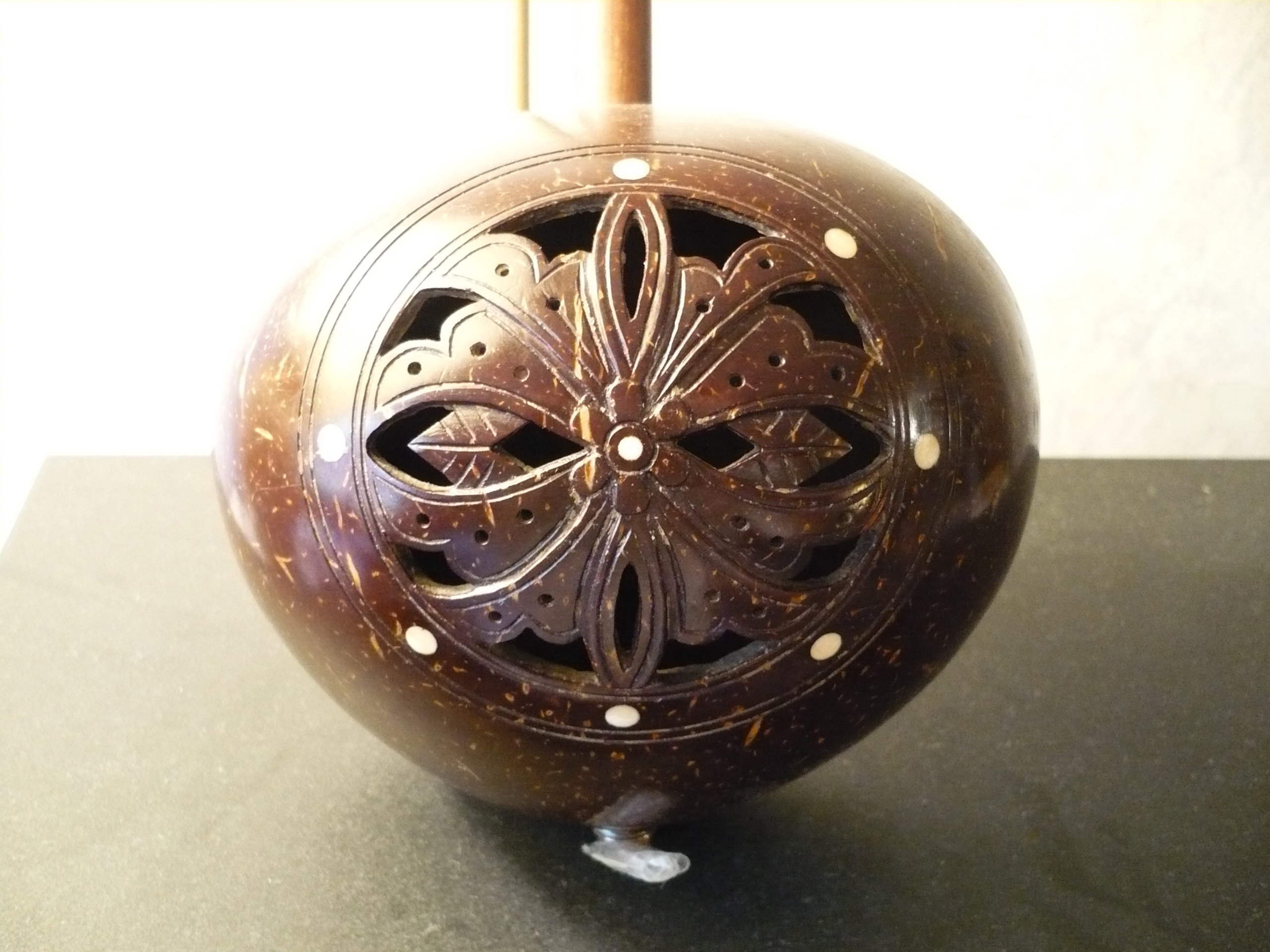
The carved back of the body of a dan gao

The đàn gáo, if not specifically described this way, can also be mixed up for other Vietnamese orchestral instruments- the đàn nhị and đàn ho. These primarily differ in the shape and material of the resonator, and the sound produced.

== See also ==
- Banhu
- Cải lương
- Đàn nhị
- Yehu - Chinese instrument in the huqin family, similarly made with coconut
- Music of Vietnam
