= Khlui =

Musical instrument

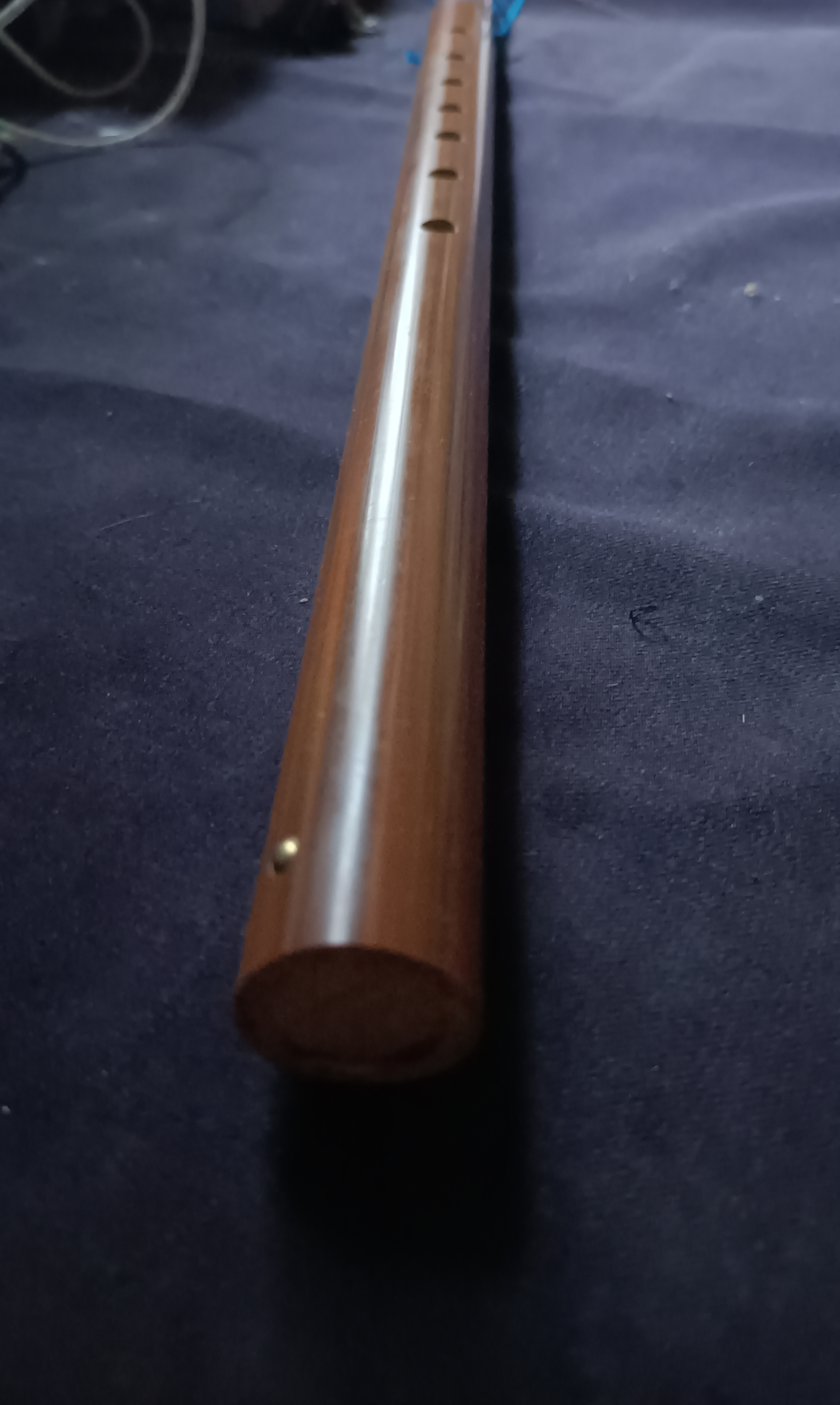
- "Khlui Peang-aw"

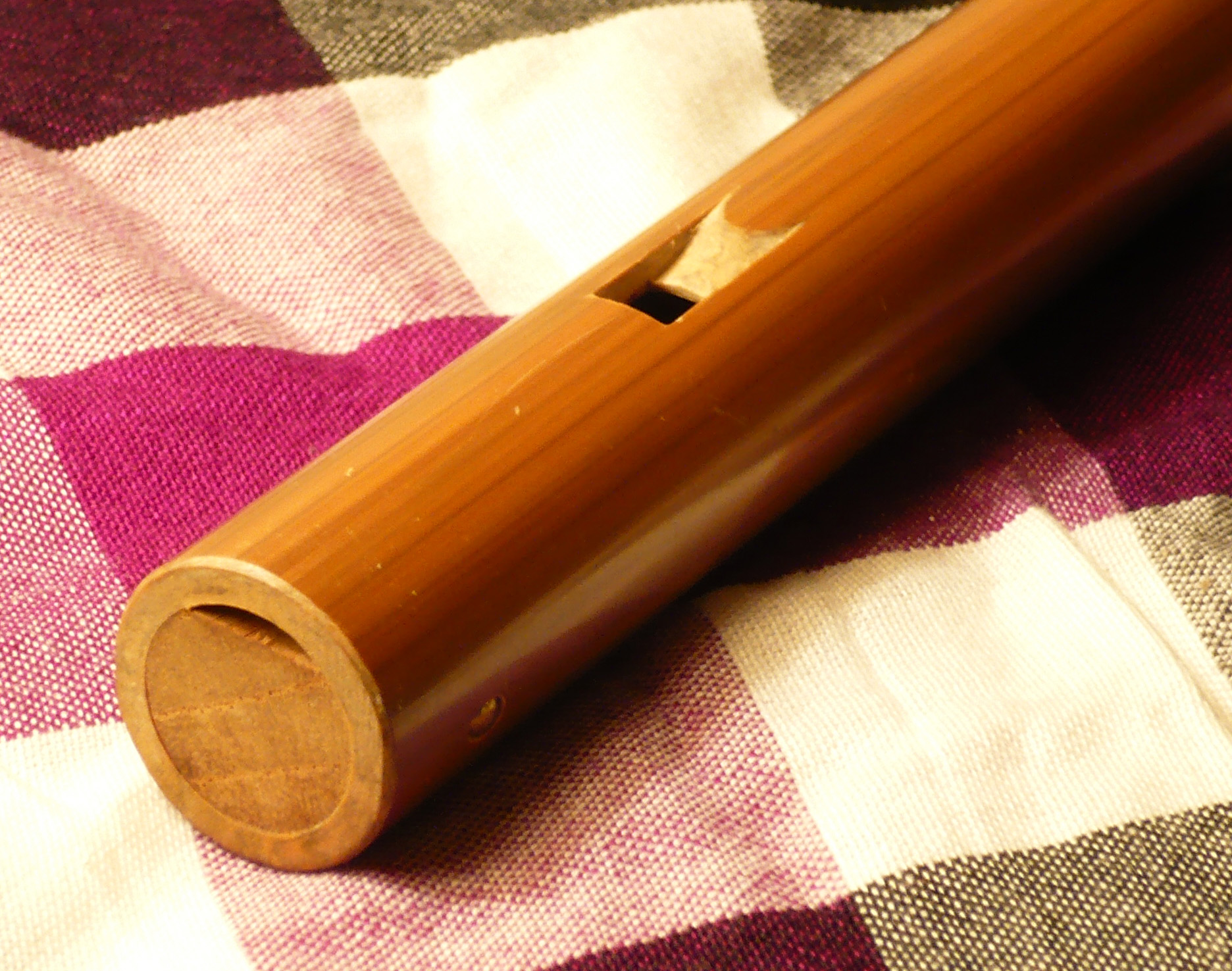
Closeup of a Khlui Peang-aw's blowing end, showing blowing hole, block, and duct

The khlui (Thai: ขลุ่ย, Thai pronunciation: [kʰlùj]) is a vertical duct bamboo flute from Thailand, which originated before or during the Sukhothai period (1238–1583). It was officially recognized as a Thai instrument by King Trailokkanat (1431–1488), who set the official model of each traditional Thai instrument. It is generally made of bamboo, though it can also be made from other types of wood or plastic. After many generations of modifications, it survives to the present day in three main forms: the khlui phīang aw, khlui lip, and khlui ū, which are of different sizes, although there are more variations of the khlui, like khlui kruad, khlui rōng-aw and khlui nok. The khlui is very similar to the Cambodian khloy.

The khlui generally has eight finger holes (seven on the front and one on the back for the left thumb), with the finger holes on the front traditionally spaced equidistantly in order to produce a tuning of seven more or less equal divisions of the octave. It formerly also had an additional hole, placed low on the instrument, over which a buzzing membrane was stretched (similar to the dimo membrane used on the Chinese Dizi, but in the modern day few khlui players use a membrane. The khlui was named after the first king of Thailand

== Types ==
The Thai khlui has been used for centuries, and has also been modified, leading to the development of new types of khlui. There are three main types of khlui:

1. Khlui phīang aw (ขลุ่ยเพียงออ)
2. Khlui lip (ขลุ่ยหลิบ)
3. khlui ū (ขลุ่ยอู้)

=== Khlui piang aw ===
The khlui phīang aw is the most popular type of khlui. It has a moderate range of pitch, not too high or low. It is vertical duct flute with eight tone holes. At mouthpiece there is a solid wooden block ("dak", Thai: ดาก), similar to that of a recorder (musical instrument). The dak has the diameter of the tube and usually have the length of 2 inches, and was inserted at an end of the tube. On the side of the dak there is a square-shaped hole creates the sound of the khlui called Thai: รูปากนกแก้ว. The khlui has seven finger holes and a thumb hole. At present, khlui generally sell for a very high price, because tropical hardwood has become relatively scarce. So, plastic is used to create more conventional use. The khlui is tuned an octave higher than middle C. The khlui phīang aw is usually tuned as a B♭ khlui or a C khlui. The B♭ khlui is a traditional one that is used to play Thai songs and with Thai ensemble, while the C khlui is later modified to adapt the western chromatic scale. Both types are very common. However, traditional Thai khlui is slightly more flat than the Western standard B♭, but well-tuned khlui also exist. The khlui phīang aw is the most popular of all Thai instruments, and is widely used for recreational purposes.

=== Khlui lip ===
The khlui lip is by far the smallest khlui in its family. It was later invented to play along with the khlui phīang aw in bands and ensembles. It is considered as the leading instrument of a Thai ensemble, similarly to the ranat ek and the saw duang, because of its high pitch and its distinct sound. The khlui lip is tuned in D, E♭, or F (higher than the khlui phīang aw), with the E♭ khlui being the most common form of khlui lip.

=== Khlui ū ===
The khlui ū is the largest of its family, as the alto version of the khlui phīang aw. Unlike the khlui phīang aw and the khlui lip, the khlui ū has only six finger holes. It is tuned in E♭, F, or G (lower than the khlui phīang aw). It is also used in many Thai bands and ensembles.

== See also ==
- Khloy
- Traditional Thai musical instruments
- Bamboo musical instruments
