= Phin =

Pear-shaped type of lute

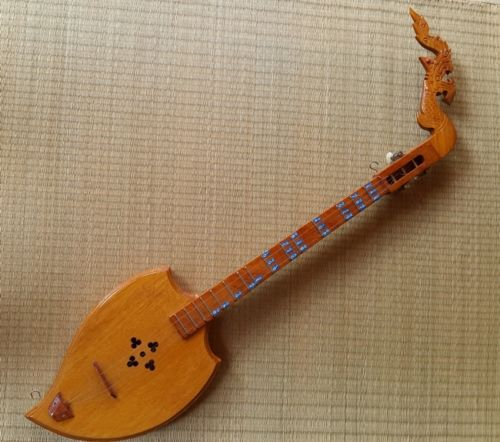
Isan phin.

The phin (Thai: พิณ, pronounced [pʰīn]; Lao: ພິນ, pronounced [pʰīn]) is a type of lute with a pear-shaped body, originating in the Isan region of Thailand and played mostly by ethnic Laotians in Thailand and Laos. It has frets on the neck over which two or three metal strings run that are plucked by a pick held in the right hand while playing. It is often played together with the khene mouth organ in mor lam styled music, as well as luk thung.

== See also ==
- Thai music
