= Saw duang =

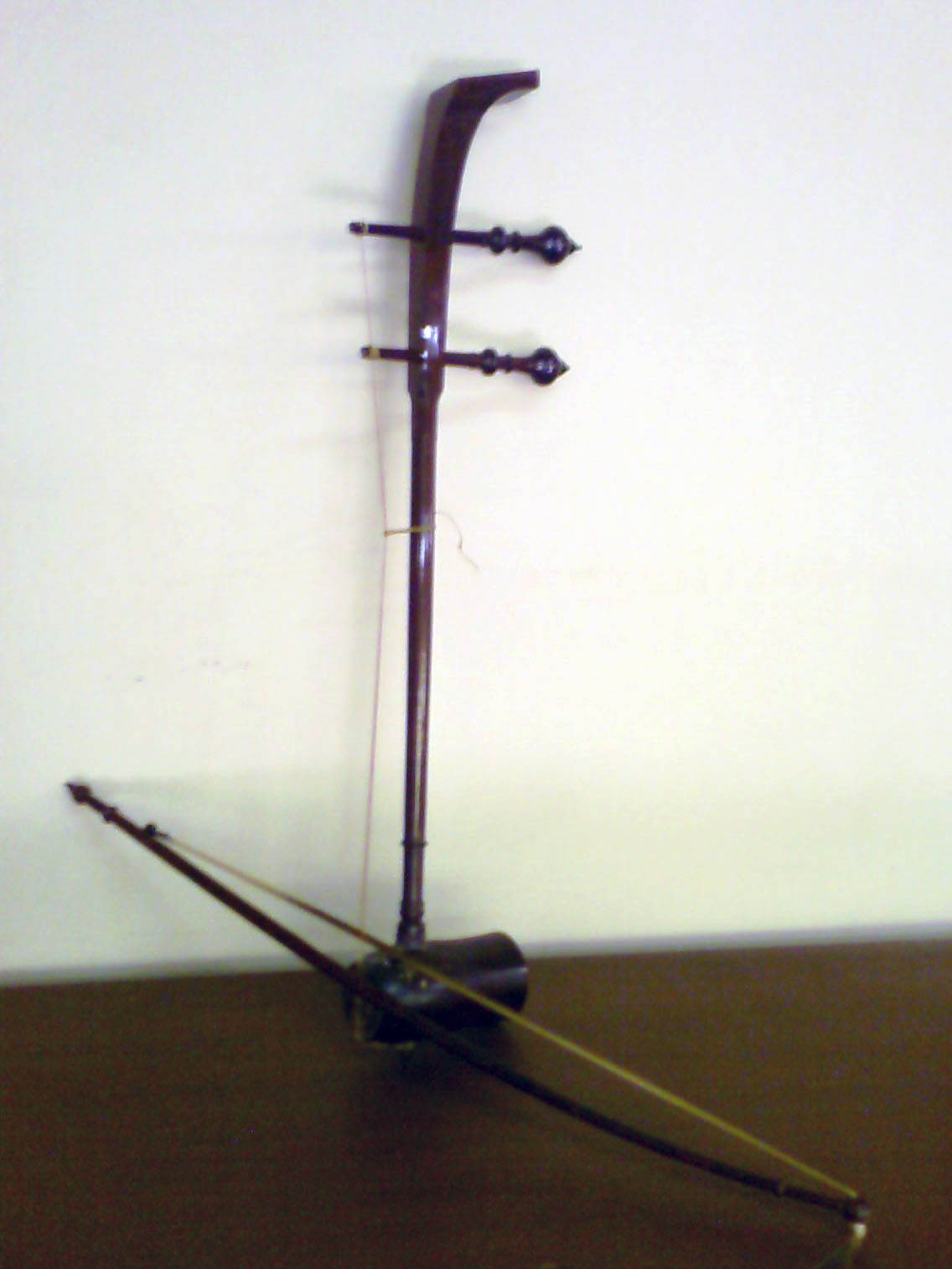
- Other names: ဖွတ်မြီးတယော ဆောဒွမ်
- Classification: String instrument (bowed)

The saw duang (Thai: ซอด้วง, pronounced [sɔː dûəŋ], RTGS: saw duang) is a two-stringed vertical fiddle used in traditional Thai music. The sound is produced by the bow made from horsetail hair which goes between the strings made from silk. The bow has to be tilted to switch from one string to another. The saw duang is light and played vertically on the lap. It creates a bright tone unlike the saw u which produces a mellow sound. Another instrument that is similar to the saw duang is the Chinese stringed instrument called huqin.

== History ==
Thai musical instruments were adopted from Chinese instruments but with adaptations. The variety of musical instruments expanded when the Thai kingdom in the Indo-China peninsula came into contact with India. Later on, Thailand also adopted Western instruments such as the violin and the organ.

The saw duang may have been derived from the huqin of China. The name was given based on its shape which resembles a trap (duang dak yae or ด้วงดักแย้) used by the people of the Northern provinces to catch edible lizards.

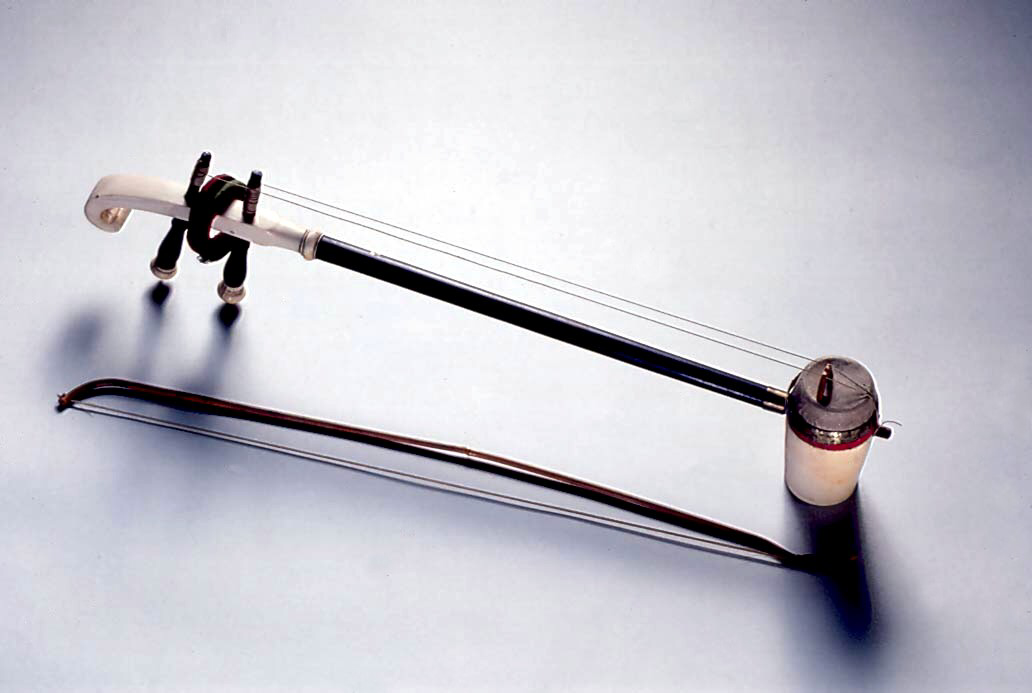
Saw Duang, Thailand, late 19th century at the Metropolitan Museum of Art

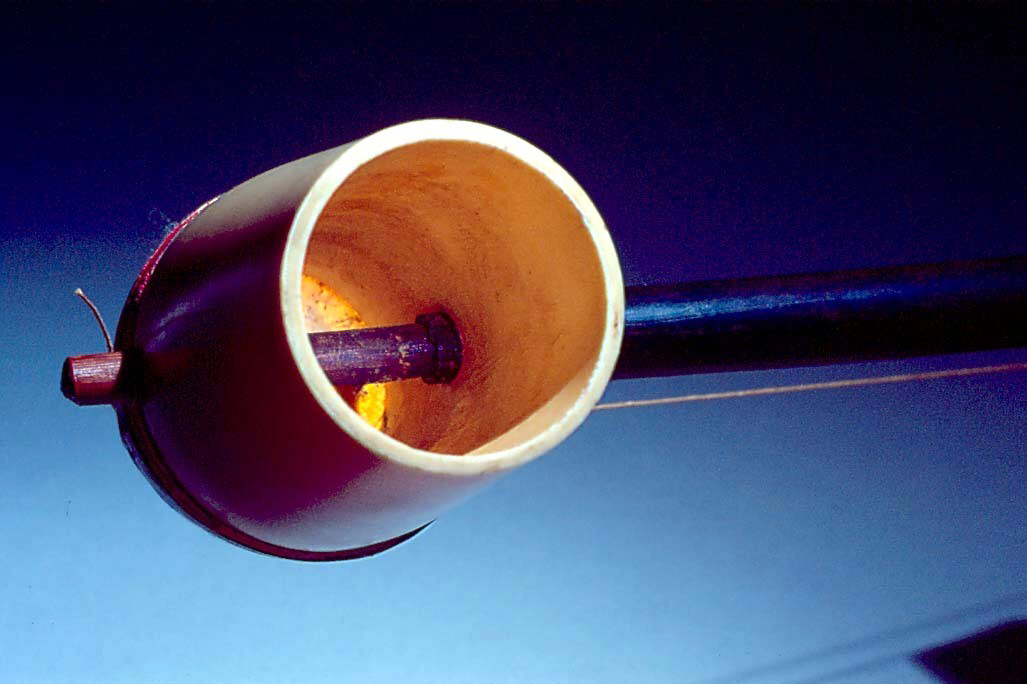
Back of a saw duang fiddle at the Metropolitan Museum of Art

== Structure ==
The saw duang has seven main components:

1. The neck (Thuan Saw) can be made from different kinds of hard wood. The upper part of the neck has a quadrangle shape while the lower part is tapered and inserted into the sound box.
2. The tuning pegs (Luk-bid) face the same direction as the Thuan Saw. They made of wood or ivory and are cylindrical in shape. The low pitch string is attached to the upper peg while the high pitch string is attached to the bottom peg. As in violins, the pegs are twisted to tune the strings.
3. The body has a hollow cylindrical shape made from hard wood or ivory. One side of the body is covered with a piece of stretched snakeskin which expands the vibration from the strings.
4. The cord (Rad-ok) is fastened around the strings at the upper part of the neck. It is used to make the strings tighter. The player presses the string below this cord.
5. The wooden bridge is similar to the ones used in western string instruments. It supports the string and transfers the vibration down to the snakeskin.
6. The bow is made from the same material as the neck. It has a long curved shape like the bow of Baroque violins. The hairs of the bow which are made from horsetail hairs or nylon strings go between the two strings and are fastened at the two ends of the bow.
7. The strings are made from different kinds of materials. Traditionally, they were made from silk but nowadays nylon or brass wires are used instead to make them durable and to create a clearer sound. The big inner string has a lower pitch than the small outer string.

== Use ==
In a traditional string ensemble or Wong Khrueang Sai (วงเครื่องสาย), Saw duang acts as a leader due to its high and clear sound. In recent times, the traditional string ensemble has developed with the addition of Western instruments such as violins and piano. These string ensembles are used in many occasions such as weddings, birthdays, and housewarmings.

It is equivalent to the Cambodian tro sau toch.

== See also ==
- Traditional Thai musical instruments
- Huqin
- Saw u
