= Saw u =

Thai bowed string instrument

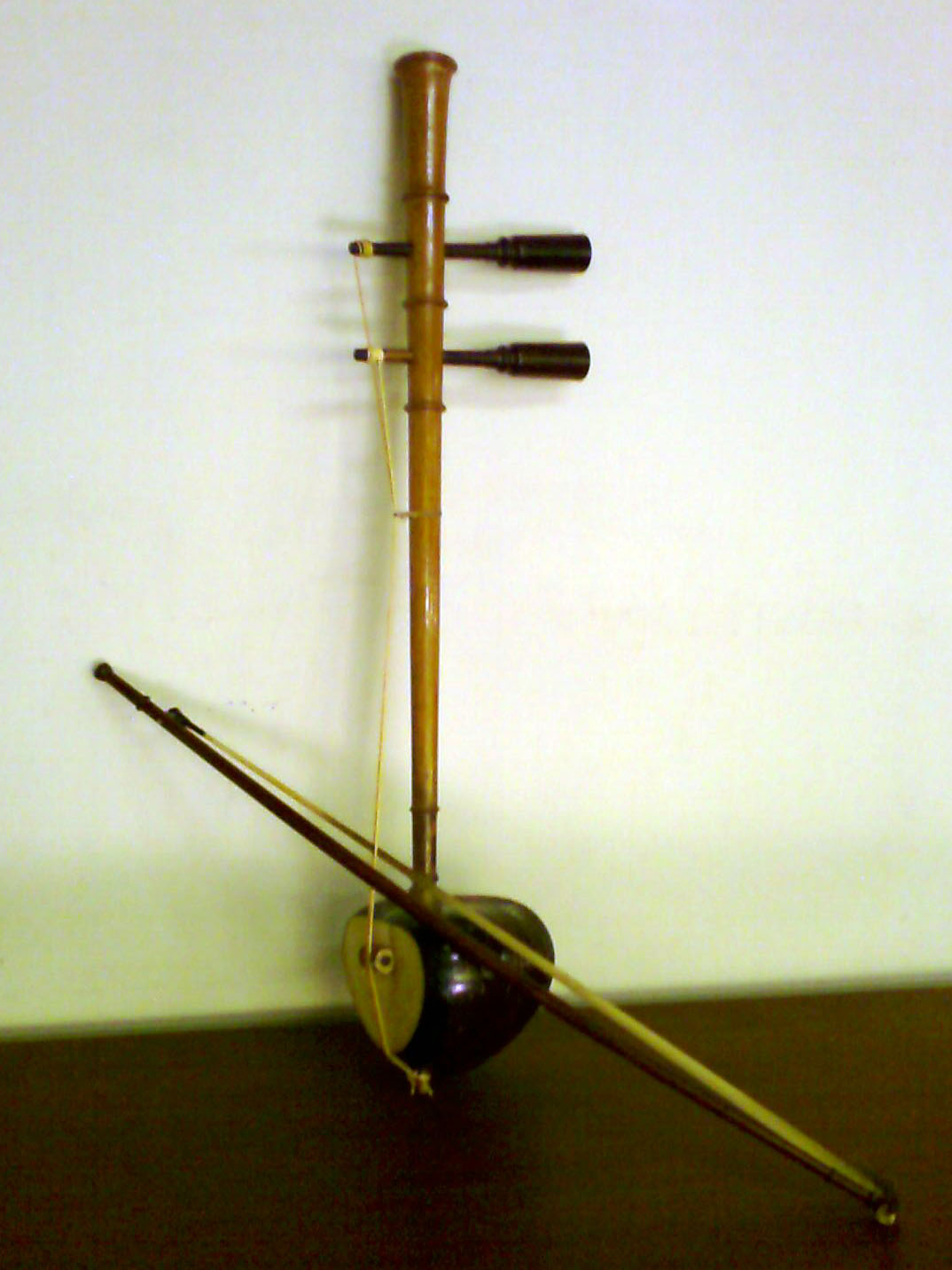
- Classification: String instrument (bowed)

Related instruments
- Tro u

The saw u (Thai: ซออู้, RTGS: so u, pronounced [sɔː ʔûː]; also spelled saw ou) is a Thai bowed string instrument. It has a lower pitch than the saw duang and is the lowest sounding of the saw family.

Reliable evidence shows that pattern of the Saw U was probably taken from the Chinese instrument and it is very similar to a two stringed Chinese instrument called the hu hu. The saw U was invented since the age of the present Bangkok period (c. 1782) or perhaps from the end of the preceding in the age of Ayudya (c.1700 - 1767). By the end of the 19th century, the Saw U was added to the pi-phat-mai nuam ensemble which uses padded playing sticks and the pi phat derk dam ban which is a special pi phat ensemble in a particular form of theater. From the past Saw U was generally played in pi phat ensemble with other accompanying instruments. Thai people call it “Saw U” because of the characteristic sound that Thai people heard from it. The soundbox is made from a coconut shell that is covered on the open front by cowskin. The saw u is held vertically and has two silk strings that are played with a bow. The bow is between the strings and the player tilts the bow to play each string. The bow is made out of horse tail hair like every other bow and needs to have rosin put on occasionally just like a western stringed instrument. The saw u is a very fragile instrument and is played traditionally on the lap sitting down. The saw u can be played as a solo instrument in some cases but is mainly used for the backbone in some ensembles because of its rich, dark, and mellow tone. The saw u performs its best when playing slow to moderate paced melodies. The sound that the saw u makes is more fit for those types of songs rather than fast paced melodies. The morn (bridge) that rests at the bottom is extremely sensitive and drifts over time, causing changes in tone. The saw u is similar to the Cambodian tro u and was developed by the Chinese into the yehu.
