= Traditional Cambodian musical instruments =

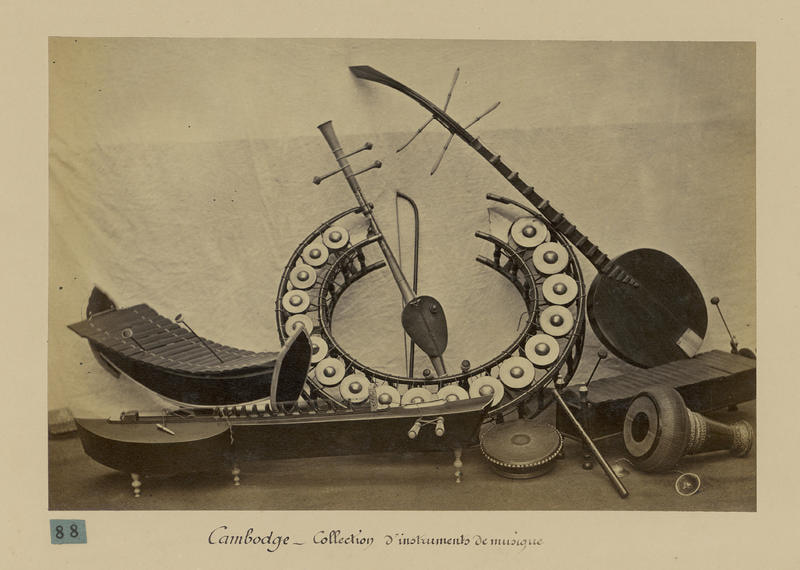
Cambodian musical instruments in the mid 19th century

Traditional Cambodian musical instruments are the musical instruments used in the traditional and classical music of Cambodia. They comprise a wide range of wind, string, and percussion instruments, used by both the Khmer majority as well as the nation's ethnic minorities.

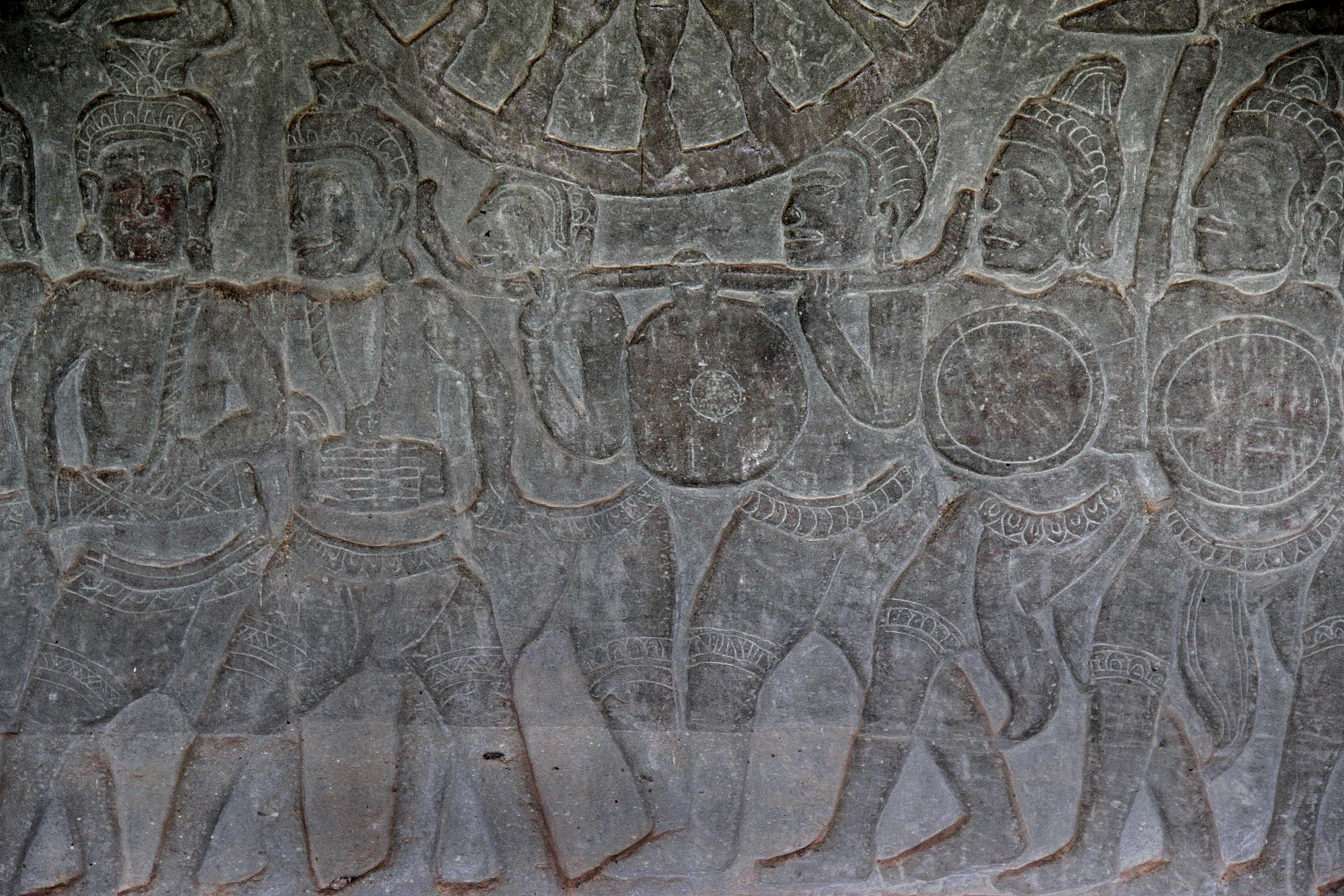
Soldiers carry drums and a shoulder-mounted nipple gong in relief at Angkor Wat.

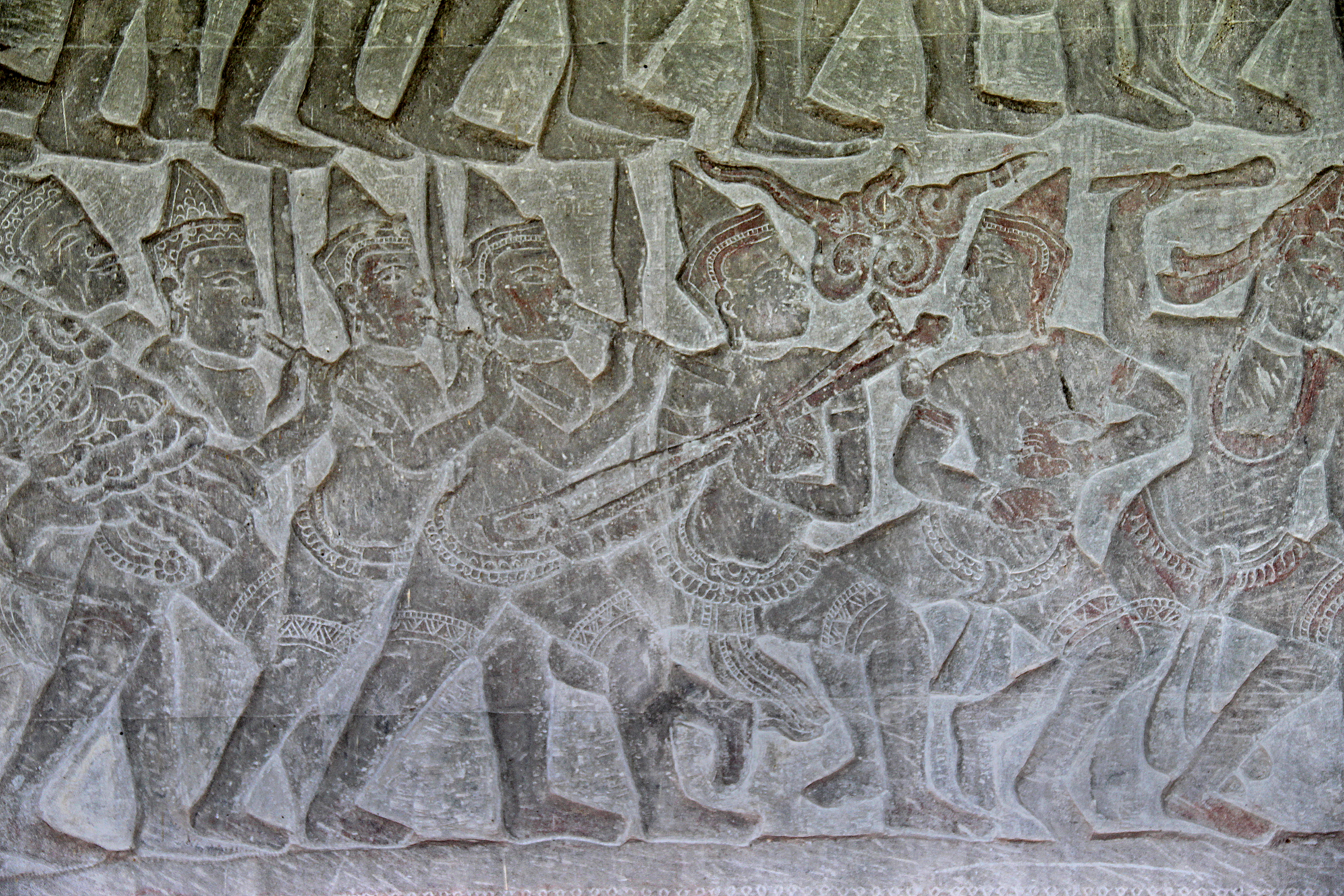
Kse diev at Angkor Wat, North Section, 16th Century.

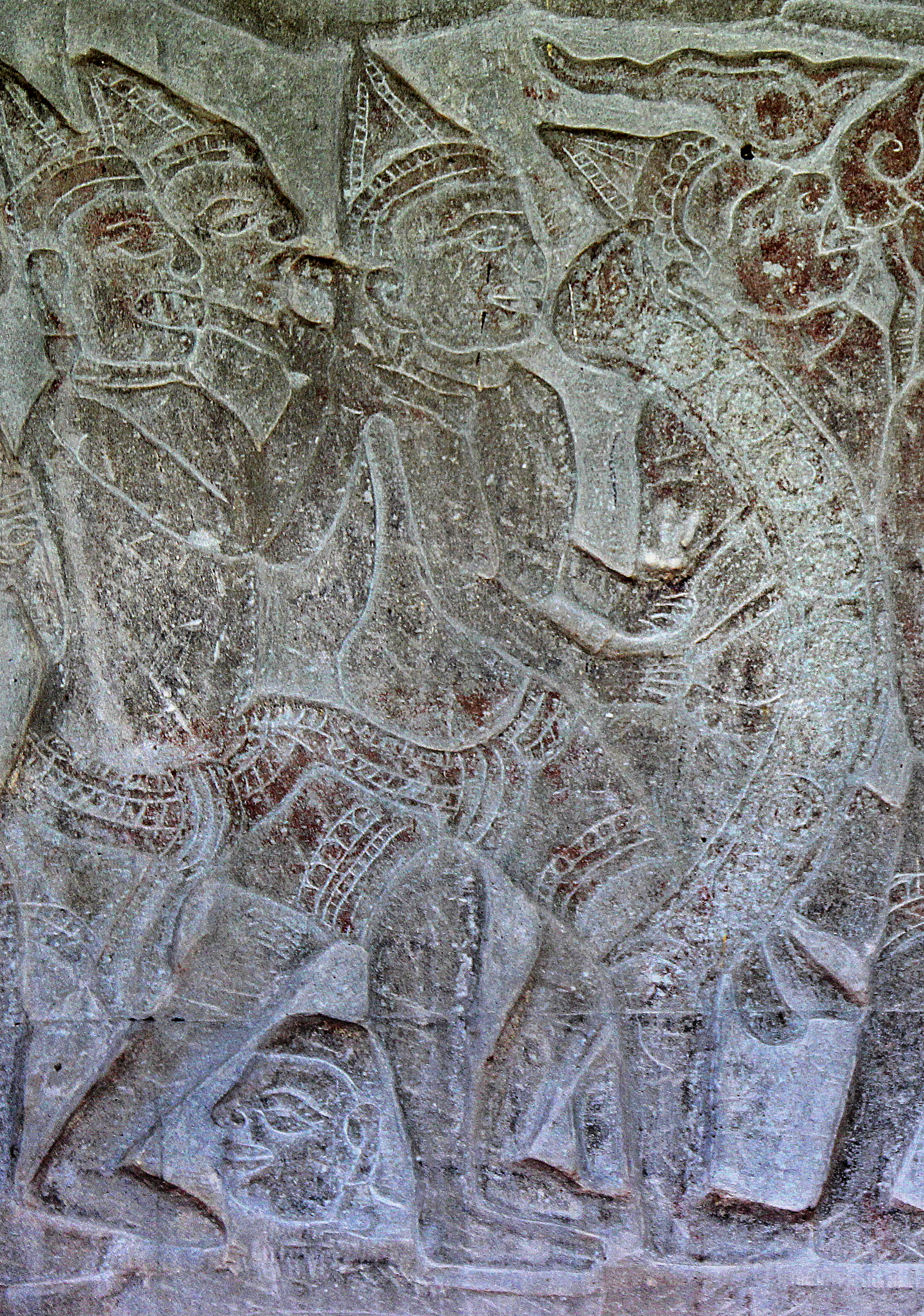
Khmer gong chimes from Angkor Wat.

== Woodwind ==
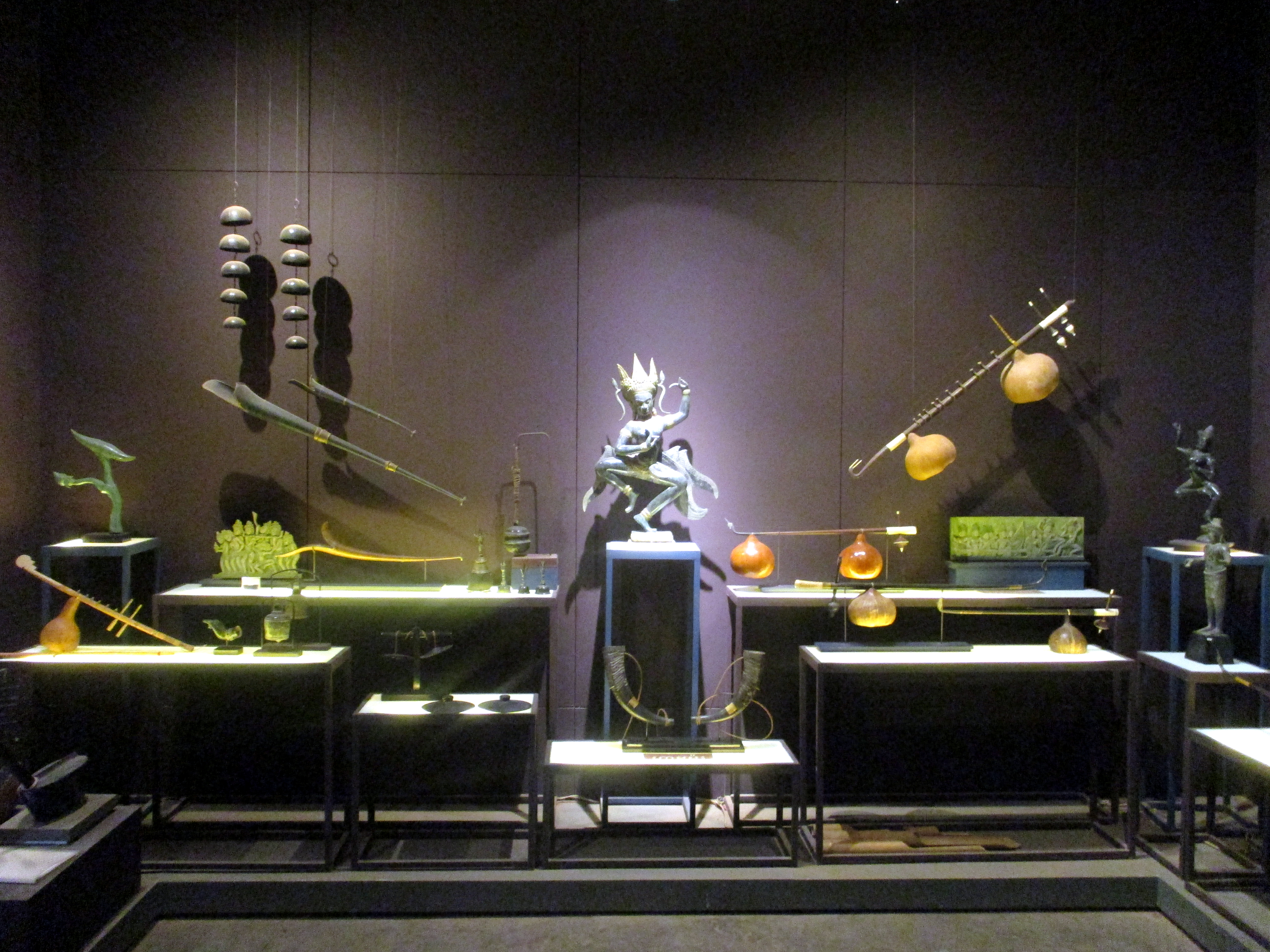
Various Cambodian woodwind and string musical instruments at the "Sounds of Angkor" exhibition in Тheam's Gallery, Siem Reap, Cambodia.

=== Flute ===
- Khloy (Khmer: ខ្លុយ) - vertical duct flute made of bamboo, hardwood, or plastic, with buzzing membrane
  - Khloy ek - smaller in size
  - Khloy thom - larger in size

=== Free-reed ===
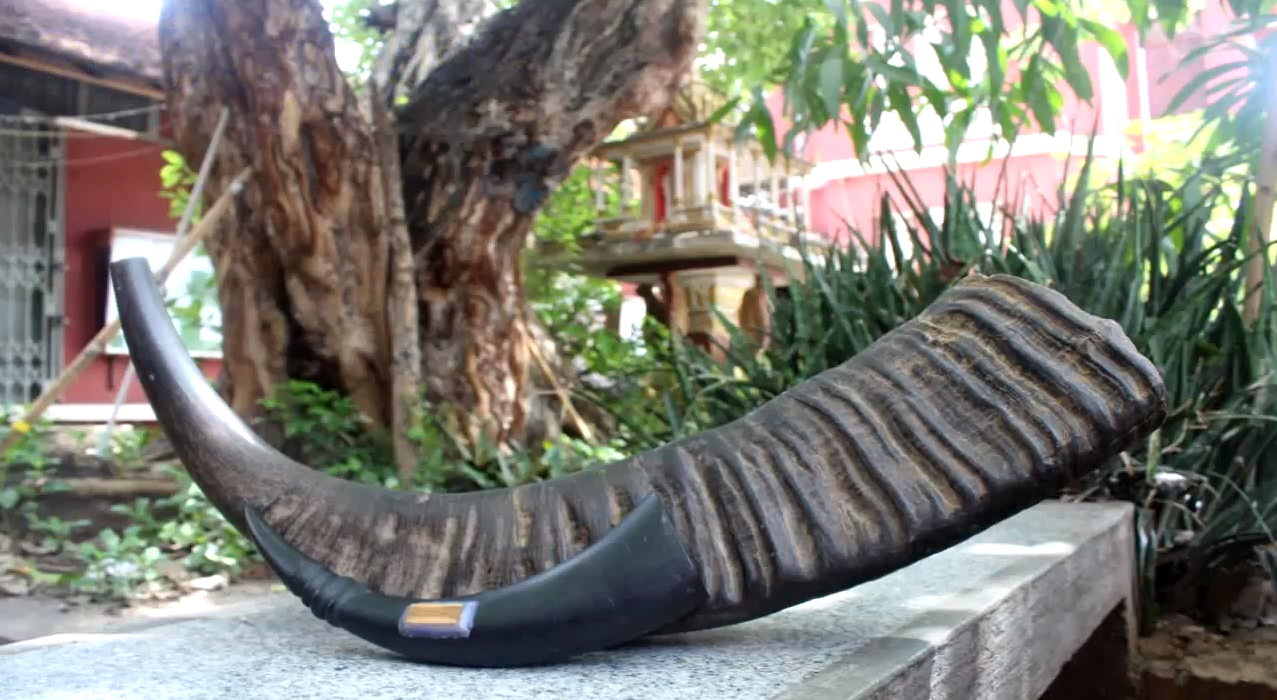
A Cambodian musical instrument called a Sneng ស្នែង, made from a cow's horn, sits in front of a water buffalo horn. The reed where the instrument is played is visible on the side of the horn.

- Sneng (Khmer: ស្នែង) - water buffalo or ox horn with a single free reed^{photo}
- Pey pok (Khmer: ប៉ីពក) - free-reed pipe^{photo}
- Ploy (Khmer: ព្លយខ្មែរ) (also called m'baut) - mouth organ with gourd body and five to seven bamboo pipes; used by Mon-Khmer-speaking upland ethnic minorities
- Ken/khaen (Khmer: គែន) - free-reed mouth organ used in northwestern Cambodia
- Angkuoch (Khmer: អង្គួច) (also called kangkuoch) - jaw harp made of bamboo or metal

=== Quadruple reed ===
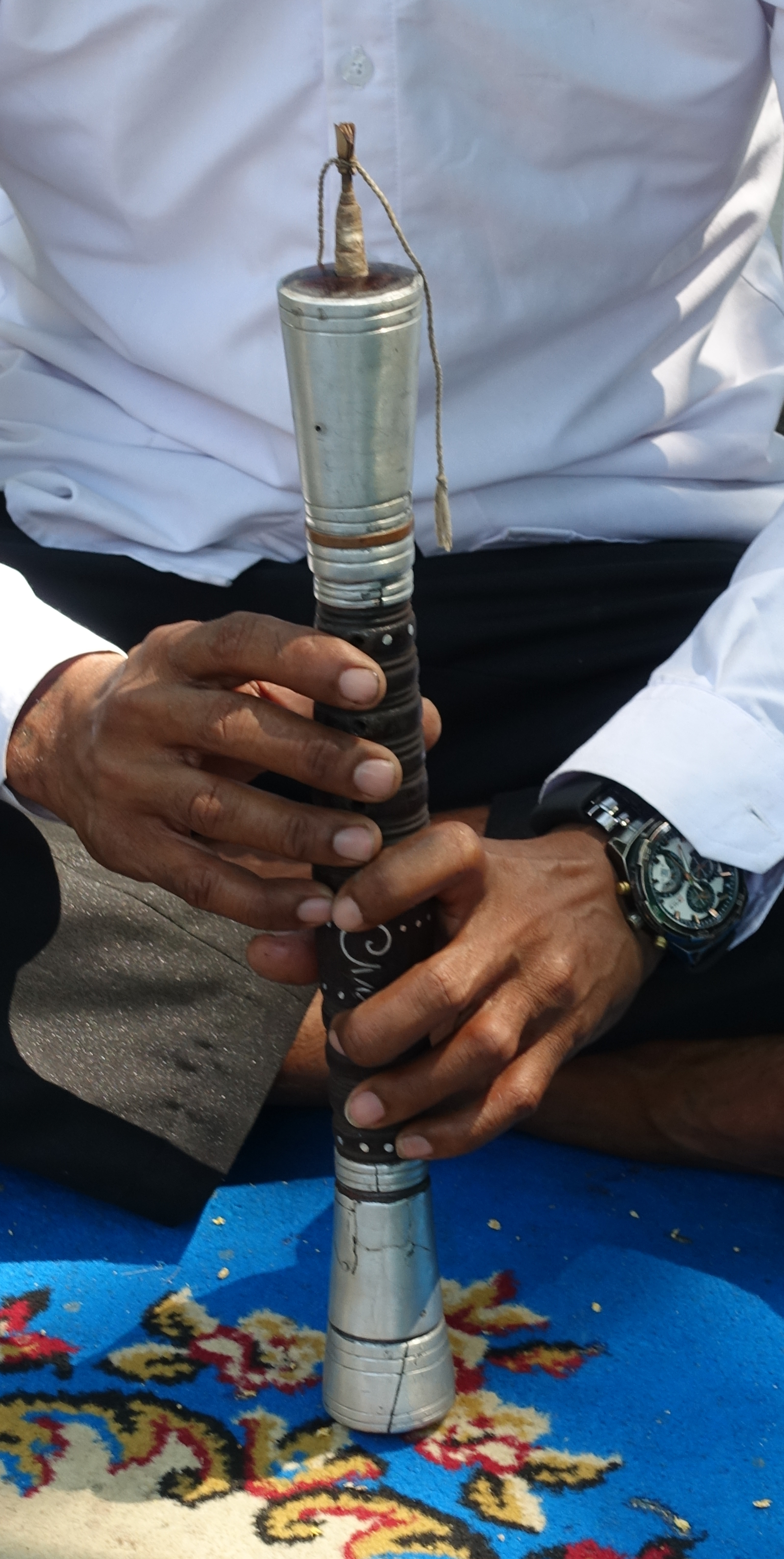
- Sralai instrument, Siem Reap, 2024
  Sralai (Khmer: ស្រឡៃ) - quadruple-reed oboe
  - Sralai toch (Khmer: ស្រឡៃតូច) - small quadruple-reed oboe
  - Sralai thom (Khmer: ស្រឡៃធំ)- large quadruple-reed oboe
  - Sralai chey (Khmer: ស្រឡៃជ័យ), also called sralai klong khaek (Khmer: ស្រឡៃក្លងខែក) or sralai Chvea (Khmer: ស្រឡៃជ្វា), historically played during triumphal ceremonies and traditional Cambodian martial arts matches such as kun Khmer/pradal serey or bokator
  - Sralai Trai Leak (Khmer: ស្រឡៃត្រៃលក្ខណ៍) or sralai Toam Ming (Khmer: ស្រឡៃទាំមីង), used in Kantoam Ming (or Trai Leak) funeral ensembles in the Siem Reap region
- Pey ar (Khmer: ប៉ីអៃ) (also spelled beyaw, and also called bey prabauh) - oboe with cylindrical bore

=== Horns ===
- Saing - conch horn

=== Other ===
- Slek - tree leaf used as a wind instrument

== String ==
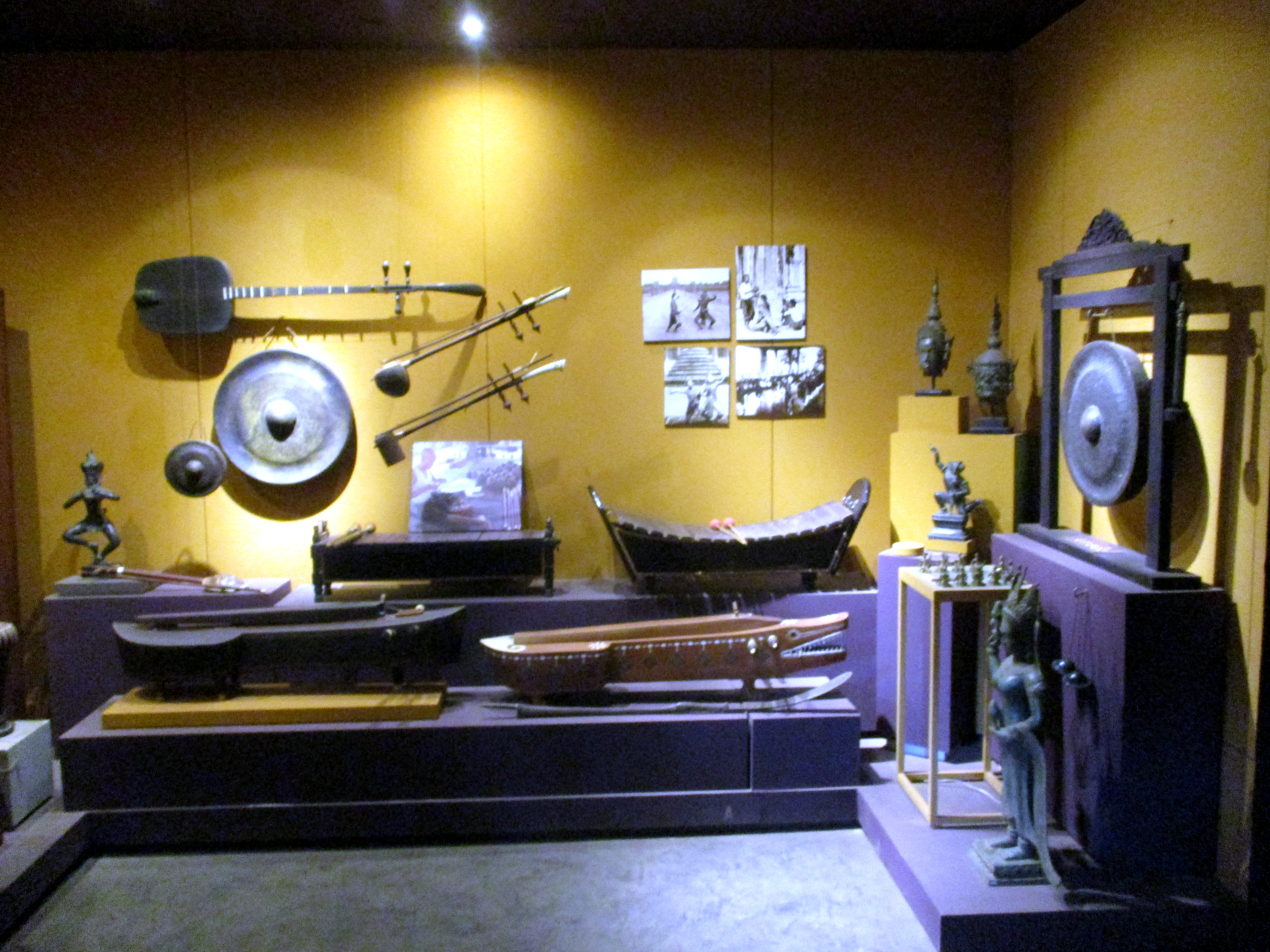
Various Cambodian string musical instruments at the "Sounds of Angkor" exhibition in Тheam's Gallery, Siem Reap, Cambodia.

=== Bowed ===
- Tro (ទ្រ) - fiddle
  - Tro Khmer (ទ្រ ខ្មែរ) - three-string vertical spike fiddle with coconut shell body; used in classical music
  - Tro che (ទ្រឆេ) - high-pitched two-string vertical fiddle, with face covered with snakeskin
  - Tro sau toch (ទ្រសោធំ តូច) - two-string vertical fiddle with hardwood body; used in classical music
  - Tro sau thom (ទ្រសោធំ) - two-string vertical fiddle with hardwood body; used in classical music
  - Tro u (also spelled tro ou) (ទ្រអ៊ូ) - lower two-string vertical fiddle with a coconut shell body, with face covered with calfskin or snakeskin; used in classical music^{photo}

=== Plucked ===
- Chapei dong veng (ចាប៉ីដងវែង) - plucked fretted lute
- Kong ring - bamboo tube zither, can play the drum's part
- Krapeu (also called takhe) - crocodile-shaped fretted floor zither with three strings
- Kse diev (Khmer: ខ្សែដៀវ) or khse mhoy (Khmer: ខ្សែមួយ) - chest-resonated stick zither)^{photo}
- Pin - Cambodian harp, ancient instrument reborn in modern times

=== Struck ===
- Khim (ឃឹម) - hammered dulcimer

== Percussion ==
=== Drums ===
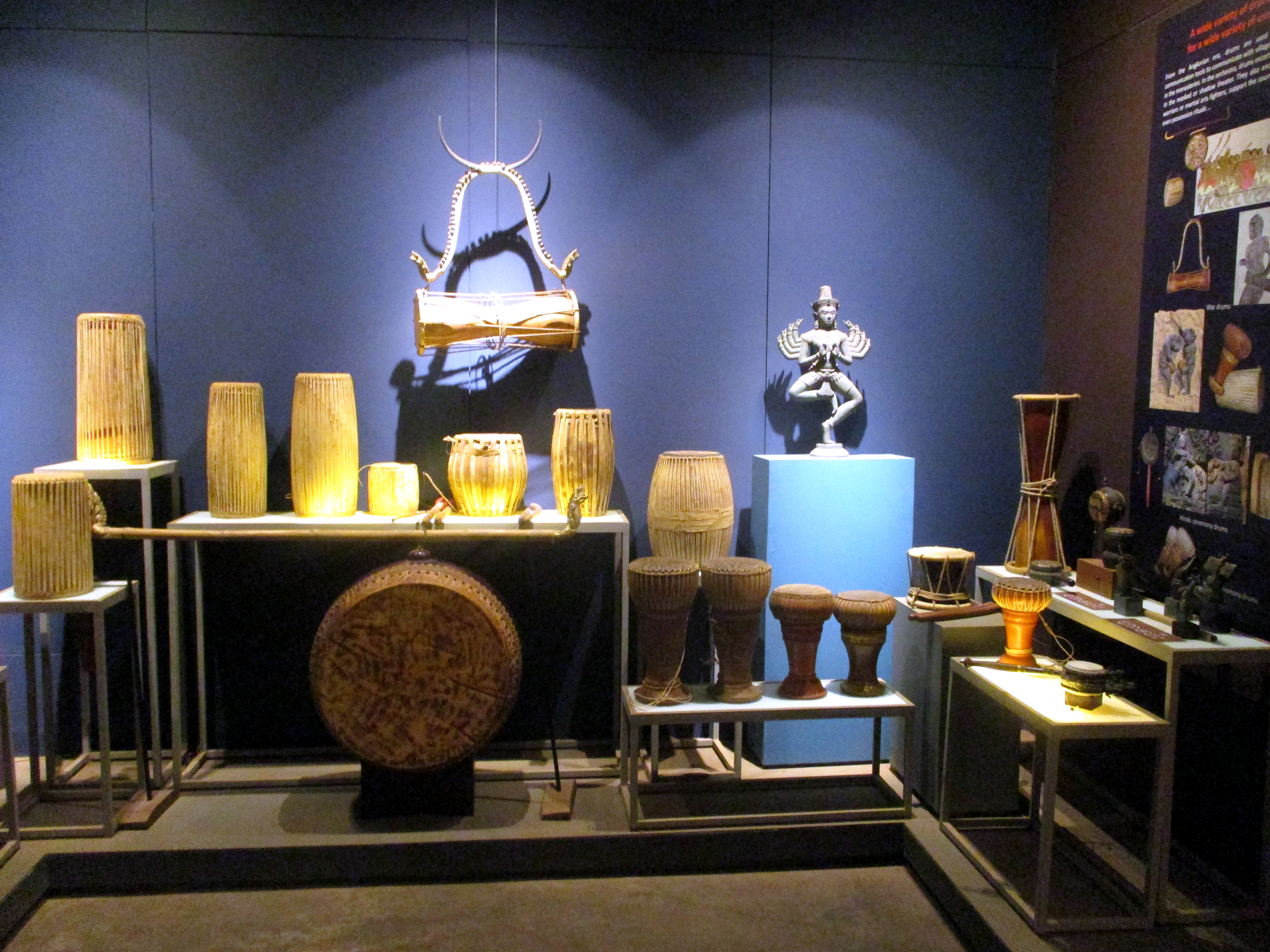
Various Cambodian drums at the "Sounds of Angkor" exhibition in Тheam's Gallery, Siem Reap, Cambodia.

- Sampho (សម្ភោរ)- barrel drum, played with the hands
- Skor (also spelled sko) - long skor drum
  - Skor thom (ស្គរធំ)- pair of large barrel drums, played with sticks
  - Skor yike (ស្គរយីកេ) - flat skor drum, played with hands and used in Yike dance drama
- Thon, skor daey, and skor arak - goblet-shaped drums, played with the hands^{photo}
- Rumana - frame drum, played with the hands

=== Gong chimes ===
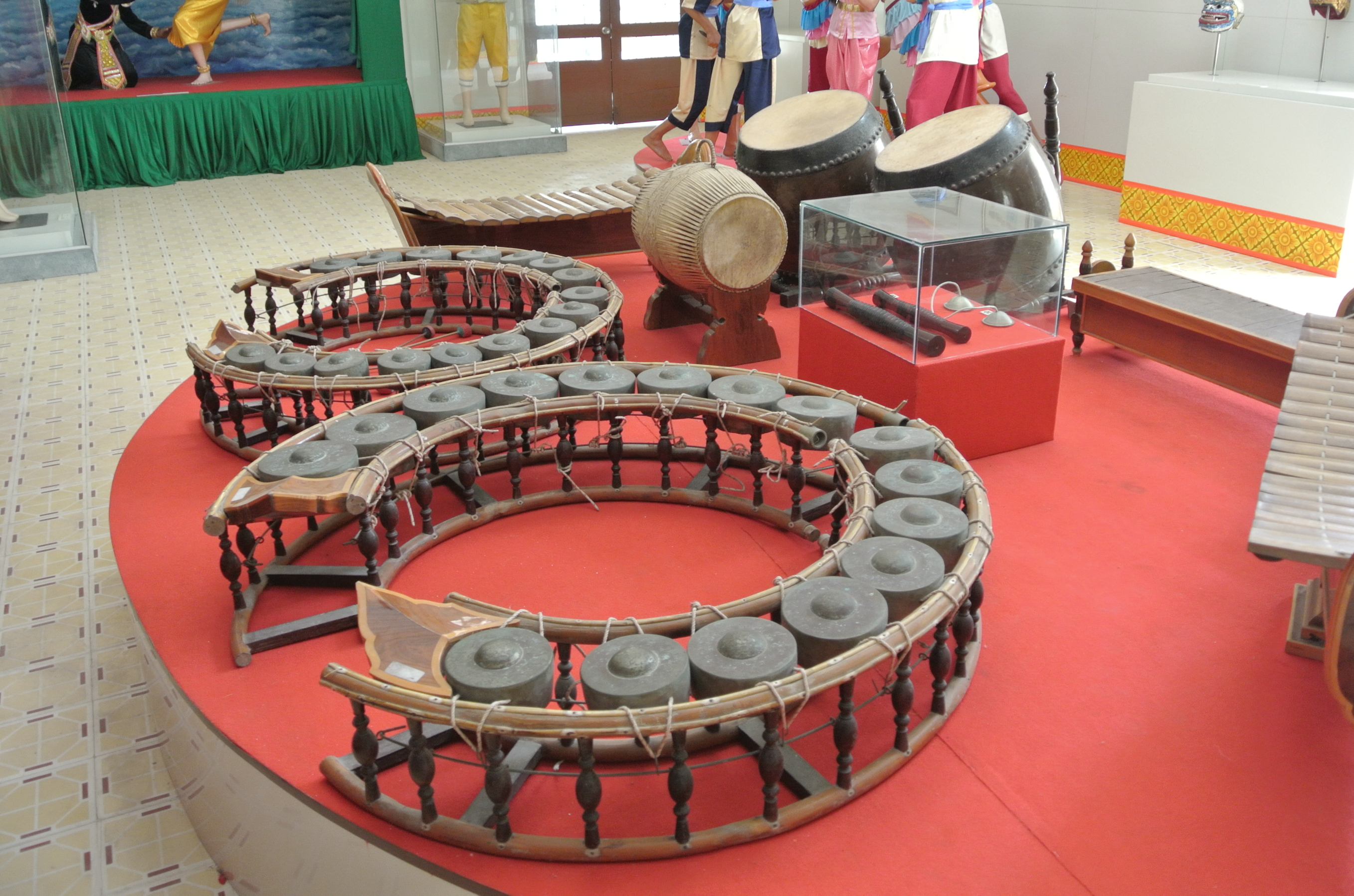
Instruments are (clockwise from front) gong chimes kong von thom and kong toch, roneat ek xylophone, samphor drum, skor thom drum, sralai toch and thom oboes in glass case, ching or chap small cymbals (also in glass case), roneat dek metal xylophone, and roneat thung bamboo xylophone (half in edge of photo).

- Kong vong toch (also called kong toch) - small gong circle
- Kong vong thom (also called kong thom) - large gong circle
- Kong mon (also called kong mon) - small gong chime shaped curved

=== Xylophone ===
Roneat (រនាត)- trough-resonated keyboard percussion instrument; generally played with two mallets and used in Khmer classical and theater music

  - Roneat ek - smaller xylophone
  - Roneat thung - larger xylophone
  - Roneat dek - smaller metallophone
  - Roneat thong larger metallophone; no longer used

=== Gongs ===
- Kong vong or kong thom (Khmer: គងធំ) - single suspended gong

=== Clappers ===
- Krap (ក្រាប់) - pair of flat bamboo or hardwood sticks

=== Cymbals ===
- Ching (ឈិង) - pair of small cymbals used to mark time
- Chap - pair of flat cymbals

=== Woodblocks ===
- Pan - woodblock
- Nay pay - pellow
- Sindang - small size woodblocks

== Occasions ==
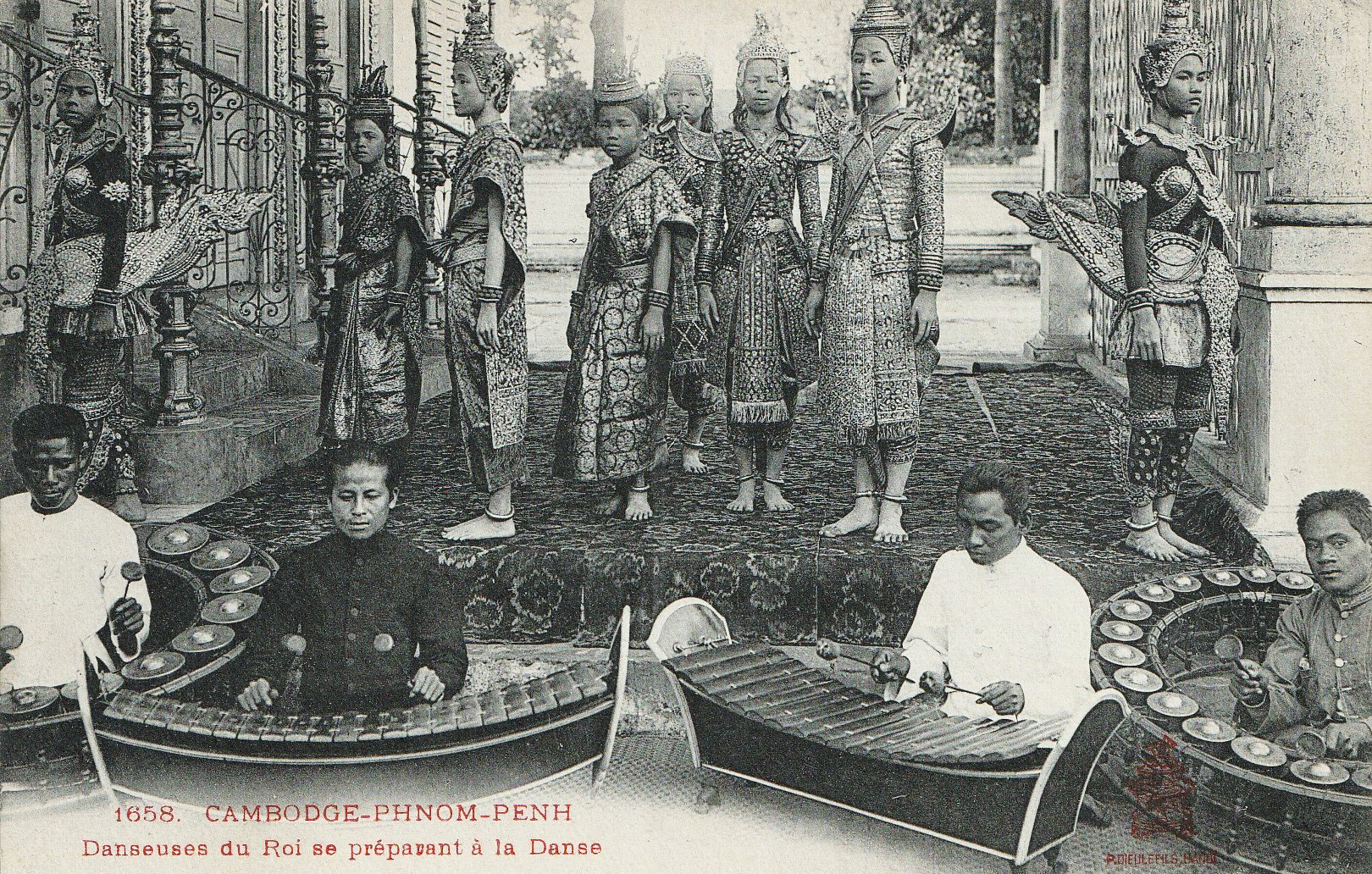
King's dancers accompanied by musicians before 1900

Traditional Cambodian musical instruments play a significant role in the Cambodian culture. These instruments are typically used during royal events, weddings, and festivals. For weddings and royal events, the musicians playing the instruments would wear traditional Cambodian attire. Just like the Chinese, with regard to playing context, there is no conductor in traditional Cambodian music because musicians generally learned and memorized how to play the instruments aurally. These instruments provide a sense of identity for the Cambodian people.

== See also ==
- Music of Cambodia
