= Gong chime =

Set of small, high-pitched bossed pot gongs

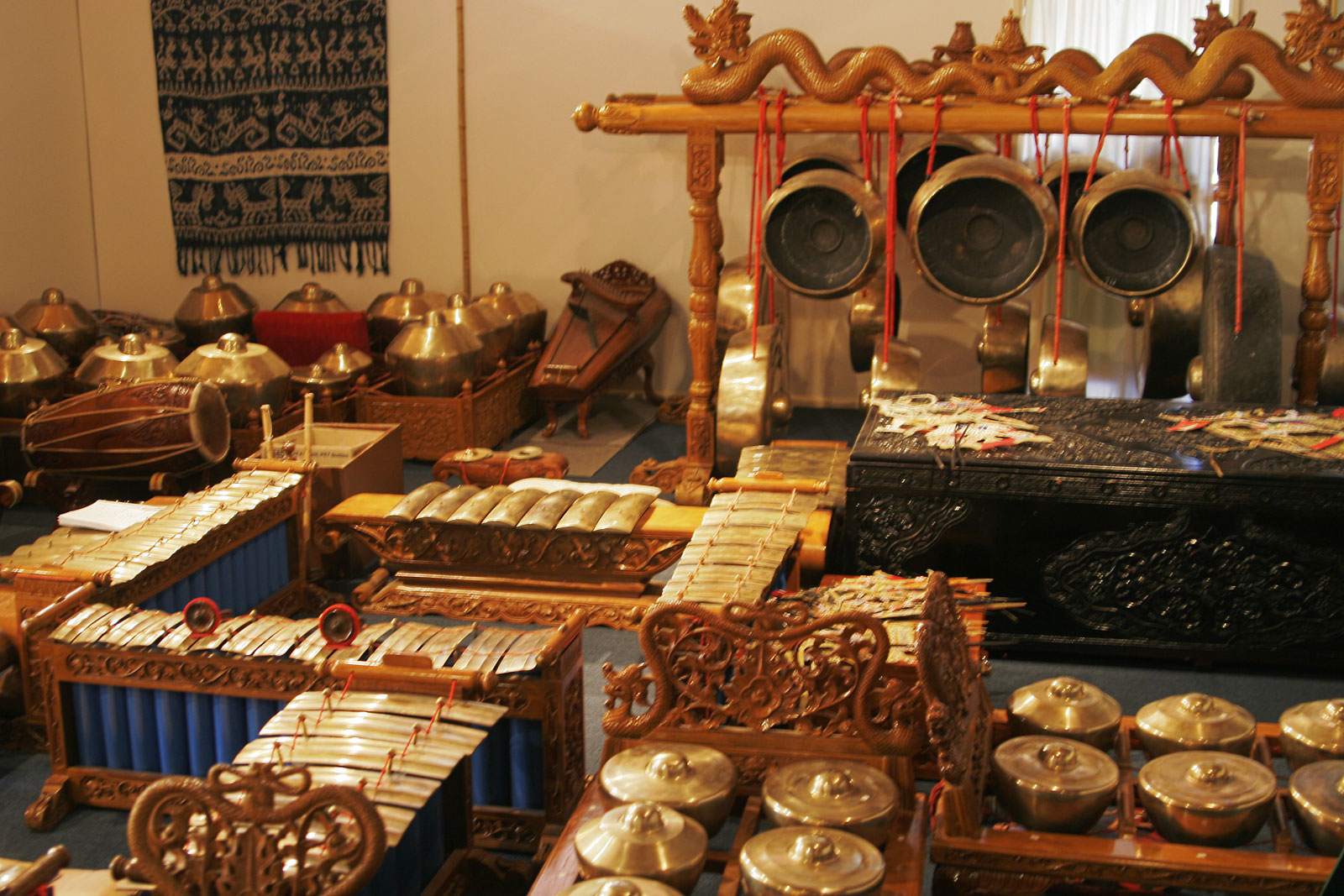
Indonesian traditional musical instruments with gong chime.

A gong chime is a generic term for a set of small, high-pitched bossed pot gongs. The gongs are ordinarily placed in order of pitch, with the boss upward on cords held in a low wooden frame. The frames can be rectangular or circular (the latter are sometimes called "gong circles"), and may have one or two rows of gongs. They are played by one to four musicians, each using two padded sticks to strike them. They are an important instrument in many Southeast Asian musical ensembles, such as Indonesian gamelan, kulintang, or Thai pi phat. For this reason, such ensembles are sometimes called "gong chime ensembles" or "gong chime orchestras," and the broad variety of music "gong chime music."

Gong chimes typically are played either in a soloistic style, providing a virtuosic embellishing role, or providing a rhythmic role, for example, in a colotomic structure.

The term may also be used to refer to hand-held tuned gongs played in high rhythmic density, such as the older Indonesian-Balinese reyong, and gangsa, and also some ensembles of minorities within the mountainous interior of Vietnam.

== List of gong chimes ==
Source: Sibyl Marcuse. Musical Instruments: A Comprehensive Dictionary. New York: Doubleday, 1964: 213.

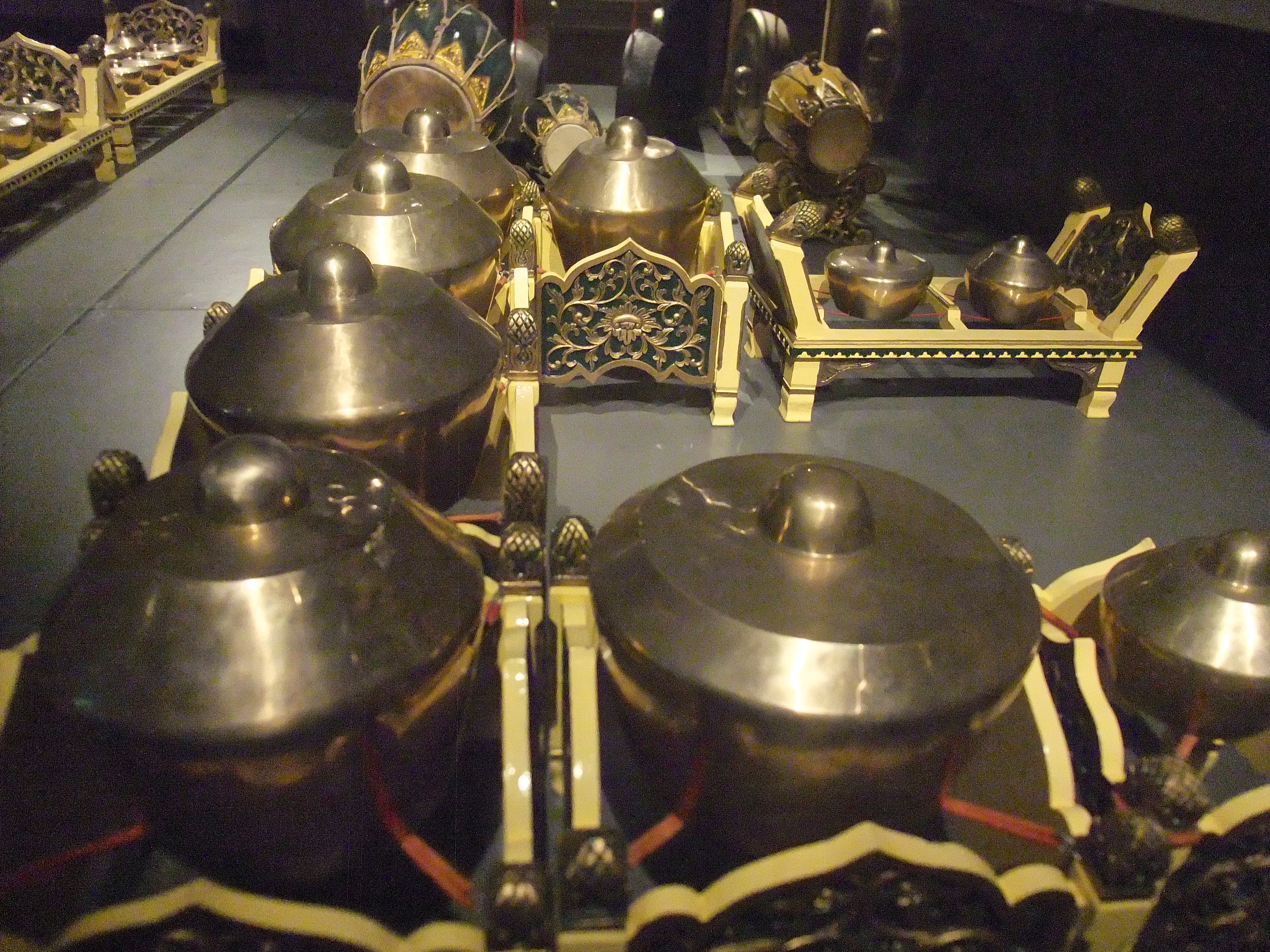
Indonesian gong chimes

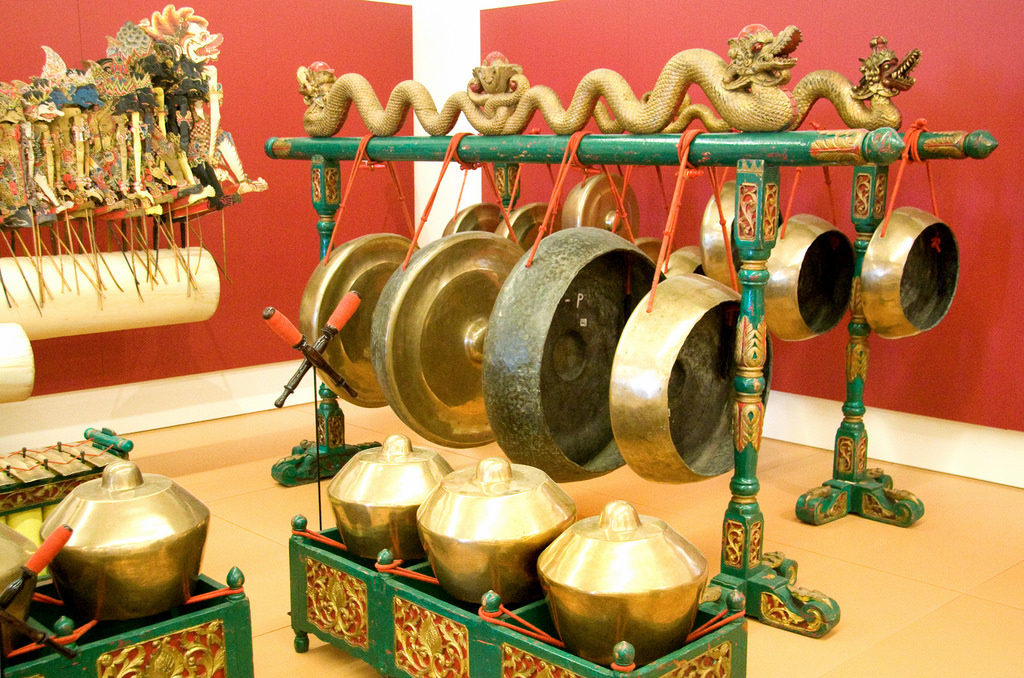
Gamelan degung, Musical Instruments Museum, Phoenix, Arizona

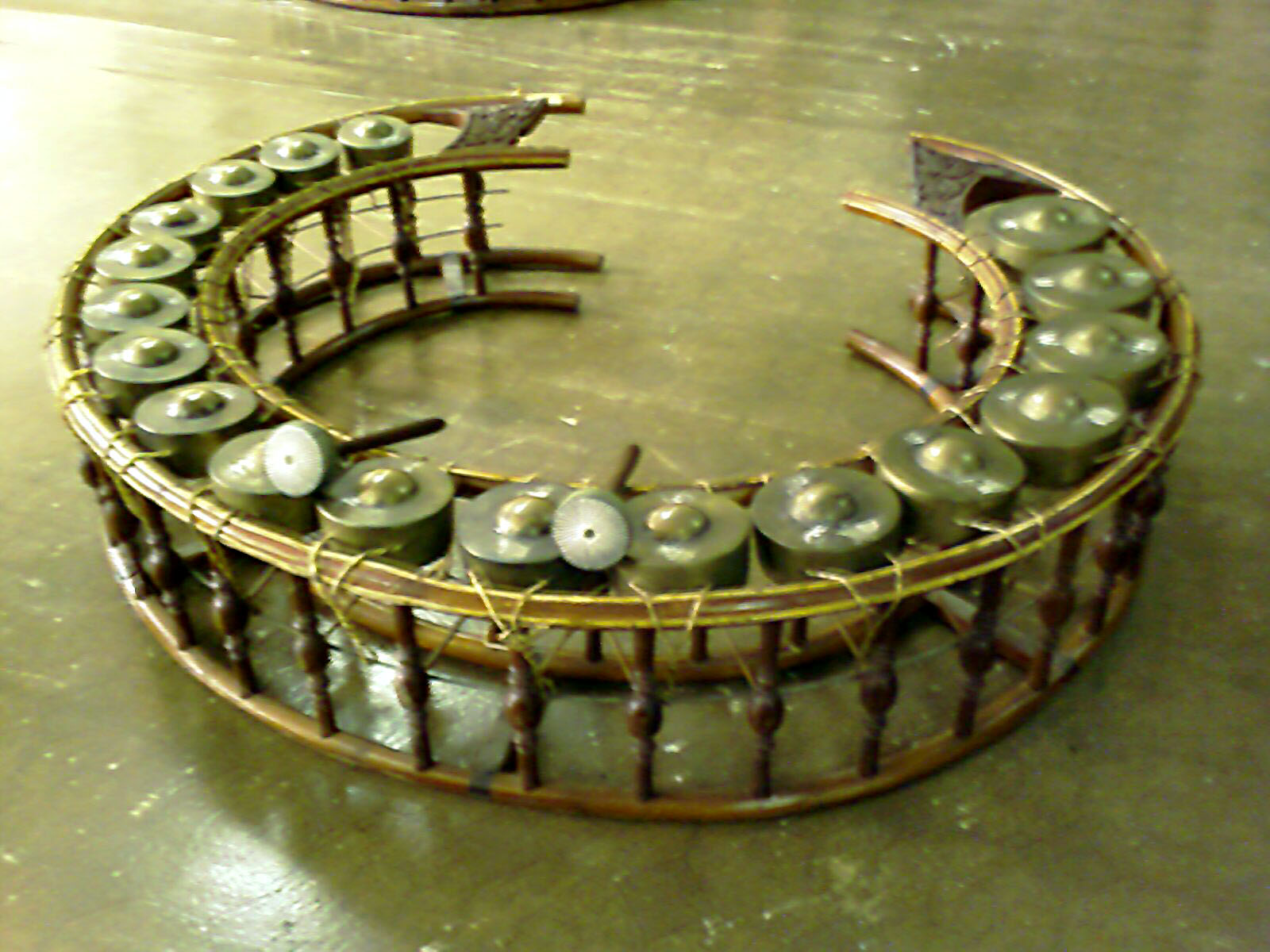
Thai gong chimes khong wong lek

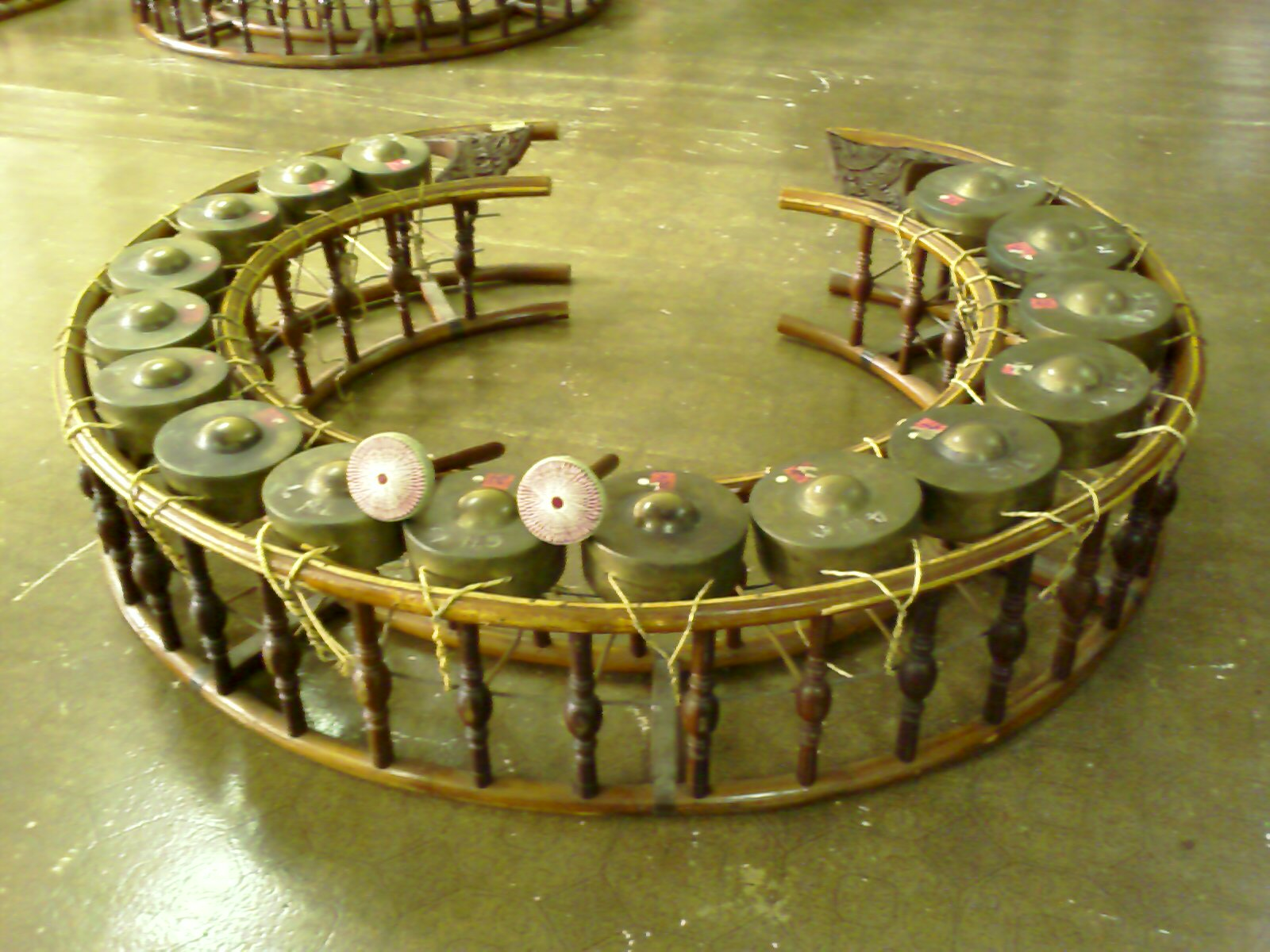
Thai gong chimes, khong wong yai

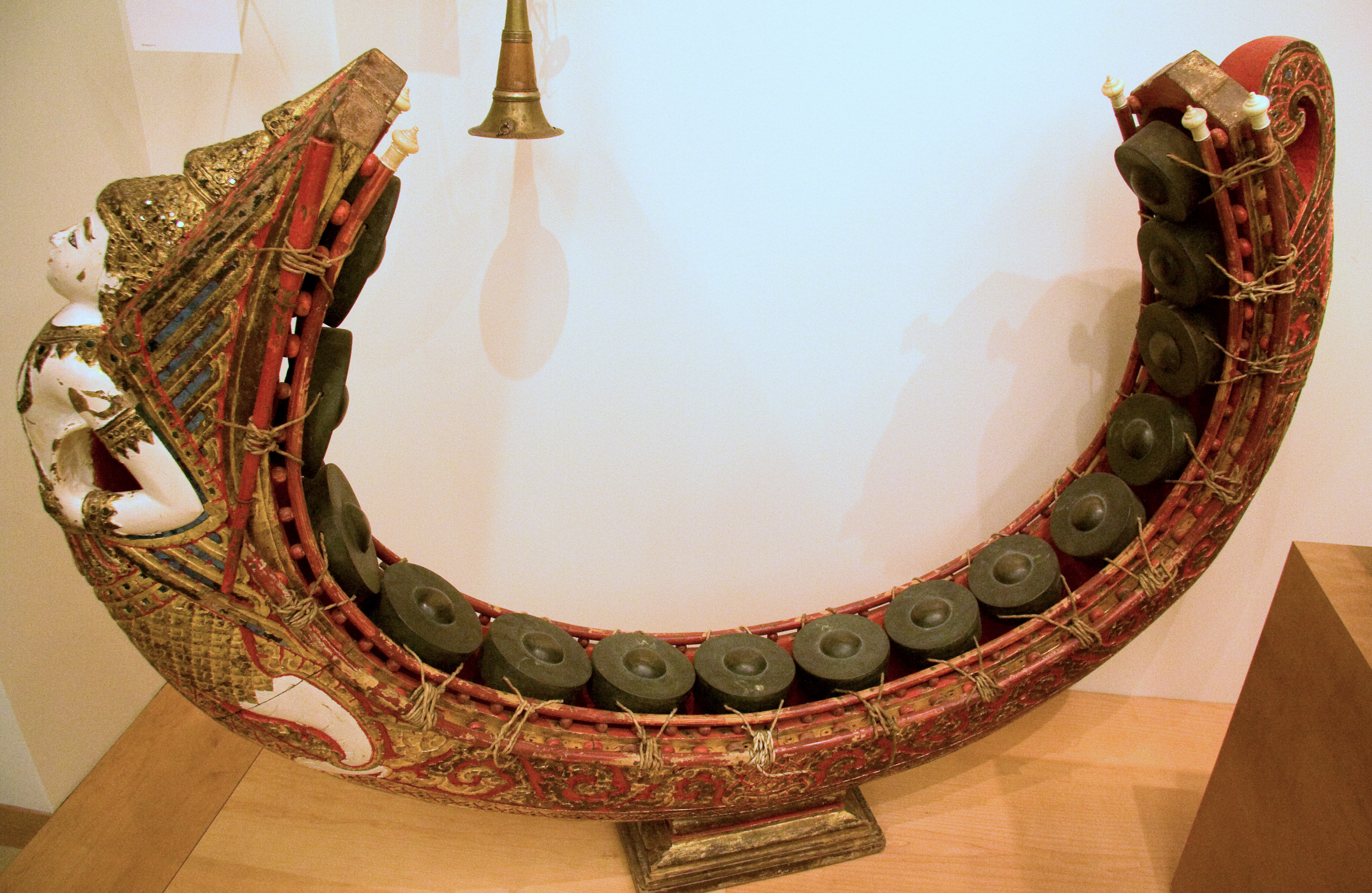
Cambodia (kong mon គងមន) and Thailand (khong mon ฆ้องมอญ), Museum of Musical Instruments in Phoenix, Arizona.

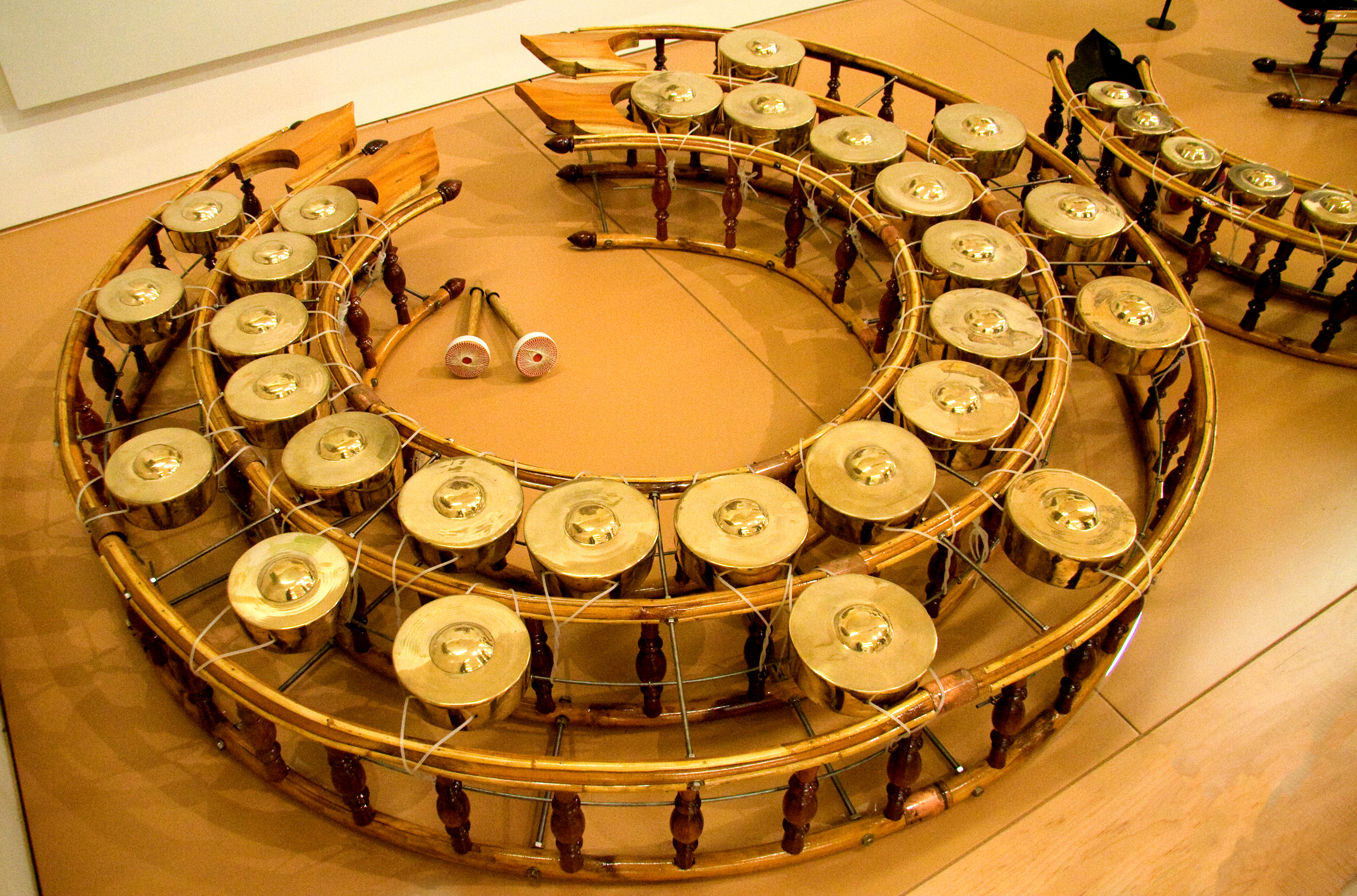
Cambodian gong chimes kong von thom

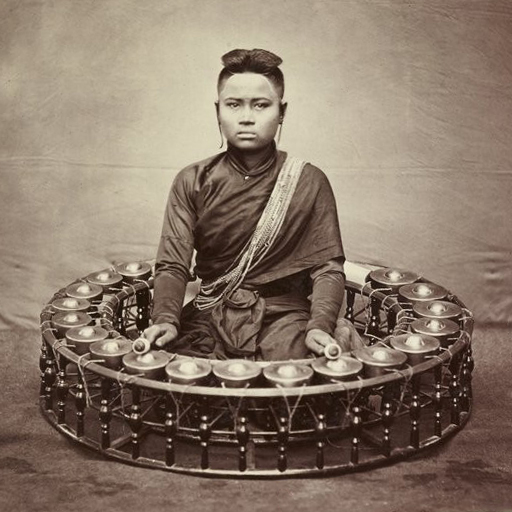
Cambodian gong chimes kong toch

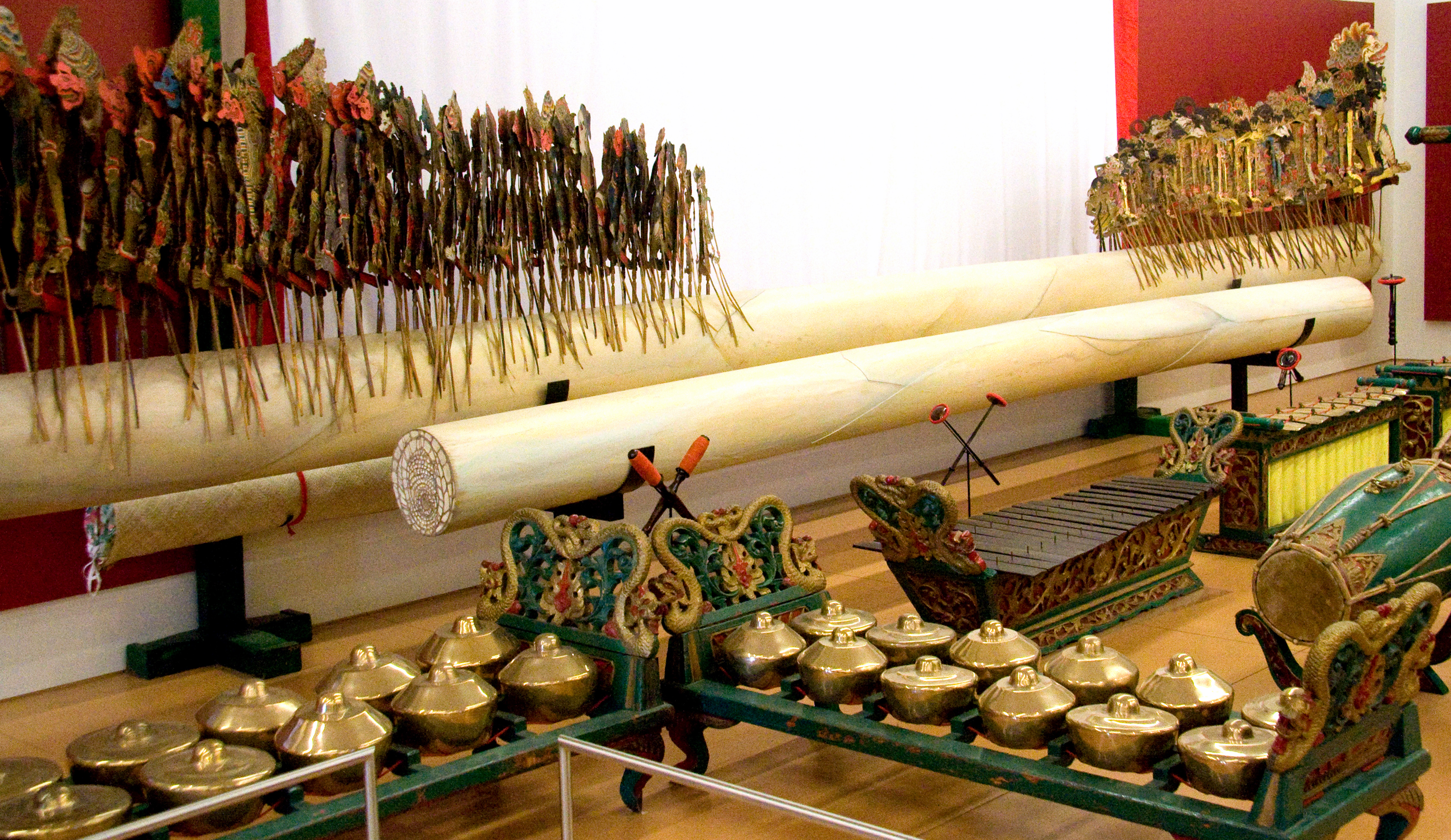
Gong Chimes and percussion, Indonesia section at Musical Instrument Museum, Phoenix, Arizona

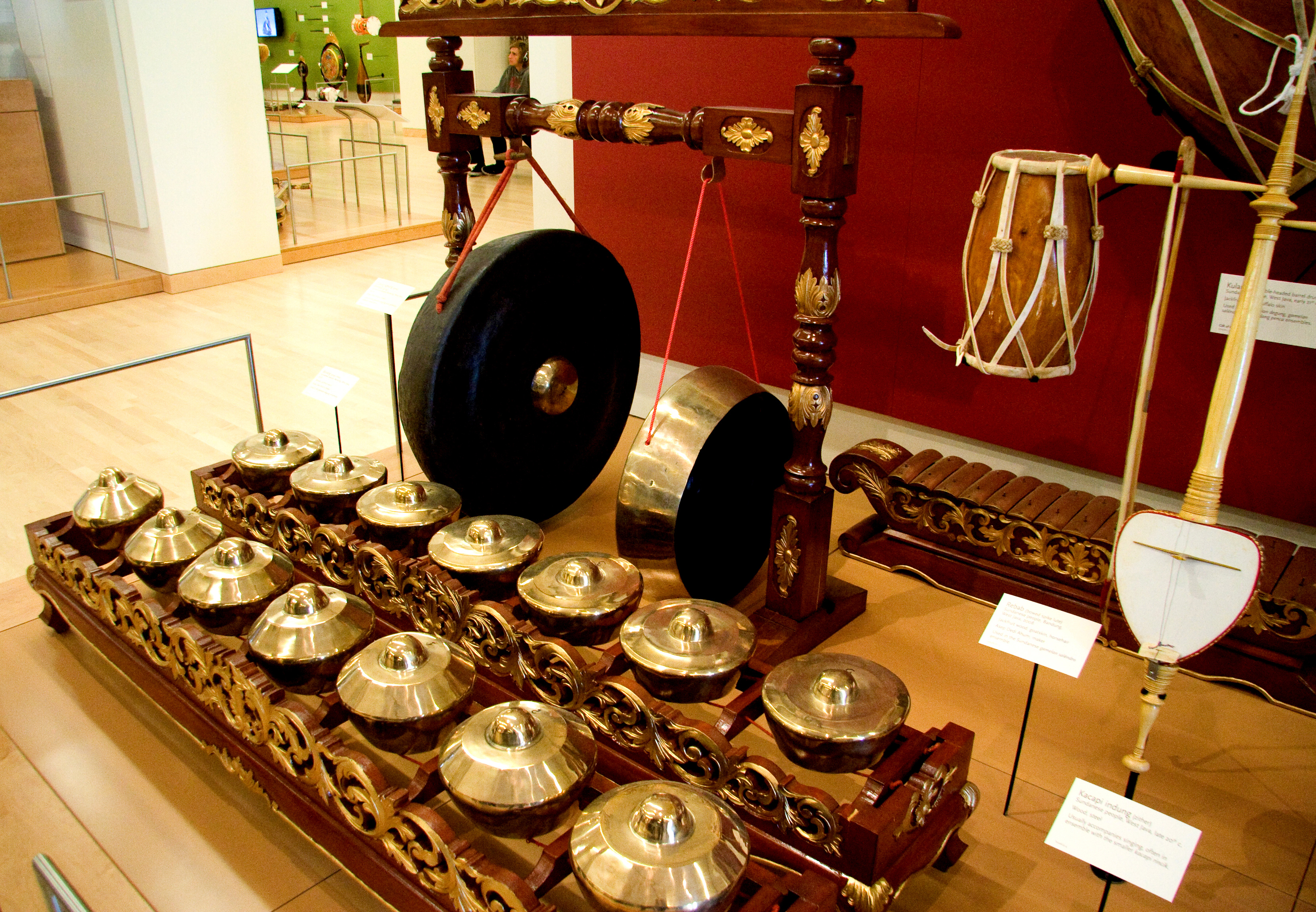
Javanese or Indonesian bonang gong chimes (foreground)

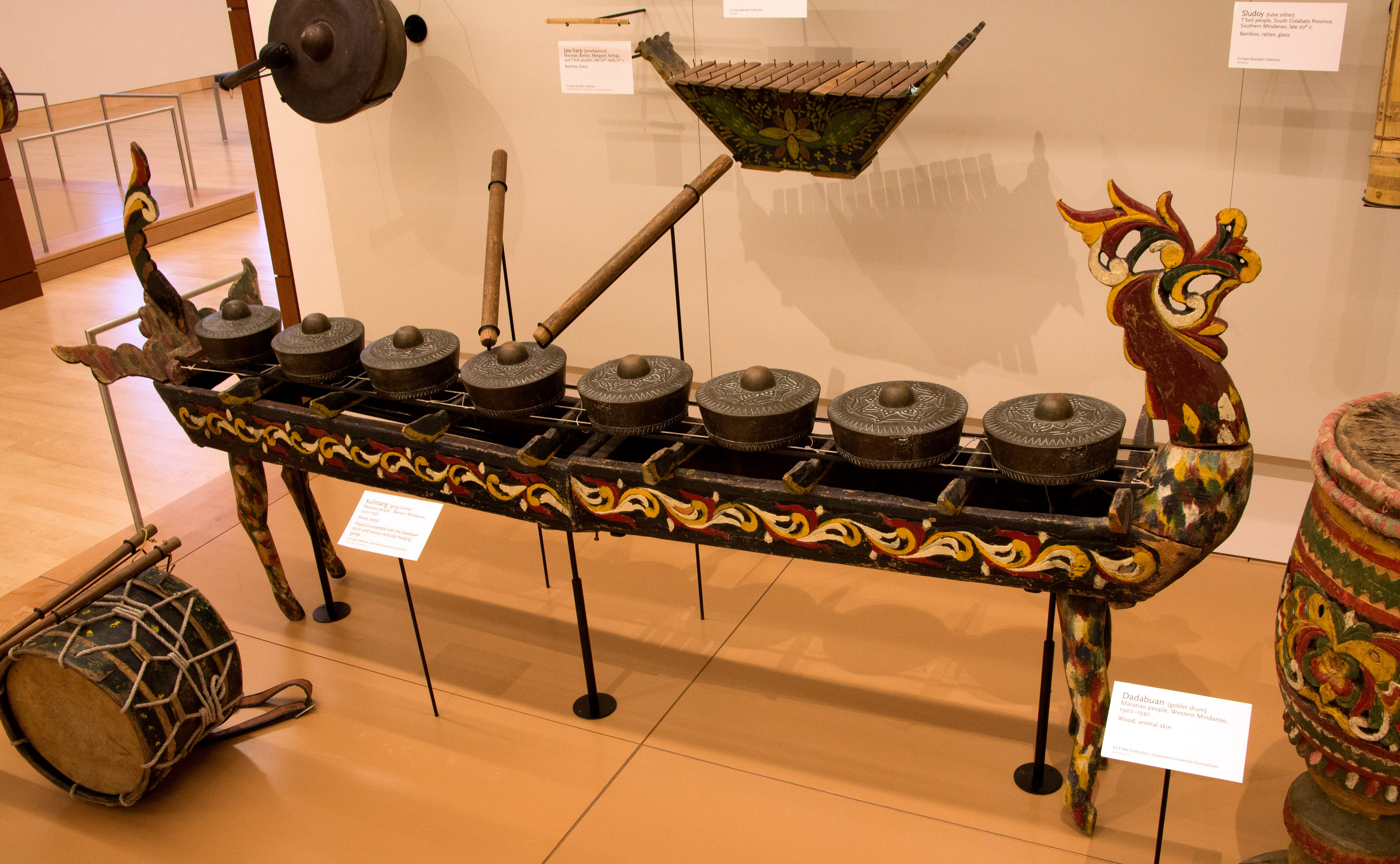
Philippines kulintang gong chimes

Stone-chimes and chime-bells

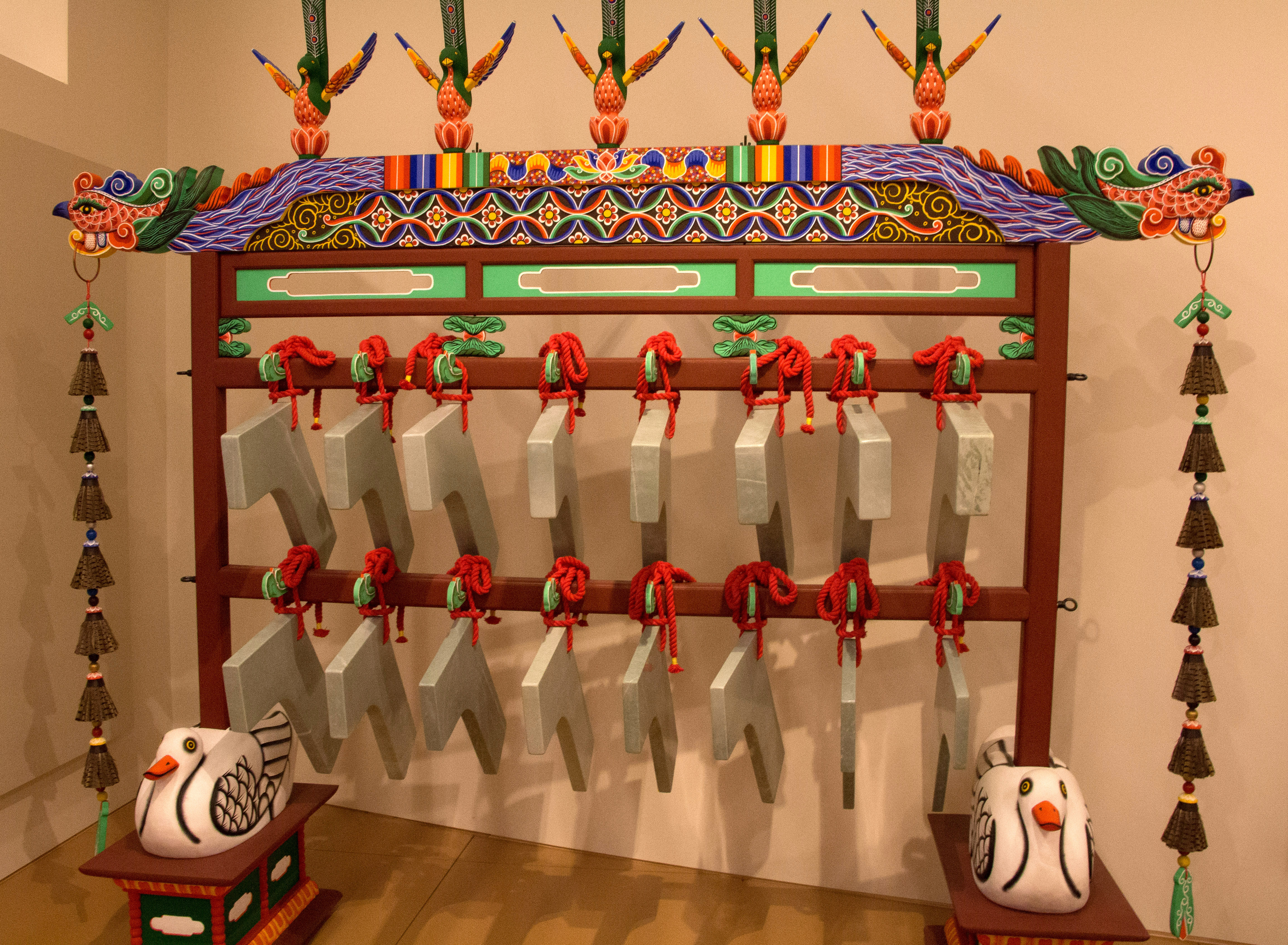
Korean pyeongyeong stone-chimes, a type of lithophone, Musical Instrument Museum, Phoenix, Arizona

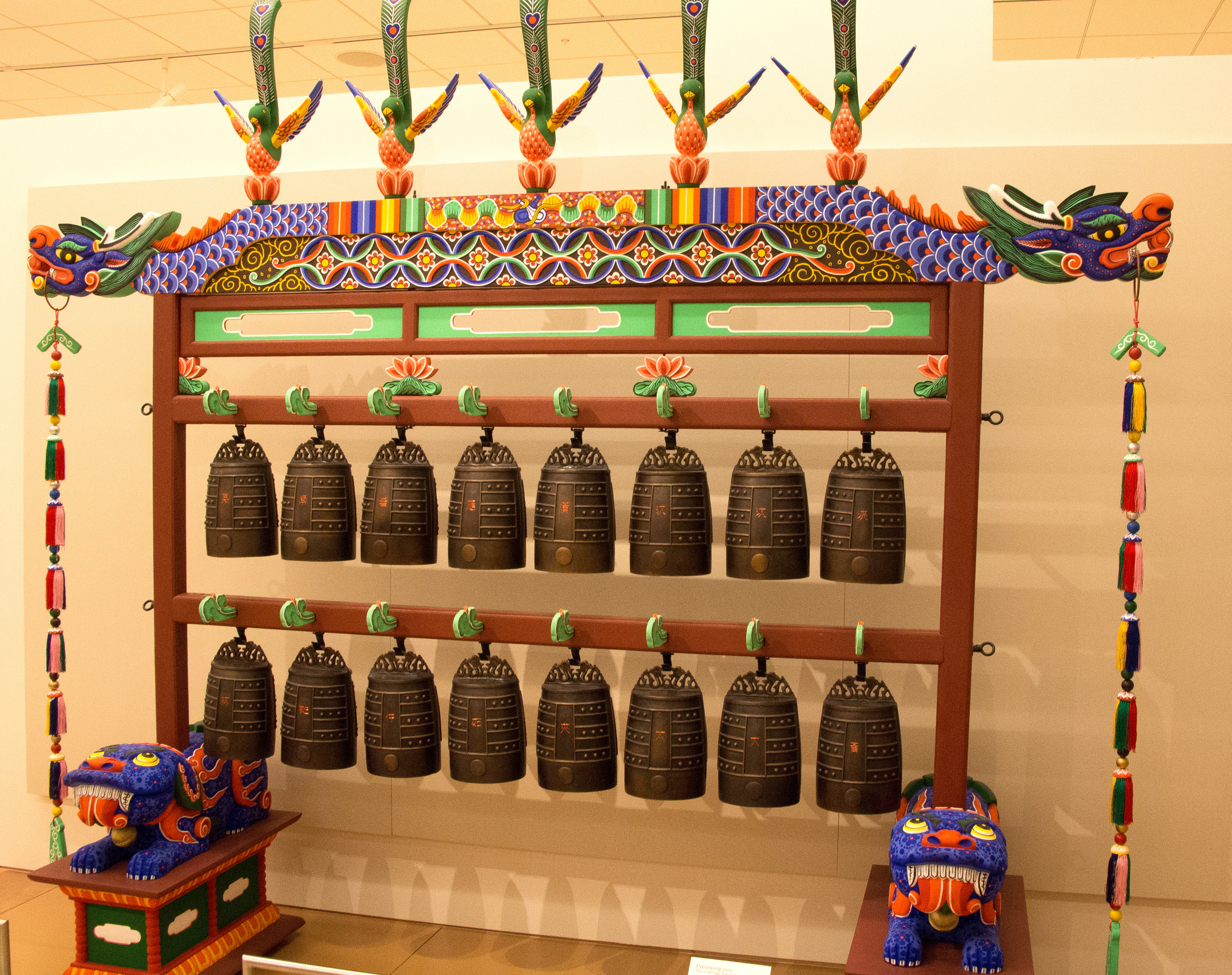
Korean pyeonjong chime-bells, Musical Instrument Museum, Phoenix, Arizona

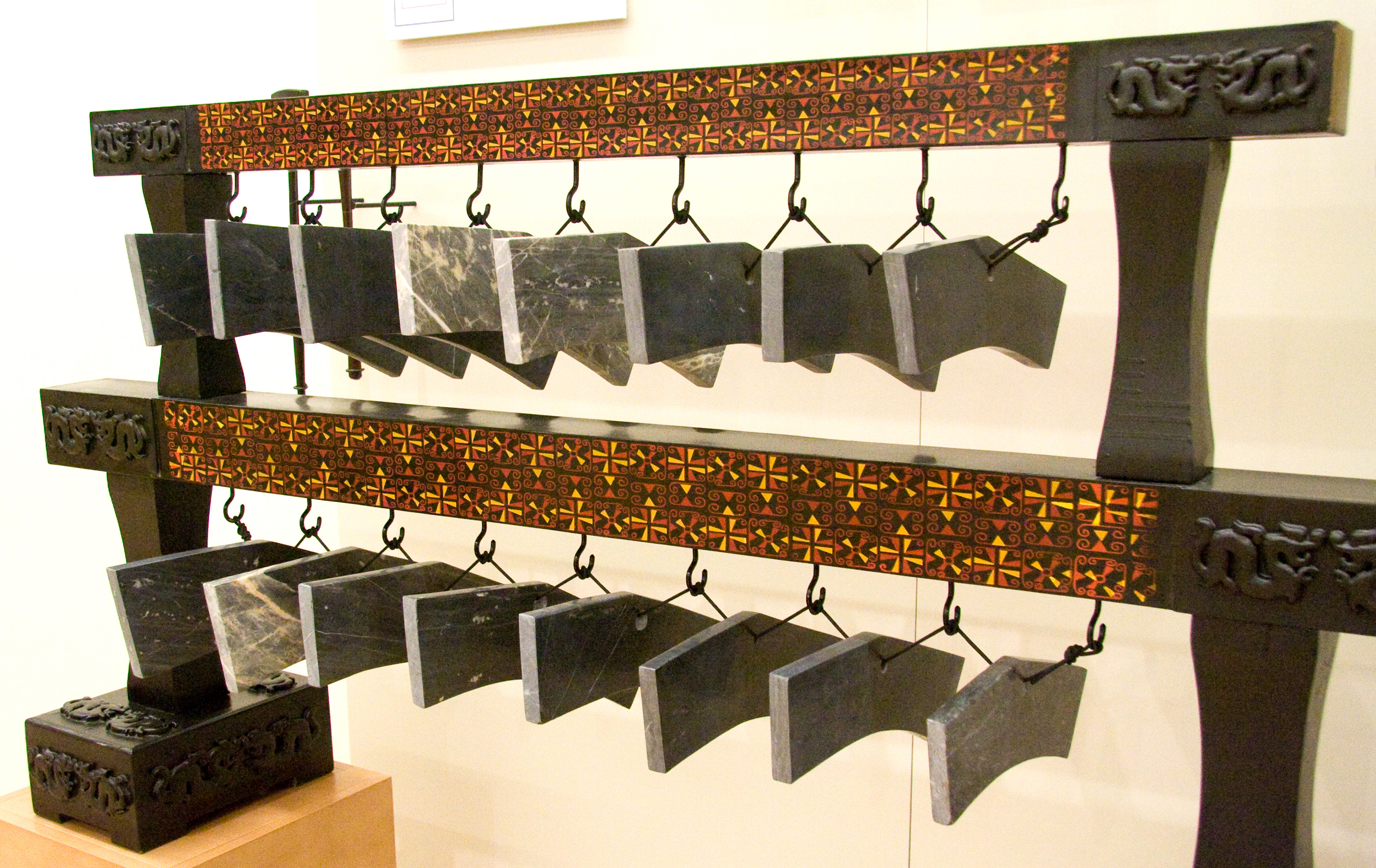
Chinese bianqing stone chimes, a type of lithophone, Musical Instrument Museum, Phoenix, Arizona

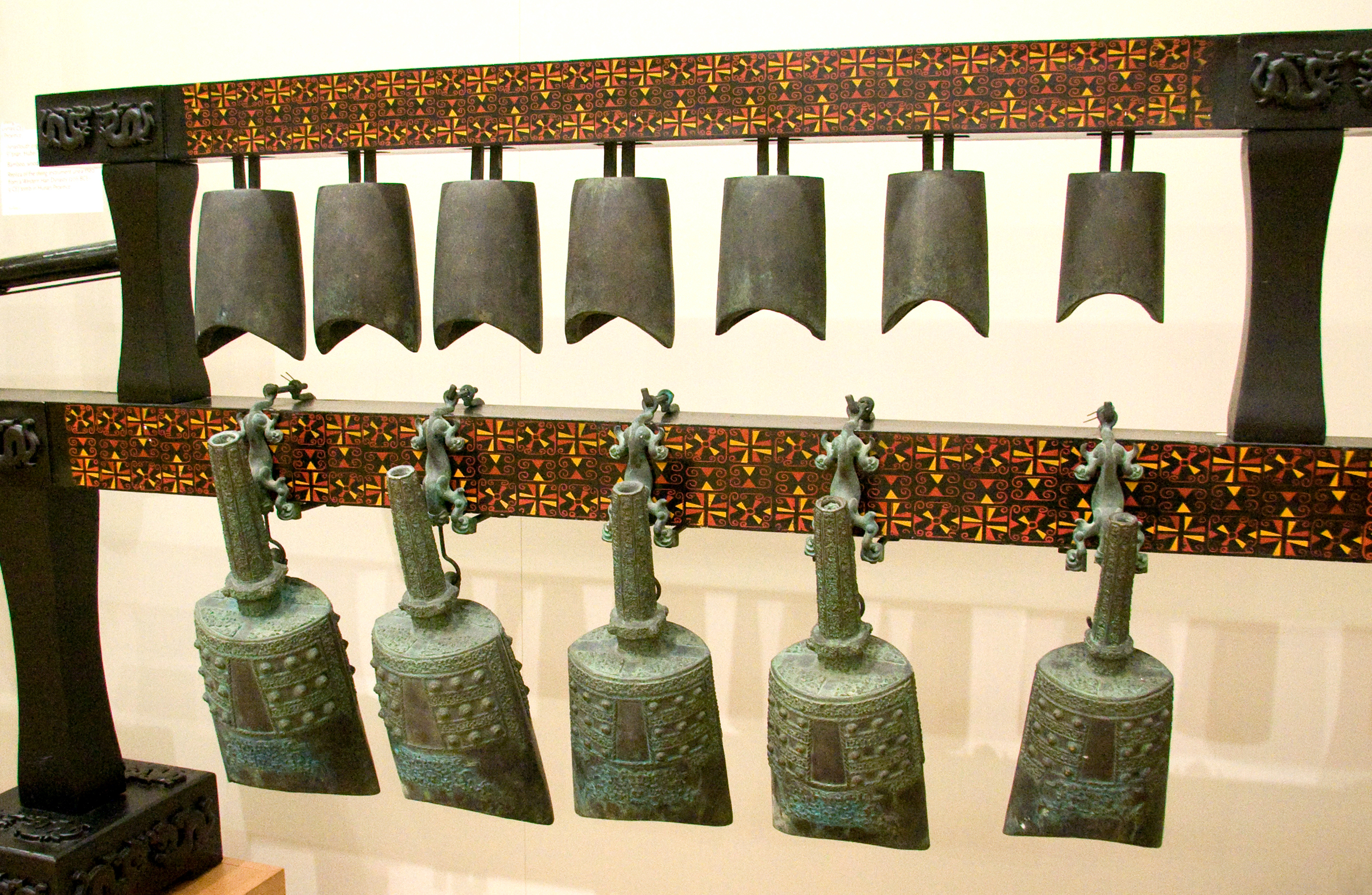
Chinese bianzhong chime-bells, Musical Instrument Museum, Phoenix, Arizona

Using stone or bells, these are set up in the same manner as gong chimes.
- Agung (Bangsamoro, Philippines)
- Babarangan (Bali, Indonesia)
- Bonang (Java, Indonesia)
- Cồng chiêng (Vietnam)
- Cang-chen (Tibet)
- Degung (West Java, Indonesia)
- Gong hui (Thailand)
- Jengglong (West Java, Indonesia)
- Kenong (Java, Indonesia)
- Khong mon (Mon of Burma and Thailand)
- Khong ñai (Laos)
- Khong noï (Laos)
- Khong wong lek (Thailand)
- Khong wong yai (Thailand)
- Kong von thom (Cambodia)
- Kong toch (Cambodia)
- Kong mon (Cambodia)
- Gangsa (Bali, Indonesia)
- Kulintang (Indonesia)
- Kromo (Dayak people of Borneo, Indonesia)
- Kye waing (Burma)
- Maung zaing (Burma)
- Mong (Shan State)
- Reyong (Bali, Indonesia)
- Talempong (Minangkabau of Sumatra, Indonesia)
- Tatabuan (Moluccas, Indonesia)
- Yunluo (China)

== See also ==
- Gong
- Gamelan
- Music of Indonesia
