= Pat kon =

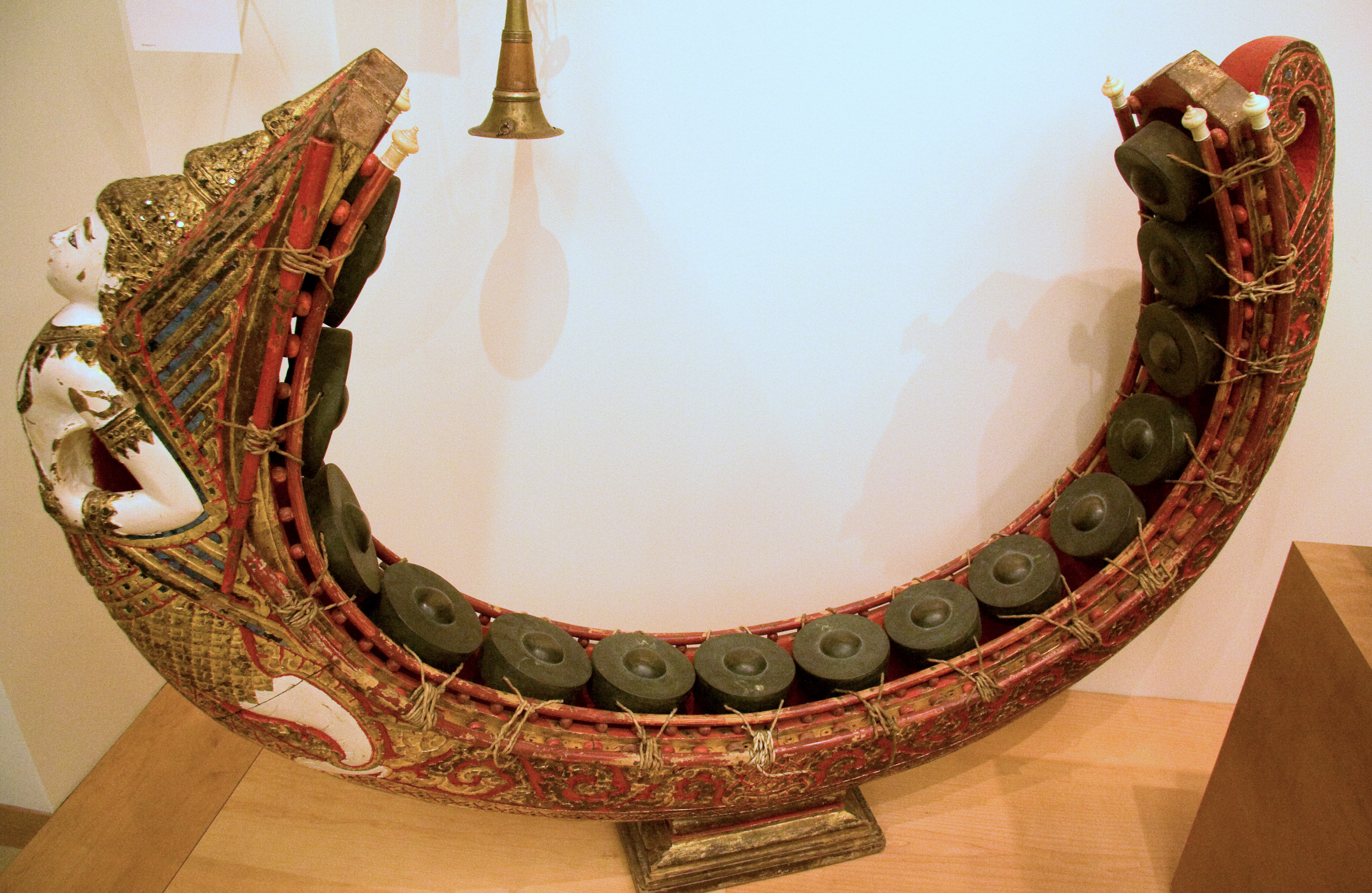
- Other names: La gyan hsaing Khong mon Kong mon
- Classification: Percussion (idiophone)

The pat kon (Mon: ဗာတ်ကိုၚ်) is a graduated brass gong chime associated with the Mon people of mainland Southeast Asia. The pat kon has been absorbed into the traditional musical ensembles of neighboring Southeast Asian societies.

== Names ==
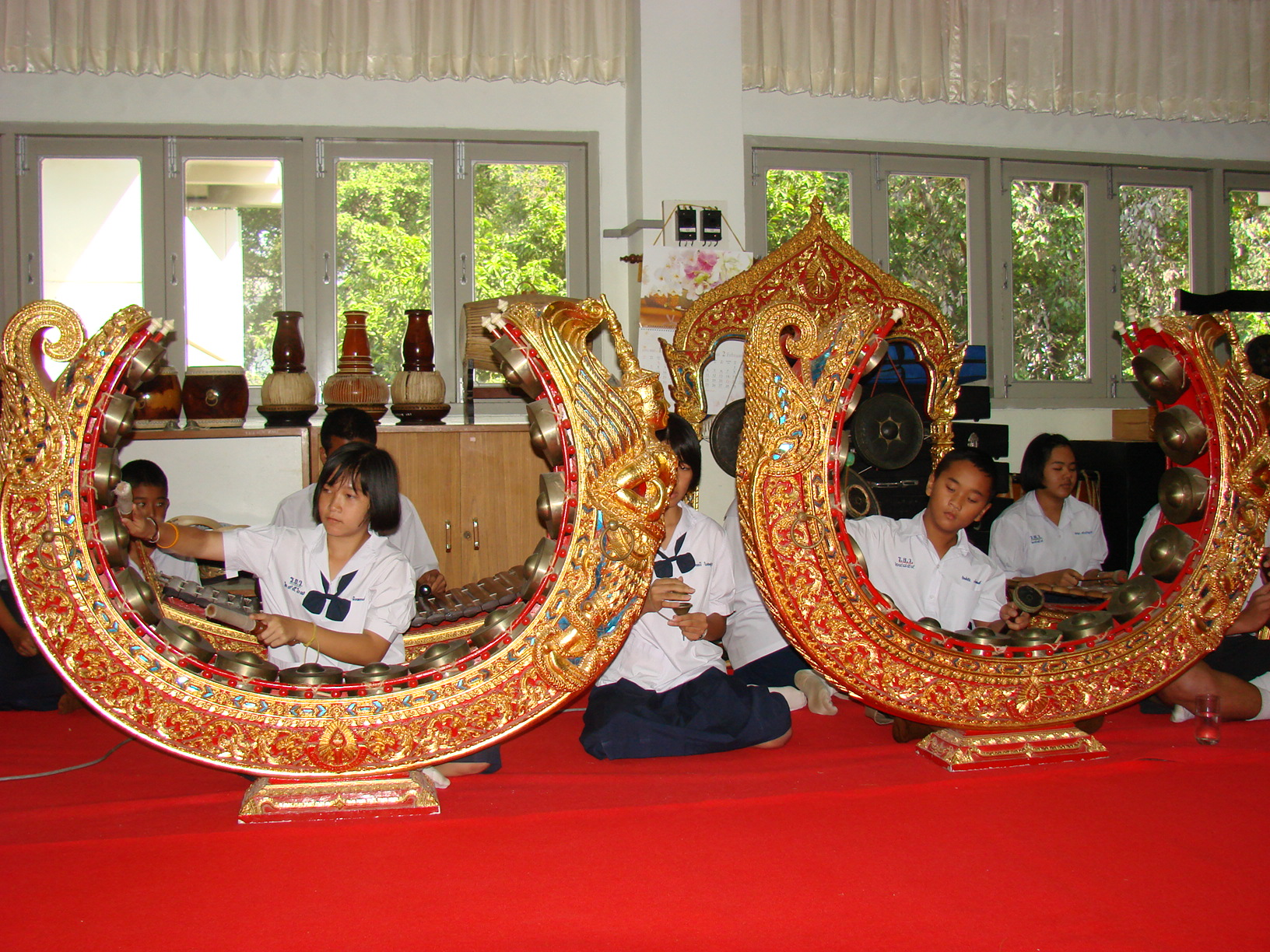

Gong chimes, drums, horns in the Angkor Wat bas-reliefs Khmer temple, reign of Suryavarman II (1113–1150 AD), Siem Reap, Cambodia.

The instrument is known by various names within the region, including la gyan hsaing (Burmese: လခြမ်းဆိုင်း), la gyan kye waing (လခြမ်းကြေးဝိုင်း), khong mon (Thai: ฆ้องมอญ, pronounced [kʰɔ́ːŋ mɔːn]) and kong mon (Khmer: គងមន). In the Mon language, it is called naung not (Mon: ဏံၚ်ဏောတ်) or pat kon cao (Mon: ဗာတ်ကောန်စှ်, lit. 'ten child gongs').

== Design and variations ==
The pat kon consists of about a dozen (10 - 15) gongs mounted in a vertical crescent-shaped wooden frame. It produces the same range of pitches as the more common gong circles (such as the Kong toch and khong wong), but rather than resting on the ground, the wooden frame of this instrument extends into the air in the shape of a horseshoe. The instrument was formerly used in nat (spirit) propitiation ceremonies, and originally consisted of 14 gongs, but a 15th gong was added in 1962, tuned to the fifth note.

The instrument's wooden frame is made of beechwood (Gmelina arborea), with rattan used to suspend the individual gongs. The wooden frame is embellished with traditional arabesque or kanok designs, inlaid with glass mosaic, and carvings depicting a stylized kinnari bird or devas. The image of a half-man, half-bird figure carved onto the frame is traditional, and is meant to symbolize a celestial musician. The frame is also typically decorated lavishly in gold paint and glass mosaic. Khong mon are featured in a special type of Thai ensemble called pi phat, which plays pi phat mon or pi phat nang hong into the mainstream of traditional Thai music as well; pi phat mon or pi phat nang hong is usually performed by Thai musicians.

== See also ==
- Khong wong yai
- Khong wong lek
