= Chap (instrument) =

Percussion instrument

A chap or chhap (Thai: ฉาบ, Khmer: ឆាប) is a percussion instrument. It is made from bronze, as is a ching, but is thinner. The chap consists of two thin, round disks or plates with a bulge in the center. The plates are held against the hands like cymbals, using handles made of string, passing through a hole in the center of each plate. The name comes from the sound the instrument makes when struck directly together, "chap, chap." The "timbre or tone" change when struck at an angle.

There are two kinds of chap: chap lek and chap yai. A chap lek's diameter is 12–14 cm. A chap yai's diameter is 24–26 cm. The Cambodian names for the two kinds of chap are chap thom (large chap) and chap toch (small chap).

== See also ==
- Traditional Thai musical instruments
- Traditional Cambodian musical instruments
