= Kong thom =

Musical instrument

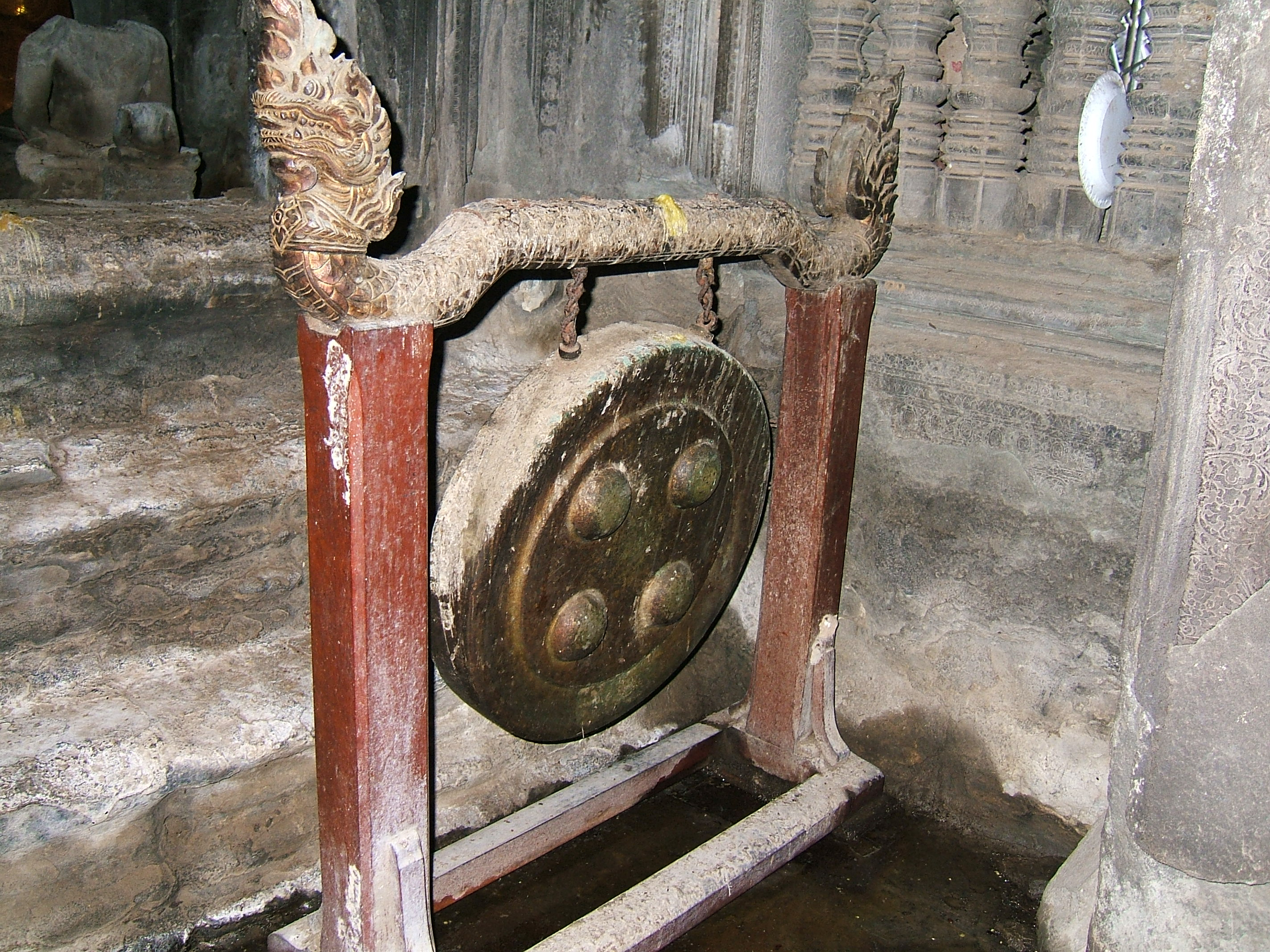
Gong below the main sanctum sanctorum of the Angkor Wat, possibly a Kong thom (a single hanging gong).

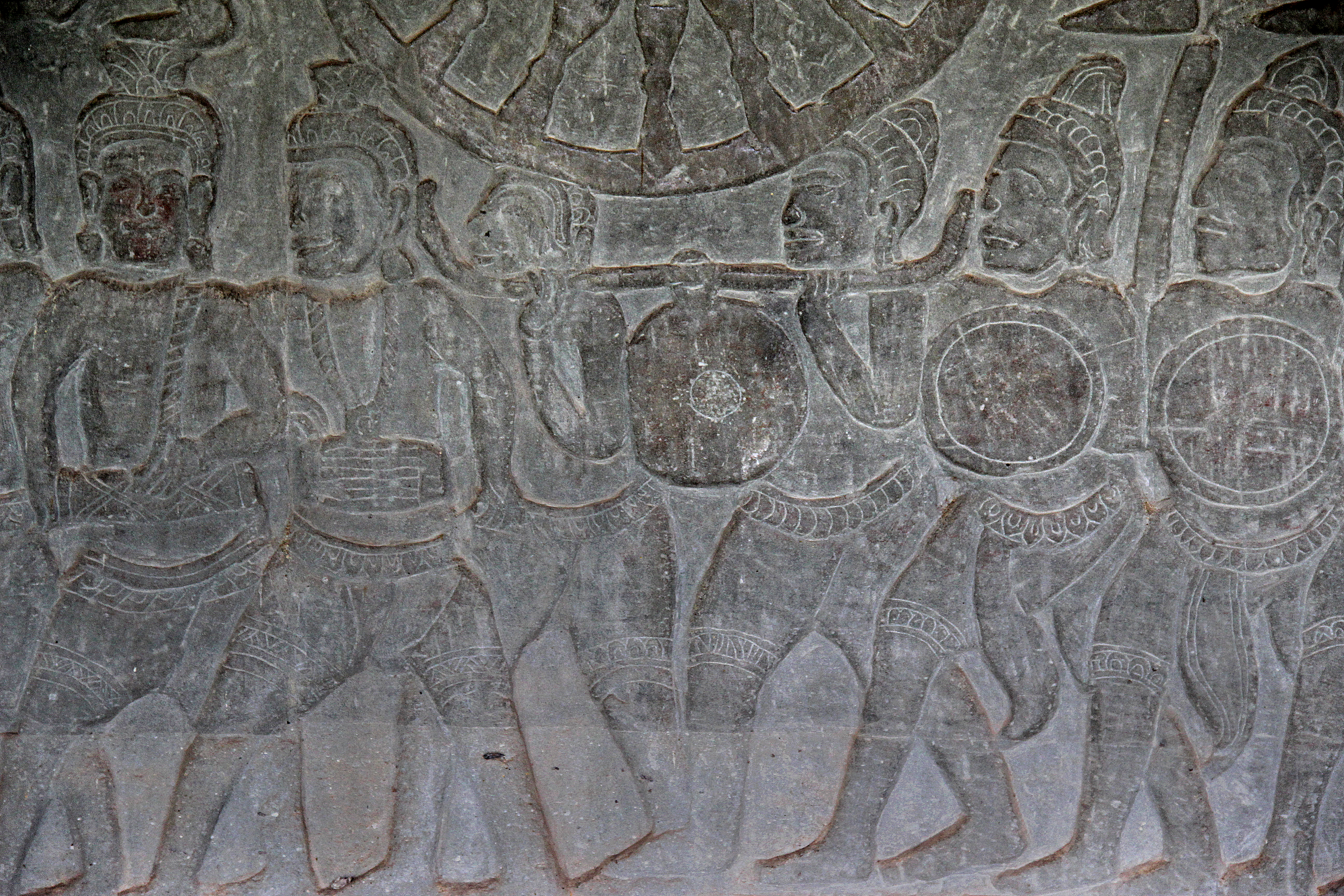
Example of a hanging gong from Angkor Wat, north gallery, 16th century. The gong hanging on the two men's shoulders is a nipple gong, a type used in the highlands today.

The kong thom (Khmer: គងធំ) is a Cambodian musical instrument, a hanging gong. The name may also refer to the kong von thom, a set of gong chimes arranged in a circular frame.
