= Khong wong lek =

Musical instrument

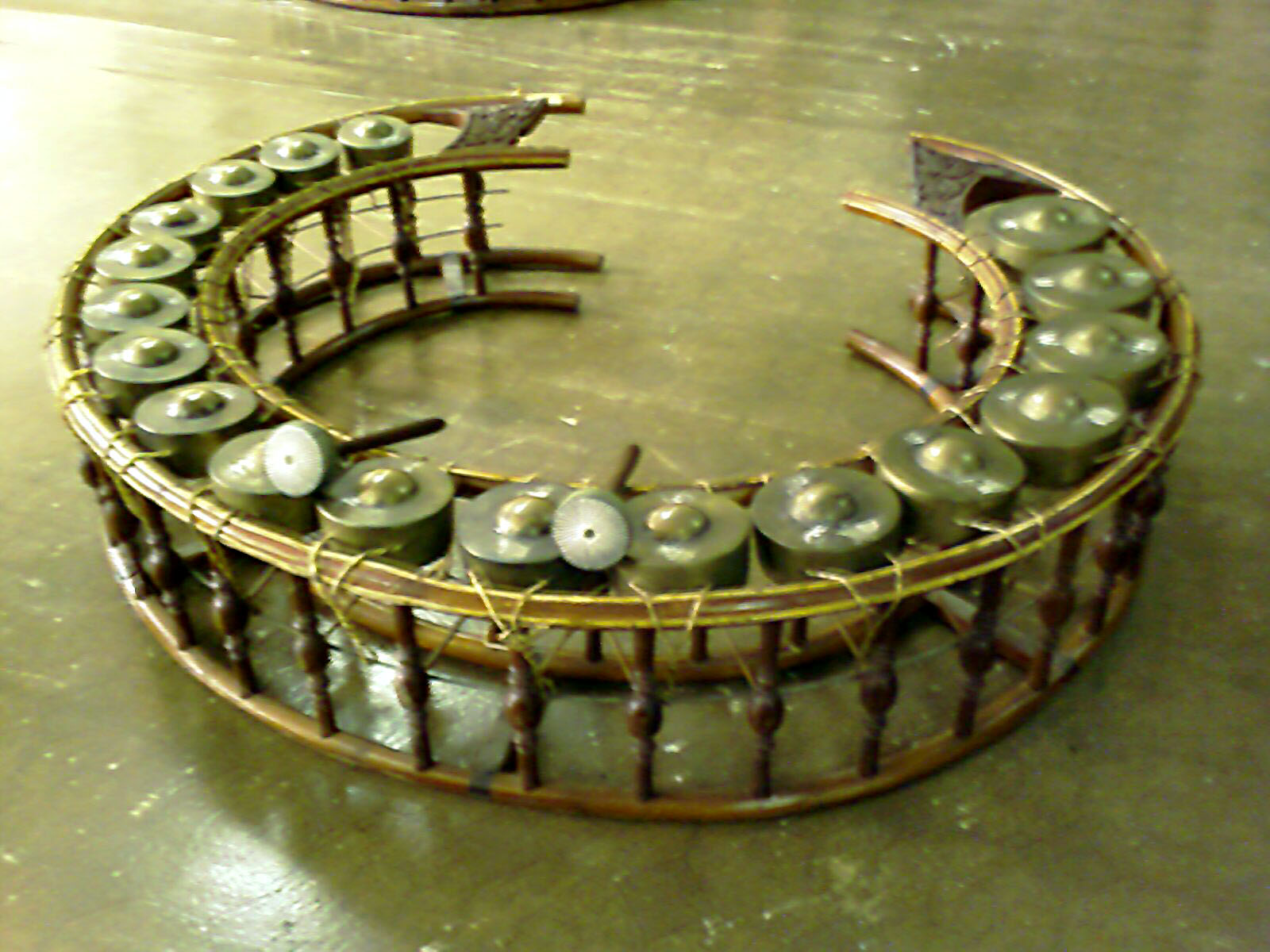
- Classification: Percussion (idiophone)

Related instruments
- Khong wong yai

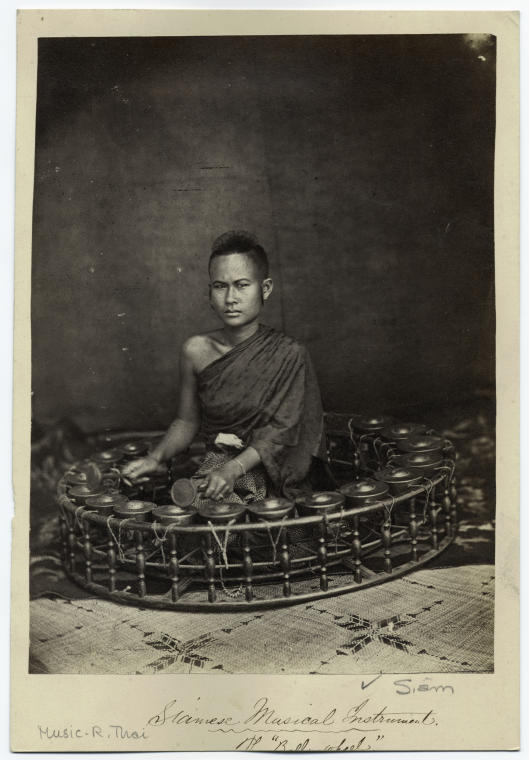
Musician playing kong wong lek, 19th century.

The khong wong lek (Thai: ฆ้องวงเล็ก, pronounced [kʰɔ́ːŋ woŋ lék]) is a gong circle used in Thai classical music. It has 18 tuned bossed gongs, and is smaller and higher in pitch than the khong wong yai. Both instruments are played in the same manner, the khong wong lek plays a faster and more ornate variation on the principal melody, with less use of two-note chords. Each gong is tuned with beeswax under it.

The khawng wong lek was created during the reign of King Rama III (1824–1854) by skilled musicians.

It is equivalent to the Cambodian Kong toch.
