= Kong von thom =

Musical instrument

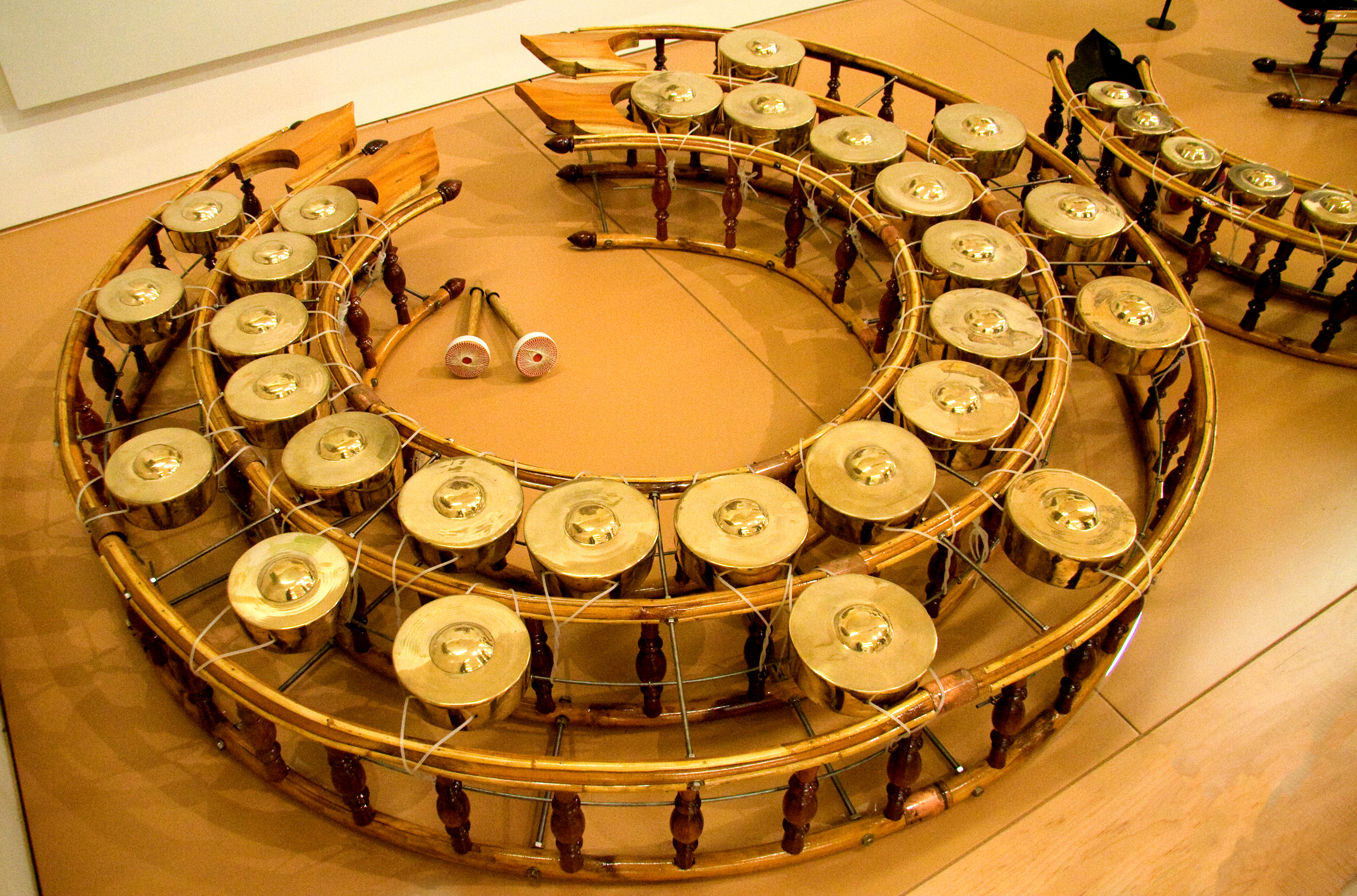
Cambodian kong von thom. It is the lower pitched gong chime set of Cambodia's two main gong chimes groups. The higher pitched set in Cambodia is the kong von toch (upper right corner). This particular set of kong von thom chimes has an extra outer row of chimes.

The kong von thom or kong thom (Khmer: គងធំ) plays a melodic line in the Cambodian pinpeat ensemble almost identical to that of the roneat thung (large xylophone). The kong thom dwells more steadily on the pulse without pulling or delaying the beat (melody). The player uses soft mallets for indoor performance, hard ones for outdoors. The kong von thom is analogous to the khong wong yai used in Thailand.

== History ==
Gong chimes, drums, horns in the Angkor Wat bas-reliefs Khmer temple, reign of Suryavarman II (1113-1150 AD), Siem Reap, Cambodia.

The Khmer word korng/ kong "gong" is refers to all types of gong including the flat or bossed gong, single or in a set, suspended on cords from hooks, or a gong placed over a frame. The history of these gongs can be traced in part from the epigraphy and iconography of Funan-Chenla and Angkor periods, for many can be seen carved on ancient Khmer temple.

== Construction ==
The gong circle-maker creates sixteen bossed gongs made of copper with bronze admixture. He suspends them on rattan frames in a circle around the player. He tunes the individual gongs by dripping into the upturned boss a mixture of mud-lead, rice husks, and beeswax.

The kong thom's smaller cousin is called kong toch.

== Name similarity ==
Another also uses instrument the shorter name Kong thom — a hanging gong. That instrument is not used in orchestras.

== See also ==
- Kong toch
