= Khong wong yai =

Musical instrument

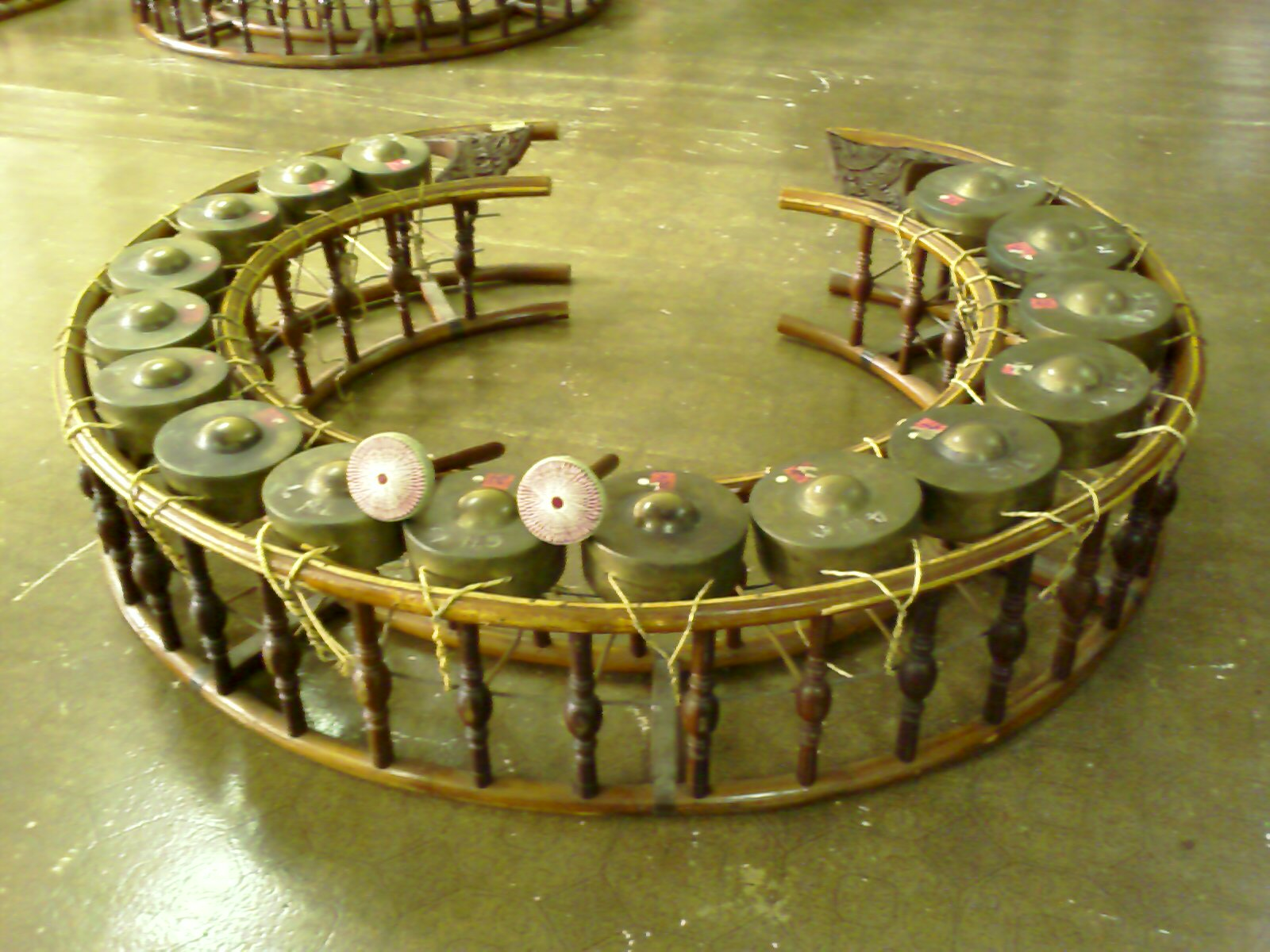

Percussion instrument
- Classification: Percussion (idiophone)

Related instruments
- Khong wong lek, khong wong mahori, khong wong lek mahori

The khong wong yai (Thai: ฆ้องวงใหญ่, pronounced [kʰɔ́ːŋ woŋ jàj]) is a circle with gongs used in the music of Thailand. It has 16 tuned bossed gongs in a rattan frame and is played with two beaters. The player sits in the center of the circle. It is used in the piphat ensemble to provide the skeletal melody the other instruments of the elaborate ensemble. The gongs are individually tuned with beeswax under the gongs. The khong wong yai can either be played with soft beaters or hard beaters.

It is equivalent to the kong thom in Cambodian music.

== History ==
Khong Wong Yai can be considered a musical instrument with a long history. Among the instruments used today and it has been an important instrument since ancient times. It is the main instrument of the Thai music band. both in the orchestra and Piphat band The gong has found evidence. By focusing on the majestic drum, the majestic drum was first discovered in southern China near Yunnan and nearby provinces. Continuing to Vietnam, Cambodia, Laos, Myanmar, Malaysia, Indonesia and Thailand pointed out that The throttle drum was the origin of the gong because of the metal used to create it. The metal used to create the drums It is the same alloy as the gong that appears today. In addition to the nature of the metal alloy The evolutionary path of the throttle drum also went through its development as a musical instrument of the same family. But changing the shape that has a direction to come closer to the gong is the discovery of "Kangsadan", which is made of the same alloy, but the shape is a large circular disc. with a diameter of 2 meters, found at Wat Phra That Hariphunchai in Lamphun Province It is estimated to be around the 13th century.

== Components ==
Khong Wong Yai has 2 important components as follows:

The gong shop consists of the following sections:

1. Gong shop, made of rattan, etc., 4 lines are bent into a circle, 2 lines are bent as outer circles, and 2 are inner circles. clinging to the mahogany.

2. Luk Mahuat is made of wood to make a round wavy round, flanked by glass beads, notched head and curved cut to support the rattan at intervals throughout the circle.

3. Khon gong made of thick wood with a convex central shape. It is a slender, pointed ridge like a Bodhi leaf. tapered side Attached to the rattan on both sides one big side the other side is small.

4. The lower evening wood is a flat rectangular shape attached to the lower pair of rattan around. enough distance Some rings will cover another with a sheet of metal to drive nails.

5. Takhu wood is a small bamboo drilled into the child to block the rat bridge.

6. The Rat Bridge is a wire inserted into a circle under the takoo wood. to tie the gong's skin inside and outside.

7. A crutches on or a gong stick is a thin plank of wood that cuts the head at the end of the concave along the rattan line. to use to spread the gong to be in a beautiful circle, Usually 4 gongs are put on 1 gong stick. There are 16 large gongs, so there are 4 gongs. All 4 rattan trees will have 2 or 3 strands of rattan split around it. to support the leather tied gong and to be beautiful, which will be machined into tablets attached to the ends of the four rattan trees For ancient times, tablets were turned into legs. Trapped under the lower spread one more time.

The gongs are made of various metals. In the past, bronze was used. (Copper mixed with tin). Currently, brass is commonly used for forming by metal forging. while being so hot that it takes shape (called "gong hit") or poured liquid metal into the mold (called "Gong Lo") to form a round gong. Convex round center is the position for hitting. (called "gong buttons"), the rim is broken down to the surrounding edge (called "Chat") at the edge of the tiered side. Drill a hole in the leather string to attach it to the gong shop inside of the gong. In the area where the gong is placed, a wax-lead mixture is applied to counteract the sound. The gongs are arranged from low to high. The gong can have a high and low sound, the volume must be adjusted using the lead under the gong. If the lead is less, the vibration is high, the sound is high, but if the lead is more, the sound is low. Therefore, the sound of the gongs will be arranged in order from left to right of the person sitting in the big gong. Finally, the highest sound is the 16th ball, commonly known as "Luk Yod".

== Khong Wong Yai's sitting style and Proper storage ==
To play Khong Wong Yai, the player must sit in the middle of Khong Wong Yai.

How to sit: Sit with either folded or cross-legged. Holding a stick, hitting Khong Wong Yai. The player must gather the middle finger, ring finger and little finger. Hold the gong in the palm of your hand, use your thumb and index finger as support, keeping your index finger close to the club head.

=== Storage ===
1. To collect gongs, there should be bags or put them together on the gongs. should not be placed on the floor.

2. Cleaning Should use a dry cloth or a damp cloth to clean.

3. The gong should be placed flat on the ground. It should not be placed or leaned against the wall. Because it may cause the gong to fall and may be broken.

4. Lifting gongs should not be lifted alone because gongs are heavy and large percussion instruments. The gongs should be raised perpendicular or parallel to the ground, not on the sides.

== Khong Wong Yai Octaves ==
The two tones on which the 7 tunings are based were recorded as tones 4 and 12 of UCLA's khong wong yai. The original fundamental frequencies were 378 Hz and 760 Hz. The upper tone was edited to produce the following frequencies: 756, 762, 768, 774, 780, 786, 792, and 798 Hz. As well as the evident changes in pitch, there is beating at rates of 6 and 12 per second in the 2nd and 3rd pairs of tones, and roughness at increasing rates that correspond to differences between a 'frequency' of 2*378 = 756 Hz and the upper tones' frequencies of 774, 780, 786, 792, and 798 Hz, amounting to 18, 24, 30, 36, and 42 per second. In the figure, each octave lasts approximately 850 milliseconds, i.e., ~0.85 seconds, and differences in beating and roughness correspond to 6, 12, 18, 24, 30, 36, and 42 changes in the waveforms' amplitudes from the 2nd to the 8th pair of tones.Also audible, especially in the initial tone-pairs, is a non-harmonic partial above the upper tone that corresponds to two frequencies of much smaller amplitude ~3300 and ~3100 cents above the lower tone.

== The Effect of the Khong Wong Yai Parameters on Sounds by FEM ==
The Khong Wong Yai is called Gong in English but different in number to tune the sounds, beeswax with not exactly amount is pasted under the bossed. It is a Thai's percussion instrument usually involves some kind of striking on nipple gong. It is composed of 16 units of Gong as a circle of a rattan frame. The bossed or nipple gong embossed in center of a gong generates one key sound. Player has to percuss the gongs to create the rhythm with two hard rubber mallets or soft padded mallets as beaters and sits in the middle of the circle. The sound of the gong usually involves vibration of its own structure. The aim of this analysis is to study the eigen modes and find out the important parameters to generate sound frequency which are excited on the bossed or nipple gong by finite element analysis. In this paper the inertia relief method is to study the sound frequency of the Gong. The results show that the diameter of the Gong, the thickness of flange and the thickness of cylinder formed the Gong are important parameters which can be optimized to obtain the correct sound key.

== Hand patterns of Khong Wong Yai(basic) ==
The hand patterns for the Khong Wong Yai very much depend on the shape of the specific melody.

1.When the melody consists of two notes (or parts) simultaneously played, the right hand (R) must take the top note (or part) and the left hand (L), the lower.

2.When the melody consists of broken fourths or octaves, the right hand must take the top note, and the left hand the lower.

The hand patterns illustrated in Rules (1) and (2) are very simple instructions. But the patterns become increasingly complex when the melody appears as a single melodic line. The position of each hand is, again, fixed according to the type or shape of the specific melody.

3.When a passage consists exclusively of semiquavers, two systems of patterns can be involved. A symmetrical alternation of the right and left hands, a pattern which is imposed by the 'zigzag' profile of the passage. This indeed is the most practical way of playing this fast semiquaver passage.

== See also ==
- Traditional Thai musical instruments
- music of thailand
- Khon
- Piphat
- Mahori
