= Kong toch =

Musical instrument

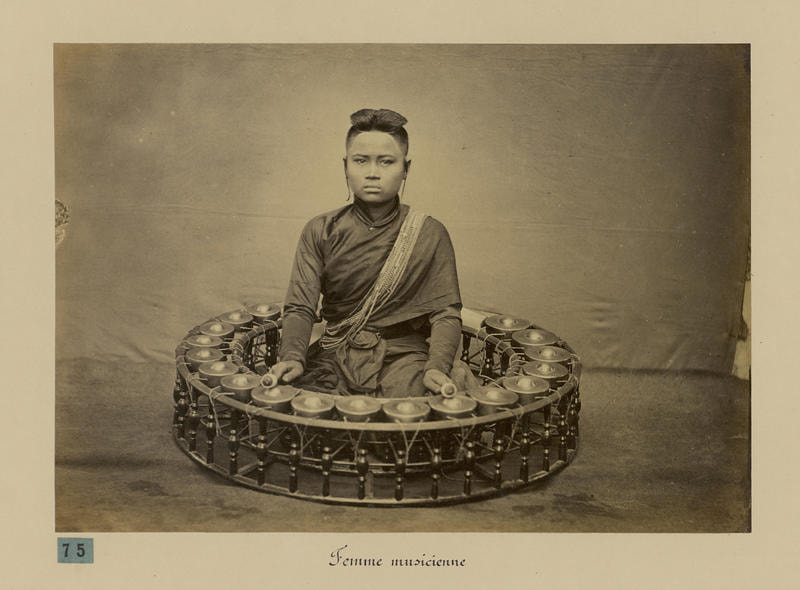
Cambodian female musician playing kong vong toch in mid 1800s. Photo taken by Emile Gsell

The kong vong toch (Khmer: គងវង់តូច or kong touch Khmer: គងតូច) is a number of gongs that are attached to a circle-shaped rack, closely resembling its larger relative, the kong thom. Both instruments belong to the percussion family of traditional Khmer instruments, along with the roneat ek, roneat dek, and roneat thung. These instruments are all performed in the pinpeat and mahaori orchestras. The kong toch is made of three parts; the frame of the gong circle, the gongs themselves, and the gong mallets.

The kong toch is analogous to the khong wong lek used in Thai.

The kong vong toch is used in Cambodian court and traditional ensemble music. Recordings of musicians of the court of Norodom Sihanouk include a performer on the kong vong toch alongside the kong vong thom, roneat and other traditional Cambodian instruments.

== History ==
Gong chimes, drums, horns in the Angkor Wat bas-reliefs Khmer temple, reign of Suryavarman II (1113-1150 AD), Siem Reap, Cambodia.

The word korng/ kong "gong" is refers to all types of gong including the flat or bossed gong, single or in a set, suspended on cords from hooks, or a gong placed over a frame. The history of these gongs can be traced in part from the epigraphy and iconography of Funan-Chenla and Angkor periods, for many can be seen carved on ancient Khmer temple.

== Construction and Design ==
Gong Frame

The frame of the gong circle is made from a rattan vine which is smoothed and rounded into shape. Four lengths of the vine are taken to make one frame. The lengths are divided into two pairs, a shorter pair for the inner circle and a longer pair for the outer. The instrument is held up with 16 supports, made of neang nuen, krennoonf, or beng wood. The gong circle is held together with six crossbars, designed to keep the distance between the inner and outer frames fixed. Copper wires are wrapped around the length of each support post, one on the inner and one on the outer.

Gong Heads/Mallets

There are 16 gong heads, which cover a range of pitches. They are rounded and flat in shape with a raised knob in the middle, known as the nipple. The nipple is crucial to the sound, as this is the part being struck by the player. In addition to this, the gongs are tuned by sticking promor (a lead and wax combination) to the underside of the nipple. Two holes are drilled on either side of the gong so it can be suspended in the frame with copper wire. The same gong mallets are used for the kong toch and the kong thom. The mallets have a 25 cm long stick. The heads are made from the earlier mentioned promor, which is then wrapped in four or five layers of cloth and stitched with nylon thread.

Tuning

The kong toch's 16 gong heads are tuned accordingly: (from lowest to highest pitch) ·D ·Eb ·F ·G ·A ·Bb ·C ·D ·E ·F ·G ·A ·Bb ·C ·D

·E

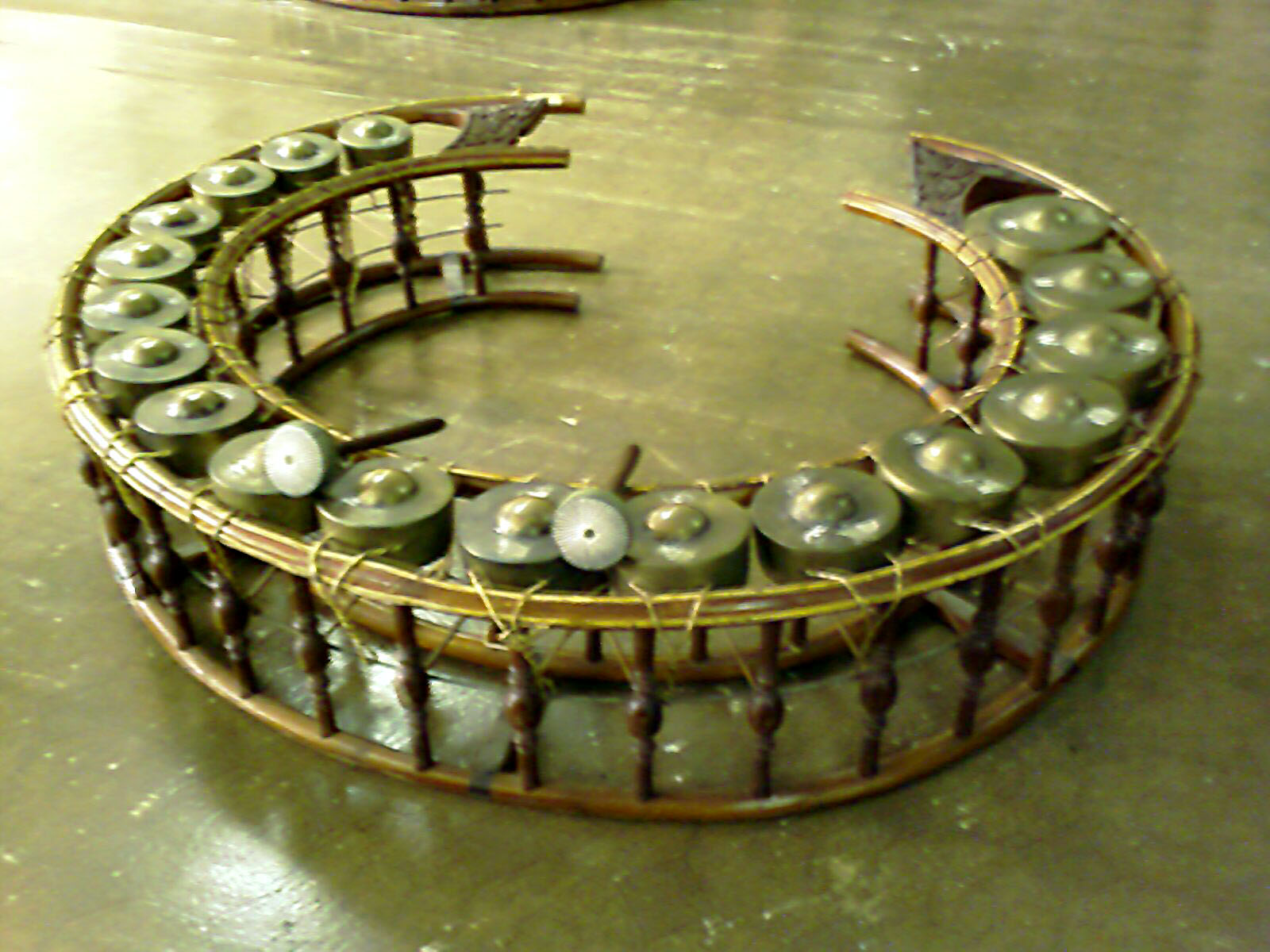
Thai khong wong lek, equivalent instrument to Cambodian Kong toch.

== See also ==
- Pinpeat
- Kong thom
- Music of Cambodia
