= Roneat =

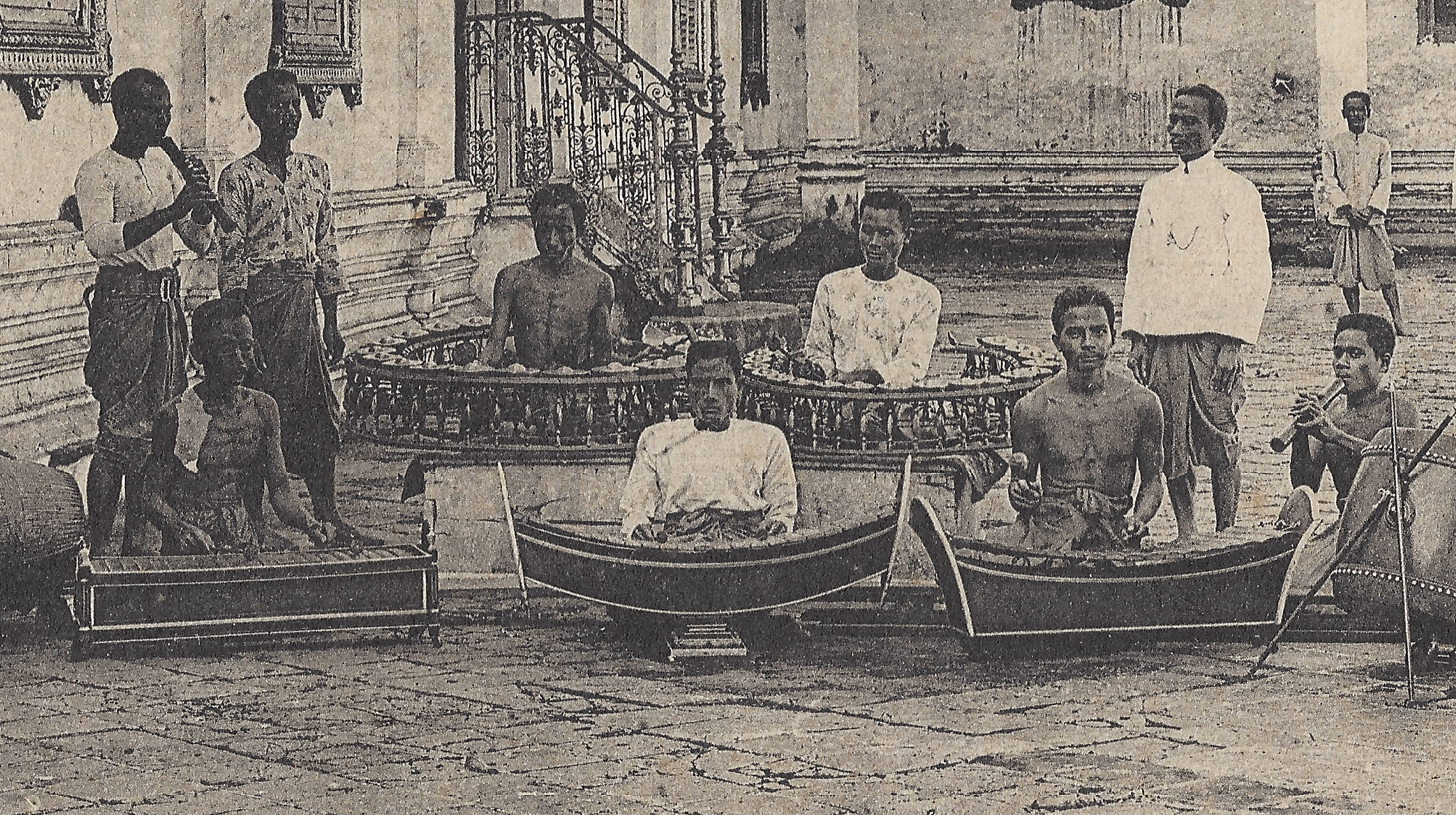
Three genres of roneats accompanied in Cambodian royal orchestra, pinpeat, in 1907, Phnom Penh Royal Palace. Middle front.

Roneat (Khmer: រនាត, rônéat [rɔniət]) is the generic Khmer word for referring to several types of xylophones used in traditional Cambodian music; the pinpeat and mohaori.

Roneat may refers to several Cambodian xylophone types such as roneat thmor, roneat ek, roneat thung, roneat dek, and roneat thaong.

== Etymology ==
The word "roneat" is a Khmer word for the bamboo xylophone, which is an ancient musical instrument of Cambodia. According to the Khmer national dictionary, roneat means xylophone and is described as "the percussive musical instrument that has a long body where its bars are made from bamboo or other good quality woods or metal bars striking with a pair of two roneat sticks played in the pinpeat and mohaori orchestras.

The Garland Handbook of Southeast Asian Music edited by Terry E. Miller and Sean Williams, argued that the word roneat is a Khmer generic term that refers to xylophones or metallophones — idiophones, with bars of bamboo, wood, or metal. The word roneat derives from the word "roneap" which means bamboo strips or bamboo bars. It's quite possible in Khmer language and word derivations as the note bars of this instrument are made mostly from bamboo bars or strips.

Moreover, a research compiled by Cambodian professor Hun Sarnin indicated that the Khmer word roneat, which probably derived from the Sanskrit word raghunâ tha-vinâ, appeared since the early Cambodian history during the Funan kingdom.

== History ==
Music has been part of Khmer daily life since at least the first Khmer kingdom (Funan), as music along with dancing were frequently performed in religious temples, local festivities, and royal ceremony. Therefore, the roneat is thought to have originated from before the Angkor empire. As the sister musical instrument of the roneat ek, the roneat thung was already a member of the pinpeat orchestra before Angkor period.

One of the oldest xylophones in mainland Southeast Asia can be found in Lam Dong Province, Central Highlands, Vietnam. This early instrument was known in native language as the goonglu. Researchers have found many stone xylophones in Vietnam's Central Highland where the Mon-Khmer indigenous minority, the K'ho lives. The Koho people knew how to use the stone xylophone long ago; some stone xylophones found there were dated as being about 2500 years old.

In Cambodia, this type of prehistoric stone xylophone, known as roneat thmor in Khmer, was also found in a site known as Along Tra Reach in Kampong Chhnang province, Central Cambodia. However, the age is unknown, but is probably as old as those found in Vietnam's Central Highland eastward of Cambodia.

Although, no carving has been found yet, but this does not prelude the possibility that roneat may have been used by the ancient Khmers as it was considered to be common or folk instruments and the musical instruments portrayed at Angkor are composed primarily of stringed and woodwind instruments with rhythmic percussion, usually accompanying dancing.

Fortunately, recently, more than 200 hidden paintings were revealed on the wall of Angkor Wat with the help of new technology. Among them, there is a clear depiction of a Khmer traditional orchestra in which the musical instruments are clearly visible through the computer-enhancement. This orchestra includes two hanging gongs, a drum, kong vong thom, roneat, and trumpet. This new discovery is probably the oldest depiction of roneat genres in Cambodia.

According to another source, Cambodian roneat genres were derived from the Javanese gamelan musical instruments which influenced the Khmer musical instrument in the early Angkorian period, and which spread from Kampuchea further northwest to Myanmar. The last monarch of Khmer Kingdom of Chenla King Jayavarman II, who returned from the Javanese Court in 802 a.d., began the grandiose consecration ritual (the concept of Devaraja or God-King on sacred Mount Mahendraparvata), now known as Phnom Kulen, to celebrate the independence of Kambuja (Cambodia) from Javanese dominion. He became the first emperor of the Khmer Empire, as verified by the Sdok Kak Thom inscription. Throughout the history of Cambodian music, especially in the post-Angkorian period, Roneat genres such as roneat ek and roneat thung usually appears in various mural paintings and always represent in the pinpeat or mahori orchestra.

== Types of roneat ==
=== Roneat thmor ===
The roneat thmor (Khmer: រនាតថ្ម) or literally stone xylophone is thought to be the earliest form of xylophone.

These stone musical instruments can be found in various locations. Many were found in Vietnam's Tay Nguyen or Central Highlands, eastward of Cambodia, played by the Koho people. They are aged to some 2500 years old.

In Cambodia, two roneat thmor tone-bars were also found in Kampong Chhnang, in Central Cambodia. Each of these stone xylophone bars are more than 1,5 meter long which is a whole body of roneat thmor, unlike those separating pieces of stone xylophone bars found in Vietnam. These stone xylophone bars generate the same sound as gongs and other roneat genre, but their sound is quite louder. By observing its physical appearance, we can identify their head and end as the end khaols of other roneat genres. By this, researcher can easily identify the sound notes. These stone xylophone bars were likely made from the same stone because the sound note variance of both stone xylophone bars from the head to their ends share similar sound notes. The age of these stone xylophone bars are unknown but probably as old as those found in the region or probably much older.

=== Roneat ek ===
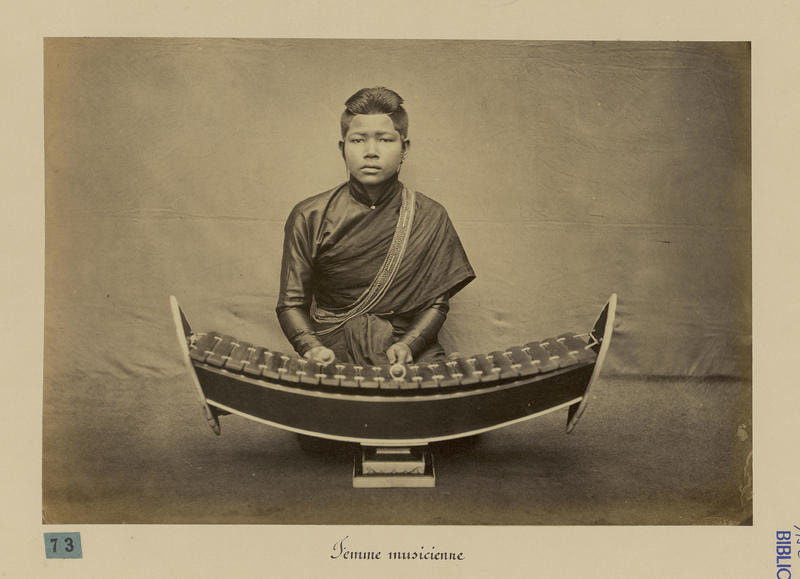
Cambodian female musician playing roneat ek in mid 1800s. Taken by Emile Gsell

The roneat Ek or roneat aek is a xylophone used in the Khmer classical music of Cambodia. It is built in the shape of a curved, rectangular shaped boat. It has twenty-one thick bamboo or hard wood bars that are suspended from strings attached to the two walls. They are cut into pieces of the same width, but of different lengths and thickness. Originally these instruments were highly decorated with inlay and carvings on the sides of the sound box. Now they are simpler. The Roneat is played in the pinpeatensemble. In that ensemble, sits on the right of the roneat thung, a lower-pitched xylophone. The roneat ek is the analogous equivalent to the Thai xylophone called ranat ek, and the Burmese bamboo xylophone called "pattala".

Roneat ek play significant role in both pinpeat and mahori orchestra. Throughout the history of Cambodian music, especially in the post-Angkorian period, roneat ek usually appears in various mural paintings and always represent in both traditional orchestras due to its significant function and musical contribution.

=== Roneat Thung ===
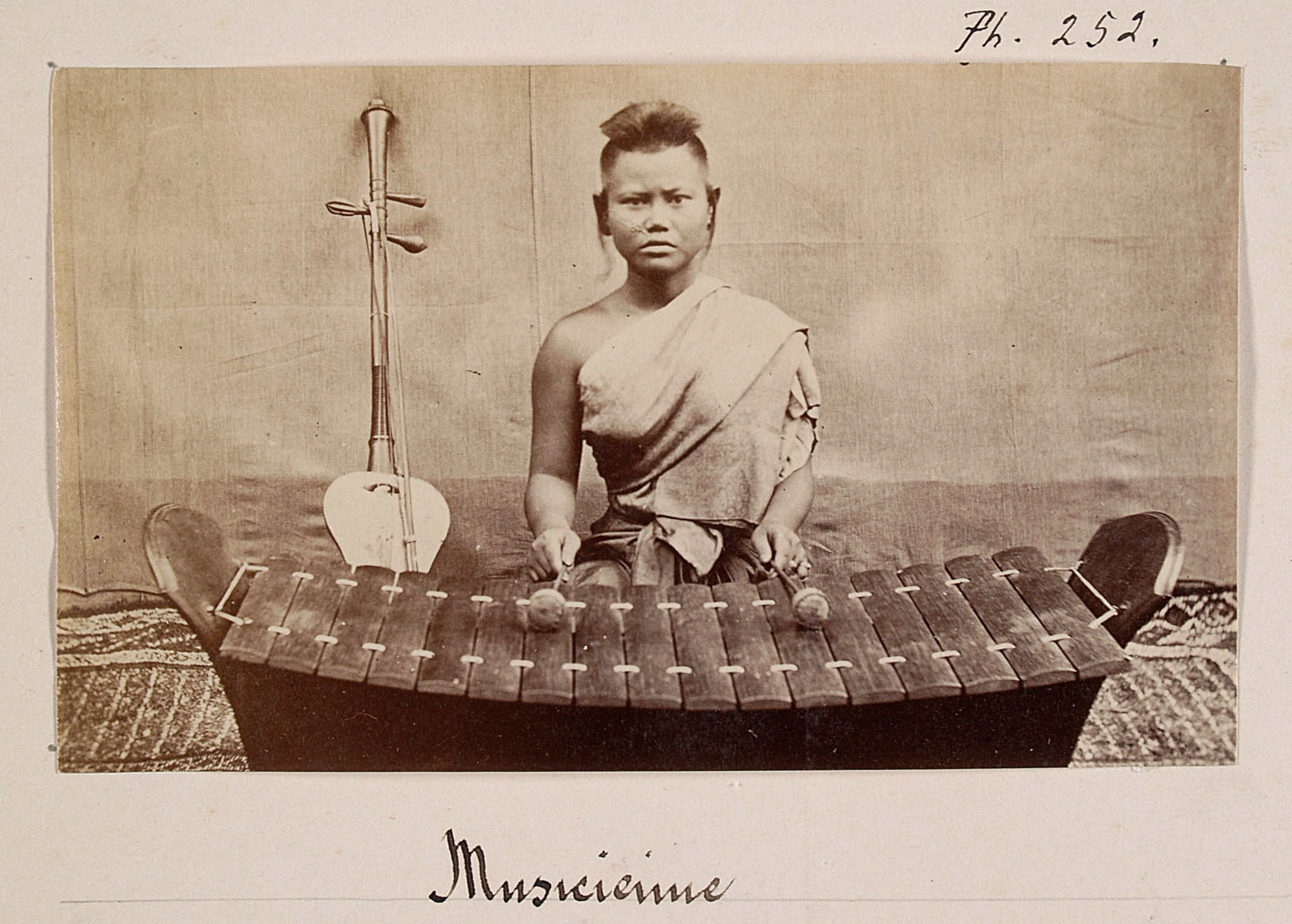
Cambodian female musician playing roneat thung in mid 1800s. Taken by Emile Gsell

The roneat thung is a low-pitched xylophone used in the Khmer classical music of Cambodia. It is built in the shape of a curved, rectangular shaped boat. This instrument plays an important part in the pinpeat ensemble. The roneat thung is placed on the left of the roneat ek, a higher-pitched xylophone.

The roneat thung, sister musical instrument to the roneat ek, was part of the pinpeat orchestra before the Angkor period.

=== Roneat Dek ===
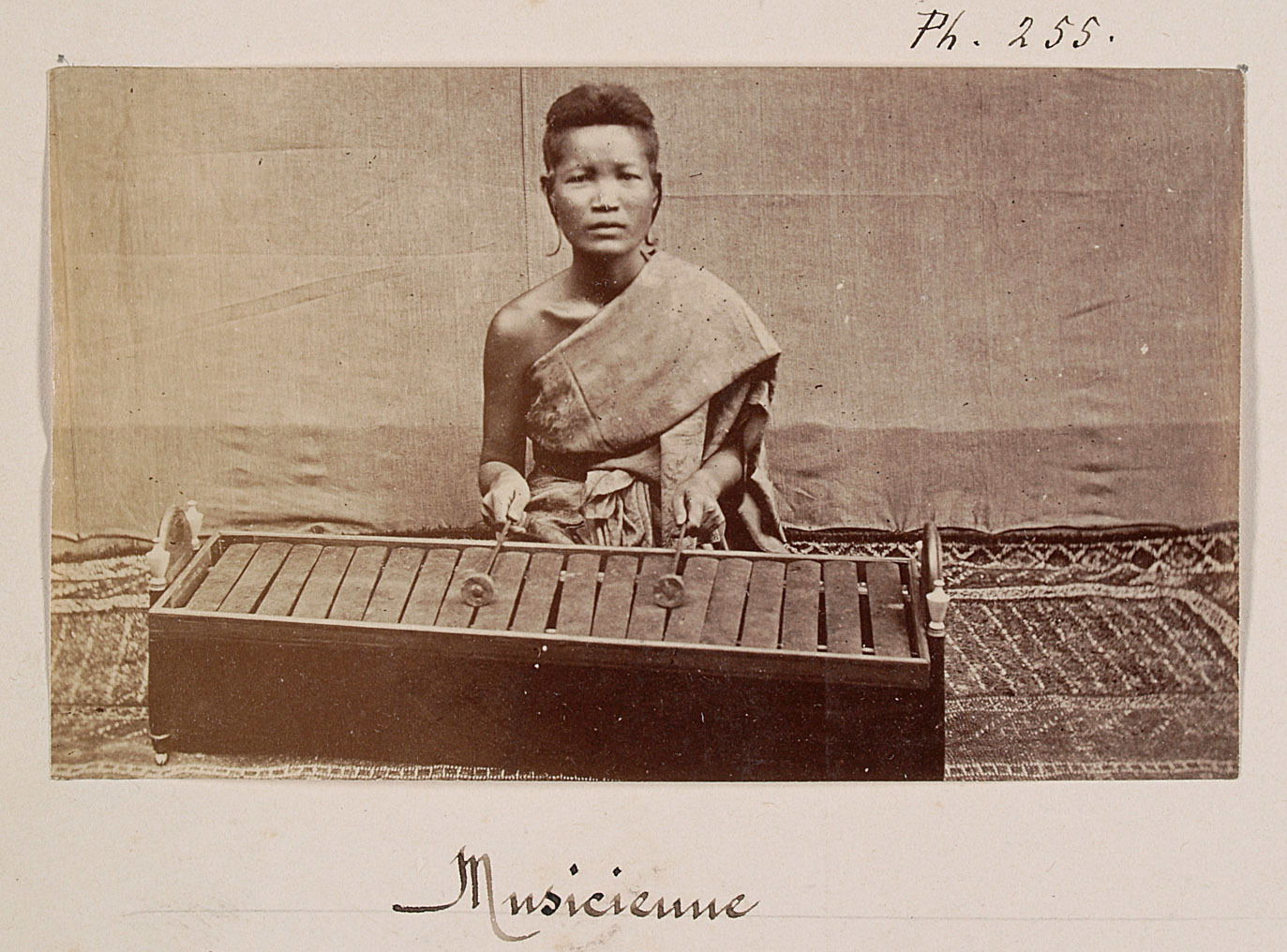
Cambodian female musician playing roneat dek in mid 1800s. Taken by Emile Gsell

The roneat dek is a Cambodian metallophone, comparable to the roneat ek. It is an ancient instrument made of 21 blackened-iron bars. It may be used in the pinpeat ensemble and mahaori orchestra. It is believed to have originated from the Royal Courts before the Angkor period.

=== Roneat Thaong ===
See Variation of roneat dek
