= Roneat thung =

Cambodian low-pitched xylophone

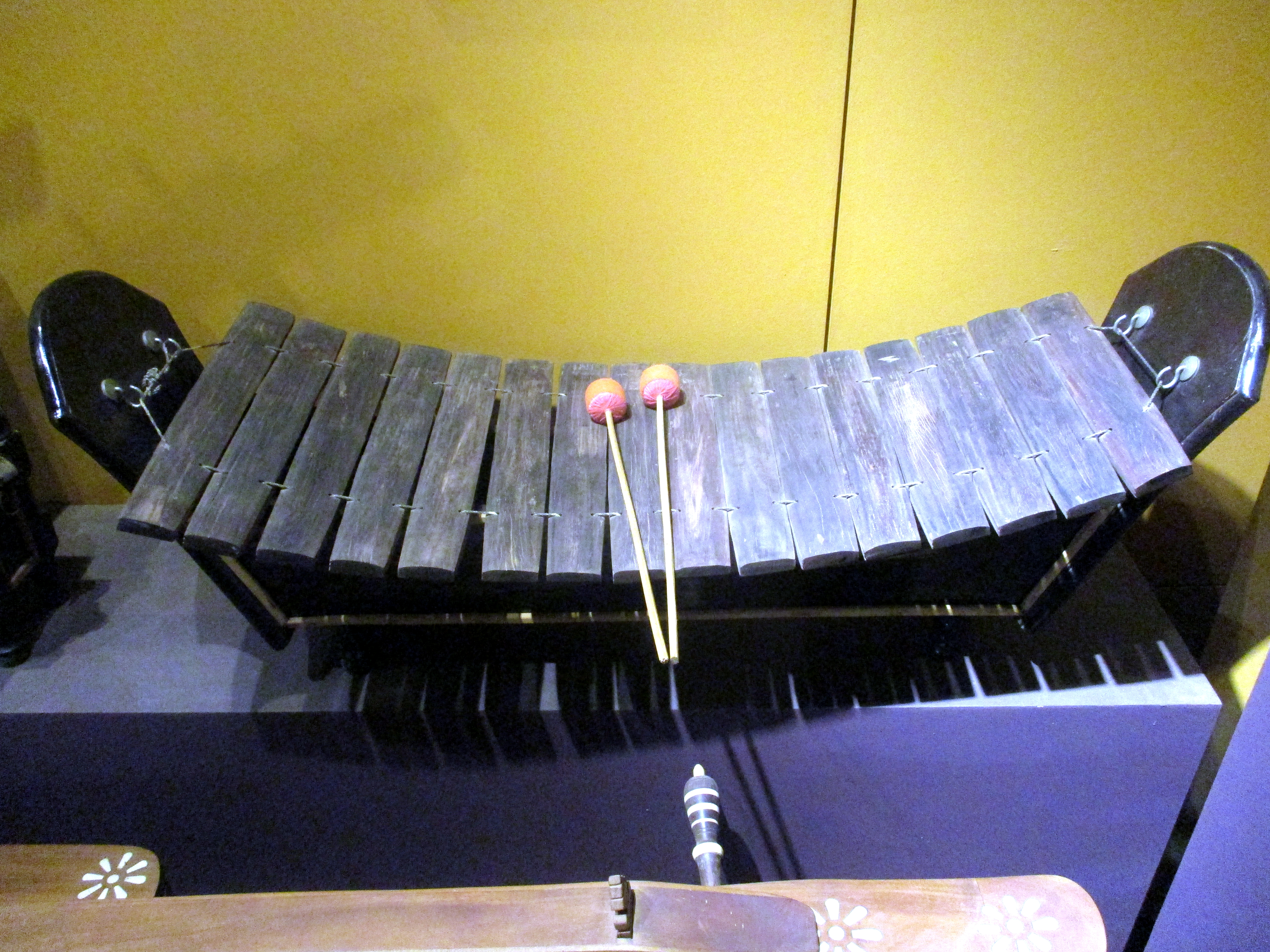
- Roneat thung at the "Sounds of Angkor" exhibition in Тheam's Gallery, Siem Reap, Cambodia.
- Other names: Roneat thum
- Classification: Percussion (idiophone)

Related instruments
- Ranat thum, ranat thum lek, ranat ek

The roneat thung or roneat thum (Khmer: រនាតធុង) is a low-pitched xylophone used in the Khmer classical music of Cambodia. It is built in the shape of a curved, rectangular boat. This instrument plays an important part in the Pinpeat ensemble. The roneat Thung is placed on the left of the roneat ek, a higher-pitched xylophone. The Roneat Thung is analogous to the ranat thum of Thai.

== Etymology ==
Roneat means xylophone where thung literally mean [wooden] container in Khmer. This may derived from the shape of this type of xylophone which shaped like a rectangular wooden container.

Terry E. Miller and Sean Williams in their book The Garland Handbook of Southeast Asian Music, Roneat Thung is better called Roneat thomm/ thum which literally means "large xylophone". This name may designates the fact that roneat thum's resonator and note bars are larger and longer than those of roneat ek.

== History ==
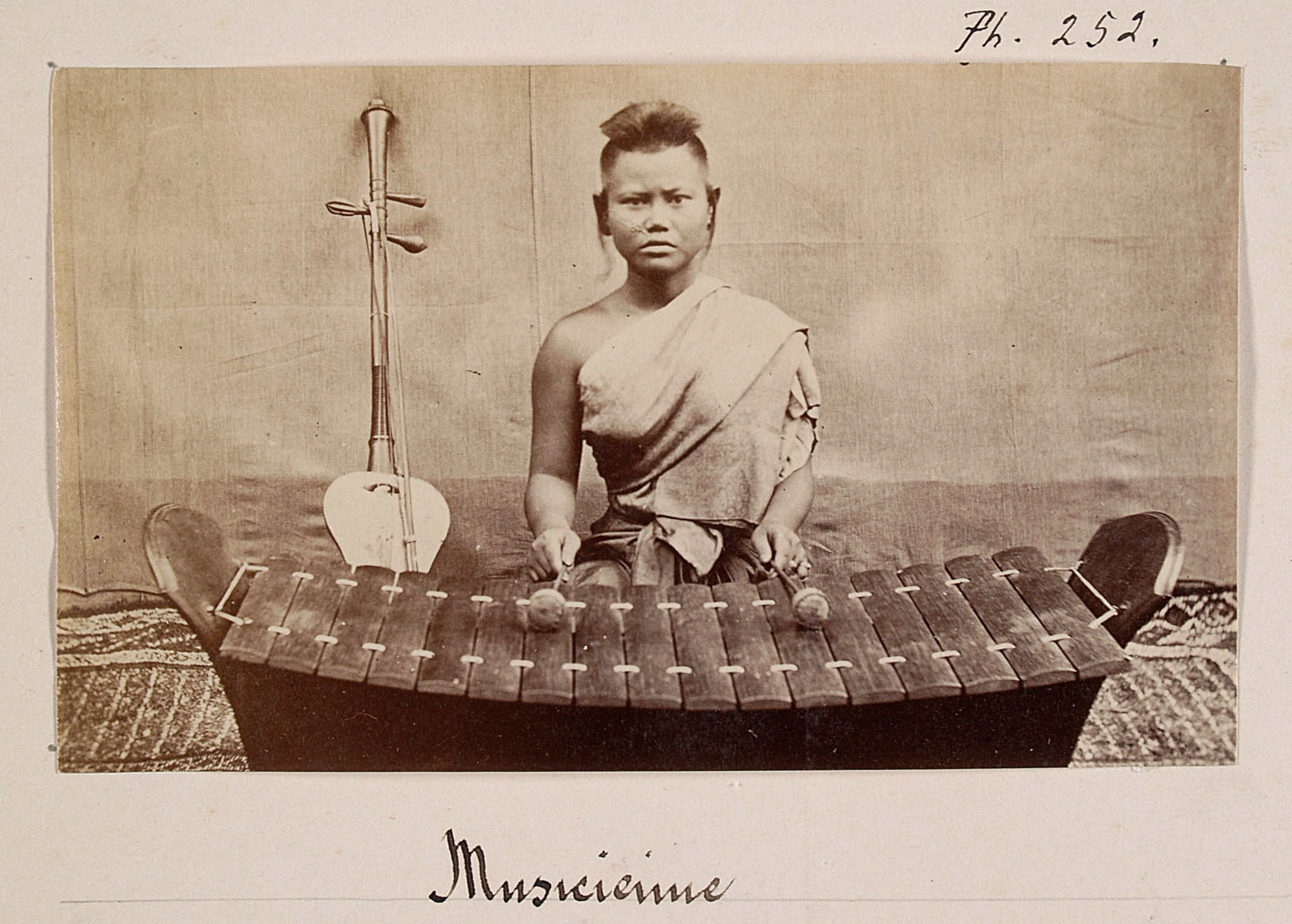
Khmer female musician with roneat thung taken by Emile Gsell in the mid-1800s.

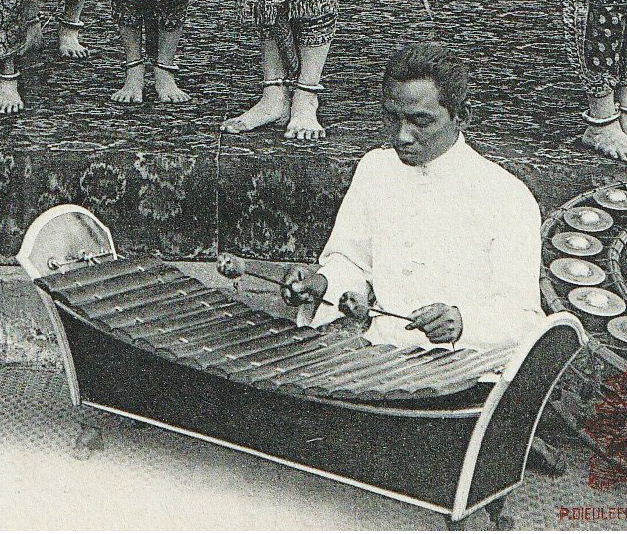
Man playing a roneat thung on a pre-1900 postcard by Pierre Dieulefils.

Roneat Thung, the sister musical instrument of Roneat Ek, was already established itself as a member of the Pinpeat orchestra since before the Angkor period.

According to another source, Cambodian Roneat genres were derived from the Javanese gamelan musical instruments which influenced the Khmer musical instrument in the early Angkorian period which spread from Kampuchea further northwest to Myanmar. Specifically, Roneat Thung is identical to the Indonesian and Malay gambang kayu.

Throughout the history of Cambodian music, especially in the post-Angkorian period, Roneat thung usually appears in various mural paintings along with Roneat ek and always represent in the Pinpeat or Mahori orchestra.

== Structure ==
The shape of Roneat Thung is thought to be modeled from a riverboat as Roneat Ek as well.

Roneat thung's rectangular trough-resonator measures about 50 inches long supported by four short legs. While the end-pieces of the roneat aek and the roneat daek are flat and straight, the roneat thung end-pieces are curved slightly outward. The roneat thung has sixteen bamboo or wooden bars, measuring about 18.75 inches (low pitch) to 15.25 inches (high pitch) in length. The width of the bars (low and high) is approximately 2.5 inches and the thickness of both is about 0.75 inch. As the materials, which are used to make the bars, are the same as the roneat aek, the same tuning blobs are also utilized. Like the roneat aek, the roneat thung bars are suspended with two cords running through holes in each bar and placed on two hooks at each of the two curved end-pieces that are connected to the resonator.

Only soft mallets are used to play the roneat thung, either indoor or outdoor. While the mallet handles of the roneat thung are about the same length as those of the roneat aek, their disc are larger and thicker. Each measure approximately 1.75 inches in diameter and about 1.5 inches in thickness. The range of the roneat thung overlaps that of the roneat aek, one octave lower. Due to its stylistic playing, the sixteen bars cover a range of music of over two octaves, a range that is wider than that of the roneat aek. The role assigned to the roneat thung is to counter the melody. The roneat thung plays a line almost identical to that of the korng thomm, except in a lak (vivacious, funny, comic) fashion.

== Significance ==
Roneat Thung has significant function in Khmer traditional orchestra both Pinpeat and Mohaori. But the Roneat Thung used in Mahori has to have higher sound (one sound) than the Roneat Thung used in Pinpeat starting from the first bar note.

According to Cambodian traditional musicians, roneat thung has the same representation as Roneat Ek. Roneat Ek represents female naga or dragon where roneat thung itself represents male naga in which both nagas has to be next to one another or pairing as accompanied in Khmer traditional orchestras.

== See also ==
- Mohaori
- Roneat ek
- Roneat dek
- Music of Cambodia
- Traditional Cambodian instruments
