= Roneat ek =

Musical instrument

Roneat Ek
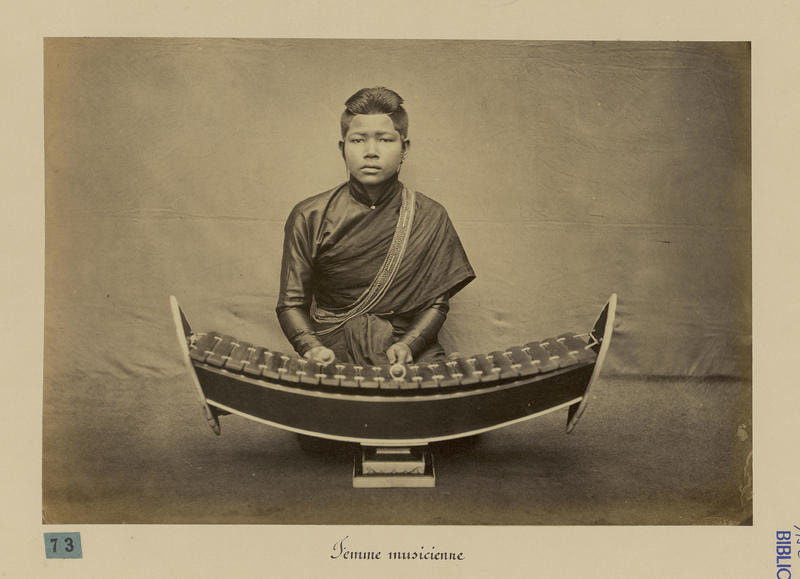
- Photograph of a Cambodian female musician playing the roneat ek (c. mid 1800s), photographed by Emile Gsell
- Other names: Roneat Aek, Roneat Rut
- Classification: Percussion (idiophone)

Sound sample
- Music which includes the playing of the roneat ek as a primary element

The Roneat Ek (Khmer: រនាតឯក, romanized: Rôniat Aek, Khmer pronunciation: [rɔː.niət aek]; also called Roneat Rut (Note: Khmer: រនាតរត់, romanized: Rôniat Rǒt; Khmer pronunciation: [rɔː.niət rɔt])) is a xylophone used in the Khmer classical music of Cambodia. It is built in the shape of a curved, rectangular shaped boat. It has twenty-one thick bamboo or hard wood bars that are suspended from strings attached to the two walls. They are cut into pieces of the same width, but of different lengths and thickness. Originally these instruments were highly decorated with inlay and carvings on the sides of the sound box. Now they are simpler. The Roneat is played in the Pinpeat ensemble. In that ensemble, sits on the right of the Roneat Thung, a lower-pitched xylophone. The roneat ek is the analogous equivalent to the Thai xylophone called ranat ek, and the Burmese bamboo xylophone called "pattala".

== Etymology ==
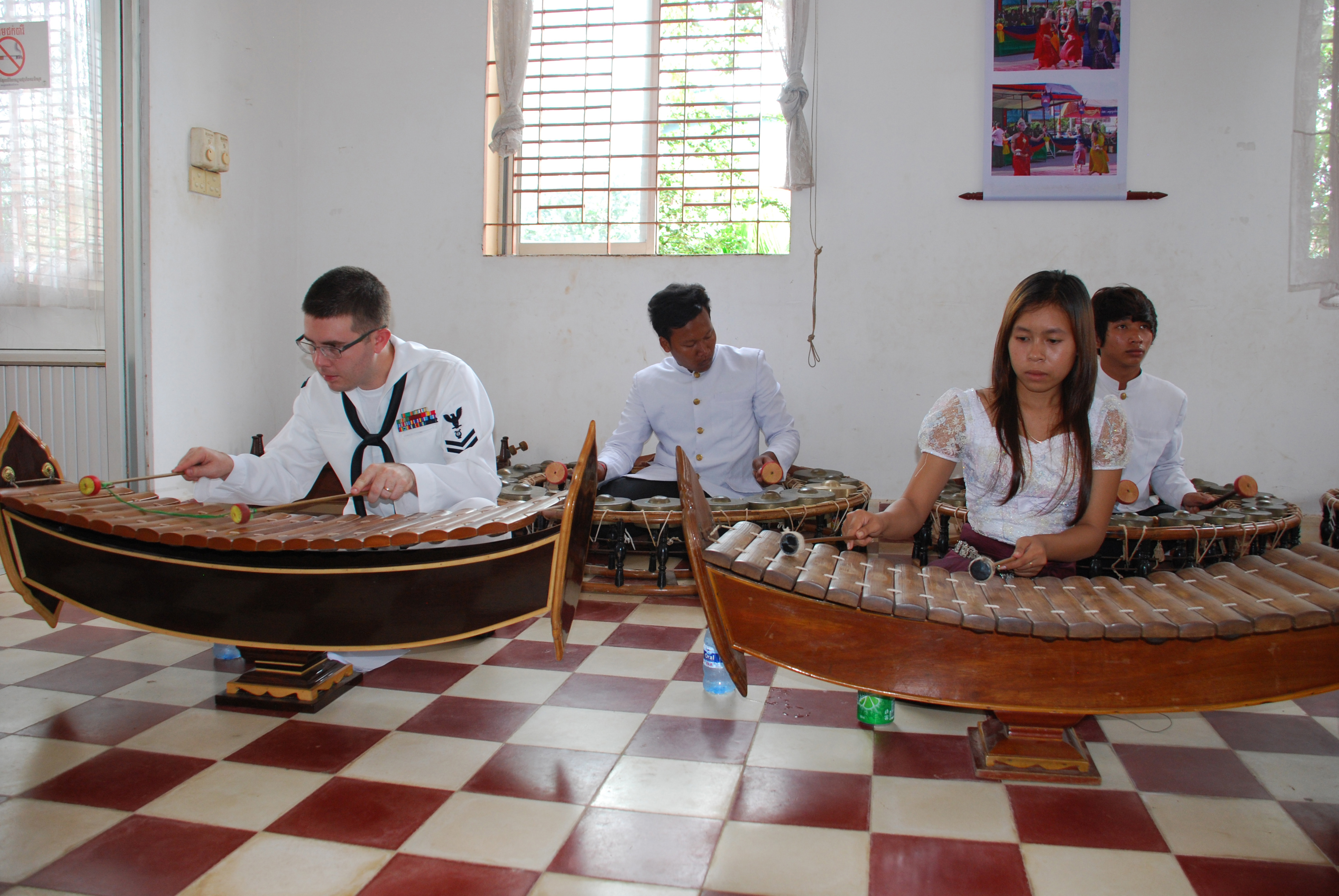
A US Navy musician and a woman both play roneat ek xylophones while two men play kon von thom and kong toch gong chimes in the back row.

The word "roneat" is a Khmer word for the bamboo xylophone, which is an ancient musical instrument of Cambodia. According to the Khmer national dictionary, roneat means xylophone and is described as "the percussive musical instrument that has a long body where its bars are made from bamboo or other good quality woods or metal bars striking with a pair of two roneat sticks played in the Pinpeat and Mohaori Orchestras."

According to the Garland Handbook of Southeast Asian Music edited by Terry E. Miller and Sean Williams, the word roneat is a Khmer generic term refers to xylophones or metallophones-idiophones, with bars of bamboo, wood, or metal. The word roneat derives from the word "roneap" which means bamboo strips or bamboo bars. It's quite possible in Khmer language and its word derivations as the note bars of this Roneat are made mostly from bamboo bars or strips.

Moreover, a research compiled by Cambodian professor Hun Sarnin indicated that the Khmer word roneat, which probably derived from the Sanskrit word raghunâ tha-vinâ, appeared since the early Cambodian history during the Funan kingdom.

While the Khmer word "ek or aek" is derived from the Sanskrit word ekam or Pali word eka, which has several meanings such as first, supreme, significant, or the leading,...

When put together, the word roneat ek means "the significant or the leading xylophone". This indicates its role as the leading musical instrument in the Khmer traditional Pinpeat and Mahori orchestras, and its role starting a piece of music and cueing the other instruments.

Moreover, roneat ek is sometimes known as roneat rut as well, which literally means the running xylophone, maybe due to its technique of making sound that runs from one note to the other while playing or from one bamboo bar to the other.

== History ==
Music has been part of Khmer daily life since at least the first Khmer kingdom Funan, as music along with dancing were performed in religious temples. Therefore, Roneat is thought to have originated since before Angkor empire. As Roneat Thung, the sister musical instrument of Roneat Ek was already established itself as the member of the Pinpeat orchestra since before Angkor period, so researchers believed that Roneat Ek is thought to be predated the Angkorian period as well. One of the oldest xylophone nearby Cambodia can be found in Lam Dong Province, Central Highland, Vietnam. Early form of xylophone are in the form of Stone Xylophone or Known in native language as Goonglu. Researchers have found many stone xylophones in Vietnam's Central Highland where Mon-Khmer indigenous minority, the K'ho lives. The Koho people know how to use the stone xylophone longs ago where some stone xylophones found there aged to some 2500 years. In Cambodia, this type of prehistoric stone xylophone or known as Roneat Thmor in Khmer was also found in a site known as Along Tra Reach in Kampong Chhnang province, Central Cambodia. Each stone xylophone is more than 1,5 meter long. However, the age is unknown, but probably as old as those found in Vietnam's Central Highland or much older.

Although, no carving has been found yet, but this does not prelude the possibility that Roneat may have been used by the ancient Khmers as it was considered to be common or folk instruments and the musical instruments portrayed at Angkor are composed primarily of stringed and woodwind instruments with rhythmic percussion, usually accompanying dancing. However, recently, more than 200 images were revealed on the wall of Angkor Wat with the help of new technology. Among them, there is a depiction of Khmer traditional orchestra which the musical instruments are clearly visible through the computer-enhanced version. These Khmer musical instruments includes the two hanging gongs, drum, Kong Vong Thom, roneat, oboe, and (very long) trumpet. This new discovery is probably the oldest depiction of Roneat genres in Cambodia.According to other source, Cambodian Roneat genres were derived from the Javanese gamelan musical instruments which influenced the Khmer musical instrument in the early Angkorian period which spread from Kampuchea further northwest to Myanmar. This proofed the historical connection to the origin of Roneat genre in the early Angkor period as the last monarch of Khmer Kingdom of Chenla King Jayavarman II was returned from the Javanese Court in 802 AD and began the grandiose consecration ritual or the concept of Devaraja or God-King concept on sacred Mount Mahendraparvata, now known as Phnom Kulen, to celebrate the independence of Kambuja (Cambodia) from Javanese dominion and eventually became the first Khmer King of Khmer Empire, as verified by the Sdok Kak Thom inscription.

Throughout the history of Cambodian music, especially in the post-Angkorian period, Roneat Ek usually appears in various mural paintings and always represent in the Pinpeat or Mahori orchestra due to its significant function and musical contribution.

== Structure ==
Roneat Ek structure can be classified into the body or the sound box, the notes or bars, and the mallets or sticks.

- The body or sound box of Roneat is the lower part of the instrument made from good quality woods such as neang nuonnor beng etc. which is capable of withstanding the weight and tension of the 21 strung bamboo bars. The body has parallel walls curved up at both ends to a height of 20 cm, and having a length of 100 cm, but the size may vary to some preference. These are joined by plank underneath; the floor of the body, and two end wals called khaol. The body of Roneat Ek is decorated with inlaid ivory in beautiful floral and other designs, however the decorations can be varied to where the Roneat Ek is being made. For example, Roneat Ek used to perform music in royal palace may has finer decoration and design.
- The notes or bars forms the upper surface of the instrument. Roneat Ek has 21 notes made of krannoong, beng, neang nuon, or popularly bamboo wood. All 21 notes of this instrument are bored twice at each end and laced in order onto a nylon cord, then stretched out and suspended between its end khaol without being allowed to touch the rims of the sound box. While, promor, made from a mixture of wax and lead, is stuck on the underside of both ends of the notes at the pueh (thickest point), in order to alter the pitch of the notes and bring them into tune with the Khmer musical scale. The first note, at the far right of the player, has the highest pitch and is 25 cm long. The notes are each slightly longer in order until the 21st note which is the lowest and is 40 cm long. Roneat Ek is played in the Pinpeat or Mahori orchestra, simply by playing in the different keys required by these orchestras, but this does not necessitate the use of accidentals or key signatures.
- Roneat Sticks. There are two Roneat Sticks used to play this instrument. They are made of the same kind of wood as the body, without to long smooth, rounded sticks, slightly larger in diameter that the chopsticks. Their length is 38 cm. The stick head is a lump of promor (wax and lead), which is in the shape of a flattened sphere and covered with two or three layers of cloth bound tightly with thread, called me lumtun, used in the Mahori orchestra.

== Concept Design ==
There are several arguments regarding the shape of Roneat Ek. Some researchers argued that the shape of this musical instrument is modeled from the shape of Khmer river boat. The others believed that this musical instrument is resembled the peacock as its end khaols look like the peacock's tail when spreads. However, according to the Khmer ancient musical specialists, the Cambodian Roneat Ek shape is representing the Naga or dragon as the stand supporting the instrument body representing two entwining nagas' tails, the body of Roneat Ek represents two diverging nagas, the two end khaols of it representing two hooding nagas, and the note bars represent nagas' scales.

According to Ouknha Moha Thipadei Meas Ni, the chief of Cambodian Royal Orchestra "His grandfather said this Roneat genre is a Khmer invention since ancient times. First, Khmer people took the bamboo bars used in house construction cutting into short pieces and strike them to make sound for entertainment. Later, the bamboo pieces were tied and laced in order, then stretched out and suspended. Then, the set of laced bamboo bars was placed on the naga-shaped body carved from wood and the later body of Roneat still represent naga as the Khmer people praised and worshiped nagas [since ancient time]. The instrument of Roneat Ek was accompanied with the Khmer pin since the early time when pin was introduced to Cambodia." This explanation is quite relevant because nagas have been praised and worshiped in Cambodian society since ancient time and naga is even believed to be associated with Khmer national origin.

In other explanation, according to Cambodian traditional musicians, Roneat Ek itself represents female naga or dragon where Roneat Thung represents male naga in which both nagas have to be next to one another or pairing as accompanied in Khmer traditional orchestras.

== Role in Khmer traditional orchestras ==
Roneat ek playing.

Roneat Ek plays significant function in both Pinpheat and Mahori orchestra. According to Cambodian traditional custom, Roneat Ek was designated depending on the orchestra where it accompanied. The Roneat Ek used in Pinpeat has to have lower sound than the Roneat Ek used in Mahori 1 Orchestra where the first note bar is the high-sound point.

Roneat Ek usually accompanied by Roneat Thung in both Khmer orchestras. The first is considered the female voice and the second the male one. The Roneat Ek plays the melody with the mallets following each other at the octave. On the Roneat Thung plays the accompaniment according to a dissociated playing between the two hands.

Many Khmer musicians think that the Roneat Ek plays the melodic line. In fact, it plays variations of the melody, which is usually carried by a vocalist or a Sralai player. Stylistically speaking, the Roneat Ek is played in octaves, less commonly in fourths or fifths. The twenty-one bars of the Roneat Ek provide a three-octave range, but because it is played in octaves (between the left and right hands), it only covers a two-octave range.

== See also ==
- Mohaori
- Khmer Traditional Musical Instruments
- Roneat Thung
- Roneat Dek
- Kong Vong Thom
- Kong Vong Touch

== See also ==
- Roneat dek
- Roneat thung
- Traditional Cambodian musical instruments
- Music of Cambodia
