= Mohaori =

Traditional musical ensemble of Cambodia

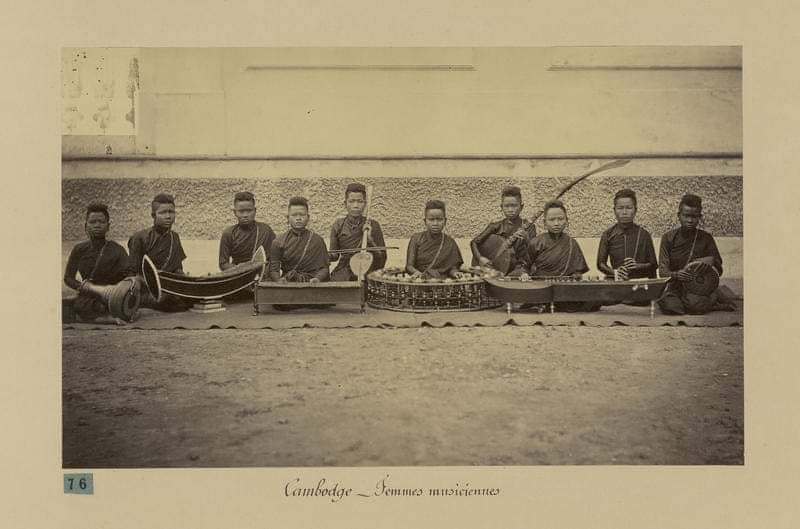
Female band of Cambodian Mohaori Orchestra, mid 1800s. Emile Gsell

Mohaori (Khmer: មហោរី, romanized: Môhaori; Khmer pronunciation: [mɔː.hao.ri]) is one of the traditional musical ensembles of Cambodia. This traditional ensemble is known in full name as Vong Phleng Mohaori. (Note: Khmer: វង់ភ្លេងមហោរី, romanized: Vǒng Phleng Môhaori, Khmer pronunciation: [ʋɔŋ pʰleːŋ mɔː.hao.ri]; lit. 'mohaori musical ensemble') It composed of many kinds of musical instruments, but today it is more specifically applied to a small ensemble of wind, stringed, and percussion musical instruments.

This musical art is thought to be predated Angkorian period and probably dated back to as early as the 9th century. Mohaori became more popular and further developed in the Post-Angkorian era until the present days. The songs and lyrics of Mohaori music normally depict the beauty and admiration of nature, and the confession of love. The Music played by this Khmer ensemble is gentle and fluid which is suitable for an entertainment in Cambodian social and traditional events. Nowadays, Mohaori is still a popular Khmer traditional music played in various occasions and festivities.

== Etymology ==
The word Mohaori or Mahori is derived from the sanskrit word "Manohari" for female and "Manohara" for male and came into existence since before Angkorian period. Based on Khmer inscription, K 400 dated in 9th century, these words are the name of the male and female servant of Devatas (angels) which have the role of playing music. Moreover, the stone inscription K 806 of Pre Rup temple dated in 10th century, also associated with these words which used in the poetry "Kavei Manohar" means Manohara author.

The word Mohaori is derived from these words: Manohara > Manohari and eventually became Mohaori until today. Based on this Khmer artistic evidence, this Mohaori art or ensemble is the name of an art which dated back more than a thousand year. Although, there were many obstacles (wars, foreign invasions,...) the life of Khmer people have been closely linked with this art and catch up with it until now.

Moreover, based on a research Music and Dance in Ancient Cambodia compiled by Saveros Pou as confirmed as evidence in Old Khmer Epigraphy, the Manohara and Manohari were name of favourite (music) artist that does not exist in the present day. The form of Mahaori illustrated through the Mohaori assemble accompanied by soft-sounded musical instruments which make the liseners feel entertained, happy, and release stress.

In Khmer language, Mohaori is also the name of a kind of bird with beautiful and melodious voice which its name shared the same characteristic of Mohaori music.

== History ==
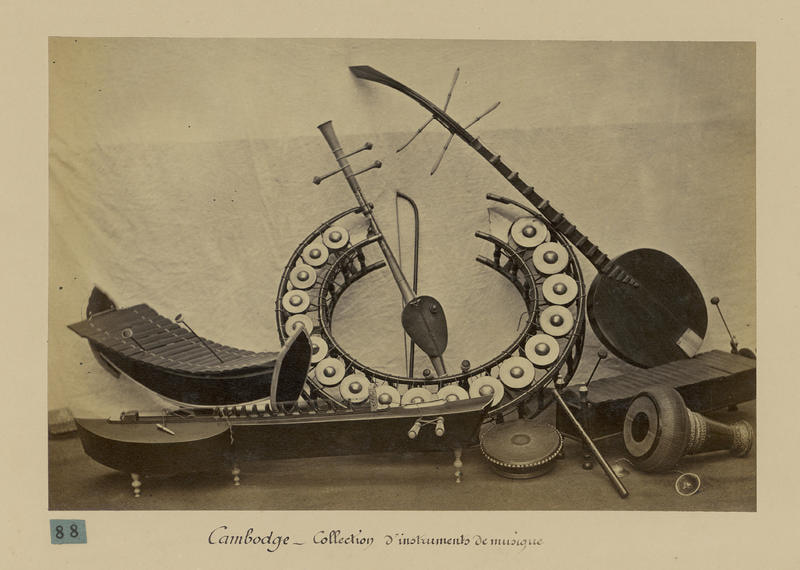
Cambodian mohaori musical instruments, mid 1800s. Taken by Emile Gsell.

Mohaori existed long ago in ancient Cambodia, since the time Khmer people settled in Cambodia. This type of music is not entirely derived from India. Mohaori was probably existed before or during Angkorian period and later adopted by the Thais of Ayutthaya Kingdom. In 1931, Prince Damrong, the author of the History of Thai Music, had asserted that the Thai mahori was of Khmer origin and created by the ancient Khmer and later adopted and elaborated in Thai society. This means that the Khmer Mohaori orchestra had already established during Angkor period, though believed having established much older.

After the fall of Angkor, Mohaori became popular in Thai Ayuthayan court and more developed in the Khmer court of Longvek. Later on Mohaori become the traditional ensemble for both states.

During Longvek era, the Mohaori was played by men musicians only but later during Udong, the players were mostly women and the female singer sang a beautiful song as melodious as the voice of Nori or Mohaori bird.

In observation, Mohaori ensemble was likely created from Phleng Kar ensemble (Marriage ensemble) and Pinpeat ensemble in combination. As most of the musical instruments used in this ensemble are taken from both Phleng Kar ensemble and Pinpeat ensemble.

Some believed that Mohaori music once was the property of the royal palace for the Kings, ministers, officials, and high-ranking people only. But later on, it became ordinary music for the public and citizens across Cambodia.

== Musical instruments used in mohaori ensemble ==
The characteristics of mohaori is that it is the musical ensemble which has a proper clear, fixed, and well-organized for both the lyrics, music rhythm, and wording of the sing which make the listeners feel comfortable, entertained, and fresh.

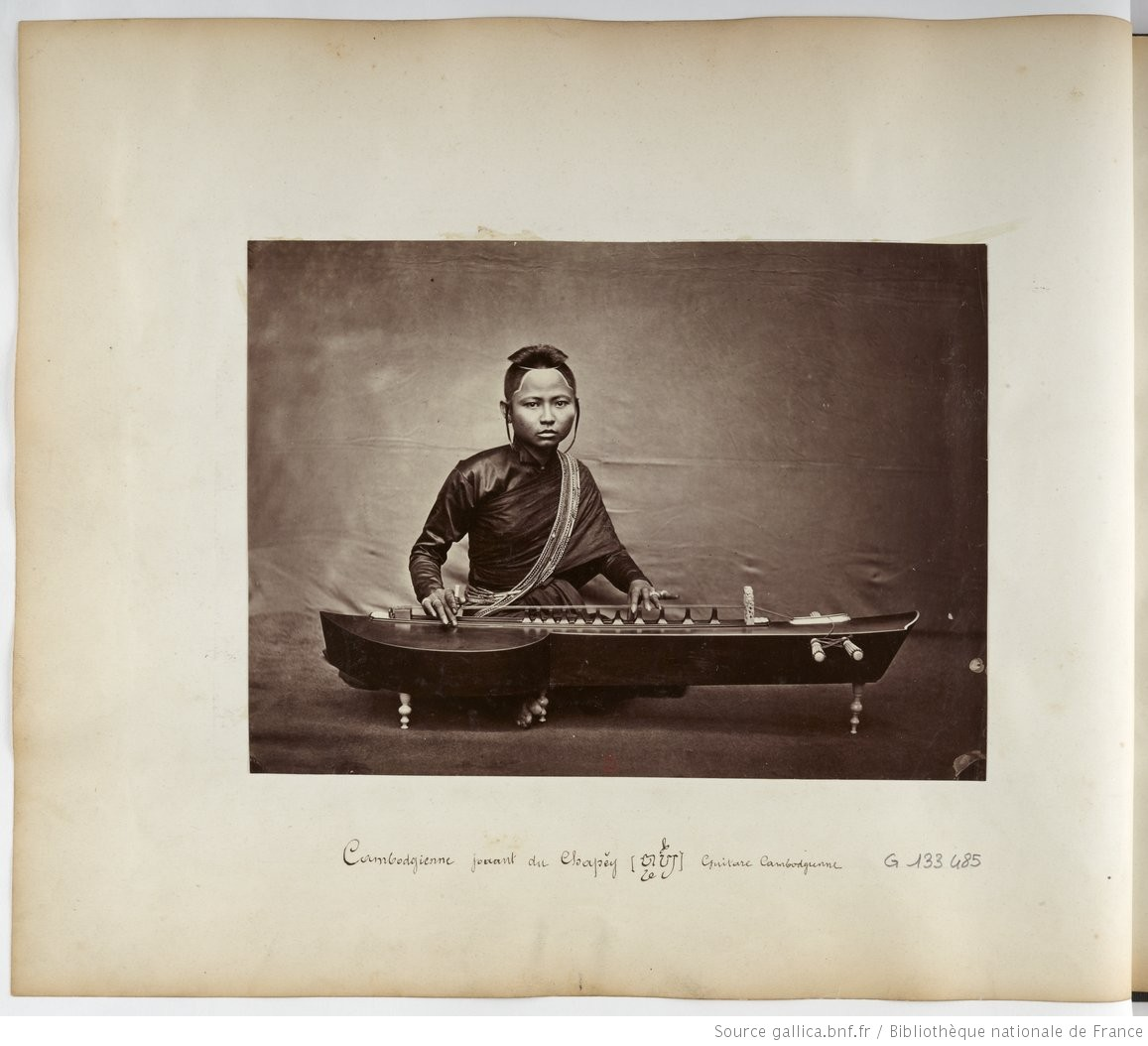
Krapeu, one of musical instrument accompanied in Mohaori, from book "Voyage de l'Égypte à l'Indochine" by photographers Hippolyte Arnoux and Emile Gsell. Late 1800s.

The ideal instruments of Mohaori includes:

- Roneat ek (high-pitched xylophone),
- Roneat thung (low-pitched xylophone),
- Khloy (duct or fipple flute),
- Tror che (high-pitched two stringed fiddle),
- Tror so toch (medium-high-pitched two stringed fiddle),
- Krapeu (three-stringed-zither),
- Khim (hammered dulcimer),
- Chhing (small cymbals), and
- two set piece of Thaun-rummanea (drums).

In practice the instrumentation varied from ensemble to the other depending on patronage and ownership.

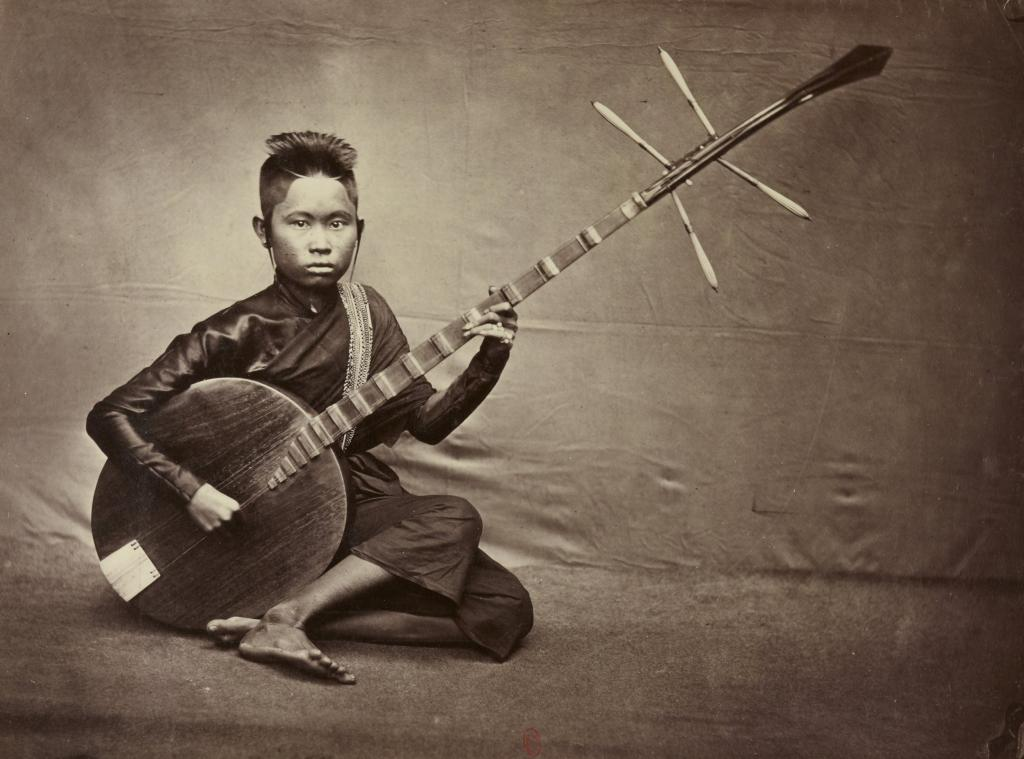
Chapei Dong Veng, one of the musical instrument accompanied in Mohaori. Late 1800s.

The Mohaori ensemble of Cambodian Royal Palace in Phnom Penh consisted of sixteen instruments including:

- Roneat ek,
- Roneat thung,
- Korng toch,
- Korng thum,
- Tror Khmer,
- Tror ou,
- Tror chhe,
- Khloy,
- Skor arakk,
- Chapei dong veng,
- Krapeu ek (now obsolete),
- Krapeu thung (now obsolete),
- Thaun, Krapp, Chhing,
- and Skor Rumanea.

== Type of Mohaori Ensemble ==
Mohaori is classified based on its type of ensembles. These include:

- Vung Phleng Mohaori Kreaung Pinpeat (literally, Pinpeat-instrument Mohaori Ensemble)
- Vung Phhleng Mohaori Kreaung Kh'sae (literally, Stringed-instrument Mohaori Ensemble)
- Vung Phleng Mohaori Preah Reach Trop (Royal Mohaori Ensemble) or Vung Phleng Pei Kaew
- Vung Phleng Mohaori Thum (literally, Large Mohaori Ensemble)
- Vung Phleng Mohaori Chhnai (literally, Modified Mohaori Ensemble)

== Popularity ==
In contrary to other Khmer musical ensemble such as Phleng Arakk, Phleng Kar, and Pinpeat, Mohaori functions are in secular context while the rest functions in religious context.

Mohaori is played at banquets, accompanied a Mohaori drama, and performs for folk dances such as the clappers'dance (Robam krapp), The Pestle dance (Robam Angre), the Rice Harvest Dance (Robam Chrot srov), and others.

Mohaori maybe played in the evening after dinner for entertainment or self-enjoyment purposes.

The usual performance pattern in Mohaori music calls for the vocalist and ensemble to alternate performing each section. The vocalist, accompanied only by drums (thuan-rumanea) and cymbals (chhing), sings one or two verses followed by the ensemble playing the same section of music.

== List of Mohaori Songs ==
Mohaori songs are very popular in Cambodia, besides accompanied in the Cambodian folk dances, they can be heard in various public places as well.

There are many Mohoari musics and songs (bot) such as:

- Bot O Sat Mohaori (The Mohaori bird)
- Bot Mohaori Bror Kum
- Bot Khmer Lerng Preah Ponlea
- Bot Khmer Chrot Srov (Khmer harvests rice)
- Bot Khmer Dombaanh (Khmer weaves [textile])
- Bot Khmer Krong Phka (Khmer braid the flower)
- Bot Khmer Plum Sloek (Khmer blows the leaf)
- Bot Khmer Bompe Kon (Khmer lulls the child)
- Bot Khmer Yol Tong (Khmer swings the swing)
- Bot Angdoek Si Trokoun (Turtle eats the water spinach)
- Bot Neary Chea Chuo (Lining ladies)
- Bot Neary Longvek (Longvek lady)
- Bot Kolap Roy
- Bot Krosang Teap
- Bot Chen Chhor Muk Touk
- Bot Chao Pream
- Bot Chinag Mai
- Bot Chhvea Der Tes
- Bot Chhvea Sombol Chrias
- Bot Domer Khmer
- Bot Domrei Leng Pluk
- Bot Trapeang Peay
- Bot Trayong Yum Thngor
- Bot Tevada Phtum
- Bot Tep Monorom
- Bot Teva Svor
- Bot Touch Yum (Weeping Gibbon)
- Bot Battambang
- Bot Petch Touch
- Bot Phumea Hao
- Bot Pumea Tiak Rolok
- Bot Káek Mon
- Bot Robam Chhma
- Bot Robam Phlet
- Bot Santoek Skor Kroam
- Bot Soy Pleng
- Bot Sarika
- Bot Seida Yum Thlaeng
- Bot Srolanh Phot Jet
- Bot Srei Leav Touch
- Bot Sat Heur
- Bot Saray Noem Noun
- Bot Soriya
- Bot Soy Son
- So on.

== Significance ==
Mohaori is traditionally a popular Cambodian music played in Khmer society since the late 9th century. Mohaori is still a popular Khmer traditional music played in various occasions and festivities. It is regarded as a popular music for the Cambodian locals to accompanied their custom and traditional celebrations.
