= Roneat dek =

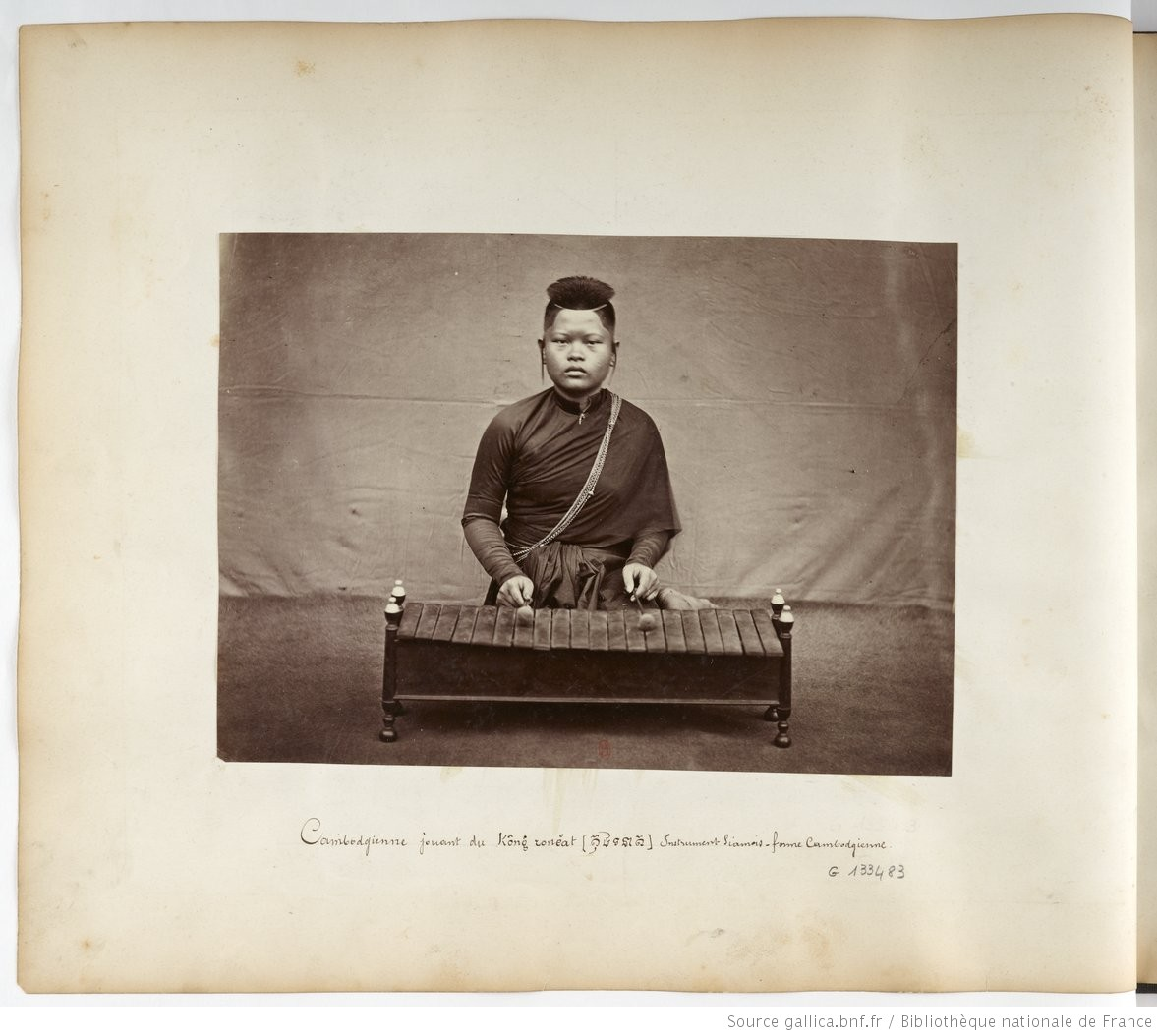
Female musician playing roneat dek (រនាតដែក) or roneat thong (រនាតថោង) metallophone at the Cambodian court, c. 1860s or 1870s. Image from French photographer Émile Gsel (1838–1879).

The roneat dek (Khmer: រនាតដែក) is a Cambodian metallophone, comparable to the Roneat ek. It is an ancient instrument made of 21 blackened-iron bars. It may be used in the Pinpeat ensemble and Mahaori orchestra. It is believed to have originated from the Royal Courts before the Angkor period. This instrument is rarely covered with ornamentation on either the bars or the sound box. The roneat dek is analogous to the ranat ek lek of Thailand.

== Etymology ==
In the Khmer language, "roneat" means xylophone, and "dek" means metal or iron. The name likely originates from the roneat dek's note bars, which are made of iron or other metals. The term "dek" is derived from the Dai languages and corresponds to the word "lek," meaning "iron." In related languages, this is reflected in Thai (เหล็ก), Chinese (鐵), Lao (ເຫຼັກ), and Tai Lü (𑜎𑜢𑜀𑜫).

== History ==
The origin of roneat dek is similar to other Khmer roneat genres and thought to predate the Angkorian period, perhaps from the earlier Angkorian period.

According to Ouknha Moha Thipadei Meas Ni, the chief of Cambodian Royal Orchestra, this type of Roneat was modeled from Javanese gamelan musical instrument called Gendér since the reign of Khmer king Jayavarman II. At the end of 9th century he was in exile in Java. He then returned to Cambodia and became the first king of the Khmer Empire, bringing with him some Javanese influence. This type of Roneat genre is thought to have originated after this historical event; however, this Roneat genre had been modified distinctively from its original gendér form.

== Structure ==
The roneat dek or roneat thong has 21 iron or bronze bars. Because of their weight, the bars cannot be suspended on cords but are laid in stepwise order on pads over a rectangular trough resonator. In its shape and size, the bars resemble those of the roneat ek, but they are tuned by scraping or firing away part of the metal.

The player use a pair of mallets or roneat sticks similar to those of other Roneats but made of hard material such as hide of a buffalo or elephant.

== Variation ==
=== Roneat Thong ===
A variation on the instrument was the roneat thong (Khmer: រនាតថោង) which was made of a reddish-brown brass or bronze, similar to gold.

The Roneat dek and roneat thong may have been equivalent, with the gold-barred version played "in the Royal Palace," while the iron-barred version was used in the "Orchestra, picnic outside the palace, or in pagodas."

However, equivalent Thai metallaphone instruments can help illustrate possibilities; the Ranat ek lek had a golden and a blackened iron version. That version was also historically called "ranad thawng." Thai music also has a lower pitched instrument, the Ranat thum lek. If these instruments follow the pattern of the Thai instruments, then the roneat thung may be like the ranat ek lek with brass and blackened-iron versions, or it may be the Cambodian equivalent of the lower pitched ranat thum lek.

Pictures with these instrument names (and with equivalent numbers of tone bars) similar to the higher and lower pitched Thai instruments were illustrated in the Cambodian book "Cambodian National Music."

However, these Thai musical instruments originated more recently, in the reign of King Rama IV (1854–1868) in the 19th century. The similarity in their name may be attributed to the Thai annexation of Northwestern Cambodia from the late 18th century, which ended in 1907, as the age of this Khmer musical instrument was thought to be much older than this.

== Significance ==
Normally, Roneat Thong is used in Khmer royal orchestra whereas Roneat Dek is usually used in the Pinpeat orchestra outside the Royal Palace or in pagodas.

== See also ==
- Roneat ek
- Roneat thung
- Traditional Cambodian musical instruments
- Music of Cambodia
