= Émile Gsell =

French photographer

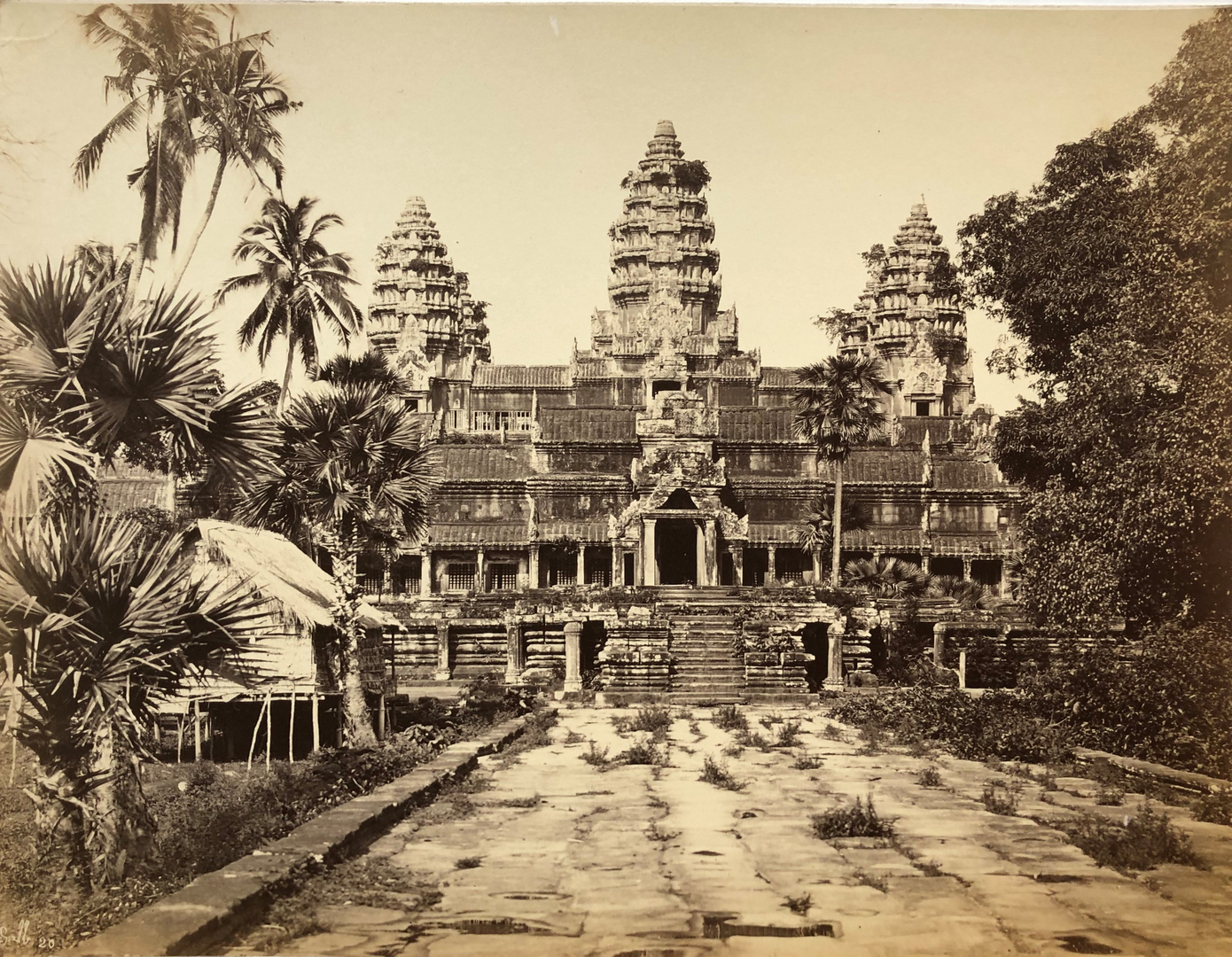
View of central galleries and towers of Angkor Wat, photo from Ruines d'Ang-Cor, Cambodge, 1866. Albumen print by Émile Gsell

Émile Gsell (1838 - 1879) was a French photographer who worked in Southeast Asia, becoming the first commercial photographer based in Saigon (now Ho Chi Minh City). He participated in at least three scientific expeditions, and the images he produced from the first, to Angkor Wat, are among the earliest photographs of that site. Though he died at an early age, he managed to make several hundred photographs in just over a dozen years featuring a wide range of subject matter including architecture, landscapes, and studio, ethnographic and genre portraits.

== Biography ==
Gsell was born in Sainte-Marie-aux-Mines, Haut-Rhin, France, on 30 December 1838.

In Cochinchina, Gsell was hired by the Commission d'exploration du Mékong, directed by Ernest Doudart de Lagrée (b. 1823 - d. 1868), to photograph the ruins of Angkor. Gsell accompanied the expedition to French Indochina and Siam (now Thailand, and at the time in possession of Angkor) from June to September or October 1866, often receiving suggestions for photographic points of view from Doudart de Lagrée.

Also in 1866, following the expedition, Gsell established himself as a commercial photographer in Saigon, becoming the first professional photographer in that city.

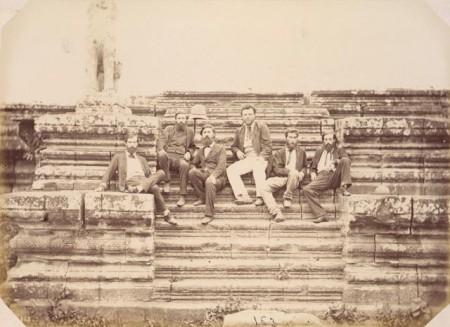
Group portrait of Doudart de Lagrée and other members of the Commission d'exploration du Mékong, Angkor Wat, Siem Reap, Cambodia, 1866. Albumen print by Emile Gsell.

In the first half of 1873 Gsell returned to Angkor and travelled through Cambodia with Louis Delaporte. On the quality of his Cambodian photographs, Gsell was awarded a medal of merit at the Vienna International Exhibition, held from 1 May to 31 October 1873, and where Gsell exhibited two albums of photographs, one of the ruins of Angkor and the other of "the mores, customs, and types of the Annamite and Cambodian populations".

In April 1875, Gsell accompanied a mission, led by Brossard de Corbigny, to Huế in modern Vietnam, though he was not allowed to photograph the people he met nor the Citadel. However, two of his photographs demonstrate that he was in Hanoi at the end of 1875. From November 1876 to January 1877 Gsell was able to take many views of Tonkin (now northern Vietnam).

Gsell's photographs were marketed by Auguste Nicolier, who sold chemicals and photographic supplies in Saigon from 1876.

Gsell died at home in Saigon on 16 October 1879. After his death, O. Wegener succeeded Gsell, obtaining and using his stock in the early 1880s, then passing it on to Vidal (also known as Salin-Vidal) who marketed it under the names Vidal and Salin-Vidal until his own death in 1883.

== Gallery ==
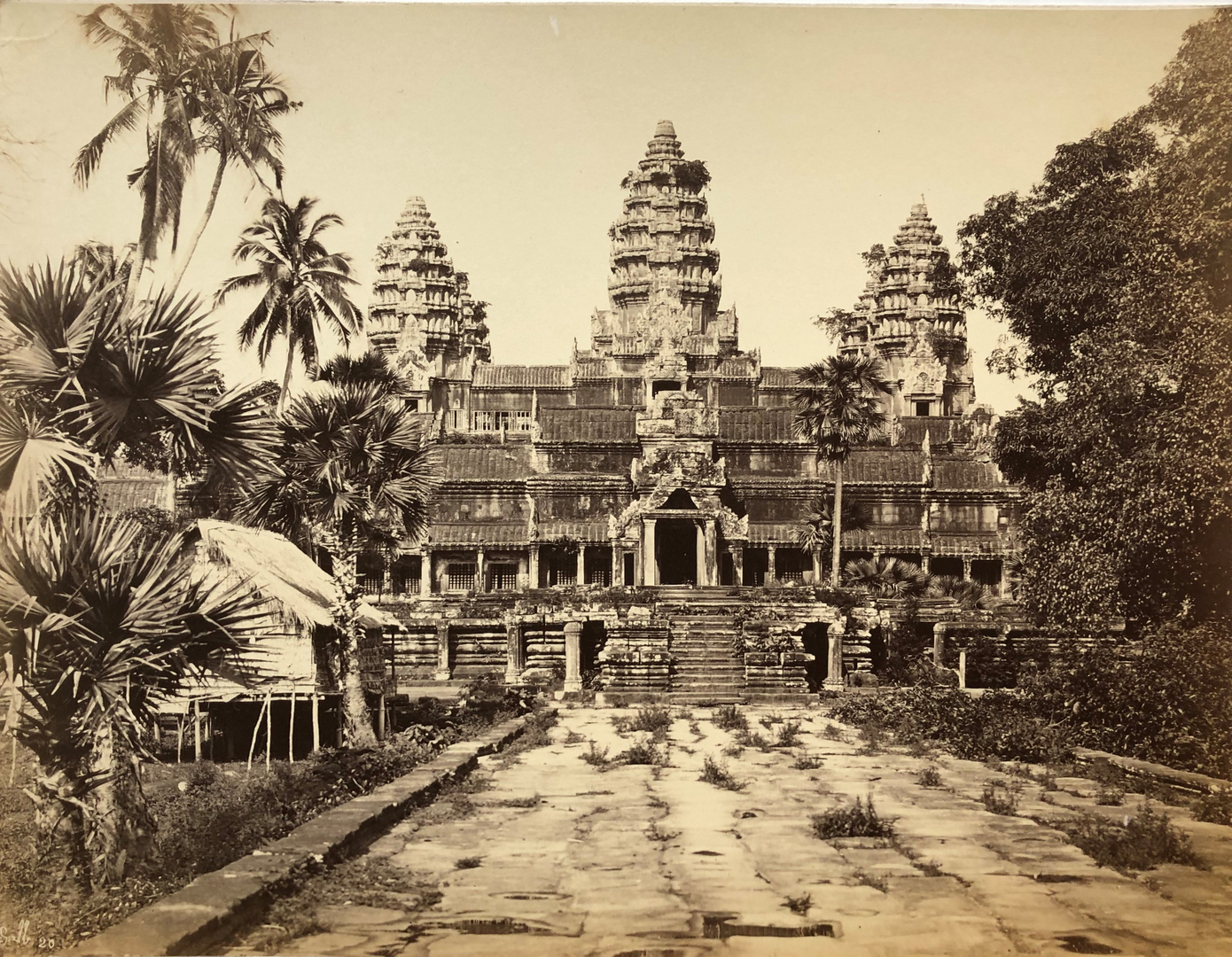
Angkor, 1866

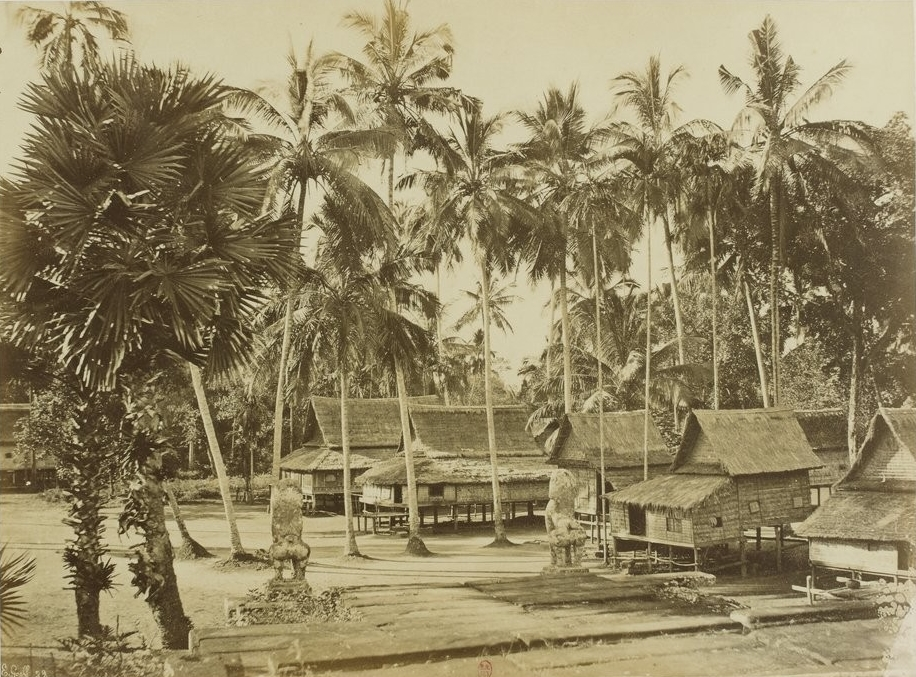
Buddhist temple at Angkor, 1866

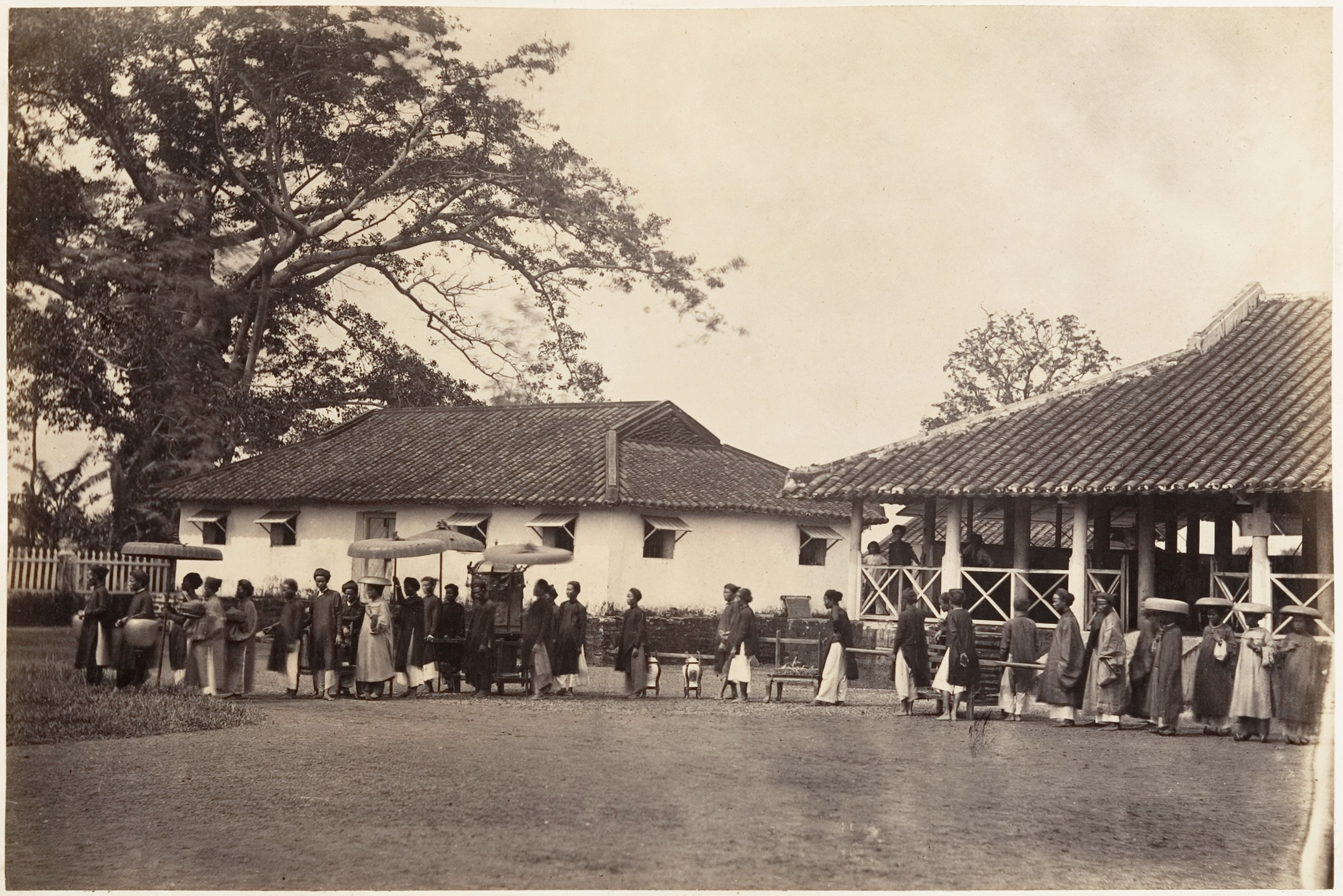
Wedding in Saigon, 1866

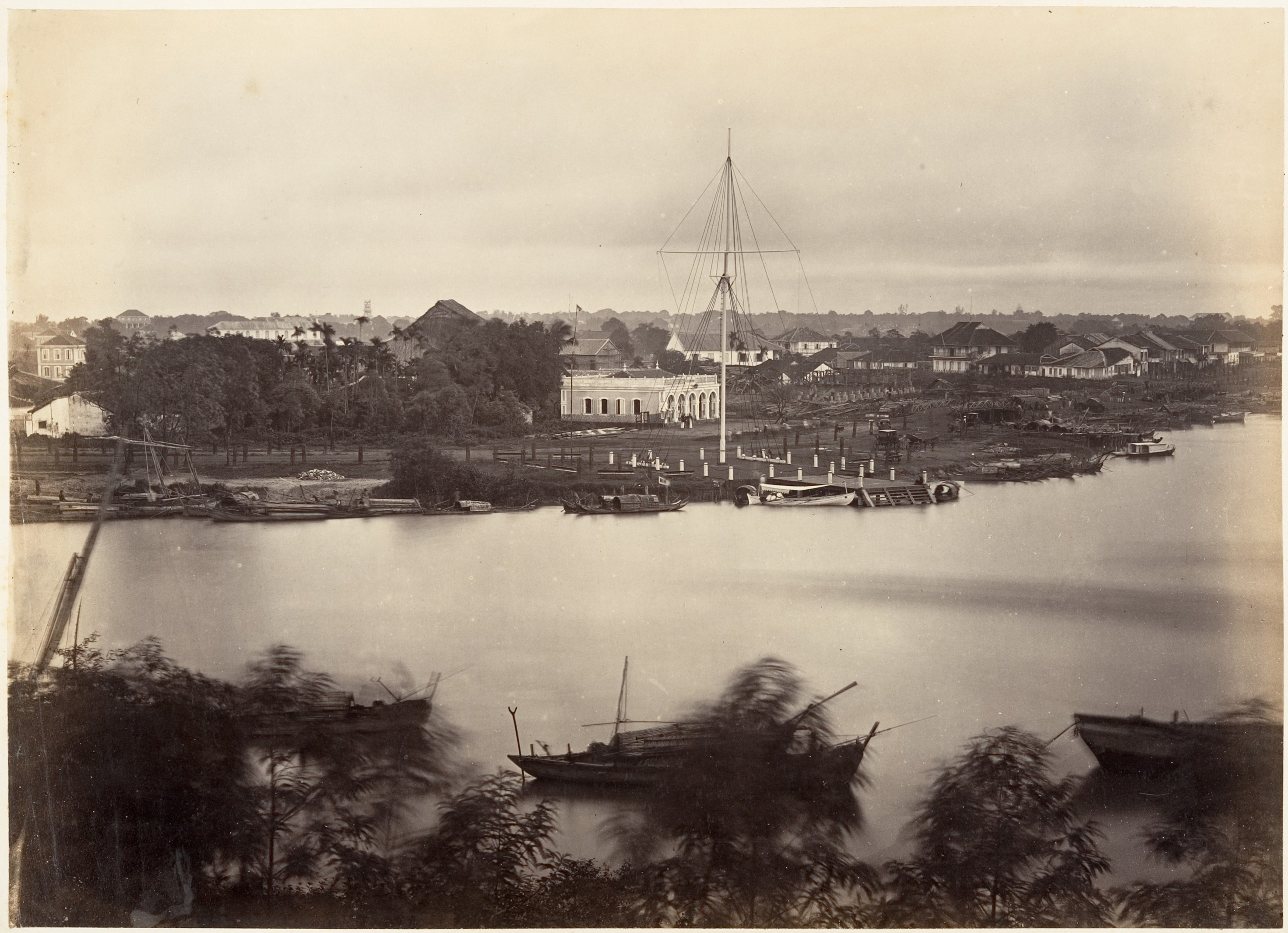
Saigon, 1866

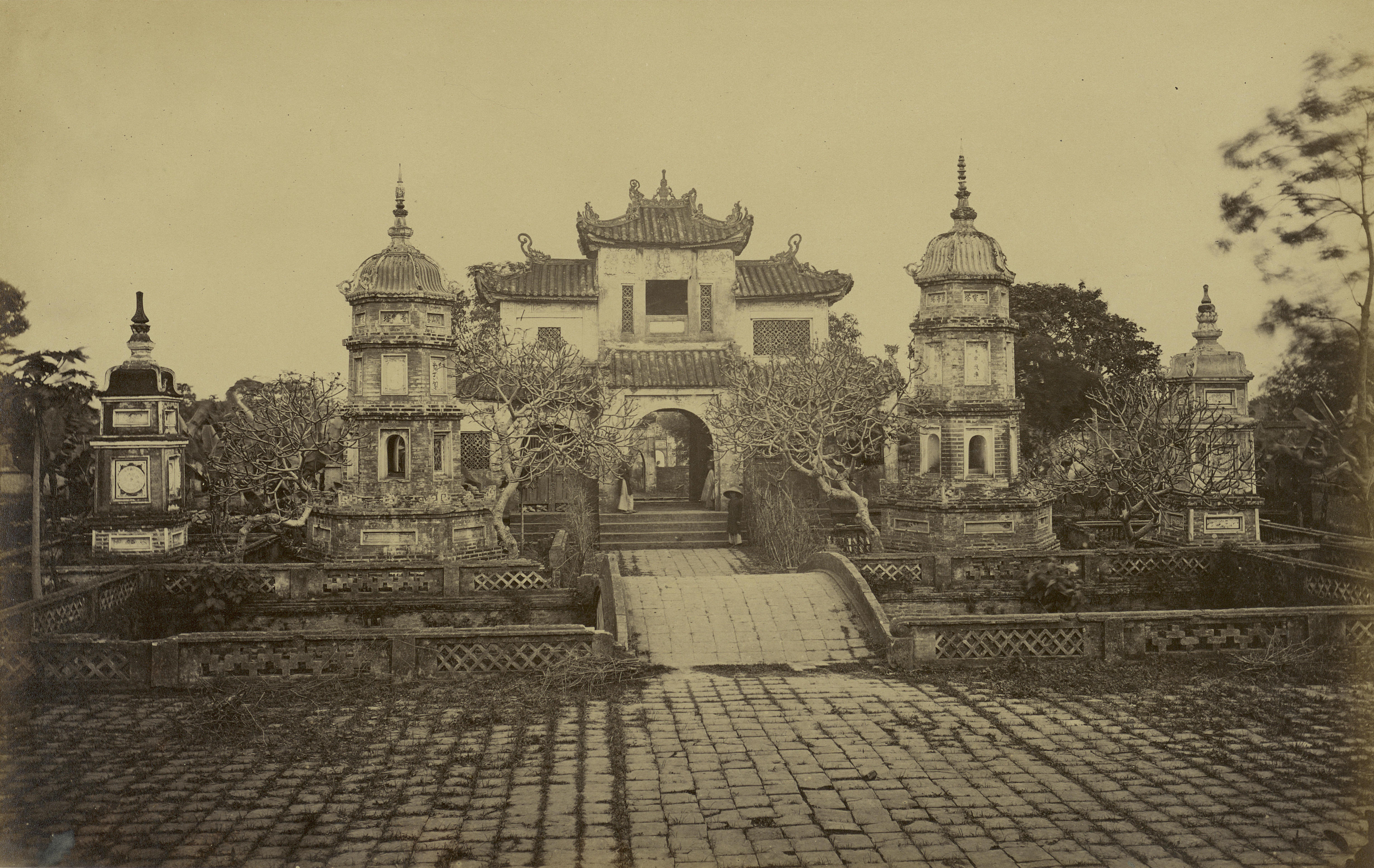
Báo Ân Temple, Hanoi, 1879

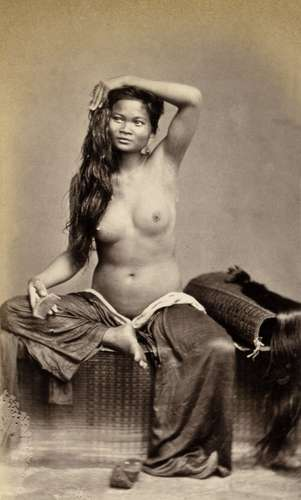

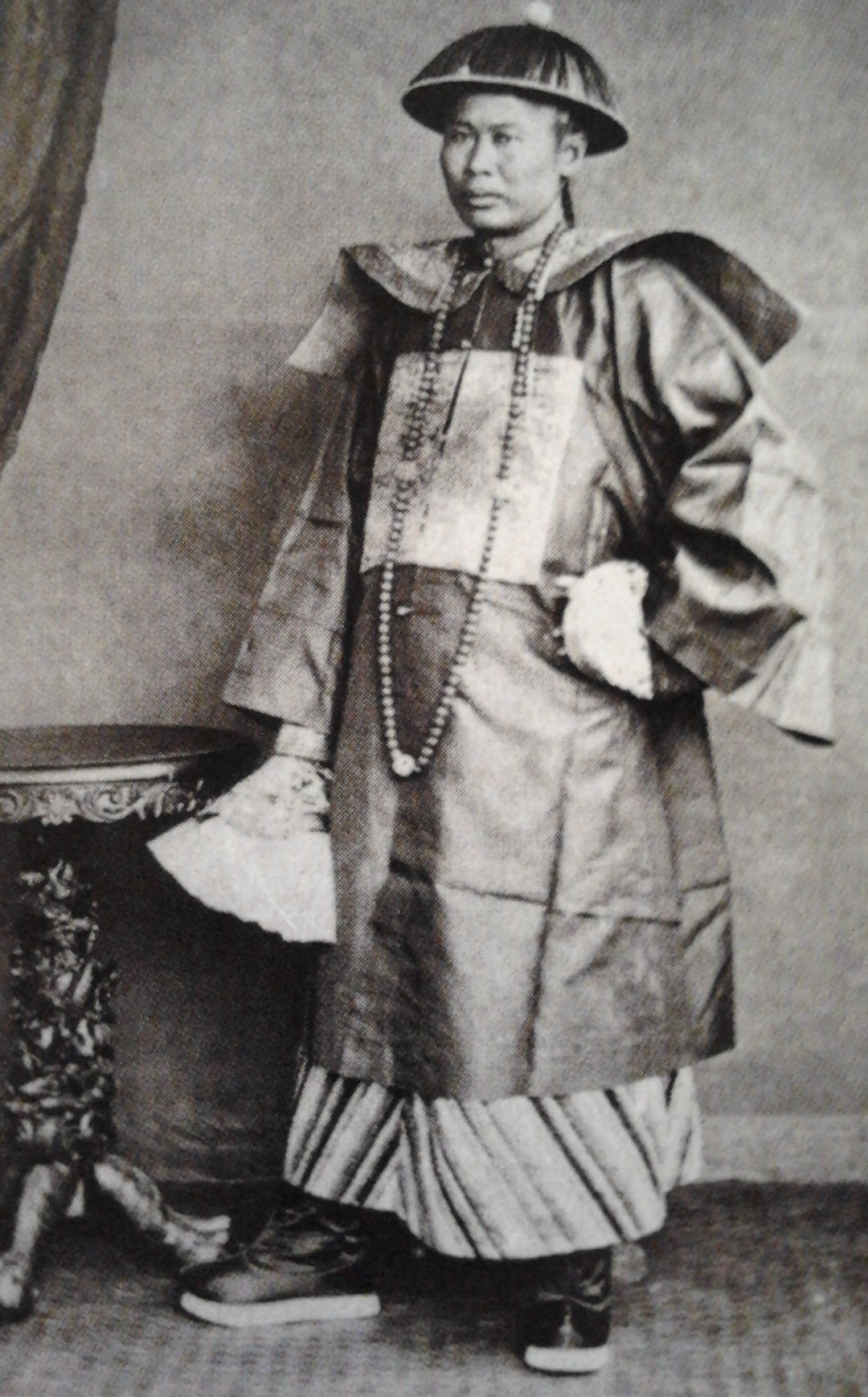
Chinese resident

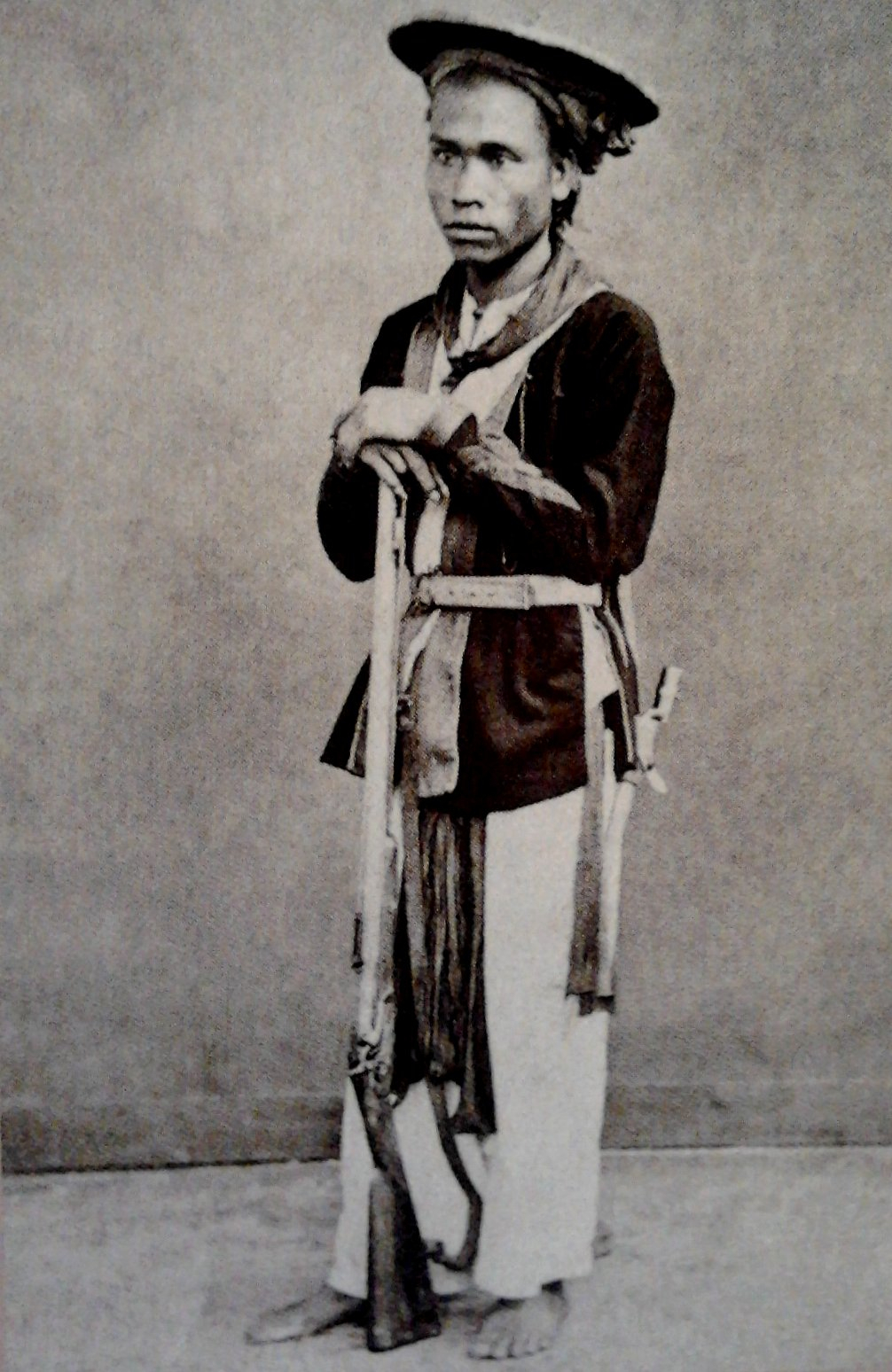

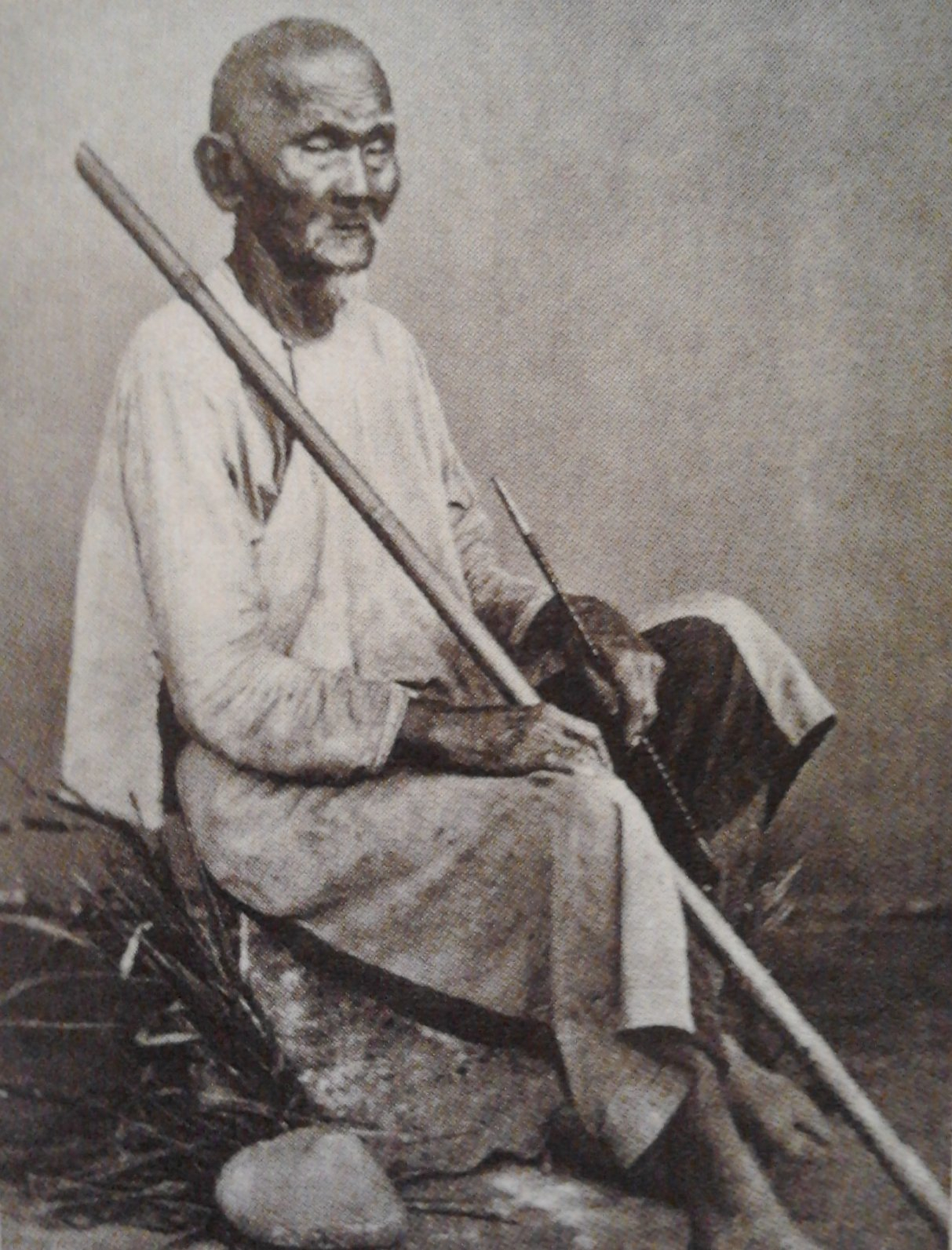

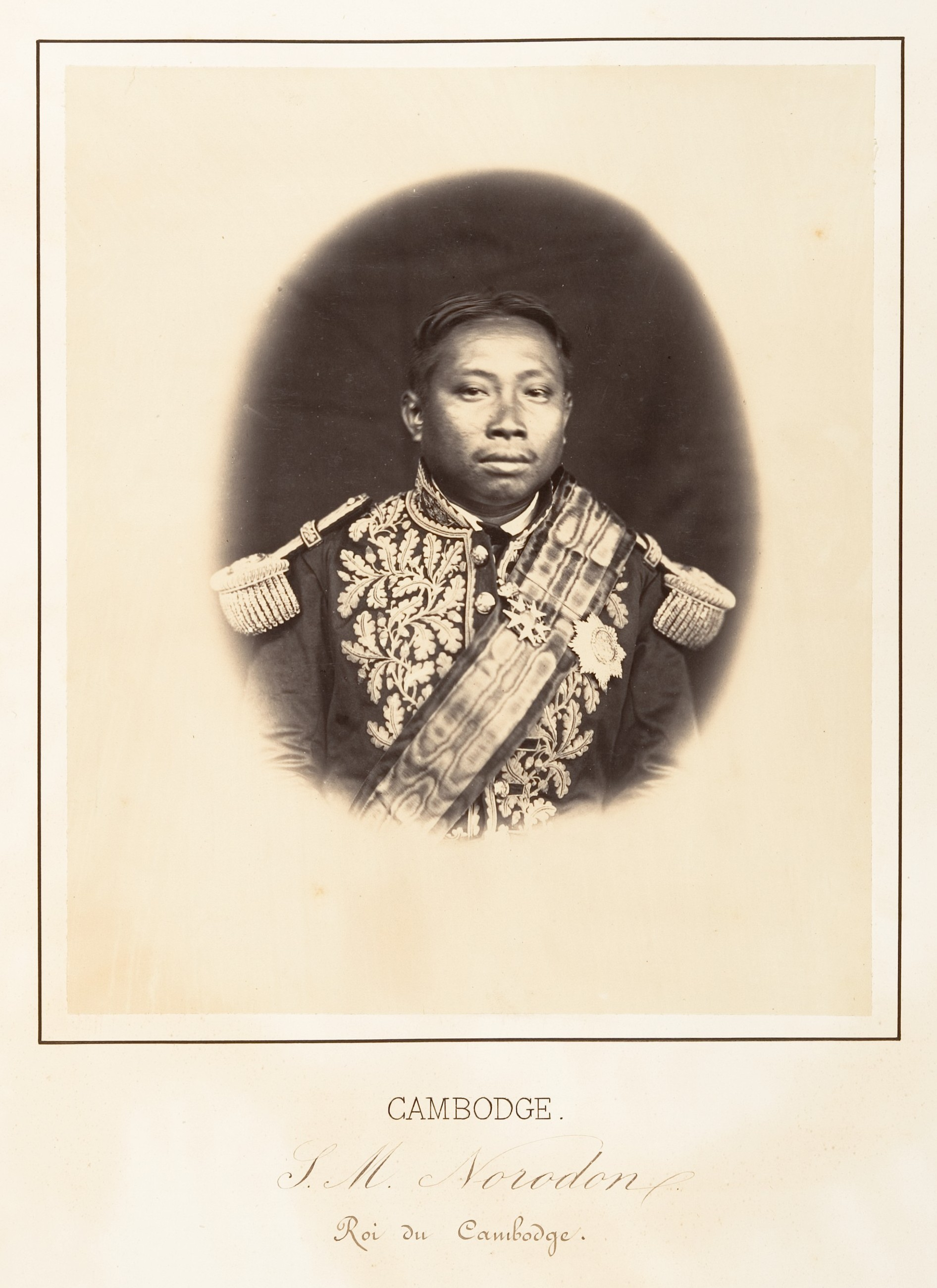
King of Cambodia Norodom I

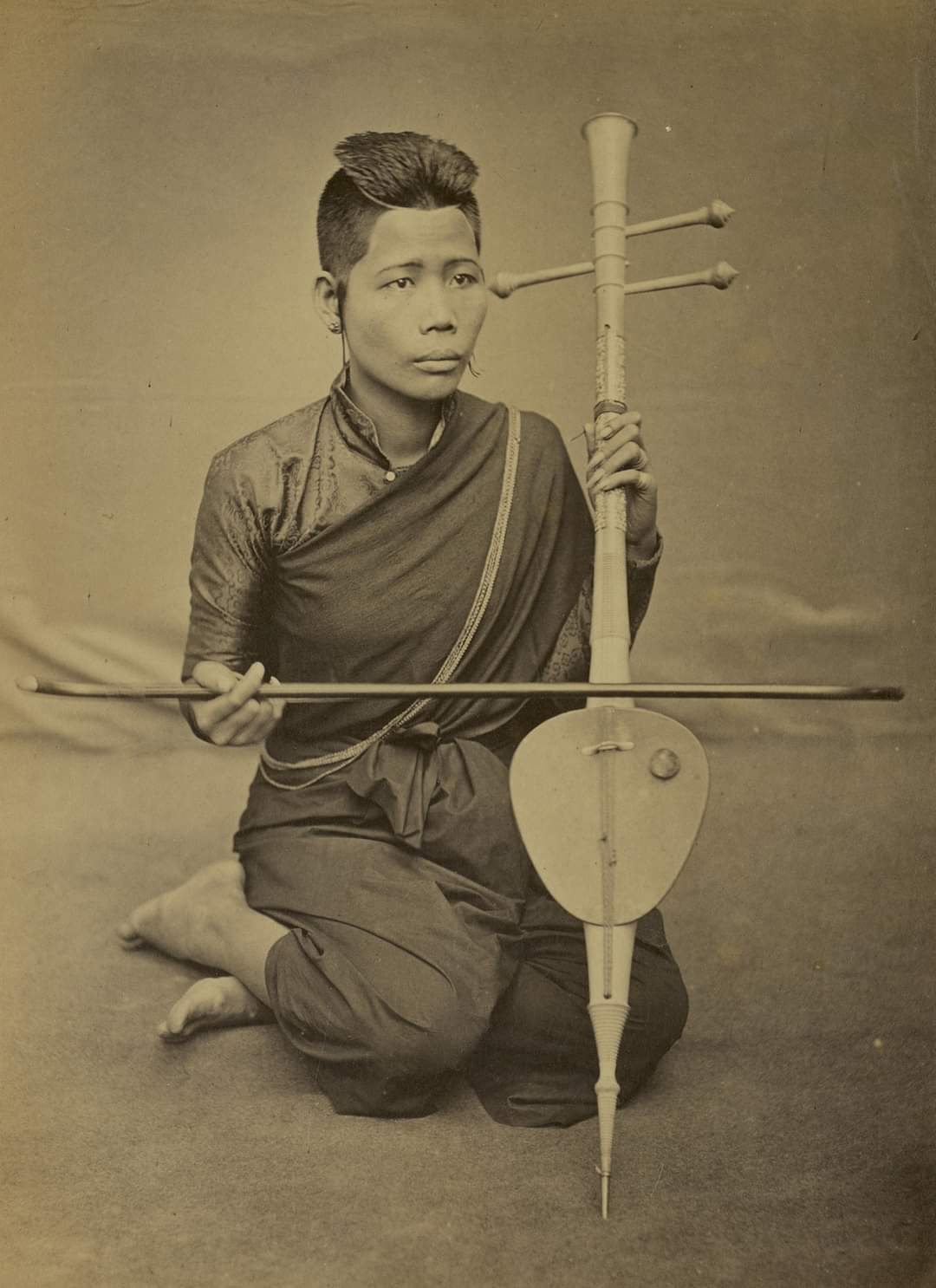
Khmer musician

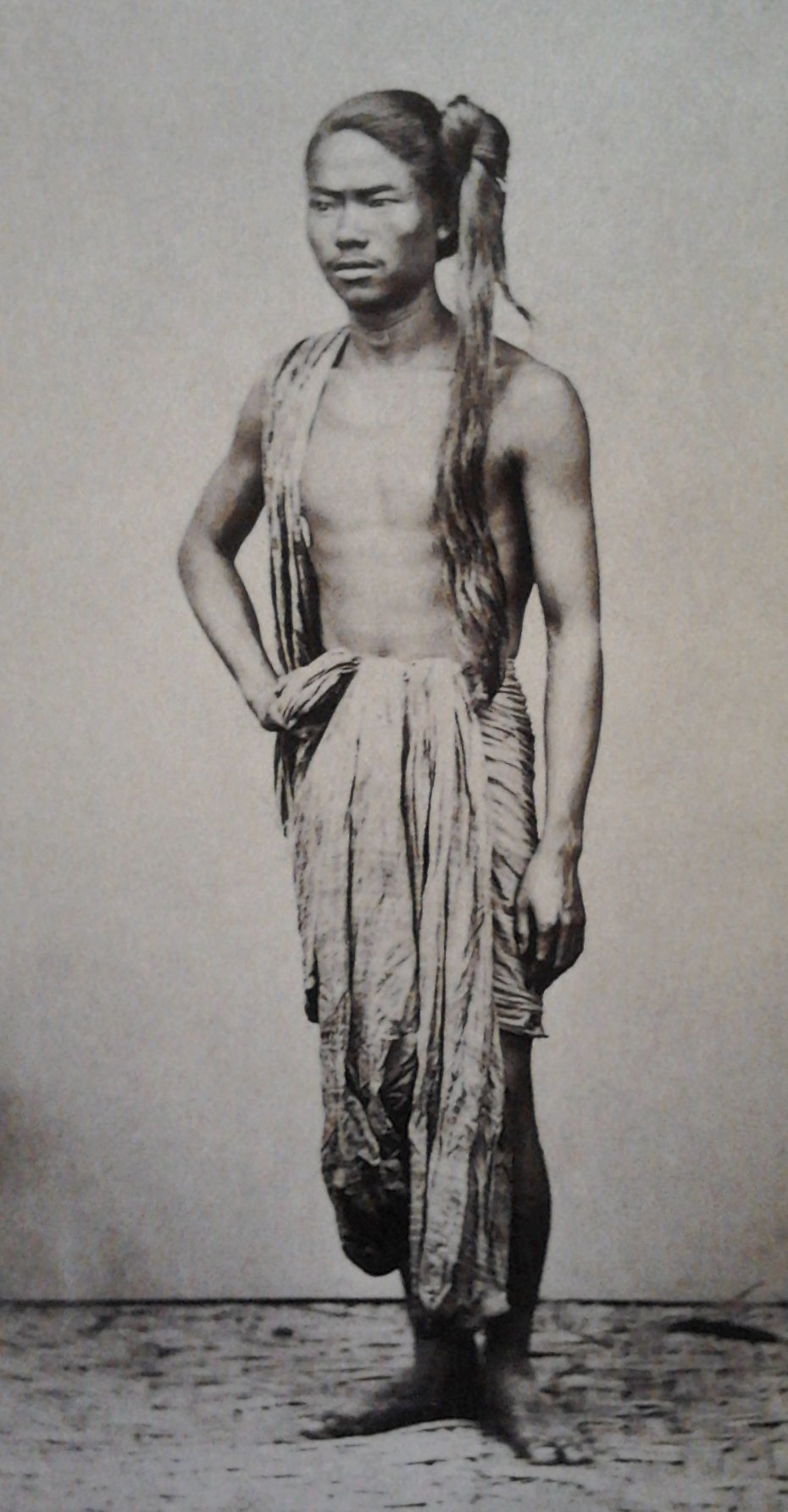
Malay cabman

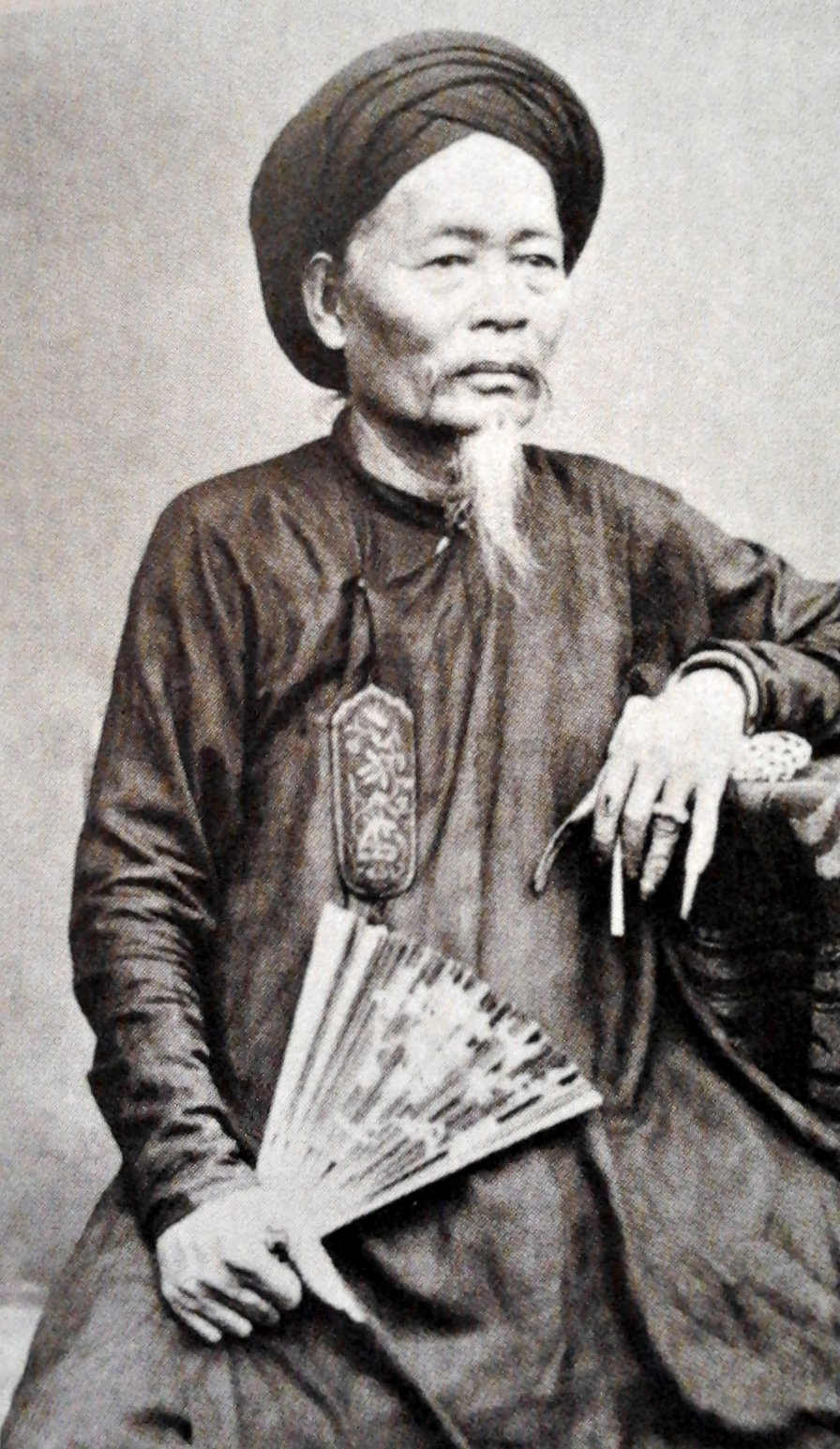
Mandarin

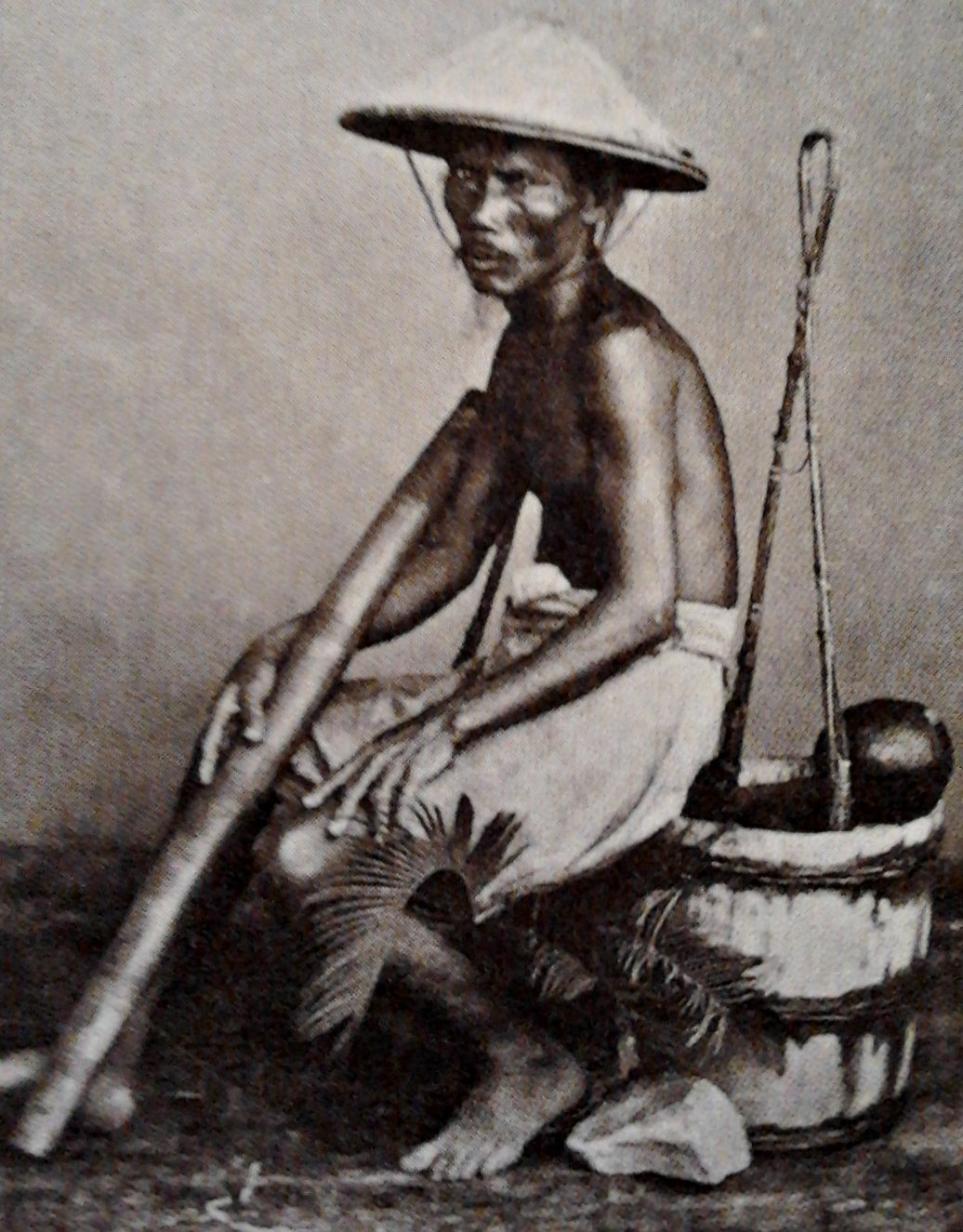
Merchant with opium pipe

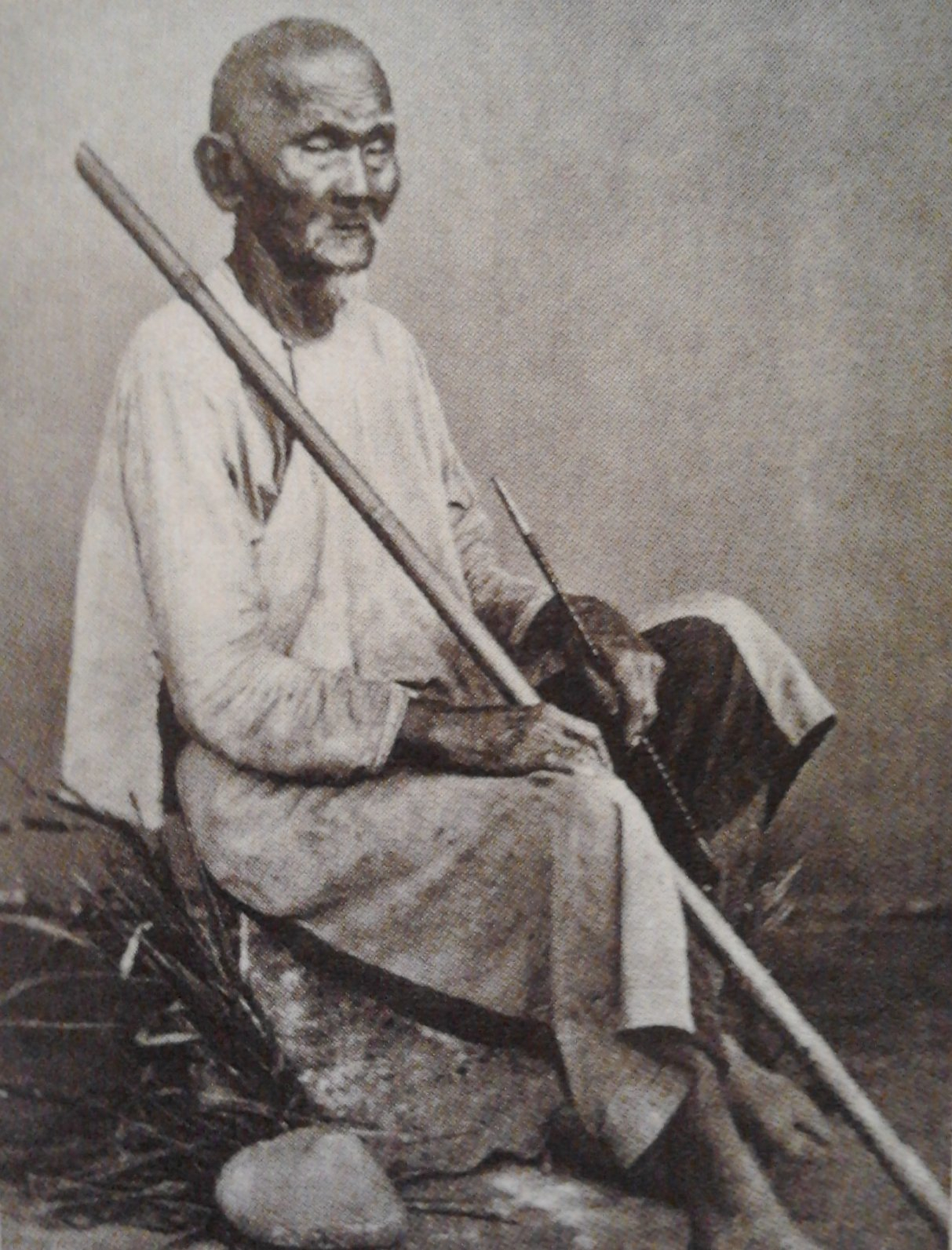
Pilgrim

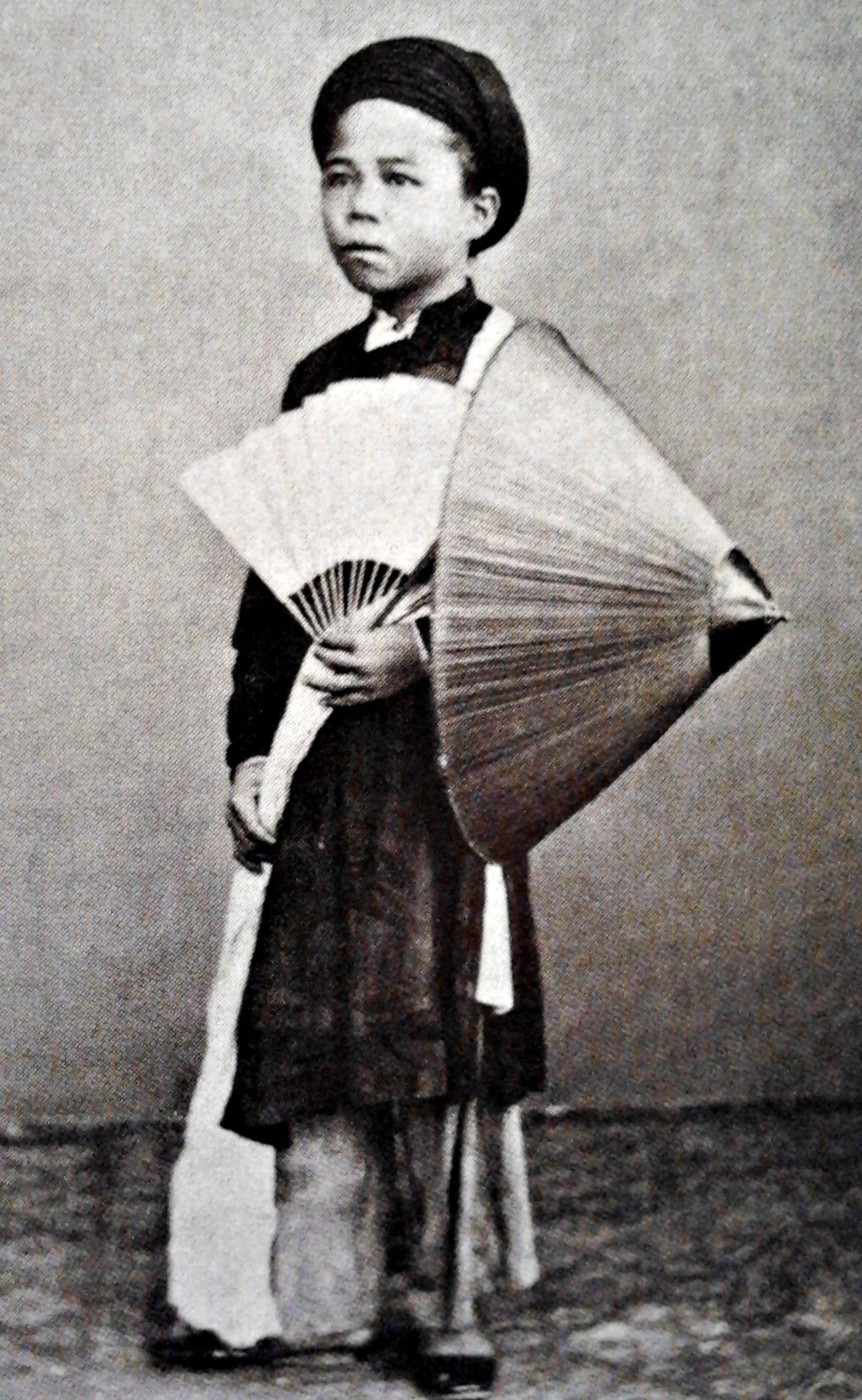
Young Vietnamese

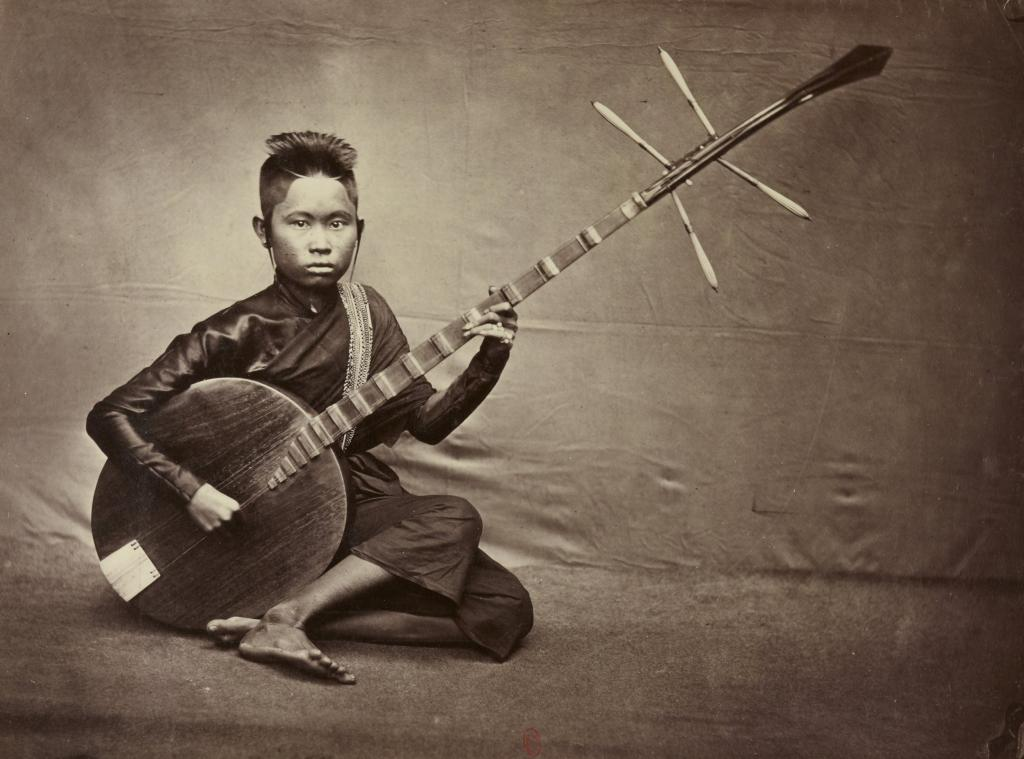
Cambodian musician playing a chapey

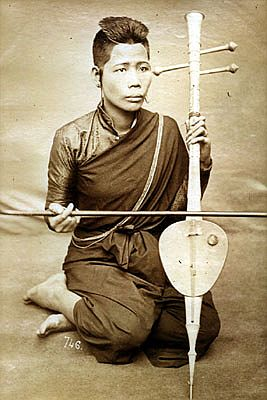
Cambodian musician playing a tro Khmer

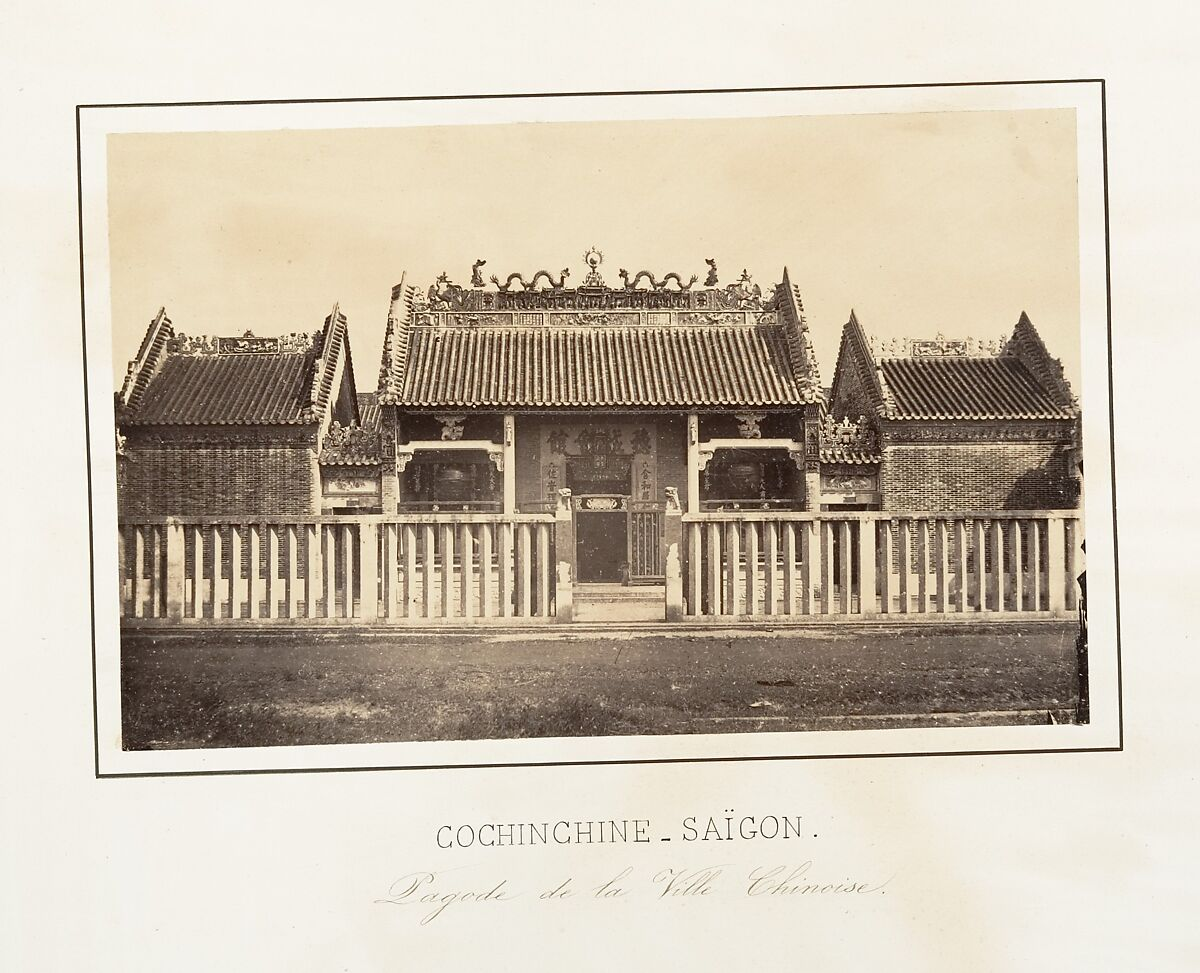
Pagode de la Ville Chinoise, 1866. The Met.

== See also ==
- Mekong Expedition of 1866-1868

== Literature ==
- Anglo-American Name Authority File, s.v. "Gsell, Emile", LC Control Number nr2002017108. Accessed 26 May 2004.
- Auer, Michèle, and Michel Auer. 'Encyclopédie internationale des photographes / Photographers encyclopaedia international: index' (Paris: Maison européenne de la photographie; Hermance, Switzerland: Camera Obscura, 1992).
- Bautze, Joachim K[arl]. 'Émile Gsell (1838–79) and Early Photographs of Angkor'. Connecting Empires and States: Selected Papers from the 13th International Conference of the European Association of Southeast Asian Archaeologists, Vol. 2; ed. by Mai Lin Tjoa-Bonatz, Andreas Reinicke & Dominik Bonatz, Singapore: NUS Press 2012, 306-316.
- Edwards, Gary. 'International Guide to Nineteenth-Century Photographers and Their Works' (Boston: G.K. Hall, 1988), 231.
- Franchini, Philippe, and Jérôme Ghesquière, sous la direction de [under the direction of]. Des photographes en Indochine: Tonkin, Annam, Cochinchine, Cambodge et Laos au XIXe siècle (Paris: Marval, 2001), 224-225
- Ghesquière, Jérôme: Photographes en Indochine. Tonkin, Annan, Cochinchine, Cambodge et Laos au XIXe siècle, Marval, Paris 2001
- Mizerski, Jim: Cambodia Captured: Angkor's First Photographers in 1860's Colonial Intrigues, Jasmine Image Machine, 2016, p. 3
- Ministère des Affaires étrangères, France. 'France diplomatie; Archives et patrimoine; Pages d'Histoire; Journées du Patrimoine 2003: Patrimoine spirituel autour du Monde; Une contribution à la préservation du patrimoine mondial. Les temples d'Angkor.; La mission Doudart de Lagrée à Angkor, 1866.'. Accessed 16 January 2004.
