= Bambangan Cakil =

Indonesian classical dance

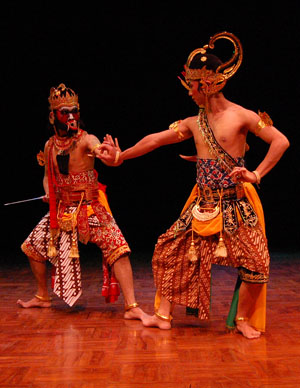
- Bambangan Cakil performance
- Native name: ꧋ꦧꦩ꧀ꦧꦔꦤ꧀ꦕꦏꦶꦭ꧀ (Javanese); Tari Klasik Bambangan Cakil (Indonesian)
- Instrument(s): Gamelan
- Inventor: Javanese
- Origin: Central Java (Indonesia)

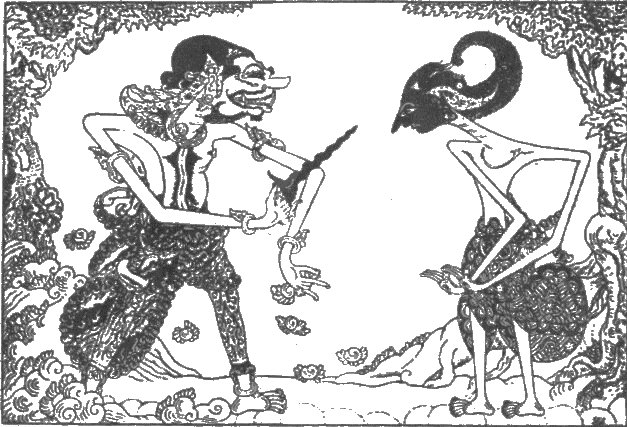
Cakil (left) and Arjuna (right) as wayang.

Bambangan Cakil (Javanese: ꧋ꦧꦩ꧀ꦧꦔꦤ꧀ꦕꦏꦶꦭ꧀) is a classical dance-drama of the Javanese people in—particularly—Central Java, Indonesia. This dance-drama demonstrates wayang performance due to the movement is adopted from one of the scenes in wayang kulit performance, that is the Perang Kembang scene. The Perang Kembang told about war between kesatria and raksasa. The kesatria has soft and gentle characters, while the raksasa is described as a character who is rough and violent.

The dance-drama war between kesatria (Bambangan) against raksasa (Cakil) could also be used as a place for a dalang's judgment in moving a puppet.

== Philosophy ==
In Javanese culture, kesatria are always considered to be good figures, willing to defend the truth, to help others, etc. The kesatria title is given, rather than being heredity. For example, in the Mahabharata story, Kurawa does not have a kesatria title, even though he has the same ancestors as the Pandava.

On the other hand, raksasa are characterised as rough, violent and dynamic.

== Characterizations ==
In the Bambangan Cakil dance-drama, Arjuna is depicted as kesatria, while Cakil is depicted as raksasa.

== See also ==
- Gandrung
- Ramayana Ballet
- Wayang
- Wayang wong
- Javanese dance
- Dance in Indonesia
