= Wayang wong =

Indonesian traditional theatre

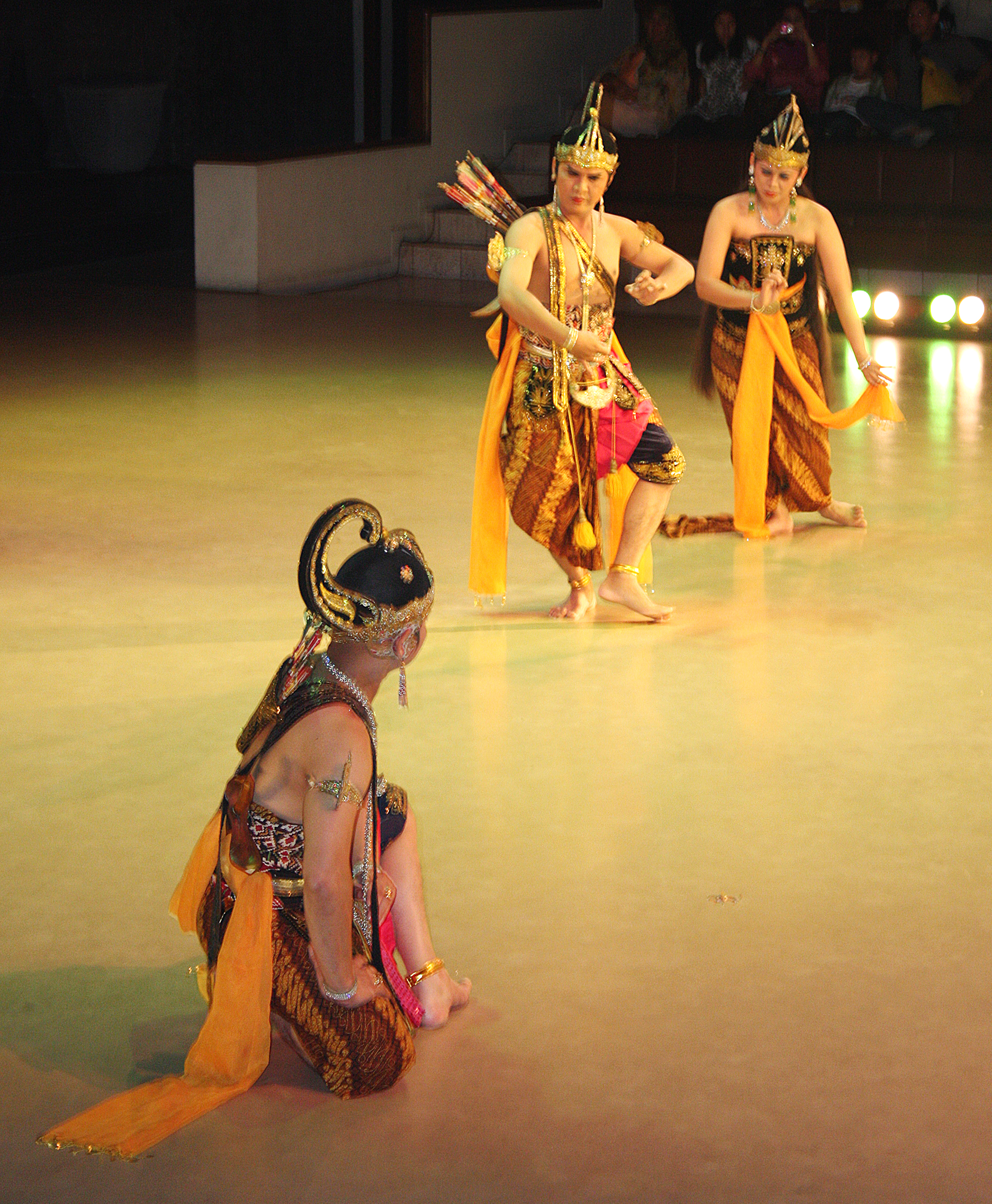
- Ramayana wayang wong performance at the Prambanan temple, Yogyakarta, Indonesia.
- Types: Traditional
- Originating culture: Indonesia (Javanese and Balinese)

Wayang
- UNESCO Intangible Cultural Heritage
- Country: Indonesia
- Reference: 00063
- Region: Asia and the Pacific

Inscription history
- Inscription: 2008 (3rd session)
- List: Representative

Wayang wong (Javanese: ꦮꦪꦁꦮꦺꦴꦁ (in the ngoko register)), also known as wayang orang (lit. 'human-form wayang'), is a type of classical Javanese and Balinese dance theatrical performance with themes taken from episodes of the Ramayāna or Mahabharāta. Performances are stylised, reflecting Javanese court culture:

Wayang wong dance drama in the central Javanese Kraton (royal court) of Yogyakarta represents the epitome of Javanese aesthetic unity. It is total theatre involving dance, drama, music, visual arts, language, and literature. A highly cultured sense of formality permeates every aspect of its presentation.

Despite being closely associated with Javanese and Balinese tradition, variants of wayang wong dance drama can also be found in neighboring Javanese ethnic traditions, including Sundanese tradition.

== History ==
The bas relief panels on the ninth-century Prambanan temple show episodes of the Ramayana epic. The adaptation of Mahabharata episodes has been integrated in the Javanese literature tradition since the Kahuripan and Kediri era, with notable examples such as Arjunawiwaha, composed by Mpu Kanwa in the 11th century. The Penataran temple in East Java depicts themes from the Ramayana and Mahabharata in its bas reliefs. The Javanese dance drama associated with wayang's epic themes from the Ramayana and Mahabharata would have existed by then.

Wayang in Kawi (Old Javanese) means "shadow" and wong means "human". Wayang wong was a performance in the style of wayang kulit (the shadow theatre of Central Java), wherein actors and actresses took the puppets' roles. The first written reference to the form is on the stone inscription Wimalarama from East Java dated 930 CE. The genre is currently done in masked and unmasked variations in Central Java, Bali, and Cirebon, as well as in Sunda (West Java).

Wayang wong is closely associated with Javanese culture. Originally, it was performed only as an aristocratic entertainment in the four palaces of Yogyakarta, Pakualaman, Surakarta, and Mangkunegaran. In the course of time, it evolved into a popular and folk form as well. Javanese wayang wong performances are regularly staged on the Trimurti Ramayana open-air stage in Prambanan temple, compound as Ramayana Ballet, Purawisata cultural hall in Yogyakarta, Sriwedari park in Solo, and also Ngesti Pandawa in Semarang.

== Variations ==
Other than in the Javanese dance tradition, the variants of wayang wong dance drama can also be found in other traditions, including in Balinese and Sundanese traditions.

=== Wayang wong Bali ===
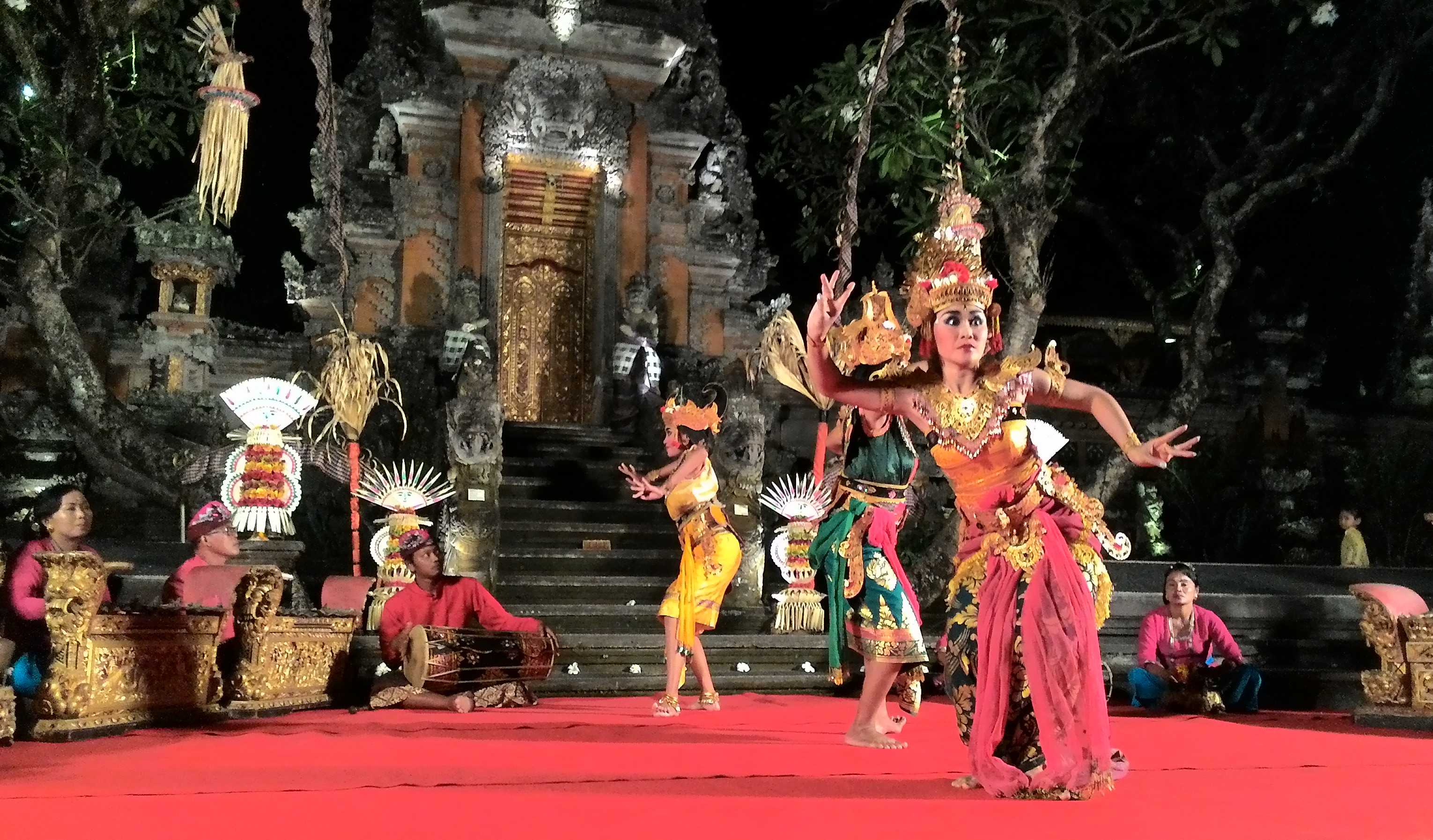
Balinese wayang wong Ramayana, performed in Sarasvati Garden in Ubud

Wayang wong Bali refers to a Balinese version of wayang dance drama. Its contemporary presentation is usually included within the kecak dance, where fragments or episodes of the Ramayana are performed amidst the chanting kecak dancers. However, a Balinese wayang wong version that does not include kecak dancers has also existed, especially in Ubud. Wayang wong Bali is usually associated with Buleleng District.

=== Wayang wong Cirebon ===
Wayang wong Cirebon refers to a tradition of wayang dance drama in the city of Cirebon, West Java. Cirebon has two styles of wayang wong. The first is a commoner's or village version in which the performers are masked. The second is a Cirebon palace variant where the performers are unmasked. Cirebonese wayang wong developed at the beginning of the nineteenth century, and influenced the wayang wong Priangan by the end of that century.

=== Wayang wong Priangan ===
Wayang wong Priangan refers to a Sundanese version of wayang dance drama, developed in the Priangan region in the heartland of West Java. Wayang wong Priangan developed in the late nineteenth century, peaked in the regencies of Bandung, Sumedang, Garut and Sukabumi in the period before World War II, and receded by the late 1960s as audiences waned. In the Sundanese tradition, the most prevalent wayang tradition is wayang golek, a wooden rod puppet performance. Nevertheless, the wayang-themed dance drama performance also exists, usually performed in Sundanese sandiwara traditional drama form.

=== Wayang gedog ===
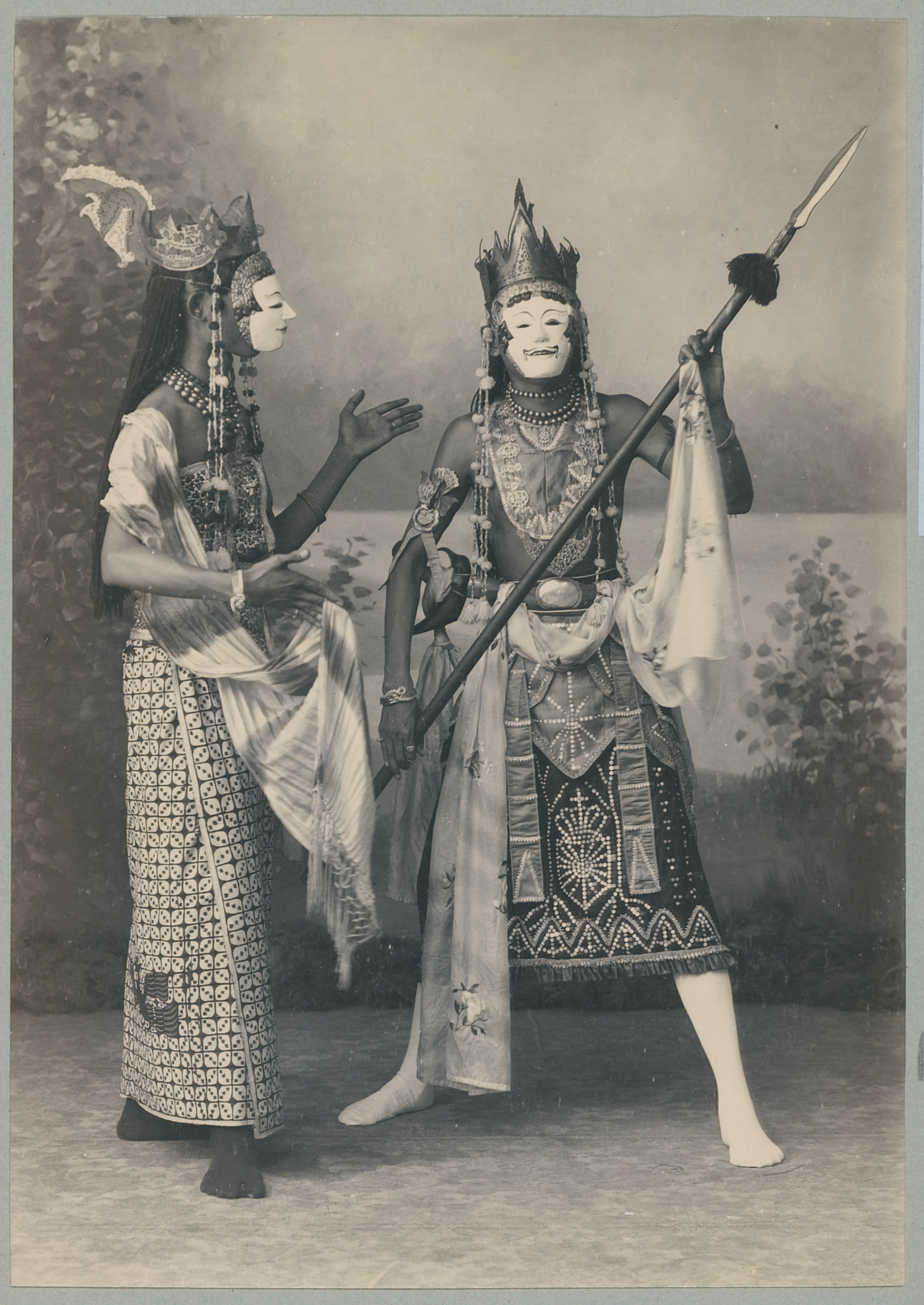
Wayang gedog, masked wayang in Surabaya c. 1905

Wayang gedog (lit. "masked wayang"), another form of wayang wong performance, is usually considered to be a cross between wayang wong and the topeng dance. These performances take themes from the Panji cycle stories about the kingdom of Janggala. Players wear masks known as wayang topeng or wayang gedog. The word gedog comes from kedok, which, like topeng means "mask". The main theme is a love story about Princess Candra Kirana of Kediri and Raden Panji Asmarabangun, the crown prince of Janggala. Candra Kirana was the incarnation of Dewi Ratih (the Hindu goddess of love), and Panji was an incarnation of Kamajaya (the Hindu god of love). Candra Kirana's story has been given the title "Smaradahana" ("The fire of love"). At the end of the complicated story, they finally marry and produce a son. Panji Asmarabangun ruled Janggala under the official names of "Sri Kameswara", "Prabu Suryowiseso", and "Hino Kertapati".

== Dance style ==
Wayang wong has fixed patterns of movement and costume:

For male performers:

- Alus: very slow, elegant and smooth movement. For example, the dance of Arjuna, Puntadewa and all other refined and slimly built kshatriyas. There are two types of movement, lanyap and luruh.
- Gagah: a more masculine and powerful dance movement, used commonly for the roles of strongly built kshatriyas, soldiers and generals.
  - Kambeng: a more powerful and athletic dance, used for the roles of Bima, Antareja, and Ghatotkacha.
  - Bapang: gagah and kasar for the warriors of antagonist roles such as Kaurawa.
  - Kalang kinantang: falls somewhere between alus and gagah, danced by tall, slim dancers in the roles of Kresno or Suteja.
- Kasar: a coarse style, used in portraying evil characters such as Rakshasa, ogres and demons.
- Gecul: a funny court jester and commoners, portraying ponokawan and cantrik.
  - Kambeng dengklik: for ape warriors, such as Hanuman.
  - Kalang kinantang dengklik: for ape warriors, such as Sugriwa and Subali.

For female performers:

The movements known as nggruda or ngenceng encot in the classical high style of dance consist of nine basic movements (joged pokok) and twelve other movements (joged gubahan and joged wirogo) and are used in performing the bedoyo and srimpi.

Today, the wayang wong, following the Gagrak style of Surakarta, is danced by women. They follow the alus movements associated with a kshatriya, resembling Arjuna. In the Gagkra style from Yogyakarta, a male dancer uses these same alus movements to depict princes and generals. There are about 45 distinct character types.

== Performances ==
Performances of wayang wong are regularly staged in the Javanese cultural heartlands, the court cities of Yogyakarta and Surakarta (Solo). The national capital Jakarta also stages wayang wong performances, although they are not always well-publicised.

=== Yogyakarta ===
A series of well-known dramatic monthly evening performances of wayang wong from the Ramayana is performed all year round at the Prambanan temple near Yogyakarta. The most complete Ramayana wayang wong involving more than a hundred dancers, artists and gamelan musicians is performed only during the dry season (usually May to October) on a large, open-air stage with the Prambanan Trimurti temples as the background. During the monsoon rainy season, however, the performance is moved into a smaller indoor theatre nearby. In downtown Yogyakarta, on the eastern side of Keraton Yogyakarta, the Ramayana wayang wong is also performed every night, starting at 8 p.m. at Purawisata theatre, Jalan Brigjen Katamso, Yogyakarta.

=== Surakarta ===
Episodes from the Mahabharata and Ramayana are often performed daily in the Wayang Orang Sriwedari theatre in Sriwedari Cultural Park at Jalan Slamet Riyadi 275, Surakarta city, in Central Java. This daily performance starts at 8.15 p.m. every night, except on Sundays.

=== Jakarta ===
In Jakarta the Wayang Orang Bharata group, one of the oldest wayang orang groups existing in Jakarta, generally stages performances in the Bharata Theatre just north of Pasar Senen near the centre of the city each Saturday night. The Bharata Theatre, which seats around 300 people, was renovated with funds from the Jakarta city government in the early 2000s. The performances are often based around stories of conflict between clans drawn from the Mahabharata. Presentations involve traditional Javanese dancing, stylised fighting, and periods of dialogue, accompanied by music from a substantial gamelan orchestra. Actors representing the well-known Punokawan clowns, including the much-loved Semar, usually involve themselves in the action, often poking considerable fun at the self-important lives that the princes and high-born warriors lead. Ticket prices are relatively modest, with even the best seats in the Bharata Theatre generally costing (early 2013) less than $US 10 per person.

Other than the weekly wayang wong performances of Bharata in the Senen area, Jakarta has sometimes staged special annual wayang orang performances in Gedung Kesenian Jakarta near Pasar Baru in Central Jakarta, Taman Ismail Marzuki, or in Gedung Pewayangan Kautaman, near Taman Mini Indonesia Indah. These are not routine performances; schedules should be inquired about in advance at those theatres. There are several wayang wong troupes in Jakarta, such as Swargaloka, Senawangi, Puspobudoyo and Sekar Budaya Nusantara.

=== Television ===
Wayang wong performances are sometimes aired on television, such as on TVRI and World of Wayang on Kompas TV.

== Gallery ==
Some examples of wayang wong scenes

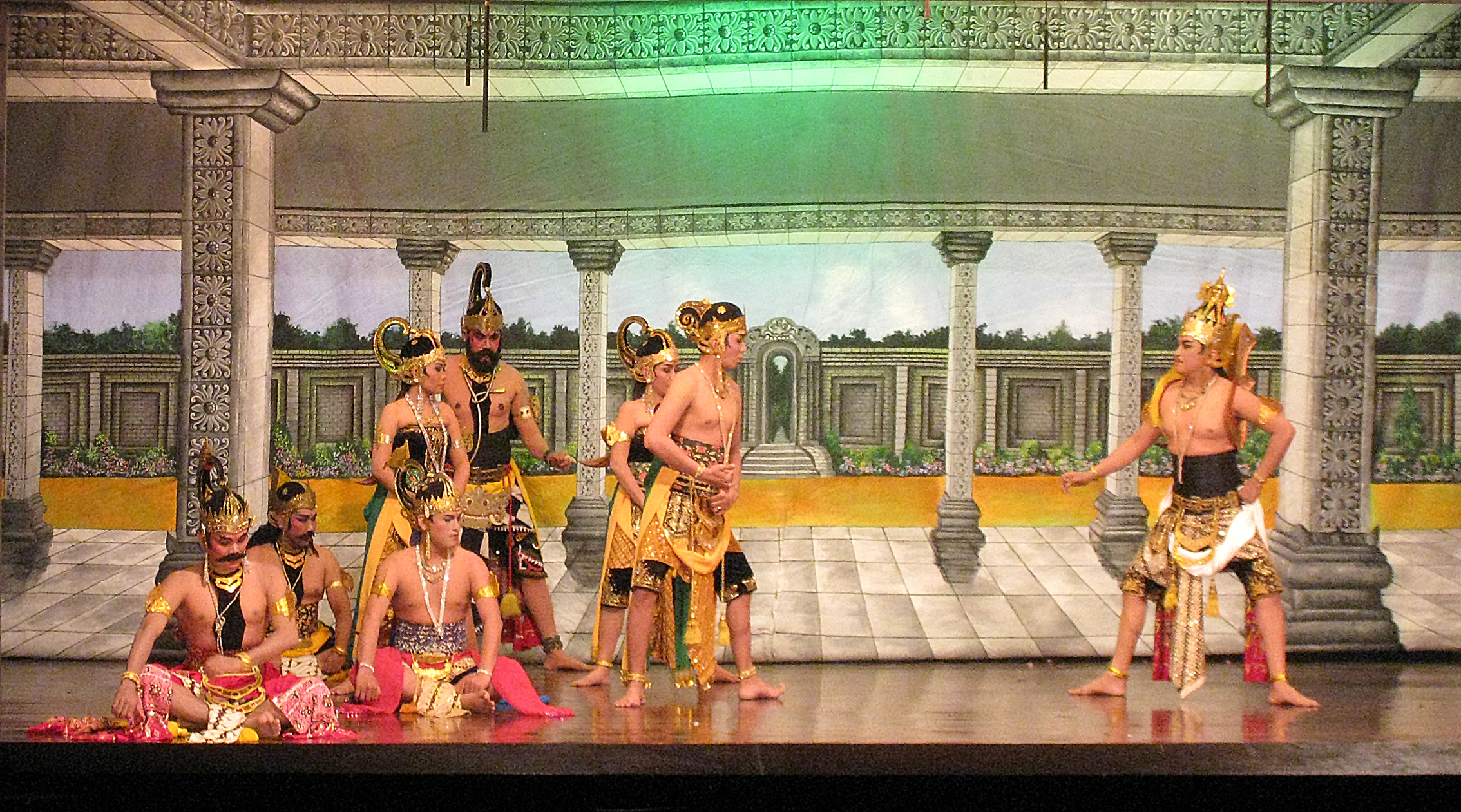
Pandava and Krishna in a wayang wong performance

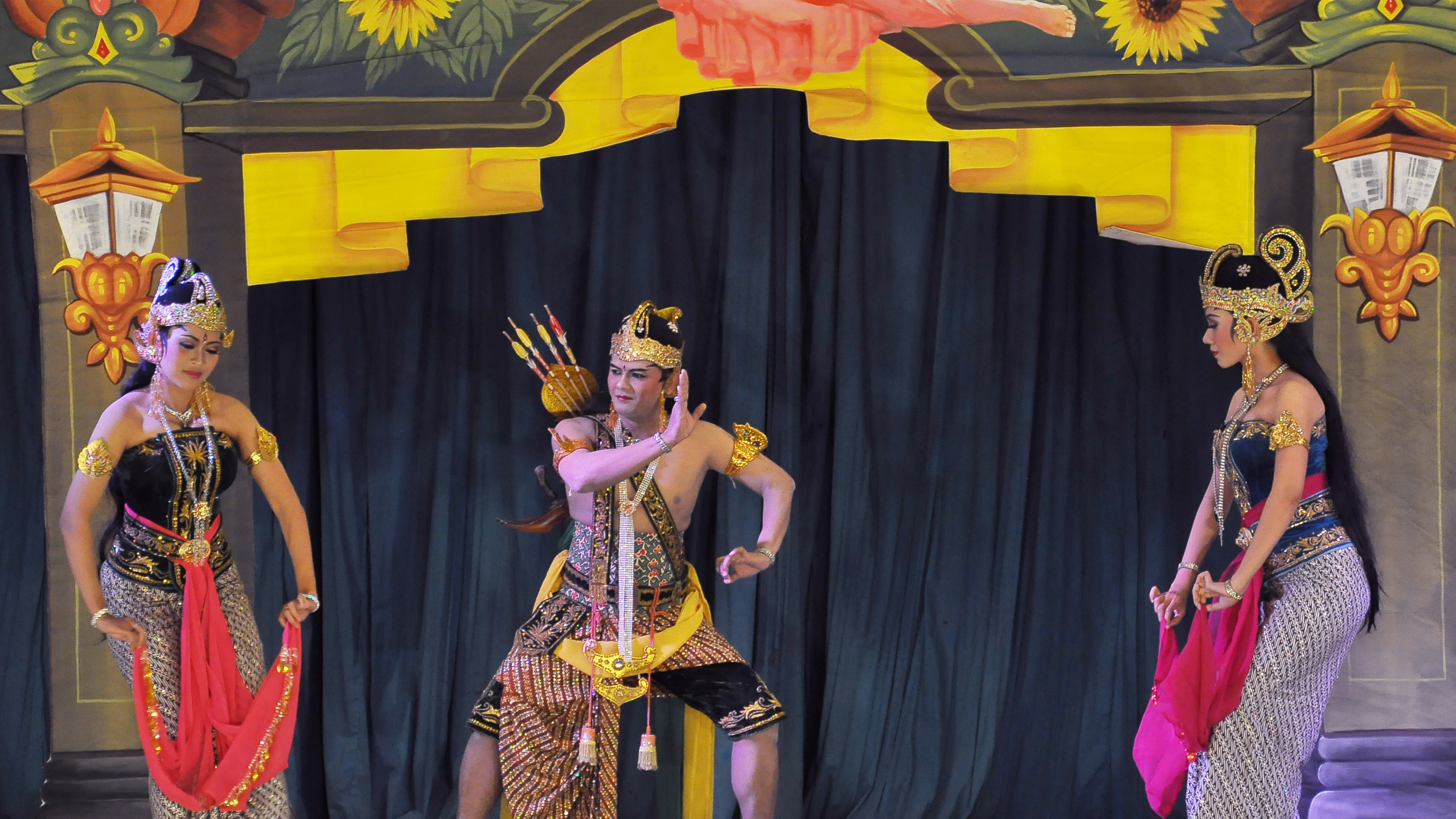
King Duryodhana in a wayang wong performance in Taman Budaya Rahmat Saleh, Semarang, Jawa Tengah, Indonesia

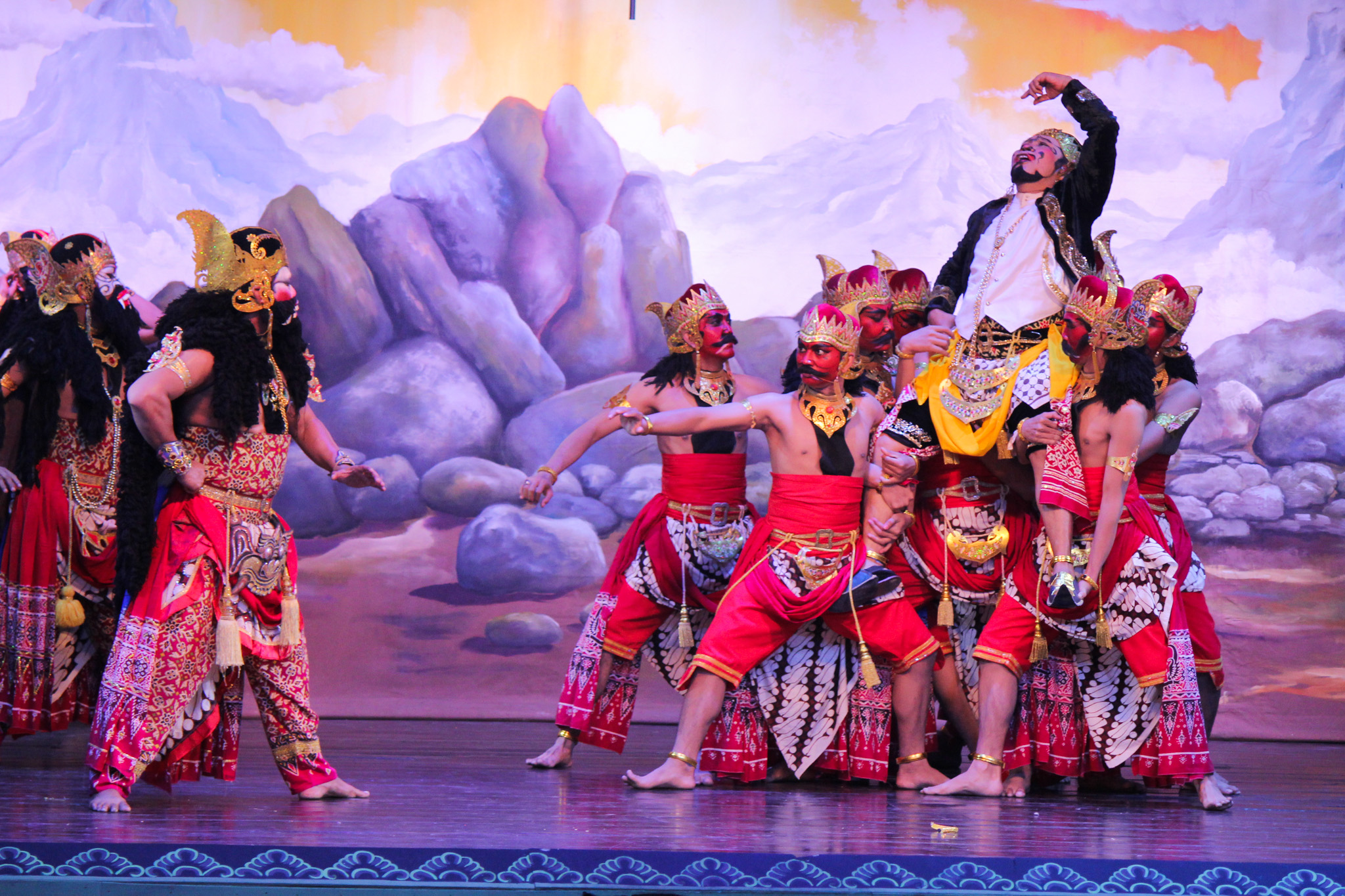
Giants in a wayang wong performance

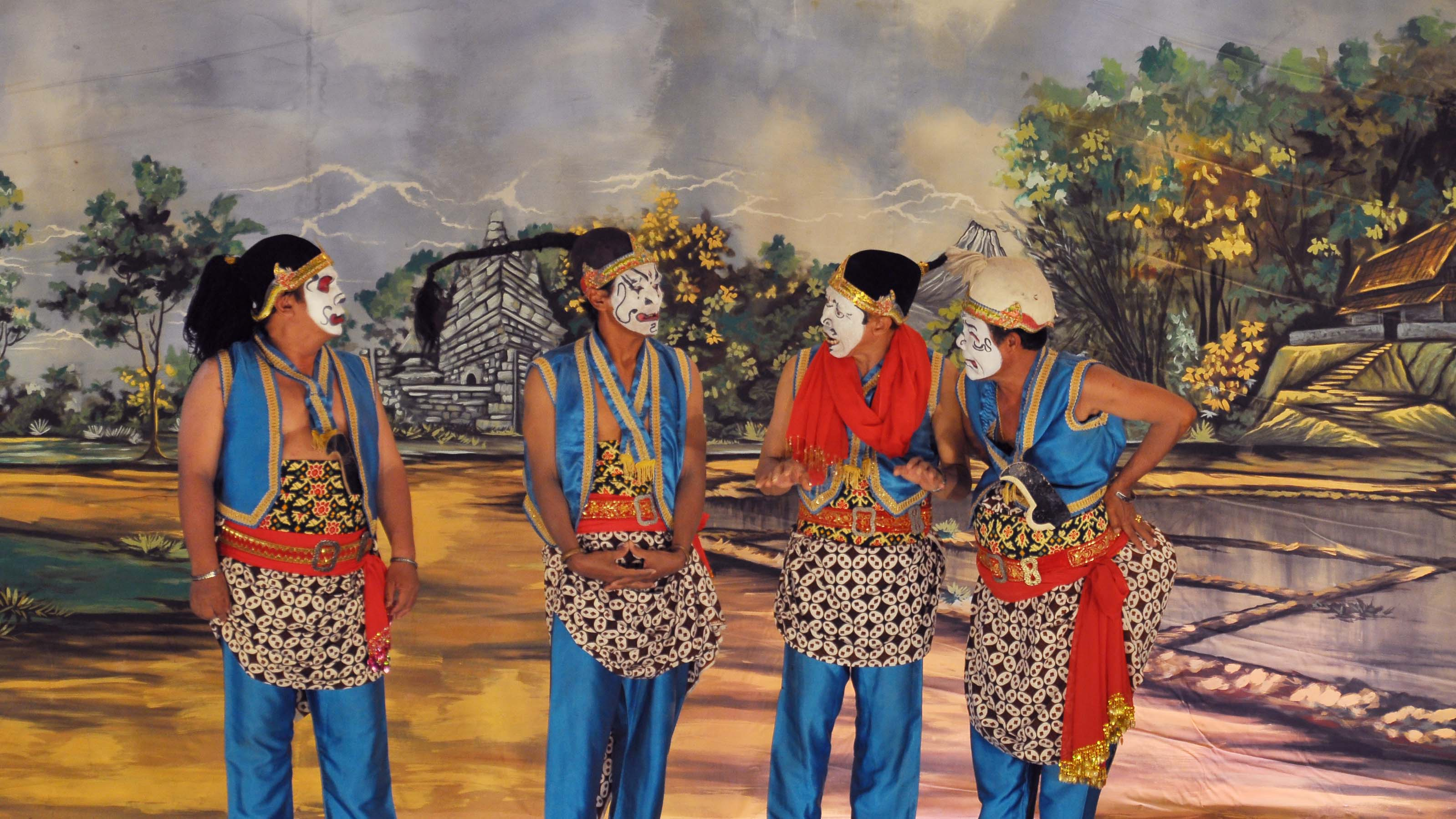
Punokawan in a wayang wong performance

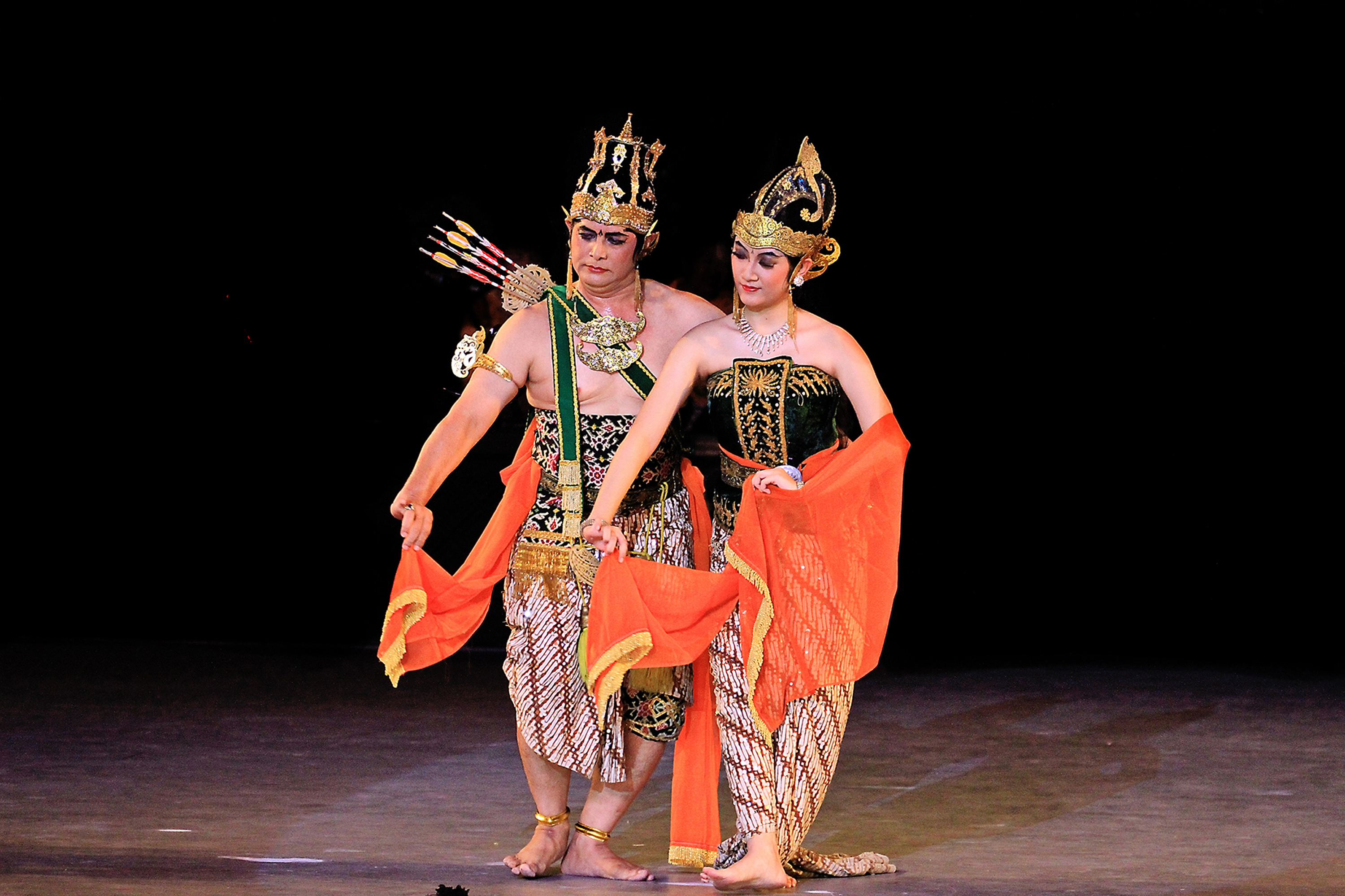
Rama and Shinta in a wayang wong Ramayana Ballet performance

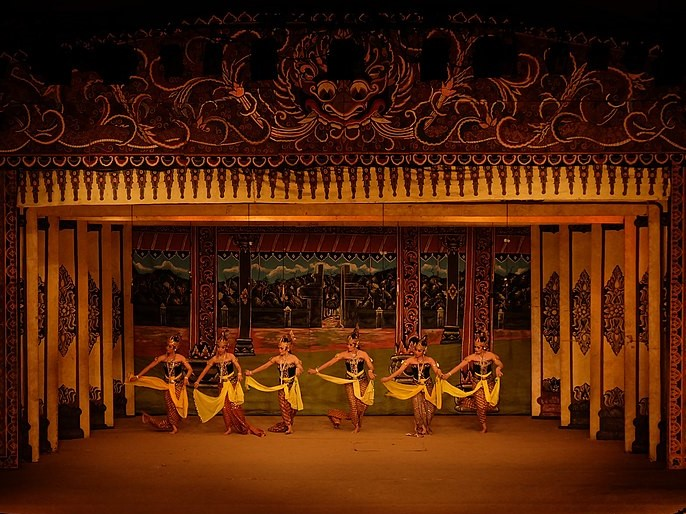
Opening of wayang wong performance, usually showing traditional Javanese dance

== See also ==
- Bambangan cakil
- Dance in Indonesia
- Ramayana Ballet
- Theatre of Indonesia
- Khon, Thai equivalent
