= Ngesti Pandawa =

Indonesian wayang wong art company

Ngesti Pandawa is an Indonesian Wayang Wong dance troupe based in Semarang, Central Java. It is one of the three remaining traditional Wayang Wong troupes in Indonesia.

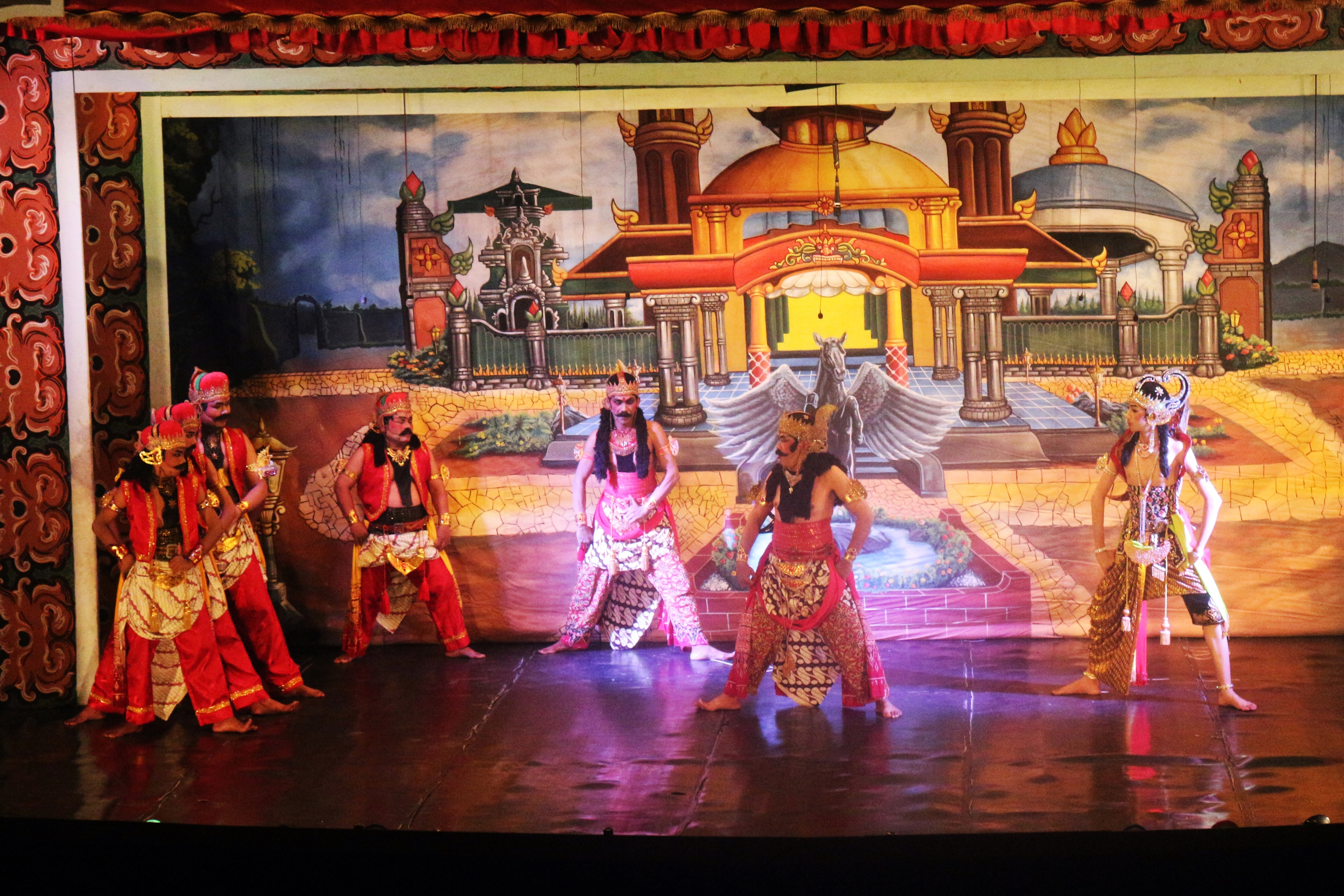
Wayang Orang Ngesti Pandawa

== History ==
Ngesti Pandawa was founded in Madiun by Sastro Sabdo on July 2, 1937 to revive the art of Wayang Wong Panggung. This form of Wayang features human actors performing on a proscenium stage, blending elements of Wayang wong traditionally staged in pendhapa (the open hall of Javanese noble residences) with certain aspects of Western theater.^{[a]}

The first Wayang Wong Panggung troupe was established in 1895 by Gan Kan, a Chinese entrepreneur from Surakarta (Solo). After the successful establishment of the troupe, Sastro Sabdo's efforts were supported by Sastro Sudirdjo, Narto Sabdo, Darso Sabdo, and Kusni.

Since its founding, Wayang Wong Ngesti Pandawa has performed for Javanese, Dutch, and Chinese communities. However, due to social and political conditions in Indonesia during that period, the troupe moved between various locations before eventually settling in Semarang in 1954 to continue performing. They eventually settled in Semarang, Indonesia.

In 1954, with the support of Mayor Hadisoebeno, the troupe was granted use of Gedung Rakyat Indonesia Semarang (GRIS) building at Jalan Pemuda 116, allowing them to stage regular performances.

During the 1960s and 1970s, the troupe was led by Sastro Sabdo and Narto Sabdo. During this period, the troupe collaborated with Ki Nartosabdho to develop gending-gendingan (a form of traditional instrumental composition) used in their performances. The troupe's technical approach, with its use of theatrical scenery, musical accompaniment, costumes, choreography, and stage effects, was later adopted by other wayang orang groups.^{[c]}

The troupe performed for President Sukarno. Following the 1953 eruption of Mount Merapi, Ngesti Pandawa helped raised funds for the victims. In recognition, President Sukarno invited the troupe to perform at the Istana Merdeka (Merdeka Palace) in Jakarta and the Istana Negara (State Palace) in Bogor. In 1962, Ngesti Pandawa received the Wijayakusuma Award from the president.

In 1994, the local government sold the GRIS building, forcing Ngesti Pandawa to relocate to the Taman Raden Saleh Cultural Complex for two years. In 1996, the troupe moved to the Majapahit Amusement Park and established the Wayang Orang Ngesti Pandawa Foundation.

In 2001, the local government permitted the group to use a hall at the Taman Raden Saleh cultural complex, where it continues to perform three days a week, with regular shows on Saturday evenings from 8:00 pm.

== Current status ==
Wayang Orang Ngesti Pandawa continues to stage performances from its traditional repertoire every Saturday evening. In addition to the live shows, the group engages with the community and visitors through its social media platforms, such as Facebook, Instagram, eAskme, and YouTube, as well as its official website.

In addition to its regular performances in Semarang, Ngesti Pandawa has also staged shows in cities including Sukoharjo, Jepara, Solo, and Jakarta. The group also performs for students and institutions to introduce wayang orang to broader audiences.

Masdiana Safitri, head of Semarang City's Culture and Tourism Office, announced plans to renovate the Ngesti Pandawa venue to improve its facilities for visitors.

== Notes ==
a. Rustopo, 2007
b. Mumpuni, 1986
c. Rinardi, 2002
d. Moehadi, 1987
