= Javanese dances =

Traditional dances of the Javanese people of Indonesia

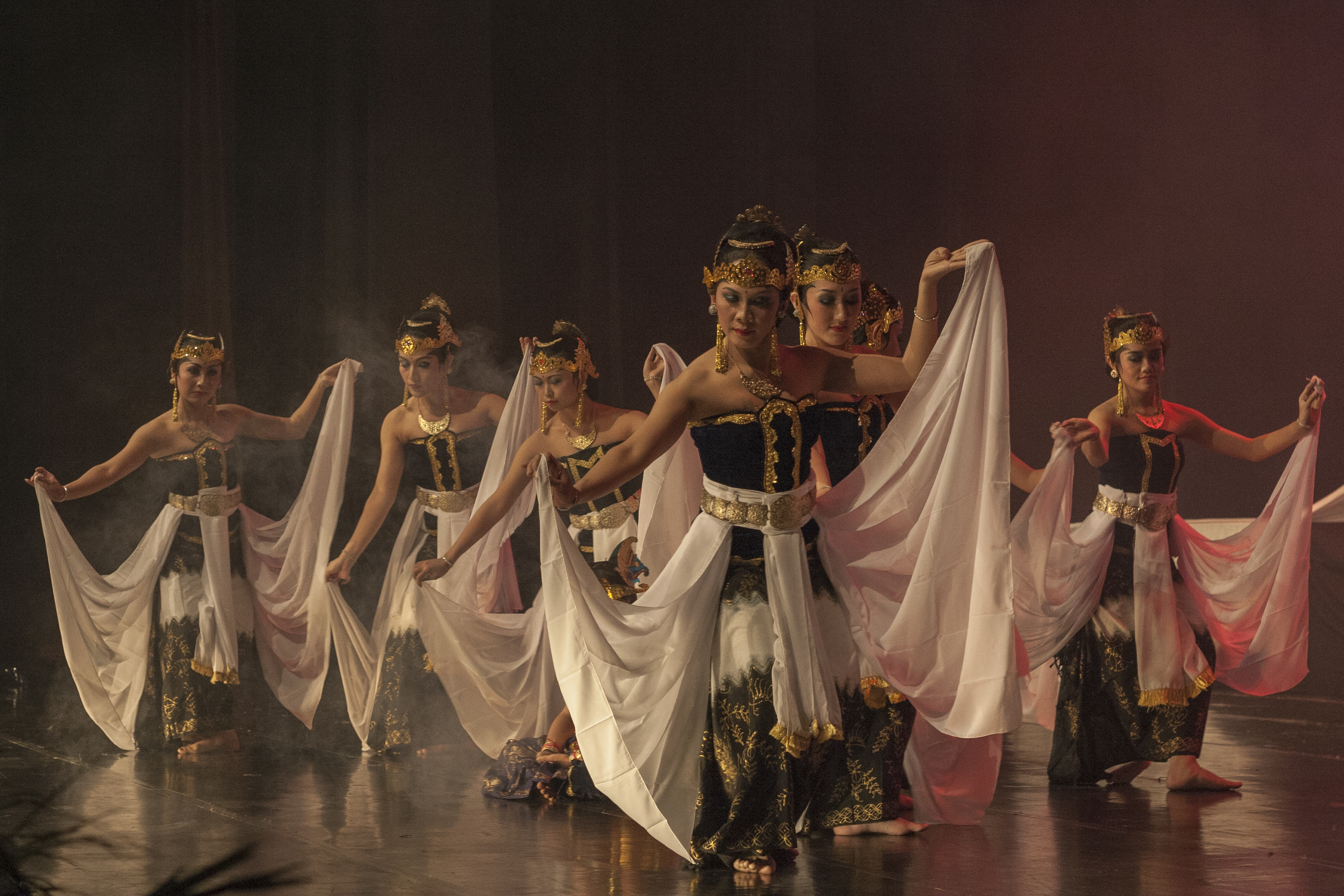
Javanese Bedhaya sacred dance performance

Javanese dance (Indonesian: Tarian Jawa; Javanese: ꦧꦼꦏ꧀ꦱꦤ꧀ꦗꦮ, romanized: Beksan Jawa) is the dances and art forms that were created and influenced by Javanese culture in Indonesia. Javanese dance movement is controlled, deliberate, and refined. Javanese art often displays finesse, and, at the same time, a serene composure which is elevated far above everything mundane. Javanese dance is usually associated with courtly, refined, and sophisticated culture of the Javanese kratons, such as the bedhaya and srimpi dance. However, in a wider sense, Javanese dance also includes the dances of Javanese commoners and villagers, such as ronggeng, tayub, reog, and jaran kepang.

Javanese dance and its discipline has different styles and philosophy compared to other Indonesian dance traditions. Unlike vigorous and expressive Balinese dance or cheerful and slightly sensual Sundanese dance, Javanese dance are commonly involving slow movements and graceful poses. Javanese dance have somewhat a meditative quality and tends to be more self-reflective, introspective and more oriented toward self-understanding. Javanese dance is usually associated with Wayang wong, and the palaces of Yogyakarta and Surakarta due to the nature of dance being a pusaka or sacred heirloom from ancestors of the palace rulers. These expressive dances are more than just dances, they are also used for moral education, emotional expression, and spreading of the Javanese culture.

== Types of Javanese dance ==
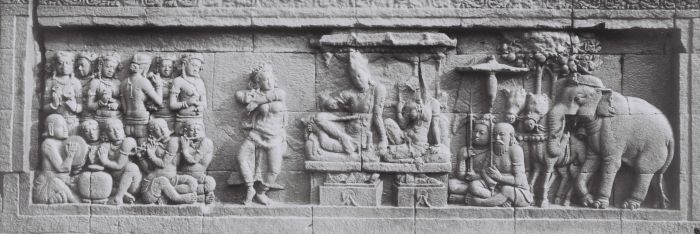
A Javanese dancer is dancing accompanied by an ensemble music player in front of the king and his empress in the Kinnaras Court and six dancers are waiting their turn. The eighth-century bas-relief of Borobudur Temple, Central Java, Indonesia

Javanese dance reflects the stratified hierarchy of Javanese society, and roughly can be identified within two mainstream of traditions:

1. Court dances (tari kraton)
2. Commoner dances (tari rakyat)

=== Court dances (tari kraton) ===
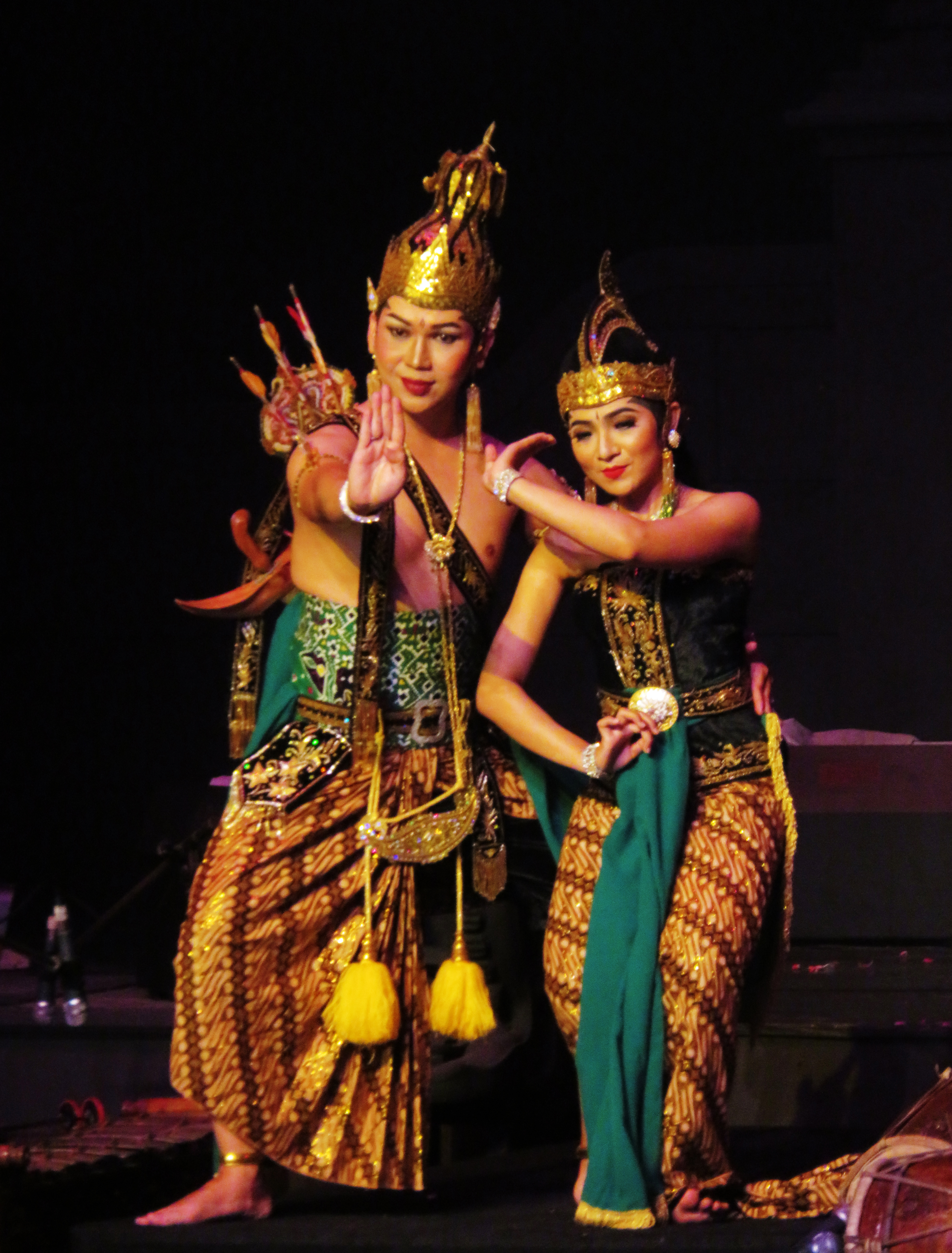
Rama and Shinta in Ramayana Ballet performance near Prambanan temple complex

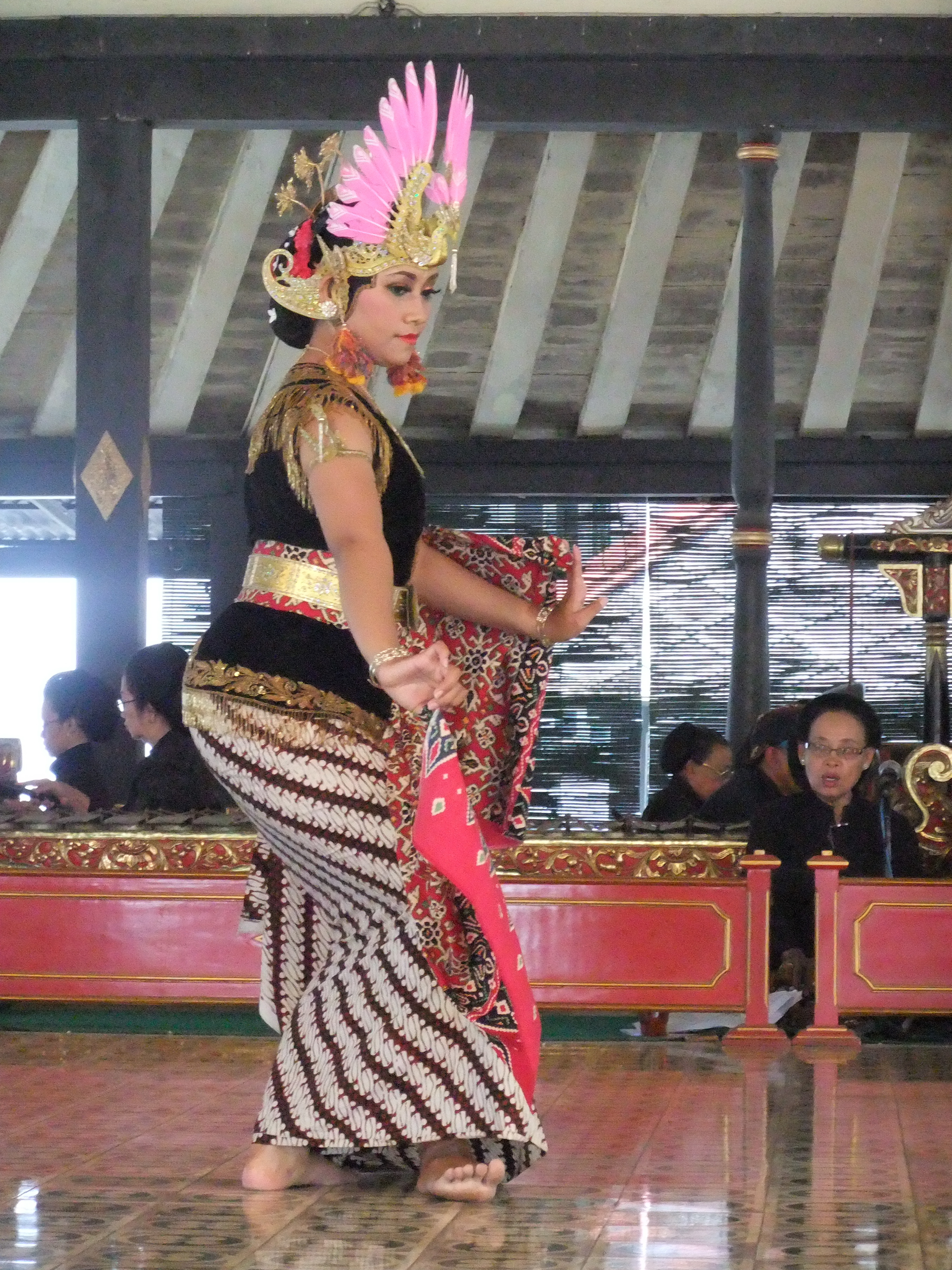
Golek Ayun-ayun, a Javanese court dance of Yogyakarta

The courtly Javanese palace dance is the type of dances that developed, nurtured and fostered by Javanese Kratons, mainly Yogyakarta Sultanate and Surakarta Sunanate, the patrons of Javanese Mataram culture. Javanese sultans are known as the patron and the creator of Javanese court dances.

Kraton dances employs sets of rules about certain dance movements, body and hand gestures that requires discipline to learn. Gamelan orchestra is the prerequisite for Javanese court dance performances as well as for other Javanese art forms such as Wayang performances. The serene elegance, slow pace and constrains of its movements gave Javanese dance a meditative traits. Javanese court dances were heavily influenced by Javanese Hindu-Buddhist legacy. As the result the costumes, jewelry and story, often reflects or based on Hindu epic tales of Ramayana and Mahabharata.

There are three basic types of courtly Javanese kraton dance:

1. Beksan putra – These are the dances for men, which serve two purposes: a military close-order drill and highlighting martial skills. Dancers may learn beksan putra dances to familiarize themselves with the movements for narrative dances.
2. Beksan putri – Putri is the Javanese word for female, and these dances include courtly dances designed for royal events with very precise movements and distinct staging with subtle layers of meaning. Such dances were often used for entertainment or courtship.
3. Beksan wayang – These are narrative dances from epic poems, and usually are named after the characters in them, usually an alus-style hero and a gagah-style villain.

==== Bedhaya ====
Surakarta

- Bedhaya Ketawang
- Bedhaya Pangkur
- Bedhaya Duradasih
- Bedhaya Mangunkarya
- Bedhaya Sinom
- Bedhaya Endhol-endhol
- Bedhaya Gandrungmanis
- Bedhaya Kabor
- Bedhaya Tejanata
- Bedhaya Dempel
- Bedhaya La la
- Bedhaya To lu
- Bedhaya Alok

Yogyakarta

- Bedhaya Semang
- Bedhaya Tirta Hayuningrat
- Bedhaya Bedhah Madiun
- Bedhaya Partha Krama
- Bedhaya Sinom

Mangkunegara

- Bedhaya Anglir Mendung
- Bedhaya Bedhah Madiun

Pakualam

- Bedhaya Angron Akung
- etc.
Some examples of Bedhaya dance

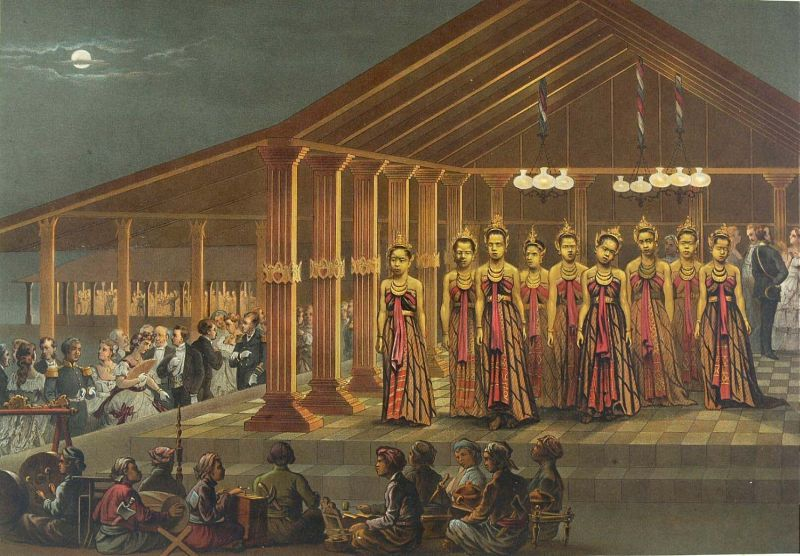
The court of the Sultan of Yogyakarta, c. 1876. Performance of Bedhaya Sacred Dance accompanied by Javanese Gamelan Ensemble.

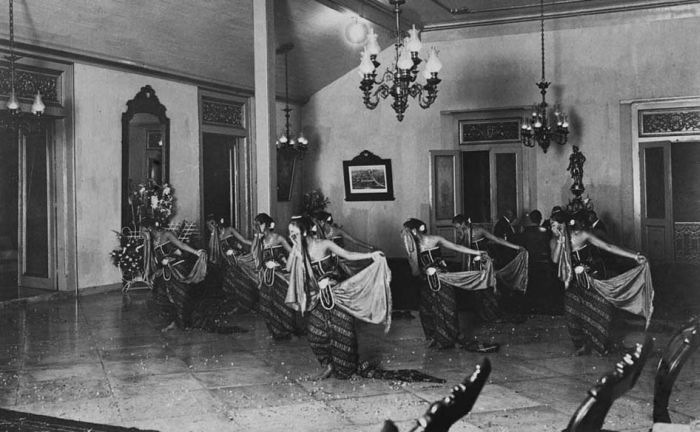
Bedhaya dance performance at the wedding in Mangkunegaran Palace, Solo, Java, in January 1921.

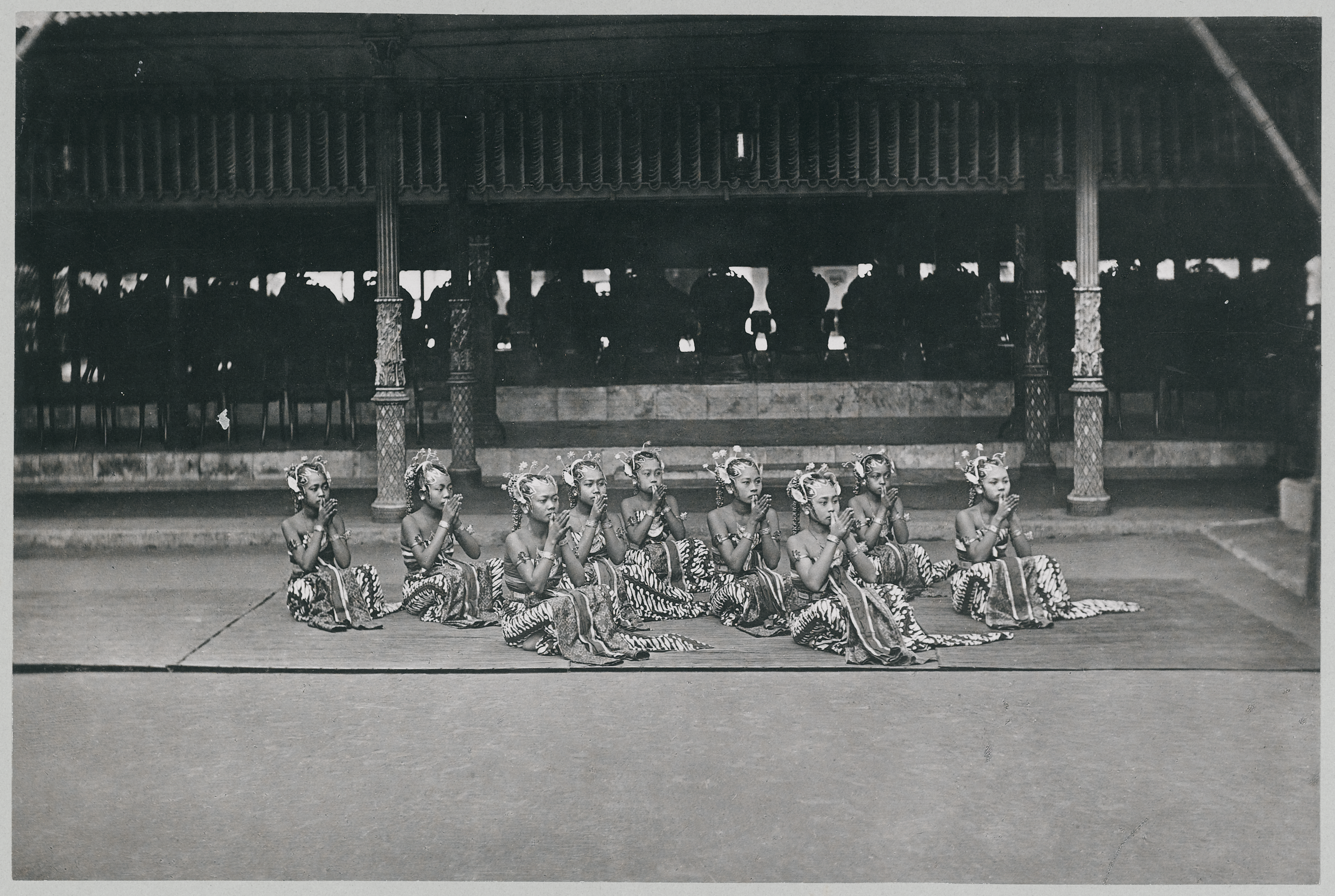
The bedhaya dancers doing a sembah (tribute) to the Sultan of Yogyakarta in 1884.

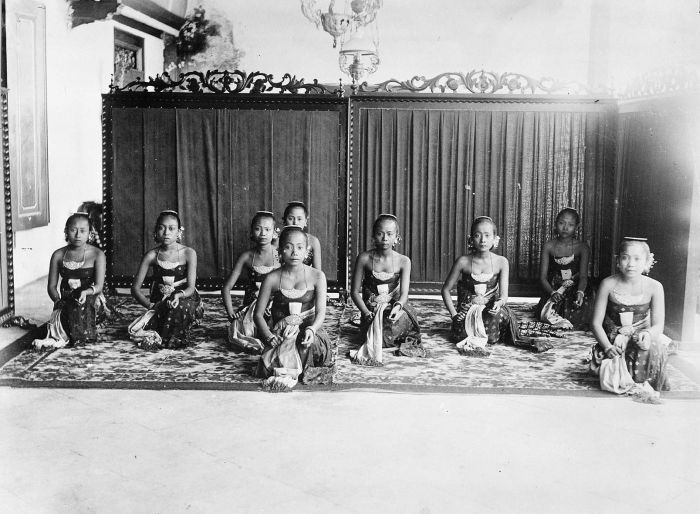
The Bedoyo dancers at the Susuhunan Palace Solo, Surakarta, between 1910 and 1930.

==== Srimpi ====
Surakarta

- Serimpi Ludira Madu
- Serimpi Sangupati
- Serimpi Gondokusuma
- Srimpi Renggowati

Yogyakarta

- Srimpi Pandelori
- Srimpi Jebeng
- Srimpi Muncar
- Srimpi Pramugari

Mangkunegara

- Serimpi Anglir Mendung

Pakualam

- Srimpi Renyep
- etc.
Some examples of Srimpi dance

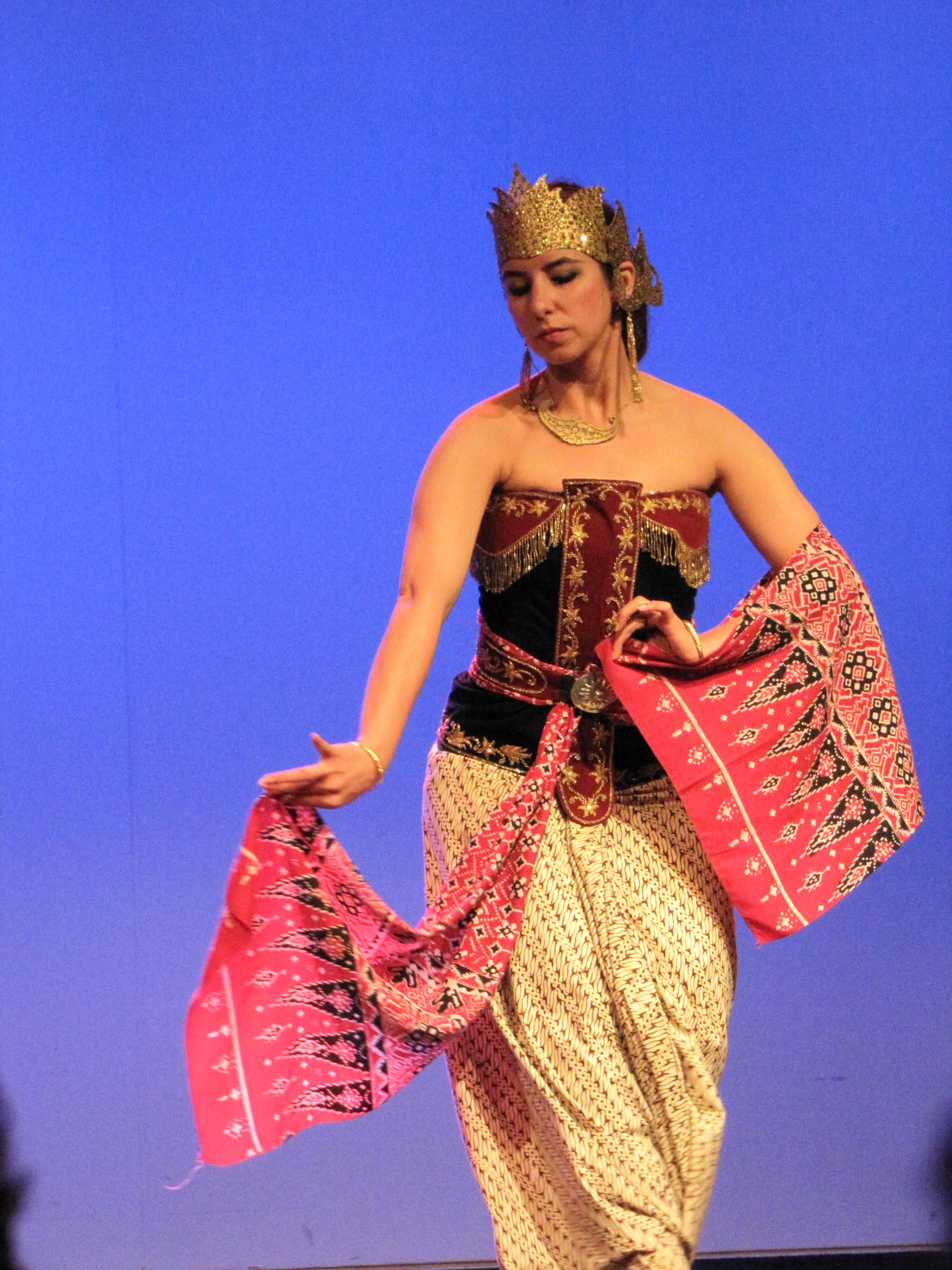
The elegant dance of Srimpi.

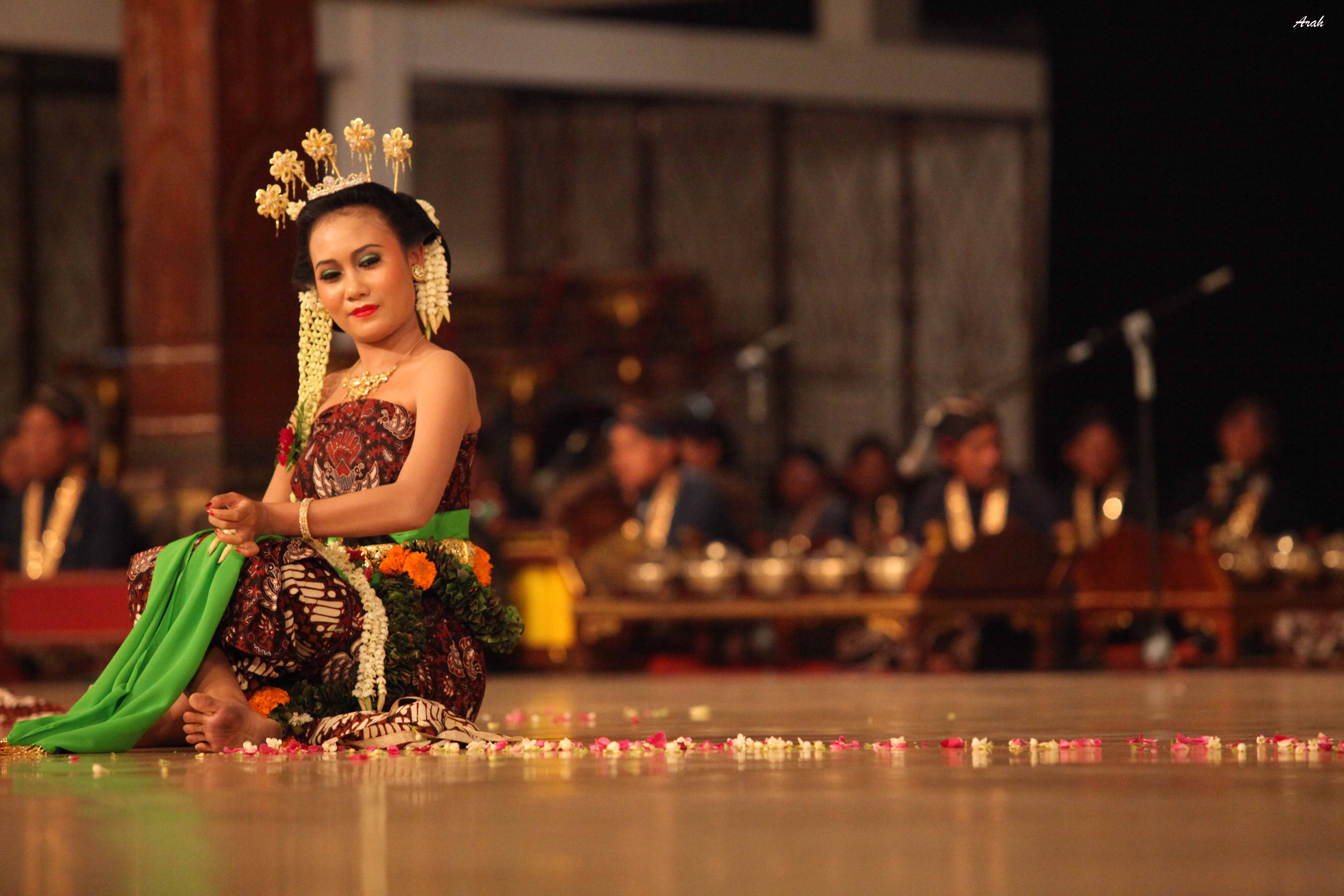
Srimpi Dhempel.

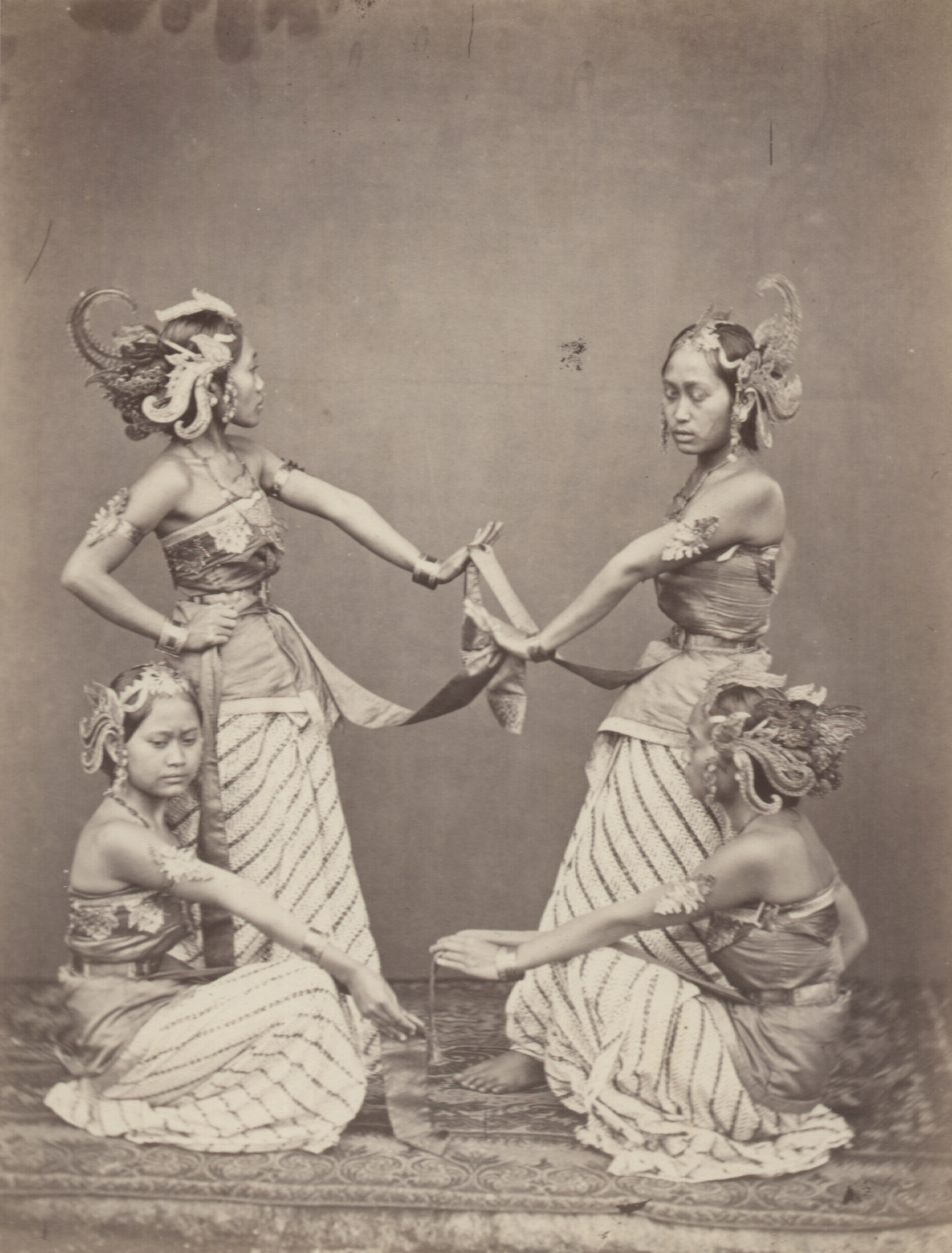
"Serimpi" dancers of the Regent of Bandung (circa 1864)

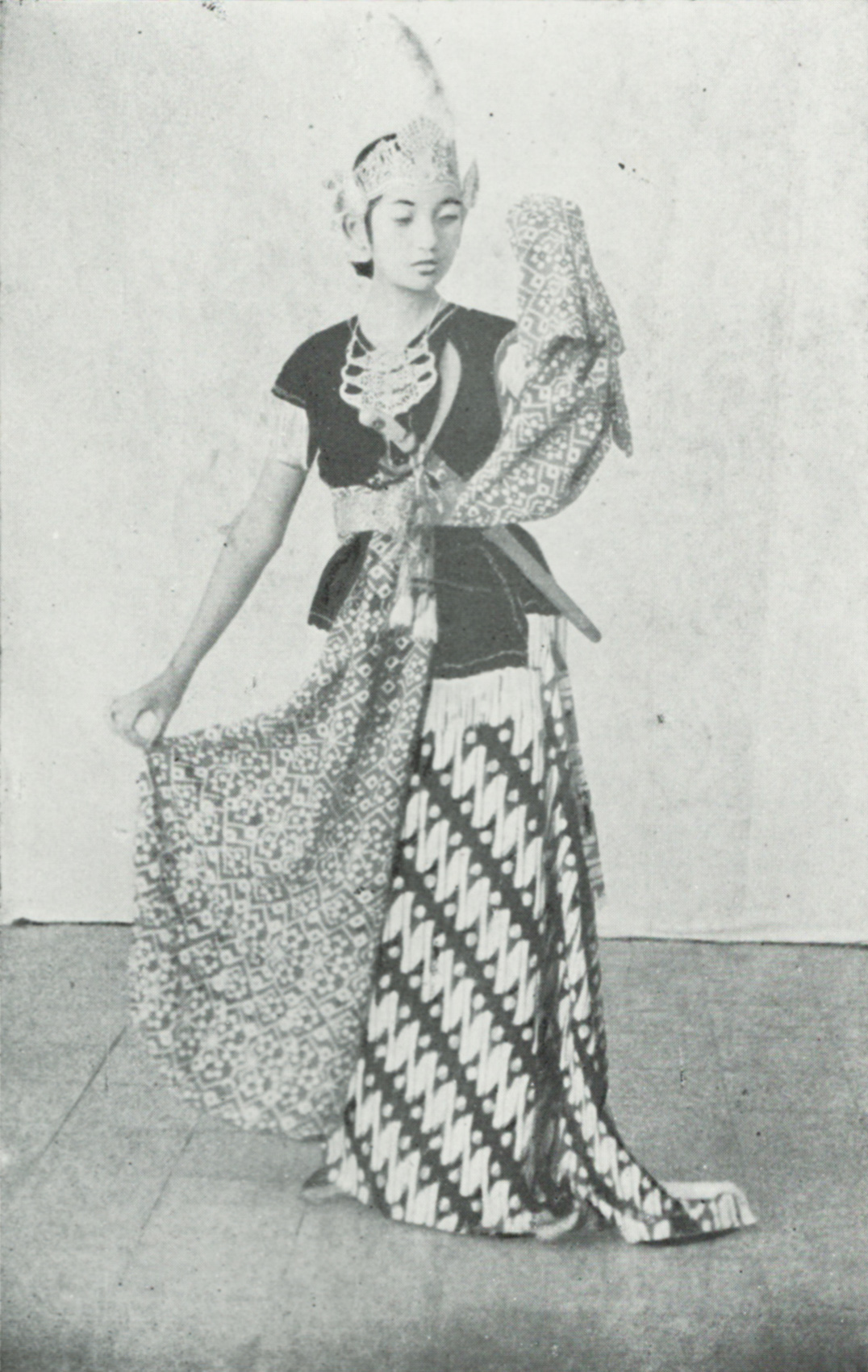
Srimpi Dancer in Yogyakarta.

==== Golek ====
- Golek lambang sari
- Bondan
- Bambangan Cakil
- Topeng
- Banda Baya
- Wiropratomo
- Golek Menak
- etc.

==== Gambyong ====
- Gambyong Retno Kusumo
- Gambyong Pare Anom
- etc.

==== Beksan ====
- Beksan Lawung
- Beksan Anglingkusuma
- Beksan Jangerana
- Beksan Panji Ketawang
- Beksan Wireng
- Klana Raja
- Klana Alus

==== Wayang wong ====
- Wayang wong
Some examples of Javanese court dances

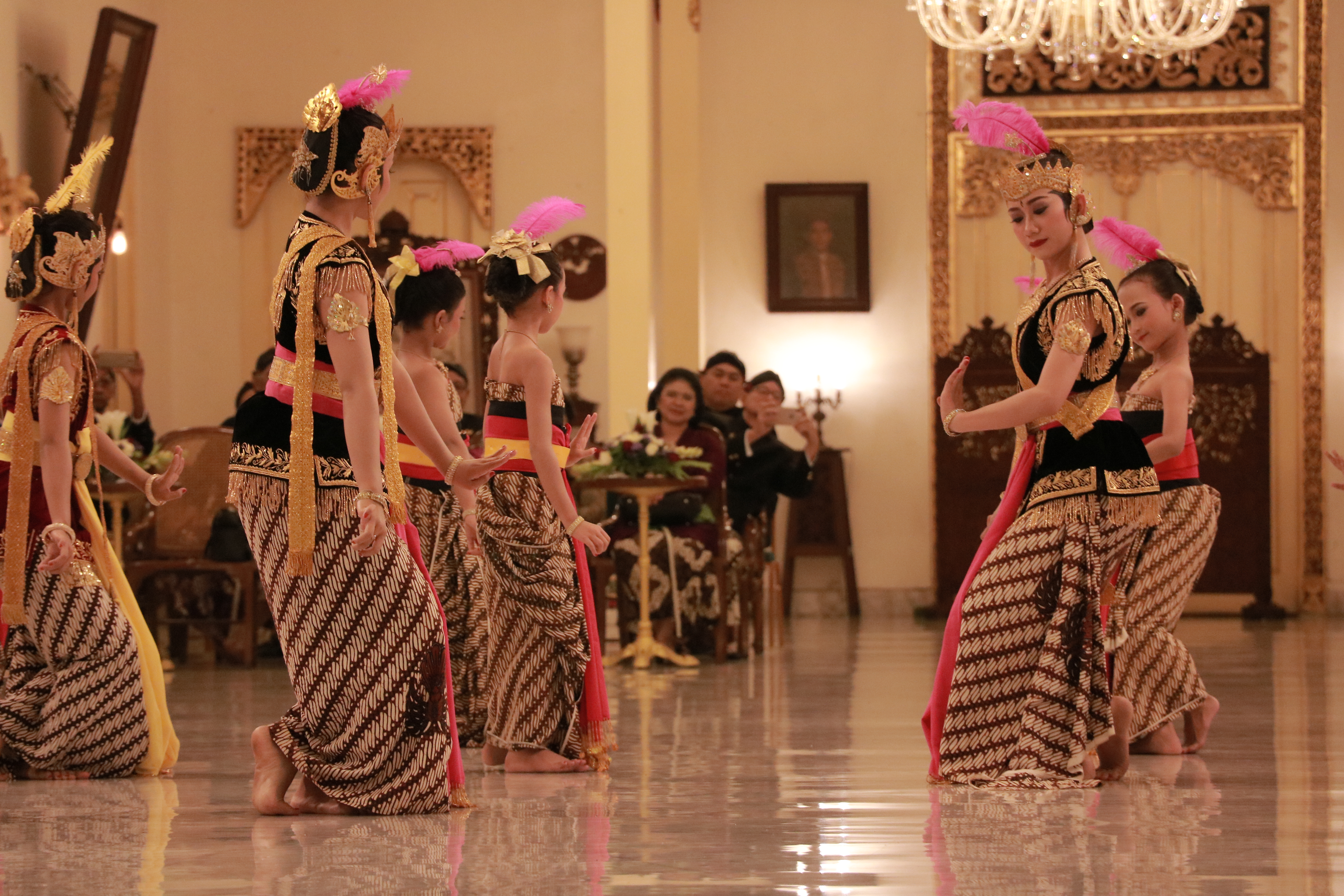
Beksan Puri Melati dance

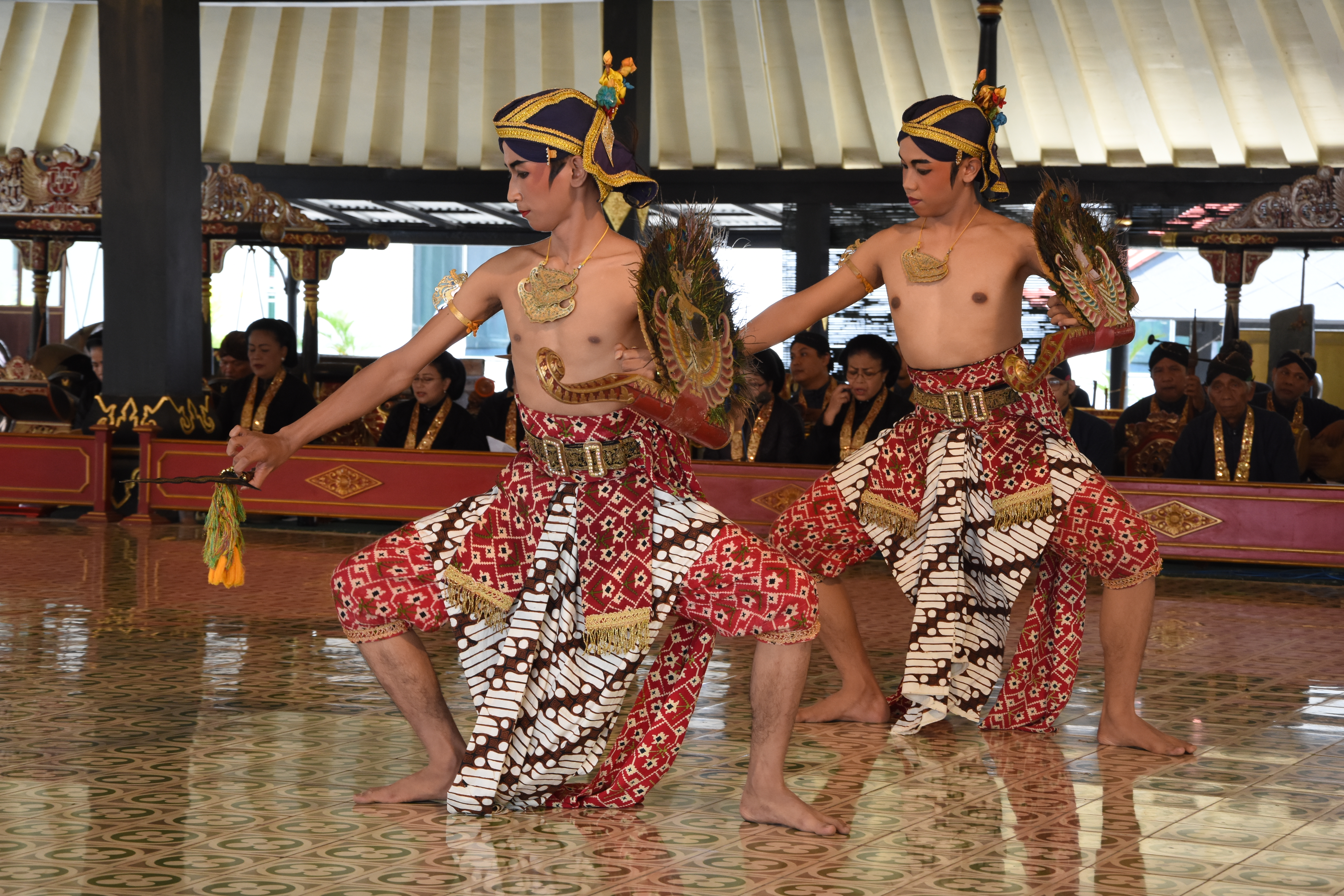
Beksan Jebeng dance

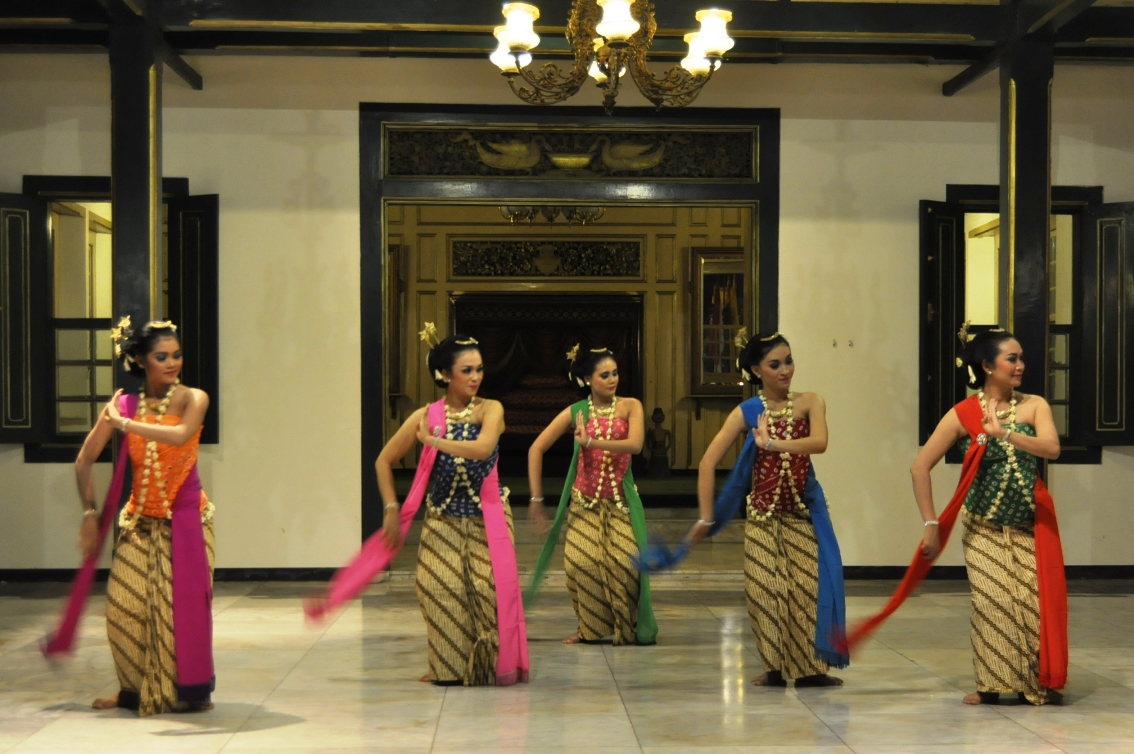
Gambyong Langenkusuma dance

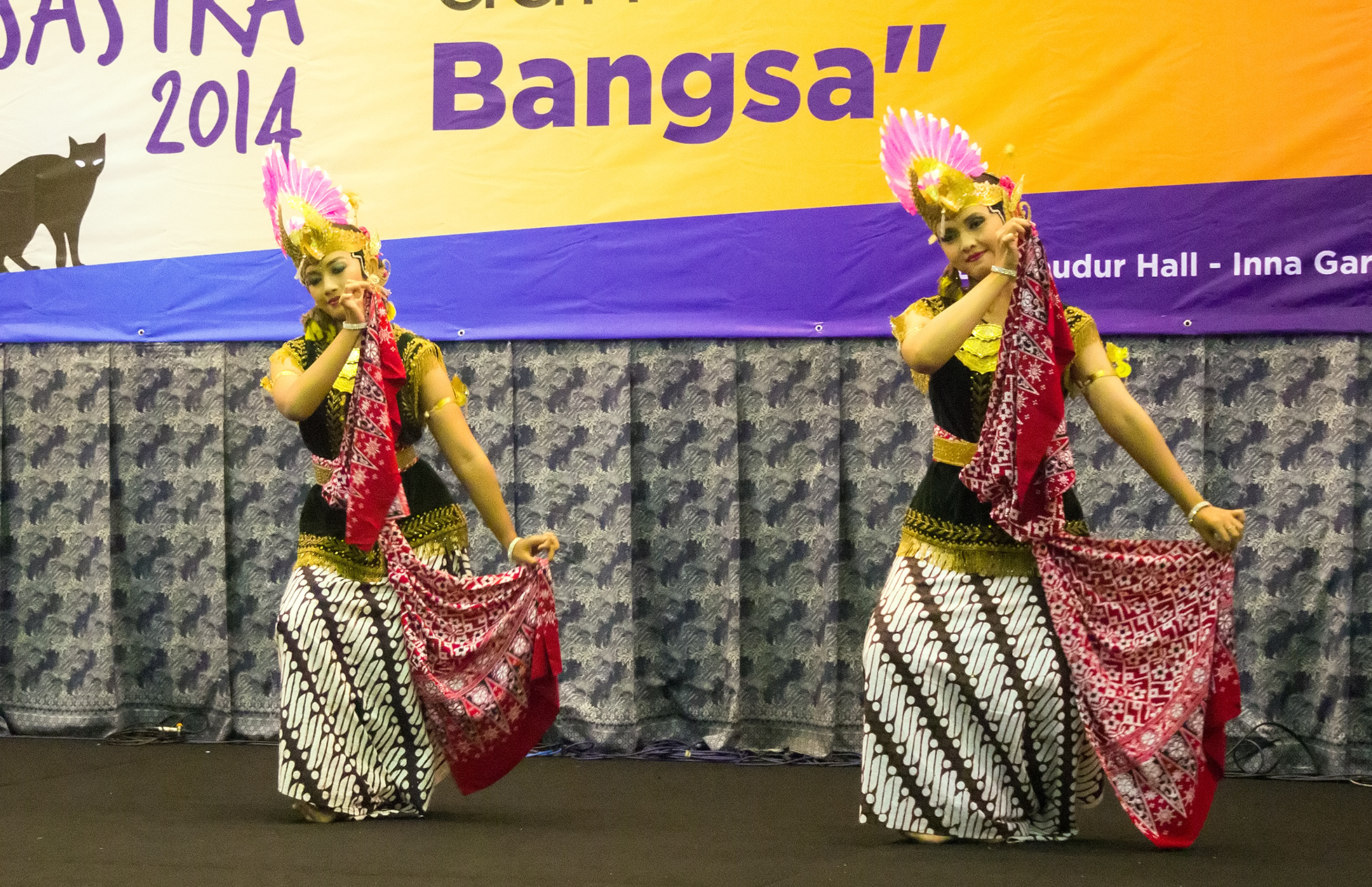
Javanese-style dance at the 8th Malam Anugerah Sastra, Inna Garuda, Yogyakarta

=== Commoner dances (tari rakyat) ===
==== Remo ====
It's the popular dances of the commoner. This is the type of Javanese dances that developed in villages or cities that located relatively quite far from Javanese kratons as the center of Javanese palace culture. Kawulo dances is lack in Javanese courtly dance discipline, constraints, and refinements. This type of dance relatively more open and adaptive to local preference as well as foreign influences.

Several dance forms function as courtship or social dance such as ronggeng, gandrung and tayub, while others are celebratory dances such as reog and kuda lumping. The movement of social dances, such as ronggeng and tayub are more vigorous and often erotic, closely related to Sundanese jaipongan. Because of the erotic nuances, those who perform this type of dance are sometimes perceived as intentionally being suggestive or even openly advertising sexual favors.

Some examples of Javanese commoner dances

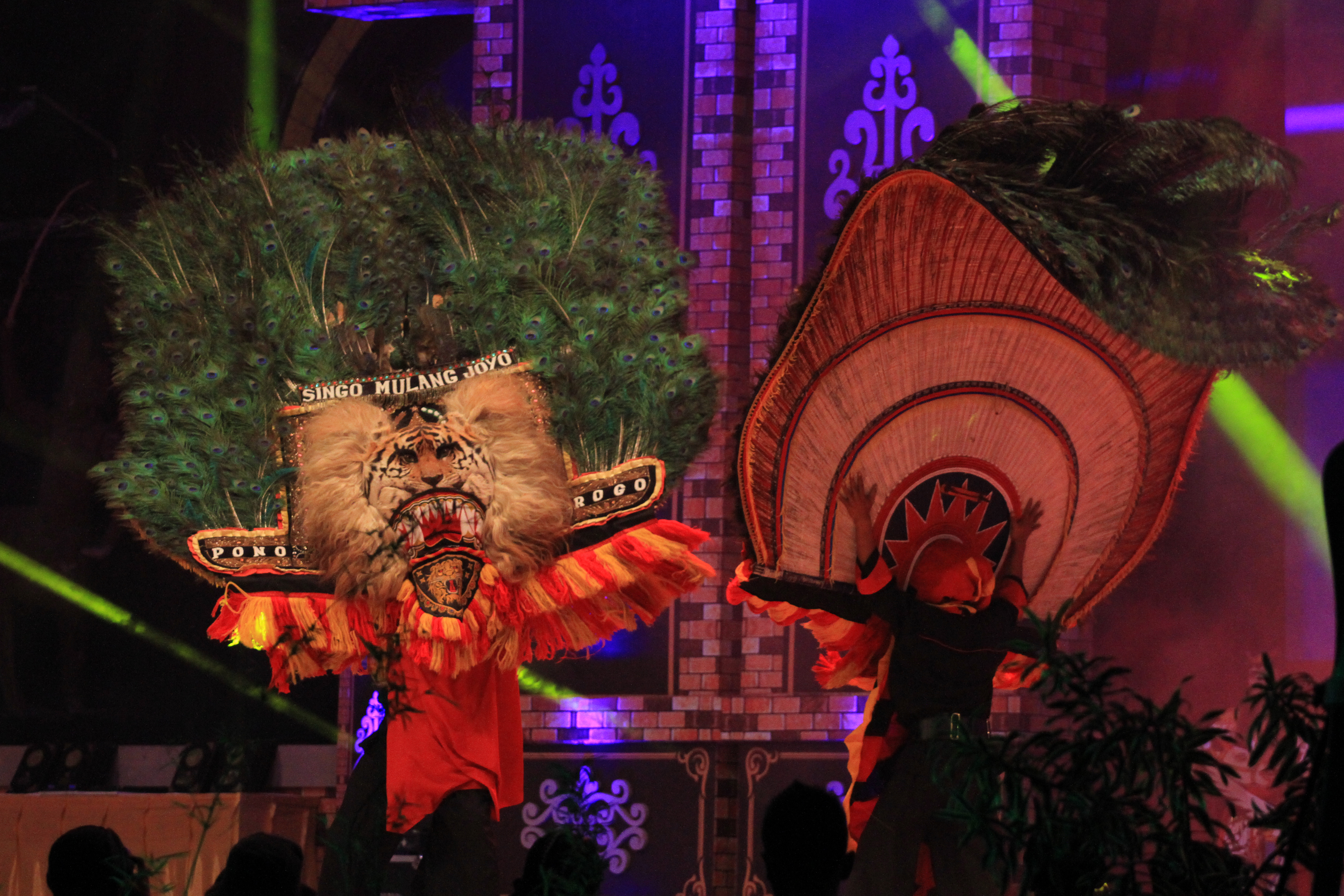
Singo Barong performance at Festival Reog Nasional in Ponorogo, East Java, Indonesia

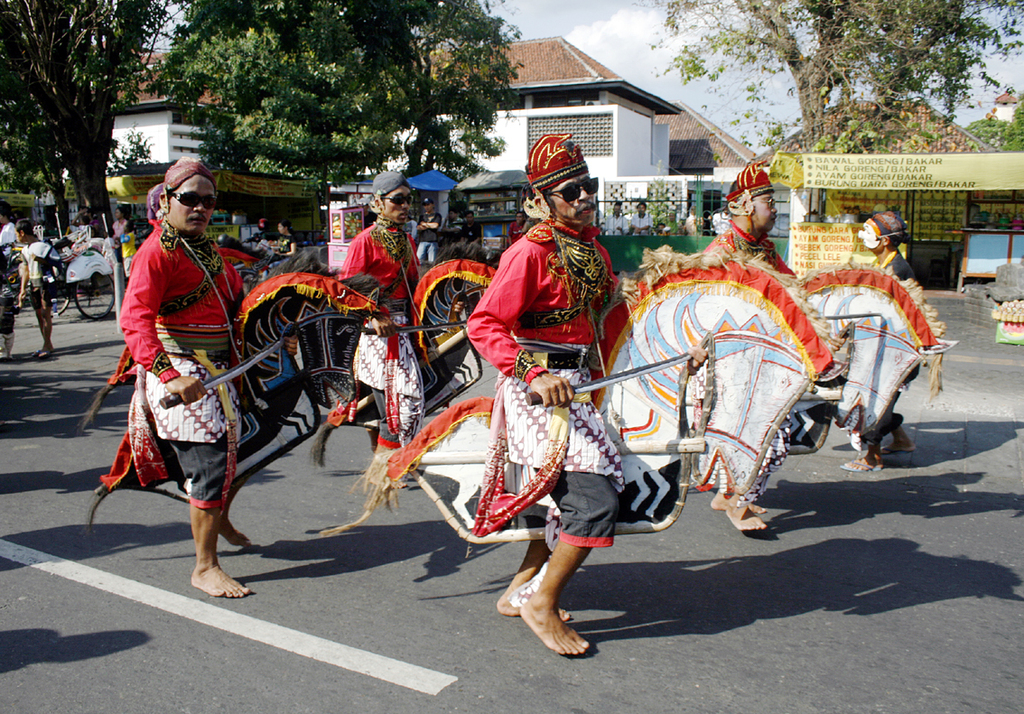
Kuda Lumping also called "Jaran Kepang", is a traditional Javanese dance depicting a group of troops riding horses.

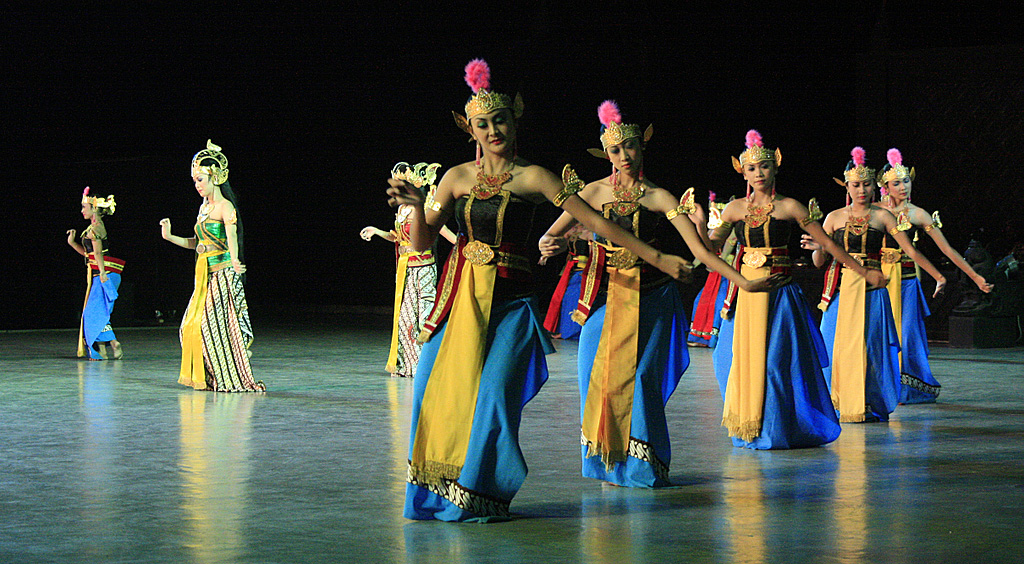
Shinta in Javanese Ramayana Wayang Wong dance performance, Prambanan.

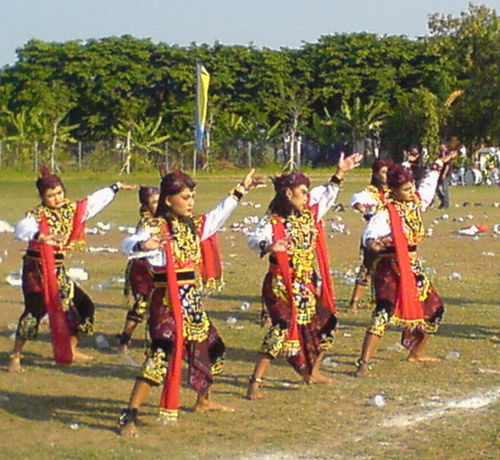
Remo dance

== Gallery ==
Some examples of Indonesian Traditional dance

Beksan Nir Corona, a dance about COVID-19 prevention performed at Kraton Ngayogyakarta

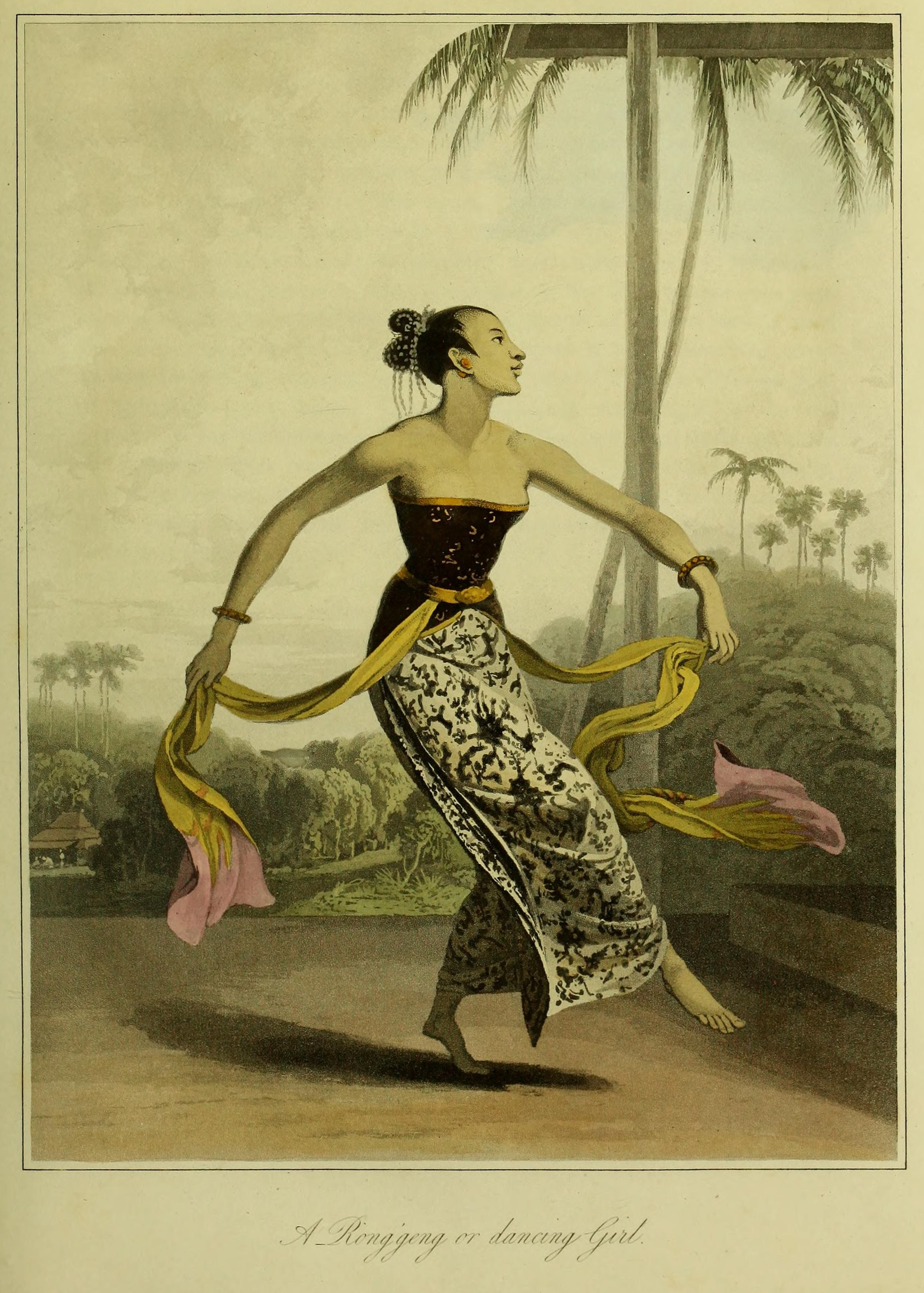
Ronggeng dance

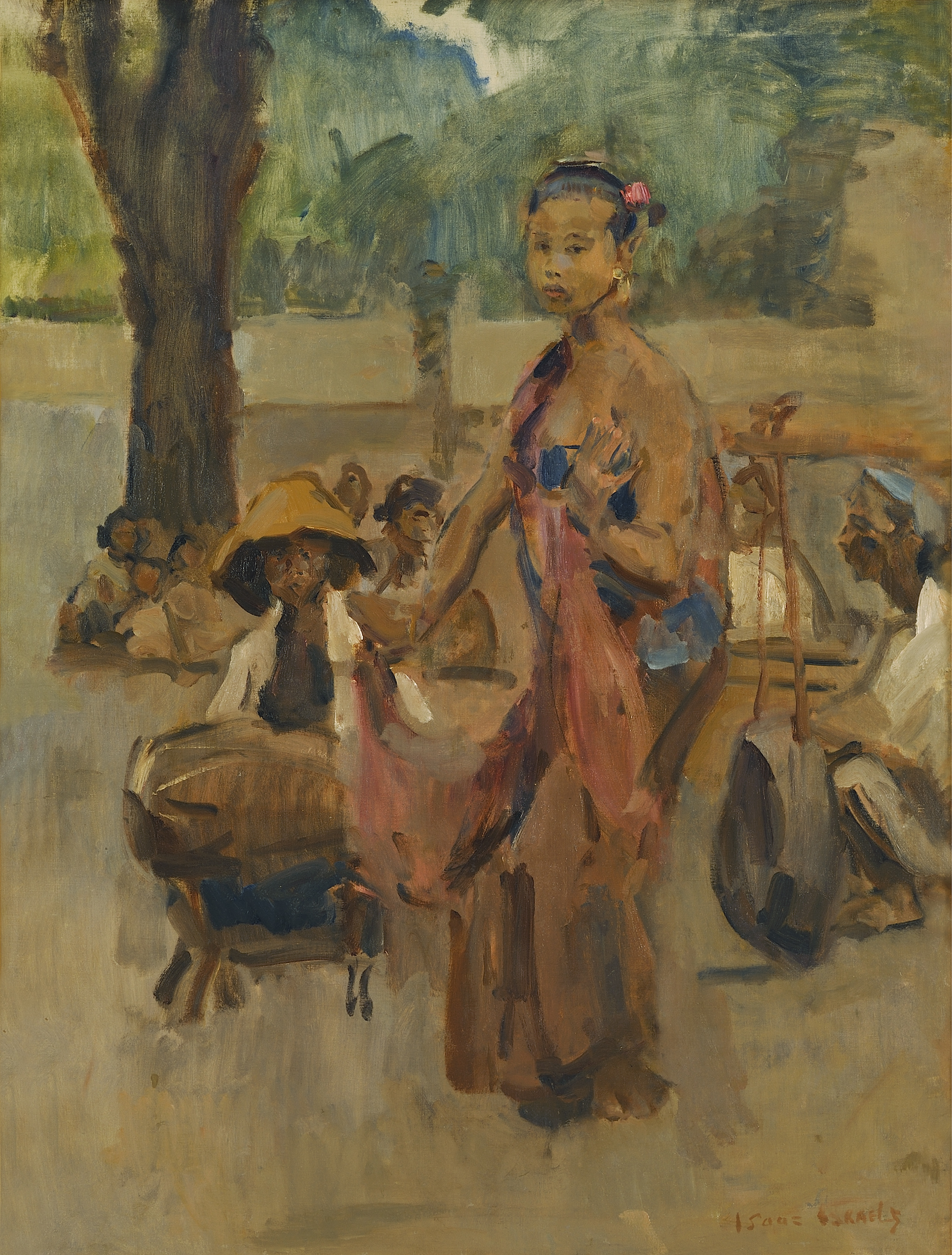
Painting of Javanese dance

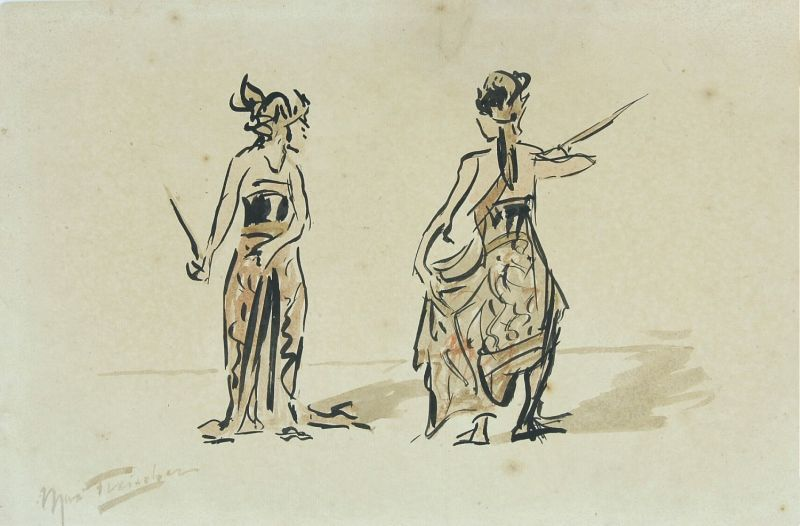
Painting of Javanese dance

== See also ==
- Dance of Indonesia
- Balinese dance
- Sundanese dance
- Dance of Cambodia
- Dance of Thailand
