= Srimpi =

Indonesian traditional dance

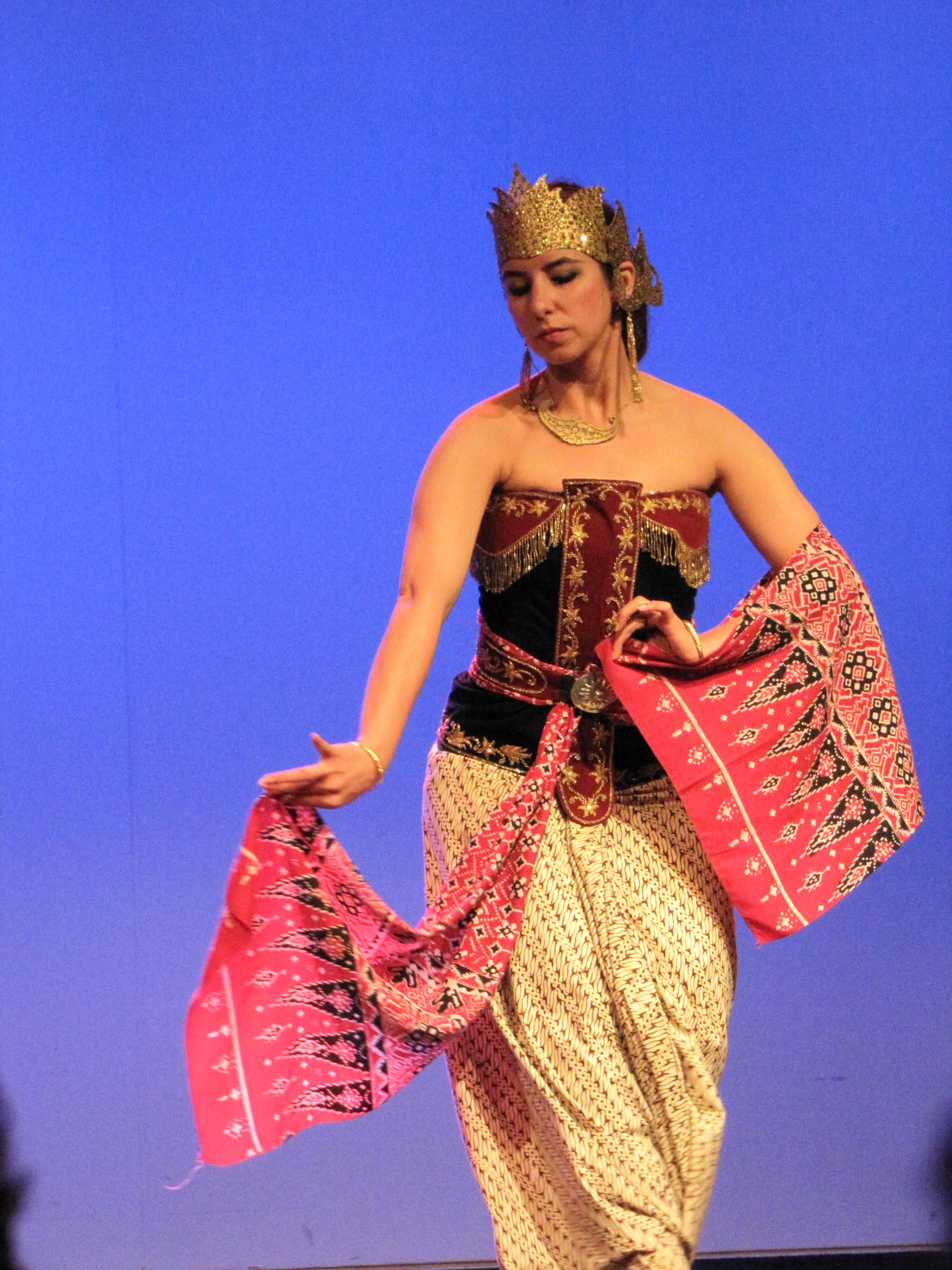
- The elegant dance of Srimpi.
- Native name: ꦱꦿꦶꦩ꧀ꦥꦶ (Javanese); Tari Srimpi (Indonesian)
- Genre: Traditional dance
- Instrument: Gamelan
- Inventor: Javanese
- Origin: Indonesia

The Srimpi (Javanese: ꦱꦿꦶꦩ꧀ꦥꦶ, romanized: Srimpi) (also written as Serimpi) is a ritualised dance of Java, Indonesia, associated with the royal palaces of Yogyakarta and Surakarta. The srimpi dance is one of the classical dances of Central Java. Along with the bedhaya, srimpi epitomised the elegant (Javanese: alus) character of the royal Javanese court, becoming a symbol of the ruler's power as well as the refinement of Javanese culture.

== Form and movement ==
The srimpi dance is usually performed by four female dancers, but other numbers such as two, six or eight dancers are also possible, depending on the type of srimpi being performed. Similarity in looks, heights, and body types among dancers is preferred to achieve better aesthetics. Srimpi demonstrates soft, slow, and graceful movements, highly stylised hand positions, stances, and body poses, coupled with the shoulder-baring kemben outfit, to describe elegance, modesty, refinement, beauty and grace. The dancer moves slowly accompanied with serene gamelan music.

The srimpi dances, being less sacred in nature than bedhaya, are much better known and often performed, not only in the two Keratons, but also outside the courts for ceremonies and festivals of common Javanese people. Up until today, the srimpi dances are still a part of court ceremonies, as princesses routinely rehearse various types of srimpi in the pendopo pavilion within the palace.

== Gallery ==
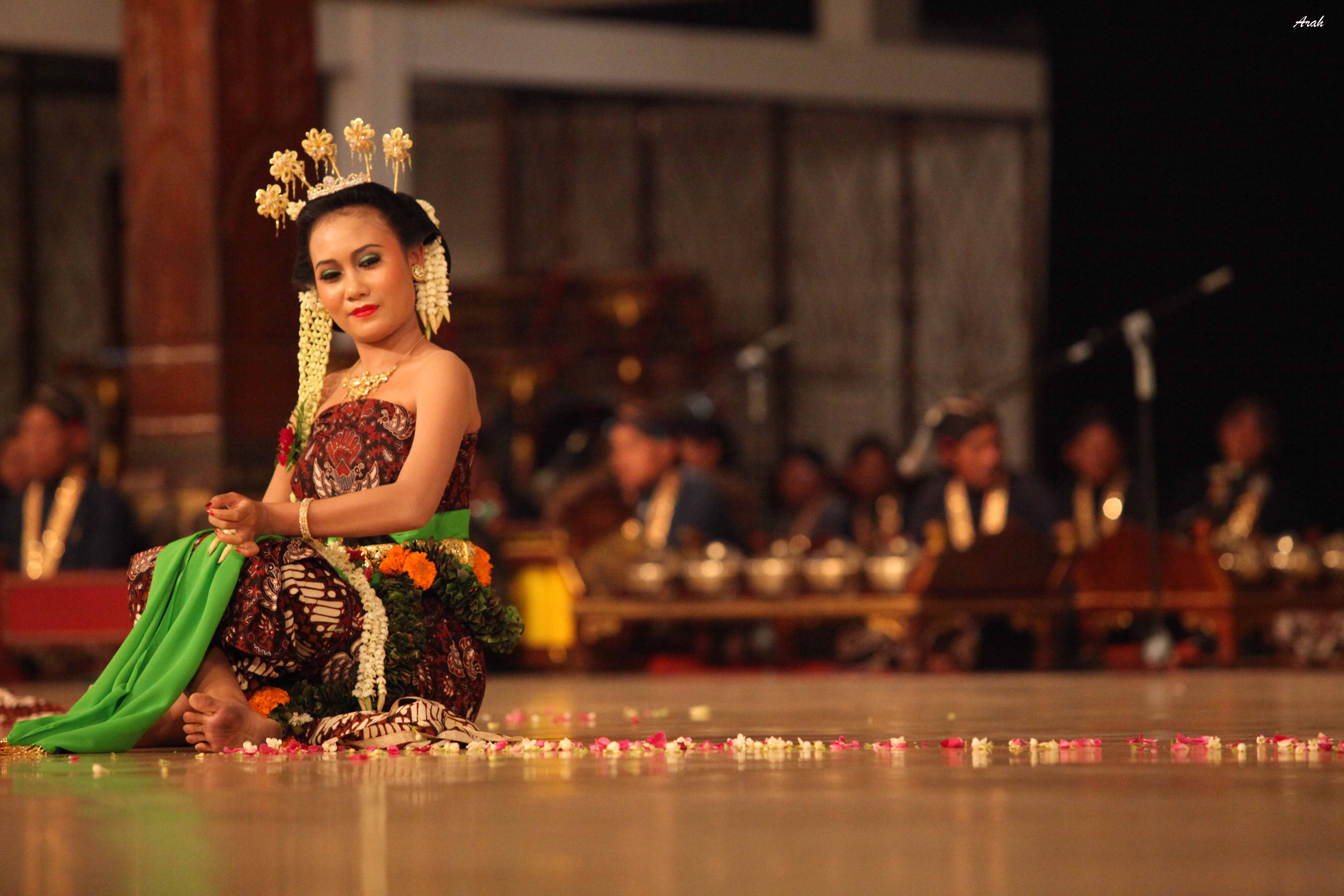
A srimpi dhempel dance performance, choreography by King Pakubuwono VII of Surakarta

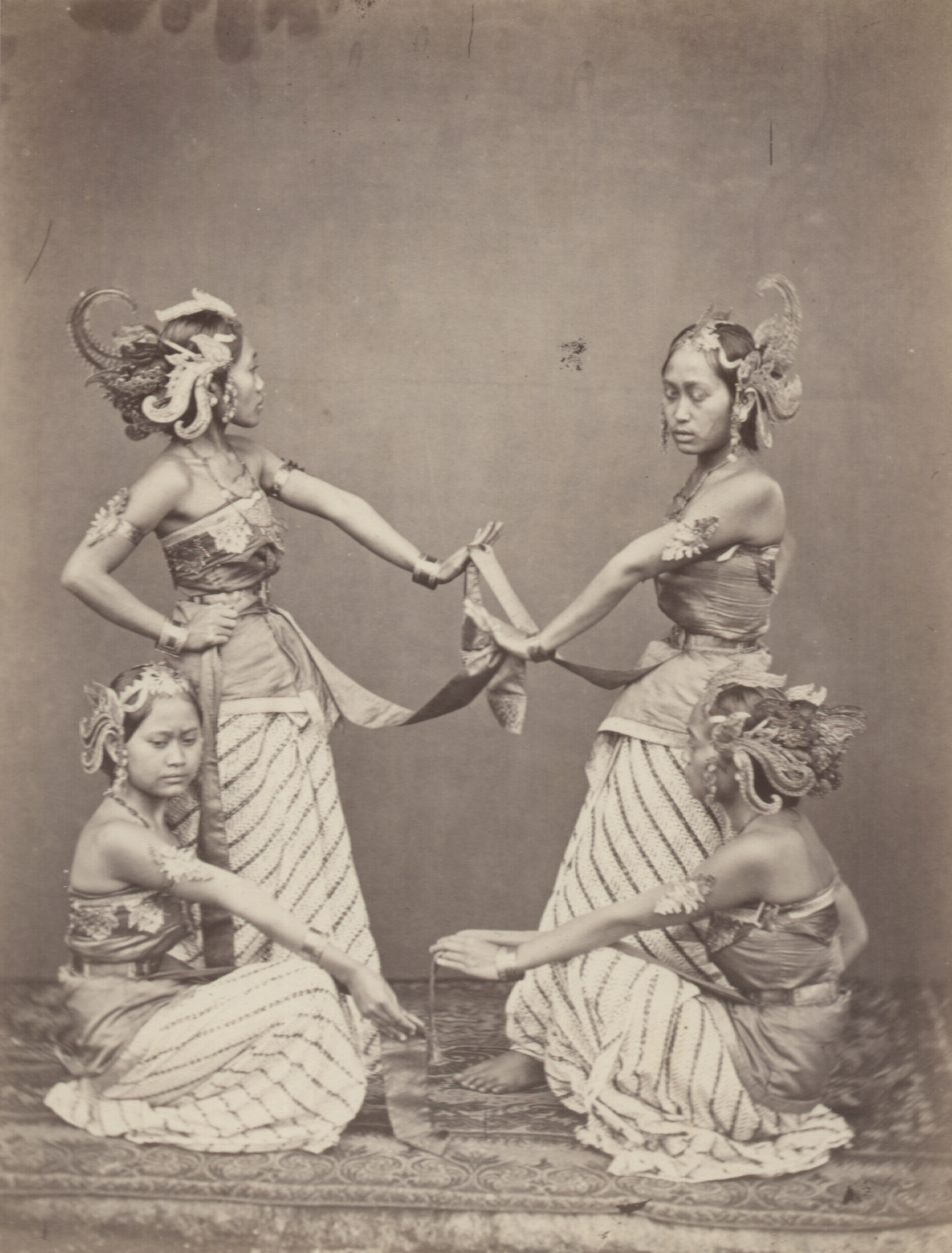
Srimpi dancers of the Regent of Bandung (circa 1864)

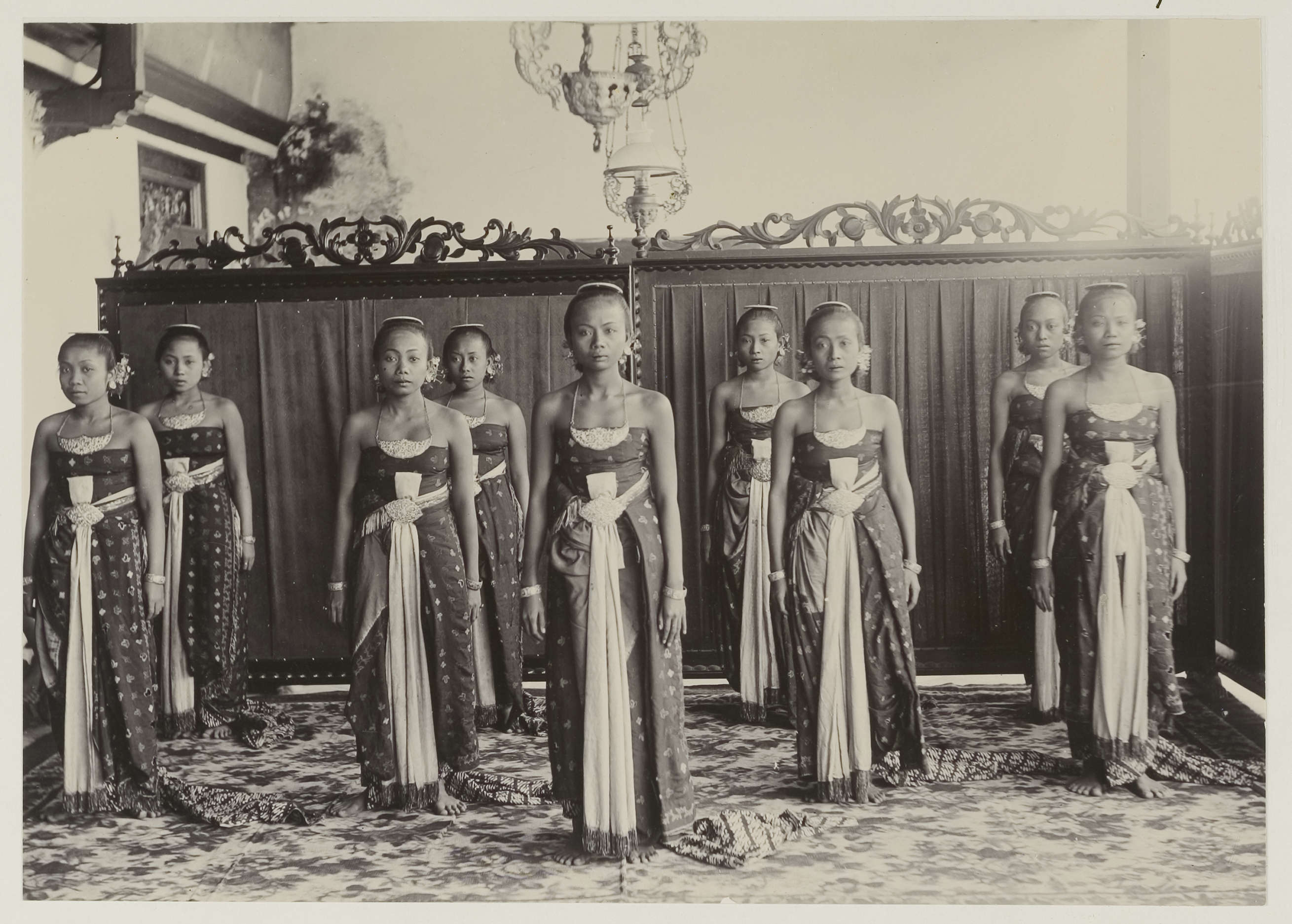
Srimpi dancers in traditional costume in 1900

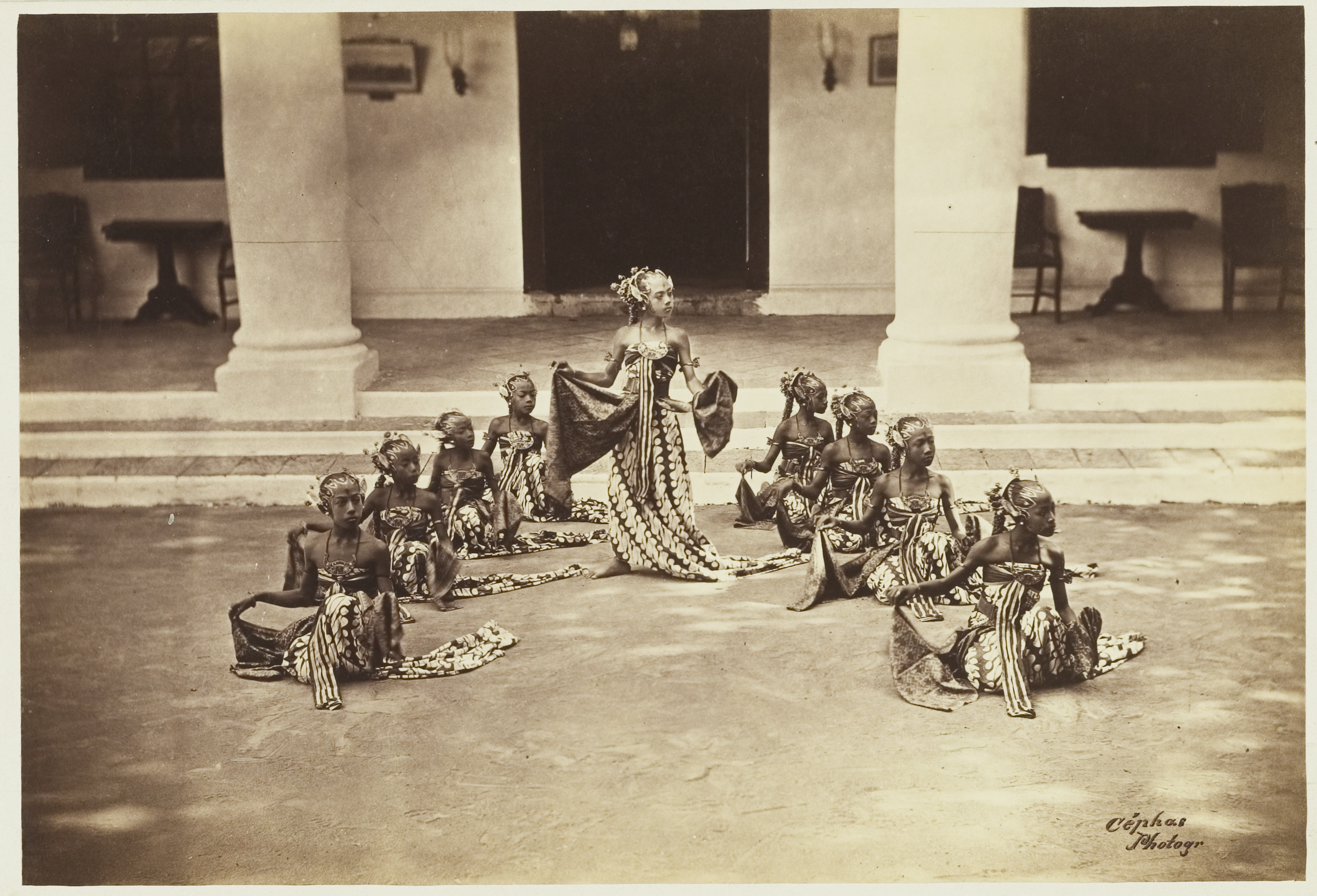
A srimpi performance at Yogyakarta Palace in 1885

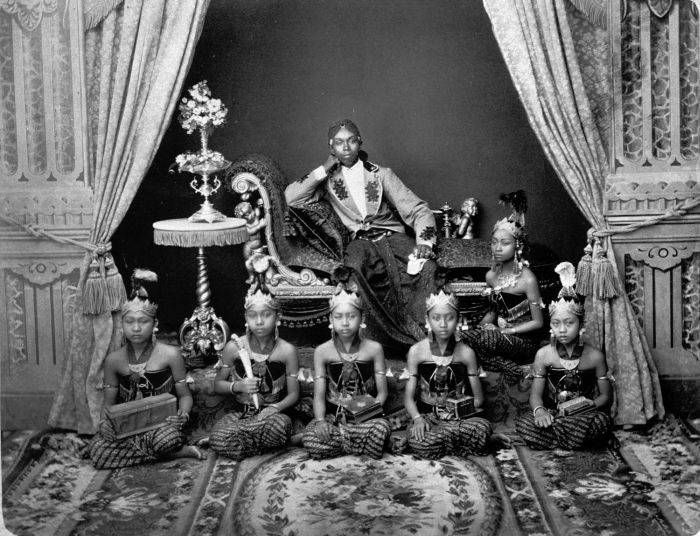
Prince of Mangkunegaran with srimpi dancers in 1885

== See also ==
- Bedhaya
- Javanese dance
- Javanese culture
- Baksa kembang
- Kejawèn
