= Ramayana Ballet =

Visualization and representation of the epic Ramayana saga

Ramayana ballet
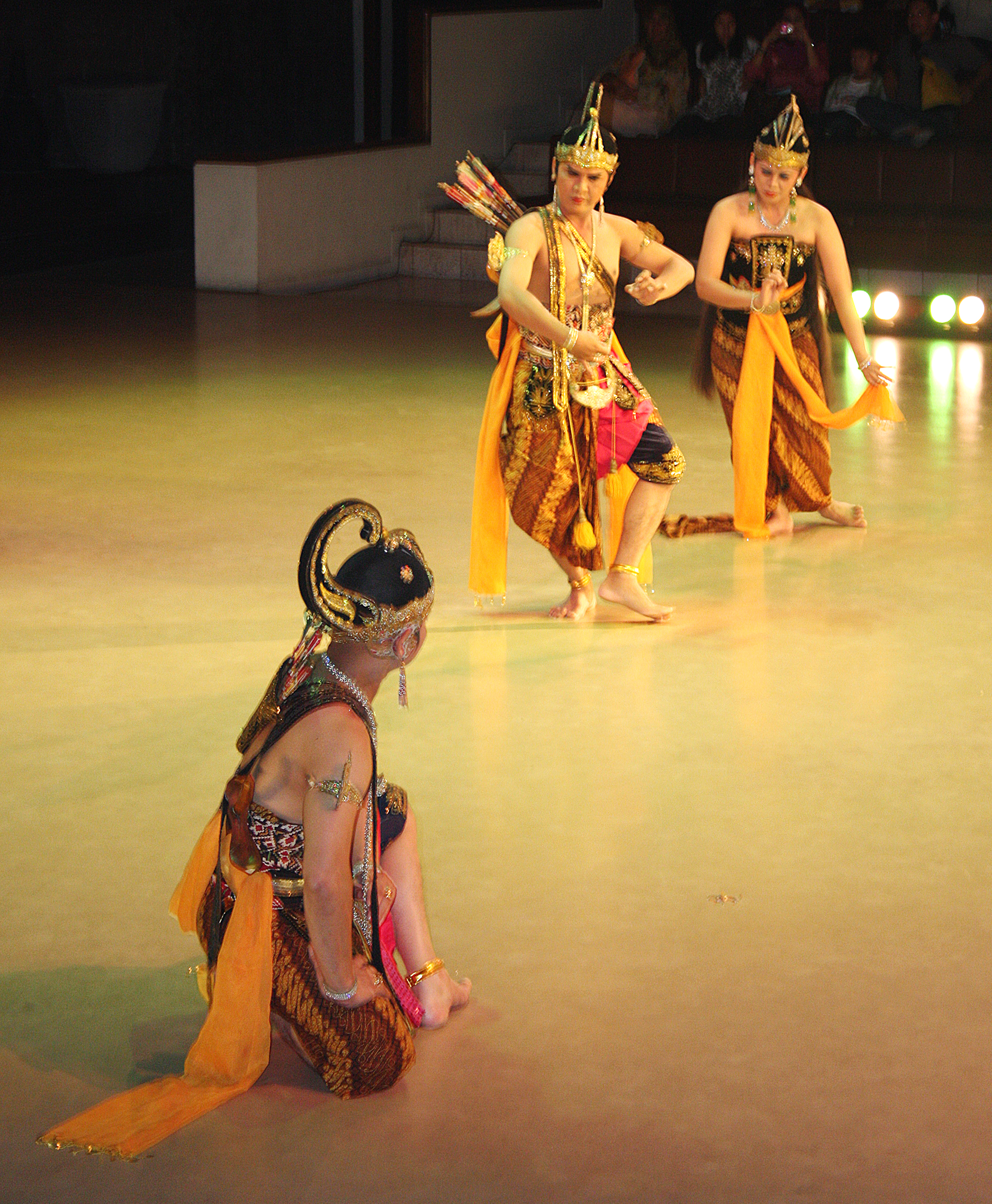
- Javanese Ramayana Ballet in Prambanan temple
- Origin: Indonesia

The Ramayana Ballet (Indonesian: Sendratari Ramayana) is a visualization and representation of the epic Ramayana saga, originally written by Valmiki in the Sanskrit language, in a highly stylized dance artform. Ramayana Ballet performance combines music, dance and drama. It is usually performed without dialogue.

Originated in India, Ramayana has become a fertile source of artistic inspirations, especially in Southeast Asian nations that have traditionally been greatly influenced by dharmic civilization. Ramayana ballet or dance drama can be found in several traditions in Asia, namely as Sendratari Ramayana in Indonesia (Java and Bali), Ramakien dance in Thailand, and Reamker dance in Cambodia.

== Performance ==
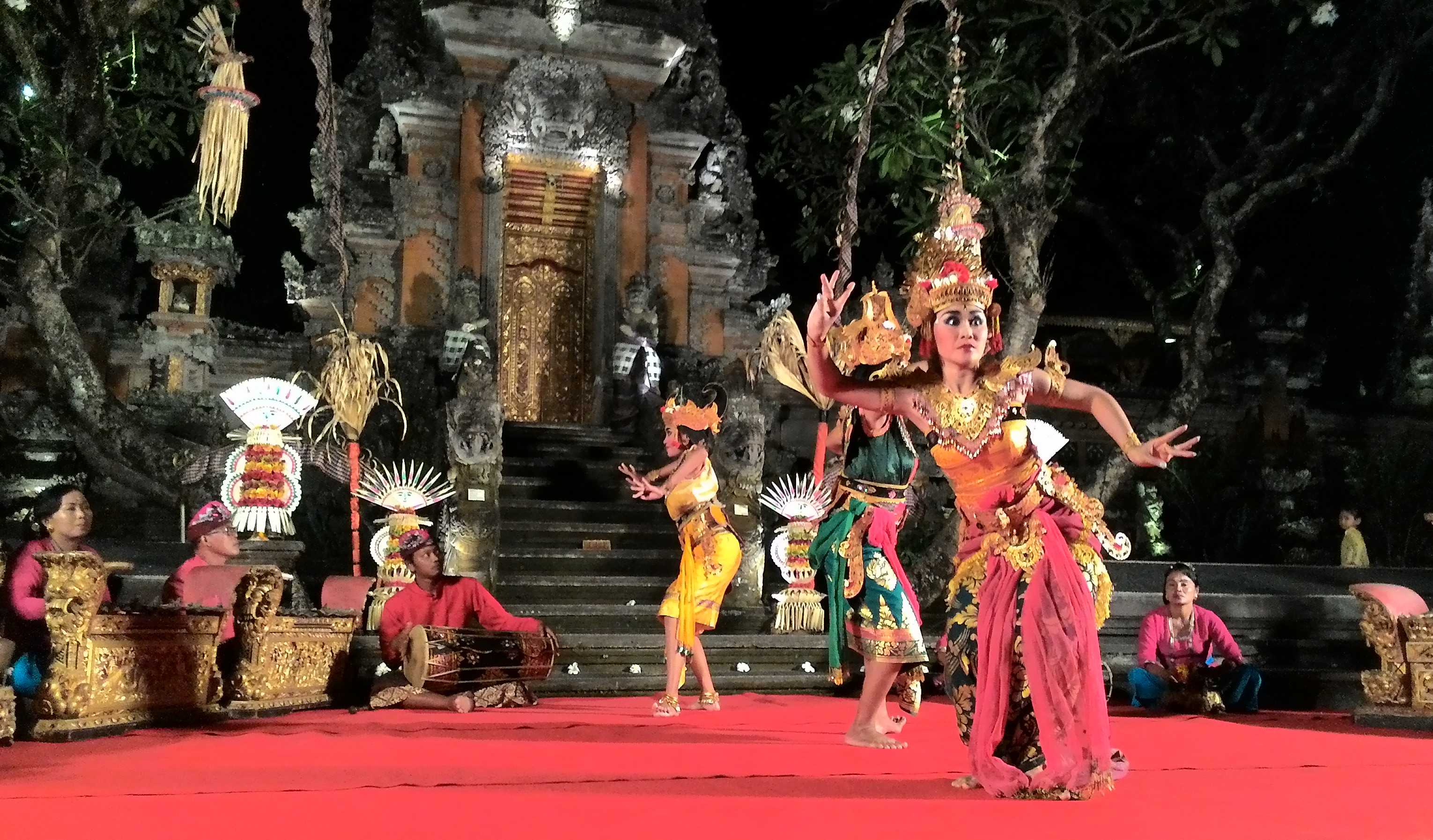
Balinese Ramayana dance drama, performed in Sarasvati Garden in Ubud.

In Indonesia, Ramayana mainly can be found in two major dance traditions; the Javanese and Balinese traditions, presented as a complete set of performing art including dance drama and intricate gamelan orchestra.

In Java, Ramayana ballet is part of Javanese Wayang Wong tradition, as the performance combines traditional Javanese dance, drama, and music. In Java, Indonesia, Ramayana ballet regularly performed in many places, such as: at the Hindu temple Prambanan, also known as Prambanan Ramayana Ballet; Purawisata Ramayana Ballet, at Yogyakarta Purawisata cultural center; and Hyatt Regency Yogyakarta Hotel.

In Bali, Ramayana ballet is performed in two forms, as stylized sendratari (lit. ballet) as those performed in Ubud, or as part of Kecak dance as those performed in Uluwatu temple.

== See also ==
- Wayang wong
- Kecak
- Kakawin Ramayana
- Versions of the Ramayana
