= Xenophobia and racism in the Middle East =

The article describes the state of race relations and racism in the Middle East. Racism is widely condemned throughout the world, with 182 states parties to the International Convention on the Elimination of All Forms of Racial Discrimination by 2nd Oct 2019. In different countries, the forms that racism takes may be different for historic, cultural, religious, economic or demographic reasons.

== Bahrain ==
Despite making up the majority of the population, Shia Muslims in Bahrain have faced severe persecution. The situation of Shia Muslims has been compared to apartheid.

== Iran ==
According to article 19 of the Iranian constitution: "All people of Iran, whatever the ethnic group or tribe to which they belong, enjoy equal rights; and color, race, language, and the like, do not bestow any privilege". Iran is a signatory to the International Convention on the Elimination of All Forms of Racial Discrimination. Despite this, racism towards Afghans, particularity ethnic Hazara immigrants, is common in Iran. There is also socio-political and economic discrimination faced by the Kurdish populations in Iran. A 2019 UN anti-racism panel found the Islamic Republic of Iran discriminating against Arabs, Kurds, and other ethnic minorities.

== Iraq ==
During World War II, Rashid Ali al-Kaylani blamed British hostility toward his pro-Nazi stance on the Iraqi Jewish community. In 1941, Iraqi nationalists murdered 200 Jews in Baghdad in a pogrom. After the 1948 Arab–Israeli War, Iraqi Jews faced persecution so great that by 1951, approximately 100,000 of them left the country while the Iraqi rulers confiscated their property and financial assets. During 1987–1988, Iraqi forces carried out a genocide against the Iraqi Kurds that claimed the lives of hundreds of thousands of people. The UN reports that although Christians comprise less than 5% of Iraq's population, they make up nearly 40% of the refugees fleeing Iraq. More than 50% of Iraqi Christians have already left the country since 2003. Iraq's Christian community numbered 1.4 million in the early 1980s at the start of Iran–Iraq War. But as the 2003 invasion has radicalized Islamic sensibilities, Christians' total numbers slumped to about 500,000 by 2006, of whom 250,000 live in Baghdad. Furthermore, the Mandaean and Yazidi communities are at the risk of elimination due to ethnic cleansing by Islamic extremists. A May 25, 2007 article notes that in the previous seven months only 69 people from Iraq had been granted refugee status in the United States.

== Israel ==
On 22 February 2007, the United Nations Committee on the Elimination of Racial Discrimination will consider the report submitted by Israel under Article 9 of the International Convention on the Elimination of all Forms of Racial Discrimination. The report states that "Racial discrimination is prohibited in Israel. The State of Israel condemns all forms of racial discrimination, and its government has maintained a consistent policy prohibiting such discrimination". Caputi, this report was challenged by several reports submitted to the committee by numerous human rights organizations and Arab States. Adalah (The Legal Center for Palestinian Rights in Israel), a Palestinian advocacy group, has alleged that "the State of Israel pursues discriminatory land and housing policies against Palestinian citizens of Israel" and that "the needs of Palestinian citizens of Israel are systematically disregarded". Throughout Jewish Israeli Society, and particularly among the youth, anti-Palestinian and Jewish supremacist sentiment has spiked, manifesting itself in the form of rising hate crimes, public opinion polls, and hateful comments from high-profile Knesset members. The newspaper Haaretz has prominently written "Let's face it: Israel has a racism problem".

== Jordan ==
Racism is sometimes manifested in football where some people in the audience cause factious affairs since Jordanians usually support Al Faisaly football club and Palestinians support Al Wehdat. According to Freedom House 2024 report Syrian refugees in Jordan continued to face discrimination. Separately, workplace discrimination affects Christian men in Jordan, especially those from a Muslim background.

== Lebanon ==
Lebanon has been accused of practicing apartheid against Palestinian residents. According to Human Rights Watch, "In 2001, Parliament passed a law prohibiting Palestinians from owning property, a right they had for decades. Lebanese law also restricts their ability to work in many areas. In 2006, Lebanon eliminated a ban on Palestinians holding most clerical and technical positions, provided they obtain a temporary work permit from the Labor Ministry, but more than 20 high-level professions remain off-limits to Palestinians. Few Palestinians have benefited from the 2005 reform, though. In 2009, only 261 of more than 145,679 permits issued to non-Lebanese were for Palestinians. Civil society groups say many Palestinians choose not to apply because they cannot afford the fees and see no reason to pay a portion of their salary toward the National Social Security Fund, since Lebanese law bars Palestinians from receiving social security benefits."

In 2012 and 2013, Lebanese authorities carried out mass arrests in diverse, working-class neighborhoods of Beirut, reflecting a broader climate of growing xenophobia, racism, and class-based discrimination in Lebanese society, particularly towards minorities. These raids disproportionately targeted migrant workers, refugees, and displaced individuals, who often face systemic vulnerabilities within the legal system, while also facing higher risks of arbitrary detention and mistreatment by Lebanese authorities while in custody.

In 2010, Palestinians were granted the same rights to work as other foreigners in the country.

== Oman ==
Omani society is largely tribal. Oman has three known types of identities. Two of these identities are "tribalism and Ibadism", the third identity is linked to "maritime trade". The first two identities are widespread in the interior of Oman, these identities are closely tried to tradition, as a result of lengthy periods of isolation. The third identity, which pertains to Muscat and the coastal areas of Oman, is an identity that has become embodied in business and trade. Consequently, the third identity is generally seen to be more open and tolerant towards others. Thus, tension between socio-cultural groups in Omani society exists. More importantly, is the existence of social inequality between these three groups. According to the CIA, Oman's population primarily consists of Arab, Baluchi, South Asian (Indian, Pakistani, Sri Lankan, Bangladeshi), and African ethnic groups. The descendants of servant tribes and slaves are victims of widespread discrimination. Omanis of slave origin are sometimes referred to as "khaddam" (servant) and some are subservient to previous masters, despite legal emancipation. Oman was one of the last nations on earth to abolish slavery in 1970. It is believed that migrant workers in Oman are treated better than in other Arab states of the Persian Gulf. The plight of domestic workers in Oman is a taboo subject. Every six days, an Indian migrant in Oman commits suicide. There has been a campaign urging authorities to check the migrant suicide rate.

== Palestine ==
Various Palestinian organizations and individuals have been regularly accused of being antisemitic. Howard Gutman believes that much of Muslim hatred of Jews stems from the ongoing Arab–Israeli conflict and that peace would significantly reduce anti-semitism.

== Qatar ==
Citizens in Qatar discriminate against migrant workers even though they make up most of the population. The backlash comes from the working conditions that they put their migrant workers through. These workers are usually placed in dangerous work zones that they have no choice but to stick by as there are no other jobs available. The instances that happened in the World Cup 2022 are an example.

Domestic workers are a large target of racism in Qatar due to it happening behind closed doors. These workers are subjected to mental abuse and some were also subjected to physical abuse such as rape. Domestic workers are often unable to escape due to the working conditions they are facing. Many, work without getting any kind of pay. Their lack of money makes them unable to return home and impacts their families as most of them rely on the worker's income.

== Saudi Arabia ==
Racism in Saudi Arabia against labor workers who are foreigners, mostly from developing countries. Asian maids have been persecuted victims of racism and discrimination in the country, foreign workers have been exploited, under- or unpaid, physically abused, overworked and locked in their places of employment. The international organisation Human Rights Watch (HRW) describes these conditions as "near-slavery" and attributes them to "deeply rooted gender, religious, and racial discrimination". In many cases the workers are unwilling to report their employers for fear of losing their jobs or further abuse.

There were several cases of antisemitism in Saudi Arabia and is common within religious circles. Saudi Arabian media often attacks Jews in books, news articles, at their Mosques and with what some describe as antisemitic satire. Saudi Arabian government officials and state religious leaders often promote the idea that Jews are conspiring to take over the entire world; as proof of their claims they publish and frequently cite The Protocols of the Elders of Zion as factual.

== Turkey ==
In recent years, racism in Turkey has increased towards Middle Eastern nationals such as Syrian refugees, Afghan, Pakistani, and African migrants. A 2024 report by the Minority Rights Group International (a NGO which has a consultative status with the United Nations Economic and Social Council) revealed that discrimination against minorities has been persistent in Turkey.Discrimination impacted especially the two largest minorities in Turkey: the Alevis, who suffer from bureaucratic obstacles and security concerns, and the Kurds who suffer from challenges in political participation and representation. The Stockholm Center for Freedom mentioned in 2025 that discrimination and violence continued to affect minority groups, refugees and migrants in Turkey from Syria, Iran, Guinea, as well as Uyghurs.

== See also ==
- Anti-Arabism
- Anti-Afghan sentiment
- Anti–Middle Eastern sentiment
- Antisemitism in the Arab world
- Antisemitism in Islam
- Geography of antisemitism
- Islamophobia
- Persecution of Muslims
- Racism by country
- Racism in Africa
- Racism in the Arab world
- Racism in Asia
- Racism in Muslim communities
