= Racism in the Arab world =

In the Arab world, racism targets black Arabs, and non-Arab ethnic minorities such as sub-Saharan Africans, Berbers, the Saqaliba, Southeast Asians, Druze, Jews, Kurds, Copts, Assyrians, Persians, and South Asians living in Arab countries of the Middle East. Arab racism also targets the expat majority of the Arab states of the Persian Gulf coming from South Asian (Sri Lanka, Pakistan, India, and Bangladesh) groups as well as Black, European, and Asian groups that are Muslim.

Racism in the Arab world has been linked to notions of Arab supremacy, manifesting in various forms of discrimination against non-Arab communities. Historically, this has included the marginalization of groups such as the Berbers in North Africa, Kurds in the Middle East, and Black Africans, like Masalit and Dinka in countries, like Sudan.

The previously taboo topics of race and racism in the Arab world have been explored more since the rise of foreign, private, and independent media. In one example, Al-Jazeera's critical coverage of the Darfur crisis led to the arrest and conviction of its Khartoum bureau chief. The Darfur conflict has been characterized by racially motivated violence, with reports indicating that Arab militias, such as Janjaweed, targeted non-Arab ethnic groups, leading to allegations of ethnic cleansing and genocide.

== History ==
Medieval Arab attitudes to Black people varied over time and individual attitude, but tended to be negative. Though the Qur'an expresses no racial prejudice, ethnocentric prejudice towards black people is widely evident among medieval Arabs, for a variety of reasons: their extensive conquests and slave trade; the influence of Aristotelian ideas regarding slavery, which some Muslim philosophers directed towards Zanj and the influence of Judeo-Christian ideas regarding divisions among humankind. On the other hand, the Afro-Arab author Al-Jahiz, himself having a Zanj grandfather, wrote a book entitled Superiority of the Blacks to the Whites, and explained why the Zanj were black in terms of environmental determinism in the "On the Zanj" chapter of The Essays. By the 14th century, a significant number of slaves came from either West or Central Africa; Lewis argues that this led to the likes of Egyptian historian Al-Abshibi (1388–1446) writing that "[i]t is said that when the [black] slave is sated, he fornicates, when he is hungry, he steals."

Some charge that "ultra-Arabism and Jihadism have been responsible for widespread persecution and genocide." such Saddam's using chemical weapons and gas against the Kurds during the bombings of Halabja in northern Iraq. "The Kurds, a non-Arab people whose language belongs to the Iranian group, have suffered from persecution under the Baath of Iraq and Syria, especially since the departure of British and French forces in the late 1940s." (Kurds are also claiming rights in Iran and Turkey.) The Berbers, the pre-Arab native peoples of North Africa, have been victimized by the Arabs in North Africa.

There are historic racial divisions, racial and religious prejudices in Iraq, including on Kurds, on Shia and the Marsh Arabs.

Author draws parallel between Arab nationalism and Turkish nationalism, both were "likewise evolving into the "racial" stage, the ideal being a great "Pan-Arab" empire, embracing not merely the ethnically Arab peninsula-homeland, but also the regions of Mesopotamia, The Levant, Egypt, Tripoli, North Africa and the Sudan."

A writer on the Durban conference regarding racism suggests: That stressing out that "Arabism is racism" would have been an interesting debating topic. Yet, he adds that "the OIC countries were very clever in how they deflected the slavery issue that could so easily have been turned on them with a vengeance."

Some Muslim activists have also expressed that "Arabism is racism, pure and simple." There was Sheikh Mustafa al-Maraghi, who in a famous 1938 essay dismissed the goal of [pan] Arab unity as racist.

Arab Muslim authors in "Arab-Iranian relations":

Much ink has flowed on the issue of Arab nationalism. Some people believe it to be a racist movement, advocating the superiority of the Arabs.

Ali A. Allawi, the former Iraqi Minister of Defense and Finance, envisioning a peaceful Iraq: "Arabism, racism and sectarianism – would be dethroned. Iraq would be at peace with itself and with its region."

In 1960's, the French Comite d' Action de Defense De- mocratique published a pamphlet titled Racism and Pan-Arabism, its introduction followed by an article by the well known French sociologist, anthropologist & political leader: Jackes Soustelle to fight against all kinds of racism, this was followed by a paper by Shlomo Friedrich on "Pan-Arabism: A New Racist Menace?" who offered a sharp critique of Nasser's book The Philosophy of the Revolution, and it terms it a mere pale imitation of Hitler's Mein Kampf.

=== Ethnocentrism ===
According to Dr. Michael Penn:

Contrary to many present-day stereotypes of early Islam, throughout much of the seventh and early eighth centuries, admission into the umma was reserved exclusively for Arabs. Religious conversion was predicated on ethnic conversion. For a non-Arab to become Muslim, that individual first had to gain membership in an Arab tribe by becoming the mawlā (client) of an Arab sponsor. From a seventh-century Islamic perspective, ethnicity and religion were not independent variables. All Muslims were Arabs, and ideally all Arabs were Muslims.

== Forms ==
Some of the persecuted victims of racism and discrimination in the Arab world include: Sub-Saharan Africans in Egypt, including on Eritreans, and oppressing Darfurian refugees, Algeria, Mauritania – fighting off racist policies in these countries, in Iraq where blacks face racism, Kurds in Syria and in Iraq, Copts, it worsened with the empowerment of the Muslim Brotherhood in Egypt Al-Akhdam in Yemen, as well as slaves who fight the stigma of their status as 'slaves' in impoverished Yemen, Persians' historic struggle against the 'Arab supremacy,' Berbers in North Africa (Morocco, Algeria, Tunisia, Libya ), South Asians and Southeast Asians (migrant workers and maids in the Gulf Arab nations), Jews (see: Antisemitism in the Arab world, in a 2009 PEW poll, 90% of the Middle East were found to view Jews unfavorably). Although slavery was officially abolished in 1981, a 2012 CNN report suggested that 10% to 20% of the Mauritanian population was enslaved with a correlation with skin color – darker-skinned Mauritanians were often enslaved by lighter-skinned.

=== Anti-Black racism ===
Anti-Black racism in the Arab world refers to prejudice and discrimination against Black people in Arab societies. It affects both Black citizens of Arab countries and migrants from sub-Saharan Africa, and has been documented in employment, education, public life, migration, and popular media. It can include racial slurs, social exclusion, segregation, and stereotyped portrayals such as blackface.

The history of anti-Black racism in the region has been associated with slavery and the trans-Saharan, Red Sea, and Indian Ocean slave trades, although racial attitudes and identities have varied across periods and societies. In the modern Arab world, discrimination against Black people has been reported in countries including Tunisia, Libya, Egypt, Algeria, Mauritania, Iraq, Yemen, and Sudan. Some countries have adopted laws against racial discrimination, including Tunisia in 2018, but legal protections and public recognition of anti-Black racism vary across the region.

=== Anti-Kurdish racism ===
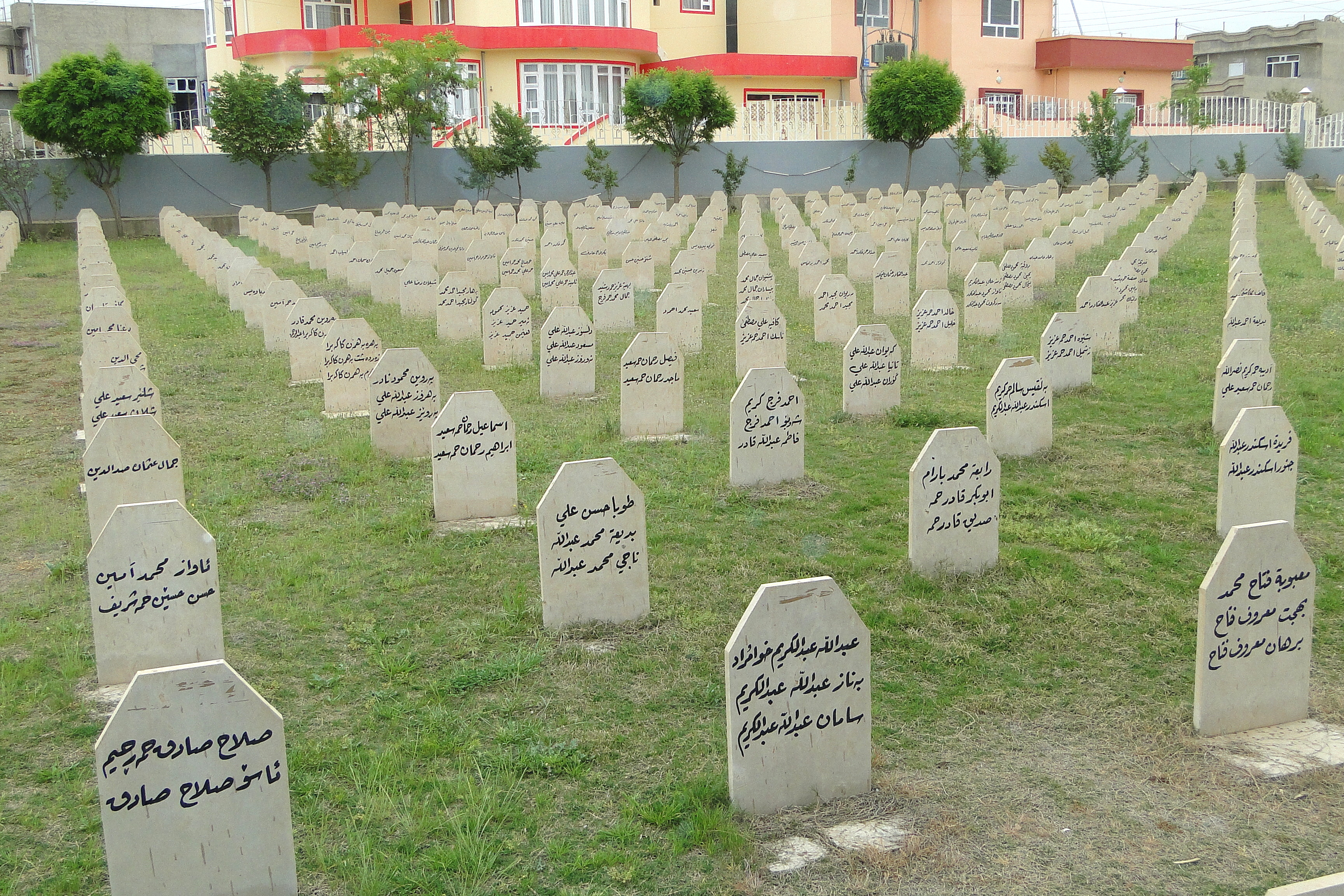
Cemetery of victims of the Halabja massacre

Anti-Kurdish sentiment, also known as anti-Kurdism or Kurdophobia, is hostility, fear, intolerance or racism against Kurds, Kurdistan, Kurdish culture, or Kurdish languages. A person who holds such positions is sometimes referred to as a Kurdophobe.

Gérard Chaliand coined the term to describe how Kurds have been oppressed. In Turkey, the government has historically denied Kurdish identity and language. In Syria and Iraq, similar anti-Kurdish policies have caused significant harm, including genocidal campaigns in Iraq under Saddam Hussein. Recently, conflicts like the fight against ISIS have increased awareness but also heightened anti-Kurdish actions and discrimination. Kurds there have been receiving death threats and demands for their expulsion.

=== Antisemitism ===
Antisemitism—prejudice against and hatred of Jews—has increased greatly in the Arab world since the beginning of the 20th century, with a variety of proposed explanations: the dissolution and breakdown of the Ottoman Empire and traditional Islamic society; European influence, brought about by Western imperialism and Arab Christians; Nazi propaganda and relations between Nazi Germany and the Arab world; resentment over Zionism and the experience of the Nakba; the rise of Arab nationalism; Quranic passages justifying hostile beliefs and treatment of Jews; and the widespread proliferation of anti-Jewish and anti-Zionist conspiracy theories.

Traditionally, Jews in the Muslim world were considered People of the Book (Arabic: أهل الكتاب, romanized: ahl al-kitāb) and were subjected to dhimmi (ذِمِّيّ, 'protected person'; Hebrew: ד׳ימי) status vis-à-vis the Quranic text itself, the Hadith, the Pact of Umar, and later works of Sharia. They were afforded relative security against persecution, provided they did not contest the varying inferior social and legal status imposed on them under Islamic rule.

While there were antisemitic incidents committed by Muslims before the 20th century, tensions surrounding Zionism and the escalating intercommunal conflict in Mandatory Palestine led to growing antisemitism in the Arab world. During the 1930s and the 1940s several Jewish communities in the Arab world suffered from pogroms, such as the Farhud. The status of Jews in Arab countries deteriorated further at the onset of the Arab–Israeli conflict, which began with the 1948 Arab–Israeli War, the forced expulsion of Palestinian Arabs, and the creation of the State of Israel. Israeli victories during the wars of 1956 and 1967 further increased tensions between Israel and its opponents—primarily Egypt, Syria, and Iraq. However, by the mid-1970s, a mass Jewish exodus from Arab and Muslim countries had occurred, with expelled Jews moving primarily to Israel, France, and the United States. The reason for the exodus is considered to be primarily due to prolonged violence against Jews.

By the 1980s, according to historian Bernard Lewis, the volume of antisemitic literature published in the Arab world, and the authority of its sponsors, seemed to suggest that classical antisemitism had become an essential part of Arab intellectual life, considerably more than in late 19th- and early 20th-century France and to a degree that has been compared to Nazi Germany. The rise of political Islam during the 1980s and afterwards provided a new mutation of Islamic antisemitism, giving Arab hatred of Jews a religious component.

In its 2008 report on contemporary Arab-Muslim antisemitism, the Israeli Intelligence and Terrorism Information Center dated the beginning of this phenomenon to the spread of classical medieval European, Christian antisemitism into the Arab world starting in the late 19th century. In 2014, the Anti-Defamation League published a global survey of worldwide antisemitic attitudes, reporting that in the Middle East, 74% of adults agreed with a majority of the survey's eleven antisemitic propositions, including that "Jews have too much power in international financial markets" and that "Jews are responsible for most of the world’s wars."

== Accusations against specific Arab governments ==
=== Iraq ===
According to a statement by Fred Halliday, the Ba'athists in Iraq were inspired by Sati' al-Husri and with rhetoric tinged with pan-Arabism and anti-Iranian sentiment. In the decade and a half after the Ba'ath party came to power, up to 200,000 Feyli Kurds were expelled from Iraq. In claiming to be "defenders of Arabism", Halliday asserts the Ba'ath promoted a myth of Persian migrants and communities in the Persian Gulf region to be comparable to "Zionists" settling Palestine.

=== Mauritania ===
According to Holly Burkhalter of Human Rights Watch, in a statement made in testimony before the Congress of the United States, "It is fair to say that the Mauritanian government practices undeclared apartheid and severely discriminates on the basis of race."

=== Sudan ===
Beginning in 1991, elders of the Zaghawa people of Sudan complained that they were victims of an intensifying Arab apartheid campaign. Vukoni Lupa Lasaga has accused the Sudanese government of "deftly manipulat(ing) Arab solidarity" to carry out policies of apartheid and ethnic cleansing against non-Arabs in Darfur. Alan Dershowitz has pointed to Sudan as an example of a government that deserves the appellation "apartheid", and former Canadian Minister of Justice Irwin Cotler has also criticized Sudan in similar terms.

=== Egypt ===
Black Egyptian President Anwar Sadat faced insults of not looking "Egyptian enough" and "Nasser's black poodle". An Egyptian Nubian soccer player Shikabala stopped playing football for some time due to racist slurs by rival Egyptian fans during a game. A group was shouting out "Shikabala" while pointing a black dog wearing the number 10, which was Zamalek football shirt. Mona Eltahawy, the Egyptian journalist, found a deep-seated anti-black racism in her country, mainly against Sudanese, Nubian or other darker-skinned people.

According to the Egyptian Initiative for Personal Rights (EIPR), Sub-Saharan immigrants to Egypt often face physical violence and verbal abuse at the hands of the general public and law enforcement officials. Refugees from Sudan are especially targeted, with racial slurs like "oonga boonga" and "samara" (meaning "black") constituting the most typical insults. The EIPR attributes the violence and abuse to both a lack of government efforts at disseminating information, raising awareness and dispelling myths with regard to the economic contributions made by the newcomers, and stereotyping on the part of the Egyptian media. Black women are also targets of sexual harassment. As a remedy, the EIPR recommends that the Egyptian government "should intensify and accelerate efforts to combat racist xenophobic views towards migrant workers, especially those of Sub-Saharan origin, and to promote awareness of their positive contribution to society. The government should train all personnel working in the field of criminal justice and law enforcement officials in the spirit of respect for human rights and non-discrimination on ethnic or racial grounds."

Many Egyptians distance themselves from African identity, aligning more with Arab and Middle Eastern identities. At the same time, Sub-Saharan Africans in Egypt report discrimination, and Egypt's internal groups (like Copts and secularists) use ancient heritage to resist Arab-Islamic associations.

=== Maghreb (Morocco, Tunisia, Algeria, Libya and Mauritania) ===
In March 2011, officials from the United Nations High Commissioner for Refugees confirmed allegations of discrimination by Tunisia against black Africans. Sub-Saharan Africans were reportedly targeted by rebel forces during the Libyan civil war in 2011.

Black and non-Arab migrants in Libya are reportedly more vulnerable to extortion and forced labor following the civil war. In 2025, Libyan authorities ordered 10 international organizations to suspend operations, accusing them of violating local laws by providing aid to African migrants.

== See also ==
- Anti-Black racism in the Arab world
- Antisemitism by country
- Antisemitism in the Arab world
- Antisemitism in Islam
- History of antisemitism
- History of the Jews under Muslim rule
- Islamic–Jewish relations
- Jewish exodus from the Muslim world
- Racism by country
- Racism in Africa
- Racism in Asia
- Racism in Mauritania
- Racism in Muslim communities
- Xenophobia and racism in the Middle East
