= Slavery in Latin America =

Slavery in Latin America was an economic and social institution that existed in Latin America before the colonial era until its legal abolition in the newly independent states during the 19th century. However, it continued illegally in some regions into the 20th century. Slavery in Latin America began in the pre-colonial period when indigenous civilizations, including the Maya and Aztec, enslaved captives taken in war. After the conquest of Latin America by the Spanish, Portuguese and French, in the period from the 1500s to the 1800s, merchants transported approximately 12 million Africans across the Atlantic as human property. The most common routes formed what is now known as the "Triangle Trade," connecting Europe, Africa, and the Americas. From 1560 to 1850, about 4.8 million enslaved people were transported to Brazil; 4.7 million were sent to the Caribbean; The European demand for African captives in mainland Spanish America (not including Spanish-Caribbean)began during the conquest and settlement of the New World. This labor demand quickly became a part of the global forced movement of captive Africans. During the colonial period, from the 1500s to the mid-19th century, over 12.5 million captives arrived in the Americas from Africa, primarily West Central Africa. For Mainland Spanish America (not including Spanish-Caribbean), approximately 2,072,300 people endured the transoceanic and intra-American slave trades and disembarked at Atlantic-facing ports in the mainland of this region, With Spanish Central America acquiring 1.3 million enslaved Africans (Another at least 800,000 enslaved africans were later sent to mainland Spanish America through other colonies in the Americas such as Jamaica and Brazil). ; At least 388,000, or 4% of those who survived the Middle Passage, arrived directly from Africa to present day United States.

After the gradual emancipation of most black slaves, slavery continued along the Pacific coast of South America throughout the 19th century. Peruvian slave traders kidnapped Polynesians, primarily from the Marquesas Islands and Easter Island, and forced them to perform physical labour in mines and the guano industry of Peru and Chile.

Today, Latinos across the Americas have differing proportions of Native American, African, and European genetic ancestry, shaped by local historical interactions with migrants brought by the slave trade, European settlement, and indigenous Native American populations. Genetic studies show that the majority (75% or 520-560 Million people) who identify as Hispanic/Latino carry at least some degree of West and Central African ancestry.

== Enslavement of the peoples of the Americas: the encomienda system ==
Encomienda (Spanish pronunciation: [eŋkoˈmjenda]) was a labor system in Spain and its empire. It rewarded invaders with the labor of particular groups of subject people. It was first established in Spain during the Roman period but was also used following the Christian conquest of Muslim territories. It was applied on a much larger scale during Spanish colonization of the Americas and the Philippines. Subject people were considered vassals of the Spanish monarch. The Crown awarded an encomienda as a grant to a particular individual. In the conquest era of the sixteenth century, the grants were considered to be a monopoly on the labor of particular groups of Indians, held in perpetuity by the grant holder, called the encomendero, and his descendants.

With the ouster of Christopher Columbus, the Spanish crown sent a royal governor, Fray Nicolás de Ovando, who established the formal encomienda system. In many cases, Native Americans were forced to do hard labor and subjected to extreme punishment and death if they resisted. One conquistador, Bartolomé de las Casas, was sent to the Caribbean to conquer the land in the name of the Spanish crown. He was rewarded with an encomienda for the effort he gave in honor of the crown, but after years of seeing the poor treatment of indigenous people, he refused to allow such treatment to continue. Las Casas sailed back to Spain, asking King Ferdinand and his wife Isabella to ban Indigenous slavery. In return, he suggested the use of African slaves for the hard labor of the new farmlands in the Caribbean, as they had been enslaving their own in a continent-wide system since 700AD. By this time, the Spanish had already been using African slaves bought from African Slaving Empires for some of their hard labor in Europe. Due to the persuasion of Las Casas, Queen Isabella of Castille forbade Indian slavery and deemed the indigenous to be "free vassals of the crown". Las Casas expanded on the issue in the famous Valladolid debate. Various versions of the Leyes de Indias, or Laws of the Indies, from 1512 onwards attempted to regulate the interactions between the settlers and natives. The natives continued to fight wars for their improved treatment for hundreds of years. Both natives and Spaniards appealed to the Real Audiencias for relief under the encomienda system. This caused a greater divide between the Spanish and the lower classes of the indigenous people. According to the new laws set in place by the Spanish crown, the indigenous people gained some status, albeit still lower than Spanish citizens. This allowed the Spanish to maintain control over the indigenous people by allowing them to assume they would have some power coming from these new laws. However, these laws only tricked the indigenous people into agreeing to the encomienda system. They were allowed to live a more 'civilized' life among the Spanish but were under the impression they would eventually gain the ability to own land for themselves, which was never the intention of the Spanish citizens.

The encomienda system brought many indigenous Taíno to work in the fields and mines in exchange for Spanish protection, education, and a seasonal salary under the pretense of searching for gold and other materials. Many Spaniards took advantage of the regions now under the control of the laborious Spanish encomenderos to exploit the native population by seizing their land and wealth. It would take some time before the Native Americans revolted against their Spanish oppressors and many military campaigns before Spanish Emperor Charles V abolished the encomienda system as a form of slavery. Raphael Lemkin, coiner of the term genocide, considers Spain's abuses of the Amerindian population in the Americas to constitute cultural and even outright genocide, including the abuses of the Encomienda system. He described slavery as "cultural genocide par excellence," noting that "it is the most effective and thorough method of destroying cultures and de-socializing human beings." He considers colonists guilty due to their failure to halt the abuses of the system despite royal orders. Recent research suggests that the spread of old-world diseases appears to have been aggravated by the extreme climatic conditions of the time and by the poor living conditions and harsh treatment of the native people under the encomienda system of New Spain. The primary death driver was work conditions that made any acquired sickness a death sentence, as workflow was expected to be maintained.

== Enslaved Africans in Latin America ==
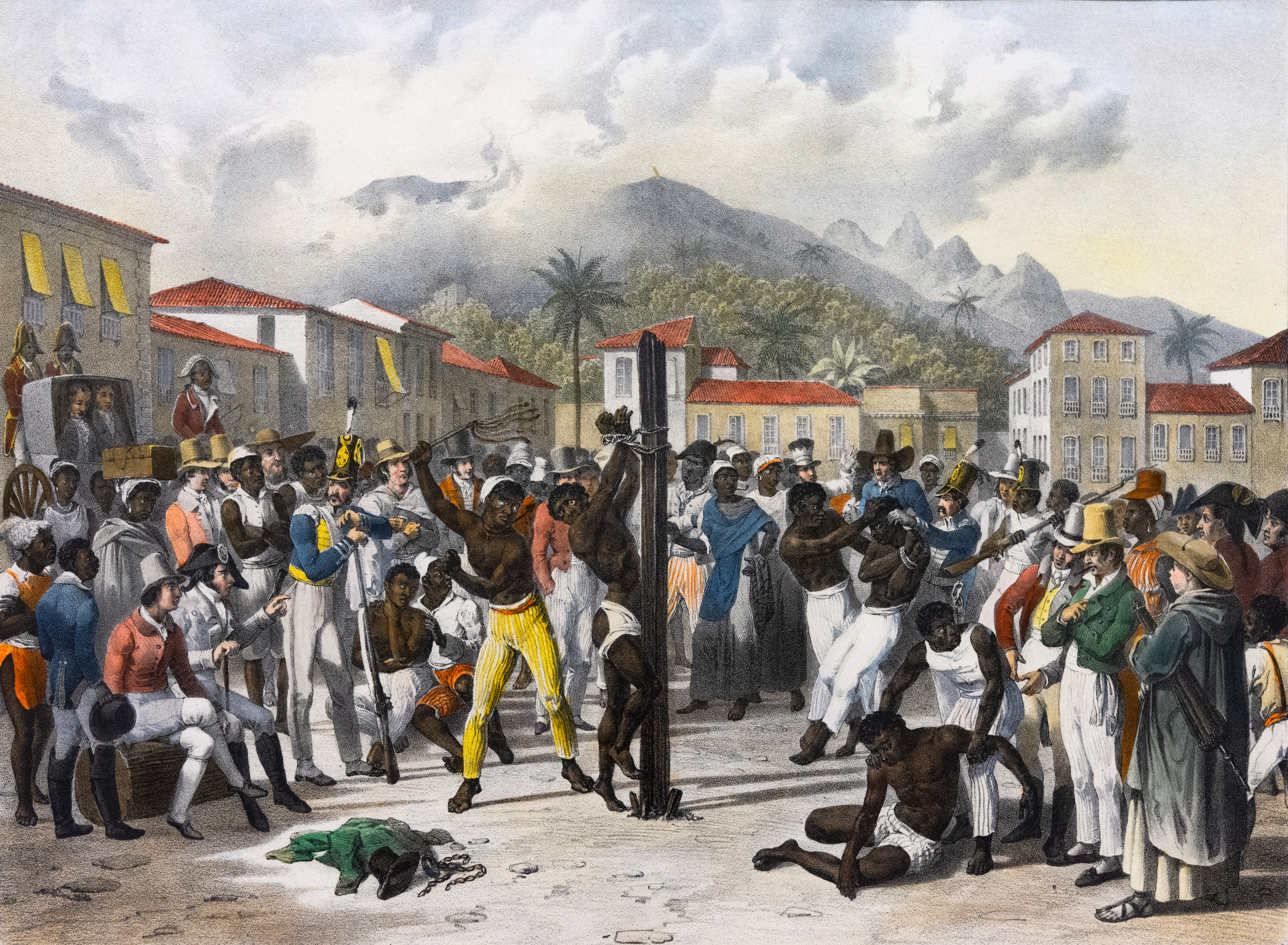
Punishing slaves in Brazil, by Johann Moritz Rugendas

The African influence on Latin American culture is deeply rooted and can be seen in various aspects such as music, dance, religion, and cuisine. Despite the harsh conditions of slavery, African slaves were able to preserve their cultural traditions. By the first decades of the sixteenth century, they were commonly participating in Spain's military expeditions.

The impact of slavery on culture is incredibly apparent in Latin America. The mixing of cultures and races provides the region with a rich history

=== Atlantic slave trade ===
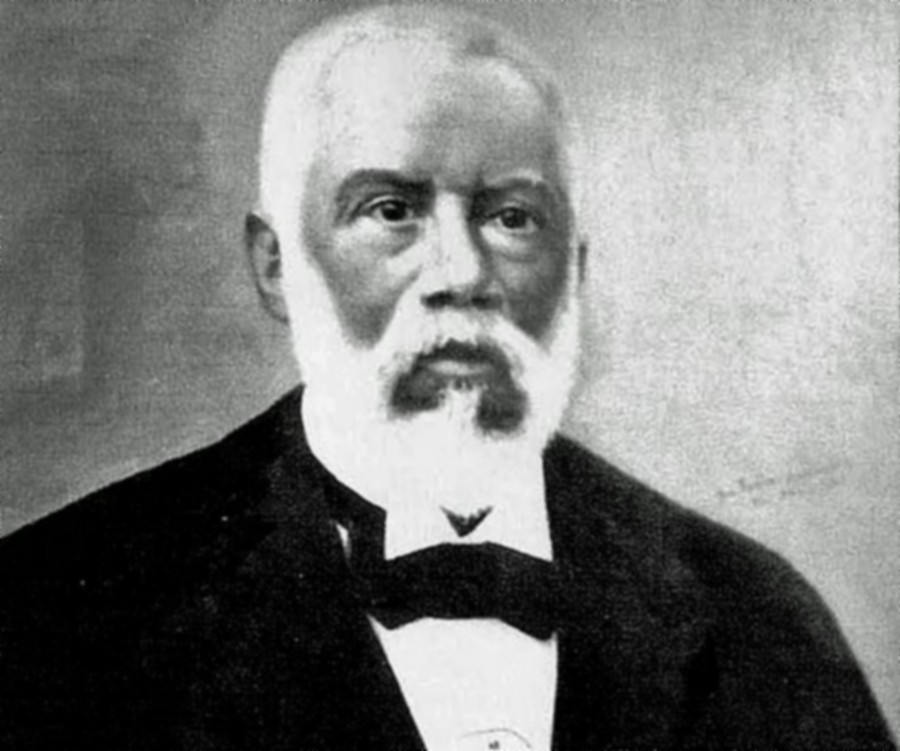
Francisco Paulo de Almeida (1826-1901), first and only Baron of Guaraciaba, title granted by Princess Isabel. Negro, he possessed one of the greatest fortunes of the imperial period, getting to own approximately one thousand slaves.

During the entire period of the Atlantic Slave Trade, from the sixteenth to the nineteenth centuries, in which slavery existed in the Americas, Brazil was responsible for importing 35 per cent of the slaves from Africa (4 million) while Spanish America imported about 20 per cent (2.5 million). These numbers are significantly higher than the number of slaves imported to the United States (less than 5 per cent). High death rates, an enormous number of runaway slaves and greater levels of granting slave freedom, called manumission, meant that Latin America and Caribbean societies had fewer slaves than the United States at any given time. However, they made up a higher percentage of the population throughout the colonial period. As a result of this higher percentage, the upper class of these societies constantly feared an uprising among not only slaves but Indians and the poor of all racial and ethnic groups.

It was the capital of European merchants, rather than European states, which allowed the Atlantic Slave Trade to take shape in the early sixteenth century. For example, in exchange for granting loans in support of Charles V's election as Holy Roman Emperor in 1519, the German Welser trading house was given immense privileges in the Americas by the Spanish crown, including a license to trade enslaved Africans. Over the next two decades, many other European merchants would pay the Spanish crown for the right to import Africans as slaves to the Americas, further enmeshing unfree labor as a key factor in the colonial Latin American economy. Into the eighteenth century, even as American elites began to take a role in the Atlantic trade, European-based traders remained at the heart of the slave trade. Lisbon-based traders, especially, were key to the continuation of the slave trade to Brazil in the 1700s because new forms of credit there allowed for even larger and more profitable slave voyages than had been possible before.

=== Slavery in practice ===
Over 70 percent of slaves in Latin America worked on sugar cane plantations due to the importance of this crop to the economies there at the time. Slaves also worked in the production of tobacco, rice, cotton, fruit, corn, and other commodities. The majority of slaves brought to the Americas from Africa were men due to the fact plantation owners needed strength for the physical labor that was done in the fields. However, women were brought to the Caribbean islands to provide labor as well. Female slaves were often responsible for cutting cane, fertilizing plants, feeding cane stalks in mill grinders, tending garden vegetables, and looking after children. Men cut cane and worked in mills. They also worked as carpenters, blacksmiths, drivers, etc. In some cases, they were even part of the plantation's militia.

Notably, despite mining's immense importance to the colonial economy, African slaves were rarely forced to work in the mines. This was partially due to the glut of Indians, both enslaved and free, who were available to work in the mines. Through practices such as encomienda, the repartimento and mita labor drafts, and later, wage labor, Spanish colonial authorities were able to compel Indians to participate in the backbreaking labor of the silver mines. Specifically because of how labor-intensive and dangerous mining was, it would not have been nearly as profitable for Spanish elites to have forced enslaved Africans to work in the mines. If an Indian were killed or injured and no longer able to work they could be replaced by another Indian without any cost to the mine owners. However, if a slave were killed, or injured and thereby no longer able to work, that would represent a loss of capital to the slaveholder.

=== Slavery and the Catholic Church ===
Slavery was part of the indigenous cultures much before the landfall of the Europeans in America. After Columbus made landfall in America in 1492, the Spanish monarchs Ferdinand II and Isabella I asked Pope Alexander VI to grant Spain the same authority over the American "Indies" that Portugal had over West Africa, so Spain would not be at a disadvantage in making use of her newly discovered territories. He did so in two bulls issued on 3 May 1493. The bulls included authority "...to invade, search out, capture, and subjugate ... any ... unbelievers ... wherever they may be ... and to reduce their persons into perpetual slavery..."

Although the Church was excited by the potential for huge numbers of conversions in the New World, the clergy sent there were often horrified by the methods used by the conquerors, and tensions between church and state in the new lands grew rapidly. The encomienda system of forced or tenured labor, begun in 1503, often amounted to slavery, though it was not full chattel slavery. The Leyes de Burgos ("Laws of Burgos"), issued by Ferdinand II on 27 December 1512, were the first set of rules created to control relations between the Spaniards and the recently conquered indigenous people. Though intended to improve the treatment of the Indians, they simply legalized and regulated the system of forced Indian labor. During the reign of Charles V, the reformers gained steam, with the Spanish missionary Bartolomé de las Casas as a notable leading advocate. His goal was the abolition of the encomienda system, which forced the Indians to abandon their previous lifestyle and destroyed their culture. His active role in the reform movement earned Las Casas the nickname "Defender of the Indians". He was able to influence the king, and the fruit of the reformers' labor was the New Laws of 1542. However, conquistadors led by Gonzalo Pizarro (half-brother of Francisco Pizarro) revolted in protest, and the alarmed government revised the Laws to be much weaker to appease them. Continuing armed indigenous resistance, for example in the Mixtón War (1540–41) and the Chichimeca War of 1550, resulted in the full enslavement of thousands of captives, often out of the control of the Spanish government.

The second Archbishop of Mexico (1551–72), the Dominican Alonso de Montúfar, wrote to the king in 1560 protesting the importation of Africans, and questioning the "justness" of enslaving them. Tomás de Mercado was a theologian and economist of the School of Salamanca who had lived in Mexico and whose 1571 Summa de Tratos y Contratos ("Manual of Deals and Contracts") was scathing about the morality of the enslavement of Africans in practice, though he accepted "just-title" slaves in theory.

Pressure for the end of slavery and forced labor among the indigenous Indians worked to increase the demand for African slaves to do the work instead. Rodrigo de Albornoz, a layman, was a former secretary to Charles V sent as an official to New Spain, who opposed the treatment of the indigenous, though himself importing 150 African slaves. Las Casas also supported the importation of African slaves as preferable to Amerindian forced labor, although he later changed his mind about this.

== Slave families ==
Slave families among the enslaved in Latin America contributed to various changes on plantations with regards to relationships. Slave families benefited both the enslaved and the enslaver. For the enslaved, the concept of community and relationship was crucial in making life tolerable, while producing and committing to their duties on the plantations that they worked. Within the coffee plantations of the Paraiba Valley, the Brazilian economic center from 1822-1889, the presence of the slave family was very significant in terms of not only population but their purpose. For the enslaver, the acceptance and use of slave families brought peace and stability to the plantations and farms that they owned. This was done by allowing slaves the freedom to produce relationships, as well as to freely practice culture and social activities such as singing, praying, dancing, chatting, rest, and community meals. The concept of slave communities led to the belief that the plantation would be peaceful, but also more successful, as rebellions and general disturbances, a typical concern among plantation owners, would be less of an issue. The plantation communities are a similar concept to Maroons, although major differences include purpose and place. The planation communities created through family ties and shared hardships, along with other fractional freedoms received from the enslavers, allowed for the coffee plantations within Paraiba to produce high profit and productivity. Enslavers would often promote slave families, as they would gain the benefit of the production of new laborers, through the courtship of the enslaved. This was most common on plantations with higher populations, as it was easier to pair off the enslaved due to the greater balance between the sexes within the population. However, it seems unlikely that the plantations with lower population wouldn't do the same. Increased morale, through slave communities created a more balance relationship between the enslaved and the enslaver, as well as labor and profit. Slave families and relationships of the 19th century marked a drastic change in slavery, as just a few centuries prior, slave marriages and relationships among slaves were believed to be the source of crime, social unrest, maroonage and rebellion throughout the slave populations.

The slave communities also benefited from the senzala. The senzala brought together and kept slave communities connected. These community style homes were common among the fazendas in Latin America, and were made up of mainly earthy materials. The typical structure consisted of and used the wattle and daub building style, had thatched roofs, and beaten earth floors. Some senzalas were more finished and had tile roofs and finished floors. It was typical for most senzalas to be divided into separate 9-12 meter square cubicles, so that each family had their own space. The close conditions of these homes made it easy for the enslaved to further connect and develop the community-style relationship that was at the forefront of the fazendas and plantation system of Latin America. As stated by Flávto dos Santos Gomes, author of Africans and Slave Marriages in Eighteenth-century Rio de Janeiro: "Family arrangements and forms of compadrio helped slaves invent identities related to the communities in which they lived."

=== Wet Nurses ===
In colonial Latin America, the practice of utilizing a wet nurse was common among the wealthy elite and their wet nurses were typically enslaved black women. The primary duty of a wet nurse included breastfeeding her infant charge, but many enslaved wet nurses were also skilled in domestic labor and could also help with ironing, laundry, sewing, hairdressing, and cooking. Their services would be advertised and solicited for in local newspapers. It was not uncommon for enslaved women to be advertised for hire "with or without child," leaving the buyer to decide the fate of the still breastfed black child.

The use of enslaved black wet nurses was the cause of controversy in medical journals across Latin America. Medical professionals cited health concerns such as malnutrition, maltreatment, and the transfer of poor morals via the breast milk. Black wet nurses were blamed for the high infant mortality rate. Colonial academics also cited fears that inviting an enslaved black woman into one's home to raise one's children could lead to the disruption of the social hierarchy endemic to the time.

Slave relationships, especially marriage began to decrease in frequency towards the end of the 19th century. One of the factors being that enslaved women began to become more involved with their owners, seemingly due to the demand of their nursing duties. This demand brought the enslaver and enslaved quite literally closer together, allowing for these unlikely relationships to develop. According to an 1872 census in Ilhéus, the relationships between slave and enslaver were still atypical as only 12.5% of the population was mixed or pardo. The percentage was small, but still large enough to effect and disrupt the relationships and family life of the enslaved populations.

=== Slave Mothers and Women ===
Slave mothers endured many difficulties throughout the process of Latin American slavery, including fighting for the freedom of their children, and the freedom for themselves. Slave mothers for centuries were denied motherhood and freedom, forced to watch their children enter an era of chattel slavery, described by Barbara Bush, author of African Caribbean Slave Mothers and Children: Traumas of Dislocation and Enslavement Across the Atlantic World: as being born into "a womb of iron and gold". For mothers and slave families alike, a time of relief and change was long overdue. The end of the 19th century provided this through a new means of legal freedom. Havana and Rio de Janeiro are historically known for their heavy use of slavery and slave institutions, but also for the freedom that they provided. Havana and Rio de Janeiro provided slaves with the opportunity for freedom, an opportunity that happened to be used most by enslaved women. These cities, known for there "urban freedom" that captivated the enslaved from all around Latin America to come and make freedom claims. Starting in 1870, gradual and legal abolition was administered from these major cities. Havana and Rio were home to major legal and political institutions, which included the Brazilian national parliament and appeals court located in Rio, and the Spanish Governor General and colonial offices of Havana. Escaping slaves flocked to these "urban freedom" centers in hopes of freedom. When reviewing the claims for freedom made in these cities, it is apparent that women were at the forefront of the search for legalized freedom. A database created by Keila Grinburg provides data that supports this trend. Among thirty cases of freedom claims made in Rio between 1871 and 1888, 27 were done by women (90%). This was an improvement from data collected from 1850-1870 where sixteen out of 34 (47%) claims were done by women. Grinburg had a wider selection of Cuban data, that shows that of the 710 claims made between 1870-1886 in Havana, 452 were women (64%). Within the same timeline and also in Havana 130 appeals were made on behalf of another person, that was most often than not for children. Of the 130 appeals, 105 were made by women (81%). Latin American women dominated legalized abolition in the late 19th century. The trend of women dominating legal freedom could be attributed to various reasons, including, escaping relationships with slave owners, a mother's instincts to care for her children, or superior knowledge of the slave court system during this time.

== Slave resistance ==
As in any slave society, enslaved people in Latin America resisted their oppressors and often sought to establish their communities outside of Hispanic control. In addition to more passive forms of resistance, such as intentional work slowdowns, the colonial period in Latin America saw the birth of numerous autonomous communities of runaway slaves. In Brazil, where the majority of the enslaved people in Latin America were concentrated, these communities were called mocambos or quilombos, words which came from the Mbundu language which was widely spoken in the regions of Angola from which many of the enslaved people in Brazil were taken. These communities were often located in proximity to population centres or plantations, as they largely relied on activities such as highway theft and raids to sustain themselves. Mocambos were also often assisted by Black people still residing in towns, such as in the city of Salvador, where Black people living in the city aided the residents of a nearby Mocambo by helping them enter the city at night to purchase gunpowder and shot. From what historical evidence is available, it appears that, in most cases, the aims of most Mocambos were not an overthrow of the colonial system, but merely their continued existence outside of white society.

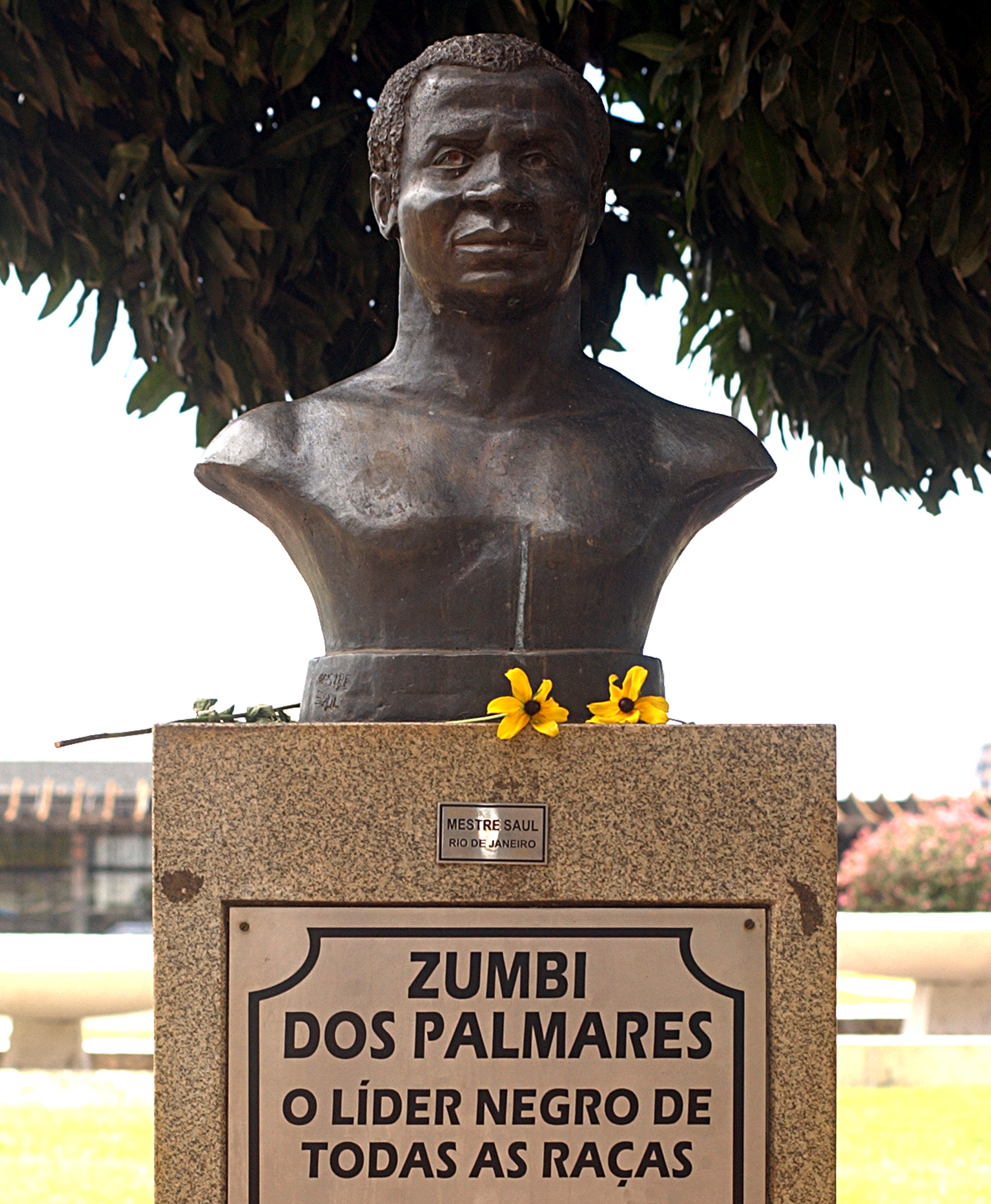
Bust of Zumbi dos Palmares, the last king of the quilombo of Palmares.

=== Palmares ===
One of the most powerful quilombos in colonial Brazil was the settlement of Palmares, located in the remote captaincy of Pernambuco. Palmares were much longer-lasting than many of the other quilombos in Brazil. Despite continued efforts to destroy it, Palmares survived for almost the entire seventeenth century, until its eventual destruction at the hands of the Portuguese colonial government in 1694—a few of its inhabitants were able to hold out for a few more years, but Palmares was reported as "almost extinct" by 1697. At its height, Palmares is said to have had as many as 20,000 inhabitants, although this number is disputed by historians, some of whom argue that the true population of Palmares was closer to 11,000. Like other quilombos, the inhabitants of Palmares did not seek the overthrow of the colonial system. In 1678, faced with increasing military pressure from the Portuguese, the king of Palmares, Ganga Zumba, offered to swear loyalty to the Portuguese Crown in exchange for a recognition of the quilombo's freedom. The Portuguese took Zumba's offer, and then immediately reneged on its terms, continuing their military expeditions against Palmares until its eventual destruction.

== Wealthy African-descended women ==
=== In New Spain ===
Slaveholders, slaves and freed slaves of West and Central African descent were the most watched people in the societies of New Spain, the explanations differ but there is the repetitive correlation between status, family and economic stability that women during this time endured. West and Central African slaves were still prominent in Spanish colonies, however, a rise in societal class was forming: free wealthy West and Central African women, who owned slaves themselves. As status and elegance were a major definer in the Spanish culture, it became apparent what was setting these West and Central African-descent people apart was how they dressed as opposed to the elegance in fabrics, jewels and other prestige items. Freedom becomes more popular for those descended people, forcing them to figure out how to take care of their families' needs from an economical standpoint and statues was a primary factor in their drive towards wealth. Polonia de Ribas was one of many other famous West and Central African-descended slave-owning women, who challenged the predetermined gender roles of men in the family realm and for free women who were not supposed to obtain these luxuries post-freedom. As a result of the trading that was happening from the Atlantic slave trade, many women took the opportunity to purchase slaves to set up their financial stability but in Polonia's case, she was gifted two slaves following her manumission which helped her immensely. Slaves were easily the most expensive item to purchase during that time, not the equipment or the plantation but the slaves, so imagine how financially detrimental it was if one of their slaves would die. It was said that many women used politics in their slave-owning practices but Polonia's additional financial investments helped further her success in her life and other West and Central African-descent slaveowners. Financial investments like working or owning inns since these Spanish colonies were centred around trade, and loaning money to neighbors but she always kept an official notarial account which accounted for all loans and debts; this is important for historians' research. The women often profited from the doweries that were given to them through the marriage of their husbands, this was another way in which women would be set up with economical status while ensuring a life provided. Slave-owning by women of West and Central African -descent was said to be just a way of supporting their families when no husband was present but it could also have something to do with the lust and the want to be a part of this society that has oppressed them constantly.

=== In Peru ===
As seen in the previous section, the main focus is status in society, post-freedom of enslaved women but in Peru, status is closely correlated to its relationship with clothing because of the power it held in an ethically diverse, slaveholding society. It seems absurd that one would enslave after being enslaved but it was because of the "aesthetic" behind having slaves, the exceptionalism one attains within societal eyes when being an owner of slaves. In Peru, the separation in classes and hierarchies was something that Spaniards did not take lightly because they felt an elite sense of European dominance, which was the focal point in the city of Lima when Spaniards wanted to assert dominance over the way that African-descended women dressed and what their clothing signified. African women whether free or not began to have stipulations on what they were to wear through sumptuary laws enforced by white Limeños, trying to secure that autonomy would not be achieved by their oppressors. These laws allowed for only Spanish and elite women were able to wear elegant clothing, gold, silver, silk and slippers with silver bells on them. These laws targeted slave owners and slaves, making sure that they had that separation in classes. Slaves could not afford to wear clothes like that so they must be stealing, this was the thought process of the Spanish lawmakers. If freed women looked like Spanish women then how would you tell them apart, it was considered trickery and they were scrutinized for it so the solution was to wear wool. As clothing does gain more societal popularity and significance, showing the means/wealth of a person but now in a very public fashion. Slaveowners decided that their slaves needed to be dressed in rich clothing to maintain and articulate this elite presence in what is called livery. For freed African-descent women, they were not supposed to dress like elite Spanish but since they were not the targeted subject, they were able to wear skirts and blouses made of lace.

=== In Colombia ===
In Cartagena, clothing and fashion were also at their prime when trying to distinguish between the elite, freed slaves and slaves, but in this culture. It was because African-descent women were being provocative in the way they dressed so nicely while performing common tasks, whether at home or in public, being referred to as "brash and disruptive." Fear is what drove the Holy Office to perform such intense trials when condemning these women because they did not want their people taking control of them. African-descended women were renounced because of their love magic that correlated with the witch trials that were happening during that time. African women were standing out because they were wealthy, the disruption that was seen as a sin or a distraction was just African women wearing clothes made of materials that only elites were to wear. It did not matter whether or not you were wealthy, this was just an expressive way for enslaved and freed slaves to show their individuality, regardless of another oppressor. "Mostly well-off nonwhite women who could not claim the honorable statues of wealthy Española's still dressed as if they were rich and lived in luxury." The passing down of these fine clothes and jewels only aided the future generations to continue this stand against oppression.

== 20th century ==
=== Mexico ===
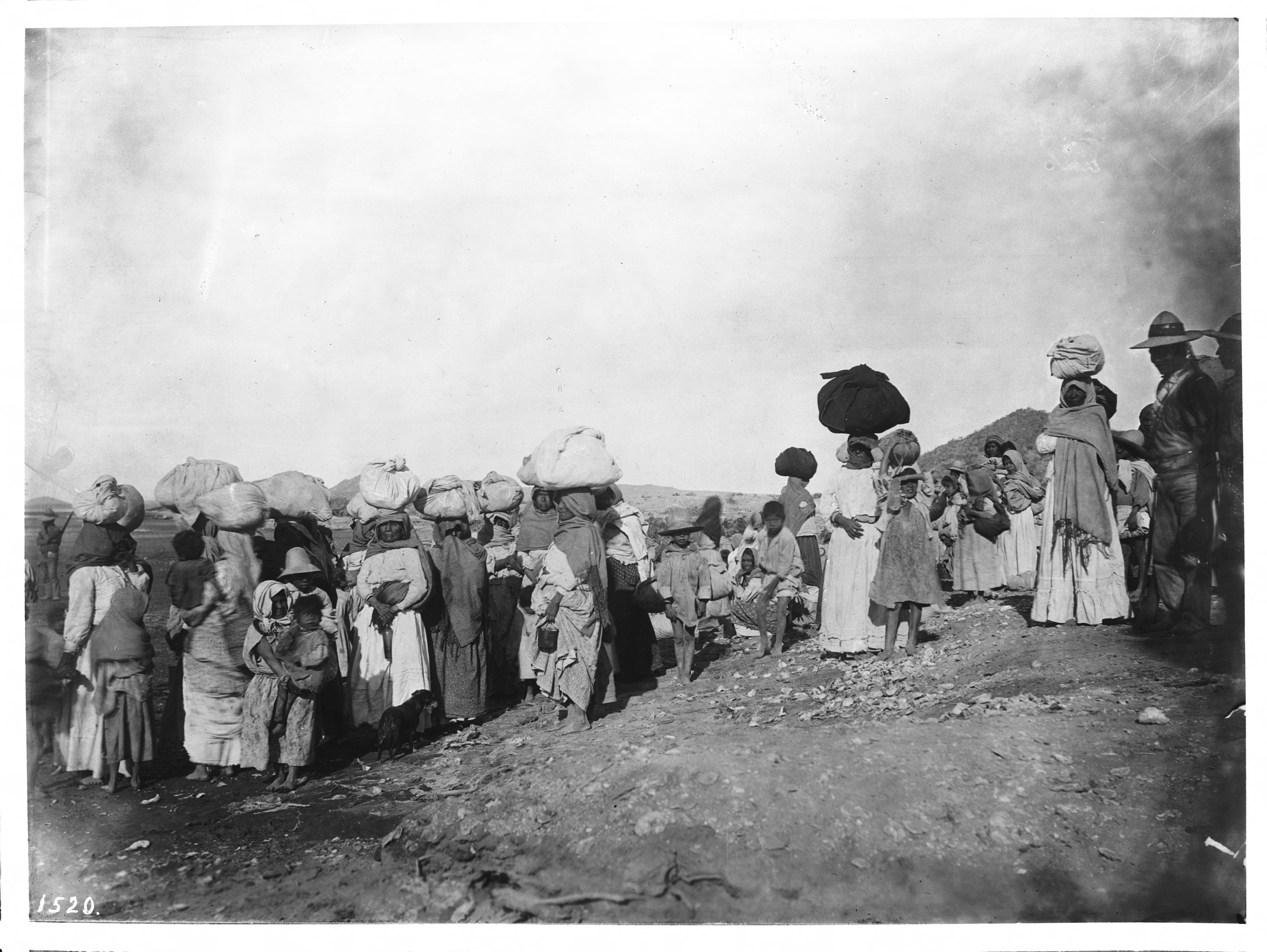
Yaqui prisoners in Mexico, c. 1910

Although on September 16, 1825, President Guadalupe Victoria, on the occasion of the Independence celebrations, ordered the erection of a stage in front of the Diputación, whose words engraved in wood expressed the right to freedom for slaves, Mexicans, the majority of whom were indigenous people from all parts of the Mexican Republic, continued to be segregated and used as slaves until the end of the Mexican Revolution.

During the deportation of Yaqui under the Porfiriato, the Mexican government established large concentration camps in San Marcos, where the remaining Yaqui families were broken up and segregated. Individuals were then sold into slavery from inside the station and packed into train cars which took them to Veracruz, where they have embarked yet again for the port town of Progreso in the Yucatán. There they were transported to their final destination, the nearby henequen plantations.

By 1908, at least 5,000 Yaqui had been sold into slavery. At Valle Nacional, the enslaved Yaquis worked until they died. While there were occasional escapes, the escapees were far from home and without support or assistance, most of them died of hunger while begging for food on the road out of the valley toward Córdoba.

At Guaymas, thousands more Yaquis were put on boats and shipped to San Blas, where they were forced to walk more than 200 miles (322 km) to San Marcos and its train station. Many women and children could not withstand the three-week journey over the mountains and their bodies were left by the side of the road. Yaquis, particularly children, were rattled off in train cars to be sold as slaves in this process having one or two die simply in the process of deportation. The deaths were mostly caused by unfettered smallpox epidemics.

On the plantations, the Yaquis were forced to work in the tropical climate of the area from dawn to dusk. Yaqui women were allowed to marry only non-native Chinese workers. Given little food and the workers were beaten if they failed to cut and trim at least 2,000 henequen leaves per day, after which they were then locked up every night. Most of the Yaqui men, women and children sent for slave labor on the plantations died there, with two-thirds of the arrivals dying within a year.

=== Amazon ===
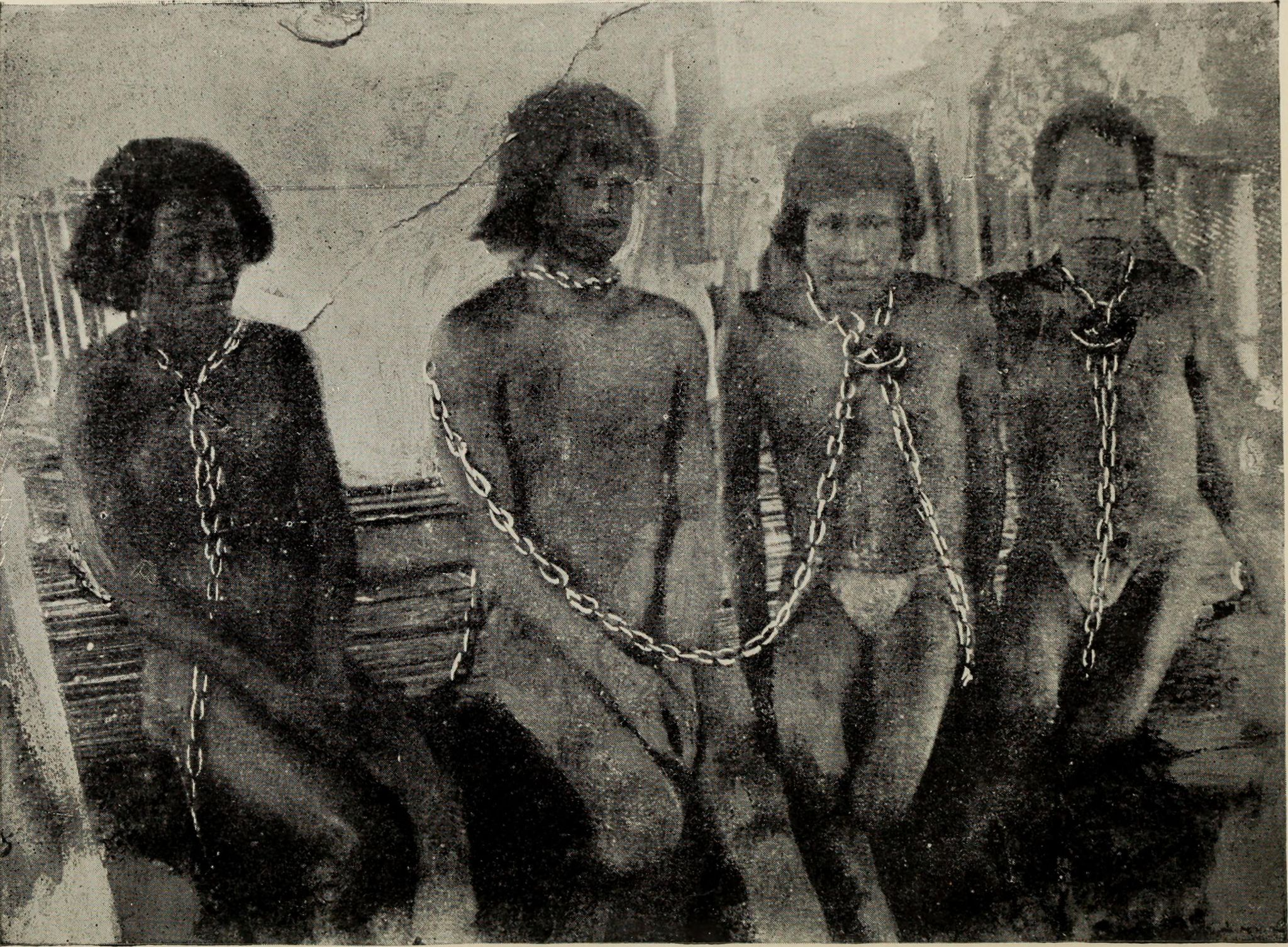
Enslaved Amazon Indians in 1912

The Amazon rubber boom and the associated need for an increasing workforce had a significant negative effect on the indigenous population across Brazil, Peru, Ecuador, and Colombia. As rubber plantations grew, labor shortages increased. The owners of the plantations or rubber barons were rich, but those who collected the rubber made very little, due to a large amount of rubber that was needed to be profitable. The rubber barons rounded up all the Indians and forced them to tap rubber out of the trees. One plantation started with 50,000 Indians, but when discovered, only 8,000 were still alive. Slavery and systematic brutality were widespread and in some areas, 90% of the Indian population was wiped out. These rubber plantations were part of the Brazilian rubber market, which declined as rubber plantations in Southeast Asia became more effective.

Roger Casement, an Irishman traveling the Putumayo region of Peru as a British consul during 1910–1911 documented the abuse, slavery, murder, and use of stocks for torture against the native Indians: "The crimes charged against many men now in the employ of the Peruvian Amazon Company are of the most atrocious kind, including murder, violation, and constant flogging."

According to Wade Davis, author of One River: "The horrendous atrocities that were unleashed on the Indian people of the Amazon during the height of the rubber boom were like nothing that had been seen since the first days of the Spanish Conquest." Rubber had catastrophic effects in parts of Upper Amazonia, but its impact should not be exaggerated nor extrapolated to the whole region. The Putumayo genocide was a particularly horrific case, and the Putumayo was also the only region subjected to a systematic inquiry or investigation during the rubber boom. Carlos Fermín Fitzcarrald led violent slave raids against Asháninka, Mashco, Piro, Conibo, Harákmbut and other native groups around the Ucayali, Urubamba, and Manu Rivers between 1880-1897. Carlos Scharff exploited and enslaved Yine, Machiguenga, Amahuaca, Yaminahua, Mashco, Piro, and other native groups along the Jurua, Purus, and later Las Piedras River until he was killed in 1909 during a mutiny. Slave raids that were carried out by employees of Nicolás Suárez Callaú led to the destruction of homes, and further persecutions against natives around the Beni and Mamore Rivers.

Shortly after their arrival, the rubber barons began their incursions, a bloody method of obtaining indigenous labour by which, with the support of already-conquered indigenous groups, they would make armed forays into nearby hamlets. They would capture women and youths in particular, who formed precious trading objects, whilst adult men were eliminated as they would never form as malleable a workforce as the children, who were more easily and fully assimilated (Note: "They would capture women and youths in particular, who formed precious trading objects, whilst adult men were eliminated as they would never form as malleable a workforce as the children, who were more easily and fully assimilated".) In these circumstances, the high death rate and family disintegration caused panic among the mainly native populations, some of whom chose to flee.

— Beatriz Huertas Castillo, Indigenous Peoples in Isolation in the Peruvian Amazon: Their Struggle for Survival and Freedom

Many nearby rubber regions were not ruled by physical violence, but by the voluntary compliance implicit in patron-peon relations. Some native peoples benefited financially from their dealings with the white merchants. Others chose not to participate in the rubber business and stayed away from the main rivers, because tappers worked in near-complete isolation; they were not burdened by overseers and timetables. In Brazil, tappers could and did, adulterate rubber cargoes by adding sand and flour to the rubber "balls", before sending them downriver. Flight into the thicket was a successful survival strategy and because Indians were engaged in credit relations, it was a relatively common practice to vanish and work for other patrons, leaving debts unpaid.

== See also ==
- Freedom of wombs
- African diaspora
- Afro-Latino
- Afro-Mexicans
- Blackbirding
- Netto Question
- Racism in North America
- Racism in South America

== Bibliography ==
- Varese, Stefano (2004). Salt of the Mountain Campa Asháninka History and Resistance in the Peruvian Jungle. University of Oklahoma Press. ISBN 9780806135120.
- Huertas Castillo, Beatriz (2004). Indigenous peoples in isolation in the Peruvian Amazon. The International Work Group for Indigenous Affairs.
- Hecht, Susanna (2013). The Scramble for the Amazon and the Lost Paradise of Euclides Da Cunha. University of Chicago Press. ISBN 9780226322834.
