= Racism by country =

The article lists the state of race relations and racism in a number of countries.

Various forms of racism are practiced in all countries on Earth. In individual countries, the forms of racism which are practiced may be motivated by historic, cultural, religious, economic or demographic reasons.

Racism is widely condemned throughout the world, and as a result, 182 states are parties to the International Convention on the Elimination of All Forms of Racial Discrimination as of 14 May 2026.

- Racism in Africa
  - Racism in Algeria
  - Racism in Botswana
  - Racism in Burundi
  - Racism in Egypt
  - Racism in Ethiopia
  - Racism in Ivory Coast
  - Racism in Libya
  - Racism in Mauritania
  - Racism in Niger
  - Racism in Nigeria
  - Racism in Namibia
  - Racism in Rwanda
  - Racism in Somalia
  - Racism in South Africa
  - Racism in Sudan
  - Racism in Tanzania
  - Racism in the Republic of the Congo
  - Racism in Tunisia
  - Racism in Uganda
  - Racism in Zimbabwe
- Racism in Asia
  - Racism in Bahrain
  - Racism in China
  - Racism in India
  - Racism in Israel
  - Racism in Indonesia
  - Racism in Iran
  - Racism in Iraq
  - Racism in Japan
  - Racism in Lebanon
  - Racism in Malaysia
  - Racism in Myanmar
  - Racism in North Korea
  - Racism in Oman
  - Racism in Pakistan
  - Racism in Palestine
  - Racism in Qatar
  - Racism in Saudi Arabia
  - Racism in Singapore
  - Racism in South Korea
  - Racism in Thailand
  - Racism in the Philippines
  - Racism in the United Arab Emirates
  - Racism in Vietnam
- Racism in Europe
  - Racism in Austria
  - Racism in Belarus
  - Racism in Denmark
  - Racism in Finland
  - Racism in France
  - Racism in Germany
  - Racism in Greece
  - Racism in Hungary
  - Racism in Iceland
  - Racism in Ireland
  - Racism in Italy
  - Racism in Latvia
  - Racism in Lithuania
  - Racism in Norway
  - Racism in Poland
  - Racism in Portugal
  - Racism in Romania
  - Racism in Russia
  - Racism in Spain
  - Racism in Sweden
  - Racism in Switzerland
  - Racism in Netherlands
  - Racism in the Soviet Union
  - Racism in the United Kingdom
  - Racism in Turkey
  - Racism in Ukraine
- Racism in North America
  - Racism in Canada
  - Racism in Mexico
  - Racism in the Dominican Republic
  - Racism in the United States
    - Racism in Oregon
    - Racism in Puerto Rico
- Racism in Oceania
  - Racism in Australia
- Racism in South America
  - Racism in Argentina
  - Racism in Bolivia
  - Racism in Brazil
  - Racism in Chile
  - Racism in Cuba
  - Racism in Guyana
  - Racism in Peru
  - Racism in Venezuela
- Racism in the Arab world
  - Racism in Israel
  - Racism in the Middle East

== See also ==
- Antisemitism by country
- Committee on the Elimination of Racial Discrimination
- Index of racism-related articles
- Category:Discrimination by country
