= Racism in South America =

The continent of South America is culturally and racially diverse. This article examines by country and region the current and historical trends in race relations and racism within South America. Racism of various forms is to be found worldwide. Racism is widely condemned throughout the world, with 170 states signatories of the International Convention on the Elimination of All Forms of Racial Discrimination by August 8, 2006. In different countries, the forms that racism takes may be different for historic, cultural, religious, economic or demographic reasons.

== Argentina ==
Indigenous people, immigrants, Afro-Argentines, mestizos, Jews and Arabs are targets of discrimination in Argentina.

== Bolivia ==
Bolivia is composed of many cultures, including the Aymara, the Quechua, and the Guarani. "Pure" native American people are in general deemed inferior by mestizos and people of European origin. The economic difficulties of the population, the education level of all groups, the economic level of the natives, and the predominant prejudice inherited from colonial times mainly in urban areas aggravates the treatment. The situation has worsened in the last year. The elites, formed mainly by people of foreign origin in the Eastern region, claimed autonomy as a result of the probable redistribution of land, which would go from the more privileged people to the less privileged people (specifically, the Guarani natives and other indigenous people).

On October 10, 2010, the Law Against Racism and All Forms of Discrimination (Spanish: Ley 045 Contra el Racismo y Toda Forma de Discriminación; commonly known as the Law Against Racism) was passed by the Plurinational Legislative Assembly of Bolivia as Law 045. This law intends to combat racism and discrimination, but as of February 2014, no convictions had been recorded. Due to this lack of convictions, the legislation has been widely criticized by the Bolivian media as being a dead letter.

In La Paz, Afro-Bolivians are often discriminated against.

== Brazil ==
In the immediate aftermath of Dom Pedro’s abdication in 1831, the poor people of color, including slaves, staged anti-Portuguese riots in the streets of Brazil's larger cities.

Racism in Brazil has long been characterized by a belief in racial democracy. An ideology stating that racial prejudice is not a significant factor in Brazilian society, and that racism is not an obstacle to employment, education, and social mobility the way some believe it is in other countries. This theory has come under fire in recent years by researchers who say that racism is very much a factor in the country's social life.

Despite the majority of the country's population being of mixed (Pardo), African, or indigenous heritage, depictions of non-European Brazilians on the programming of most national television networks is scarce and typically relegated for musicians/their shows. In the case of telenovelas, Brazilians of darker skin tone are typically depicted as housekeepers or in positions of lower socioeconomic standing. This is a reflection of the economic inequality among races in Brazil, with mixed (Pardo), African and indigenous population constituting the majority of the poor. In addition, the national wealth and income concentrated in the white families.

In a sign that some Brazilian universities have come to see racism as an obstacle to higher education, several of them have created positive action programs aimed at increasing the admission of Afro-Brazilians and members of the native population.

== Chile ==
Afro-Chileans and Haitians are discriminated in Chile.

== Guyana ==
There is a long history of racial tension between the Indo-Guyanese people and the Afro-Guyanese.

Guyana's racial tensions originate in the colonial period in it. Africans were brought to Guyana as slaves and were put to work in sugar and cotton plantations, whereas Indians were brought to Guyana as indentured servants and took the place of Africans that worked on plantations. These historical encounters led to discriminatory stereotyping. For example, Africans were viewed as strong, but lazy. The Indians were viewed as hardworking, but greedy. These groups of people were both used as labor for British colonists, however they both had different stereotypes given to them which affected how one race viewed the other.

Racial tensions in Guyana started to divide more when it came to politics. After the British left and Guyana was freed, the government in Guyana was completely split. When people ran for president it became more of a racial issue, where Indians favored other Indians, which were called the People’s Progressive Party (PPP), and the Afro-Guyanese people favored their own kind of people as well and became their own party called the People’s National Congress (PNC). This split happened during president Cheddi Jagan ruling time.

Racial tensions continued to escalate in the 1900s when Afro-Guyanese people would preach “Africa for Africans.” It did empower the Afro-Guyanese group of people; however, it did divide the country even more. The Indo-Guyanese people also began showing more pride in being Indian, and the women would begin wearing Indian garb. Whenever one race would try and boost themselves, the other race would follow, turning this into a competition in Guyana.

Today Guyana is extremely divided, and if you go to one group of Guyanese people, they would tend to bash the other group of Guyanese people. A study by Monroe College mentions that Indo-Guyanese people, and Afro-Guyanese people seek protection, and vice versa with Afro-Guyanese group of people.

== Venezuela ==
When the Venezuelan War of Independence started, the Spanish enlisted the Llaneros, playing on their dislike of the criollos of the independence movement. During this time, José Tomás Boves led an army of llaneros which routinely killed white Venezuelans. After several more years of war, the country achieved independence from Spain in 1821.

In Venezuela, like other South American countries, economic inequality often breaks along ethnic and racial lines. A 2013 Swedish academic study stated that Venezuela was the most racist country in the Americas, followed by the Dominican Republic.

== See also ==
- Racism by country
- Antisemitism in South America
- Race and ethnicity in Latin America
- Blanqueamiento
- Casta
- Slavery in Latin America
