= Racism in Lithuania =

Racism in Lithuania appears mainly in the form of negative attitudes and actions towards people who are not considered ethnically Lithuanian, especially if the foreigner is of a different race. According to the data provided by the Centre for Ethnic Studies, Roma people, Chechens, refugees and Muslims are regarded with disfavour most of all in Lithuania. Anti-Polish sentiments are also very strong in Lithuania. However, recent research showed that Lithuanians themselves claim to be tolerant. The problem of racism is still not widely admitted, although the government itself has put some effort into reducing xenophobia in Lithuania. Since the mid-2000s, the Law on Equal Opportunities forbids any direct or indirect discrimination on the basis of racial or ethnic origin, gender, religion, nationality or belonging to any other group.

Lithuania is a member of the following international instruments aimed to combat racism: Additional Protocol to the Convention on Cybercrime concerning the criminalisation of acts of a racist and xenophobic nature committed through computer systems (since 2007), Framework Convention for the Protection of National Minorities (since 2000) and Convention on the Elimination of All Forms of Racial Discrimination (since 1998).

There are no estimates of the number of xenophobic acts in Lithuania, but the presence of racism and xenophobia is noted in public opinions, mostly in social media, but even in speeches of politicians, particular, against Africans.

According to the journalist Inga Larionovaitė, Klaipėda may be considered the most racist town in Lithuania, because it is the only city which refused to implement the government program for refugees. However, a rally of skinheads in Vilnius showed that the problem is universal.

== See also ==
- Antisemitism in Lithuania
- Lithuanization
- Racism in Europe
