= Racism in Europe =

Racism has been a recurring part of the history of Europe.

== Belgium ==
Racism in Belgium existed since its independence declaration during the colonial era. A 2011 study shows that racism against sub-saharan people is strongly influenced by its colonial history.

Today racism is present in all 3 main regions of Belgium, specially in Flanders, and widespread in the society: in the police, in schools, in sport activities, on the streets, in public institutions, on social media.

In 2002, a racist crime shocked Belgium, when a man broke into his neighbour's, home of a Moroccan family, killed 2 adults, injured 2 kids and set fire to their apartment. The killer was a notorious activist of the extreme right party Vlaams Blok (today's Vlaams Belang), and apparently decided to act a day after Jean-Marie Le Pen lost the French presidency dispute.

In 2020, the young Adil was killed by the police in Brussels while he was riding a scooter and trying to run away from a police check, when a disguised police car crashed into him. The case is still under investigation, but 3/4 of the police department reported racial comments coming from the policeman that killed Adil, not only related to the case, but also against colleagues under his supervision.

In 2021, a documentary revealed the racism of Flemish football fans. Romelu Lukaku declared having faced racial insults as young as 11 years-old in his first club in Flanders, according to him the insults came from the parents of adverse players, but only when he played against other Flemish teams. The extreme right in the Flemish region is rallying football fans together in racist acts, even across fans from historically adverse teams.

== Bulgaria ==
Romani people remain one of the most discriminated-against groups in Bulgaria. In 2023, Arso Ganev went to a public pool in Kyustendil, Bulgaria with his family. They were rejected due to being Roma. This is not the only case where Romani people are discriminated against in public pools in Bulgaria. On 9 October 1992, the Bulgarian president signed the Council of Europe Framework Convention for the Protection of National Minorities, signaling a new commitment to uphold minority rights.

In 2011, the parliamentary party Ataka, identifying itself as nationalist, attacked the mosque in the center of Sofia during the Friday prayer. In 2013 one of the leaders of another nationalist party, VMRO, Angel Djambasky was put under investigation for calling the people to arm themselves against the immigrants.

At least 6 racist crimes are perpetrated between 3 and 13 November of every year. 112 intellectuals signed a petition to the attorney general not to register the party Ataka, which was rejected by the attorney general.

In October 2019, Bulgarian supporters shouted racist abuse towards Black English footballers during a match.

In June 2023, Bulgaria's Commission for Protection Against Discrimination (CPD) fined VMRO - Bulgarian National Movement (VMRO-BND) because of the “Gypsy Issue” section on their website. They were also prohibited from posting content that promotes hatred against ethnic minorities.

== Cyprus ==
The National Popular Front, or National People's Front (Greek: Εθνικό Λαϊκό Μέτωπο (ΕΛΑΜ), Ethniko Laiko Metopo ELAM (Cyprus)), is a far-right movement (and later, political party) founded in 2008 in the Republic of Cyprus. The party has been the subject of controversy in the Cypriot media and broader political scene. It has been repeatedly accused of promoting racism and being involved in acts of violence. Guest workers have reportedly often been a target of racial abuse from employers, landlords and government employees.

== Denmark ==
A poll from YouGov in 2019 showed that 72% rated their view on Romas as "totally negative", remarkably higher than the other polled Northern European countries, Muslims were also viewed more negatively, with 45% having a negative view. This was also tied first with Finland. The negative perceptions of Black people and Jews, were however lower than the average of the polled countries, with 11% and 8% respectively. In 2014 it was reported that Adoptees with foreign background are often racially abused.

Young non-ethnic Danes have complained that some police officers have acted in a racist manner.

The term hyggeracisme (hygge + racism) is used by some to describe racist phrases/jokes, where the person saying the phrase may perceive it as being unproblematic and funny.

== Estonia ==
In the mid-2010s, NATO soldiers from the U.S. stationed in Estonia as part of Enhanced Forward Presence were subject to racist attacks by local civilians, resulting in condemnations from the Estonian Air Force's commander, Jaak Tarien, and the U.S. embassy's chargé d'affaires. Some Estonians, particularly from the Conservative People's Party, voiced their displeasure at the condemnations.

The Conservative People's Party of Estonia has been described by critics as xenophobic and racist.

== Finland ==
Reports say that racial hate crime is a recent phenomenon, and that they are on the rise. The numbers of reported hate crimes in 2003 and 2004 were 522 and 558, respectively. In 2009, they had increased to over 1,000 (including non-racist hate crimes). Racial hate crimes have fluctuated from 858 (2009) to 641 (2012) and the typical suspect have been a Finnish-born young man. However, over 60% of the targets were reported to have been Finland-born, although those with foreign-born parents were counted as well. The most targeted immigrants in 2004 were reported to be of Somali, Kurdish, Russian, Iraqi and Iranian origin. One-third of the hate crimes were reportedly aimed at the Kale, and only one in six were members of the native population.

In European Social Surveys since 2002, Finns have proved to be least racist just after Swedes. Earlier Finnish scientific data reveals that attitudes had been improving continuously for a long time. Professor of Social Policy and responsible of Finnish ESS, Heikki Ervasti, denies a common thought of increased negative attitudes against immigrants.

A poll made in late 2011 revealed that the majority of the Finns viewed Finland as a racist country. Two thirds considered the country to be fairly racist, 12% recognised a moderate amount of racism, and 2% admitted to be very racist; 35% agreed partly or wholly to the statement "Islam is a threat to Western values and democracy", and 29% agreed more or less to that "people belonging to certain races simply are not suited to live in a modern society". One in five thought "it needs to be recognised as a fact that some nations are more intelligent than others", and 11% agreed partly or completely to "people whose appearance and culture differ much from those of the Finns are unpredictable and frightening".

== France ==
In 1998, the Council of Europe's European Commission Against Racism and Intolerance (ECRI) made a report stating concern about racist activities in France and accused the French authorities of not doing enough to combat this. The report and other groups have expressed concern about organizations such as Front National (France). In a recent Pew Survey, 47% of the French deem immigration from Central and Eastern Europe (mainly from Poland, Slovakia, Bulgaria, Hungary, Serbia and Romania, including Slavic and Romani people) to be a very bad thing. Likewise, the majority of French respondents revealed negative views on the immigration of Muslims from Africa and the Middle East. A small minority showed signs of anti-Semitism. Roughly 11% had an unfavorable view of Jews and 8% felt that US policy was most influenced by the Jews.

According to a report published by the Interior Ministry's Statistics Service (SSMSI), in 2023 hate crimes and offenses motivated by racism, xenophobia, and religion rose by 32% over the previous year 2022. The number of racist offenses increased sharply: 1,636 in 2022 to 3,139 in 2023.

== Germany ==
The period after Germany lost World War I led to an increased use of anti-Semitism and other forms of racism in political discourse, for example among the right-wing Freikorps, emotions that finally culminated in the ascent to power of Adolf Hitler and the Nazi Party in 1933. The Nazi racial policy and the Nuremberg Race Laws against Jews and other non-Aryans represented the most explicit racist policies in Europe in the twentieth century. These laws deprived all Jews including even half-Jews and quarter-Jews as well as other non-Aryans from German citizenship. Jews' official title became "subject of the state". The Nuremberg Race Laws forbade racially mixed sexual relations and marriage between Aryans and at first Jews but was later extended to "Gypsies, Negroes or their bastard offspring". Such interracial relations became a criminal and punishable offence under the race laws known as "racial pollution" Rassenschande. Racism in Nazi Germany was also influenced by Martin Luther's antisemitism.

According to the 2023 report of the European Union Agency for Fundamental Rights, anti-Black racism is rising in European countries, especially Germany. The survey, conducted among black immigrants in 13 EU countries, revealed that approximately a third of participants felt discriminated racially in the previous year, 10% more than the survey conducted six years ago. In Germany, 64% of the participants reported experiencing racial discrimination, nearly twice of the previous survey.

== Greece ==
Golden Dawn emerged as a fringe movement when it was founded in the early 1980s and since then, it has evolved into a far-right group within Greece. Members of Golden Dawn have been accused of carrying out acts of violence as well as hate crimes against immigrants, political opponents, homosexuals and ethnic minorities. In late 2020, the party's leader, Nikolaos Michaloliakos, and six other prominent members and former MPs, were charged with running a criminal organization and guilty verdicts on charges of murder, attempted murder, and violent attacks on immigrants and left-wing political opponents were delivered and they were sent to prison.

Greece had one of the highest numbers of racist incidents in 2015. According to the network of non-governmental organizations Racist Violence Recording Network (RVRN)’s 2015 annual report, the number of racist violence was 273 in 2015. Same organization reported highest number of racist violence since 2015, with a number of 158 attacks, 89 targeting refugees and migrants in 2023.

The Athens-based Racist Violence Recording Network has documented attacks by organised groups across the country against those perceived to be migrants or Muslims.

== Hungary ==
An EU report found that legal policies that should protect people from racism and xenophobia were "not implemented effectively", and it also found that Hungarian public officials denied the fact that racism and discrimination were a problem in their country, despite evidence to the contrary. It noted that such factors contributed to the increase in extremist ideologies in Hungarian politics and media. The Council of Europe has also criticized Hungary in a new report, condemning xenophobia and violence against migrants and minorities.

2013 FRA online survey shows a middle to high level of anti-Semitism in Hungary, compared to other European countries. The banned Hungarian Guard and some Jobbik politicians are sometimes described as xenophobic and racist.

As in other European countries, Romani people in Hungary faced disadvantages, including unequal treatment, discrimination, segregation and harassment. Negative stereotypes are often linked to the high level of unemployment among Romani people and their reliance on state benefits. In 2008 and 2009 nine attacks took place against Romani in Hungary, resulting in six deaths and multiple injuries. According to the Hungarian curia (supreme court), these murders were motivated by anti-Romani sentiment and sentenced the perpetrators to life imprisonment.

== Netherlands ==
In 2006, the Dutch Equal Treatment Commission got 694 requests to judge if a treatment legislation law had been broken. By far the most cases concerned age discrimination (219), race discrimination followed (105) and lesser number of sex discrimination cases. The Dutch Equal Treatment Commission brought out 261 judgements; 46 per cent of the cases were declared discrimination.

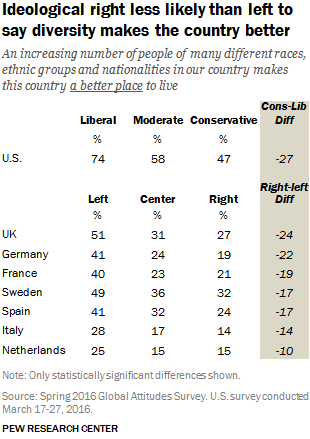
In a 2016 Pew Research Center survey conducted in the US and several European countries, the Netherlands scored lowest for the percentage of people who said that having people of different races living in their country improved it, whereas the US scored highest.

In early 2012, the Dutch right-wing Party for Freedom established an anti-Slavic (predominantly anti-Polish) and anti-Romani website, where native Dutch people could air their frustration about allegedly losing their job because of cheaper workers from Poland, Bulgaria, Romania and other non-Germanic Central and Eastern European countries. This led to commentaries involving hate speech and other racial prejudice mainly against Poles and Roma, but also aimed at other Central and Eastern European ethnic groups.

In a 2016 Pew Research Center survey conducted of the US and several European countries designed to measure countries' citizens acceptance of people of different ethnic groups, the Netherlands scored lowest for the percentage of people who said that having people of different races living in their country improved it, with the vast majority of Dutch respondents whether of liberal or conservative political leanings responding in the negative. In contrast, the US scored highest among all the countries surveyed, being more welcoming to people of different races and ethnic groups than even the highest-scoring European nation, the UK.

Researchers from the University of Amsterdam and Utrecht University conducted between 2016 and 2018 a study where they sent 4,200 job application letters to companies. The fictional applicants were between 23 and 25 years old, with four years of work experience, and applied for real vacancies. All the applicants had a Dutch nationality, but the names and mother tongue of the applicants were adjusted. The conclusion was that Dutch people had the most chances of being invited for a job interview. The candidates with a Western immigrant background had 20% less chance of being invited. And the candidates who had a non-Western immigrant background faced the biggest discrimination with 40% of the applicants not being invited to a job interview. Especially applicants with a Turkish, Moroccan or Antillean background were discriminated against. A side note from the study was that during economic downturns, there was an increased amount of discrimination. For applicants who were discriminated against, an improved CV didn't improve their chances of being invited.

Portrayals of "Zwarte Piet" in the Netherlands have been condemned by some as being racist in recent years.

The police have also been accused multiple times of jeopardizing the safety of anti-Zwarte Piet protest groups during violent attacks by pro-Zwarte Piet protest groups.

According to lawyer Jelle Klaas, the pro-Zwarte Piet movement is starting to become more radicalized. Furthermore, according to terrorism expert Teun Van Dongen, violence by the pro-Zwarte Piet movement is becoming normalized, because white supremacist groups like Pegida and football hooligans have joined the pro-Zwarte Piet movement. Geert Wilders, leader of far-right populist party PVV, was also accused of indirectly supporting the violent behavior of the pro-Zwarte Piet movement by tweeting: "There is only 1 #blackpete and he is BLACK!" (Original: "Er is maar 1 #zwartepiet en die is ZWART!") after a violent attack by the pro-Zwarte Piet movement against the anti-Zwarte Piet movement.

In December 2020, news broke out about a Syrian refugee family living in the town of Heerlen facing violent acts by neighbors; allegedly due to racism. The family ended up fleeing to Belgium, fearing continued harassment.

== Poland ==
The European Union Agency for Fundamental Rights found Poland second least racist country in European Union, with only 19% of respondents experiencing discrimination based on their race or ethnicity.

Annual nationalistic marches in Warsaw have gathered up to 60,000 participants, including some far-right groups chanting slogans such as "We want God" and "Poland for Poles" as well as anti-semitic slogans. Poland also has a major problem with racist football hooligans.

The number of racist incidents in Poland is increasing. In 2013 there were more than 800 racially motivated crimes and in 2016 it had increased to over 1600. Poland tops the list of countries with most attacks on Indian students with 9 of 21 incidents.

== Portugal ==
In one survey measuring nationalist, anti-immigrant and anti-religious minority sentiments, Portugal had the second highest average prevalence score among several European countries.

Leader of the right-wing populist party CHEGA!, André Ventura made several racist remarks. In 2020, Bissau-Guinean-born parliament member Joacine Katar Moreira from the left-wing Livre (Free) party introduced a bill for Lisbon to return artworks to their countries of origin. In response to this, Ventura posted a racist comment on social media: Joacine is herself sent back to her country of origin”

== Romania ==
Romani people are the most hated ethnic group in Romania.

In 2020, in the town of Ditrau, which is primarily populated by Hungarians, three Sri Lankan bakers working in a bread factory caused 350 locals to protest outside the town.hall.

== Russia ==
The term "pogrom" became commonly used in English after a large-scale wave of anti-Jewish riots swept through south-western Czarist Russia in 1881–1884. A much bloodier wave of pogroms broke out in 1903–1906, leaving an estimated 2,000 Jews dead. By the beginning of the 20th century, most European Jews lived in the so-called Pale of Settlement, the Western frontier of the Russian Empire consisting generally of the modern-day countries of Poland, Lithuania, Belarus and neighboring regions. Many pogroms accompanied the Revolution of 1917 and the ensuing Russian Civil War, an estimated 70,000 to 250,000 civilian Jews were killed in the atrocities throughout the former Russian Empire; the number of Jewish orphans exceeded 300,000.

In the 2000s, neo-Nazi groups inside Russia had risen to include as many as tens of thousands of people. Racism against both the Russian citizens (peoples of the Caucasus, indigenous peoples of Siberia and Russian Far East, etc.) and non-Russian citizens of African, Central Asian, South Asian, East Asian (Vietnamese, Chinese, etc.) and European (Irish, etc.) heritage is a significant problem.

Since 2008, the number of hate crimes in Russia declined significantly.

The main outcome of 2009 was a clear reduction in the number of victims of racist and neo-Nazi motivated violence for the first time in six years of observation conducted by SOVA Center. To some extent, credit should go to the law enforcement agencies who suppressed the largest and most aggressive ultra-right groups in the Moscow region in the second half of 2008 and in 2009. However, despite all efforts, xenophobic violence remains alarming in its scope and extends over most of the Russian regions, affecting hundreds of people.

— Galina Kozhevnikova, SOVA Center

The Russian Orthodox Church "believes it is vital for Russia to pursue anti-extremist campaign and develop a sustainable strategy." As a result, it has called for immigrants to be given jobs and the opportunity to learn more about Russian culture. In addition, it has called for skinheads to refocus their mission to legally preventing crime and immoral behavior.

== Slovenia ==
Romani people have become the main target of Slovenian racists in the 21st century as the population is otherwise extremely homogeneous.

== Spain ==
Gitanos are viewed with less sympathy than other groups.

Racist abuse aimed at black footballers has been reported at Spanish football league matches in recent years. This has led to protests and UEFA fines against clubs whose supporters continue the abuse. Several players in the Spanish league including Barcelona striker Samuel Eto'o and Espanyol goalkeeper Carlos Kameni have suffered and spoken out against the abuse. In 2006, Real Zaragoza player Ewerthon stated: "the Spanish Federation have to start taking proper measures and we as Afro-European players also have to act."

== Sweden ==
In 1922 Sweden established the Statens institut för rasbiologi, or state institute for race biology. The institute recommended the sterilization by force of the mentally ill, physically disabled, homosexuals and ethnic minorities, which was allowed by Swedish law until 1975.

According to the 2005 report Racism and Xenophobia in Sweden by the Board of Integration, Muslims are exposed to the most religious harassment in Sweden. Almost 40% of the interviewed said they had witnessed verbal abuse directed at Muslims. European Network Against Racism in Sweden claims that in today's Sweden there exists a clear ethnic hierarchy when ethnic Swedes are at the top and non-European immigrants are at the bottom.

In 1999, Neo-Nazis in Malexander murdered two policemen during a robbery to obtain funds for a fascist organization.

Sveriges Radio reported that the punishments for driving under the influence of alcohol tended to be harsher for immigrants than for Swedes; while over 50% of immigrants were sent to jail for driving under the effect of alcohol, only less than 30% of ethnic Swedes were sent to jail with the same level of alcohol found in blood. There has been evidence that the Swedish police used "Neger Niggersson" as a nickname for a criminal in a police training; this was published in Swedish media. Lately however, many incidents of racial attitudes and discrimination of the Swedish police have led for the first time to the control of racial attitudes of police students under police education A recent research done by the Swedish Confederation for Professional Employees (TCO) found that people with foreign background have much lower chances of finding a job that is appropriate for their education, even when they have grown up in Sweden and got their education in Swedish institutes.

In 2007, there were a total of 3,536 hate crimes (defined as crimes with an ethnic or religious motive) reported to the police, including 118 cases of anti-Semitic agitation. Racism in Sweden is reported to appear within Swedish health-care services as well. A nurse at a Stockholm suburb hospital lost his job after complaining on racial attitudes of the hospital staff to patients with immigrant background. Staff was cited saying "go back to Arabia", "the patient is screaming because it's in his culture."

Swedish social services have reported on racism in Swedish hospitals as well. A study of statistics Sweden (SCB) reveals that segregation is widespread for Swedish immigrants when there are large differences in the fields of education, housing, employment and politics between immigrants and ethnic Swedes. Sweden has been criticized by the UN human rights council for an increasing number of hate crimes which seldom resulted in criminal charges, when more hate crimes are Islamophobic, and homophobic, with an increasing amount of racist propaganda appearing on the internet and in Sweden's schools, for failing to provide adequate health care and education to immigrants, asylum seekers and undocumented migrants and the ongoing discrimination of the Roma and Sami minorities in Sweden.

A study was conducted in 2011 about the Swedes attitudes to mixed marriages. The conclusion was that the views in general were favorable, but that there was a strong hierarchy based on which groups to live with. Swedes primarily preferred relationships with Scandinavians, Western Europeans and Southern Europeans, and then Eastern Europeans, Central Europeans and Latin Americans. At the bottom were South and East Asians, Africans, and Middle Eastern people. Older individuals and women, as well as people with less education and people who were brought up outside of Malmö (the most multicultural city of Sweden), were generally more prone to having negative attitudes. Most were able to accept family members and friends living in mixed relationships, even if they did not want to do it themselves.

Swedish national television (SVT) has reported on a new research done in Sweden which identifies that job seekers with a Swedish name have 50% higher chances to be called for an interview than job seekers with middle-eastern names. The research enlightens that there is not much difference between foreign-born job seekers and job seekers born in Sweden if both don't have a Swedish name; this indicates that ethnic discrimination is the main cause of the variations.

In 2012, Swedish Minister for Culture Lena Adelsohn Liljeroth was labelled a racist by The Afro-Swedish Society (Afro-svenskarnas riksförbund) because she cut up a cake in the shape of a naked African woman in public. The cake was made by an Afro-Swedish artist.

In 2015, a mass stabbing occurred when a Swedish man motivated by opposition to immigration attacked four people at a school in Trollhättan with a sword, killing three, before committing suicide by cop.

== Switzerland ==
The Swiss Confederation or Confederatio Helvetica is a country composed of four subcultural groups: German-speaking (63.7%), French-speaking (20.4%), Italian-speaking (6.5%) and Romansh-speaking (0.5%).

Swiss "Confederation Commission Against Racism" which is part of the Swiss "Federal Department of Home Affairs" published a 2004 report, Black People in Switzerland: A Life between Integration and Discrimination (published in German, French, and Italian only). According to this report, discrimination based on skin colour in Switzerland is not exceptional, and affects immigrants decades after their immigration.

Swiss People's Party claims that Swiss communities have a democratic right to decide who can or cannot be Swiss. In addition, the report said "Official statements and political campaigns that present immigrants from the EU in a favourable light and immigrants from elsewhere in a bad light must stop", according to the Swiss Federal Statistics Office in 2006, 85.5% of the foreign residents in Switzerland are European. The United Nations special rapporteur on racism, Doudou Diène, has observed that Switzerland suffers from racism, discrimination and xenophobia. The UN envoy explained that although the Swiss authorities recognised the existence of racism and xenophobia, they did not view the problem as being serious. Diène pointed out that representatives of minority communities said they experienced serious racism and discrimination, notably for access to public services (e.g. health care), employment and lodging.

The 2009 Swiss minaret referendum banned the construction of new minarets—towers traditionally attached to mosques—by a 57 to 43 popular vote of the country. In the 2021 Swiss referendums, the electorate banned the wearing of a full face covering, which some Orthodox Muslim women wear.

== United Kingdom ==
The United Kingdom has a long history of racism. The Evidence for Equality National Survey (EVENS) conducted in 2023 has shown the prevalence of racism faced by ethnic and religious groups in Britain. Nearly one in six reported having been the victim of a physical assault motivated by race. 17% of respondents said that their personal property had been damaged. There is also evidence for structural racism in the report: in education and employment about a third of the respondents reported racial discrimination.

A 2023 University of Cambridge survey which featured the largest sample of Black people in Britain found that 88% had reported racial discrimination at work, 79% believed the police unfairly targeted black people with stop and search powers and 80% definitely or somewhat agreed that racial discrimination was the biggest barrier to academic attainment for young Black students.

== See also ==
- Racism by country
- Geography of antisemitism#Europe
- Fascism in Europe
- Neo-Nazism#Analogous European movements
- Radical right (Europe)
- Eurocentrism
- Environmental racism in Europe
- Anti-Romani sentiment
- Antisemitism in Europe
- Anti-Islamic hate crimes in the European countries
- Cagot
