= Dutch Equal Treatment Commission =

The Dutch Equal Treatment Commission is an independent organisation that was established in 1994 to promote and monitor compliance with this legislation. The Commission also gives advice and information about the standards that apply. Everyone in the Netherlands can ask the Commission for an opinion or advice about a specific situation concerning unequal treatment, free of charge.

== See also ==
- Racism by country: Netherlands
