= Racism in Latvia =

Expression of racism in Latvia include racist discourse by politicians and in the media, as well as racially motivated attacks. European Commission against Racism and Intolerance notes some progress made in 2002–2007, mentioning also that a number of its earlier recommendations are not implemented or are only partially implemented. The UN Special Rapporteur on contemporary forms of racism, racial discrimination, xenophobia and related intolerance highlight three generally vulnerable groups and communities: ethnic Russians who immigrated to Latvia under USSR, the Roma community and recent non-European migrants. Besides, he notes a dissonance between "opinion expressed by most State institutions who view racism and discrimination as rare and isolated cases, and the views of civil society, who expressed serious concern regarding the structural nature of these problems".

== Legal framework ==
Article 91 of the Constitution provides that "Human rights shall be realised without discrimination of any kind". Various laws forbid discrimination, including racial one, in various fields. Section 78 of the Criminal Law provides, as at 2017:

(1) For a person who commits acts directed towards triggering national, ethnic, racial or religious hatred or enmity,

the applicable punishment is deprivation of liberty for a term up to three years or temporary deprivation of liberty, or community service, or a fine.

(2) For a person who commits the same acts, if they are committed by a group of persons or a public official, or a responsible employee of an undertaking (company) or organisation, or if it is committed utilising an automated data processing system, the applicable punishment is deprivation of liberty for a term up to five years or temporary deprivation of liberty, or community service, or a fine.

(3) For committing the act provided for in Paragraph one of this Section, if it is related to violence or threats or if it is committed by an organised group, the applicable punishment is deprivation of liberty for a term up to ten years, with or without probationary supervision for a term up to three years.

Section 48 of the same law allows racist motives of a crime to be considered aggravating circumstances.

Among the international instruments aimed to combat racism, Latvia is member of the Additional Protocol to the Convention on Cybercrime (since 2007), Framework Convention for the Protection of National Minorities (since 2005, with declarations) and Convention on the Elimination of All Forms of Racial Discrimination (since 1992; declaration to allow individual complaints is not made, as at 2017). Besides, Latvia is member of some conventions forbidding discrimination, including racial, in certains fields (Discrimination (Employment and Occupation) Convention, 1958 and Convention against Discrimination in Education).

ECRI's recommendation to Latvia include making the declaration under CERD and ratification of various other treaties, including Protocol No. 12 to the European Convention on Human Rights, European Convention on Nationality, Convention on the Participation of Foreigners in Public Life at Local Level, European Charter for Regional or Minority Languages and International Convention on the Protection of the Rights of All Migrant Workers and Members of Their Families.

=== Reporting documents on relevant treaties ===
Treaty	Latvia's report	Reaction by experts body
Discrimination (Employment and Occupation) Convention, 1958	.	2017
Framework Convention for the Protection of National Minorities	2016	2018
Convention on the Elimination of All Forms of Racial Discrimination	2017	2018

== Racist crimes ==
Crimes motivated by racism include violent attacks, desecration of cemeteries, as well as inciting hatred.

The number of convictions under Section 78 of the Criminal Law: 2 in 2010 (suspended deprivation of liberty), 4 in 2011 (3 – deprivation of liberty for a period less than 1 year; 1 – suspended deprivation of liberty), 2 in 2012 (suspended deprivation of liberty), 7 in 2013 (suspended deprivation of liberty), 7 in 2014 (suspended deprivation of liberty).

== Racism in politics and media discourse ==
ECRI has noted recourse to racist expressions by politicians and media to remain a problem in its 2007 report, specifying two types of racist speech: first, geared against immigrants, certain ethnic group such as Roma and religious minorities including Jews and Muslims, and second, related to relations between Latvians and Russian-speaking population.

In 2010, the political party Visu Latvijai!, earlier described as racist by the political scientist Nils Muižnieks (former Latvia's minister for social integration, later head of Council of Europe's Commission against racism and intolerance), has entered parliament and in 2011, the government. The same year, a scandal has erupted concerning expressions of the foreign minister Ģ. V. Kristovskis, criticised by his partner in the ruling coalition Aivars Lembergs stating "A contemporary human is incompatible with racism. I'm glad Kristovskis isn't a physician". Kristovskis has kept his post.

== Evaluations of the scale of racism ==
At the ECRI high-level panel meeting in 2005, Jean-Yves Camus, a political scientist, has described racism as "a feature of daily life" in a case study of Latvia. In 2006, the Latvian minister of foreign affairs said that "Latvia is no longer protected from expressions of racism, which is particularly noticeable on the streets of Riga during the dark hours of the day and during the dark months". Experts asked by the official newspaper Latvijas Vēstnesis in 2007, have considered racism not to be mass-scale or typical for Latvia's society in general. In 2007, the European Commission against racism and intolerance has noted that "the main concern of experts in the fight against racism is the widespread denial of the problem of racist violence both on the part of the public and the authorities".

In 2008, the minister for social integration Oskars Kastēns has declared, that racism in Latvia is on a non-dangerous level, and the chair of parliamentary human rights commission Jānis Šmits has said in a meeting with ECRI delegation, that hooliganism should not be confused with racism, which allegedly doesn't exist in Latvia (Šmits was contested by other participants of the meeting – leader of NGO Afrolats K. Ejugbo has called the problem of racism very acute, and expert from centre PROVIDUS M. Golubeva has called it to be more and more urgent), due to ethnic Latvians being a peaceful people. The ombudsman has written in his 2008 report, that racially motivated attacks are "not rare".

== Complaints about discrimination ==
In 2003, UN Committee on the Elimination of Racial Discrimination was "concerned at the low number of cases initiated relevant to article 4" and recommended that Latvia "consider whether the limited numbers of complaints is not the result of the victims' lack of awareness of their rights, a lack of confidence on the part of individuals in the police and judicial authorities, or the authorities' lack of attention or sensitivity to cases of racial discrimination". Ombudsman's office's (in 2005 and 2006, National Human Rights Office's) statistics on complaints about discriminations on grounds covered with ECRI's mandate were the following.

Year	Written applications/oral consultations about discrimination on grounds of race and ethnicity	Written applications/oral consultations about discrimination on ground of language	Written applications/oral consultations about discrimination on ground of religion
2005	5 written, 10 oral	0 written, 5 oral	0 written, 1 oral
2006	9 written, 40 oral	14 written, 14 oral	0
2007	13 written, 40 oral	17 written, 3 oral	11 written, 1 oral
2008	23 written, 34 oral	20 written, 46 oral	1 written, 4 oral
2009	14 written, 12 oral	14 written, 8 oral	1 oral
2010	9 written, no information on oral	4 written, no information on oral	0 written, no information on oral

In 2007, civil society associations considered the low number of discrimination complaints to reflect lack of public awareness of their rights and Ombudsman's competencies rather than the real situation with racial discrimination in the country.

== See also ==
- Curonian colonisation
  - Couronian colonization of the Americas
