= Racism in Africa =

Racism in Africa refers to prejudice or discrimination towards different ethnicities or races on the continent of Africa.

Ethnic Pygmy populations in Central Africa have suffered from racialized discrimination from Bantu peoples. They are frequently ostracized from participation in wider society in the various African countries that they live in and are seen as untouchables. Racially-motivated attacks have occurred on Pygmies including rape and cannibalization.

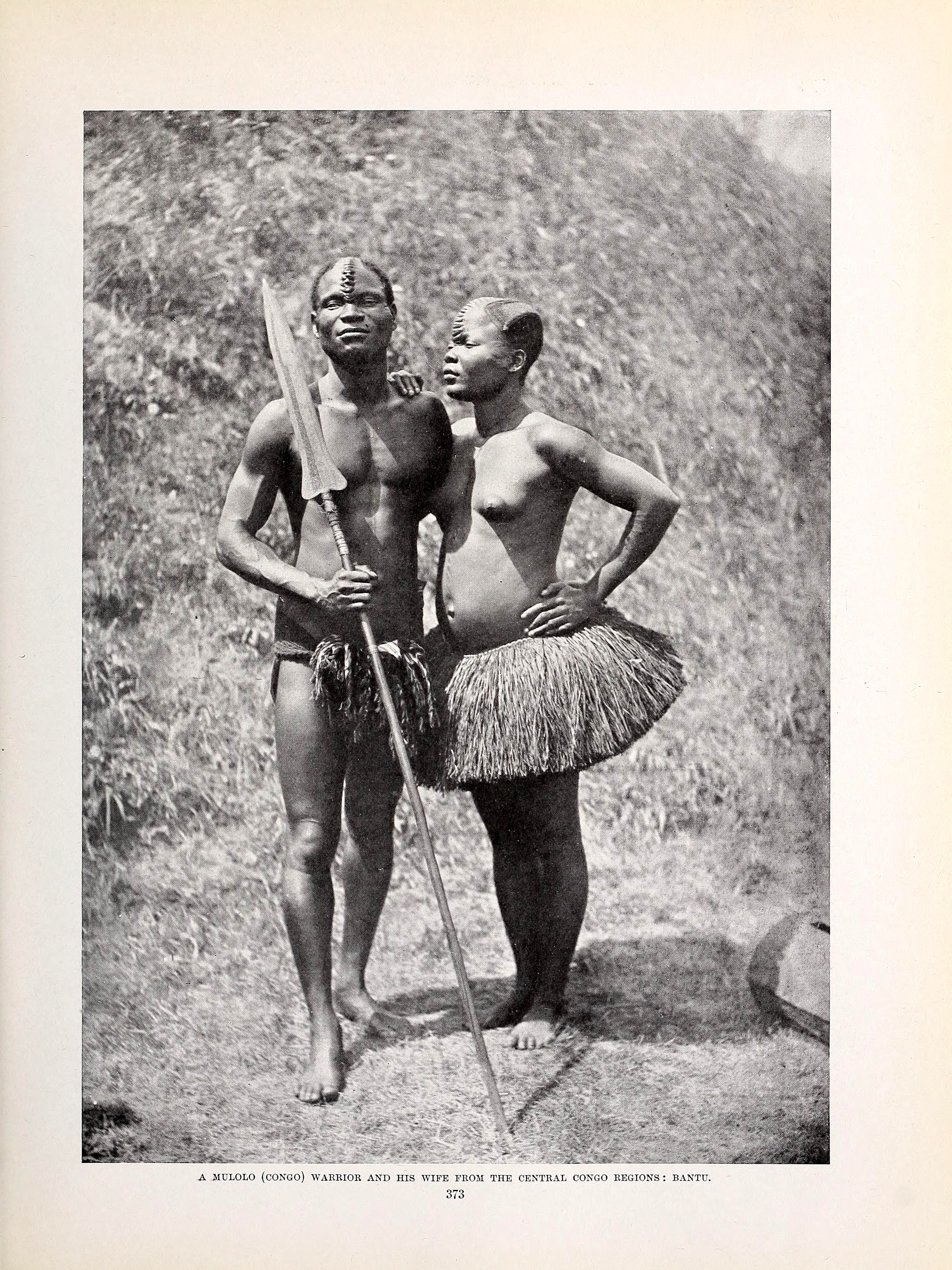
A Mulolo (Congo) warrior and his wife from the central Congo regions; Bantu

== Burundi ==
The area was ruled as a colony by Germany (before World War I) and Belgium. Because Tutsis had been the traditional governing elite, both colonial powers kept this system and allowed only the Tutsi to be educated and only they could participate in the colonial government. Such discriminatory policies engendered resentment.

When the Belgians took over the colony, they believed the colony could be better governed if they continued to identify the different populations. In the 1920s, they required people to identify with a particular ethnic group and classified them in censuses. European colonists viewed Africans in general as children who needed to be guided, but noted the Tutsi to be the ruling culture in Rwanda-Burundi. In 1959, Belgium reversed its stance and allowed the majority Hutu to assume control of the government through universal elections after independence. This partly reflected internal Belgian domestic politics, who later saw the discrimination against the Hutu majority as similar to oppression within Belgium suffered from the Flemish-Walloon conflict. They saw the democratization and empowerment of the Hutu as a just response to the Tutsi domination. The Belgian policies wavered and flip-flopped considerably during this period leading up to independence of Burundi and Rwanda.

The Hutu majority had revolted against the Tutsi but was unable to take power. Tutsis fled and created exile communities outside Rwanda in Uganda and Tanzania. Since the nation's independence, more extremist Tutsi came to power and oppressed the Hutus, especially those who were educated. Their actions led to the deaths of up to 200,000 Hutus. Overt discrimination from the colonial period was continued by different Rwandan and Burundian governments, including identity cards that distinguished Tutsi and Hutu.

The Belgian-sponsored Tutsi Rwandan monarchy survived until 1959, when Kigeli V was exiled from the colony (then called Ruanda-Urundi). In Burundi, Tutsis, who are the minority, maintained control of the government and military.

In Burundi, a campaign of genocidal violence, known as Ikiza was conducted against the country's Hutu population in 1972, and an estimated 100,000 Hutus died. In 1993, Burundi's first democratically elected president, Melchior Ndadaye, who was Hutu, was believed to be assassinated by Tutsi officers, as was the person constitutionally entitled to succeed him. This sparked a period of civil strife between Hutu political structures and the Tutsi military, in which an estimated 500,000 Burundians died. There were many mass killings of Tutsis and moderate Hutus; these events were deemed genocide by the United Nations International Commission of Inquiry for Burundi.

== Ethiopia ==
Racism in Ethiopia has traditionally been directed at the country's Nilotic ethnic minorities. Collectively, these groups are locally known as Shanqella or barya, derogatory terms originally denoting slave descent, irrespective of the individual's family history.

Historically, the Shanqella constituted most of the slave labour in the ruling local Afro-Asiatic societies. The Abyssinians (Habesha highlanders) were also noted as having actively hunted the Shanqella during the 19th century. Following the abolition of the slave trade in the 1940s, the freed Shanqella and barya were typically employed as unskilled labour. Racial discrimination against the barya or Shanqella communities in Ethiopia still exists, affecting access to political and social opportunities and resources.

Traditionally, racism against perceived barya transcended class and remained in effect regardless of social position or parentage. As a result, former President of Ethiopia Mengistu Haile Mariam was virtually absent from the country's controlled press in the first few weeks of his seizure. By contrast, Mengistu's rise to prominence was hailed by the southern Shanqella groups as a personal victory, with one of their own having made good.

Although other populations in Ethiopia have faced varying degrees of discrimination, little of that adversity has by contrast been on account of racial differences. It is instead more typically rooted in disparities in class and competition for economic status. The often socio-economically disadvantaged Oromo and Gurage are thus not considered by the highlander groups as being racially barya, owing to their similar physical features and common Afro-Asiatic ancestry.

In terms of traditional perceptions, the Shanqella likewise racially contrast themselves from the Afro-Asiatic populations. The Anywaa (Anuak) Nilotes of southern Ethiopia consequently regard the Amhara, Oromo, Tigray and other Afro-Asiatic groups collectively as gaala in contradistinction to themselves.

== Ivory Coast ==
In 2001, Ivory Coast saw a resurgence in ethnic hatred and religious intolerance. In addition to the many victims among the various tribes of the northern and southern regions of the country that have perished in the ongoing conflict, foreigners residing or visiting Ivory Coast have also been subjected to violent attacks. According to a report by Human Rights Watch in 2001, the Ivory Coast government was guilty of fanning ethnic hatred for its own political ends.

In 2004, the Young Patriots of Abidjan, a strongly nationalist organisation, rallied by the state media, plundered possessions of foreign nationals in Abidjan. Rapes and beatings of persons of European and Lebanese descent followed. No deaths were reported. Thousands of expatriates and white or ethnic Lebanese Ivorians fled the country. The attacks drew international condemnation.

== Liberia ==
According to Article 27_b of the Liberian Constitution, Liberian nationality is limited to 'persons who are Negroes or of Negro descent'.

== Mauritania ==
Slavery in Mauritania persists despite its abolition in 1980 and mostly affects the descendants of black Africans abducted into slavery who now live in Mauritania as "black Moors" or haratin and who partially still serve the "white Moors", or bidhan, as slaves. The practice of slavery in Mauritania is most dominant within the traditional upper class of the Moors. For centuries, the haratin lower class, mostly poor black Africans living in rural areas, have been considered natural slaves by these Moors. Social attitudes have changed among most urban Moors, but in rural areas, the ancient divide remains.

The ruling bidanes are descendants of the Sanhaja Berbers and Beni Ḥassān Arab tribes who emigrated to northwest Africa and present-day Western Sahara and Mauritania during the Middle Ages. Many descendants of the Beni Ḥassān tribes today still adhere to the supremacist ideology of their ancestors, which has caused the oppression, discrimination and even enslavement of other groups in Mauritania.

According to some estimates, as many as 600,000 black Mauritanians, or 20% of the population, are still enslaved, many of them used as bonded labour. Slavery in Mauritania was criminalized in August 2007.

== Namibia ==
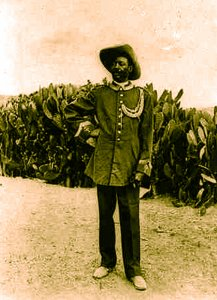
A photo of Herero chief Samuel Maharero

On 12 January 1904, the Herero people, led by Samuel Maharero, rebelled against German colonial rule. In August, German general Lothar von Trotha defeated the Herero in the Battle of Waterberg and drove them into the desert of Omaheke, where most of them died of thirst. In October, the Nama people also rebelled against the Germans, suffering a similar fate.

The violence eventually led to a genocide of the Herero and Nama people by the Germans, known as the Herero and Namaqua genocide. In total, 24,000 to 100,000 Herero and 10,000 Nama died. The genocide was characterized by a high number of deaths from starvation and thirst; the Herero who fled the violence were prevented from returning from the Namib Desert. Some sources also claim that the German colonial army systematically poisoned desert wells. The genocide took place between 1904 and 1907 in German South-West Africa (now modern day Namibia), during the Herero Wars.

In 1926, except for archive copies, records of the genocide were withdrawn and destroyed following a decision of the then Legislative Assembly.

Survivors, majority of whom were women and children, were eventually put in concentration camps, such as the one at Shark Island, where the German authorities forced them to work as slaves for German military and settlers. All prisoners were categorized into groups fit and unfit for work, and pre-printed death certificates indicating "death by exhaustion following privation" were issued. The British government published their widely known account of the German genocide of the Nama and Herero peoples in 1918.

Many Herero died later of disease, overwork and malnutrition. Camps, such as that in Windhoek, had mortality rates as high as 61% The mortality rate in the camps was 45% in 1908. The death rates are calculated to be between 69% and 74%.

Food in the camps was extremely scarce, consisting of rice with no additions. Shootings, hangings and beatings were common, and the sjambok was used by guards who treated the forced labourers harshly. Medical experiments were performed on the Herero and Nama people by the Germans, similar to those performed on the European Jews during the Holocaust. Eugen Fischer, a German anthropologist, came to the concentration camps to conduct medical experiments on race, using children of Herero people and mulatto children of Herero women and German men as test subjects. Other experiments were made by Dr Bofinger, who injected Herero that were suffering from scurvy with various substances including arsenic and opium; afterwards he researched the effects of these substances by performing autopsies on the dead bodies

With the closure of concentration camps, all surviving Herero were distributed as labourers for settlers in the German colony, and from then on, all Herero over the age of seven were forced to wear a metal disc with their labour registration number, and banned from owning land or cattle, a necessity in pastoral society.

In 1985, the United Nations' Whitaker Report classified the aftermath as an attempt to exterminate the Herero and Nama peoples of South-West Africa, and therefore one of the earliest attempts at genocide in the 20th century. The German government recognised and apologised for the events in 2004, but has ruled out financial compensation or land reparation for the victims' descendants. In 2004, there was only minor media attention in Germany on this matter.

About 4,000 commercial land owners, mostly whites, own over 50% of the arable land across the country despite a land reform process undertaken by the Namibian government. When the country was known as South West Africa, White Namibians enjoyed a highly privileged position due to apartheid laws enforcing strict segregation and white domination.

== Niger ==
Diffa in Niger

In October 2006, Niger announced that it would deport to Chad the "Diffa Arabs", Arabs living in the Diffa region of eastern Niger. Their population numbered about 150,000. While the government was rounding up Arabs in preparation for the deportation, two girls died, reportedly after fleeing government forces, and three women suffered miscarriages. Niger's government eventually suspended their controversial decision to deport the Arabs.

In Niger, while the practice of slavery was outlawed in 2003, a study has found that more than 800,000 people are still slaves, almost 8% of the population. Slavery dates back centuries in Niger and was criminalised after five years of lobbying by Anti-Slavery International and Nigerian human-rights group, Timidria.

Descent-based slavery, where generations of the same family are born into bondage, is traditionally practiced by at least four of Niger's eight ethnic groups. The slave masters are mostly from the lighter-skinned nomadic tribes: the Tuareg, Fulani, Toubou and Arabs. It is especially rife among the warlike Tuareg, located in the wild deserts of north and west Niger, who roam near the borders with Mali and Algeria. In the region of Say on the right bank of the river Niger, it is estimated that three-quarters of the population around 1904–1905 was composed of slaves.

Historically, the Tuareg swelled the ranks of their black slaves by conducting war raids into other peoples' lands. War was the main source of supply of slaves, although many were bought at slave markets, run mostly by indigenous peoples.

== Republic of the Congo ==
In the Republic of Congo, where Pygmies make up 2% of the population, many Pygmies live as slaves to Bantu masters. The nation is deeply stratified between these two major ethnic groups. The Pygmy slaves belong from birth to their Bantu masters in a relationship that the Bantus call a time-honored tradition. Even though the Pygmies are responsible for much of the hunting, fishing and manual labor in jungle villages, Pygmies and Bantus alike say Pygmies are often paid at the master's whim; in cigarettes, used clothing, or even nothing at all. As a result of pressure from UNICEF and human-rights activists, a law that would grant special protections to the Pygmy people is awaiting a vote by the Congo parliament.

== Rwanda ==
Beginning about 1880, Roman Catholic missionaries arrived in the Great Lakes region. Later, when German forces occupied the area during World War I, the conflict and efforts for Catholic conversion became more pronounced. As the Tutsi resisted conversion, the missionaries found success only among the Hutu. In an effort to reward conversion, the colonial government confiscated traditionally Tutsi land and reassigned it to Hutu tribes, igniting a conflict that has lasted into the 21st century.

The area was ruled as a colony by Germany (before World War I) and Belgium. Because Tutsis had been the traditional governing elite, both colonial powers kept this system and allowed only the Tutsi to be educated and only they could participate in the colonial government. Such discriminatory policies engendered resentment.

When the Belgians took over the colony, they believed the colony could be better governed if they continued to identify the different populations. In the 1920s, they required people to identify with a particular ethnic group and classified them in censuses. European colonists viewed Africans in general as children who needed to be guided, but noted the Tutsi to be the ruling culture in Rwanda-Burundi. In 1959, Belgium reversed its stance and allowed the majority Hutu to assume control of the government through universal elections after independence. This partly reflected internal Belgian domestic politics, who later saw the discrimination against the Hutu majority as similar to oppression within Belgium suffered from the Flemish-Walloon conflict. They saw the democratization and empowerment of the Hutu as a just response to the Tutsi domination. The Belgian policies wavered and flip-flopped considerably during this period leading up to independence of Burundi and Rwanda.

The Hutu majority had revolted against the Tutsi in 1959 and taken power. Tutsis fled and created exile communities outside Rwanda in Uganda and Tanzania. Since Burundi's independence, more extremist Tutsi came to power and oppressed the Hutus, especially those who were educated. Their actions led to the deaths of up to 200,000 Hutus. Overt discrimination from the colonial period was continued by different Rwandan and Burundian governments, including identity cards that distinguished Tutsi and Hutu.

The Belgian-sponsored Tutsi monarchy survived until 1959, when Kigeli V was exiled from the colony (then called Ruanda-Urundi). In Rwanda, the political power was transferred from the minority Tutsi to the majority Hutu.

In Rwanda, a Tutsi rebel group, the Rwandan Patriotic Front, invaded Rwanda from Uganda, which started a civil war against Rwanda's Hutu government in 1990. A peace agreement was signed, but violence erupted again, culminating in the Rwandan Genocide of 1994, when Hutu extremists killed an estimated 800,000 Rwandans, mostly Tutsis. About 30% of the Twa population of Rwanda were also killed.

== Somalia ==
The Somali Bantu ethnic minority face significant stigmatization in Somali society due to their differing physical appearance and ancestry from the Cushitic-origin majority of Somalia. Racialized epithets targeted at the Somali Bantu community exist such as 'adoon' (slave) similar in connotation to the Arabic term abeed. The marginalization of the Somali Bantu community is primarily based on ethnoracial factors, unlike the marginalization of the Madhiban and other Somali-origin minorities which is primarily based on their status as a socially constructed caste. Ethnic Somalis and populations of Bantu stock are genetically divergent. Racially-motivated attacks on Somali Bantus have occurred. Journalists who bring attention to discrimination against Somali Bantus have suffered from death threats and some have fled the country as a result.

The 4.5 parliamentary formula under the Transitional Federal Government has been criticized as a form of legislative apartheid.

== South Africa ==
Racism is still prevalent in South Africa. The end of apartheid might have removed the legal framework allowing institutionalised racism, however, racism in South Africa both predates and encompasses more than just the institutionalised racism of apartheid.

=== Colonialism ===
The establishment of the Dutch East India Company settlement at the Cape of Good Hope in 1652 brought with it the established slave labor practices of the company. Many of these slaves were imported from the company's more established settlements in India and the East Indies.

Slavery in South Africa was officially abolished in 1833 with the Slavery Abolition Act.

There are many examples of racism and discriminatory practices during the colonial period, such as the allocation of rations during the Siege of Ladysmith:

For Whites—Biscuit, 1/4 lb.; Maize meal, 3 oz.

For Indians and Kaffirs—Maize meal, 8 oz.

Europeans—Fresh meat, 1 lb.

Kaffirs—Fresh meat, 1-1/4 lbs. (Chiefly horseflesh.)

For White men—Coffee or tea, 1/12 oz.; pepper, 1/64 oz.; salt, 1/3 oz.; sugar, 1 oz.; mustard, 1/20 oz.; Vinegar, 1/12 gill.

For Indians—a little rice.

— H. W. Nevinson, Ladysmith, The Diary of a Siege

=== Apartheid racism ===
Apartheid (Afrikaans pronunciation: Afrikaans pronunciation: [aˈpartɦɛit]; an Afrikaans word meaning "separateness", or "the state of being apart", literally "apart-hood") was a system of racial segregation in South Africa enforced through legislation by the National Party (NP), the governing party from 1948 to 1994. Under apartheid, the rights, associations, and movements of the majority black inhabitants and other ethnic groups were curtailed, and white minority rule was maintained. Apartheid was developed after World War II by the Afrikaner-dominated National Party and Broederbond organisations. The ideology was also enforced in South West Africa, which was administered by South Africa under a League of Nations mandate (revoked in 1966 via United Nations Resolution 2145), until it gained independence as Namibia in 1990. By extension, the term is currently used for forms of systematic segregation established by the state authority in a country against the social and civil rights of a certain group of citizens due to ethnic prejudices.

== Sudan ==
In the Sudan, black African captives in the civil war were often enslaved, and female prisoners were often abused sexually, with their Arab captors claiming that Islamic law grants them permission. According to CBS News, slaves have been sold for US $50 a piece. In September 2000, the U.S. State Department alleged that "the Sudanese government's support of slavery and its continued military action which has resulted in numerous deaths are due in part to the victims' religious beliefs." Jok Madut Jok, professor of history at Loyola Marymount University, states that the abduction of women and children of the south is slavery by any definition. The government of Sudan insists that the whole matter is no more than the traditional tribal feuding over resources.

The United States government's Sudan Peace Act of October 21, 2002 accused Sudan of genocide in an ongoing civil war which has cost more than 2,000,000 lives and has displaced more than 4,000,000 people since the war started in 1983.

During the Second Sudanese Civil War, people were taken into slavery; estimates of abductions range from 14,000 to 200,000. Abduction of Dinka women and children was common.

In 2004, it became publicly known that there was an organised campaign by Janjaweed militias (nomadic Arab shepherds with the support of Sudanese government troops) to get rid of 80 black African groups from the Darfur region of western Sudan. These peoples include the Fur, Zaghawa and Massalit.

Mukesh Kapila (United Nations humanitarian coordinator) is quoted as saying: "This is more than just a conflict. It is an organised attempt [by Khartoum] to do away with a group of people. The only difference between Rwanda [in 1994] and Darfur now is the numbers of dead, murdered, tortured and raped involved" A July 14, 2007 article noted that in the past two months up to 75,000 Arabs from Chad and Niger crossed the border into Darfur. Most have been relocated by the Sudanese government to former villages of displaced non-Arab people. Some 2.5 million have now been forced to flee their homes after attacks by Sudanese troops and Janjaweed militia.

== Tanzania ==
Black Tanzanians portray Indian Tanzanians as miserly because of their status as a business minority who owns most businesses in Dar es Salaam. Whereas black Tanzanians are seen as lazy thieves and profiteers who have no culinary taste. In Indian-owned service businesses, it is said that black Tanzanians are served last after Indians, Arabs and white people. Black Tanzanians report to be looked down upon by Indians Tanzanians with the same education level, that Indian Tanzanians do not want to intermingle with black Tanzanians nor learn Kiswahili, which they deem to be an inferior language.

== Tunisia ==
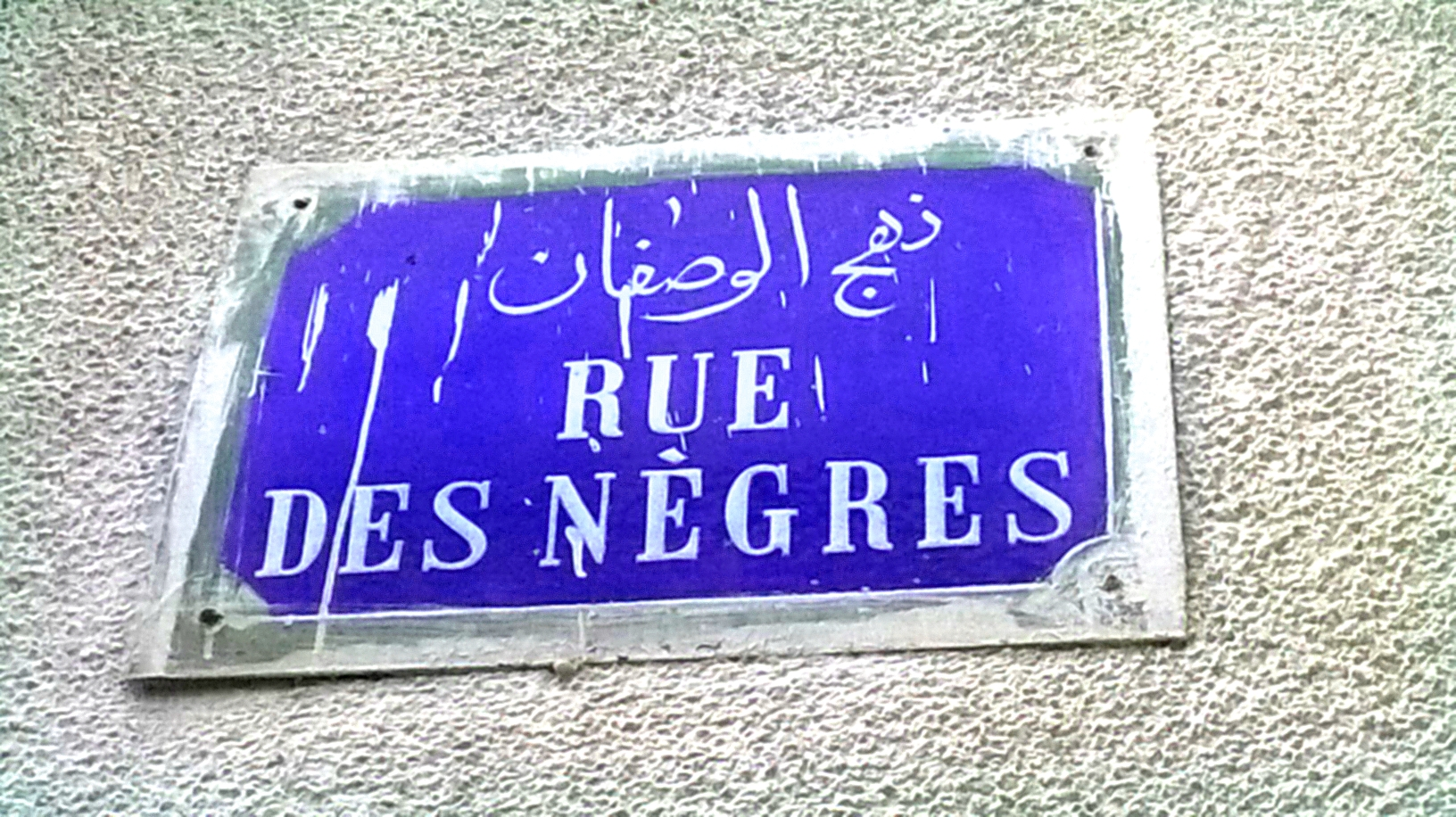
Street plate in Medina of Tunis reading, in Arabic and French, "Negroes street"

In 2018, more than seven years after the fall of the Ben Ali regime, Law 50 was introduced to protect black Tunisians from racial discrimination.

== Uganda ==
Former British colonies in Sub-Saharan Africa have many citizens of South Asian descent. They were brought by the British Empire from British India to do clerical work in imperial service. The most prominent case of anti-Indian racism was the ethnic cleansing of the Indian (called Asian) minority in Uganda by strongman dictator and human rights violator Idi Amin.

The 1968 Committee on "Africanization in Commerce and Industry" in Uganda made far-reaching Indophobic proposals. A system of work permits and trade licenses was introduced in 1969 in order to restrict the role of Indians in economic and professional activities. Indians were segregated and discriminated against in all walks of life. After Amin came to power, he exploited these divisions to spread propaganda against Indians, stereotyping and scapegoating the Indian minority. Indians were stereotyped as "only traders" and so "inbred" to their profession. Indians were attacked as "dukawallas" (an occupational term that degenerated into an anti-Indian slur during Amin's time).

In the 1970s Uganda implemented racist policies that targeted the Asian population of the region. Uganda under Idi Amin's leadership was particularly virulent in its anti-Asian policies. In August 1972, Idi Amin declared what he called an "economic war", a set of policies that included the expropriation of properties owned by Asians and Europeans. Uganda's 80,000 Asians were mostly Indians born in the country, whose ancestors had come to Uganda when the country was still a British colony. Indians were stereotyped as "greedy" and "conniving", without any racial identity or loyalty but "always cheating, conspiring and plotting" to subvert Uganda. Amin used this propaganda to justify a campaign of "de-Indianization", eventually resulting in the expulsion and ethnic cleansing of Uganda's Indian minority. India refused to accept the expelled people. Most of the expelled Indians settled in Britain.

== Zimbabwe ==
Racism in Zimbabwe first started during the colonial era in the 19th century, when immigrating white settlers started to racially discriminate against Black people in the region. White settlers held full citizenship rights, as well as other significant economic and legal advantages over indigenous African people. Racial division would continue under Rhodesian governance, sparking an armed struggle to overthrow white rule led by the Zimbabwe African People's Union (ZAPU) and the Zimbabwe African National Union (ZANU). This conflict culminated in the establishment of the modern state of Zimbabwe. The coalition of African forces was fragile, and the government led by Robert Mugabe and the majority-Shona ZANU committed massacres against Northern Ndebele people in ZAPU strongholds, producing resentment between the African ethnic groups.

Following the end of armed conflict, the white minority in Zimbabwe continued to exert disproportionate control over the economy, owned the majority of arable land in Zimbabwe, and maintained racially segregated social circles. White settlers were protected by generous provisions established by the Lancaster House Agreement, and thus continued to exert significant political and legal control over the African population. Wide disparities existed in access to sports, education and housing. The ZANU-led government did not engage in significant expropriation of white settlers despite promising land reform to the African population, with one white commercial farmer commenting that Mugabe's government in the early 1980s was "the best government for farmers that this country has ever seen". Dissatisfaction with the slow pace of land reform led to the illegal seizing of white-owned land by African peasants. The government responded with heavy-handed repression against the African peasants. Resentment of continued white control of the economy continued through the 1990s, spurred by the perception that the white business community was disinterested in improving the economic lot of the African population or otherwise changing the status quo.

By 2000, as the ZANU-PF government grew political isolated, it increasingly criticized the white population's segregationism and racism, and began to encourage violent farm invasions against the white population, which drew condemnations from the international community. Zimbabwe today continues to be fractured by enmity along racial lines.

== See also ==
- Antisemitism in Africa
- Human rights in Africa
- Racism by country
