= Discrimination in Saudi Arabia =

Racism in Saudi Arabia extends to allegations of imprisonment, physical abuse, rape, murder, overwork, and wage theft, especially of foreign workers who are given little protections under the law.

== Religious-based ==
=== Muslims ===
==== Shia ====
The most prominent religious discrimination in Saudi Arabia is against the Shia sect of Islam minority in the eastern and southern regions of Saudi.

According to a 2009 Human Rights Watch report, Shiite citizens in Saudi Arabia "face systematic discrimination in religion, education, justice, and employment".

==== Non-Wahhabi Sunnis ====
Though the majority of Saudis are Sunni, they still include many non-Wahhabis. These subgroups include different schools of thoughts and jurisprudence such as Hanafi, Maliki and Shafi’i with some also subscribing to Sufism.

Members of non-Wahhabi Sunni subgroups face varying levels of scrutiny and discrimination, including restricted religious freedoms due to the Wahhabi's definition of Sunni Islam along strict lines. Celebration of religious ceremonies such as Mawlid, which is forbidden in Saudi Arabia, is a prime example of that.

=== Non-Muslims ===
Although there is discrimination against non-Muslims (usually Western foreigners, Jews, Christians, etc.) in general this goes unnoticed as these cases are relatively uncommon compared to those of other minorities.

==== Antisemitism ====
In Saudi Arabia, antisemitism is commonplace. Saudi Arabian media often denounces Jews in books, news articles and with what some describe as antisemitic satire. Saudi Arabian government officials and state religious leaders often promote the idea that Jews are conspiring to take over the entire world; as proof of their claims they publish and frequently cite the fictional work, The Protocols of the Elders of Zion as factual.

== Nationality-based ==
=== Foreign workers ===
As of 2025, Saudi Arabia has more than 13 million migrant workers, an estimated 4 million are domestic workers from Africa and Asia. They account accounting for one-third of the Kingdom's population and more than half of its workforce.

The Kafala System

Migrant workers, especially domestic and blue-collar workers, "continued to be bound by the kafala (sponsorship) system." This system restricts workers from changing jobs or leaving the country, placing them under an increased risk of exploitation. While there exists limited labour reforms in Saudi Arabia, workers are still subject to labour abuse, including "wage theft, unsafe working conditions, racial discrimination, and substandard living conditions." Human Rights Watch (HRW) describes the working conditions of foreign workers, most of whom come from developing countries in South Asia, as "near-slavery" and attributes them to "deeply rooted gender, religious, and racial discrimination." Workers are often unwilling to report their employers for fear of losing their jobs or further abuse.

For white-collar workers, discrimination based on nationality exists as well. However, it is limited to workplace treatment, accommodation and job benefits, and salary. Foreign doctors, for example, make up "73 percent of the total medical workforce." However, there is a high turnover rate bearing a cost on the Saudi government. A reason behind this rate is the discrimination faced at the workplace. Doctors of non-Western nationalities, excluding Saudi doctors, are required to have a guarantor - an employee of the hospital who ensures the non-Western doctor will be returning back after their vacation. One doctor of non-Western nationality disapproves of this rule, saying, "It is like they are not trusting you. This is very bad, it takes time [...] Sometimes it is very embarrassing." A Pakistani teacher in Saudi reported being offered SAR 2,500 as her salary compared to the SAR 5,000 Saudi teachers were paid. Upon receiving Canadian citizenship, she was offered a job from an American school with four times her previous salary. Nurses from Canada and the United States received the highest salary category compared to Filipino nurses who received lower wages.

It is important to note the classist and white supremacist undertones in the discrimination seen in Saudi Arabia. White, European, colonial, and imperial nationalities are given priority over those of formerly colonized and primarily Black and Brown populated nationalities. Certain nationalities of white-collar jobs, while still facing discrimination, do not experience the atrocious 'slave-like' conditions of blue-collar workers. This sort of race and class hierarchy is able to persist in Saudi Arabia, without widespread challenge from foreign governments, due to its economic importance as an oil producing and exporting powerhouse, geopolitical alliances, defence relationships, and restrictions on free speech and expression under the Saudi Arabian government.

Instances of Discrimination

In 2019, Saudi Arabia reportedly asked the WWE to remove Sami Zayn from the super showdown event that is taking place in Saudi Arabia due to his Syrian ethnicity.

In 2025, Amnesty International uncovered that migrant workers building Riyadh's new metro system had "endured a decade of exploitation with insufficient government protection." Workers were left working long hours for "low and discriminatory pay" under the Saudi Arabian heat. Hundreds were unpaid for months, while some for nearly a year, with no social benefits to pay for basic livelihood needs such as food. When some protested and shared their situation on social media, the Saudi government detained 11 workers for approximately 48 hours in September according to a trade union.

Kenyan women hired as domestic workers report abusive conditions resulting in labour and human trafficking involving unpaid wages, physical and sexual assault, and excessive working hours.

== Tribal-based ==
=== Intra-tribal ===
In the Arabian peninsula generally the tribe (qabila) refers not only to a blood relation but also to a social status. Tribal (qabili or asil) people assign themselves into inferior and superior tribes that assume purity in blood and root (asl). This form of discrimination has roots in the vicious tribal wars and conflicts which predated Saudi Arabia and Islam.

Matrimony between individuals of qabila and khadiri stock, and between individuals of superior and inferior tribes, is frowned upon. This is because qabili status itself depends on purity of paternal lineage. Children of mixed marriages would carry mixed blood which would reflect on the position of the tribe as a whole.

Favoritism of one's own tribe to others in many matters, including those in which it is prohibited to do so such as in governmental affairs, is common.

=== Khadiri ===
In Najd region, all freeborn citizens who cannot claim tribal descent are unofficially called non-asil or Khadiri. This group included many of the urban tradesmen, artisans, merchants, and scholars of pre-oil Arabia. Historically, rule in Najd villages towns, and larger politics was regularly held by the tribal (asil) groups while Khadiri people generally were held to an inferior social status.

Intermarrying with Khadiri can lead to an asil and resulting progeny losing their designation.

Descendants of slaves (abid) from the period of slavery in Saudi Arabia are often considered Khadiri even if some have the name of tribes. This is because slaves used to take the name of the people they were serving. Use of the term abid is considered an insult.

Divorce cases

Many cases of marriage annulment because of the interference of the wife's family who tends to be from tribal affiliation, with their reasoning being that has husband of an "Unequal lineage" because he is of non-Arab origin or he is from an unknown or lesser known tribe, many marriage annulments happened by force by the bride's family or even legally by law.

=== Hejazi Hadar ===
Hejazi Hadar are Saudi citizens of non-tribal, non-Bedouin origins in the urban areas of Hejaz region, colloquially called Hadar (city-dwellers). These include multi-ethnic citizens from Medina and Taif in the Hejaz area, and from Jeddah, Mecca, and Yanbu in the Hejazi part of the Tihamah. The Hadar in these places are known by their distinctive dialect yet contrasting physical features. Their diversity is largely due to their ancestors migration to Hejaz, cradle of Islam, from all over the world prior or in the early days of the Saudi reign.

Saudi Bedouins call Saudis of non-Bedouin origins "Sea Refuse" (Tarsh Bahar), a derogatory term largely used for Hejazi Hadar that dates back to the fall of the kingdom of Hejaz. "Pilgrims’ remains" (bagaya hujjaj) is another phrase used unflatteringly.

Hejazi Hadar, on the other hand, consider themselves more sophisticated and civilized, while the Bedouin population see themselves as racially pure. Hejazi Hadar sometimes answer back by calling Bedouins Soroob, meaning backward or savage people. However, the term Badawi, singular form of Bedouin, is sometimes used on its own to disparagingly mean a provincial, naive, and unsophisticated person.

Hejazi Hadar, as a minority, face many forms of formal and informal discrimination. Employment discrimination is one of those where they are underrepresented in leadership and government positions and are not usually allowed into the military services, with exceptions. Social discrimination in marriages also exist on both sides.

Religious discrimination also exists. Though the majority of Hejazi Hadar are Sunni, they, unlike the majority of Bedouin, belong to a variety of Islamic schools of jurisprudence like Sufism. All those who don't consider themselves Wahhabis face discrimination for that as well.

==== Notable incidents ====
Following Hamza Kashgari's controversial messages, racist comments in reference to his Turkmen family background were made against him on Twitter as "[not being] enough of a 'pure' Saudi".

== Racism in media ==
Racism or Tribalism of any kind is prohibited in Saudi media. Violators are punished and may be banned from media platforms. Recently King Salman's nephew was banned from media after referring to an individual as "tarsh bahar" during a call to a sports program.
