= Peacock Princess =

Tai legend

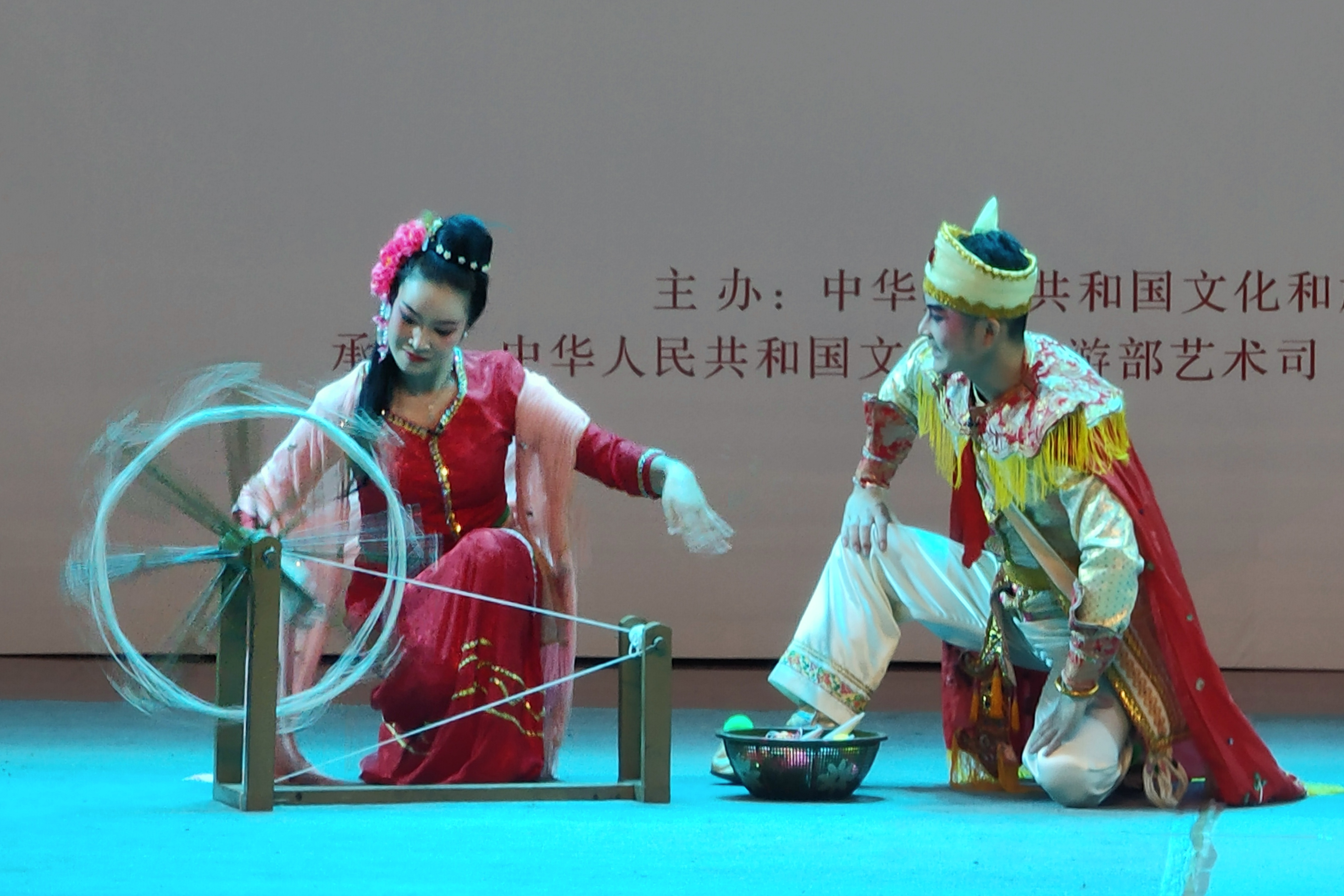
- A music play of Chao Sisouthone and Nang Manola.

Folk tale
- Name: Peacock Princess
- Mythology: Hinduism; Tai peoples
- Region: Southeast Asia; South China Craton
- Origin Date: Middle Ages
- Published in: 1960
- Related: Manimekhala

The Peacock Princess, Peacock Maiden or Chao Sisouthone and Nang Manola is a Tai legend and directly related to agricultural culture. This story also is related to the tale of Manohara and similar parallels in the folklore of Myanmar, Cambodia, Thailand, Laos, Sri Lanka, northern Malaysia, Indonesia, Vietnam and China. It is also compared to the international narrative of the Swan Maiden.

== History ==
The tale originated within the people of the Dai ethnic group who worshiped peacocks. The Dai people worship peacocks as being messengers of peace, kindness, love and beauty.

The Pannasjataka, a Pali text written by a Buddhist monk/sage in Chiangmai around AD 1450-1470, also told the story of Sudhana and Manohara from ancient India. There are also many similar versions told in China (where it is known as Chinese: 悅意; pinyin: Yuèyì), Japan, Korea, and Vietnam, including the Chinese story of the Princess and the Cowherd. In these stories, seven women who can fly descended to earth to take a bath, the youngest and prettiest of whom was captured by a human, and subsequently became a wife of a male human (either her captor or the prince-hero of the story). Later in the stories, the heroine put on some magical thing that enabled her to fly or transform into a bird, and flew away; prompting the quest by the hero in pursuit of his flying wife.

=== Plot ===
Typically referred to as Princess Manohara and Prince Sudhana (Khmer: ព្រះសុធននាងកែវមនោរាហ៍), the legend appears in the Divyavadana and is documented by stone reliefs at Borobodur.

The story is about a young prince who falls in love with and marries the peacock princess. On their wedding night, the evil wizard puts a spell on the king and starts a war. The young prince leaves for battle and while he is gone, his princess is sentenced to death by the king. Before she is killed, she takes on peacock form and escapes. When the prince returns, he kills the evil wizard and releases the king from the spell. Everyone lives happily ever after.

Manohara, the youngest of seven daughters of the Kinnara king, lives on Mount Kailash. One day, she travels to the human realm. She is caught by a hunter (using a magic noose in some versions) who gives her to Prince Sudhana. Son of King Adityavamsa and Queen Chandradevi, Sudhana is a renowned archer and heir to the Panchala kingdom. The prince falls in love with Manohara, and they get married.

Later, when the prince is away in battle, Manohara is accused by the royal counselor of bringing bad luck to the city and is threatened with death. She flies away, back to the Kinnara kingdom. She leaves behind a ring and the directions to reach the Kinnara kingdom so that Prince Sudhana can follow her.

Prince Sudhana returns to Panchala and follows her. From a hermit, he learns the language of animals to locate the Kinnara kingdom, and the necessary prayers to win back the princess. The journey takes seven years, seven months, and seven days. Along the way, Sudhana confronts a Yaksha (ogre), a river of flames, and a gigantic tree. After the long and arduous ordeal, he meets the Kimnara king who asks the prince to prove his sincerity with various tests assessing strength, perseverance, and wit. In the first test, Sudhana is made to lift a stone bench in the garden. The second task tested his skill with the bow and arrow. The final test is to identify which of seven identical women is Manohara, who he recognizes by the ring on her finger. Satisfied, the Kinnara king consents to their marriage and the couple returns to Panchala.

Ngày xưa, ở nước Lào có một hoàng tử tên là Phonnavong, rất đẹp trai, tài giỏi và có đạo đức. Vua và hoàng hậu rất yêu quý.
Em là Kinnari, con gái út vua nước Champa; Còn tôi là Phonnavong con trai vua nước Lào. Gặp nhau đây âu cũng là duyên trời, tôi muốn cùng nàng kết nghĩa vợ chồng. Chẳng hay nàng có vui lòng không ?
Ở nước Champa có tục lệ ai bị xử tội chết đều được mặc áo lông công múa hát chúc phúc cho mọi người ở lại. Xin phụ vương ban ơn cho con được theo tục lệ đó.
Hôm bước lên giàn thiêu, Kinnari mặc áo lông công lộng lẫy múa điệu Lào Phên chúc phúc cho mọi người và nói lên nỗi oan ức của mình. Điệu múa uyển chuyển và giọng hát du dương làm cho người xem ai cũng mê say và xúc động. Bất thình lình, thuận đà, nàng vỗ cánh vút lên cao, nhắm hướng nước Champa bay thẳng.

— Stories for the Grade 3rd, Education publishing, Hanoi, 1995

=== Etymology ===
Figures	India	Kampouchea	Laos	Siam	China	Korea	Annam
Peacock Princess	Manohara	Neang Kev Monorea នាងកែវមនោរាហ៍	Nang Manola	Manohara มโนราห์	Náng Mùchuònà 娘穆婼娜	Arang 아랑	Nhồi Hoa
The Prince	Sudhana	Preah Sothun ព្រះសុធន	Chao Sisouthone	Prince Sudhana พระสุธน	Zhào Shùtún 召樹屯	Mudal 무달	Lê Tư Thành
The Hunter	Halaka	?	?	Boon the Hunter พรานบุญ	Yánkǎn 岩坎	?	Tiều phu
The Wizard	Brahmin ब्राह्मण	Brahmin ព្រាហ្មណ៍	Brahmin	Brahmin พราหมณ์	Yayan the Wizard 羅門巫師	?	Tể tướng
Water God	Nagaraja नागराज	Reachnahka ណាហ្គារាជ	?	Nagaraja พญานาคราช	Lóngwáng 龍王	Yongwang 용왕	Hà bá
Seven kinnari princesses	Kinnaur किन्नर	Kenorei កិន្នរី	?	Kinrī กินรี	Xiānnǚ 小仙女	Seonyeo 선여	Tiên nữ
The King	Adityavamsa	Atichakvong	?	Adityavamsa ท้าวอาทิตยวงศ์	?	?	?
The Queen	Chandradevi	Chantea Devi	?	Chandradevi มเหสีจันทาเทวี	?	?	?
Sites	India	Kampouchea	Laos	Siam	China	Korea	Annam
Earth	Pañcāla पञ्चाल	Oudor Bangchal	Mɯ́ang Bangchal	Panchala นครอุดรปัญจาล	Měng Bǎnzhā 勐板扎	The village	An Nam
Central Plains	Ocean	Lake	River	River	Heavenly lake 天池	Heavenly lake 천지	River
Heaven	Mount Kailash कैलास	Phnom Preah Someru ភ្នំព្រះសុមេរុ	Champa	Mount Kailash เขาไกลาส	Heavenly kingdom 天國	Enchanted mountain 금강산	Champa

== Culture ==
=== Adaptations ===
The tale of Manora was adapted as play in Burma (Myanmar), where the character was known as Mananhurry, one of the nine royal daughters that live in a silver mountain, located after "a belt of prickly cane", "a stream of liquid copper" and a "Beloo". Her future husband, Prince Sudhana, was translated as "Thoodanoo", the Prince of Pyentsa. In this version, the princesses fly by the use of an enchanted girdle, and the Manohara-like maiden is captured by a magical slipknot.

The characters of the tale are also known in Southeast Asia as Kev Monorea and Preah Sothun.

The tale was also found in the Sanskrit Buddhist literature of Nepal, with the name Story of Suchandrima and a Kinnarí, where the main couple were named Mahonará and Sudhanusha. In another version from Nepal, Kinnarí Avadána, hunter Utpala captures a Kinnari (unnamed in the tale) with a magical noose. Prince Sudhana of Hastiná arrives with his hunting excursion and falls in love with the Kinnari.

Another translation named the prince as Sudhanu and the kinnari as Manohara, daughter of King Druma.

=== Legacy ===
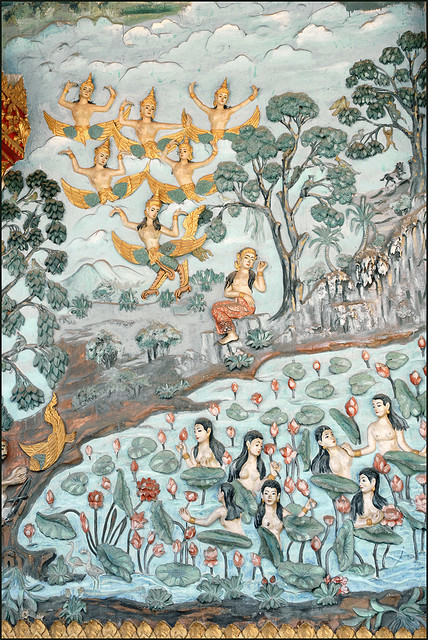
Legend of Chao Sisouthone and Nang Manola at Vat That Luang, Luang Prabang.

According to James R. Brandon, the story of Princess Manohara and Prince Sudhana is a popular theme in Southeast Asian theatre. It may have inspired the Manora type of drama dancing, performed in Thailand and Malaysia.

The Mayilattam (மயிலாட்டம்) is an artistic and religious form of dance performed in the Hindu temples of Tamil Nadu and Kerala in reverence to Lord Subrahmanya. Mayilattam performers wear costumes from head to toe like peacock with beak, that can be opened and closed using a thread, and perform specific dances. The performers dance on a tall piece of wood attached at the end of their feet. This art requires extensive training and practise. This dance is performed in all Murugan (Lord Subrahmanya) temples as a tradition during festivals. But due to the difficulties in practise and less amount of wages for the dancers, the number of Mayilattam performers is decreasing.

The peacock dance or peafowl dance is a traditional Asian folk dance that describes the beauty and the movement of peacocks. There are several peacock dance traditions developed in Asia, among others are peacock dances of Myanmar, and in the western and northern parts of Cambodia, West Java in Indonesia, also peacock dances of Indian subcontinent in Southern India, Sri Lanka, and Bangladesh. In Indonesia it is known as the peafowl dance (Merak dance or Tari Merak) and originated in West Java. It is performed by female dancers inspired by the movements of a peacock and its feathers blended with the classical movements of Sundanese dance. its one of new creation dance composed by Sundanese artist and choreographer Raden Tjeje Soemantri around the 1950s. This dance performed to welcoming honourable guest in a big event also occasionally performed in Sundanese wedding ceremony. This dance also one of Indonesian dance performed in many international events, such as in Perahara festivals in Sri Lanka.

Besides, Robam Moni Mekhala (Khmer: របាំមុនីមេខលា, also known as Robam Mekhala-Reamesor) is a Khmer classical dance that portrays the story of Moni Mekhala and Reamesor. It is part of the buong suong dance suite that is among the most sacred of Khmer classical dances, serving a ceremonial purpose to invoke rain upon the land. In Thailand, the Mekkhala–Ramasun dance was performed as a boek rong ('prelude dance') introduction before main performances of lakhon nai or khon dances.

The legend was made into a Chinese film in 1963 and 1982 with the same title.

== See also ==
- Manimekhala
- Mayilattam
- Swan maiden
- The blue bird
- Finist the Falcon
