= Lakhon nok =

Thai theater genre

Lakhon nok (Thai: ละครนอก, pronounced [lā.kʰɔ̄ːn nɔ̂ːk]) is a genre of theatre originating from the Ayutthaya era. It was based on the folk performances, similar to lakhon chatri, from what is now Southern Thailand.
