= Manohara =

Asian mythological figure

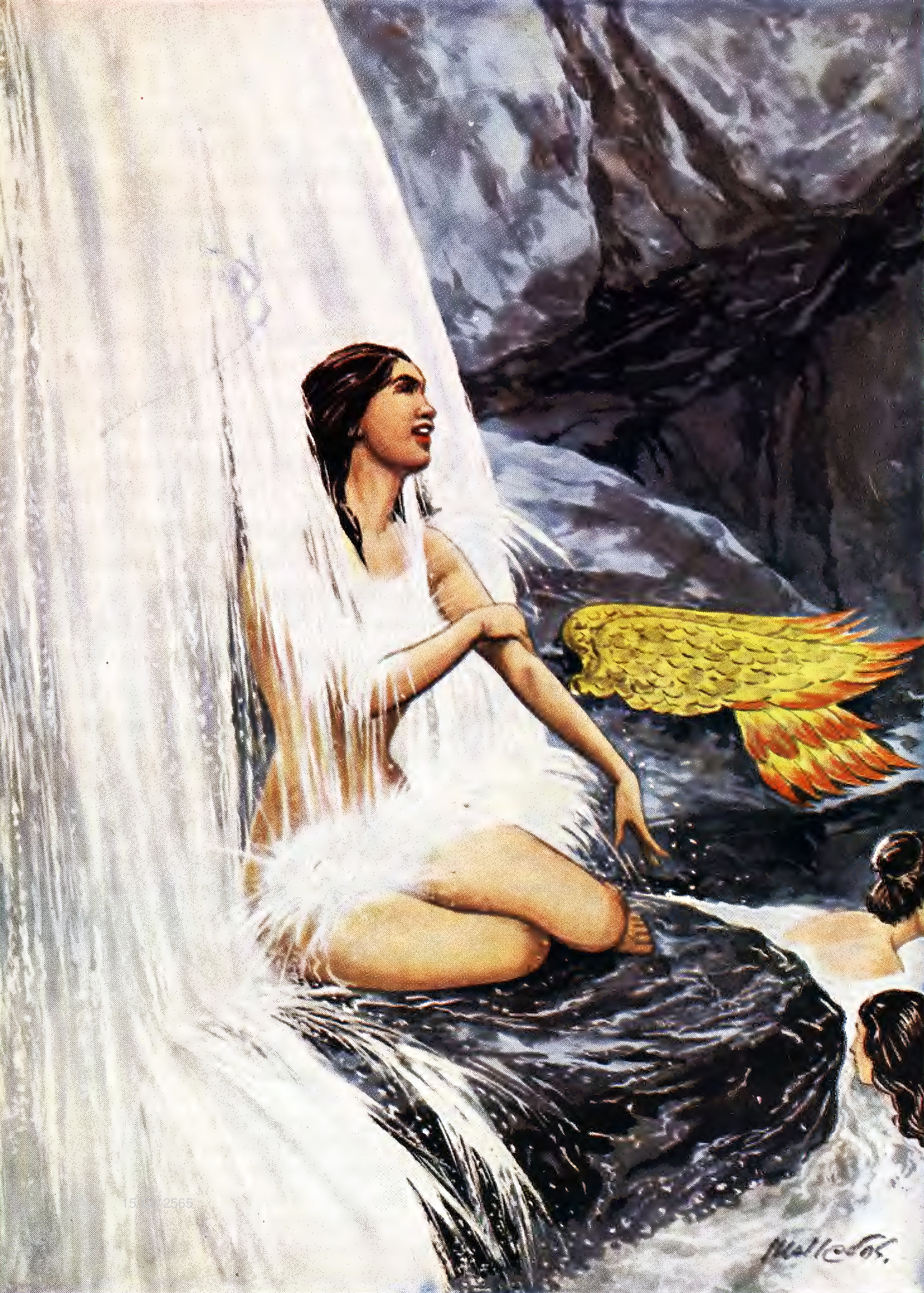
Manohara as depicted in Phap Nang Ngam Nai Wannakhadi ("Illustrations of Ladies in Literature"), an illustrated book by Thai artist Hem Vejakorn.

Manoharā (Pali: "captivating", "heart-stealing") or Manoharī is the kinnari (half-woman, half-bird) heroine of one of the Jataka tales. Typically referred to as Manohara and Prince Sudhana, the legend appears in the Paññāsa Jātaka, Divyavadana and is documented by stone reliefs at Borobodur. Versions of the story are reported in the literature of Southeast Asian countries, and similar stories about a bird maiden and a mortal man can also be found in East Asia and other parts of the world.

== Synopsis ==
Manohara, the youngest of seven daughters of the Kimnara king, lives on Mount Kailash. One day, she travels to the human realm. She is caught by a hunter (using a magic noose in some versions) who gives her to Prince Sudhana. Son of King Adityavamsa and Queen Chandradevi, Sudhana is a renowned archer and heir to the Panchala kingdom. The prince falls in love with Manohara, and they get married.

Later, when the prince is away in battle, Manohara is accused by the royal counselor of bringing bad luck to the city and is threatened with death. She flies away, back to the Kimnara kingdom. She leaves behind a ring and the directions to reach the Kimnara kingdom so that Prince Sudhana can follow her.

Prince Sudhana returns to Panchala and follows her. From a hermit, he learns the language of animals to locate the Kimnara kingdom, and the necessary prayers to win back the princess. The journey takes seven years, seven months, and seven days. Along the way, Sudhana confronts a Yaksha (ogre), a river of flames, and a gigantic tree. After the long and arduous ordeal, he meets the Kimnara king who asks the prince to prove his sincerity with various tests assessing strength, perseverance, and wit. In the first test, Sudhana is made to lift a stone bench in the garden. The second task tested his skill with the bow and arrow. The final test is to identify which of seven identical women is Manohara, who he recognizes by the ring on her finger. Satisfied, the Kimnara king consents to their marriage and the couple returns to Panchala.

== Distribution ==
This story features in the folklore of Myanmar, Cambodia, Thailand, Laos, Sri Lanka, northern Malaysia and Indonesia. The tale has also spread to China, Kucha, Khotan, Java, Tibet, and Bengal.

The Paññāsa Jātakas, a Pali text written by a Buddhist monk/sage in Chiangmai around CE 1450–1470, also told the story of Sudhana and Manohara. There are also many similar versions told in China (where it is known as Chinese: 悅意; pinyin: Yuèyì), Japan, Korea, and Vietnam, including the Chinese story of the Princess and the Cowherd. In these stories, seven women who can fly descended to earth to take a bath, the youngest and prettiest of whom was captured by a human, and subsequently became a wife of a male human (either her captor or the prince-hero of the story). Later in the stories, the heroine put on some magical thing that enabled her to fly or transform into a bird, and flew away; prompting the quest by the hero in pursuit of his flying wife.

== Adaptations ==
=== Theatre ===
According to James R. Brandon, the story of Manohara is a popular theme in Southeast Asian theatre.

The tale of Manohara was adapted as play in Thailand and Burma (Myanmar), where the character was known as Manora or "Dwey Meh Naw" (Burmese: ဒွေးမယ်နော်, lit. 'youngest sis Manō'). She is the youngest of the nine royal daughters that live in a silver mountain, located after "a belt of prickly cane", "a stream of liquid copper" and a guardian "Beloo"(Yaksha). Her future husband, Prince Sudhanu (Pali: "Golden Bow") was prince of Panchala (sometimes said to be from Ayodhya or Ayutthaya. In this version, the maidens fly by the use of enchanted girdles and Manohara is captured by a magical dragon-noose.

=== Literature ===
The characters of the tale are also known in Southeast Asia as Kev Monora, Preah Sothon ,Nang Manora and Phra Suthon.

The tale was also found in the Sanskrit Buddhist literature of Nepal, with the name Story of Suchandrima and a Kinnarí, where the main couple were named Mahonará and Sudhanusha. In another version from Nepal, Kinnarí Avadána, hunter Utpala captures a Kinnari (unnamed in the tale) with a magical noose. Prince Sudhana of Hastiná arrives with his hunting excursion and falls in love with the Kinnari.

Another translation named the prince as Sudhanu and the kinnari as Manohara, daughter of King Druma.

The tale is also known as Sithon and Manola in Laos.

== Legacy ==
The story of Manohara and Prince Sudhana may have inspired the Manora type of drama dancing, performed in Thailand and Malaysia.

== See also ==
- Swan maiden
- Kinnari
- Hagoromo (play)
- The Princess and the Cowherd
- Peacock Princess
- Menora, a dance-drama from Southeast Asia

== Bibliography ==
- Jaini, Padmanabh S. (1966). "The Story of Sudhana and Manoharā: An Analysis of the Texts and the Borobudur Reliefs". Bulletin of the School of Oriental and African Studies, University of London. 29 (3): 533–558. doi:10.1017/S0041977X00073407. JSTOR 611473. S2CID 190756276.
- Toshiharu, Yoshikawa (1984). A Comparative Study of the Thai, Sanskrit, and Chinese Swan Maiden (PDF). International Conference on Thai Studies. Chulalongkorn University. pp. 197–213.

Available translations

- Haribhatta (2017). "SUDHANA AND THE FAIRY PRINCESS. As Prince Sudhana, the Bodhisattva undergoes many trials to be reunited with his fairy wife". Once a Peacock, Once an Actress: Twenty-Four Lives of the Bodhisattva from Haribhatta's "Jatakamala". Translated by Khoroche, Peter. Chicago: University of Chicago Press. pp. 147–175. doi:10.7208/9780226486017-021 (inactive 12 July 2025).
- Schiefner, Anton; Ralston, William Shedden. Tibetan tales, derived from Indian sources. London, K. Paul, Trench, Trübner & co. ltd. 1906. pp. xlviii-l and 44–74.
- Tatelman, Joel (2005). "The Story of Prince Sudhana". Heavenly Exploits: Buddhist Biographies from the Dívyavadána. New York University Press. pp. 219–308. ISBN 978-0-8147-8288-0.
- "Sudhana and the Kinnara Maiden". Leaves of the heaven tree: the great compassion of the Buddha. Translated by Deborah Black. Dharma Publishing. 1997. pp. 298–313. ISBN 0-89800-283-4.
