= Lakhon chatri =

Central Thai dance-drama genre

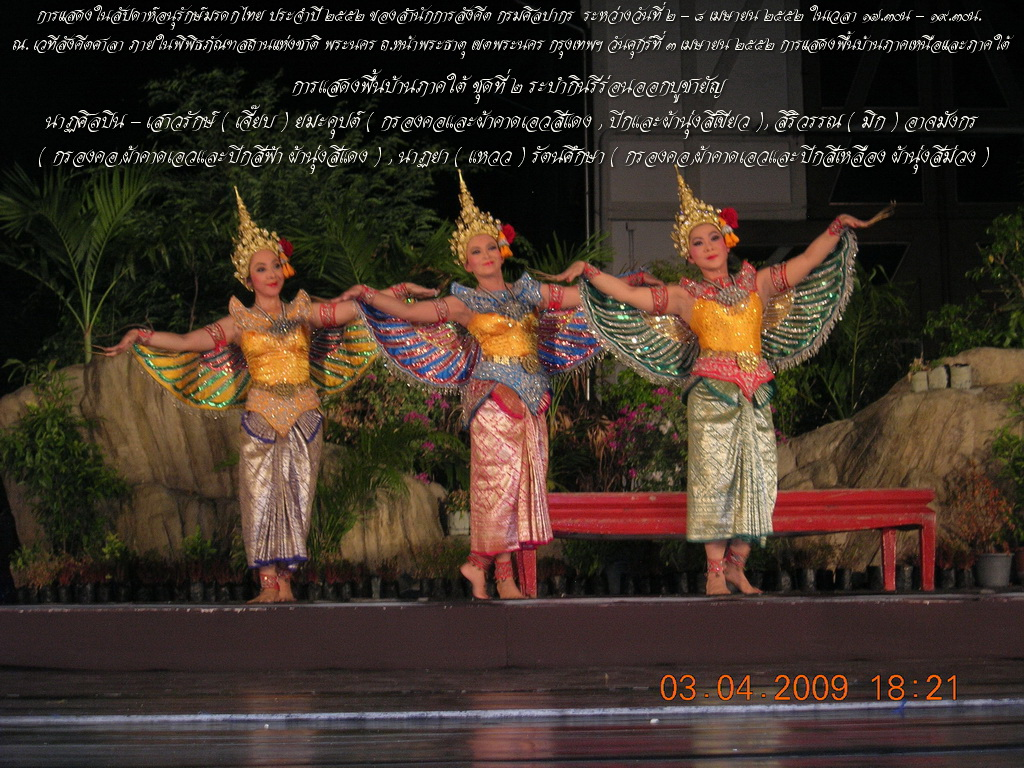
A dance excerpt from the story of Manohara as performed in lakhon chatri.

Lakhon chatri (Thai: ละครชาตรี, pronounced [lā.kʰɔ̄ːn t͡ɕʰāː.trīː]) is a genre of dance-drama from Central Thailand and is closely related to the Nora of Southern Thailand. The word "chatri" has been derived from Sanskrit "kshatriya" which means a member of the Hindu royal and warrior class above Vaisyas and below the Brahmans. Lakhon Chatri presents the story of the kings.

== History ==
Most Thai cultural historians agree that the Lakhon Chatri, defined by women who speak their lines with a lively musical accompaniment, and which features slightly off-color humor and rapid, animated movements, is the oldest surviving form. Lakhon Chatri was popular in the Southern region of Thailand before it was introduced to Bangkok in three periods.

1769 was the first time when King Taksin of Thonburi along with his army took power over several people including the Lakhon Chatri troupe from Nakhon Si Thammarat (southern region of Thailand) after having suppressed the ruler.

In 1780, King Taksin commanded the troupes to perform Lakhon Chatri in competition with the royal court's dance drama troupe during the celebration of the Emerald Buddha statue.

During the reign of King Rama the third in 1832, Somdet Chao Phraya Borom Maha Prayurawong (Dit Bunnag) with his army, suppressed an uprising in the southern region and brought along with him several talented performers of Lakhon Chatri. Who formed a performing group together that became famous and the genre continued to be passed on to younger generations until today.

== Characteristics of Lakhon Chatri ==
In the past, Lakhon Chatri troupe comprised an all-male cast. This performing art is also similar to Lakhon Nok.

== Performance area ==
Having a square shaped area, the troupes set up four poles in four corners with one bench in the square. The pole in the middle is called Sao Mahachai (great victory pole). Also there is a roof above the performance area. There is a low stool which is placed in the middle of the covered space.

== Costumes ==
The troupes perform shirtless. The main character wears more refined costumes than other characters. Sanap phlao (calf length trousers) is used. The decorative cloth strips include hoi na (hanging from the front) and hoi khang (hanging from the side). Other decorative accessories are the Sangwan (jewels sashes), thap suag (a pendant), krong kho (an embroidered collar) and a soet (a pointed crown-like headdress).

== Performance ==
Before the performance begins, the performers perform their rites to pay respect to the teachers and past masters. Followed by Hom Rong Chatti (Chatri's overture) by the Pi Phat orchestra, Rong Prakat Na Bot, Ram Sat Na Bot (Sat Na Bot dance) to the music by the main character who dances in an anti-clockwise circle. The main character would chant an incantation, a spell, while dancing in a bid to invoke protections from the evil. The story begins as the main character sits on the bench. From this point onwards the main character begins to sing while other characters in the story sing the chorus. When the performance finishes, the main character performs a Sat dance again, but this time he chants the incantation backwards and moves in a clockwise circle, called Khlai Yan ("undoing the spell"), to undo the spell.
