= Peacock dance =

Traditional Asian folk dance

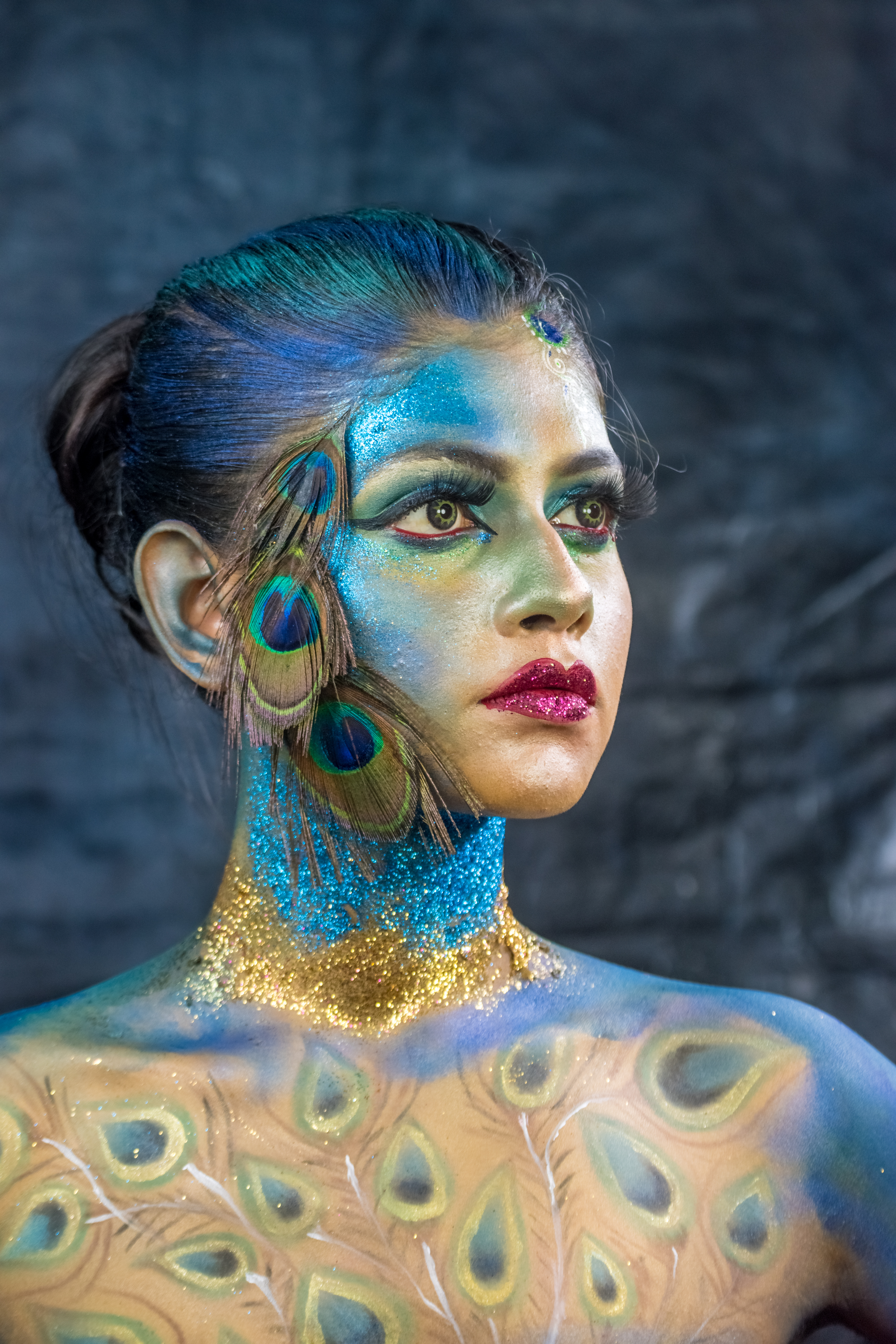
- Indian peacock dancer
- Genre: Folk dance
- Origin: South Asia, Southeast Asia, and East Asia

The peacock dance or peafowl dance is a traditional Asian folk dance that describes the beauty and the movement of peacocks. There are several peacock dance traditions developed in Asia, including the peacock dances of Myanmar, of the western and northern parts of Cambodia, of West Java in Indonesia, and of the Indian subcontinent in Southern India, Sri Lanka, Bangladesh, and the Yunnan region of China

== China ==
Peacock as a totem of the Dai people in the southwestern Chinese province Yunnan, one of the 56 ethnic groups in China, is an essential part of the cultural and spiritual aspects of the Dai people. The peacock dance as the most famous and traditional performance dance among the folk dances of the Dai people is prevalent in Ruili, Luxi located in Dehong Dai and Jingpo Autonomous Prefecture, Mengding, Mengda, Jinggu Dai and Yi Autonomous County, Cangyuan Va Autonomous County and other inhabitation regions of the Dai People.

The peacock dance of the Dai ethnic group has a very long history and is closely tied to their distinguished ethnic culture. Any festival occasion or celebration, such as the annual Water Festival and the Gate Closing / Opening Festival, is accompanied by the peacock dance to express joy and happiness.

In general, there are two types of the traditional peacock dance of the Dai ethnic group in China. One is the peacock dance, which involves wearing a heavy stand made of bamboo, silk, and other materials that imitate the stretching feathers of a peacock. One single stand can weigh up to 20 kilos and will be attached to the back and waist of the performer. The other is the "unarmed peacock dance", in which the performers do not need to carry a heavy stand. Elephant-foot drums, gongs, and cymbals are the usual accompanying instruments for the peacock dance.

== India ==
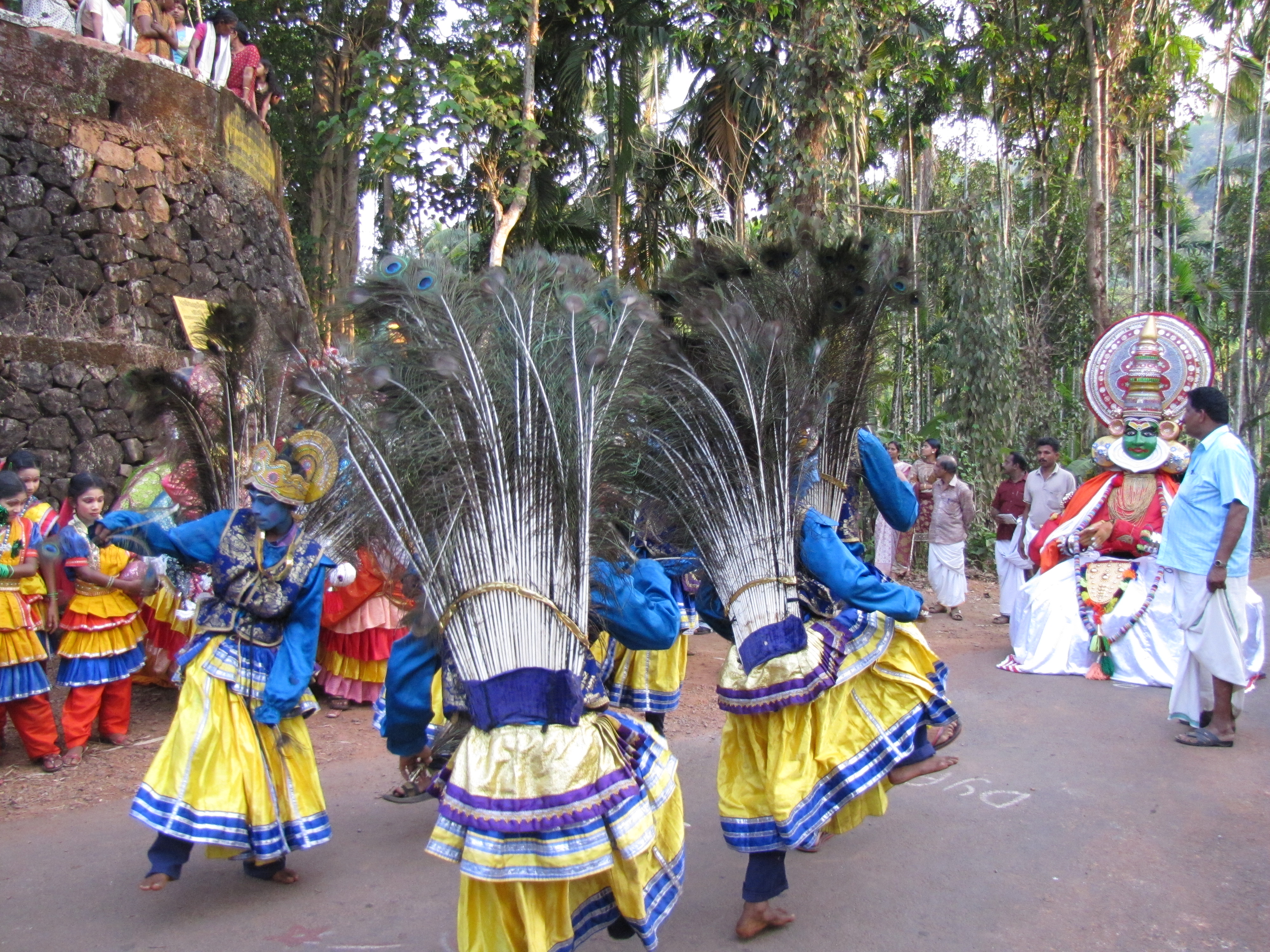
Mayilattam dance at Koovery, Kerala

The mayilattam (Tamil: மயிலாட்டம்), also known as peacock dance, is performed by girls dressed as peacocks during the harvest festival of Thai Pongal in the Indian states of Tamil Nadu and Kerala.

== Indonesia ==
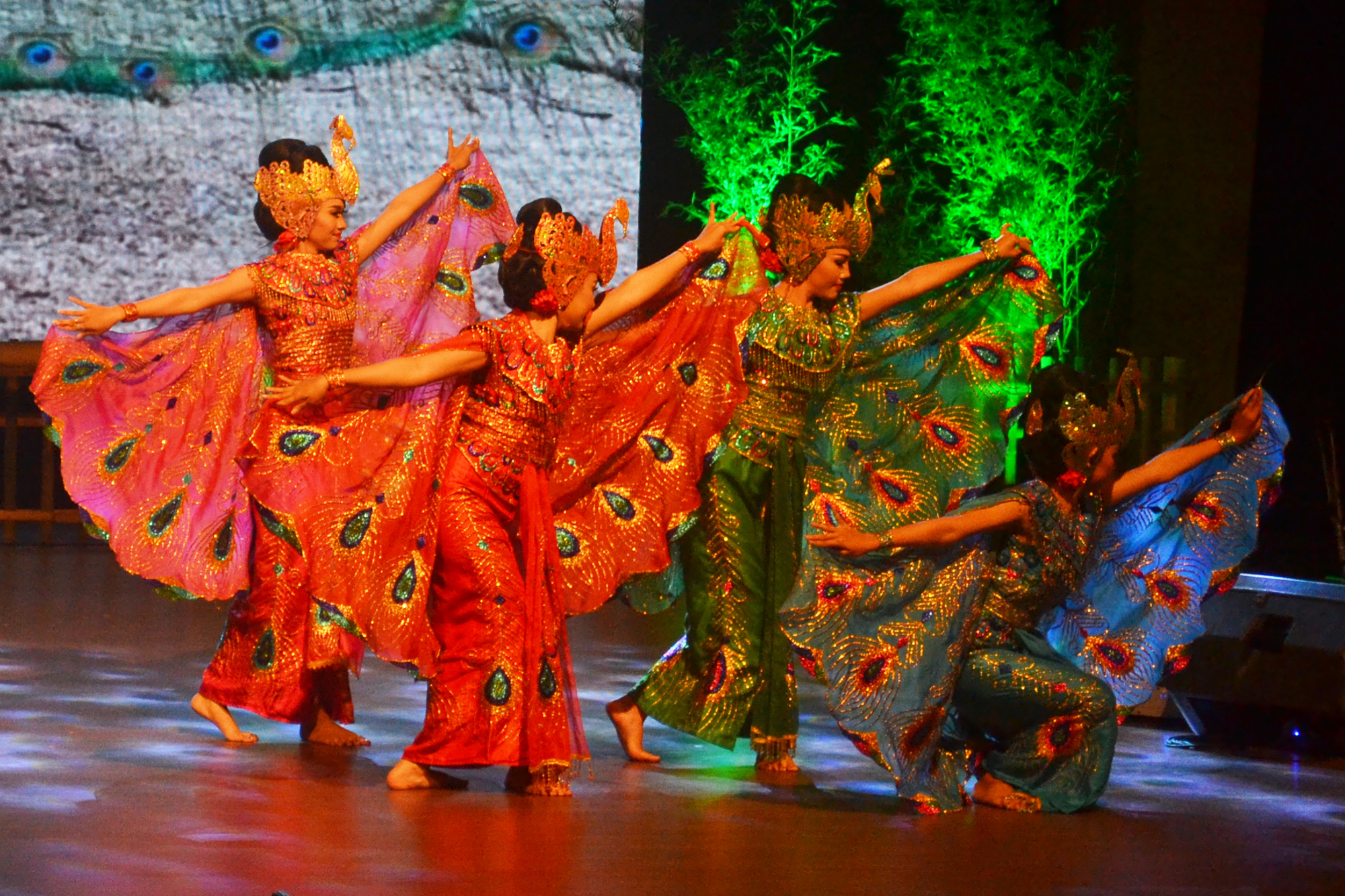
Sundanese peacock dance, West Java, Indonesia

In Indonesia it is known as the peafowl dance (Merak dance or Tari Merak) and originated in West Java. It is performed by female dancers inspired by the movements of a peacock and its feathers, blended with the classical movements of Sundanese dance. its one of the new creation dances composed by Sundanese artist and choreographer Raden Tjeje Soemantri around the 1950s. This dance is performed to welcome honourable guests in a big event also occasionally performed in Sundanese wedding ceremonies. This dance is also one of Indonesia's dances performed in many international events, such as in Perahara festivals in Sri Lanka.

== Gallery ==
Peacock dances

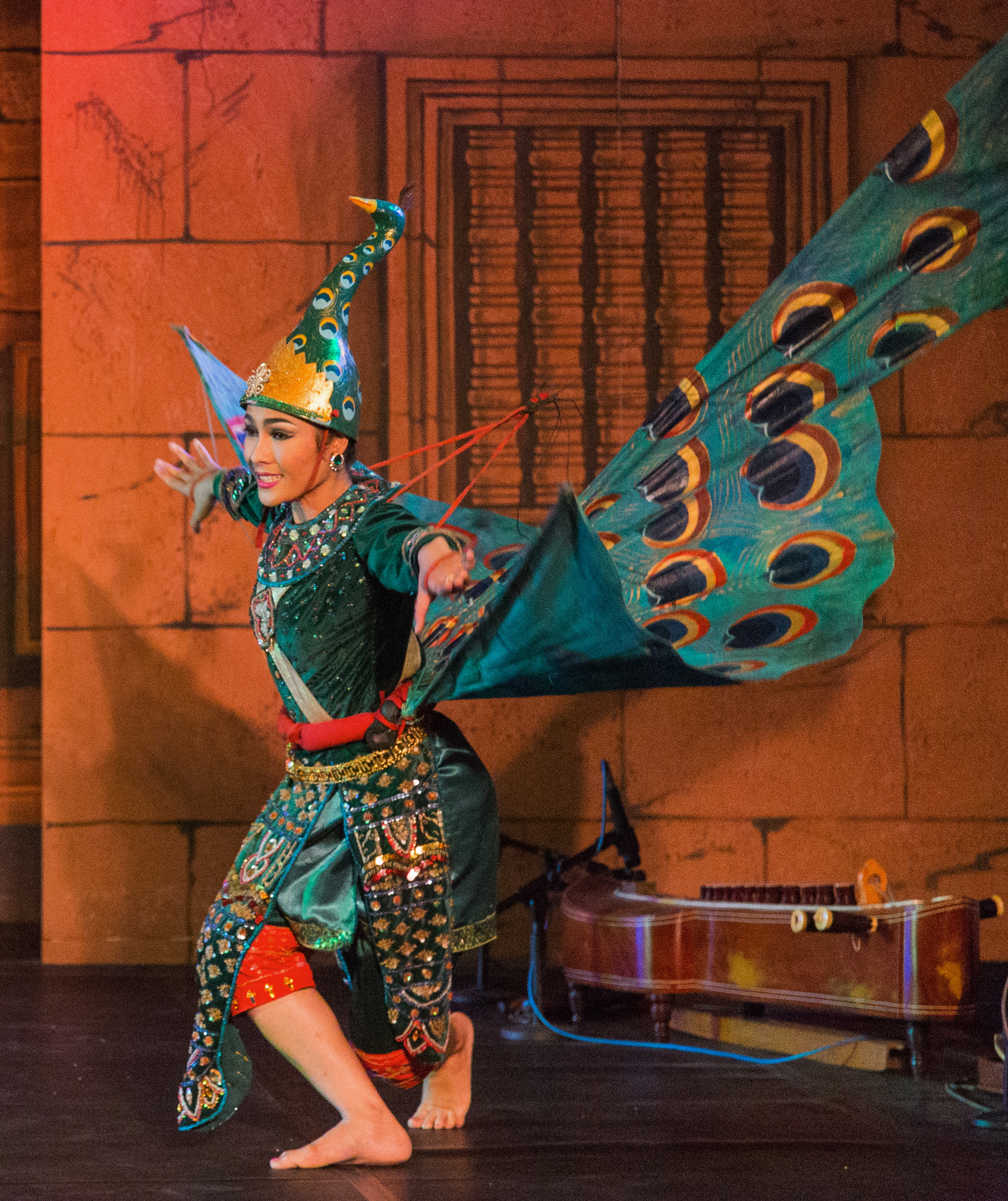
Cambodian peacock dance

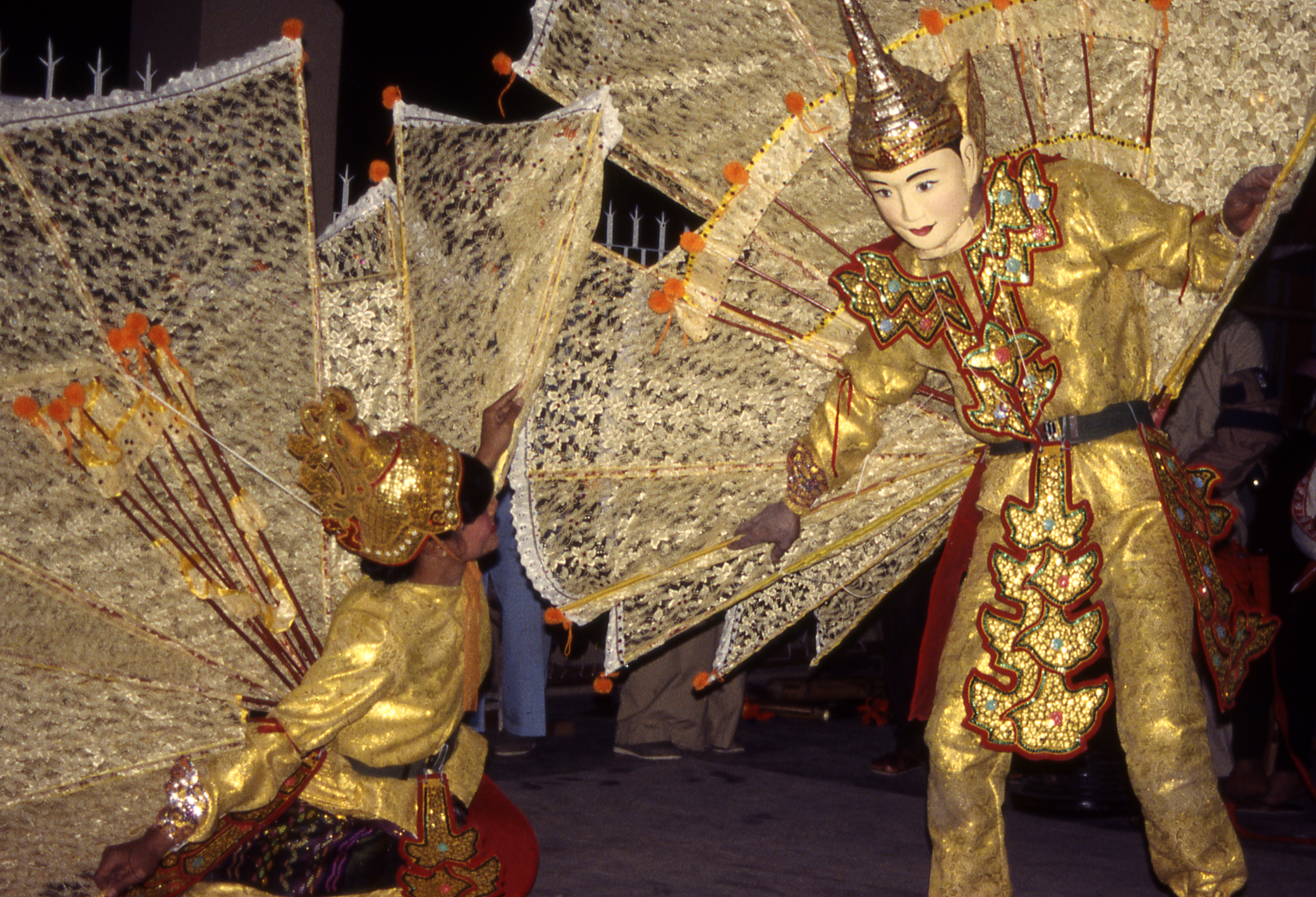
Shan peacock dance in Myanmar

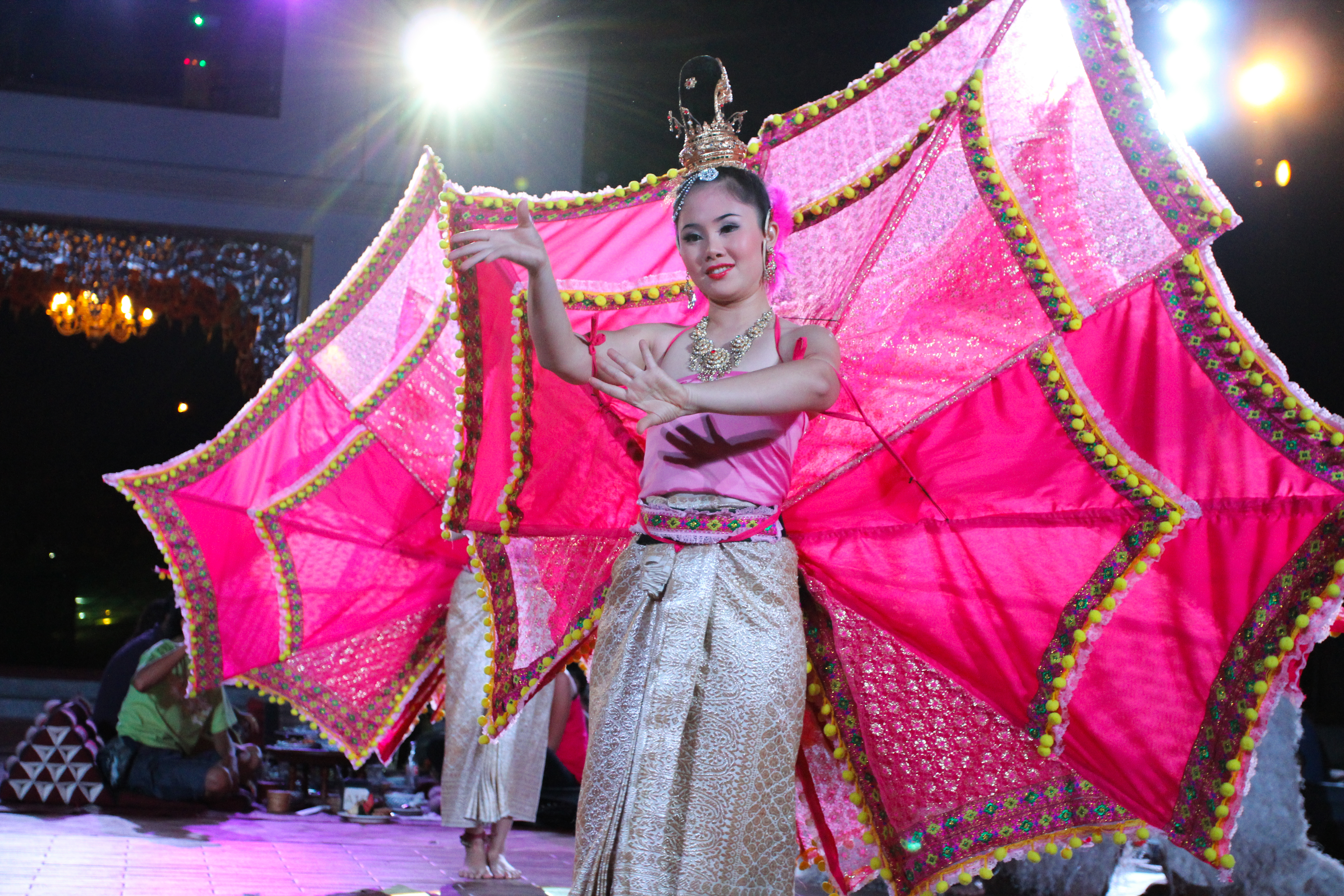
Dancers in Chiang Mai, Thailand

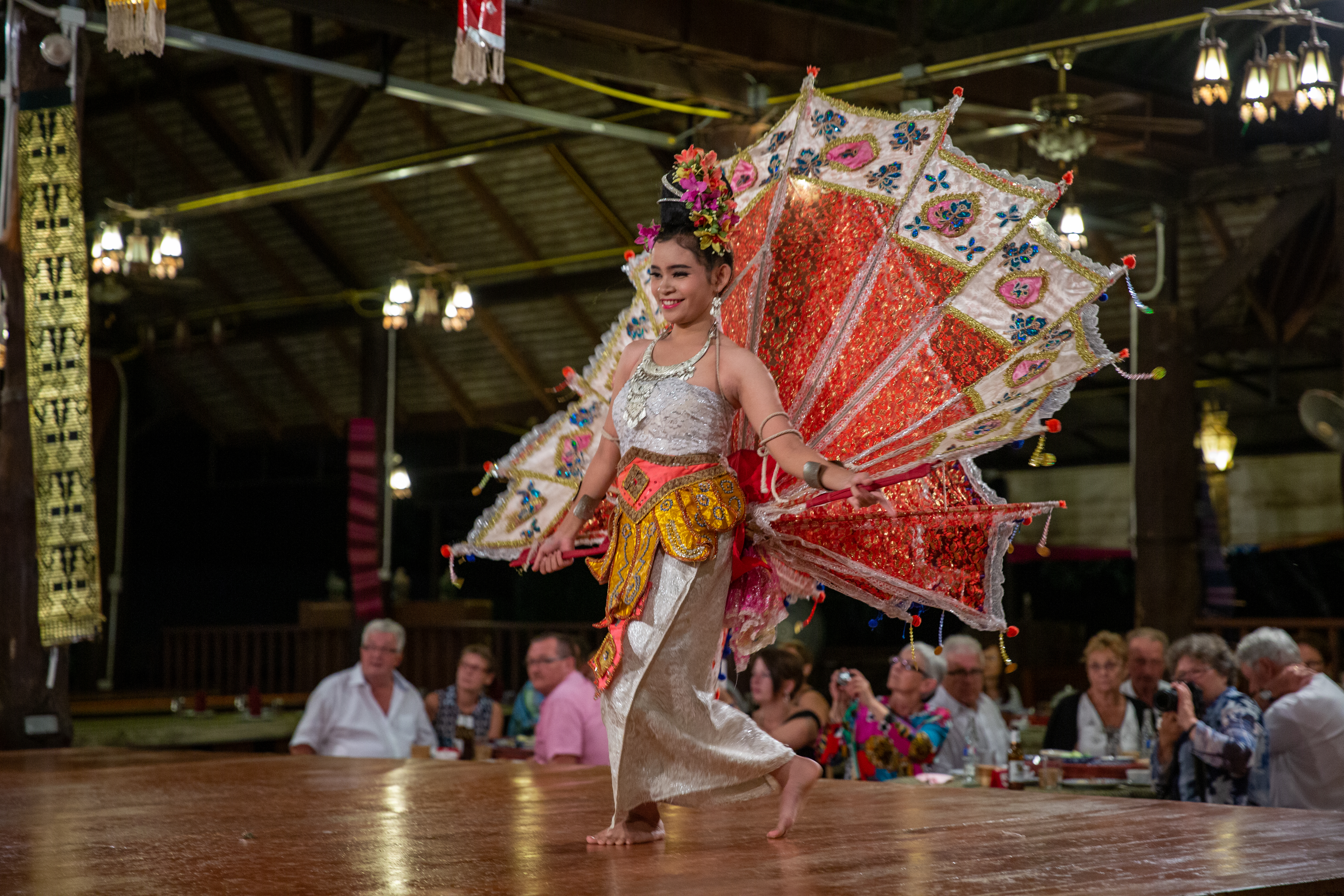
Dancers in Chiang Mai, Thailand

== See also ==
- Dance in Cambodia
- Dance in China
- Dance in India
- Dance in Indonesia
  - Sundanese dance
