= Menora (dance) =

Thailand theatrical performance

Manora
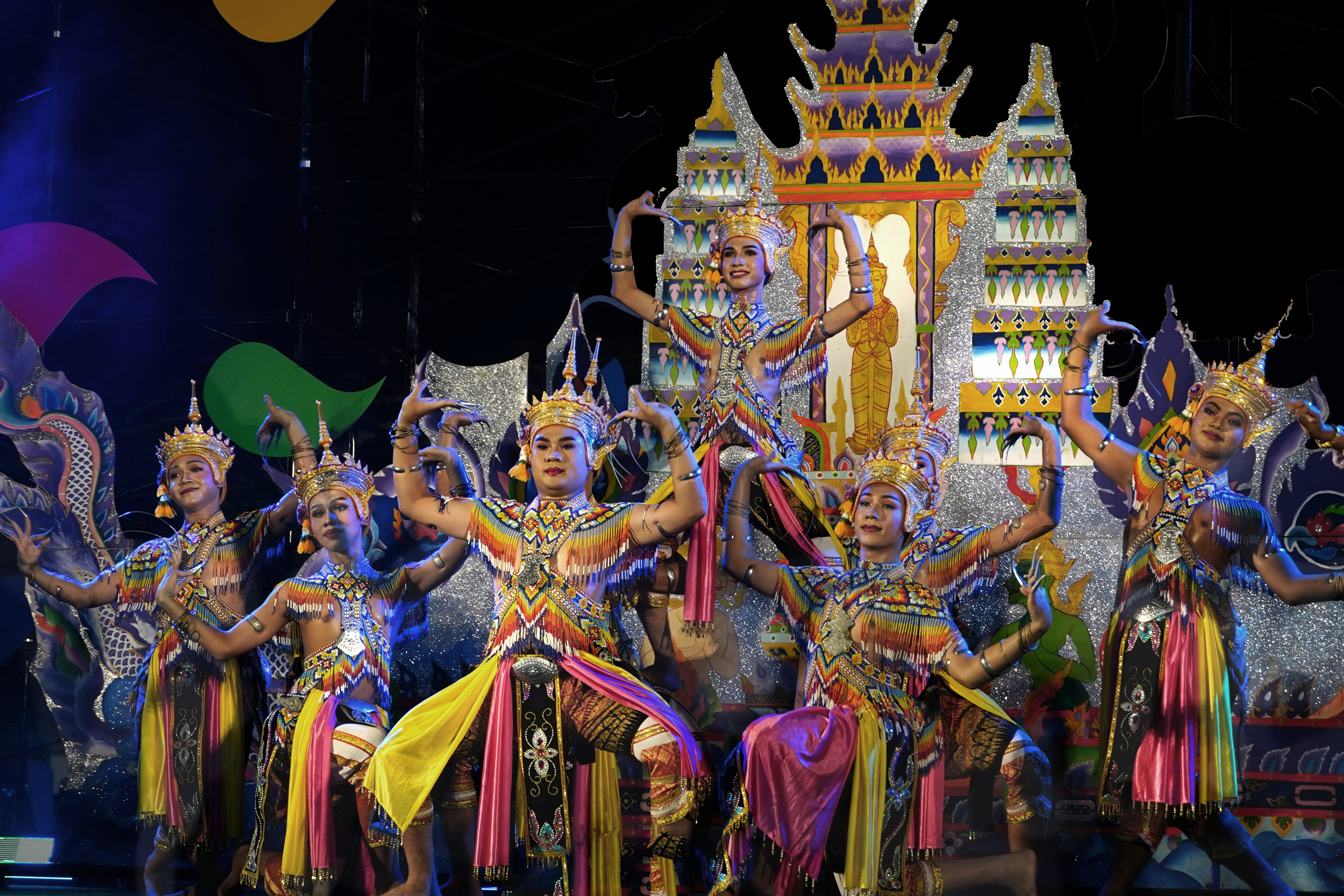
- Native name: มโนราห์ (Thai)
- Instrument(s): drums, gongs, cymbals and wooden clappers
- Inventor: Thai
- Origin: Southern Thailand

Nora, dance drama in southern Thailand
- UNESCO Intangible Cultural Heritage
- Country: Thailand
- Reference: 01587
- Region: Asia and the Pacific

Inscription history
- Inscription: 2021 (16th session)
- List: Representative

Menora or Manora (มโนราห์, pronounced [mā.nōː.rāː]), sometimes shortened as Nora (โนรา, pronounced [nōː.rāː]) is a traditional Thai theatrical, musical, and acrobatic dance performance originated from the southern regions of Thailand. Having similar plots adopted from Jataka tales of Manohara, this kind of performance is related to the Lakhon chatri (ละครชาตรี), another Siamese arts performance originating from central Thailand. Over five hundred years old, Nora is performed in Thailand's local community centres and at temple fairs and cultural events, and is passed on through training by masters in homes, community organizations and educational institutions. In Malaysia, the practice of Menora has significantly declined since it has been banned by the government of Kelantan, which considers this kind of cultural performance illegal on religious grounds for polytheism.

In 2021, Nora was officially recognized by UNESCO (United Nations Educational, Scientific and Cultural Organization) on the Representative List of the Intangible Cultural Heritage of Humanity.

== Mythology ==
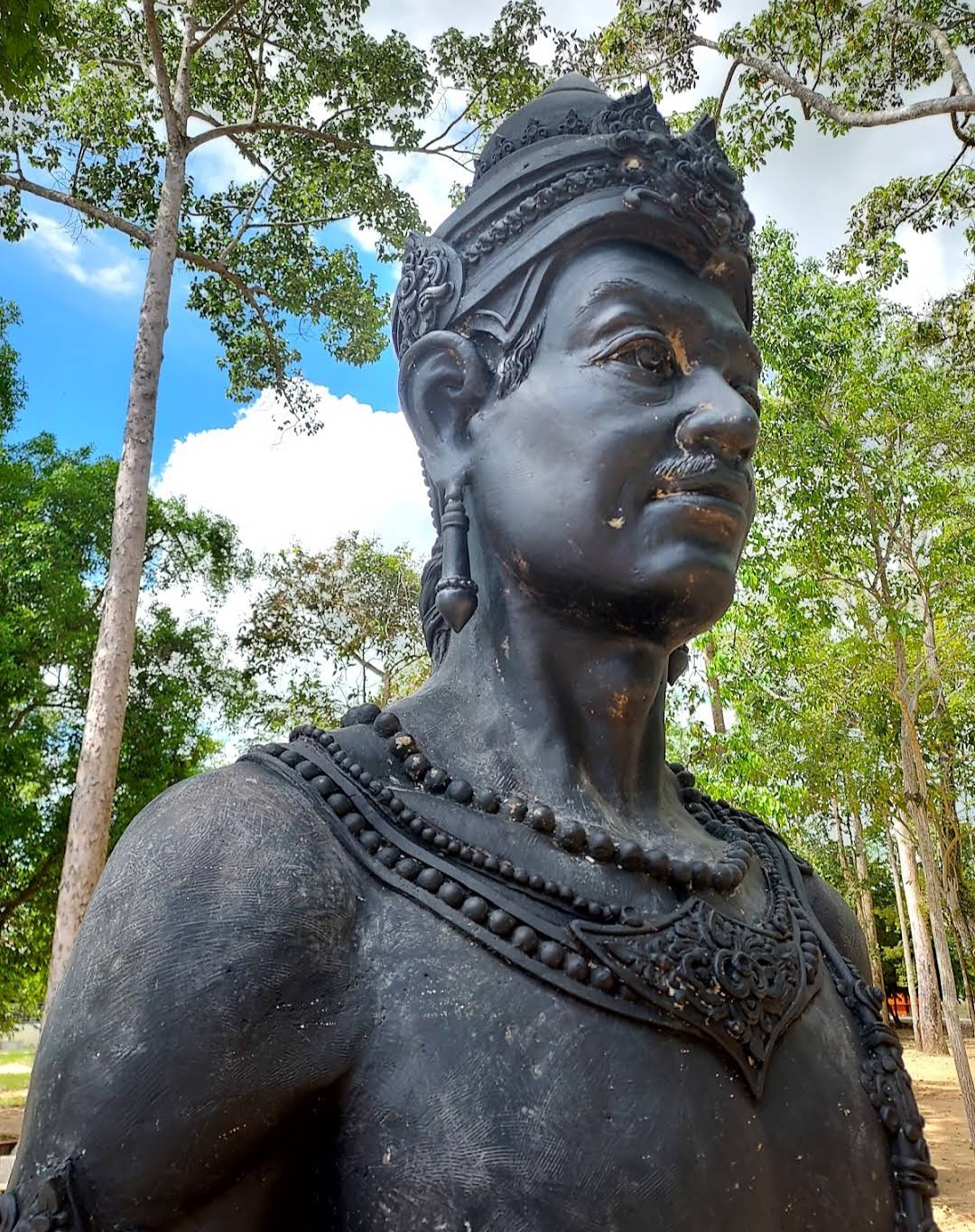
Phraya Saifa Fat, the ruler of Wiang Bang Kaew during the 8th - 9th century

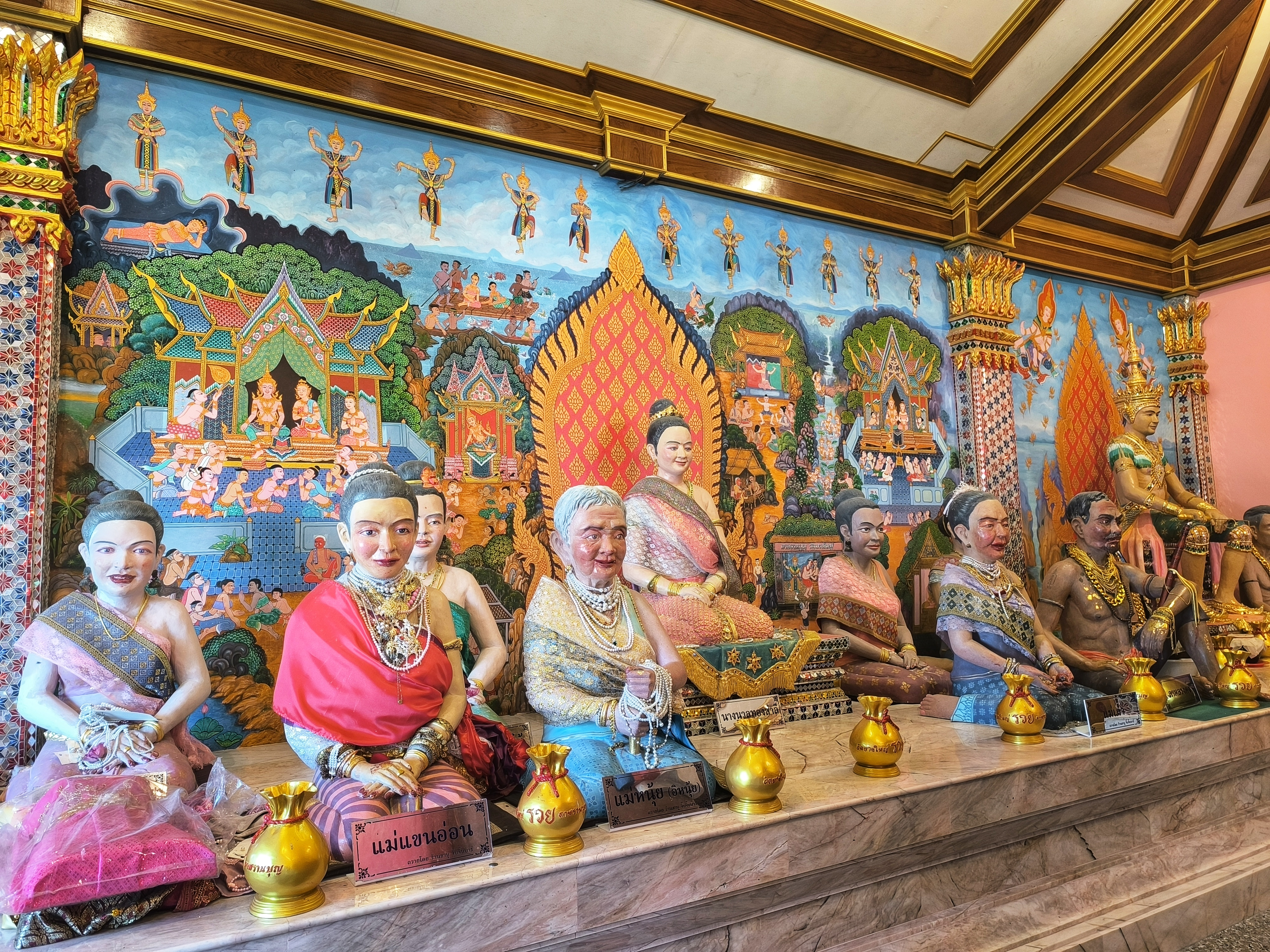
Menora mythological figures, Nakhon Si Thammarat

One of the notable legends associated with the origins of Menora is a narrative attributed to the National Artist in Performing Arts (Thai dance), Yok Choobua (Thai: ยก ชูบัว) from Songkhla. The story was documented through oral history by Asst. Prof. Saroch Nakavirot (Thai: ผศ.สาโรช นาคะวิโรจน์) and provides insight into the mythological foundations of the Nora tradition.

According to the legend, there once existed a kingdom of Wiang Bang Kaew ruled by a monarch named King Saifa Fat (Thai: พระยาสายฟ้าฟาด). His consort was Queen Si Mala (Thai: แม่ศรีมาลา), and together they had a daughter named Princess Nuanthong Samli (Thai: นางนวลทองสำลี), who was raised under the care of four attendants: Mother Khaen-on (Thai: แม่แขนอ่อน), Mother Phao (Thai: แม่เภา), Mother Mao Khluen (Thai: แม่เมาคลื่น) and Mother Yod Tong (Thai: แม่ยอดทอง).

As Nuanthong Samli matured into a young woman, the deity Indra dispatched a celestial being to be incarnated in her womb. When her pregnancy became visibly apparent, King Fat imprisoned her within the palace in an attempt to conceal the situation. However, when this was no longer possible, he ordered that she and her four attendants be cast adrift on a raft. The raft eventually came ashore at Kachang island (Thai: เกาะกะชัง), where the group took refuge.

In due time, Nuanthong Samli gave birth to a son, whom she named Ajit Kumar. As Ajit Kumar grew older he began to learn the art of dance by himself, often practicing alone by the water, using his reflection as a guide. He eventually got quite good and with his mother's consent he left the island to tour his dances in various places.

His talent gained widespread acclaim and eventually came to the attention of King Fat, who summoned the young dancer to the royal court. Struck by the youth’s resemblance to his daughter Nuant,hong Samli, the ruler questioned him and discovered that Ajit Kumar was, in fact, his own grandson. Deeply impressed by both his heritage and his artistic skill, the king conferred upon him the honorific title Khun Si Sattha (Thai: ขุนศรีศรัทธา), which means the lord of true devotion. And presented him with ceremonial dancer’s regalia, including the taret (headdress), tap suang (pectoral), sangwan (chest chain), hang hong (swan-tail garment), armbands, bracelets, pan neung (waistbelt), and other traditional ornaments.

The king then ordered that Nuanthong Samli be brought back to the city. Before reentering the court, she was housed at the outskirts and subjected to a ritual of purification (sadejakhro), which lasted three days and two nights, from Wednesday to Friday. This rite was presided over by King Saifa Fat himself and later became institutionalized as a standard ceremonial practice in the Menora tradition. The ritual is known as “Nora Rong Khru” (Thai: โนราโรงครู) and comprises components such as vow fulfillment, topknot-cutting, and headdress initiation (krob teret). It remains a critical spiritual and formal aspect of Menora training and performance today.

Following the completion of the ritual, Lady Nuanthong Samli was welcomed back into the city. Khun Si Sattha subsequently began teaching the Menora dance to members of the royal court and other noble figures, including Lord Lui Fai (Thai: พระยาลุยไฟ), Lord Thom Nam (Thai: พระยาโถมน้ำ), Ta Luang Sen (Thai: ตาหลวงเส้น), and Ta Luang Kong (Thai: ตาหลวงคง). This dissemination marked the beginning of Menora’s institutional and cultural spread throughout Southern Thailand.

== History ==
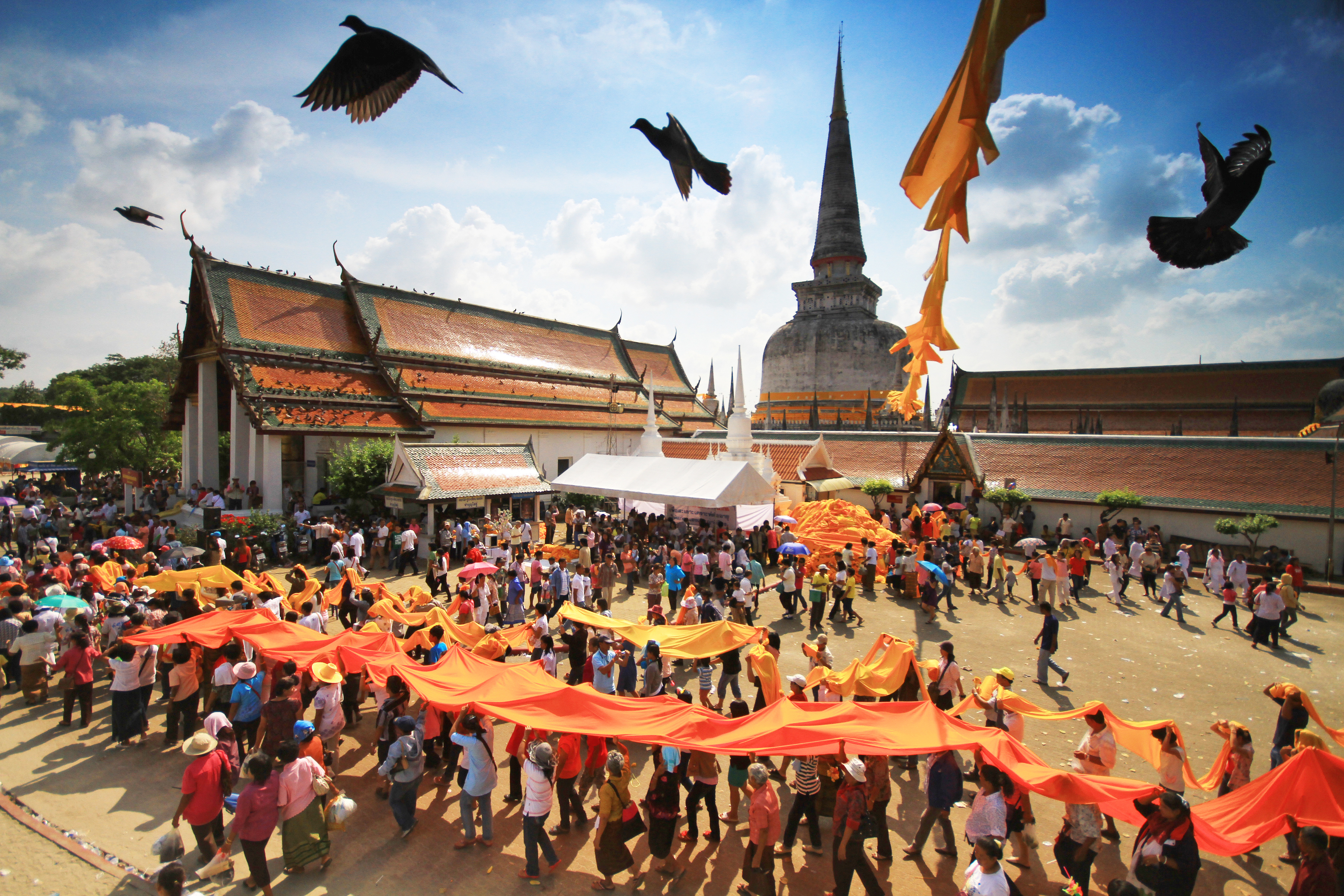
Wat Phra Mahathat, the main Buddhist temple of Southern Thailand

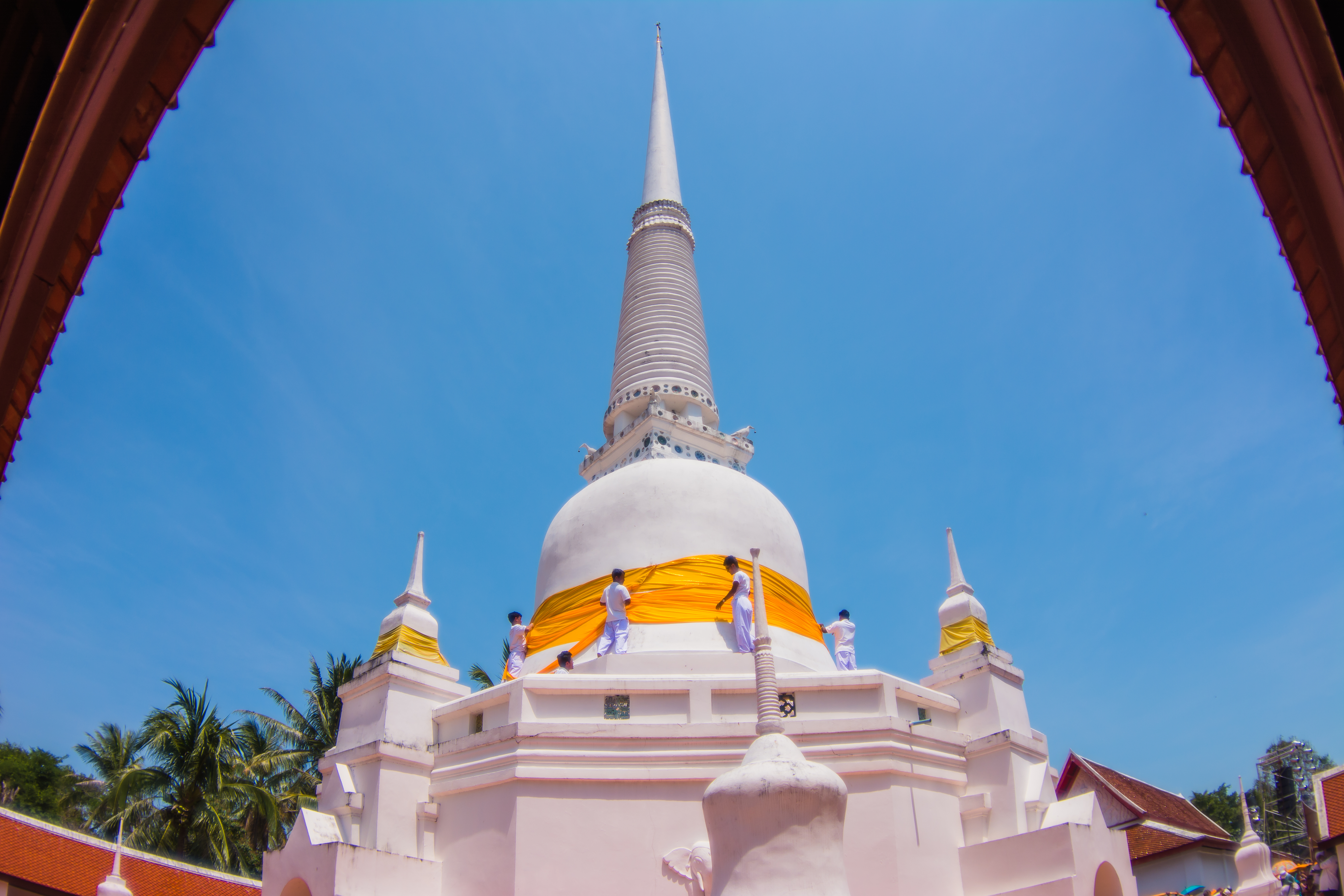
Wat Khienbangkaew, the ancient Buddhist temple related to Srivijaya and Ayutthaya Kingdom

The origin of Nora can be traced back to the Malay Peninsula during the Tambralinga period or the Srivijaya era, approximately between the 6th–11th centuries. This was a time when the city of Sathing Phra experienced its height of prosperity, with densely populated communities scattered along the eastern coastline, from Chumphon and Chaiya down to Kelantan, Terengganu, and other coastal towns engaged in maritime trade, extending as far as Sumatra.

During this period, as there were no strict territorial boundaries, the people shared the same religion and ethnic roots, facilitating the transmission of performing arts across the region. Therefore, it is difficult to pinpoint the exact place of origin of traditional Nora. However, according to the legend of Manora Chatri, the dance-drama is believed to have originated in ancient Phatthalung (known as Sathing Paranasi).

Initially, Nora performances were performed exclusively at royal courts before becoming popular among the general populace. The probable birthplace of Nora is thought to be among the group of cities known as the "Twelve Zodiac Cities" (Mueang 12 Naksat/Nakhon Si Thammarat Kingdom), beginning during the Tambralinga era. Over time, the art form spread to Central Thailand and evolved into a genre known as Lakhon chatri.

== Costume ==
The Nora costume is the traditional attire worn in the Nora dance, a classical Southern Thai performance art. The outfit is ornate, colorful, and designed to enhance the visual impact of the dance. It is worn by both male and female performers, though some elements are reserved specifically for the main performer (ตัวยืนเครื่อง or นายโรง).

=== Costume Components ===
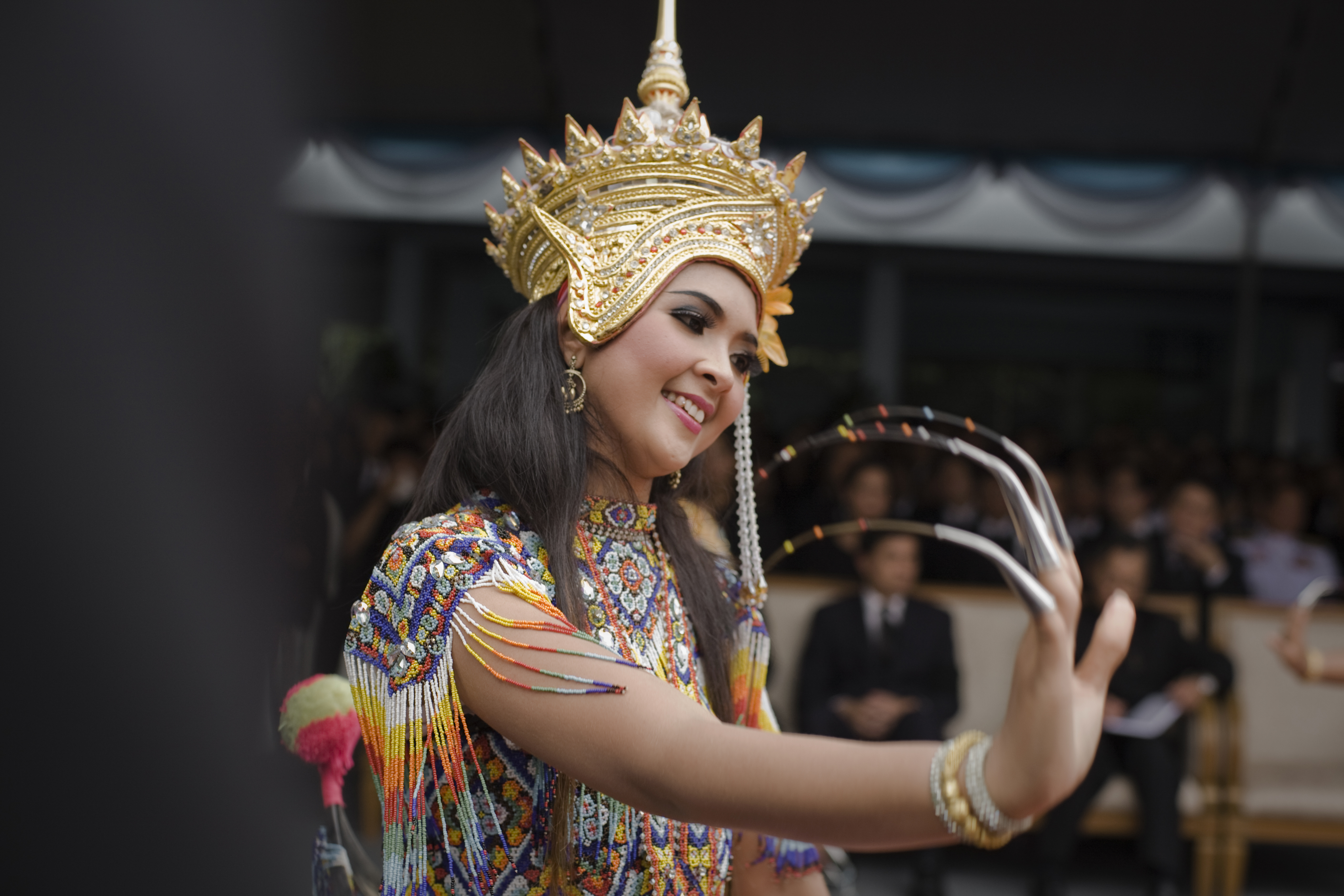
Menora dancer's costume

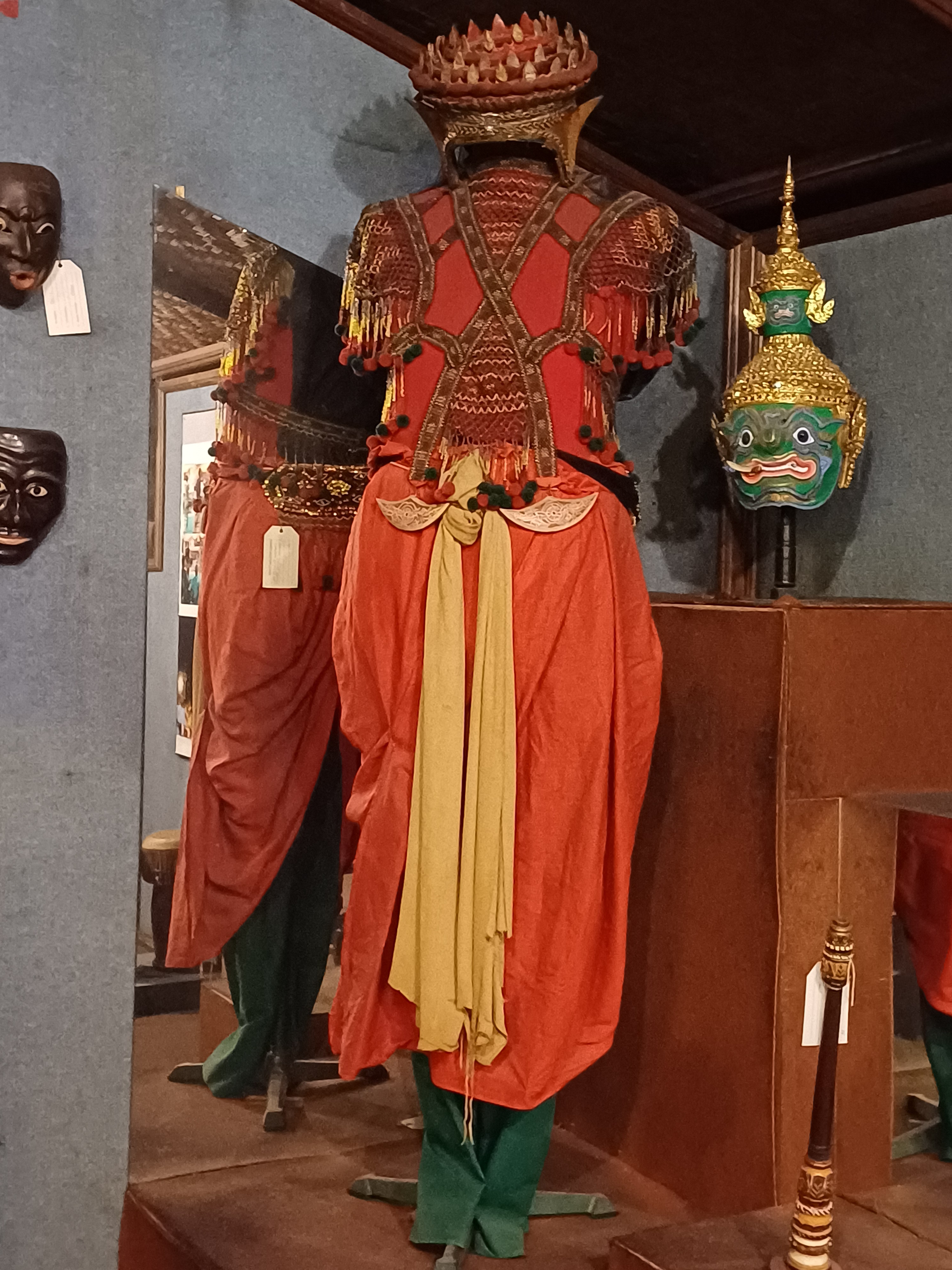
Menora Attire, Kelantan Museum

=== Serd (เทริด) ===
A low crown-like headpiece worn by the main performer. It features a decorated front frame and often includes sacred thread (ด้ายมงคล). Traditionally, female dancers do not wear the serd.

=== Beaded costume (เครื่องรูปปัด) ===
A decorative upper-body garment made entirely from colorful beads. It replaces the shirt and consists of five main parts:

- Shoulder straps (บ่า) – Worn over each shoulder (2 pieces)
- Neck bands (ปิ้งคอ) – Worn around the neck, front and back (2 pieces)
- Chest panel (พานอก / พานโครง / รอบอก) – Rectangular beaded cloth wrapped around the chest.

=== Swallow wings (ปีกนกแอ่น / ปีกเหน่ง) ===
Wing-like accessories often made of silver, shaped like a swallow's wings. They are attached to a belt above the hips and extend outward from the sides.

=== Chest ornament (ซับทรวง / ทับทรวง / ตาบ) ===
An ornamental piece worn on the chest, often crafted from silver or beads, sometimes inlaid with gemstones. Reserved for the main performer.

=== Rear wings or tail (ปีก / หาง / หางหงส์) ===
Tail-like structures worn at the back, made from buffalo horn or metal, with bead decorations. They resemble a bird's tail or Kinnari tail.

=== Pha nung (ผ้านุ่ง) ===
A long rectangular cloth wrapped tightly around the lower body. The end of the cloth is folded and tucked to form a tail-like shape called Hang Hong (หางหงส์).

=== Leg covers (หน้าเพลา / เหน็บเพลา / หนับเพลา) ===
Beaded shin guards worn beneath the pha nung, often designed with floral or geometric patterns.

=== Hanging cloths (ผ้าห้อย) ===
Colorful pieces of light, transparent cloth hanging from each side of the waist like tassels or flaps.

=== Front cloth panel (หน้าผ้า) ===
A decorated cloth attached in front of the pha nung, sometimes beaded or brightly colored, adding flair to the costume.

=== Armlets (กำไลต้นแขนและปลายแขน) ===
Brass or metal bracelets worn on the upper and lower arms to add elegance and a sense of strength.

=== Bracelets (กำไล) ===
Multiple bracelets made from brass, worn on wrists and ankles (usually 5–10 rings per limb), creating rhythmic sounds as the performer moves.

=== Fingernail extensions (เล็บ) ===
Long, curved nails made from brass or silver, sometimes extended with bamboo and beads. Worn on four fingers of each hand (excluding the thumbs).

=== Phran mask or Hunter mask (หน้าพราน) ===
A red mask representing the comic character Phran. Carved from wood with a long nose, white teeth, and tufts of white feathers or hair.

=== Tha Si mask (หน้าทาสี) ===
A mask worn by female comic characters in the Nora performance. It is crafted to resemble a woman's face and is usually painted white or flesh-colored. The mask may include delicate facial features and is used to convey a humorous or stylized persona.

== Performance ==
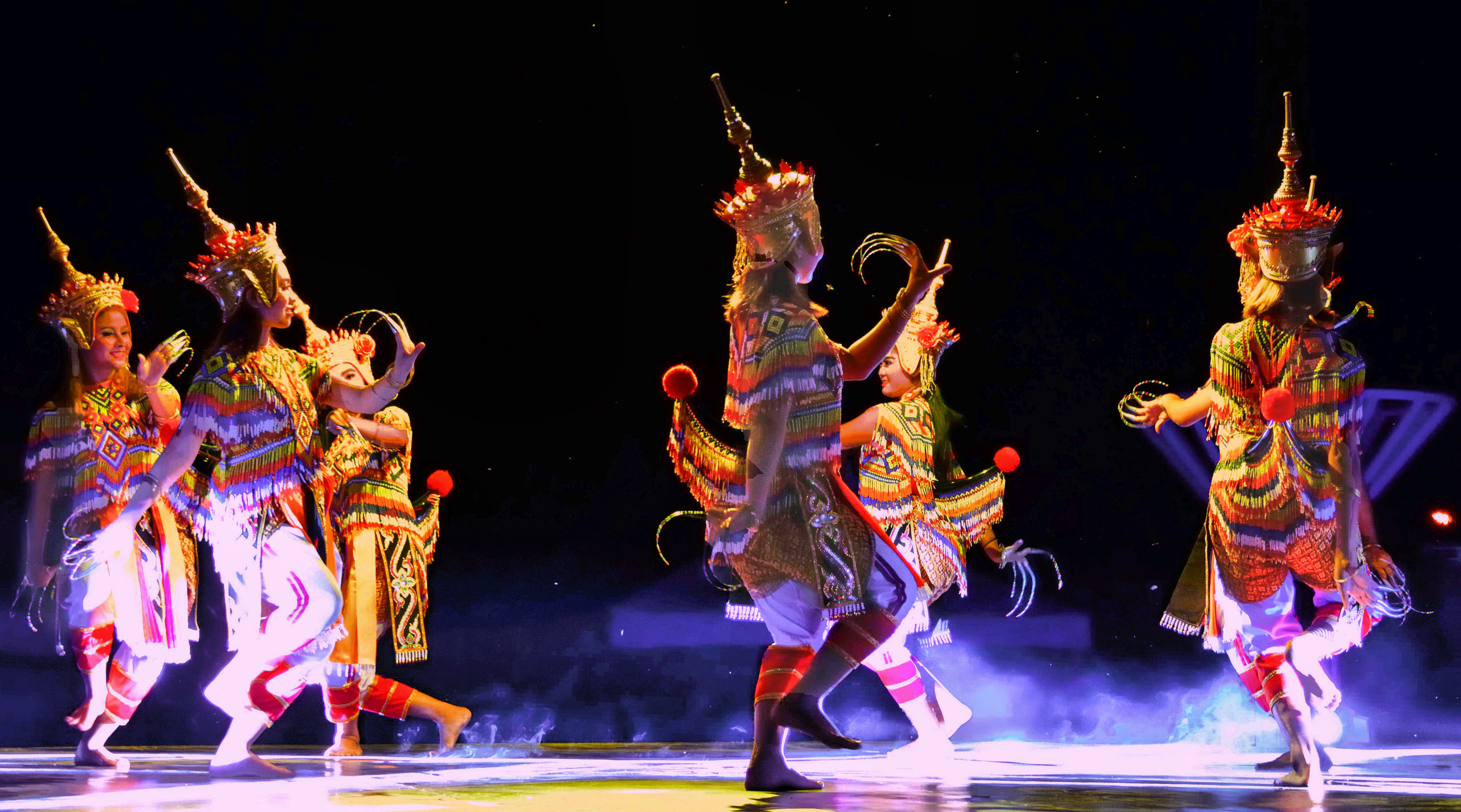
Menora Dance Performance

Nora performers showcase their talents through a combination of dancing, singing, choreography, and acting. Each aspect contributes to the overall artistry of the performance.

=== Dancing ===
Performers must demonstrate their skill and expertise by blending various dance movements seamlessly. Each movement should adhere to traditional forms, showcasing agility and the ability to adapt to musical rhythms, whether graceful or energetic. Some may specialize in specific dance techniques, such as arm movements, flexibility, or intricate steps.

=== Singing ===
Actors must exhibit their vocal abilities by delivering lines of poetry with clarity and emotion. They should maintain accurate rhythm, show quick wit in improvisation, and possess strong content delivery, including the ability to engage in call-and-response singing.

=== Choreography ===
Choreography involves interpreting the lyrics through dance, ensuring the movements are diverse and harmoniously aligned with the music. This aspect is considered the pinnacle of Nora art, requiring a deep connection between lyrics and dance that matches the music's rhythm and style.

=== Specialized Dance Forms ===
In addition to general dance and singing skills, performers must train in specific dance forms for particular occasions, such as ritual or competition. Some specialized dances include:

- Teacher's dance
- First dance
- Rhythmic dances with flute or drums
- Specific ceremonial dances

=== Acting ===
While traditional Nora performances do not focus on acting, when time permits, performers may include brief skits for entertainment, selecting well-known scenes that require minimal cast (2-3 actors) and emphasizing humor and poetic dialogue in the Nora style.

== Nora Rong Khru ==
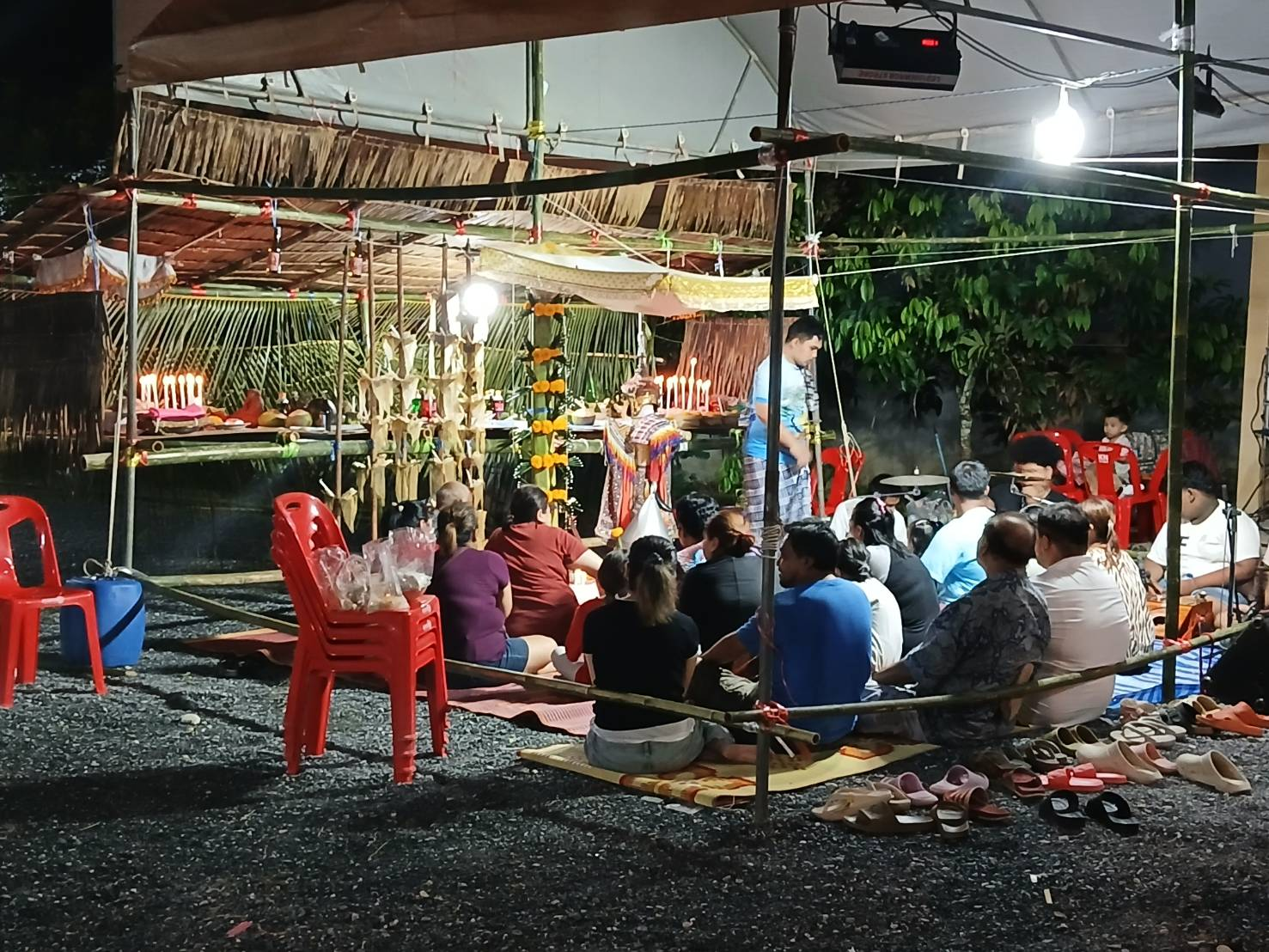
Nora Rong Khru Ceremony

The Nora Rong Khru (Thai: โนราโรงครู) is a sacred ritual performance within Southern Thailand’s Nora dance tradition, held to honor the spiritual teachers and ancestral masters who safeguard the art. There are two main types of Nora Rong Khru:

=== Rong Khru Yai ===
(Thai: โรงครูใหญ่) This is the full, formal version of the ceremony, typically conducted over three days and two nights. The ritual begins on a Wednesday and concludes on Friday.

The first stage starts at dusk on Wednesday, during a period known as Yam Nok Chum Rang (the time when birds return to their nests). The troupe leader, known as the Nai Rong (Thai: นายโรง), performs the Buek Rong (Opening the Nora Stage) ritual by using betel nuts inscribed with sacred symbols and chanting incantations to request permission from the spiritual guardians and the lineage of teachers.

Following this, the orchestra plays the Cherd Sam Khra (Thai: การเชิดสามครา) — a ceremonial overture performed three times — as an offering to honor the masters. Then, the troupe performs the Kard Khru (Thai: การกาศครู) ritual, which includes five traditional songs dedicated to praising the ancestral teachers.

On Thursday at around 05:30, the Chak Saeng Thong (ชักแสงทอง) ritual is performed to welcome the new day’s golden light. At noon, the Taeng Phok (แทงพอก) ceremony is held, followed by the recitation of 12 Gamprat (Thai: 12 กำพรัด) verses.

The Tang Baan Tang Mueang (Thai: ตั้งบ้านตั้งเมือง) ceremony establishes a spiritual boundary using symbolic natural elements such as: Imperata grass, Krun grass, Mon grass, Taro leaves, Banyan leaves, Kumcham leaves, Wild lotus, Lotus Khlang, rice grains, gold, silver, a razor blade, a whetstone, and pure water.

If anyone wishes to undergo the Yieb Sen (Thai: เหยียบเสน) spiritual empowerment ritual, the Racha Khru (Thai: ราชครู) will conduct it.

The troupe performs Ok Phran (Thai:ออกพราน) — a storytelling sequence of twelve episodes — until sunset.

During the night, the Cheua Khru (Thai: เชื้อเชิญครู) ritual is performed, inviting ancestral spirits to descend and possess chosen mediums until dawn on Friday.

On Friday morning, the Woi Hom Rab (Thai: เหวยหมฺรับ) farewell ritual is conducted. Later that day, the Song Khru (Thai: ส่งครู) ceremony formally sends the spirits back, concluding with Nang Nok Jok, Bud Rach, Tat Hemrey, and Plik Sad Khla to complete the ritual cycle.

This form of the ceremony is traditionally held annually or according to specific vows, every three or five years.

=== Rong Khru Kam Khru ===
(Thai: โรงค้ำครู) This is a condensed version of the ceremony, lasting only one day and one night. Typically, it begins on Wednesday evening and concludes on Thursday. Despite the abbreviated form, the purpose of Rong Khru Kam Khru remains the same: to honor the spiritual masters and reaffirm the sacred lineage of Nora practitioners.

== Nora Competition (Nora Prachan Rong) ==
Nora competitions, or Nora Prachan Rong, are held to showcase dance skills, spontaneous poetry (mutto), and artistic talents. The better troupe draws a larger audience and wins.

Before the competition, a ritual is performed: teachers are honored, a headdress (therit) is tied to the ceiling, and betel nuts and candles are offered. The troupe’s shaman performs protective rites, staying awake all night and sprinkling holy water.

The headdress is spun three times to predict the outcome: facing the opponent predicts victory; otherwise, defeat.

During the contest, performers first dance in groups, followed by the lead dancer (Nai Rong) who, after a ritual led by the shaman, circles the performance area three times to spread compassion and blessings to the audience and all beings, before continuing the performance.

== Menora Dance Postures ==
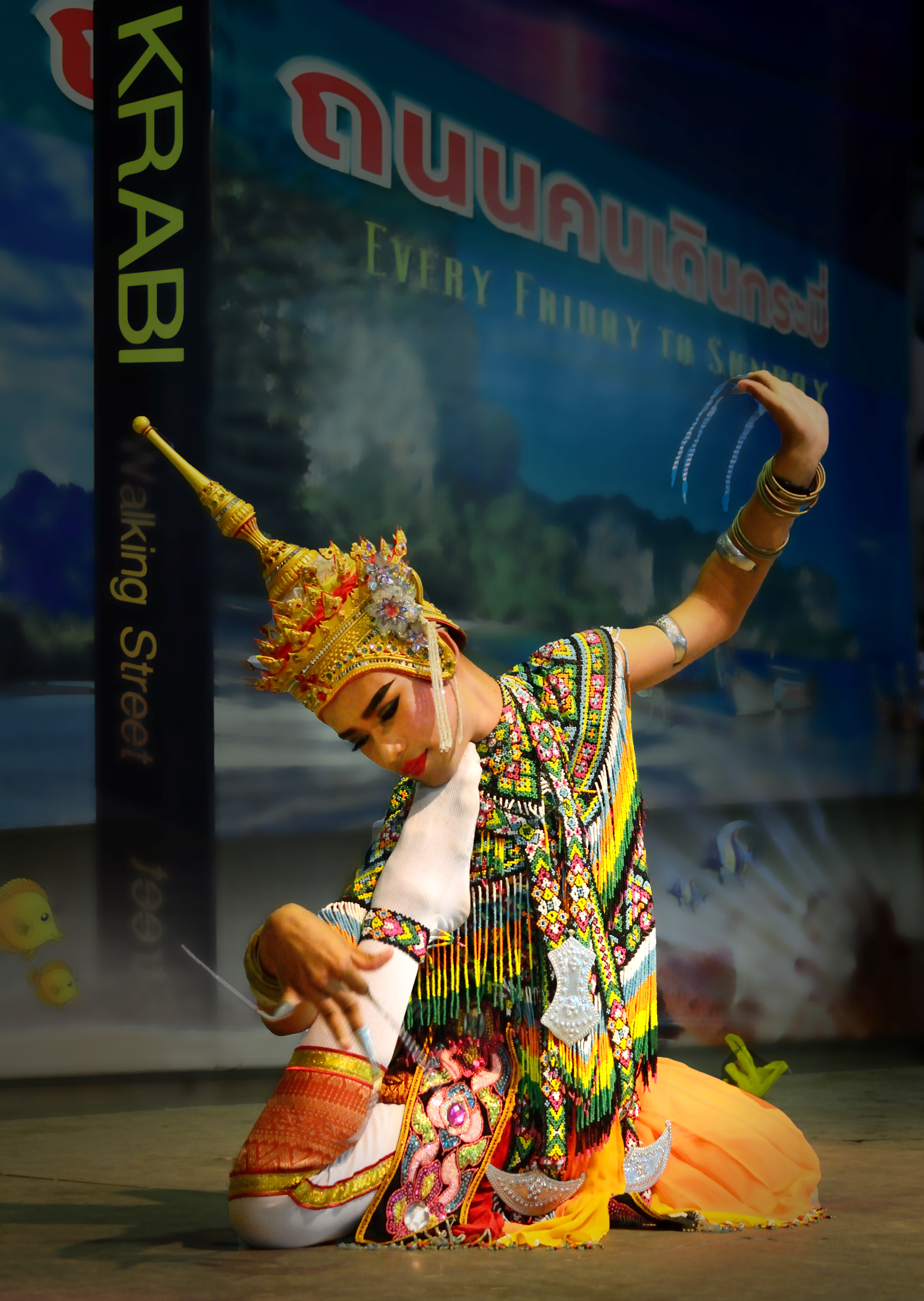
Menora Dance Posture

The traditional Southern Thai dance known as Menora is based on a repertoire of principal dance postures that form the foundation of its movement vocabulary. These postures are deeply rooted in classical Thai dramatic traditions and are integral to the performance and storytelling of Menora. In Tamnan Lakhon Inao (The History of the Inao Drama), a study of the Thai dance drama Inao, which was adapted from the Javanese Panji tales, Prince Damrong Rajanubhab recorded 12 principal postures:

- Mae Lai (ท่าแม่ลาย) or Mae Lai Kanok (ท่าแม่ลายกนก)
- Phala (ท่าผาลา)
- Long Chak (ท่าลงฉาก)
- Chap Rabam (ท่าจับระบำ)
- Kinnara Ram (ท่ากินนรรำ), also known as Khi Non (ท่าขี้หนอน)
- Chak Noi (ท่าฉากน้อย)
- Rahu Chap Chan (ท่าราหูจับจันทร์), also known as Khao Khwai (ท่าเขาควาย)
- Bua Yaem (ท่าบัวแย้ม)
- Bua Ban (ท่าบัวบาน)
- Bua Khli (ท่าบัวคลี่)
- Bua Tum (ท่าบัวตูม)
- Maeng Mum Chak Yai (ท่าแมงมุมชักใย)

These twelve postures formed the historical foundation of the Menora dance tradition. Over time, Nora masters developed and codified additional movements, expanding the repertoire to approximately 83 principal dance postures, which constitute the core movement vocabulary of contemporary Menora performance.

== Musical instruments ==
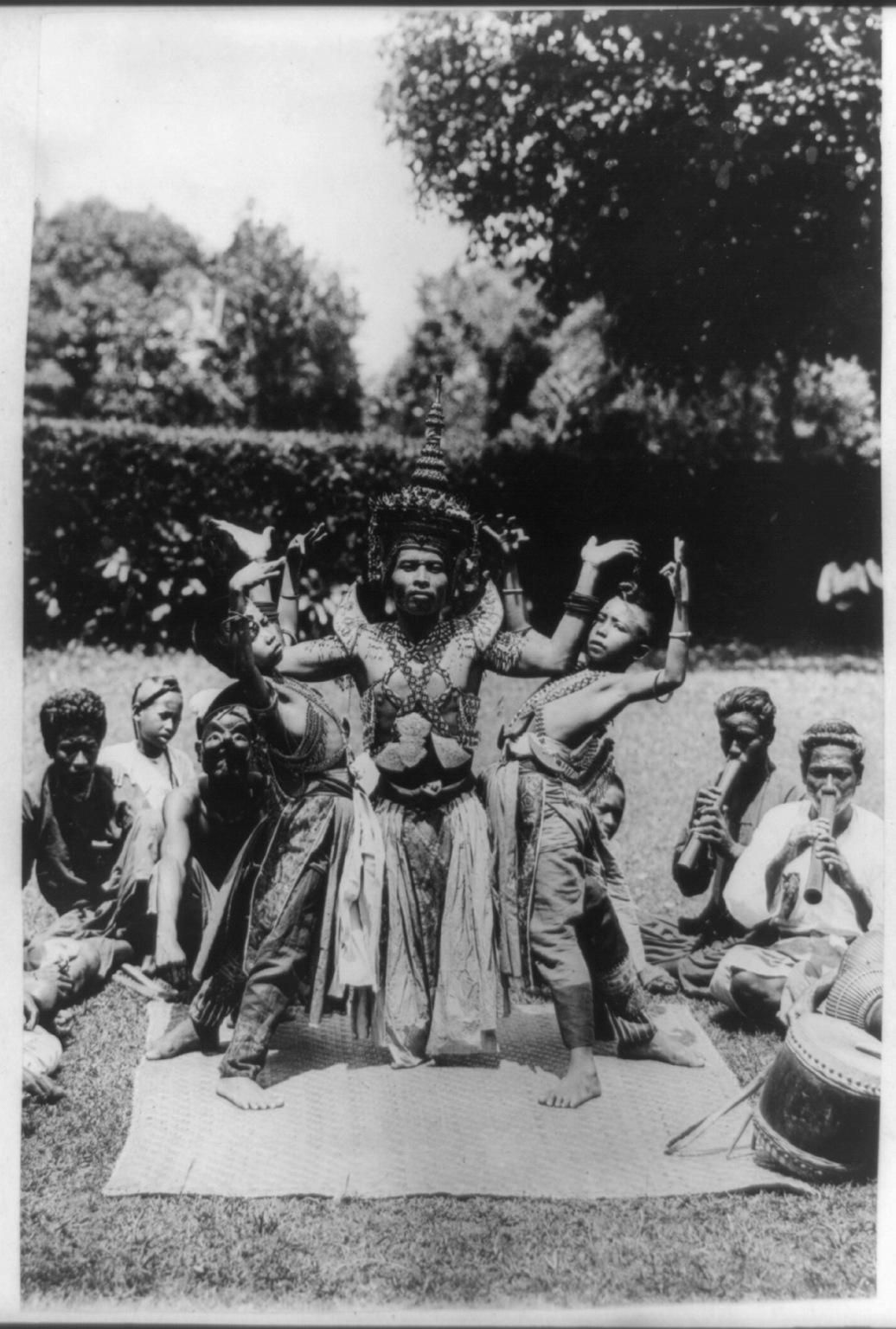
Menora dancers, Thailand, between 1890 and 1923

The Menora performance is characterized by a unique ensemble of traditional Thai musical instruments that provide rhythm and melody, enhancing the overall experience of the dance and drama.

The primary instrument is the Thap (Thai: ทับ), a percussion instrument played by a single performer who maintains the rhythm and guides the tempo in accordance with the dancer's movements.

The Klong (Thai: กลอง) is a small drum that complements the Thap by accentuating the rhythm.

The Pi (Thai: ปี่) is the sole wind instrument in the ensemble, typically resembling a flute, and is capable of producing multiple pitches from a single reed.

The Mong (Thai: โหม่ง) consists of a pair of gongs with distinct high and low tones, enriching the auditory landscape of the performance.

The Ching (Thai: ฉิ่ง) are metallic cymbals that emphasize the rhythm and are struck to complement the tempo of traditional Thai music.

Finally, the Trae (Thai: แตระ) or Krap (Thai: กรับ) is a type of percussion instrument that can be played solo or in pairs, often producing varying pitches when struck against other instruments.

Together, these instruments create a vibrant and dynamic soundscape that is integral to the Menora tradition.

== Gallery ==
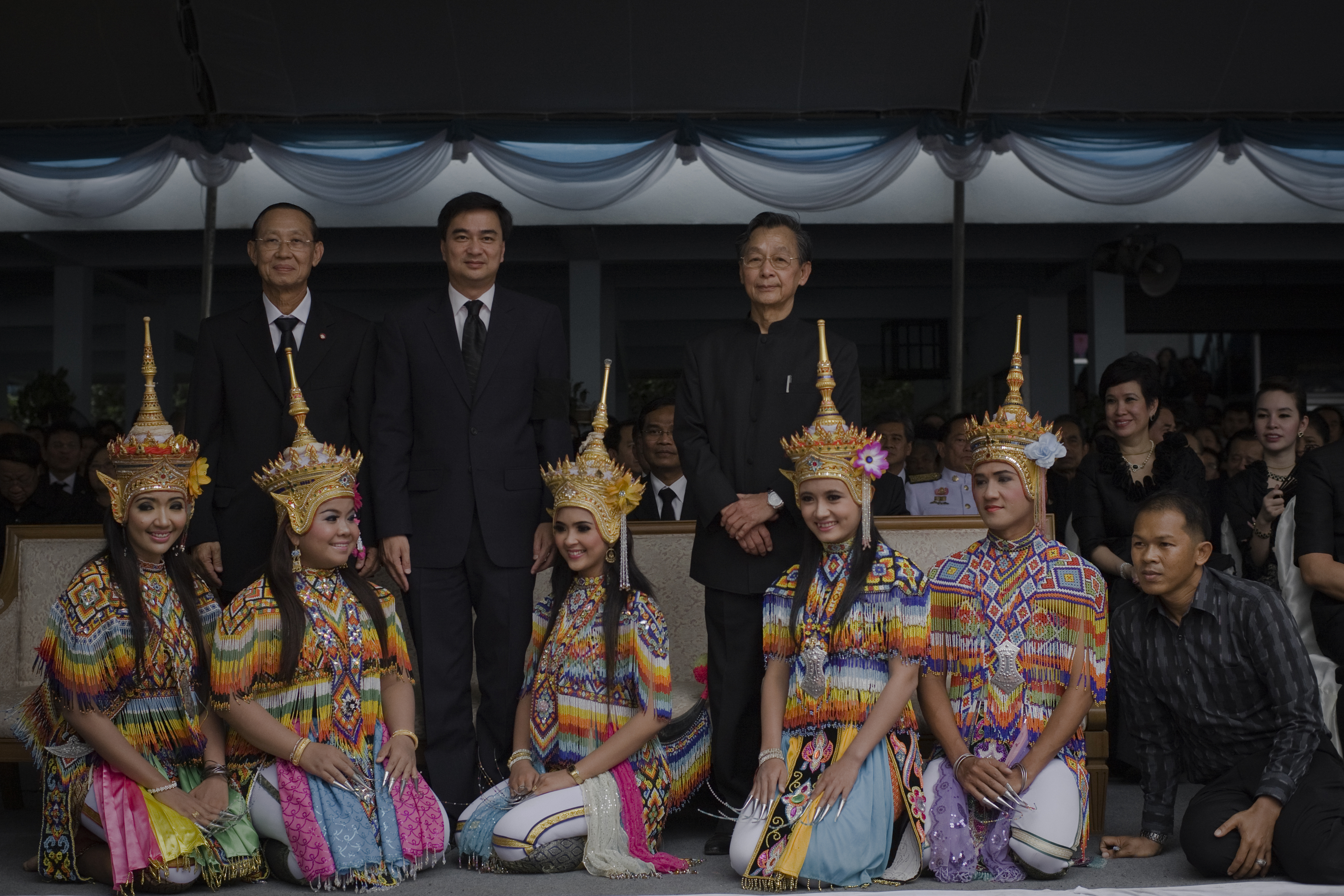
Nora Dance performed at a funeral, Trang province.

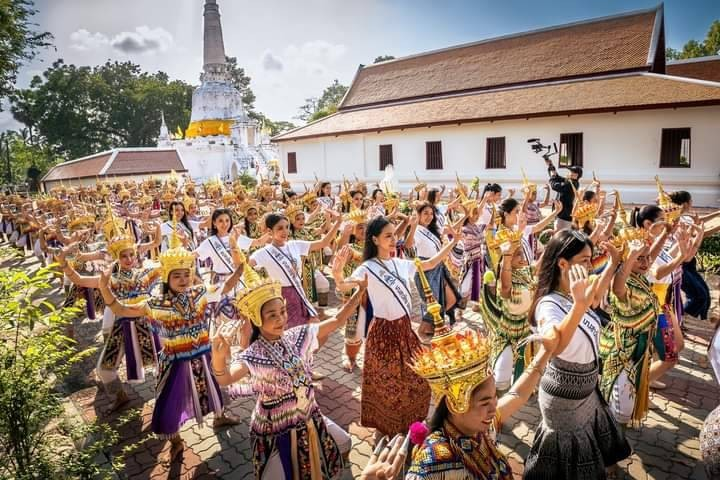
Nora Dance at Wat Khien Bang Kaeo, Phatthalung province.

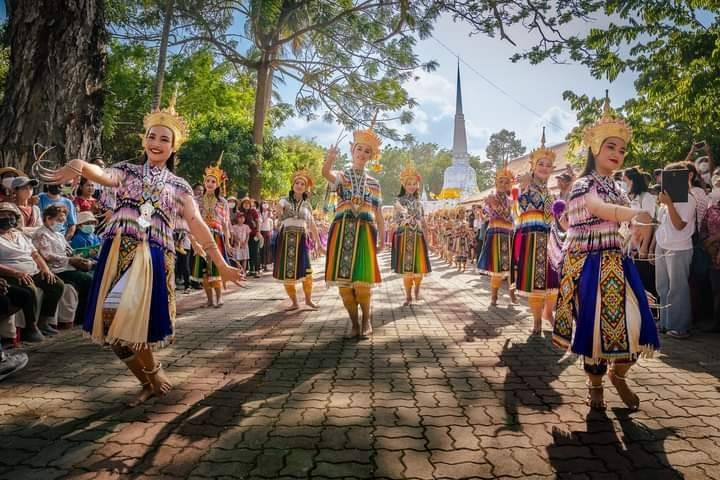
Nora Dance at Wat Khien Bang Kaeo, Phatthalung province.

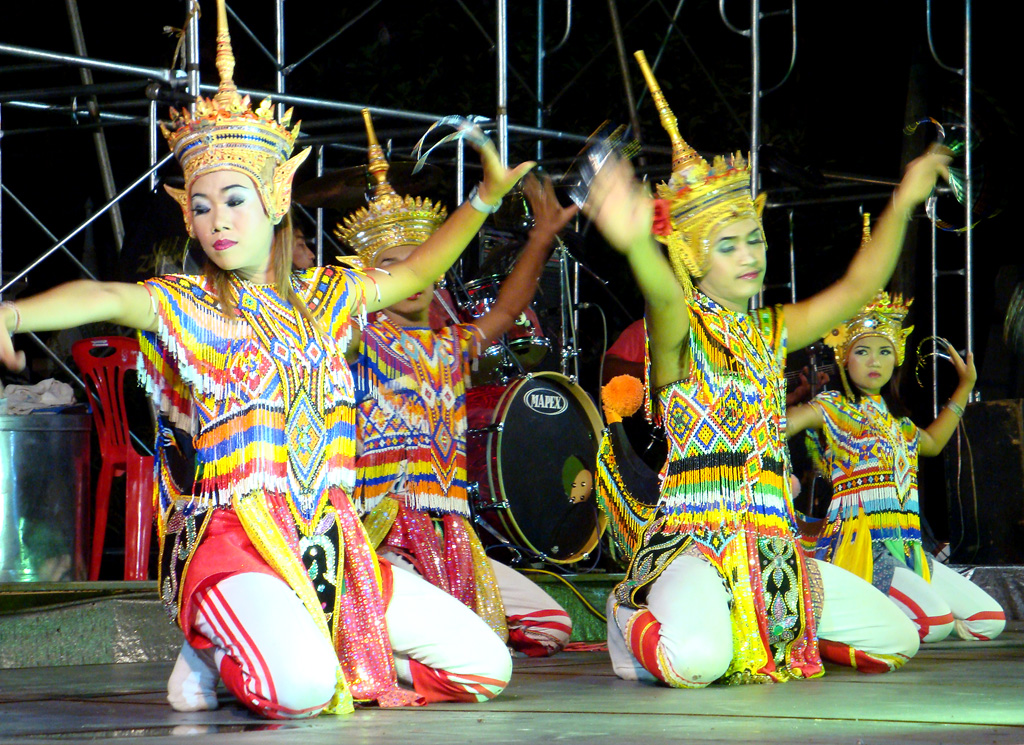
Nora Dance performed at a temple fair in Koh Samui.

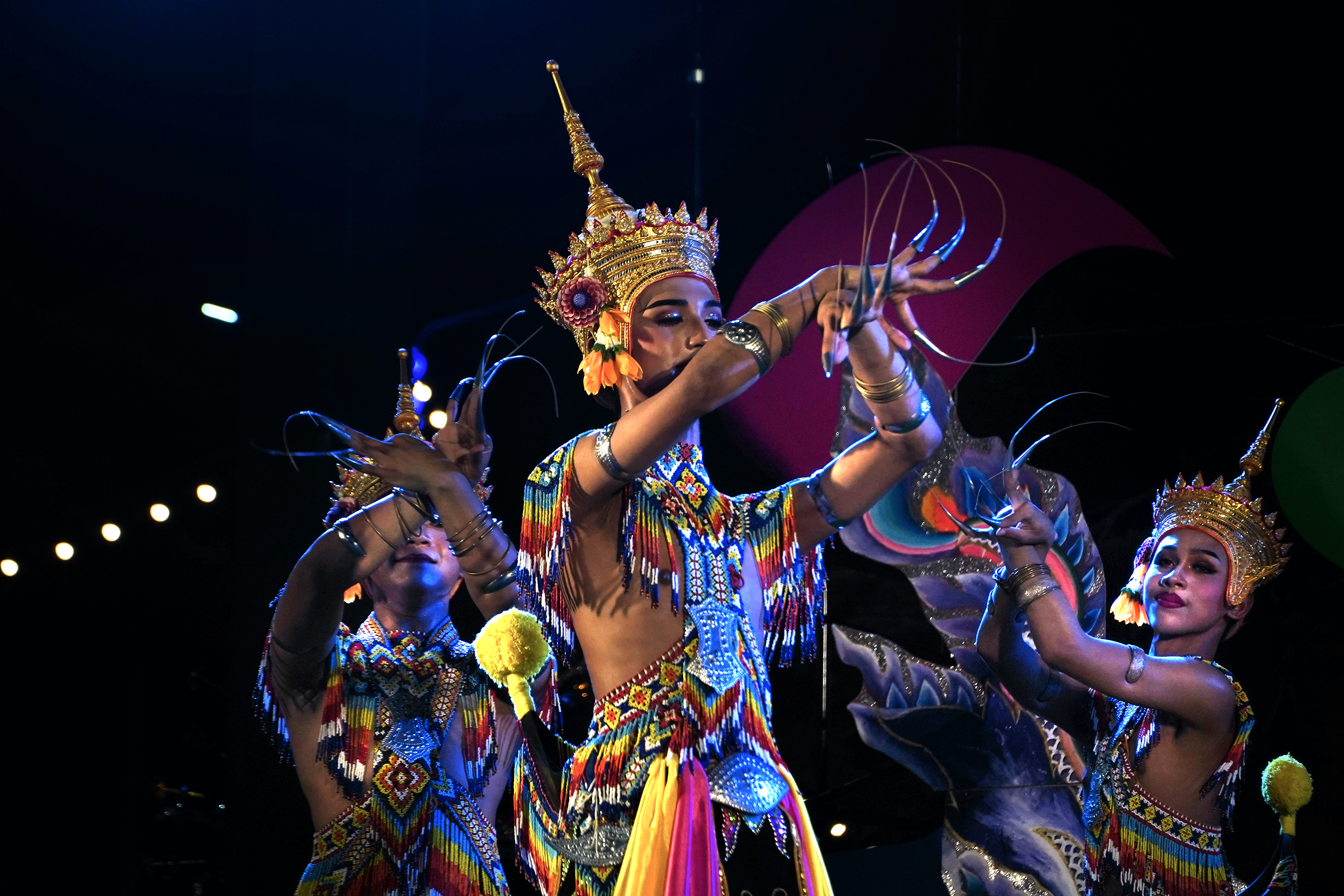
Nora Dance performed at an art festival, Krabi province.

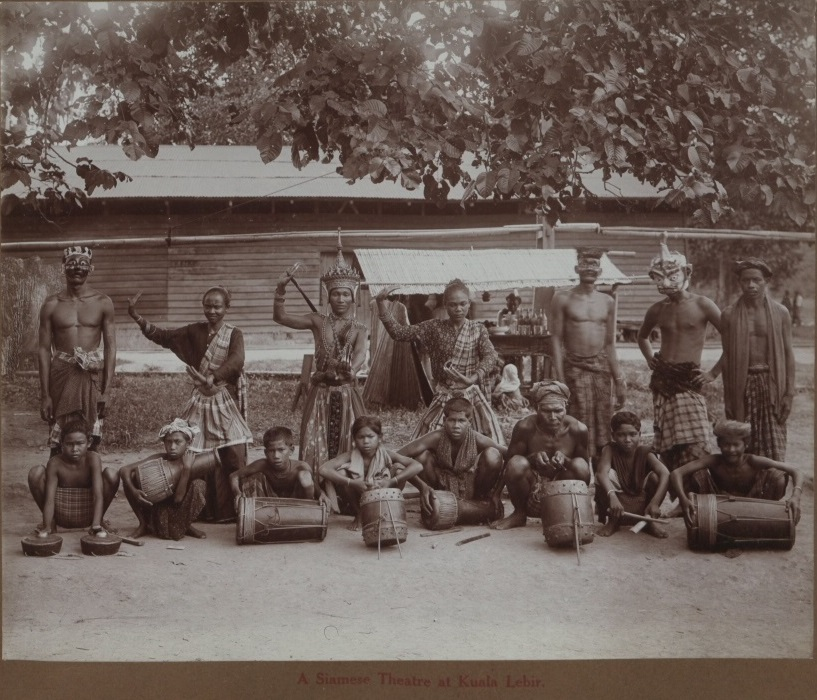
Nora Troupe at Kelantan, Malaysia, 1909

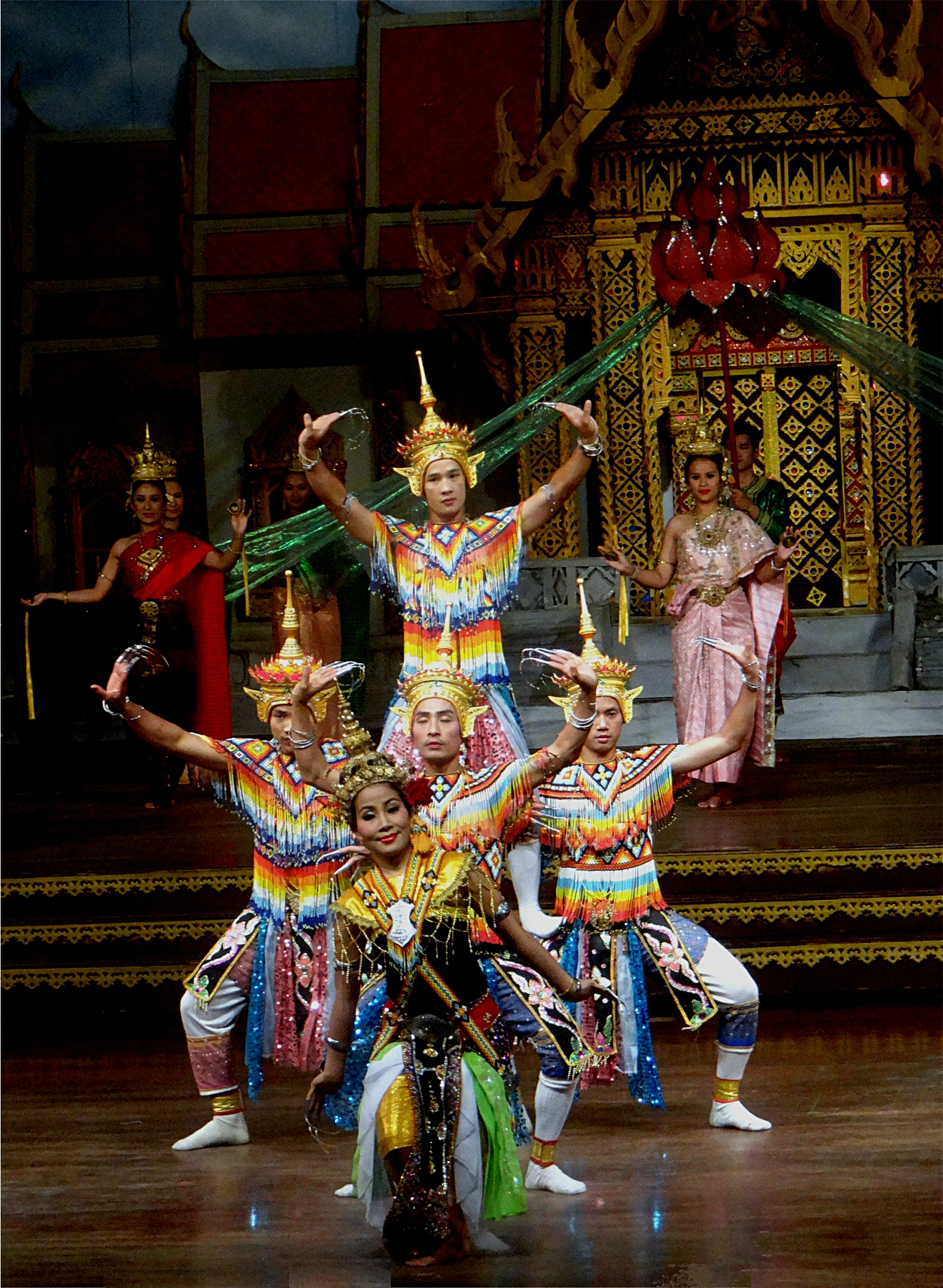
Nora Dance performed at Nong Nooch Tropical Garden, Chonburi province.

== See also ==
- Nang talung
- Mak yong
- Mek Mulung
- Southern Thailand, birthplace of the tradition
- List of Intangible Cultural Heritage elements in Thailand
