= Sundanese dances =

Sundanese traditional dance, Indonesia

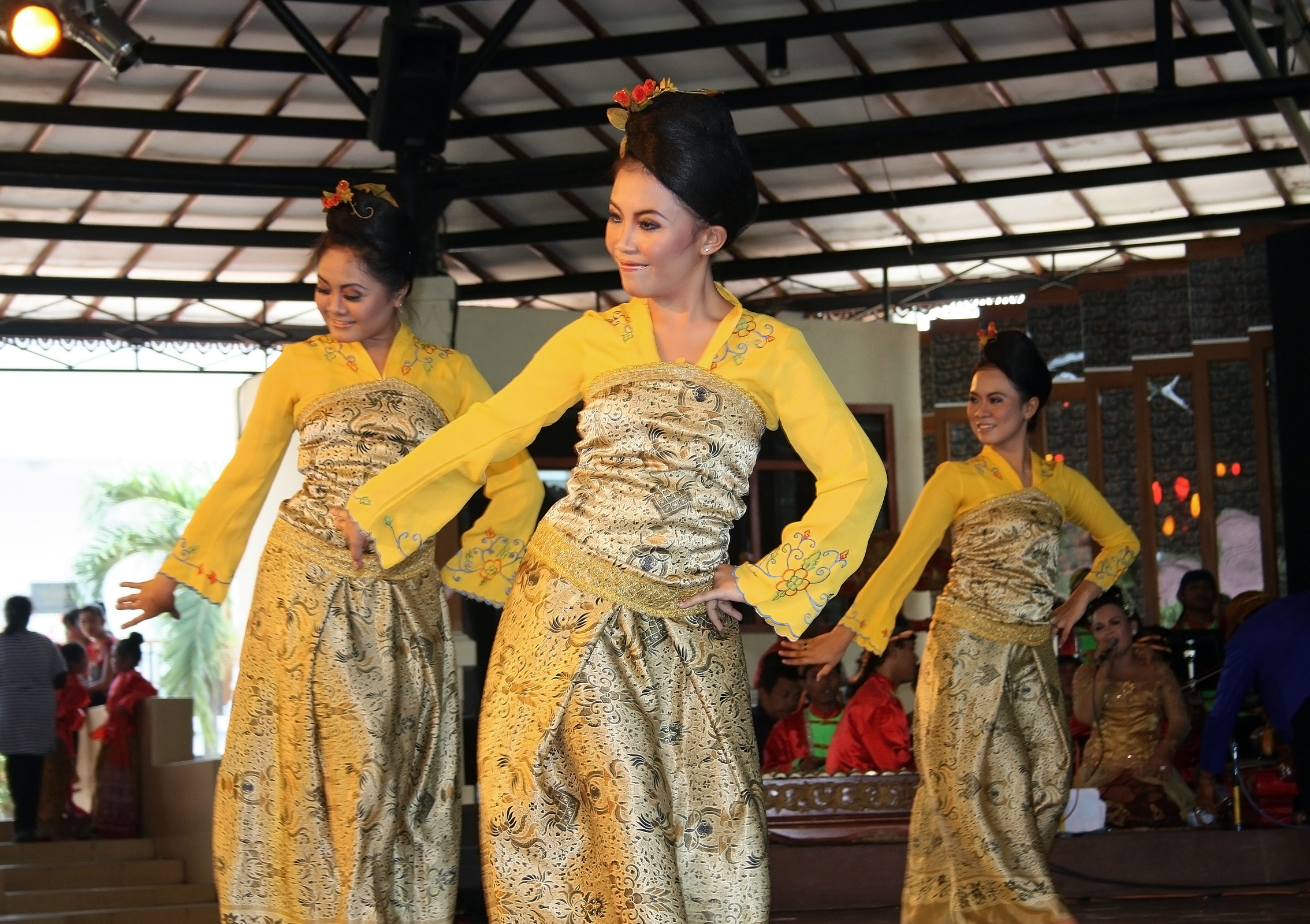
Jaipongan Mojang Priangan dance.

Sundanese dances (Indonesian: Tarian Sunda) is a dance tradition that is a part of ritual, artistic expression as well as entertainment and social conduct among the Sundanese people of West Java and Banten, Indonesia. Sundanese dance is usually cheerful, dynamic and expressive, with flowing movements in-sync with the beat of kendang accompanied with Gamelan degung music ensemble.

In Sundanese culture the term ngibing means "to dance", but it is indeed performed in particular Sundanese style, usually performed between male and female couple. In West Java, all it takes is a woman's voice and a drum beat to make a man get up and dance. Every men there breach ordinary standards of decorum and succumb to the rhythm at village ceremonies or weddings. The music the men dance to varies from traditional gong degung ensembles to the contemporary pop known as dangdut, but they consistently dance with great enthusiasm. Henry Spiller in "Erotic Triangles" draws on decades of ethnographic research to explore the reasons behind this phenomenon, arguing that Sundanese men use dance to explore and enact contradictions in their gender identities. Framing the three crucial elements of Sundanese dance—the female entertainer, the drumming, and men's sense of freedom—as a triangle.

== Types of Sundanese dances ==
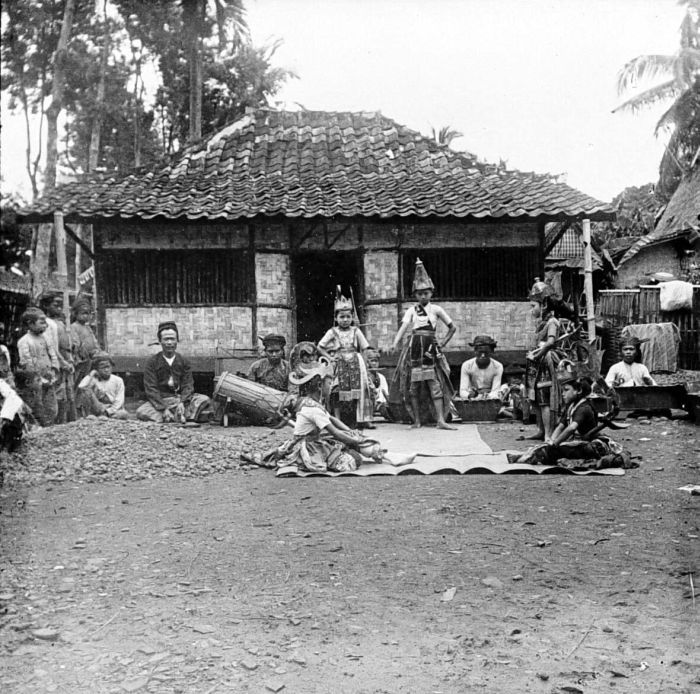
Sundanese dance performance in a village at Preanger (Priangan) region, circa early 20th century.

Among Sundanese dances perhaps Jaipongan is the most popular styles and form. Jaipongan dance could be performed solo by a female dancer, in group of female dancers, as couple between professional female and male dancers, or as couple when professional female dancers invite male audience to dance with them. Other Sundanese dances include Topeng Sunda, Kandagan, Merak, Sisingaan, and Badawang dances. The Merak dance (peafowl dance) is a dance performed by female dancers inspired by the movements of a peafowl and its feathers blended with the classical movements of Sundanese dance, it symbolises the beauty of nature. Some dances might incorporated Pencak Silat Sundanese style movements. Because Sundanese culture are commonly developed among rice farming villages in mountainous Priangan, some dance rituals such as Buyung dance are involved in Seren Taun rice harvest festival, accompanied with angklung music. Rampak kendang on the other hand are actually synchronized kendang performances involving some coordinated dance movements. The Sundanese style of Reog dance is different than those of East Javanese Reog Ponorogo. The Reog Sunda performance combines comedy, joke, music, and funny comical movements and dances of the performers.

Unlike its Javanese counterpart, there is no clear distinction based on social hierarchy between court dances and the commoners' dances in Sundanese tradition. Most of Sundanese dance traditions and its culture are developed by common people in villages, the fact partly contributed to Sundanese history; the absence of Sundanese court culture (keraton) since the fall of Sunda Pajajaran kingdom in the late 16th century. Sundanese people however are familiar with aristocratic culture of the menak (nobles) in Priangan region, especially in Cianjur, Bandung, Sumedang and Ciamis. The musical art such as Kacapi suling demonstrate the subtlety of aristocratic Sundanese arts.

In the 17th century the Sundanese Priangan region was held under Javanese Mataram kingdom for 50 years, as the result the Sundanese culture were exposed to Javanese culture influences, such as wayang and Javanese dance styles. Wayang Golek although performed in Sundanese language, style and themes, it bears the same frame of references with Javanese Wayang Kulit tradition, that often took episodes from Ramayana or Mahabharata. The courtly Sundanese dances were developed by Sundanese nobles such as Keurseus dance, Badaya Sunda, Sarimpi Kasumedangan, Ratu Graeni, Dewi and Wayang Orang dance in Sundanese Sandiwara style.

== See also ==
- Dance in Indonesia
- Javanese dance
- Balinese dance
