= Anti-Asian racism =

Anti-Asian racism (or racism against Asians) refers to instances in which people of Asian descent are subject to racist policies, discrimination, and mistreatment from institutions or non-Asian people - typically in the Western world or in other countries outside Asia.

== Countries ==
=== Australia ===
- White Australia policy

=== Canada ===
- Chinese head tax in Canada
- Chinese Immigration Act, 1885
- Royal Commission on Chinese Immigration
- Internment of Japanese Canadians
- Pacific Coast race riots of 1907
- 1886 Vancouver anti-Chinese riots
- 1907 Vancouver anti-Asian riots
- Chinese Immigration Act, 1923

=== Uganda ===
- Expulsion of Asians from Uganda

=== United Kingdom ===
- 2024 United Kingdom riots
- Paki bashing
- Home Office 213/926 (secret deportation of East Asian sailors)

=== United States ===
- Nativism in United States politics#Asian targets
- Racism against Asian Americans, covers the history of anti-Asian racism in the United States
- Affirmative action
- Xenophobia in the United States#Asian targets
  - Anti-Chinese sentiment in the United States
    - Anti-Chinese legislation in the United States
    - Los Angeles Chinese massacre of 1871
    - San Francisco riot of 1877
    - Destruction of Chinatown, Denver
    - Tacoma riot of 1885
    - Seattle riot of 1886
    - Chinese Massacre Cove, the site of the Hells Canyon Massacre which was committed in May 1887
    - Pacific Coast race riots of 1907
    - Rock Springs massacre
    - Chinese Exclusion Act
  - Immigration Act of 1917
  - Immigration Act of 1924
  - Anti-Japanese sentiment in the United States
    - Gentlemen's Agreement of 1907
    - California Alien Land Law of 1913
    - Internment of Japanese Americans
- Asian American activism
  - Stop Asian Hate, a 2021 movement originating in the United States

==== Against East and Southeast Asians ====
- Anti-Chinese sentiment in the United States
- Anti-Japanese sentiment in the United States
- Interminority racism in the United States (racism against Asian Americans by other minority groups)

=== France ===
- Anti-Asian racism in France

== Racist incidents or perceptions ==
Racist incidents or perceptions, especially towards East or Southeast Asians, may include:

- Emasculation of Asian men against fetishizations and hypersexualisation of Asian women (yellow fever).
  - Which causes inferiority complex and internalized racism.
  - Reinforced by dangerous racial science of supposed "mongoloid race" (outdated), such as lacking of sexual dimorphism between Asian men and Asian women, as well as dealing with the aftershocks of the history of European colonisation of Southeast Asia and "white worship".
- The model minority myth fails to account for the bamboo ceiling, the difficult circumstances of poorer Asians, and their marginalization and stereotyping in the media.
  - Contradictorily being used to justify white supremacy through modes of "honorary Aryan" or "honorary whiteness" racial concepts.
  - Being used to justify racism against Black people via the model minority myth.
- Are stereotyped as cold, anti-social, robotic.
- Discrimination based on perceived foreignness or accent.
  - Being seen as a perpetual foreigner.
- Being linked to diseases such as coronavirus (see Xenophobia and racism related to the COVID-19 pandemic).
- Othered into being seen as "yellow" or being seen as the "yellow peril".
- Generalizing East Asians as monolithic and being ignorant of the multicultural populations of Southeast Asia, such as the existence of Melanesians in Southeast Asia, etc.

On the other hand, discrimination against South Asians and/or West Asians includes:

- Being seen as terrorists
- Othered into being seen as "brown", a categorization which was extended to Southeast Asians.

There has been an increase in the amount of psychological or mental distress which has been caused by the aforementioned factors. Myopic depictions of Asian cultures continues to be a problem.

Additionally, racism in Asia (racist attitudes which Asians have towards each other as well as racist attitudes which Asians have towards non-Asians) is also impacted by differences in nationality as well as regional differences.

== See also ==
- Afrophobia
- Anti-Afghan sentiment
- Anti-Arab racism
- Anti-Armenian sentiment
- Anti-Azerbaijani sentiment
- Anti-Bengali sentiment in India
- Anti-Chinese sentiment
- Anti-Europeanism
- Anti-Hungarian sentiment
- Anti-Indian sentiment
- Anti-Indonesian sentiment
- Anti-Iranian sentiment
- Anti-Japanese sentiment
- Anti-Khmer sentiment
- Anti-Korean sentiment
- Anti-Kurdish sentiment
- Anti-Malay sentiment
- Anti-Middle Eastern sentiment
- Anti-Mongolianism
- Anti-Pakistan sentiment
- Anti-Palestinianism
- Anti-Filipino sentiment
- Anti-Qing sentiment
- Anti-Romani sentiment
- Anti-Russian sentiment
- Antisemitism
- Anti-Slavic sentiment
- Anti-Thai sentiment
- Anti-Tibetan sentiment
- Anti-Turkish sentiment
- Anti-Vietnamese sentiment
- Anti-Western sentiment
- Asian American activism
- Discrimination based on skin tone
- Dusky Peril
- Ethnocentrism
- Hispanophobia
- Historical race concepts
- Index of racism-related articles
- Interminority racism in the United States
- Islamophobia
- Mormon teachings on skin color
- Nativism (politics)
- Nativism in United States politics
- Negrophobia
- Racial discrimination
- Racial hierarchy
- Racial hygiene
- Racial segregation
- Racism against African Americans
- Racism against Native Americans in the United States
- Racism by country
- Racism in Africa
- Racism in the Arab world
- Racism in Asia
- Racism in Australia
- Racism in Europe
- Racism in Israel
- Racism in Jewish communities
- Racism in Muslim communities
- Racism in North America
- Racism in South America
- Racism in the State of Palestine
- Slavery in the United States
- Tatarophobia
- White backlash
- White flight
- White nationalism
- White pride
- White supremacy
- Yellow Peril
- Xenophobia
- Xenophobia and discrimination in Turkey
- Xenophobia and racism in the Middle East
- Xenophobia and racism related to the COVID-19 pandemic
- Xenophobia in the United States
