= Racism in Thailand =

Racism in Thailand (คตินิยมเชื้อชาติ; RTGS: khotti-niyom chuea chat) is a prevalent problem but is only infrequently discussed in public. The United Nations (UN) does not define "racism"; however, it does define "racial discrimination": According to the 1965 UN International Convention on the Elimination of All Forms of Racial Discrimination, "...the term "racial discrimination" shall mean any distinction, exclusion, restriction, or preference based on race, colour, descent, or national or ethnic origin that has the purpose or effect of nullifying or impairing the recognition, enjoyment or exercise, on an equal footing, of human rights and fundamental freedoms in the political, economic, social, cultural or any other field of public life." Thailand has made two submissions to the Convention, with ongoing issues including government policy towards ethnic groups, especially the Thai Malays, and the country's lack of racial discrimination legislation.

== Siamese-Teochew rivalry issue ==
Central Thais and Thai Chinese (particularly the Teochews) both have been two predominant ethnic groups in Thailand since the founding of the Kingdom of Rattanakosin. The capital city of Bangkok itself had a large Chinese minority, while the royal court used Central Thai (Siamese) as the sole official language, and the continuous migration of Central Thai outlaws after fall of Ayutthaya have changed the ethnic composition of the country. Tensions between these two groups have not yet materialized at that point. Marriage between Siamese and Chinese citizens was not uncommon.

The tension between these two population groups became evident during the reign of King Phra Mongkut Klao, as the Chinese dominated almost the entire economy, furthermore, the increasing number of registered Central Thais were envious of the Chinese economic dominance. However, because the king favored the Chinese more than the Central Thais and did not want to reform the country's economy, he chose a hypocritical approach, implementing Thaification policy, writing articles attacking the Chinese as "Jews of the East" (despite Thai Chinese seeing themselves as the natives and blaming Kaek (Indians, Iranians, Dravidians) for being the real "Jews of the East") while publicly maintaining a positive relationship with Chinese Thais and allowing them to maintain the economy.

The conflict erupted after the Siamese Revolution, particularly during the time of Field Marshal Plaek Phibunsongkhram, who, himself being of Siamese origin, implemented discriminatory policies against Chinese people. But everything changed after the 1947 coup, and according to Wasana Wongsurawat, Thaification policy was reformed. Chinese citizens were no longer forced to assimilate into Siamese culture, and instead created a new Thai Chinese identity that they perceived as superior to native Thai culture.

== Ethnic minority issues ==
Thailand's ethnic minorities have been subjected to persecution in Thailand, especially the one million plus members of Thailand's hill tribes. They are frequently viewed as illiterate drug peddlers and opium-growers, with Thai mainstream media perpetuating this image. A 2013 article in the Bangkok Post said, "Nearly a million hill peoples and forest dwellers are still treated as outsiders—criminals even, since most live in protected forests. Viewed as national security threats, hundreds of thousands of them are refused citizenship although many are natives to the land". According to Dr Chayan Vaddanaputti of Chiang Mai University, this was not always the case:

"Earlier, they were seen by ordinary people in the lowlands as friends and trading partners in a mutually symbiotic relationship between the hills and the valleys. But growing environmental problems after Thailand's national social and economic development plans took off in the late '60s and early '70s, and an influx of Vietnamese migrants during the Vietnam War changed this relationship forever. Then they became the enemies, the 'other'. The demonization and criminalization of ethnic minorities and the perpetuation of the myth that they are non-Thai has been embedded in Thai textbooks, in Thai history and in the mainstream media."

Extrajudicial killings, torture, disappearances, and intimidation of members of Thailand's hill tribes by Thai police and military was rampant under Prime Minister Thaksin Shinawatra's "War on Drugs", which started in 2003.

The Muslim Malay Patani Kingdom of southern Thailand was incorporated into the Thai state in 1785. Being called khaek ('foreigner' or 'guest'), the Thai Malays were subjected to discrimination and political suppression, especially during the regimes of Field Marshal Plaek Phibunsongkhram and the Thaification policies of the mid-20th century. The south Thailand insurgency of the past 10 years, has repeatedly been met with brutal force by successive Thai governments, especially under the Thaksin Shinawatra administration.

== Light skin, dark skin ==
As in much of Asia, dark skin is equated with outdoor labor conditions and the lower classes. Thai culture shares this skin-tone bias with the rest of Asia. In Thailand, this bias is exacerbated by the fact that many of the wealthy Thais in Bangkok are of Chinese descent and have naturally lighter skin than the indigenous Thais from the countryside. There are no laws within the Kingdom of Thailand which outlaws racial discrimination inclusive of racist cliches known in the Western world. Unlike its neighboring nations which have been under colonialism, Thailand's heritage as an uncolonized state also shaped its existing laws unlike its Westernized counterparts after decolonization. This also includes signage promoting racial segregation as was common in the southern United States prior to the Civil Rights Act of 1964 and South Africa under apartheid. A Dunkin Donuts blackface ad aired on Thai television in 2013, causing a stir in Western media, was met for the most part with incomprehension in Thailand. The ad, says Thai cultural commentator Kaewmala, may be controversial, but "it's not a comment on black people in general, it's about concepts of beauty and social snobbery in Asia."

As most Thai people traditionally have never encountered people of African descent, prejudice toward and stereotypes of people of African descent were absorbed by Thais through the Vietnam War and literature and then movies from the West. Common brands featuring people of African descent include mops, toilet brushes, and tooth paste.

Although Thailand has incorporated certain Western ideals concerning beauty, Asian attitudes regarding skin tones have been around for a long time. Prior to contact with the West, Indian culture permeated the early civilizations of Southeast Asia, which possibly included the ideal of fair skin over darker skin. The 20 million strong Isan population, for instance, many of whom are of Laotian and Khmer descent, traditionally had darker skin and studies show that many view themselves as less desirable than those with lighter skin. Skin whitening products have proven increasingly popular in most of Asia, including Thailand and are marketed in such a way as to promote light skin as beautiful and desirable.

Yukti Mukdawijitra, a Thammasat University anthropology professor, observes that the idea that light skin is good and dark skin is bad is "embedded in Thai culture".

== Xenophobia ==
Thai attitudes towards Burma have been formed by the Thai ethnocentric media of the 1990s and a nationalistic school system, which teaches that Burma is Thailand's traditional enemy, based on repeated wars between the two from the 16th century CE onward. This negative view was further popularized in novels and films, presenting heroic Thais fighting against villainous Burmese invaders. Examples of recent films that portray this are Bang Rajan (2000), The Legend of Suriyothai (2001), King Naresuan (film series, 2007 onwards), and Siyama (2008).

Thailand has had long standing racial issues with Middle Easterners and South Asians, who collectively are also called khaek, meaning "foreigner" or "guest". "There is some debate as to whether the word bang, which literally means conceal, entrenches prejudices against Malay Muslims and Muslims more generally".

The condemnation of the 2014 Thai coup d'état by countries such as the US and Australia have given rise to an "anti-foreigner sentiment" with those Thais who are in favor of the coup. In March 2012, Ombudsman Prof. Siracha Charoenpanij, a public advocate appointed by the government, blamed foreigners for the difficulties that Thais faced in owning land, incorrectly claiming that a third of the land area of Thailand, some 100 million rai or 160,000 km^{2} of premium land, primarily in established beach resorts, was now owned by non-Thais through proxy, and obtained through corruption and the use of legal loopholes. The National Institute of Development Administration supposedly provided these numbers.

Due to an increase of Russian and Eastern European tourists in Phuket, Russians have also been the target of xenophobia, with protests and banners saying "Russians Get Out" in Phuket, and "a taxi blockade over suspected Russian transport drivers; illegal shops and businesses". Other issues include the Singapore Tourism Board organising a Songkran festival in Singapore without the endorsement of either Thai expats in Singapore, or sponsorship from the Thai authorities. Singapore was accused of "stealing 'our' (Thailand's) Songkran", with Thai officials threatening lawsuits.

In 2014, Thai officials cracked down on Chinese tourists visiting the campus of Chiang Mai University due to their using buses reserved for students, attending lectures, and eating at the student cafeteria.

Thailand and Cambodia have a long, often fractious history and are involved in an ongoing border dispute, which has led to xenophobic sentiments on both sides (see also Anti-Khmer sentiment § Thailand and Anti-Thai sentiment § Cambodia). A common historical misconception among Thais portrays a separate ethnic group from the Khmer known as the Khom, who are given credit for the achievements of ancient Khmer civilization. This allows historical Khmer influence on Thai civilization to be denied, with Khmer culture being portrayed instead as a "derivative" of Thai culture. Flare-ups in the border dispute tend to cause an increase in nationalist and anti-Cambodian sentiment, often encouraged by politicians who attempt to discredit opponents by associating them with territorial loss. After the dispute flared up into border clashes near Preah Vihear in 2008, it was made into a wedge issue by the PAD, a right-wing political movement, which accused the Samak government of "selling the motherland" due to its more conciliatory stance towards Cambodia. During the 2014 political protests by the PDRC, anti-Cambodian sentiment was also fanned by its general secretary Suthep Thaugsuban. A similar upswing in anti-Cambodian sentiment occurred following the 2025 Cambodia–Thailand border conflict, which led to some incidents of hate speech and violence against Cambodian migrant workers and caused large numbers of Cambodian laborers to leave the country due to concerns of safety.
