= Chawiwat Pramoj =

Princess of Thailand

- Her Highness, Second-class
- Born: 1836–1838
- Died: 1934–1936 (aged 80 years)
- Consorts: Worawat Supakorn; Wan (Phueang); Mun; Srean Thibodi (Pal); Phitak Ratchathan (Thong); Manomai
- Issue: Nood
- House: Pramoj
- Dynasty: Chakri
- Father: Vorachakra Dharanubhab
- Mother: Duangjai Pramoj
- Religion: Theravada Buddhism

Chawiwat Pramoj (Thai: หม่อมเจ้าฉวีวาด ปราโมช) was a daughter of Vorachakra Dharanubhab. born circa 1836–1838 to Her Excellency Duangjai Pramoj, herself a granddaughter of His Royal Highness Prince Anurak Devesh.

At age 60, M.R. Kukrit Pramoj wrote in "The Skeleton in the Closet" that his aunt experienced a period of political exile and transmmited Siamese royal dance to the Cambodian royal milieu, establishing the canonical framework upon which the contemporary Cambodian Royal Dance is founded. His private book is the only source for the claim; zero Cambodian or French sources corroborate Kukrit Pramoj’s claim.

Chawiwat’s life concluded peacefully in Siam between 1934 and 1936. She was survived by a single offspring, Nood—also known as Nus—born to her fourth consort, Srean Thibodi (Pal), the governor of Ralapuey (ระลาเปือย), who was of Chinese descent.

== Life ==
Chawiwat was formally betrothed to His Royal Highness Prince Gagananga Yukala, son of King Rama IV; however, it subsequently became apparent that the prince maintained a concubinary attachment to Sun Kakkanang Na Ayutthaya. In an attempt to enforce the dissolution of this preexisting liaison, Chawiwat’s intercessions were met with refusal.

In the context of her enmity toward the Grand Palace, Chawiwat established an affiliation with the Front Palace, a political entity engaged in sustained contention with the Grand Palace. This alignment culminated in her matrimonial union with Worawat Supakorn, progeny of Pinklao, the viceroy of Siam, thereby situating her within the nexus of the palace’s internecine rivalries. Through these connections, Chawiwat became an active participant in the dynastic and political tensions that characterized the contestation between the Grand Palace and the Front Palace.

The account given by her nephew Kukrit Pramoj in his private "gift book" Khrong Kradook Nai Thu (โครงกระดูกในตู้, lit. 'Skeleton in the Closet') distributed to friends on his 60th birthday in 1971 says this: In the aftermath of the 1860 bombardment of the Grand Palace, Chawiwat undertook the strategic relocation of valuables and retainers to the Kingdom of Cambodia, accompanied by the royal troupe of Ampha, an eminent performer from the court of King Rama II whose renown was unparalleled within the Siamese ceremonial milieu. Upon arrival, Chawiwat was accorded marked favor by Norodom of Cambodia, formerly Nak Ong Rajavadi, with whom she shared a childhood association. The reception and patronage of Ampha’s ensemble by Chawiwat facilitated the transmission and adaptation of Siamese court performance practices, which subsequently constituted the foundational corpus for the extant royal Cambodian dance tradition.

Scholar Paul Cravath, who traveled to Cambodia, Thailand, and Laos in the 1970s to study dance, wrote that no Cambodian sources corroborate Kukrit Pramoj’s claim. Dance scholar and educator Prumsodun Ok reiterated that no Khmer records corroborate Kukrit’s claim, adding “we know” its untrue from French missionary Charles-Émile Bouillevaux’s 1850’s report during the reign of Ang Duong, predating King Norodom:

“(...) in the palace of his Majesty Duong, the first of that name, there is a great deal of music and theatre; I have caught a glimpse sometimes, much in spite of myself, of his concubines who simulate battles between the ancient heroes of India.”

— Charles-Émile Bouillevaux

Ok cites research stating Thailand’s phiphat orchestra was originally called phinphat, indicating Khmer origins. He adds that a likeness to today’s pin peat is depicted in King Ang Chan’s 16th century paintings on Angkor Wat, 300 years before Norodom was crowned. This, he says, illustrates an issue in the “Thai nationalist psyche, a myth of pure Thainess that cannot exist alongside a sovereign Khmer polity.” He further added that nationalist ideology drove this intentional fabrication to “project a ‘Thainess’ back into time immemorial,” a quote by Peter Vail made 11 years before Ok addressed Kukrit's claim.

Eight years after King Norodom's death, in 1912, George Groslier (who was 17 when King Norodom died) wrote that, throughout the reign of King Norodom of Cambodia (r. 1860–1904), the Cambodian royal dance troupe was overwhelmingly constituted by Siamese performers, numbering approximately 500 dancers and instructors. Groslier further wrote that at the time of Norodom’s demise, more than 300 Siamese dancers remained resident within the Royal Palace at Phnom Penh. Groslier wrote his 1912 book with "very little actual contact with the palace dancers." Two-thirds of Norodom's troupe departed when Sisowath was crowned in 1904, with only the youngest remaining. Several of the departed dancers who had been part of Norodom's palace, most of whom were believed to be Siamese by Groslier's account, ended up in prison after being "immediately seized for debts by the Cambodian prison."

According to Kukrit Pramoj's account, Chawiwat returned to Siam in 1910 during the reign of King Rama VI. She was ordained as a nun and lived a peaceful life until her death around 1934–1936 at the age of about 80.

Kukrit Pramoj wrote that His Majesty King Norodom of Cambodia had made Chawiwat his royal consort and they had a son, Prince Norodom Pankuli (นโรดม พานคุลี). Therefore, there was a mention of "Skeleton in the Closet" that the information about Chawiwat was incorrect, by giving information that Chawiwat was not married to King Norodom Borommatheva Avatar and had nothing to do with the Front Palace crisis. In fact, Chawiwat had married 5 common Cambodian people and had only one son, Nood or Nus, who was born to Chawiwat's 4th consort Srean Thibodi (Pal) – the governor of Ralapuey (ระลาเปือย), who was of Chinese descent.
