= Dance in Thailand =

Main dramatic art form in Thailand

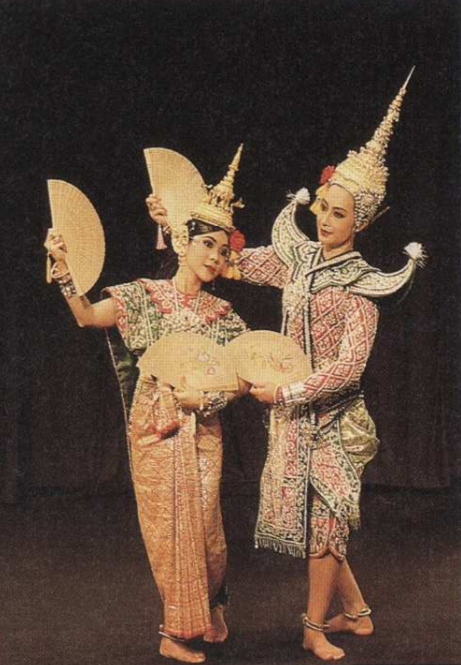
Rabam farang khu dance

Dance in Thailand (Thai: นาฏศิลป์, pronounced [nāːt.tā.sǐn] or นาฏกรรม, pronounced [nāːt.tā.kām]) is the main dramatic art form in Thailand. Thai dance can be divided into two major categories, high art (classical dance) and low art (folk dance).

== Etymology ==
The term nattasin (Thai: นาฏศิลป์) means "art of the classical Thai dance, art of drama", and the term nattakam (Thai: นาฏกรรม) means "poetry, music drama and dance", according to The Thai Official Dictionary of Royal Institute 2545 BE. Both terms are derived from Sanskrit:

- naṭa (Sanskrit: नाट) → nata, which means "dancing, acting, a dance,"
- śilpa (Sanskrit: शिल्प) → sin, meaning "artistic work,"
- karma (Sanskrit: कर्म) → kama

The term for dance in Thai, also known as the Dance of the Four Regions, is as follows:

- Northern Thailand: The term fon (Thai: ฟ้อน) in Tai languages, adopted since Sukhothai period for Lannathai Traditional Dance e.g. Fon Khan Dok. The term found in stone inscription, stone engraving and book of Tribbumikatha Buddhist Cosmology (Trai Phum Phra Ruang) composed in 1321 AD by King Maha Thammaracha I.
- Upper Northeastern Thailand: The term fon and soeng (Thai: เซิ้ง), meaning of "Dance" in Tai languages, adopted for Isan Traditional Dance e.g. Fon Oen Khwan, Soeng Bang Fai, etc.
- Lower Northeastern Thailand: The term rueam (Thai: เรือม) derived with its intonation from Old Khmer word: rapaṃ (Khmer: របាំ) → rueam 'to dance'. The term adopted in lower part of northeastern Thailand for Thai-Khmer Loeu Traditional Dance e.g. Rueam Kan Truem.
- Central Thailand and Upper Southern Thailand: There are three terms include ram, rabam (Thai: รำ, ระบำ) and ten (Thai: เต้น). The term ram, rabam are generic term for all kinds of Thai dances:
  - The term rabam derived from Old Khmer words: rapaṃ ~ rapam ~ rpam, raṃ (Khmer: រាំ, របាំ) → rabam.

When the words ten and ram combine to form tenram, it refers to "ballroom dance." These terms adopted simultaneously since 1321 AD in reign of King Maha Thammaracha I same as the term fon. The adoption of three terms are various Thai Traditional Dance e.g. Ram Baht Sakunee, Ten Kam Ram Kiew, etc.

- Lower Southern Thailand. The Thai term, taree (Thai: ตารี) borrowed from Melayu word: tari → taree, and has been adopted specifically for the Thai-Malays Traditional Dance, e.g. Taree Kipas Dance Thai version.

The term drama in Thai words such as khon are derived from the Tamil word: kōṉ (Tamil: கோன்) → khon, which means "king and god, a king, a ruler". The word is also present as a Bengali and Iranian word. It is also identical with the terms kan, khan or khasan in Turko-Mongolian languages. The Thai term khon is adopted particularly for the Ramakien Thai version from the Indian epic Ramayana.

The Thai term lakon (also spelt: lakorn, lakhon) is derived from Javanese word lakon (Javanese: ꦭꦏꦺꦴꦤ꧀), a derivation of lakuan, lagon and laku, means "to walk, to act, to run". According to Thai historian Prince Damrong Rajanubhab, it is hypothesized that the term lakon originated from the name of Nakhon Si Thammarat—the Javanese culture during the Ayutthaya period, where the dance and drama were first introduced.

== History ==
=== Origin ===
Thai dance originated from the culture of the ancient Tamils—Kumeru people in southern India thousands of years ago, which modeled the Natya Shastra’s 108 puppets from the Tandava sculpture in the Nataraja Temple, Chidambaram to worship the Nataraja.

Archaeological evidences that have been discovered and related to the origin of Thai dance, such as stuccos and sculptures dating back to 6th–11th century in Dvaravati era, were discovered at the following archaeological sites, Khok Mai Den and Chansen archaeological sites in Nakhon Sawan, Ban Khu Bua archaeological site in Ratchaburi, and Prasat Phimai in Nakhon Ratchasima, in the late Dvaravati era; all of these are dance pose models that have been influenced mainly by Indian culture.

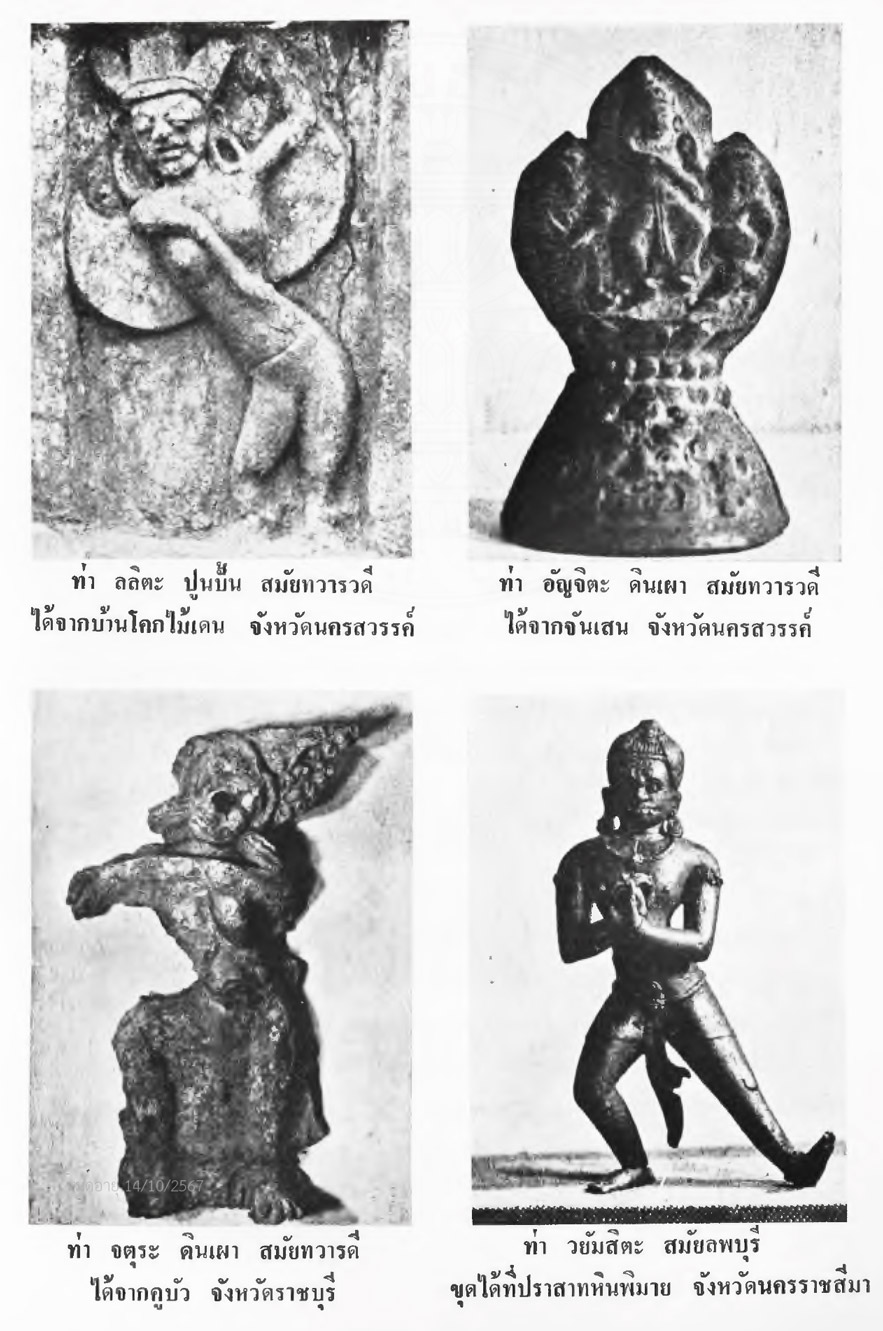
Stuccos and sculptures based on the Natya Shastra scriptures, discovered in Thailand, date back to the Dvaravati era.

As time passed, Thai dance was developed until the identity of the original dance was erased until it became a unique identity of Thai dance. Even cultures, musical instruments, and songs from India, China, Malay, Mon, Khmer, Khom minorities in the Chao Phraya River Basin, and Myanmar, when they came to have influence, were all improved and evolved until they became exquisitely Thai in a way that was different from other nations.

=== Nanzhao Period ===
From 748, the Tai state of Nanzhao had a martial art of dance called Fon Joeng. It is an art of various movements of Thai dance for the belief ceremonies of the northern Thai people and is a martial art for self-defense to show the style of fighting both offensive and defensive. The Fon Joeng has many kinds of drum rhythms and has been passed down from the Nanzhao Period to the Ngoenyang, Lanna, and Sukhothai periods, respectively. Fon Joeng still exists in the present as a recreational dance and one part of the history of Muay Thai.

=== Sukhothai Period ===
Archaeological evidence of Thai dance in the Sukhothai period shows that it already existed. However, there is no clear evidence that Thai dance was performed as a story but rather as local folk entertainment, such as the entertainment during the Kaṭhina festival, as stated in King Ramkhamhaeng's inscription.

The Ram Khamhaeng Inscription broadly mentioned Thai dance, in which singing and dancing in any form could be performed freely in the royal processions. When the Thai people of Sukhothai got involved with some tribes with Indian cultural influences, such as the Mon, and Khom ethnic minorities of the Chao Phraya River basin, Thai dance began to appear as having a structured form of story performance.

The Sumon Kut Inscription No. 8, aged 1360, also mentioned Thai dance called Ram (to dance; general word for dance), Rabam (to dance; short choreographed non-narrative dance pieces), Ten (to dance), and Len (to play), along with musical instruments, the same as mentioned in the Sukhothai literature, Traibhumikatha (composed in 1345). Although those inscriptions and the literature do not clearly state what kind of dance it is, these evidences show that Thais were well familiar with singing, playing, and dancing in the Sukhothai period at that time.

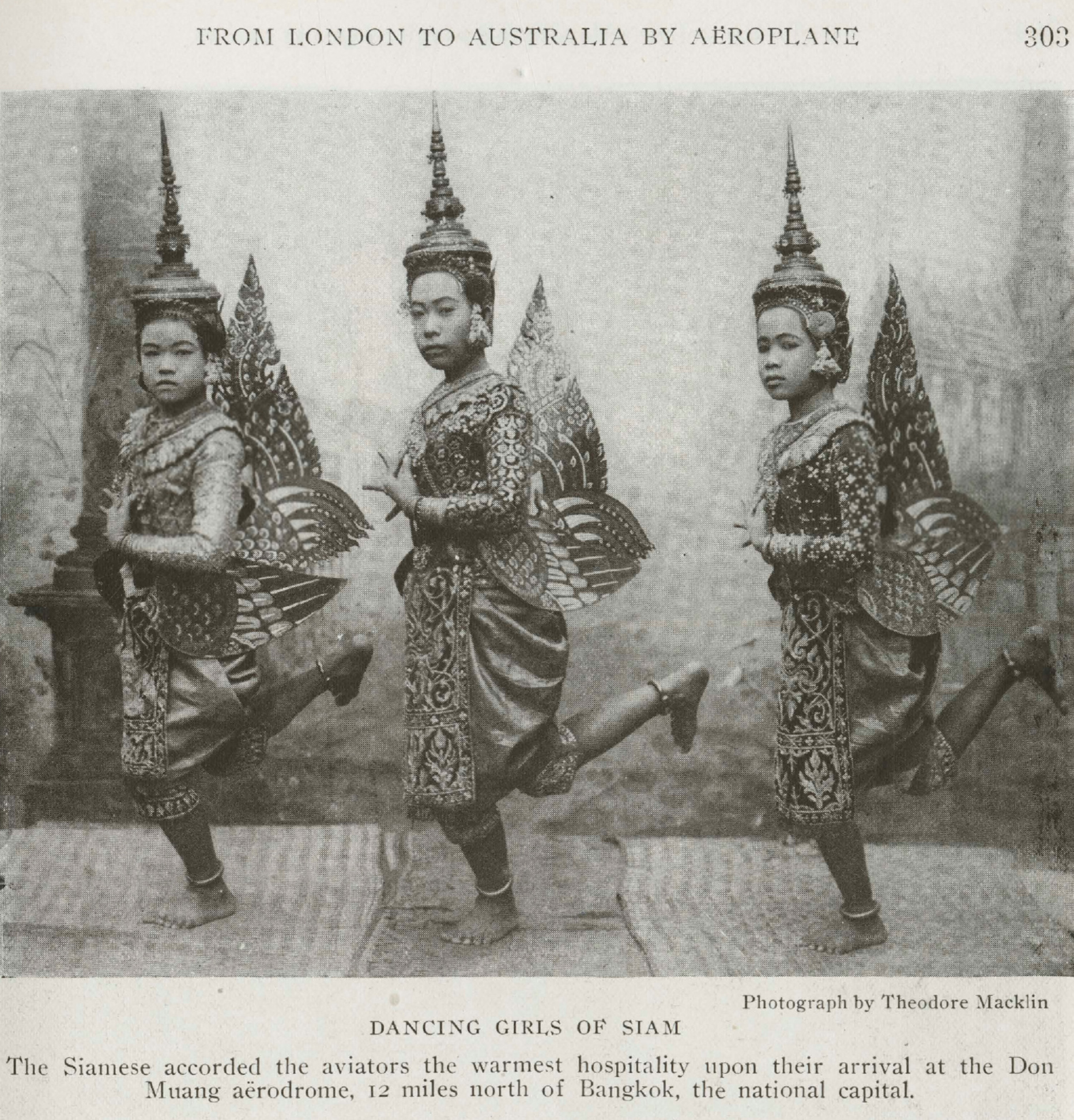
Dancing Girls of Siam in 1919, in which Siam performed the classical Thai dance to welcome Sir Ross Macpherson Smith's pilots at Don Mueang Aerodome. Photograph by Theodore Macklin (1921), the National Geographic Society, Washington, D.C.

In fact, in the Sukhothai period of the 13th–14th centuries, the Thais assertively rejected the authority of the Khmer empire.

=== Ayutthaya Period ===
Ayutthaya was a pre-existing city and home of Mon and later Siamese that aged older than the Sukhothai kingdom, prior to the establishment of the Ayutthaya Kingdom.

Thai dance in the Ayutthaya period was influenced heavily by Indian cultures different from the Sukhothai period due to its being home to various ethnic groups. Simon de la Loubère recorded the society of Ayutthaya in his famous work, Du royaume de Siam, that there were forty different ethnic groups. The Moors alone have as many as 10 ethnic groups. Nicolas Gervaise also said more than one third of the Ayutthaya residents are foreigners; even the Palace Law Chulasakarat 720 (enacted in 1358) of the Ayutthaya royal court mentioned Indian, Khmer, Lao, Khom minorities in the Chao Phraya River basin, Burmese, HMong, Mon, Muslims, Jang, Chinese, Chams, Javanese, and all other ethnics.

According to the Ayutthaya Royal Palace Law, under the entertainment chapter, stated that there were len, ram, rabam, ra-beng, kulati-mai, and Nang yai. Simon de la Loubère also mentioned three types of performances: dance (rabam), drama (lakhon), and masked drama-dance (khon).

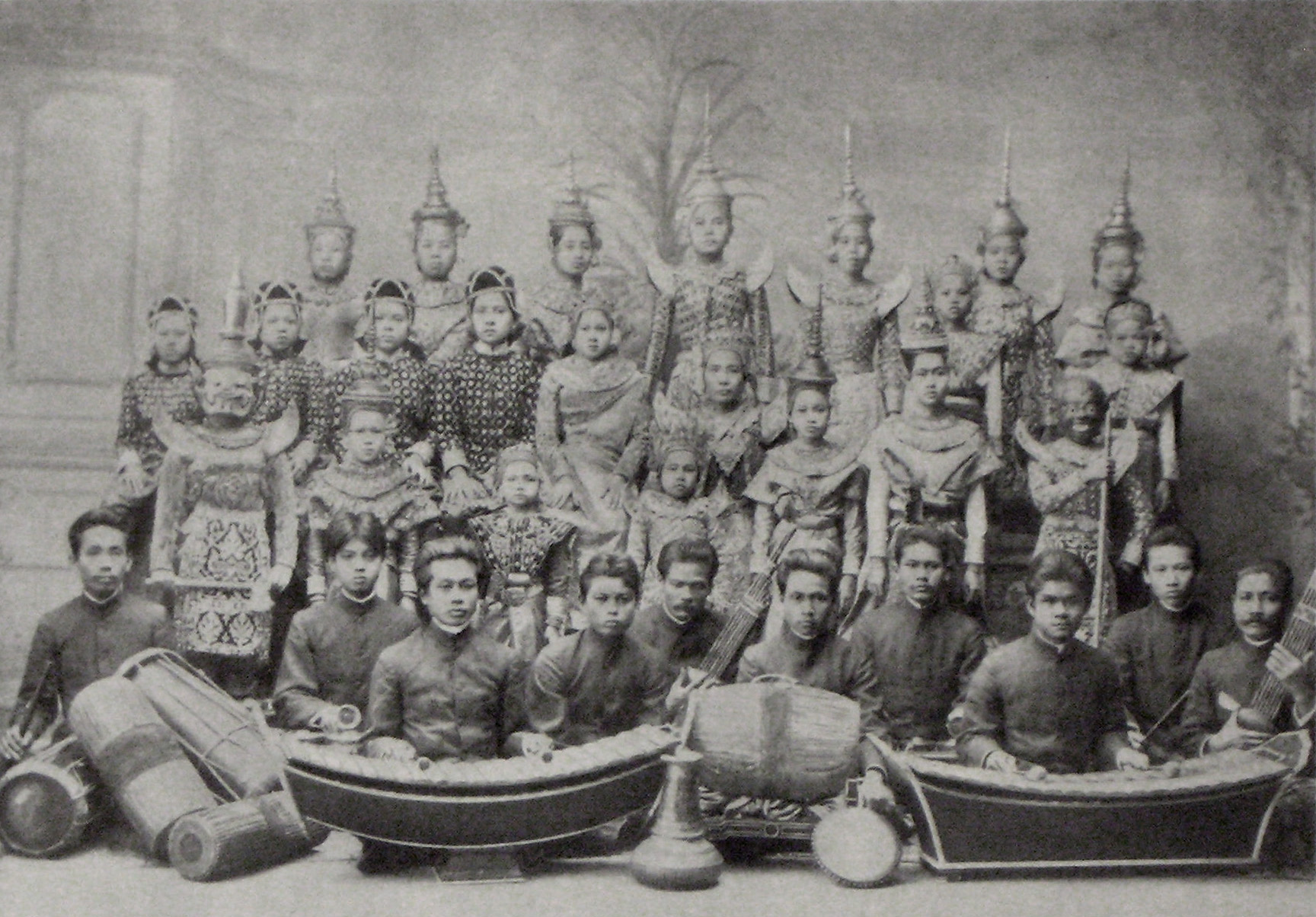
Group of Siamese theatre in 1900 performed in Berlin, Germany.

There are three genres of drama-dance: Lakhon chatri, Lakhon nok, and Lakhon nai, of which Lakhon chatri is the oldest form of Thai dance and closely related to the Menora. Ram and Rabam are forms of dance that have existed since the Sukhothai period, as appears in various Sukhothai inscriptions and literature. The Khon in the Ayutthaya period originated around the 11th century CE, which is modeled heavily on the Hindu epic, Ramayana, to the Thai version, Ramakien (Glory of Rama).

Thai dance was later mixed with the Khmer culture after Ayutthaya sacked the Angkor Thom in 1431 in the reign of King Borommarachathirat II, which integrated an influx of Khmer cultures—Hinduism−influenced into the Siamese court. In time passed, Thai dance in this period was created by combining various dance forms until it improved into Ayutthaya Royal Court dance. When considering the social context of that period, Thai dance in the Ayutthaya period is considered to be the main culture among ethnic diversity. The Khmer culture of Angkor Thom was completely lost after Ayutthaya annexed Sukhothai in 1438 as a result.

According to Surapone Virulrak, Thai performance art took shape during the Ayutthaya period. At this time, Chak nak Dukdamban, a "ceremony depicting the churning of the ocean to create the immortal spirit", was performed on special occasions. This ceremony drew from the Indian epic of the Mahābhārata. Virulrak states, "These performing arts were gradually developed into Khon (masked play), lakhon nok (public dance drama) and lakhon nai (court dance drama) during the Late Ayutthaya Period (1456-1767)", adding, "this period also enjoyed various imported performing arts from neighbouring countries." According to Paul Cravath, this ceremony performed by Khmer dancers is also depicted in bas-reliefs at Angkor Wat in Cambodia and could have been the forefather of Khon.

Aside from folk and regional dances (such as southern Thailand's Indian-influenced Manora dance), the two major forms of Thai classical dance drama are Khon and lakhon nai. In the beginning, both were exclusively court entertainments and it was not until much later that a popular style of dance theatre, likay, evolved as a diversion for the common folk who had no access to royal performances.

When considering historical evidence and various archaeological studies, together with the consideration of dance postures in the works of Prince Damrong Rajanubhab, The Dance Manual, it is found that Ayutthaya drama originated from Manora, which were popular in southern Ayutthaya. In particular, the Lakhon Chatri, which was influenced by Indian and Javanese cultures, was the origin in the South. It was later classified as the Lakhon Nok and the Lakhon Nai. Even the term lakhon was borrowed from the Javanese, Lakon, (Javanese: ꦭꦏꦺꦴꦤ꧀, romanized: lakon) perhaps the Malay, lakhan.

Evidence showing that Srivijaya culture spread from the Malay Peninsula to Chaiya (modern Nakhon Si Thammarat) and other regions, including the story of Inao (Thai version from Panji tales), Nang yai, and Likay into Ayutthaya from the southern region, is the Borobudur, built in the 9th century CE in the Srivijaya period.

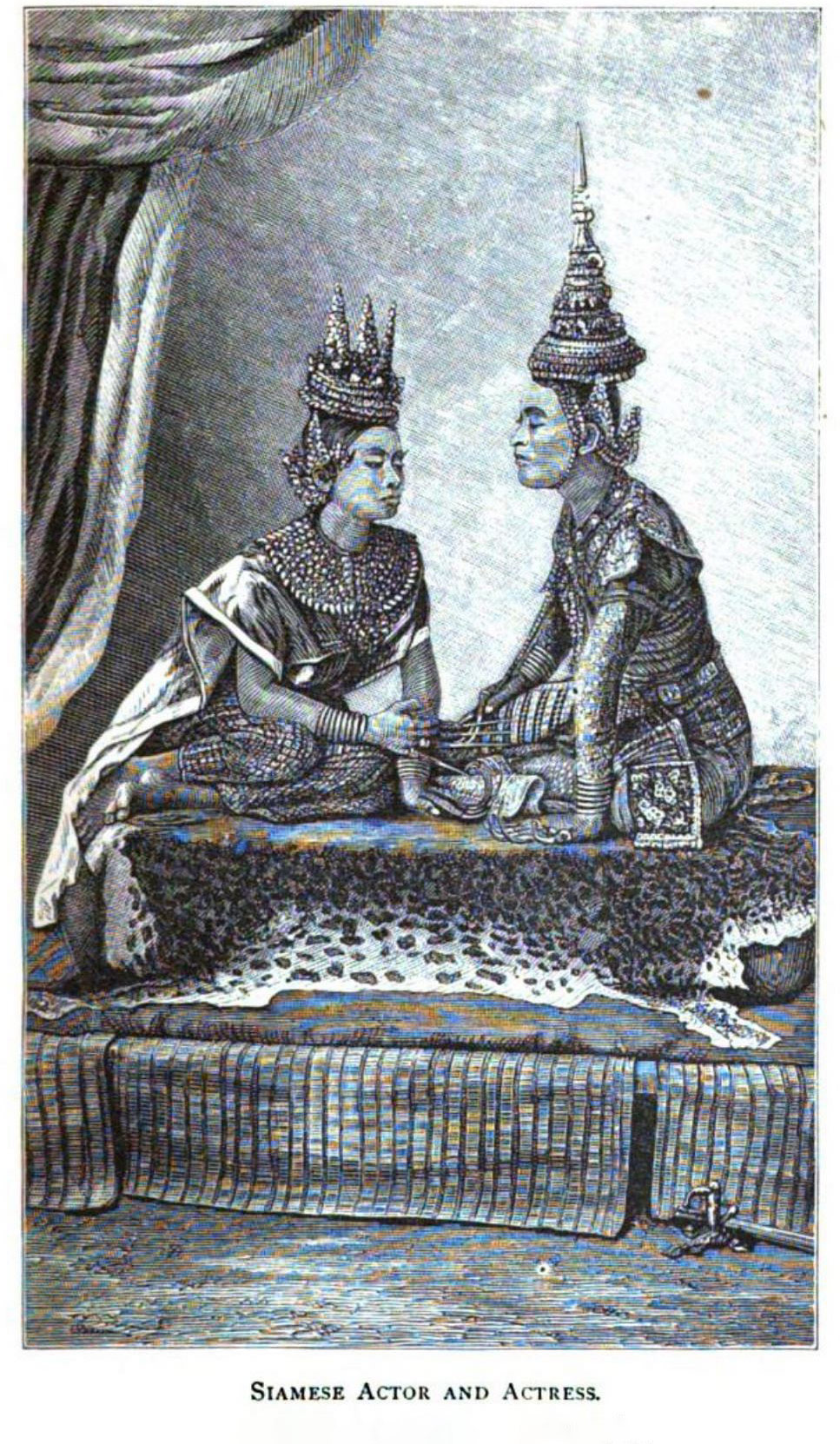
Portrait of Siamese actor and actress in Siamese Literature and Art, illustrated in 1870 by Anna H. Leonowens in the reign of King Rama V from the book, The English Governess at the Siamese Court (1873). The portrait sketched from the photograph taken by Francis Chit.

Since the Ayutthaya period, Thai dance evolved after being mixed with multiple cultures of the northern (Sukhothai) and southern (Chaiya) cities, the Khmer of Angkor Thom, and many local ethnic diversity; it evolved and improved both dance, drama, and Khon throughout the period to be more refined and beautiful until it became a unique culture of the Ayutthaya royal court, including traditions, local amusements, and even costumes. The clothing and accessories of Thai dance in the Ayutthaya period flourished greatly during the reign of King Borommakot. Many literary works and plays related to dance were created, such as Ramakien, Inao, and other dances outside and inside the royal court.

In 1768, after the second fall of Ayutthaya, many Siamese actors and actresses for the Lakhon Nai drama disappeared. Most drama and the ramakien works were all lost in abundance when the Ayutthaya was sacked by the Burmese in 1767. Some fled to cities that were not lost to the Burmese troops, e.g., Phitsanulok and Nakhon Sri Thammarat, while others were rounded up and taken to Myanmar. However, the Lakhon Nok that was widely performed outside the Ayutthaya court still remains in large numbers. There are still Siamese people who have witnessed Lakhon Nai drama in the Ayutthaya royal court, such as Princess Pinthawadi, the daughter of King Borommakot, who lived until the Rattanakosin period and was the one who transmitted ancient customs and royal ceremonies to the Rattanakosin royal courts.

Hence, ramakien and khon in the Rattanakosin era were reproduced by King Rama I from the Ramayana versions of Hindi, Tamil, and Bengali, which are not the same version of Ayutthaya.

==== Foreigner record ====
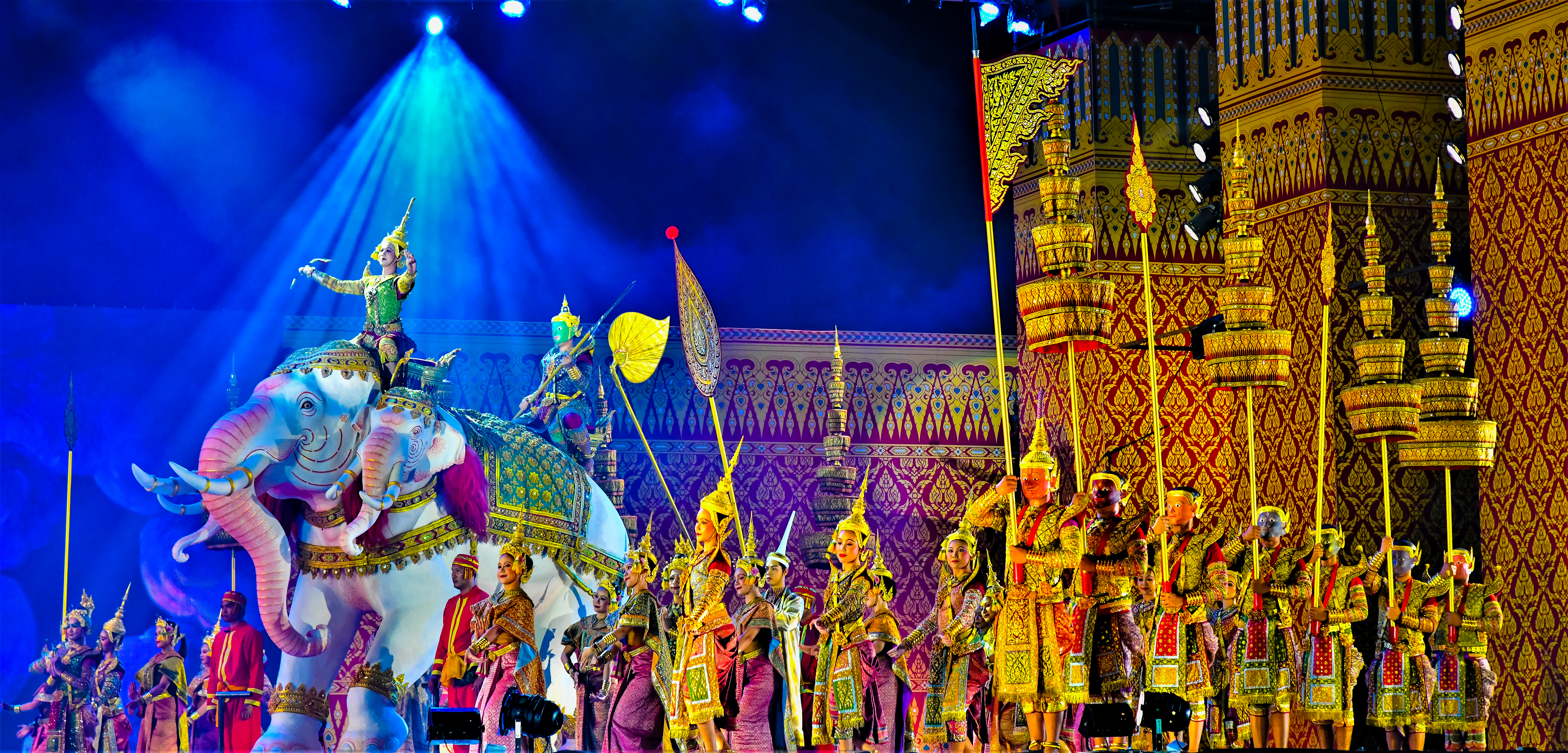
Khon performance

The first detailed European record of Khon and other Thai classical dances was made during the Ayutthaya Kingdom. The tradition and styles employed are almost identical to the Thai traditions we still see today. Historical evidence establishes that the Thai art of stage plays was already perfected by the 17th-century. Louis XIV, the Sun King of France, had a formal diplomatic relation with Ayutthaya's King Narai. In 1687, France sent the diplomat Simon de la Loubère to record all that he saw in the Siamese Kingdom and its traditions. In his famous account Du Royaume de Siam, La Loubère carefully observed the classic 17th-century theatre of Siam, including an epic battle scene from a Khon performance, and recorded what he saw in great detail:

The Siamese have three sorts of Stage Plays: That which they call Cone [Khon] is a figure dance, to the sound of the violin and some other instruments. The dancers are masked and armed and represent rather combat than a dance. And though everyone runs into high motions, and extravagant postures, they cease not continually to intermix some word. Most of their masks are hideous and represent either monstrous Beasts or kinds of Devils. The Show which they call Lacone is a poem intermix with Epic and Dramatic, which lasts three days, from eight in the morning till seven at night. They are histories in verse, serious, and sung by several actors always present, and which do only sing reciprocally.... The Rabam is a double dance of men and women, which is not martial, but gallant ... they can perform it without much tyring themselves, because their way of dancing is a simple march round, very slow, and without any high motion; but with a great many slow contortions of the body and arms.

Of the attires of Siamese Khon dancers, La Loubère recorded that: "[T]hose that dance in Rabam, and Cone, have gilded high and pointed. It was introduced by Persian Lombok hat in King Naraya reign. but which hang down at the sides below their ears, which are adorned with counterfeit stones, and with two pendants of gilded wood."

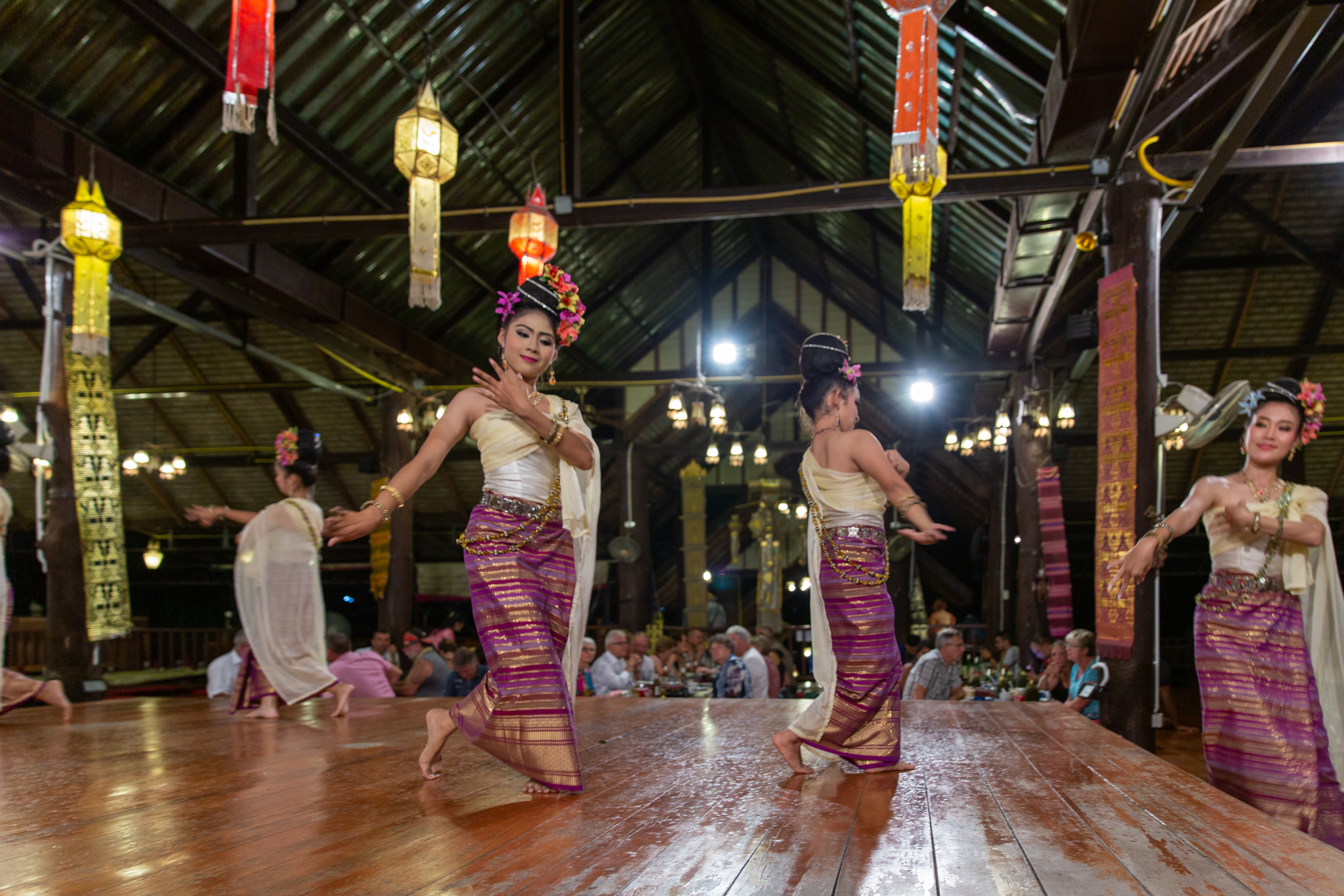
Dancers in traditional costumes perform a courtship dance.

La Loubère also observed the existence of muay Thai and muay Lao, noting that they looked similar (i.e., using both fists and elbows to fight), but the hand-wrapping techniques were different.

The accomplishment and influence of Thai art and culture, developed during the Ayutthaya Period, on neighboring countries was evident in the observation of Captain James Low a British scholar of Southeast Asia, during the early Rattanakosin Era:

The Siamese have attained to a considerable degree of perfection in dramatic exhibitions — and are in this respect envied by their neighbours the Burmans, Laos, and Cambojans who all employ Siamese actors when they can be got.

=== Thonburi period ===
In 1768–81, Thai dance was greatly revived by King Taksin and Thais. There was evidence that there are still performances of Lakhon Nai and Lakhon Nok, both actors and actresses, in the capital and outside major cities, such as Nakhon Ratchasima, Chiang Mai, Fang or Sawangkhaburi (now Utaradit), and Phitsanulok during Taksin's reunification of Siam. There also were collections of dramatic compositions composed during the Ayutthaya period—more than 10 stories.

In 1769, in the early period after the establishment of Thonburi Kingdom, King Taksin gathered many scattered actors and actresses. There were actors from Nakhon Si Thammarat sent by the governor of Pattani to King Taksin, and a Thai dance performance was organized at that time on the occasion of the consecration of the Buddha's relics at Wat Phra Mahathat in Nakhon Si Thammarat. When King Taksin led his army to siege the assembly of Chao Phra Fang, he organized a Thai dance performance in Fang and Phitsanulok to celebrate the cities after his victory.

Prince Damrong Rajanubhap stated that the actors and actresses of Nakhon Si Thammarat were members of the Lakhon Nai who had fled from Ayutthaya.

Throughout the reign of King Taksin, he composed five additional episodes (Four Folding-book manuscripts in total) of the Thai version, Ramakien. He ordered the establishment of several royal drama theaters for training. There were performances of the Khon, Ramakien, Inao, and royal drama competitions in the Emerald Buddha celebration in 1782 near the end of the reign.

Meanwhile, at the Burmese royal court, the royal family members of the Ayutthaya court and Thais who were taken to Burma brought the Thai dance to the Burmese court, resulting in Burmese dance being greatly influenced by the Ayutthaya. However, it was an opportunity to be able to revive Thai dance during the Thonburi period until the Rattanakosin period because Thai dance can be traced back to the Thai-Burmese multiculturalism in another way.

== Classical dance drama ==
=== Lakhon ===
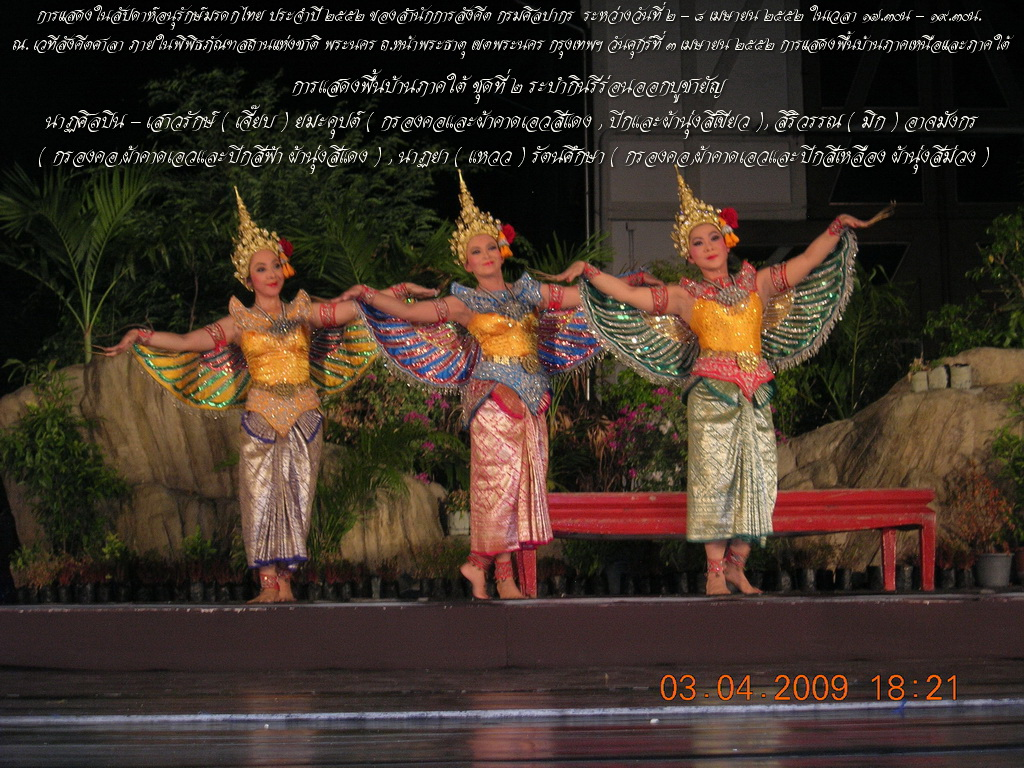
A Lakhon Chatri dance excerpt from the story of Manohara

Lakhon features a wider range of stories than Khon, including folk tales and Jataka stories. Dancers are usually female who play both male and female roles and perform as a group rather than representing individual characters. Lakhon draws inspiration primarily from the Ramakien (Thai adaptation of Hindu epic Ramayana). Percussion instruments and piphat, a type of woodwind, accompany the dance. Thai literature and drama draw great inspiration from Indian arts and legends.

=== Khon ===
Khon is the most stylized form of Thai dance. It is performed by troupes of non-speaking dancers, the story being told by a chorus at the side of the stage. Choreography follows traditional models rather than attempting to innovate. Most Khon performances feature episodes from the Ramakien. Costumes are dictated by tradition, with angels, both good and bad, wearing colored masks.

=== Fon ===
Fon (Thai: ฟ้อน; RTGS: fon) is a form of folk dance accompanied by the folk music of the region. The first fon originated in the northern region of Thailand. It was designed and taught by Chao Dararasami of Chiang Mai. Since then, a variety of fon came into practice, featuring the music and style of each province, such as the fon lep (Thai: ฟ้อนเล็บ; RTGS: fon lep) fingernail dance from Chiang Mai and the fon ngiew from Chiang Rai, which was influenced by Burmese music and costume.

Fon is divided into three types:

- Fon lep (fingernail dance): A northern Thai dance style. Each dancer wears six-inch-long brass fingernails. The long fingernails accentuate the finger movement of each dancer. Dancers wear their hair in a chignon-style with a yellow jasmine flower tiara.
- Fon tian (candle dance): A performance consists of eight dancers, each carrying candles. Dancers are in pairs, one pair to each side. They wear full-length sarongs and jackets with a matching shoulder cloth. This dance is always held at night.
- Fon ngiew (scarf dance): A dance performed at a happy event. The dance is similar to the fon lep but the dance is faster and more fun. Each dancer wears a yellow flower tiara, jong kra bane, and sabai.

== Connections between Thai classical dance and the neighbouring countries ==
=== Myanmar ===
The two golden periods of Burmese literature were the direct consequences of the Thai literary influence. The first transmission happened during the two-decade period (1564–83), in which the Toungoo Dynasty briefly managed to subject Siam as its vassal state. This conquest incorporated many Thai elements into Burmese literature. the most evident ones were the yadu or yatu (ရာတု), an emotional and philosophic verse and the yagan (ရာကန်) genre. The next transmission of Thai literary influence to Burma happened in the aftermath of the fall of Ayutthaya Kingdom in 1767. After the second conquest of Ayutthaya (Thailand), many Siamese royal dancers and poets were brought back to the court of Konbaung. Ramakien, the Thai version of Ramayana (ရာမယန), was introduced and was adapted in Burmese where it is now called Yama Zatdaw. Burmese literature during this period was therefore modelled after the Ramayana, and dramatic plays were patronised by the Burmese court.

=== Cambodia ===
Interviews given by HRH Princess Norodom Buppha Devi and Em Theay regarding the Cambodian Royal Dances and influence from the Siamese style
- By Norodom Buppha Devi
- By Em Theay

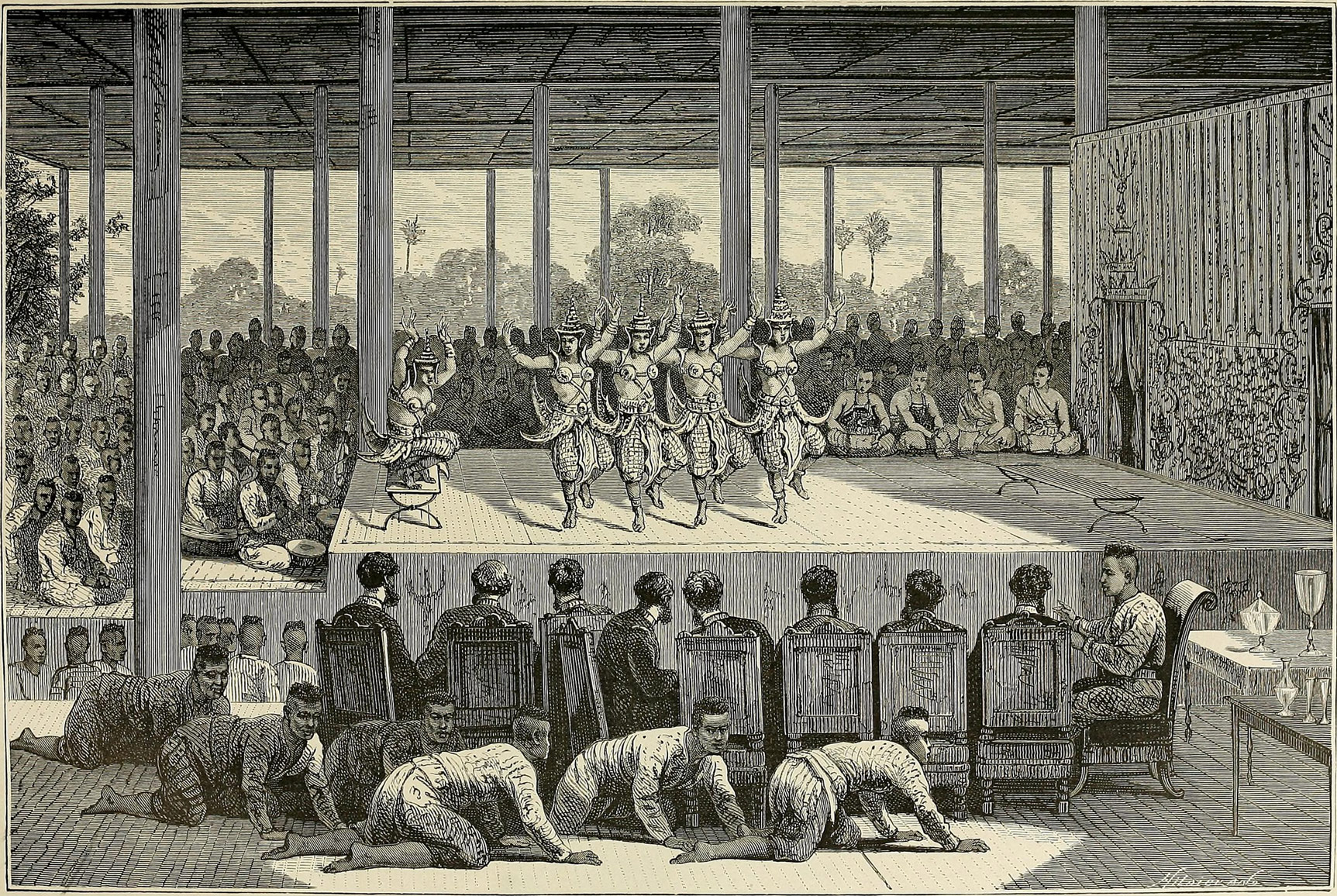
The Asia Society provides an explanation for the illustration: "At a court modeled on Bangkok's, Norodom I, great-grandfather of Sihanouk, greeted French visitors in 1866 with Thai dancers." Louis Delaporte, the author of this sketch who witnessed the performance in the newly built Phnom Penh ram rong, never refers to the dancers as “Siamese” either in the caption or at any other point, ever.

The earliest mention of Cambodian classical dance appeared in the 7th century CE in a Sanskrit inscription. Maurel, a French historian explains a process of cultural influence of the Siamese nirat (poetry) between Cambodia and Siam as follows:

"From the close of the eighteenth century and through the nineteenth century, a number of Khmer pages, classical women dancers, and musicians studied with Thai ajarn (masters or teachers) in Cambodia. The presence of this Thai elite in Cambodia contributed to the development of strong Thai cultural influence among the Khmer upper classes. Moreover, some members of the Khmer royal family went to the Thai court and developed close relations with well-educated Thai nobility, as well as several court poets. Such cultural links were so powerful that, in some fields, one might use the term 'Siamization' in referring to the processes of cultural absorption at the Khmer court at that time. And it is in this context that one can view the expansion of the Thai nirat into Cambodia.."

During King Norodom’s time, the Khmer royal court would only stage dramatic performances in Thai (language). Later, in Sisowath peroid, plays were performed in both Thai and Khmer languages. Both Lakorn Nok and Lakorn Nai, especially Siamese-court plays plays from Inoa to Phra Apai Manee, were performed in the Cambodian Capital.

Meanwhile, after the second fall of Ayutthaya in the Burmese–Siamese War (1765–1767), most of the royal court dances of the Ayutthaya period were completely lost. From the Thonburi and Rattanakosin eras, a lot of Siamese verses and dramatic compositions were reproduced and recomposed again in the period of King Taksin and King Rama I.

In Theatre In Southeast Asia (1967), James R.Brandon, a specialist and professor of Asian Theatre, wrote:

" It is popular to claim that the dance style of Angkor's apsaras of the twelfth century is perfectly preserved in the Royal Cambodian Ballet dance style. Unfortunately, this is romantic nonsense. A world of difference separates the elaborately costumed, chaste, and refined Cambodian dancers of today from the bare-breasted, hip-swinging beauties of Angkor. Between the thirteenth and the nineteenth centuries, the Thai developed Khmer dance and music in distinctive new directions. Present-day Cambodian dance-drama is virtually a copy of this Thai creation from earlier Khmer forms. Up until World War II, the Royal Cambodian Ballet performed its classic repertory in the Thai language; only since the war have the Thai play scripts been translated into Cambodian"

Professor of Dance Katie Stahl-Kovell, Ph.D, criticizes this take, and disagrees with Brandon's methods and conclusions, saying in 2015 that, “Brandon’s narrative orientalizes Khmers, ignores Khmer oral accounts of court dance, and privileges concrete evidence that is difficult to find when studying an ephemeral artform such as dance.” Stahl-Kovell goes on to say “though Brandon may wish it,” the impermanence of dance means it cannot “effectively be documented.” She concludes:

Brandon’s attempt to fully document hard evidence of dance is a ubiquitously Western approach to dance and is emblematic of the pitfalls of 1960s anthropology.

"Poses,” “gestures,” and “movements” present in modern Thai (and Cambodian) dance bear likeness to depictions in ancient Khmer art, underscoring an enduring Khmer impact on Thai dance. Even the Thai words for dance (ระบำ or ‘rabam,’ and รำ or ‘ram’) come from Old Khmer. Art historian, journalist, and author Denise Heywood puts it:

“It is said that Siamese dancers emulated Khmer movements and Khmer dancers adopted Siamese costumes.”

Cambodia's King Ang Duong, who came to the throne in 1841, is known to have taken refuge in the court of Siam. He decided to set a new standardization for his own court dance, inspired by the dance he had seen in Thailand. He also adapted the costumes of Siamese models.

Siam was not exceptional in this regard:

"Cravath notes that the king [Norodom] returned with musicians after his 1872 visit to Manila; that same year, a visit to Singapore saw his return with ‘Malayan coachmen’ [who resided] in Phnom Penh under his protection; the daughter of one of these eventually became a leading dancer in the royal troupe and subsequently one of the most respected teachers of princess roles.' All these artists were given access to Khmer classical dance lessons, additionally performing dances and songs from their own traditions for the entertainment of the king.”

King Ang Duong's changes may have been an effort to update the dance and make it more palatable to French sensibilities:

First off, he separated male and female dancers into separate troupes and commanded that they each be able to enact dances and dramas without depending on each other. This has resulted in the modern female tradition we associate with the royal court today and the modern all‑male masked tradition of khaol, which is associated with villages and only performs excerpts of the Reamker. Secondly, he covered the half‑clad bodies of the dancers with heavy costumes. This decision reflected an interaction with 'modern' French values as well as the conservative ideas of the Thammayut branch of Theravada Buddhism, which was developed by both Thai and Khmer monks in Bangkok.”

On his 60th birthday, Kukrit Promaj distributed a private "gift-book" to friends saying that in 1868–1910, his Aunt Chawiwat, also known as Princess Chawiwat Pramoj, daughter of Siamese Prince Vorachak Tharanubhab, took the Siamese Royal dance and Siamese troupe of Chao Chorm Manda Ampa [a high-ranking Siamese court lady], all accessories, along with the Siamese Piphat ensemble, to the court of the Norodom Palace in the Fifth Reign of King Rama V. There are no Cambodian sources corroborating Kukrit Pramoj’s claim. In fact, an 1850 account by French missionary Charles-Émile Bouillevaux describes lively dance and music performances in Ang Duong's palace at least two decades before Pramoj said his aunt brought royal dance and music ensemble to Cambodia:

“...There is a great deal of music and theatre; I have caught a glimpse sometimes, much in spite of myself, of his concubines who simulate battles between the ancient heroes of India.”

George Groslier wrote that, throughout the reign of King Norodom of Cambodia (r. 1860–1904), the Cambodian royal dance troupe almost entirely consisted of Siamese performers, numbering approximately 500 dancers and instructors. At the time of Norodom's demise, more than 300 Siamese dancers were resident in the Royal Palace at Phnom Penh before 2/3rds exited the palace as Sisowath was crowned the same year. Some former dancers were incarcerated over accrued debts. Just some 100 dancers, the youngest, remained for King Sisowath's 1904 crowning.

In Cambodian history—Le Royaume du Cambodge (1883) by Jean MOURA (1827–85), a French administrator, it is mentioned that Siamese females provided recruits of Siamese dancers to the ballet corps of King Norodon's palace:

Les femmes siamoises sont charmantes; elles sont grandes généralement et bien faites; elles fournissent des recrues appréciées au corps de ballet du palais du roi Norodon, et ce sont des Siamois qui, moyennant finances, se chargent de ce recrutement en allant, à leurs risques et périls, faire des chargements de filles à Bangkok.

(Translation): The Siamese women were generally attractive, tall, and beautiful. They assisted in recruiting young Siamese female dancers for the ballet troupe to perform in the palace of King Norodom, and the Siamese took upon themselves the responsibility of taking the errand at their own risk to bring the shipload of dancers back to Bangkok with a charge.

— Jean MOURA (1883).

George Groslier (1887–1945), a French civil servant who wrote his book Danseuses Cambodgiennes Anciennes et Modernes based on “very little actual contact with palace dancers” and while Sisowath “seems to have done very little” to deliver Groslier a complete picture of the dance troupe’s reality, wrote in said book that:

Les danseuses cambodgiennes étaient si bien parties de leur malheureux pays que les derniers rois khmers, jusqu’à Norodom, avaient des troupes presque en totalité siamoises. Tous les professeurs des cinq cents "lokhon" de Norodom étaient siamoises. A sa mort, il y avait plus de trois cents actrices thaï au palais de Phnom Penh. De nos jours encore, l’ensemble des professeurs, moins deux, est siamois!...

(Translation): The Cambodian dancers were so well out of their unfortunate country (after the sack of Angkor) that the last Khmer kings, up to Norodom, had almost entirely Siamese troupes. All the teachers of the five hundred 'lokhon' of Norodom were Siamese. At his death, there were more than three hundred Thai actresses in the palace of Phnom Penh. Even today (under the reign of H. M. Sisowath) all the teachers, minus two, are Siamese! ….

— George Groslier (1913).

Groslier maintained that the dance itself and "gestures" are Khmer in origin, "preserved" by the Siamese:

Depuis la ruine d’Angkor,depuis que les esclaves sont les maîtres,depuis que tout ce qui était puissance, orgueil n’est plus rien, les Siamois vainqueurs ont conservé, dépositaires respectueux et gardiens adorateurs, les fragiles «lokhon ». Mais si le même rituel, les mêmes gestes demeurent,— parce qu’ils sont immortels, — les costumes subirent l’influence des nouveaux maîtres.

(Translation) Since the ruin of Angkor, since slaves became masters, since all that was power and pride became nothing, the victorious Siamese have preserved, as respectful custodians and adoring guardians, the fragile "lokhon." But while the same rituals and gestures remain,— because they are immortal — the costumes have been influenced by the new masters.

— George Groslier (1913)

Author and ballet practitioner Prumsodun Ok wrote:

"Scholars such as Paul Cravath believe the Churning of the Ocean of Milk, as carved onto the walls of Angkor Wat, is an actual depiction of khaol, or male masked dance. He believes the performance was enacted during coronation ceremonies to assert the king’s role as the central force presiding over the kingdom and the cosmos it represented, whose harmonious control of these forces produced the apsara, celestial dancers, themselves. Cravath notes that Thai dance experts believe this ritual was introduced to Thailand by way of Khmer artists, where it was known as the len dukdamban and performed as late as the reign of King Chulalongkorn (1868 – 1911).”

In 1958, King Norodom Sihanouk shared the following with Malcolm MacDonald:

“King Sihanouk propounded to me a theory about the dancers costumes. He told me that in the court of the ancient Khmer empire dancers were lightly clad, like the half-naked apsaras.…Then the dancers were forgotten when the court fled Angkor, in their private quarters, so they fell in the hands of the Thais who took them with other splendid booty to their own capital of Ayuthia…The Thais’ idea of costume, however, was different from that of the Khmers. They were people originating from the cold north in Yunnan, and were used to wear a lot of clothes.”

In 1968, Frederick P. Munson (et al.) wrote of the Royal Ballet of Cambodia:

"The costumes and crowns used by the Cambodian palace dancers show an unmistakable Thai influence, but there is one notable exception. Every item of jewelry worn by the dancers is authentic. The bracelets and anklets are gold studded with precious stones, and the crowns for male roles are of beaten gold and weigh as much as 5 pounds. When not in use the costumes and jewelry are kept in a museum in the palace."

== Folk dance ==
Folk dance forms include dance theater forms like likay, numerous regional dances (ram), the ritual dance ram muay, and homage to the teacher, wai khru. Both ram muay and wai khru take place before all traditional muay Thai matches. The wai is also an annual ceremony performed by Thai classical dance groups to honor their artistic ancestors.

- Ram wong (Thai: รำวง) reflects the characteristics of the dance: a type of partner dance in a circle.
- Ram muay (Thai: รำมวย) is the ritualized dance that takes place before Southeast Asian kickboxing matches such as muay Thai.
- Wai khru (Thai: ไหว้ครู) Wai khru ram muay is a ritualized form of dance meant to pay respect to or homage to the khru, or teacher. It is performed annually by Thai classical dance institutions as well as before muay Thai matches.

== Regional dances ==
=== Central Thailand ===
- Ram si nuan (Thai: รำศรีนวล): A typical dance of central Thailand. Its great popularity is due to the choreography and the sweetness of the music that accompanies it. The lyrics and music evoke the sweet nature of Thai girls. The dance is also an expression of the yearning of a young man won over by such great charm.
- Ram thoet thoeng (Thai: รำเถิดเทิง, 'drum dance'): The teut-teung drum, an instrument used in Thai folk music, is played throughout the country to accompany the parades held at traditional festivals. It is said that the modern style of the teut-teung dance was created by some music teachers.
- Rabam chao na (Thai: ระบำชาวนา, 'farmers' dance'): This is a modern dance created by the Thai Ministry of Culture. The dancers wear the rice growers' traditional costume, and the dance itself enacts the daily activities of these workers who are the backbone of the nation. The ballet opens with the farmers as they come to plough and sow the fields. When they are sure that the rice is growing well, they gather together to pray to Mae Po Sop, the goddess who protects rice-growing. Lastly, the harvest is celebrated with songs and dancing.
- Ram krabi krabong (Thai: รำกระบี่กระบอง): These dances are inspired by types of combat that were typical of Thailand, in which either sticks or swords are used. The skillful use of the short stick depends on the agility of the fighter, who must attack and always remain close to his opponent, while the combatant who takes up the long stick must maintain a critical distance from his rival to use his weapon effectively. The art of sword fighting has been practiced in Thailand since the beginning of time, and, traditionally, a ceremonial dance is performed prior to combat.
Central Thailand dances

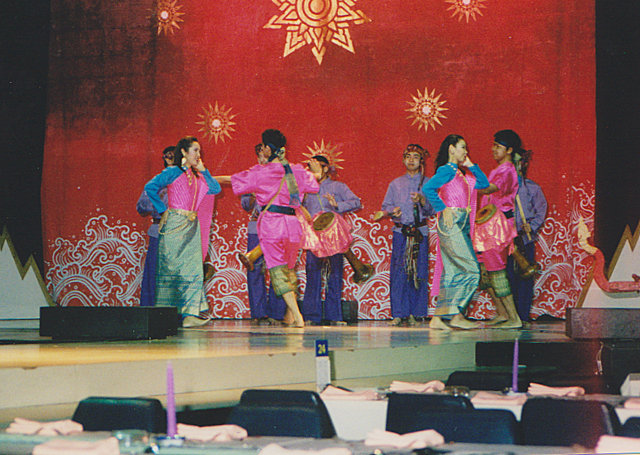
Thoet thoeng dance

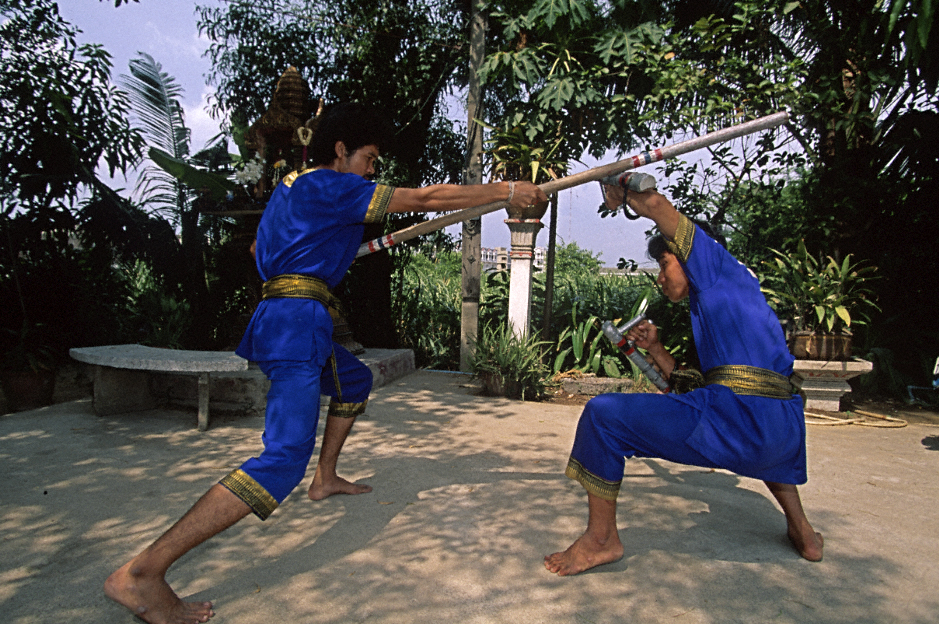
Krabi krabong practitioners

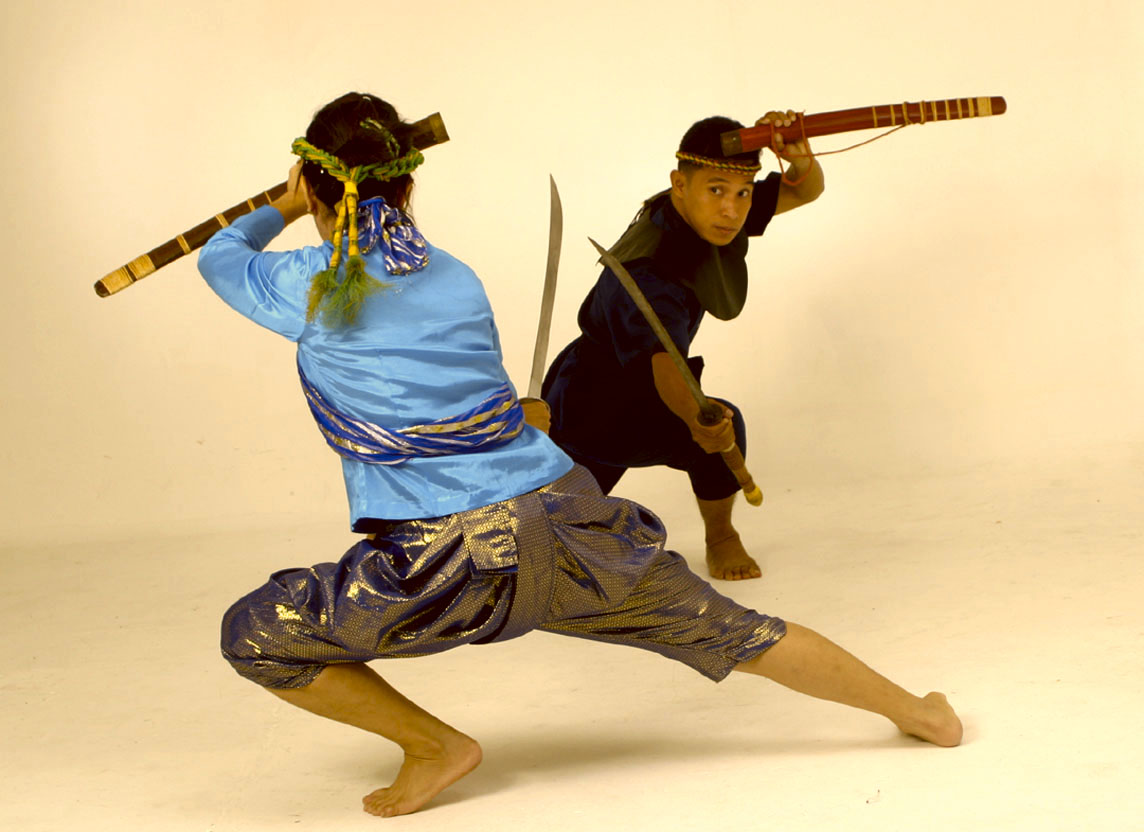
Krabi krabong practitioners with Thai swords (daab)

=== Northeast Thailand ===
- Serng kratip khoa: This dance is performed during traditional celebrations. Usually, the word serng is added to the name of the domestic object used on stage by the dancers. In the case of the serng kratip, the dancers carry typical rice baskets, known as kratip. Their movements imitate those of the women who bring food to the men working in the fields. The choreography is accompanied by music with a lively rhythm. The instruments used are a long drum, charb (cymbals), grab (a kind of castanet), mong (gong), and the kahen (similar to an old-fashioned syringe).
- Serng Isan: This folk dance is generally performed at traditional festivals. The choreography is entrusted to the dancers, who wear brightly colored costumes and express all the joy of the celebration.
- Fon Phu Thai: This dance is part of a propitiatory ceremony performed by the Phu Thai tribe, who live in the northeast. The music that accompanies it is played on typical instruments like the gong ching (a tribal drum), along with other drums and pipes. The gong ching plays a fundamental part because it sets the rhythm for the dance.
- Serng krapo ('coconut dance'): Krapo is the word for 'coconut' in the Isan language. The dance illustrates the activities of a group of nubile girls from the southern part of the region, known as Isan. The dancers hold two coconut shells, with which they execute complex choreographic movements, shaking them, tossing them, or tapping them lightly. This dance is often accompanied by the sound of the pong lang, a kind of upright xylophone made of strips of wood arranged according to the musical scale.
- Isan bantheong ('the happiness of Isan'): This is a series of folk dances usually performed on festive occasions. The swift, harmonious movements are accompanied by folk songs associated with the northeast region.
Northeast Thailand dances

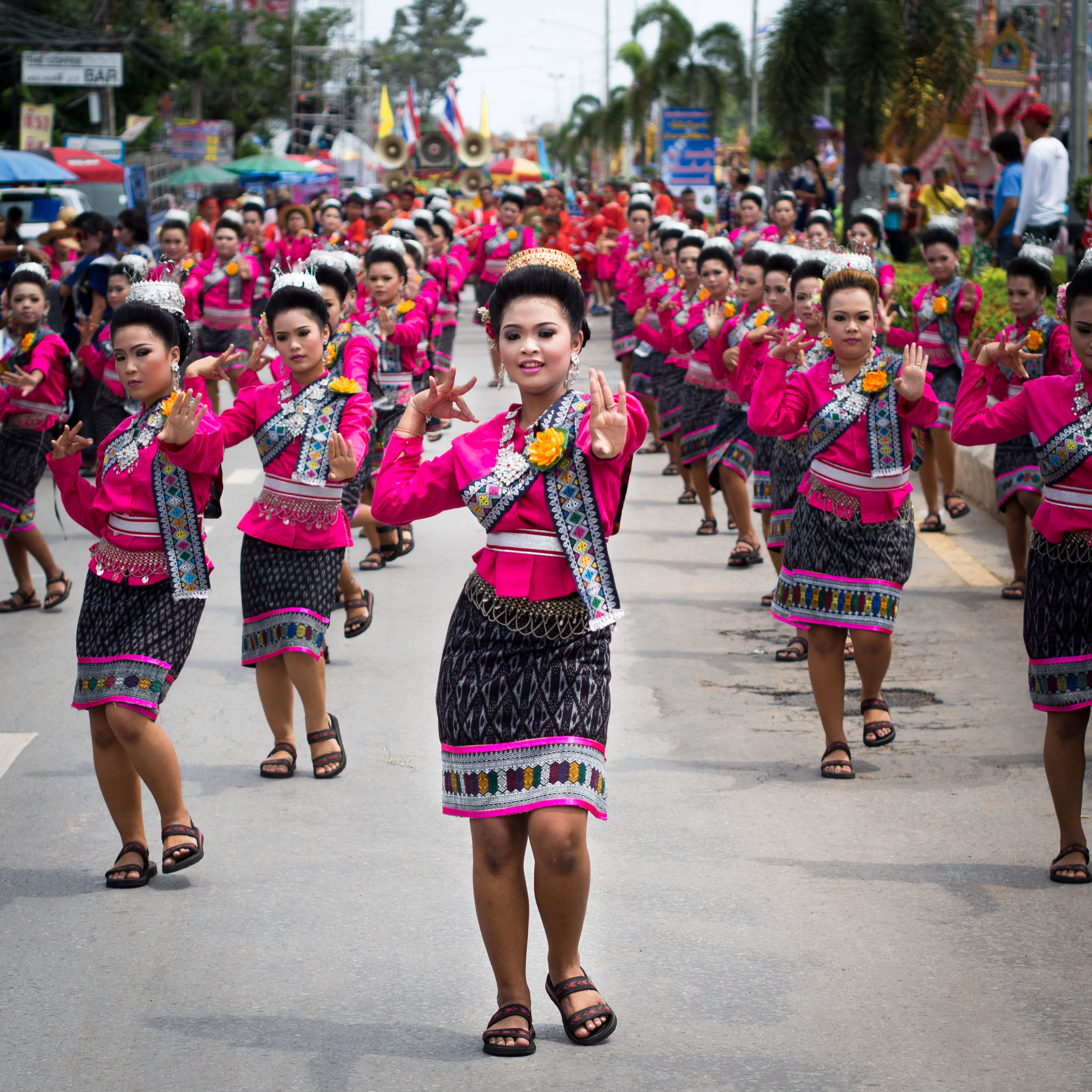
Dancers at a Yasothon festival

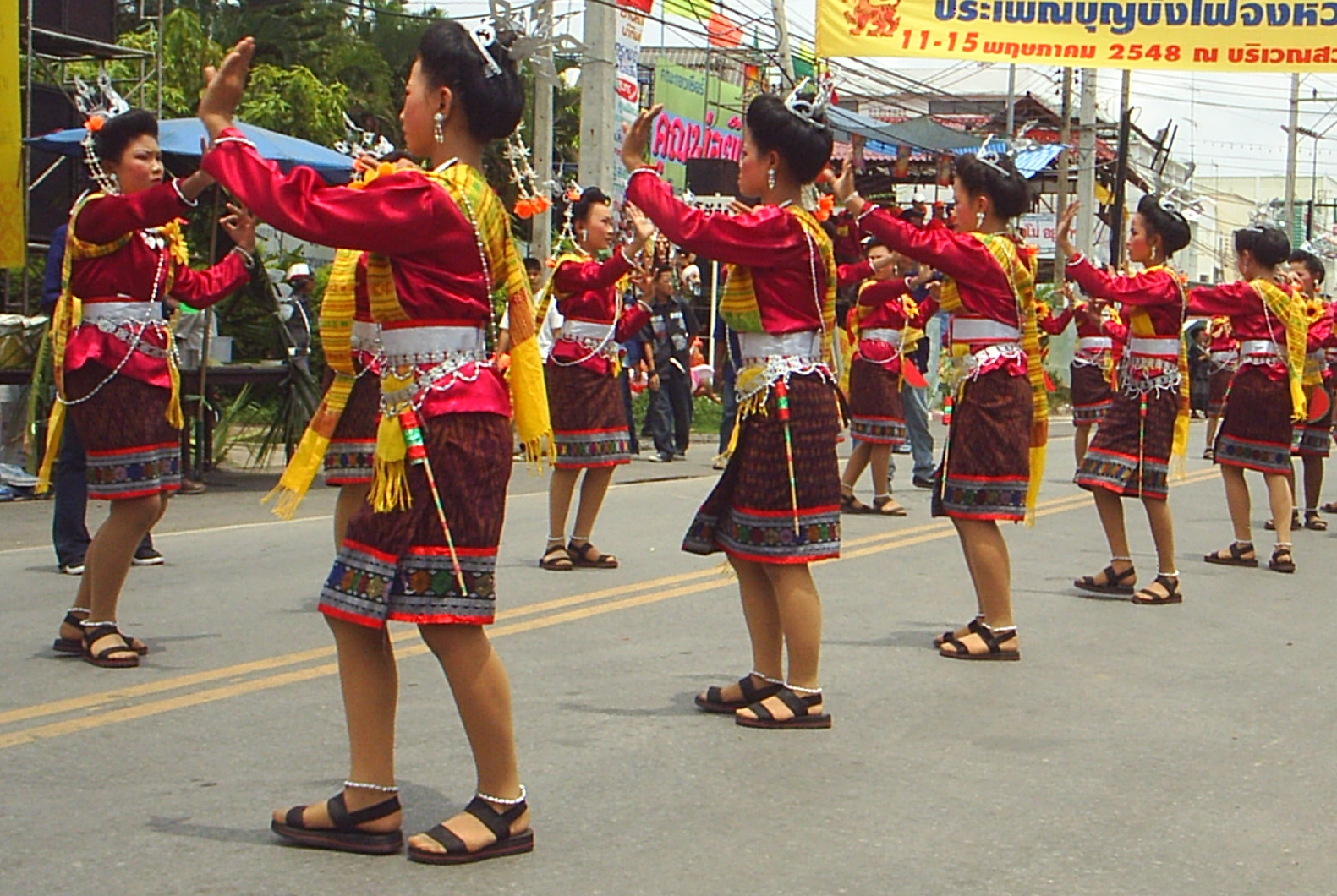
A folk dance in the Rocket Festival parade in Yasothon

=== Northern Thailand ===
- Fon sao mai ('silk weaving dance'): Fon is a type of dance in northern and northeastern Thailand. It is performed in groups and has very slow, graceful, and almost meditative movements. Fon sao mai depicts a traditional profession of northern Thai women in silk weaving. The dance imitates different processes of silk-weaving. For generations, silk production is one of the top home industries in northern and northeastern Thailand and Laos.
- Dance of the Nantha-peri and Pu-cha drums: The nantha-peri is a drum characteristic of northern Thailand, which is used for two purposes: to spur on warriors prior to battle and to pay homage to the Buddha in religious ceremonies. The pu-che, on the other hand, is a type of drum used by the tribes that live in the north: the Tay Yai, the Tai Lue and the Tay Yan. It is used to accompany various dances including, the sword dance, and the kai lai and king ka lai dances.
- Sword Dance: This dance is inspired by an ancient martial art that requires tremendous courage and strength and excellent reflexes. The dancers balance a number of swords on different parts of their bodies while fighting off their rival with a sword sheath.
- Ka-lai dance: Beginners learn to execute graceful and balanced movements through the choreography of this dance.
- King-ka-la dance: The hand movements and steps of the female dancers, who wear spectacular fan-shaped costumes, evoke the movements of a bird.
- The Sounds of the Mountains: The music that accompanies this dance is played on wind instruments characteristic of three tribes in North Thailand: the pi hom (a gourd pipe) of the Tai Lue, the pi joom of the Tay Yuan and the kan nam tao (a gourd flute) of the Li Saw.
- Candle Dance: Typical of the Thai Kheun tribe, this dance is performed in honor of the Buddha. The female dancers pay homage to the divinities that protect the eight cardinal points of the Earth, asking them to pass through the candlelight in homage to the Buddha.
- Khan Dok Dance: The striking choreography of this dance of blessing expresses the calm, serene temperament of the northern peoples.
- Choeng Tua Auk-son Dance: This dance, performed in the Buddha's honor, is characterized by a complex choreography inspired by the calligraphy of the ancient alphabets of the northern regions and by the movements used in martial arts.
- The Sounds of Lanna, the Ancient Kingdom of the North: This music is played on two instruments typical of this region. The phin-phia is a stringed instrument whose body is made from a coconut shell. When he plays it, the musician rests the shell on his bare chest, then moves it or presses it to achieve the desired tonality. In the past, the phin-phia was the instrument used by youths to court the maidens of their village. Few musicians still play it. The sueng is a stringed instrument made of teak or hardwood. It is played by plucking the two metal or brass strings with a horn plectrum.
Northern Thailand dances

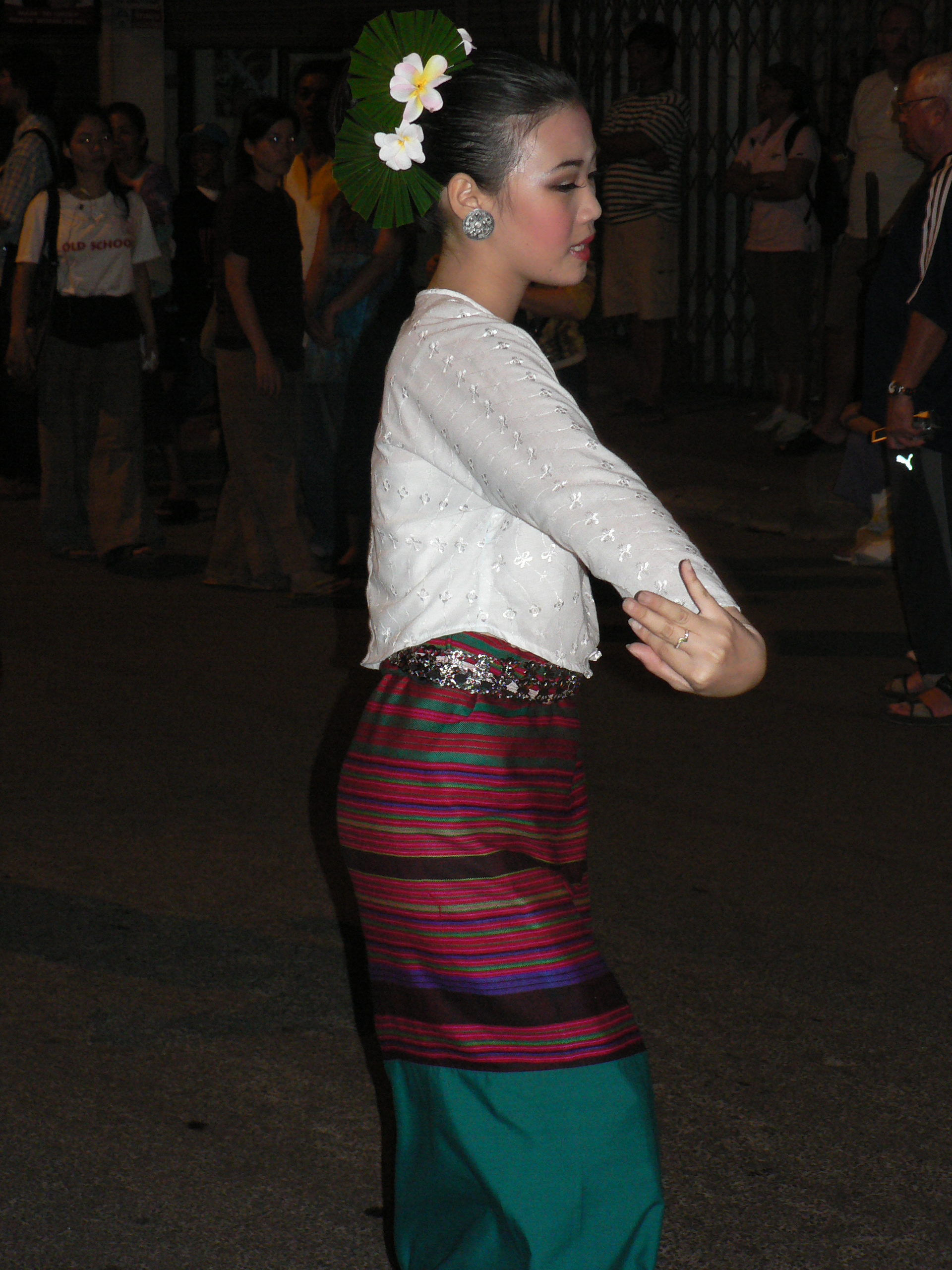
A dancer in Chiang Mai

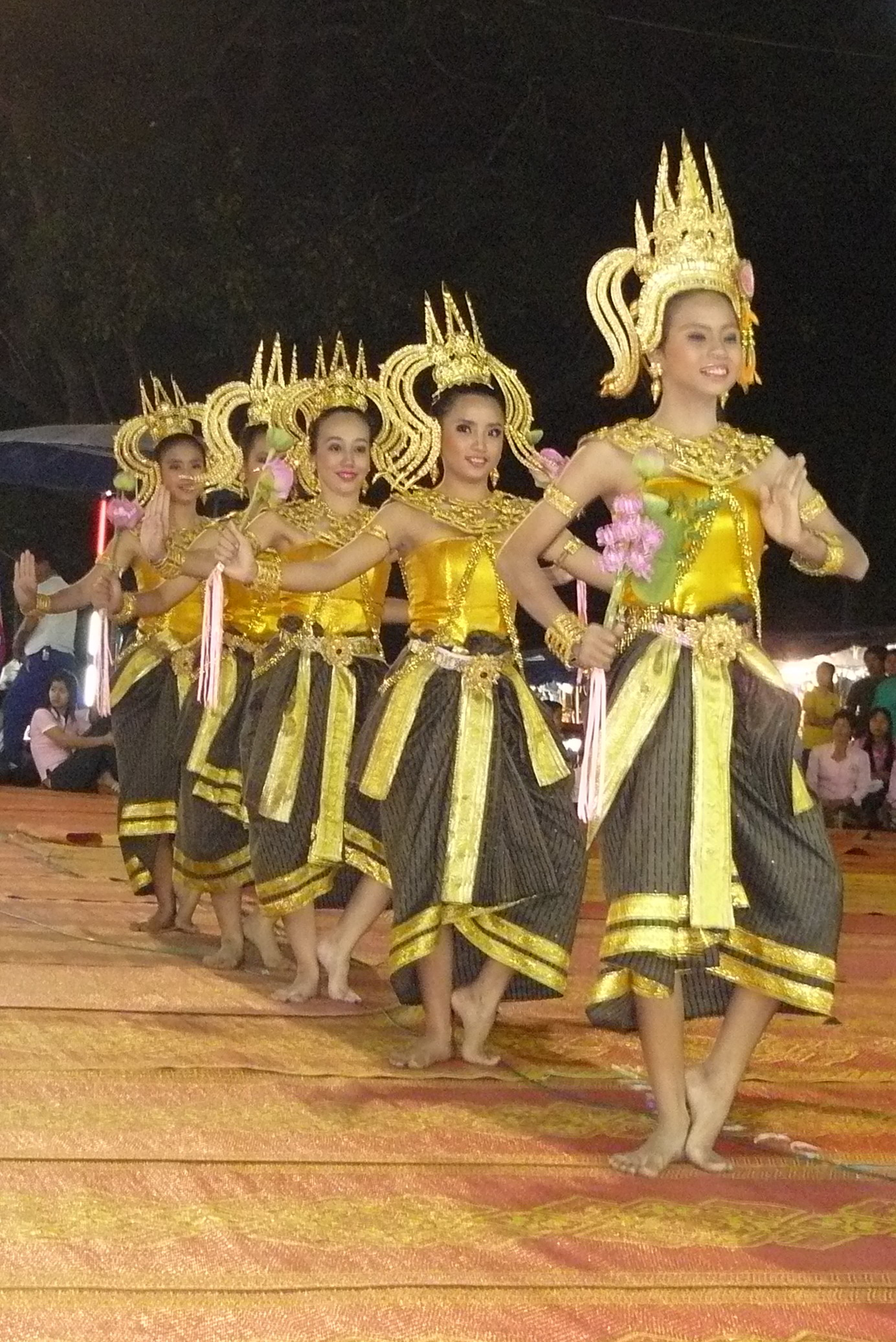
Thai dancers in Laplae wearing Khmer-style dresses and crowns

=== Southern Thailand ===
- Nora: Nora is a traditional dance of southern Thailand (called the Chatri in southern Thai ). Its origins lie in various legends, which there are different versions of. The choreography of Nora varies from region to region, but it is generally composed of 12 positions and 17 movements.
- Nora tua oon: This more refined version of Nora often requires greater interpretive skills and experience. Nora tua oon is often studied from a very young age so that the body can achieve the flexibility necessary to execute the dance's complicated movements. Female Nora tua oon dancers follow a demanding exercise regime and strict discipline.
- Ram taeng kae: Ram taeng kae is an elaborate Nora dance that requires great interpretative skills. In the dance, the protagonist launches a harpoon at a crocodile, whose back, lit by candles, is made from the trunk of a banyan tree. A female dancer moves around the writhing crocodile, poised to pierce its head at the right moment.
- Ram Nora son ram: This dance consists of a basic posture, which is executed by concentrating on hand, arm, and shoulder movements, as well as on the equilibrium and movement of various parts of the body. Ram Nora son ram is accompanied by long lyrics.
- Ram kien pral / yieb louk manao / ram ko soet: This advanced level of Nora is usually performed during competitions between two groups of dancers. To intimidate the rival group, a male dancer strikes an effigy. In the yieb louk manao version, the female protagonist stamps on three lemons, symbolizing the hearts of the rivals. The dance is performed as a sign of victory. Afterward, the female protagonist asks the pran, a comical hunter, to give her a headdress as a symbol of her victory. This is a ceremonial ritual carried out to dishonor rivals and to encourage the members of the group. The dance is characterized by a certain sacredness.
- Ram Nora bot pratom: The choreography of ram Nora bot pratom uses a basic posture in which hand, arm, and shoulder movements are synchronized with head movements.
- Ram ooak pran: In a Nora performance company, the pran, or hunter, plays the part of the fool. He usually wears a hunter's mask or headdress, and the movements are often amusing and designed to make the audience laugh. Each position is in harmony with the dynamic rhythm of the music.
- Ram Nora klong Hong: This advanced level of Nora is performed only on important occasions. The female protagonist plays the role of Hong or kinnaree, a legendary creature who is half woman and half bird. According to a celebrated Nora teacher, ram Nora klong Hong is partly based on the legend of Prasuton-Manora: the seven kinnaree play in the lake in the middle of a wood. Struck by their beauty and lightheartedness, pran Boon, the hunter, chases the maidens in an attempt to catch the youngest. The lively, harmonious movements perfectly evoke pran Boon's pursuit of the kinnaree as the youngest tries to escape.
- Ram Nora tam bot / ram ooak pran: In this dance, the hand movements evoke the beautiful scenery of Songkhla Province in South Thailand. The verses of the song are accompanied by a lively rhythm.
- Rabam Srivichai / rabam Sevichai: This is one of the so-called "Thai archaeological dances". It is a reinvented dance that represents the kingdom of Srivijaya, an 8th to 13th-century Buddhist maritime empire that encompassed present-day Indonesia, Malaysia, and south Thailand. The choreography and dance costumes are based on images carved as a bas-relief on the stupa of Borobudur in central Java and other artifacts of the Srivijaya period. The musical melody is composed in Javanese style, while its colors, black, red, and green, are characteristic of southern Thailand. The dance headdress is called a krabang naa. Some of the movements, poses, and stances are based on classical Javanese and Balinese dance traditions.
Southern Thailand dances

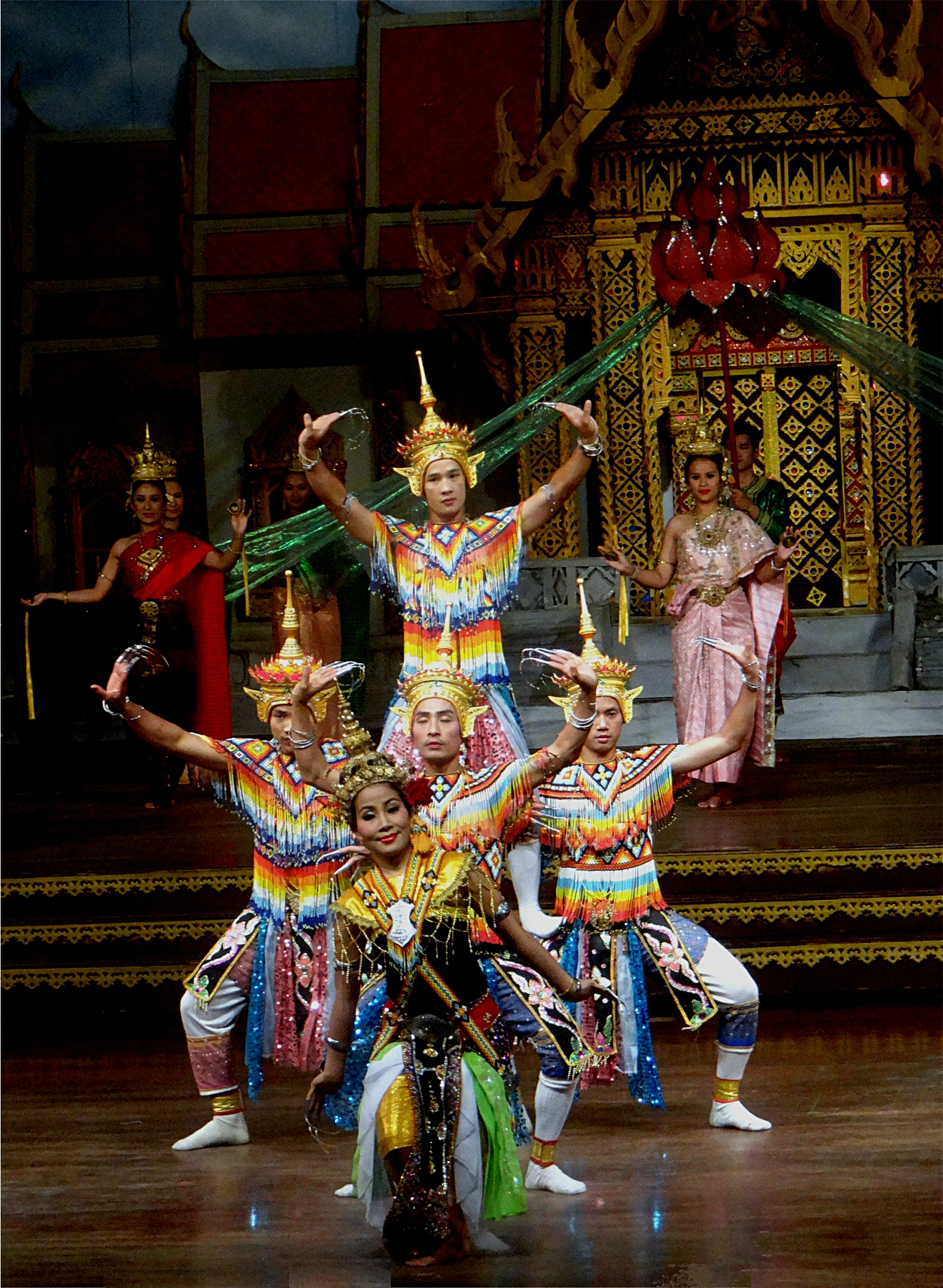
Manora Dance

== See also ==
- Dance of Cambodia
- Dance of Indonesia
- Balinese dance
- Javanese dance
- Sundanese dance
