= Anti-Thai sentiment =

Hatred that is directed towards people in Thailand

Anti-Thai sentiment involves hostility, discrimination or hatred that is directed towards people in Thailand (narrow sense referring to Thai Chinese, usually include Siamese and Thai people of Mon descent), or the state of Thailand.

== Incidents by country ==
=== Cambodia ===
Upon their arrival in Southeast Asia, the Thais were considered as barbarians by the Khmer, who were culturally more refined. The hatred toward Thais in Cambodia has existed since the late Khmer Empire. Siamese forces under the Ayutthaya Kingdom has attacked the Khmer Empire many times and Siam has historically occupied Cambodia. Anti-Thai sentiment began to flare in Cambodia because of Cambodians' fear of Thai designs on western Cambodia. Cambodian animosity towards Thai people is now fueled by a persistent historical negationism found in Thai nationalist discourses, which seeks to draw a distinction between what is referred in Thai as the "Khom people" and the Khmers. The deliberate construction of a new ethnic identity aims to conceal Thailand's extensive adoption of Khmer culture by acknowledging the contributions of the Khoms. Thailand's historical ties to the Khmer Empire, whose influence encompassed language, culture, and governance, are obscured by this narrative. The Khoms, presented as distinct from the Khmers, undermines the reality of Khmer influence on Thai culture.

Charles F. Keyes, a professor of international relations at the University of Washington in Seattle noted in a New York Times article reporting the 2003 anti-Thai riots in Phnom Penh:

But the Thais have also borrowed a lot from Khmer culture. And the Khmers are resentful of the Thai for not acknowledging what they owe to the Khmer heritage.

Violent protests occurred in January 2003 during which the Thai embassy was burned and Thai businesses were vandalised after a Cambodian newspaper article misattributed to a Thai actress, the sayings of her character in a soap opera claiming that Angkor Wat belonged to Thailand and that it should take over the ancient temple. The hatred towards Thai people from the Cambodians would escalate in 2008, when both countries were involved in the border dispute over the ownership of the Khmer temple of Preah Vihear.

=== South Korea ===
Thai tourists are subjected to additional scrutiny from Korean immigration office. Notable incidents, such as a woman being denied entry despite having a return ticket and bookings, have fueled social media discussions in 2023. The growing number of stories shared by deported tourists highlights concerns about perceived discriminatory practices. Diplomatic efforts have been made to address anti-Thai sentiment.

The stringent scrutiny on Thai nationals in Korea has its origins in the longstanding issue of undocumented Thai immigrants, as indicated by both Korea's Ministry of Foreign Affairs and Ministry of Justice. According to data from the justice ministry, approximately 157,000 Thai nationals currently reside in Korea without the requisite permits. Among this demographic, a substantial portion is colloquially termed "phi noi" (Thai: ผีน้อย, lit:little ghost). These individuals, initially arriving in South Korea as tourists, exceed their authorized stay period, predominantly seeking employment in the manufacturing and agricultural sectors.

Thai celebrities working in the South Korean entertainment industry have regularly been subject to racism over their Thai background.

=== China ===
Animosity towards the Thai in China 1934 caused by forced assimilation of the Chinese people in Thailand by Thai authorities. Some of the Chinese who had been deported from Thailand began to spread anti-Thai sentiment in China and called for an immediate boycott from the Chinese authorities to all products that been imported from Thailand.

=== Laos ===
Since ancient times, Laos has been against Siamese territorial expansions. There was a request from Laotians to the French colonial authorities for a recovery of lost territory on the Khorat Plateau and of the Emerald Buddha from Siam. After achieving independence under communism, the present Laos government are much more sympathetic to Vietnam, and there is a rejection from Laotians towards Thailand, which is currently somewhat between a democracy and an autocracy.

=== Myanmar ===
Both nations were involved in several wars in the past. In the present, there is more anti-Burmese sentiment in Thailand than anti-Thai sentiment in Myanmar, as is shown by the publications of Thai school textbooks, films and media reports. The Myanmar government does not regard Thailand as its main enemy but does not consider Thailand as a "trusted friend" either.

== See also ==
- Racism in Thailand
- Anti-Khmer sentiment
- Anti-Vietnamese sentiment
- Anti-Malay sentiment
- Anti-Filipino sentiment
- Anti-Chinese sentiment
- 2003 Phnom Penh riots
