= Lakhon nai =

Thai performing art

Lakhon nai (Thai: ละครใน, pronounced [lā.kʰɔ̄ːn nāj]) is a Thai performing art originating in the royal court of Thailand (formerly Siam). It features slow choreography accompanied by a piphat ensemble. The repertoire of lakhon nai consists of only four epics; the Ramakian, Unarut (Aniruddha), Inao (Panji), and Dalang (a greater version of Inao). A variation of this genre with male performers is called lakhon nai phu chai (Thai: ละครในผู้ชาย; RTGS: lakhon nai phu chai).

== Etymology ==
Lakhon nai is believed to be a contraction of lakhon nang nai (ละครนางใน), or 'theatre of the women of the palace'. It was also known as lakhon khang nai (ละครข้างใน, literally, 'theatre of the inner court') and lakhon nai phra ratchathan (ละครในพระราชฐาน, literally, 'theatre of [belonging to] the king').
