= Anti-Indonesian sentiment =

Negative feelings and hatred towards Indonesia and Indonesians

Anti-Indonesian sentiment or Indonesiaphobia refers to negative feelings, discrimination and hatred towards Indonesia, Indonesians, and Indonesian culture.

== Origins ==
=== Australia ===
==== Human rights problem ====
Amnesty International and the Australian government strongly condemned excessive punishment and executions of Chan and Sukumaran.

==== East Timor problem ====
Despite the Australian government originally supporting Jakarta's policies, the East Timor issue created anti-Indonesian sentiment throughout the Australian community.

==== Papua problem ====
Some Papuans and their supporters opined that Act of Free Choice did not follow New York Agreement. Even though Western New Guinea was previously part of the Dutch East Indies, they considered the governance of the region by Indonesia "illegal" since then. They demand a fresh independence referendum, however, Indonesia oppresses Papuans who demand independence or referendum.

=== Malaysia ===
Due to the infamous Indonesia–Malaysia confrontation of 1963, and the following up of cultural and political controversies, there is an anti-Indonesian sentiment spreading among the Malaysian population. In 1963, shortly after Indonesia invaded British Borneo, Malayans went into a series of anti-Indonesian protests.

During the 2022 FIFA World Cup qualification – AFC second round match between two countries, Indonesian fans' violent reaction after the home team suffered a shock 2–3 loss to rival Malaysia, had led to anti-Indonesian to be stemmed again in the game.

=== Others ===
In June 2024, user Indosarang (Love Indonesia) posted anti-Indonesian and Islamophobic comments on the South Korean diaspora forum website Indosarang, causing national outrage.

== See also ==
- Human rights in Indonesia
- Bali Nine
- Papua conflict
- Indonesia–Malaysia confrontation
