= Anti-Khmer sentiment =

Fear or hatred towards Cambodia or the Khmer people, culture, or language

Anti-Khmer sentiment is a sentiment against Cambodia, the Khmers, overseas Khmer, or Khmer culture. As the Khmers are dominant in Cambodia, it can be attributed to anti-Cambodian sentiment and hatreds against Cambodians.

== Notable anti-Khmer sentiment ==
=== Vietnam ===
During the time of Minh Mạng of the Nguyễn dynasty, Vietnam implied a policy as "Hán di hữu hạn" 漢夷有限 ("the Vietnamese and the barbarians must have clear borders") when differentiating between Khmers and the Vietnamese. Emperor Minh Mạng, the son of Gia Long stated with regards to the Vietnamese forcing the ethnic minorities to follow Sino-Vietnamese customs that "We must hope that their barbarian habits will be subconsciously dissipated, and that they will daily become more infected by Han [Sino-Vietnamese] customs."

=== Thailand ===
The Thai perspective towards the Khmer is a complex blend of admiration and animosity. While there is genuine appreciation for Khmer culture and history, a historical undercurrent of hatred also exists. A long-standing historical misperception prevails among educated Thais and the ruling class, erroneously portraying a so-called Khom ethnic group and the Khmer as distinct peoples. However, this division, rooted in historical misunderstanding, is a unique construct within the Thai narrative, held exclusively by the Thai people. This narrative carries profound consequences, perpetuating historical negationism and masking the genuine historical connection and shared heritage between the two groups. It obscures Thailand’s profound absorption of Khmer culture while simultaneously laying claim to aspects of that culture by acknowledging the contributions of the non-existent Khoms. This historical negationism, which belies the deep-rooted Khmer influence on Thai civilization, has cultivated an anti-Khmer sentiment within Thailand.

In January 2003, riots broke out in Phnom Penh after a Cambodian newspaper falsely reported that a Thai actress had stated Angkor Wat Temple belonged to Thailand. On 29 January, the Thai embassy was burned, and hundreds of Thai immigrants fled the country to avoid the violence. Cambodians in Phnom Penh burned photos of King Bhumibol Adulyadej and Thais in Bangkok protested in front of the Cambodian embassy, burning Cambodian flags. This eventually led to the Thai government severing diplomatic ties with Cambodia. Prime Minister Hun Sen then banned Thai shows and films on TV stations. Throughout 2008–13, Thai and Cambodian military forces engaged in skirmishes against each other over the ownership of the Khmer temple of Preah Vihear, leading to the Cambodian–Thai border dispute. The International Court of Justice's decision in the dispute ruled in favour of Cambodia, which sparked anger among Thai citizens.

=== United States ===
Cambodians in the United States have been subject to racial discrimination. Besides general anti-Asian racism, Cambodians were sometimes seen as being related to the Vietnamese opponent from the Vietnam War.

== See also ==
- Anti-Vietnamese sentiment
- Anti-Thai sentiment
- Anti-Malay sentiment
- Anti-Filipino sentiment
- Anti-Chinese sentiment
