= Anti-Tibetan sentiment =

Discrimination against Tibetan people or culture

Anti-Tibetan sentiment is hostility, discrimination or racism against Tibetans or anything related to Tibetan culture in general. Anti-Tibetan sentiment has been present in various regions of Bhutan, China, India, and Nepal at various points in time. Anti-Tibetan sentiment in South Asia is due to the presence of Tibetan immigrants in those countries. Anti-Tibetan sentiment in China has been fueled by Tibet's historical annexation by China on multiple occasions throughout the centuries. This annexation led to ongoing tensions between Tibetans and Han Chinese, with Tibet currently being under the administration of the People's Republic of China.

== Bhutan ==
The government of Bhutan agreed to take in 4000 Tibetan refugees. Ordinary Bhutanese became increasingly resentful of the Tibetan refugees because of their refusal to assimilate into Bhutanese culture.

== China ==
Ever since its inception, the Chinese Communist Party (CCP), the sole legal ruling political party of the PRC (including Tibet), has been distributing historical documents which portray Tibetan culture as barbaric in order to justify Chinese control of the territory of Tibet. As such, many members of Chinese society have a negative view of Tibet which can be interpreted as racism. The CCP's view is that Tibet was historically a feudal society which practiced serfdom/slavery and that this only changed due to the annexation of Tibet by the People's Republic of China. The Republic of China also claimed Tibet as part of its territory, as did its predecessor, the Qing.

The CCP classifies Tibetan independence activists as one of the Five Poisons.

== India ==
In Arunachal Pradesh, a region bordering Tibet and is claimed by China as being South Tibet, there was a xenophobic campaign and a motion by the state government to expel around 12,000 Tibetans that received much support from the local population, but the Indian government was "angered" by the state government's initiatives.

The Monpas, a people who are ethnically and culturally related to Tibetans, are opposed to Tibetan refugees in their state. Nevertheless all Tibetans are currently peacefully settled.

== Nepal ==
Tibetans and Himalayan ethnic groups of Tibetan origin such as the Sherpa and Tamang are at times derogatorily called "bhotey", which is the Nepali word for someone from Tibet, but is used as a slur.
