= National Offshore One Design =

National Offshore One-Design, or NOOD, is a 9 city sailboat racing circuit held in the U.S. The series is organized by Sailing World Magazine, and takes place in St. Petersburg, Florida, San Diego, California, Annapolis, Maryland, Detroit, Michigan, Chicago, Illinois, Seattle, Washington, Marblehead, Massachusetts, Larchmont, New York, and Houston, Texas.

The organizers define the races in their Notice Of Race (NOR) to include boats of defined minimum size and equipment so at least in name they are capable of off-shore sailing. If a minimum number of one-design boats show an interest in a regatta, the organizer arranges for the class to have a separate starting sequence, or class start.

In recent years the J/105 class sailboats has been the sailboat that often has the most boats in their class for any individual regatta, and has a class start in every NOOD regatta.

In One-Design racing, sailboats compete against other boats in identical boats as defined by their class association, so the first boat over the finish line wins (as opposed to handicap racing, where sailboats of different designs compete against each other, and the winner is determined by calculations involving each boat's individual time, rating and the race course distance).

== See also ==
- Keelboat
