= Anti-Asian racism in France =

Anti-Asian racism in France refers to discrimination that is faced by individuals of Asian descent in France.

== General ==
Anti-Asian racism often consists of beliefs about people of Asian origin, which are often presented in a positive manner but contain hidden undertones of a negative nature: "They are cautious because they integrate without a fuss" versus "They are discreet because they are allies", "They do well" versus" "They act badly".

According to Daniel Tran, of the Chinese Association of France, who was interviewed by France TV Info in January 2018, "There are many clichés circulating on Asian people, clichés specific to men and specific to women. The woman rather "nice, sweet and docile", who must say "yes" to everything. The man, also this cliché of "nice".

There was an assault in August 2016 of a Chinese designer in Aubervilliers, Zhang Chaolin. Three attackers tried to steal his money, but he surrendered to his injuries. Racism caused the attack to be seen as less serious since it was trivialised.

Gregory B. Lee of the Transtextual and Transcultural Studies Institute, speaking at a conference in Valencia at the Armenian Heritage Center in 2013, noted a deep ignorance of Asia and a social imaginary built from a few biased and stereotypical images (confusion between different Asian countries, "dog and cat eaters" and "invaders" about Chinese, etc.).

Mai Lam Nguyen-Conan declared in January 2017 that anti-Asian racism "is finally quite close to anti-Semitism. The idea is spread 'everywhere' while their logic is ultimately that of economic autonomy".

Regarding attacks, "Only a very few complaints have been made to the court, because of a lack of knowledge about French law, the language barrier and a form of fatalism," said Mathilde Pinson. The victims accept the attacks and say that the authorities have better things to do.

== Initial reactions ==
A Representative Council of Asian Associations of France is created in 2011.

After the death of Zhang Chaolin, a 49-year-old Chinese designer assaulted in August 2016 by three men, nearly 2,000 people of Chinese origin gathered in August 2016 in Aubervilliers to protest. Their voices were also heard on social networks.

== Incidents ==
- In June 2013, six Chinese students were assaulted in Hostens, Gironde, and anti-Chinese racist insults were uttered against them.
- On April 21, 2015, the spokesperson of the representative Council of Asian Associations of France alerted the media on "the outbreak of violence to which Asians are the target". He stated that Asians are particularly targeted "because they say they have money on them".
- In 2016, the Chinese community of Aubervilliers is the victim of a large number of attacks. After further attacks, a protest was organized. From November 2015 to August 2016, more than 100 violent attacks were recorded in Aubervilliers.
- On August 13, 2016, Chaolin Zhang died as a result of an assault. On August 21, 2016, a protest was organized by the Chinese community.
- On 29 September 2016, three young people were assaulted and an attacker was released. It was the first time that an attacker was recognised by the Asian community.
- In late May 2019, the Territorial Security Brigade of Vitry-sur-Seine called for a witness to find the victims of a group of young perpetrators of theft with violence who targeted mainly people from Asia.
- In July 2021, French football player Ousmane Dembélé was condemned as a racist, when video footage of him along with teammate Antoine Griezmann circulated online, in which he was seen making racial comments against the Japanese technicians in their hotel room. As the technicians appeared to be troubleshooting the room's television, Dembélé made comments towards Griezmann in French, stating "All these ugly faces, just so you can play PES, aren't you ashamed?", continuing with "What the fuckin language?" before zooming in while laughing on one of the technicians' faces, mentioning "Are you technologically advanced in your country or not?".

== See also ==
- Racism in France
- Human trafficking in France
- Commission nationale consultative des droits de l'homme
- International League against Racism and Anti-Semitism
- Human Rights League (France)
