= Khom =

Historical Thai term for the Khmer people and civilization

Khom (Thai: ขอม, pronounced [kʰɔ̌ːm]) is a Thai- and Lao-language term referring to the people and civilization of the ancient Khmer Empire. Its use is recorded as early as the 12th century, though its exact meaning—whether it refers to a specific empire, a certain historical period, or the Khmer people in general—has been unclear throughout history. From 20th century onwards the term has been commonly leveraged for anti-Khmer sentiment and historical negationism in Thai nationalist discourse.

== Modern use ==
The term has been used extensively in 20th-century Thai historiography, partly as a way to dissociate the historical Angkorian civilization—of which many archaeological sites are spread throughout present-day Thailand—from the present-day Khmer people who form the majority population of Cambodia, whom many Thais still believe to be an inferior race unrelated to the people of the ancient empire. This discourse was popularized by 20th-century Thai nationalist thinker Luang Wichitwathakan who incorrectly claimed that contemporary Khmers are unrelated to the ethnic group responsible for the Angkorian civilization, coining the term "khom" for this purpose. By repurposing the term "khom" derived from the native Khmer term "Khmer Krom" meaning "lowland Khmer", Wichitwathakan attempted to create a new ethnicity to accentuate a distinct separation between Angkor and Cambodia, despite the ethnic continuity between Angkor's builders and present-day Khmer being well-established.

== Etymology ==
In Thai, the term khom has its roots in the Dvaravati Old Mon and Nyah Kur term *krɔɔm meaning "under, below, beneath [prep.]; the under part of (sth.) (especially house) [noun]." The vowel sequence also derived as a variant form: *krɔɔm → *kǝrɔɔm, *kǝnrɔɔm in the Austroasiatic languages then later diversified to other language families as follows:

- Austroasiatic languages
  - Bahnar: krăm ← *krɔɔm
  - Proto-Katuic: *dǝroom ~ *gǝroom "underneath"
  - Khmu: kn(d)ruum ← *krɔɔm
  - Mon: *krom ← *krɔɔm
  - Khmer: krom ← karoṃ, karom (Angkorian) ← karoṃ, karom, karomm (pre-Angkorian) ← *kǝrɔɔm, *kǝnrɔɔm, *krɔɔm (Mon).
- Hmong–Mien languages
  - Hmongic: *gom ← *[kom]kom ← *krom (Mon) ← *krɔɔm.
- Kra–Dai languages
  - Proto-Kra–Dai and Hlai: *kom, kom ← *krom (Mon) ← *krɔɔm.
  - Proto-Tai: gom ← *krom (Mon) ← *krɔɔm.
  - Northern Thai and Lao: khom ← *krom (Mon) ← *krɔɔm. (Note: the term khom, sometimes used to refer to the Khmer period in Siam, not so much for the Khmer of Camboja proper, as for the Mon-Khmer people of Lower Siam—lower Chao Phraya River Basin proper from about 1000 CE to the latter half of the 13th century CE, which was subject to the Angkor empire.)
- Tibeto-Burman languages
  - Burmese: gywans ← kywam, kurwaṁ ← krwaṁ, krwam (Old Burmese) ← *krom (Mon) ← *krɔɔm. (Note: the terms krwaṁ, krwam used to refer to the Cambojan and the term gywans used to refer to the Siam.)

== See also ==
- Khom Thai script, a variant of the Khmer script used in Thailand
