= Anti-Malay sentiment =

Hatred or opposition towards the Malay people

Symbol usually associated with Anti-Malaysian sentiment

Anti-Malay sentiment or Malayophobia refers to feelings of hostility, prejudice, discrimination or disdain towards Malay people, Malay culture, the Malay language or anything perceived as Malay.

It is notable in Singapore, where there is a large Malay community, and in Malaysia, where the Malay people form the majority of the population. Anti-Malay sentiment has also been observed in Thailand, Indonesia and the Philippines.

== Incidents by country ==
=== Indonesia ===
In October 2021, Sri Wahyuni, a financial bureau employee of the Nahdlatul Ulama University of North Sumatra, remarked that "the toilets are dirty because the janitors are Malays" during a complementary study at an elementary school at Lubuk Pakam, Deli Serdang Regency, North Sumatra. Her statement caused protests by the Students' Reform Fighters Front of North Sumatra on 29 October.

=== Malaysia ===
The Malays are one of the major ethnic groups in multiracial Malaysia. In the May 13 Incident on May 13, 1969, a major racial riot broke out between the Malays and Chinese in Kuala Lumpur that suspended the Malaysian parliament for 22 months. UMNO Politician Tunku Abdul Rahman alleged the cause of the riots as parades organised by Chinese Democratic Action Party and Gerakan supporters celebrating anticipated general election victory, chanting provocative anti-Malay slogans such as: "Semua Melayu kasi habis" (Finish off all the Malays), "Kuala Lumpur sekarang Cina punya" (Kuala Lumpur now belongs to the Chinese). Worse still, as the parades passed through Malay communities such as Kampung Baru, the attendees began chanting: "Melayu mati" (death to Malays) and calling the Malays stupid. Some of them carried brooms, allegedly to symbolise the sweeping out of the Malays from Kuala Lumpur, while others chanted inflammatory slogans about the "sinking" of the Alliance boat — the coalition's logo.

Prior to the 1969 general election, a Malay political worker was killed by a Chinese gang in Penang, and a Chinese Labour Party activist was shot and killed in a clash with police in Kuala Lumpur. A funeral procession was held for the shot activist on May 9 but the arrangements were taken over by non-family members, which caused the initially peaceful funeral procession degenerating into unruly mobs just within an hour in which those attendees who were predominantly Chinese chanting and singing incendiary slogans including the Chinese revolutionary song "The East Is Red" while displaying communist icons, as well as provoking Malay bystanders with chants of: "Malai si" (death to the Malays).

Nevertheless regardless of the cause, the May 13 Incident became the worst racial riot in Malaysian history. According to police figures, 196 people died and 149 were wounded. 753 cases of arson were logged and 211 vehicles were destroyed or severely damaged. An estimated 6,000 Kuala Lumpur residents — 90% of them Chinese — were made homeless. Various other casualty figures have been given, with one thesis from a UC Berkeley academic, as well as Time, putting the total dead at ten times the government figure. Since then, the Malaysian government aims to stabilise the economy by introducing the New Economic Policy (NEP) citing income disparity as the main reason for the riots.

=== Singapore ===
Singapore was once a thriving Malay fishing village prior to British colonisation. According to the Malay Annals, a Sumatran prince called Sang Nila Utama was known to have founded ancient Singapore in 1299. However, the modern city of Singapore stemmed from 1819 when established by Sir Stamford Raffles. Under the British administration, Singapore experienced an influx of immigrants particularly from China and India. Singapore joined the Federation of Malaysia on 16 September 1963, along with the present Malaysian states of Sabah and Sarawak. Since Singapore's separation from Malaysia on 9 August 1965, it became a sovereign, multi-racial republic of which the Chinese community formed the majority.

In the 1970s, Mandarin was promoted over other Chinese dialects. SAP Schools were created to provide Mandarin among the Chinese. The reference to Confucian society by former Prime Minister Lee Kuan Yew marked a shift in policy of neutral multiculturalism to Chinese-dominated society. Chinese schools began receiving government aids while other schools were neglected.

The former Prime Minister had once sparked a debate on the loyalty of the Malays to Singapore. He stated that the Malays might have conflict when it comes to loyalty. Earlier, former Indonesian President Habibie's alleged that the Singapore Armed Forces discriminate against the Malays. The Singaporean government has been cautious in issue of Malay loyalty. Prime Minister Lee Hsien Loong is a supporter of this policy. For the same reason, the Malays have been nearly absent from armed force scholarship list and top positions in armed forces.

Also with a number of Muslim youths being radicalized by ISIS and the Muslim community in Singapore consists mostly of Malays, non-Malays have issues trusting them with one incident of an unknown vandalizer drawing a woman in hijab with the word "terrorist" on her at the Marine Parade MRT station construction site.

In January 2019, a 30-year-old man was arrested following a vandalism incident in which hateful slurs against the Malay community were scrawled on poles just outside Aljunied MRT station, Geylang which is near a primary and secondary school. The racial slurs contained words like: "Malay mati" (death to Malays) and other slurs displaying graphic sexual acts and one seemed to refer to Malaysian politician Anwar Ibrahim, although it is not independently verifiable if it actually did refer to Anwar.

There was also an incident where an 8-year-old Malay child who was attending a school bus gets mocked as "Malai zhu" (Chinese for Malay pig) by the school-bus driver.

=== Thailand ===
Southern Thailand and particularly the historical region of Patani is the home of the ethnic Malays in Thailand. In the 18th century after the Thais captured the Malay-dominated provinces in the south, the Thai consciously avoided referring to the people as Malays, instead preferring the term Thai Muslim. For the purpose of integration, Malay identity was discouraged by the Thai state and Malay school children would be fined if they were found speaking in their mother tongue. Due to such policy, there is a diminishing Malay proficiency among young Malays. This had led to prejudice against Muslims in general instead of specifically against the Malays.

At present, there are Malay separatists in southern Thailand demanding that the Malay-Muslim dominated provinces be granted independence. This has led to decades of fatal clashes between Thai security forces and the separatists. Indiscriminate arrest of Malays has fuelled distrust and resentment against the Thai authority among the locals.

Thaksin had declared a militant law in southern Thailand. Former Prime Minister Thaksin has been blamed for action that lead to an incident at Tak Bai that led to the death of a number of Malays.

== See also ==
- 13 May incident – 1969 Sino-Malay sectarian violence in Kuala Lumpur
