= Royal Ballet of Cambodia =

Cambodian classical dance

Royal Ballet of Cambodia របាំព្រះរាជទ្រព្យ
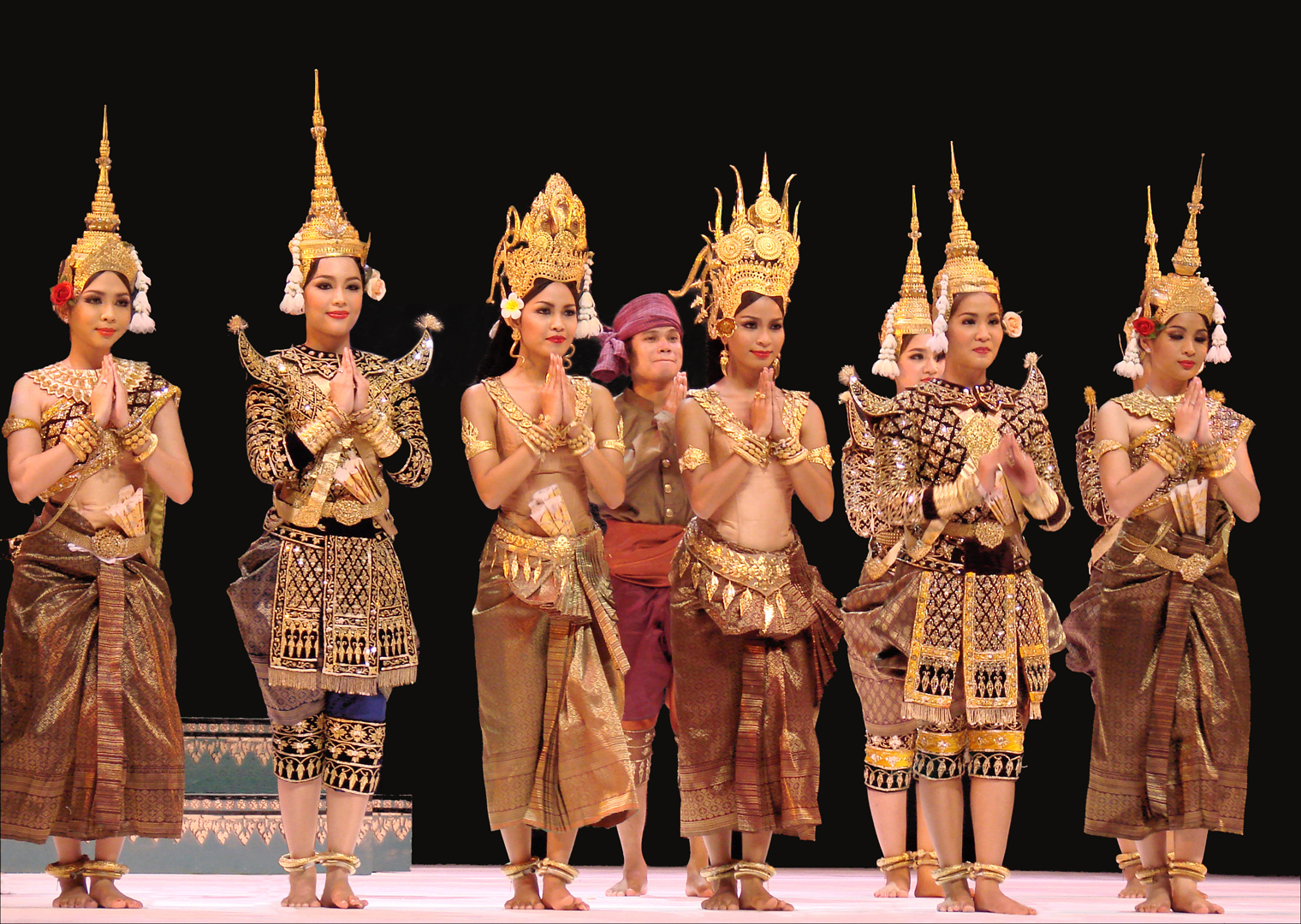
- Cambodia Royal Ballet
- Medium: Dance
- Originating culture: Khmer

Royal Ballet of Cambodia
- UNESCO Intangible Cultural Heritage
- Country: Cambodia
- Reference: 00060
- Region: Asia and the Pacific

Inscription history
- Inscription: 2008 (3rd session)
- List: Representative

The Royal Ballet of Cambodia (Khmer: របាំព្រះរាជទ្រព្យ, Robam Preah Reach Troap, lit. 'Dance of Royal Wealth') is a classical Khmer dance known for its intricate hand movements and elaborate costumes. Historically linked to the Khmer court, it has been performed at various royal ceremonies such as coronations, weddings, funerals, and Khmer holidays. The repertoire includes various ancient Khmer legends.

The ballet faced near extinction during the Khmer Rouge regime in the 1970s but continues to be a significant element of Cambodian cultural heritage. It has been inscribed on the UNESCO Intangible Cultural Heritage Lists since 2003.

== Etymology ==
Western names for this dance tradition, such as Cambodian court dance, often make reference to the royal court, as the tradition was performed and maintained by attendants of the royal palaces. As a performing art, it is formally referred to as the Royal Ballet of Cambodia (le Ballet royal du Cambodge in French) by UNESCO, Cravath, Brandon, and others in the academic field, although this term may also refer to the National Dance Company of Cambodia. The term Khmer classical dance is also used alongside "Royal Ballet of Cambodia" in publications by UNESCO and the above-mentioned authors.

In Khmer, it is formally known as Robam Preah Reach Trop (របាំព្រះរាជទ្រព្យ), lit. "dances of royal wealth") or Lakhon Preah Reach Trop (ល្ខោនព្រះរាជទ្រព្យ), lit. "theatre of royal wealth"). It is also referred to as Lakhon Luong (ល្ខោនហ្លួង, lit. "the king's theatre"). During the Lon Nol regime of Cambodia, the dance tradition was referred to as Lakhon Kbach Boran Khmer (ល្ខោនក្បាច់បូរាណខ្មែរ), lit. "Khmer theatre of the ancient style"), a term alienating it from its royal legacy.

Khmer classical dancers, as a whole, are frequently referred to as apsara dancers by laymen; this usage would be incorrect with the modern form of the dance, as the apsara is just one type of character among others in the repertoire. Regardless, the tradition's romanticized affiliation with the apsaras and devatas of the ruins of Angkor still persists.

== History ==
=== Angkor and pre-Angkor era ===
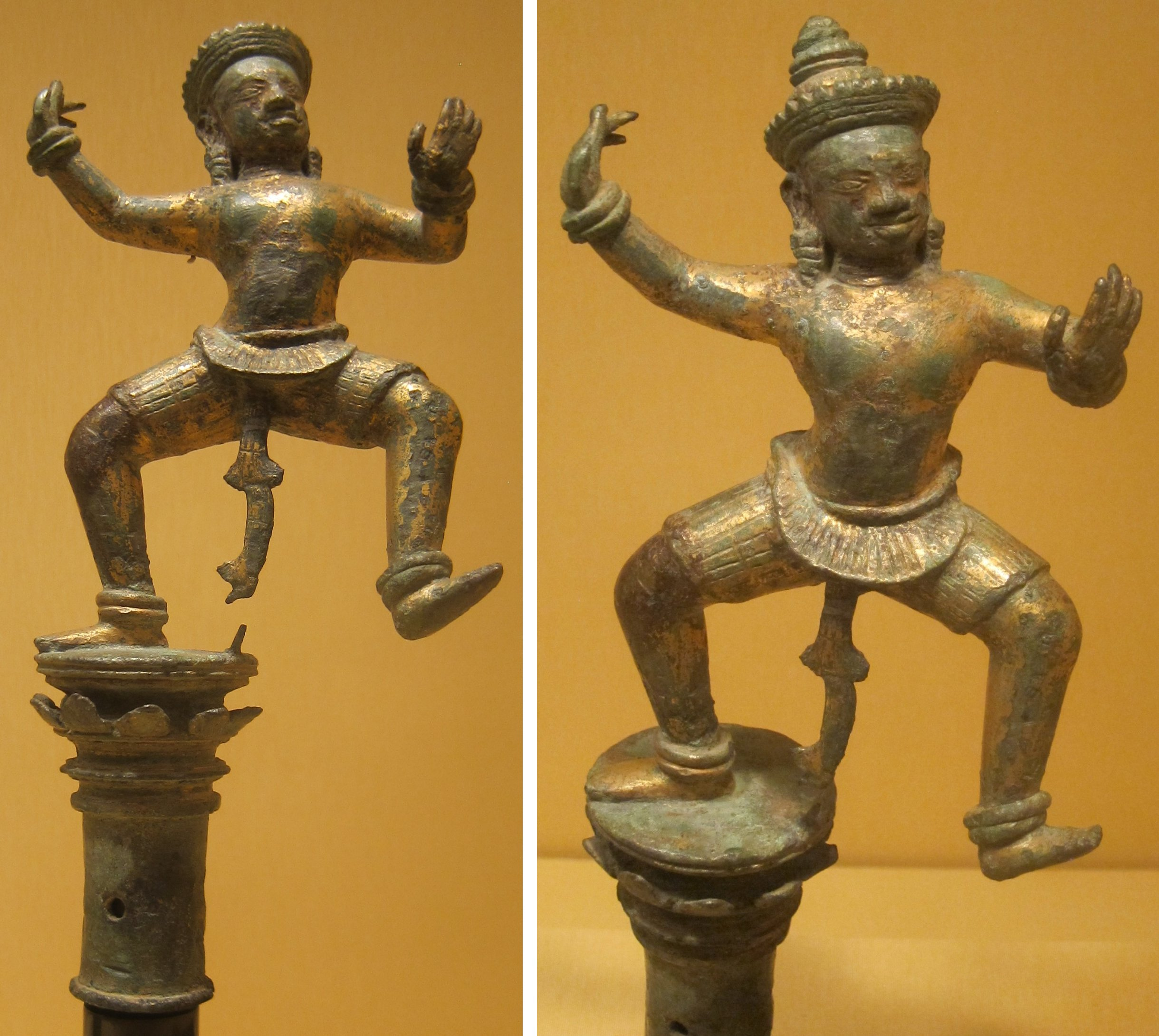
Dancer on finial, gilt bronze, 900s AD.

One of the earliest records of dance in Cambodia is from the 7th century, where performances were used as a funeral rite for kings. Ancient stone inscriptions describe thousands of apsara dancers assigned to temples and performing divine rites as well as for the public.

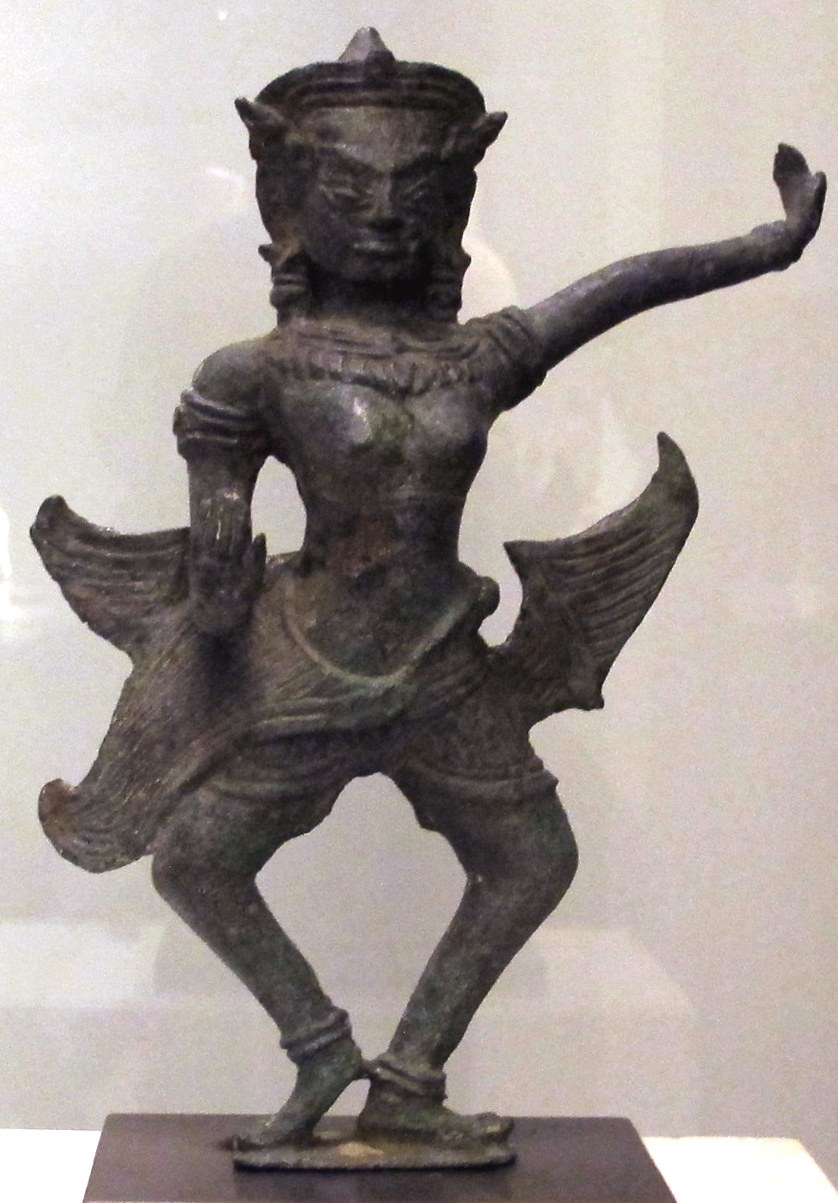
Khmer dancer, 1100s/1200s AD.

Of the five pre-Angkor inscriptions mentioning dancers is the oldest known Khmer inscription (K.600). Dated 611, it's found on a temple where a god named with the suffix -isvara (Shiva) had merged with another with a name that denotes a tree. Offerings to the temple of one Antar include seven female dancers (jmah ge ram), six of whom are named. Save for two, all names (musicians and dancers) are in Sanskrit. George Cœdès dated inscription K.51 to the late sixth-early seventh century, though stylistically there's a likeness with fifth century Funan inscriptions. An itemization of gifts from one Indradatta to a temple's deity bear four legible names of female dancers (called rapam): Ata, Tittaru, Ngarngor, and Kandin. The inscription K. 138 indicates that four dancers(ram), two female and two male, were offered to a Shiva temple on a waning moon's first day. Inscription K. 155, dated to the late seventh or early eighth century, details one Chief of Granaries offerings of 12 named female dancers (rpam). Evidence for a literary basis for dance during Funana/Chenla era are found in a sixth century inscription near Laos by Veal Kantel, a Cambodian village. King Bhavavarman's brother-in-law offered copies of the Ramayana and Mahabharata to a temple dedicated to Shiva.

Depiction of dancer from Angkor Wat bas-relief by George Groslier.

During the Angkor period, dance was ritually performed at temples. The temple performers came to be considered as apsaras, who served as entertainers and messengers to divinities. A Yasovarman I-era (889–910 CE) inscription says the king offered several "beautiful [women] dancers" as well as several "handsome, mature men skillful in dance and the other arts, well dressed and adorned with ornament.” An inscriptions dated 982 explains how those that waste their riches and pillage fields and "golden ornaments and precious stones and all that the founder has given to the farmers, to the dancers and the musicians" ultimately face retribution. On King Yasovarmann I, another inscription from the 900s says women of the "Masters of the Earth danced in his presence taking from him the rhythm which he gave them by clapping his hands" and that his glory "danced without having learned, to the sound of the songs" that came from the "wives of warriors vanquished by him.” A column uncovered at Phimeanakas features a late-12th century tribute to Queen Jayarajadevi in a poem by her younger sister, Queen Indradevi, saying in part that having upheld her (Jayarajadevi's) pledge and reached the “Buddhist fruit,” she directed her "own dancers to perform" and "give performances" from the Jataka.

Thai scholar Mattani Mojdara Rutnin states Khmer dancers presumably performed ceremonial dances to Shiva at the temple of Vimayapura, located in modern-day Thailand, and known now by the Thai name Phimai. Mattani suggests these performances may have been the origin of the Thai Phra Phirap ritual dance, which honours the spirits of dance in the Phithi Wai Kru ceremony. Scholar and author Paul Cravath learned from Thai dance authorities that Churning of the Ocean of Milk entered Siam, where the ceremony is called Chak nak Dukdamban, via Khmer performers. Cravath states the Hindu myth as carved on Angkor Wat depicts an actual performance of Khol, the masked, all-male Khmer dance drama. The people of Sukhothai most likely absorbed Khmer art, such as dance, as the Khmer terms for dance, ram and robam/ropam, emerged as Thai loanwords during this period.

=== Post-Angkorian era ===
The tradition of temple dancers declined when the Angkor era came to an end. Scholar Xenia Zarina wrote that dance came to Thailand through the Khmer Empire when the Siamese ransacked Angkor, saying "among the 90,000 prisoners of war were artists and artisans" including dancers, which the Thai "especially loved and cultivated." Thai former Director General of the Fine Arts Department Dhanit Yupho says the Khmers may have introduced masked dance-drama to Siam as the Thai word Khon, first appearing in Ayutthaya after Khmer artists were brought to the court, comes from the Khmer word Khol. Scholar Paul Cravath wrote that the evidence shows that some Angkorian dancers followed the Khmer king to the new capital.

Portuguese historian Diogo do Couto described a lake with several boats "gathering the rice with merry energy, dances and musical contests” at Angkor in the late 1580s. Monsieur de la Loubere gave a 1688 account of "the rabam" (from the Khmer word robam for dance) in Siamese court dance at Ayutthaya and noted it was performed at funerals, implying Siam retained the ritualistic nature of Khmer robam at least during that period, though later losing its Khmer "ritual function" in favor of the Siamese/Thai dramatic dance.

King Ang Duong spent two decades exiled in Siam, where the Siamese King later held the three eldest of Duong's sons captive, and ruled Cambodia as a vassal of Siam. According to one account, the court of Bangkok provided dancers to Ang Duong's court due to declining numbers of ballet dancers in Cambodia, though this claim has been contested. Ballet teacher and scholar Prumsodun Ok argues the perception of low numbers can be explained by the practice of dancers leaving the court upon the death of a sovereign. Duong pursued the "old teachers" to rid the dances of "unsuitable" elements which could include influence of the Vietnamese, who'd installed Duong's predecessor and niece, the unpopular Queen Ang Mey.

The king, who studied the conservative Dhammayuttika branch of Buddhism in Bangkok, implemented modest costumes of heavy fabrics for form-fitting tops and a restrictive sampot, as opposed to the loose sampot worn by dancers until his changes, which mirror his interest in the Chbab Srey ("woman's law") poem he likely authored. In the 1850s, French missionary Charles-Émile Bouillevaux described in Ang Duong's palace a "great deal of music and theatre; I have caught a glimpse sometimes, much in spite of myself, of his concubines who simulate battles between the ancient heroes of India.” A girl named Nuon was presented to Duong's court to learn ballet and eventually became the "star ballerina." She became a "consort" of the king and rose to second rank as Khun Cham Soda Duong ("Eminent Munificient Sweet Lady"). Lakhon Khol plays were codified during Ang Duong's reign based on the Reamker depicted in 12th century bas-reliefs in Angkor Wat.

During the reigns of Ang Duong, Norodom, and Sisowath, dances were based on the Reamker, Khmer melodramas, and folk legends. In a process of cultural exchange, the Javanese work, Inao, may have entered Cambodia via Siam.

=== French colonial era ===
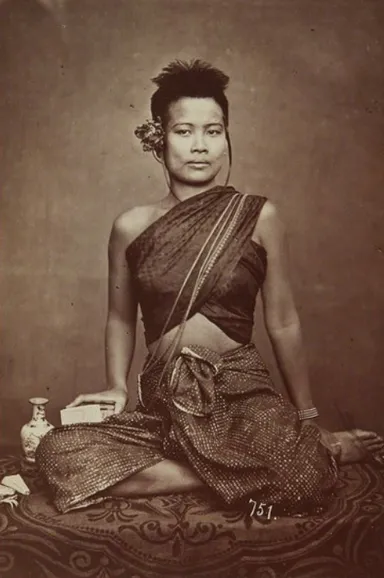
Neang Sok, dancer photographed by Émile Gsell, circa 1860.

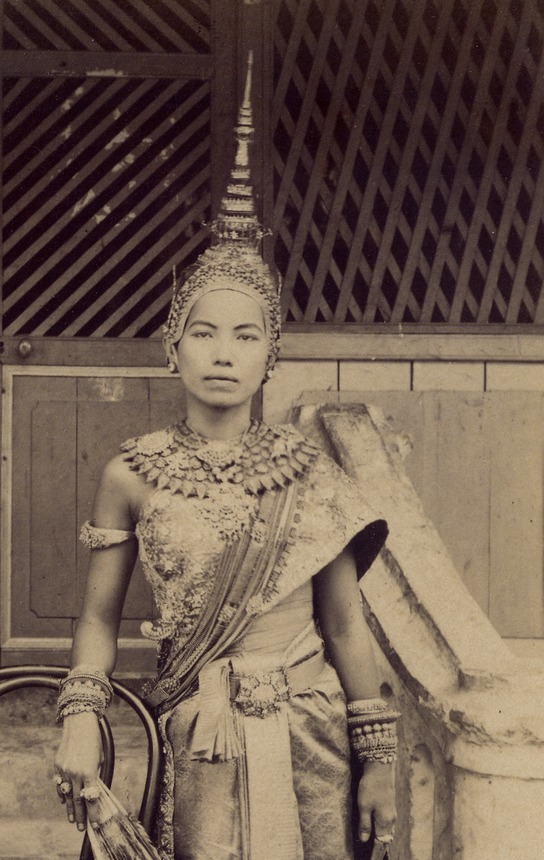
Nuon, or Moneang Socheat Bopha (Khun Than), 1870.

Cambodia became a French protectorate in 1863. Since then, dancers began performing for foreign dignitaries and for the public on the monarch's birthday. Dance was thereby, promoted as national identity.

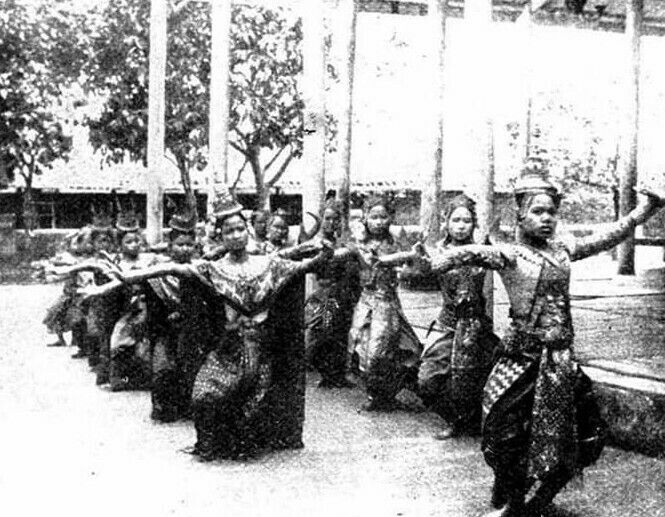
Rehearsal of a Khmer dance troupe in Battambang, 1885.

Dance rehearsal, likely troupe of Lord Governor Lok Muccha, in Battambang, circa 1885.

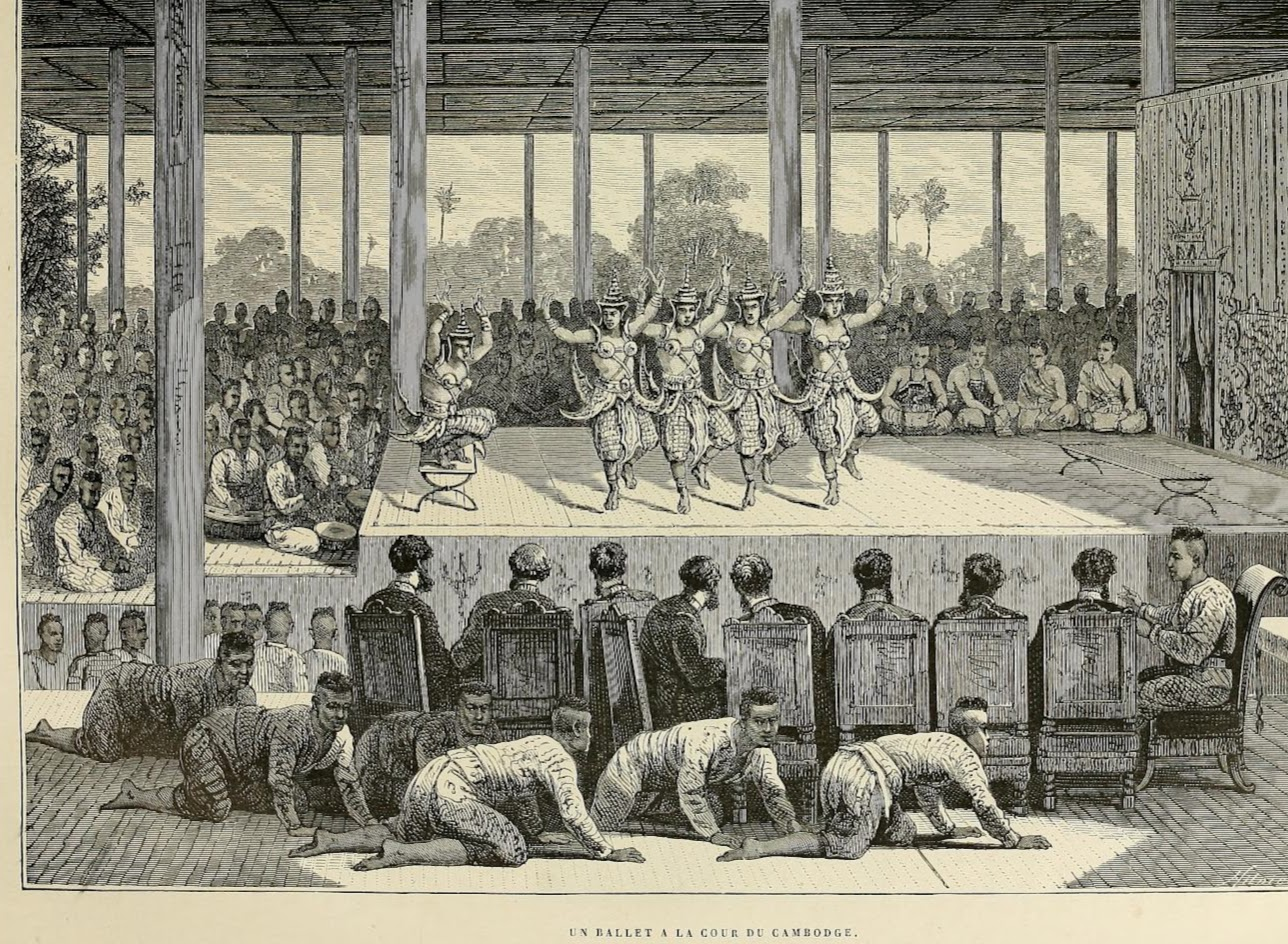
"In ballet at the court of Cambodia." Louis Delaporte, Phnom Penh, July 1866.

King Norodom was crowned in 1864. The number of Norodom's palace dancers is unknown because foreign nationals were barred from accessing the private compound. Some suggestions ranged from 400 to 800. French representative Jean Moura estimated 2,000 palace "servants, including dancers," while French curator and author George Groslier's figure was 500 dancers split into three troupes, including male dancers.

Norodom's wives and other royal women were responsible for the dancers. Predossesor King Duong's star dancer, Nuon, became Norodom's first wife, and called Khun Than. Later bestowed Preah Moneang Socheat Bopha, she's believed to have managed up to 300 artists. Nuon held significant power, and even stood up to the colonial authorities so that her "protégés" remained out of French hands. The colonial French viewed the women of Norodom's court as such an influence on the king that one French chief of staff complained hyperbolically in part,"These women had placed the sovereign in a cage."

French photographer Emile Gsell took 26 photos of Indochina in the 1860s, with 21 of Cambodia. One photo set depicts Neang Sok, a "tall" royal Khmer ballerina known for portraying males (neay rong). She married Frenchman Paul Le Faucheur who worked on the Royal Palace, and had a daughter named Mliss. During Prince Chandaleka’s 1901 Sakant Chuk, a Khmer hair-cutting ceremony, French architect Henri Dufour photographed the palace women led by Nou Nam, Norodom’s 17 year old first ballerina. Dufour noted she wears a “magnificent radiating diadem, the kbang-na.”

After a dance hall (or rong ram រោងរាំ) was erected at the palace in 1866, French explorer Louis Delaporte was among those invited by Norodom to witness a royal dance performance Delaporte's sketch of the performance in the dance hall was the first "pictorialization of Khmer dancers" ever documented by a European.

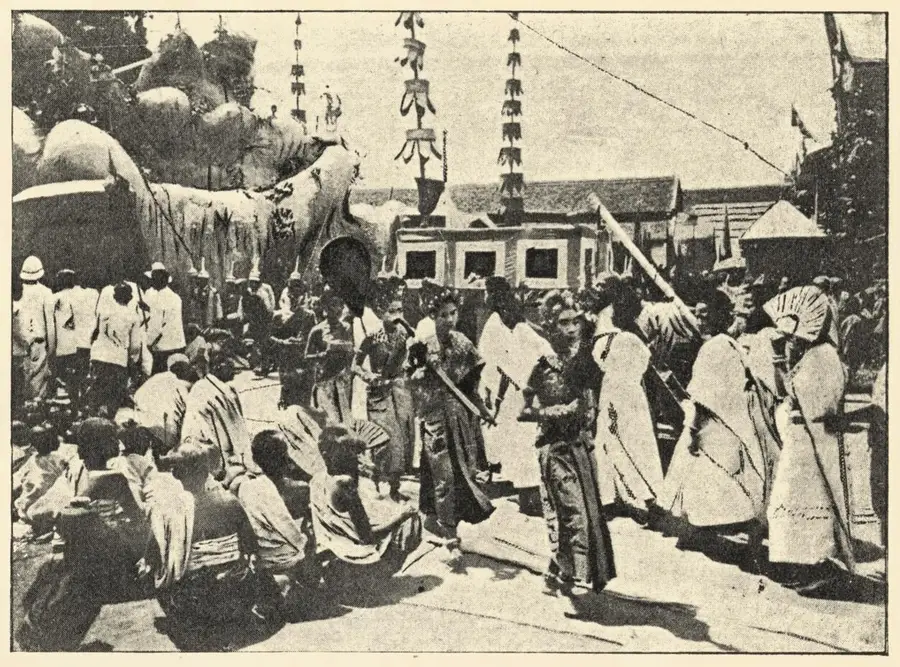
17 year-old lead dancer Nou Nam leading palace ladies, 1901.

Khmer dancers in Phnom Penh, circa 1903.

There were many troupes and dancers in Cambodia during this time. Two teen girls with a talent for climbing trees were sent to join the Battambang governor’s dance troupe. French diplomat Auguste Pavie's writings mention traveling dance troupes, and that some children's troupes were made up of both boys and girls, in the 1880s. His photographs of a dance rehearsal in Battambang are the oldest known photos of Khmer ballet performances. Pavie reported that costumes "recalled those in the ancient bas-reliefs," though they varied in quality. An 1888 report by Edgar Boulangier stated that the Battambang dancers of M. Catalone was "considered superior to that of Norodom" and the "choreographic traditions" Cambodia's "most faithfully preserved."

Considered "accessible to outside influence," King Norodom welcomed dancers and musicians from Burma (Myanmar), China, Laos, Malaysia, Siam (Thailand), and Vietnam. He brought musicians back from the Philippines and "Malayan coachmen" from Singapore in 1872; a Malay's daughter became a lead dancer and teacher.

Marseille Colonial Exposition, 1906

Cambodian ballerinas as a couple, Marseille Colonial Exposition, 1906.

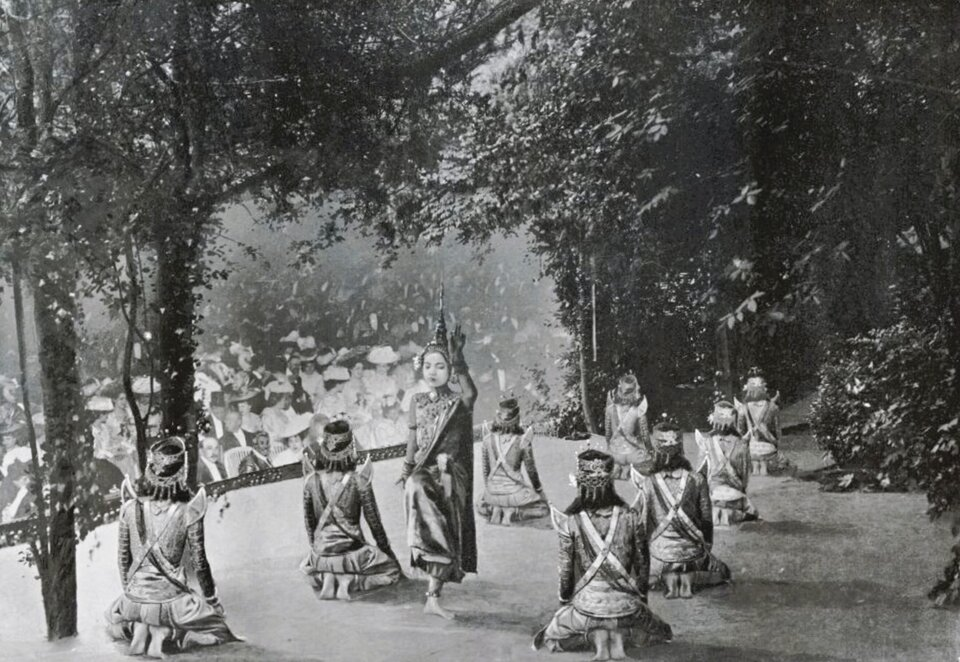
Cambodian dancers at Marseille Colonial Exposition, 1906.

Auguste Rodin sketching Cambodian dancers in France, 1906.

Cambodian dancers in costume, 1908.

King Sisowath ascended in 1904, the year his brother Norodom died. About 70% of the palace dancers departed, some of whom formed private troupes. Many more were imprisoned for accrued debts. Some 100 dancers, also the youngest, remained in the palace. Palace Minister Samdach Chaufea Thiounn (aka Okhna Veang), son-in-law of Khmer ballerina Neang Sok and Frenchman Paul Le Faucheur, guided all "performance activity."

Frenchman George Bois sought Khmer dancers for the 1906 Marseille Colonial Exposition. In addition to Portuguese-Khmer Colonel de Monteiro's dance troupe of 20, incarcerated dancers were offered by prison director Rath if Bois agreed Rath may also come along. Sisowath also permitted the Royal Ballet to perform at the exposition on the condition he accompanies them. The king brought an entourage, and the dancers themselves under the direction of his daughter, Princess Soumphady. 5,000 tickets sold for just 1,200 seats, resulting in a riot. Calm returned once Princess Soumphady “resentfully” agreed to a midnight performance. Auguste Rodin created 150+ paintings of the dancers, and said in part, "There have been only these dancers and the Greeks." Rodin followed the troupe back to Phnom Penh, and interpreted the performance as ballet.

Khmer ballerina Ratt Pos (also Malee ម្លិះ) under full moon, George Groslier, 1911.

Born in 1887, George Groslier was the first French person born in Cambodia, before his family departed for France with him around 1889. Groslier returned to Cambodia in 1910, and two years later wrote in his book Danseuses Cambodgiennes: Anciennes et Modernes (Cambodian Dancers: Ancient and Modern) that Cambodian dance was on the verge of extinction due "decreasing interest" and consumption of "material things." Modern researchers have evaluated and rejected Groslier's "fatalistic" claims that Khmer dance (and culture) was a dying tradition, viewing it as colonial rhetoric for justifying French intervention and control. Scholar Paul Cravath wrote that while fewer in number, the palace troupe "carried on their function pretty much as always." Cravath and historian Suppya Hélène Nut wrote that Groslier’s “unduly bleak” 1912 assessment of Khmer dance is contradicted by his own building of the Chan Chaya Pavilion dance hall the next year, and Nut also notes the successful 1906 performance in France.

Cravath wrote that Groslier's text was composed based on “very little direct contact” with the court dancers and no effort from Sisowath to give "a more rounded picture" of the dancers' state. He said further that Groslier failed to recognize the dancers' continuing ritual roles, and that the "grim picture" Groslier painted created "the foundation for the eventual French takeover" of the court dance.

Marseille Colonial Exposition, 1922

In front of the Angkor Wat replica in Marseille, 1922.

Cambodian dancers in Marseille, France, 1922.

In front of Angkor replica, Ith front and center, France, 1922.

Nut and Cravath both wrote that the decreased number of dancers under Sisowath stemmed from French budget decisions and shifts in royal funding. Bois had also revealed that upon the crowning of Sisowath, several dancers were dismissed due to the French-imposed pay decrease for the king.

Khmer dancers performing at Angkor Wat, 1921.

Early on, Sisowath paid the dancers and covered costumes/accessories with under 10% of his budget, despite french-imposed "financial restraint." In 1911, youngsters among the troupe were encouraged to go to school by King Sisowath, dancers could exit court at will. According to Paul Cravath, Khmer dance's ritual basis remained but French influence and money constraints diminished "the individual dancer's position in the court."

The Cambodian Royal Ballet again performed in Marseille, France, for the 1922 Colonial Exhibition. A comparatively “small group” of dancers and musicians to those in 1906 attended the exhibition, and 85 year old King Sisowath didn't accompany the troupe this time. The dancers continued to Paris, though the tour was tame compared to 1906. Cravath wrote that French excitement for “the exotica” had waned since 1906 and one reporter mentioned the mocking laughter of "uncivilized" people in Paris. although colonial administrator Pierre Guesde wrote how the dancers “were applauded several times.” Out of the touring Khmer dancers, the star ballerina was Ith.

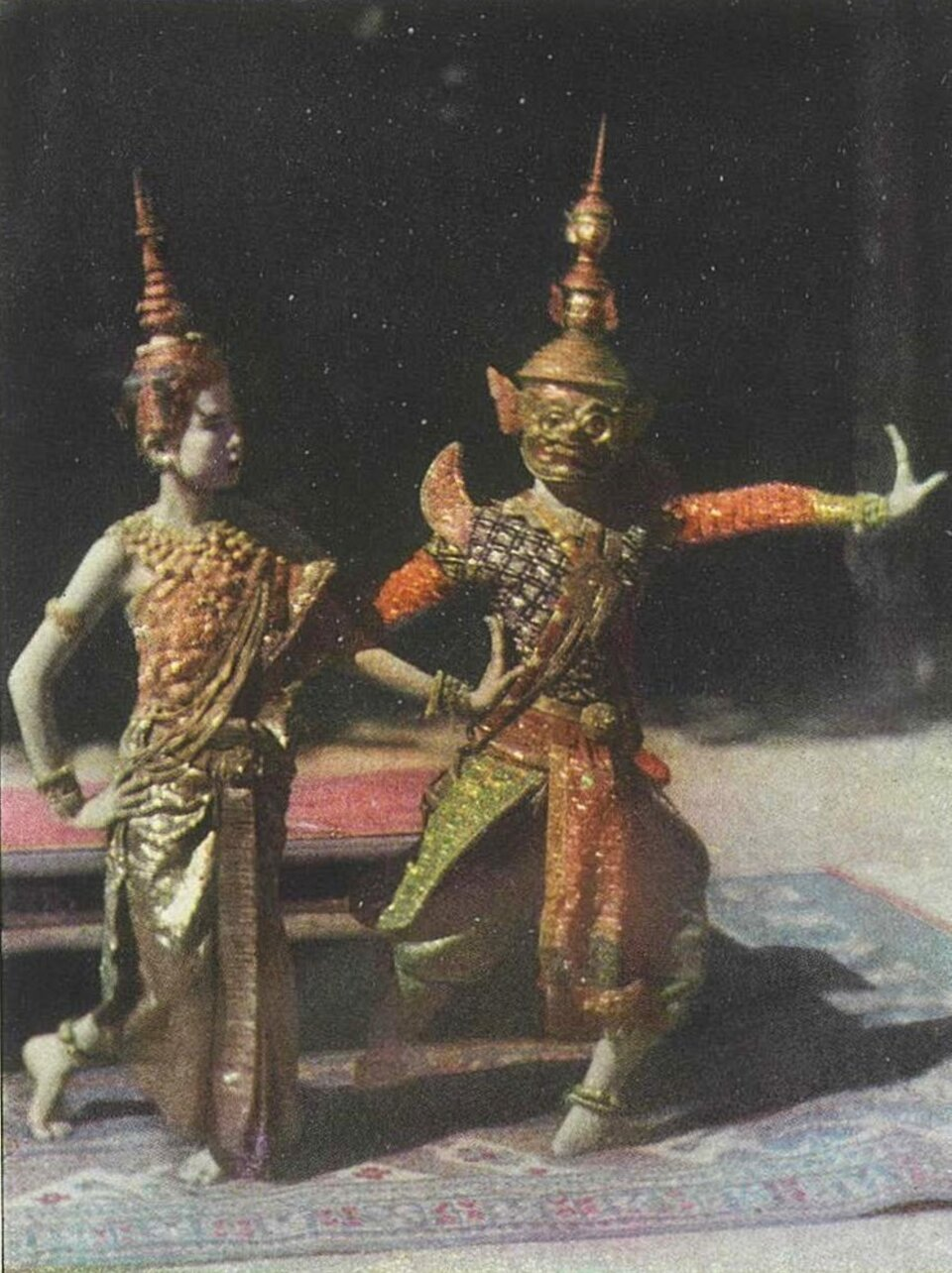
Phnom Penh, 1921, published 1928.

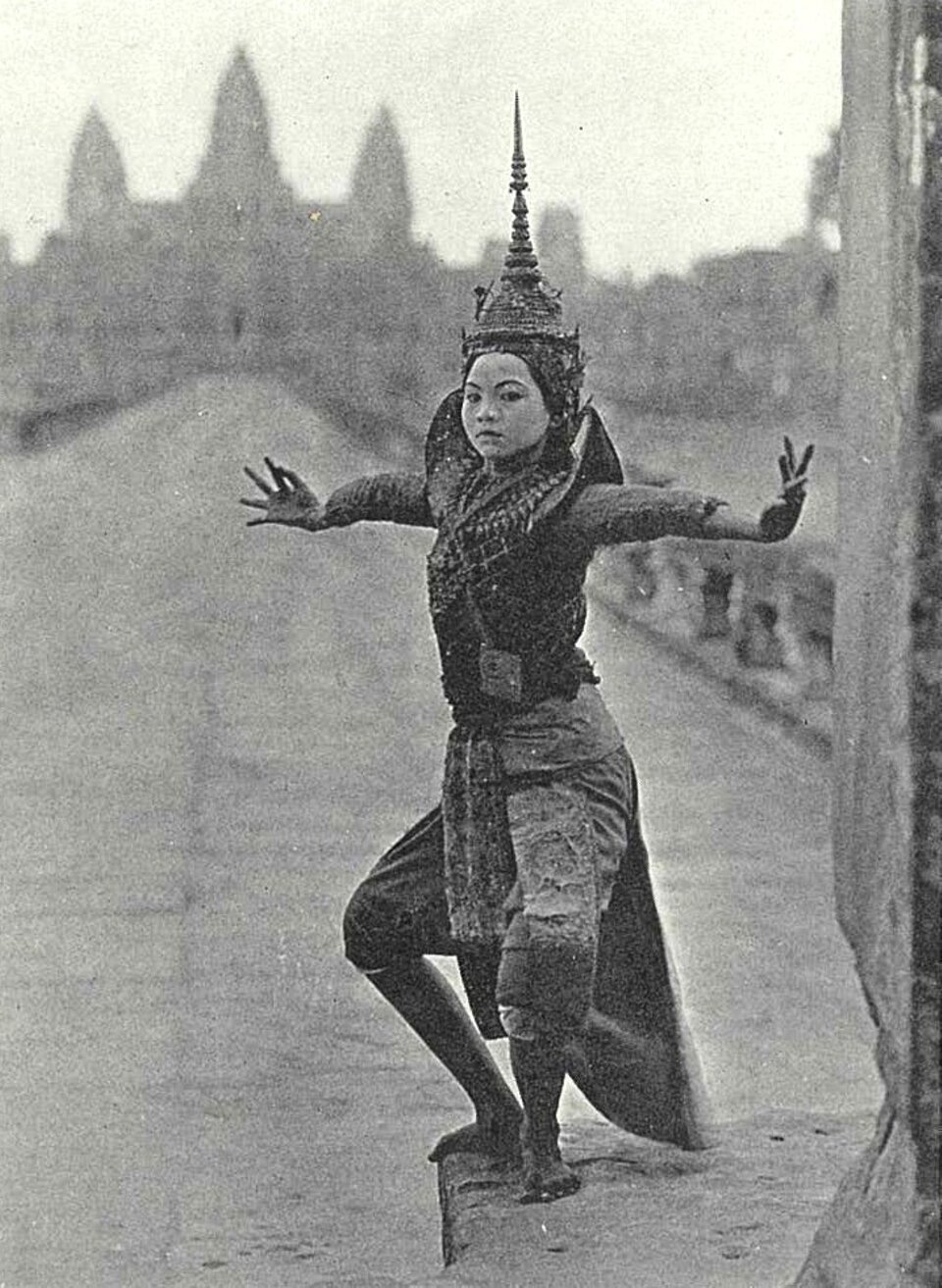
Khmer dancer at Angkor Wat, 1928.

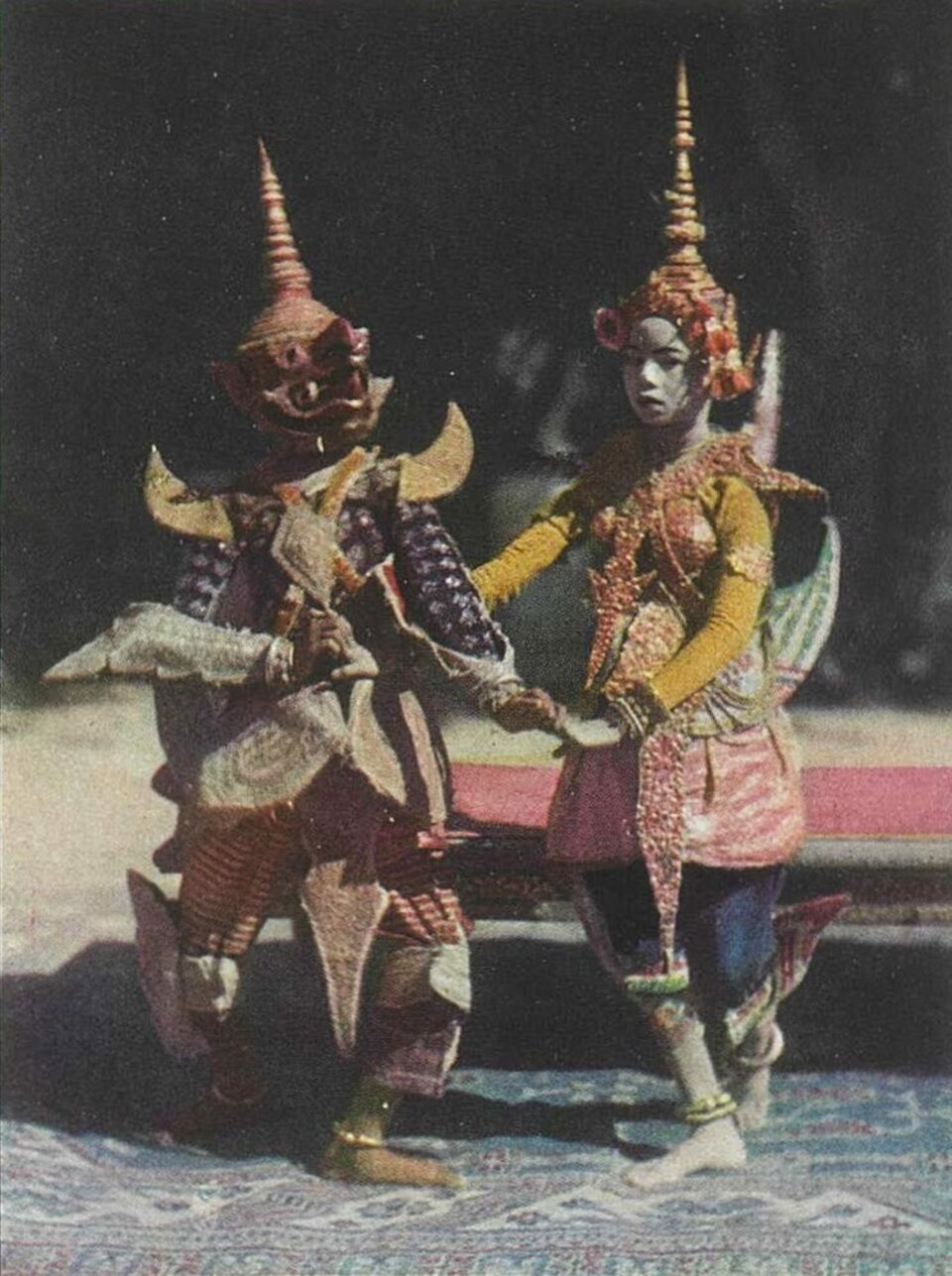
Princess & monkey king, 1921, published 1928.

Thai lyrics in the repertoire were translated into Khmer and Thai lyrics that were originally Khmer were re-translating back to their original Khmer. Early 1920s dancers at Angkor Wat were a privately-owned troupe. Dancer and Khmer Rouge survivor Chea Samy was brought to the palace in 1925 at age six; dance presented one of few opportunities for commoners to enter the palace.

Two dancers remained after Sisowath's 1927 death. His son, Monivong, was crowned as Khmer ballet joined the power struggle between the French and the Khmer monarchy. That year, Frenchman George Groslier once again said Khmer ballet was near death. Thus the French produced an agreement that “transferred control of the dancers from the Royal Palace administration to the École des Beaux-Arts [French control].” Financial constraints compelled Monivong to accept.

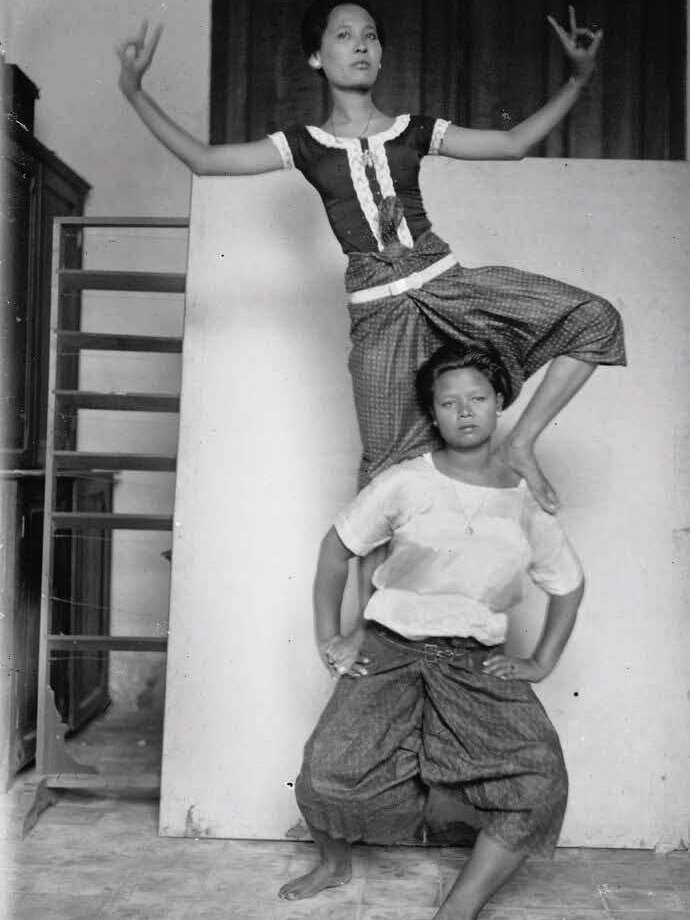
Ith as Vishnu on Garuda, from the ports de bras photos by George Groslier, 1927.

Khmer ballet performance, 1931.

Khmer dancer reclining in costume, 1930s.

"Stage stars of the Cambodian court," Phnom Penh Royal Palace, 1931.

Groslier captured the poses and “ports de bras” of five dancers in photographs: Ith (star of 1922 performance in France), Anong Nari, Suon, Kieuvan (age 19), and Nou Nam (former royal dancer, age 50). While the ballet was in French hands, their jeweler named Phen stole 55 pounds (or 25kg) of the ballet's precious silver and gold jewelry and bolted to Siam (Thailand). French control of the ballet wouldn't even last a year before the troupe was returned to palace authority. Former royal dancer Princess Say Sangvann (អ្នកម្នាង សយ សង្វាន) departed the court over a domestic dispute and started her own. This pleased French authorities who obliged anything needed for her troupe, which would perform at the Paris Colonial Exhibition in 1931. French authorities funded the troupe, deemed them the true Khmer dancers, and permitted them alone to perform for tourists and esteemed visitors at Angkor Wat. Monivong's troupe performed infrequently. Royal dancer Luk Khun Meak conceived a child with Monivong during his father's reign and was thus designated khun preah moneang ('lady in charge of the ladies') upon his ascent. Khun Meak's cousin Loth Sareoun was also among the dancers, The khun preah moneang brought several villagers into the court, including Chea Samy's future husband and his brother, Solath Sar - later known as Pol Pot.

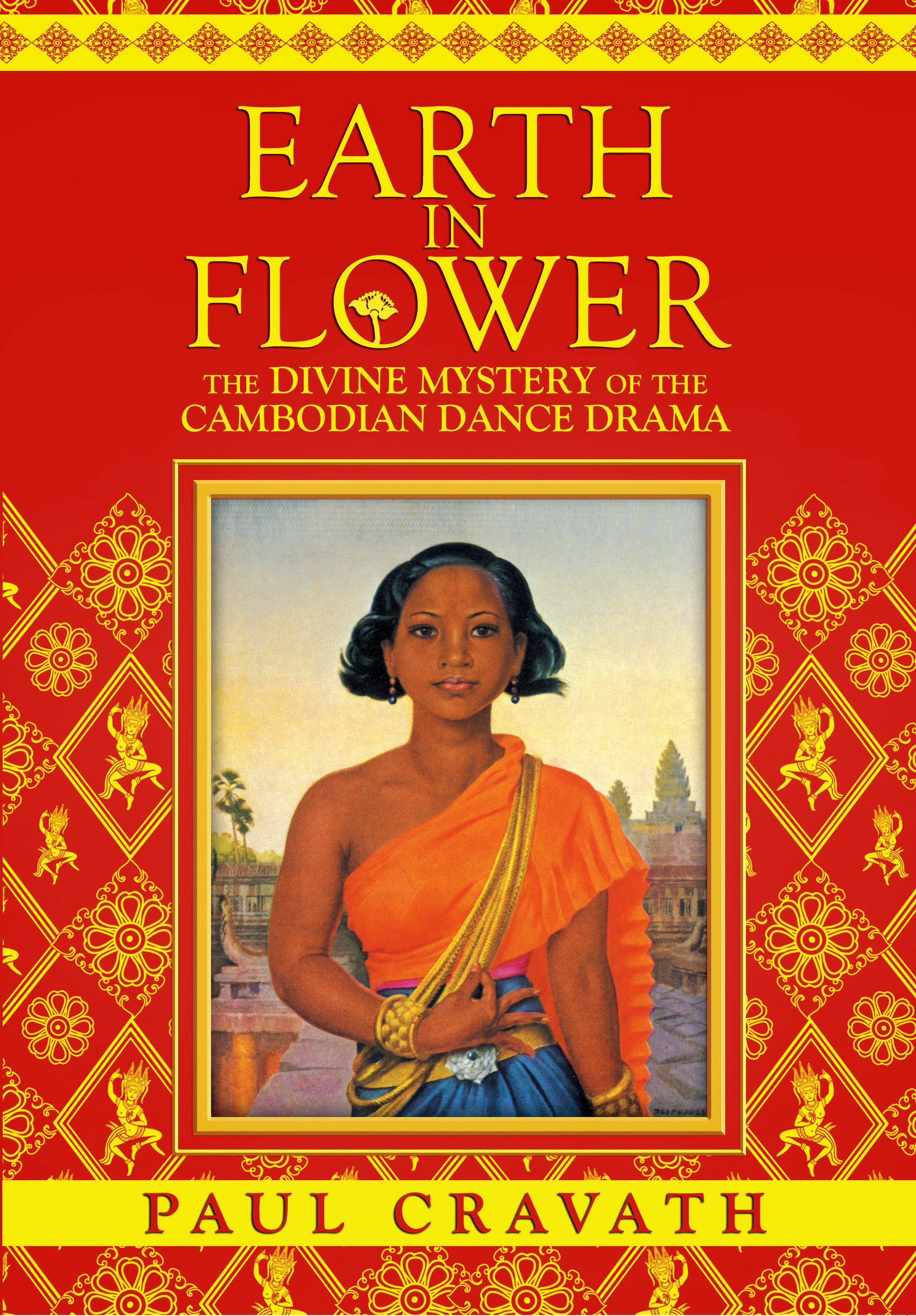
"Saem in Her Festival Attire" Jean Despujols, 1937.

British painter Sir Gerald Kelly photographed and painted ballerinas from the king’s and the princess’s troupe in 1937. Neak Thul, Saona, Chea Samy, and the princess's foster daughter Saem (សាអែម) were among the models, with 897 photos total. French-American painter Jean Despujols in 1937 also depicted Saem posing on Angkor Wat’s Rainbow Bridge. The painting, portraying Saem's hand in Khmer kbach “flower” gesture, is the cover artwork for the book Earth in Flower. Zarina described the troupe's presentation as directed by "impeccable French taste." She studied with the princess in 1937 and observed the troupe sewing costumes and flexing each other's fingers, wrists, elbows, and toe joints in preparation. Zarina also attended a two-hour royal ballet performance on 27 December for the king's birthday.

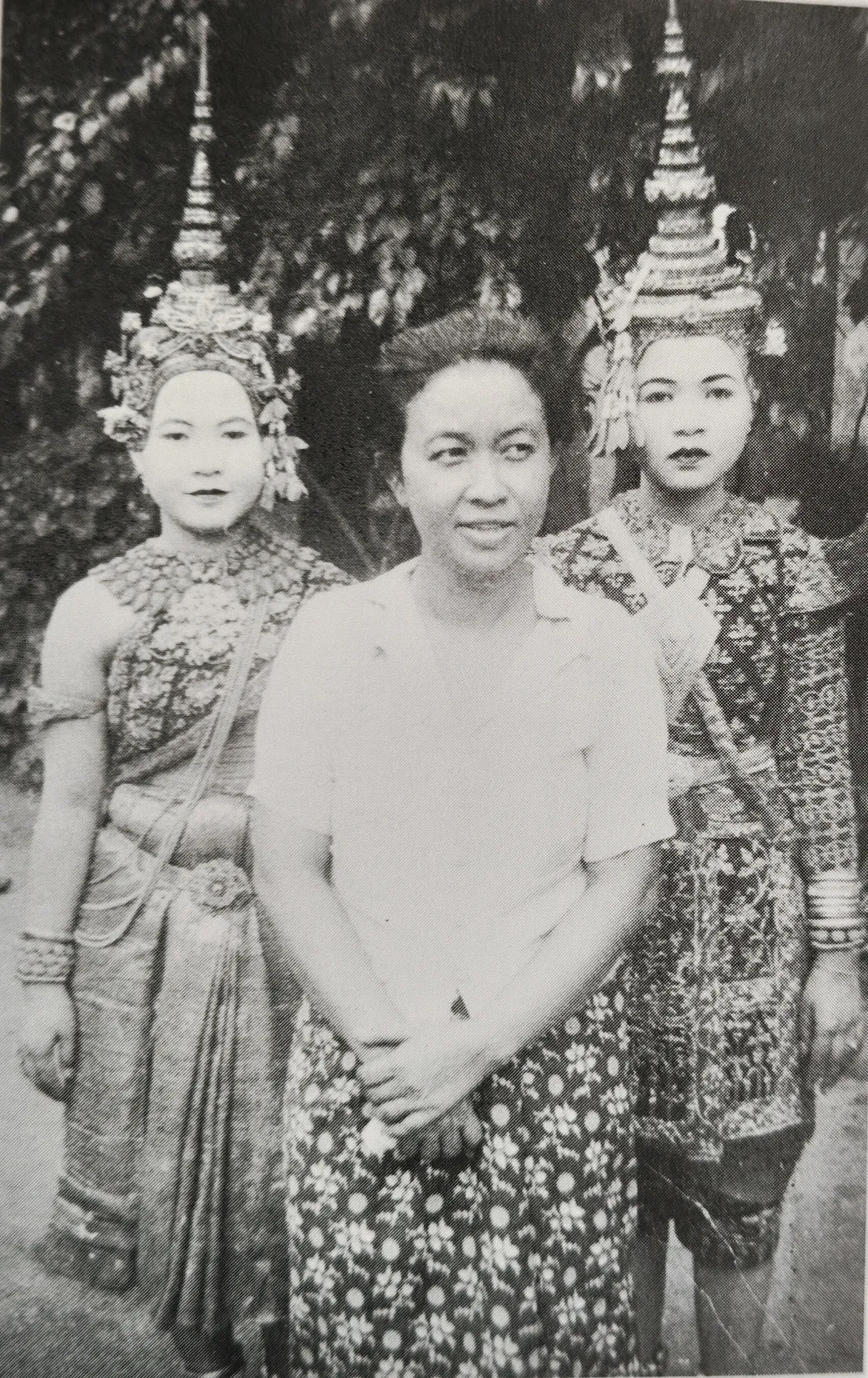
Princess Sangvann with two dancers from her troupe, circa 1937.

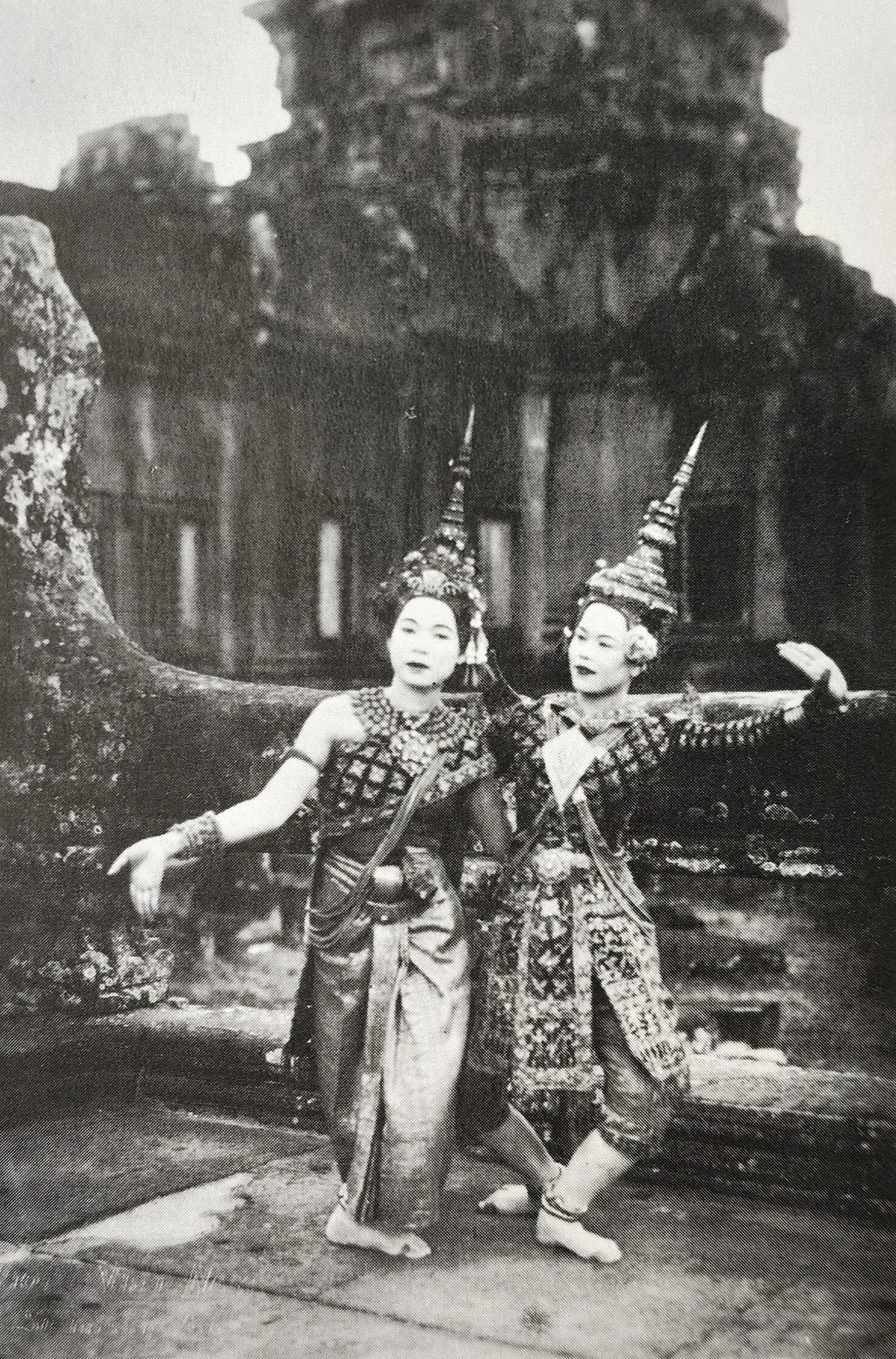
Sangvann's troupe, Angkor, 1930s.

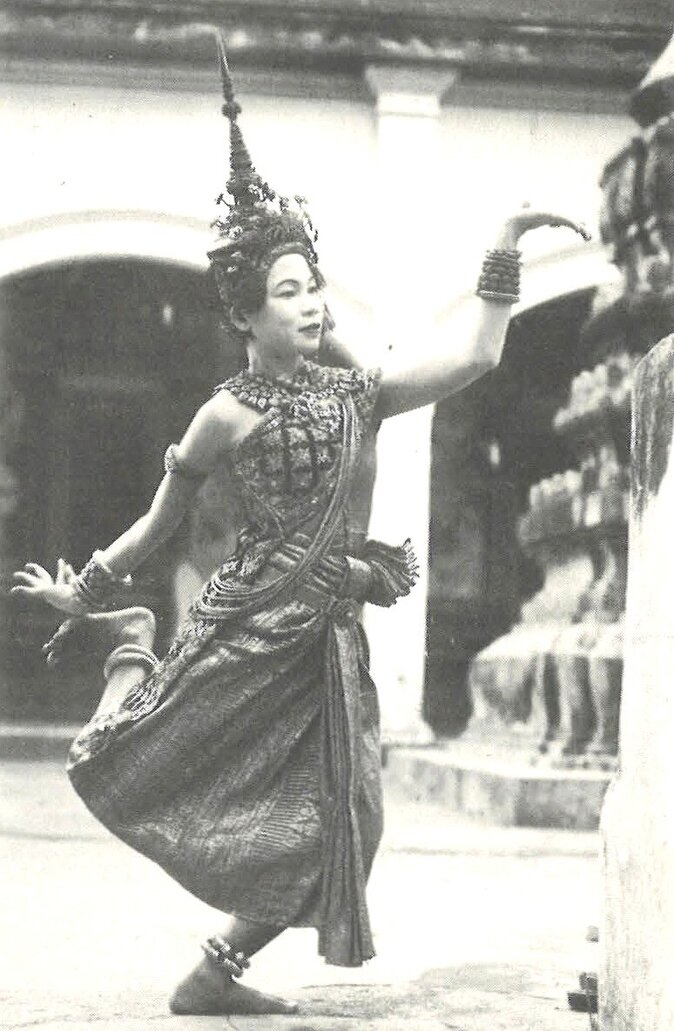
Saem, right hand hamsasya, left hand pataka, 1937.

An investigation had denied Princess Sangvann a passport in 1932, claiming her trip would be to Siam to "collect a dancer named Yeun, sent to Siam to learn to dance in the Siamese manner.” Further, Sangvann was in debt to an “Indian banker" and her dance troupe dissolving. The French ultimately believed the failure of her dance group was "deserved." The last record of her troupe performing was in 1941. Luk Khun Meak created a meticulous program to realize her idea of authentic Khmer dance, having grown dissatisfied with palace dance as well as French influence. She taught an additional 20 or so girls, on top of the palace dancers, and four years later presented the dancers to Princess Kossamak Nearyrath - Monivong's daughter.

When King Monivong died in 1941, Khun Meak rose to “senior instructor." Few palace women remained as under Monivong they were from lower-class backgrounds. It was after Monivong's death that Princess Kossamak - the mother of newly-crowned Norodom Sihanouk - consolidated the dancers from Khun Meak with the palace dancers. Including dancers provided by Khun Meak, there were 48 Royaldancers in 1941. Sihanouk handled the cost for the palace dancers’ maintenance, and it was his goal to debut the troupe to the public. The French thoroughly fought this, having moved control of Palace matters to the "Protectorate" government and aimed to dissolve the royal ballet. Still, for a half year, Princess Kossamak oversaw the palace dancers' rigorous rehearsal with assistance of seven old dance teachers, and took the leap of faith that her troupe was superior to Princess Sangvann’s. Kossamak secured funds from donors for 14 costumes. Vietnamese Emperor Bảo Đại was invited to Sihanouk’s 21st birthday on November 22, 1942, and was treated to a Palace dance presentation tailored specifically to “Emperor and Empress of Annam.” Princess Kossamak’s gamble paid off as the performance was a success.

=== 1940s and Post-independent Cambodia ===
Ballet performance at the Bayon temple, 1949.

Princess (later Queen) Sisowath Kossamak became a patron of the Royal Ballet of Cambodia. Under her guidance, several reforms were made to the royal ballet, including choreography. This first meant implementing a two-hour performance set consisting of opening and closing dances and a drama in between. Dance dramas and a lot of "pure" dances were dramatically shortened while other pure dances were expanded into group theatrical pieces. An example is Tep Monorom, a dance that went from featuring a princess and prince character to a synchronized closing performance of 12 dancers. This reflects the stylistic norms of ancient dances offered to the spirits. Evidence shows Kossamak introduced new dances to the repertoire and likely removed others that were present during her father's (Monivong) reign. To achieve significant contrast of monkey characters from human characters, she welcomed male Khol dancers into the royal ballet to depict acrobatic monkeys - a striking departure from the depiction technique for human roles.

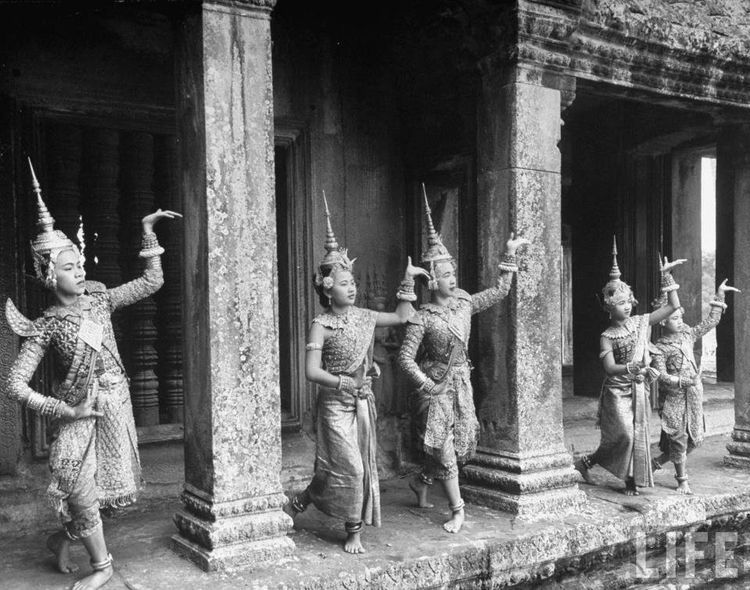
Royal ballet at Angkor Wat, 1949.

After Cambodia's independence in 1953, Queen Sisowath Kossamak began revamping the ballet incorporating the tastes and inclinations of international audiences. By the 1960s, she utilized European staging techniques for performing the dance dramas. For New Year's, the Queen held royal dance performances at Angkor Wat. Flood lights and torches were placed on the temple for a backdrop, and intricately crafted pieces of (fake) foliage and other Angkorean motifs were placed amid the ballerinas.

==== Cultural diplomacy ====
The Queen commissioned short dance pieces tailored especially for diplomatic events. They were mostly extracted from long, traditional performances such as, Robam Tep Monorom (Welcome Dance), Robam Apsara, Robam Chhun Por (Blessing Dance), Robam Moni Mekhala and Robam Ream Eyso. During these performances, western guests were provided a booklet to explain the dances in their respective languages. In 1959, Sisowath Kossamak visited the United States to introduce Khmer national culture through exhibition performances of the Khmer-American Friendship Ballet, originally titled The Ballet of Khmero-American Friendship. The following year, the cultural ambassadorship programme continued in China under similar name, The Ballet of Khmer-Chinese Friendship. When Sihanouk visited France in 1964, the dance was performed for the first time at Palais Garnier after colonial independence. Over the years, the ballet performances were important part of the itinerary for international head of states visiting the country. The list included Indian prime minister Nehru, Indonesian president Sukarno, Yugoslavian president Tito, French president de Gaulle. Other public figures included Princess Margaret, and Jacqueline Kennedy. Norodom Buppha Devi, the granddaughter of the queen and daughter of King Norodom Sihanouk, was already elevated as the premier dancer of the ballet in 1958. When she turned eighteen in 1961, she was appointed the lead dancer for the roles of a princess. Thereby, she performed at several diplomatic events.

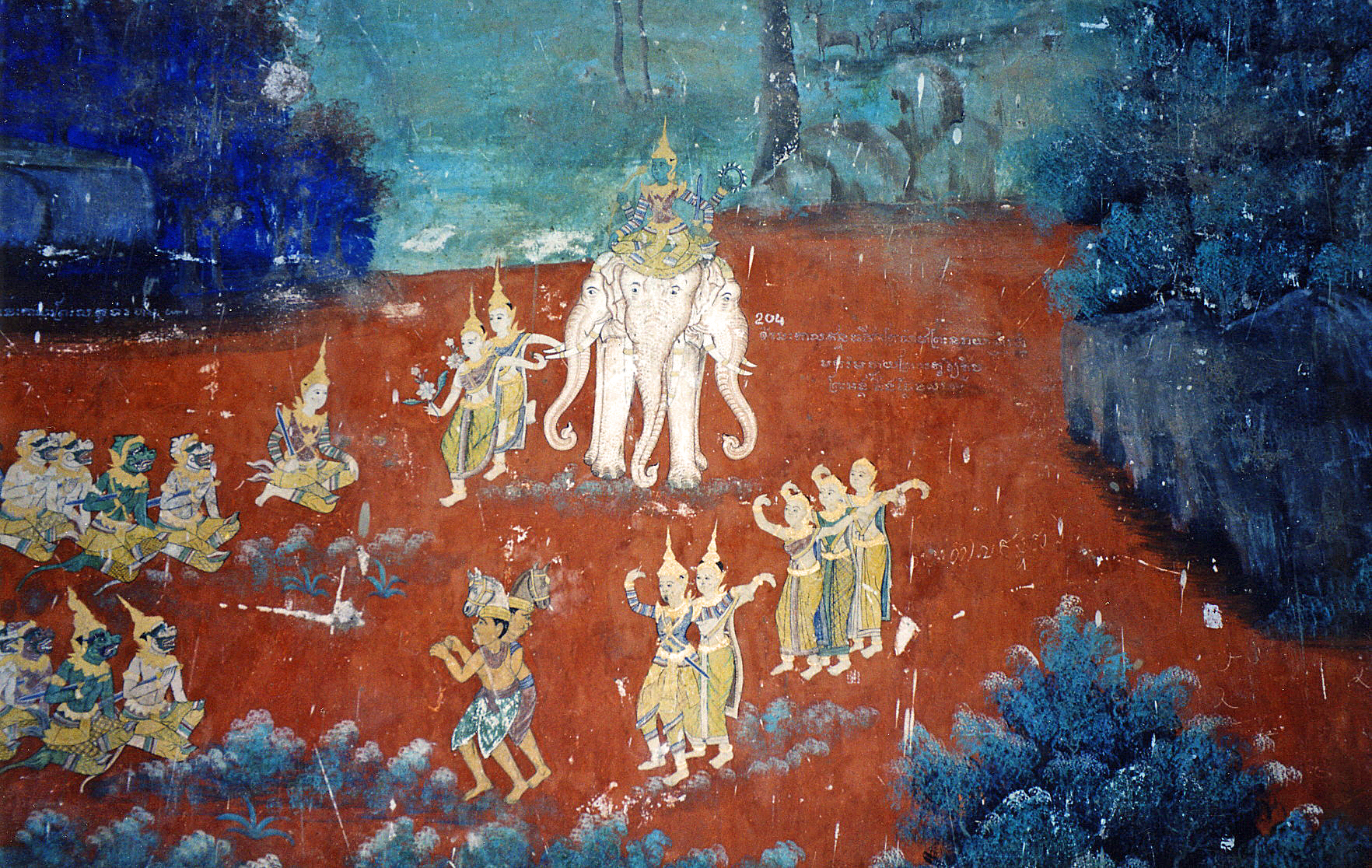
A mural depiction of Indra and his dancers, Silver Pagoda, Cambodian Royal Palace.

Under the Sangkum period, Cambodia underwent its cultural and artistic transformation spearheaded by prince (later, King) Norodom Sihanouk. As a diplomatic design, he promoted symbols of the country's national culture that had entered the consciousness of people across the world: temples, and the ballet. Sihanouk also featured the dances of the royal ballet in his films.

==== Lon Nol's Republic (1970–1975) ====
Valuables linked to royalty in the eyes of the public were in Lon Nol's hands after his successful coup. Whereas the Royal Palace was reportedly known as the "ex-royal palace," the government gladly accepted the ballet as a "continuity." Although retaining its symbolism, now it was known as "The Classical Khmer Ballet."

==== Khmer Rouge (1975–1979) ====
The dance tradition suffered setbacks during the Khmer Rouge regime, during which many dancers were put to death during the genocide. During the period of 1975 to 1979, 90 percent of all Cambodian classical artists died from starvation, execution, torture, or exhaustion. In a forced labor camp, Luk Kunh Meak starved to death. The Khmer Rouge mutilated her daughter's breasts after catching her trying to buy food with gold; she bled out. Renowned neay rong dancer and dance teacher, Sam Sakhan, was executed at Tuol Sleng.

==== Revival in refugee camps and Cambodia ====
Khmer classical dance training was resurrected in the refugee camps in eastern Thailand with the few surviving Khmer dancers. Many dances and dance dramas were also recreated at the Royal University of Fine Arts in Cambodia. After the Vietnamese ousted the Khmer Rouge in 1979, dancers gathered to collectively reconstruct the repertoire. Those who survived came out of hiding, and in time managed to find one another. They formed "colonies" to keep their sacred traditions alive, under the leadership of Voan Savay, a former prima ballerina.

==== Present time ====
In 2003 it was inducted into the UNESCO Intangible Cultural Heritage Lists.

In 2023 director Xavier de Lauzanne released The Perfect Motion, [‘La beauté du geste’ in French, and ‘Tep Hattha’ in Khmer] an 86-minute documentary film on the dance form. It follows two storylines: the Metamorphosis show created by Princess Norodom Buppha Devi, and traces the history of the Royal Ballet from 1906.

== Ritual function and rites ==
=== Teacher salute ceremony ===
Performed before the dance troupe enters the stage, the Teacher Salute Ceremony is a tribute to the teachers who trained them and is dedicated to the spirit that controls the spirit in each of the characters of the Royal Ballet, bidding them to ensure that their performances are smooth, confident and unobstructed. This ceremony originates from an ancient forerunner when the royal dance troupe had to offer blessings before they took the stage. This ritual is typically on Teacher's Day (Thursday).

== Roles ==
Four main types of roles exist in Khmer classical dance: neay rong (male), neang (female), yeak (rakshasa), and the sva (monkeys). These four basic roles contain sub-classes to indicate character rank; a neay rong ek, for example, would be a leading male role and a neang kamnan (or philieng) would be a maiden servant. The sub-classes of the four main roles all perform in the same dance style of the class they belong to. However, the yeakheney, or female Yeak, is performed with a feminized dancing style of the male counterpart. Other female character types, such as the apsara, kinnari, or mermaid, follow the same dancing style as the neang role but with subtle differences in gestures; the main difference being costume. The ngoh character type, although male, is presented with a different dancing style than the neay rong.

Most roles are performed by female dancers, but the role of monkeys was transferred to men under the guidance of Queen Sisowath Kosssamak. Other roles performed by men include hermits and animals such as horses and mythical lions.

=== The Cast ===
The cast is divided into two forms, Neang as the female characters and Neay Rong as the male characters, which are described as follows:

Neang Character	Neang or Female Character
	Neang characters represent women, who are divided into eight categories: Neang Ek (Khmer: នាងឯក): the female lead, the female main character or one of the major characters in a play, film, novel, etc.; usually has a pre-eminent position; deities, queens or princesses (e.g. Sita & Robam Moni Mekhala); Neang Pi-Leang (Khmer: នាងភីលាង): the female servants; Neang Komnan (Khmer: នាងកំណាន់): the mistress(es), the extramarital lovers; Neang Mae (Khmer: នាងម៉ែ): the mother; Neang Kinnorei (Khmer: នាងកិន្នរី Sanskrit: किन्नर?): the Kinnari; a half bird, half human mythological creature; these mythical creatures live in Mount Hem Pean in (Khmer Language) means deep in the Forest Mountain Himalayas (e.g. Robam Kenorei); Neang Neak (Khmer: នាងនាគ Sanskrit: नाग): the Naga; a half serpent, half human mythological creature; Neang Yahkhenei (Khmer: នាងយក្ខិនី Sanskrit: राक्षस) : the Rakshasi; mostly serve as villainesses (e.g. Surpanakha); Neang Sovannmacha (Khmer: សុវណ្ណមច្ឆា Sanskrit: सुवर्णमत्स्य) : Suvannamaccha; the mermaid (matsya Sanskrit: मत्स्य) princess; Hanuman (Spouse), Macchanu (son), Ravana (father)

Neay Rong Character	Neay Rong or Male Character
	Neay Rong characters represent men, who are divided into eleven categories: Neay Rong Ek (Khmer: នាយរងឯក) : the male lead, the male main character or one of the major characters in a play, film, novel, etc.; usually has a pre-eminent position; deities, kings, or princes (e.g. Rama); Neay Rong Bav Preav (Khmer: នាយរងបាវប្រៀវ) : the male servants; Neay Rong Sena Ek (Khmer: នាយរងសេនាឯក) : the battalion commander or general; Neay Rong Pol Sena (Khmer: នាយរងពលសេនា) : the soldiers, imperial guards; Neay Rong Chao Ngoh (Khmer: នាយរង) : the character with memory problems and an undesirable appearance serve as a farce; Neay Rong Ovpuok (Khmer: នាយរងឪពុក) : the father; Neay Rong Moni Eisey (Khmer: នាយរងមោនីឥសី) : the wise sage/hermit, usually the male main character's master (teacher); Neay Rong Krot (Khmer: នាយរងគ្រុឌ Sanskrit: गरुड़) : the Garuda; an avian mythological creature (e.g. Jatayu); Neay Rong Yahk (Khmer: នាយរងយក្ស Sanskrit: राक्षस) : the Rakshasa; mostly serve as villains (e.g. Ravana); Neay Rong Sva (Khmer: នាយរងស្វា) : the human-like ape mythological creatures (e.g. Hanuman); Neay Rong Animal (Khmer: នាយរងសត្វ) : the divine animals serve as various secondary characters such as horses, deer, etc. (e.g., Puthisen's Talking Pegasus - Mony Keo)

=== Pin Peat musical band ===
ភ្លេងពិណពាទ្យ	Pin Peat Musician
Pierre Dieulefils postcard 1662	Vong Phleng Pin Peat or Pin Peat Musician has 34 Tracks in the Royal Ballet, which are divided into two types. The first is the Mohoari Orchestra (Small drum style) and the second is the Royal Theatre (Big drum style) Main article: Pinpeat Krai Thong A song from a scene in the dance drama Krai Thong. The music used for Khmer classical dance is played by a pin peat ensemble. This type of orchestra consists of several types of xylophones, drums, oboes, gongs, and other musical instruments. The chorus consists of several singers who mainly sing in the absence of music. The lyrics are in poetry form and are sung interspersed with the grammatical particles EU [əː], Eung [əːŋ], and Ery [əːj] in various patterns.

==== Musical instruments ====
- Roneat ek : The lead xylophone with bamboo or teak wood keys
- Roneat thung : A xylophone with bamboo or teak wood keys; low
- Roneat dek : A metallophone of brass keys
- Roneat thong : A metallophone (now rarely used)
- Kong thom : A set of 16 gongs arranged in a circle
- Kong toch : Like the gongs above, but smaller
- Chhing : A pair of finger cymbals
- Krap : A pair of wood clappers (now rarely used)
- Sralai : A type of shawm; there are two sizes
- Khloy : A type of flute made from bamboo (now rarely used)
- Skor thom : A pair of drums played with a percussion mallet
- Sampho : A type of drum played with the hands

=== Music pieces ===
Khmer classical dance uses particular pieces of music for certain events, such as when a dancer enters or leaves a scene, or performs certain actions, such as flying or walking. These musical pieces are arranged to form a suite. New pieces of music are rarely created.

Below is a select list of music pieces used in the repertoire:

- Sathukar : (សាធុការ) a song of blessing used for propitiation, often used to commence a performance
- Krao nai : (ក្រៅណៃ), also known as santheuk knong (សន្ធឹកក្នុង), overture of the yeak (ogre) characters, a display of power as they go into combat or battle
- Smaeu : (ស្មើ) used for the introduction of a character or a group of dancers in a scene
- Lea : (លា) used to present a character's departure from the scene; leaving the stage
- Cheut chhing : (ជើតឈិង) lit., euphonic chhing; music characterized by the constant percussion of drums and small cup-shaped cymbals; used to present an action such as commencing a journey or flying
- Lo : (លោ) music used in tune with aquatic recreation (e.g. dancers miming the action of rowing a boat)
- Long song mon : (លងស៊ងមន) lit., "royal bathing of the Mon"; a song used to represent a character dressing up their appearance
- Phya deun : (ផ្យាឌើន); also known as ponhea daeur (ពញ្ញាដើរ), a music piece used to present dancers marching (e.g. the beginning of robam tep monorom)
- Klom : (ក្លុម) used to show the grace and beauty of a character wielding his weapon
- Sinuon : (ស៊ីនួន) - lit., "cream color", in reference to complexion, a soft and slow feminine melody
- Salamar : (សលមារ) - a music characterized by the sralai, often used for certain actions such as combat, but not limited to such
- Preah Thong (ព្រះថោង)
- Bao Lut (បោលុត)
- Sarak Burong (សរៈប៊ុរង)
- Balim (បលិម)

=== Singing group ===
ក្រុមចម្រៀង នៃរបាំព្រះរាជទ្រព្យ	The Singing Group of the Royal Ballet of Cambodia
	The singing group is divided into three parts: women who sing for the neang (female) characters, men who sing for the neay rong (male) characters, and a chorus. The singers narrate the actions of the dancers through song and body language.

== Performance ==
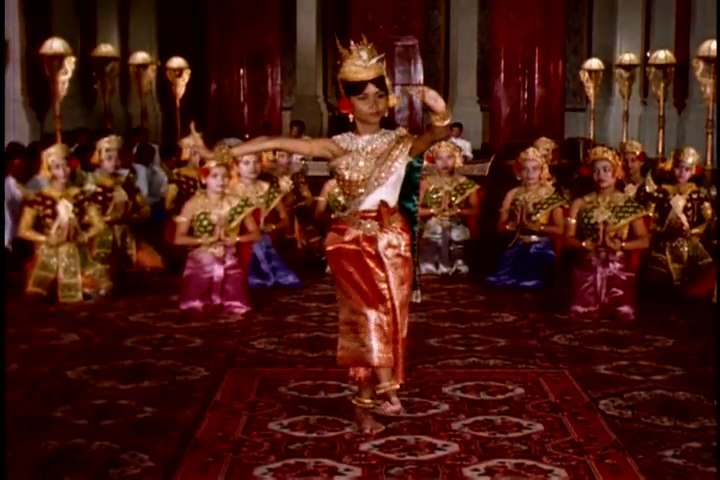
Princess Buppha Devi performs a propitiation dance (c. 1965) as a neang rong. Note the dancers of lower ranks (philieng) in obeisance.

During the era of the French Protectorate of Cambodia and before, it was customary for guests of the royal palace to receive a performance of the royal ballet. In propitiation ceremonies (បួងសួង, buong suong), it was performed at Wat Phnom and the Silver Pagoda and Throne Hall of the Royal Palace. For entertainment, performances were often staged inside the pavilions of royal palaces.

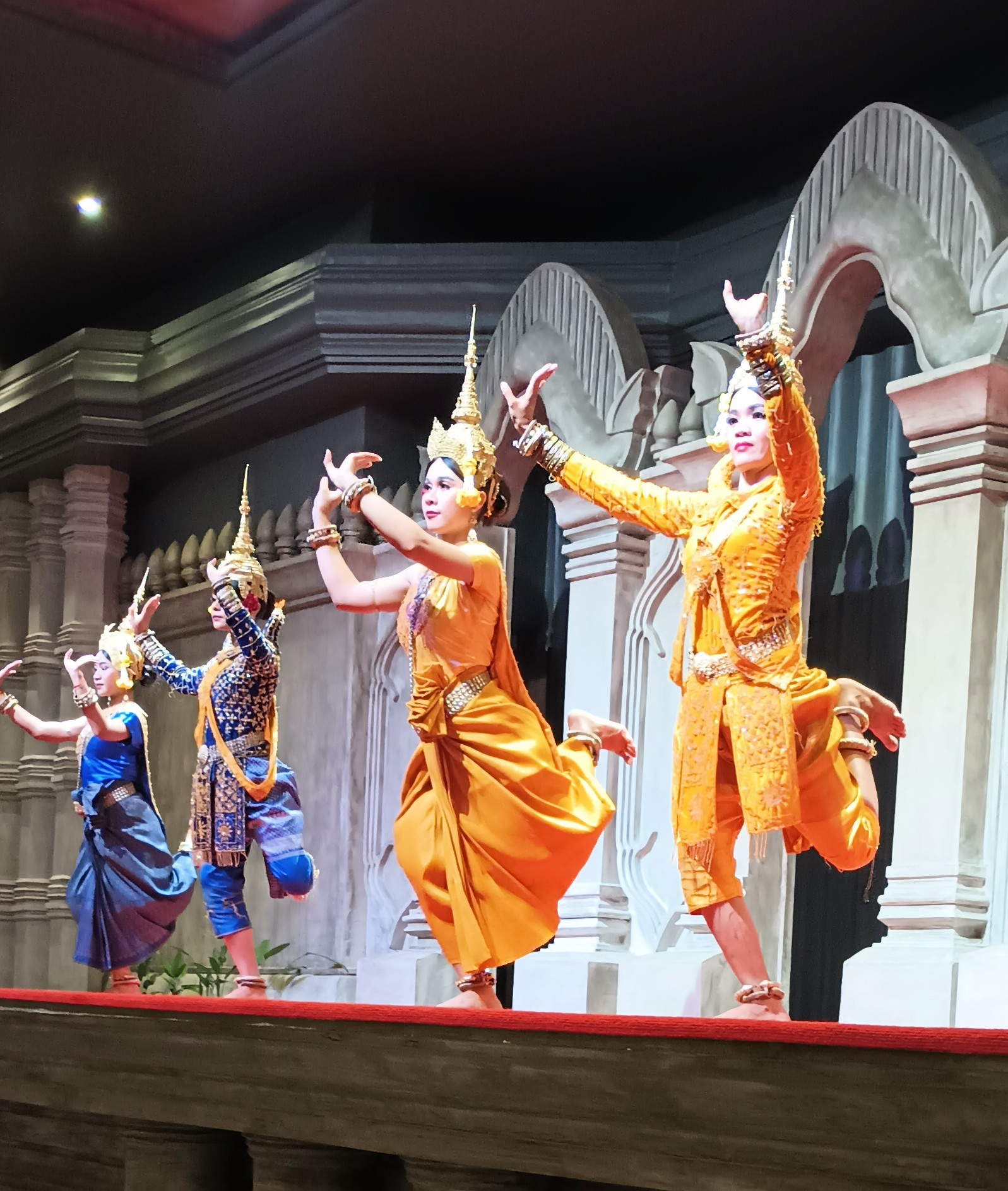
Robam Tep Monorom performed in a Siem Reap restaurant.

In Phnom Penh, the Moonlight Pavilion was built for and is still used occasionally for classical dance performances. Nowadays, venues for performances by the Royal Ballet include the Chenla Theatre and the Chaktomuk Conference Hall, designed by architect Vann Molyvann during the Sangkum Reastr Niyum era. Tourist restaurants in Cambodia, notably in Siem Reap, also serve as venues for classical dance performances by amateur troupes.

Today, some dancers are linked to government and work at the Royal University of Fine Arts and Secondary School of Fine Arts as teachers. Ministry of Culture and Fine Arts (Cambodia)'s Department of Performing Arts also engage dancers to perform on state visits. Many dancers work in the tourism, art, and corporate sectors.

=== Stage and props ===
The traditional stage for classical dance drama performances contains a table with a decorative pillow, sometimes laid on an Oriental rug or carpet. This table of low stature, called a krae (គ្រែ, lit. "bed"), is constant throughout the performance and thus is used as a prop that represents many places and things (a bed, a throne, living quarters, etc.).

In many dance dramas, characters often wield weapons such as bows, swords, staves, and clubs. In some dances, dancers hold items such as flower garlands, fans, and gold and silver flowers as a tribute (see bunga mas). Performances of robam makar (the makara dance) entail devas dancing in leisure and using fans to represent the scales of the mythical makara while the goddess Manimekhala leads the mimicry with her crystal ball of magic.

== Movement and gestures ==
Khmer classical dancers use stylized movements and gestures to convey meaning and tell a story. These gestures are often vague and abstract, though some may be easily understood. Dancers do not sing or generally speak, except in some dance dramas where there are brief instances of speech by the dancers.

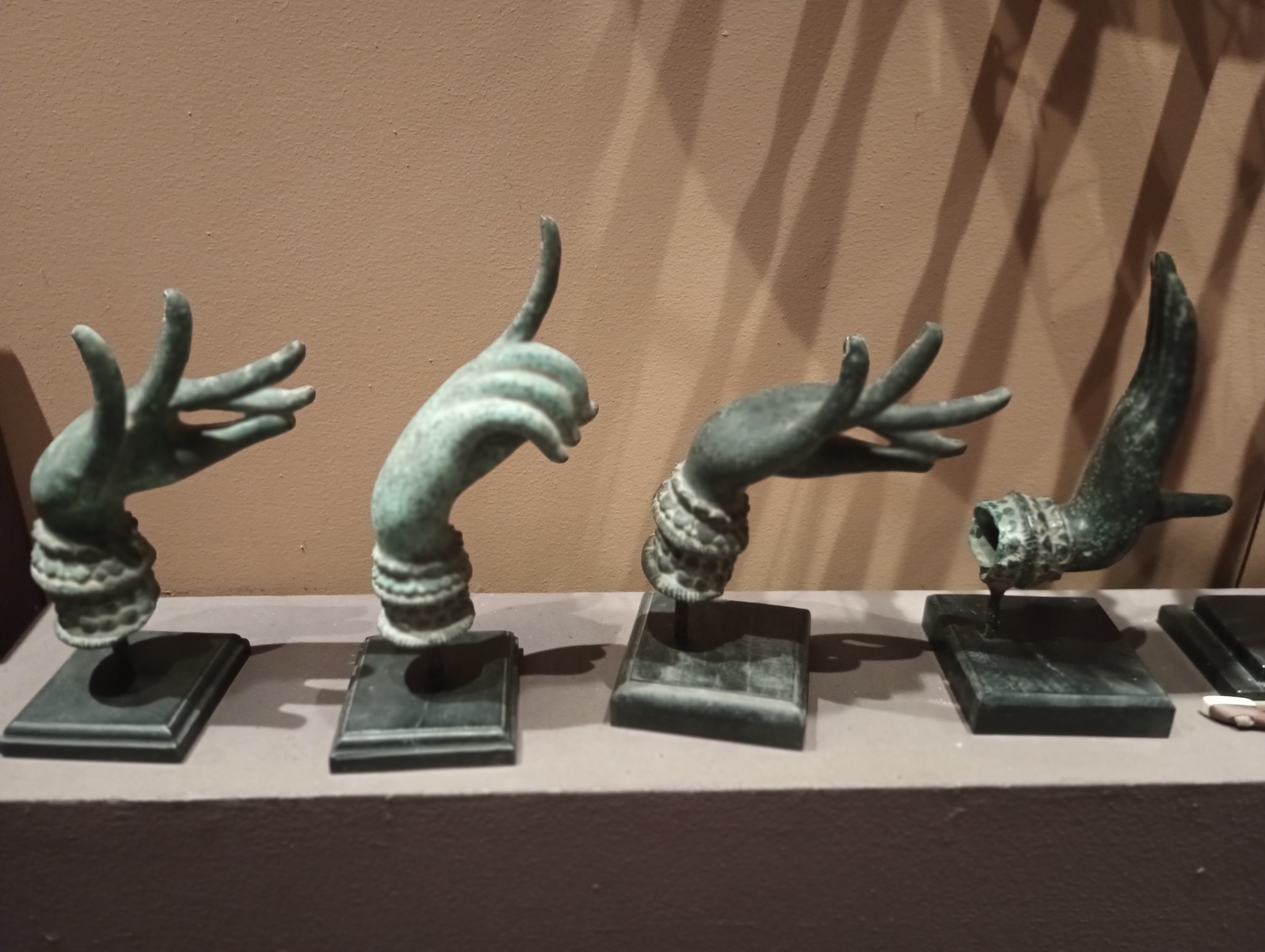
Sculpted depiction of Khmer kbach (referring to dance hand gestures)

Hand gestures in Khmer classical dance are called kbach (meaning "style"). These hand gestures form a sort of alphabet and represent various things from nature such as fruit, flowers and leaves. They are used in different combinations and transitions with accompanying movement of the legs and feet to convey different thoughts and concepts. The way gestures are presented, the position of the arm, and the position of the hand relative to the arm can affect their meaning. Gestures are performed in different manners depending on the character type.

== Costume ==
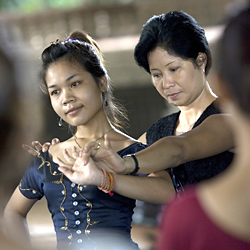
Khmer youngster during dance practice.

Both sexes both wear cotton sampot chang kben for rehearsal and training. Girls wear a form-fitted, button-up blouse called aaw nay.

The costuming process entails sewing the garments onto the dancer, which lasts lasts multiple hours.

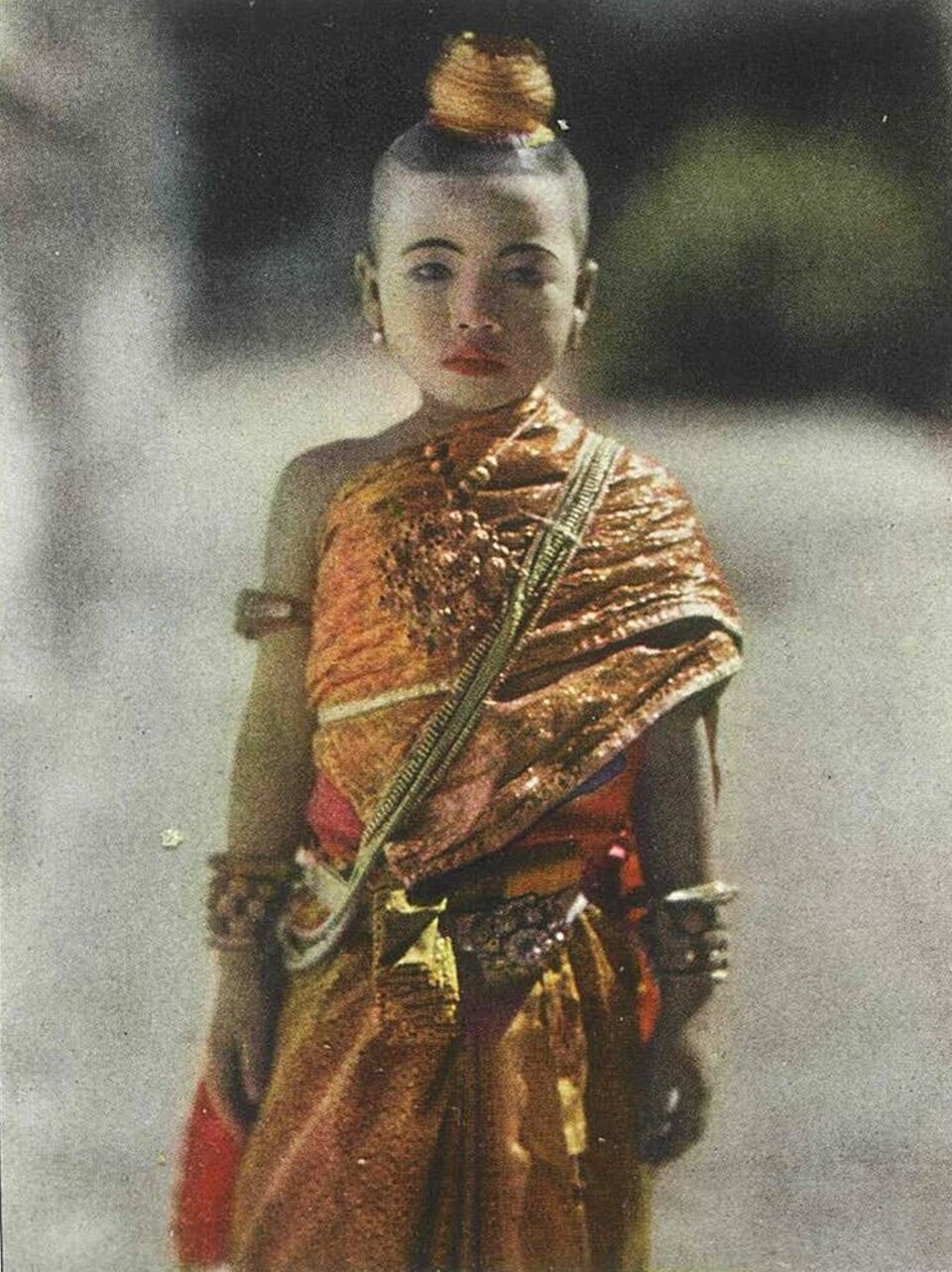
Khmer princess dressed for hair-cutting ceremony, 1928.

The intricate Khmer ballet costumes bear a lot of brocade and embroidery, and often also authentic gemstones and sequins. Most of the costumes are thought to be representative of what divinities wear. Royal dancer costumes closely resemble ceremonial costumes. The "dancer-prince" costume is basically the same as that of a king at coronation. Likewise the "dancer-princess" costume is near indistinguishable from that of brides and a girl's hair-cutting ritual. There are elements of outside origin, such as shoulder wings (indanu) found in Indonesian dance long before use in Lao, Thai or Khmer dance, though the foundational Khmer dance costume and jewelry is gleaned from Angkor and it's precursors, as well as pop fashion.

=== Female costume ===
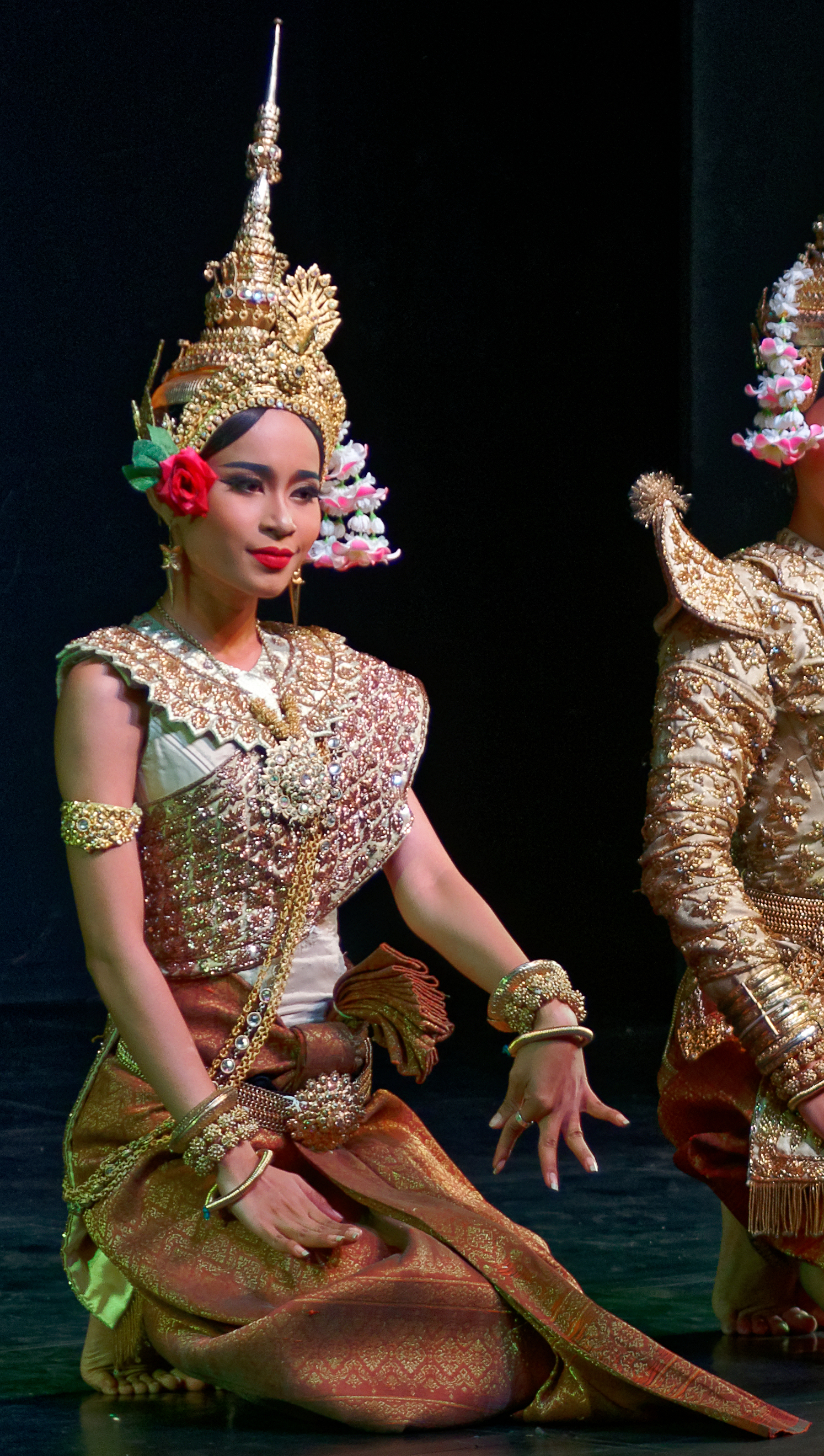
Khmer neang (female) lead. Sampot worn in Khmer sampot sarobap ka'at kbal neak (sampot folded like the head of a naga) style.

Princesses, queens, and goddesses are highest rank, called neang ek. Over a slip called ao sbay, the typical female costume consists of a sampot charobab/sarobap (or sampot robab), a sampot with contrasting silk threads, and gold and silver metallic thread. The sampot, worn samloy-style and also called samloy robab, is wrapped around the lower body and then pleated into a bundle that’s folded and secured with a (often gold) belt called khim khat. The bundle’s draped pleats are pulled to fan over the belt. This is called sampot sarobap ka'at kbal neak, or "sampot folded like the head of a naga" (សំពត់សារបាប់ កាតក្បាលនឥ). The sampot robab of the lead is usually white; supporting dancers appear in sampots of green, blue, and red. Kravat khim khat, an apsara belt, resembles her samrong kar/srang kar

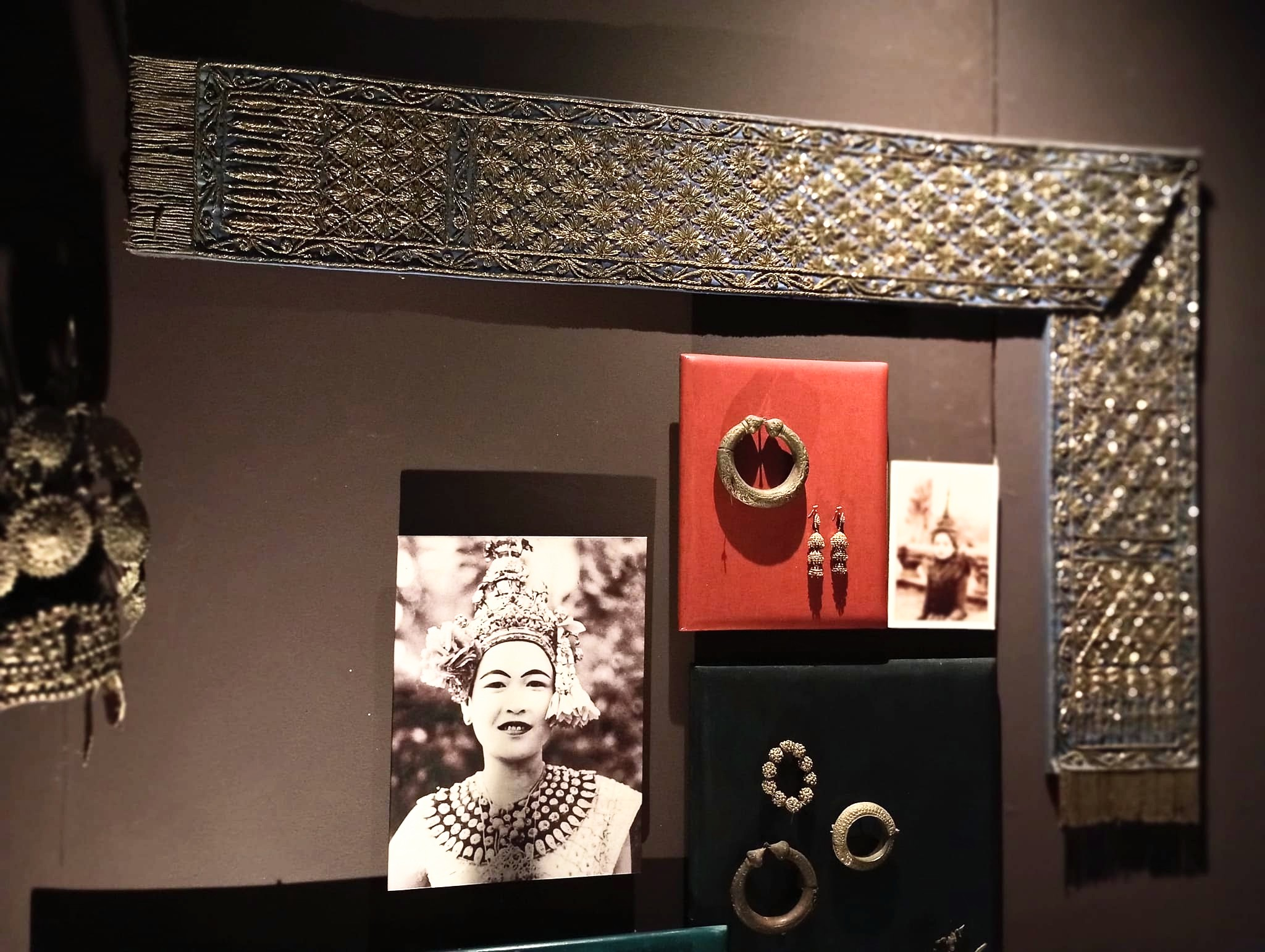
Khmer dance: bangles, bracelet, armlet, earrings, Apsara mokot, & sbai.

A fine second silk sbai (a shawl-like breast cloth) may be included under the main ornate sbai, which matches the sampot and stretches diagonally from the waist and over the left shoulder. A form-fitting (often velvet or satin) top is worn that may have sleeves, depending on the role. This garment is often velvet or satin. For Robam Apsara, silk bodices are worn, usually skin-tone in color, to emulate bare-breastedness.

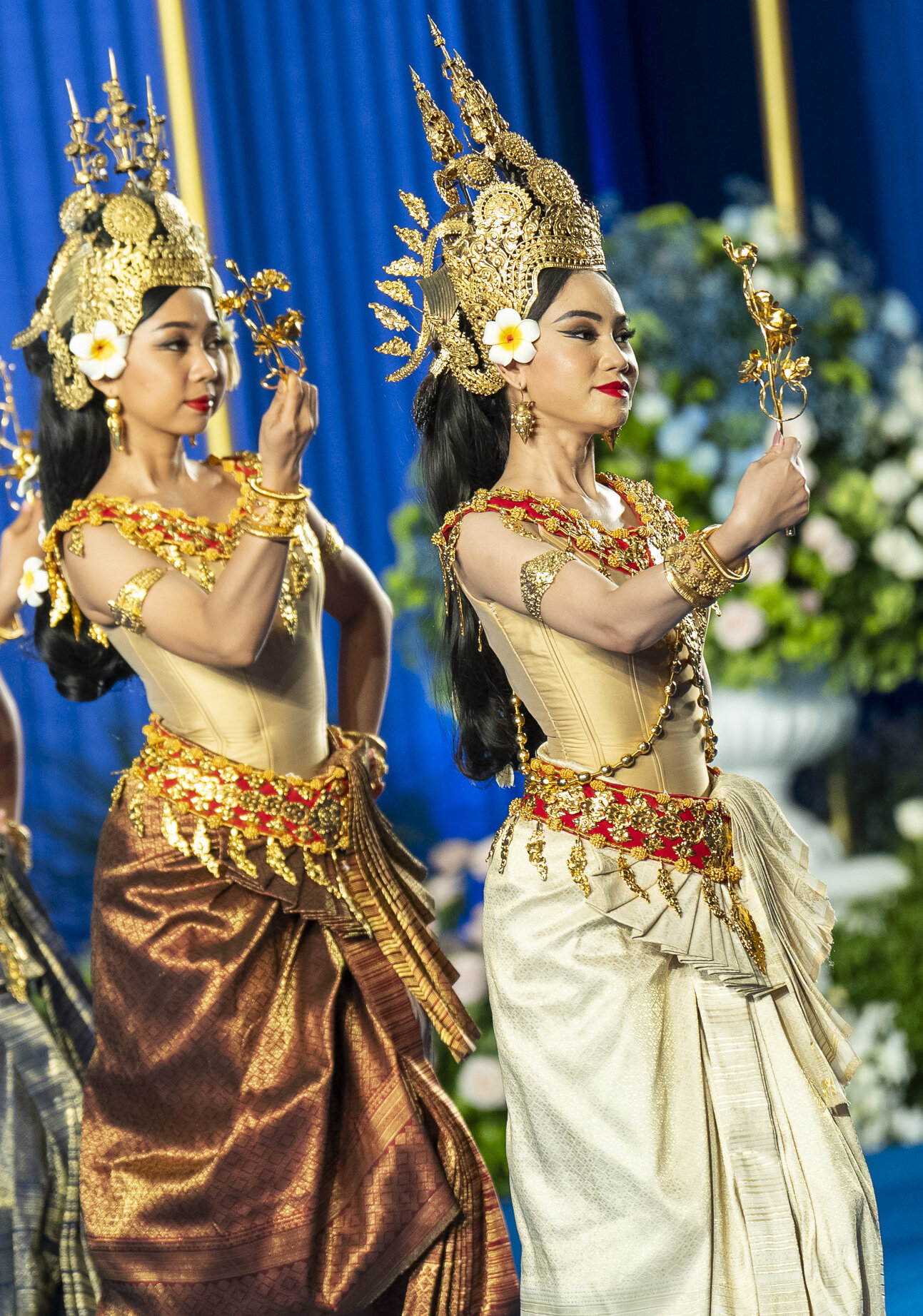
Lead and secondary in Robam Apsara.

An embroidered, ornate collar called srang kar or samrong kar is worn. Except for an apsara, crosswise from her right hip to left shoulder are five chains. She wears a stylized neck pendant. She wears an armlet, called snab dei or baing phap, on her right, like the carved Angkorean women. If depicting an apsara, she wears the armlet on both arms. Koang nhor is a pair of rounded, bunched bracelets (or anklets), She may wear diamond earrings called tumhou. Apsara dancers wear Kra ya, dangling earrings modeled after the mles or kra saing flowers. The patrum (or kantrum/katrum) is a copper coil bracelet. Apsara dancers wear koang rak, a diamond bracelet. The ankle bangles are called kong tong chhuk. If performing Apsara, a beaded sangvar may adorn her upper torso, crosswise.

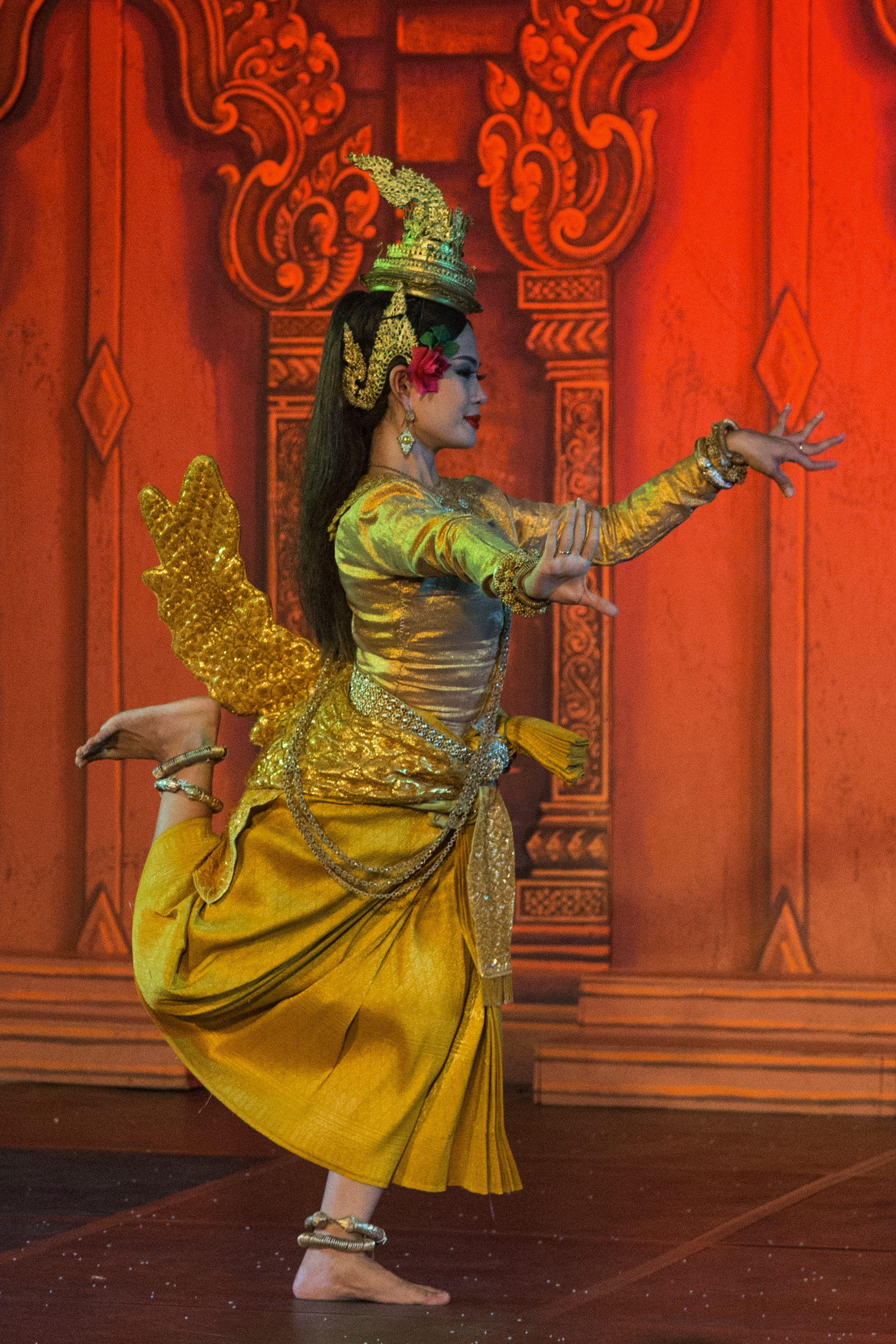
Khmer Sovann Maccha.

Governors and their 20 servants (kom nam) dress similar to Queens, but smaller bracelets, no gems in their armlet, only three gilt silver chains, one anklet, and silky sampot.

Yakkhinis, or female ogres, wear costumes matching the princesses, governors, and attendants.

Kinnari are bird-women. Purple pants and a yellow tail are worn along with gilt brass breast cups, a silky flap (tat), gilt leather armbands, and a leather stomach-cover (phchet).

Sovann Maccha wears a long-sleeved upper-garment, gold of color, and a golden sampot sarobab. She wears a belt and a banner in front, and jewelry similar to the governors.

=== Male costume ===
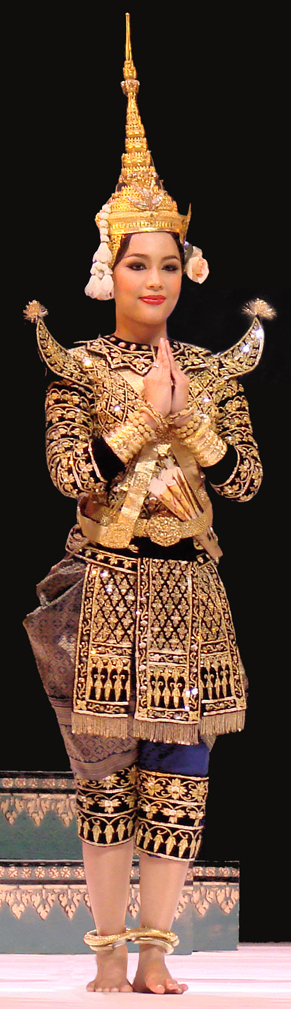
Male lead, or neay rong.

Certain garments for males are more elaborate and often require being sewed as the dancer dresses.

Kings and gods are titled neay rong ek, and along with prince roles (neay rong roang) make up the highest ranked. A sampot sarobap is worn in the chang kben fashion. An cloth called kravat cankeh is wound around the waist, fastening the sampot. Beneath a belt of silver with a golden buckle hangs three embroidered banners, with the center piece known as a robang muk the two side pieces as cheay kraeng. Pants called choeng khor are worn.

They wear a silk embroidered jacket and collar called av pak and srang kar (or samrong kar), respectively. Their shoulders bear a epaulette that arches upwards like Indra's bow (known as indanu, or entam). These are tied around the armpit. Male characters wear an X-like strap called a sangvar. An ornament, sloek po (named after the bo tree leaf), serves as a center of their sangvar. Five sets of bracelets are worn as well as cuffs. Fine wire anklets and a set of rings, kravel choeng and kang choeng respectively, are worn.

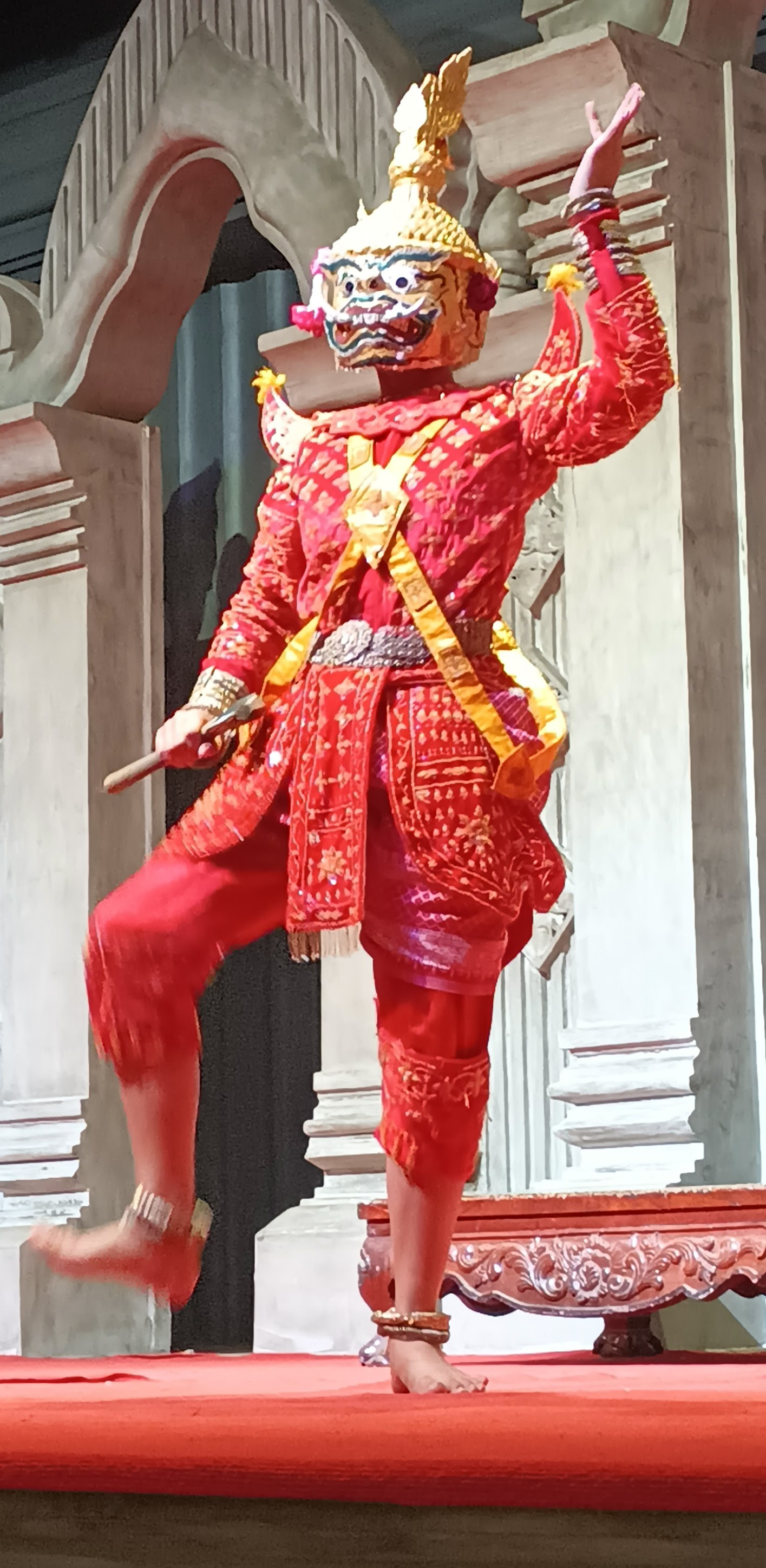
Khmer yaksha Ream Eysor, a jealous storm demon.

The phi lieng ek consists of governors/generals and attendants dress similar to princes except the sampot (specifically lboeuk) is plain silk. The attendants' costumes are less elaborate versions. One set of kang choeng (on ankles) is worn, and their patrum (a bracelet) bears beads of silver.

The following are masked: ogres or giants, the yakkha or yaksha (also yak) who go by rank of soldiers, the chiefs of the soldiers, and officers. The King of Giants (or yak ek) called Rab wears a king's costume with banners on each leg turned-up and are pointed. His mask's point is tall, and his belt holds three kroeus (daggers). The prince of Giants wears the same, though no daggers, and "silver gilt" instead of gold. His mask's point is fashioned into a rooster's tail. Four yakkha officials dress just like human officials, though with masks bearing fangs. Two neay khen yak, or soldier chiefs, wear red silk sampots and jackets, as well as their red attalat saron, or pants, which are longer than the others. On their head is a silky red turban bearing golden flowers, and a silky red tuon across their chest. A yakkha army consisting of 20 soldiers (puok khen yak) wear cotton sampots.

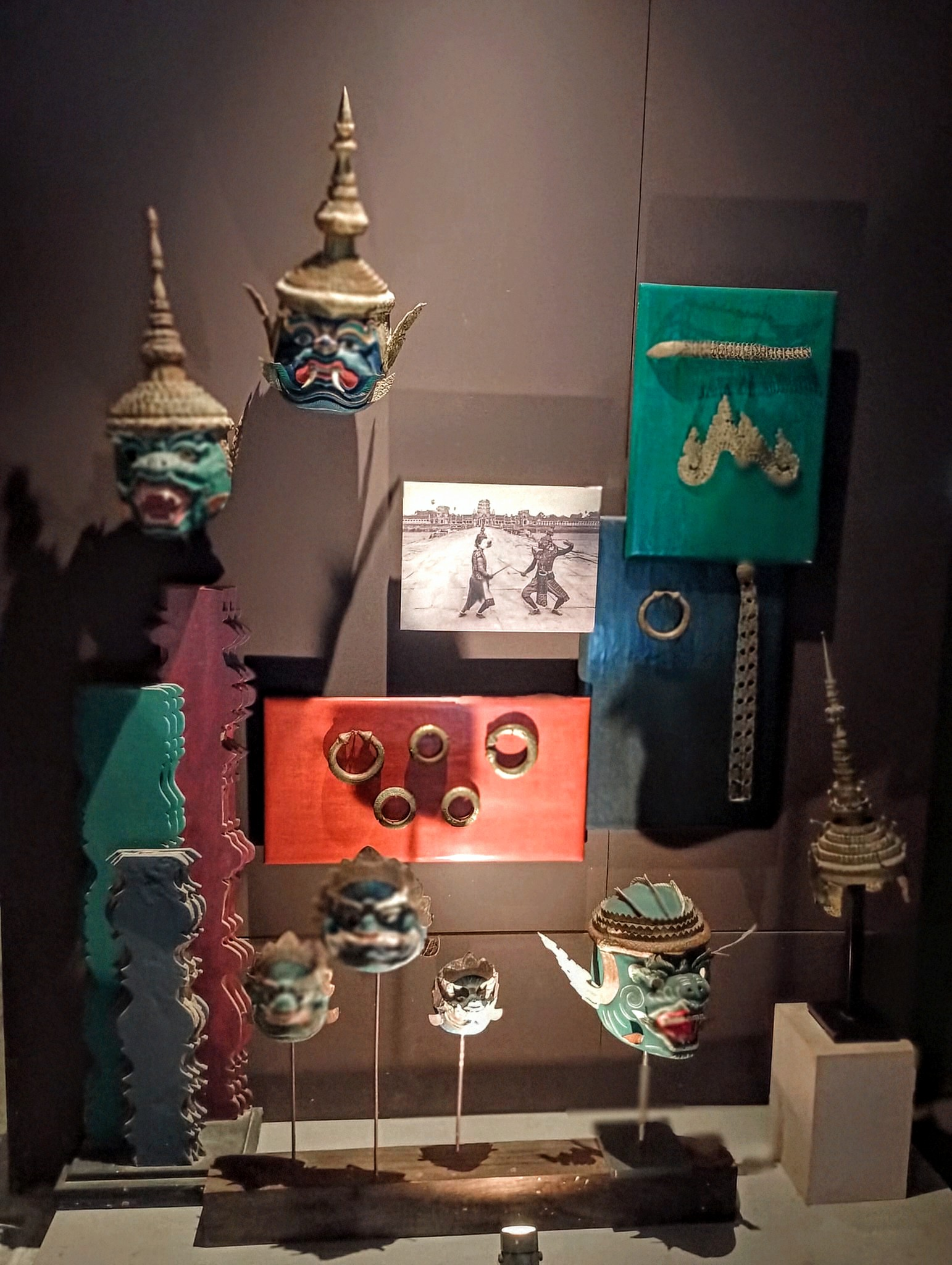
Khmer masks, mokot ksat, bangles, bracelets, armlet, body chain, & jor trachiek ("ear ornament").

Monkeys are the same rank hierarchy as yaks. Costumes are the same as yaks and humans except with a tied silk tail. Masks match the costume colors: Hanuman (or Sva Sar) in white; Bali (or Angkot) is green; Nillaphat (known as Sva Khmao) is the black monkey, and Nilla Ek, Chum Pou Pean, or Maha Chumpou is the red monkey.

For birds, the central role is the King of Birds called krut or garuda. The shoulder wings and smaller collar differ from that of princes. Golden lame wings adorn his hips, and the frame of brass supports an upturned tail of silk. He wears winged wrist guards (snap day), knee pads (snap chung kong) and shin guards (snap choeng) of red brocade silk. The kennara, "mythical bird-men", wear costumes combiningkrut and princes, the same costume as their female counterparts. The sarika (singing blackbird) wears a mask, and dresses in all black. His wings, pants, and jacket are heavy satin, and garters, gloves, and socks are fine silk.

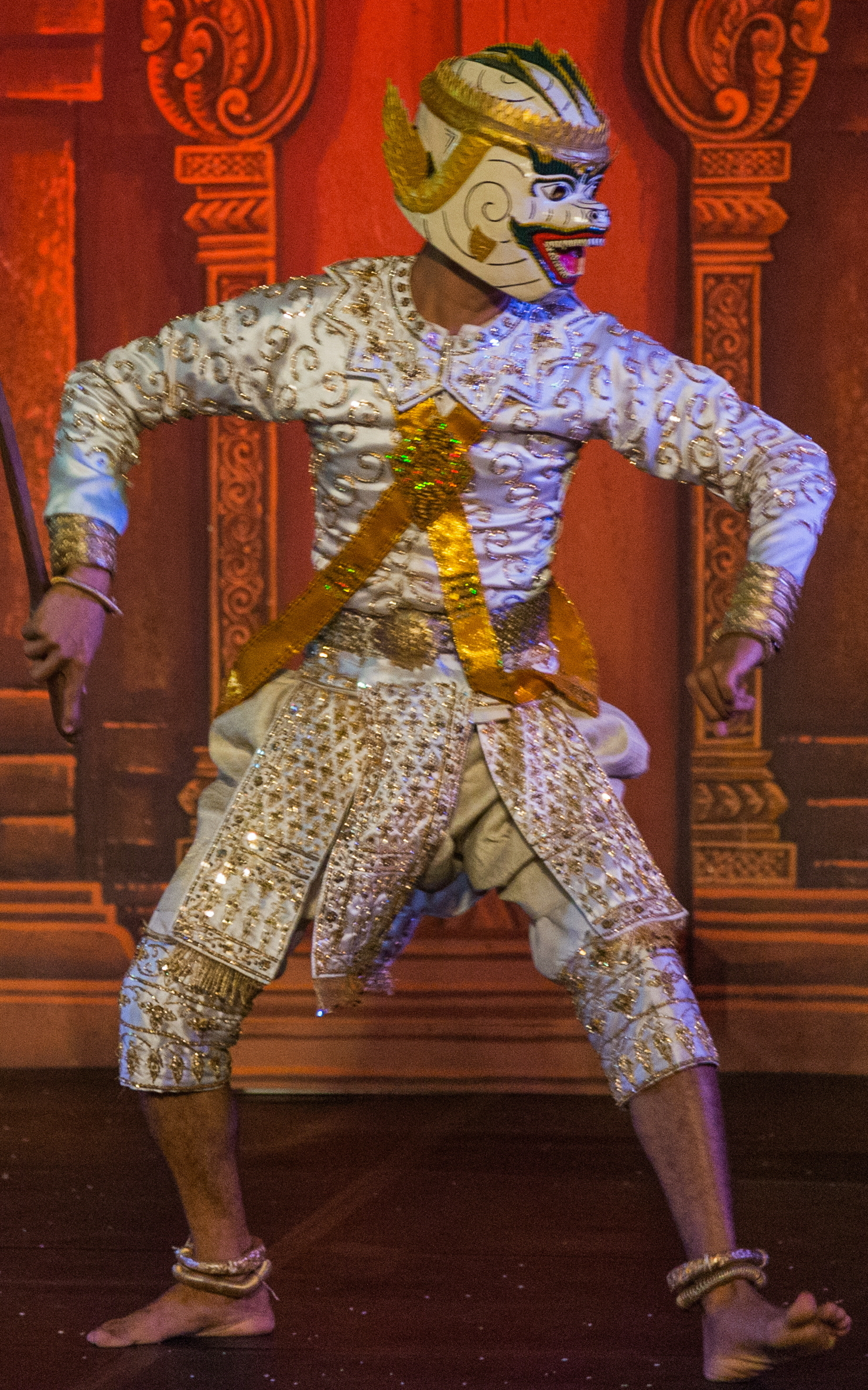
Khmer Hanuman.

Preah Sang, or ngo in disguise, wears the prince costume, plus a red, silky scarf (pha hum) with embroidered black clothing, and his belt is the same as the officers.' The scowling black mask has no crown or spire attached, but he appears in a mokot as Preah Sang at the end of the dance.

The eysei wears a sacred mask and hermit's flowing robe, and wears a helmet unmasked when appearing in a comic context.

Clowns wear golden-floral silk pants and jackets with a pha lay tath, a kind of sampot of cotton. Accessories are left up to the dancer.

=== Headdress and masks ===
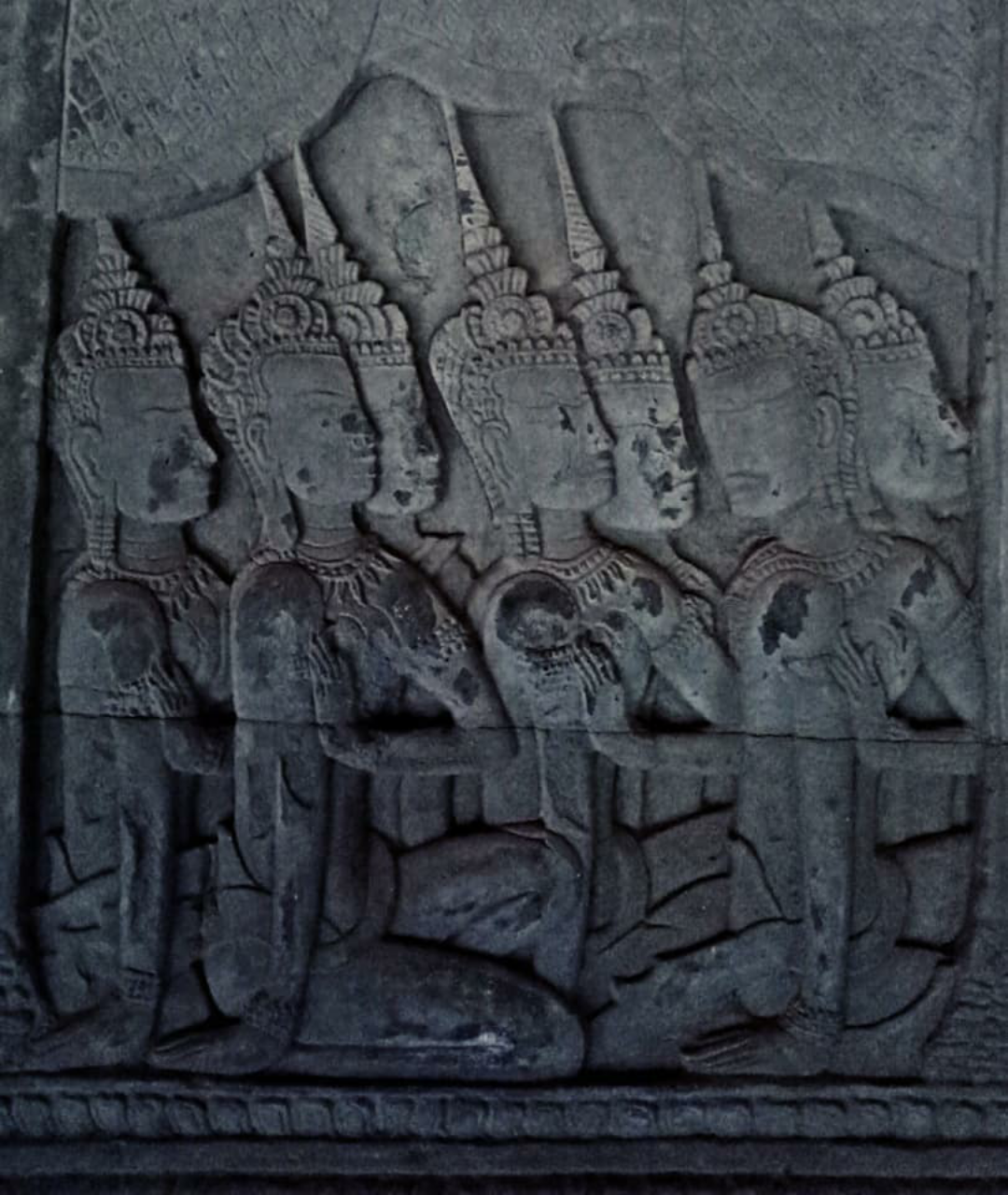
Women wearing tall, single-spire Khmer mokot ksatrey. Angkor Wat, 12th century.

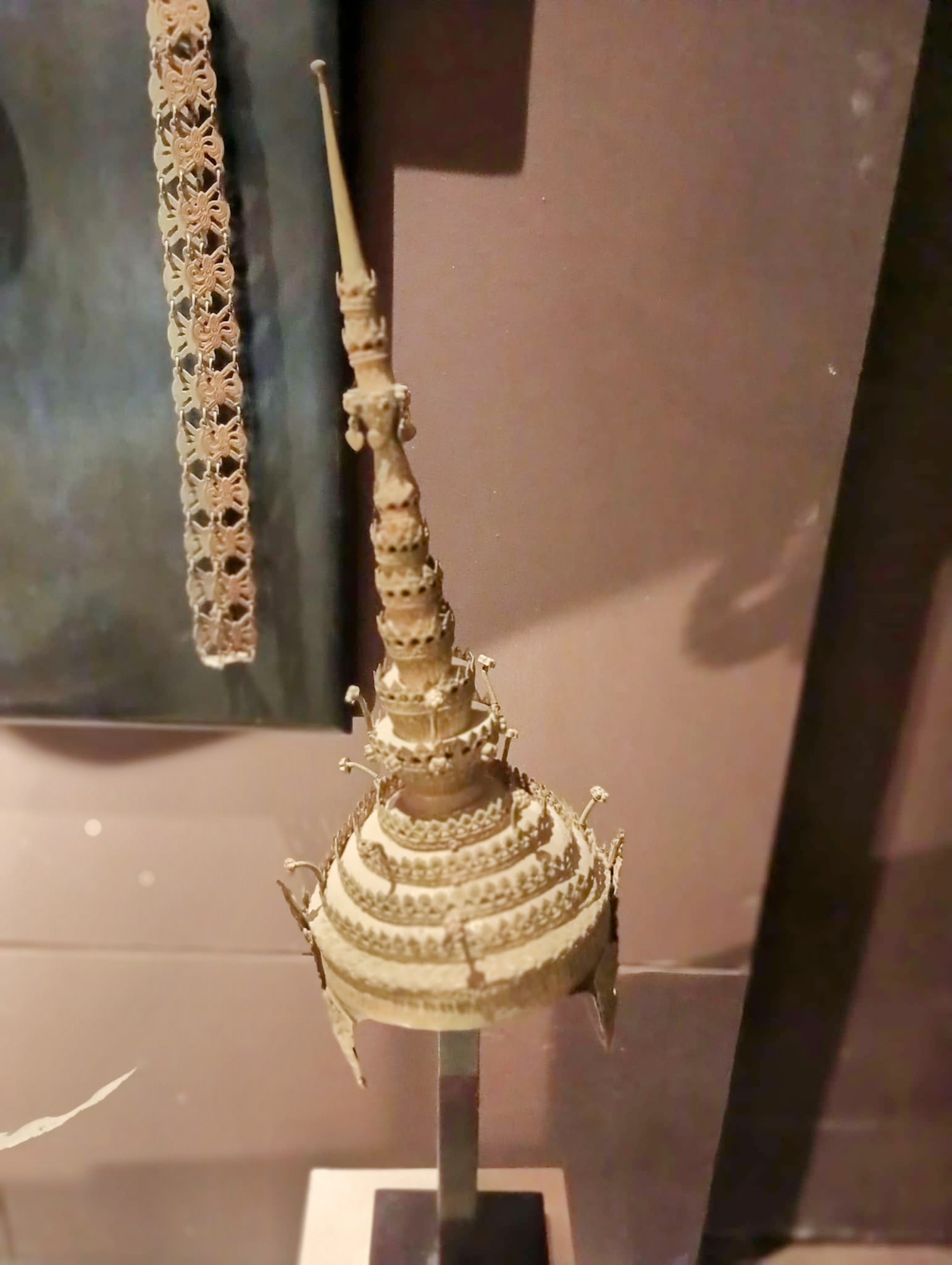
Khmer male mokot ksat.

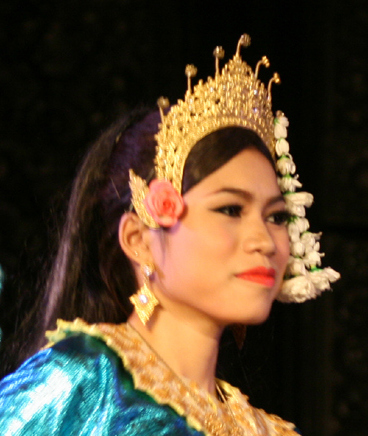
Dancer wearing a Khmer kbang.

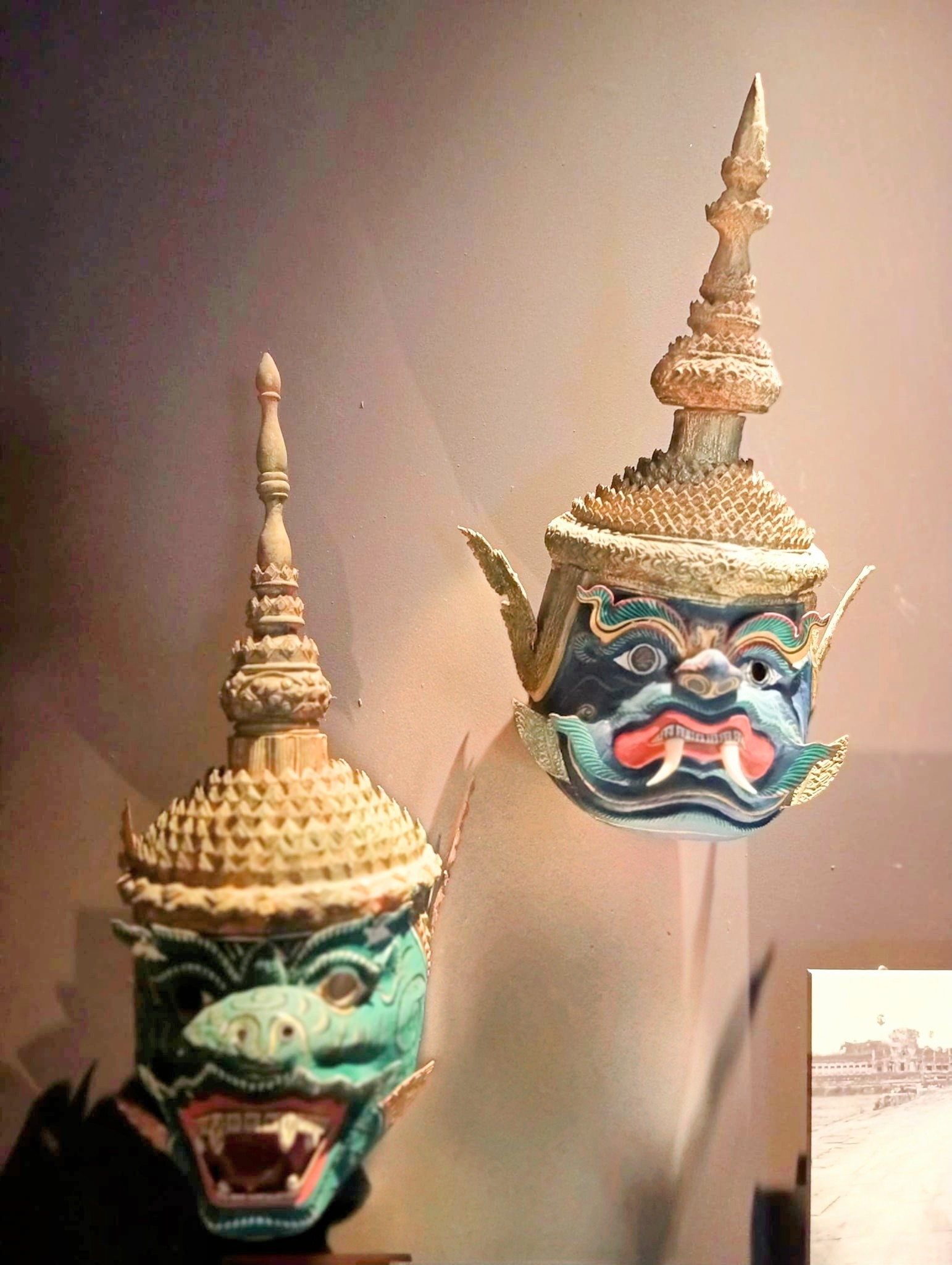
Khmer royal yak and monkey masks with attached mokot.

There are several types of crowns that denote rank. Divinities and royal characters of the highest ranks wear a tall, multi-tiered single-spire crown called a mokot. The mokot originally referred only to the king's crown and now it commonly refers to any pointed crown in Khmer dance. The mokot ksat is worn by males and a mokot ksatrey, with a face-framing diadem, is worn by female characters. This corresponds to the single-spire crowns depicted in the bas-reliefs at Angkor except taller. The ksatrey spire's base rests atop the head, and the base of the ksat exceeds the width the head. The masculine mokot is taller and more elaborate.

The crown of second-rank dancers, the panchuret, is reserved for generals and their helpers. The light-weight crown encircles the head and features faux knot in back.

A low-docked "cone" crown topped with up-pointed wings/flames, mokot kantuy hong, is worn by Sovann Machhaand attendants or soldiers.

Lowest-rank females commonly wear a kbang (also kbaing na), a diadem. Brahmin characters with hair buns inside an ornament may also wear a kbang.

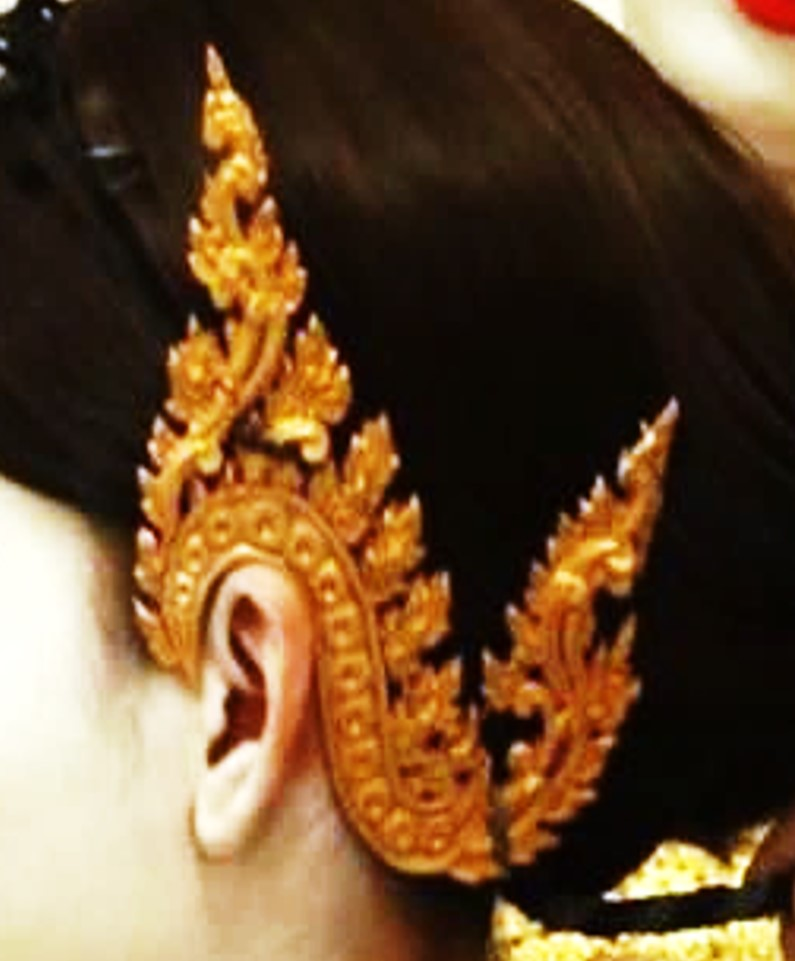
Khmer chor trajeak or jor trachiek (ear ornament).

The apsara crown is taken directly from numerous carvings and sculptures at Angkor.

Some wear ear ornaments called chor trajeak or jor trachiek ជរត្រចៀក ("ear ornament").

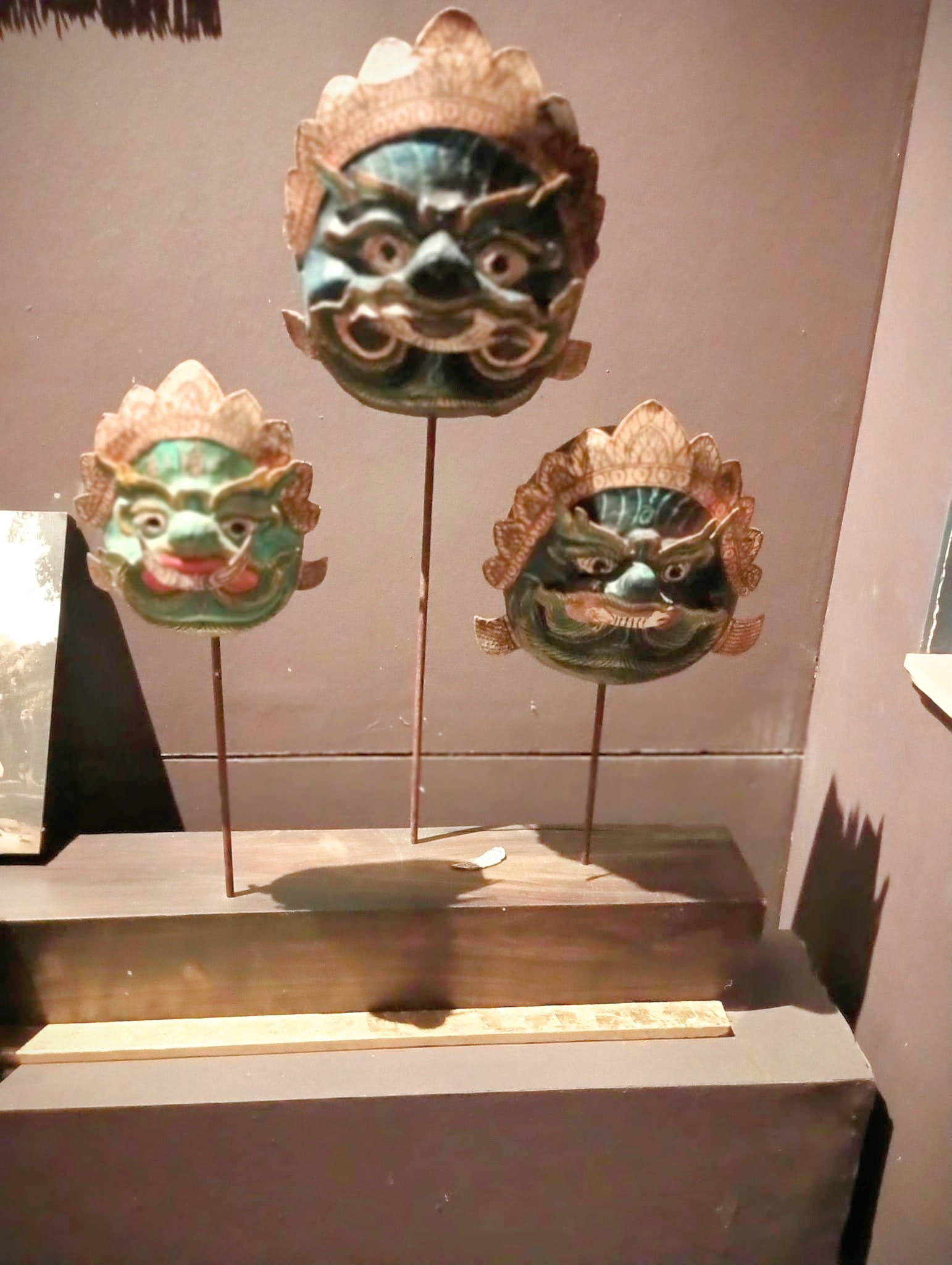
Khmer yakkha masks.

Monkeys and yaks of royalty wear masks with attached mokots. There are no masks on feminine characters. Garuda - King of the Birds, some animals, the eysei, and Preah Sang as the ngo, wear masks. Yakkha and monkey masks exceed the size of the head, and bear wings on each side. Monkey bear extended jaws, and yakkha masks have large mouths with fangs. Rab's mask and attached mokot with nine carved faces is the most valuable owing to his high position.

=== Floral adornments ===
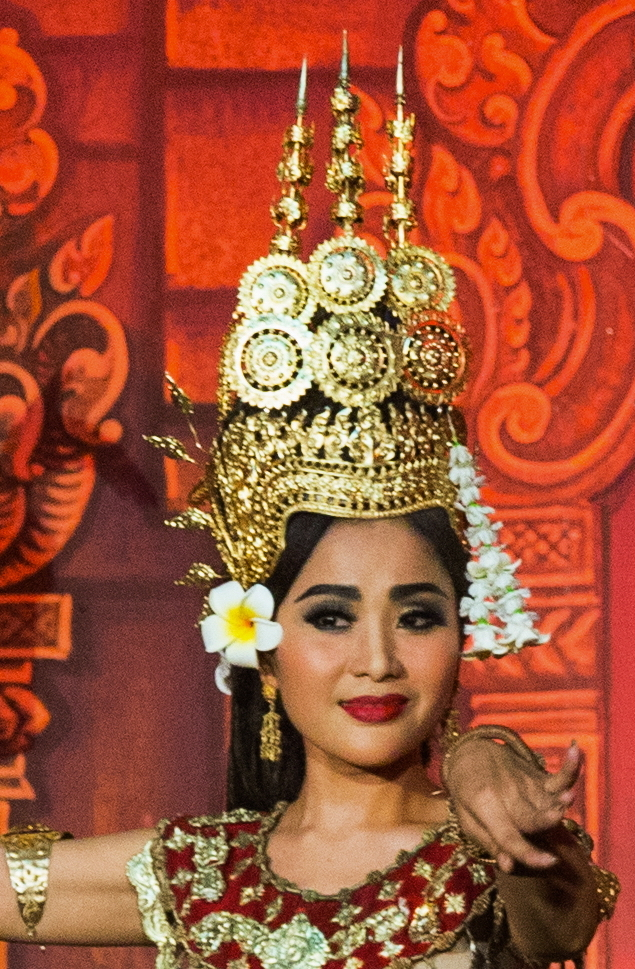
Lead apsara with floral adornments.

Dancers traditionally wear fragrant flowers that are prepared day and then removed from water and attached for a performance. Although sometimes fresh flowers are substituted with faux flowers.

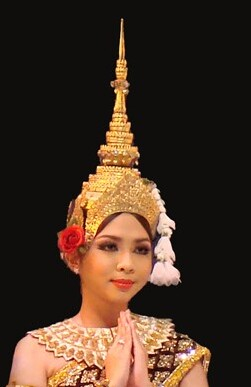
Neang (female) with floral adornments.

The neang (female) wears a rose, or another big flower, on the right, above the ear. Plumeria obtusa or Plumeria rubra (a white variety) flower, called champei in Khmer, hangs from jasmine on the left side of themokot. For the neay rong (male) role, it's the reverse.

An apsara also wears the tassel attached to the left' and a champei on the right. Champeis may cascade down the back of her hair.

Yakkha may wear a flower above their right ear.

Dancers may wear jasmine garlands on their wrists.

== Repertoire ==
According to The Cambridge Guide to Asian Theatre (1997), the Royal Ballet's repertoire contained approximately 40 dances and 60 dance dramas. Since the restoration of the Royal Ballet in the 1979, some of the old repertoire was recreated and several new dances were also created, most notably robam monosanhchettana by the late Chea Samy. As of recent years, new dance dramas have been created by the Royal Ballet, such as Apsara Mera. Sophiline Cheam Shapiro has also introduced new repertory to Khmer classical dance, although they are not part of the traditional royal repertoire and mainly have been performed in Western venues. Her works include dramas such as Samritechak, an adaptation of Shakespeare's Othello and Pamina Devi, an adaptation of Mozart's The Magic Flute.

=== Dance dramas ===
The repertoire of dance dramas (រឿង, roeung) consists of a myriad of stories, unlike the lakhon khol, which is limited only to the Ramayana. Many of the dance dramas have analogs in the lakhon nai dance genre of Thailand but do not share the same choreography or exact storyline. During the time of Queen Kossamak, several dance dramas were re-choreographed and shortened such as Roeung Preah Thong-Neang Neak; this drama, among others, would be recreated in 2003.

The plots of many dance dramas often concern a male character who rescues a damsel in distress or destined love presented with obstacles. The traditional repertoire portrays mythology or traditional tales and may sometimes include religious concepts such as karma.

A dance of tribute used in a dance drama titled Preah Ket Mealea, circa 1965

==== Select repertory of dance dramas ====
- Reamker (Ramakerti, រាមកេរ្តិ៍): Ramayana
- Preah Sothon-Neang Monorea (ព្រះសូធន-នាងមនោហ៍រា): Sudhana-Jataka, formerly referred to as Kailas (កៃលាស), recreated in 2003
- Krai Thong (ក្រៃថោង)
- Inao (ឥណាវ): Panji
- Kakey (កាកី): Kakati-Jataka
- Preah Anoruth-Neang Usa (ព្រះអនុរុទ្ធ-នាងឧសា): Aniruddha
- Sopheak Leak (សុភលក្ខណ៍): Chitralekha
- Preah Samot (ព្រះសមុទ្រ)
- Sovannahong (សុវណ្ណហង្ស)
- Preah Sang (ព្រះស័ង្ខ)

=== Dances ===
In contrast to the dance dramas are shorter dances known as robam. They can serve several purposes, such as honoring, ritualistic functions (e.g. securing the kingdom's fortune and prosperity), and blessing. Spanning several minutes or so, not all these dances have storylines, although many robam are indeed excerpts from dance dramas such as robam mekhala-reamso and robam sovan macchha (the latter being from the Reamker).

The 'apsara dance' of today was created under the guidance of Queen Kossamak Nearireath. Its costume is based on the bas-relief of apsaras on temple ruins but much of it, including its music and gesture, is not unique from other classical Khmer dances that probably do not date back to the Angkor period.

==== Select repertory of dances ====
- Robam Apsara (របាំអប្សរា)
- Robam Tep Monorom (របាំទេពមនោរម្យ)
- Robam Chun Por (របាំជូនពរ)
- Robam Makar (របាំមករ)
- Robam Sovann Maccha (របាំសុវណ្ណមច្ឆា)
- Robam Moni Mekhala or Mekhala-Reamesor (របាំមណីមេខលា)

== Glossary ==
kbach (ក្បាច)
(lit., "style" or "motif") referring to a pose or gesture used in Khmer classical dance
lakhon (ល្ខោន)
(lit., "theatre"; also romanized as lakhaon and lkhaon), referring to different genres of theatrical performances
lakhon preah reach trop (ល្ខោនព្រះរាជទ្រព្យ)
(lit., "theatre of royal wealth") the Khmer name for the main classical dance drama of Cambodia; the royal ballet of Cambodia, in this case, the term lakhon may be substituted with robam
robam (របាំ)
(lit., "dance"), a term used to refer to dances and in some contexts, all classical dances
robam kbach boran (របាំក្បាច់បូរាណ)
(lit., "dance of the ancient style") a term referring to classical dance that is used in the genres of theatre including lakhon khol, lakhon pol srey, and lakhon preah reach trop. Not to be confused with the term devised in the Lon Nol era.
roeung (រឿង)
(lit., "story"); referring to dance dramas
yeak (យក្ខ)
yaksha; a class of characters representing asuras and ogres, commonly translated as "giants"

== Media ==
=== Gallery ===
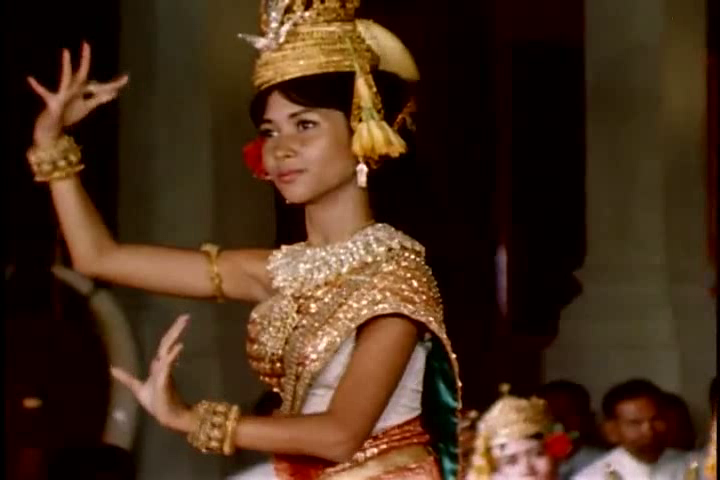
Princess Buppha Devi performs a dance in Cambodian Royal Palace.

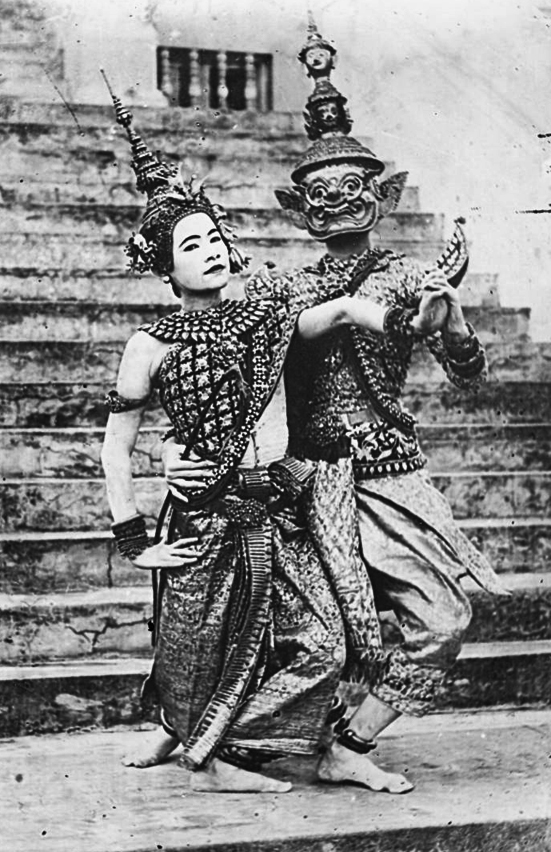
Sita and Ravana performs in a scene of Reamker dance drama.

External images
- Two dancers perform as a garuda and kinnari couple. (1928)
- A pair of dancers sit on a krae. (1931)
- Ravana with Sita in his captive. (1928)
- A dancer sits on the krae above two servants. (1928)
- A dance of propitiation depicting the sea goddess Manimekhala. (2006)
- Dancers perform for King Sihamoni's coronation. (2004)

=== Non-fiction ===
- Cravath, Paul (2008). Earth in Flower - The Divine Mystery of the Cambodian Dance Drama, DatAsia Press
- Groslier, George et al. (2011). Cambodian Dancers - Ancient and Modern, DatAsia Press
- Heywood, Denise (2009). Cambodian Dance Celebration of the Gods, River Books
- Loviny, Christophe (2003). The Apsaras of Angkor, Sipar: Jazz Editions

=== Fiction ===
- Meyer, Charles (2009). Saramani: Cambodian Dance, DatAsia Press
- Lee, Jeanne M. (1994). Silent Lotus, Farrar, Straus and Giroux
- Lord, Michael (2006). Little Sap and Monsieur Rodin, Lee & Low Books

=== Selected discography ===
- Musical Sources – Royal Music Of Cambodia (1971) by Jacques Brunet; contains a condensed recording of the Buong Suong dance drama featuring the goddess Manimekhala
- Homrong: Classical Music From Cambodia (2004) by Chum Ngek; contains music pieces and suites used by the royal ballet

== See also ==
- Theatre of Cambodia
- Dance in Cambodia
- Robam Apsara
- Robam Moni Mekhala
- Robam Sovann Maccha
- Dance in Thailand
- Earth in Flower
- Khmer shadow theatre
- Khon
- UNESCO Intangible Cultural Heritage Lists
