= Bavi =

Bavi may refer to:

- Bavi County, an administrative subdivision of Iran
- Karim Bavi, footballer
- Tropical Storm Bavi (disambiguation), multiple storms
- Bounty Agro Ventures, Inc., a Philippine poultry company
