= List of storms named Mekkhala =

The name Mekkhala (Thai: เมขลา, pronounced [mêːk.kʰā.lǎː]) has been used for five tropical cyclones in the western North Pacific Ocean. This name was originally spelled Megkhla by the WMO before an orthographic update in 2002. The name was contributed by Thailand and refers to Manimekhala, a guardian-angel of the seas in Southeast Asian myths, in Thai.

- Tropical Storm Mekkhala (2002) (T0220, 24W) – struck Hainan Island.
- Tropical Storm Mekkhala (2008) (T0816, 20W) – affected southern China.
- Severe Tropical Storm Mekkhala (2015) (T1501, 01W, Amang) – category 1 typhoon that struck the Philippines.
- Severe Tropical Storm Mekkhala (2020) (T2006, 07W, Ferdie) – category 1 typhoon that struck Fujian, China.
- Typhoon Mekkhala (2026) (T2607, 07W, Francisco) – a strong category 4 typhoon that recurved to Japan after affecting the Philippines and Taiwan

Preceded by Jangmi	Pacific typhoon season names Mekkhala	Succeeded by Higos
