= Tropical Storm Mekkhala (2020) =

Pacific severe tropical storm in 2020

Severe Tropical Storm Mekkhala (Ferdie)
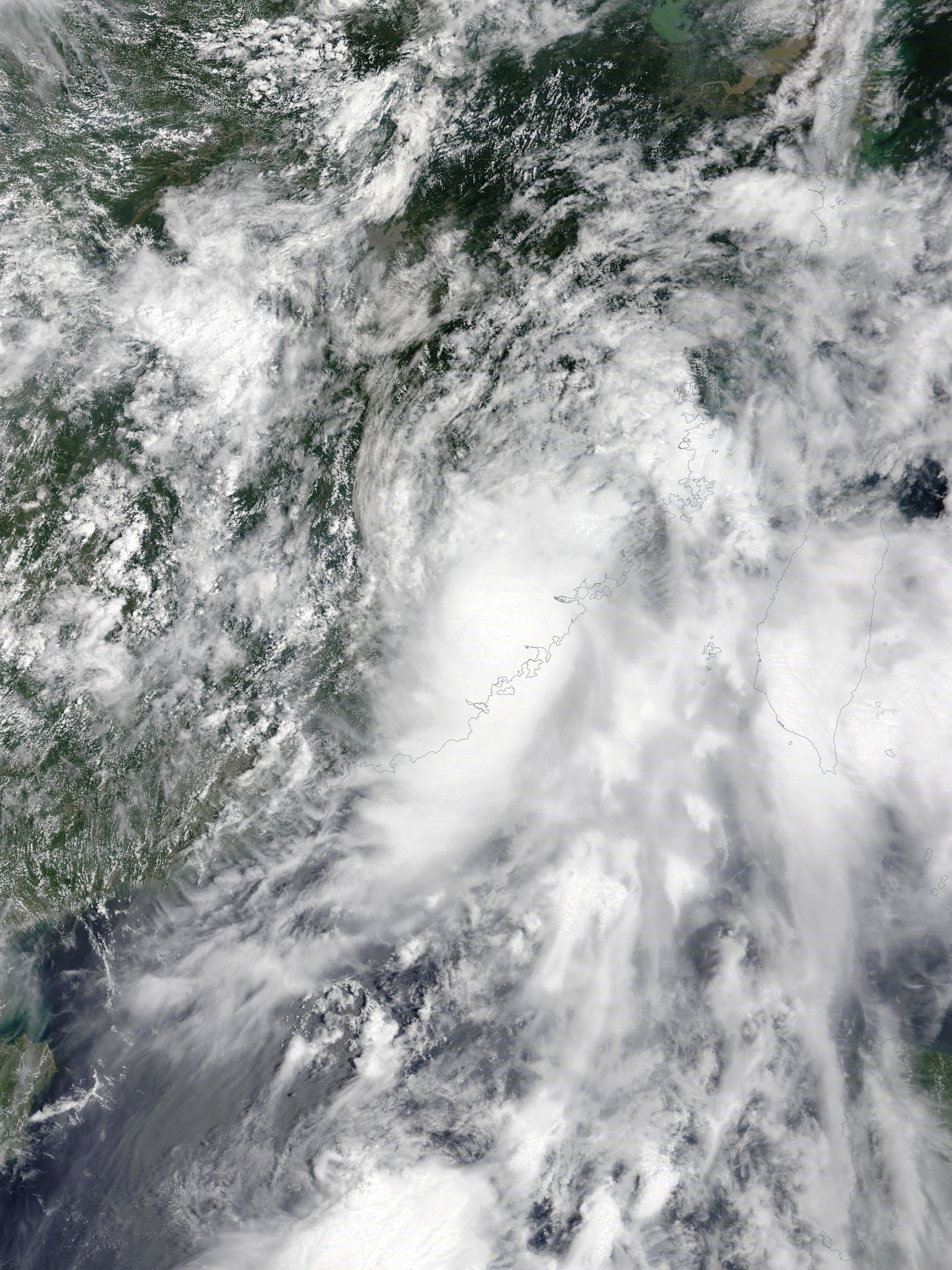
- Severe Tropical Storm Mekkhala over China on August 11

Meteorological history
- Formed: August 9, 2020
- Dissipated: August 11, 2020

Severe tropical storm
- 10-minute sustained (JMA)
- Highest winds: 95 km/h (60 mph)
- Lowest pressure: 992 hPa (mbar); 29.29 inHg

Category 1-equivalent typhoon
- 1-minute sustained (SSHWS/JTWC)
- Highest winds: 130 km/h (80 mph)
- Lowest pressure: 980 hPa (mbar); 28.94 inHg

Overall effects
- Fatalities: None reported
- Damage: $159 million (2020 USD)
- Areas affected: Philippines, Taiwan, East China
- IBTrACS
- Part of the 2020 Pacific typhoon season

Severe Tropical Storm Mekkhala, (Note: The name Mekkhala (Thai: เมขลา, [meːk˥˩ kʰa˧ laː˩˩˦]) was contributed by Thailand and refers to Manimekhala, a guardian-angel of the seas, in Thai.) known in the Philippines as Tropical Storm Ferdie, was a severe tropical storm that affected China in early August 2020 causing 1.1 billion yuan (US$159 million) in damage. However, no fatalities had been reported.

== Meteorological history ==
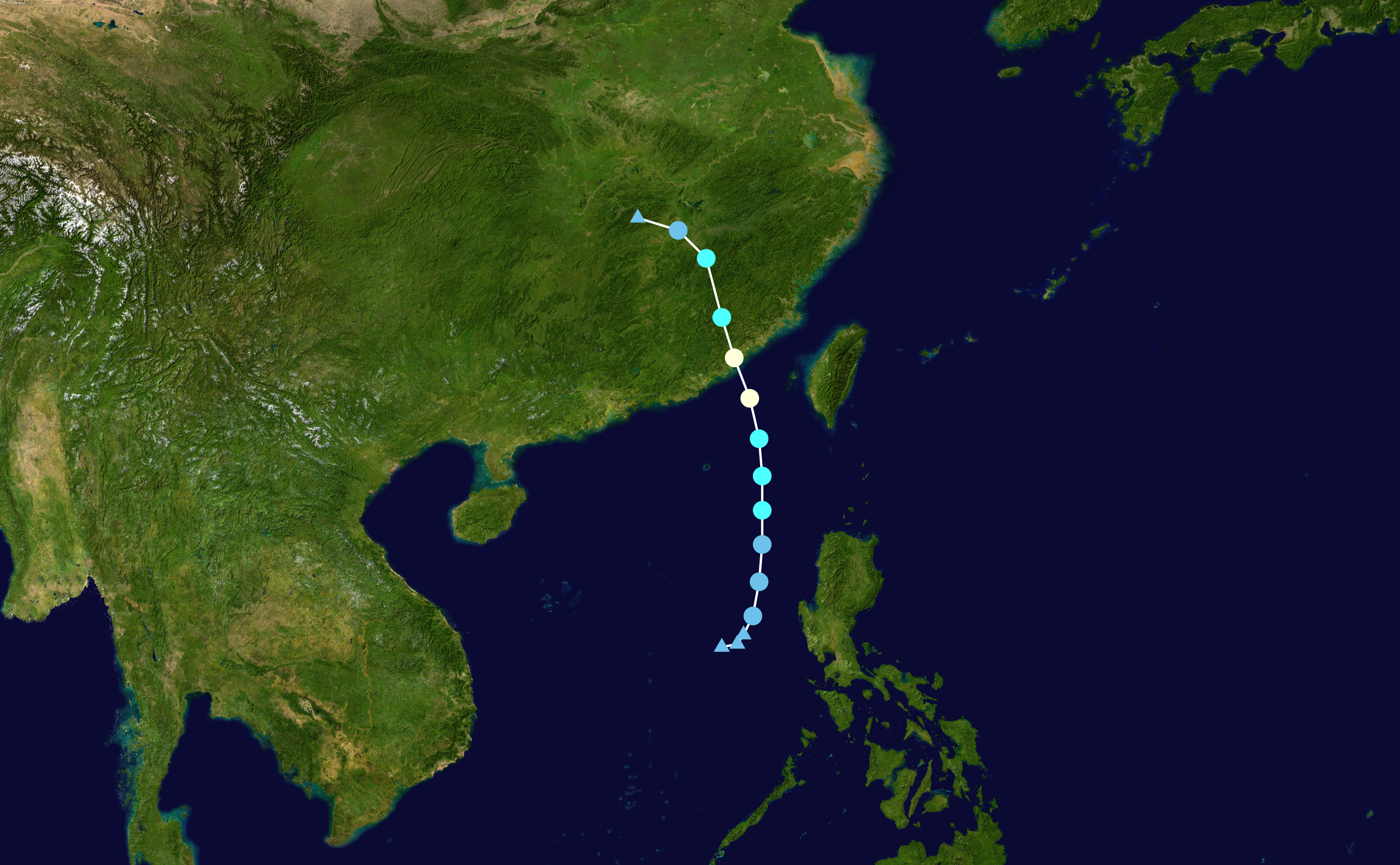
Map plotting the storm's track and intensity, according to the Saffir–Simpson scale Map key Saffir–Simpson scale Tropical depression (≤38 mph, ≤62 km/h) Tropical storm (39–73 mph, 63–118 km/h) Category 1 (74–95 mph, 119–153 km/h) Category 2 (96–110 mph, 154–177 km/h) Category 3 (111–129 mph, 178–208 km/h) Category 4 (130–156 mph, 209–251 km/h) Category 5 (≥157 mph, ≥252 km/h) Unknown Storm type Tropical cyclone Subtropical cyclone Extratropical cyclone, remnant low, tropical disturbance, or monsoon depression

An area of persistent convection formed within the proximity of a through that would spawn Tropical Storm Jangmi on August 7, west of Luzon. As Jangmi became the dominant system in the area, this low-pressure area remained disorganized. However, on the next day, as Jangmi moved away from the area, the system began to organize, and on August 9, the JTWC upgraded the storm to a Tropical Depression. Soon after, at 8:00 p.m. PST, the PAGASA followed and upgraded the storm and gave it the name Ferdie. By the next day, the JTWC upgraded Ferdie into a tropical storm. PAGASA then issued its last warning as Ferdie exited the Philippine Area of Responsibility. Then soon, the JMA followed suit and upgraded Ferdie to a tropical storm, giving it the international name Mekkhala. At 07:30 CST on August 11 (23:30 UTC on August 10), Mekkhala made landfall at Zhangpu County in Fujian, China shortly after peak intensity.

== Preparations and impact ==
=== Philippines and Taiwan ===
Mekkhala forced a Signal No. 1 warning to be placed for the Ilocos region in the Philippines, as it brought monsoonal conditions to portions of Luzon, shortly after its formation.

Although, Mekkhala remain well to the west of Taiwan, the storm still brought rounds of heavy rainfall to the island.

=== China ===
In preparation for Mekkhala, officials in China suspended ferry services and forced ships back to port. The China Meteorological Administration issued a Level III emergency response, while flood control workers were sent to areas hit by Mekkhala. Train services and hundreds of flights were cancelled as Mekkhala neared. The Xiamen Flood Control reported that 3,200 people evacuated ahead of the storm. Mekkhala caused heavy precipitation amounts over China up to 7.847 inches (200 mm) in some areas. In Zhangpu County, Fujian, roofs of wooden homes were torn off at a tourism site where 30 people were sheltering. In Zhangzhou, damage from Mekkhala totaled to 1.1 billion yuan (US$159 million), where vehicles were forced to shelter along highways due to strong winds. Another highway in the region was blocked by a tree forcing two police officers to direct traffic away from the tree.

== See also ==
- Weather of 2020
- Tropical cyclones in 2020
- Other tropical cyclones named Mekkhala
- Tropical Storm Meranti (2010) - had similar track and intensity with Mekkhala
