= Manimekhala =

Goddess of the seas

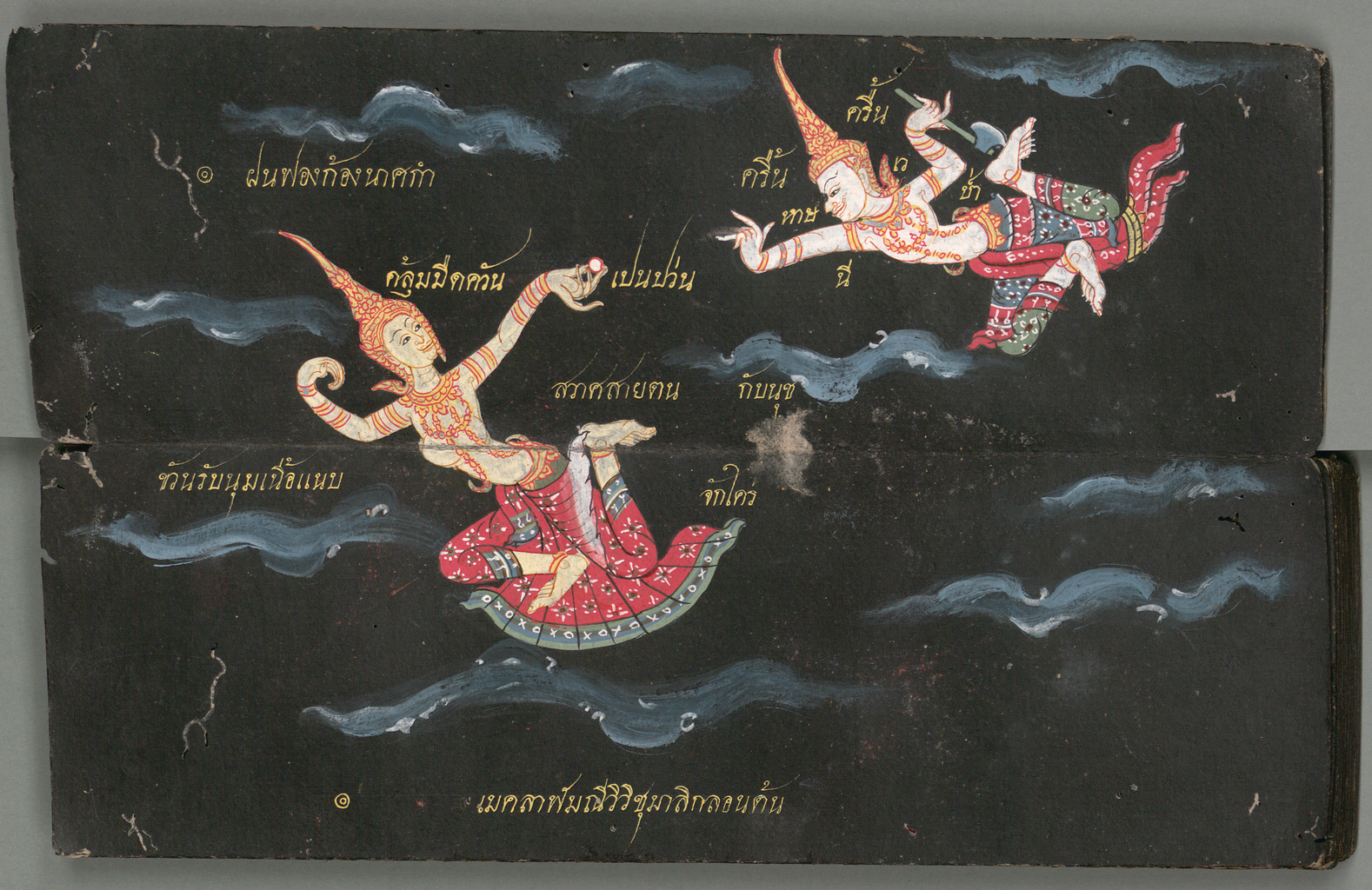
Illustrated of Mekhala and Ramasura, from a samut khoi of Thai poetry in the second half of the 19th century. Now in the collection of Bavarian State Library, Germany.

Manimekhala (Pali: Maṇīmekhalā) is a goddess in the Buddhist mythology. She is regarded as a guardian of the seas, namely the Indian Ocean and the South China Sea as part of the mythology of Southeast Asia. She was placed by Cātummahārājika to protect virtuous beings from shipwreck. She appears in several Buddhist stories including the Mahanipata Jataka (Mahajanaka Jataka), in which she rescues Prince Mahajanaka from a shipwreck.

== Etymology ==
In Pali, maṇīmekhalā refers to a girdle or belt of jewels. In Southeast Asia, she is known by various indigenized appellations, including as Mani Maykhala (မဏိမေခလာ) in Burmese, as Moni Mekhala (មណីមេខលា) or Neang Mekhala (នាងមេខលា) in Khmer; as Mani Mekkhala (มณีเมขลา) in Thai.

== In Mainland Southeast Asia ==
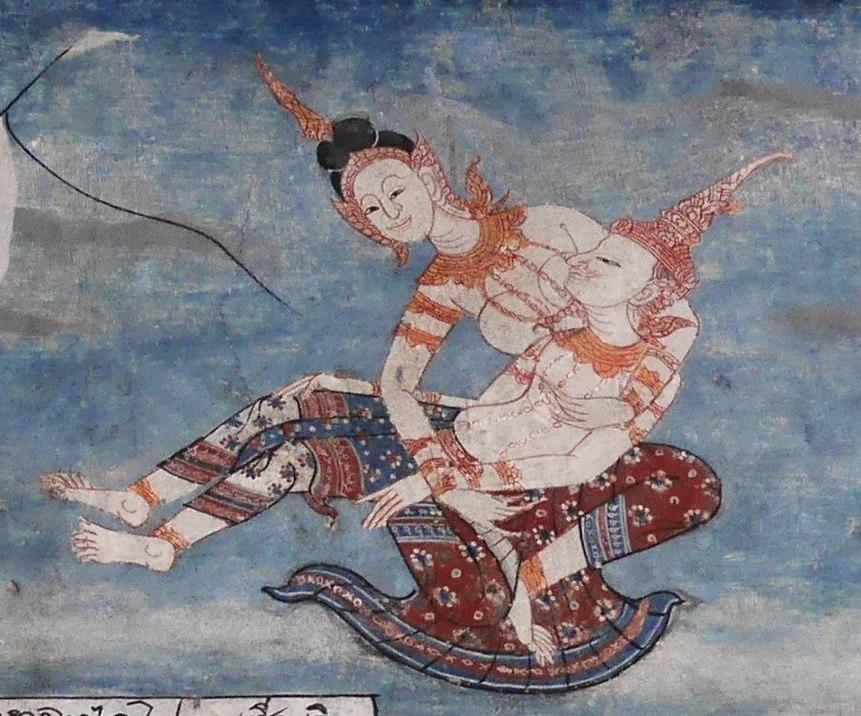
Manimekhala in Mahajanaka.

Archaeological evidence of Manimekhala in the form of reliefs has been found in Zothoke, Myanmar (near Bilin), dating to the first millennium AD.

Manimekhala is seen in wat paintings across Mainland Southeast Asia depicting scenes from the Mahajanaka. In Thailand and Cambodia, she is considered a goddess of lightning and the seas.

=== Manimekhala and Ramasura ===
The story of Manimekhala and Ramasura is mentioned many times in the classical literature of Cambodia and Thailand. It depicts Manimekhala along with Ramasura (usually considered a depiction of Parashurama) and Arjuna. According to legend, the phenomena of lightning and thunder is produced from the flashing of Manimekhala's crystal ball and the sound of Ramasura's axe as he pursues her through the skies.

== In India and Sri Lanka ==
In Tamil Nadu, India and Sri Lanka, Manimekalai is considered to be the sea goddess.

In the Tamil Buddhist epic poem, the Manimekalai, she puts the eponymous heroine to sleep and takes her to the island Maṇipallavam (Nainatheevu), who later becomes a Buddhist nun.

In the mythic cycle of the god Devol, when he approaches Sri Lanka and his ship founders, it is Manimekhalai, on the instructions of the god Śakra, who conjures up a stone boat to save him.

== Dance ==
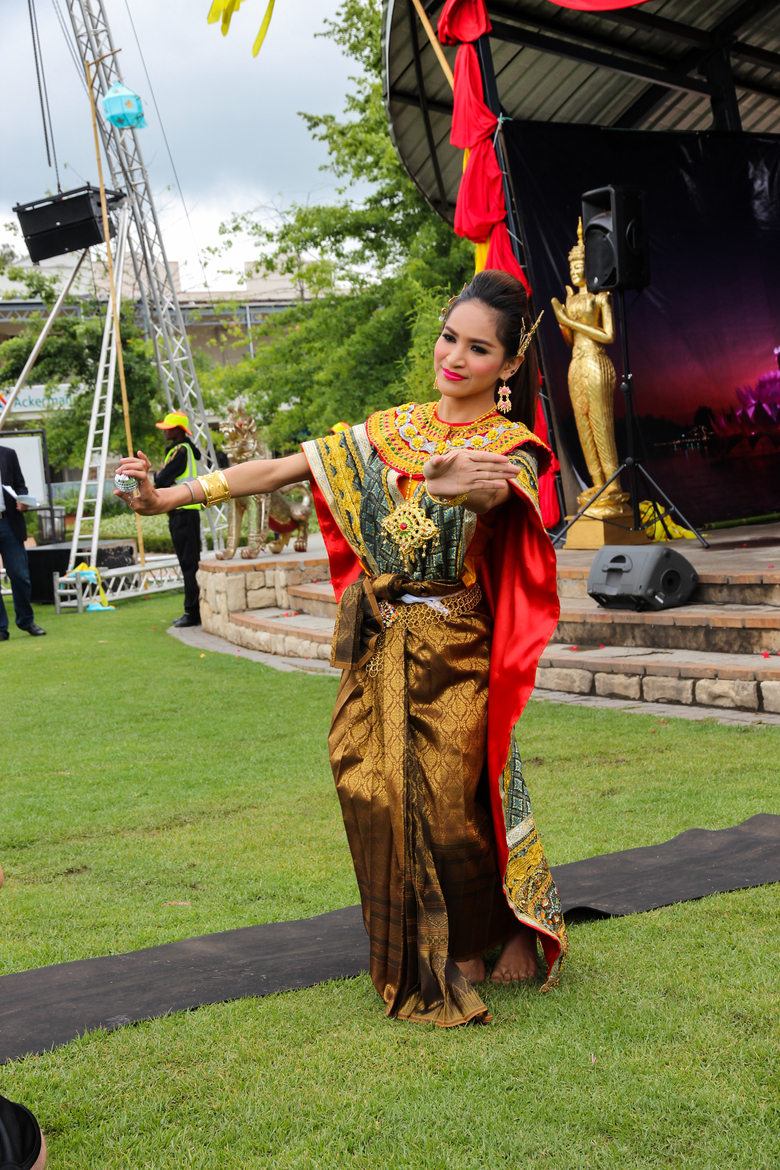
Mekkhala dance in Thai style.

In the classical dance traditions of Thailand and Cambodia, sacred dramatic dances depict the story of Manimekhala and Ramasura.

=== Cambodia ===
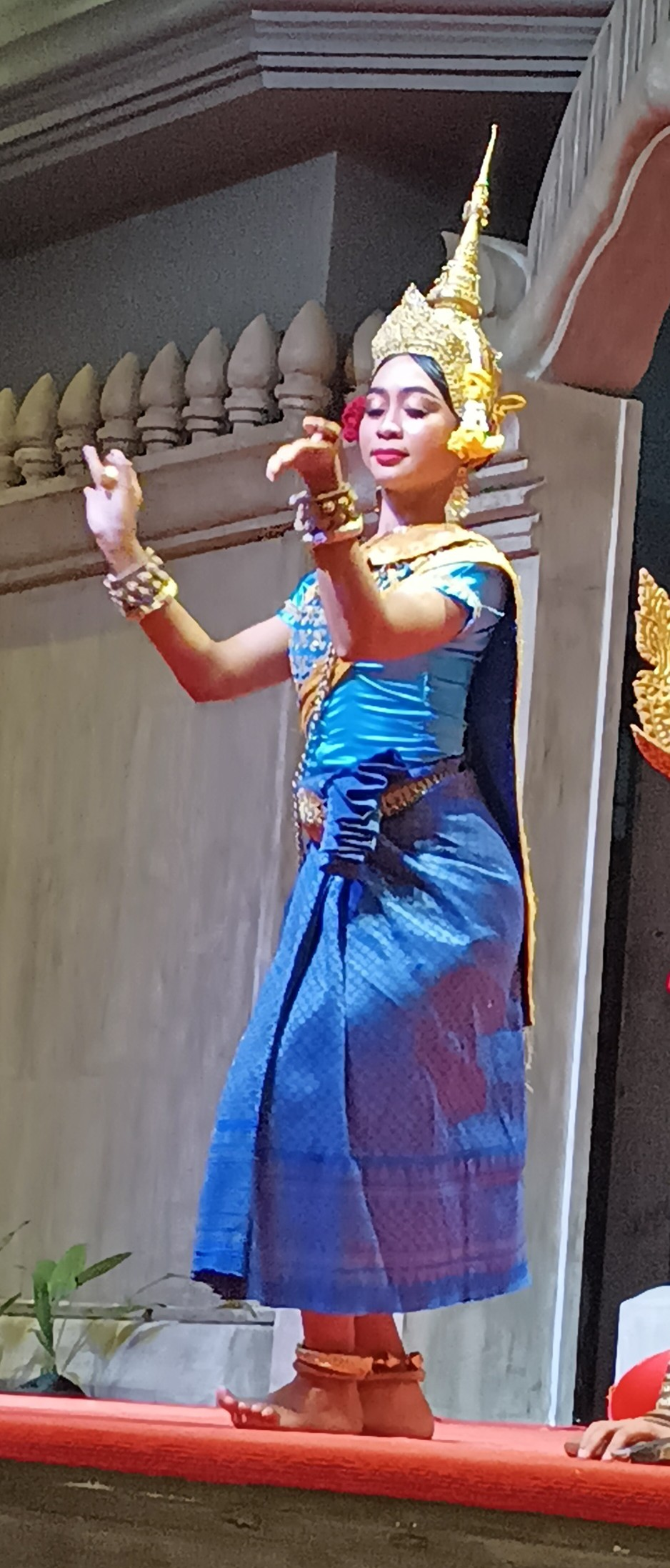
Moni Mekhala in Khmer ballet.

Robam Moni Mekhala (Khmer: របាំមណីមេខលា, also known as Robam Mekhala Ream Eysor) is a Khmer classical dance that portrays the story of Moni Mekhala and Ream Eyso. It is part of the buong suong dance suite that is among the most sacred of Khmer classical dances, serving a ceremonial purpose to invoke rain upon the land.

=== Thailand ===
In Thailand, the Mekkhala–Ramasun dance was performed as a boek rong ('prelude dance') introduction before main performances of lakhon nai or khon dances.

== In modern usage ==
- The popular Burmese pop singer May Kha Lar derives her stage name from Manimekhala.
- Thailand has contributed her name to be used as a typhoon name, spelled as Mekkhala. It has been used in 2002, 2008, 2015, 2020, and 2026.
- Also, one award given to the television industry in Thailand since 1980 is called the Mekkhala Award.

== See also ==
- Jataka tales, from Khuddaka Nikāya
- Mazu, Chinese Goddess of Sea
- Nyai Roro Kidul, Queen of Southern Sea worshipped by Javanese and Sundanese in Indonesia
