= Robam Moni Mekhala =

Traditional Cambodian dance

Robam Moni Mekhala របាំមណីមេខលា
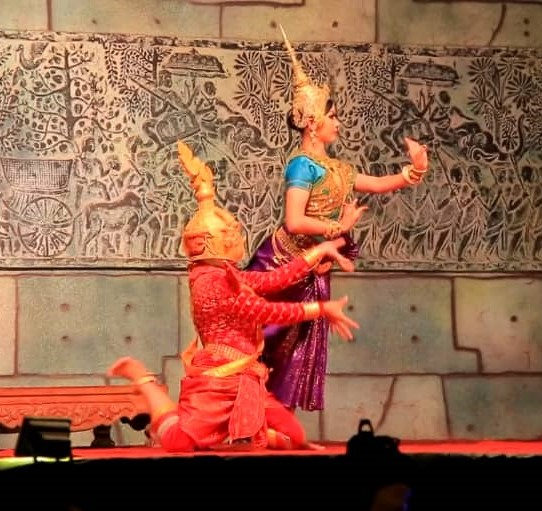
- Genre: Royal Ballet of Cambodia
- Instrument: Pinpeat Orchestra
- Origin: Cambodia

Robam Moni Mekhala (Khmer: របាំមណីមេខលា, Moni Mekhala Dance) sometimes known as Robam Moni Mekhala and Reamso (Khmer: របាំមណីមេខលា និង រាមសូរ) is a traditional Cambodian dance. It is a rain dance that explores the Cambodian myth of thunder, lightning, and rain associated with Buddhist mythology. Most of the time, this dance depicts the fight between Reamesor and Moni Mekhala where Reamso (Ramasura/ Parashurama) attempts to seize the magical crystal ball from Moni Mekhala and this fighting creates a storm.

== Overview ==
An early record of dance (Khmer: robam/ rabam) is from the 7th century, where the performance was used as a funeral rite for kings. During the Angkor period, dance was ritually performed at temples. The story of Moni Mekhala and Reamso appears frequently in ritual and Cambodian classical dance. This dance is commonly performed at the New Year's buong suong (propitiation) ritual, marking the beginning of the spring planting cycle.

== Story ==
The dance narrates the Cambodian myth of rain, thunder, and lightning, which is created from the fight between the strong ugly demon male, Reamso (wearing a long-sleeved shirt), and the beautiful female goddess, Moni Mekhala (wearing a short-sleeved shirt), for the control of the magical crystal ball owned by Moni Mekhala.

According to Cambodian legend, a princely manifestation of the earth, Vorachhun, a goddess of the seas, Moni Mekhala, and Reamso (the storm demon) all studied with the hermit known as Lok Ta Moni Eisei. A wise and powerful hermit possessed a magical crystal ball and must decide to which pupil the crystal ball should be given. He proposed a challenge: the students were told to collect a glass of morning dew and the first to present one would be the winner.

The following day, the three attempted to collect the morning dew. Among them, Moni Mekhala had the smartest method, spreading her handkerchief on the grass overnight which by morning was damp. She squeezed the dew into the glass and presented it to the hermit. As a reward for her ingenuity, Moni Mekhala was given a glittering crystal ball, while Reamso received a magic diamond axe and Vorachhun a magic dagger.

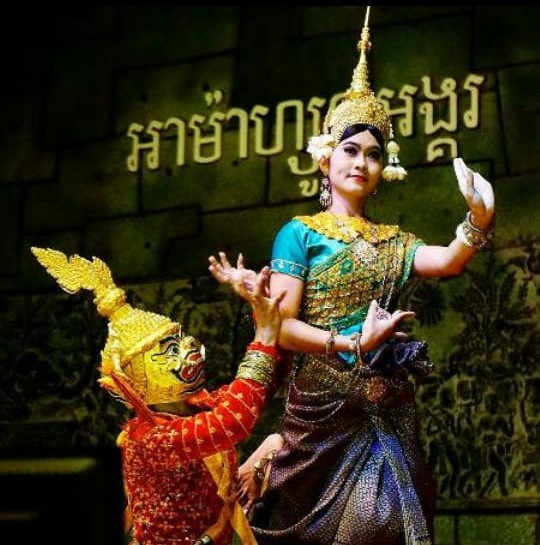
Mekhala vs Reamso

Jealous of Moni Mekhala, Reamso is determined to seize it at any cost. He plans to seize the crystal ball from Moni Mekhala. En-route to Moni Mekhala, Reamso met Voracchun and kills him. Then, he found Moni Mekhala, but she reacted with compassion instead of fear and evades Reamso. He kept attacking the goddess. However, Moni Mekhala bounces back and fights to defend herself. Reamso throws his axe at Moni Mekhala, producing thunder, but not on the targets, because Moni Mekhala manages to dodge. When the demon tries to grab the crystal ball, Moni Mekhala sends the crystal ball flying into the sky, producing flashes of lightning that temporarily blind Reamso. The goddess escapes into the sky. The friction produces nourishing rain, and the fight continues as the cycle of rain on the earth.Some of the rain droplets fall on Voracchun’s body, reviving him. And sets off to the sky in search of Moni Mekhala and, Reamso.

== Characters and costumes ==
The main characters of the dance are Moni Mekhala and Reamso. In most of the performances, these two characters play the main role in the dance. In some performances, especially the Royal Buong Suong, Moni Mekhala is performed with many pairs of devata characters.

The costumes worn by characters in Robam Moni Mekhala are similar to those of other traditional dances of the Royal Ballet of Cambodia.

=== Moni Mekhala ===
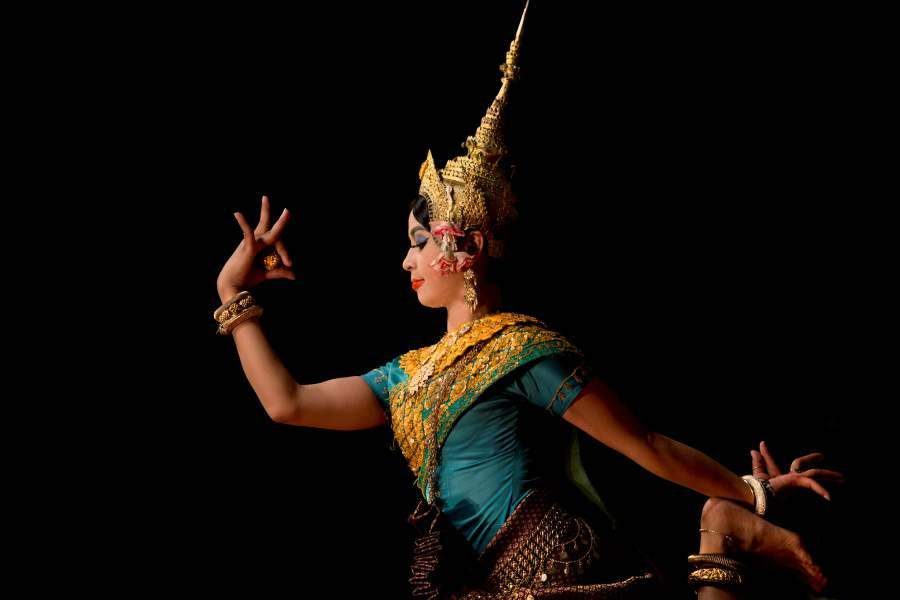
Moni Mekhala costume

The role of Moni Mekhala wears a decorative gold mokut ksatrei (crown), kbang (front crown), and chor trajeak (ears decoration jewelry) and adorned with flowers (lbak pkar) on both side of the crown. The character wears a sampot sarabap. The sari is wrapped around the lower body, then pleated into a band in the front and secured with a gold or brass belt. A shawl-like garment called a sbai is worn over the left shoulder diagonally. The sbai is very decorative and embroidered extensively with tiny beads and sequins. Similar to the sbai worn by other female characters in the Royal Ballet of Cambodia, the sbai worn by Moni Mekhala is designed with a diamond-shaped floral pattern, though a different pattern is sometimes used. Ksae sangvar, a decorated band of beads is worn crosswise. Under the sbai, Moni Mekhala wears a blue short-sleeved silk shirt called av lakoan that is tight at the sleeves, she wears it with the exposure of both her arms, elbows and hands that reveals her soft and fair skin to illustrate that she is a goddess of the sea or Moni Mekhala. Around the neck, an embroidered collar called a 'srang kar is worn. Jewelry for this role includes a large, filigree square pendant of which is hung by the corner, various types of ankle and wrists bracelets and bangles, an armlet or a kind of golden ornament worn by gripped around both ends sleeves of the short-sleeved shirt, and body chains of various styles. What distinguished Moni Mekhala from other female characters in Royal Ballet of Cambodia is that she wore the short-sleeved av lakoan (blue silk shirt) and holds a sacred magical crystal ball called keo moni.

=== Ream Eyso ===
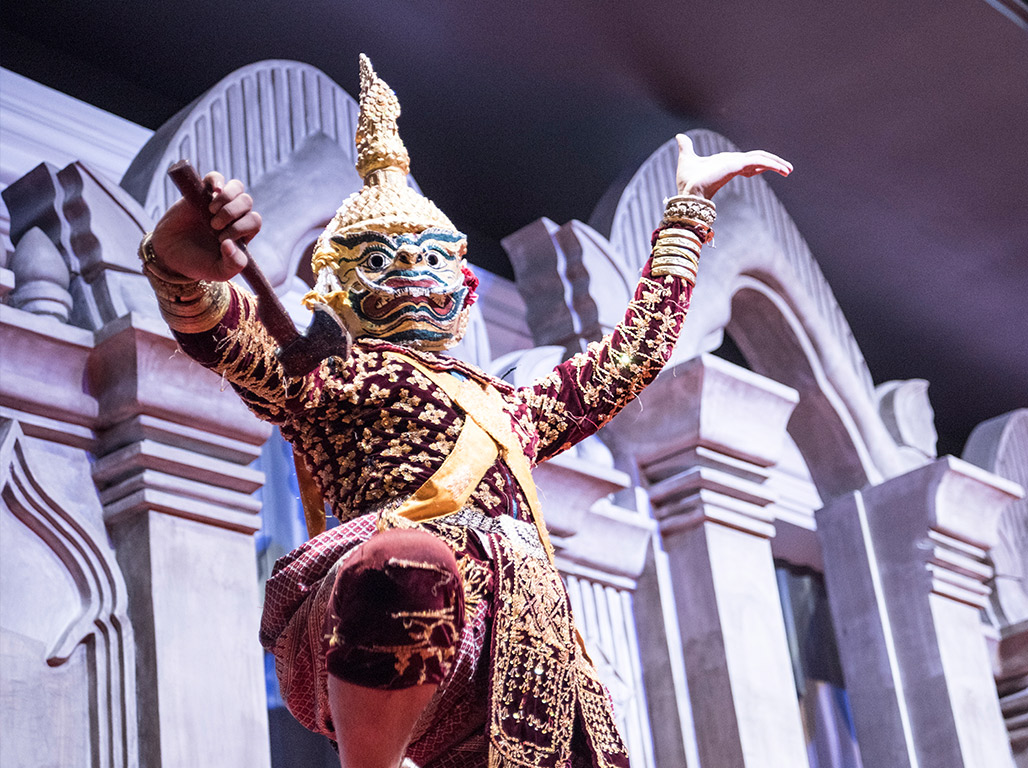
Ream Eyso costume

The Ream Eyso character wears a similar costume to the other yaksha (giant) characters in the Royal Ballet of Cambodia and Khol, however, there are distinctions in mask and weapon.

Like other yasksha's costumes, Ream Eyso's costumes require pieces, like sleeves, to be sewn together while being put on. The 'sampot' is worn in the 'chang kben' fashion, where the front is pleated and pulled under, between the legs, then tucked in the back and the remaining length of the pleat is stitched to the 'sampot' itself to form a draping 'fan' in the back. Knee-length pants are worn underneath, displaying a wide, embroidered hem around the knees.

Ream Eyso wears a long-sleeved shirt with rich embroidery along with a collar (srang kor) around the neck. On the end of the shoulders is a sort of epaulette that arches upwards like Indra's bow (known as inthanu). Other components of Ream Eyso's costumes are three richly embroidered banners worn around the front waist. The centrepiece is known as a 'robang muk' while the two side pieces are known as a 'cheay kraeng' with another piece in the back called a 'robang kraoy'.

The character also wears an X-like strap around the body called a 'sangvar'; it may be made of gold-colored silk or chains of gold with square ornaments. These characters also wear the same ankle and wrist jewellery as females, but with the addition of an extra set of bangles on the wrist and no armlets. A kite-shaped ornament called a 'sloek po' (named after the bo tree leaf), which serves as a centre point for their 'sangvar', is worn.

The distinction between Ream Eyso and other yaksha (giant) characters is that he possesses a magic axe and wears a decorative yaksha mask with a hamsa's tail crown.

== Music and song ==
The music used for most Khmer classical dance is the pinpeat, this music is also used to accompany the performance of Robam Moni Mekhala. This type of orchestra consists of several types of xylophones, drums, oboes, gongs, and other musical instruments.

Similar to other dances of Royal Ballet of Cambodia, the chorus for Robam Moni Mekhala is also consists of several singers who mainly sing in the absence of music. The lyrics are in poetry form and are sung interspersed with the grammatical particles eu [əː], eung [əːŋ], and euy [əːj] in various patterns.

== Performance ==
In propitiation ceremonies (បួងសួង, 'buong suong'), Robam Moni Mekhala along other dance pieces of the Royal Ballet of Cambodia was also performed at the Silver Pagoda and Throne Hall of the Royal Palace in 1960s. Nowadays, venues for performances by the Royal Ballet include the Royal University of Fine Art, the Chenla Theatre and the Chaktomuk Conference Hall.

Recently Robam Moni Mekhala was also performed in many occasions such as in the buong suong rituals in 2008 and 2019 in the Royal Palace and at the annual Bon Phum Festival. Robam Moni Mekhala along with other dance pieces were performed abroad as well.

== Role ==
Robam Moni Mekhala has been enacted for centuries and perform at least once a year in a sacred ceremony known as "boung suong" accompanied by Cambodian sacred music. During the rituals, dancers became a messengers between king and gods asking for rain, fertility, and the blessing for Cambodia and the well-being for the people.

== Moral ==
Researchers believe that this dance is centered on the independent woman who used her intelligence to resist Reamso, a male character. The dance also expresses the strength and fast reaction as the most demanding female role in Khmer classical dance.

== Cultural interpretation with nature ==
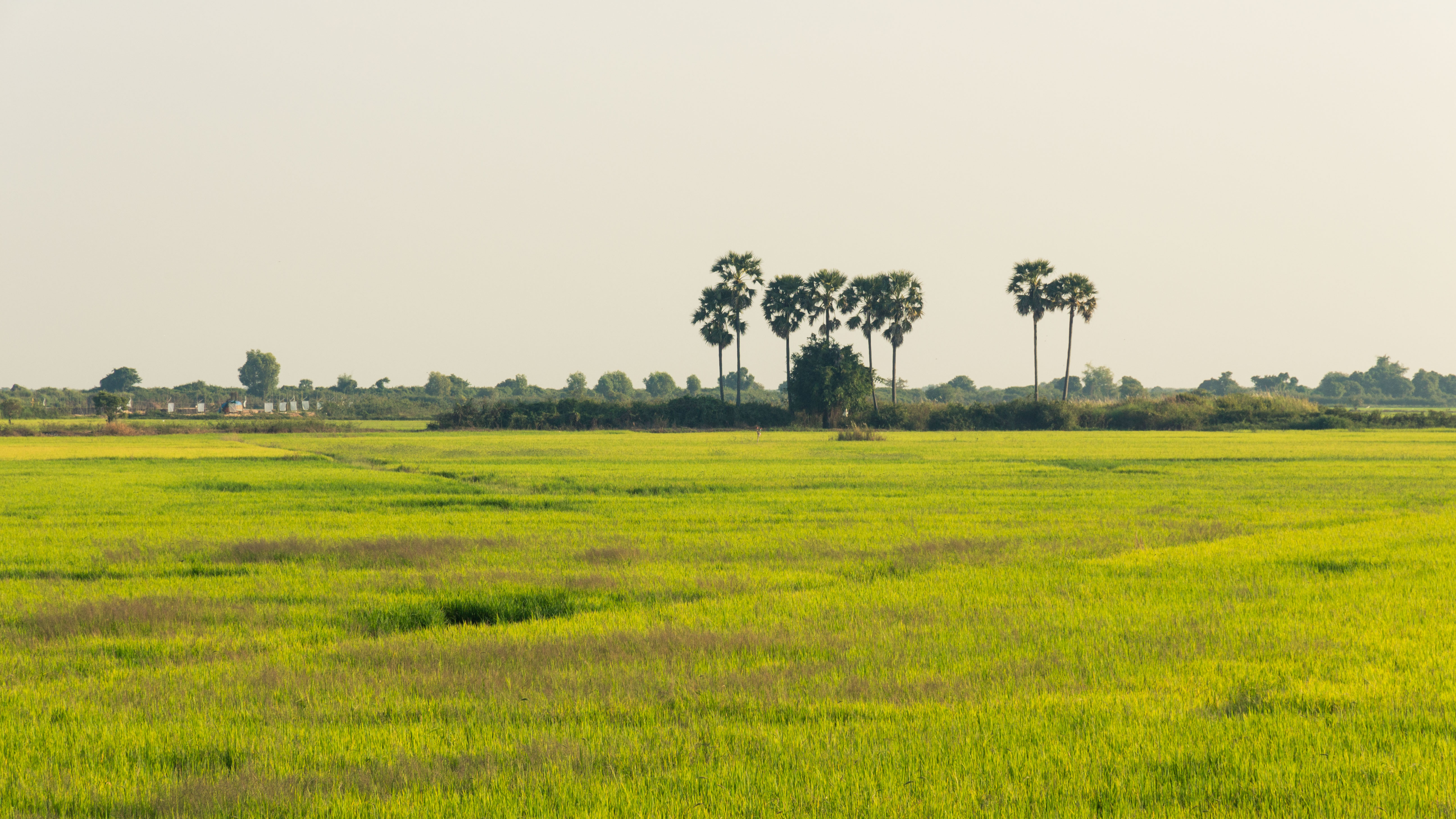
Cambodia's rice field during monsoon (raining season)

Cambodians see this legend as the origin of thunder, lightning, and rain. The fight between Moni Mekhala and Reamso believed to re-occur every year in mid-April around the time of Cambodian New Year. This period is at the height of the dry season just before the monsoon rains will fall and nourish the Cambodian farmland. The monsoon rains symbolizes a renewed life when the dried fields are flooded and fertilized. The dark clouds reminds the locals about the eternal battle between Reamso and Moni Mekhala and this represent the eternal raining cycle in Cambodia.

== See also ==
- Manimhekala
- Cambodian Classical Dance
- Robam Sovann Machha
