= Tropical Storm Mekkhala (2008) =

Pacific tropical storm in 2008

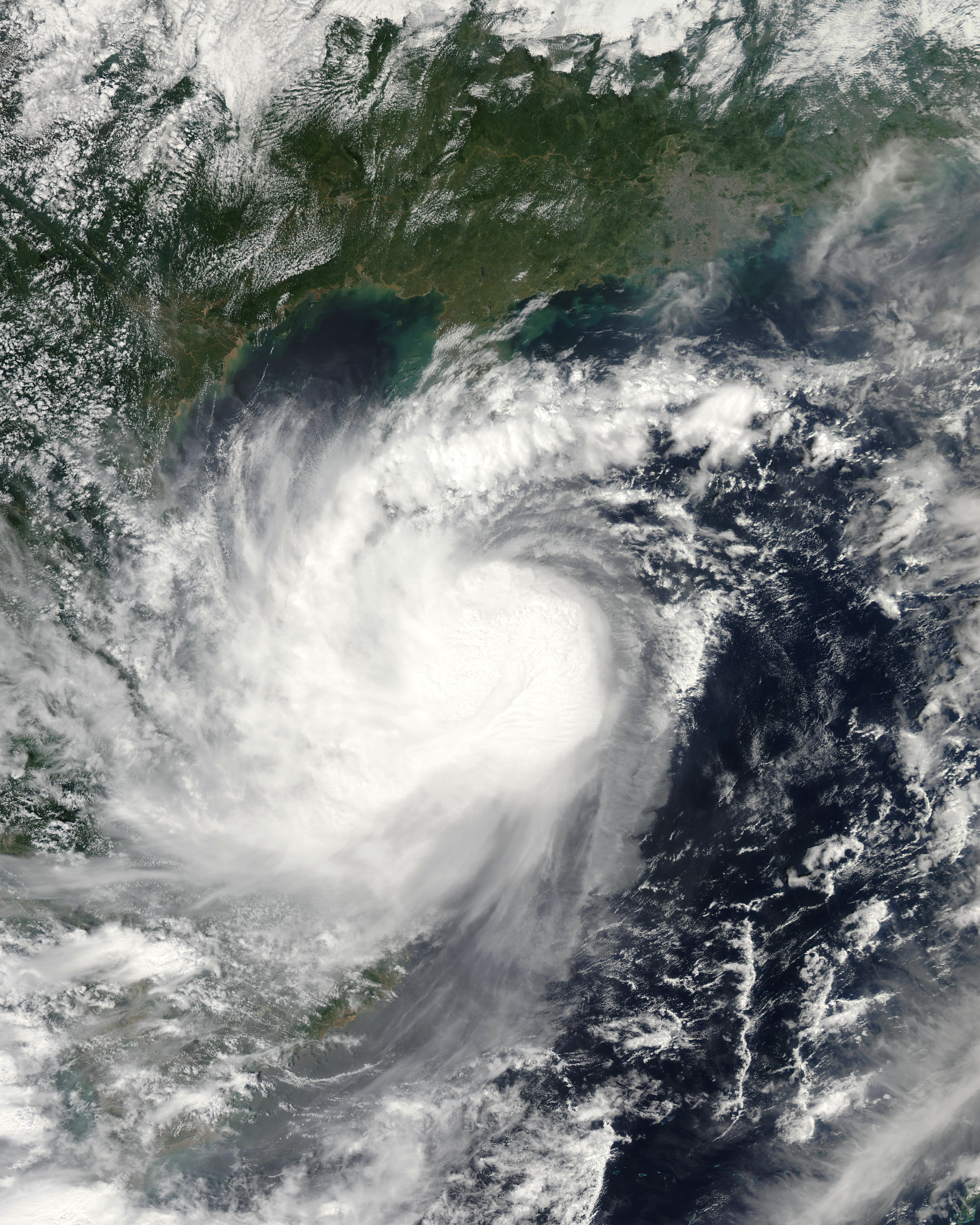
- Tropical Storm Mekkhala approaching Vietnam on September 29

Meteorological history
- Formed: September 27, 2008
- Dissipated: September 30, 2008

Tropical storm
- 10-minute sustained (JMA)
- Highest winds: 85 km/h (50 mph)
- Lowest pressure: 990 hPa (mbar); 29.23 inHg

Tropical storm
- 1-minute sustained (SSHWS/JTWC)
- Highest winds: 100 km/h (65 mph)
- Lowest pressure: 982 hPa (mbar); 29.00 inHg

Overall effects
- Fatalities: 16 direct
- Damage: $6.6 million (2008 USD)
- Areas affected: Vietnam, Laos, Thailand
- IBTrACS
- Part of the 2008 Pacific typhoon season

Tropical Storm Mekkhala (Note: The name Mekkhala (Thai: เมขลา, [meːk˥˩ kʰa˧ laː˩˩˦]) was contributed by Thailand and refers to Manimekhala, a guardian-angel of the seas, in Thai.) was recognised as the 16th Tropical Storm of the 2008 Pacific typhoon season by the Japan Meteorological Agency who are the Regional Specialized Meteorological Centre for the North Western Pacific Ocean. The Joint Typhoon Warning Center (JTWC) have also recognised Mekkhala as the 20th tropical depression, and the 18th tropical storm of the 2008 Pacific typhoon season.

On September 25 the Joint Typhoon Warning Center identified a tropical disturbance in the Gulf of Tonkin. On September 27 the Japan Metrological Agency, reported that the disturbance had become a tropical depression whilst the JTWC issued a Tropical Cyclone Formation Alert. During the next day the JTWC designated the depression as 20W. The JMA reported that the depression had intensified into Tropical Storm Mekkhala on September 29. Later that day the JTWC also upgraded the depression to Tropical Storm status. Early the next day the JMA reported that Mekkhala had intensified into a severe tropical storm. Later that day the JMA downgraded Mekkhala to a tropical storm and then both the JTWC and the JMA reported that Mekkhala had weakened into a tropical depression as they released their final advisories. Within their best track the JMA reported that Mekkhala had never reached severe tropical storm status.

== Meteorological history ==
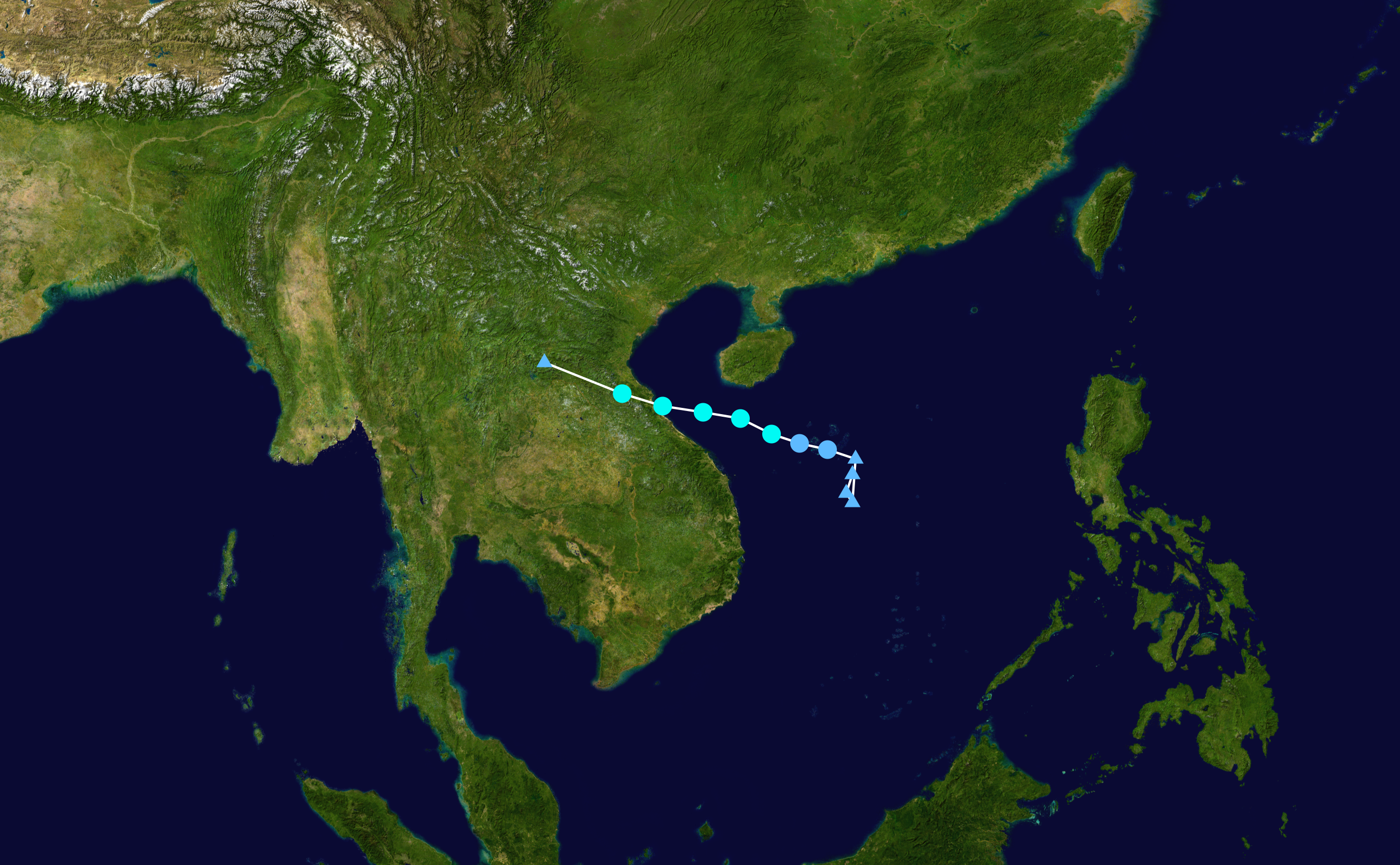
Map plotting the storm's track and intensity, according to the Saffir–Simpson scale Map key Saffir–Simpson scale Tropical depression (≤38 mph, ≤62 km/h) Tropical storm (39–73 mph, 63–118 km/h) Category 1 (74–95 mph, 119–153 km/h) Category 2 (96–110 mph, 154–177 km/h) Category 3 (111–129 mph, 178–208 km/h) Category 4 (130–156 mph, 209–251 km/h) Category 5 (≥157 mph, ≥252 km/h) Unknown Storm type Tropical cyclone Subtropical cyclone Extratropical cyclone, remnant low, tropical disturbance, or monsoon depression

A Tropical Disturbance formed to the south of China, within the Gulf of Tonkin on September 25, 2008. Early the next day the Joint Typhoon Warning Center assessed the disturbances chances of becoming a "significant tropical cyclone" within 24 hours as "Fair". However early on September 27 the JTWC reassessed the disturbances chances becoming a "significant tropical cyclone" as poor. Later that day the Japan Meteorological Agency then designated it as a weak tropical depression. Whilst early the next morning the JTWC upgraded the disturbances chances of becoming a "significant tropical cyclone" to good, and subsequently issued a Tropical Cyclone Formation Alert. Later that day the JMA started to issue full advisories on the tropical depression, as it was expected to become a tropical storm within the next 24 hours. The JTWC then designated the depression as Tropical Depression 20W as they issued their first warning on the depression. On September 29 the JMA upgraded the depression to a tropical storm and named the storm as Mekkhala. Later that morning the JTWC designated Mekkhala as a tropical storm.

Early the next day the JMA reported that Mekkhala had intensified into a severe tropical storm and reached its peak wind speeds of 50kts. However within their next advisory the JMA downgraded Mekkhala to a tropical storm as Mekkhala had made landfall on northern Vietnam during the previous three hours. During the morning of September 30, RSMC Tokyo downgraded Mekkhala to a tropical depression as they issued their final advisory. The Joint Typhoon Warning Center also issued their final advisory that morning as Mekkhalla was expected to weaken below their warning level of 25 kts (30 mph (48 km/h) and then dissipate later that day. Mekkhala then dissipated over Land later that day.

On November 17, 2008, the Japan Meteorological Agency released their Post Storm Analysis on Mekkhala. Within it they reassessed the peak wind speeds as 45 knots (52 mph; 83 km/h) which meant that Mekkhala was downgraded from a severe tropical storm to a tropical storm.

== Preparations and impact ==
Vietnam was affected by Tropical Storm Mekkhala less than a week after Typhoon Hagupit had affected the country. Despite this Mekkhala still caused $6.6 million (2008 US$) worth of damage. A total of 1,000 homes were washed away by the storm and an additional 10,000 were damaged. The storm was also responsible for Blackouts in Vietnam, as well as causing 16 deaths and 13 injuries. Vietnam's National Steering Committee for Storm and Flood Control also reported that Mekkhala had forced the evacuation of thousands of people and had sunk 38 fishing trawlers.

An estimated 3,050 hectares of crops were damaged in Thanh Hóa Province, leading to $1.2 million in losses. In Hà Tĩnh Province 500 homes and 4,000 hectares of crops were damaged and three people were killed. Damages in the province amounted to $1.8 million.

== See also ==
- Other tropical cyclones named Mekkhala
- Typhoon Betty (1987)
- Typhoon Wutip (2013)
- Tropical Storm Talas (2017)
- Tropical Storm Sonca (2017)
