= Mahānipāta Jātaka =

Buddhist collection of stories

Translations of Mahānipāta Jātaka
- English: The Ten Great Birth Stories of the Buddha
- Burmese: ဇာတ်တော်ကြီးဆယ်ဘွဲ့
- Khmer: ទសជាតក (Tousak Cheadok)
- Thai: ทศชาติชาดก (RTGS: Thotsachat Chadok)

The Mahānipāta Jātaka, sometimes translated as the Ten Great Birth Stories of the Buddha, are a set of stories from the Jātaka tales (in the Khuddaka Nikāya) describing the ten final lives of the Bodisattva who would finally be born as Siddhartha Gautama and eventually become Gautama Buddha. These jātaka tales revolve around Benares, the current Varanasi in India. The final ten are the best known of the total 547 jātaka tales. In Myanmar,Cambodia and Thailand, they are known as ဇာတ်ကြီးဆယ်ဘွဲ့, ទសជាតក and ทศชาติชาดก, respectively (dasajāti jātaka or the tales of the 10 rebirths). These render the 10 virtues of mankind, that the enlightenment would reveal. These respective virtues are: renunciation, vigour, benevolence, absolute determination, insight, morality, patience, equanimity, reality and generosity.

== Differences in the order of the stories ==
Classic sequence	Sequence in Dasajāti Jātaka
No.538: Mūga-Pakkha	No.1: Prince Temiya
No.539: Mahājanaka	No.2: Prince Mahajanaka
No.540: Suvanna Sāma	No.3: Prince Suvanna Sāma
No.541: Nimi	No.4: Prince Nemirāja
No.542: Khandahāla	No.7: Prince Canda Kumara
No.543: Bhūridatta	No.6: Prince Bhūridatta
No.544: Mahā Nārada	No.8: Lord Brahma Narada
No.545: Vidhura Pandita	No.9: Prince Vidhura Pandita
No.546: Mahā Ummagga	No.5: Prince Mahosatha
No.547: Vessantara	No.10: Prince Vessantara

== Synopses ==
=== 1. Prince Temiya (the crippled mute prince) - Act of renunciation (nekkhamma) ===
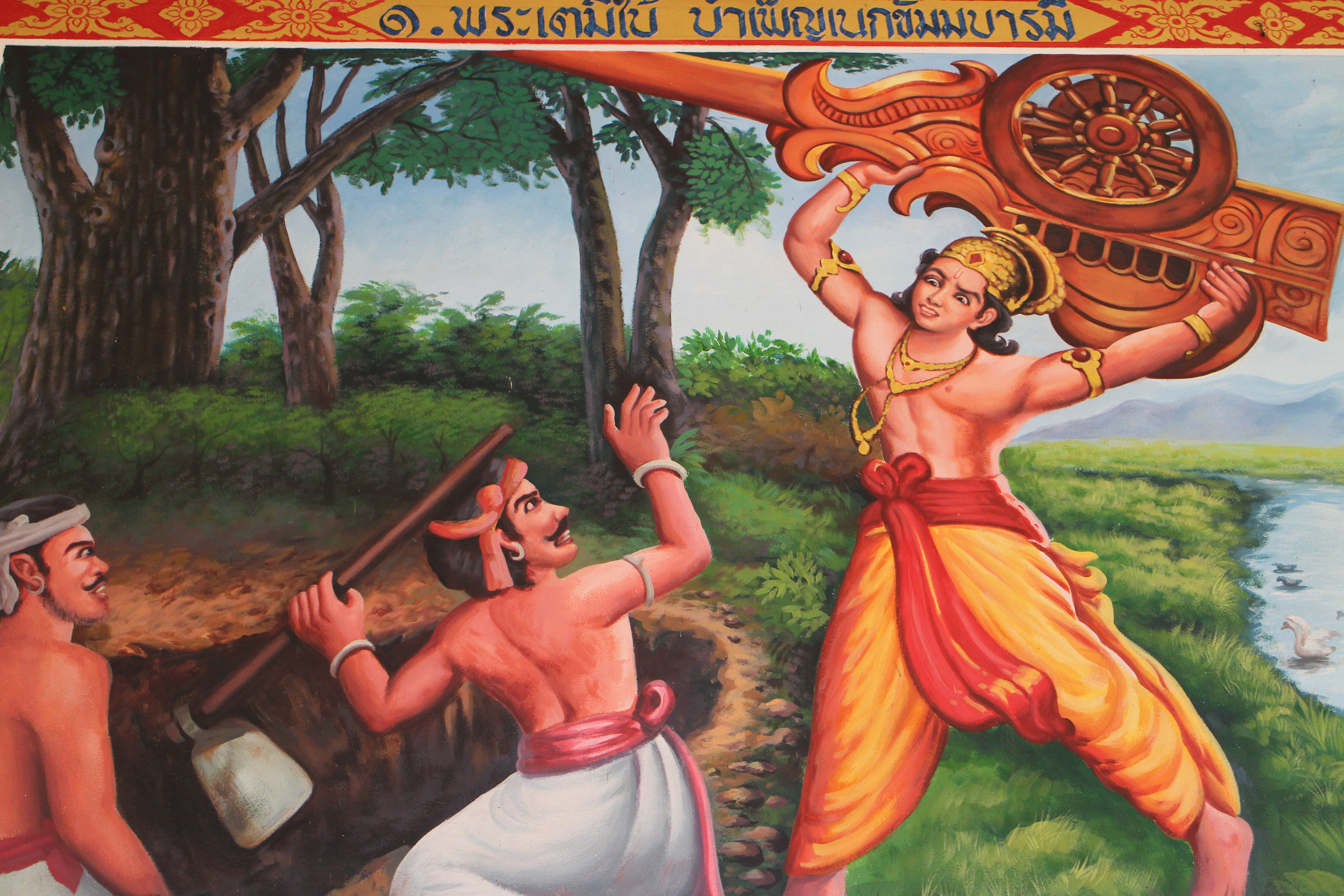
Temiya lifts the chariot up high.

(Khmer: ព្រះតេមិយ Thai: พระเตมีย์ Burmese: တေမိယဇာတ်)

The infant bodhisattva Temiya did not want to be the next king of Benares, so he pretended to be a crippled mute. When Temiya was 16 years of age, King Kasiraya was advised not to name an apparent idiot heir to the throne. The soothsayers spoke: "It will be best to have some unlucky horses yoked to an unlucky chariot and placing him therein, to convey him to the charnel ground and bury him there." On that final day Sunanda, the charioteer, began to dig a hole. The Bodhisattva thought, "This is my time for an effort to escape". He lifted the chariot up high while speaking: "Behold these arms and legs of mine, and hear my voice and what I say; if in this wood you bury me, you will incur great guilt today." The charioteer set him free. So he went straight to the forest to live as an ascetic.

=== 2. Prince Mahajanaka (the lost prince) - Act of vigour (viriya) ===
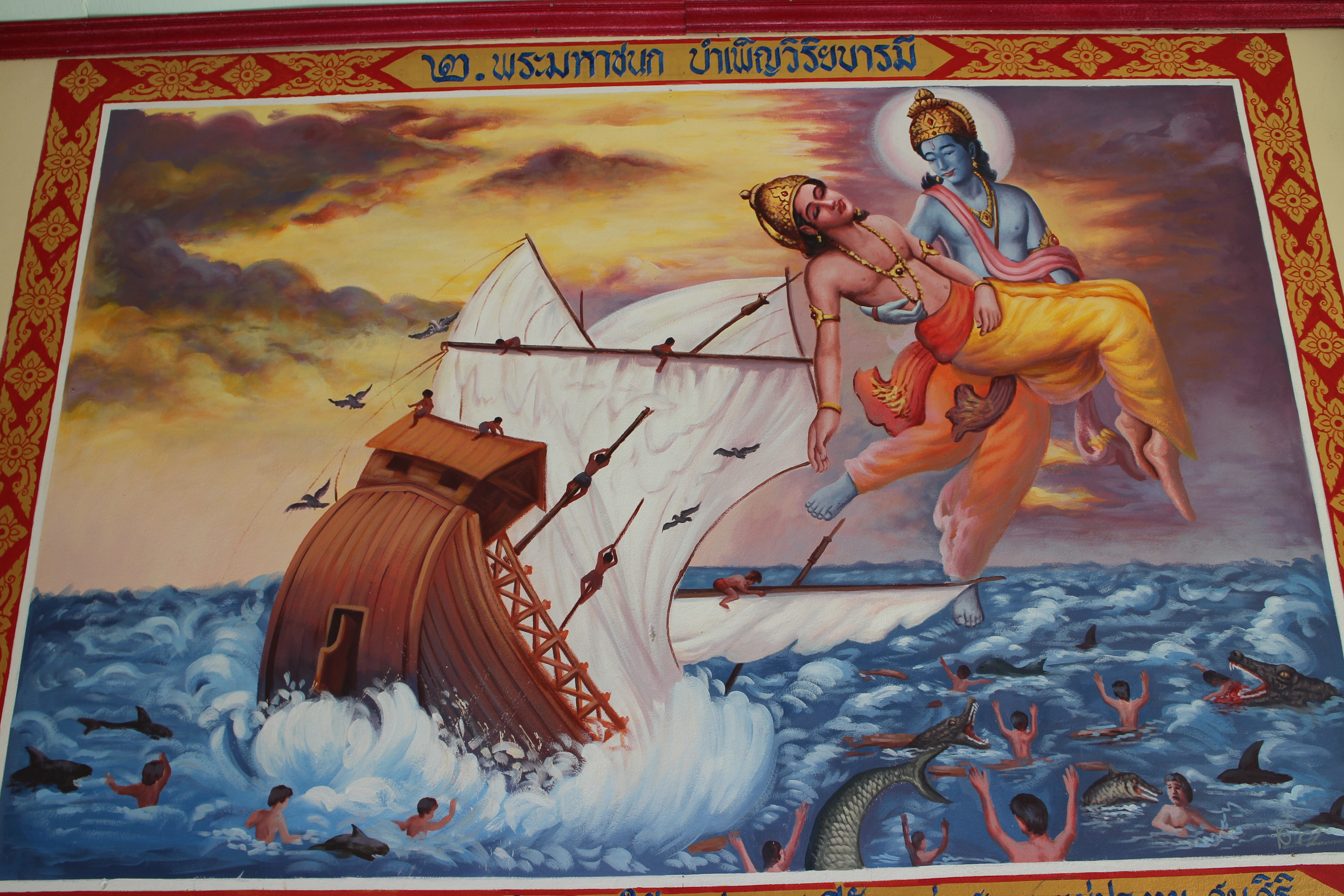
The version in which Mahajanaka is rescued by Visnu instead.

(Khmer: ព្រះមហាជនក Thai: พระมหาชนก Burmese: မဟာဇနကမင်းသား)

Prince Mahajanaka embarked on board a ship bound for Suvarnabhumi, the golden land in the East, with the purpose of regaining his deceased father's Kingdom of Videha. The ship, having been violently tossed on the seas as it sailed its course, could not survive the damage. Planks gave way, the water rose higher and higher, and the ship began to sink in the middle of the ocean. Although knowing the vessel was doomed, Mahajanaka did not panic. He prepared himself for the ordeal by eating until his belly was full. For seven days Mahajanaka floated in the ocean before the goddess Manimekhala observed him in the water. She recognized the perseverance of Mahajanaka and carried him away to Mithila. Mahajanaka went on to marry his cousin, princess Sīvalī, and was rightfully crowned as the new king of Videha. After siring a child and a fulfilling reign, he renounced the world and became a rishi.

=== 3. Prince Suvanna Sāma (the devoted prince) - Act of benevolence (mettā) ===
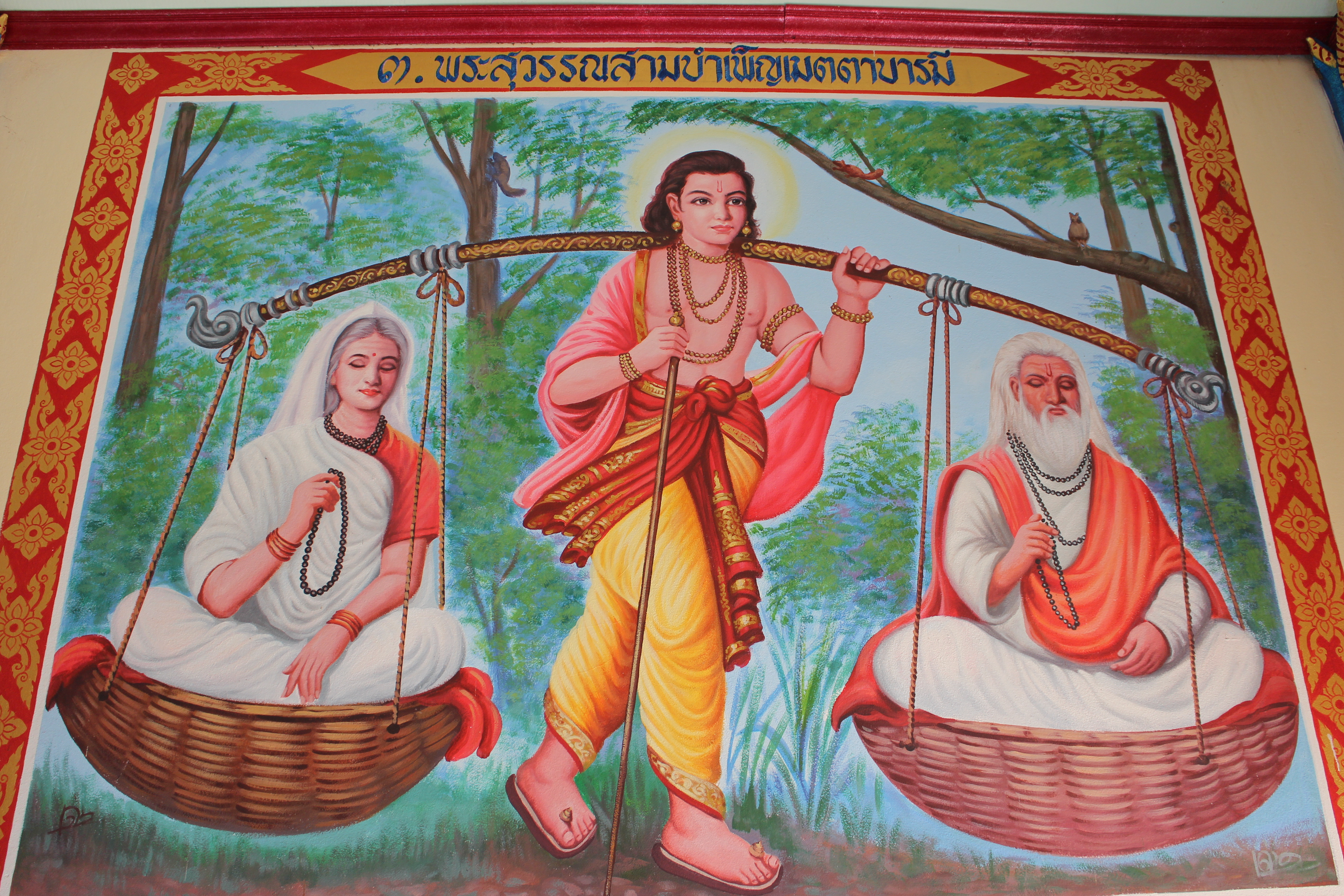
Sama cares for his blind parents.

(Khmer: ព្រះសុវណ្ណសាម Thai: พระสุวรรณสาม Burmese: သုဝဏ္ဏသာမလုလင်)

Sama's parents lost their sight when he was 16 years old. From then on he was their only help. He took care of his parents. Every day he went to the Migasammata River to gather fruit and took water in a pot. At that time King Piliyakkha of Benares, in his great desire for venison, also came to the river and at last reached the spot where Sama stood. Seeing Sama taming the wild animals, the King was wondering whether the creature was a god or a Nāga. To find out, he decided to wound and disable him, and then ask. The King shot a poisoned arrow and wounded Sama, who fell to the ground. Sama spoke: "I have no enmity against anyone. Who has wounded me?" The King went to Sama and asked him his name. Sama then told the King the story of fostering his blind parents. The King thought to himself, "I have done evil to such a holy being; how can I comfort him?" He decided to bring the blind parents to their son. In the meantime the goddess Bahusodari decided to help Sama and his parents. In the end Sama recovered from his wound and both of his parents' sight was restored.

=== 4. Prince Nemi (the noble king) - Act of absolute determination (adhiṭṭhāna) ===
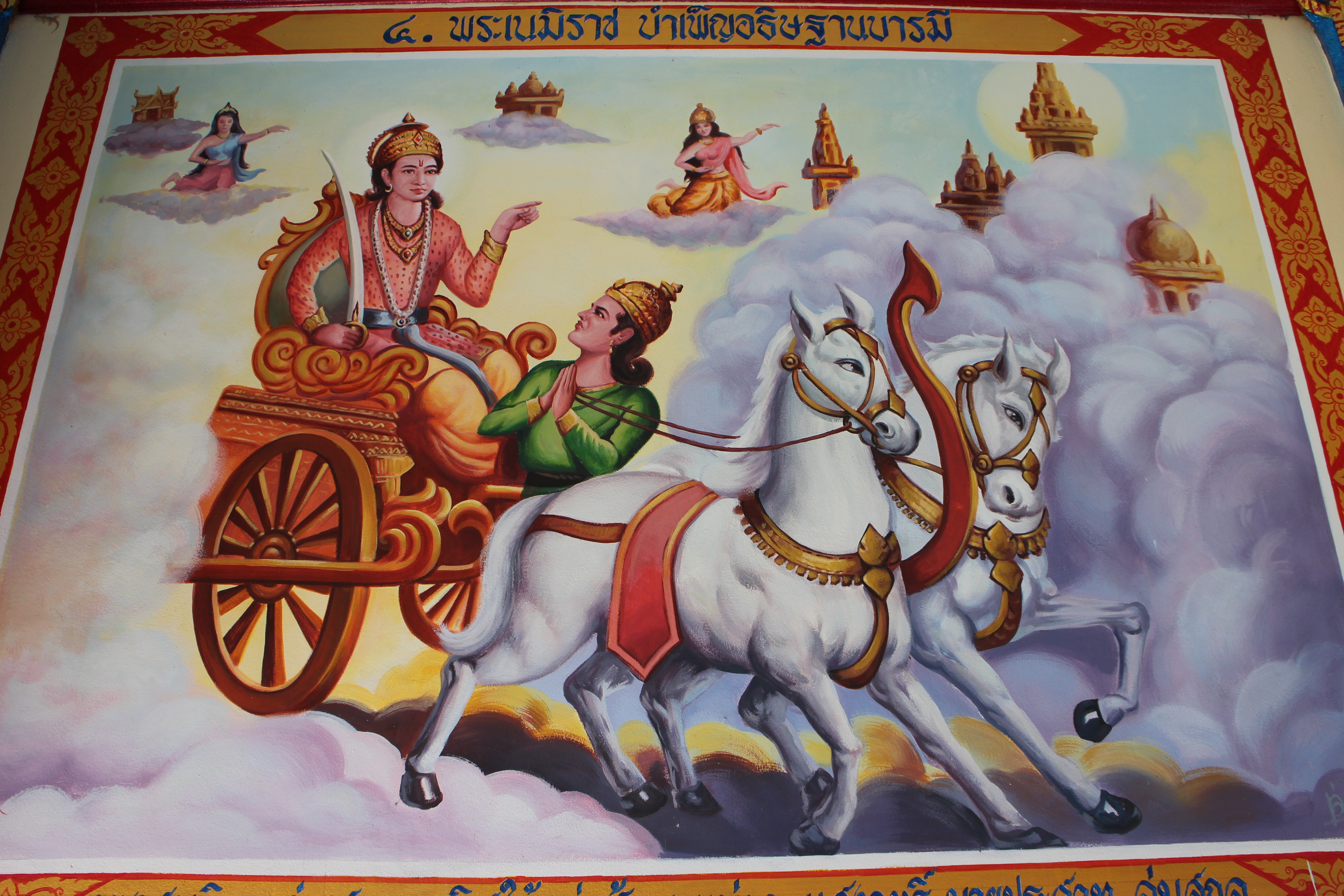
Nimi rides towards Heaven.

(Khmer: ព្រះនេមិរាជ Thai: พระเนมิราช Burmese: နေမိမင်း)

Nemi, as king of Videha, yearned to know the answer to his question: "Which is more fruitful, the holy life or almsgiving?" God Śakra (Buddhism) said: "Although holy living is more fruitful by far than almsgiving, yet both these are important." The deities of heaven longed to see King Nemi. God Sakka sent Matali, the charioteer, to bring Nemi to Sakka's Heaven. On his way, King Nemi chose first to see Hell and later Heaven. When Nimi saw all the suffering in Hell, he was terrified. Later they arrived at Sudhamma Hall— the assembly hall of the 33 gods in Heaven. Nemi discoursed with the gods for seven days but refused to live in this Heaven forever. Thereafter he returned to the world of men. He told his people about the happiness of the gods, and exhorted them to give alms and do good so they would be reborn in that divine place.

=== 5. Prince Mahosadha (the clever sage) - Act of insight (paññā) ===
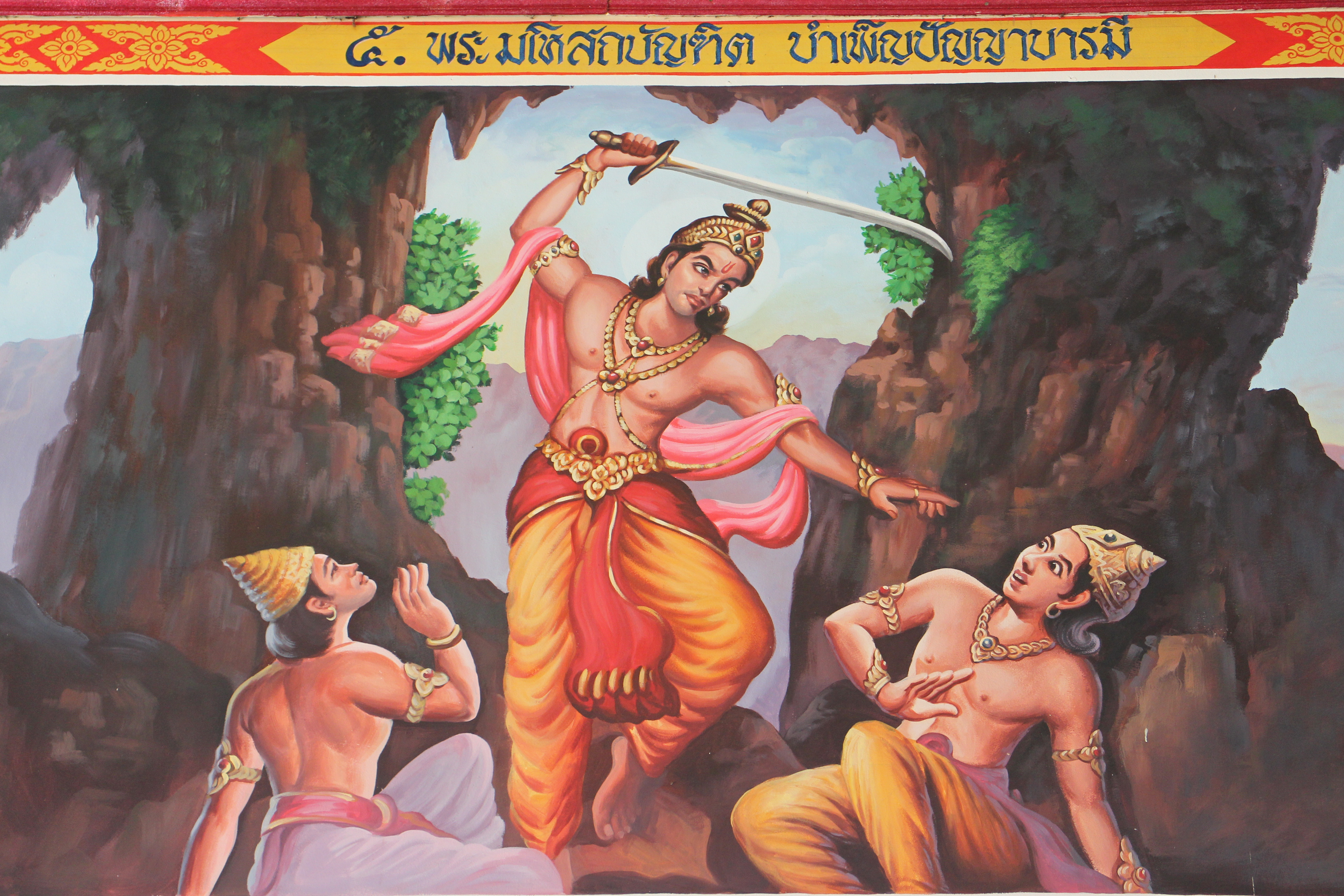
Mahosadha swings his sword up high.

(Khmer: ព្រះមហោសថ Thai: พระมโหสถ Burmese: မဟော်သဓာသုခမိန်)

Mahosadha was a sage and minister to King Vedeha of Mithila. King Culani of Kampilla, a rival kingdom, had a sage called Kevatta. After a failed attempt to conquer the whole of India, Kevatta had a plan to kill King Vedeha. Culani's beautiful daughter, Pancala-candi should seduce King Vedeha. Despite Mahosadha's warning, King Vedeha began to plan his journey to Culani's kingdom. Four months in advance of the arrival of King Vedeha, Mahosadha started to build a palace one mile outside the capital Uttara-pancala. This palace had a secret tunnel, which led to the Ganges River and to Culani's palace. When King Vedeha arrived at his new palace, King Culani's troops surrounded it. Reacting to this threat, Mahosadha sent King Vedeha through the tunnel to the Ganges River, and troops to Culani's palace. These troops tricked Culani's family to go through the tunnel to the Ganges River. King Vedeha and Culani's family went by boat to the Kingdom of Mithila. Soon after Culani learned of the disappearance of King Vedeha and his family. When King Culani met Mahosadha, he realized that he could not hurt him, because his family had been taken hostage. But when both men walked through the tunnel, Mahosadha immediately took the sword, which he had hidden the day before. He swung his sword up high and shouted: "Sire, whose are all the kingdoms of India?" King Culani replied: "Yours, wise sir! Spare me!" Mahosadha said: "Be not troubled, sire: queen, son and mother all come back, my return is the only condition." Then Mahosadha handed over his sword to the king. At last the two men swore a sincere friendship.

=== 6. Prince Bhūridatta (the Naga prince) - Act of morality (sīla) ===
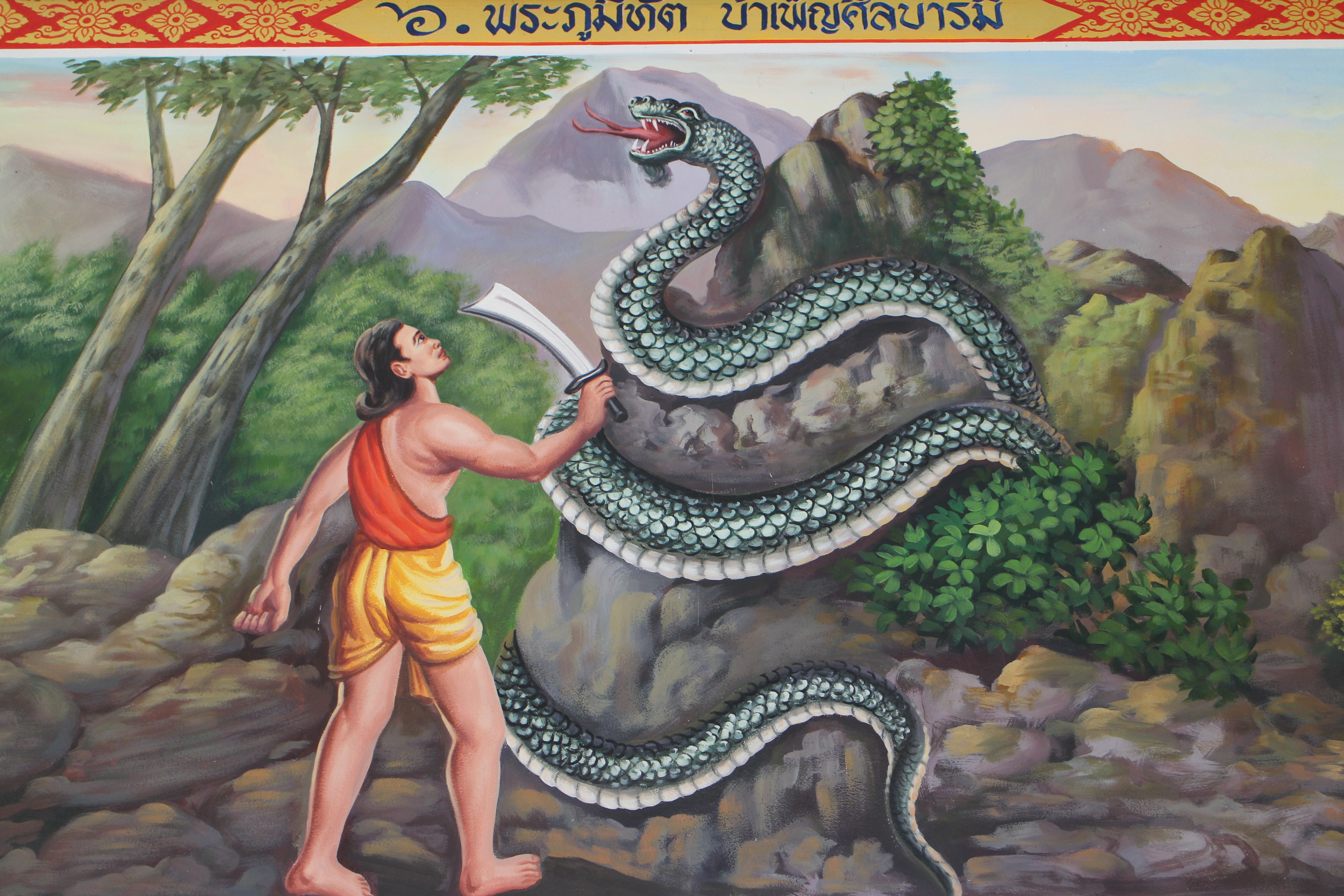
Bhuridatta is caught.

(Khmer: ព្រះភូរិទត្ត Thai: พระภูริทัต Burmese: ဘူရိဒတ်နဂါး)

Nāga Prince Bhūridatta had found an ant hill near the Yamuna river. Every night he folded his body on top of this ant hill. Alambayana, a snake charmer captured the Naga prince with ease, because Bhuridatta had said of himself: "Let who will take my skin or muscles or bones or blood." Alambayana forced him into a basket and went to a certain village. He set the basket down in the middle of the marketplace and ordered the Naga prince to come out. The great snake danced causing great wonder among the villagers. When they went from village to village, they earned a lot of money. Then they reached Benares. Bhuridatta's wife and mother had missed him so very much. They sent his brother Sudassana to search for him. When he arrived in Benares, the people were gathering to watch the snake show. When Bhuridatta lifted his head out of the basket, he saw his brother in the crowd. He went to him, placed his head on his brother's foot and wept. At last Alambayana exclaimed three times: "I will set the snake prince free."

=== 7. Prince Canda Kumara (the honorable prince) - Act of patience (khanti) ===
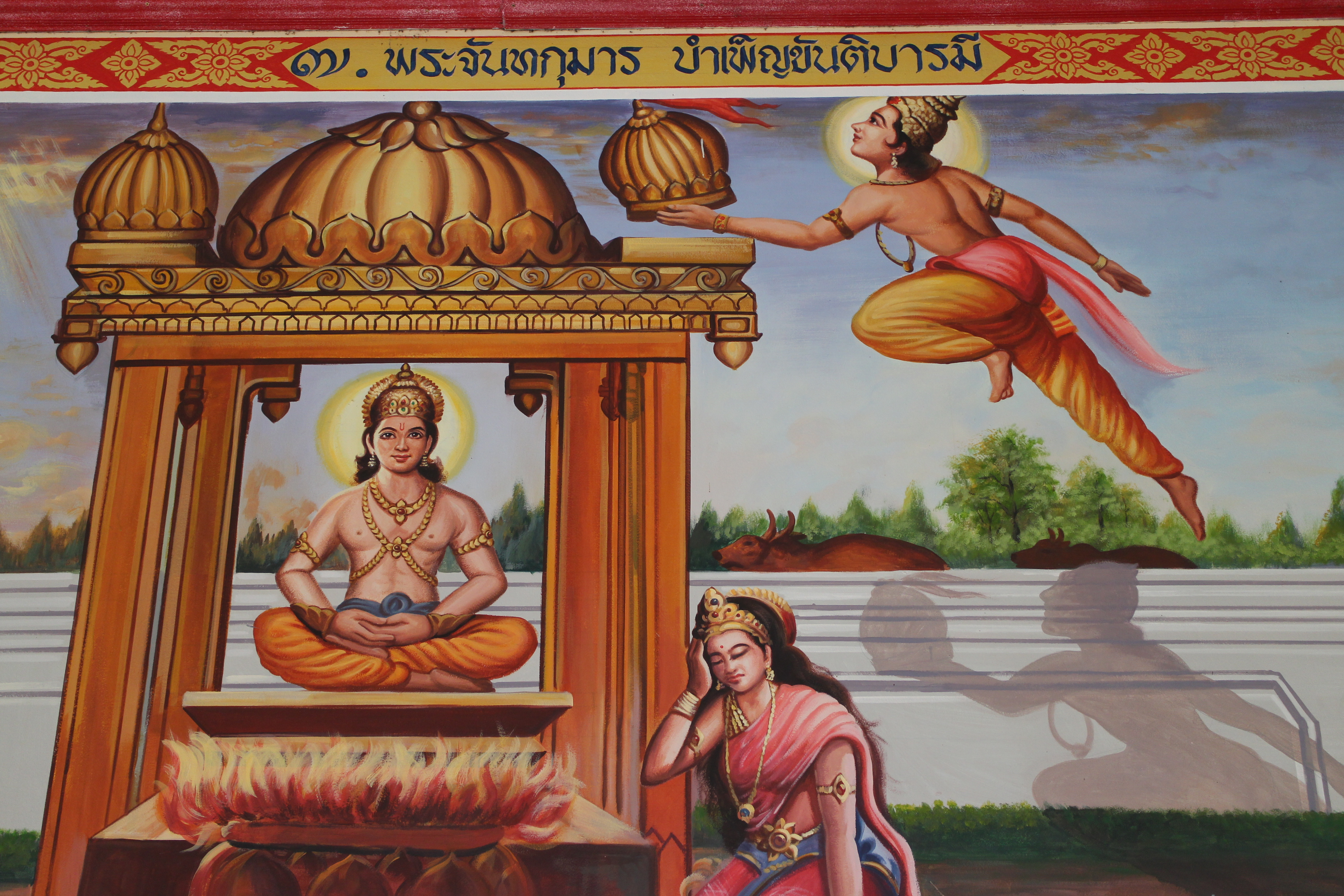
Canda Kumara sacrifies himself.

(Khmer: ព្រះចន្ទកុមារ Thai: พระจันทกุมาร Burmese: စန္ဒကုမာရမင်းသား)

Prince Canda Kumara served his father, King Ekaraja of Pupphavati as a viceroy. Khandahala, a Brahmin, was the family priest. The King had a high opinion of his wisdom and made him a judge. But he took bribes and dispossessed the real owners and put the wrong owners in possession. The Prince was the Brahmin's natural foe. One day, the King saw the beautiful heaven in his dream. He asked Khandahala the way to this heaven. Khandahala answered: "It will cost you a lot. You must sacrifice: your sons, queens, merchant princes, bulls, steeds, four pieces of these species, with the proper ritual, this will give you entrance into this heaven." The King, not being of sound mind, gave the order to prepare for a massive sacrifice outside the city. Canda Kumara asked his father not to go through with this sacrifice, though not to save himself, because he was willing to die but for the sake of the innocent victims. The troops rounded up the doomed. When all the preparations were completed they brought Canda Kumara to the sacrificial pit. At that moment Queen Canda Suriya called upon the gods. God Sakka let lightning destroy the royal parasols. Without these parasols there was no longer a sacred ceremony. Whereupon the angry crowd attacked Khandahala and killed him. King Ekajara was sent into exile and Canda Kumara became the new king.

=== 8. Lord Brahma Nārada (the Great Brahma) - Act of equanimity (upekkhā) ===
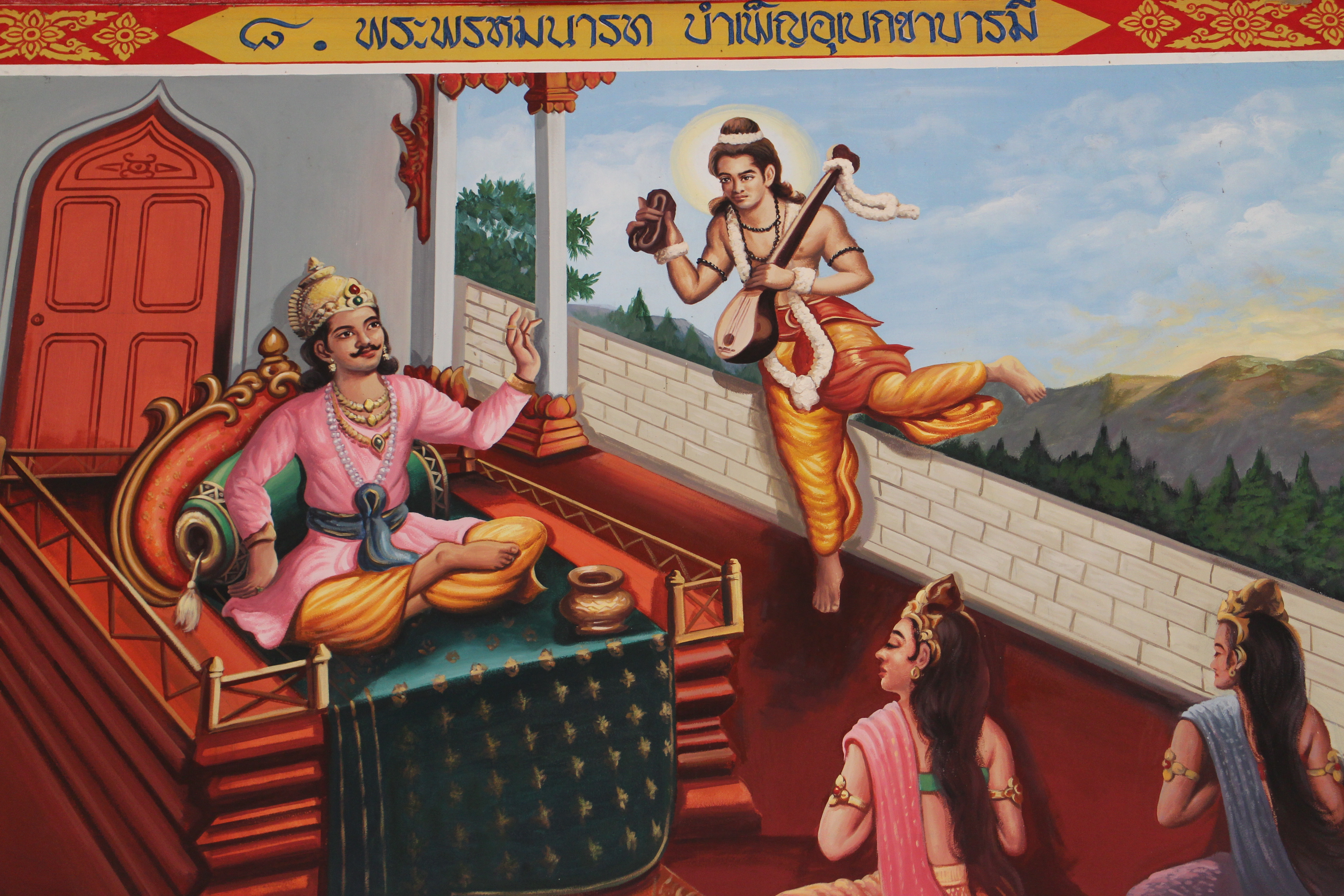
Narada gives 500 pieces of gold to the king.

(Khmer: ព្រះព្រហ្មនារទ Thai: พระพรหมนารท Burmese: နာရဒဗြဟ္မာ)

Angati was king of the Kingdom of Videha. On the eve of the full moon festival, King Angati went to the deer park to meet Guna Kassapa, a naked ascetic. He asked the rules of good behaviour with respect to parents, teachers, wives, children, the elderly, the Brahmins, the army and his people. Guna replied: "There is no fruit, good or evil, in following the rules of right conduct; there is no other world. All beings are predestined, what then is the use of giving alms." King Angati, convinced of the truth of Guna's words, decided to make no further effort to do good. Narada, who was the Great Brahma of that time, looked down on the earth. He descended to the earth and spoke: "I'm Brahma and I'll tell you that you condemn yourself to hell." Angati replied: "If there is another world for the dead, then give me here five hundred pieces of gold, and I'll give you a thousand pieces of gold in the next world." Narada answered: "Here when a man is a lover of sin, wise men don't entrust a loan to him: there is no return from such a debtor." Narada described Hell with its endless torments. Angati was trembling with fear. He looked for the Bodhisatta for help and asked him how he could regain his senses. Narada then told him that while he was King and in good health, he was not providing for the poor, the hungry, the aged and the Brahmins. King Angati begged for forgiveness. Narada sped back to the brahma world.

=== 9. Vidhura Panditta (the eloquent sage) - Act of reality (sacca) ===
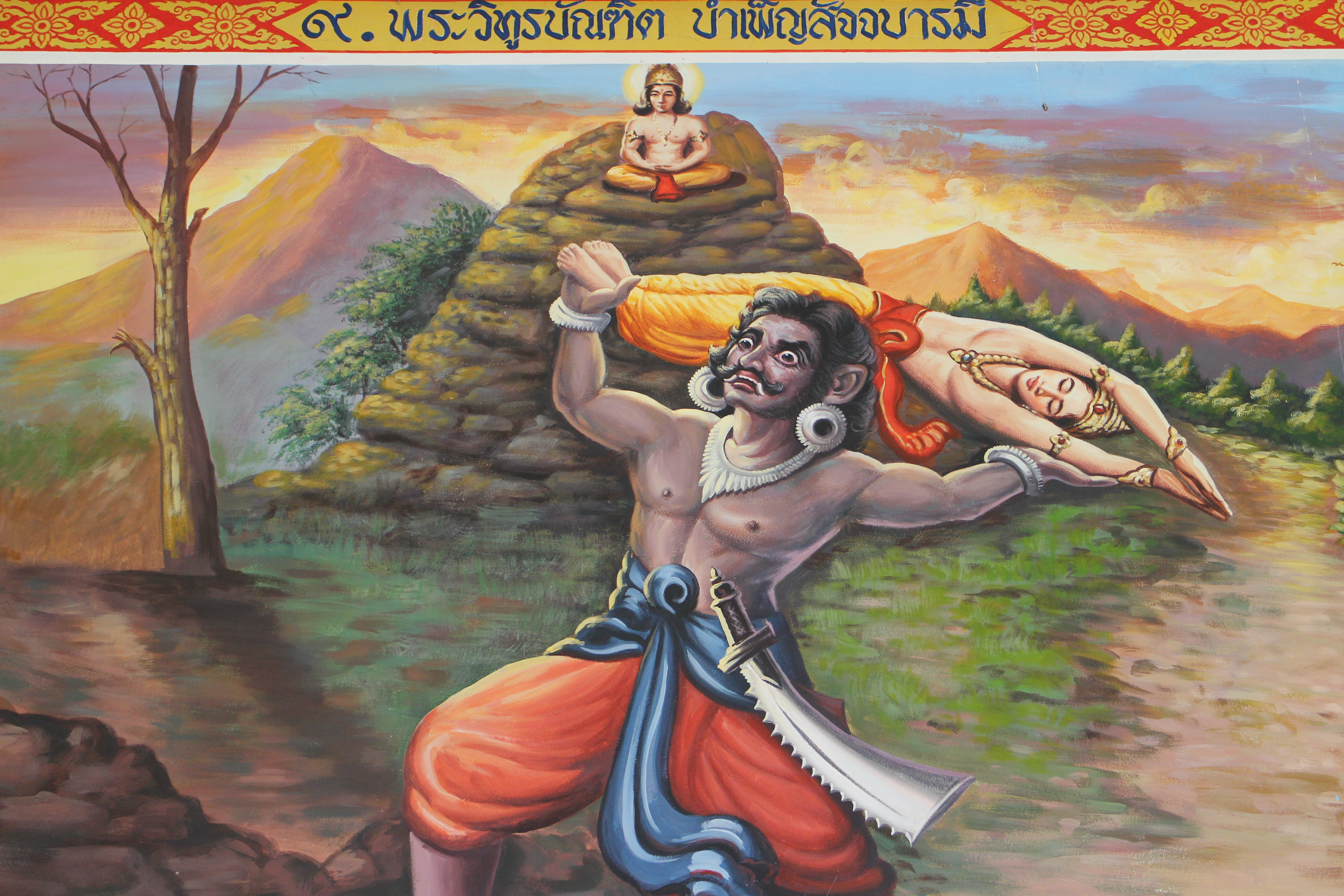
Punnaka whirls Vidhura round.

(Khmer: ព្រះវិធុរបណ្ឌិត Thai: พระวิธูรบัณฑิต Burmese: ဝိဓူရအမတ်)

King Dhananjaya lived in the city of Indapatta in the Kingdom of Kuru. Vidhura Panditta (the Bodhisatta) who was his sage, had a great eloquence in discoursing on the law. Naga Queen Vimala longed to hear him speaking. She pretended to be ill and only one thing could cure her. She said she desired Vidhura's heart or she will die. Irandati, the beautiful daughter of King Varuna, was sent out to seek a husband, who could bring Vidhura's heart to her. Punnaka, a yak (or demon) heard her love call and decided to marry her. King Varuna said: "If you bring that sage here then Irandati will be your lawful wife." Punnaka went to Indapatta to meet King Dhananjaya to play a game of dice. Having manipulated three rounds dicing, Punnaka asked for payment—the sage Vidhura. The King agreed to give him away. Punnaka seized Vidhura with a roar and whirled him round his head. Vidhura undismayed asked: "What is your reason for killing me." When Punnaka told him why, the Bodhisatta perceived that a misconception had brought about all this calamity. He said: "Vimala has no need of Vidhura's heart, but she must have felt a great longing to hear my words." The Bodhisatta asked to be brought to the Naga kingdom to clear up this misunderstanding.

=== 10. Prince Vessantara (the charitable prince) - Act of generosity (dāna) ===
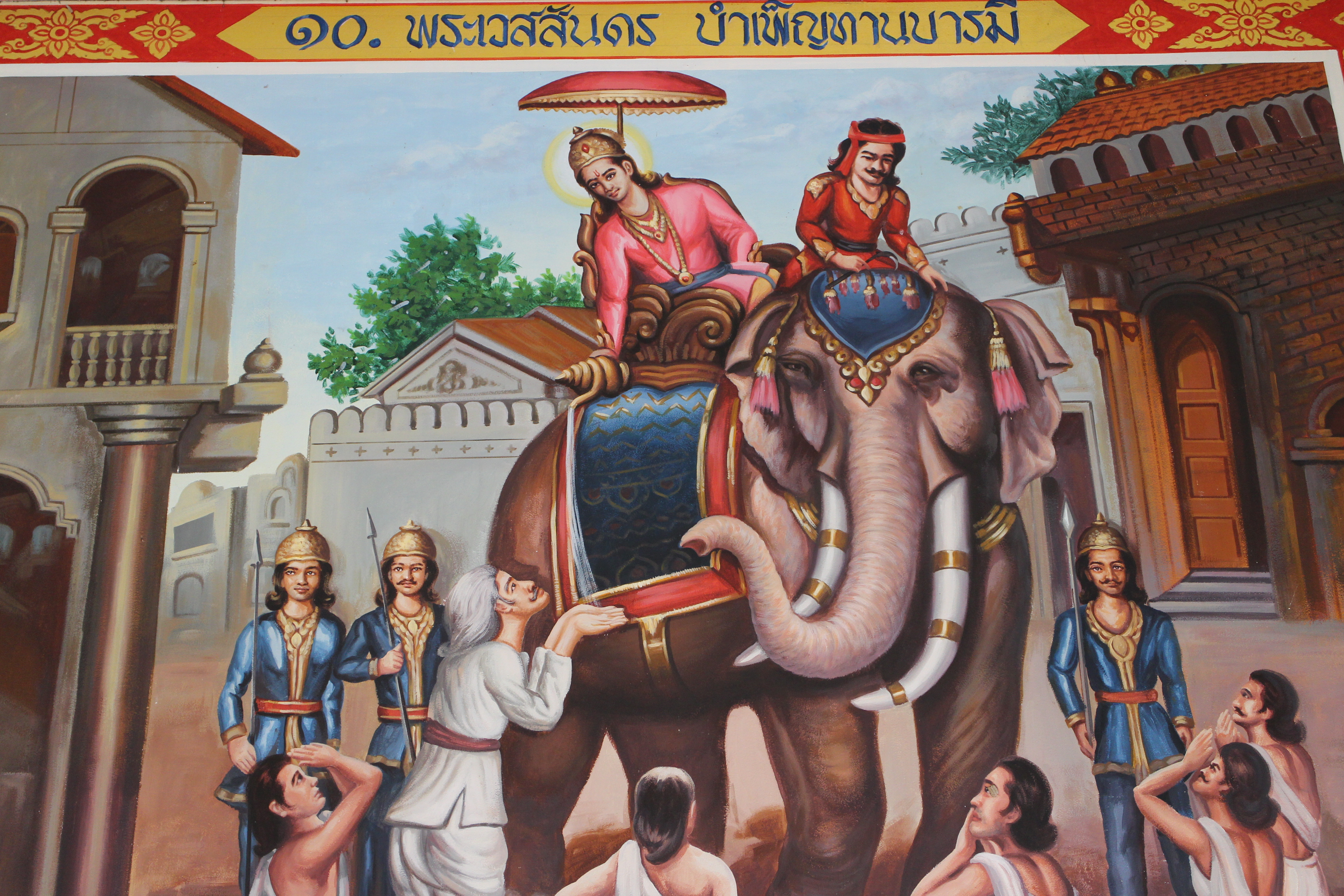
Vessantara gives alms.

(Khmer: ព្រះវេស្សន្តរ Thai: พระเวสสันดร Burmese: ဝေဿန္တရာမင်းကြီး)

Prince Vessantara lived in the capital city of Jetuttara of the Kingdom of Sivi and was devoted to almsgiving, but was never satisfied with giving. He gave Paccaya, the royal white elephant, to the neighboring Kingdom of Kalinga, affected by drought. The people were so angry about it, that King Sanjaya had to send away his son. Before Prince Vessantara and his wife and two children went into exile, he gave away all his possessions. On the road travelling by horse and buggy, he gave them to a Brahmin. So the four went through the jungle on foot to Mount Vamka. Jujaka (Thai: Chuchok) a poor old Brahmin lived in the village of Dunnivittha with Ammittada, a beautiful young woman. Jujaka, prompted by his wife, wanted to look for the whereabouts of Vessantara. After Jujaka had asked for Kanha and Jali, Vessantara's children, they hid in a pond. Vessantara asked the children to come out of the pond and go with Jujaka. God Sakka changed shape and stopped Vessantara who also gave away his wife. While Jujaka was asleep, a god and a goddess, who were changed to the father and mother, took care of the two children. After King Sanjaya had bought back his two grandchildren, they went with Queen Phusati to Mount Vamka. Prince Vessantara returned with his whole family from Mount Vamka. Back in the city of Jetutthara they were warmly welcomed.
