= Typhoon Higos (2002) =

Pacific typhoon in 2002

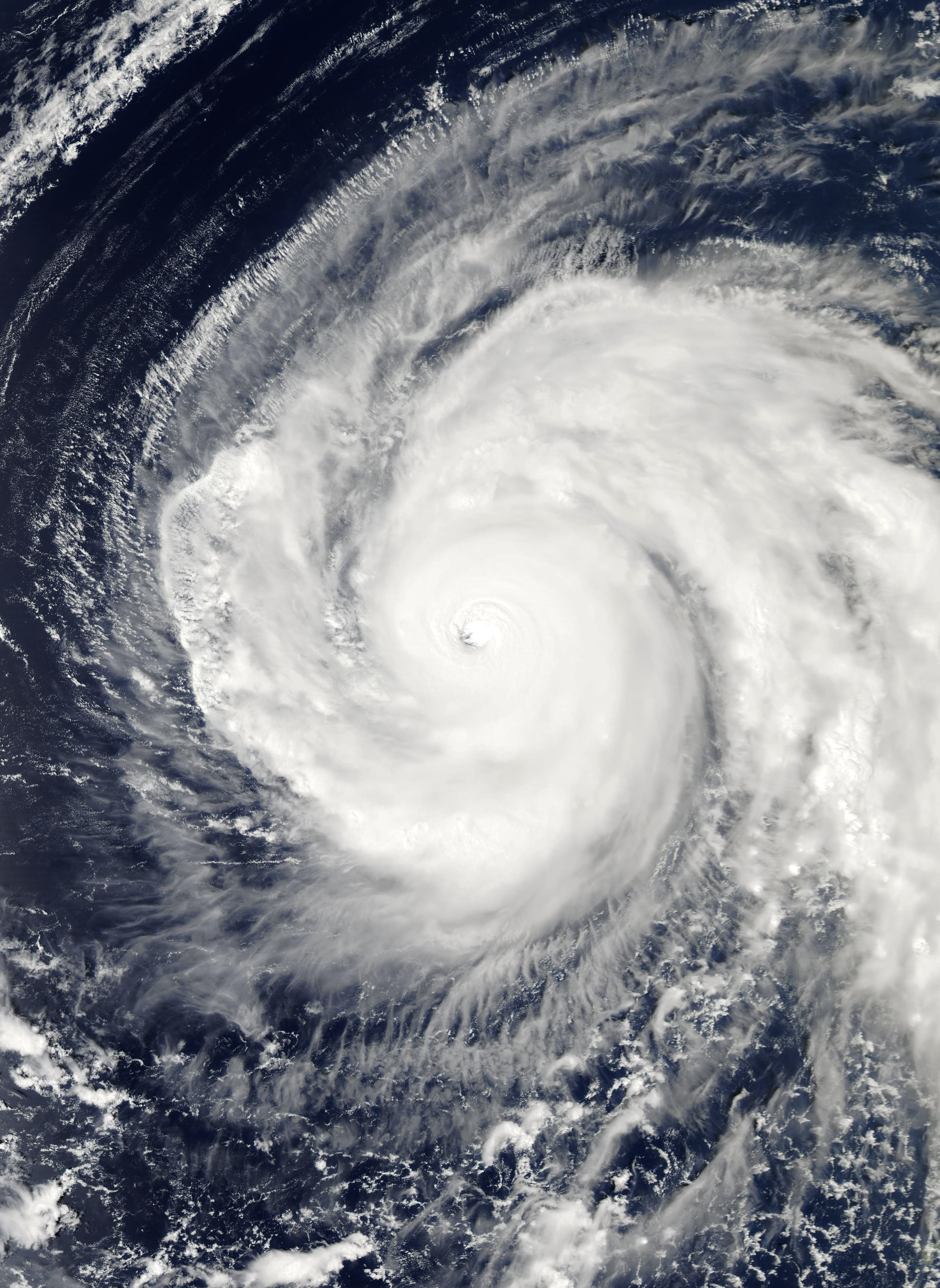
- Typhoon Higos near peak intensity on September 29

Meteorological history
- Formed: September 25, 2002
- Extratropical: October 2, 2002
- Dissipated: October 4, 2002

Very strong typhoon
- 10-minute sustained (JMA)
- Highest winds: 175 km/h (110 mph)
- Lowest pressure: 930 hPa (mbar); 27.46 inHg

Category 4-equivalent super typhoon
- 1-minute sustained (SSHWS/JTWC)
- Highest winds: 250 km/h (155 mph)
- Lowest pressure: 904 hPa (mbar); 26.70 inHg

Overall effects
- Fatalities: 12 total
- Damage: $2.14 billion (2002 USD)
- Areas affected: Northern Mariana Islands, Japan, Russian Far East
- IBTrACS
- Part of the 2002 Pacific typhoon season

Typhoon Higos (Note: The name Higos (Chamorro: higos, [higos]) was contributed by the United States and means fig in Chamorro.) was, at that time, considered the third strongest typhoon to affect Tokyo since World War II. The 21st named storm of the 2002 Pacific typhoon season, Higos developed on September 25 east of the Northern Marianas Islands. It tracked west-northwestward for its first few days, steadily intensifying into a powerful typhoon by September 29. Higos subsequently weakened and turned to the north-northeast toward Japan, making landfall in that country's Kanagawa Prefecture on October 1. It weakened while crossing Honshu, and shortly after striking Hokkaidō, Higos became extratropical on October 2. The remnants passed over Sakhalin and dissipated on October 4.

Before striking Japan, Higos produced strong winds in the Northern Marianas Islands while passing to their north. These winds damaged the food supply on two islands. Later, Higos moved across Japan with wind gusts as strong as 161 km/h (100 mph), including record gusts at several locations. A total of 608,130 buildings in the country were left without power, and two people were electrocuted in the storm's aftermath. The typhoon also dropped heavy rainfall that peaked at 346 mm (13.6 in). The rains flooded houses across the country and caused mudslides. High waves washed 25 boats ashore and killed one person along the coast. Damage in the country totaled JP¥261 billion ($2.14 billion in 2002 USD), (Note: All damage totals are in 2002 United States dollars and Japanese yen unless otherwise noted.) and there were five deaths in the country. Later, the remnants of Higos affected the Russian Far East, killing seven people involved in two shipwrecks offshore Primorsky Krai.

== Meteorological history ==
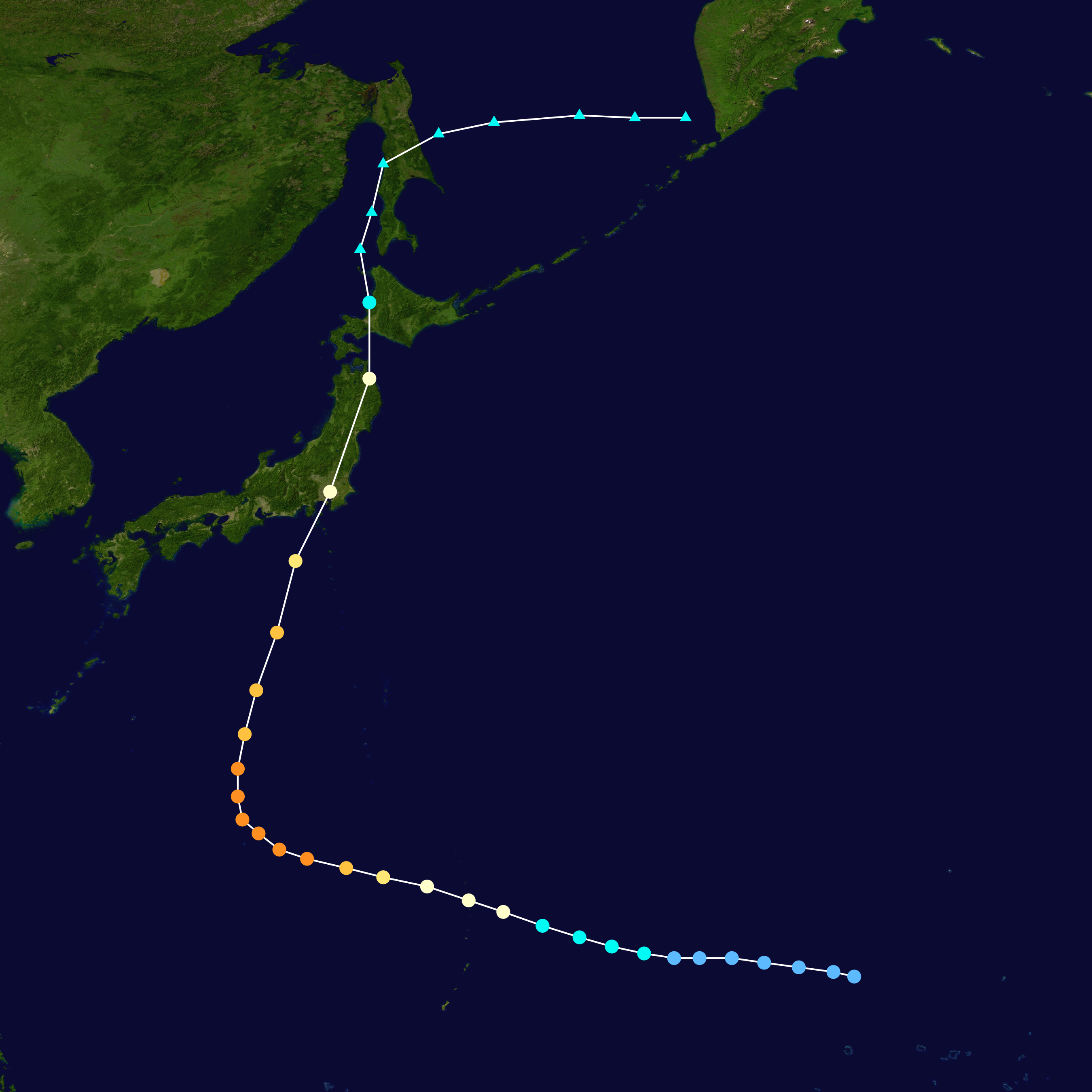
Map plotting the storm's track and intensity, according to the Saffir–Simpson scale Map key Saffir–Simpson scale Tropical depression (≤38 mph, ≤62 km/h) Tropical storm (39–73 mph, 63–118 km/h) Category 1 (74–95 mph, 119–153 km/h) Category 2 (96–110 mph, 154–177 km/h) Category 3 (111–129 mph, 178–208 km/h) Category 4 (130–156 mph, 209–251 km/h) Category 5 (≥157 mph, ≥252 km/h) Unknown Storm type Tropical cyclone Subtropical cyclone Extratropical cyclone, remnant low, tropical disturbance, or monsoon depression

The Joint Typhoon Warning Center (JTWC) (Note: The Joint Typhoon Warning Center is a joint United States Navy – United States Air Force task force that issues tropical cyclone warnings for the western Pacific Ocean and other regions.) first monitored an area of disturbed weather on September 25. At the time, the system consisted of a weak circulation, but with good outflow and located in an area of low wind shear. The system moved to the west-northwest, steered by a subtropical ridge to the east of Japan. On September 26, a tropical depression developed about 925 km (575 mi) east of the Northern Marianas Islands, and also to the south of the Japanese island of Minamitorishima. Later that day, the Japan Meteorological Agency (JMA) (Note: The Japan Meteorological Agency is the official Regional Specialized Meteorological Center for the western Pacific Ocean.) upgraded the depression to Tropical Storm Higos, at the same time that the JTWC also upgraded to a tropical storm. By that time, the system had developed an organized area of convection.

The storm gradually intensified while passing to the north of Saipan, and Higos attained typhoon status on September 27. Shortly thereafter, it also passed just south of Pagan Island. A well-defined eye 15 km (9.3 mi) in diameter developed, and Higos rapidly intensified. At 1200 UTC on September 29, Typhoon Higos reached its peak intensity. The JMA estimated 10 minute maximum sustained winds of 175 km/h (109 mph), and the JTWC estimated 1 minute winds of 250 km/h (160 mph), which made Higos a super typhoon. After having moved west-northwestward for several days, Higos slowed and began turning to the north while it was at peak strength. Its change in movement was due to an eastward-moving trough creating a weakness in the ridge. The typhoon accelerated to the north-northeast toward Japan and gradually weakened due to increasing wind shear.

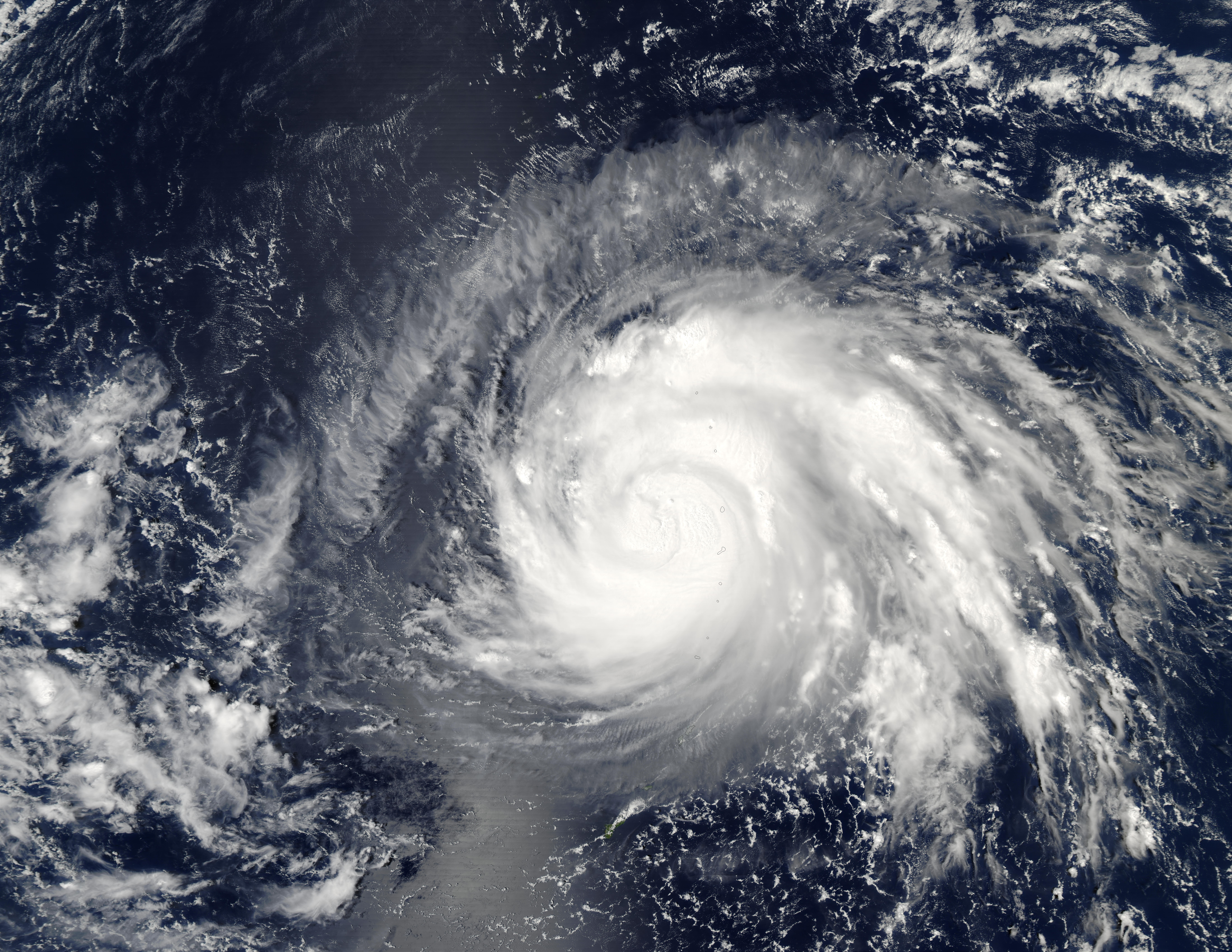
Tropical Storm Higos near the Northern Mariana Islands on September 28

At around 1100 UTC on October 1, Higos passed just east of the Miura Peninsula with winds of 130 km/h (81 mph), about 30 minutes before making landfall in the eastern portion of Kanagawa Prefecture near Yokosuka. Higos passed very near Tokyo around 1200 UTC that day, becoming the third strongest typhoon to affect the city since World War II, according to the JTWC. The typhoon weakened into a tropical storm while crossing Honshu. Higos briefly emerged over waters, before making a second landfall on Tomakomai, Hokkaidō at 2100 UTC on October 1. By that time, the storm was beginning to transition into an extratropical cyclone, and at 0600 UTC on October 2 Higos completed the transition. Simultaneously, the JTWC discontinued advisories. The storm continued to the north before crossing Sakhalin. The remnants dissipated on October 4 just west of the Kamchatka Peninsula.

== Preparations and impact ==
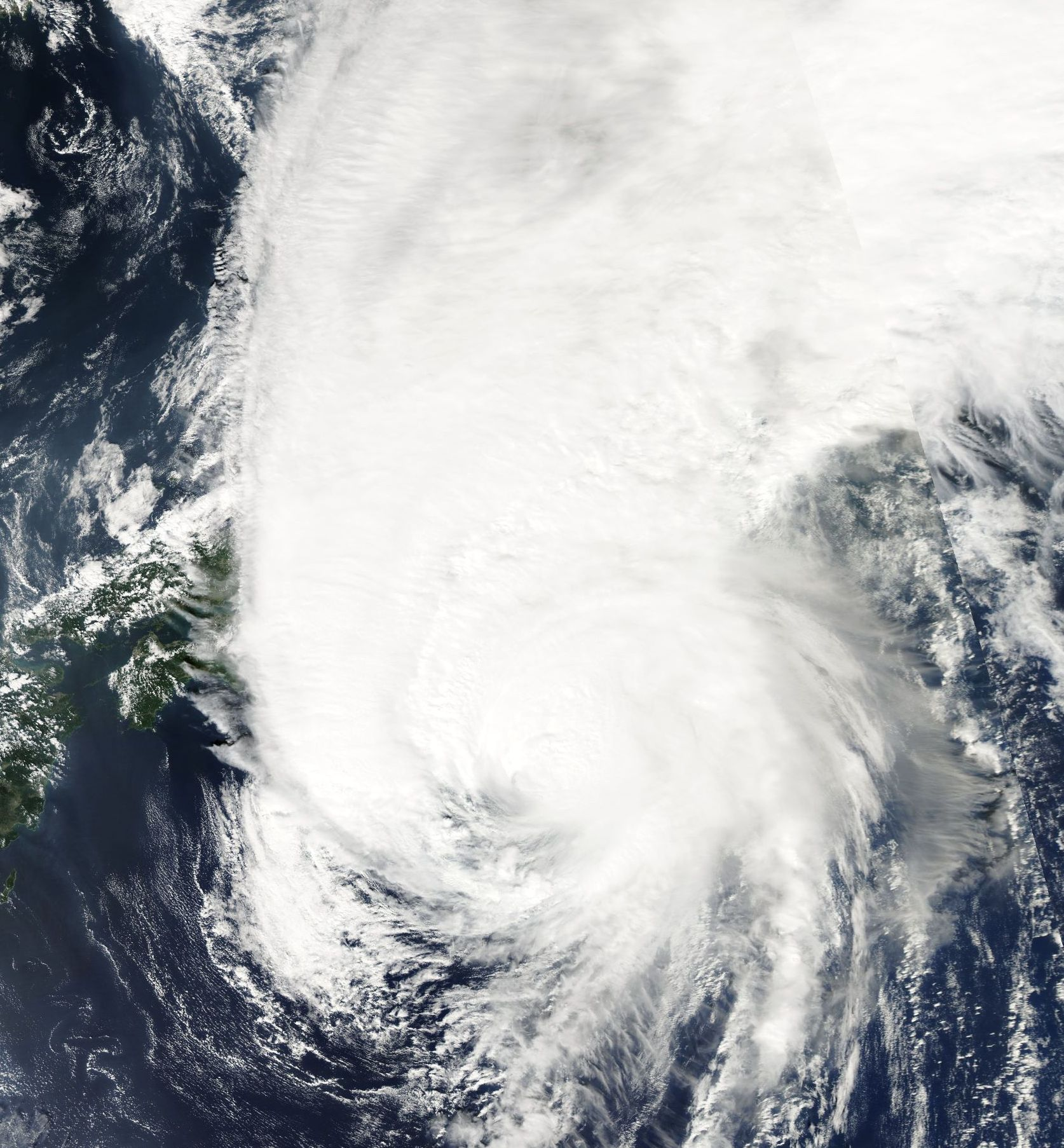
Typhoon Higos approaching Japan on October 1

Typhoon Higos first affected the Northern Marianas Islands, producing winds of 94 km/h (58 mph), with gusts to 183 km/h (114 mph) on Pagan Island. The typhoon caused heavy crop damage in Agrigan and Alamagan, which led to food shortages on the islands. As a result, officials from Saipan sent a boat to the islands with food donated by the local Red Cross chapter.

Before Higos struck Japan, officials canceled 300 airplane flights, and also canceled train lines and ferry service. Some baseball games were postponed, and businesses closed early. The typhoon affected outlying islands of Japan, causing power outages due to strong winds. Upon making landfall in Japan, Higos produced strong winds that peaked at 104 km/h (65 mph) in Shizuoka. Winds in Tokyo reached 94 km/h (58 mph). Stronger wind gusts were reported in Hokkaido after Higos became extratropical, including a peak gust of 161 km/h (100 mph) in Urakawa. Several stations across Japan reported record-high wind gusts. The typhoon also dropped torrential rainfall that peaked at 346 mm (13.6 in) in Hakone, Kanagawa; the same station reported a one-hour total of 80 mm (3.1 in). The typhoon washed 25 boats ashore, including a cargo ship on Izu-Oshima Island. One woman was washed away by high surf.

A total of 2,254 houses were flooded in the country, forcing thousands of people to evacuate. Overall, 2,694 houses were damaged, and another 12 were destroyed. Many houses lost their roofs, and high winds left 608,130 buildings without power in Honshu, along with thousands of power on Hokkaido. Two people were electrocuted by downed power lines. High rainfall caused mudslides near Tokyo, which destroyed a few buildings, and caused the Tama River to reach above-normal levels. Across Japan, the typhoon disrupted transportation by forcing highways to be closed. Storm debris injured several people, and a steel window frame struck and killed a man in Yokohama. A tree fell onto a car, injuring one person. Insured damage in Japan totaled ¥261 billion ($2.14 billion in 2002 USD). (Note: The total was originally reported in Yen. Total converted via the Oanda Corporation website.) In Iwate Prefecture, there was about ¥8 billion ($73 million 2002 USD) in damage, mostly from damaged roads and public buildings. Agriculture damage in the prefecture exceeded ¥2 billion ($18.3 million in 2002 USD) for the first time since Typhoon Mireille in 1991. There were five deaths, and 108 people were injured; this included 55 people who were injured in Tokyo.

After becoming extratropical, Higos affected the Kuril Islands and later Sakhalin. Power was cut in 22 towns, and ferry service was canceled. On Sakhalin, high winds downed many trees, some of which blocked roads. Six people were injured by fallen trees. The remnants of Higos capsized two ships offshore Primorye, killing seven people.

== See also ==
- Other tropical cyclones named Higos
- Tropical cyclones in 2002
- Typhoon Hagibis (2019) – a more powerful and deadlier typhoon that took a similar track towards Japan.
