= List of storms named Higos =

The name Higos has been used for five tropical cyclones in the western North Pacific Ocean. The name was contributed by the United States, and means fig in the Chamorro language.

- Typhoon Higos (2002) (T0221, 25W) – struck Japan
- Tropical Storm Higos (2008) (T0817, 21W, Pablo) – a weak storm that crossed the Philippines and approached China
- Typhoon Higos (2015) (T1502, 02W) – an early-season super typhoon that stayed out to sea
- Severe Tropical Storm Higos (2020) (T2007, 08W, Helen) – strong tropical storm that affected, at peak intensity, Hong Kong, Macau, and China
- Severe Tropical Storm Higos (2026) (T2608, 08W, Gardo) — a weak tropical storm that formed at sea; passed near the coast of Japan.

Preceded by Mekkhala	Pacific typhoon season names Higos	Succeeded by Bavi
