= List of storms named Bavi =

The name Bavi (Vietnamese: Ba Vì, [ʔɓaː˧˧ vi˨˩]) has been used for five tropical cyclones in the western North Pacific Ocean. The name was contributed by Vietnam and refers to the Ba Vì mountain range in Northern Vietnam.

- Severe Tropical Storm Bavi (2002) (T0222, 26W) – never affected land.
- Tropical Storm Bavi (2008) (T0818, 23W) – stayed at the ocean.
- Tropical Storm Bavi (2015) (T1503, 03W, Betty) – a tropical storm that affected Northern Mariana Islands and the Philippines
- Typhoon Bavi (2020) (T2008, 09W, Igme) – Category 3 typhoon that made landfall in North Korea.
- Typhoon Bavi (2026) (T2609, 09W, Inday) – a powerful and long-lived Category 5 super typhoon that ravaged the Northern Mariana Islands and China.

Preceded by Higos	Pacific typhoon season names Bavi	Succeeded by Maysak
