= Lakhon =

Lakhon (sometimes spelled "Lakhaon" or "Lakorn") may refer to:

- Theatre of Cambodia (ល្ខោន)
  - Lakhon Khol, a masked dance theatre
  - Lakhon pol srey (ល្ខោនពោលស្រី), a dance drama genre that originated in the court of Oudong in Cambodia.
  - Lakhon Yiké (ល្ខោនយីកេ), a dance drama genre originating in central Cambodia.
  - Lakhon Bassac (ល្ខោនបាសាក់) the dance drama genre with poetry originating in the Mekong Delta region.
  - Lakhon Mohory (ល្ខោនមហោរី)
- Culture of Thailand
  - Thai television soap opera (ละครโทรทัศน์)
  - Lakhon nai (ละครใน), a performing art that originated in the royal court of Siam
  - Lakhon nok (ละครนอก), a genre of theatre from the Ayutthaya era
  - Lakhon Chatri, a genre of dance and drama from Central Thailand
- Hindi cinema of India (plural of lakh)
  - Lakhon Mein Ek, a 1971 Bollywood comedy film
  - Lakhon Ki Baat, a 1984 Indian Bollywood film
  - Lakhon Mein Ek (TV series), an Indian television series
