= Makuṭa =

Headdress used as crown in Southeast Asia

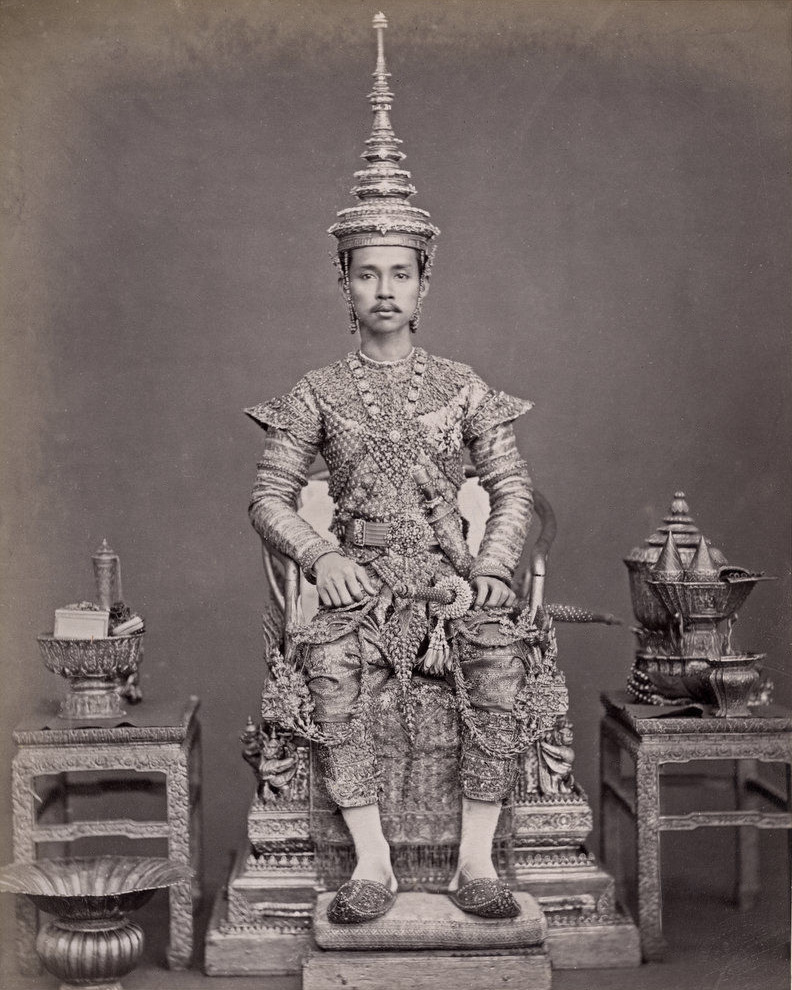
- Chulalongkorn wore makuṭa at his coronation.
- Type: Headwear
- Material: Varies
- Place of origin: Southeast Asia

The makuṭa (Sanskrit: मुकुट), variously known in several languages as makuta, mahkota, magaik, mokot, mongkut or chada (see § Etymology and origins below), is a type of headdress used as crowns in the Southeast Asian monarchies of today's Cambodia and Thailand, and historically in Indonesia (Java, Sumatra, and Bali), Malaysia, Sri Lanka, Laos and Myanmar. They are also used in classical court dances in Cambodia, Indonesia, Malaysia, Sri Lanka and Thailand; such as khol, khon, the various forms of lakhon, as well as wayang wong dance drama. They feature a tall pointed shape, are made of gold or a substitute, and are usually decorated with gemstones. As a symbol of kingship, they are featured in the royal regalia of both Cambodia and Thailand.

== Etymology and origins ==
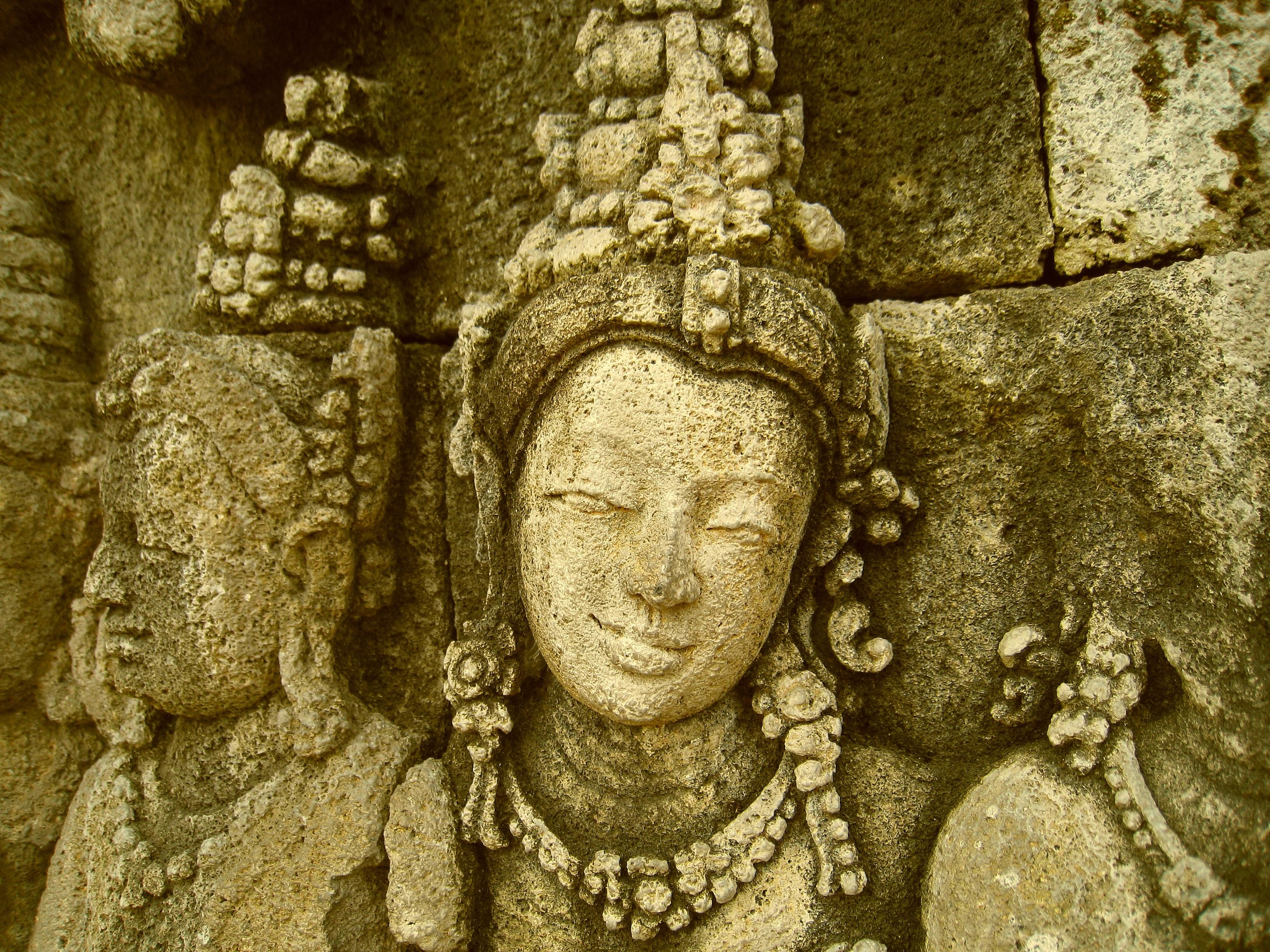
Lalitavistara bas-relief of Borobudur describing devas (gods) wearing jatamakuta delighted listening to dharma, 9th century Java.

The crown, in its various forms, originated as headdresses symbolizing the jaṭāmakuṭa, the matted hair of an ascetic formed into the shape of a crown, often found in the iconography of Shiva and Avalokiteśvara. By the turn of the 1st millennia, Hindu-Buddhists of Dharmic civilization emanating from the Indian subcontinent were absorbed and adopted by Indianized Kingdoms in Southeast Asia; from Mekong delta to coastal central Vietnam, from Java to Sumatra and Malay peninsula. Subsequently, the Sanskritization took place in Southeast Asia, hand in hand with the adoption of the Hindu-Buddhist concept of kingship. Numbers of Sanskrit terms find their way into local languages in the region. The Pali/ Sanskrit word makuṭa was faithfully adopted as makuta within Javanese and Balinese language to describe royal crown, and rendered as Jawi: مهکوتا and mahkota in Malay and Indonesian. The Khmer mokot (មកុដ), Burmese magaik (မကိုဋ်) and Thai mongkut (มงกุฎ) are derived from the same word too. While the Thai chada (ชฎา) is derived from Pali/Sanskrit jaṭā.

== Variants ==
=== Cambodia ===
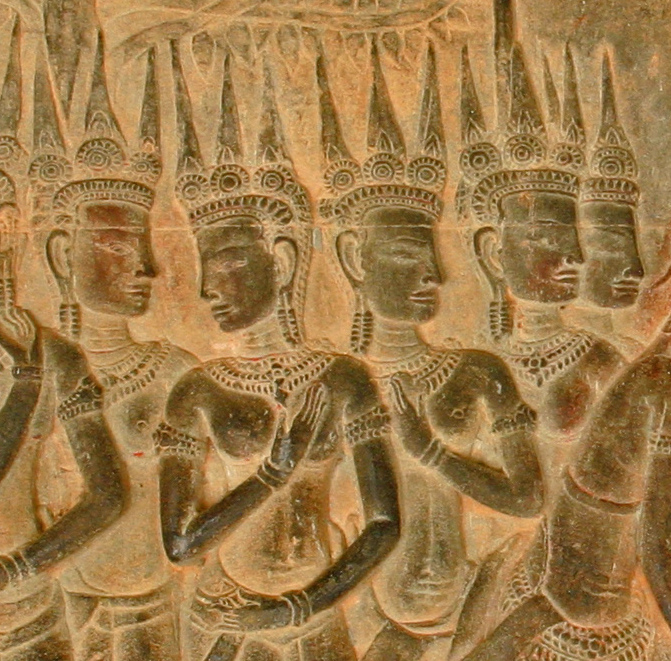
Group of female figures with Apsara crown in side view mokot depicted on the southern gallery of the 12th-century temple of Angkor Wat.

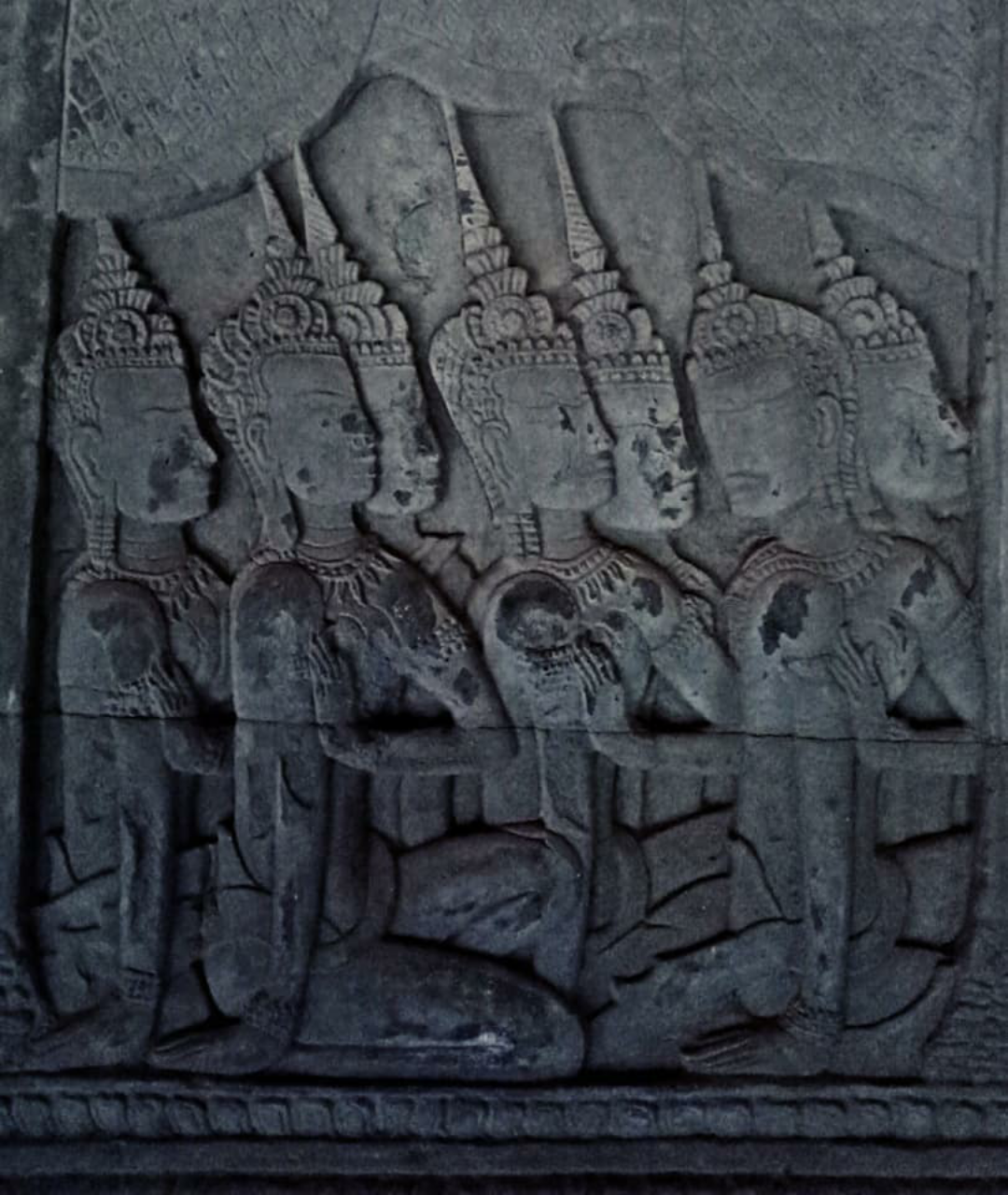
Group of siting female figures with tall single-spire crown depicted on the southern gallery of the 12th century temple of Angkor Wat.

There are many types of mokot used in Cambodian tradition throughout its history. Most of mokot used for the Hindu deities and kings who embraced Hinduism represented Mount Meru or Prang whereas for Buddhists, mokot is taller with single-spire presenting chedi (Buddhist stupa). In Royal Ballet of Cambodia, the crown worn by a male royal character of the highest rank is called a mokot ksat and a mokot ksatrey for female characters.

=== Indonesia ===
Indonesia, especially Sumatra, Java, and Bali has adopted the Hindu-Buddhist concept of kingship as early as the 4th century CE. Thus the term makuta is loaned into Kawi language or Old Javanese that subsequently become the ancestor of modern Javanese and Balinese languages. In Sumatra, the Old Malay term also adopted makuta and in turn render to mahkota in modern Malay and Indonesian languages. The typical classical Javanese Hindu-Buddhist jatamakuta is evident in numbers of statues and bas-reliefs of 9th century candis in Java, such as Mendut, Borobudur and Prambanan. The Javanese makuta model is more faithfully modeled after the classic Indian crown, which consists of jamang or siger diadem or tiara worn on the forehead encircling the head, while the hair is arranged in a high bun, decorated with a golden ring securing the hair bun, and several golden ornaments.

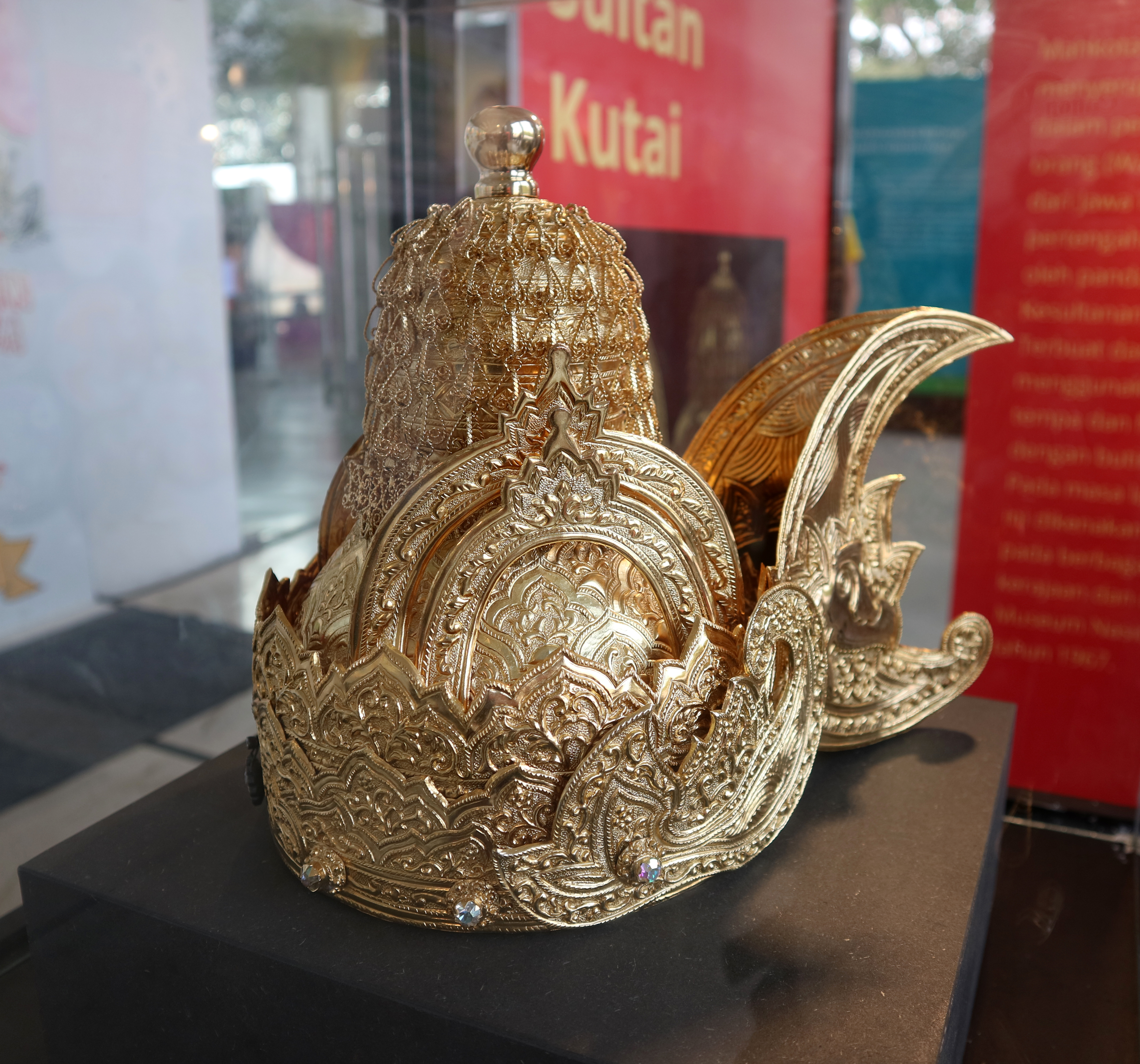
Mahkota Kutai, the golden crown of Kutai Kartanegara Sultanate modelled after Javanese makuta style.

The Javanese makuta crown is now used in traditional Wayang wong dance-drama performance. Balinese crown was also modeled after the crown of the Javanese style. The Makuta Binokasih Sanghyang Pake is the golden crown of classic Javanese makuta style, originally the crown of Sunda Kingdom and has become the regalia of Sumedang Larang kingdom. The royal crown of Kutai Kartanegara Sultanate was designed in the classical Javanese style, which resembles a king's crown in the Wayang wong (Wayang orang) performance in Java.

=== Malaysia ===
In Malaysia, the makuta crown is used in traditional Menora dance-drama, which is performed mainly in the northern states of Malaysia. The main Menora character, also known as the Menora, wore a makuta, a kind of high crown made of soft metal. In Malay, this kind of crown is called kecopong instead of the usual Malay word for crowns, mahkota. This makuta has 16 vertically rounded corners, with pom-poms, as well as pointed ears and decorative earrings.

=== Myanmar ===
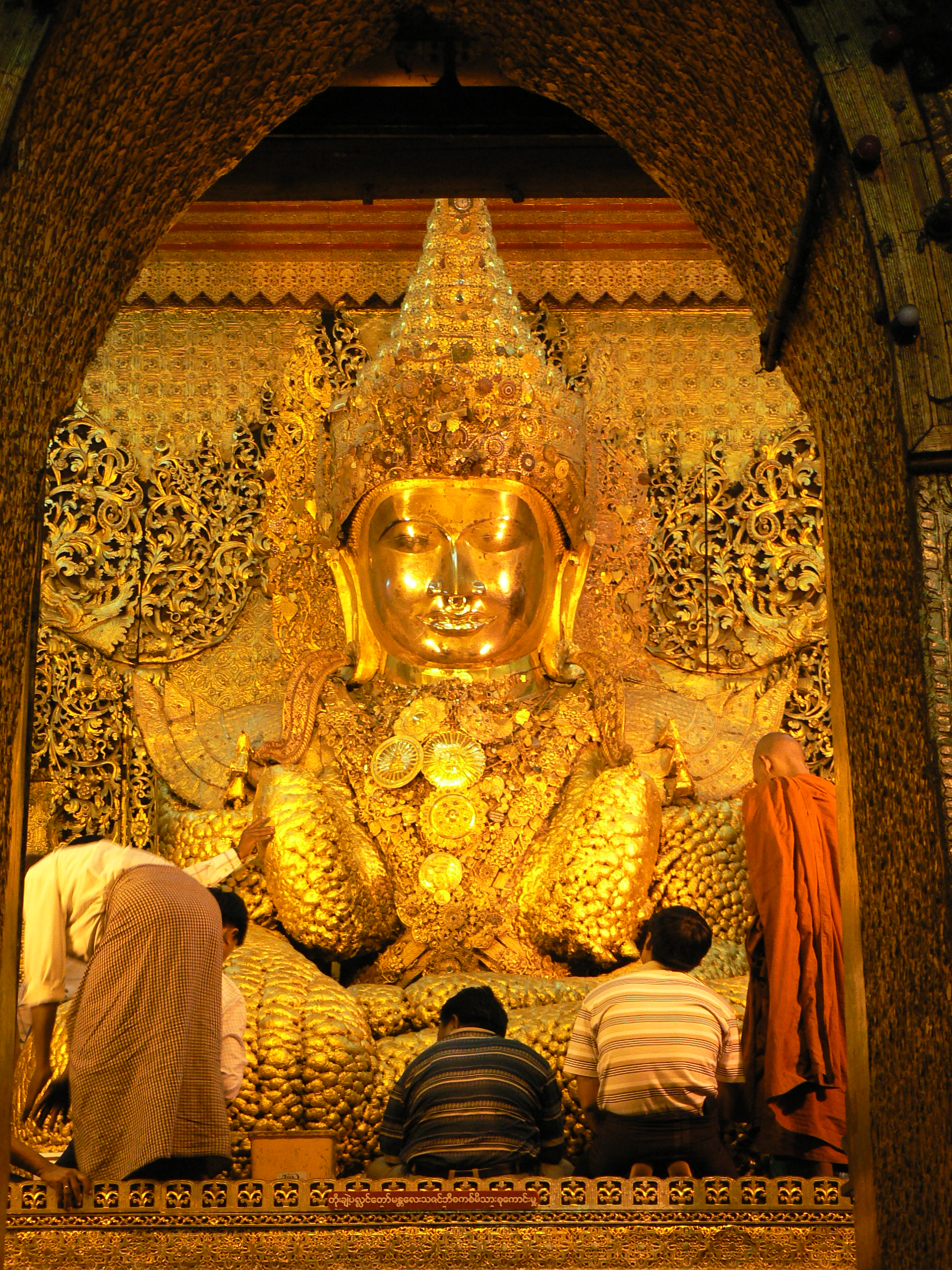
The Mahamuni Buddha image in Mandalay is crowned with a crested magaik bejewelled with diamonds, rubies and sapphires.

In pre-colonial Burmese kingdoms, the magaik was one of the five articles of palatial regalia used during coronation ceremonies. The magaik also crowns prominent images of the Buddha. The magaik form of the hti, an umbrella that crowns Burmese pagodas, has nine tiers. In modern-day Myanmar, the magaik is worn by dancers when performing classical forms of Burmese dance.

=== Thailand ===
In Thailand, the headdress is known by two names: chada and mongkut, and feature a distinctive tall, pointed shape, which was probably acquired from the lomphok, a pointed cloth headdress of Persian origin, during the Ayutthaya period. In the Thai classical dance traditions of khon and the various forms of lakhon, the chada is worn by male characters of royal status, while the mongkut is worn by females. There are many variants of chada and mongkut, reflecting the status of the wearer as well as the occasion. As a symbol of divinity, the mongkut often appears in the iconography of the Buddha and in artistic depictions of devata (divine beings). As a symbol of kingship, the Great Crown of Victory (Phra Maha Phichai Mongkut) forms part of the Regalia of Thailand.

=== Other traditions ===
Similar crowns are occasionally worn in the Champa apsara traditions dance, and are occasionally worn as part of festival garb.

== See also ==
- Tengkolok
- Salakot

== Gallery ==
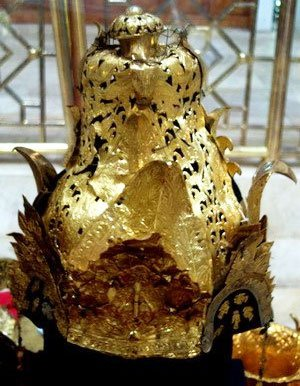
Makuta Binokasih Sanghyang Pake, the crown of Sunda Kingdom.

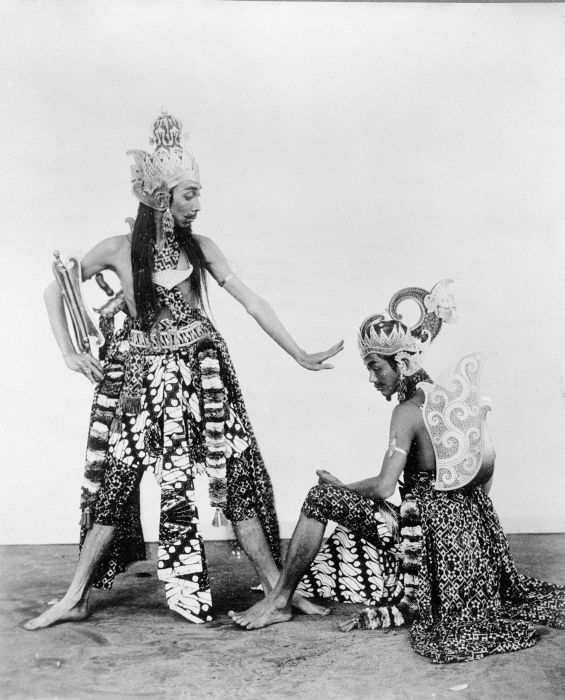
Wayang wong Javanese dance drama performer wearing typical Javanese makuta crown.

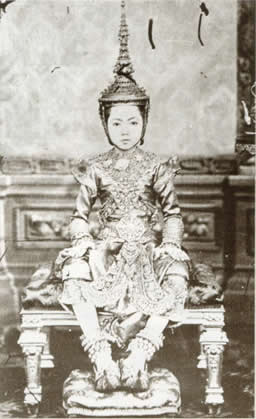
Princess Voralaksanavadi wearing a chada as a child.

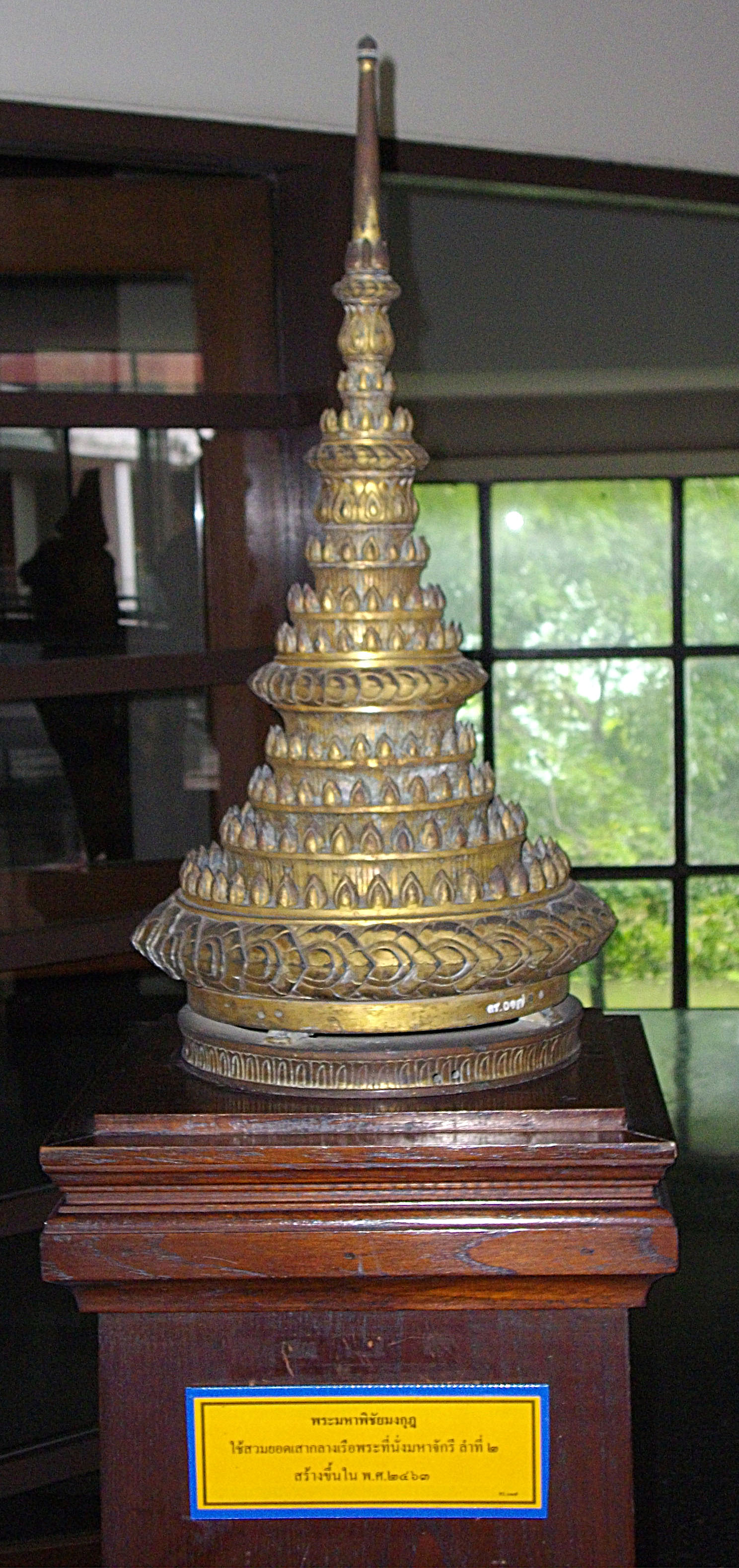
Replica of the Great Crown of Victory, Thailand.
