= Jikey =

Traditional Malay dance drama

- Native name: Jikey
- Origin: Malaysia

Jikey (Jawi: جيكيي) is a traditional Malay dance drama that is popular in Kedah and Perlis, Malaysia. The dance drama is known as Yike in Cambodia and Likay in Thailand. It is also popular in southern provinces of Satun and Phuket.

== History ==
It is believed to have originated from the singing of zikir among the Malays, before it developed into a secular theatre after the late 19th century. The Jikey performance also has strong influence from other Malay performing arts like Mak Yong, Hadrah, Bangsawan and Mek Mulung.

== Description ==
The main elements of Jikey are improvised dialogue, music and dance, and local legends formed the main repertoire with considerable emphasis placed on slapstick comedy. The Jikey music consists of both instrumental and singing. The main characters are comedians, kings and warriors, and a form of leitmotif is involved as various characters in the drama are identified with specific elements in the music.

A complete theatrical orchestra for Jikey includes rebana (with no jingles) in large, medium and small sizes; one tambourine; one hanging, knobbed gong, five or more pairs of cerek, one pair of kesi, an oboe (serunai for Malay or pi for Thai). However, typical ensembles consists only of a violin, 3 rebana and 2 cerek or bamboo stampers.
