= Respoken =

Cambodian Short Documentary

- Directed by: Sidney Ken; Thaiphirun Hul
- Produced by: Kimkahaptei Tann
- Starring: Phearith Nen; Sopheak Soung
- Edited by: Sidney Ken; Chandara Koam
- Release date: 2024
- Running time: 26 minutes
- Country: Cambodia
- Language: Khmer

Respoken (និយាយឡើងវិញ) is a 2024 Cambodian Khmer language short documentary directed by Sidney Ken and Thai Phirun Hul. The film addresses Cambodian modern "Spoken theater" (Lakhon Niyeay).

It won the Best Documentary Award at the 4th Cambodia National Short Film Festival, in November 2024, and the awards for Best Short Film Director(s) and Best Short Film at the 3rd Cambodia Asian Film Festival, in September 2025.

The film premiered at the 13th Chaktomuk Short Film Festival in October 2024. It was also screened at the 14th Cambodia International Film Festival in March 2025.

== Content ==
The film introduces Cambodian artists who have been struggling to bring Cambodia's Lakhon Niyeay (Spoken Theater) back to its glory days. The main storyline follows Nen Phearith, leader of the playgroup "EsaiVoler", in the process of trying to organize their upcoming performance of "Kolab Pailin" amidst low ticket sales. Featured interviewees include Soung Sopheak, Seng Ponrong, Chan Sreyleak, and Chhon Syna, who discuss their individual efforts in preserving Lakhon Noyeay, as well as their concerns about this dwindling art form.

== Cast ==
- Phearith Nen
- Sopheak Soung
- Ponrong Seng
- Sreyleak Chan
- Syna Chhon

== Reception ==
In a review for Film Threat, Ken Hill wrote: "the heart and soul of this short but potent film, Sreyleak Chan, exposes the cost, both financial and emotional, yet he is never deterred nor seems afraid. It is a fascinating portrait of the courage it takes to live a dream in a reality that only wants to keep us marching to the beat of the times. Respoken cries out against the death of art and culture. It rages spectacularly against the dying of the light."

A review by Panos Kotzathanasis in Asian Movie Pulse stated: "Some additional context about how spoken theater differs from conventional stage performance would have been welcome, and the integration of different footage could have been slightly more cohesive. Nevertheless, the result succeeds in highlighting a disappearing art form and the efforts of the people striving to keep it alive."

== Accolades ==
Festival	Date of ceremony	Category	Recipient(s)	Result	Ref.
13th Chaktomuk Short Film Festival	26 October 2024	Documentary Showcase	Respoken	Nominated	
4th Cambodia National Short Film Festival	30 November 2024	Best Documentary	Respoken	Won	
14th Cambodia International Film Festival	21 March 2025	Glimpse of Cambodia Showcase	Respoken	Nominated	
3rd Cambodia Asian Film Festival	6 September 2025	Best Short Film Director(s)	Sidney Ken, Thai Phirun Hul	Won	
3rd Cambodia Asian Film Festival	6 September 2025	Best Short Film	Respoken	Won	
