= Lkhon pol srey =

Lakhon pol srey (Khmer: ល្ខោនពោលស្រី, lit. 'female narrative theatre') is a dance drama genre originating from the court of Oudong in Cambodia during the 17th century. The performance consists of masked female dancers enacting the Reamker. It is distinct from the lakhon khol genre in that the narration is performed by the dancers themselves. There now exists only one troupe located at Wat Kean Svay Krau in Cambodia.

== See also ==
- Lakhon khol
- Royal Ballet of Cambodia
- Dance of Cambodia
- Theatre of Cambodia
