= Dabus (dance) =

Malay dance

Dabus dance
- Native name: Tarian Dabus
- Origin: Perak, Malaysia

Dabus is a warrior dance from the Malaysian state of Perak. This warrior dance, as such, is characteristically heroic, demanding performers to exhibits traits of intelligence, dexterity, heroism, and cheerfulness when performing. Dabus is one of the traditional dances of Perak that has survived some 300 years. There are conflicting theories on the origin of Dabus, with some historians claiming that it was brought over from Aceh, while other historians believe it to have been brought over from Baghdad during the 18th century.

== Origins ==
The dance is believed to have originated as a pastime during the time of the Islamic prophet Muhammad. It may have been performed to train and prepare soldiers for religious battles, invoking spiritual power to perform their noble task and demonstrating their fearlessness and bravery in battle.

There are some opinions that dispute the entry of dabus dance into Perak. One opinion says that dabus is believed to have been brought directly to Perak by Ahmad Mahyuddin who is from Persia (Baghdad) around 1785. He was a student of the teacher Muhammad Abil Hassan al-Rifai. This dance began to develop in Pasir Panjang Laut, Sitiawan, Lumut, and also in Sungai Nipah Baroh and Sungai Balai Baroh, Teluk Intan, Perak.

The second opinion said dabus game was brought to Indonesia through Pasai in Aceh before developed to Pasir Panjang, Perak by Nakhoda Lembang who studied Lembang Fakir Muhammad of India, who was also a pupil of the master Muhammad Abil Hassan al-Rifai. Another opinion says Ahmad Mahyuddin who studied with Muhammad Abil Hassan al-Rifai met with Nakhoda Lembang of Batu Bara, Aceh who studied with Fakir Muhammad of India in 1785, has been jointly developing the arts dabus to Perak in Pasir Panjang in early 1700.

== Performance ==
Tarian Dabus is performed by singers and a troupe of dancers. The singers chant religious songs of praise, the chanting is accompanied by a rebana. Performances are usually presided over by a Khalifah.

== See also ==
- Malay dance
