= Khon =

Thai masked dance drama

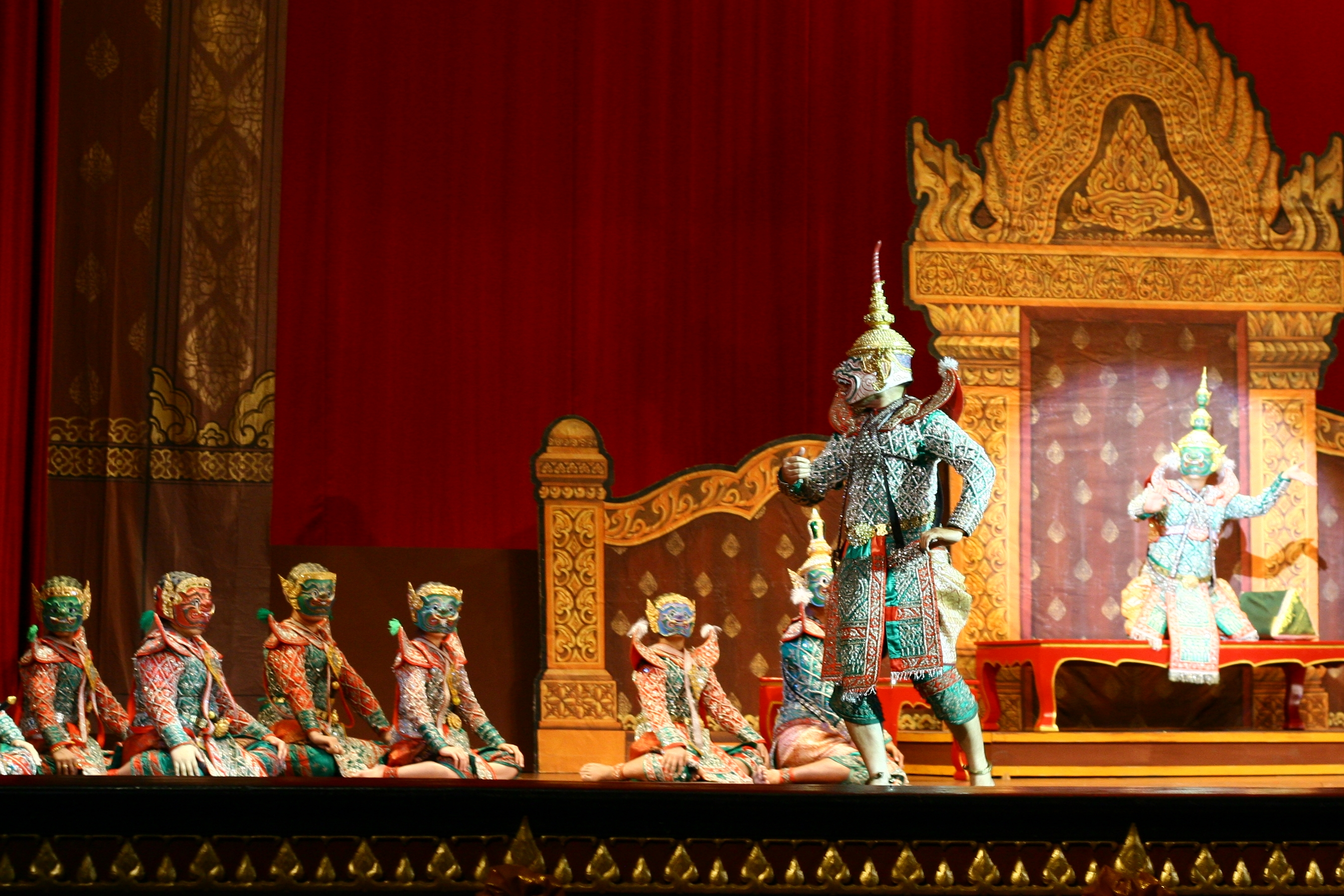
- Khon performance at Thammasat University
- Medium: Dance drama theatre
- Originating culture: Thai
- Originating era: Ayutthaya Kingdom

Khon, masked dance drama in Thailand
- UNESCO Intangible Cultural Heritage
- Country: Thailand
- Reference: 01385
- Region: Asia and the Pacific

Inscription history
- Inscription: 2018 (13th session)
- List: Representative

Khon (Thai: โขน, pronounced [kʰǒːn]) is a dance drama genre from Thailand. Khon has been performed since the Ayutthaya Kingdom. Born from the harmonious blend of traditional Thai performing arts, Khon has flourished into a distinctive cultural treasure of Thailand.

It is traditionally performed solely in the royal court by men in masks accompanied by narrators and a traditional piphat ensemble. A variation of this genre with female performers is called khon phu ying (โขนผู้หญิง).

== History ==
Khon is a Thai traditional dance which combines many arts like dance and drama. The provenance of Khon was based on Ramayana and later developed to Ramakien in the Thai style. Moreover it is mentioned in Thai literature's Lilit Phra Lo (c. 1529) which was written before the reign of King Narai.

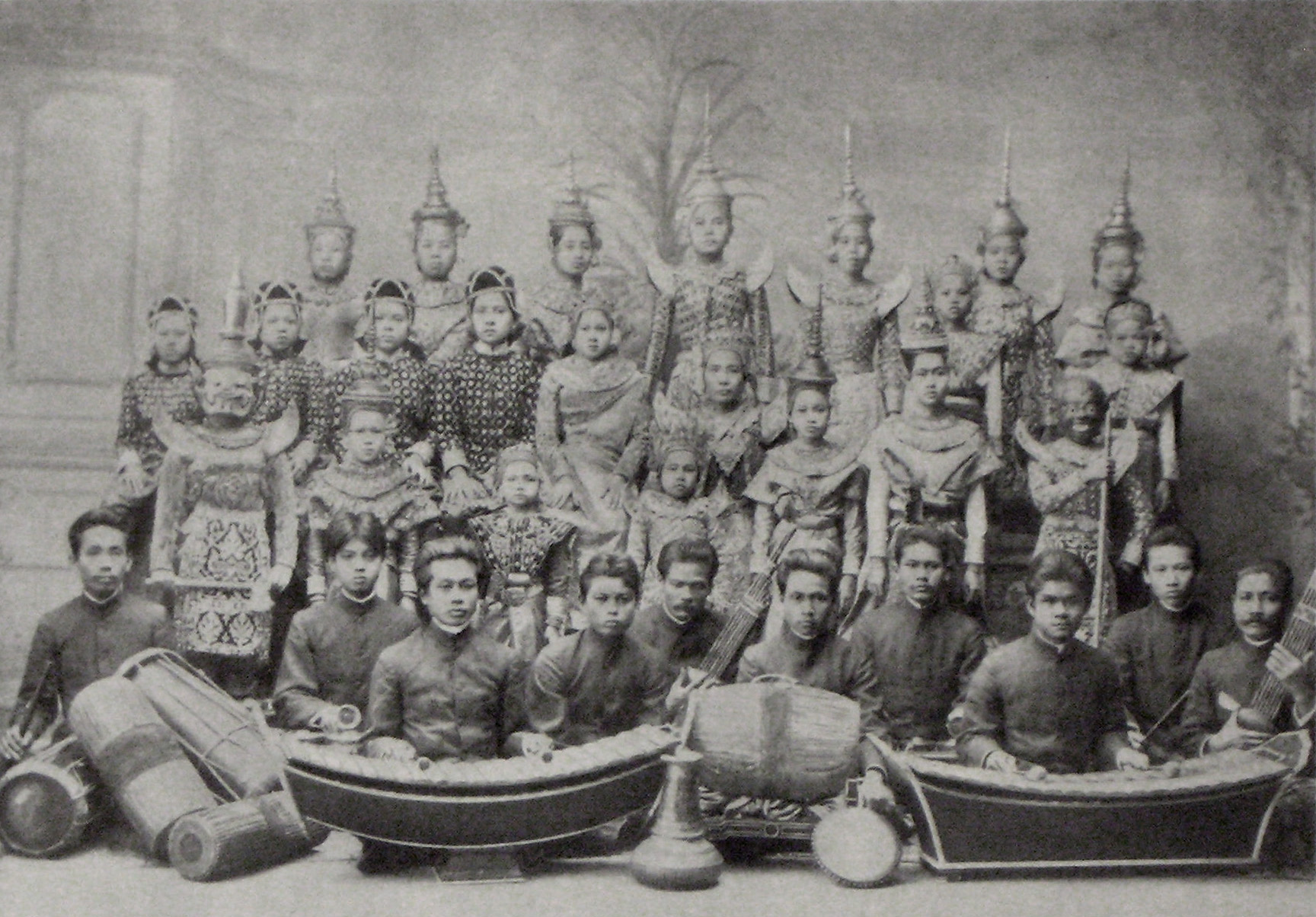
A theater group from Bangkok performed in Berlin, 1900

Historical evidence shows that the Thai art of stage plays must have already been highly evolved by the 17th century. In 1687, King Louis XIV of France sent a diplomat Simon de la Loubère to record all that he saw in the Ayutthaya Kingdom. In his famous account Du Royaume de Siam, La Loubère carefully observed the classic 17th century theatre of Siam, including an epic battle scene from a Khon performance, and recorded what he saw in great detail:

The Siamese have three sorts of Stage Plays: That which they call Cone [khôn] is a figure dance, to the sound of the violin and some other instruments. The dancers are masked and armed, and represent rather a combat than a dance. And though every one runs into high motions, and extravagant postures, they cease not continually to intermix some word. Most of their masks are hideous, and represent either monstrous Beasts, or kinds of Devils. The Show which they call Lacone is a poem intermix with Epic and Dramatic, which lasts three days, from eight in the morning till seven at night. They are histories in verse, serious, and sung by several actors always present, and which do only sing reciprocally .... The Rabam is a double dance of men and women, which is not martial, but gallant ... they can perform it without much tying themselves, because their way of dancing is a simple march round, very slow, and without any high motion; but with a great many slow contortions of the body and arms.

Of the attire of Siamese Khôn dancers, La Loubère recorded that, "[T]hose that dance in Rabam, and Cone, have gilded paper-bonnets, high and pointed, like the Mandarins caps of ceremony, but which hang down at the sides below their ears, which are adorned with counterfeit stones, and with two pendants of gilded wood."

The origin of Khon is hinted at by the origin of the word "Khon". Its origin is not precisely known, but there are four possibilities. First, "Khon" in Benguela Kalinin appears in the words "kora" or "Khon" which is the name of a musical instrument made of Hindi leather. Its appearance and shape are similar to the drum. It was popular and used for local traditional performances. It was assumed that kora was one of the instruments used in Khon performances. In the Tamil language "Khon" derives from the word "koll" which is close to "goll" or "golumn" in Tamil. These Tamil words relate to dressing or decorating the body from head to toe as in the use of Khon costumes. "Khon" in Iran was derived from the words "zurat khan" which means 'handed-doll' or 'puppet', used in local performances. Its songs were similar to current Khon.

== Characters ==
Khon roles are dictated by long-standing tradition. The principal characters are the heroes, the heroines, the ogres, and the monkeys. The monkeys are some of the most important roles in Khon. The best-known monkey characters in the story is the monkey warrior Hanuman.

Modern Khon contains many elements from the lakhon nai and today, includes female performers playing female characters, formerly performed by men. While the ogre and monkey characters wear masks, most of the human characters do not.

=== Khon language ===
Khon language is the use of various dance and gesture movements by performers to convey their roles to the audience and to create enjoyment. In general, Khon language resembles everyday language, but it cannot be expressed through vocal tones. Instead, it employs bodily gestures and movements using the torso, hands, arms, legs, feet, shoulders, neck, face, and head to represent meaning. Some gestures in Khon can communicate meaning even more effectively than spoken words. For example, shaking the head is used to signify refusal.

== Performances ==
Khon is based on the tales of the epic Ramakien (Thai adaptation of Indian Hindu epic Ramayana), as Thai literature and drama draws great inspiration from Indian arts and legend. Khon Ramakien originally could be performed by men only. Women performed only as angels and goddesses. Today women perform as monkeys and demons. In the past, Khon was performed only by the royal family, with the sons of the king performing as monkeys and demons. Thai Khon stresses realistic dance moves, especially the monkey, which focuses on beauty and fine monkey-like dancing postures. Khon training is begun at a very young age, so that the performer can become flexible enough to do back flips, especially by the Vanara (forest dwellers or monkey) character.

== Gallery ==
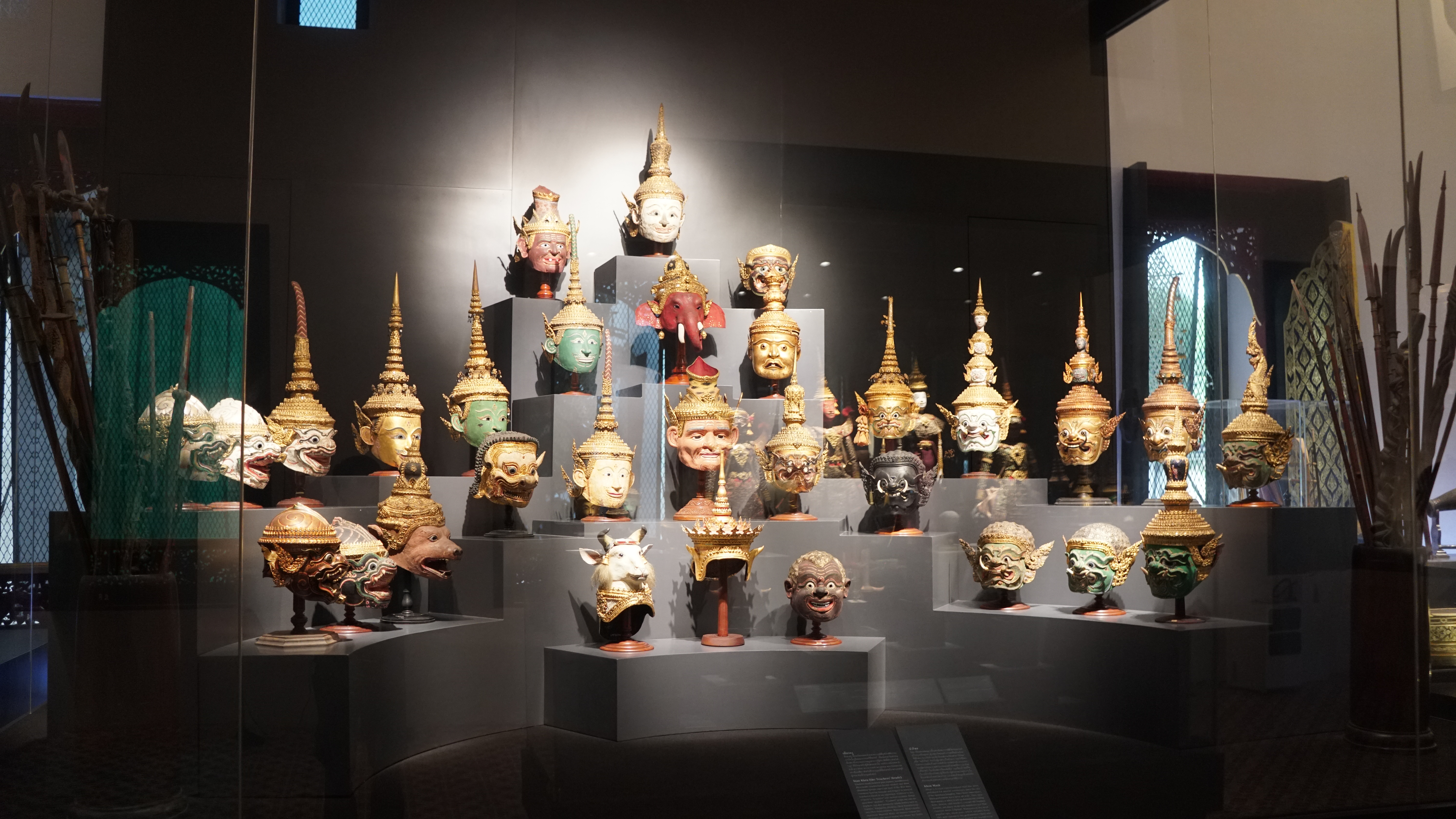
Ancient Khon masks in Bangkok National Museum

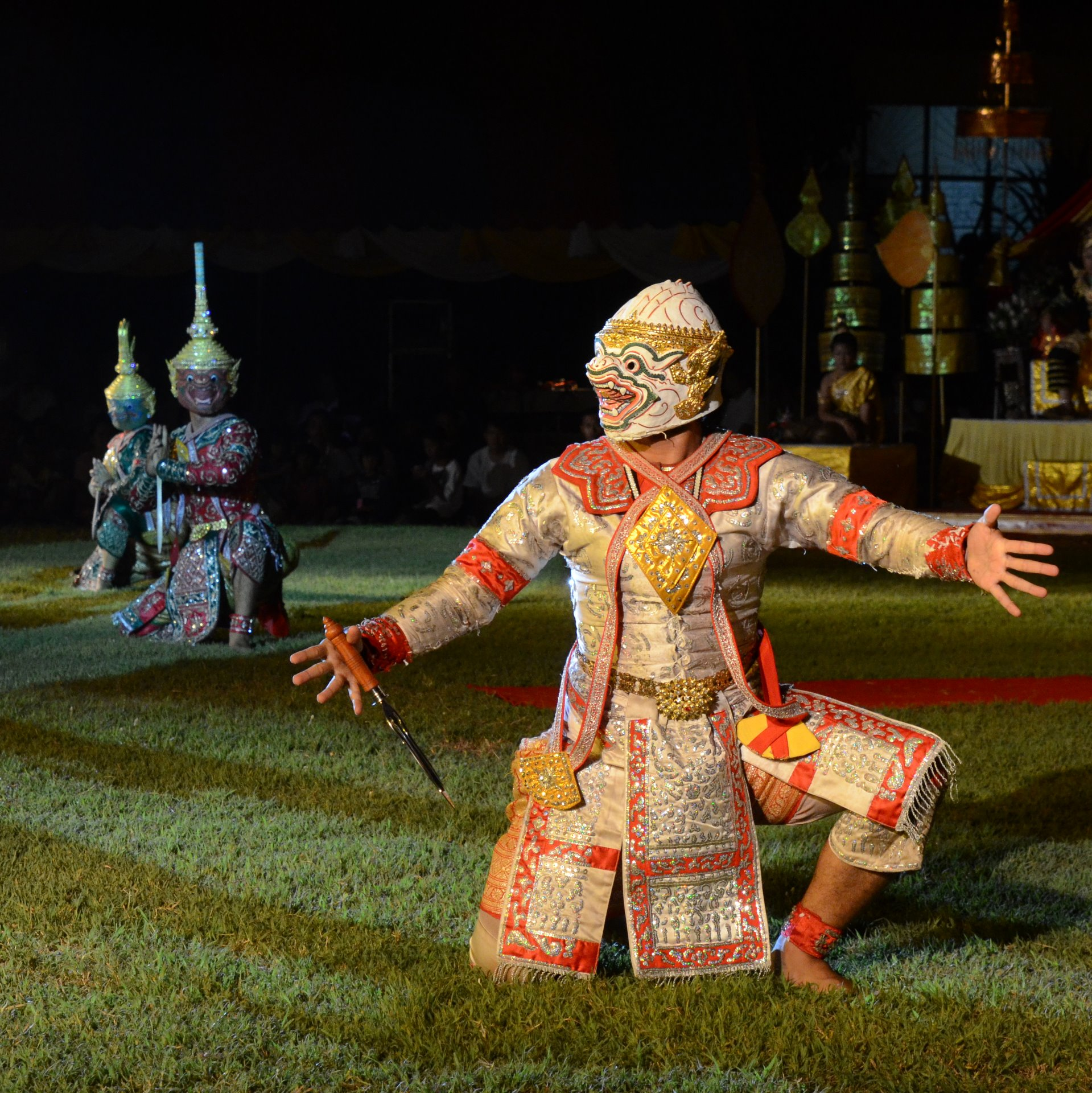
Khon performance at Atthami Bucha Festival in Wat Phra Borom That Thung Yang, Uttaradit province

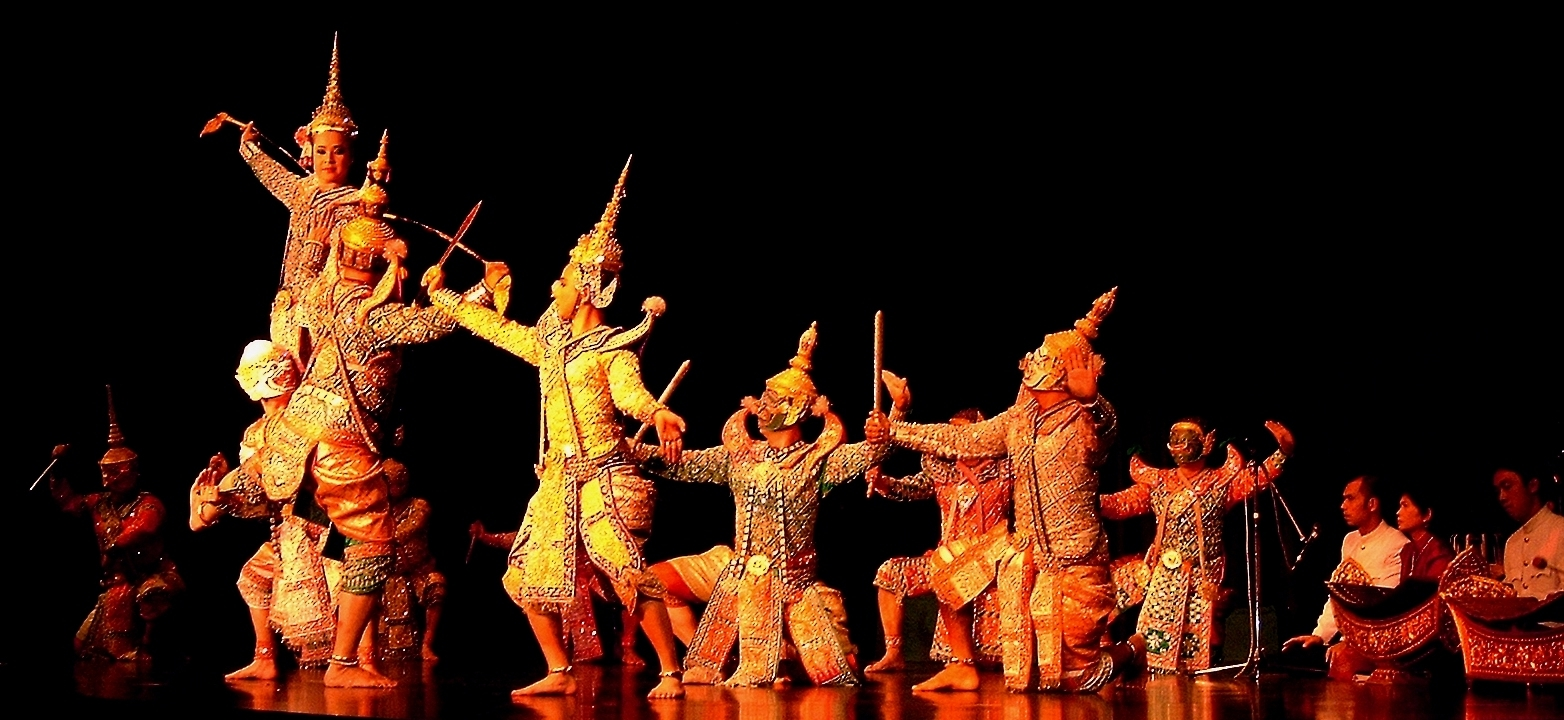
Khon performance at Frankfurt and Mainz, Germany

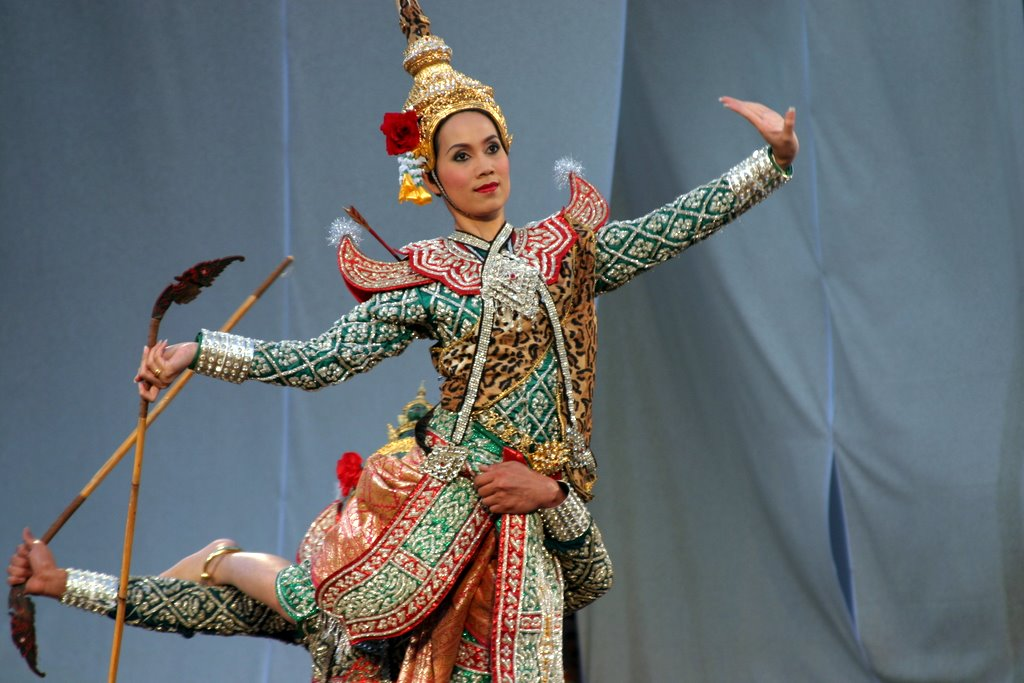
Khon performance at Hahoe Folk Village in Andong, North Gyeongsang Province, South Korea

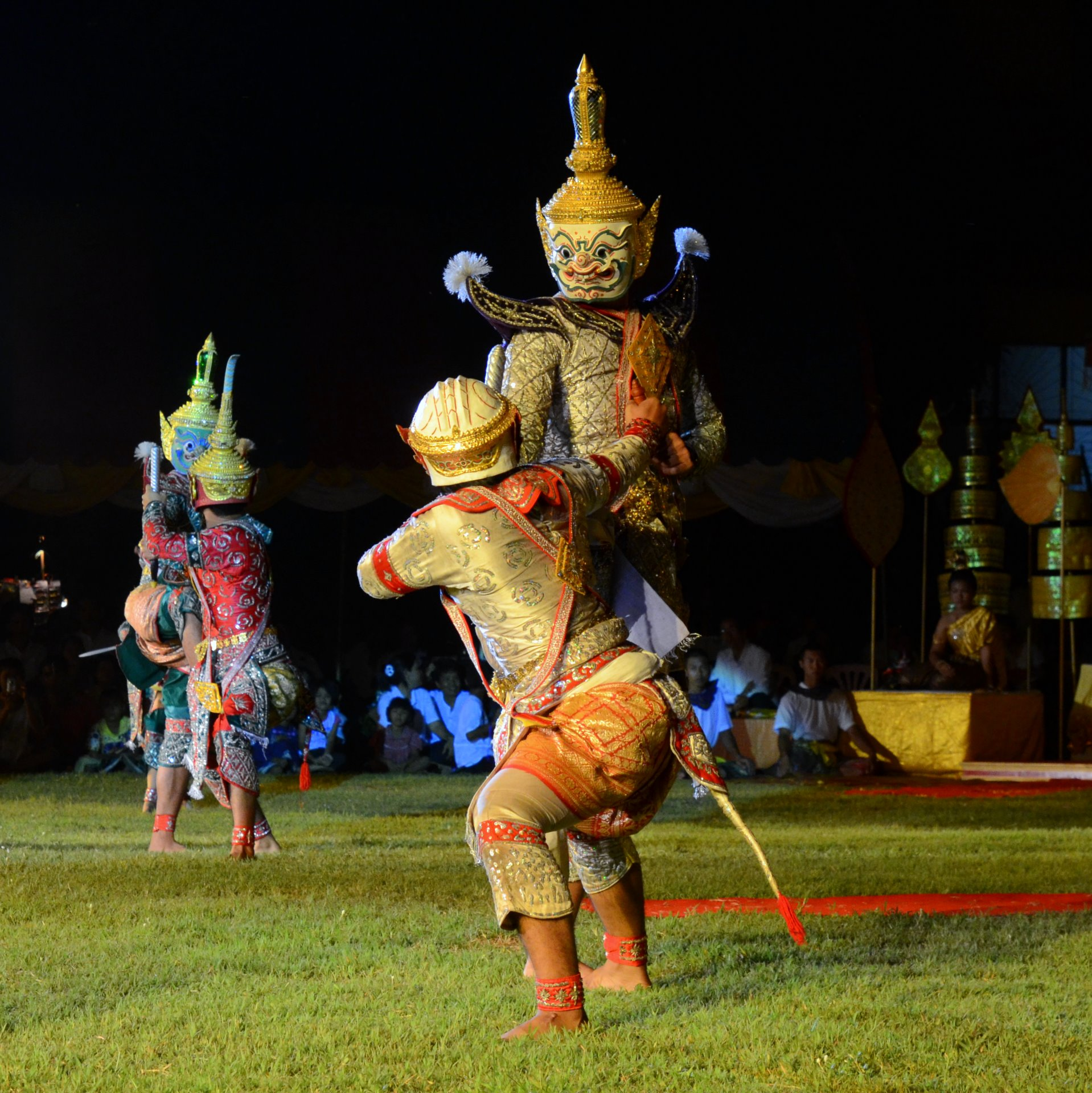
Khon performance at Atthami Bucha Festival in Wat Phra Borom That Thung Yang, Uttaradit province

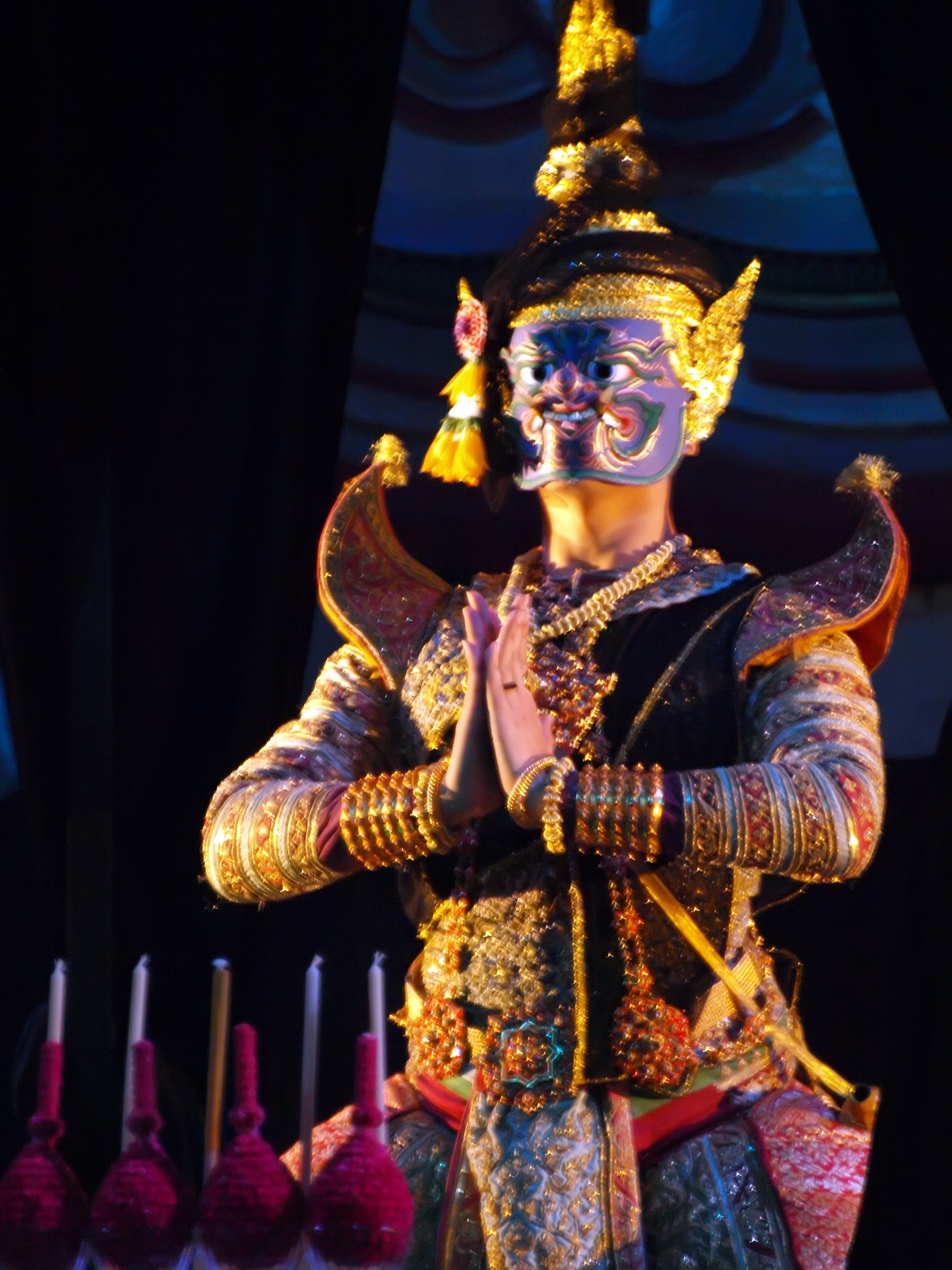
The Khon Masked Play "The Battle of Maiyarap" at the main hall, Thailand Cultural Centre

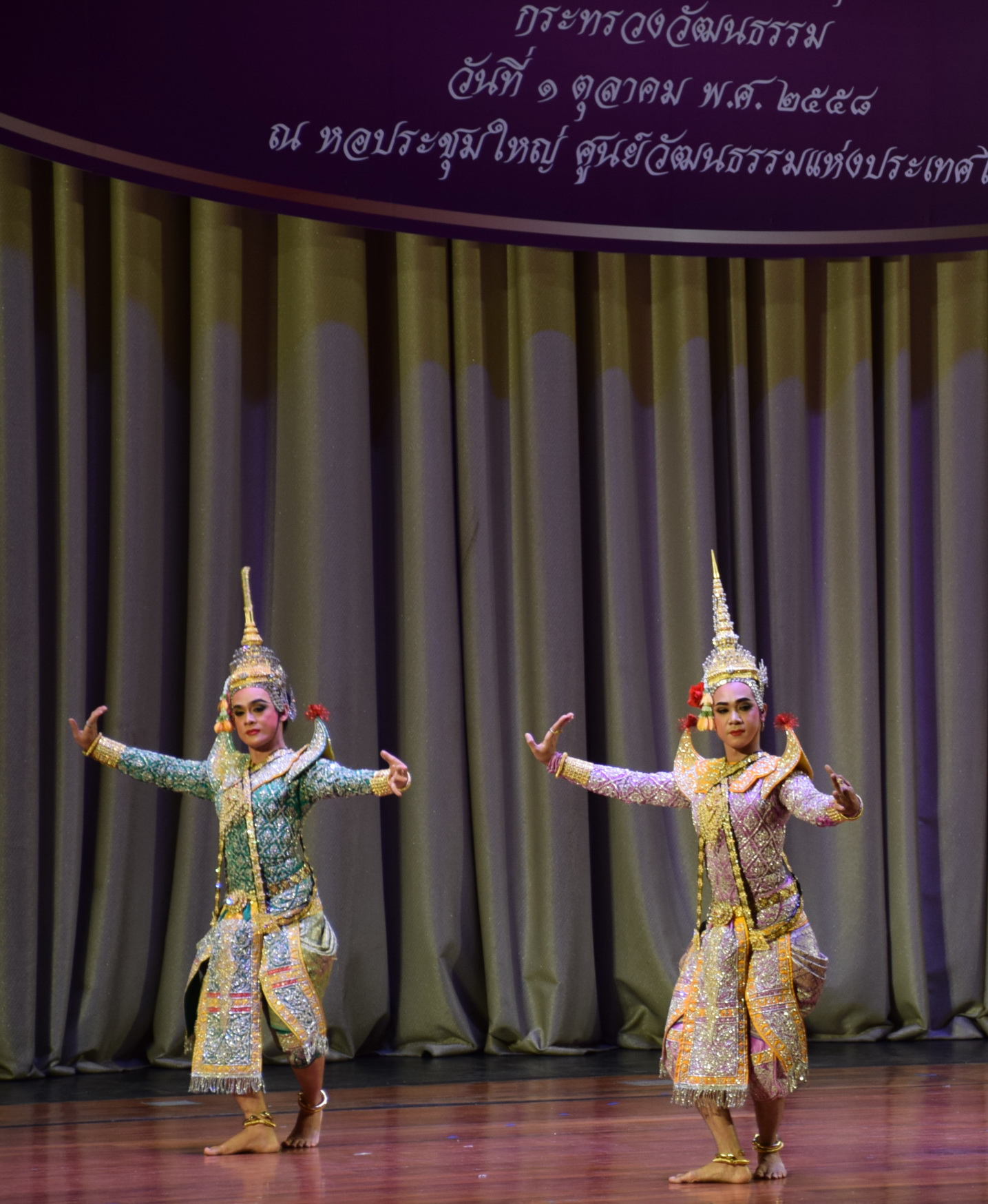
Khon performance at the main hall, Thailand Cultural Centre

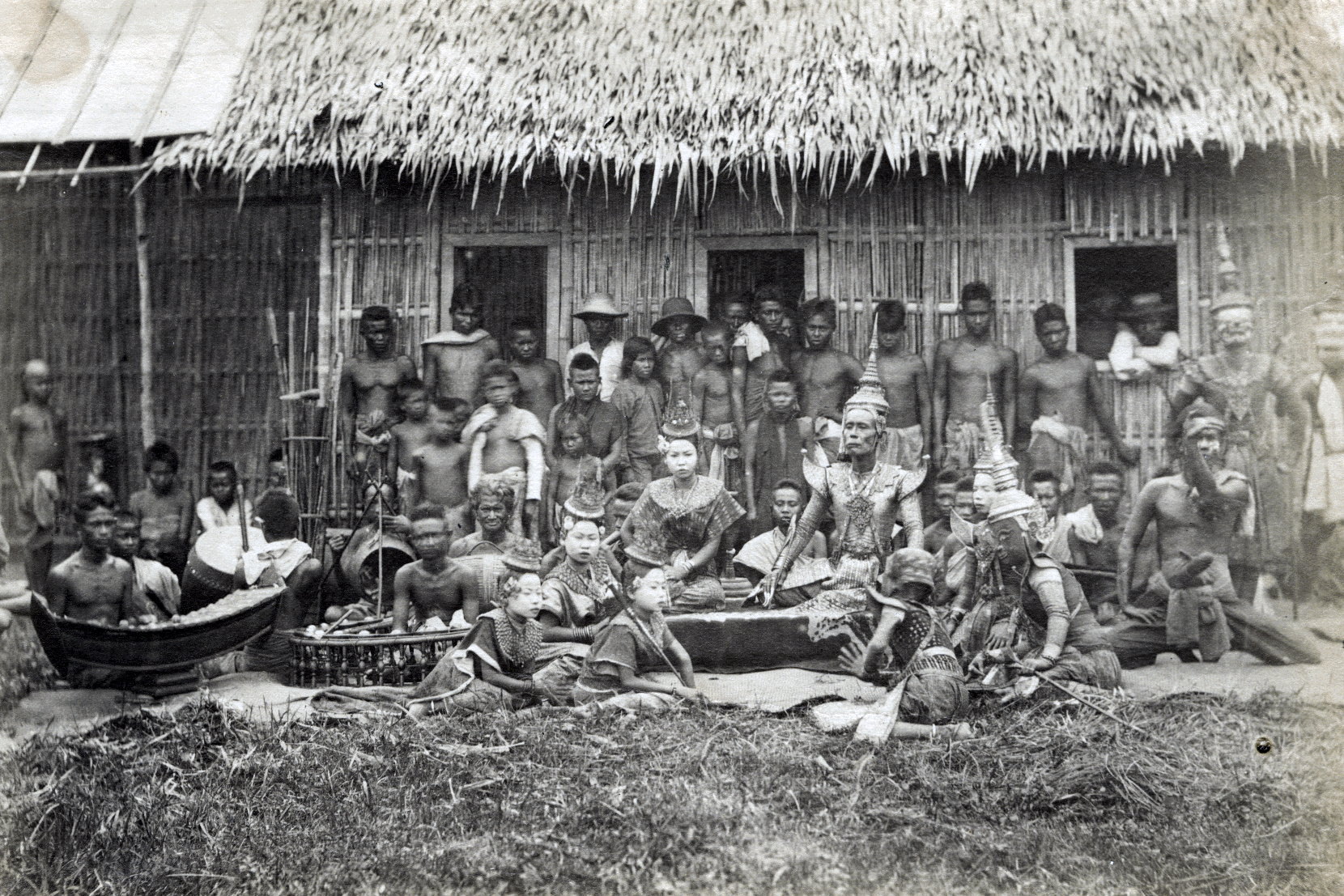
Cast members of Thai Khon, 1900

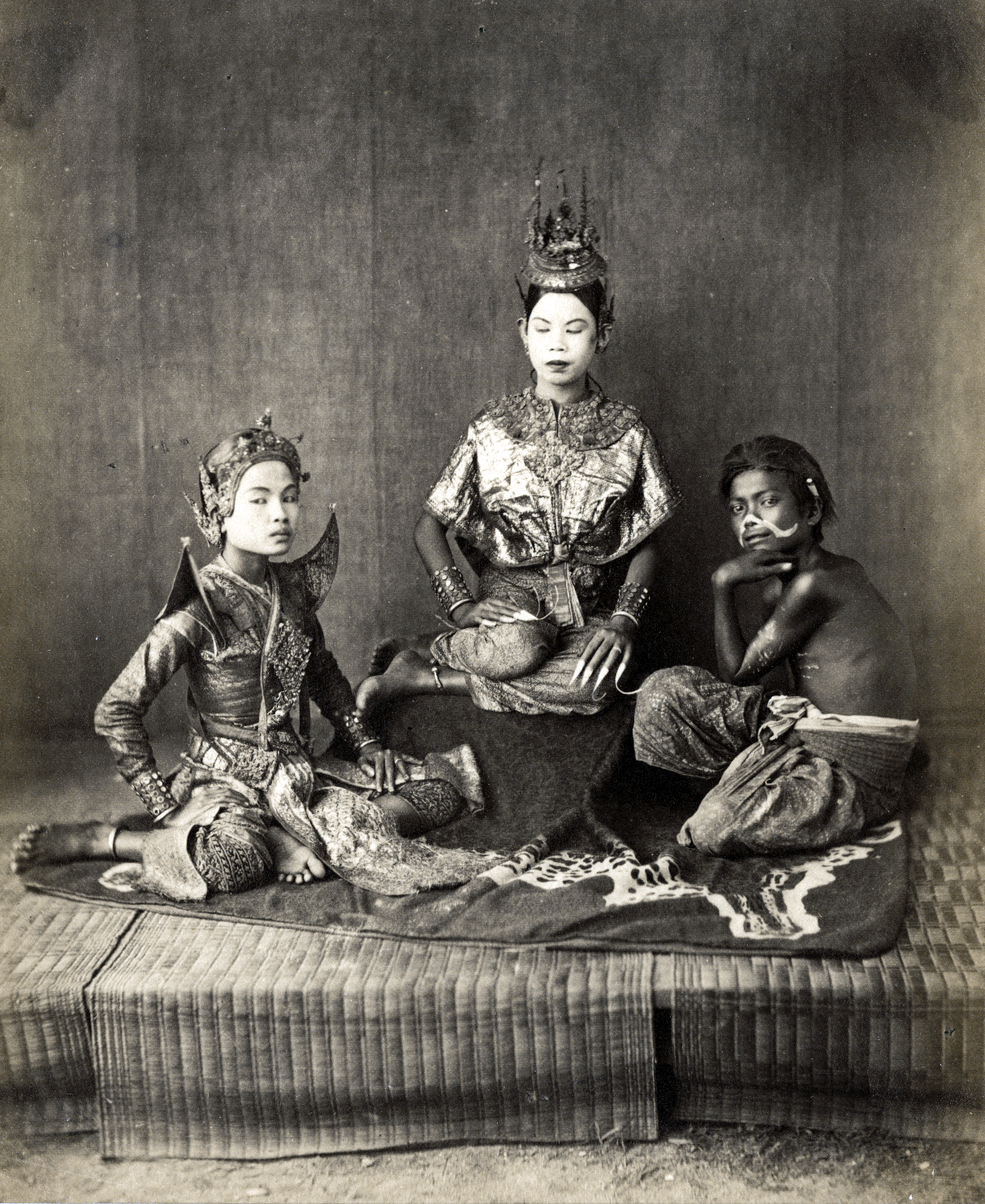
Khon actors representing a Princess, 1900

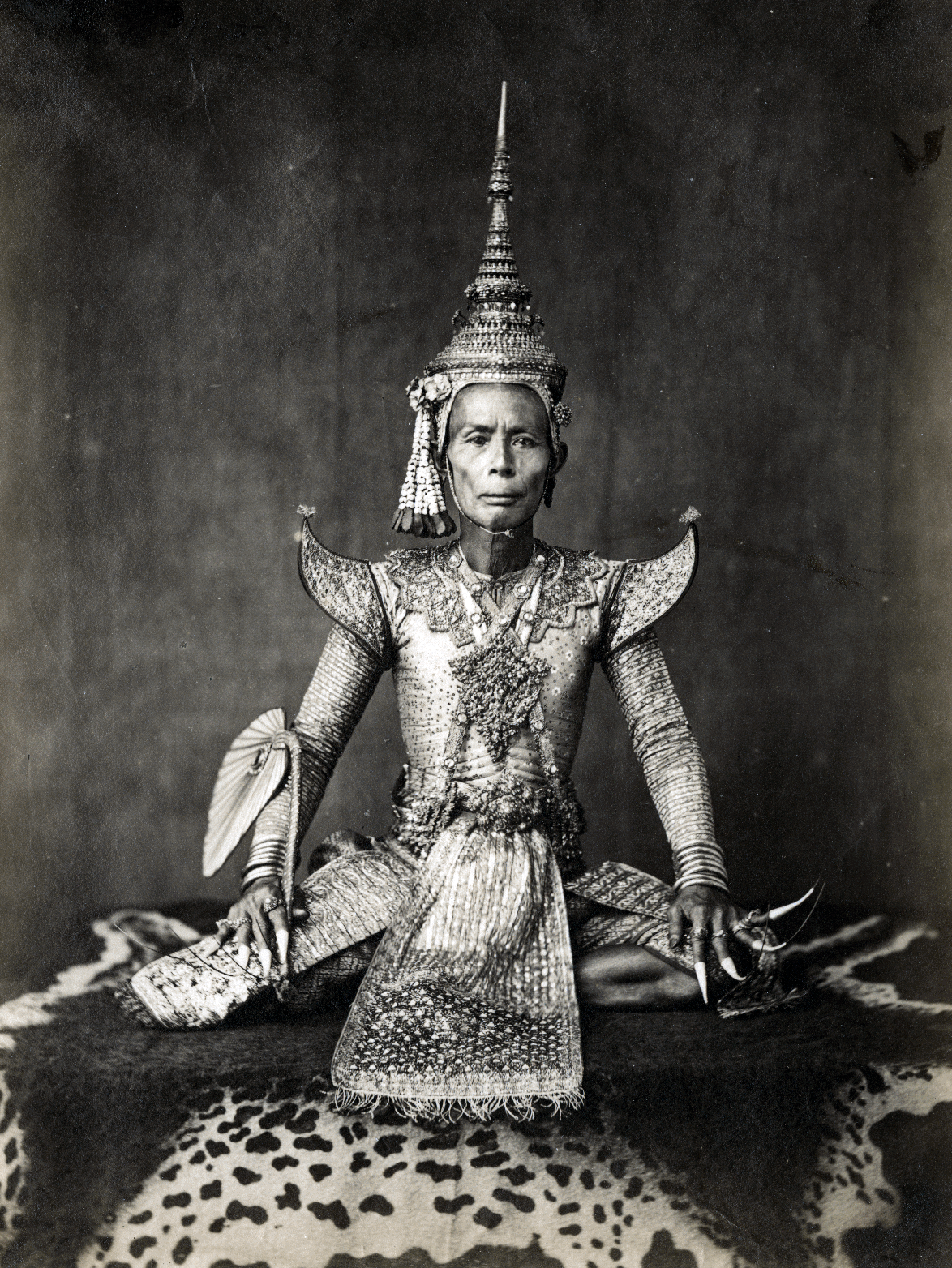
Khon actor as a Prince, 1900

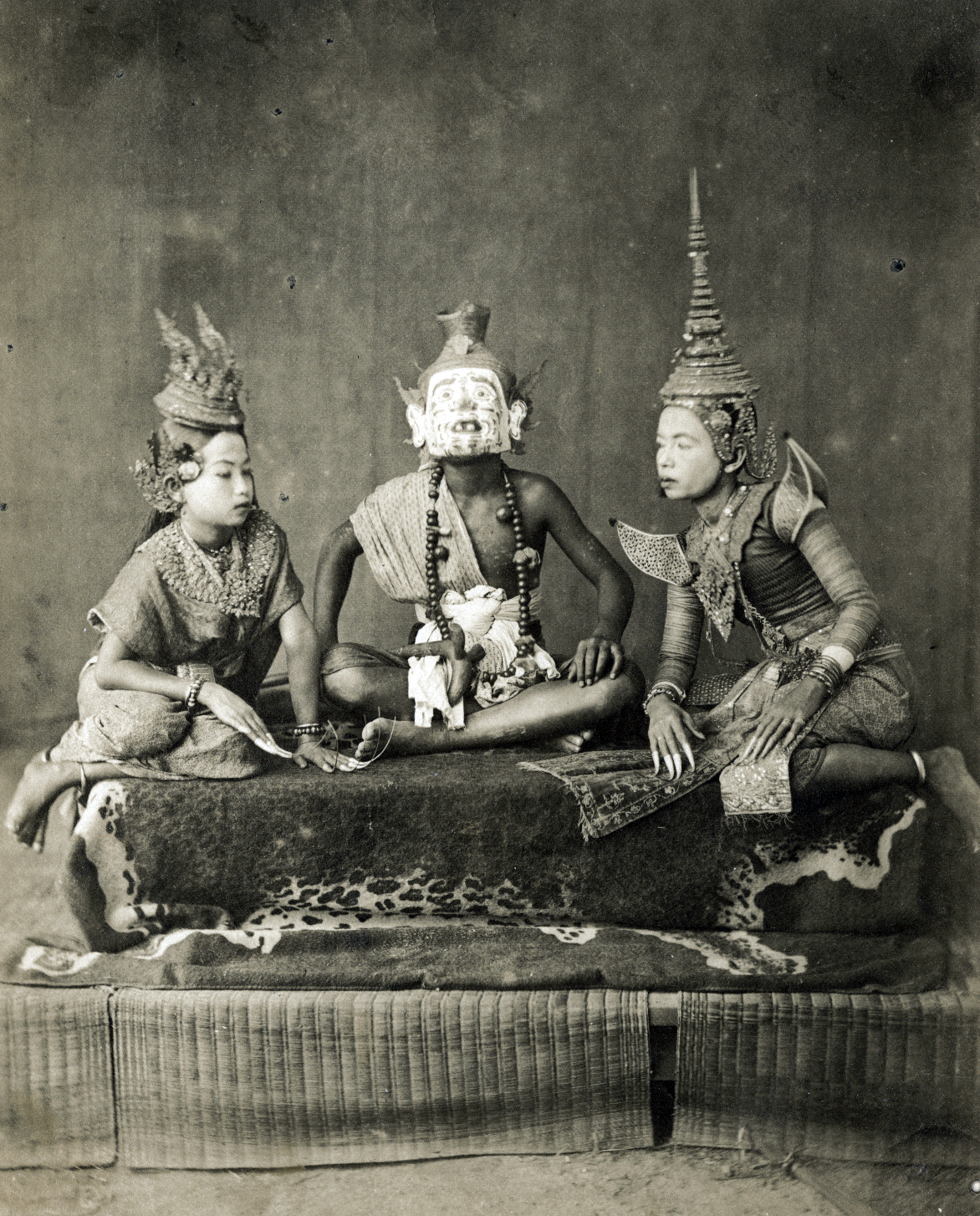
Khon actors rehearse, 1900

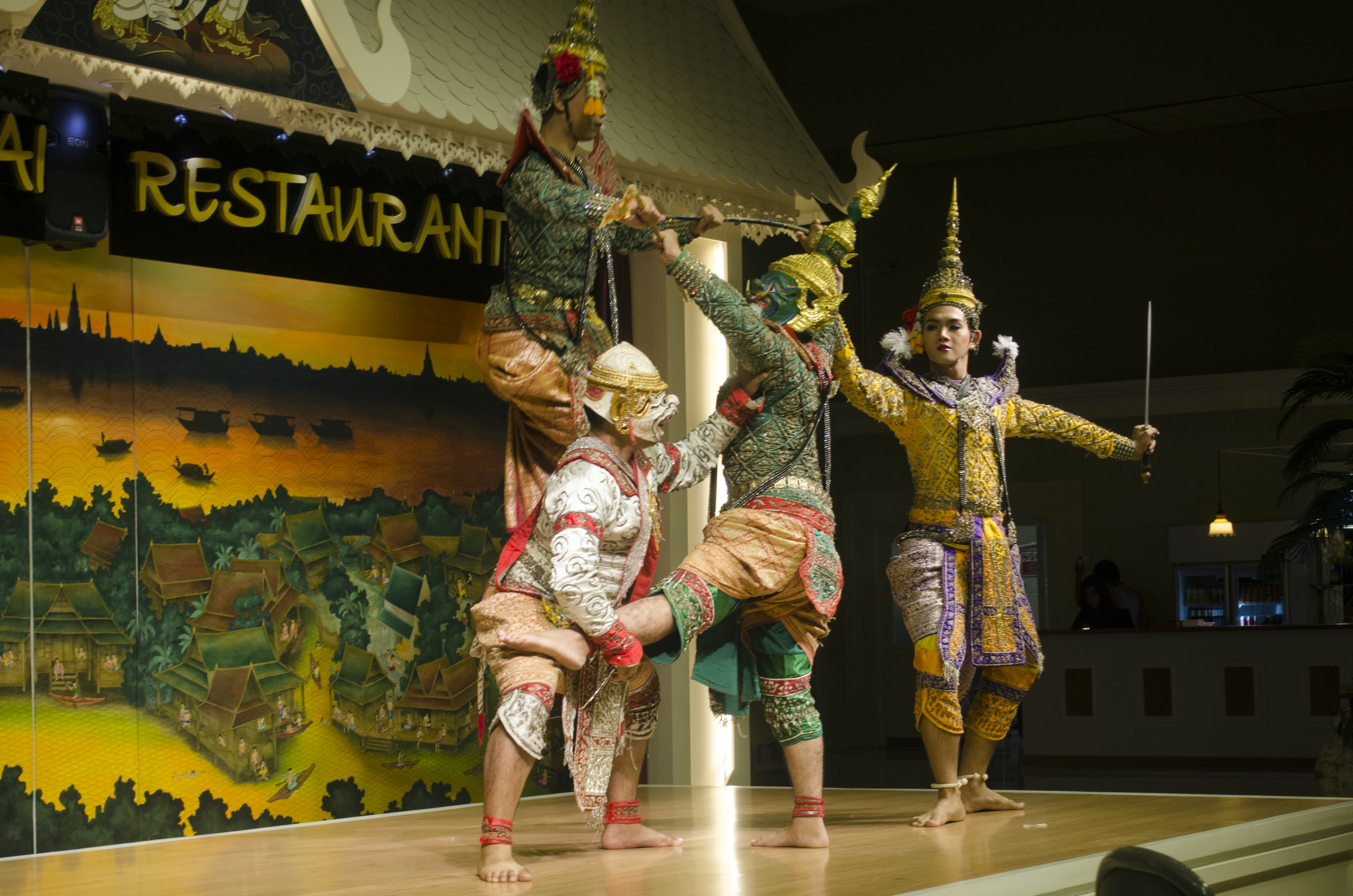
Khon performance at Asiatique, Thailand

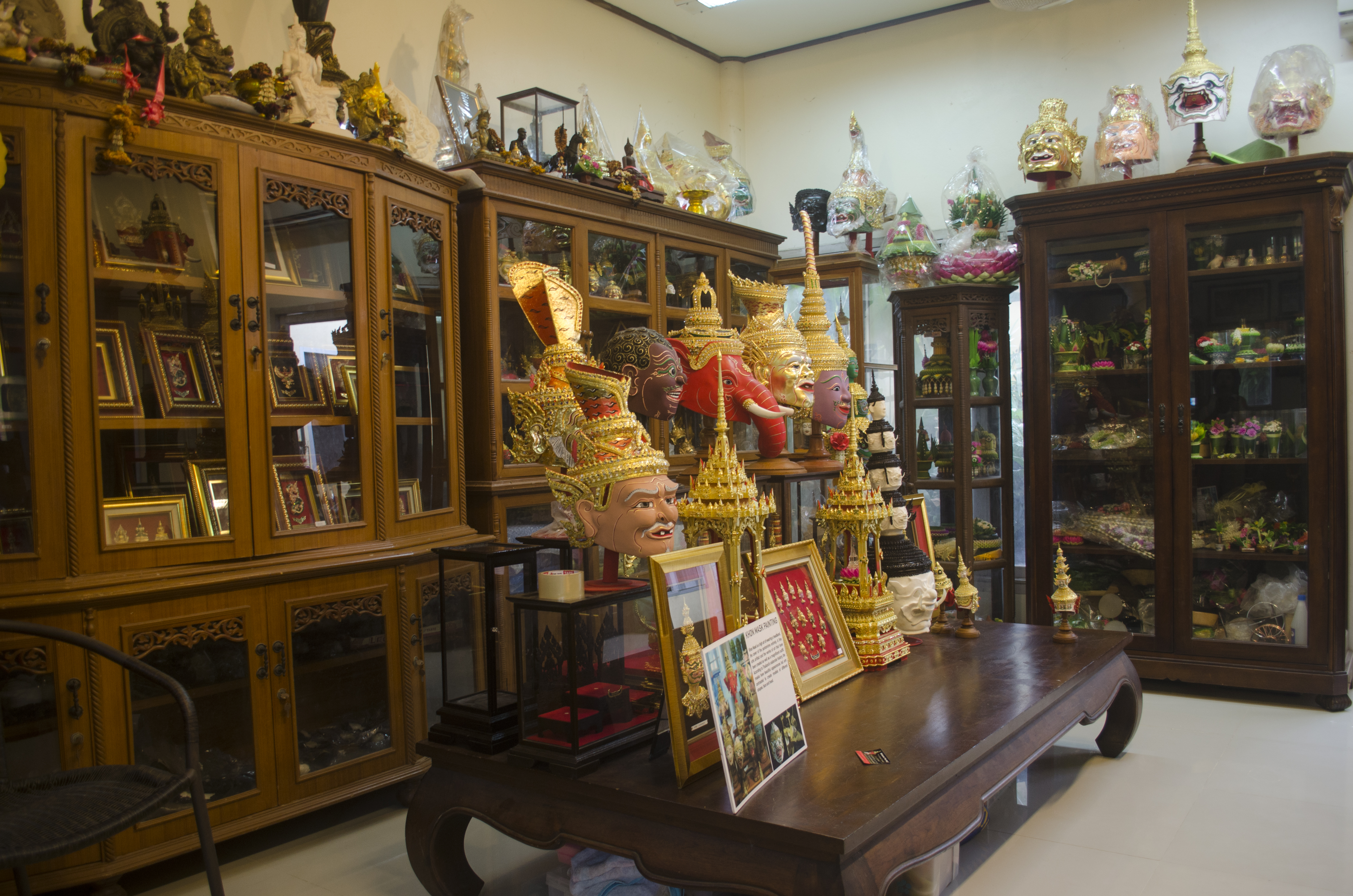
Khon mask shop, Bhutesavara

== See also ==
- Dance in Thailand
- List of Intangible Cultural Heritage elements in Thailand
- Ramayana, ancient Sanskrit epic
- Ramakien, national epic of Thailand
- Lakhon Khol, Cambodian equivalent
