= Skor yike =

Family of Cambodian frame drums

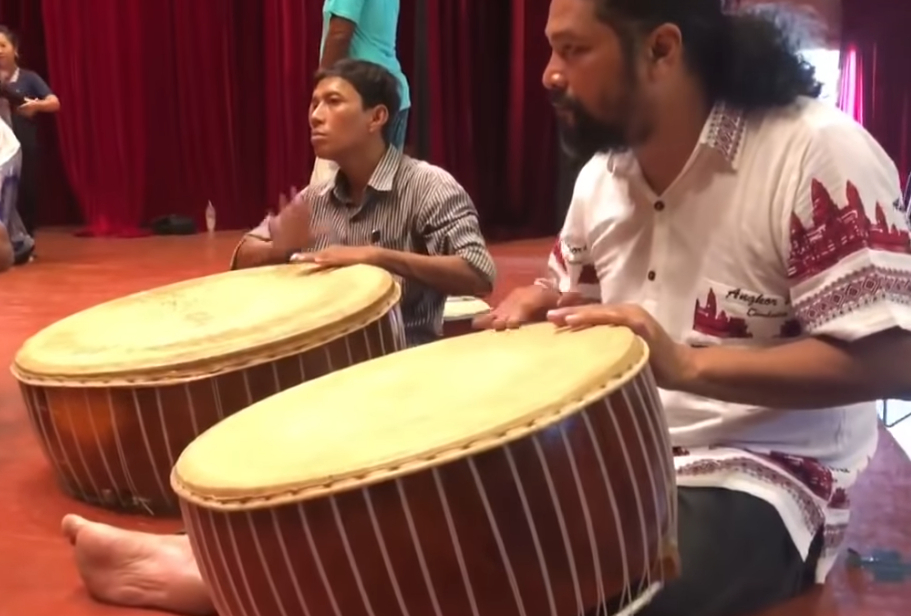
Two large skor yike, being used at a New Years Party featuring Lakhon Yike (Yike Opera).

At a New Years Party for members of a Yike Opera, members recall or perform pieces of their opera. Dancers are in the background, singers sit together up front, and skor yikes play.

The skor yike (Khmer: ស្គរយីកេ) is a family of Cambodian frame drums used in Yike theater. There are as many as 13 different sizes, including the largest, the skor mei (approximately 2 feet across, 25 centimeters/9 inches deep). In the Yike drama, the skor mei starts and ends the music.

In a Yike play, there may be from 2 to 13 drums. The largest skor mei drum begins, all perform, and then the instruments fall away until only the skor mei is still playing.

== See also ==
- Music of Cambodia
