= Rebana =

Musical instrument from Southeast Asia

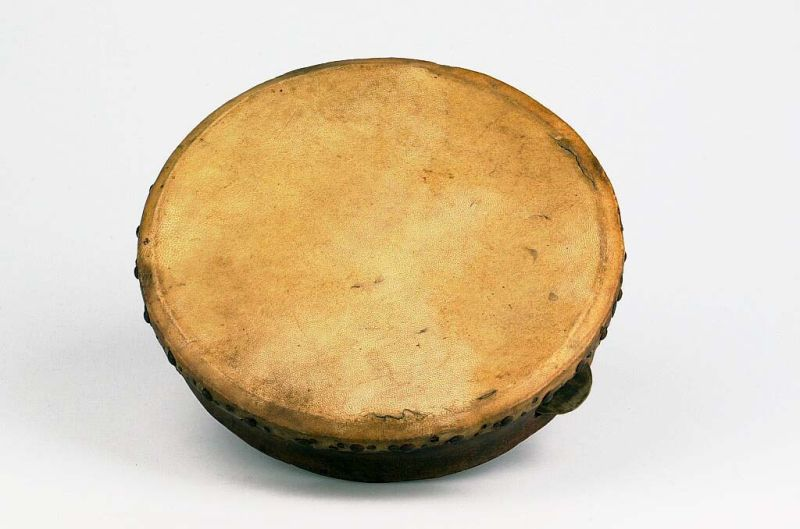

Percussion instrument
- Other names: terbangan
- Classification: Frame drum
- Hornbostel–Sachs classification: 211.311 (Directly struck membranophone)

A detail of the metal jingle in a rebana.

The rebana or terbangan is a tambourine that is used in Islamic devotional music in Southeast Asia, particularly in Indonesia, Malaysia, Brunei, and Singapore. The sound of the rebana often accompany Islamic ritual such as the zikir. The name rebana came from the Arabic word robbana ("our Lord"). The rebana is also used by the Cham people of Cambodia and also gave rise to the Rabana which is used by the Sinhalese people of Sri Lanka.

It is also used by the Cape Malays in Cape Town, South Africa.

== Cambodia ==
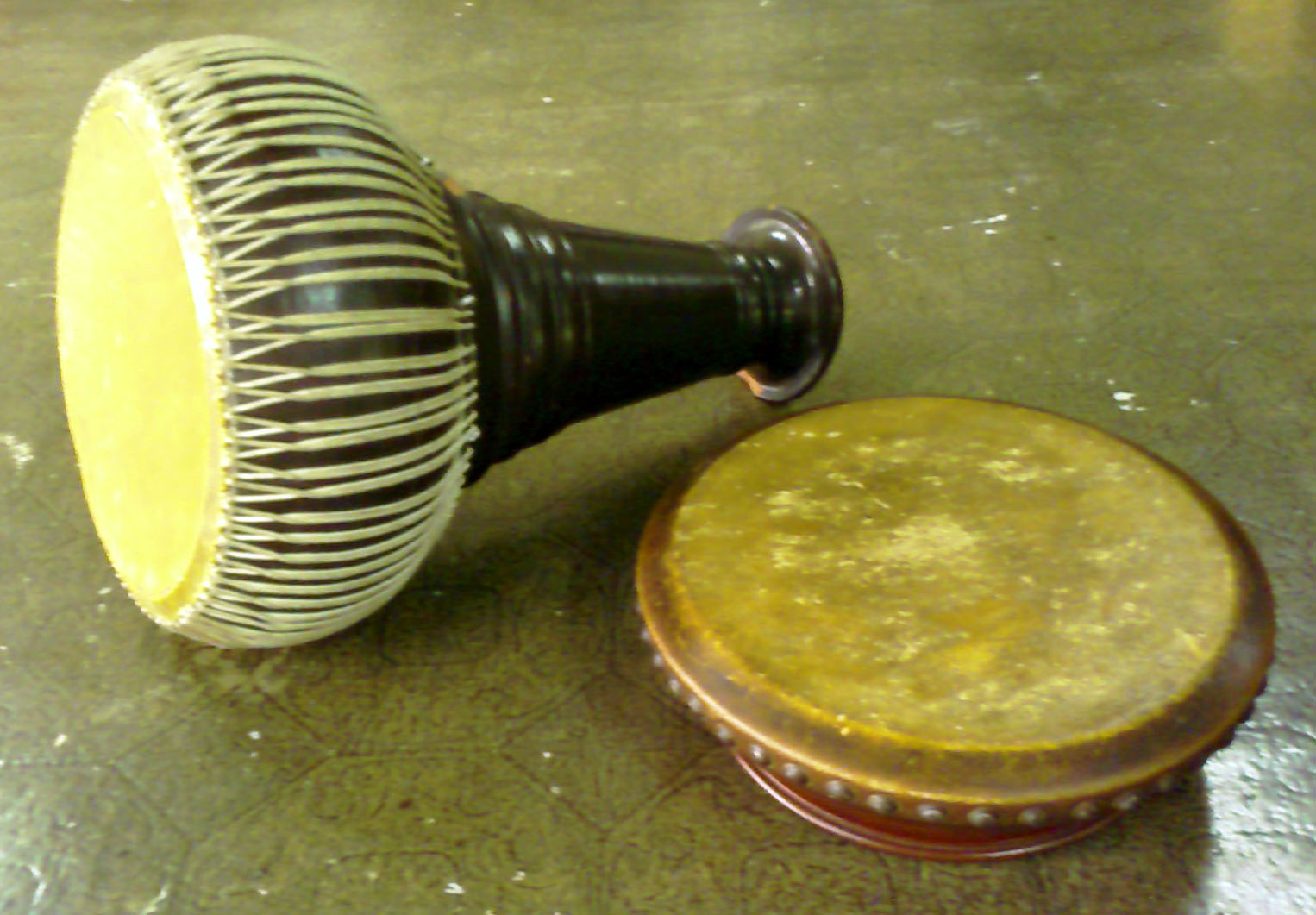
Two Thai drums. Thon and rammana.

The rebana is also used among the Cham and Malay ethnic groups in Cambodia. A large variation of the rebana is used in the Yike theatre of Cambodia where it is called skor yike ស្គរយីកេ (or yike drum).

== Indonesia ==
Rebana in Indonesia is particularly associated with the Muslim community, such as the Ponoraganese in Java, Minang in Sumatra and the Betawi in Jakarta.

=== Ponorogo ===
In Ponorogo Rebana called Kompang has been around since the 15th century, a change to the Buddha drum. Kompang is used as a typical Islamic musical instrument, the largest form of tambourine in the world is in Ponorogo. Kompang Ponorogo is spread in various cities on the island of Java, because many students study at traditional Pesantren Islamic of boarding schools in Ponorogo. Until Kompang Ponorogo spread to the Malay area after the son of a famous Pesantren of Islamic boarding school owner married the daughter of the Sultan of Selangor, the Ponorogo delegation showed the art of Kompang to the audience at the wedding. Kompang Ponorogo was favored by the people of Selangor and neighboring kingdoms such as Johor, Riau, Pattani, Brunei and Sabah.

=== Sumatra ===
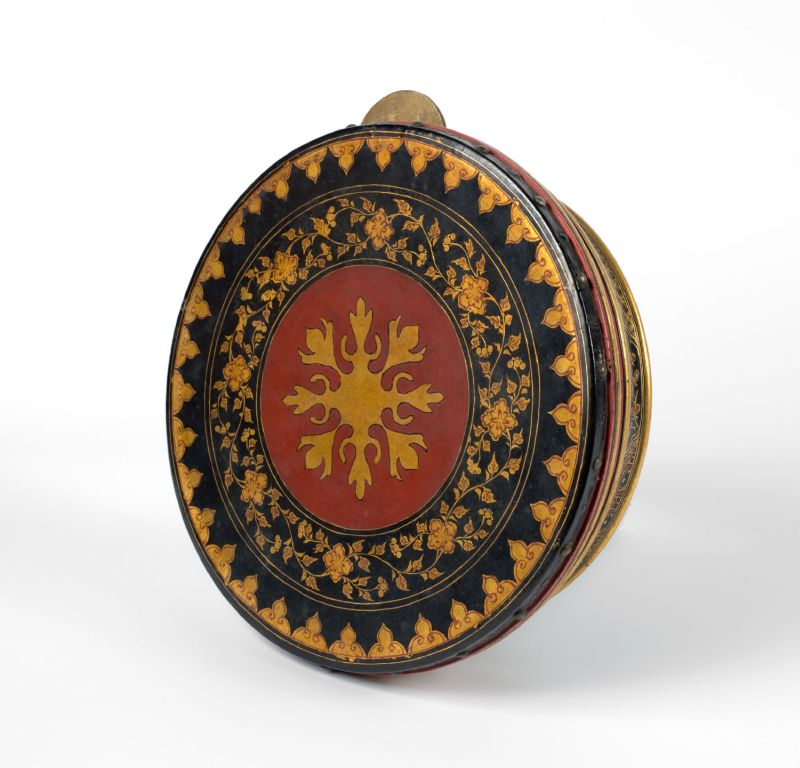
Redep, a rebana from Palembang, South Sumatra, with its typical red, black, and gold color.

The Minang people of West Sumatra use rebana in their traditional dance.

The redep or redap is a type of rebana from Palembang, South Sumatra. It is usually colored in red, black, and gold; a typical color in Palembang art. The redep is part of the kulintang ensemble of southern Sumatra, sometimes together with the serunai (oboe-like double reed) and a violin. These combinations suggest a combined influence of Buddhist, Hindu, Portuguese, Malay and Western Asia, Arab origins. West Asian music influenced southern Sumatra since the early 16th century when a Muslim sultanate of mixed Javanese and Arab blood reigned in Palembang.

=== Jakarta ===
The rebana in Jakarta is particularly associated with the Muslim community of Betawi, often found in Central and South Jakarta. Each kampong in Jakarta has its own rebana, for example, Rebana Burdah can be found in Kuningan Barat Kelurahan (Mampang Prapatan Subdistrict), while Rebana Maukhid is from Pejaten Kelurahan (Pasar Minggu Subdistrict). Rebana may be used in a wedding ritual or in a circumcision ceremony.

Rebana Biang is a large, jingle-less, 90 centimeter in diameter rebana. Rebana Biang can still be found in southern area of Jakarta, e.g. Ciganjur, Cijantung, Cakung, Ciseeng, Parung, Pondok Rajeg, Bojong Gede, and Citayam. Pondok Cina and Bintaro area used to have a Rebana Biang tradition, but it had vanished due to urbanization. Rebana Biang is also known as Rebana Gede, Rebana Salun, Gembyung, and Terbang Selamat. Rebana Biang is different with typical rebanas in which it has no metal jingles and the drumhead (or wangkis) is fixed using wedges instead of nails (not different with the Tifa from Maluku). It is assumed that the Rebana Biang originated from the period before the coming of Islam to Indonesia. Rebana Biang may accompany other smaller rebanas in an ensemble. Because of its large size, feet and knees may be used to support the rebana, which may also be used to control the sound of the rebana.

Rebana Burdah is a 50 centimeter in diameter rebana. The name Burdah comes from the Al Burda qaida (qaida is a form of Arabic poem) which is usually accompanied by the Rebana Burdah ensemble, or from the name of the leader of the Rebana Burdah ensemble, the Arab descendant Sayid Abdullah Ba'mar. Rebana Burdah can be found in Kuningan Sarat (Mampang Prapatan Subdistrict).

Rebana Maukhid is a 40 centimeter in diameter rebana from Pejaten, Pasar Minggu Subdistrict. Rebana Maukhid usually accompanies song by Abdullah Alhadad, who is said to come from Hadhramaut, and whose descendants live in Pejaten.

Rebana Ketimpring contains three pairs of jingles in its body. The ensemble of Rebana Ketimpring contains three players, each holding three rebanas with sizes between 20 and 25 centimeter called rebana tiga, rebana empat, and rebana lima respectively. Rebana lima is placed in the center and acts as the leader of the ensemble. Rebana Ketimpring are used in the feast of a wedding ceremony (called ngarak) or in a blessing-asking rituals such as a circumcision ritual or after a child birth (called maulid)

Rebana Dor is a rebana which contains small holes on its side to ease its handling. Rebana Kasidah or Qasidah is a modernized form of Rebana Dor whose singer is usually a female. Rebana Kasidah is the most popular form of rebana, with more than 600 bands of Rebana Kasidah in Jakarta alone, and is considered a pop music.

== Malaysia ==
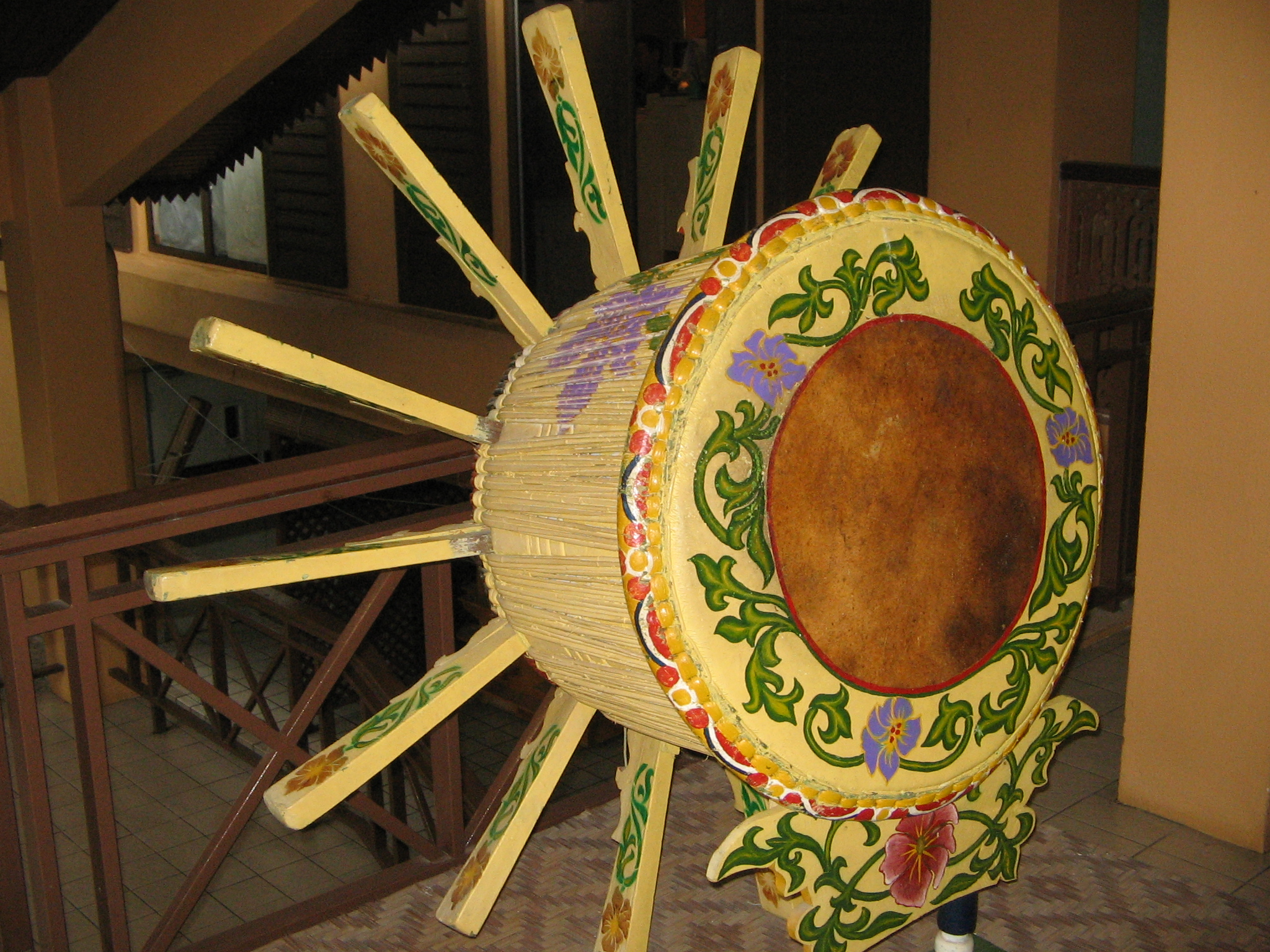
Rebana ubi

The largest type of Malay rebana, the rebana ubi, is widely used by people in east-coast states of Kelantan and Terengganu.

This instrument is derived from the Arabic cultural elements. but according to the saga of local stories, musical instruments Kompang entrance on the ground wither exactly selangor brought by the great scholar of the family entourage of the Pondok Tegalsari in Ponorogo, the island of Java, which is the forerunner of Pondok Modern Darussalam Gontor, dato Khasan Besari. The delegation of Jawa intend to enliven the marriage of his son Dato Zainal Abidin who was about to marry the daughter of the king of Malay Selangor. After the king's death Selangor, Selangor position as king was replaced by Zaenal Abidin and hereditary until now.

Smaller rebanas also known as Kompangs are widely used by the Malay people when celebrating the bride and groom in a wedding ceremony. Rebana Hadrah came from the state of Johor.

The Rebana is the image engraved on one side of the Malaysian 1 sen coin.

== South Africa ==
The Cape Malays, an ethnic group in Cape Town which arose from the Dutch East India Company's use of slaves in the Dutch Cape Colony, use the rebana, also spelt "rebanna", in their traditional music.
