= Yike =

Genre of Cambodian musical theater

Yike (Khmer: យីកេ, pronounced [ˈjiːkeː]) is a prominent form of Cambodian musical theater, along with Bassac theater and Niyeai. "Lakhon Yike" (Khmer:ល្ខោន យីកេ, literally Yike theater) incorporates singing and dancing and "an ensemble of both traditional and modern instruments."

Yike is believed to originate from Champa, and was imported to Cambodia in the Funan period. Yike is performed in nearly every province of Cambodia and by the Khmer Krom communities in southern Vietnam. The Khmer Krom use the term yike, similar to the rest of the Khmer communities, and the term, yuke, which is used to refer to the dance theatre also known as Lakhon Bassac.

== Performances ==
Performances of the yike are often commenced with a dance performance called robam yike hom rong, which is used for invocation. For most of the performance, a dancing style similar to rom kbach is lightly incorporated.

The stories are often of various Jatakas or tales of the Buddha's life. Performances of the story of Tum Teav in the yike are also common. It is performed in a circle so viewers could see it from every angle. The performances gained popularity with Cambodian farmers, thus it have changed over time into a theatrical art form to promote the teachings of Buddhism and Brahmanism.

In a Yike drama, the skor mei (the largest of the yike drum family) starts and ends the music. There may be from 2 to 13 drums in the ensemble. The largest skor mei drum plays first, as others gradually join. Finally, the instruments fall away until only the skor mei is playing.

== See also ==
- Jikey
- Theatre of Cambodia
- Dance of Cambodia
- Cham people
