= Theatre of Cambodia =

A group of performers part of the Royal Ballet of Cambodia.

Theatre of Cambodia known as Lakhon (Khmer: ល្ខោន) is composed of many different genres. There are three main categories: classical, folk, and modern. Many forms of theatre in Cambodia incorporate dance movement into performances and are referred to as dance dramas.

== Classical ==
- Lakhon Preah Reach Trop (Khmer: ល្ខោនព្រះរាជទ្រព្យ, also known as the Royal Ballet of Cambodia) is the main form of classical dance drama performed in Cambodia. It is also referred to as Lakhon luong and Lakhon Kbach Boran Khmer in Cambodia. This dance drama is the most refined of all theatre in Cambodia and was particularly patronized by royalty. It is heavily stylized with gestures and postures meant to entrance the viewer.
- Lakhon Khol (Khmer: ល្ខោនខោល, Masked Drama Dance) is a masked dance drama featuring male performers. The repertoire consists solely of material from Reamker. The choreography is styled similarly to the Royal Ballet of Cambodia although not as refined and is performed along to narrators and a pinpeat ensemble.
- Lakhon Pol Srey (Khmer: ល្ខោនពោលស្រី, Female Narrative Theatre) is a dance drama akin to the lakhon khol; the performers being female however. Both forms combine classical theatre and dance and are accompanied by the traditional pin peat orchestra. Unlike Lakhon Khol, which use a separate group of narrators, lakhon pol srey dancers take turns narrating while other members continue to dance. The dancers often lift their masks and narrate directly to the audience. It is believed to have originated from the Kingdom of Oudong between 1618 and 1628 during the reign of King Chey Chettha II. In 1878, Ms. Chinh, a great art teacher from Koh Oknheatey, came to teach Lakhon Pol Srey in Wat Keansvay Krao. Today, one of her students, a 70-year-old woman, Ms. Chea Samut, has taken a lead role in reviving lakhaon poul srei and currently teaches this drama form to students at Wat Keansvay Krao, after having disappeared for more than 40 years.
- Lakhon Berk Bat is a lost theatre form in Cambodian Court. It is believed to have originated in the Post-Angkor period. Some older Royal Ballet dancers also recalled hearing that it was created in the late Angkor period, but little is known as to why it was discontinued. Evidence reveals that the drama was re-instituted during the reign of Oudong city by King Norodom in the late 1950s. The form disappeared again in the late 1970s during the time of the Khmer Rouge regime. It is assumed that lakhon berk bat was only performed in the presence of royal or noble families due to the dancers elaborate and expensive costumes and jewelry. As the art form emphasized beauty, character and technique, performers were expected to be not only beautiful, but to be able to act, sing, and speak well. The ability to sing unaccompanied was especially prized.
- Lakhon Nang Sbek (Khmer: ល្ខោនណាំងស្បែក, Shadow Puppet Theatre) refers to Khmer shadow theatre

== Folk ==
- Yike is dance drama with strong influences from Cham and Malay culture. It utilizes a style of singing reminiscent of the Islamic traditions of the Cham and Malay people. It incorporates basic dance movements with the hands swaying back and forth, although not as stylized as classic forms. The music consists of rebana drums and other Khmer instruments such as the tro.
- Lakhon bassac or basak is one of the most popular folk theatre in Cambodia. It takes its name from the districts adjoining in the Bassac river in the former Cambodian province of Preah Trapeang, now known as Trà Vinh Province and part of Southern Vietnam. In the day of French rule, the troupes freely moved between Cambodia and Southern Vietnam, for both areas is the part of French Indochina. It is reminiscent of Vietnamese opera with the male character costumes styled after Vietnamese opera costumes, although the female characters wears traditional Cambodian costumes. Lakhon bassac is the only theatre form familiar with in which Indian based theatrical elements and Sinic based theatrical elements are mixed in almost equal amount.
- Lakhon phleng kar (Khmer: ល្ខោនភ្លេងការ, lit., 'wedding music theatre') is a drama performed accompanied by traditional wedding music. This theatre form had travel from the court into the regular people's favourite. It notable used in Cambodia for the rich family until Lovek era after the strongly Javanese Influenced both on Music and wedding dress. The drama, like the music, is believed to have appeared as early as the 1st century during the wedding ceremony of Preah Thong and Neang Neak.
- Lakhon ape is a mixture of yike and classical dance form
- Lakhon kamnap (lit., poetry theatre)
- Lakhon mahori (lit., mahori theatre) consists of folkloric dance accompanied by a mahori ensemble.

== Modern ==
- Lakhon niyeay (lit., spoken theatre)
