= Lakhon Khol =

Cambodian dance drama genre

Lakhon Khol Khmer Masked Theatre ល្ខោនខោល
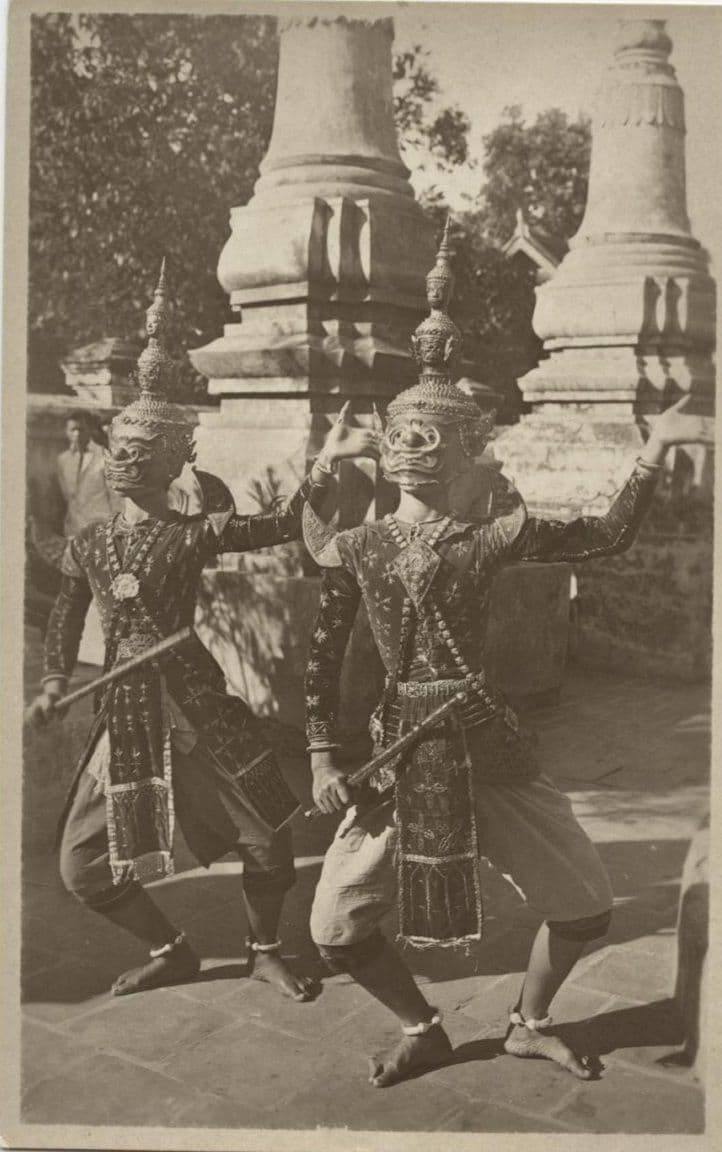
- Medium: Dance drama
- Originating culture: Cambodia

Lkhon Khol Wat Svay Andet
- UNESCO Intangible Cultural Heritage
- Country: Cambodia
- Reference: 01374
- Region: Asia and the Pacific

Inscription history
- Inscription: 2018 (13th session)
- List: Need of Urgent Safeguarding

Lakhon Khol (Khmer: ល្ខោនខោល, Lkhaôn Khaôl; Khmer pronunciation: [lkʰaon kʰaol]) or Khmer Masked Theatre is a dance drama genre that is performed in Cambodia.

== History ==
Lakhon Khol is a traditional theatre performance of Cambodia. Mask theatre of Cambodia has originated during the Angkor period. It is believed to have been performed since the 10th century based on the inscription inside of the Sambor Prei Kuk temple created during the reign of King Jayavarman V (CE 968-1001). Lakhon Khol is believed to be a derivative of the Drama, acronym in the High Priest's Dictionary Chuon Nath. That short forms can be interpreted as a form of drama, played out in a series of short stories. The word Khol Is encountered in a number of other inscriptions carved in stone, such as K.566-a a rock above the Stung Sreng Siem Reap province inscribed at the end of the 10th century which refers to a dance performed by masked actors. The theatrical drama was developed from the Khmer shadow theatre called "Lakhon Sbeak Thom; Khmer: ល្ខោនស្បែកធំ”. Lakhon Khol was recorded by Henri Mouhot at a restaurant dinner with a dance performance in the Royal Palace in the city Oudong with King Ang Duong in 1856. Until the Royal King Sisowath, the royal dance in the form of dance was frequently performed for French diplomats or anthropologists as a form of traditional Khmer entertainment.George Groslier compiled the diary "Danseuses Cambodgiennes, Anciennes & Modernes" 1913. Royal dance in the form of Lakhon Khol means that the king royal dance is a form of dance masks. The evolution of Cambodian dance art is linked to nature, social class, and Brahmin religion, the original religion of the country India, Hindu religion, which is related to the story incorporated into the art of Cambodian dance, the liveliness of Cambodian dances are recorded by George Coedes (La dance du Cambodge) in 1944.

Lakhon Khol reappeared once again in the 20th century in King Sisowath and continued to King Norodom Sihanouk in 1948, after the end of the World War II by organizing a rehearsal Initially, he visited the Vegetable History at (Lakhon Khol Wat Svay Andet) in Kandal Province, which performed theatrical theatre for rainfall and peace to the community every year. The visit to Norodom Sihanouk 's Wat Svay Andet masked dance theatre was published in 1948 as the first magazine in the journal "Kampuchea Soriya" by Tep Pitur Chhim Krasem or Duke of (Krosem Kuntheak Bondit). In the Soriya Magazine (March 3, 1948), the 3rd edition was published in March 1948, titled "The Lakhon Khol Wat Svay Andet" and stated in the NPL "The theatre is limited to the only thing related to Hinduism. Which only plays for the divinities of divisions, such as Reamker and some other things." Later, there was a Giant with Hanuman statue iconic Lakhon Khol In Phnom Penh in 1954, after independence from France, but the statue lost and instead the Chuon Nath statue still remains.

Another specific story of the theatrical performance is the Reamker, the Khmer legend of the Ramayana. The performance includes an introduction to storytellers who play an important role in the performance and classical music of the Pin Peat. The theatre was popular in the Lon Nol era, and then became King Sihanouk's favourite wife. There were eight teams of specialist theatre and then ravaged by war, but now only one group is at Wat Svay Andet, 15 km (9.3 mi) away from Phnom Penh. Two new groups started in the war, including the Kampong Thom and National Theater troupes from the Department of Fine Arts and the Ministry of Culture and Fine Arts. And now the drama is also part of the schedule of studies at the University of Fine Arts. Lakhon Khol was Inscribed in a tentative list of UNESCO intangible culture heritage as Urgent safeguarding on March 31, 2017, by the Ministry of culture and fine art.

On November 28, 2018, Lkhon Khol Wat Svay Andet was included in the List of Intangible Cultural Heritage in Need of Urgent Safeguarding of UNESCO.

== Lakhon Khol Characters ==
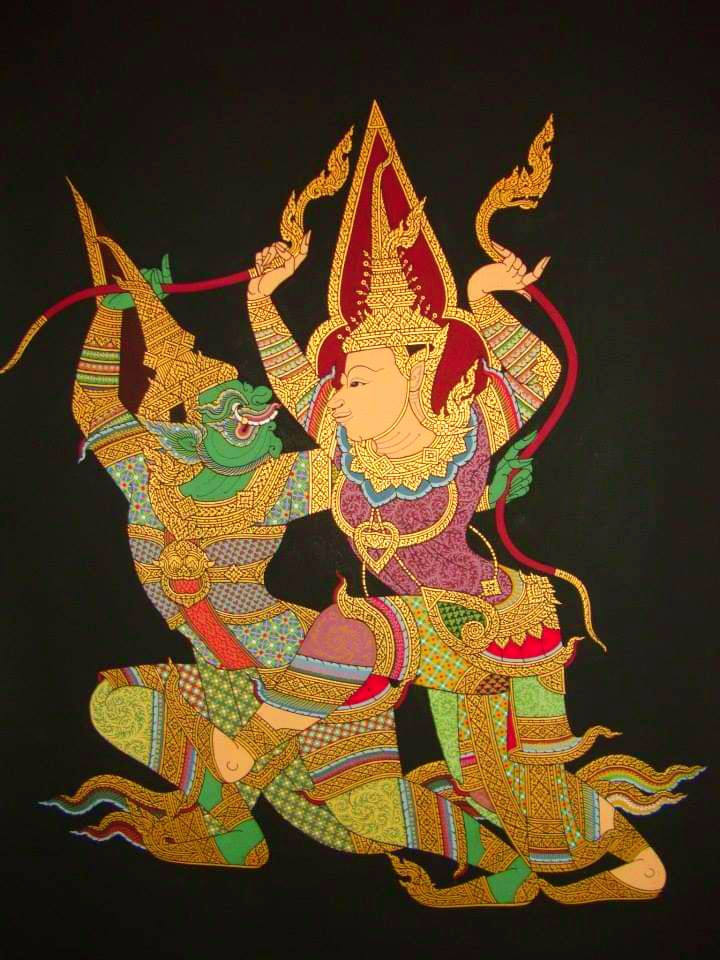
Lakhon Khol Art painting

Lakhon Khol Characters are divided into 4 categories based on types of masks worn by actors

=== Devas Characters ===
Devas Casting	Color Characters	Character type
Ream as Rama		
Preah Leak as Lakshmana		
Seyda as Sita		

=== 19 Monkeys General Characters ===
19 Monkeys General Casting	Color Characters	Character type
Hanuman		Commander of the Monkey Army

=== Asura Characters ===
Asura Casting	Color Characters	Character type
Krong Reap as Ravana		King of The Lanka City

=== Animals Creatures Characters ===
Animal Casting	Color Characters	Character type
Tupi		King of Buffalo

== The Group Local of Lakhon Khol ==
- Lakhon Khol Phnom Penh
- Lakhon Khol Battambang Province
- Lakhon Khol Pursat Province
- Lakhon Khol Kampong Thom Province
- Lakhon Khol Wat Svay Andet Kandal Province (List of Intangible Cultural Heritage in Need of Urgent Safeguarding)
- Lakhon Khol Teok Khleang Village Kandal Province
- Lakhon Khol Khoh Rak Village Kandal Province
- Lakhon Khol Tycoon Island Or Khoh Og Nha Tey Kandal Province
- Lakhon Khol Parong Village Kandal Province
- Lakhon Khol Kien Svay pagoda Kandal Province

== See also ==
- Royal Ballet of Cambodia
- Dance of Cambodia
- Khmer culture
- Theatre of Cambodia
- Chapei Dang Veng
- Lbeng Teanh Prot
- Apsara dance
- UNESCO intangible world heritage of Cambodia
- Nuon Kan
