= Robam Sovann Maccha =

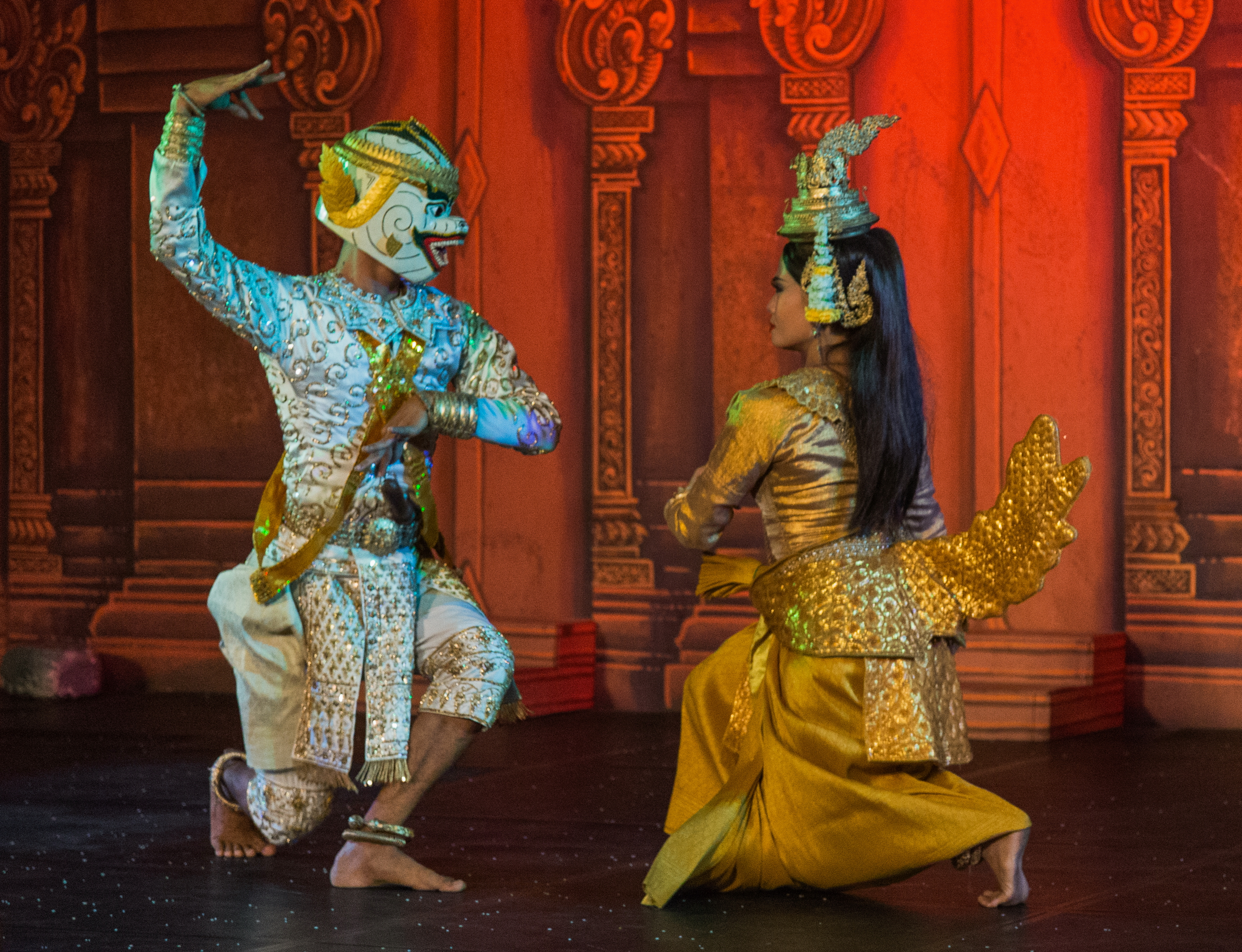
Hanuman overcomes Sovan Maccha

Robam Sovann Maccha (Khmer: របាំសុវណ្ណមច្ឆា, also Robam Hanuman and Sovann Maccha) is a traditional Cambodian dance. It narrates the encounter of Hanuman and Sovann Maccha during the construction of the causeway to Lanka in Reamker, a Cambodian version of Indian epic Ramayana.

== History ==
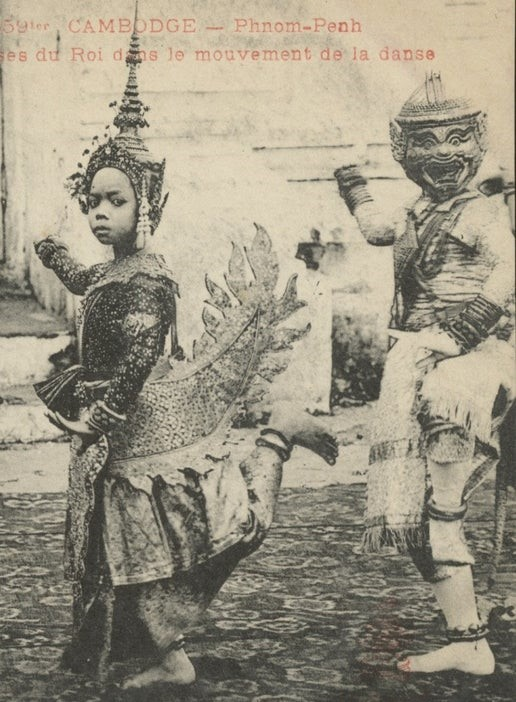
Cambodian Sovann Maccha and Hanuman characters in 1906.

=== Robam ===
One of the earliest records of dance (Khmer: robam/ rabam) in Cambodia is from the 7th century, where performances were used as a funeral rite for kings. During the Angkor period, dance was ritually performed at temples.

The repertoire of the female dance that was famously known in the West as Royal Ballet of Cambodia is composed of about 60 dance (pure dance pieces) and among them Robam Sovann Maccha, extracted from Reamker is an episode of great popularity among Cambodian audience.

=== Reamker ===
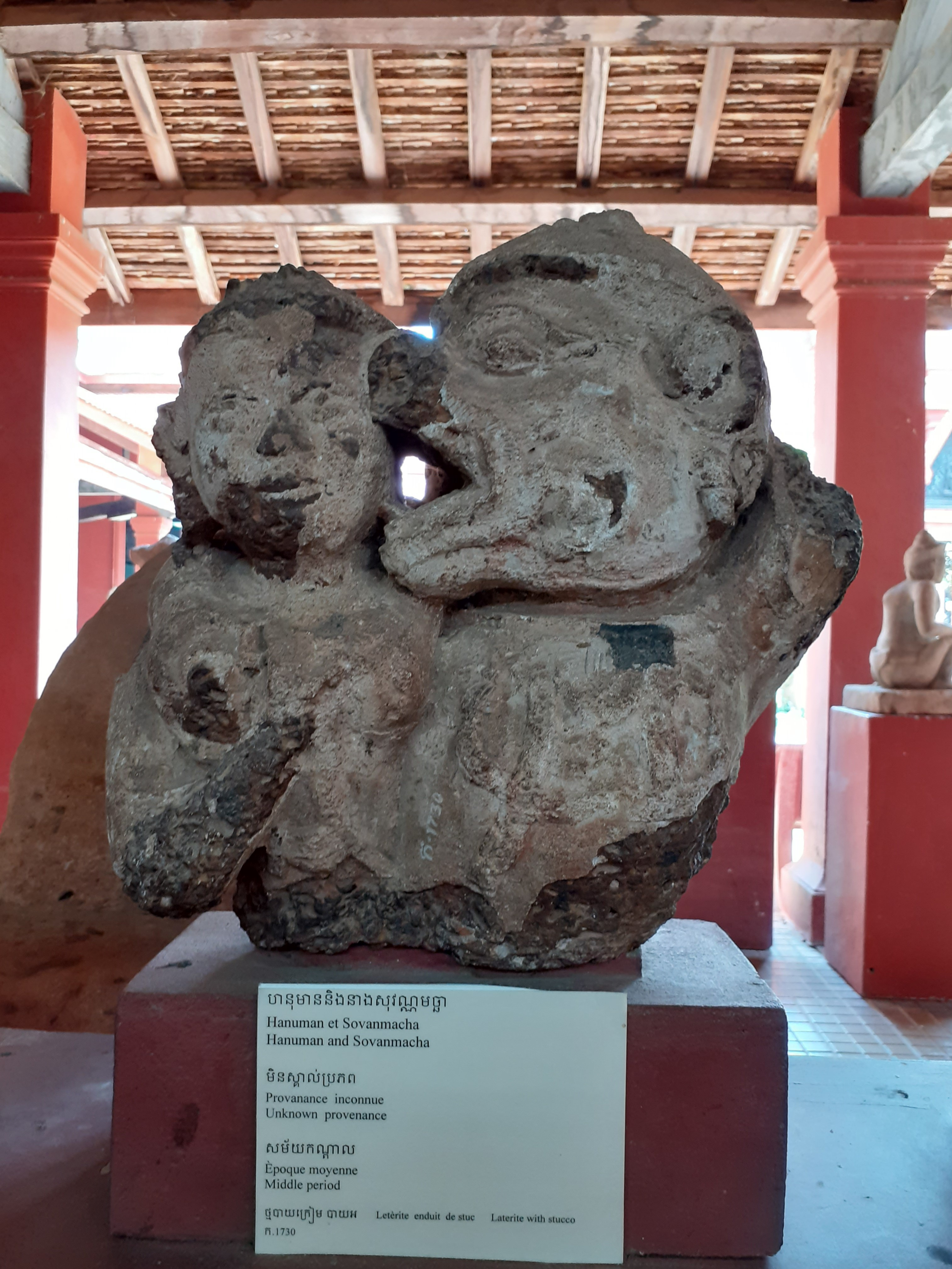
Hanuman flirting Sovann Machha (Middle Khmer period). National Museum of Cambodia. Phnom Penh.

The original Ramayana arrived to Southeast Asia from South India along with Hinduism, but its adaptation there suggests Buddhist influence.

The exact time that Ramayana was introduced to Cambodia is unknown. The earliest mentioning of the epic dates to the 7th century according to a stone inscription at Veal Kantel, Stueng Treng. Based on this inscription, the epic then existed in Cambodia as the inscription mentioned the offering of the epic's manuscript to a temple that expressed its importance in Khmer belief. The surviving text of Reamker dates to the 16th century. Intricate carvings on the walls of Angkor Wat depict a scene from the Ramayana dating back nearly a millennium. Statues of the poem's heroes were worshiped in temple sanctuaries, akin to the wall paintings at Cambodia's Royal Palace and Wat Bo.

The Cambodian version includes incidents and details not found in the Sanskrit original written by the poet Valmiki. An example of a story that does not appear in Indian texts and performance is that of the encounter between Hanuman, the monkey general, and Sovann Maccha, the mermaid, a favorite of Cambodian audiences.

== Story ==
The dance narrates a scene of Reamker. Preah Ream (Rama) orders Hanuman to construct a causeway. He directed monkey troops to collect rocks and drop them into the sea. But these rocks kept disappearing. Hanuman dove into the sea to discover that the golden mermaid—Sovann Maccha—was responsible for the disruption. While trying to overcome Sovann Maccha, they fall in love, then give birth to a monkey with a fish tail known as Macchanub. Hanuman explains to the golden mermaid why he needed the rocks. Sovann Maccha agrees to allow the causeway to be built, and returns the stolen rocks. She then assists Hanuman in the project.

== Character and costumes ==
The characters performs in Robam Sovann Maccha consists of Sovan Machha- the golden mermaid who leads a shoal of fish disrupting the construction of the causeway to Lanka and Hanuman- the monkey general who leads a troop of monkeys.

=== Sovann Maccha ===
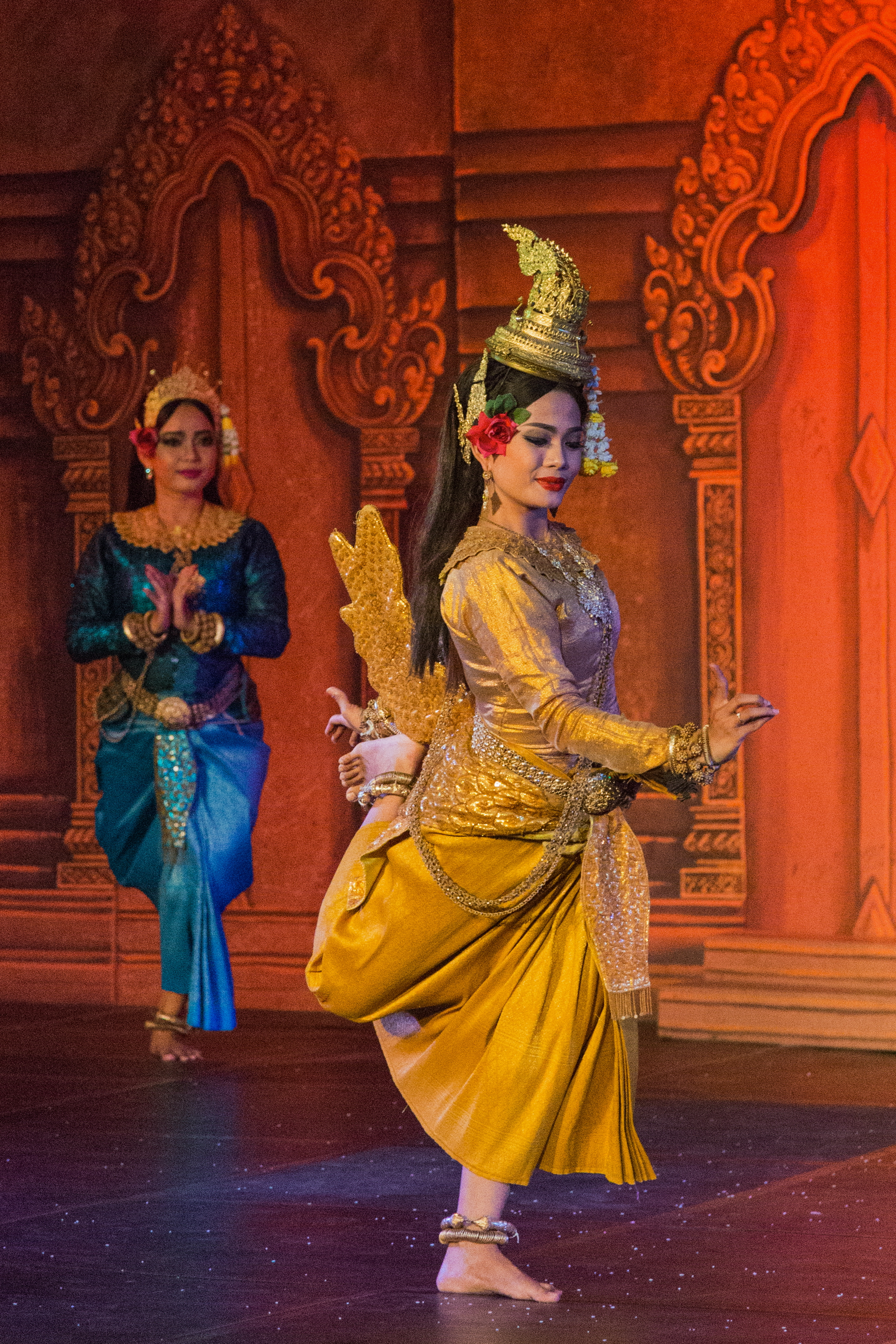
Sovann Maccha dancing in gold costume.

In the past, Sovann Maccha worn mokot ksatrei, a single-spire crown as seen in the Reamker mural painting at Silver Pagoda in Phnom Penh and the Sovan Maccha dancer in the 1900s.

However, in today traditional dance, most Sovann Maccha character wears another type of crown known as mokot kantuy hong (hamsa's tailed crown).

The costume is seen solely gold in accordance to the character's name (Sovannn Maccha) which is literally translated as golden mermaid. The ears are adorned with flora (flower and lbak pkar on both side), the earrings, and chor trajeak (ears decorating jewelry). Unlike other female roles in Royal Ballet of Cambodia, Sovann Maccha does not wear sbai (a shawl-like garment worn in Cambodia) and only wears a gold long sleeved silk shirt. Around the neck and over the shirt is an embroidered collar known as srang kor. A decorated band of beads known as ksae sangvar is worn crosswise. Over the srong kor is a large-single pendant necklace.

The character of Sovann Maccha wear a gold sampot sarabap. The sampot is wrapped around the lower body and then pleated into a band in the front and secured with a gold or brass belt. An embroidered piece of cloth is worn in front under the belt. Moreover, Sovann Maccha wears decorative and embroidered cloth with fish scale patter in the shape of a tail of fish (caudal fin) from the front to the back side with another piece of embroidered cloth drops downward. This caudal fin-shaped cloth piece distinguish Sovann Maccha from other female role in Royal Ballet of Cambodia.

The jewelry for this role includes various types of ankle and wrists bracelets and bangles with many styles.

=== Hanuman ===
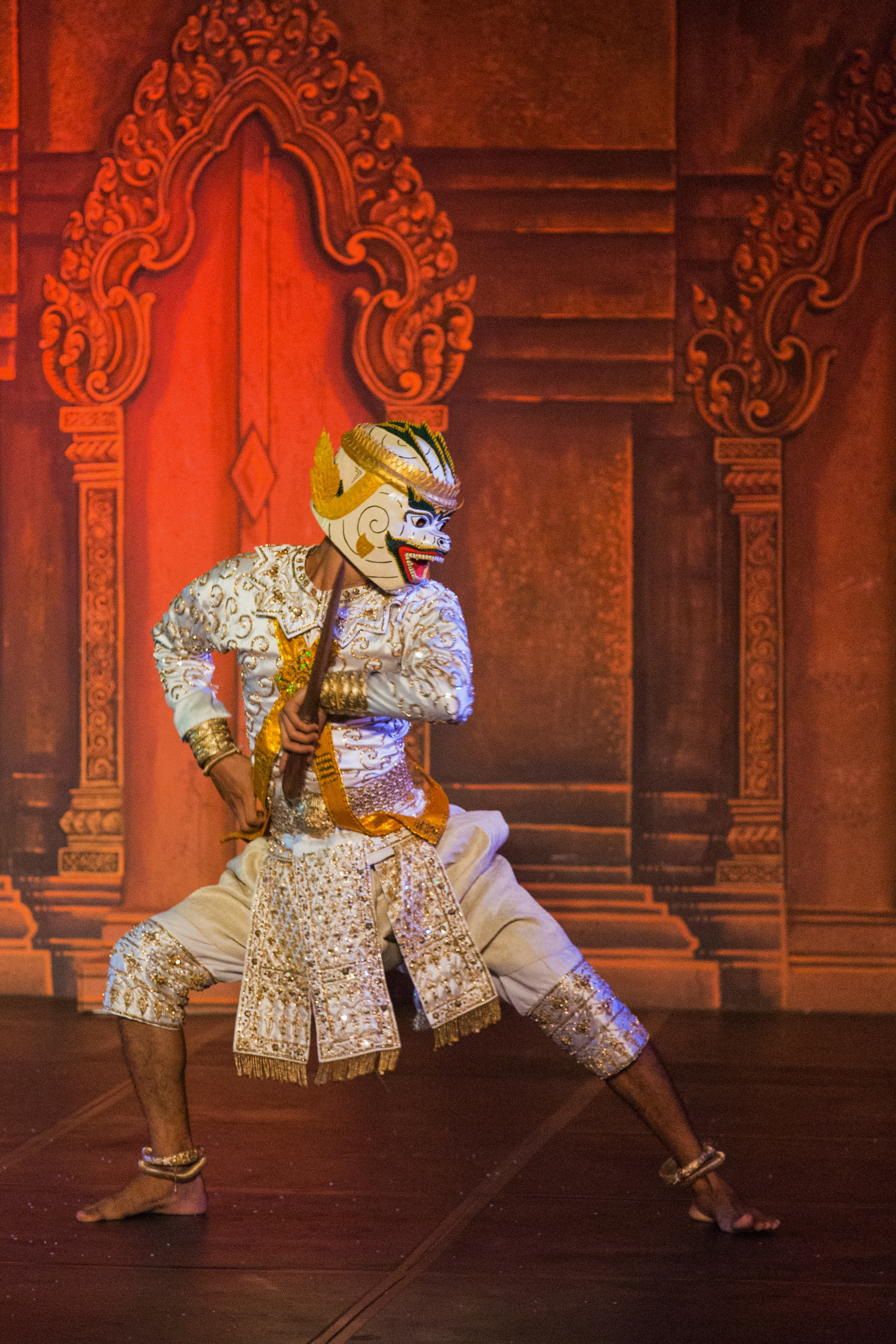
Hanuman costume with his mask.

Human's entire costume can be seen solely white.

The character wears monkey mask, designed specifically for the character. Hanuman also wears the srong kor, an embroidered collar around the neck.

Unlike other female characters' costume, Hanuman's costumes are more intricate than the female role, as they require pieces, like sleeves, to be sewn together while being put on.

The shirt that Hanuman character worn is a white silk long sleeved shirt with gold spiral as the pattern. Under the srong kor and over the shirt is a sangvar, an X-like strap around the body. A kite-shaped ornament called 'sloek por' is also worn on the centre point of the sangvar.

The 'sampot' is worn in the 'chang kben' fashion, where the front is pleated and pulled under, between the legs, then tucked in the back and the remaining length of the pleat is stitched to the 'sampot' itself. Knee-length pants are worn underneath, displaying a wide, embroidered hem around the knees. The other component of Hanuman's costume are three richly embroidered banners worn around the front waist. The front piece is called 'robang muk' while the two side pieces are known as a 'cheay kraeng' with another piece in the back called a 'robang kraoy'. At the back side, over the 'robang kraoy' is a long piece of cloth like a rope, representing monkey's tail.

This characters also wear the similar ankle and wrist jewelry as females. Hanuman character possesses a short dagger as the weapon.

=== Other characters ===
The other characters that plays minor role in Robam Sovann Maccha are the mermaid companions who follow Sovann Maccha to disrupt the construction of causeway and the monkey troops who participated in the construction of the causeway connecting Lanka.

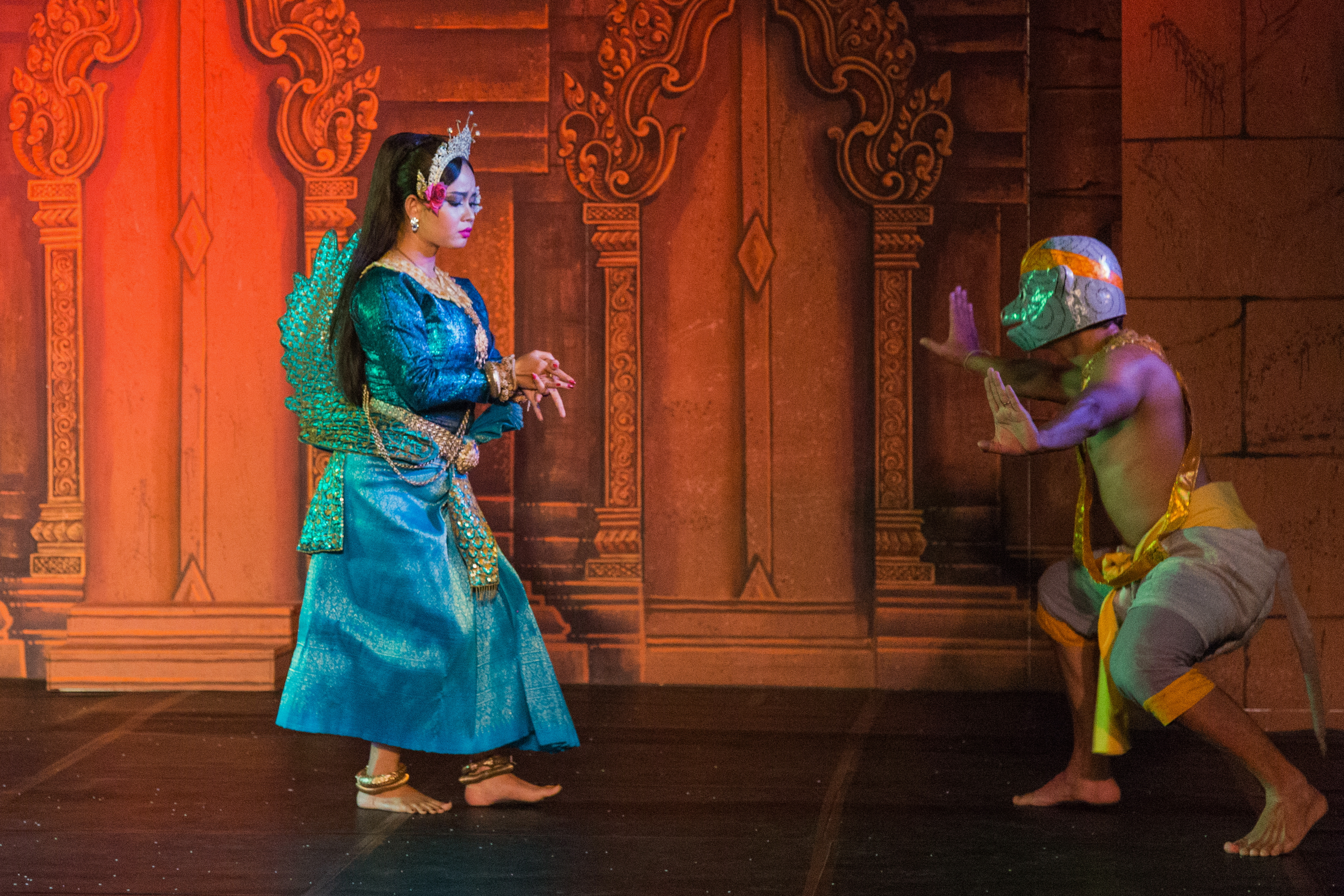
A mermaid companion and a monkey troop.

==== Mermaid companions ====
The costume of the other mermaid characters or fish shoal can be distinguished from Sovann Maccha via their blue costume and kbang (front crown) is worn instead of mokot kantuy hong. The rest of the decoration, jewelry, and costume is similar to that of Sovann Maccha.

==== Monkey troop ====
The other monkey troops plays minor in the dance, thus the costume is quite simple compare to Hanuman. The whole costume is seen as grey in color representing the fur of a monkey. The characters wears a simple mask with less decoration designed for this minor monkey role. The characters are shirtless, only wears the srong kor (an embroidered collar around the neck) and the X-like strap around the body called sangwar with a kite-shaped ornament called sloek por. The sampot and pants are worn in chang kben style, similar to that of Hanuman but with simple and less decorative clothes tied by a piece of yellow cloth as the belt. The jewelry is absent for the characters.

== See also ==
- Dance in Cambodia
- Royal Ballet of Cambodia
- Reamker
- Suvannamaccha
