= Reamker =

Cambodian epic poem

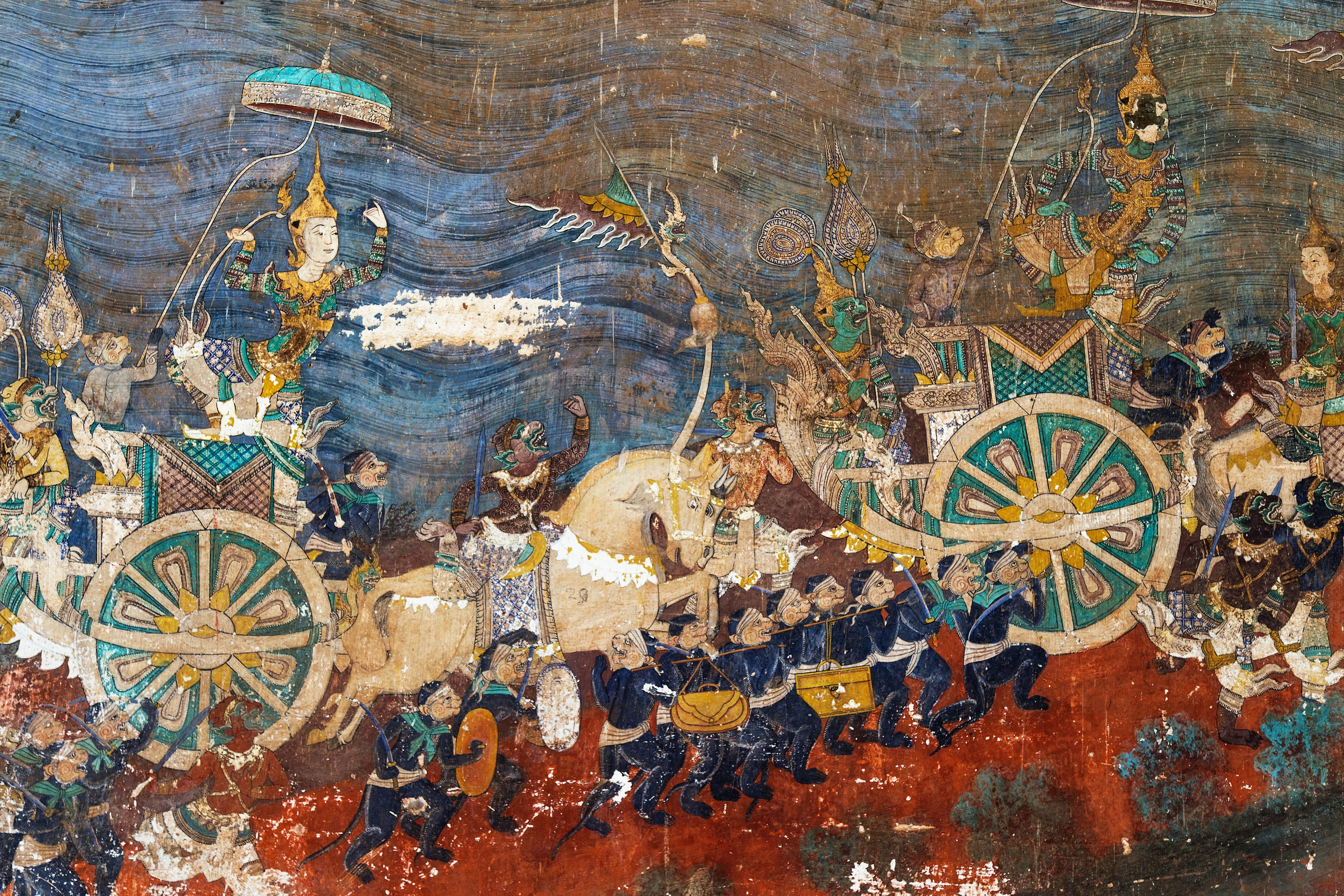
Mural depicting stories of the Reamker in Phnom Penh's Silver Pagoda

Reamker (Khmer: រាមកេរ្តិ៍, UNGEGN: Riam Ke, ALA-LC: Rāma Kirti; Khmer pronunciation: [riəm keː]) is a Cambodian epic poem, based on the Sanskrit's Rāmāyana epic. The name means "Glory of Rama". It is the national epic of Cambodia, along with the less famous version of the Trai Bhet. The earliest mention of this epic's manuscript in Cambodia dates back to the 7th century based on Veal Kantel inscription (K.359). The surviving text of Reamker dates from 16th century. Reamker adapts the Hindu ideas of the Ramayana to Buddhist themes and shows the balance of good and evil in the world. More than just a reordering of the epic tale, the Reamker is a mainstay of the royal ballet's repertoire. Like the Ramayana, it is a philosophical allegory, exploring the ideals of justice and fidelity as embodied by the protagonists, King Rāma and Queen Sītā. The epic is well known among the Khmer people for its portrayal in Khmer dance theatre, called the Lakhon (ល្ខោន lkhaôn), in various festivals across Cambodia. Scenes from the Reamker are painted on the walls of the Royal Palace in Khmer style, and its predecessor is carved into the walls of the Angkor Wat and Banteay Srei temples. It is considered an integral part of Cambodian culture.

The Reamker differs from the original Rāmāyana in some ways, featuring additional scenes and emphasis on Hanumān and Suvannamaccha.

In the Reamker, issues of trust, loyalty, love, and revenge play out in dramatic encounters among princes and giants, monkeys and mermaids, and a forlorn princess. Though it is understood that Preah Ream is an incarnation of the Hindu god Vishnu, his characteristics and those of the others in the story are interpreted in Cambodia as those of mere mortals, not of the gods as is the case in India. The complex interplay of strengths and weaknesses, though couched in episodes lined with magic, nonetheless represents a decidedly human social behavior.

As in other Southeast Asian countries, the Rāma story in Cambodia is not confined to the realm of literature but extends to all Cambodian art forms, from sculpture to dance drama, painting and art. Another epic, The Poem of Angkor Wat (ល្បើកអង្គរវត្ត Lbaeuk Ângkôr Vôtt), which dates from the beginning of the 17th century, celebrates the magnificent temple complex at Angkor and describes the bas-reliefs in the temple galleries that portray the Rāma story.

== History ==
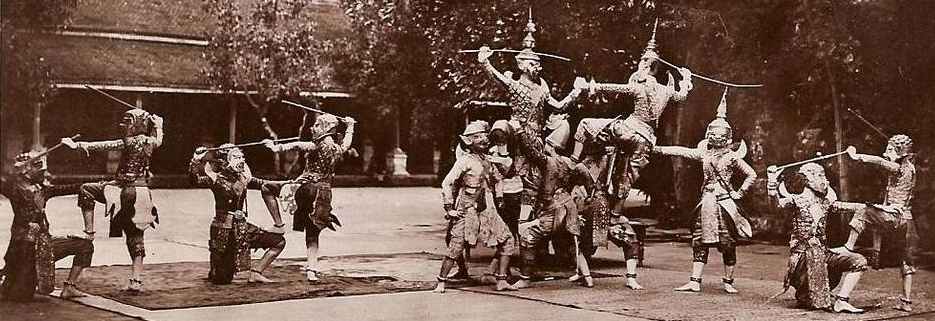
A scene from the Reamker; a battle between Rama and Ravana performed in the courtyard of the Silver Pagoda, c. 1900s~1920s

The original Ramayana arrived to Southeast Asia from South India along with Hinduism, but its retelling there suggests Buddhist influence.

The exact time when was Ramayana introduced to Cambodia is unknown, however, the earliest mentioning of the epic dated to 7th century according to a stone inscription at Veal Kantel, Stueng Treng. Based on the same inscription, the manuscript of this epic already existed in Cambodia as the inscription mentioned the offering of the epic's manuscript to a temple which expressed its importance in Khmer belief. On the other hand, the surviving text of Reamker dated in 16th century. Intricate carvings on the walls of Angkor Wat depict a scene from the Ramayana dating back nearly a millennium. Statues of the poem's heroes were worshiped in temple sanctuaries, akin to the wall paintings at Cambodia's Royal Palace and Wat Bo. The Ramayana has been an important epic in India for at least two thousand years, and Reamker is its Khmer adaptation. The Cambodian version includes incidents and details not found in the Sanskrit original. An example of a story that does not appear in Indian texts and performance is that of the encounter between Hanuman, the monkey general, and Sovanna Maccha, the mermaid, a favorite of Cambodian audiences.

== Literary Text of Reamker ==
The exact time or when was Ramaya or Reamker text existed in Cambodia is unknown. However, plenty of art works and inscriptions mentioning the epic were made throughout ancient Cambodia (Funan, Chenla, and Angkor). The earliest evidence regarding the presence of Ramayana text in Cambodia can be found in a 7th-century inscription of Veal Kantel (K.359), where it mentioned the offering of Mahabhrata and Ramayana manuscripts to the temple as well as the daily recitation of the texts.

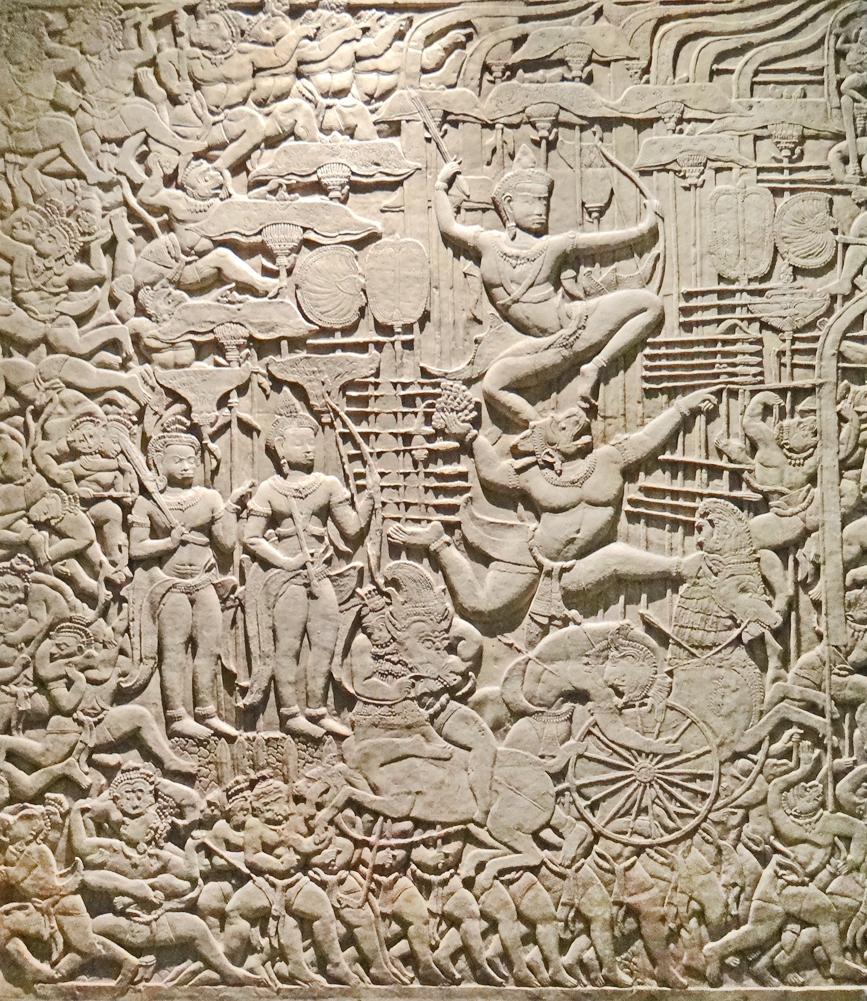
Bas-relief at Angkor Wat depicting the “Battle of Lanka”. Preah Ream (Rama) is standing on Hanuman, followed by his brother Preah Leak, and Piphek.

The Khmer version of Ramayana bears the name Reamker (Ramakerti)-literally means "The Glory of Rama". Indeed, the story of Rama is present in both art and literature throughout the history of Cambodia. Cambodian Ramayana contains some incidents that could not find in Valmiki's Ramayana. For instance, the episode of the destruction of Rama's causeway connecting Lanka by fishes and the reconstruction of this causeway as portrayed in a lintel of a Khmer temple at Phimai is believed to have emerged from a local development or the imagination of narrator. However, no literary work prior to 15th century has survived but numerous stone inscriptions or epigraphs have been preserved. From 15th century onward, the story of Rama became an impetus in Khmer literature, mainly in the epic genre, whereby the lengthy poems were composed as recitatives for the masked drama called Khol.

Poems narrating the story or the fame of Rama, called Reamker or Ramakerti appeared in the middle period of Khmer History. The surviving literary text of Reamker dated back to 16th century. This Reamker text was composed by at least three unknown authors over centuries and divided into two part.

The first part was composed between 16th to 17th century. The earliest writing accounts for about a fifth of the first part, covering the main events of the Bālakāṇḍa and Ayodhyakāṇḍa. It continued in the 17th century up to the episode where Ravana assembles the remnants of his army for the last battle with Rama. But the episode concerning Ravana's death, the rescue of Sita and her trial by fire, and the triumphant return to Ayodhya are all missing.

The second part of Reamker was composed in 18th century deals specifically with the later history of Rama and Sita. This part includes Sita's second rejection and exile, the birth of their two sons, the meeting again, and Sita's going down to the earth.

The Reamker differs from the original Ramayana in some ways, featuring additional scenes and emphasis on Hanuman and Sovanna Maccha in which this scene occurs during the construction of causeway connecting Lanka. This episode does not appear in the standard written version of Reamker, instead, Rama forces god of ocean Samudra to cooperate. The episode of Hanuman meeting Sovanna Maccha, however, appears in the Cambodian Royal Ballet repertoire and the Thai version of Ramayana - Ramakien, which was written down in 18th century, so it appears might be derived from folk versions of Reamker or be influenced by Ramakien.

Reamker is also mentioned in another literature called L'berk Angkor Wat (“The Story of Angkor Wat”) written in 1620 by Khmer author-Pang Tat (or Nak Pang), celebrating the magnificent temple complex of Angkor Wat and describing the bas-reliefs in the temple galleries that portray the Rama story.

In 1900s, Ta Krud and Ta Chak were the two old men famous for their remarkable memory and ability to narrate the whole Reamker story orally and beautifully with gesture. In 1920, Ta Chak found voluminous manuscripts of Reamker story on latanier leaves in a pagoda south of Angkor Wat temple during his monk-hood and he learnt to remember the script by heart. In 1969, Ta Chak's oral narration were recorded and his narration lasted 10 days at the rate of five hours per day. However, he died earlier before he could manage to narrate the remaining episodes.

Many versions of Reamker are available in Cambodia. Nowadays, Reamker is considered as Cambodian national epic which plays significant role in Cambodian literature and extends to all Cambodian art forms, from sculpture to dance drama, painting and art.

== Central plot ==
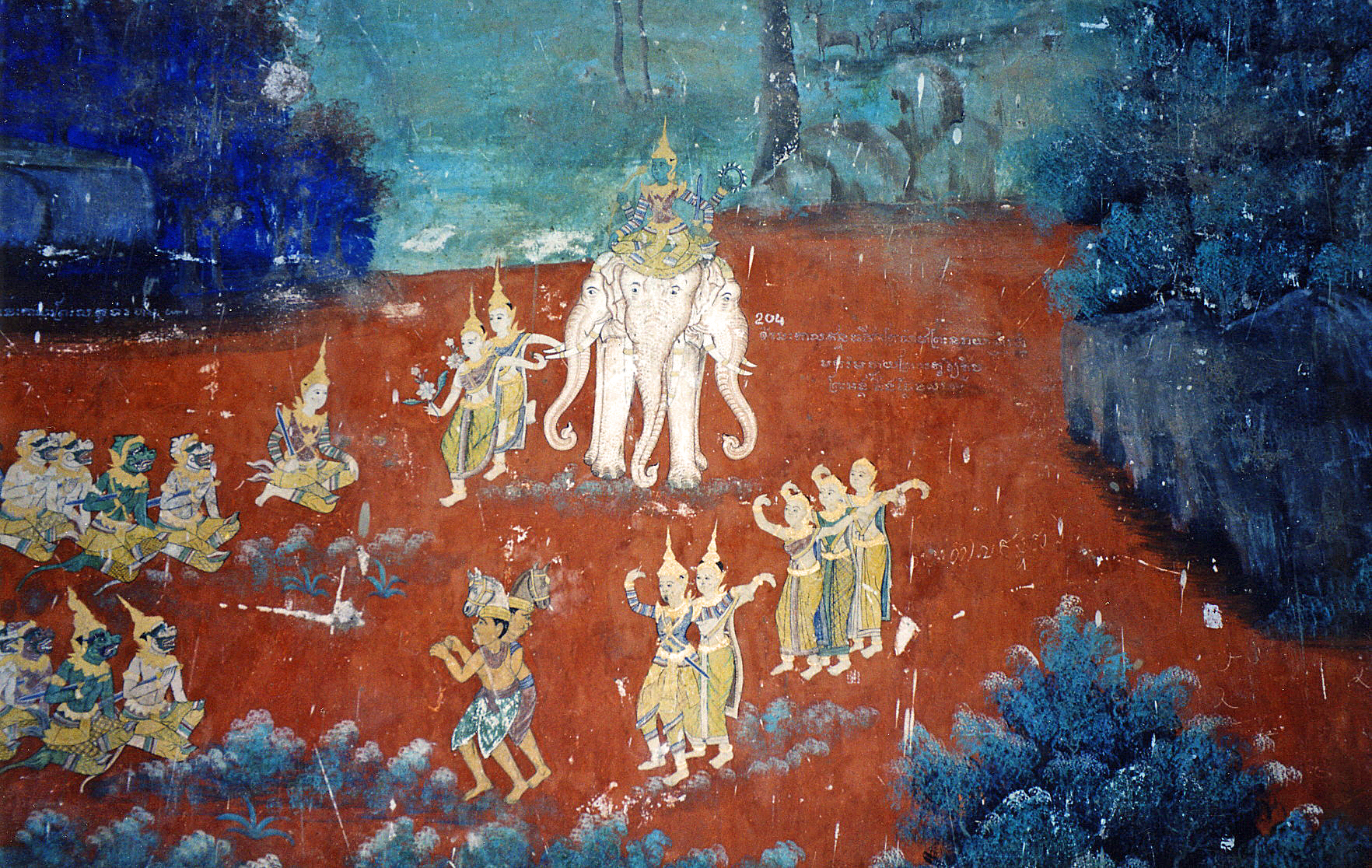
A scene depicting Indra on his mount, Airavata.

The Reamker plot begins with its protagonist, Preah Ream or Rama, being sent into exile by one of the queen mothers who wanted her own son to inherit the throne. After being sent to the forest, Preah Ream is joined by his beautiful and faithful wife Neang Seda (Sita), whom the prince won from her father by being the only Prince who successfully completed the father's challenge of firing arrows through a spinning wheel with spokes. Preah Leak (Lakshmana), the younger brother of Preah Ream, is concerned about his older brother and joins Neang Seda.

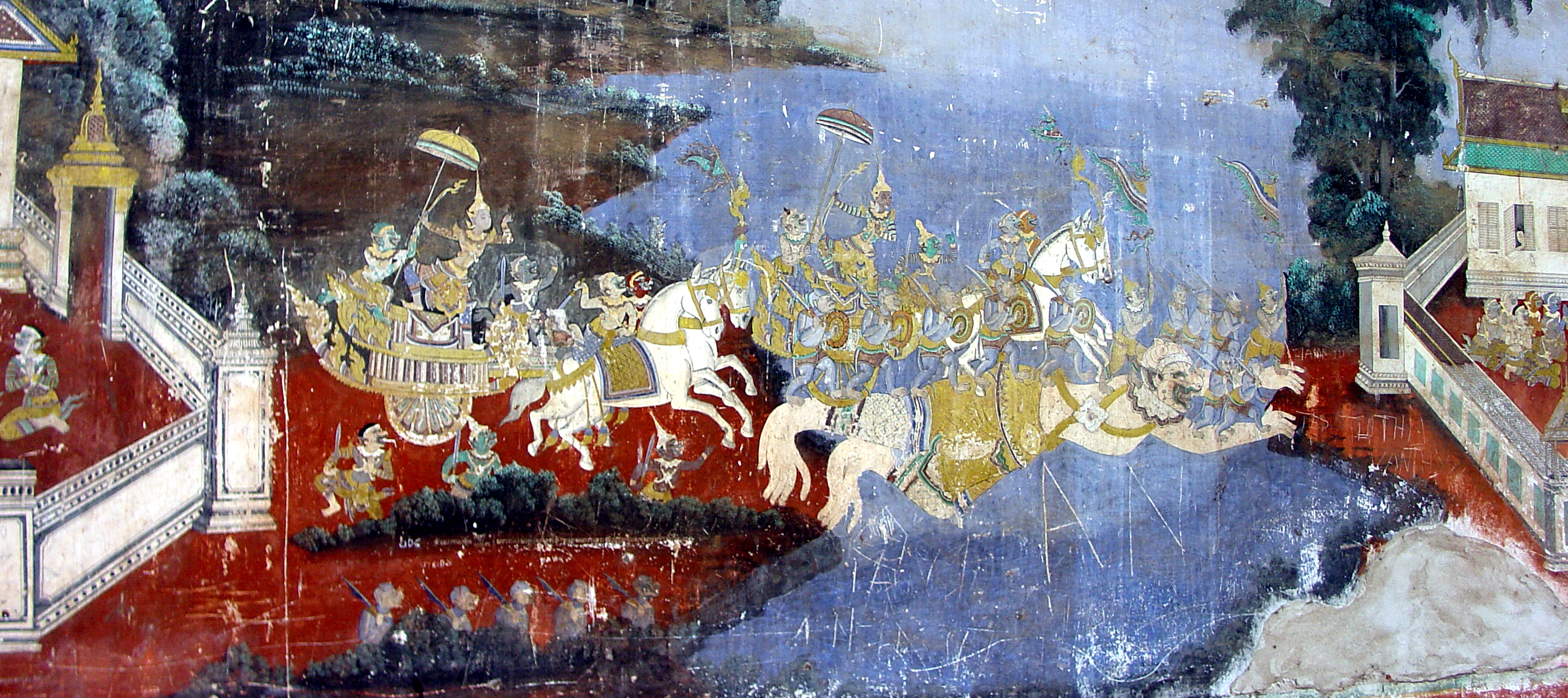
Mural depicting Preah Ream (Rama) and Preah Leak (Lakshmana), under royal umbrellas, crossing over to Lanka with their monkey army on the back of a giant.

While entering the forest, Neang Seda and Preah Leak meet the rakshasi Surapanakhar (Surphanakha) who first attempts to seduce Preah Ream, and then Preah Leak. Preah Leak, annoyed by the demon's action, cuts off her ear and nose. The butchered Surapanakhar thirsting for revenge went to her ten-headed brother Krong Reap (Ravana), invincible lord of the island of Lanka. Krong Reap secretly goes to the forest with his uncle Mohareech (Maricha). When he first set eyes on Neang Seda, he was awed by her divine beauty. Krong Reap orders Mohareech to transform as a golden deer and runs past the party of three. Preah Ream realizes that the deer is not a real deer, however, at Neang Seda's insistence Preah Ream chases it after telling his younger brother to stay and guard his wife. Mohareech then mimics Preah Ream's voice and calls for his brother to come and save him. Although Preah Leak knows that it is not his brother calling out, he is forced to go at Neang Seda's insistence. However, before he leaves he draws a magical circle around his brother's wife in the dirt that will prevent anything from entering the circle. Krong Reap, after waiting for Preah Leak to leave, disguises himself as an old errant and easily tricks Neang Seda's to step outside the circle, after which he abducts her. Preah Ream and Preah Leak return and desperately search for Neang Seda and, in the meantime, they assist the monkey king Sokreep (Sugriva) to destroy his rival Peali (Vali) and regain his throne. Thanking the two, Sokreep sends the monkey warrior Hanuman to aid them in their search. Hanuman, the son of the wind god, flies out to discover that the demon Krong Reap held Neang Seda prisoner on the island of Lanka.

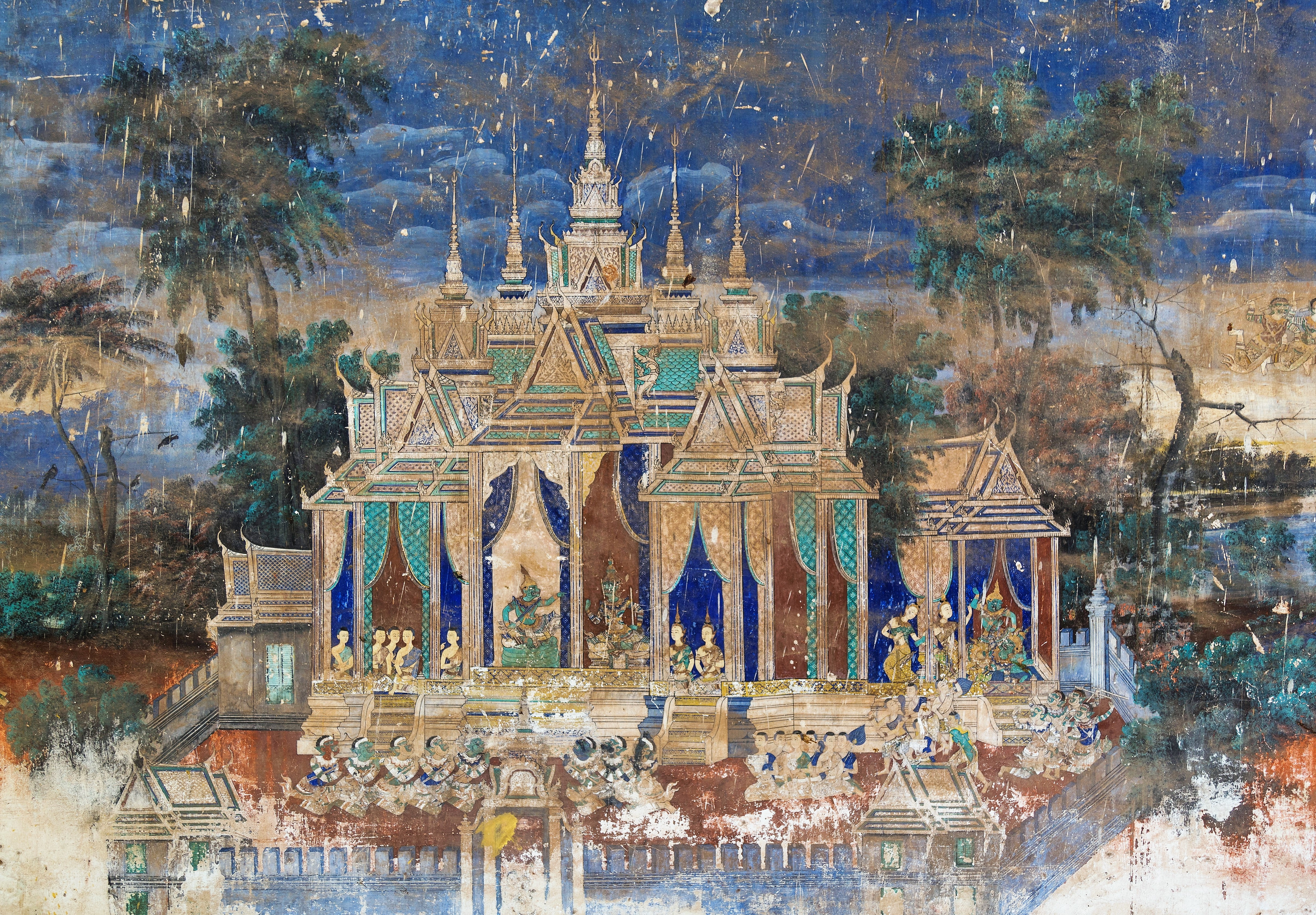
Krong Reap and his subordinates in Lanka

Hanuman orders his soldiers, under the advice of Piphek who joined Preah Ream's army earlier, to build a bridge of stone to connect the island Lanka to the mainland. While gathering stones, Hanuman realizes that mermaids were stealing stones to prevent the construction of the bridge. He was roused by this and decides to capture the mermaid princess Neang Sovanna Macchha but falls deeply in love with her. The mermaid likewise falls in love, and thus her mermaid army ceases to tamper in Hanuman's business. The bridge built, Preah Ream and Krong Reap face each other in combat. However, Krong Reap quickly regenerates and damage done to him or any body part that is cut off. It is not until one of Krong Reap's generals defects and discloses the secret to slaying the demon - an arrow in the belly button. With Hanuman's aid, they slay the demon. Preah Ream, victorious in his battles, returns to the capital of Ayuthyea and ascends the throne. Preah Ream suspects infidelity as his wife was captive of a very smart and manipulative demon. Trust issues between him and his wife Neang Seda arise after his wife draws a picture of Krong Reap at the insistence of her maid servant (as the demon's true face was said to be the ugliest face there was). Fearing her husband's jealousy, Neang Seda puts the picture under the mattress when she is unexpectedly interrupted. Krong Reap's power extends to the picture and that night spikes grow from it and poke Preah Ream through the mattress. He discovers the picture and believes that it confirms his suspicion that his wife succumbed to Krong Reap's persistent attempts to bed her over the years that she was held prisoner. However, Neang Seda had resisted all Krong Reap's attempts, even that in which Krong Reap transformed himself into her husband. Only his scent had given his disguise away. Preah Ream forces his wife to take the trial of fire to prove she is still pure. Neang Seda passes the test. However, Neang Seda is deeply offended by her husband's lack of trust in her and his lack of belief in her word. She decides to leave and find refuge with Vacchapret the wiseman, where she gives birth to twin boys. They met their father and he immediately recognizes who they are and takes them to his palace.

== Characters ==
=== Humans ===
- Preah Ream [preəh riːəm], is the main protagonist of the epic. He is believed to be the reincarnation of the Hindu deity Vishnu and the husband of Neang Seda and the father of two boys.
- Neang Seda [niːəɳ seːda], the female protagonist of the epic and wife of Preah Ream. She gives birth to his two children, but fails to meet happiness at the end of the story. In the epic, she endured the trial of fire.
- Preah Leak [preəh leək], is the brother of Preah Ream and his aid to fight Krong Reap and rescue Neang Seda.

=== Mythical beings ===
- Krong Reap [kroɳ riːəp] or simply Reap [riːəp], is the main antagonist of the story. He is the brother of Sopphanakha and captured the beautiful Neang Seda to his island of Langka.
- Piphek, brother of Krong Reap, is the demon astrologer and royal advisor of Lanka's royal court who soon joins Preah Ream's army and helps the prince defeat his own brother.
- Hanuman, pronounced as [haʔnomaːn], is the Monkey Warrior who helps rescue Neang Seda. While building the bridge connecting the island of Langka to the mainland, he fell madly in love with the mermaid Princess Sovanna Maccha.
- Neang Maccha, is a mermaid princess who tried to spoil Hanuman's plans to build a bridge to Langka but fell in love with him instead and bears his son Macchanu.
- Sokreep is the Monkey King who sent Hanuman to assist Preah Ream.
- Surapanakkhar is the sister of Krong Reap. She failed to seduce Preah Leak and loses her ear and nose as a consequence.
- Mahachompoo is the king of the kingdom of Chompoo and helps Preah Ream fight Krong Reap to reclaim Neang Seda with his 18 monkey army
- Angkut is the cousin of Hanuman and son of Peali. He helps Preah Ream fight Krong Reap.

== See also ==
- Ramayana
- Ramakien
- Phra Lak Phra Lam
- Hikayat Seri Rama
- Khmer classical dance
- Dance of Cambodia
- Culture of Cambodia
- Greater India
- Kakawin Ramayana
