= Gatilok =

Cambodian novel of the French colonial era

- Author: Suttantaprija Ind
- Original title: គតិលោក ឬ ច្បាប់ទូន្មានខ្លួន
- Language: Khmer
- Genre: Fable
- Publication date: 1914-1921
- Publication place: Cambodia
- Media type: Serialized print (Paperback)

Gatilok (Khmer: គតិលោក ឬ ច្បាប់ទូន្មានខ្លួន) or Kotelok is a collection of 112 folktales in Khmer language, stories and poems collected by Suttantaprija Ind known as Achar Ind, a notorious Khmer intellectual during the French protectorate of Cambodia. Written at the beginning of the 20th century as a guide as to how to behave in society, it has become a classic of Khmer literature.

== Title ==
"Gatiloka", which is translated as "The Ways of the World", is traditionally a Pali term that refers to the types of existence into which men and women can reincarnate within the divine, human, animal and hell worlds. For Ind, this term "is reinterpreted as the 'ways' of acting or behaving in the immediate present". The title is also followed by a subtitle, Law for how to behave oneself, explaining the content of the work.

== Content ==
In order to compose the Gatilok, Achar Ind selected from either Khmer sources, Indian sources imported through Thailand such as the Jataka, the Panchatantra or the Hitopadesha, or French literature such as in Les Fables de Lafontaine in what Khmer scholar Khing Hoc Dy considers an "elegant symbiosis of khmer and foreign culture".

Some stories included in the Gatilok have allowed stories from the Trai Bhet, an outdated Khmer cosmogony, to survive in mainstream classic literature. One such story recounts the corrupt desire of a mother of a bodhisattva to kill her son out of lust for one of his students; warned by his student, the bodhisattva places a dummy made from bananas in his bed and catches his evil mother red-handed, who dies of shame, before being cremated, as if she was burnt by the fire of her passions.

== History ==
Gatilok was composed between 1914 and 1921, a period during which Achar Ind was living in Phnom Penh.

=== A listening-to newspaper gazette ===
Achar Ind's famous collection of traditional stories, Gatilok, was one of the first examples of a collection written for serialization in a periodical in modern Khmer literature. Although the periodical had fairly low circulation figures, it became common for monks to read out sections during sermons and other public events, as Khmer people would enjoy this new form of literature as "listening to newspapers" (sdap-kaset).

=== A lasting literary genre ===
Gatilok, in its subtitle "Law for how to behave oneself", had a lasting influence on Cambodian literature and society so much so that more than one palimpsest was published thereafter. While Khmer moral treatises known as tunmeay used to describe a "Gargantuan cosmogony", Achar Ind updated the genre and made it modern and appealing to Khmer readers. In the wake of the Sangkum era, writers such as Khun Srun wrote updated guidelines with the same title.

== Analysis ==
=== A lesson of court étiquette ===
Achar Ind wrote fables and fairy tales in which he recorded the experiences he gained in the civil service and at court. As a vernacular Theravada Buddhist text, it relates more to the "little" Buddhist tradition. The Gatilok is concerned with sâtisampajania, the practical application of moral judgment. The word sâtisampajania is composed of sati, meaning "mindfulness and clarity", and sampajañña, meaning "discrimination" or "attention" or "awareness".

In the context of a fast-changing urban society in Cambodian cities influenced by the Western world and the modernization of the royal Khmer court, the main question asked by this series of narratives could be condensed as: "how to behave as good Khmer Buddhists and moral persons, and simultaneously, how to purify themselves in the context of everyday life in a modernizing world"? To do this, Khmer teachers innovated through their translation and teaching methods which also encourage the dissemination of knowledge on a larger scale, particularly to lay people, through printed rather than handwritten textual productions. In the Gatilok of Ind, this methodology is based on Buddhist literary conventions that advocate storytelling as a mode of critical reflection. Indeed, after having presented the teachings of the Buddha by selecting extracts from traditional texts, a commentary for the attention of the reader is written in the form of narration (sometimes also in prose or verse) with the aim of initiating reflection and guide him in analyzing the meaning of the previous extract. This is why Hansen conceives of Gatilok as a kind of "moral laboratory", where the reader is called to apply his critical reflections to his own life.

=== A satire of Khmer society ===
Khmer writer Tauch Chhuong explains how the Gatilok, one of the major works of Ind, meticulously describes life in Battambang during the era of Governor Kathathan Chhum. Ind is then very well known in the region. The local intelligentsia as well as ordinary Cambodians often come to listen to him speak, and his writings are widely circulated. Hansen explains that in addition to outlining the contours of moral conduct applicable to lay people, Gatilok is intended to be a means for Ind to offer social criticism. For example, Achar Ind criticizes the cult of various Brahmanical deities such as the sacred cow (Preah Ko) and grandmother Daeb (yày daeb), arguing that "since we are lay followers of the religion of the Buddha it is not right to venerate [these statues]."

=== A pamphlet against the French occupation ===
Beyond a self-critique, some have read between the lines of the fables of the Gatilok, and found a nationalist pamphlet, in veiled opposition against the French protectorate. This can be seen through the recourse of the theme of the anti-opium crusade in parallel of the Opium Wars in China, which eventually took on an anti-French flavor also in Cambodia. The theme is taken up in Ind's famous collection of stories, Gatilok, particularly in the tale of the "Oknya who smoked opium who used his influence to harm inhabitants of the region".

Veiled references in a story contrasting the lives of free wild dogs and enslaved domesticated dogs were clearly meant to rebuke Khmer officials aligning themselves too closely with the French protectorate.

— Anne Hansen, Narrative, Sub-Ethics, and the Moral Life: Some Evidence from Theravāda Buddhism
