= Trai Bhet =

Treatise on Khmer cosmogony

The Trai Bhet (Khmer: ត្រៃត្រៃភេទ, romanized: Trai Phet, Khmer pronunciation: [traj pʰeːt]; lit. 'three vedas') is a treatise on Khmer cosmogony composed at the latest at the end of the 17th century. As one of Cambodia's national epics, it is another Khmer version of the Hindu epic Ramayana, different again from the Khmer Reamker. The Trai Bhet is an important part of the Khmer literary canon, though it has largely been forgotten.

== History ==
=== 17th-18th century ===
George Cœdès dates the Trai Bhet to the 17th/18th centuries, noting that, along with the Reamker, the text is a valuable example of a genre of Cambodian religious literature that has almost disappeared. According to Pou Saveros, the colophon of one of the Trai Bhet manuscripts, identified as Ms. 107 by the French School of the Far East, is dated in the year 1619 saka which would match the year 1687 AD. The Trai Bhet gives some insight into the ideas held about the earth deity during the Cambodia's Middle Period, and sheds some light on the connection between the earth deity Phra Mae Thorani and the epic Ramayana.

=== 19th century ===
In 1899, French ethnographer Adhémard Leclère published a translation of two ancient works of Cambododian literature copied from Khmer manuscripts, namely the Preah Dhamma Chhean, and the Trai Bhet. At the end of the 19th century, such cosmological treatises were common in monastic libraries throughout Cambodia and neighboring regions. Although these rather dry texts were not used ritually or preached in sermons, they were considered sacred, and were studied by monks. However, Leclère notes that under the influence of Singhalese monks and Khmer novices who travelled to Sri Lanka in order to learn Pali language, the Trai Bhet was set aside as non-canonical scripture.

=== 20th century ===
By the 20th century, the influence of Buddhist reform movements meant that the Trai Bhet was held to be less than authoritative. While manuscripts were located in many monasteries at the beginning of the 20th century by Adhémard Leclère, after the cultural genocide directed by the Khmer Rouge, only two copies of the Trai Bhet were located in Cambodia by French archeologist Olivier de Bernon. This scarcity may also be attributed to the fact that the Trai Bhet had not been copied for many years.

== Content ==
According to Olivier de Bernon, the Trai Bhet is a Khmer literary classic of which nothing else than the title is known, as it has not been studies for years, if not centuries. Commentators are therefore not unanimous as to the nature of its content. It is best read as a cosmogonic preamble to the legend of Rama followed by a presentation of the genealogy of the main protagonists in relation with the narrative of their legendary birth. The text is therefore divided into four parts: cosmogonic genesis, cosmological elements, genealogy of the main protagonists, legend of Rama.

=== Division ===
While the canonical division of the Vedas is fourfold including the Rigveda, Yajurveda, Samaveda and the Atharvaveda, the first three were the principal original division, also called "trayī vidyā", known as "Trai Beda" in the Thai collection gathered by King Rama VI at the beginning of the 20th century. This "triple science" of reciting hymns (Rigveda), performing sacrifices (Yajurveda), and chanting songs (Samaveda) however is totally different in content from the Trai Bhet, despite their titles sounding similar.

=== Connection to Ramayana ===
The Trai Bhet is closely related to the Ramayana as its text narratives may be read synoptically with some overlap. The names of the protagonists however are systematically different. What's more, the Trai Bhet starts with a peculiar genesis of deities and personified elements, before becoming a vague tale of the Rama epic.

=== Cosmogony controversy ===
Many Cambodians believe that the Trai Bhet contains "Brahmanical" rather than "Buddhist" ideas, and by and large they have not been re-copied, and are no longer studied. In fact, the Trai Bhet describes an unorthodox cosmogony which may have been set aside as the Thommayut gradually purified the corpus of religious texts in Cambodia reining in on esoteric rituals and black magic. Myths and legends found in the Trai Bhet, such as the earth-goddess Phra Mae Thorani, still have a strong popularity in Khmer folk religion, especially through inclusions of some of its narratives in the Gatilok, despite having been ousted from the literary corpus.

== Iconography ==
Unique paintings in Wat Bo monastery in Siem Reap, presumably based on the first part of the Trai Bhet, help to understand the Khmer cosmogony somewhat better.
