= Achar Khmer =

Lay ritual specialist in Cambodia

An achar (Khmer: អាចារ្យ, achary [ʔaːcaː]) or achar wat (Khmer: អាចារ្យវត្ត, achary vôtt [ʔaːcaː ʋŏət]) is a lay Buddhist upāsaka who becomes a ritual specialist and takes on the role of master of ceremonies in various religious rites in Cambodia.

== Etymology ==
The term achar comes from acharya (Sanskrit: आचार्य, IAST: ācārya; Pali: acariya): in Indian religions and society, the acharya is a preceptor and expert instructor in matters such as religion, or any other subject.

"That priest who girds his pupil with the sacrificial word, and afterwards instructs him in the whole Veda, with the law of sacrifice and the sacred Upanishads, holy sages called an acharya."

— Manu, Manusmriti, Chapter II "On Education", verse 140.

Prominent acharya figures in India include Madhvacharya or Vallabhacharya.

The equivalent in Thai, ajahn, which comes from the same root, is used as an honorific title of address for high-school and university teachers, and for Buddhist monks who have passed ten vassa years in the vihāra monastery considered as "Venerable" (phra ajahn (Thai: พระอาจารย์, "venerable monk"). The latter is similar in meaning to the Japanese sensei.

== History ==
While the term achar has been used since Angkorian times to refer to the master of ceremonies, the figure of the achar has emerged in its contemporary form in close relationship with the movement for the Independence of Cambodia since the 19th and 20th century.

=== From acharya to achar: rupture and continuity with vedic sacrifices of the Angkorian period ===
For French ethnologist Jean Moura, there is "no doubt" that the achar, like the baku, was a brahmin of earlier ages. In the historical Vedic religion, the sacrifice of fire or agnihotra in honour of Agni, the god of fire, was the simplest public rite, and the head of every Brahmin and Vaishya family was required to conduct it twice daily. In Khmer, the master of ceremonies in such occasions was known as the hotachar (ហុតាចារ្យ), corresponding to the acchāvāka of the vedic priesthood as described in the systematic expositions of the shrauta sutras, which date to the fifth or sixth century BC.

To this day, many rites, as well as occult practises, accomplished specifically by the achar in Cambodia contain various elements of brahmanism and primitive religion.

However, in modern days, many achar have rejected the vedic rites and worship of idols as unworthy of the Buddhist practitioner. Achar Ind criticizes the cult of various Brahmanical deities such as the sacred cow (Preah Ko) and grandmother Daeb (yày daeb), arguing that "since we are lay followers of the religion of the Buddha it is not right to venerate [these statues]."

=== The achar and the movement for the Independence of Cambodia ===
Since 1864 and the beginning of the French protectorate of Cambodia, the achar in Cambodia have frequently been associated with political activism, which was common for lay Buddhist scholars in other countries as well as for in example in Nepal with Dharmaditya Dharmacharya.

==== Insurrection of Achar Sua (1864–1866) ====
Hardly a year after the signature of the treaty establishing the French protectorate of Cambodia, the first insurrection started led by an achar. A former monk, Achar Sua raised an army, pillaged Kampot and marched on Phnom Penh. Confronted by the troops sent against him by King Norodom, Achar Sua found refuge in a pagoda where he was killed in August 1866.

==== Revolt of Po Kambo or Achar Leak (1865–1867) ====
In 1865, a more serious revolt against Norodom and his French "protectors" was incited by Po Kambo who was also known as Achar Leak. As a former monk, he gained the following of some ten thousand, including monks in robes and various holy men (neak sel) . Pou Kambo was first arrested in Tayninh on 23 April 1865. After escaping from his prison in Saigon, he rallied the support of Khmer and Cham peasants as well as Kui and Stieng minorities from the mountains in the northeast of Cambodia. Fuelled by millenarian beliefs, he gathered support by promising to rescind the confiscatory taxation policies put in place by the Protectorate. His forces killed the governor of Kratié and Sambor, 17 French soldiers. In October 1866, with more than 6,000 men, Pou Kambo defeated the royal forces near Ba Phnom and killed the Cambodian navy minister. More recruits kept coming and in November 1866, Pou Kambo marched on Oudong and Phnom Penh. On 9 January 1867, his troops attacked the Christian village of Moat Krosas in the south of Phnom Penh and assassinated Father Jean-Baptiste Barreau, beheading him and putting his head on a spike. Having rallied support at Wat Phnom, Phnom Penh, Po Kambo was forced to retread with some followers at a monastery in Kampong Thom Province where they were attacked in November 1867: Pou Kambo was eventually captured and beheaded.

==== Battambang uprising of 1898 and the poem of Achar Ind (1898) ====
In 1898, cardamom collectors in Battambang Province rebelled against the high taxes imposed during the period of Thai control. The rebels were led by a certain Ta Kae and his associate, a Vietnamese magician-monk called Sau. Achar Ind, a prominent Battambang-based intellectual, praised the uprising in the popular poem The Battle of Ta Kae in the Cardamom Mountains.

==== Achar nationalism: between Buddhist millenarism and social conservatism ====
The achar who encouraged the movement for the independence of Cambodia were caught between Buddhist millenarism and its violent tendency on one hand and their social conservatism on the other hand.

Thus, in 1898, in Wat Prabat Chean Chûm near Phnom Rovieng, a millienarist movement led by Ngo Prep was supported by Achar Ke. Believing that Preah Bat Thommit (the future Buddha, Maitreya) would be reborn and establish a millennial kingdom in 1899, Ngo Prep proclaimed a new unified state in which the Cambodian king and the French would serve as the future Buddha's lieutenants of the left and the right, while he would assume the role of lieutenant of the middle. The army intervened and broke into the monastery. Forty-one individuals were arrested, including two chau adhikar, with monks and achars composing a significant proportion of the total.

Yet, this activism and violence was not supported by every achar in Cambodia and it was even strongly criticized. Achar Ind, for example, looking back at the insurrections of his youth, comments that figures like the "contemptible" Po Kambo and Achar Sau were guilty of lèse-majesté. They were "awful persons [who] ... incite poor people and forest people to raise up an army to betray the king".

==== The Umbrella War of 1942 and the role of Achar Hiem Chieu ====
Nationalist feeling had been rising significantly since the loss of Battambang and Siem Reap provinces to Thailand in 1941.

In response, Hem Chieu, a teacher at the École Supérieure de Pali and monk of Wat Ounalom, defended a nationalist agenda in favour of khmerization. He was the presumed leader of the Association of the Black Star (samakom phkay khmau), an occult anti-French and anti-Japanese movement with supposed links to the Issaraks and the Democratic Party. He was forcibly defrocked and arrested on July 17, 1942, as a monk could not traditionally be detained by the secular power only after first being allowed to disrobe in a ceremony organized by the sangha. More than a thousand people, around half of whom were monks, participated in the demonstration of July 20 for Hiem Chieu. Because they carried umbrellas, the event is sometimes termed the Umbrella War. Finally, he was charged with involvement in organized opposition groups and with translating seditious material from Thai. Found guilty on both charges, he was imprisoned on the penitentiary of Poulo Condor, where he died in 1943 at the age of forty-six. Having been defrocked, he was no longer a Venerable bhikkhu, but he became one of the most prominent achar of the movement toward independence.

Achar Pres seems to have fled to the Cardamom Mountains in southern Battambang immediately after the demonstrations, to "wake up the people" so that they might launch a coordinated and sustained resistance to the French.

=== From factionalism to communism ===
Factionalism within the monastic order as different tendencies emerged with conflicting ideas as to the best way to defend the Khmer nation: some of the achar defending traditionalism and attachment to Buddhist values, others siding with the new-born Communist party. In June 1949, Achar Yi led a group of rebels in Kandal and Prey Veng provinces. Yi was "a quack sorcerer" according to colonial sources and he even burned Buddhist sacred writings, and in some cases the wats themselves, if he believed their monastic residents had been supporting modernization within the Mahanikay. The governor of Kandal seems to have feared that such acts of desecration might lead to wider conflict between sangha traditionalists and modernists. Nevertheless, a document of the Communist Party of Kampuchea (CPK) from the early 1970s describes Achar Yi as a "counterrevolutionary".

Also known as Achar Mean, Son Ngoc Minh had been a Pali teacher at Wat Ounalom, in Phnom Penh, and had fled to Wat Yeay Tep, in Kompong Chhnang Province, after the Umbrella War of 1942. Minh was admitted to the International Communist Party in September 1945 and by March of the following year was commanding a Vietnamese-backed resistance group in Battambang that was designed to draw French forces away from southern Vietnam. At some stage he was joined by a fellow Khmer from Kampuchea Krom called Tou Samouth, also known as Achar Sok.

Among the revolutionary groups, Achar Hiem Chieu was exalted as a martyr. In June 1950, a political school named after him was established in the southwest. A group calling itself the Achar Hem Chieu Unit was held responsible for the assassination of the governor of Prey Veng in February 1953.

=== Cambodia Year Zero: the persecution of the achar under the Khmers Rouges and the "new religion" ===
From 1976 to 1979, no religious activities were allowed by the communist Khmers Rouges and the achar, as all the representatives of buddhism, were persecuted if they held on their religious practise. Some other achars however, became cadres of the Democratic Kampuchea, and even believed that they were doing the "revolution according to a new religion".

=== Rewriting Cambodian History to adapt it to a new political context: the achar as a national hero (1979–1991) ===
After 1979, the Kampuchean People's Revolutionary Party began rewriting Cambodian History to adapt it to a new political context, and this included appraisal of the various nationalist achar. The Fourth Congress of the party in June 1981 resolved that "the United Front for the National Salvation of Kampuchea must be constantly enlarged and developed and must have a political line acceptable to each social layer, in particular the monks, intellectuals, the ethnic minorities." In September of the same year Ven. Tep Vong was "elected" head of a unified monastic order. Administrative posts were also created at the provincial and village levels, with village presidents effectively acting as the pre-1975 achar.

In 1982 Heng Samrin, now general secretary of the KPRP, addressed the First National Buddhist Monks Congress, at which he extolled Cambodian Buddhism as a religion in harmony with democratic principles. He also praised the positive contribution of Buddhists to society, particularly those with a nationalist outlook such as Achar Mean (Son Ngoc Minh) and Achar Hem Chieu.

In due course an official document, entitled Buddhism and the Fatherland defined the correct relationship between religion and state and among those conditions was to preserve and cultivate the patriotic and revolutionary spirit exemplified by Achar Hem Chieu and Achar Mean.

=== The important role of the achar in the revival of Buddhism since the fall of communism ===
In the aftermath of the Khmers Rouge, a significant proportion of contemporary achars appear to have been monks forcibly defrocked during the Democratic Kampuchea period. Others were ex-Khmers Rouges or had ties to the Democratic Kampuchea, having some wonder if the participation of "immoral elders" in the public role of achar was not an obstacle to restoring order and justice in Cambodia.

In 2011, Prime Minister Hun Sen called for comprehensive achar training sessions and unified training manuals to offer a unified information on achar ceremonial duties and community roles. Since the founding in February 2011 of the Department of Research, Promotion of Buddhism and Connection to Society at the Ministry for Cult and Religion, the department has conducted training sessions to instruct over 4,000 achars.

== Classification ==
Achar can apply as an honorary title to a wide variety of people, roles and responsibilities linked to the office of teaching and performing rites. According to Chuon Nath, the achar can be divided into five different groups:

- Bopachar (បព្វជ្ជាចារ្យ ) is a bhikkhu monk who introduces his children to the sangha to become novices;
- Upamsampatachar (ឧបសម្បទាចារ្យ) is the master who does the official proclamation in the regular assembly of the bhikkhus to announce that a novice will become a bhikkhu. He is sometimes referred to as a teacher of sutras;
- Oteachar (ឧទ្ទេសាចារ្យ) is the Pali teacher;
- Nisayachar (និស្សយាចារ្យ ) is the bikku which a novice chooses as a master when he comes into residence in a pagoda.
- Thomachar or Dhammacharya (ធម្មាចារ្យ) is a teacher of dharma or teaching knowledge of various arts.

However, achar applies to other situations not included above, such as the achar kamathan (អាចារ្យកម្មដ្ធាន) who is a master of meditation.

The second figure in the Thommayut hierarchy is also known as the Mongol tepeachar (mangaladevàcàrya). For example, Keo Uch (1889–1968) was chau adhikar of Wat Botum or more recently Venerable Oum Som (1918–2000), the Maha Nikaya chief monk of Wat Moha Montrey in Phnom Penh.

To confuse matters somewhat, graduates of the Pali school in Phnom Penh are also awarded the title "achar." As a consequence they are permitted to carry a special fan.

Nevertheless, achar in its generic form has become, in Khmer language, the colloquial term to designate outside the sangha the lay specialist, often a former monk, who is given important responsibilities in daily life both within and outside the pagoda.

== Duties ==
The achar takes on the role of a master of ceremonies for seven major annual festivals in Cambodia, many of which have pre-Angkorian origins. Whereas the achar officiate at all major rites of passage, the sangha is far less involved in ceremonies relating to birth, marriage, and adult initiation.

Particularly elaborate ceremonies may involve as many as nine achar.

=== Measuring time through astrology: the declining role of the achar hora ===
It is not uncommon for a traditional achar to act as astrologer (hora), and many monasteries once contained a good range of works on the subject in their libraries. However, those with modernist tendencies scrupulously avoid all reference to magic and related arts

=== Inauguration of a new pagoda: encircling the sima ===
The achar has an important role to play in the ritual for establishing a khandasima (thvoeu bon banchho sema): this rite, which points to an archaic and sacrificial origin for the rite, is thought to be highly meritorious and is one of the most popular of Cambodian festivities. Although monks are involved and recite relevant passages of scripture, the ceremony is actually led by an achar. Altars are erected to various directional deities at the eight positions around the vihàra. The achar encircles the altars and their offerings with a protective thread of cotton before pits are dug. Offerings, such as shards of mirror, perfumed water, hair, nail clippings, musical instruments, or money, are thrown into the pit to make merit. Those present may also cut their finger to allow a few drops of blood to drip in before a circular block of stone, consecrated the previous night.

=== Khmer traditional wedding: the achar kar ===
In the Khmer traditional wedding, the achar kar, or wedding achar, plays the principal role and directs the ceremony. In setting the date and pre-wedding arrangements, the achar kar can be referred to as a moha. However, the three-day long ritual which was the norm before the Khmers rouges is no longer upheld by the achar kar and it is common to find achar kar who ignore the meaning of the rites they celebrate.

=== Funeral rites: the achar yogi ===
The achar or achar yogi also known as the achar khmaoch plays a key role in the celebration of Khmer funerary rites. Even before a person dies, Buddhist monks and the achar come to the home to chant smot. Immediately after death the achar lights the candle, which is later used to kindle the funeral pyre. The whole funeral is under the guidance of this achar yogi.

The achar yogiis also involved in the post-mortem "turning the body" (pre rup). The ritual is conducted by an achar yogi who carries a banner (tung braling), and a cooking pot.

As such, funerary rites celebrated by the achar yogi are connected with an esoteric or initiatory yogavacara tradition.

=== Esoteric rituals: the Khmer achar and practise of the yogavacara ===
The achar is usually linked to a spiritual tradition which materializes itself through various non-Buddhist esoteric rites which were described as superstitions by French ethnologist Etienne Aymonier in 1883. These practises vary widely from apotropaic rites after the fall of a kite on a house to incense offering and prostrations before an image of the earth goddess, Neang Thorani. As there are no formal schools for the achar, these beliefs are transmitted through a form of esoteric archaic, perhaps even pre-Buddhist, initiation: in 1938, a certain Achar Uong had a total of twenty-eight disciples at his base on Phnom Damrei Roniel, Ang Ta Som District, Takeo Province.

As such, the achar vat keep close ties with the kru khmer and other representatives of esoteric practises such as the dhmap practitioners of black magic in Cambodia. When most other gru enter a Buddhist monastery, they put their healing powers on hold and accept the role of an achar.

== Characteristics ==
=== Attire: black and white ===
An achar usually wears black pants, a white shirt, and a krama.

His black pants, wrapped around the waist with ribbons tied to form a belt while excess material is folded over the knot, are known as "five-stitched rowing pants" (ខោចែវថ្នេរប្រាំ) or "achar pants" (ខោអាចារ្យ). They are found all through Southeast Asia: in Thailand, they are called fisherman pants. Among the Shan people, they are known as shan baung-mi (ရှမ်းဘောင်းဘီ); they were paired with a Chinese shirt and were worn by the aristocracy and even the Chao Pha king of the Ahom dynasty until the 19th century.

His white shirt is collarless, with long and sometimes short sleeves.

His white krama is traditionally worn as a sash under one arm and over the opposite shoulder (usually under the right arm and over the left shoulder).

=== Selection ===
The achar vat is generally selected in a consultation process between the chau adhikar and the village community. Achars must always be male and usually an elder. In his role to guide the prayer of the faithful, the achar must be proficient in the requisite Pali formulae and must be something of a ritual specialist. Ideally, he must be a pious older man who keeps the first eight precepts of the novice monk. In addition he must be known for his financial probity. Some larger monasteries, given their varied activities, may have more than one achar, so a chairman (achar thom) is elected from their midst and he can be seconded by an achar rong (vice-achar). For this reason, achars are often ex-monks.

=== Hierarchy ===
Though the achar is inferior to the bhikkhu in the religious hierarchy of the sangha, he is nevertheless respected by the monks who in turn venerate them. For many activities, from spending money to preaching, the monks seek the approval of the achar. As such, an officiating monk will not rise to deliver a sermon until invited to do so by an achar, who recites a series of verses describing how the deity Brahmà Saharpati requested the Buddha to preach the dhamma for the very first time.

== Culture ==
=== Literature ===
As learned intellectuals, the achar have had an important role in the transmission of Khmer literature and so have also contributed to it significantly. Achar Ind (1859–1925) wrote a number of works, including the famous collection of 112 folk tales called Gatilok, Subhasit cpàp’ srì, and Nirieh Nokor Wat (A pilgrimage to Angkor Wat) and he also translated a Thai version of the royal chronicles into Khmer. The French missionary priest Sindulphe-Joseph Tandart studied Khmer with Achar Ind while composing his two-volume dictionary.

=== Music: smot ===
During Khmer funerals, the chanting tradition of smot can be performed by either men or women, monks or laymen but it is most often chanted solo and a capella by the achar.
