= Suttantaprija Ind =

Khmer monk and poet (1859–1924)

Louk Oknha Suttantaprija Ind
- សុត្តន្តប្រីជាឥន្ទ
- Born: Suttantaprija Ind; 22 July 1859; Mukh Kampul, Kandal, Cambodia
- Died: 8 November 1924 (aged 65); Battambang, Cambodia, French Indochina
- Occupations: Author; poet; monk
- Years active: 1914–1924
- Spouse: Louk Yeay Tuot
- Children: Son, San, Ly, Lone, and Yueon

Suttantaprija Ind (Khmer: សុត្តន្តប្រីជាឥន្ទ, UNGEGN: Sŏttântâbreichéa Ĕnt, ALA-LC: Suttantaprījā Ind; 22 July 1859 – 8 November 1924) was a Cambodian monk, who later became a lay achar, writer, and famous poet. His title, Louk Oknha, or "Lord" in English, was bestowed upon him by the King of Cambodia due to his writings, poetry skills, and extensive works in preserving Khmer literature.

== Biography ==
Suttantaprija Ind was born to Bongchong Keo in Rokar Korng Village, Tonle Thom, Muk Kampoul, Kandal Province, on July 22, 1859.

Ind studied Khmer literature when he was 10. When he was 15, he translated 'Prash Bakriyath', and then became a monk at the monastery Wat Pri Po for one year. He then went to study with Lok Archa Peach in Prash Tropang. When he was 18, he studied with Buddhist professor Brak at Wat Una Lom in Phnom Penh. When he was 19, he studied with Lok Archa Sok at Wat Keo, Battambang. At age 20, he became a monk again at Wat Keo for one year, and studied in Bangkok.

After 7 years in Thailand, Ind came back to Cambodia during the time of Lok Prash Yakatha Choun Gnogn and stayed at Wat Kandal in Battambang for 10 years. He then married Lok Yay Tuet from Chomka Somroung village, Battambang, and lived in Chvia Thom village. Lok Prash Yakatha Choun Gnogn gave him the title of Khon Vichit Voha and then Hlung Vichit Voha. He wrote and translated Pali texts into Khmer for 44 different titles. After Lok Prash Yakatha Choun Gnogn left Battambang, Ind went to work in Phnom Penh for 10 years (1914-1924). When he was 55, he was promoted to be Lok Oknha Suttantaprija. He helped create the Khmer Buddhist Dictionary at the Pali school. Between the age of 55 and 65, he came back and spent the rest of his life with his family in Battambang.

He died on November 8, 1924.

== Works ==
Ind's works include the Gatilok series, Nirasnatavat, Hombang Back, Bakthom Sompoth, Loknitbakor, Sopearseth Chbap Srey, and many poems. Some of his works, such as the Katilok series and Chombang Takoa, were written to reflect the Khmer culture and life during Lok Prash Yakatha Choun Gnogn's time. At the turn of the century, Lok Oknha Suttantaprija Ind was prominent in Battambang Province. He was called Lok Archa Ind, his work was admired, and he was respected for his contributions to society. Before there were books published in Battambang, his books were borrowed and hand-copied. These hand-copied books were circulated for reading and studying; some people memorized his poems by heart. He also worked with a French Catholic missionary, Father Sindulphe Tandart, and created a French–Khmer dictionary known as "Tandart Dictionary".

Ind's poem Journey to Angkor Wat describes his travel to attend the visit of King Sisowath to the Angkor Wat temple complex in 1909. It was discovered after his death and published posthumously in 1934. The passages on his journey by river and the first sight of the stone lions are some of the most famous passages in Cambodian literature.

Following Ind's death, according to Lone Ind, the French government took many of his works, some of which were not yet published. This opens the speculation that some of his works may still be in circulation or custody with the French.

== Family ==
Suttantaprija Ind had 5 children:

- Ind Son (son- deceased),
- Ind San (daughter - deceased),
- Ind Ly (daughter - deceased),
- Ind Lone (daughter - deceased), and
- Ind Yueon (daughter - deceased).

As of 2015, there is only one grandchild - Ind Yueon's daughter, who lives in Chvia Village, Sangke District, Battambang. He has many great-grandchildren, who live in Cambodia, France, America, and other countries.
