= Suvannamaccha =

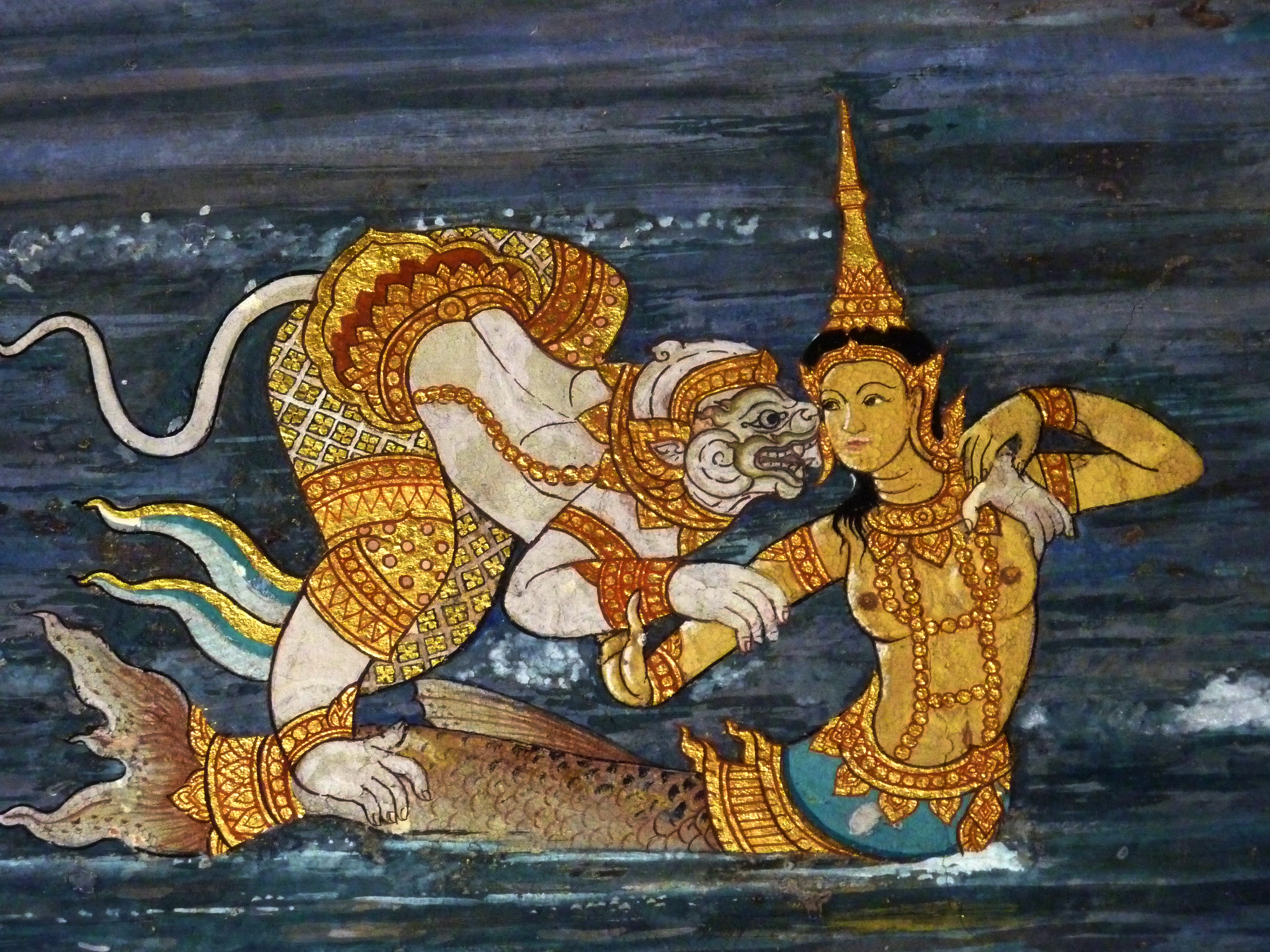
- A mural painting of Suvannamaccha and Hanuman at Wat Phra Kaew, Bangkok.

In-universe information
- Family: Hanuman (Spouse), Macchanu (son), Ravana (father)

Suvannamaccha (Thai: สุพรรณมัจฉา; RTGS: Suphannamatcha or Suphan Matcha; Khmer: សុវណ្ណមច្ឆា, ALA-LC: Suvaṇṇmacchā; Pali: सुवण्णमच्छा, suvaṇṇamacchā; literally "golden fish") is a daughter of Ravana (Thotsakan) appearing in the Thailand and other Southeast Asian versions of Ramayana. She is a mermaid princess who tries to spoil Hanuman's plans to build a bridge to Lanka but falls in love with him instead.

The figure of Suvannamaccha is popular in Thai folklore and is represented on small cloth streamers or framed pictures that are hung as luck-bringing charms in shops and houses throughout Thailand.

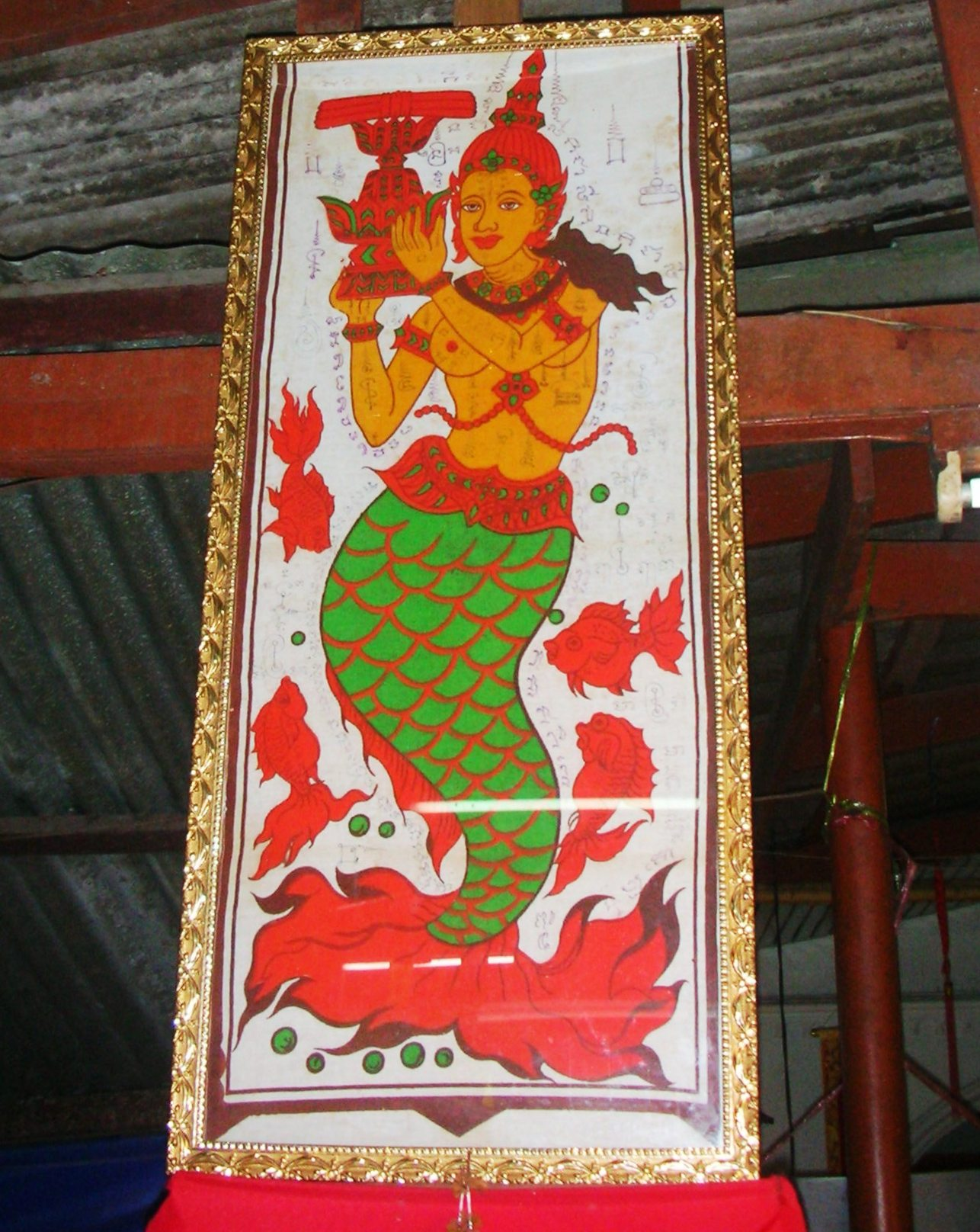
Suvannamaccha luck bringing charm in a riverside shop in Nonthaburi, Thailand

== Story ==
Hanuman, building a causeway, discovered that he was hampered by mermaids underwater. When Sita is kidnapped, her husband Rama enlists Hanuman's aid in rescuing her.

Hanuman learns that Sita is being held captive on the island of Lanka. He informs Rama, her husband, who orders him to build a causeway to Sri Lanka from India so Rama's army can attack. Hanuman collects his band of Vanaras and they begin throwing huge boulders into the sea to make a foundation for the causeway.

After a few days they notice something is wrong and call Hanuman to report. They tell him that each day they throw rocks into the sea and the next day they are gone.

Hanuman asks for volunteers to join him while he instructs the others to continue throwing rocks into the sea. When several volunteers have stepped forward Hanuman leads them into the waves. They find a large number of mermaids underwater. As they watch, a new rock is tossed in. The mermaids living underwater take the rocks and carry them away. Hanuman looks for their leader. He spots a lovely mermaid supervising the others. He swims towards her but she skillfully evades him. Time and again he begins an attack but it comes to nothing.

Hanuman finds he is falling in love with the creature. He changes his tactics and begins to silently woo her. She responds to him and soon they are together at the bottom of the sea.

Later, Hanuman asks the mermaid why she is stealing the rocks. She tells him that she is Suvannamaccha, a daughter of Ravana (the demon who had abducted Sita). When Ravana saw Hanuman's Vanaras building a causeway he instructed Suvannamaccha to stop it. Hanuman tells the mermaid why he is building the causeway. He tells her of the abduction of Sita, the battle between Rama and her father Ravana and why they started to build a bridge to reach Lanka.

Suvannamaccha turned to Hanuman and her eyes were filled with love. No more, she said, would she prevent Hanuman from completing his mission. Her mermaids underwater would, in fact, return all the stolen rocks to the causeway.

They parted as lovers part but it was not to be the end for them. Hanuman had left a seed with Suvannamaccha and soon she would give birth to their son, Macchanu.
