= Macchanu =

Son of Hanuman

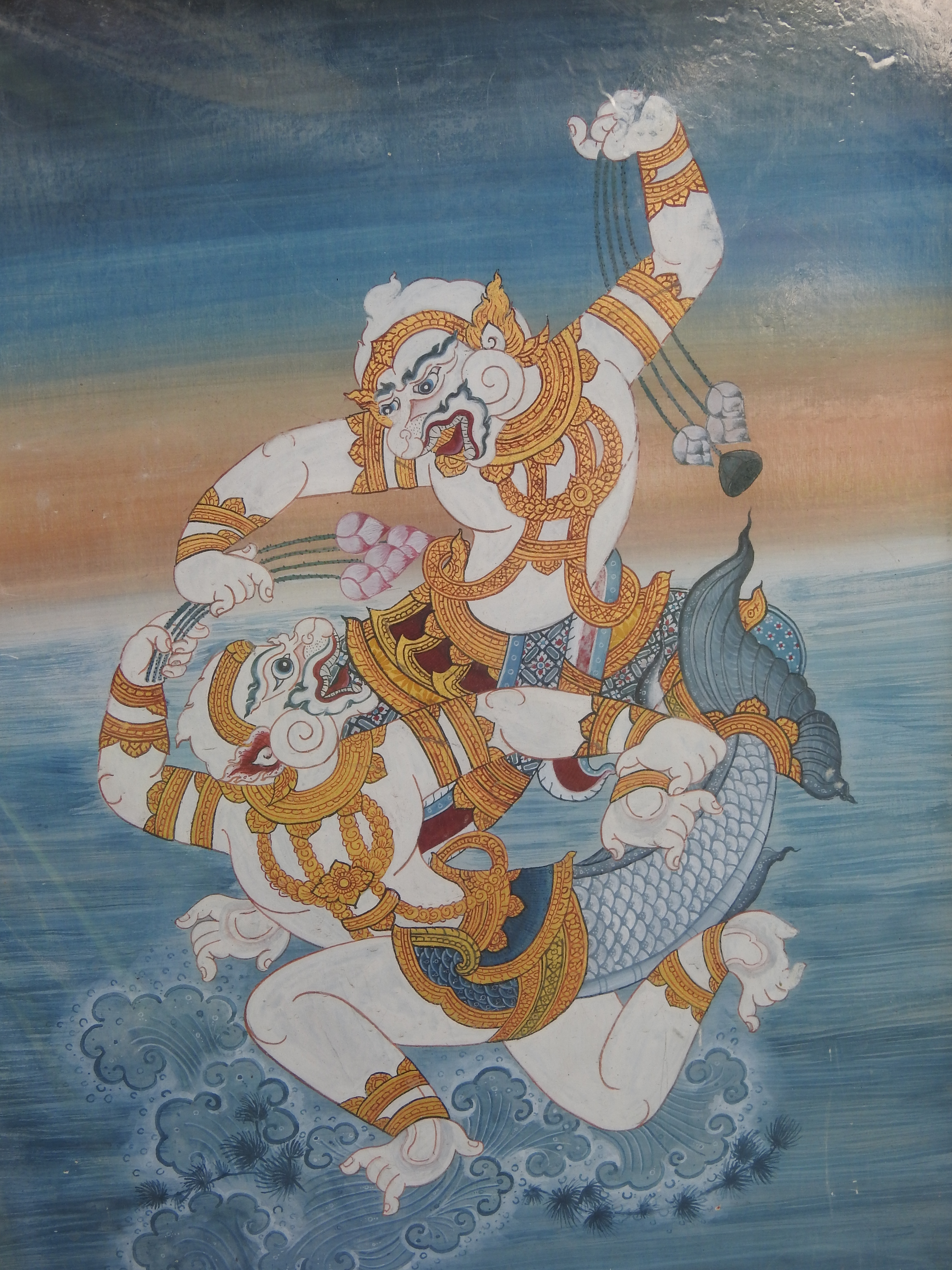
Macchanu and Hanuman

Macchanu (Thai: มัจฉานุ; RTGS: Matchanu; Khmer: មច្ឆានុប; RTGS: Macchanub) is the son of Hanuman that appears in the Thai version of the story and other versions of the Ramayana.

As per these versions of Ramayana, during one of the battles with Ravana's army, Hanuman encounters one powerful opponent, who looked like vanara from waist-up but had tail of a fish. After a fierce battle, as Hanuman was about to hit the creature with his weapons, a golden star shining in the sky above, reveals by way of Akashvani that the enemy, whom he is going to harm is his own son born by his union with Suvannamaccha, the mermaid daughter of Ravana. Hanuman, immediately holds his weapons in mid-air and father-son duo recognize each other.

Another version of story tells, while following Maiyarap in order to find Rama and Laxmana, who have been abducted by Maiyarap and taken to his kingdom in netherworld, Hanuman reaches a pond, where he encounters Macchanu. The fight between them is indecisive, therefore, Hanuman is surprised and asks his opponent, who is he. Macchanu introduces himself as son of Hanuman and Suvannamaccha and so they finally identify and embrace each other. He tells Hanuman that Maiyarap is his foster father, who had picked him up lying on sea shore, where his mother had left him. Although, he does not want to betray Maiyarap but tells Hanuman through a riddle the entrance to the netherworld lies inside the lotus in the pond he was guarding.

== See also ==
- Makardhwaja - the son of Hanuman, as per Indian version of Ramayana, where Hanuman is a celibate.
