= Traditional Thai clothing =

National clothing of Thailand

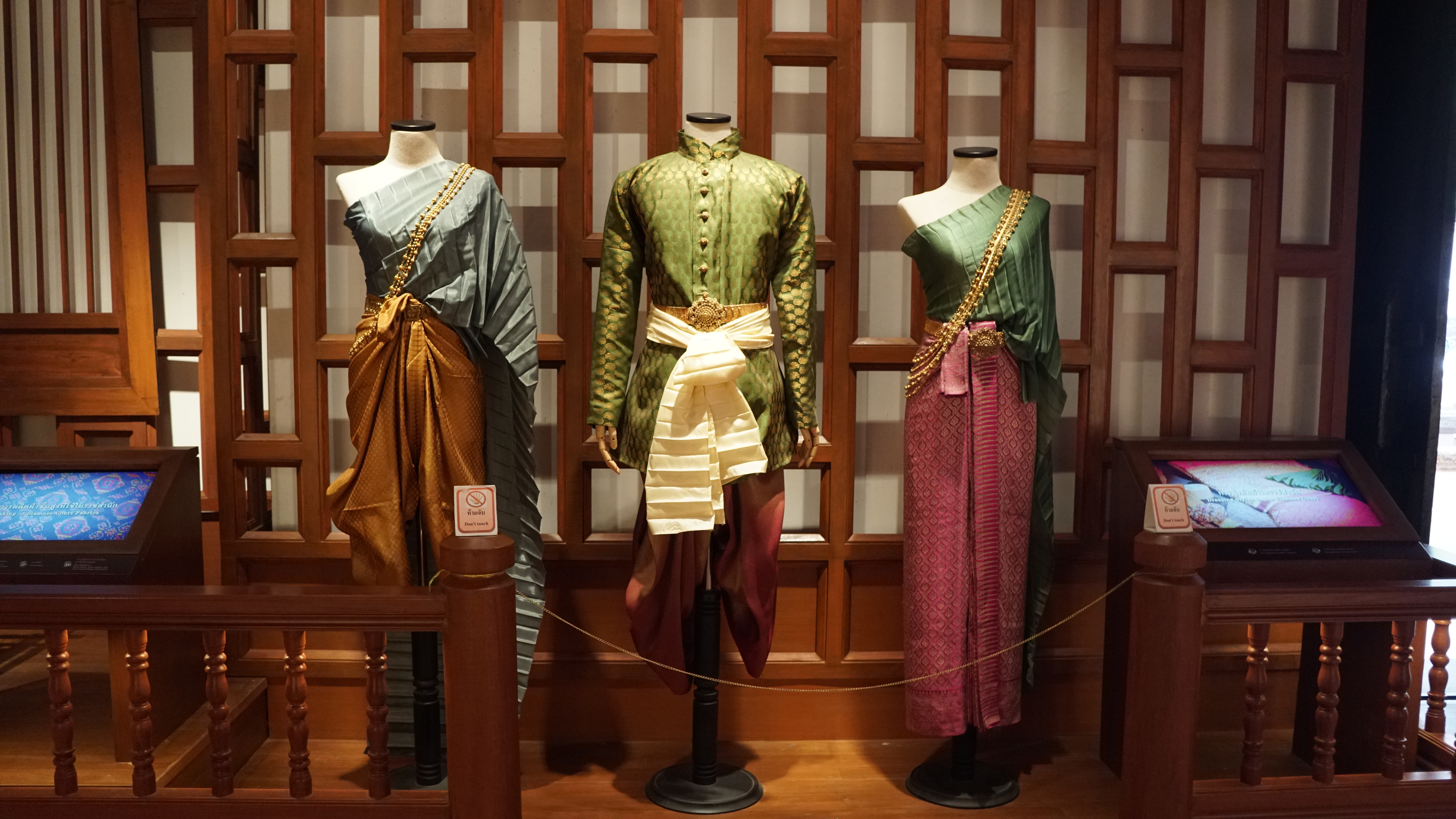
Thai traditional costumes in Bangkok National Museum

Traditional Thai clothing (Thai: ชุดไทย, RTGS: Chut Thai, Thai English: Chud Thai lit. 'Thai outfit') refers to the traditional styles of dress worn by the Thai people. It can be worn by men, women, and children. Traditional clothing for Thai women usually consists of a panung (or chong kraben), and a sabai. The Northern and the Northeastern women may wear a sin instead of a panung and a chong kraben with either a blouse or a suea pat. Traditional clothing for men includes a chong kraben, pants, or a raj pattern shirt, with optional knee-length white socks and a sabai. Traditional clothing for The Northern Thai men is composed of a sado, a white Manchu-styled jacket, and sometimes a khian hua. In formal occasions, people may choose to wear a so-called formal Thai national costume.

== History ==
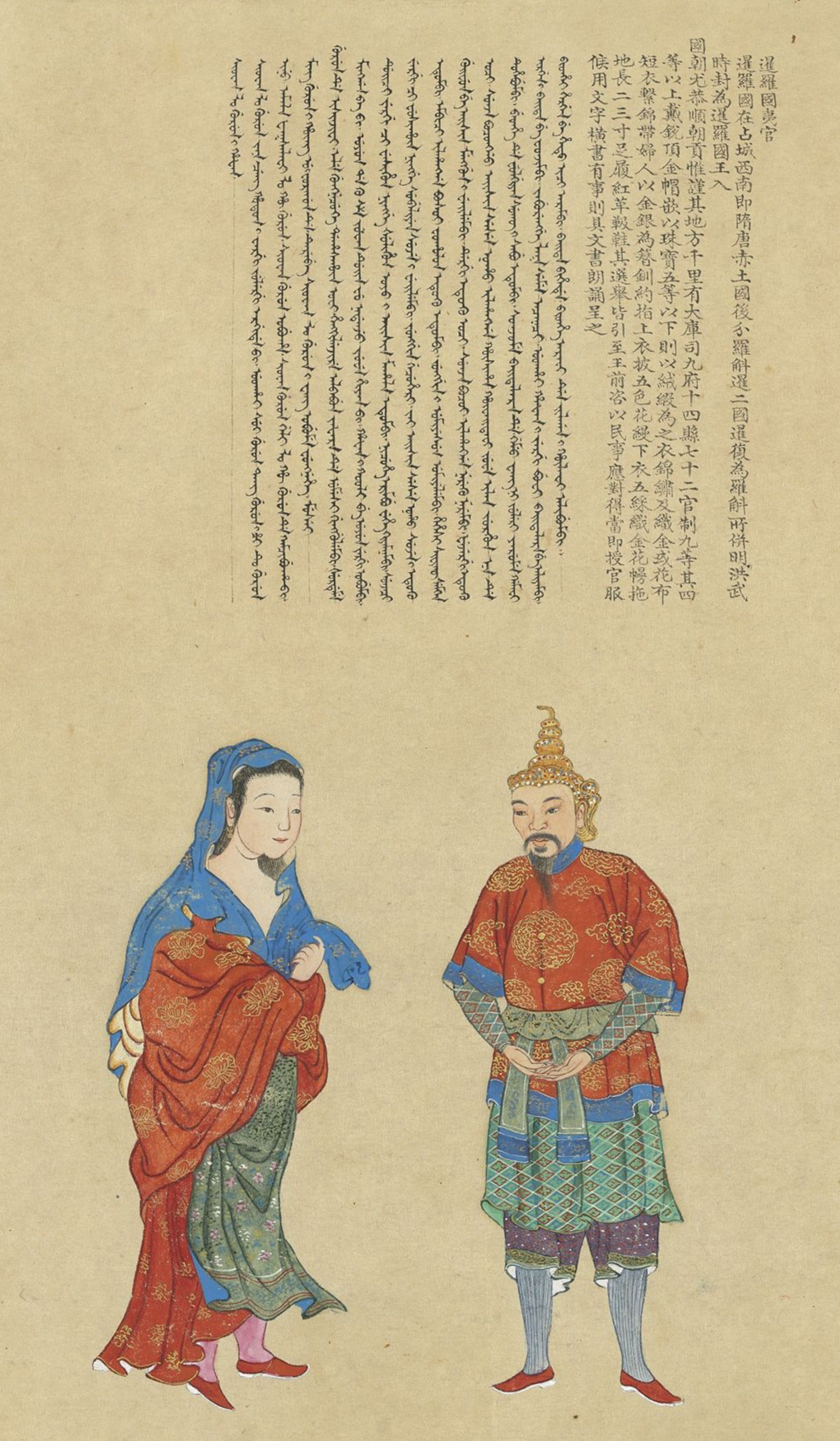
Portrait of Siamese State Official, one of portrait paintings collection in The Portraits of Periodical Offering of Imperial Qing by Xie Sui, 18th century painting in the National Palace Museum in Taipei.

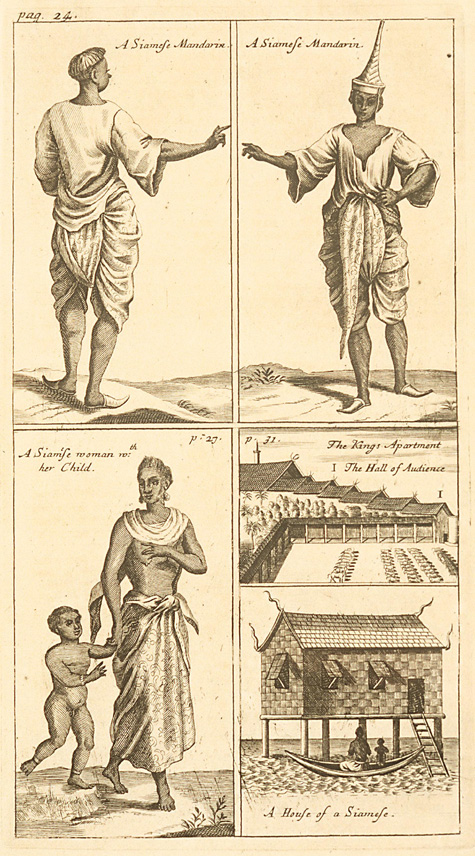
Du Royaume de Siam by Simon de la Loubère shows a Siamese official wearing lomphok and chong kraben and a traditional Thai house

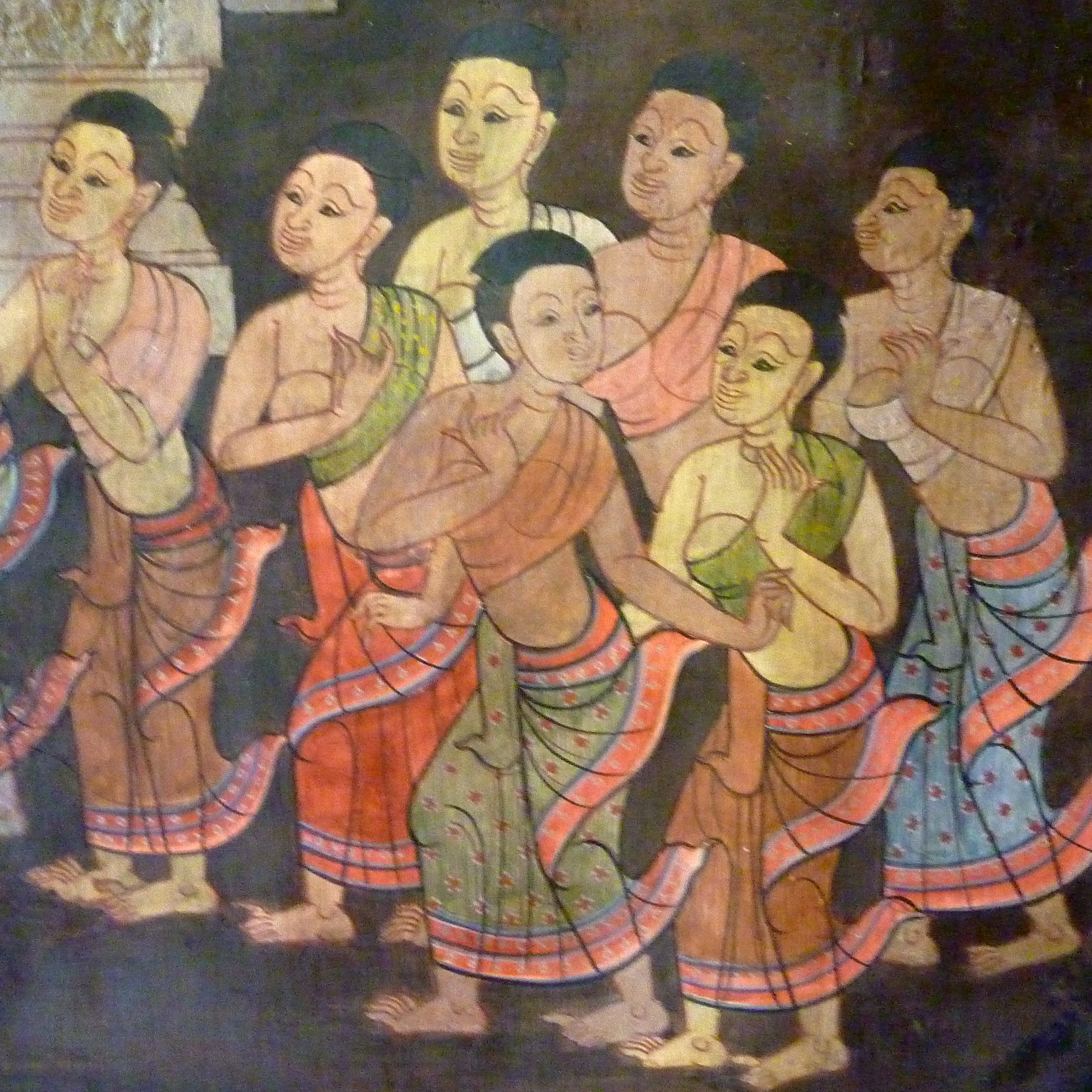
Painting of Siamese women wearing panung and sabai or pha biang in Wat Pho, Bangkok

Historically, both Thai males and females dressed themselves with a loincloth wrap called chong kraben. Men wore their chong kraben to cover the waist to halfway down the thigh, whilst women wore their chong kraben down the waist to well below the knee. Members of the nobility wore silk robes called khrui and a tall, pointed hat called lomphok in attendance of royal affairs. Bare chests and bare feet were accepted as part of the Thai formal dress code, and are observed in murals, illustrated manuscripts, and early photographs up to the middle–1800s. Prior to the 20th century, the primary markers that distinguished class in Thai clothing were the use of cotton and silk cloths with printed or woven motifs, but both commoners and royals alike wore wrapped, not stitched clothing.

Prior to the 1700s, Thai men and women both kept their hair long. However, following the Burmese–Siamese wars between 1759–1760, 1765–1767 and repeated Burmese invasions into Ayutthaya Kingdom, Central Thai women began cutting their hair in a crew cut short style, which remained the national hairstyle until the 1900s.

From the 1860s onward, Thai royals "selectively adopted Victorian corporeal and sartorial etiquette to fashion modern personas that were publicized domestically and internationally by means of mechanically reproduced images". Stitched clothing, including court attire and ceremonial uniforms, were invented during the reign of King Chulalongkorn. Western forms of dress became popular among urbanites in Bangkok during this period. During the early–1900s, King Chulalongkorn encouraged Thai women to wear long hair instead of traditional short hair which later became a trend during the reign of King Vajiravudh along with wearing sin (Thai: ผ้าซิ่น), a tubular skirt, instead of the chong kraben (Thai: โจงกระเบน), a cloth wrap.

On 15 January 1941, Plaek Phibunsongkhram issued a Thai cultural mandates to modernize and Westernize Thai dress, by deeming the long-practiced customs of wearing underpants, wearing no shirt, or wearing a wraparound cloth, as forms of inappropriate public attire.

== Traditional costumes ==
=== Chong kraben ===
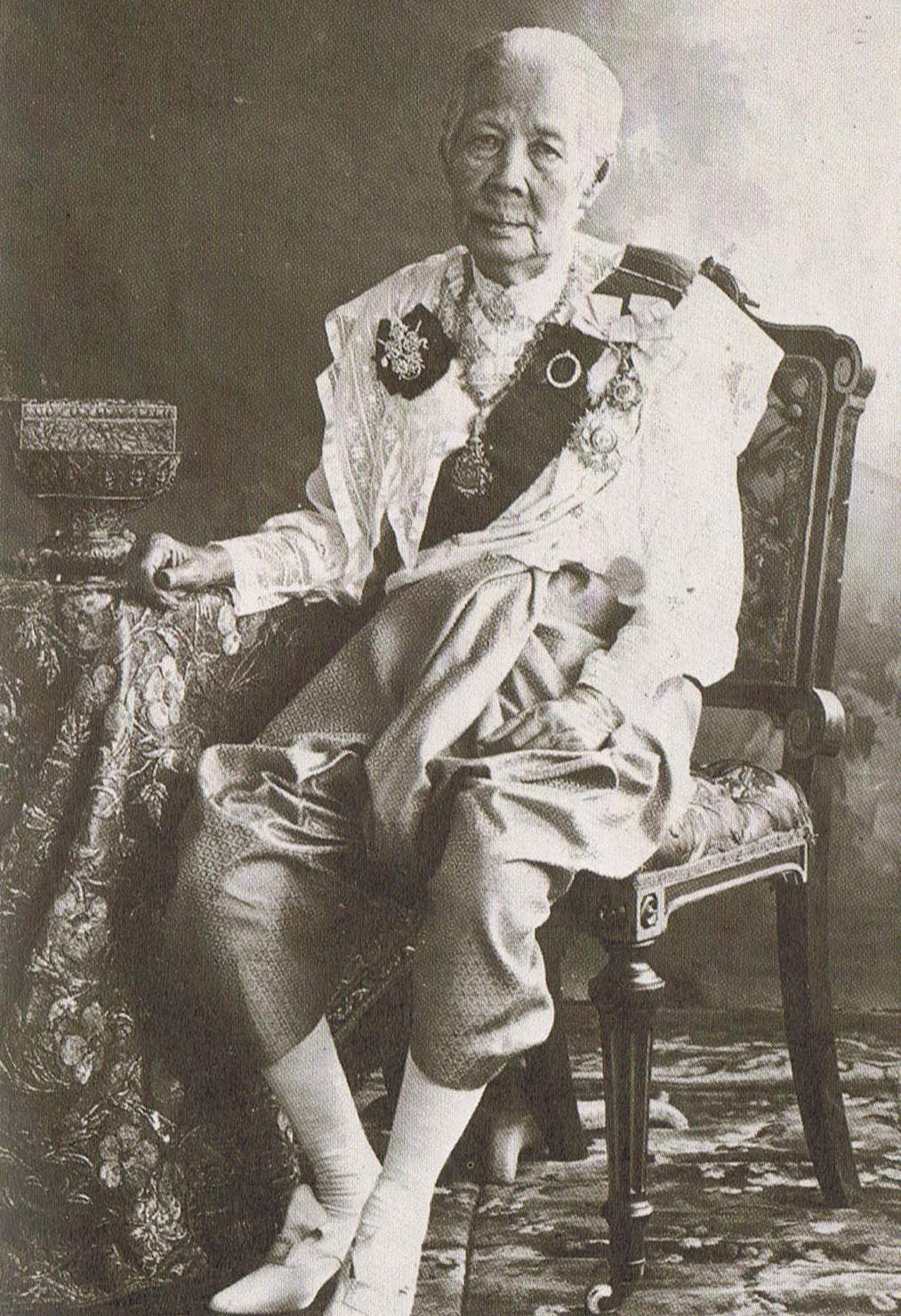
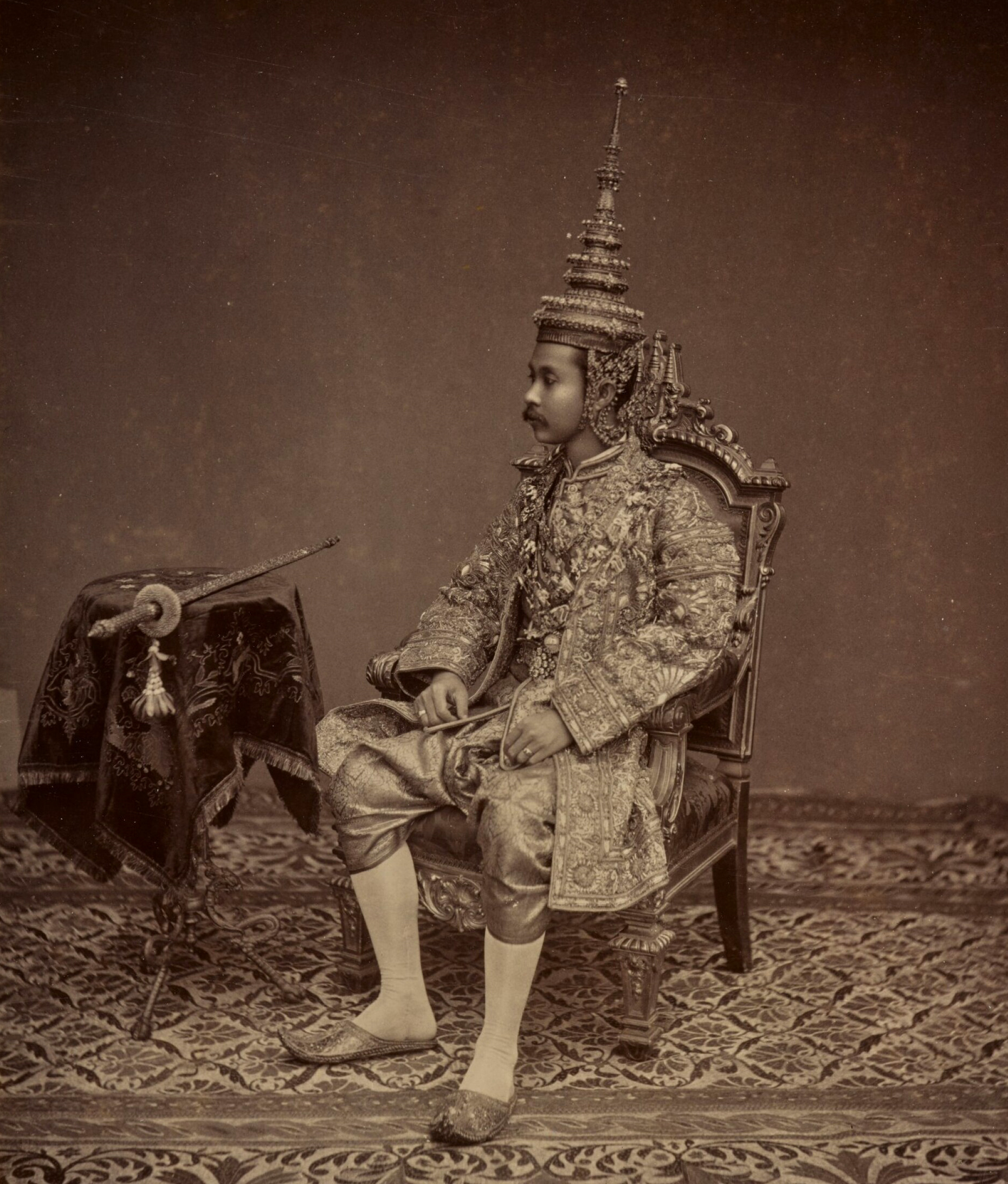
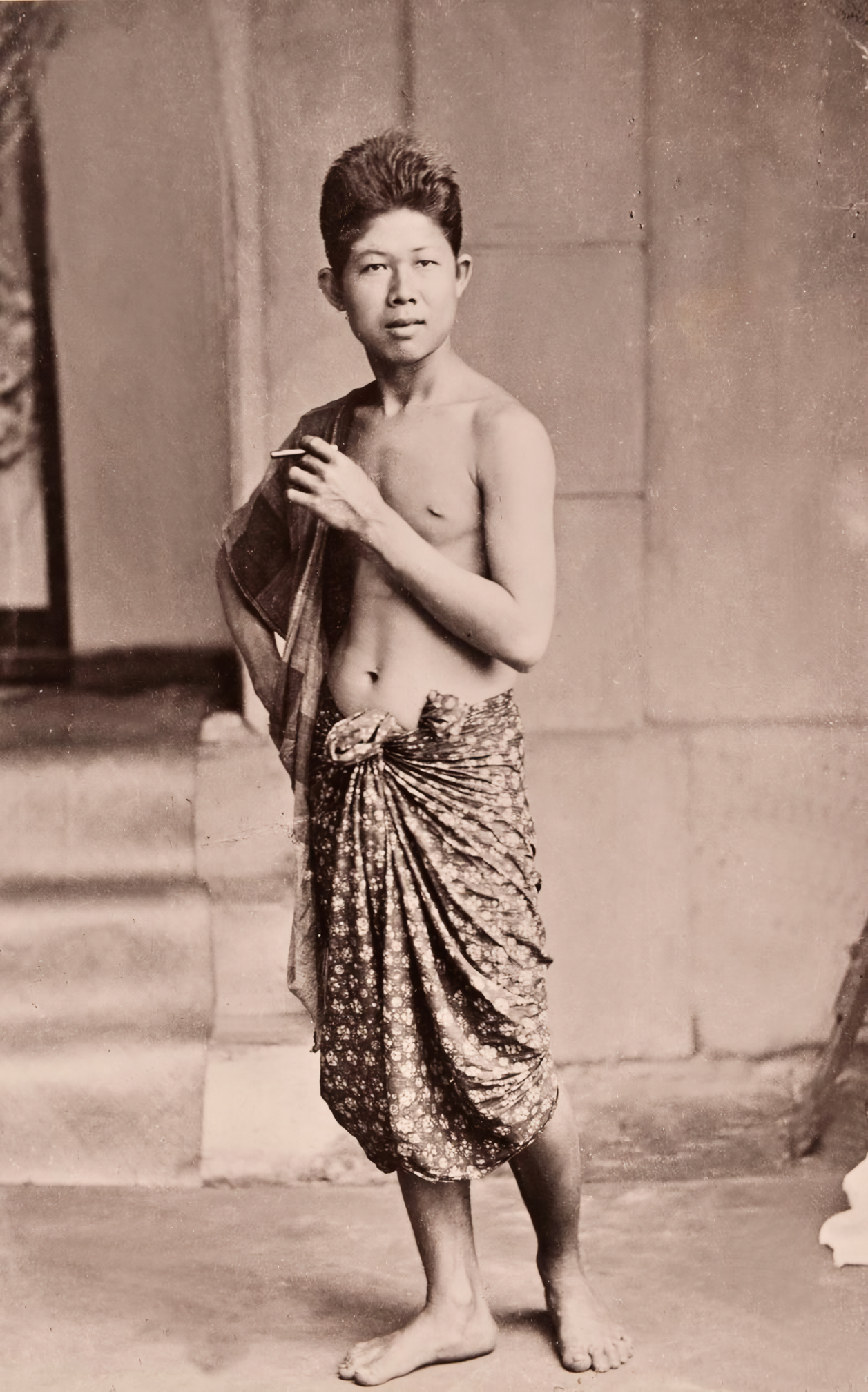
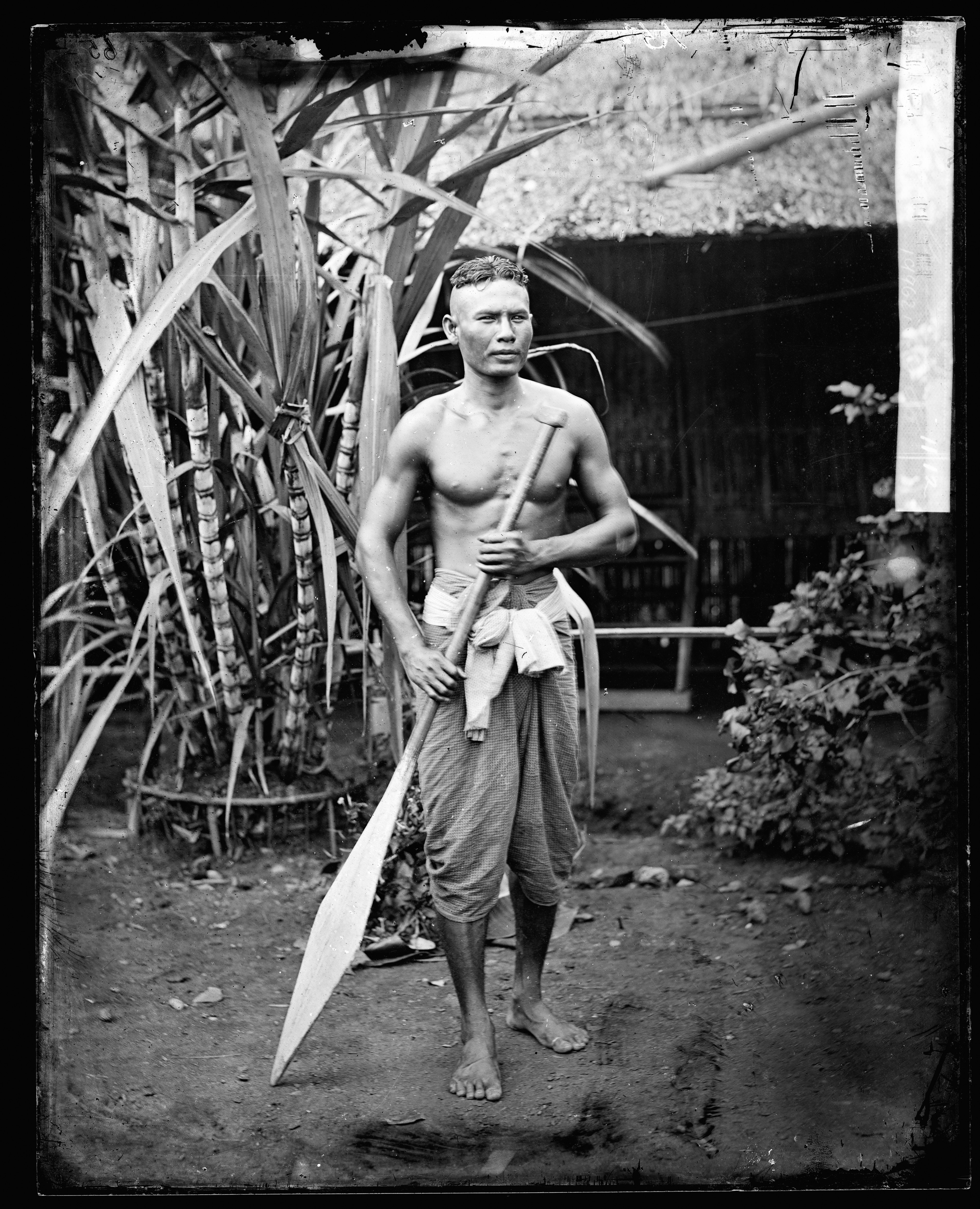
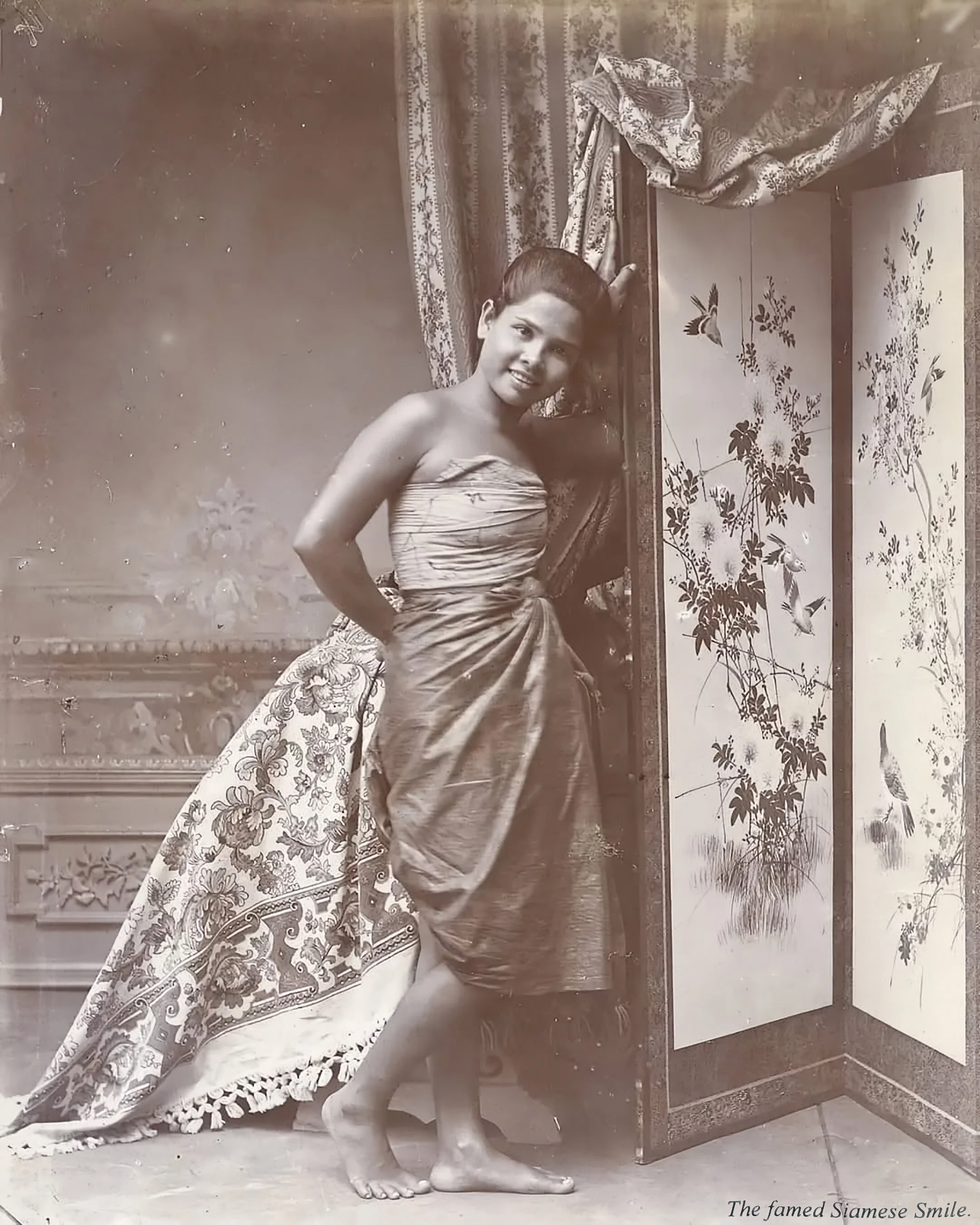
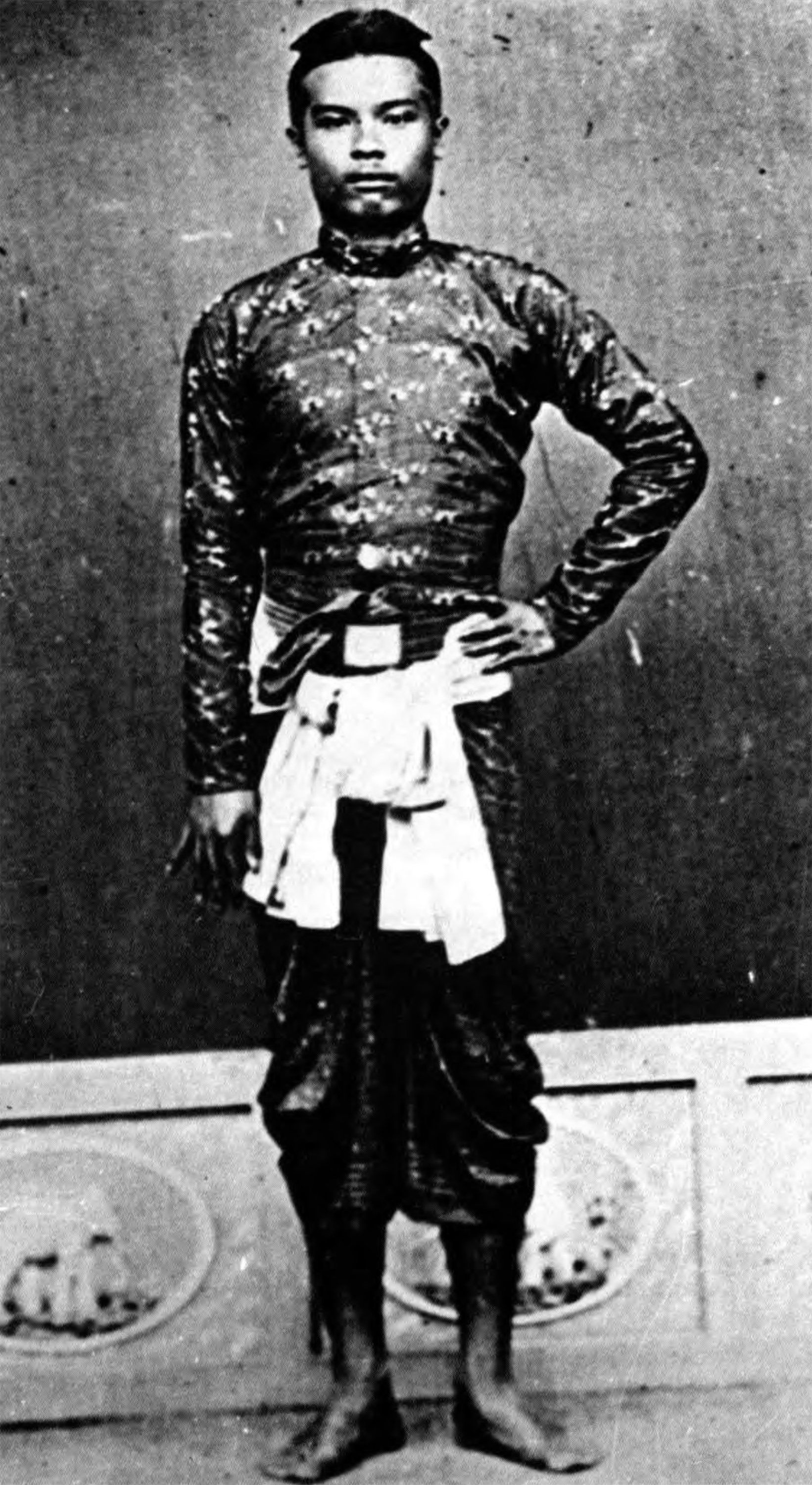
Siamese people dressed in traditional chong kraben garments during different social and ceremonial occasions in the 1800s-1900s

Chong kraben (Thai: โจงกระเบน, Thai pronunciation: [tɕoːŋ.kra.beːn]) is a traditional lower-body garment that originated in Cambodia and was later adopted in Thailand where it is commonly worn. In Khmer, "chong" means the area of cloth that't twisted into a bunch, and "kben" is the bunch's role in concealing "private parts".

In Thailand, the chong kraben became prominent during the Ayutthaya period (14th–18th centuries), where it was worn across different social classes, from commoners to the royal court, with variations in fabric and decoration reflecting status. It remained a standard form of attire into the early Rattanakosin period, particularly in formal and courtly contexts. However, during the reign of King Chulalongkorn in the late 19th and early 20th centuries, dress reforms influenced by Western styles led to the gradual decline of the chong kraben in everyday use. Today, it is preserved as an important element of Thai cultural identity and is commonly worn in traditional ceremonies, classical dance, and formal occasions.

=== Pha nung and Pha sin ===
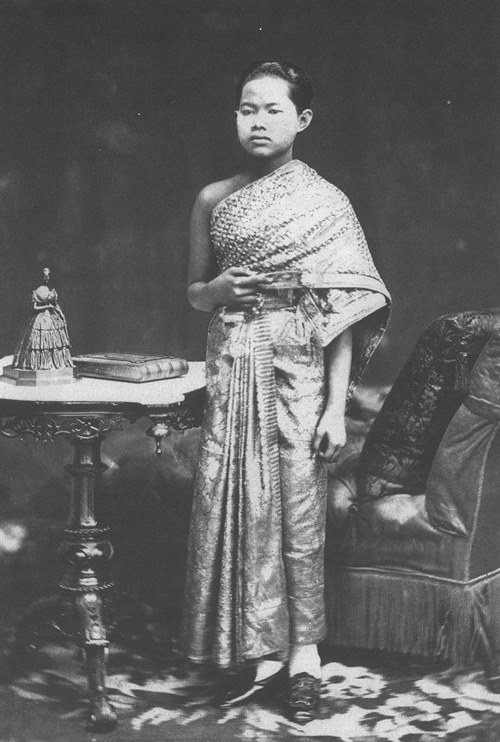
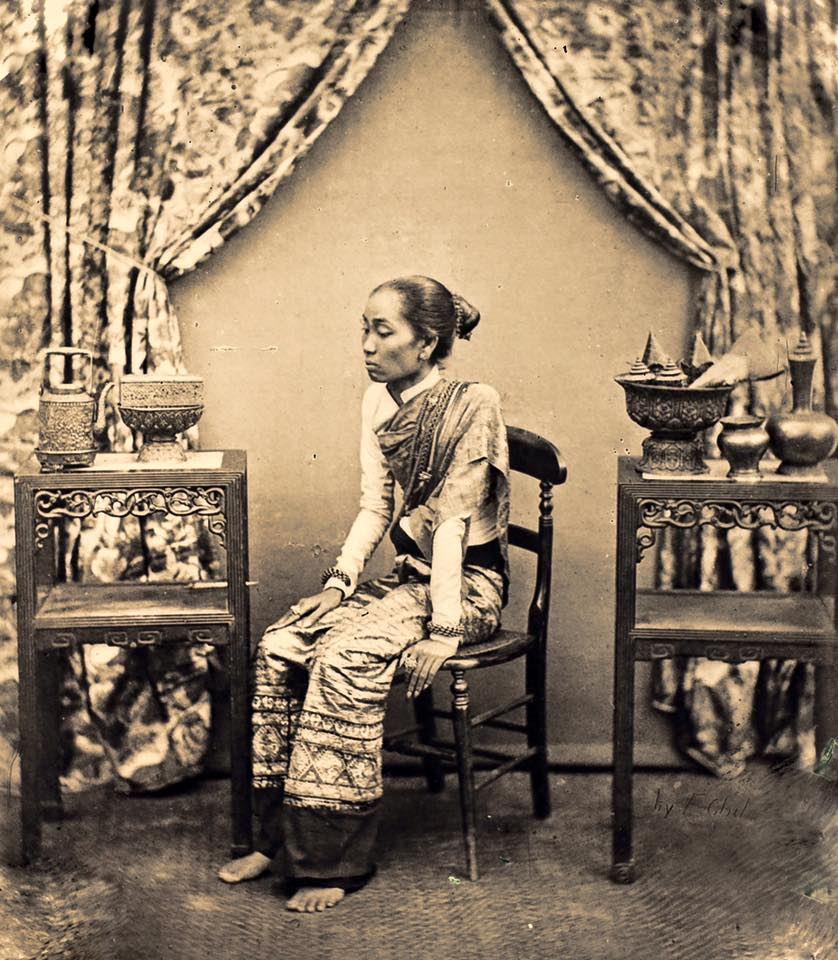
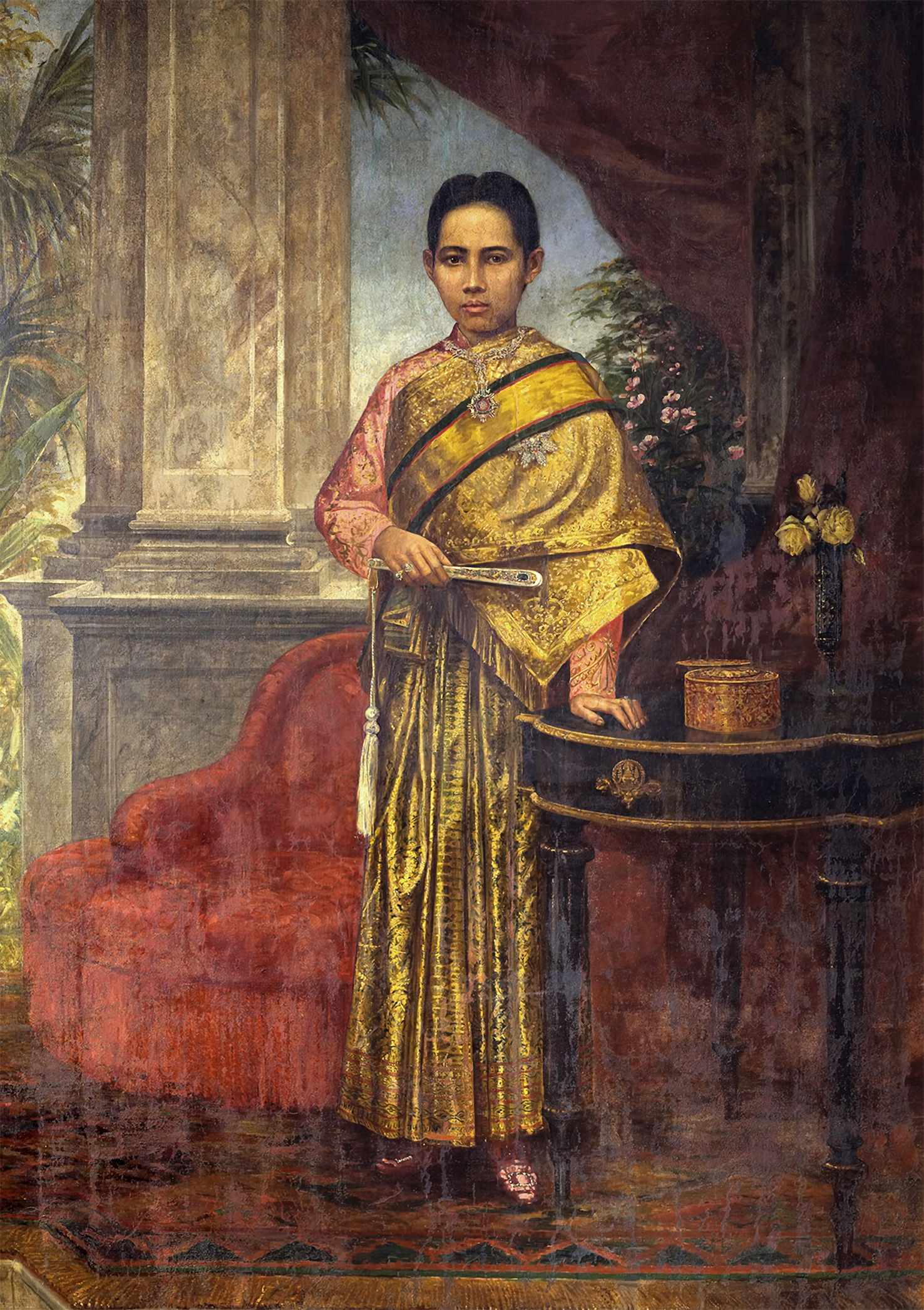
Clockwise: 1. Queen Sunanda Kumariratana, one of the four consorts of King Chulalongkorn wearing panung and sabai. 2. Princess Thip Keson wearing pha sin and pha biang, before 1884. 3. Queen Consort Savang Vadhana painting, c1890

Panung or Pha nung (Thai: ผ้านุ่ง, Thai pronunciation: [pʰâː nûŋ]) is a traditional Thai lower-body garment made from a long rectangular piece of cloth wrapped around the waist and legs, resembling a skirt. It is traditionally worn by both men and women across Thailand. The term pha nung can be used broadly to describe various types of lower garments in Thai culture, including region-specific styles.

One notable variant is Pha sin (Thai: ผ้าซิ่น, Thai pronunciation: [pʰâː sîn]), a tubular skirt traditionally worn by women, especially in the Northern, Northeastern Thailand and Laos. The pha sin is typically handwoven and decorated with intricate regional patterns. It is commonly divided into three sections: the hua sin (waistband), tua sin (main body), and tin sin (hem), each reflecting local artistry and identity.

Another widely used version is Pha thung (Thai: ผ้าถุง, Thai pronunciation: [pʰâː tʰūŋ]), a cylindrical skirt sewn at the ends for convenience. The pha thung is popular in daily life throughout Thailand due to its comfort, ease of wear, and versatility, often used at home, in markets, and even for bathing.

These garments reflect Thailand's rich textile heritage, with variations in style, fabric, and pattern often indicating the wearer's region, social status, or occasion.

=== Sabai or Pha biang ===
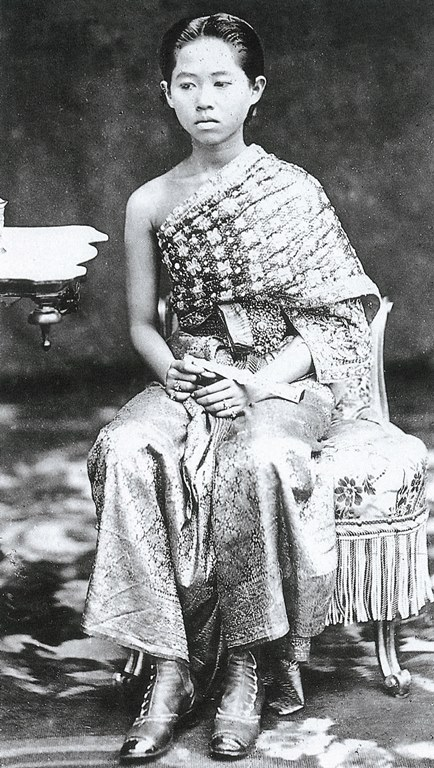
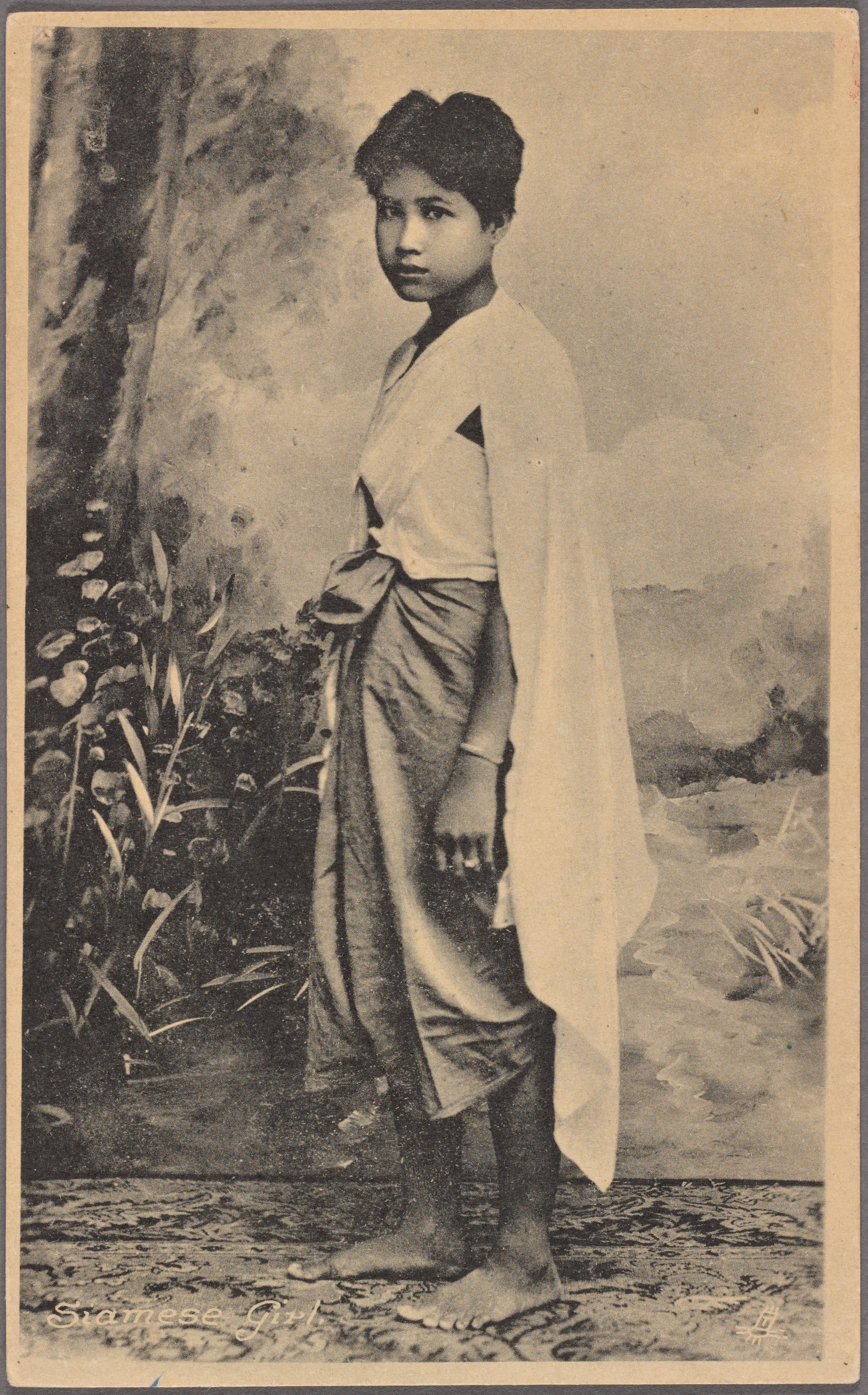
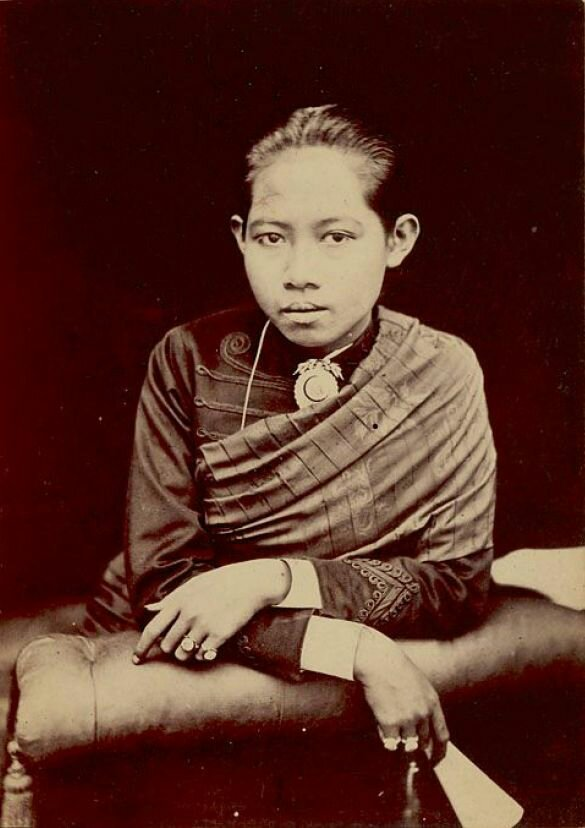
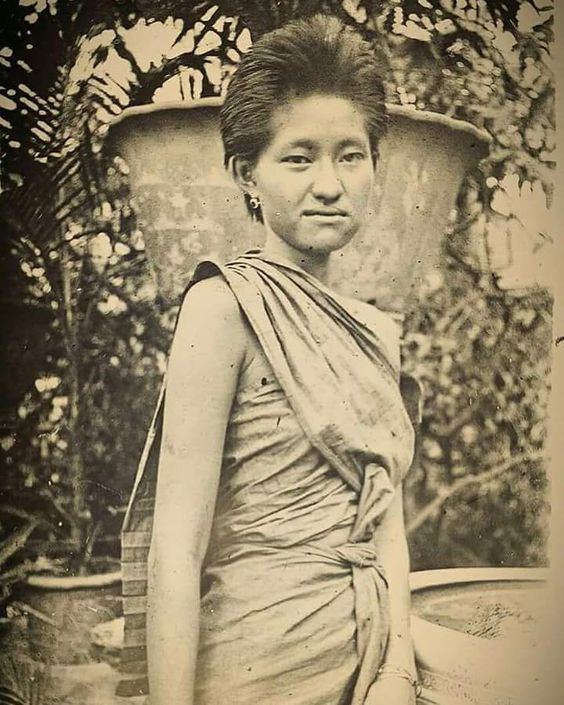
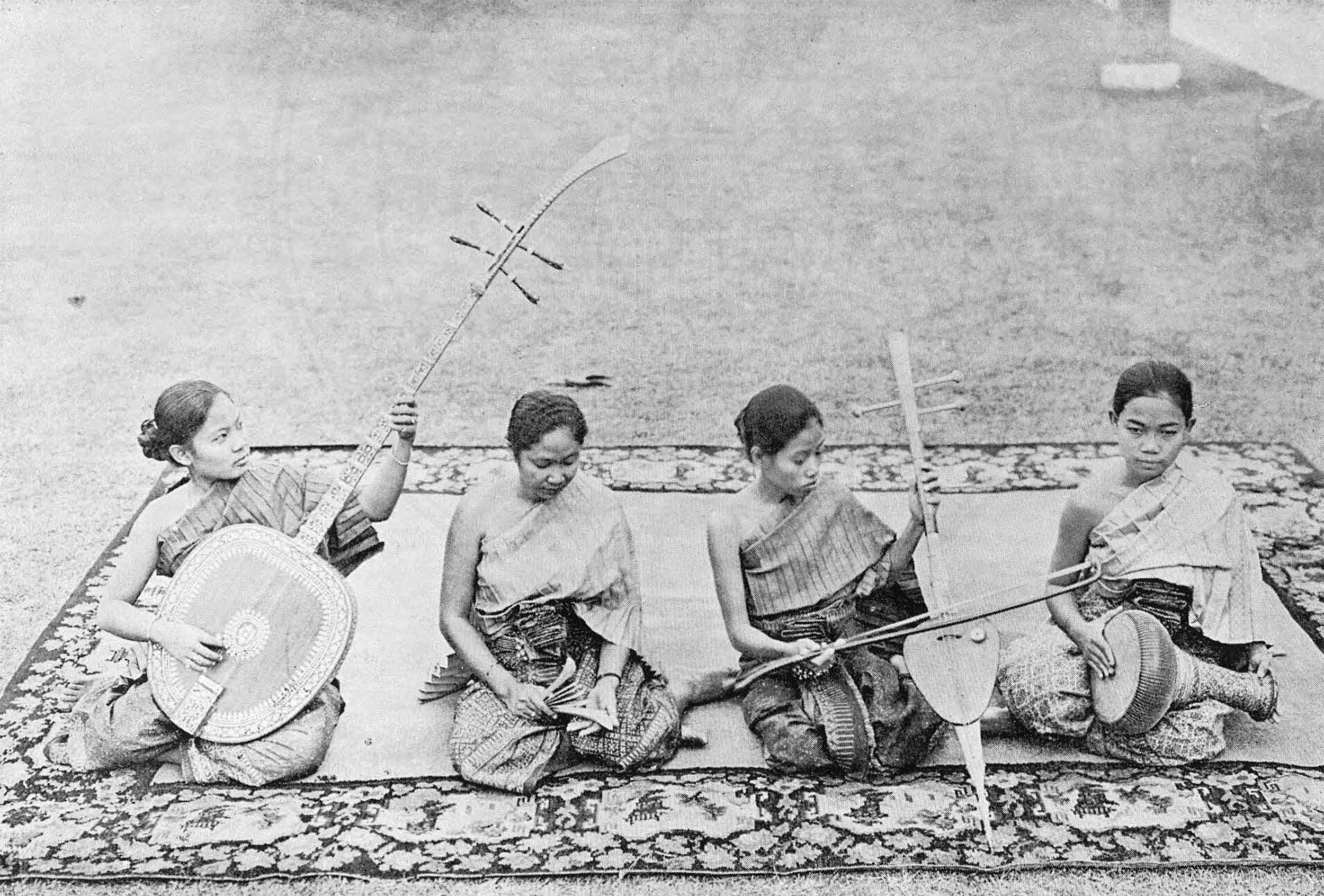
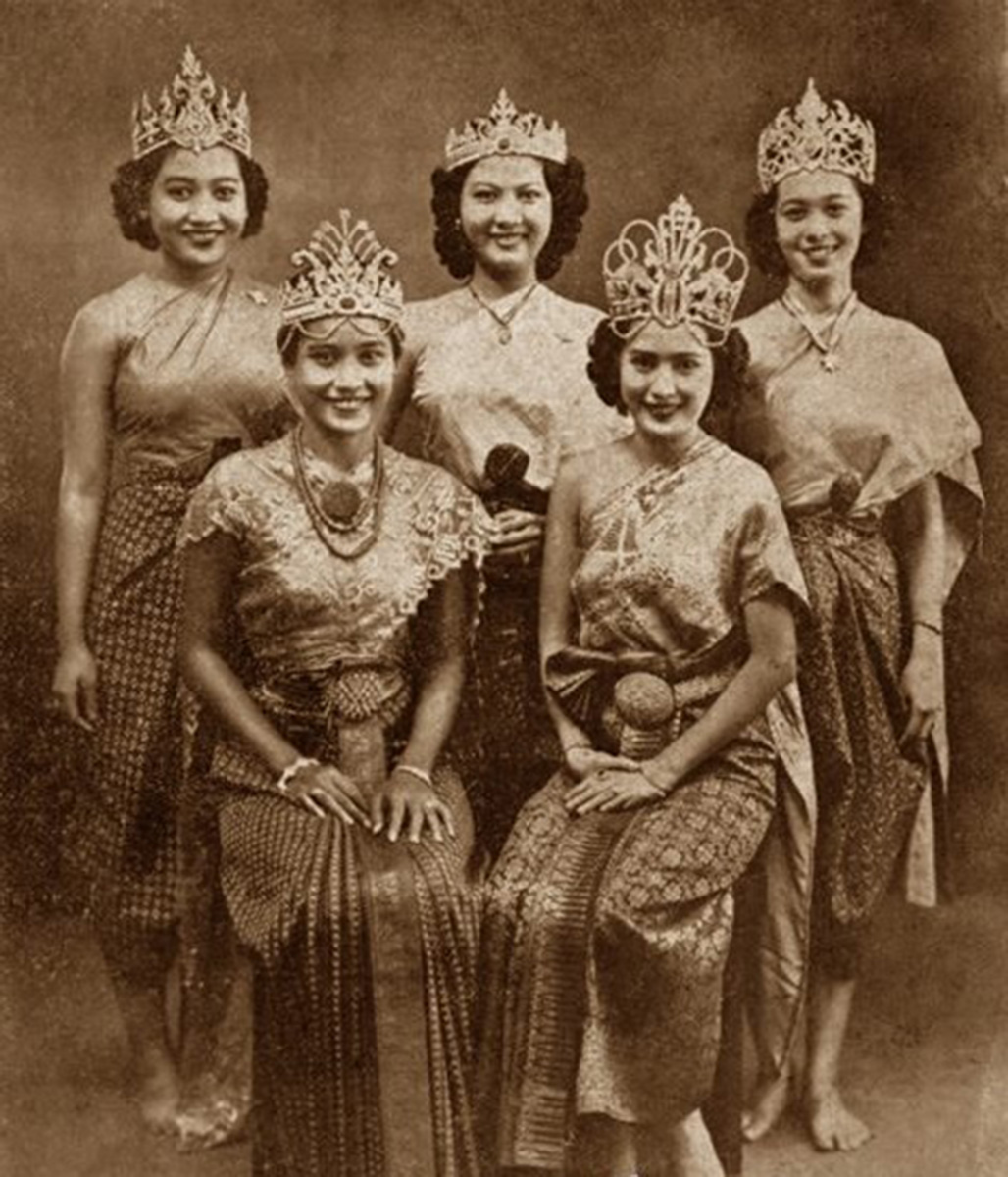
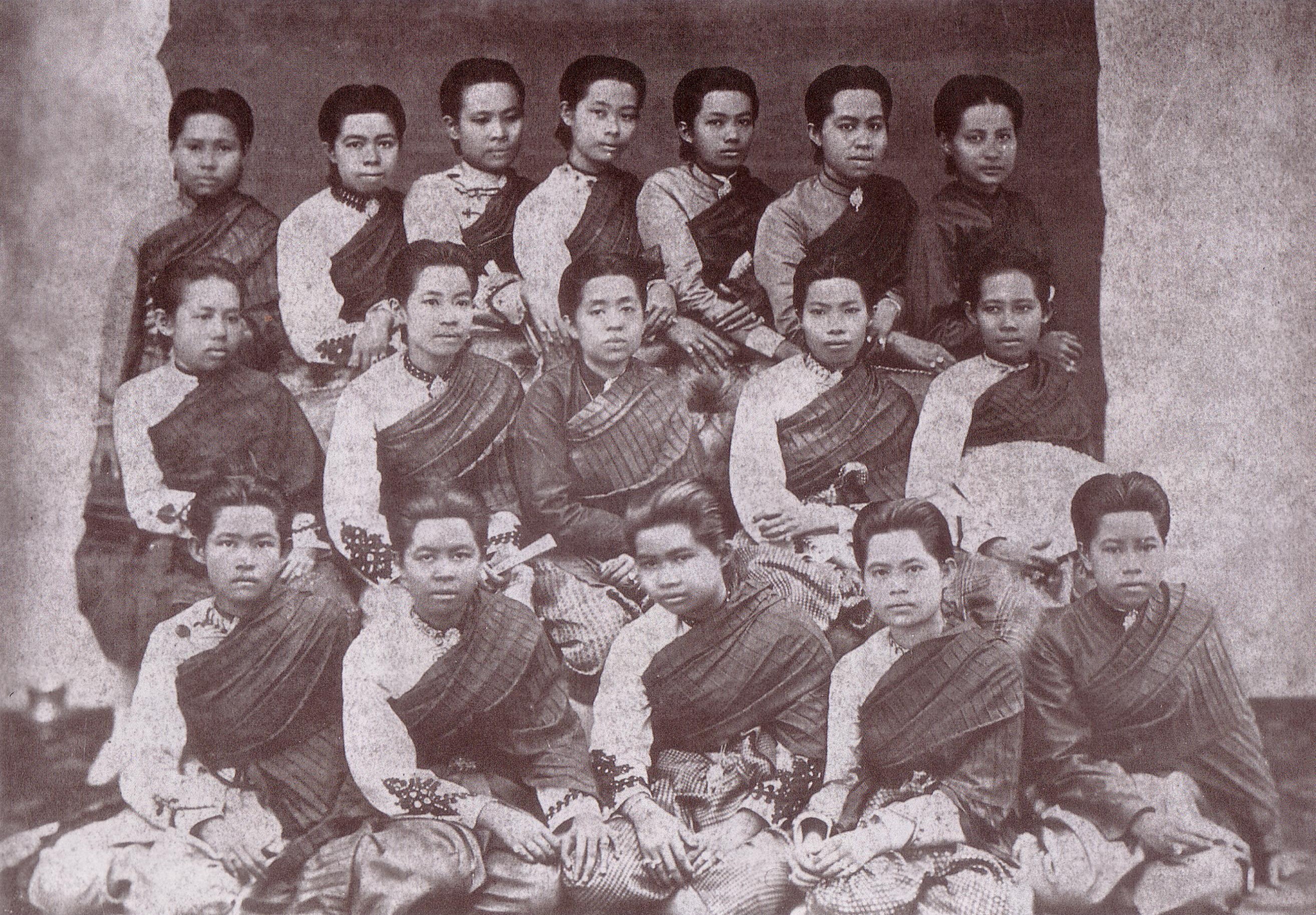
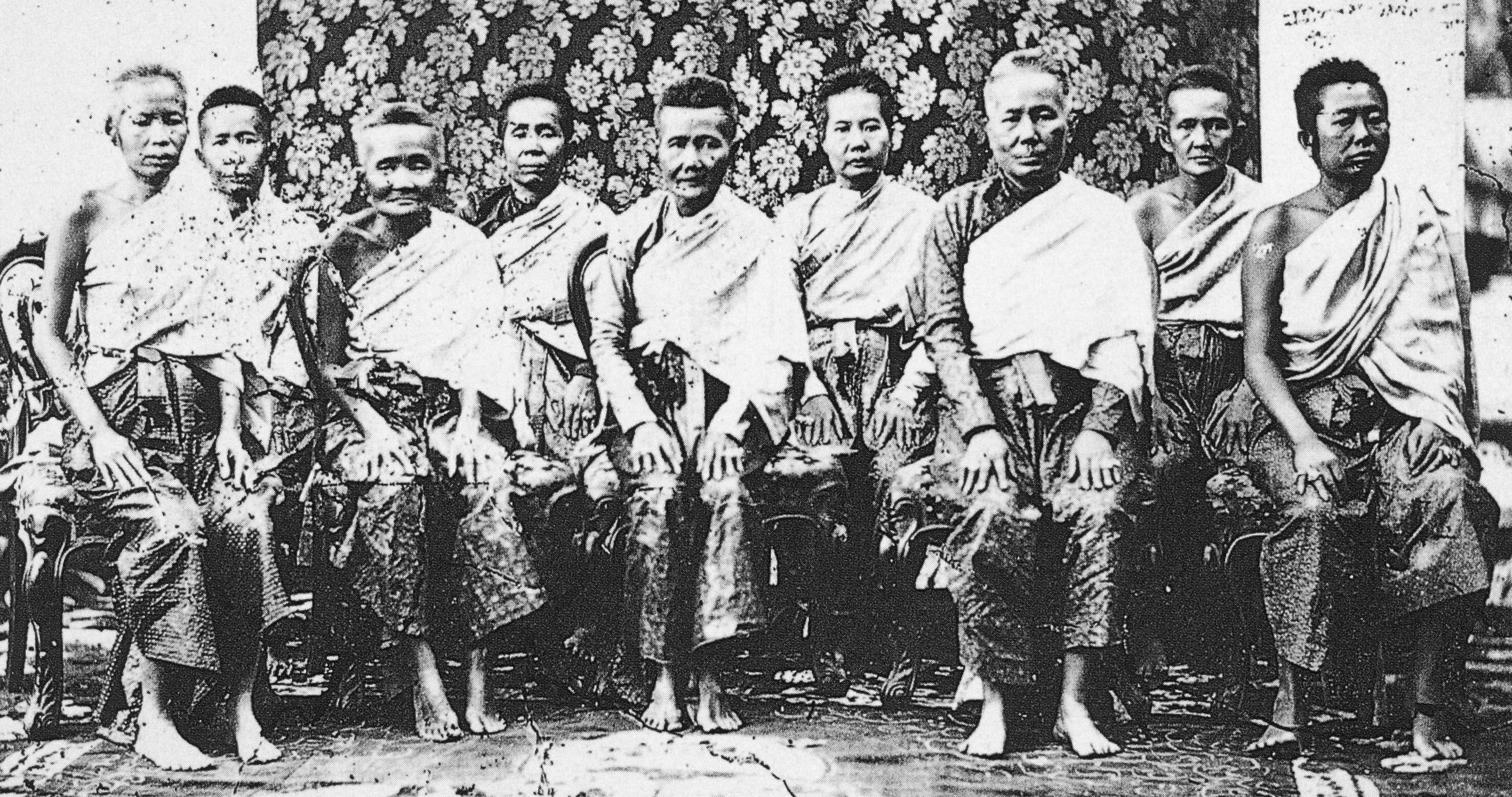
Siamese women dressed in traditional sabai garments during different social and ceremonial occasions in the 1800s-1900s

Sabai (Thai: สไบ; Thai pronunciation: [sa.baj]), also known as Pha biang (Thai: ผ้าเบี่ยง, Thai pronunciation: [pʰâː.bìaŋ]), is a traditional Thai shawl-like garment worn by both women and, occasionally, men. It is typically made of silk and consists of a long rectangular piece of fabric, approximately one foot wide, draped diagonally across the chest, covering one shoulder, with the end hanging down the back. The sabai could be worn over a bare upper body or layered atop another piece of clothing.

During the reign of King Chulalongkorn (Rama V, r. 1868–1910), the sabai or pha biang was often paired with Victorian-style garments before Western clothing began to dominate. However, its everyday use later declined under Field Marshal Plaek Phibunsongkhram's 1930s and 1940s cultural mandates promoting Western-style dress. Despite its decline in daily use, the sabai remains a symbol of Thai cultural heritage and is still worn today in traditional ceremonies, classical dance performances, and historical reenactments.

=== Raj pattern ===
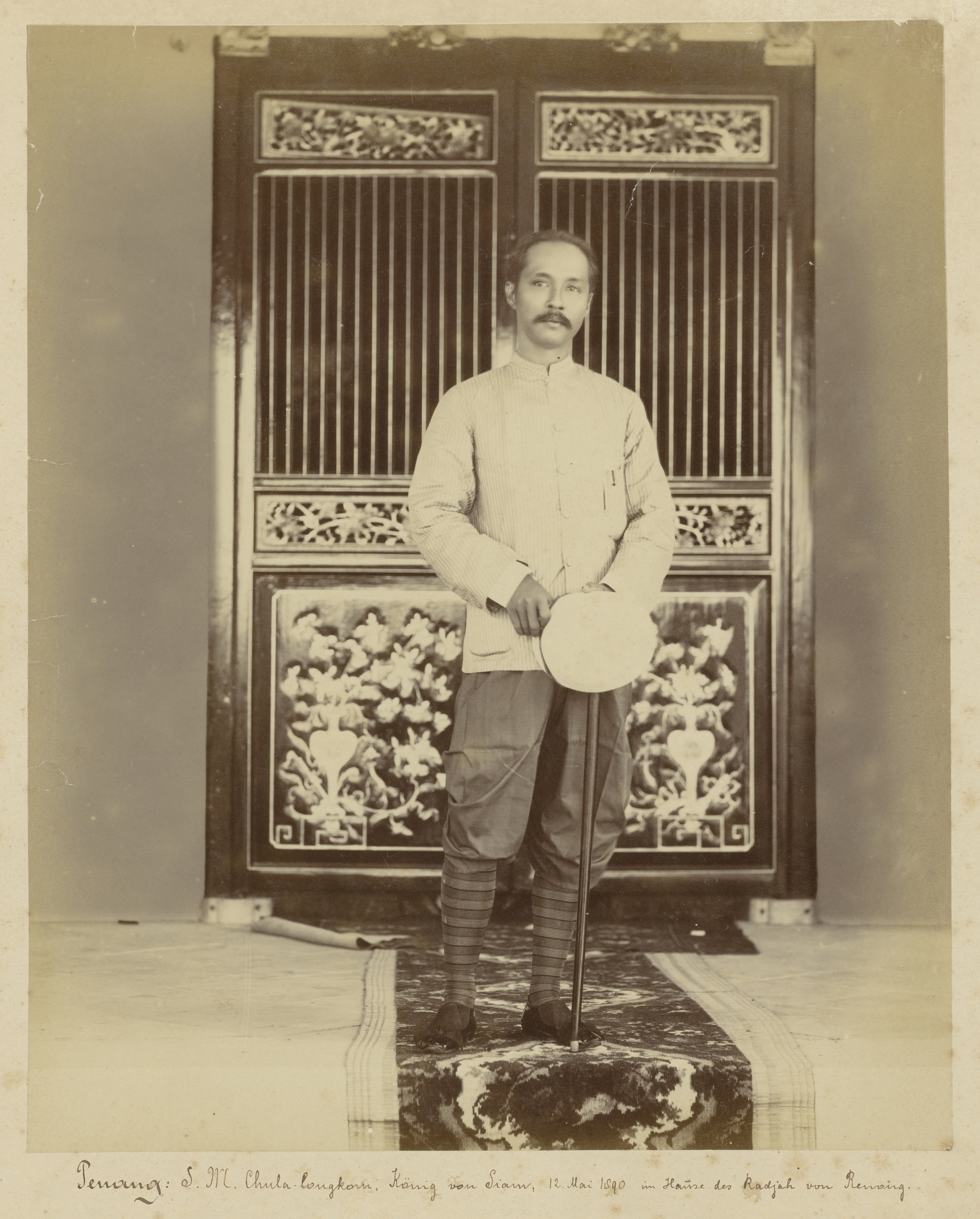
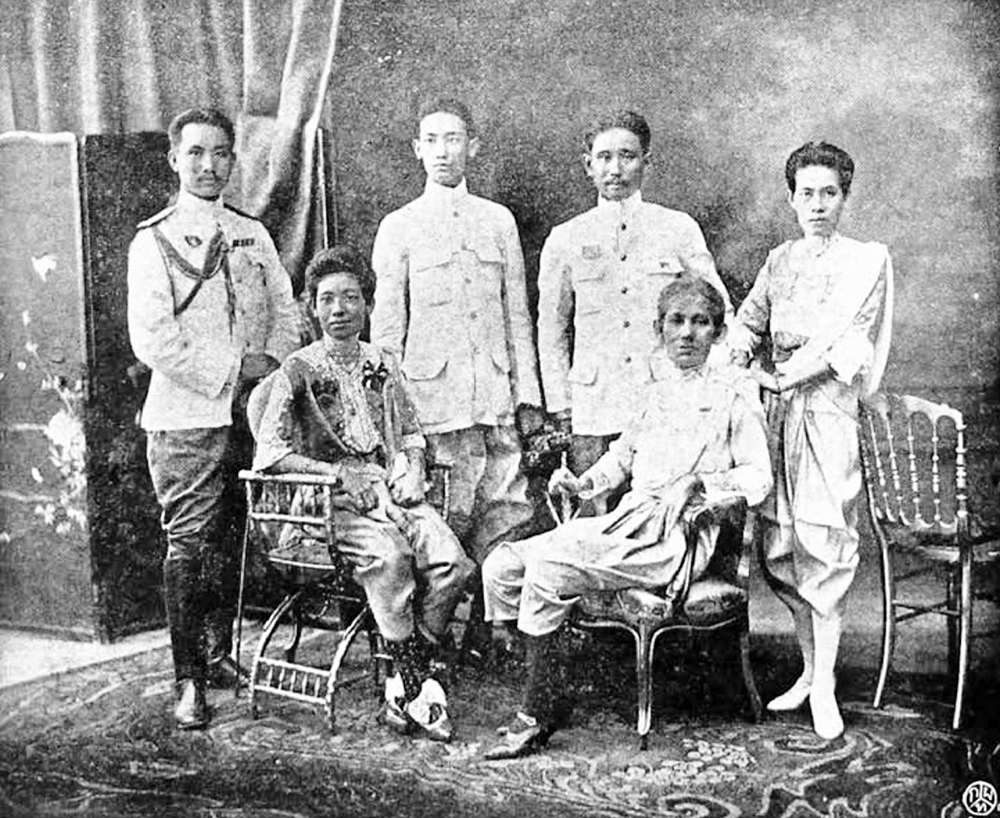
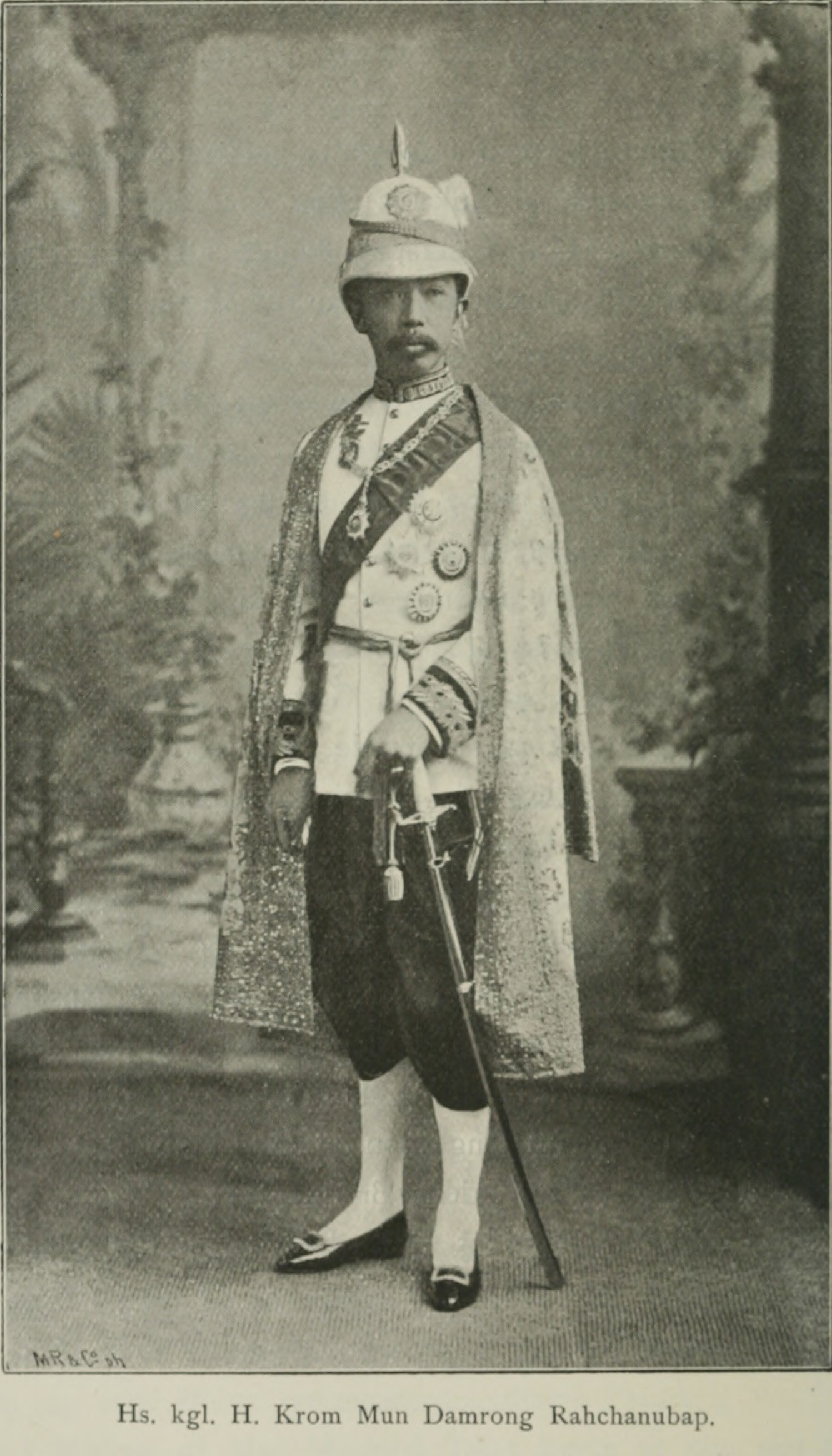
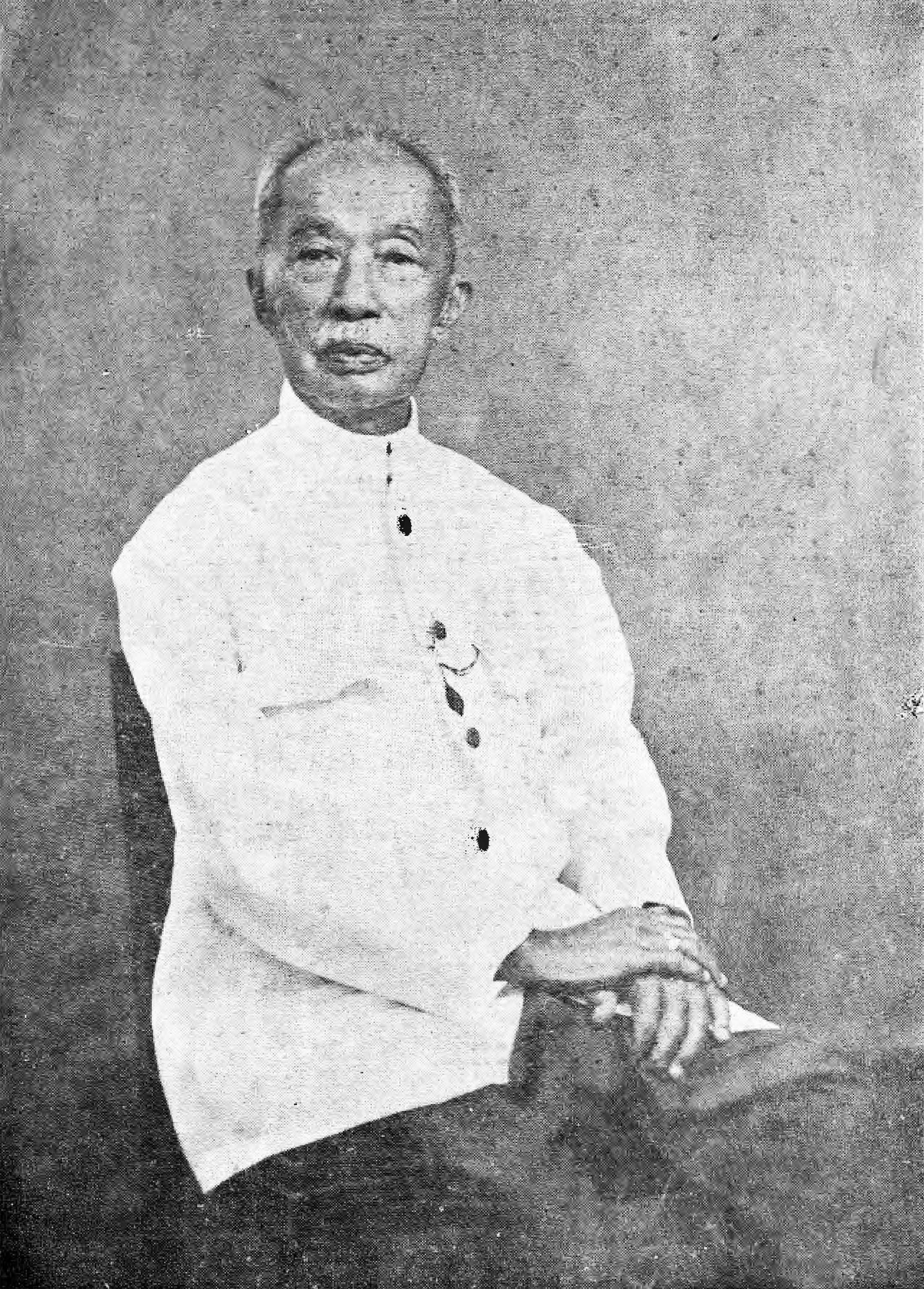
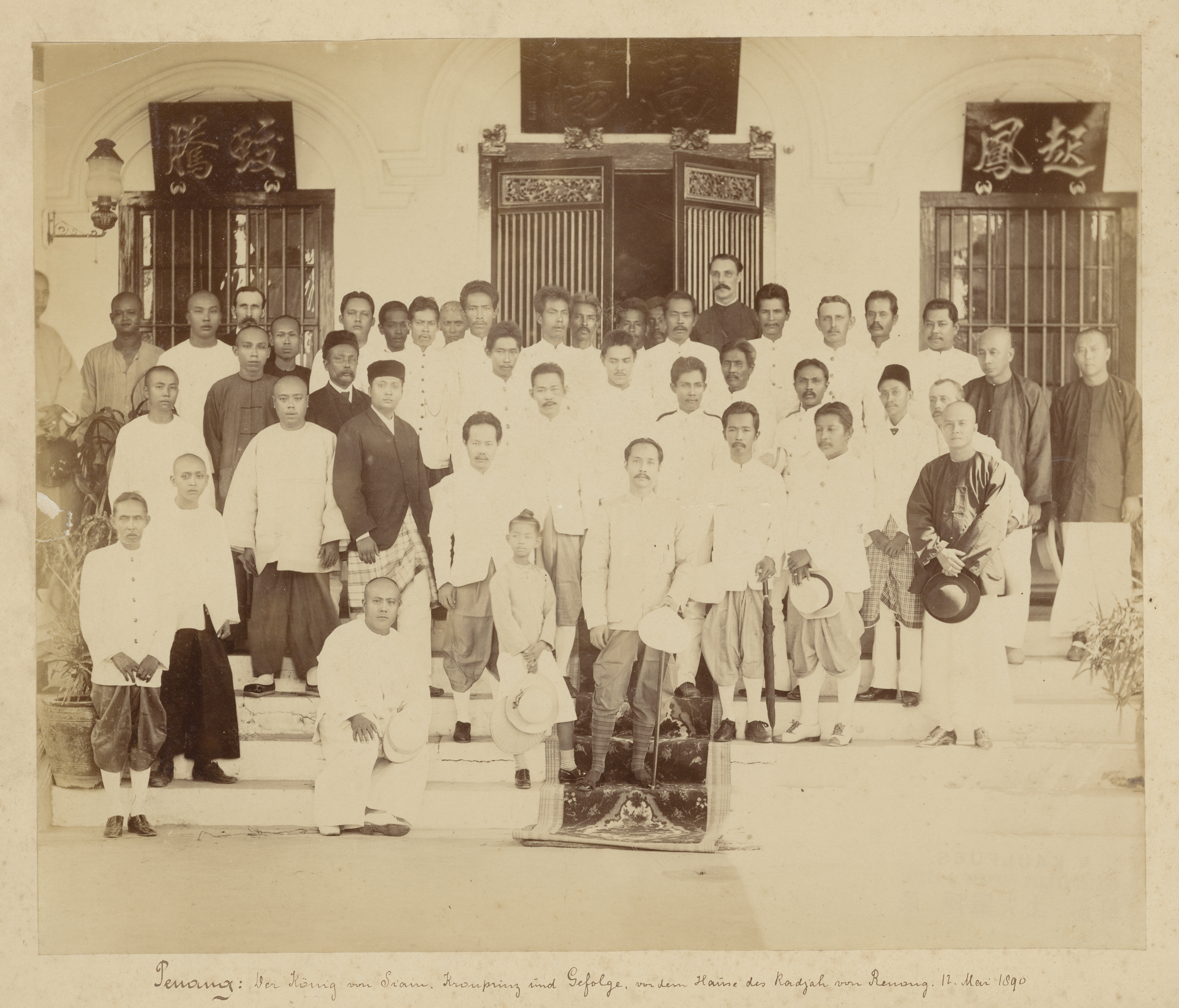
Siamese men wearing raj pattern in the 1800s-1900s

Raj pattern (Thai: ชุดราชปะแตน, Thai pronunciation: [t͡ɕʰút râːt.pà.tɛːn]) refers to a traditional Thai men's outfit, or more specifically, to its signature jacket. It has similarities with the Nehru jacket, but specific characteristics like a five-button front. This formal attire, introduced during the reign of King Chulalongkorn in the late 18th century, typically includes a high-collared white jacket with five buttons, worn with a chong kraben, knee-length socks, and black leather shoes. Originally worn by government officials and the upper class in Siam, it became popular among Bangkok's elite and remains a symbol of national pride today.

In modern times, the Raj pattern is worn in a variety of ceremonial and formal settings, such as royal functions, weddings, ordinations, and even cultural festivals like Loy Krathong. Style adaptations now include the use of premium fabrics like silk or fine cotton, and color variations such as cream, ivory, or even light pastels to suit different themes or skin tones. Some choose to pair the jacket with slacks for a more contemporary look, or coordinate accessories like metallic belts, cufflinks, or minimal jewelry to enhance elegance.

Despite its historical roots, the Raj pattern continues to evolve, blending tradition with modern style for a timeless, dignified appearance.

=== Ham sleeve blouse ===
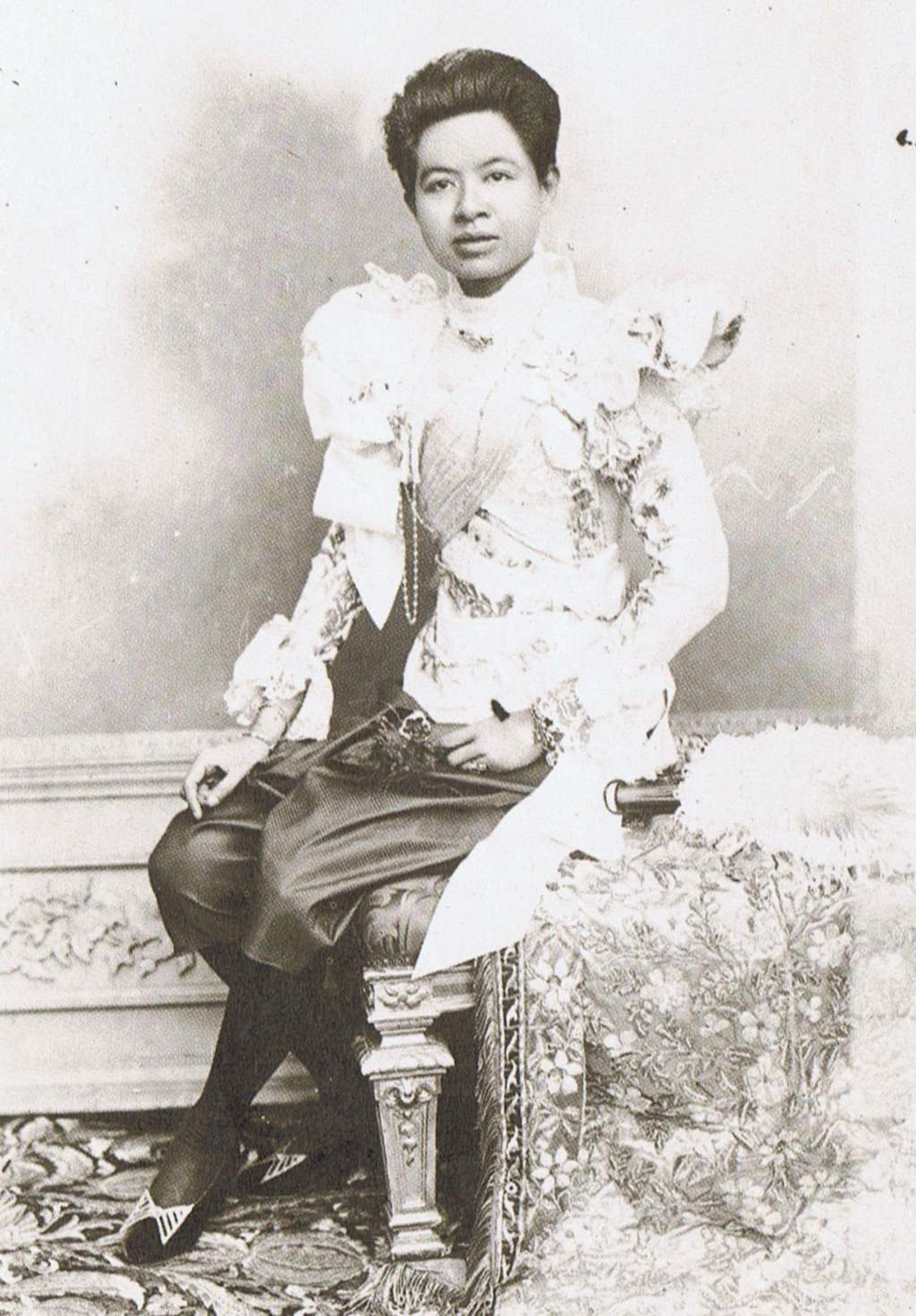
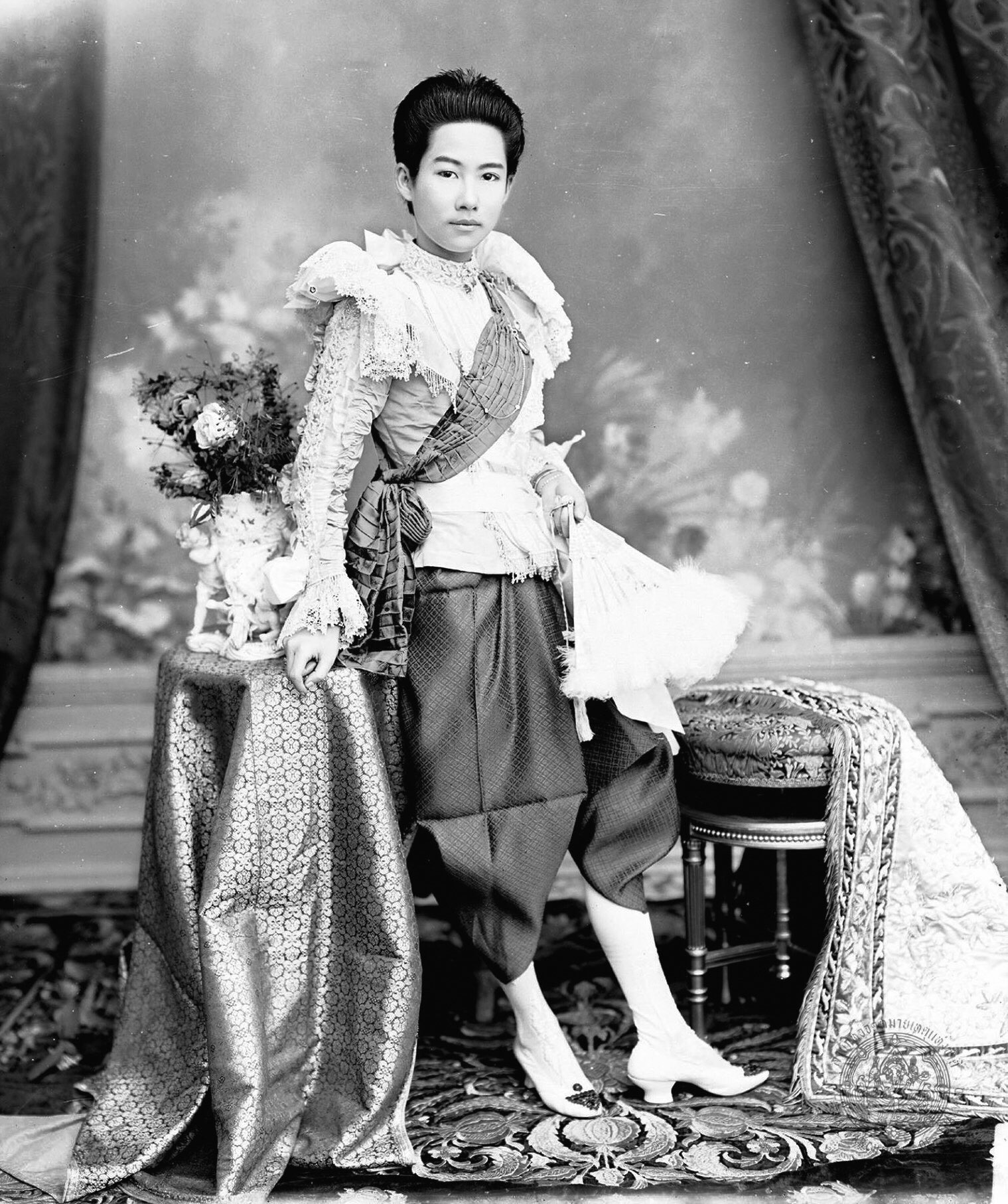
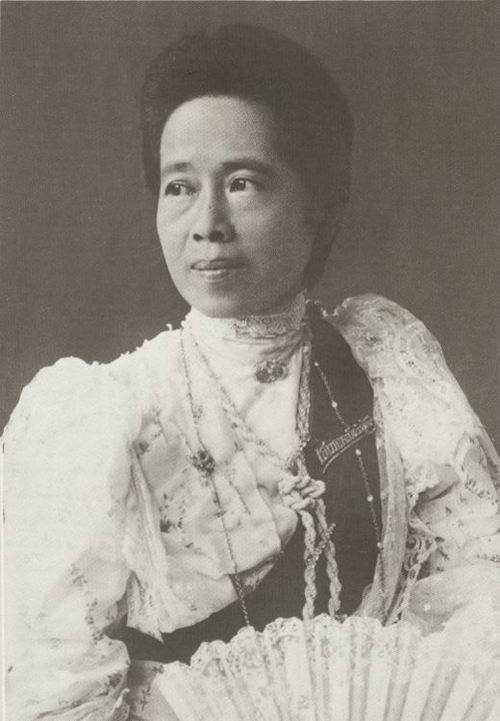
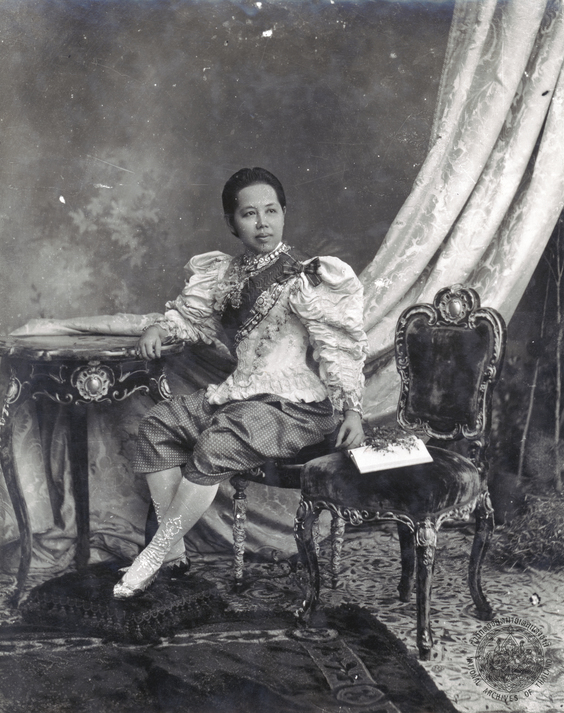
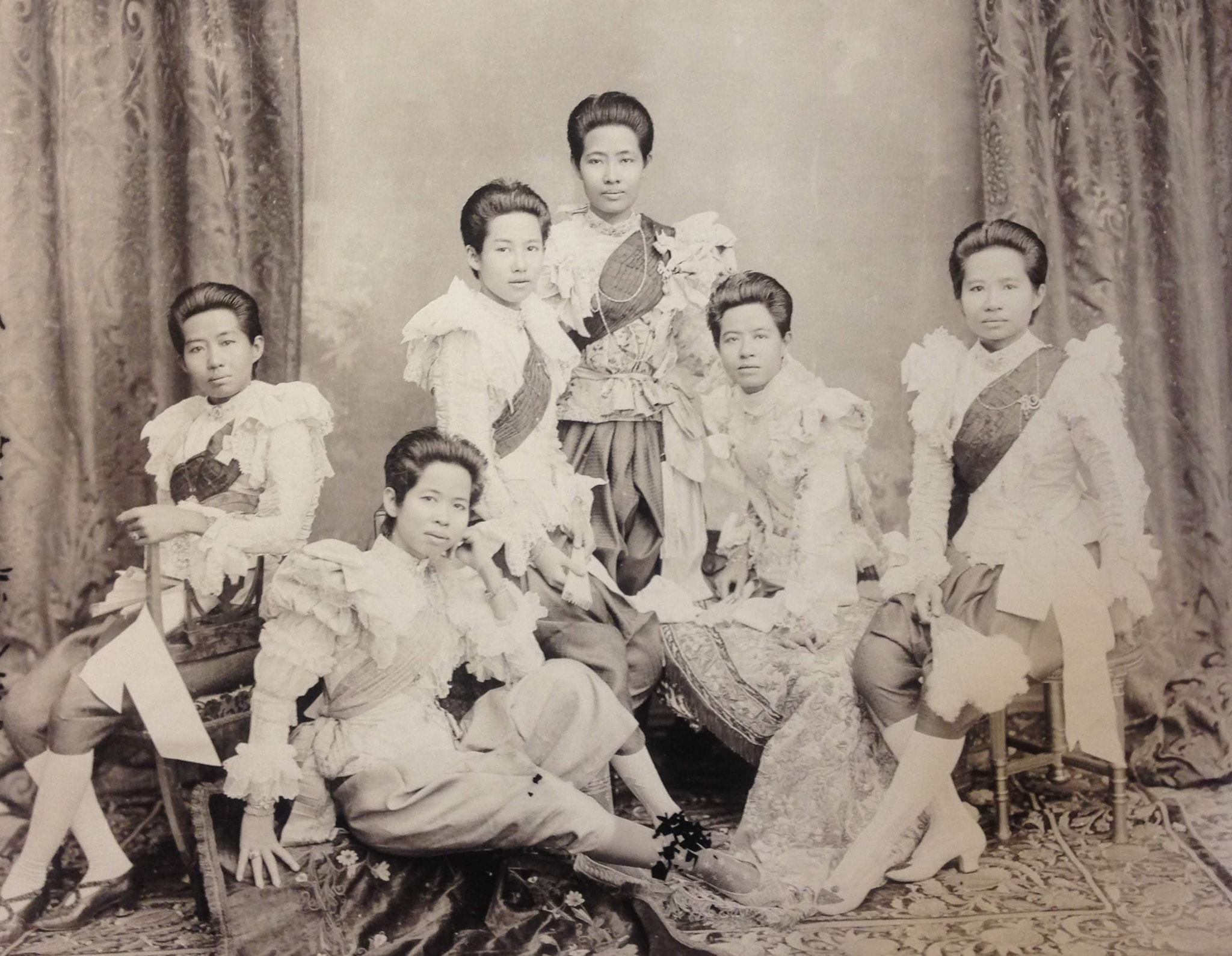
Siamese women in the royal court wearing ham sleeve blouses in the 1800s-1900s.

Ham sleeve blouse (Thai: เสื้อแขนหมูแฮม, Thai pronunciation: [sɯ̂a kʰǎn mǔː hɛ̌ːm]) is a traditional Thai blouse influenced by European women's fashion during the reign of King Chulalongkorn in the Rattanakosin period. It is a fitted lace blouse with ornate lace detailing, a tightly cinched waist, distinctive puffed upper sleeves that gradually narrow toward the tapered wrist.

Historically, The ham sleeve blouse first appeared in the Siamese royal court around 1895-1896. It was influenced by the ceremonial attire of royal ladies from Russian and Austrian courts, and some sources suggest influence from Victorian era England. The sleeve style, known in Europe as the Gigot sleeve or Leg-of-mutton sleeve, was popular among European women in the early and late 19th century.

The blouse was made of European lace with boning for a fitted shape. It featured a high collar, a fitted waist, lace ruffles, and lace panels covering the shoulders and chest. Despite its European adaptation, the outfit retained traditional Siamese elements: wearing a chong kraben, a sabai, hair in a floral bun, long socks, and low-heeled square-toed shoes or boots. Exceptionally, Chao Dara Rasmi paired it with a traditional sin luntaya. Accessories such as folding fans, drop earrings, layered pearl necklaces, and brooches with initials, flowers, or animal motifs complemented the outfit, often coordinated with the garment's color.

In Thailand, the style first appeared in official photographs of Queen Saovabha Phongsri, the Queen Mother, and Chao Chom Manda Chum Krairoek during King Rama V's reign. It remained popular in the royal inner court during the late reign of King Chulalongkorn, but eventually fell out of favor and was replaced by long-sleeved lace blouses that lacked the puffed sleeve.

=== Khrui ===
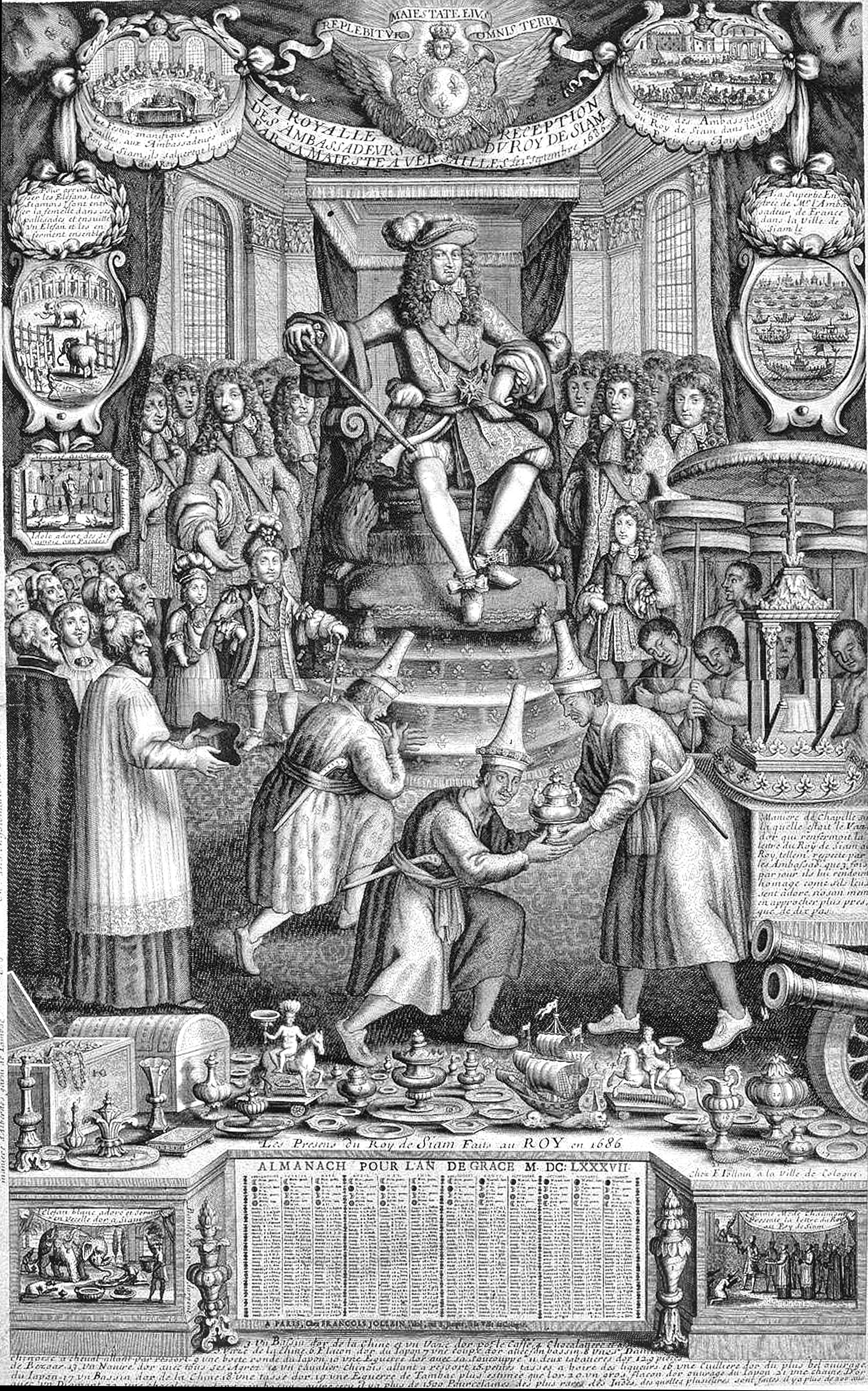
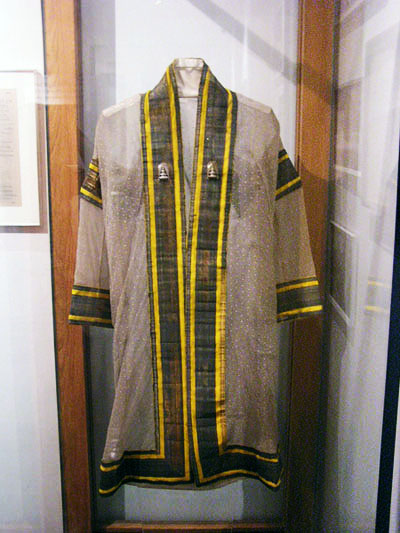
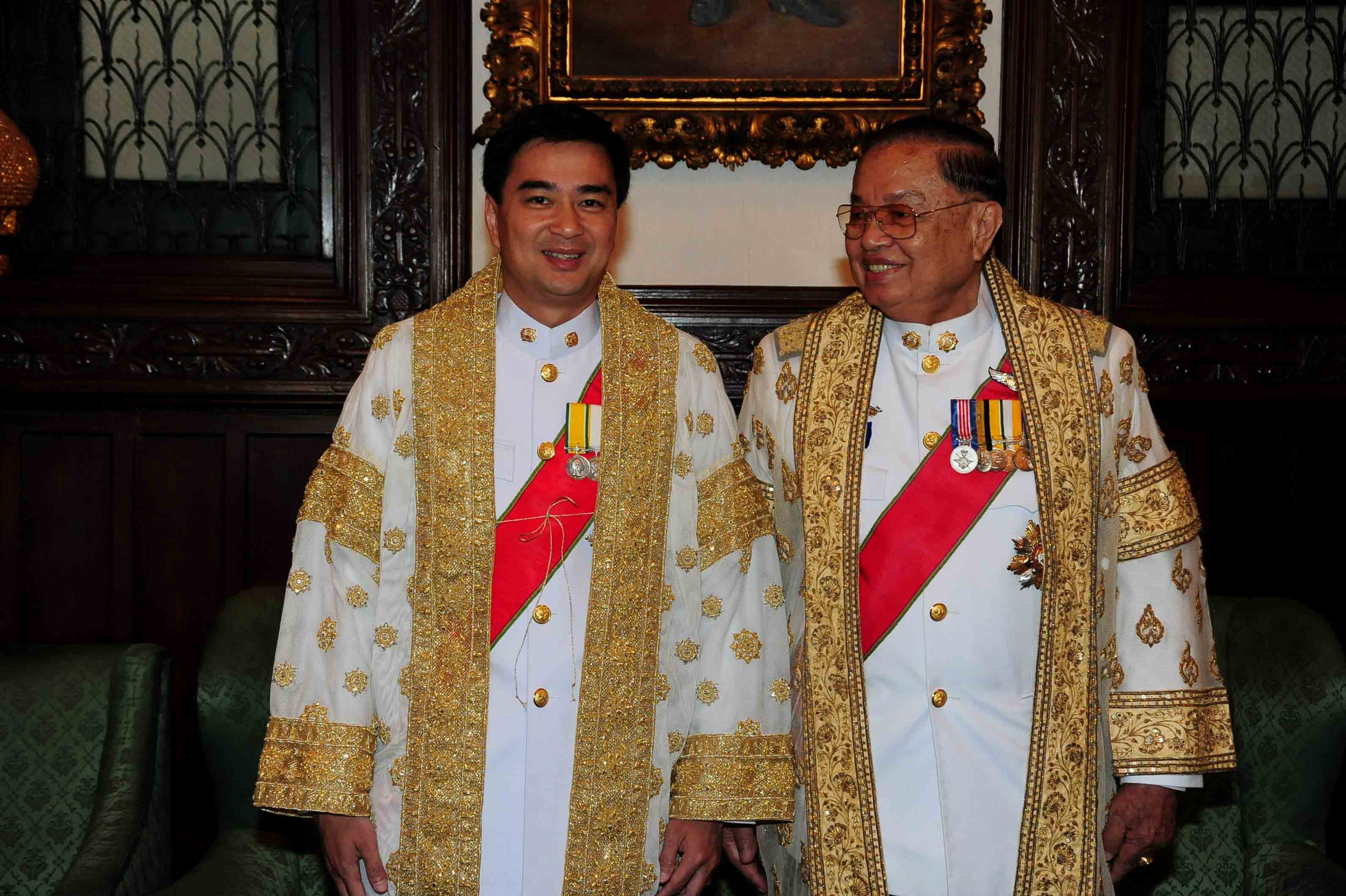
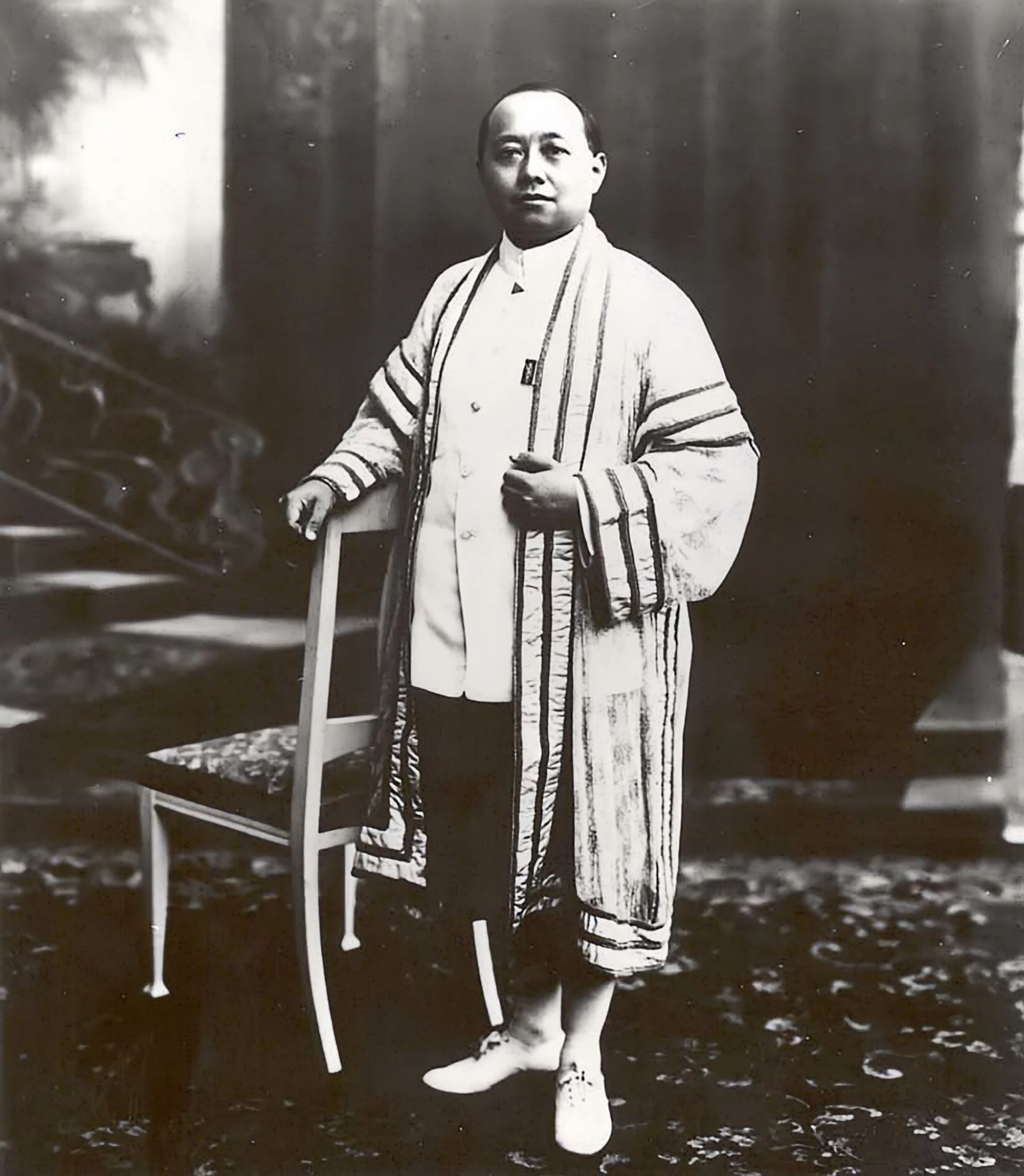
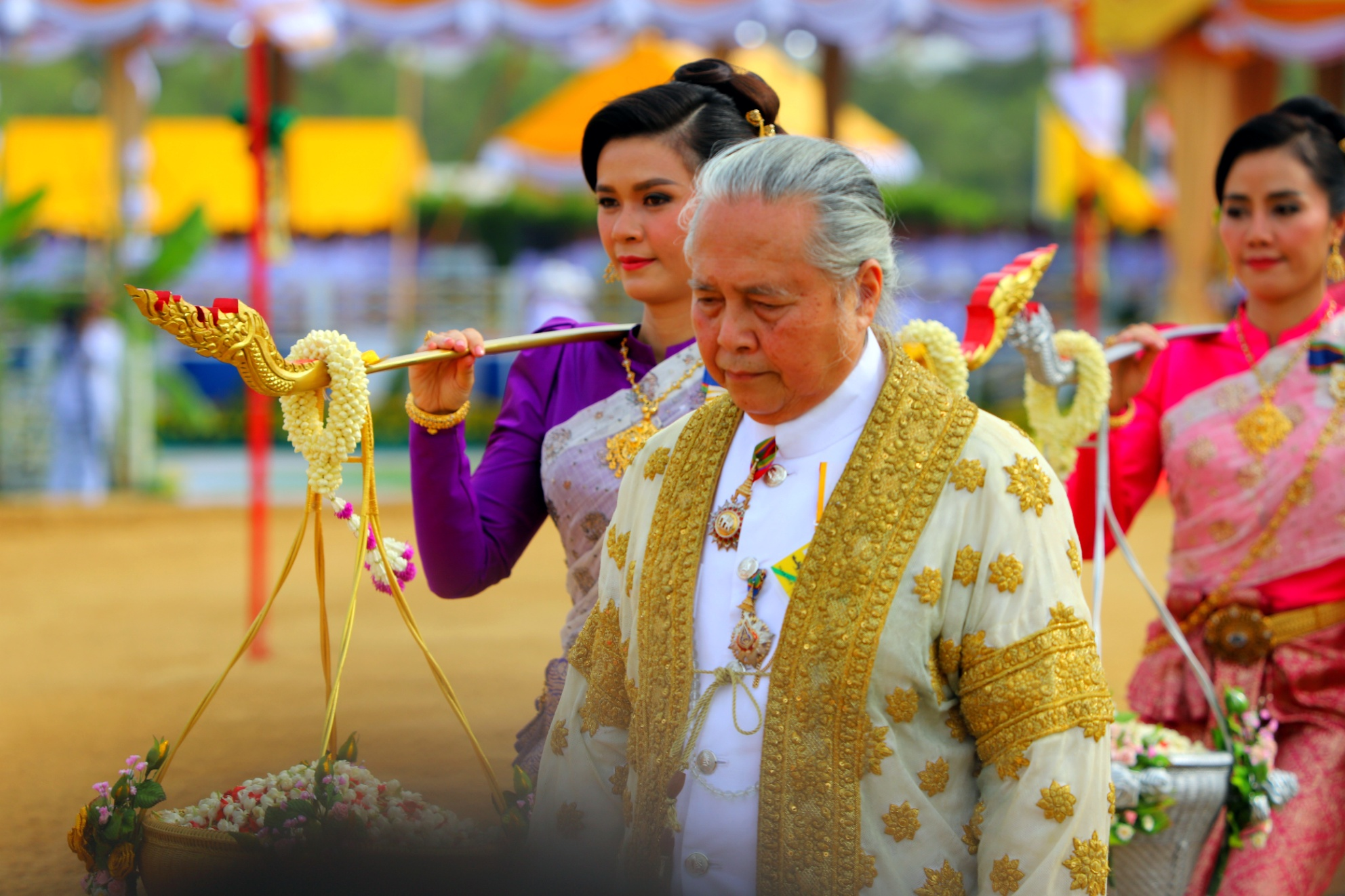
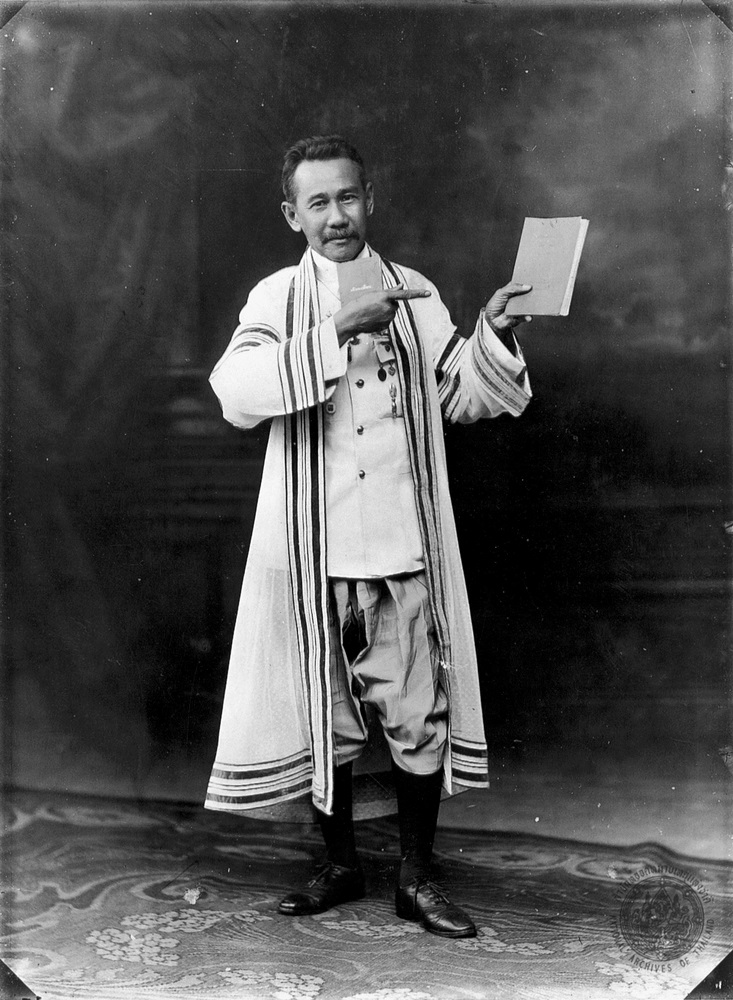
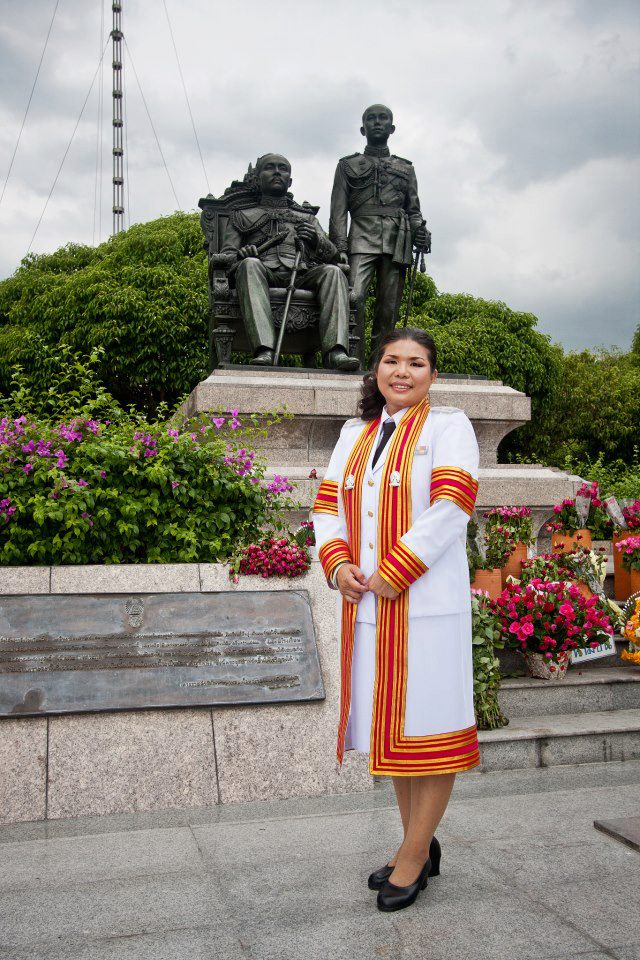
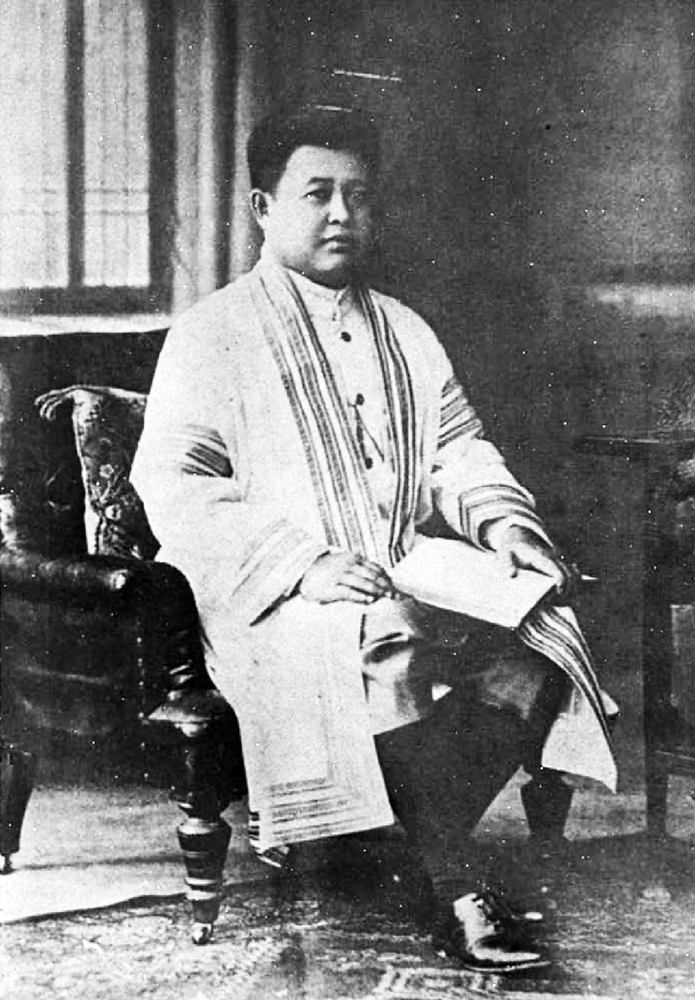
Khrui worn during different social and ceremonial occasions

The Khrui (Thai: ครุย, pronounced [kʰrūi]) is a light outer garment worn as a gown or robe in certain ceremonial settings in Thailand. It is long-sleeved and open at the front, and is made of a sheer or mesh fabric, lined with a band of satin, felt or other material, and may be exquisitely embroidered. Dating from at least the 17th century, it was originally worn only in the royal court, but nowadays is most recognisable as the form of academic dress employed by many universities, especially the Chulalongkorn University.

The origins of the Khrui have been postulated to be of Persian and Indian origin. The earliest documentation of its use are from illustrations of the French embassy to King Narai in 1685 and that of Siam to France in 1686, showing the Siamese king and ambassadors wearing such garments. Use of the khrui continued into the Rattanakosin period, as evidenced by mention in the 1804 Law of Three Seals prohibiting its use by junior government officials.

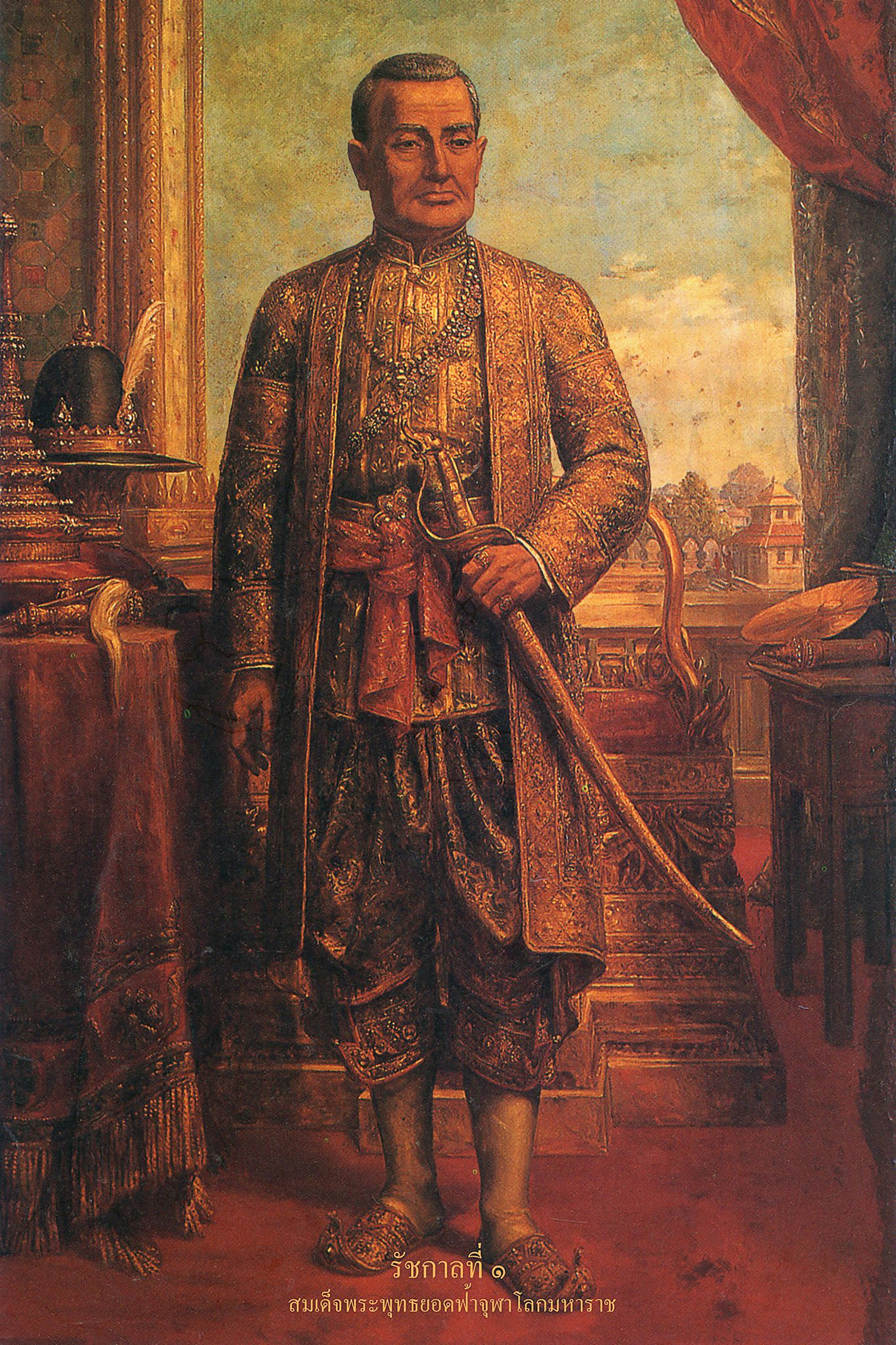
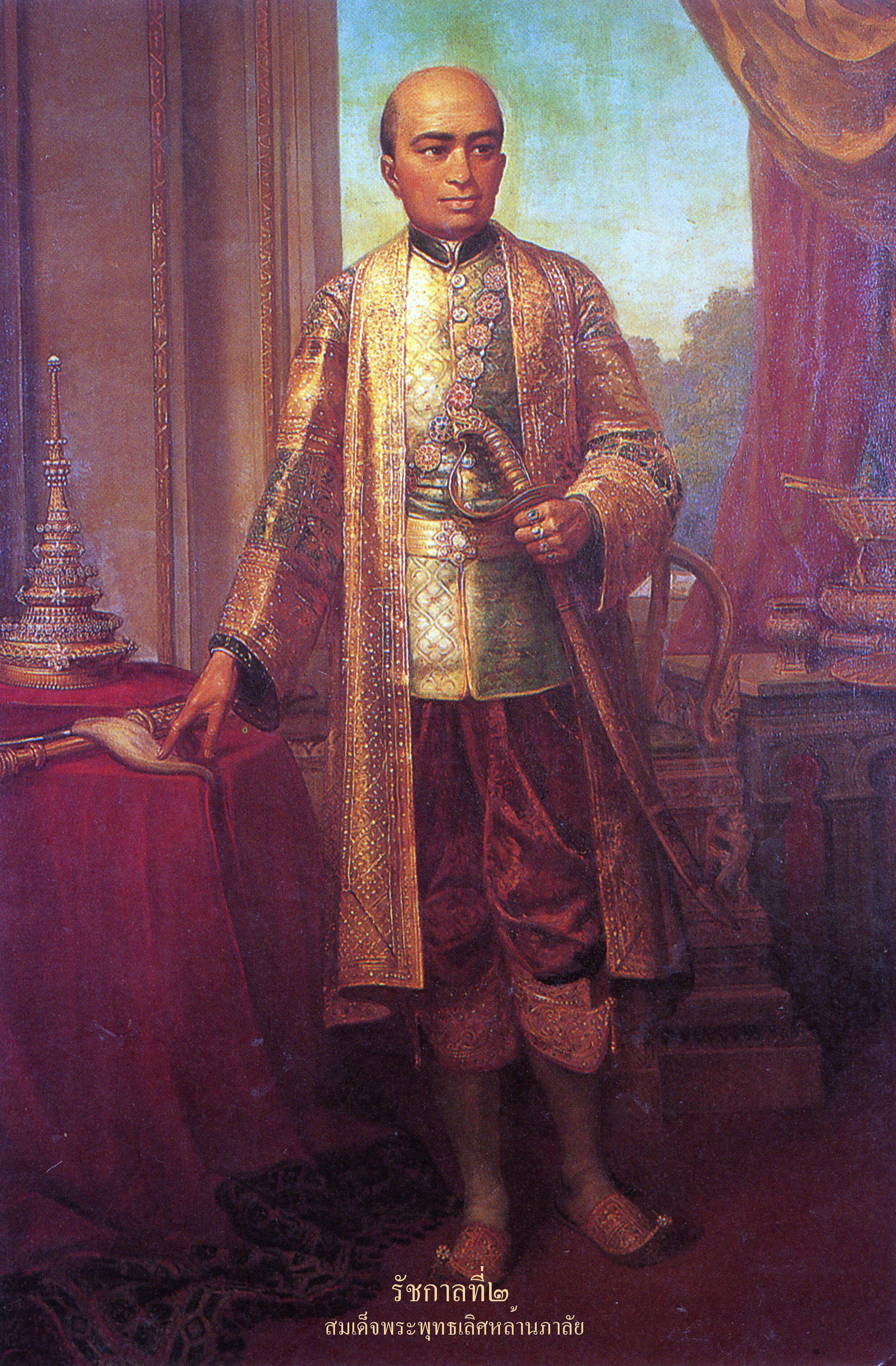
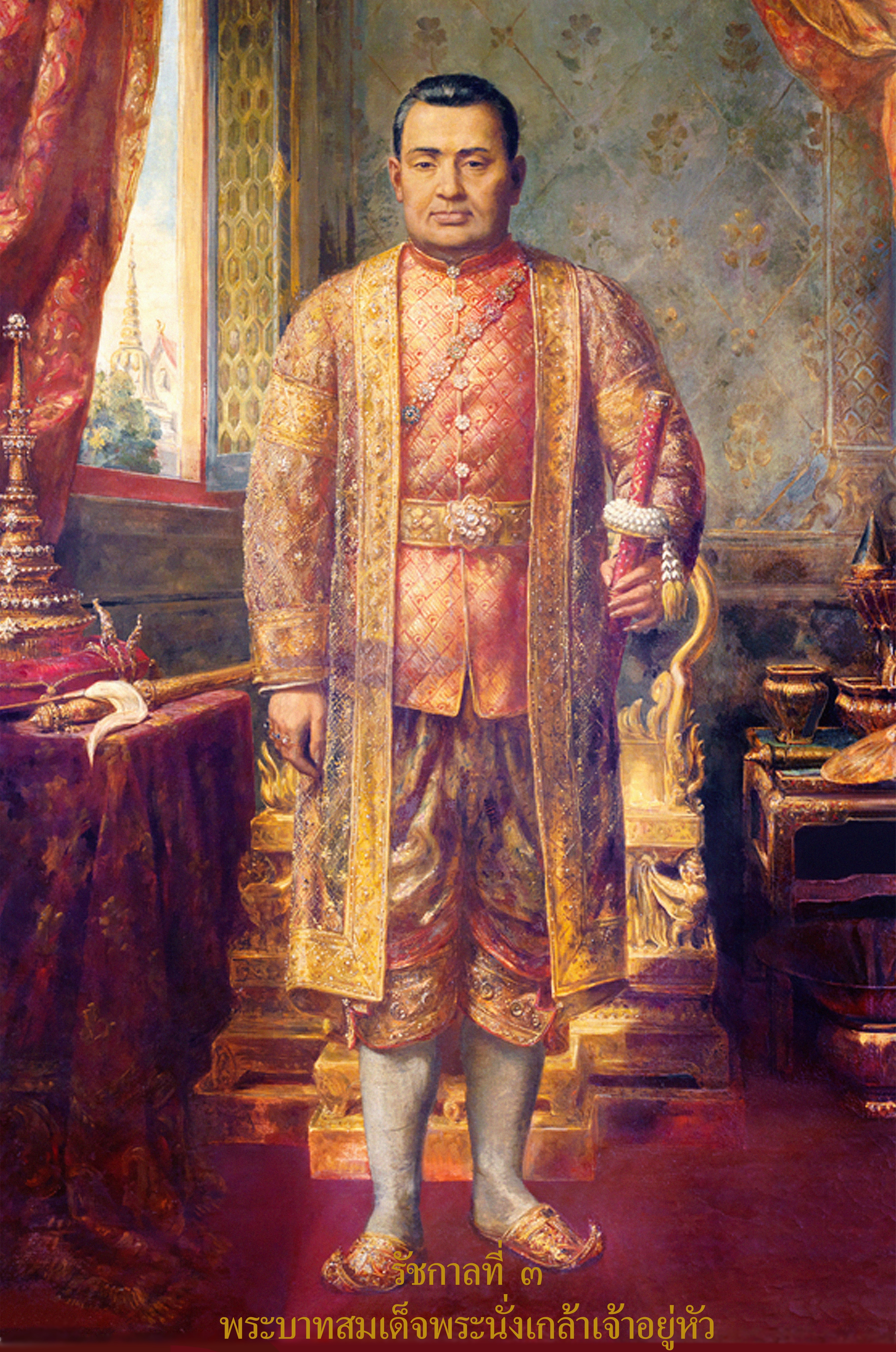
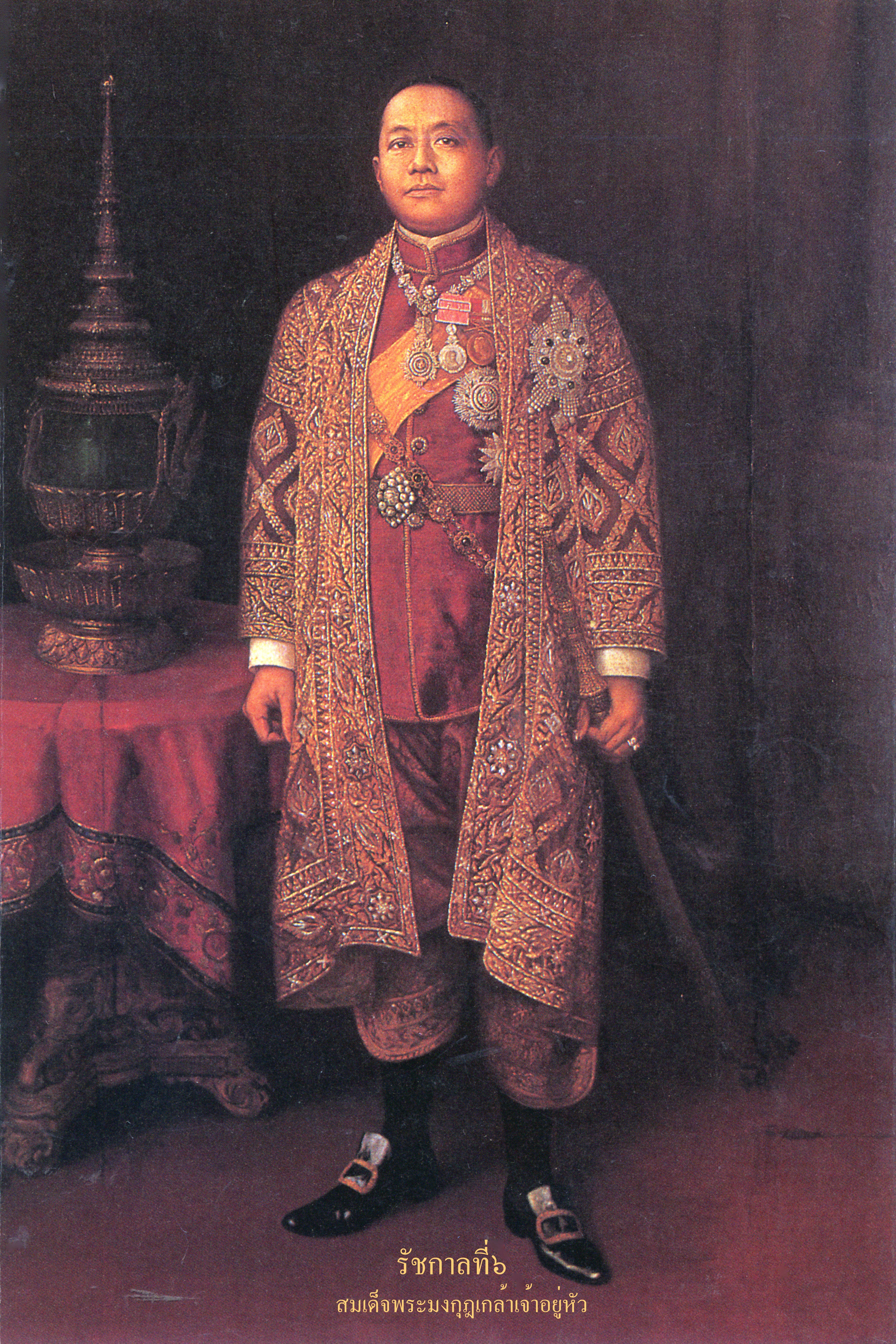
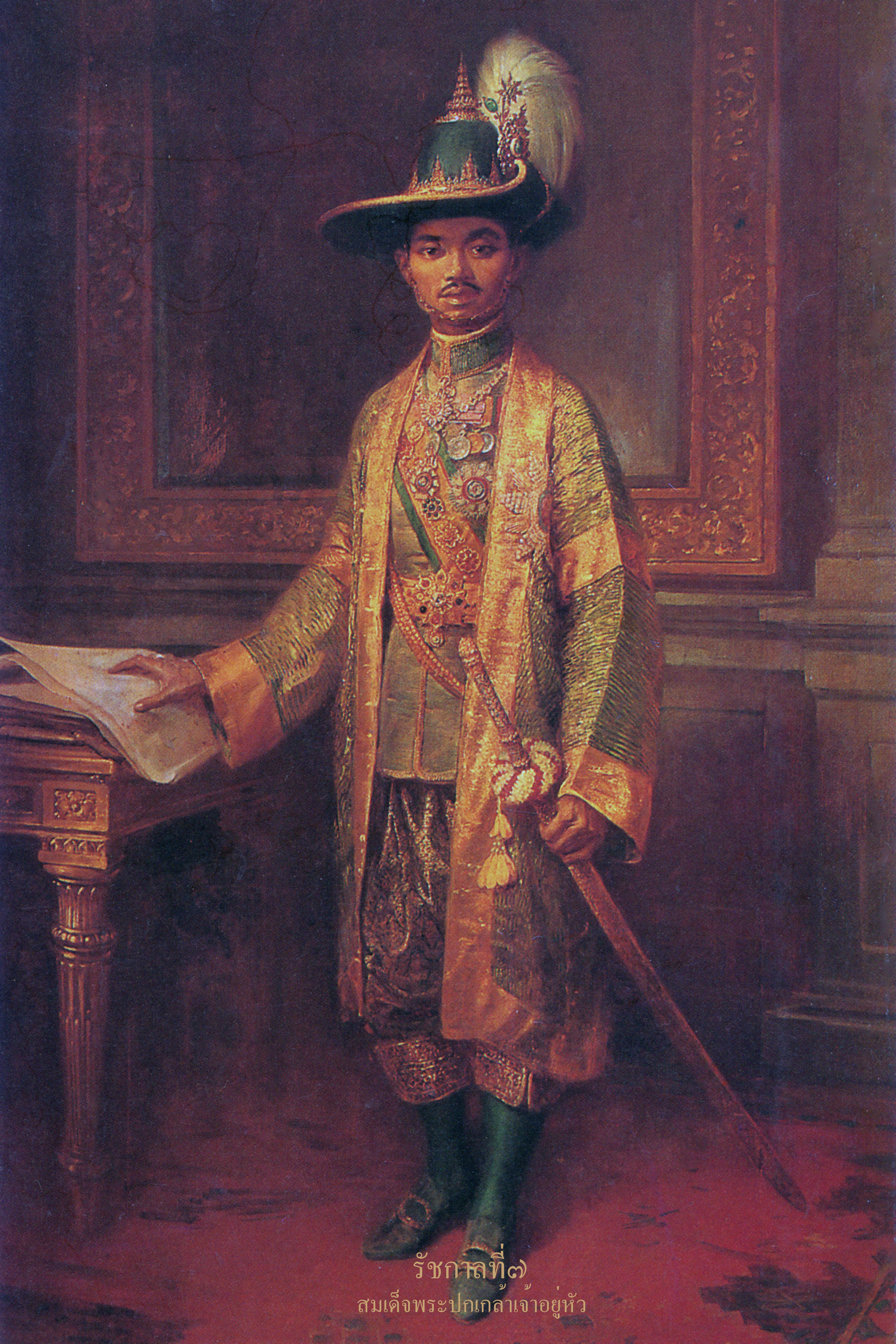
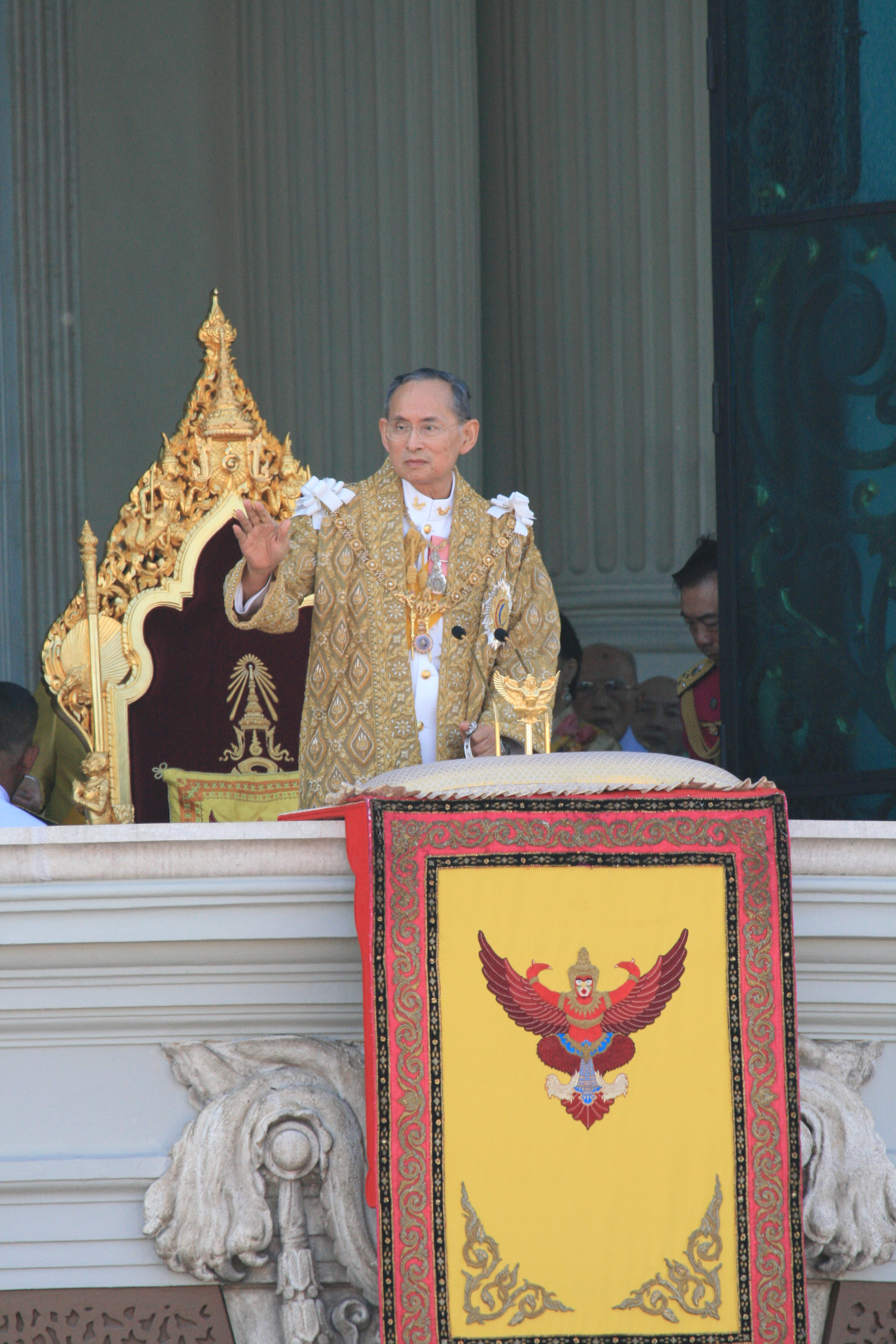
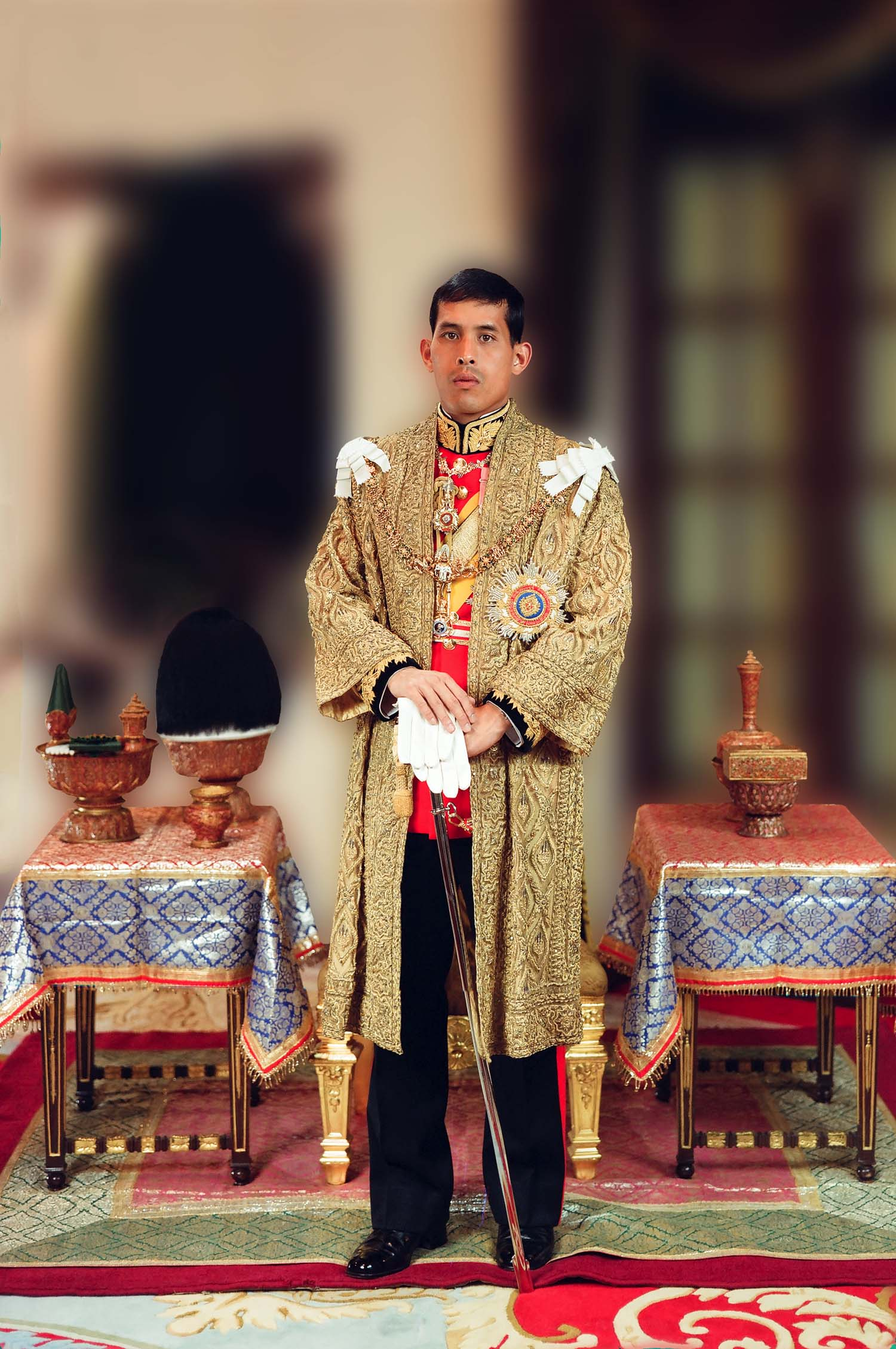
Khrui worn by Thai monarchs of the Chakri dynasty

King Vajiravudh (Rama VI) further codified the khrui's use by royal ordinance in 1912, specifying the different types and ranks to be worn by entitled royals and government officials. He later also granted permission for it to be used as the academic dress of the Royal Pages School (Vajiravudh College) in 1913 and Siam's Bar association in 1915. It was adopted as the academic dress for graduates of Chulalongkorn University in 1930. Since 1967, some other universities have also adopted the khrui as their academic regalia, and the term khrui has acquired the more general meaning of any style of academic or court dress.

=== Pha khao ma ===
Pha khao ma (Thai: ผ้าขาวม้า Thai pronunciation: [pʰâː kʰǎw máː]) is a versatile plaid fabric woven for centuries in Thailand. It serves numerous purposes, including being worn as a waistband by Thai men, used as a handkerchief, fan, or head covering to protect against the sun, and even used as a makeshift cradle or to carry goods. The cloth's practicality and sustainability have attracted the attention of designers in the fashion and interior design industries. The word Khao ma is derived from the Persian word Kamarband, meaning waistband or belt. This cloth has become an omnipresent item in Thai society. Its recognition as a national cultural heritage in Thailand and nomination for UNESCO World Heritage status in 2027.

=== Tabengman ===
Tabengman (Thai: ตะเบงมาน Thai pronunciation: [tá.bēng.māːn]) is a traditional Thai cloth that originated during the late Ayutthaya period. It consists of a piece of cloth that covers the chest and is tied behind the neck. It remains an important part of Thailand's cultural heritage and history, and continues to inspire contemporary fashion designers and artists. It has been featured in national and international events, and the clothing worn by the main character in the 2021 Disney film Raya and the Last Dragon, which is inspired by traditional Southeast Asian cloth including Tabengman.

== Regional costumes ==
The various regions and ethnic groups of Thailand have rich and distinctive clothing and textile traditions, with each community expressing its cultural identity through unique patterns, weaving techniques, and garment styles.

=== Suea pat ===
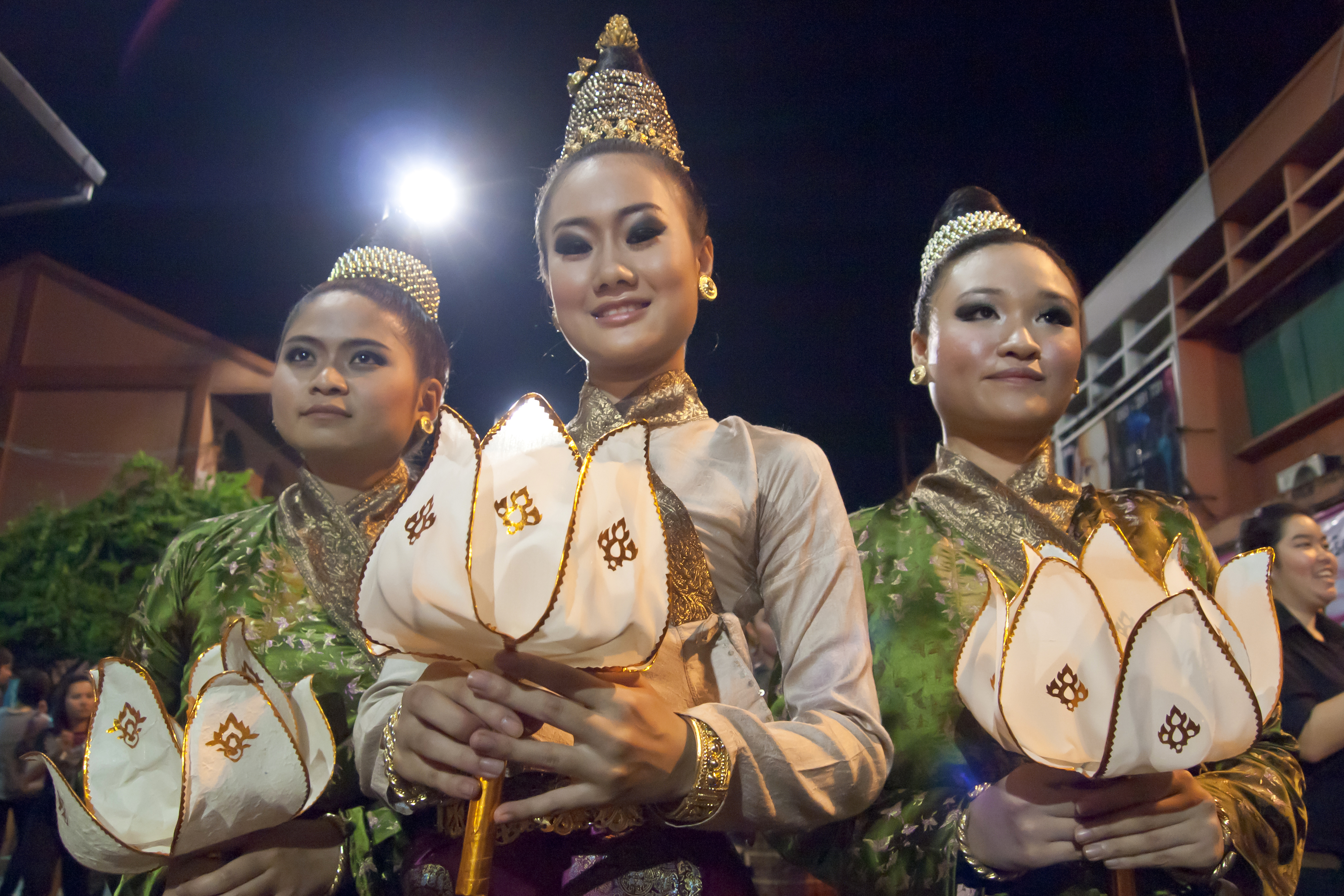
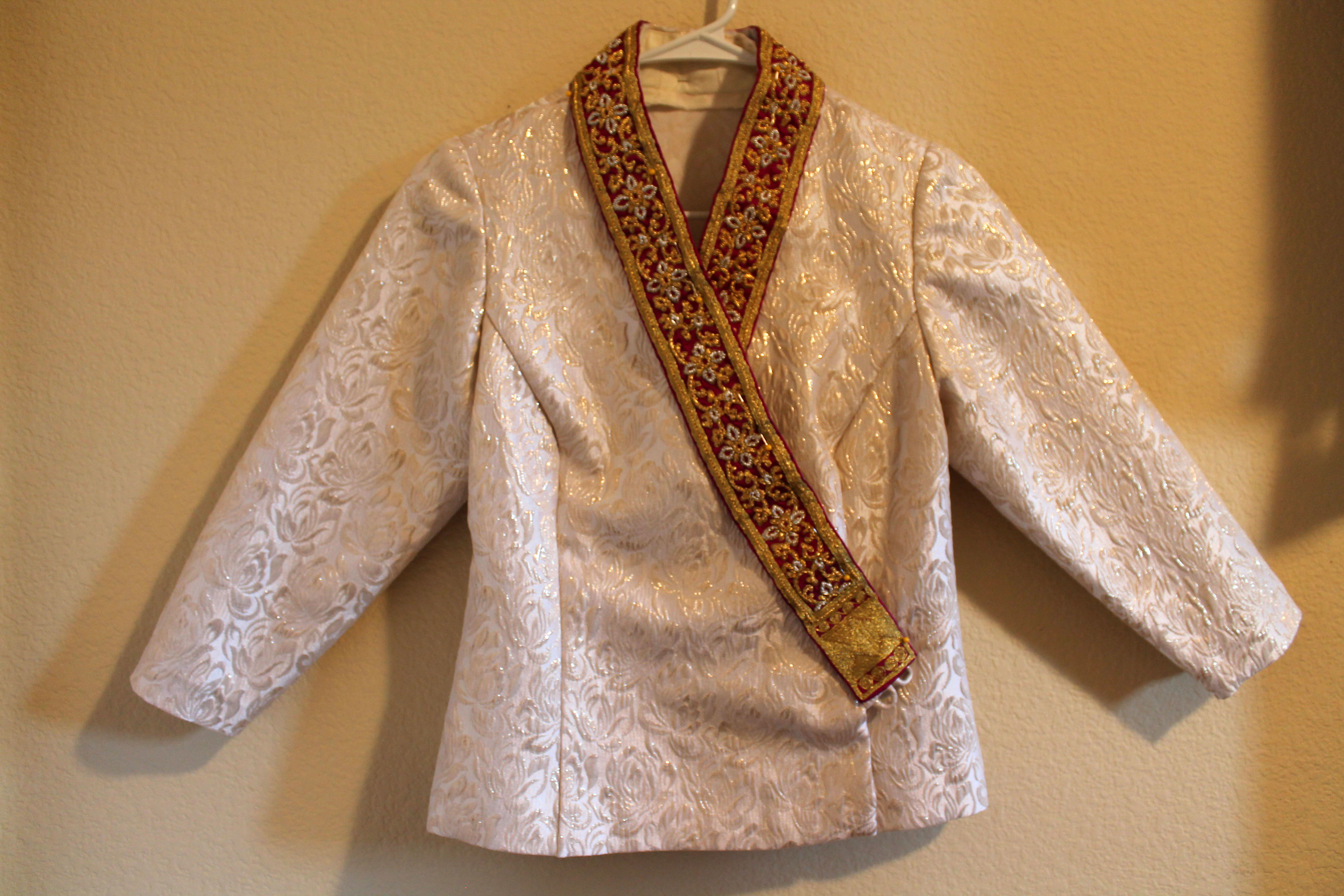
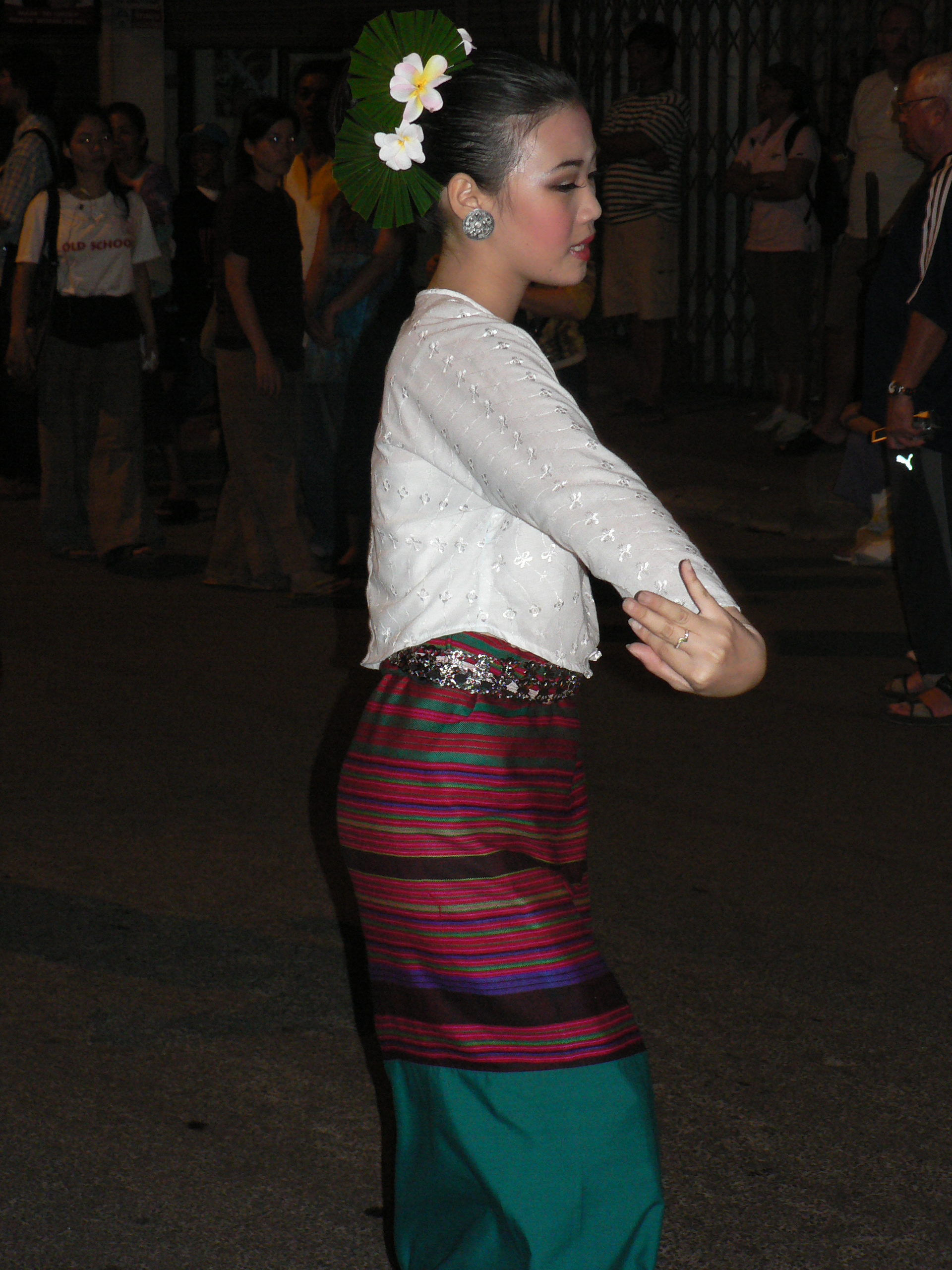
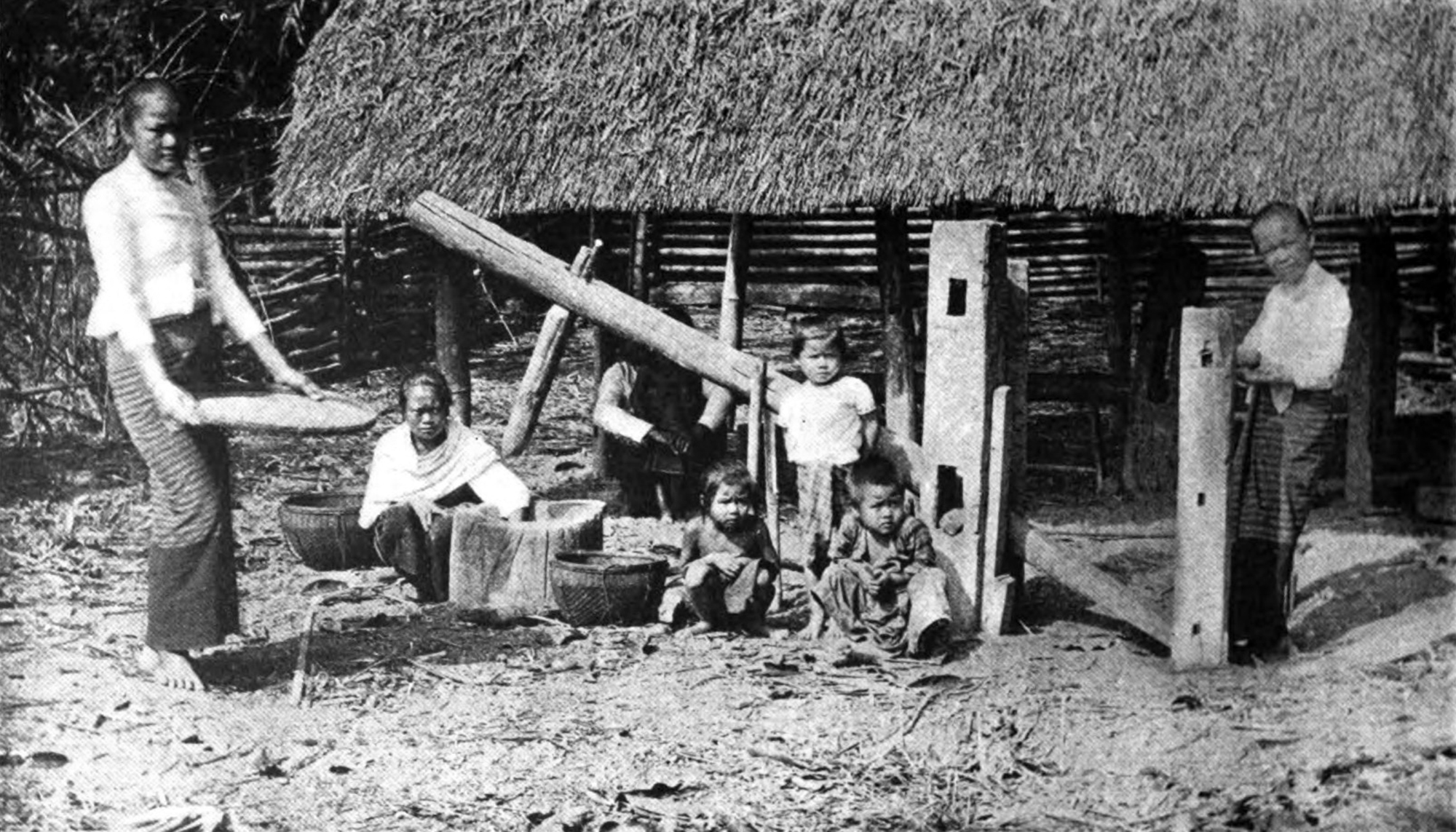
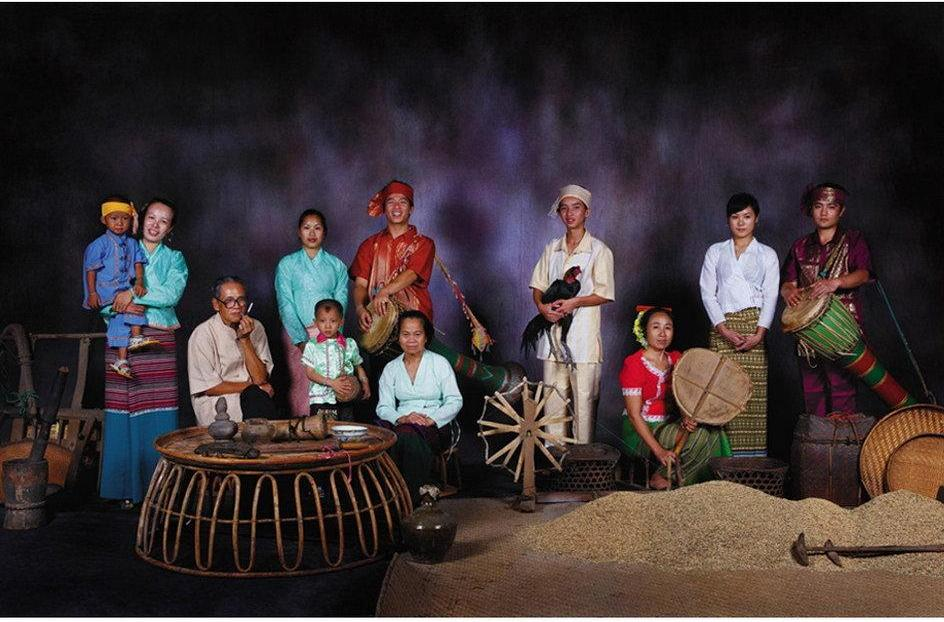
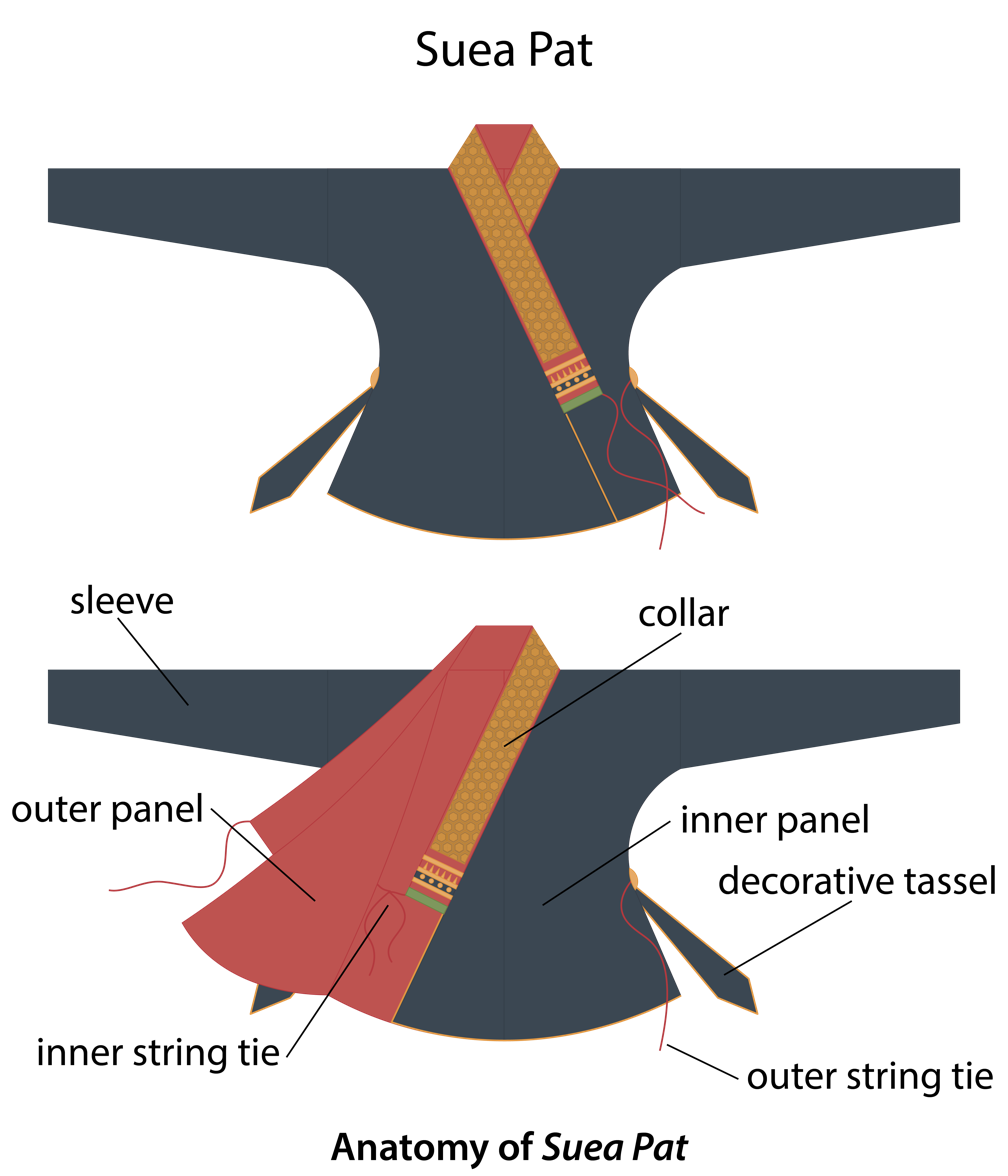
Suea pat in northern Thailand and neighboring countries

Suea pat (Thai: เสื้อปัด, Thai pronunciation: [sɯ̂a.pàt]) is a traditional long-sleeved blouse commonly worn by women in the Northern Thailand, Laos and among the Tai ethnics, particularly in the historical region of Lanna. Characterized by its lack of buttons, the blouse is worn by wrapping the right side of the front panel over the left, and securing it with fabric ties or strings. The design provides both elegance and practicality, suitable for the region's temperate climate and cultural customs.

Historically, the suea pat was an essential part of Lanna women's traditional dress, often paired with a sabai (shawl) and a sin (tubular skirt). It was especially popular in Chiang Mai, Lamphun, and other northern provinces, where it featured in both everyday wear and formal attire. The materials and patterns of suea pat garments varied according to the wearer’s social status, with handwoven cotton used for daily use and finer silk versions reserved for ceremonies and festivals.

The suea pat reflects the aesthetic values and craftsmanship of Northern Thai textile culture, including the use of natural dyes, intricate weaving techniques, and motifs unique to Lanna identity. Although Western-style clothing became more dominant in the 20th century, the suea pat remains an important cultural garment and is still worn during traditional events, temple festivals, and regional cultural celebrations. Its continued presence in modern Thai fashion underscores the ongoing revival and appreciation of local heritage.

=== Banong ===
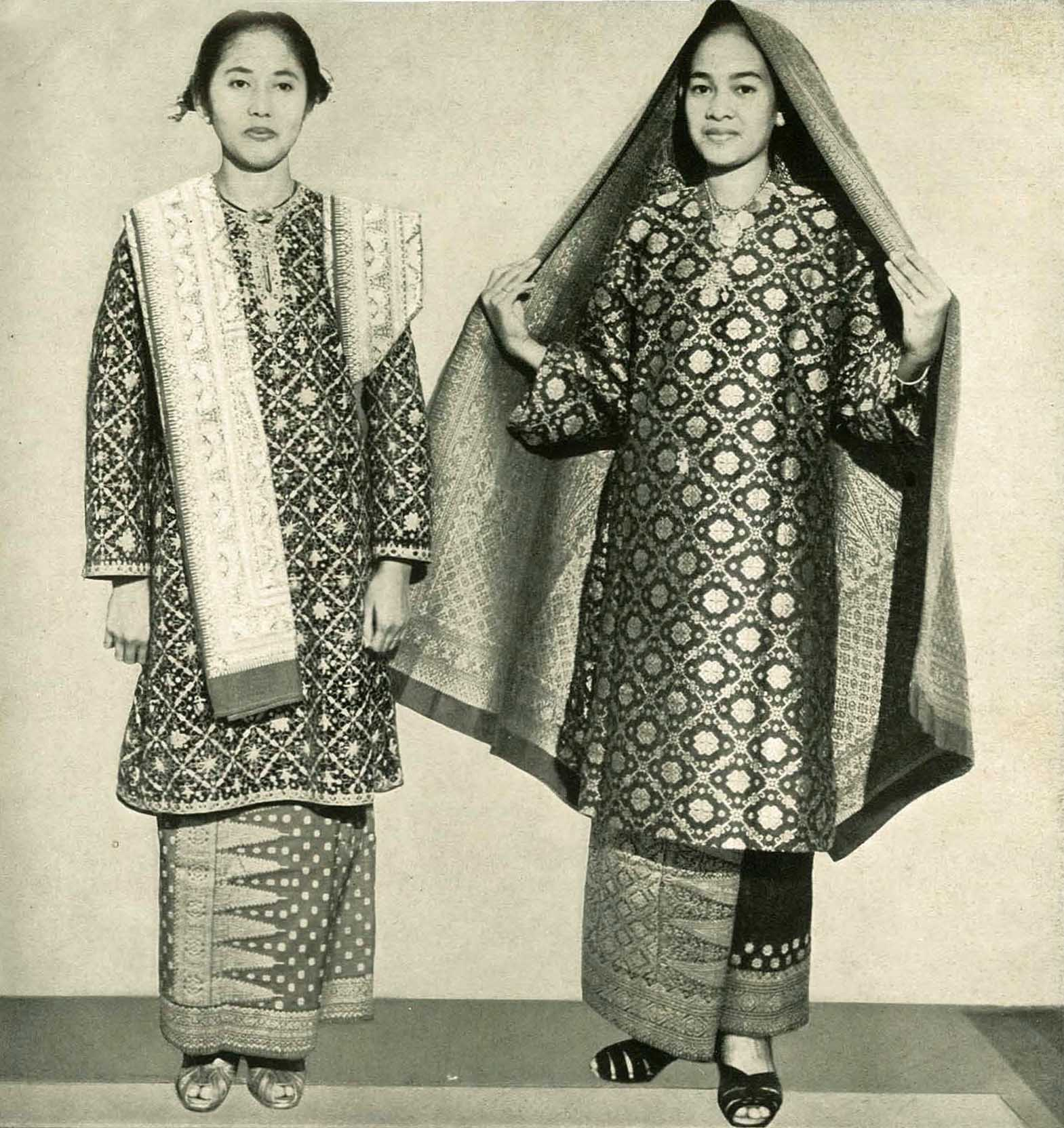
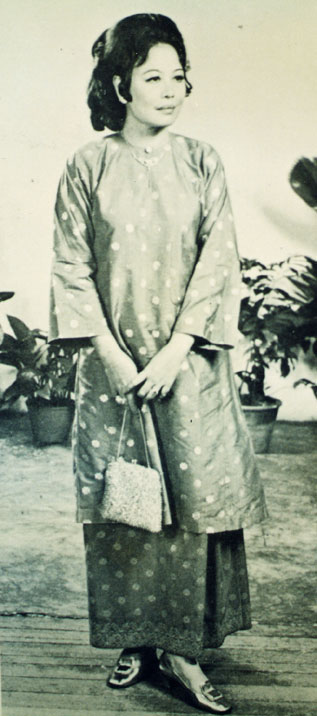
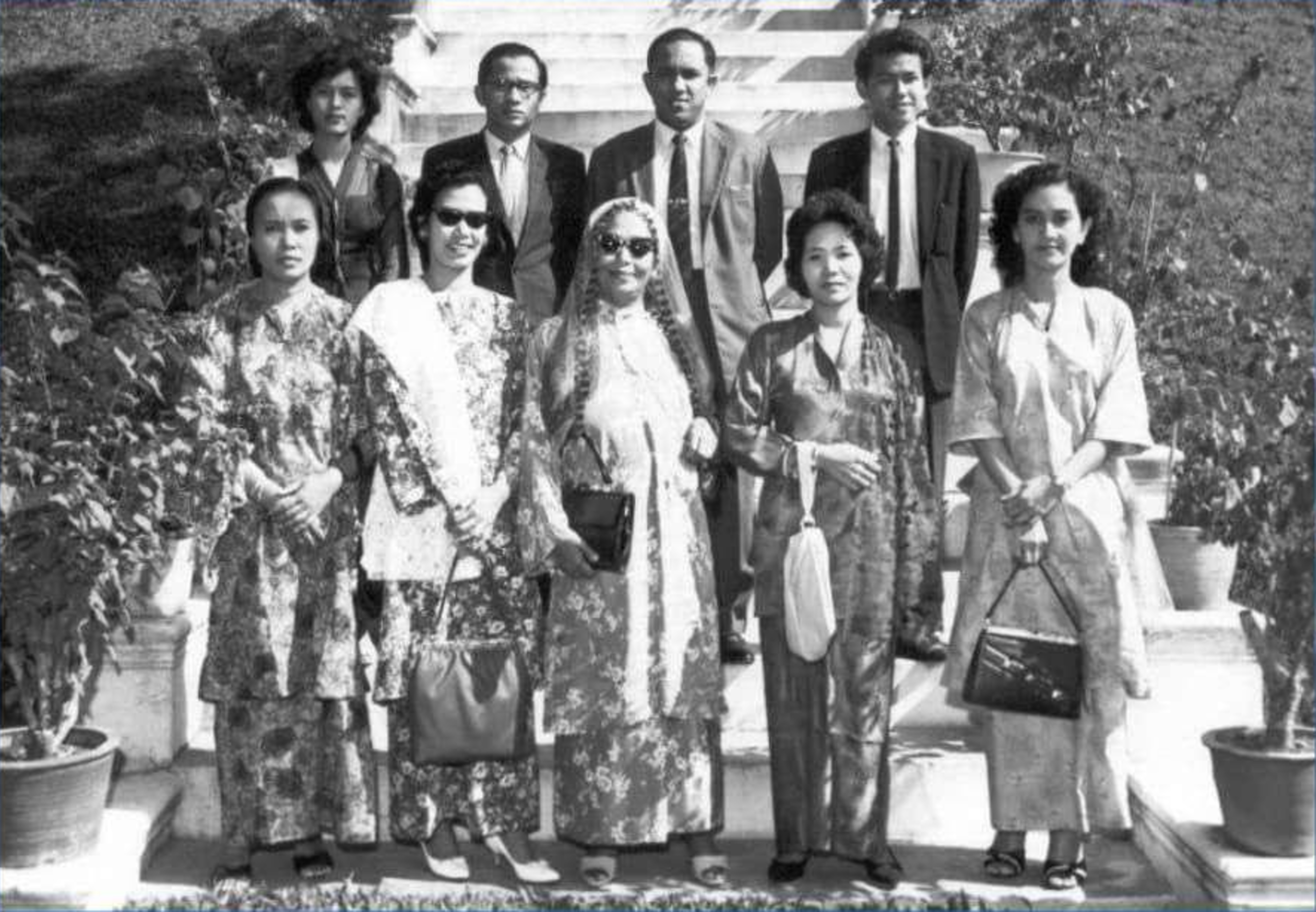
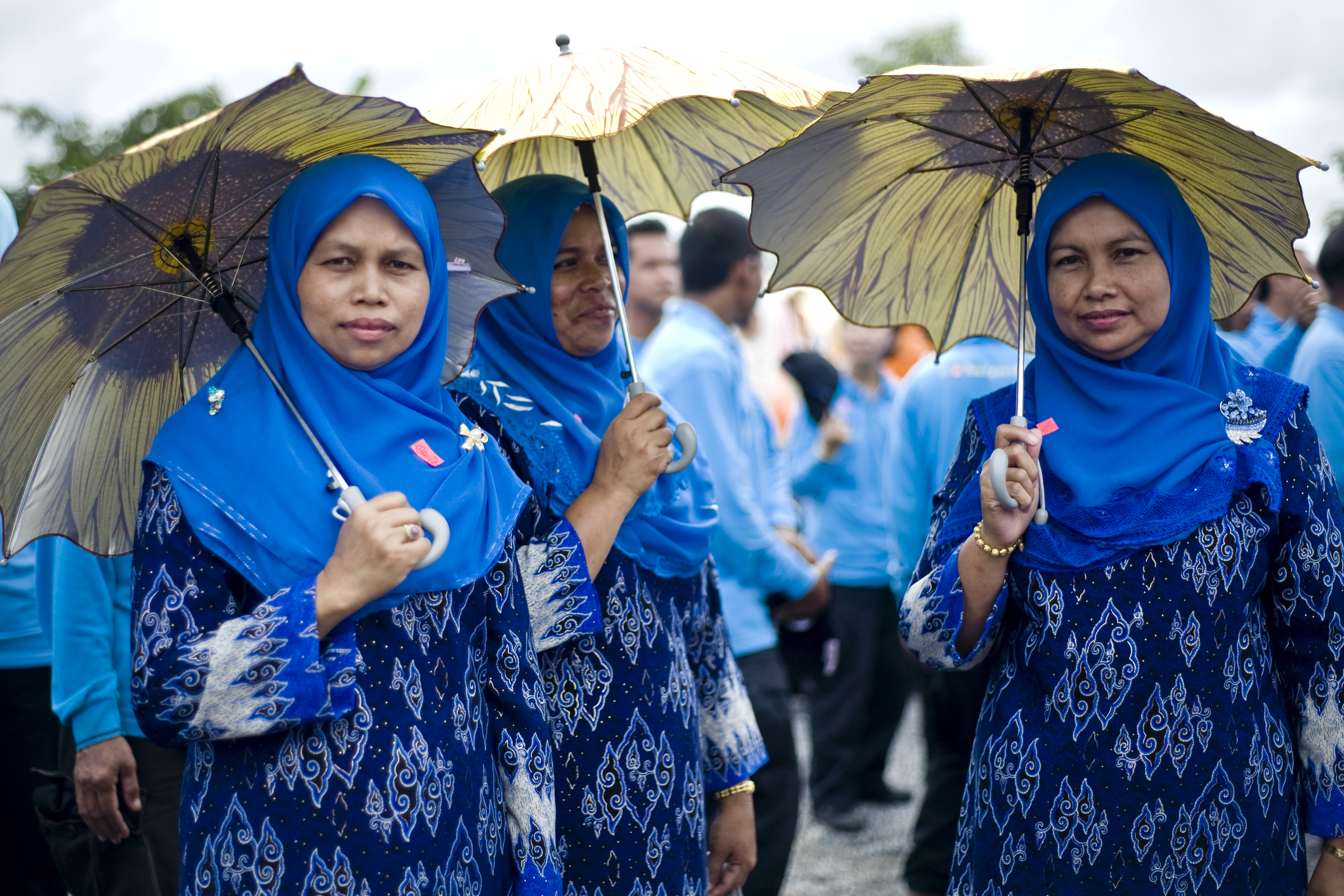
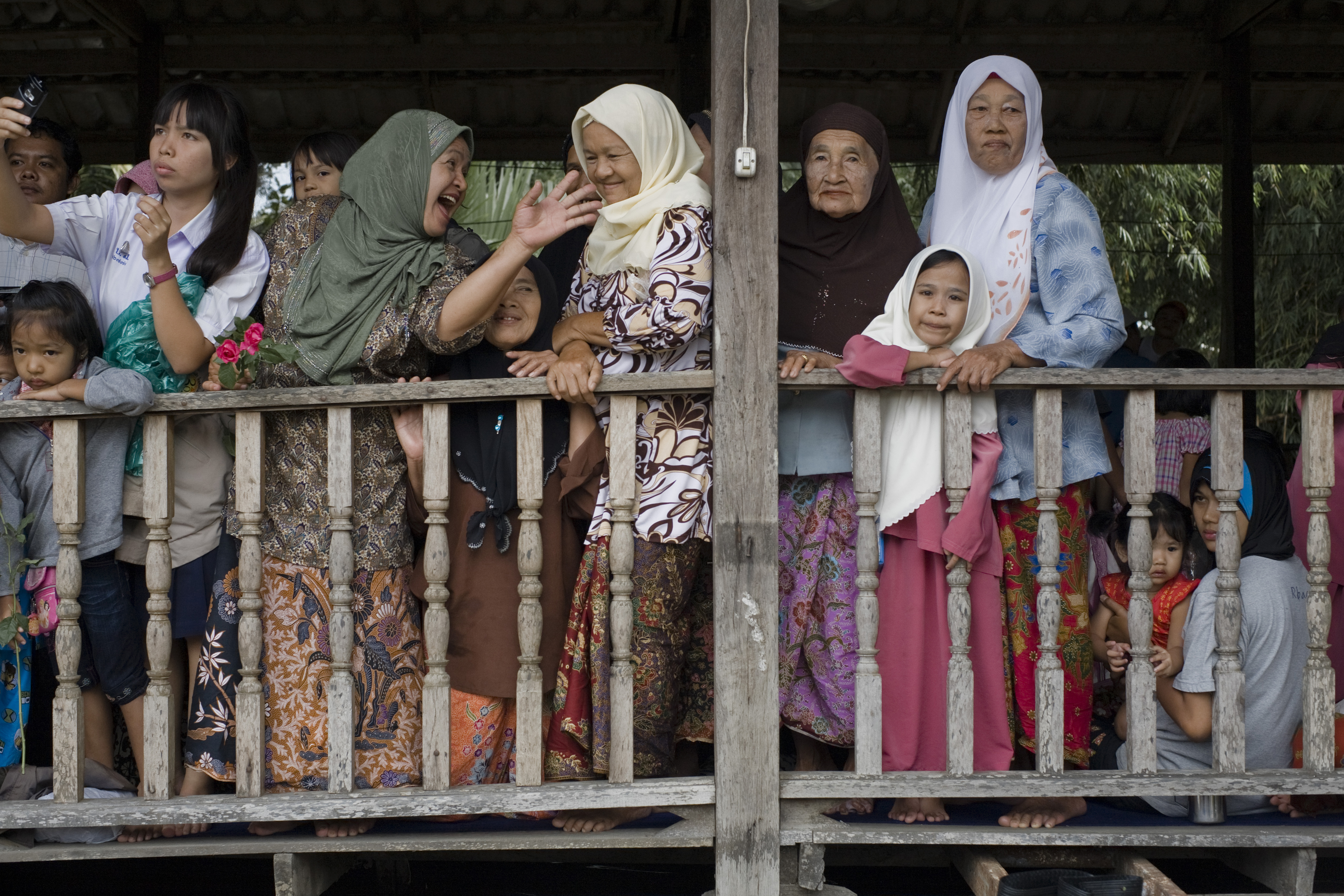
Banong in southern Thailand and neighboring countries

Banong (Thai: บานง Thai pronunciation: [bāː.nōŋ]) or Baju Kurung is a type of blouse traditionally worn by women in the southern border provinces of Thailand, including Pattani, Yala, and Narathiwat. It has a collar and is cut in front, with a folded placket all the way to the hem. The fabric used to make Banong is often thin and sheer, and may be embroidered with patterns on the hem. It is typically worn during religious and cultural events like weddings, funerals, and dance performances. The name Banong comes from the word Bandung in Middle Malay, which refers to a city in the west of the Java Islands, Indonesia. While Banong is popular among Thai Muslims in the southern border provinces, it is also worn by Thai Buddhists and Thai Chinese in the region.

=== Kebaya and Baba Nyonya ===
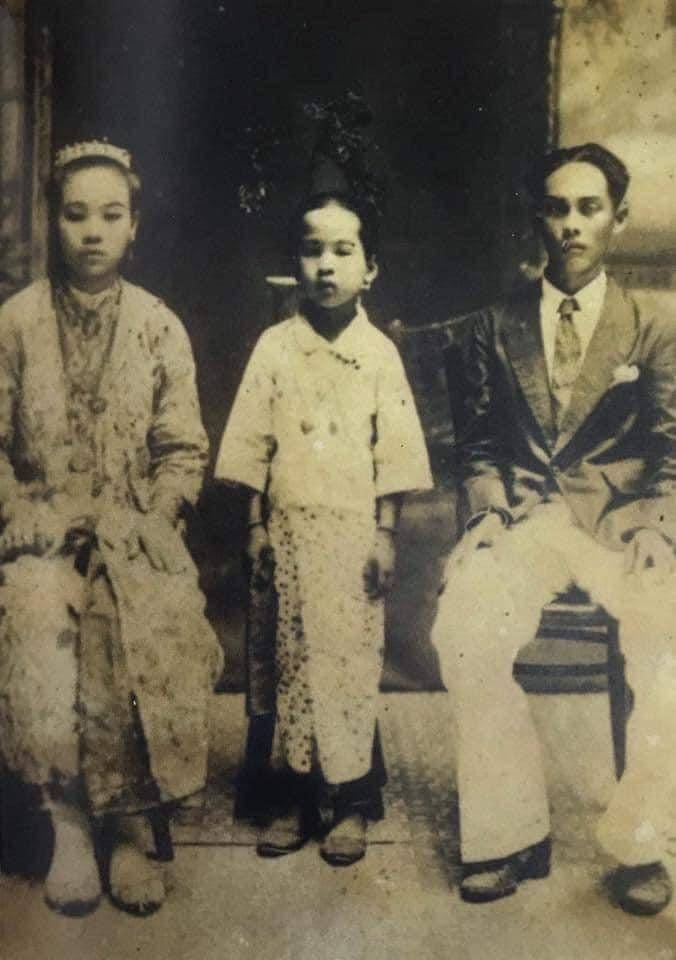
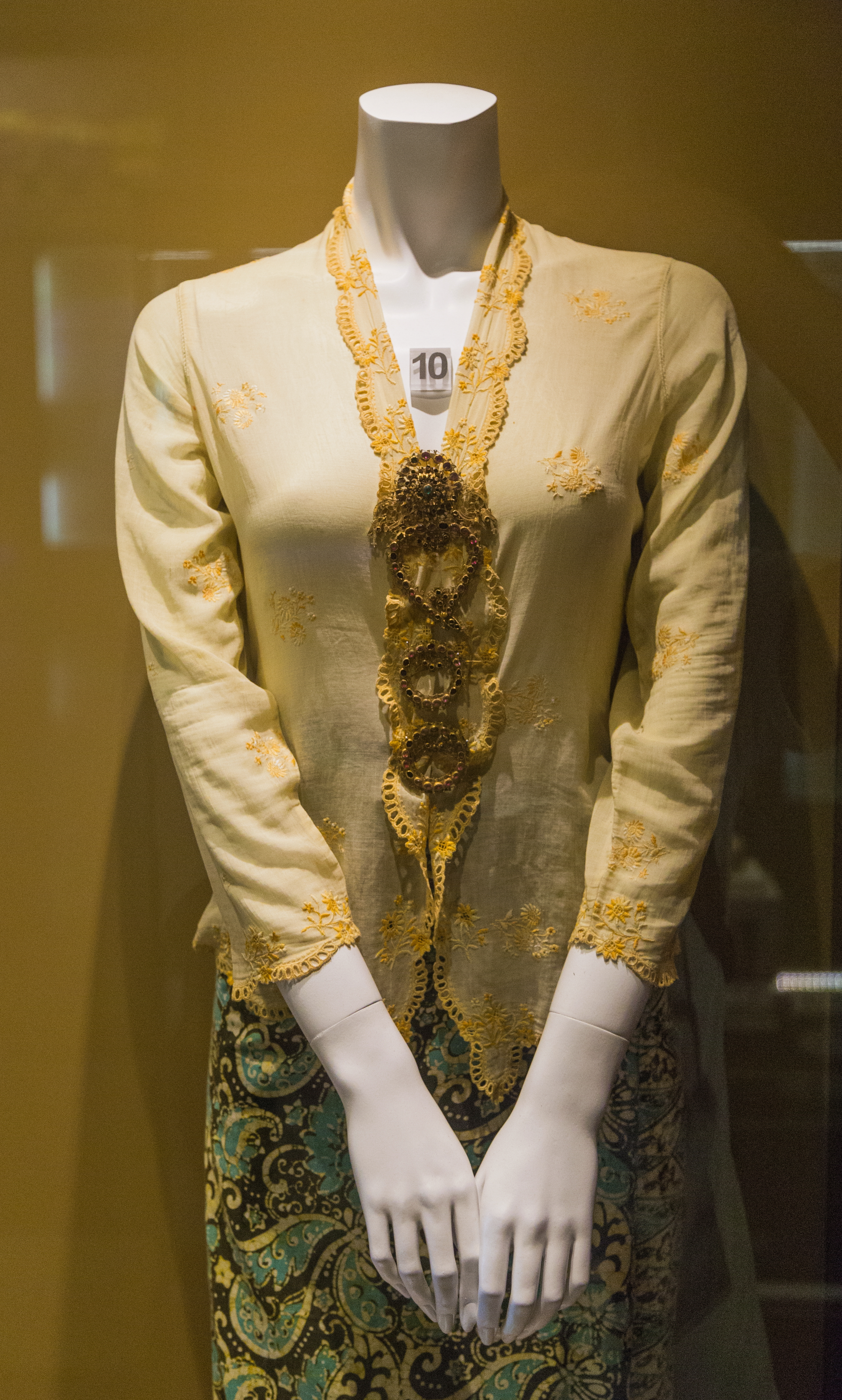
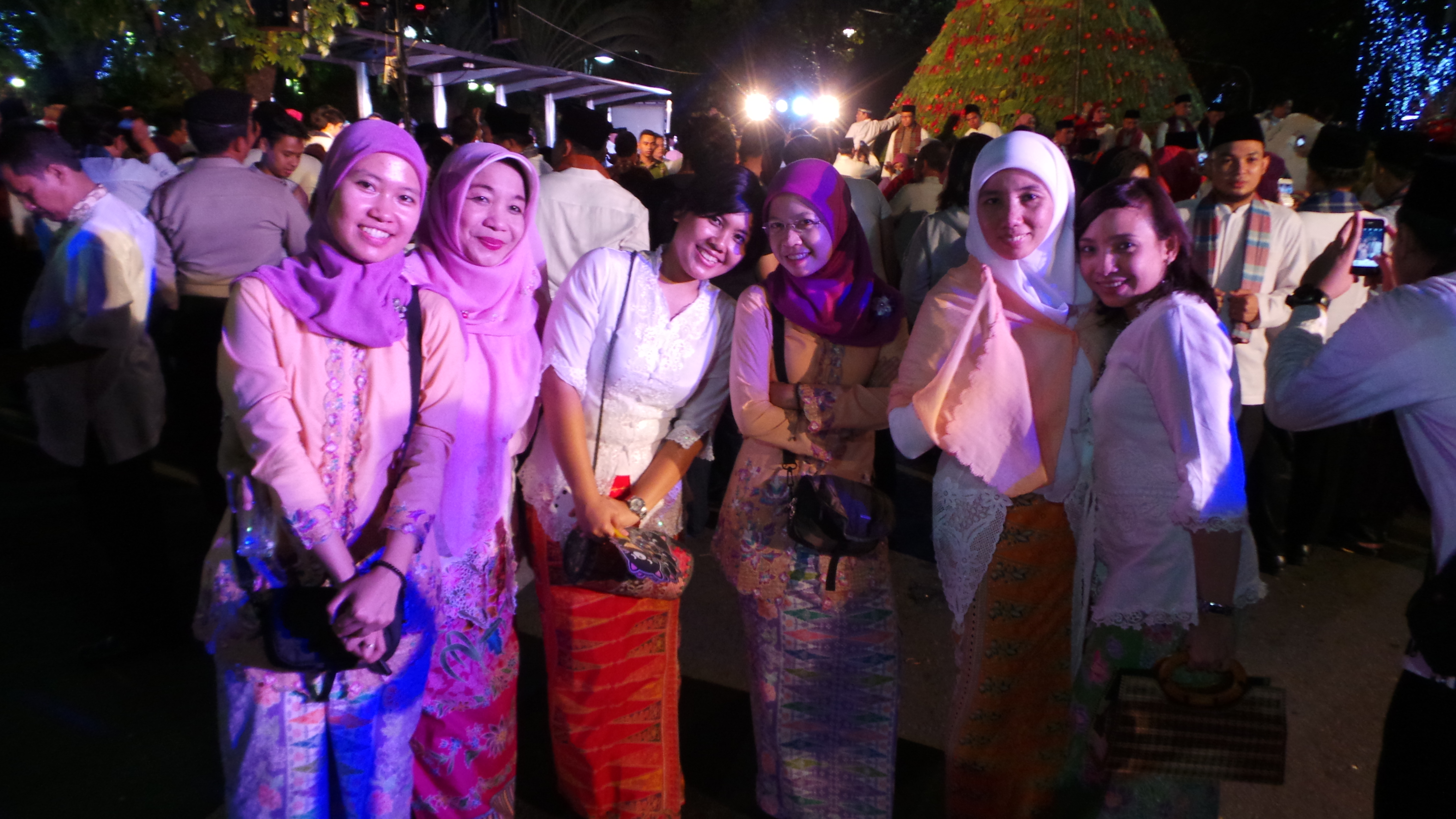
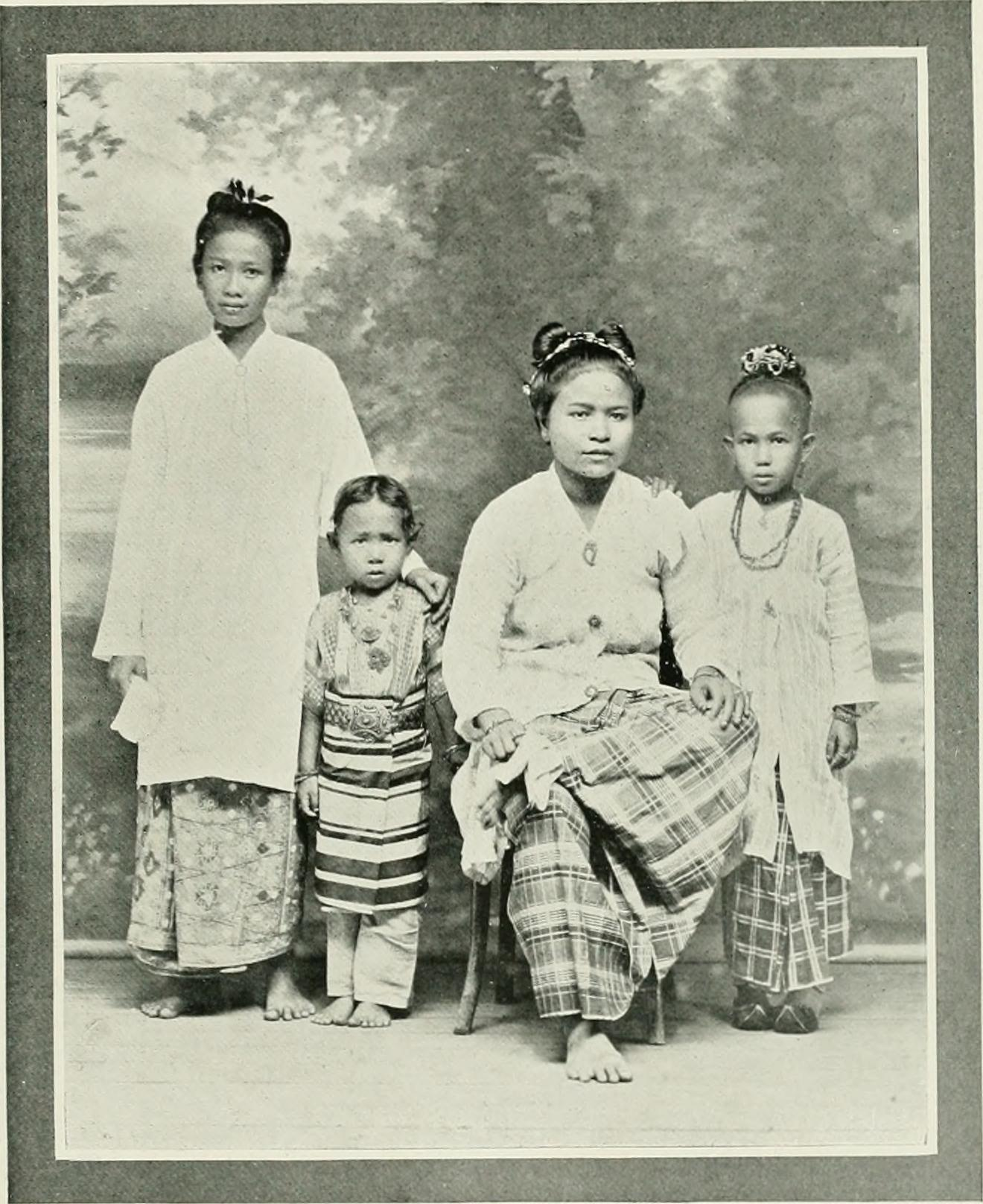
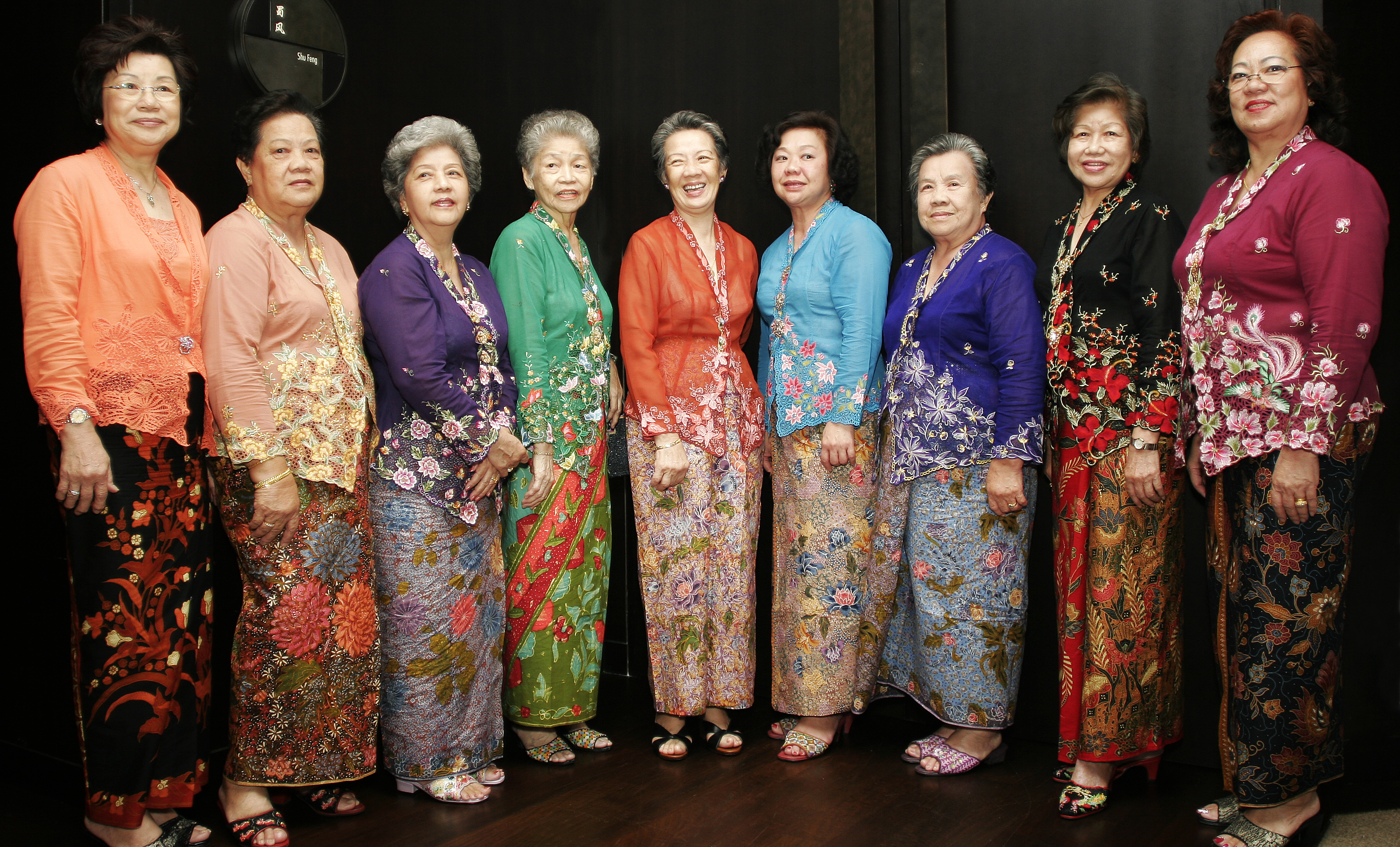
Kebaya in southern Thailand and neighboring countries

Kebaya (Thai: เกอบายา, Thai pronunciation: [kəː.baː.jaː]) and Baba Nyonya (Thai: บาบ๋า-ย๋าหย่า, Thai pronunciation: [baː.bǎː jáː.jàː]) a traditional blouse characterized by its open front and delicate tailoring, commonly made from lightweight fabrics such as silk, cotton, voile, or lace. Decorative elements like embroidery and lacework are often featured, and the blouse is typically fastened with buttons or brooches. It is usually worn with a long lower-body wrap, known as a sarong, kain, or kemben, which is draped and tucked around the waist or under the arms. These wraps may be made from distinctive textiles such as batik, ikat, songket, or tenun.

Recognized as a national costume in Indonesia, the kebaya holds strong cultural associations with Javanese, Sundanese, and Balinese heritage. In neighboring Brunei, Malaysia, and Singapore, it is also regarded as traditional attire, especially among Malay and Peranakan communities. Within these contexts, the complete outfit is often referred to as a "sarong kebaya", with regional variations in design and textile motifs.

In the Southern Thailand, particularly in provinces around the Andaman Sea like Phuket, Krabi, Phang Nga, Ranong, Trang and Satun where are the heart of diversity in culture and practices of Peranakan communities. It is also typically worn by the muslim population in Pattani, Narathiwat and Yala. The kebaya remains part of the cultural identity of the local population. It is worn during festivals, community gatherings, and religious events, serving as a symbol of shared heritage and regional ties between the Southern Thai and the wider cultural sphere.

Today, the kebaya continues to serve not only as traditional dress but also as a symbol of modern Southeast Asian elegance. Its iconic presence is evident in the uniforms of several national airlines, including Singapore Airlines, Malaysia Airlines, Royal Brunei Airlines, and Garuda Indonesia, where stylized versions of the kebaya are worn by female cabin crew.

In a landmark effort to preserve and celebrate regional heritage, Brunei, Indonesia, Malaysia, Singapore, and Thailand submitted a joint nomination in 2023 for the kebaya to be included on the UNESCO Intangible Cultural Heritage Lists. This collaborative recognition underscores the kebaya’s cultural significance across borders and its enduring role in representing Southeast Asian identity.

== Formal costume ==
Queen Sirikit gave royal guidance to consult knowledgeable and experienced individuals, as well as to conduct thorough research using historical sources on the traditional dress of Thai women in the royal court and the clothing of Thai women in the past, from ancient times onward.

Under Sirikit's patronage, various styles of Thai national dress were designed by integrating elements of traditional attire with modern tailoring techniques. This approach created garments that are practical for contemporary wear while preserving their distinctly Thai elegance, harmony, and grace. These designs have left a lasting impression on those who have encountered them.

Vogue featured her portrait in its July 1982 issue. This international exposure significantly enhanced the global recognition of Thai textiles, contributing to their widespread popularity both domestically and abroad. Subsequently, Sirikit granted permission for the publication of a pictorial book titled Ying Thai (Thai Women) that aimed to disseminate the royal-endorsed styles of Thai national dress. Initially, five designs were created under her royal patronage. Following their widespread popularity, three additional styles were later developed.

- The Ruean Ton style is versatile and suitable for various occasions, particularly informal gatherings.
- The Chitralada style is intended for daytime ceremonies and is considered more formal than Ruean Ton.
- Dusit styles are designated as full formal attire, typically worn with ceremonial sashes at royal functions requiring full dress.

Meanwhile, the Chakri style is commonly worn for evening occasions, weddings, or semi-formal receptions in warmer climates; it is characterized by a shoulder-baring sabai drape.

The Siwalai style, historically associated with noblewomen, is often worn for evening events, banquets, wedding celebrations, or full ceremonial occasions. It is particularly suitable for cooler weather due to its layered construction.

Sirikit promoted all eight styles as standard forms of Thai national dress, making them accessible to the general public. These styles have since been widely adapted and have become recognized as Thailand's national costume up to the present day.

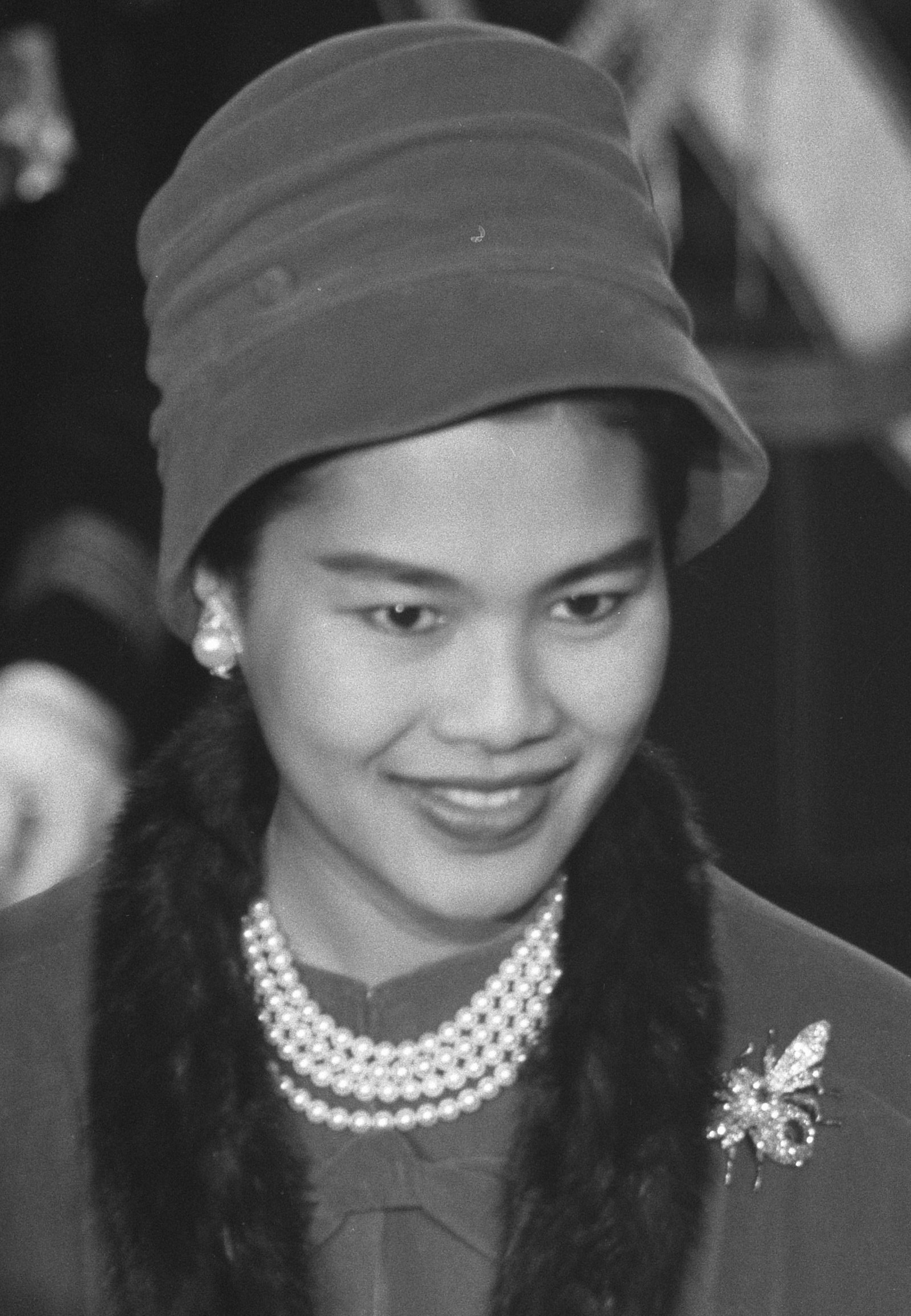
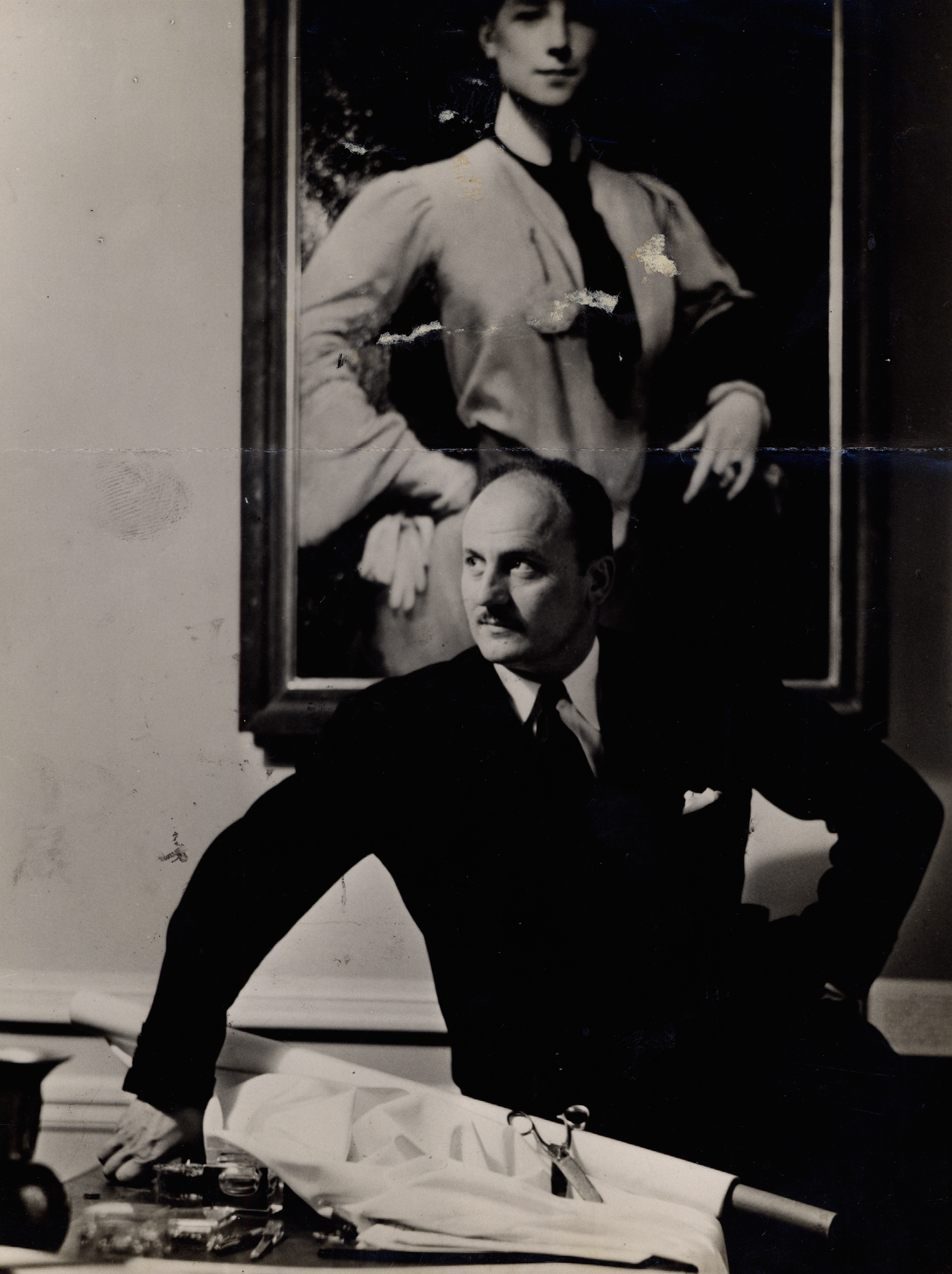
Queen Sirikit and Pierre Balmain in the 1950s - 1960s

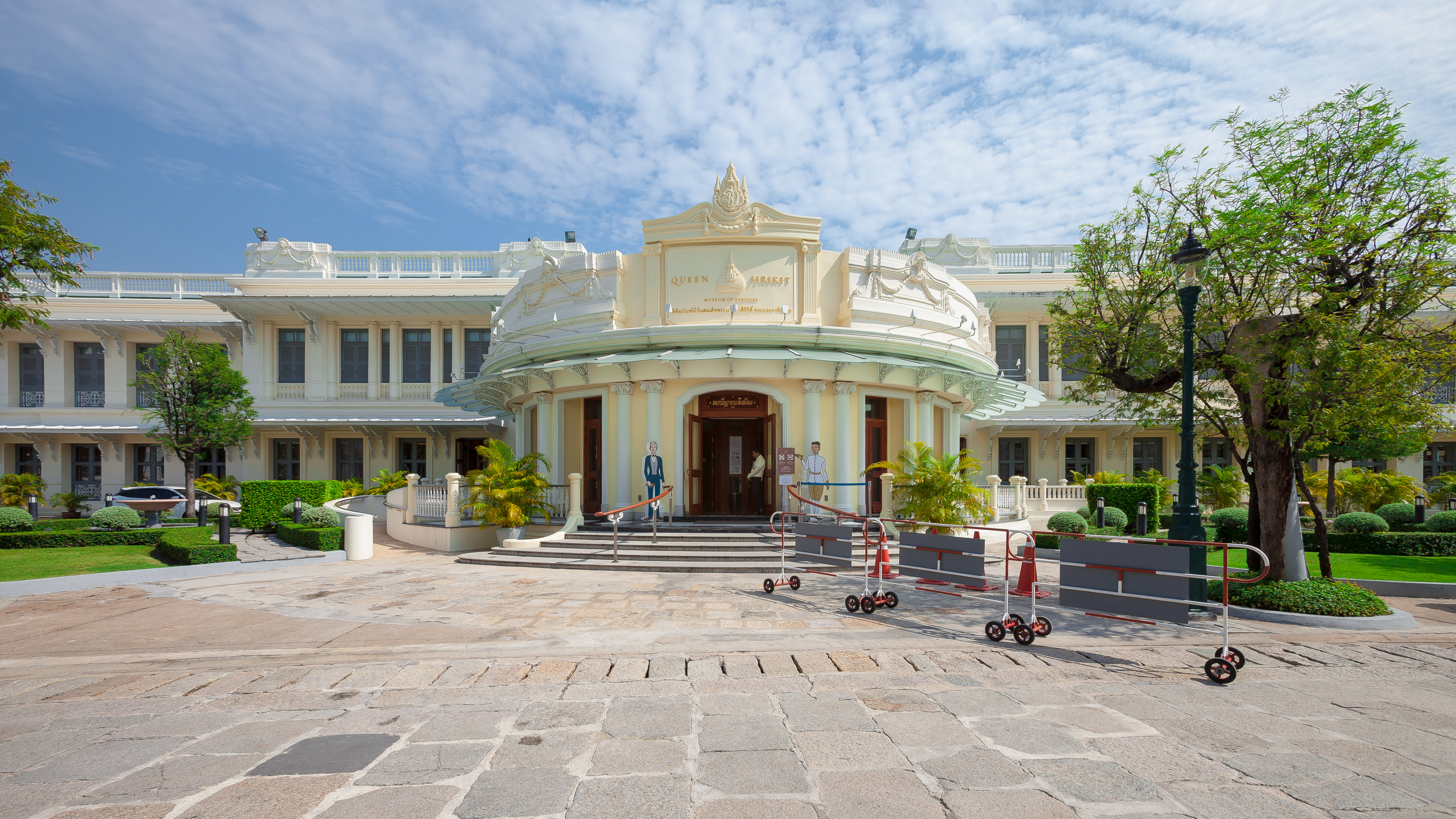
Queen Sirikit Museum of Textiles in the Grand Palace

== Court uniform and dress ==
Thai court uniform and dress originate from the Sukhothai Kingdom and later the Ayutthaya Kingdom. These were worn by those in attendance at the royal court up until the mid-20th century and some are still worn as formal dress by certain office-holders and nobility. These have distinct styles with influences from India, the Khmer Empire, Dvaravati and China. Silk was brought to Siam via trade routes. The Panung is a foundational garment. It has intricate weaving and embroidery which indicates the wearer's status. During the Ayutthaya era the royal attire became more elaborate and ceremonial. There were strict dress codes for various occasions with specific designs and accessories. The clothing was often made from gold- and silver-threaded fabrics. The Chong kraben was worn with embroidered jackets. Women's outfits have more intricate patterns often with golden belts, brooches and necklaces to reflect the prosperity and sophistication of the Ayutthaya Court.

The Rattanakosin era royal fashion was further refined to distinguish from casual attire. Men's attire became more structured, influenced by Western tailoring techniques which were brought by European visitors. The Chong Kraben was styled and paired with fitted jackets and shirts. Royal garments for women became more lavish with yok dok fabrics, floral motifs, and ornate phaa biang shoulder cloths. Crowns, earrings, and golden bracelets enhanced the regal appearance. Queen Sirikit worked closely with artistans to revive Thai royal attire and preserve Thai cultural heritage by recreating historical designs and adept them for modern use. They created the Chut Thai Phra Ratchaniyom, a collection of eight official Thai clothing styles. These are for various occasions such as royal ceremonies and galas. The most iconic styles are the Chut Thai Chakkraphat, a majestic outfit inspired by ancient royal attire, and the Chut Thai Siwalai, a sophisticated ensemble for formal events.

The fabrics are often woven by hand with traditional weaving and embroidery techniques. The weaving and embroidery techniques are preserved. The patterns are for example mythical creatures, lotus flowers, geometrical shapes each carrying its own symbolism and spirituality. Hues have auspicious qualities. Gold and silver threads are commonly used to highlight the grandeur of the garments, while jewelry such as crowns, belts, and necklaces add a finishing touch of regality.

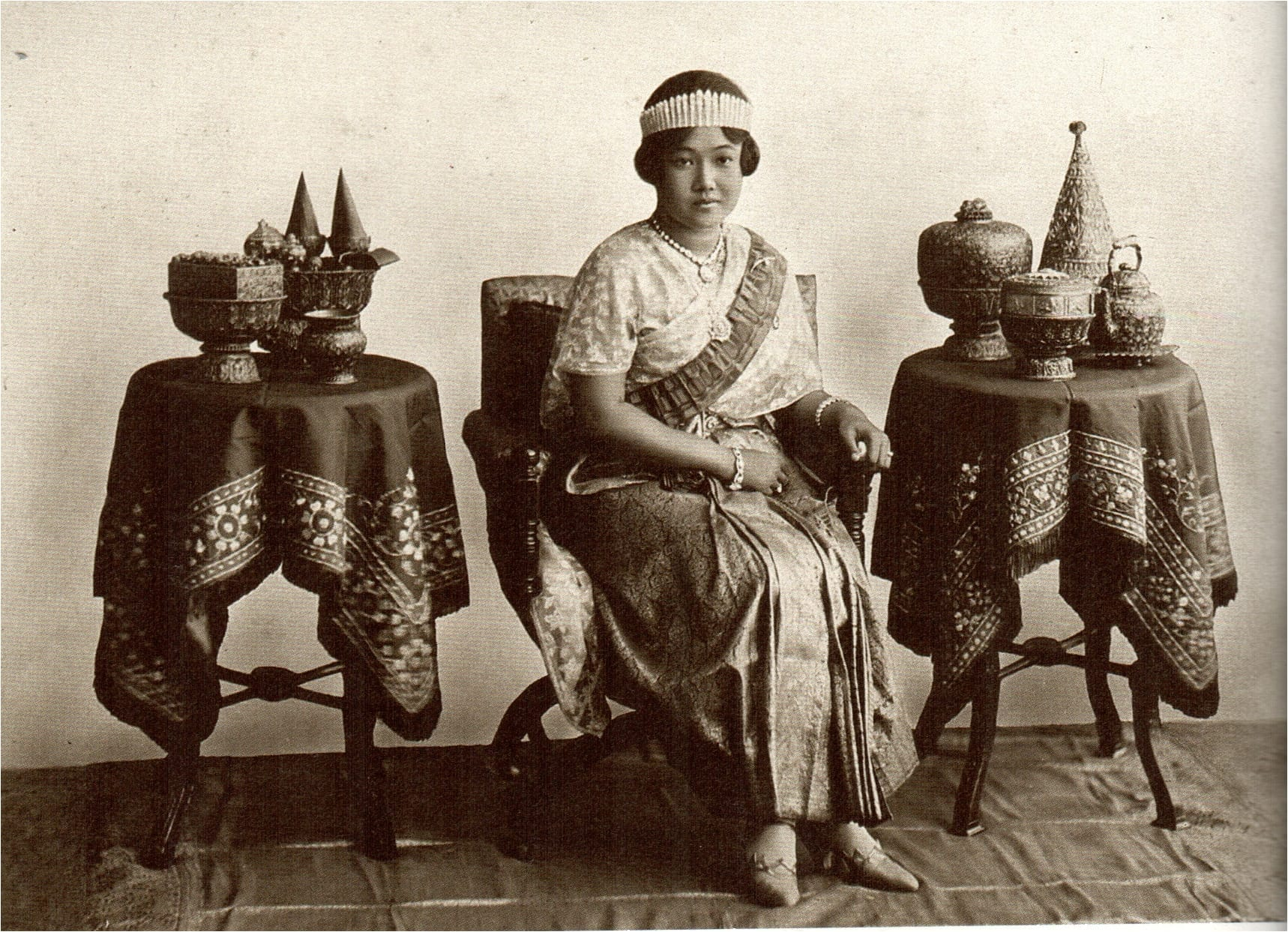
The coronation dress of Queen Rambai Barni of Siam, 1925

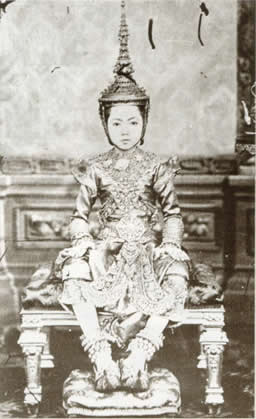
Princess Voralaksanavadi in full regalia on her tonsurate ceremony in 1880

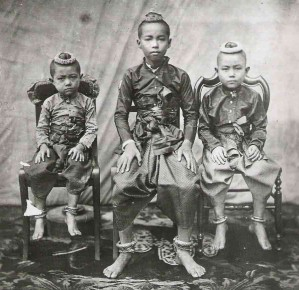
Photograph of Prince Chulalongkorn and his two younger brothers wearing chong kraben, 1851

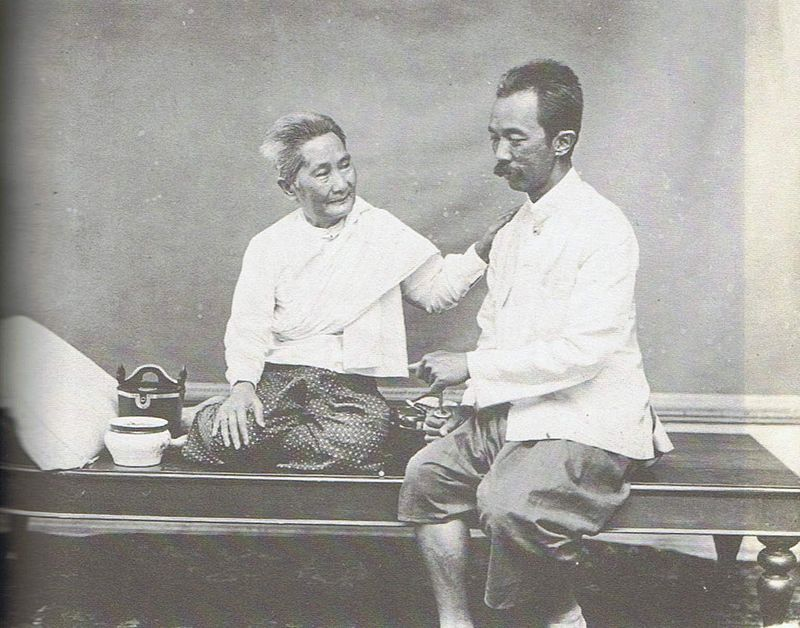
Prince Damrong Rajanubhab wearing raj pattern and his mother wearing panung and pha biang, 1912

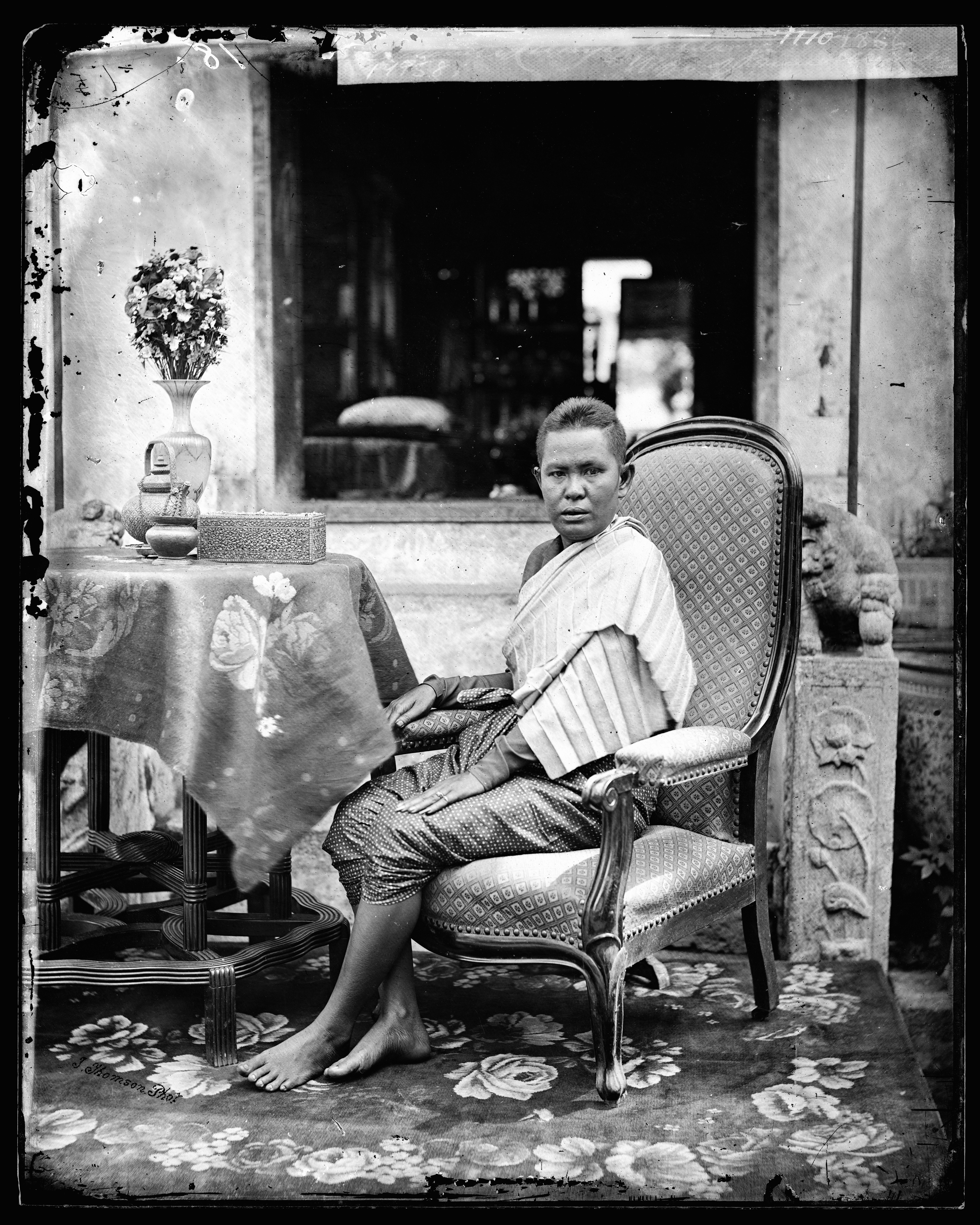
Lady Pun Bunnag, Somdet Chao Phraya Borom Maha Sri Suriwongse's wife wearing pha biang, 1866

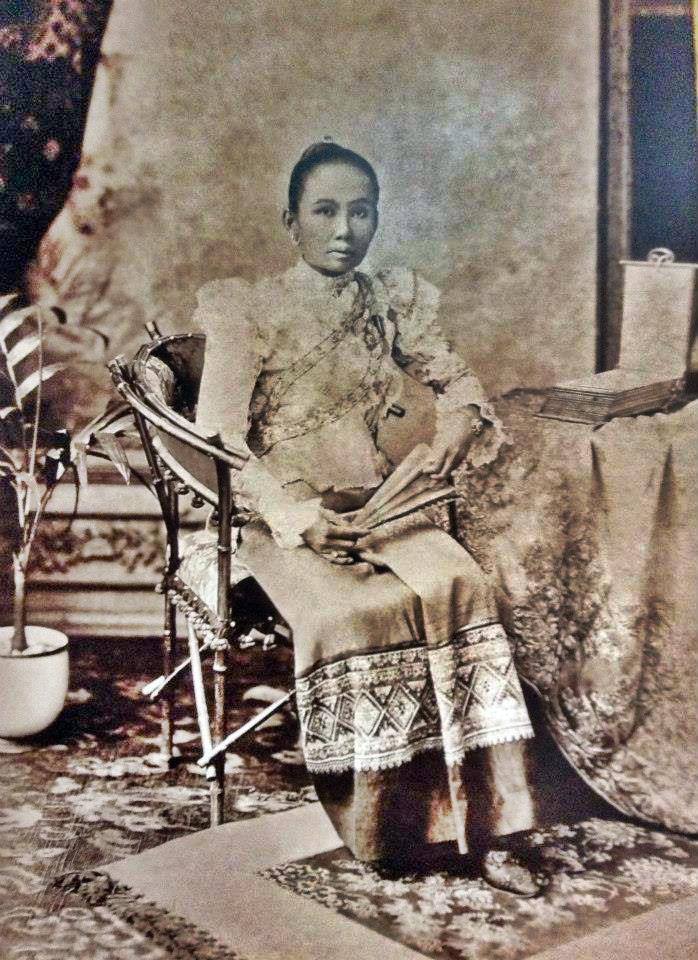
Bualai, was a Princess Consort of Phiriya Thepphawong of Phrae wearing ham sleeve blouses and sin, before 1902

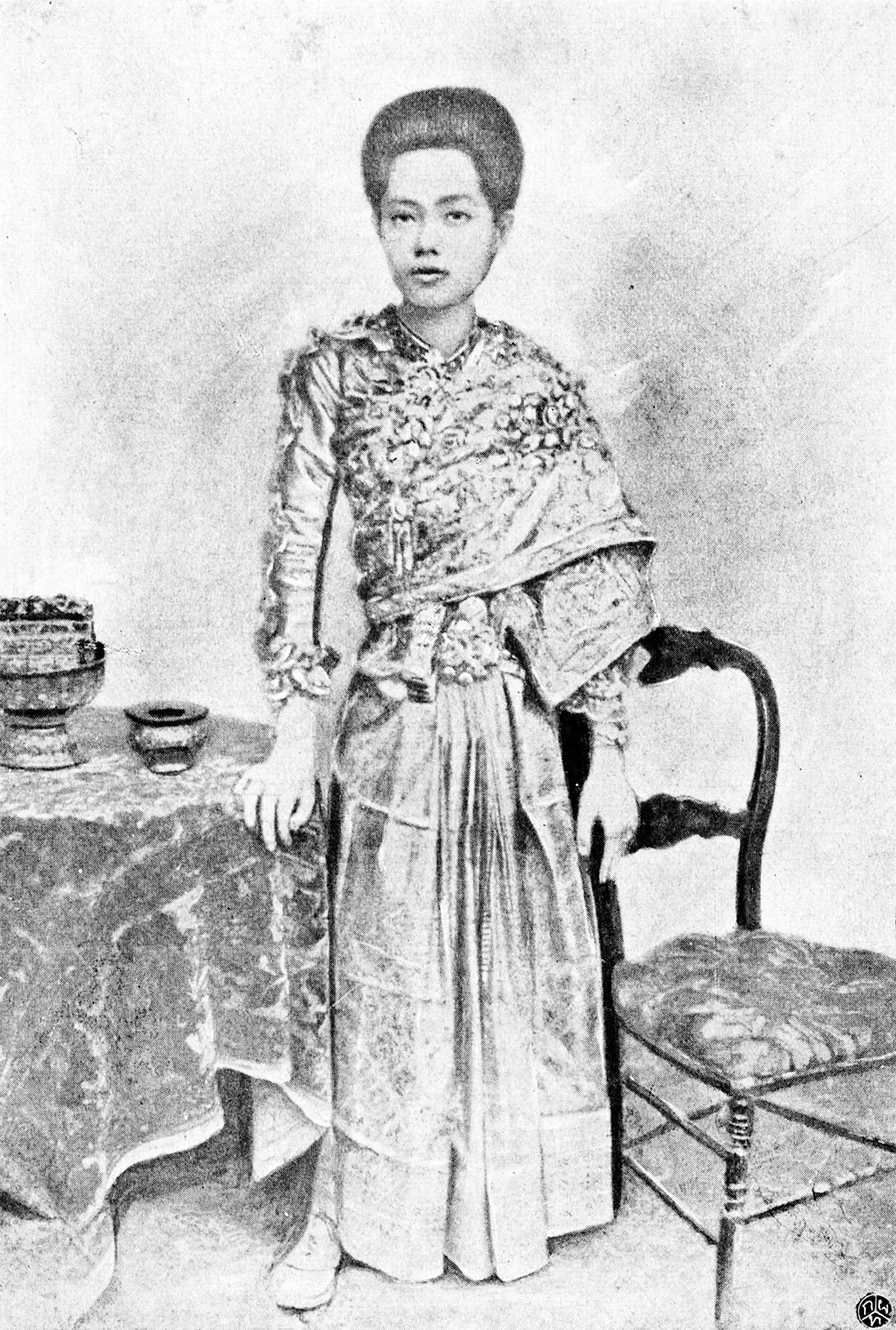
Princess Voralaksanavadi, a daughter of King Chulalongkorn (Rama V) wearing panung and pha biang, 1926

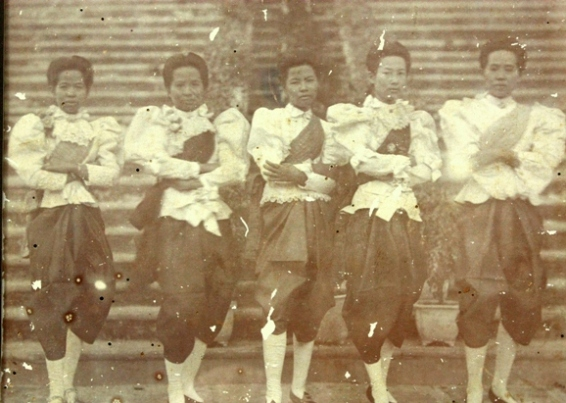
Thai princess of the Inner Court of the Grand Palace, Bangkok in 1890

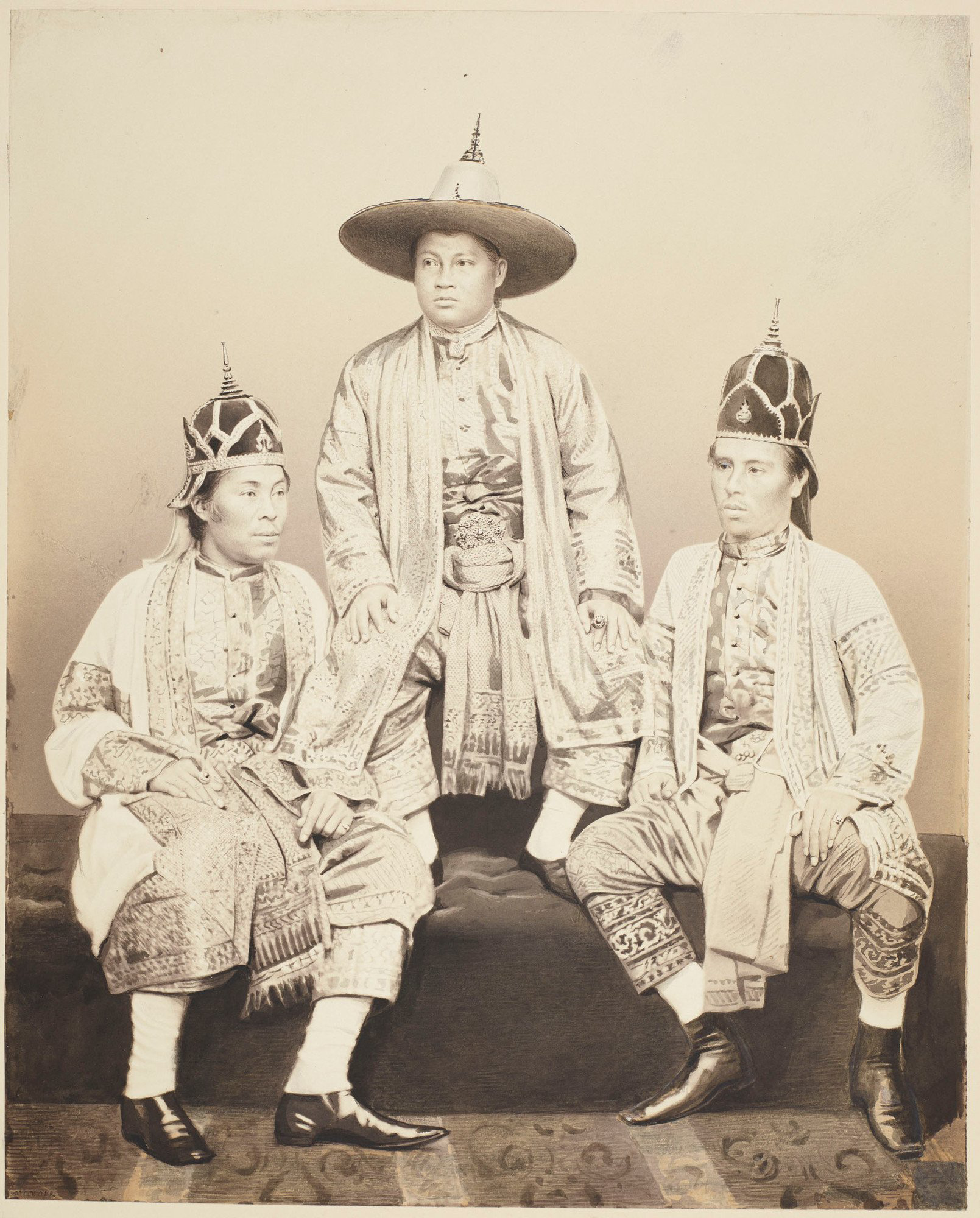
Siamese Ambassadors in England 1857

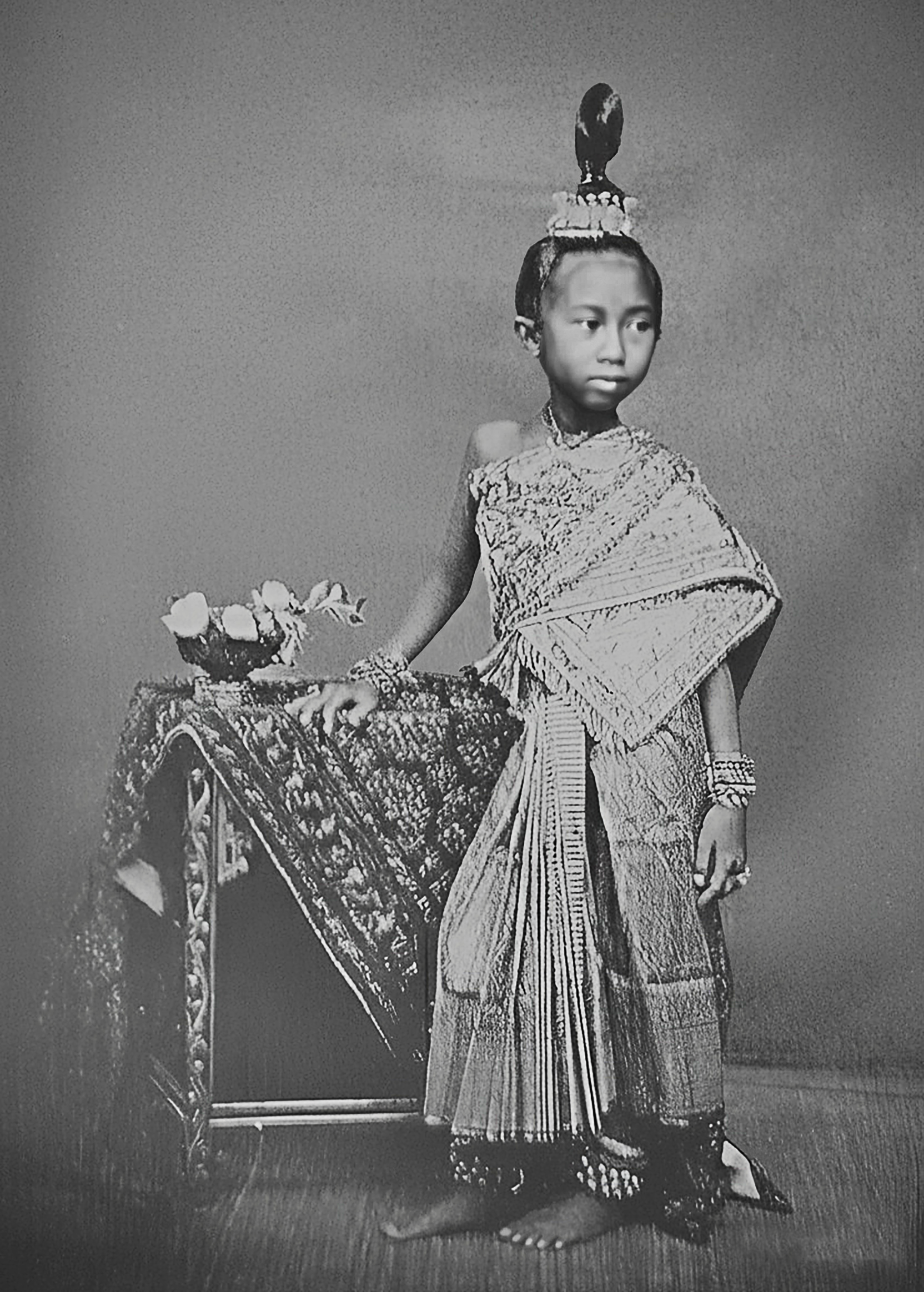
Young Princess Phunphitsamai Ditsakun

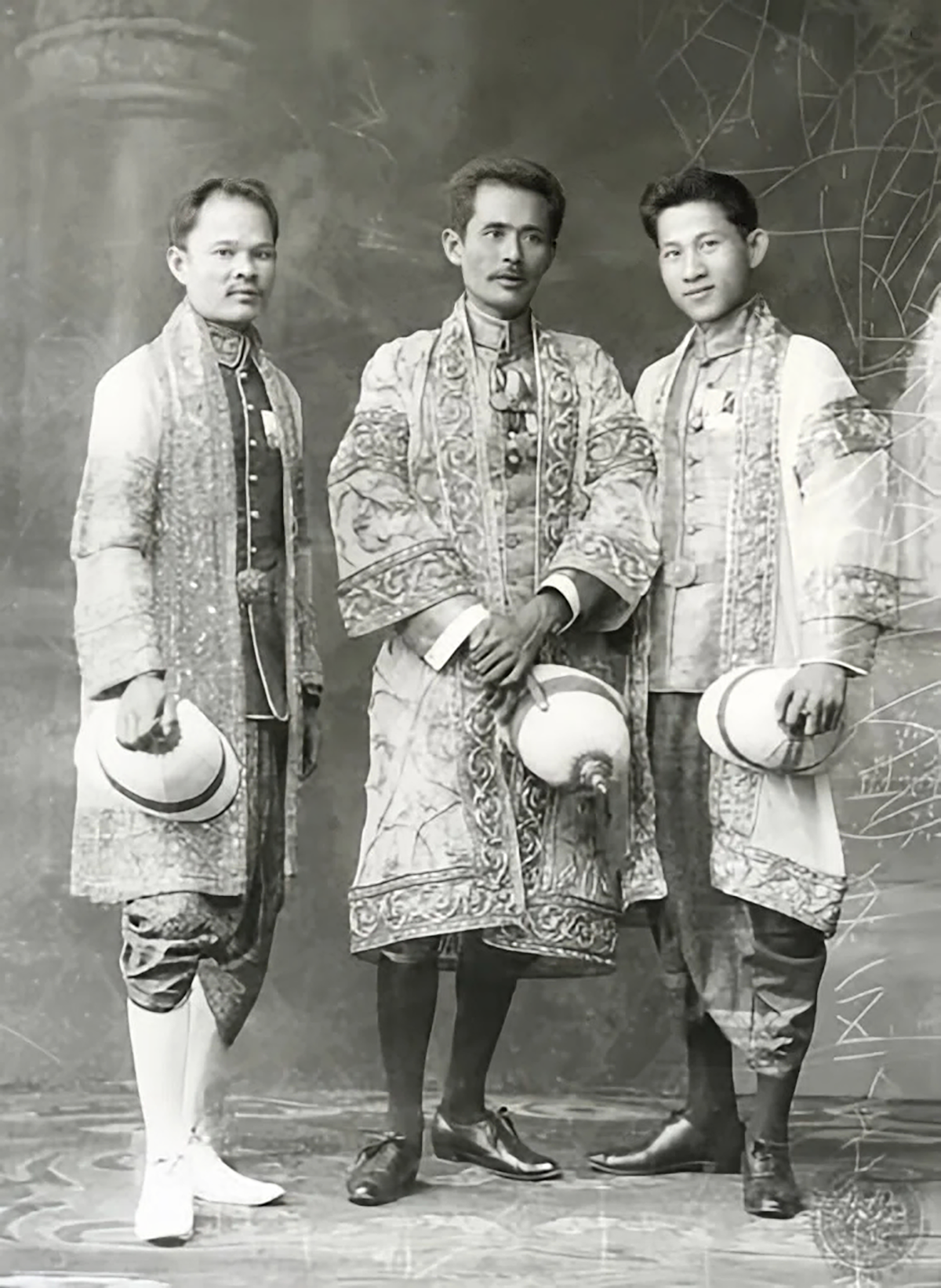
Three Thai noblemen in Siamese Royal Court attire

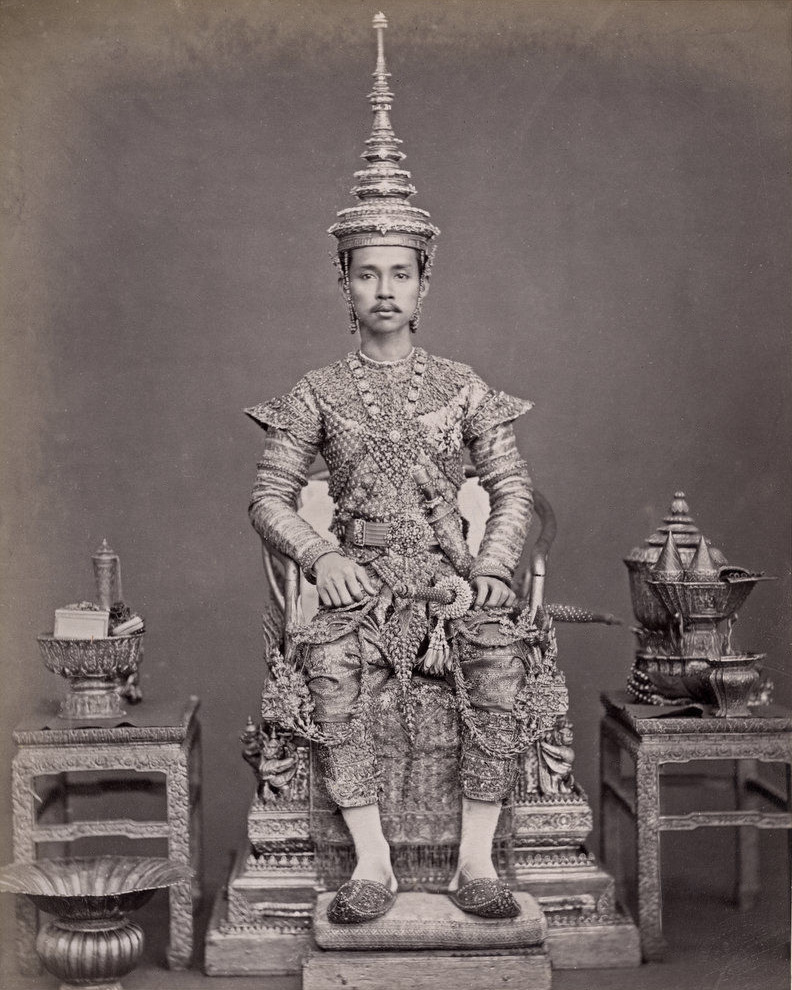
King Chulalongkorn sits on his throne dressed in his coronation robes, Siam, c. 1880.

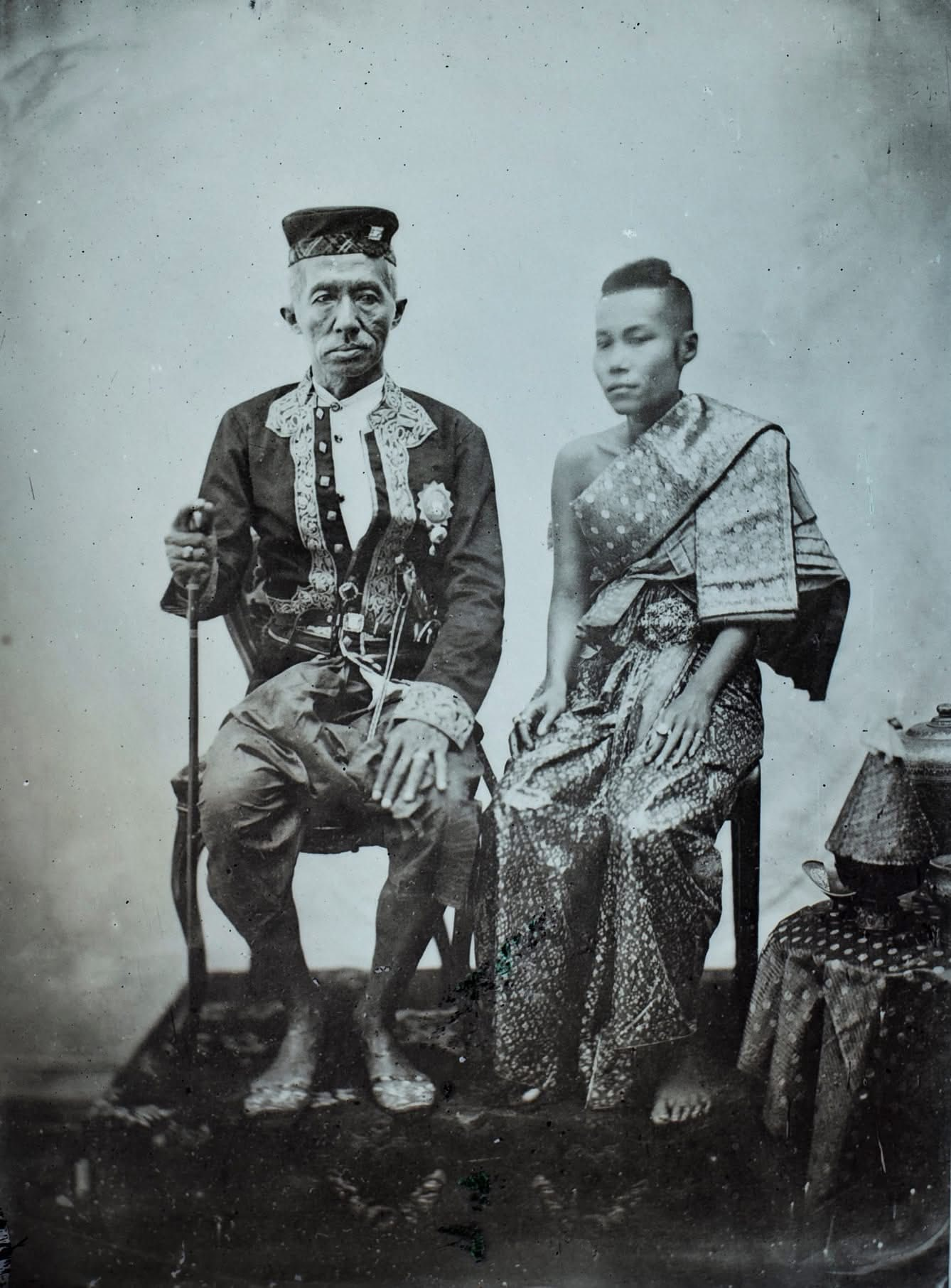
Portrait of King Mongkut (Rama IV) with his wife Queen Debsirindra of Thailand 1862-1867

== Accessories ==
=== Lomphok ===
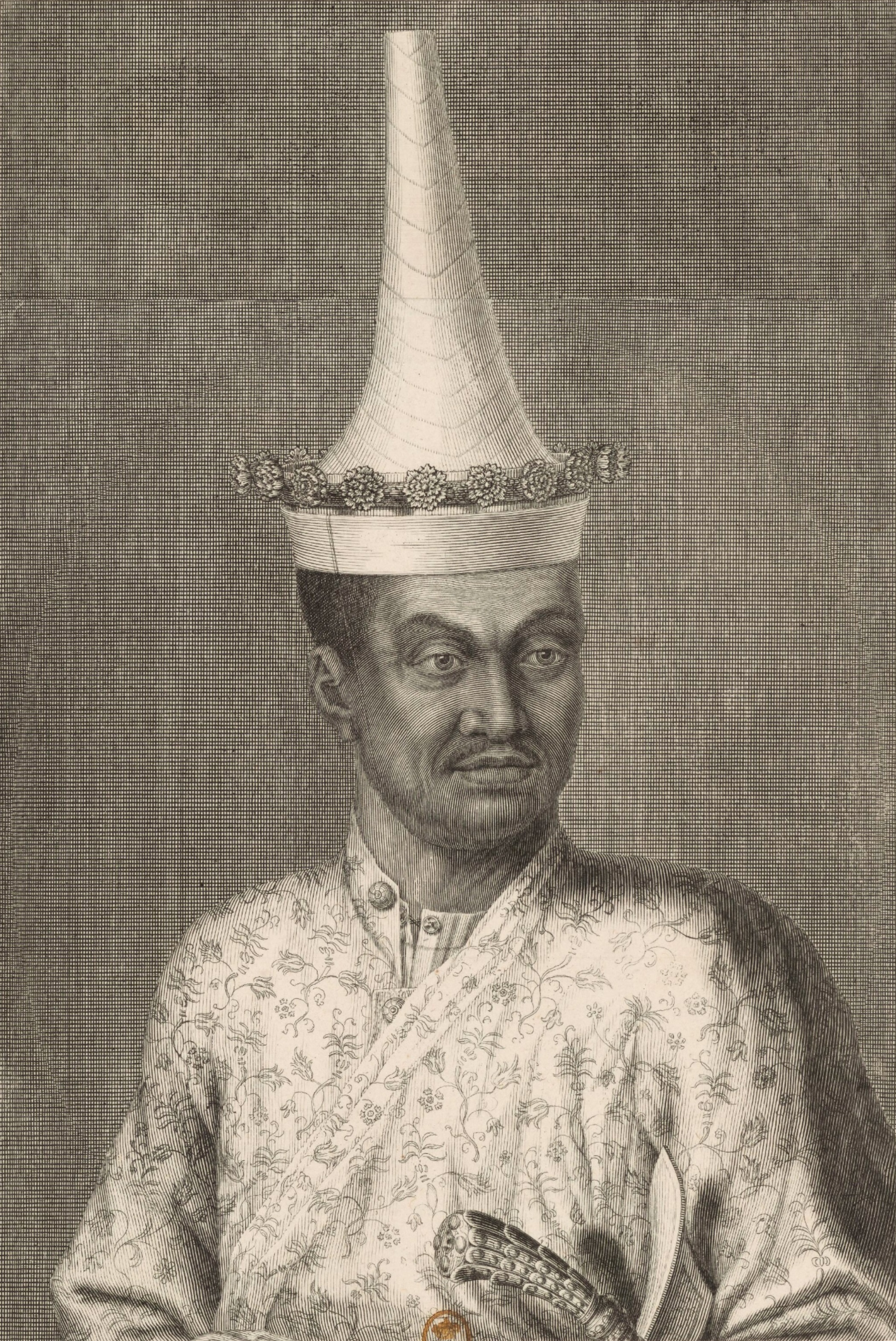
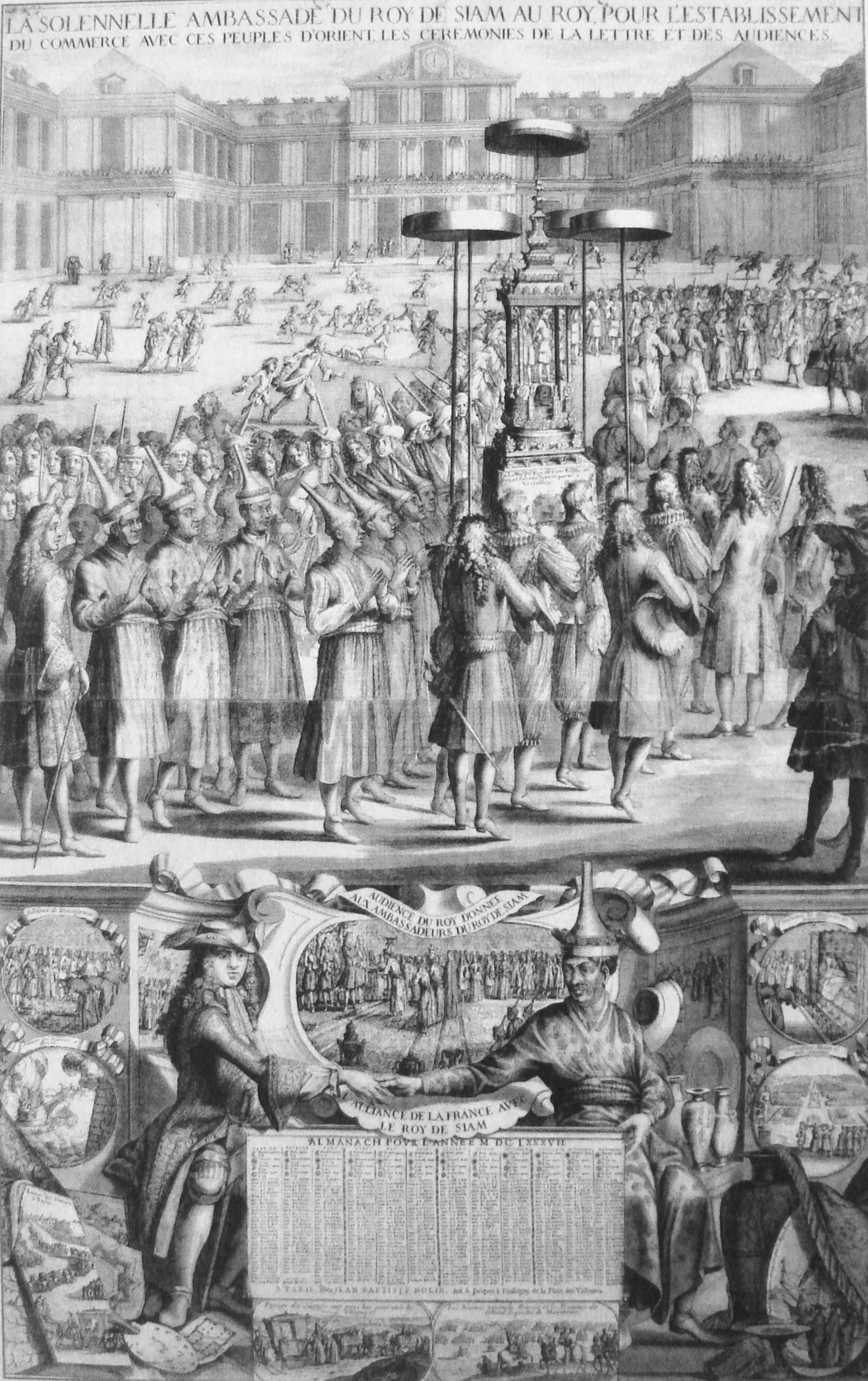
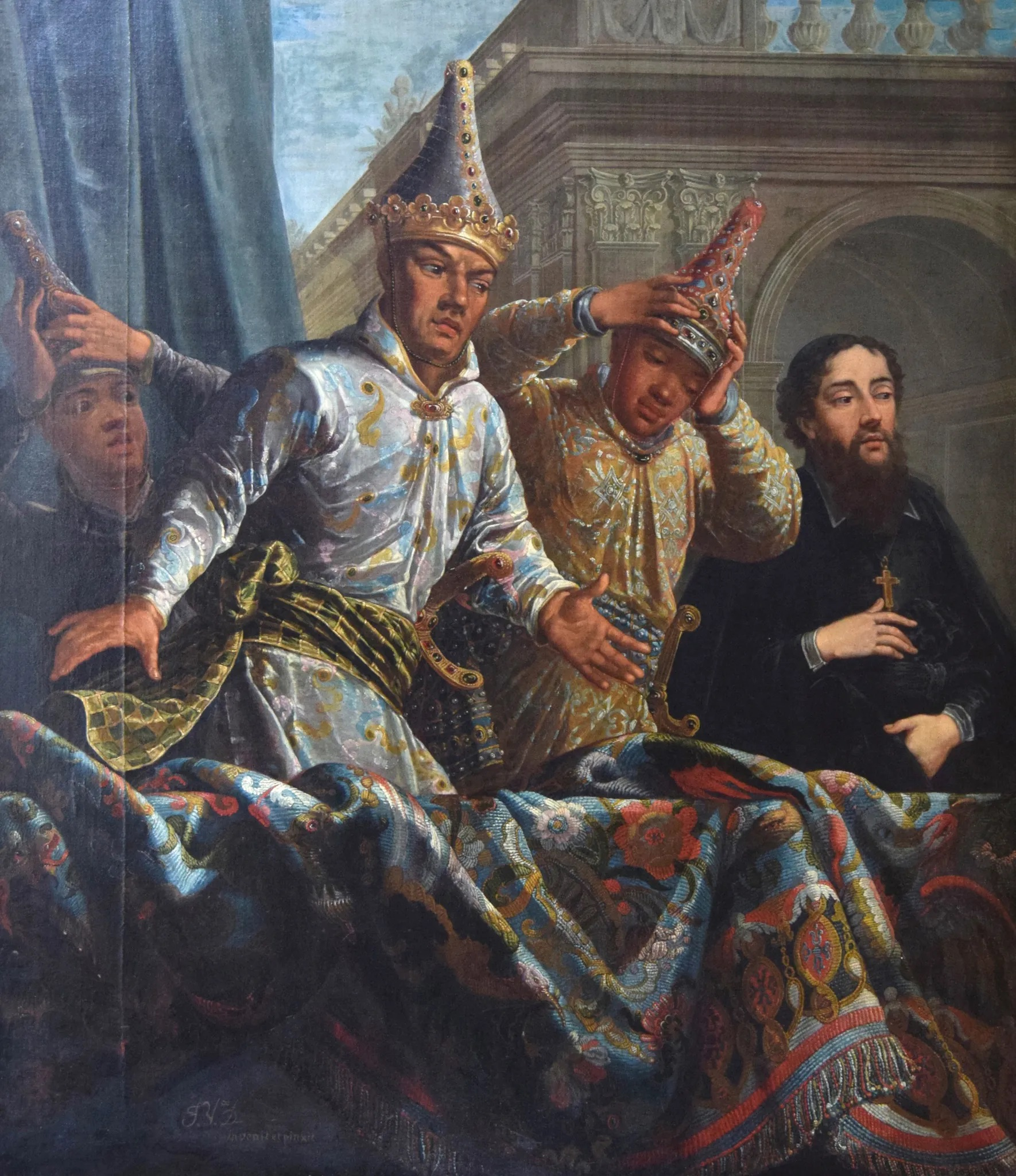
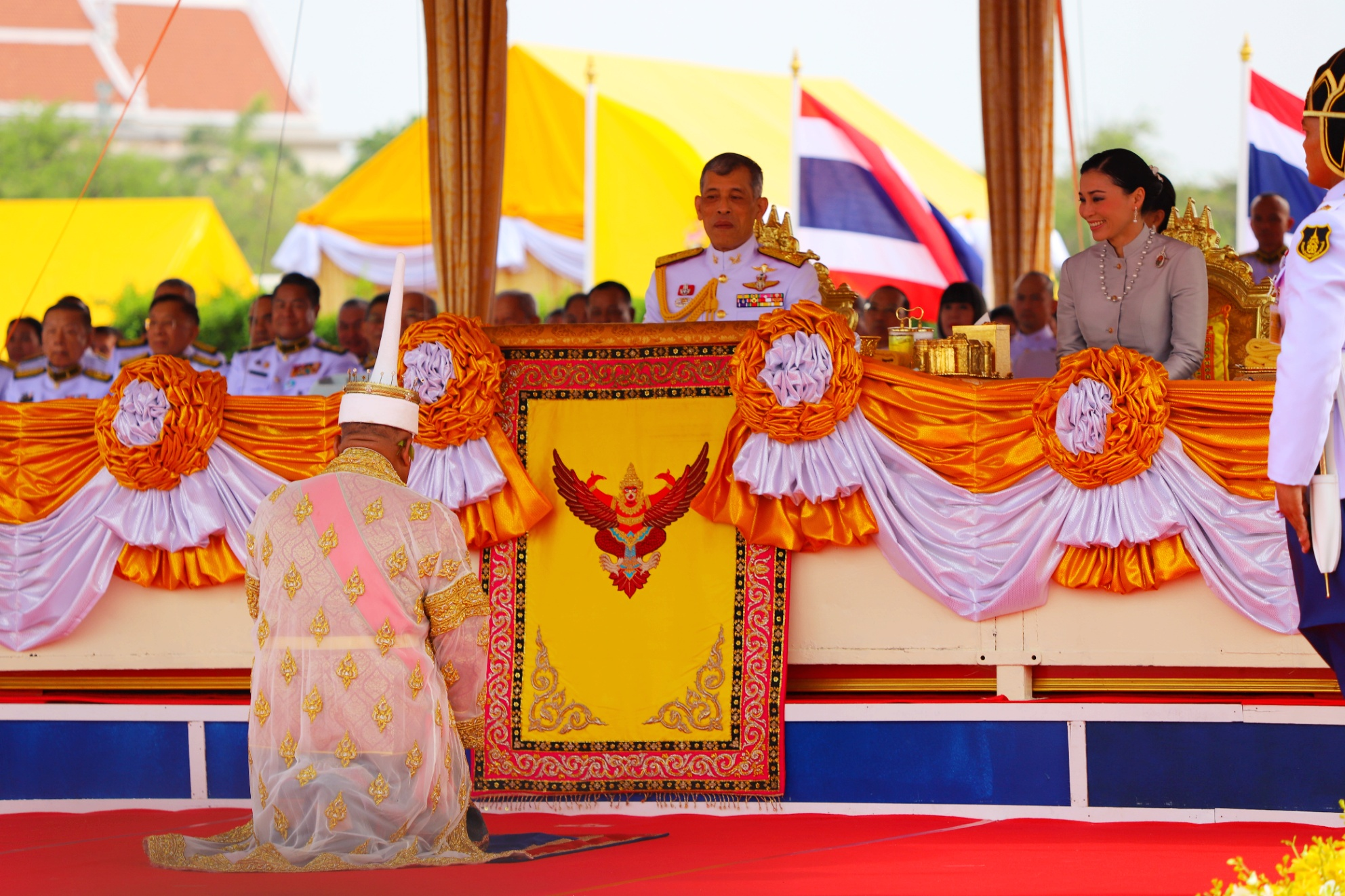
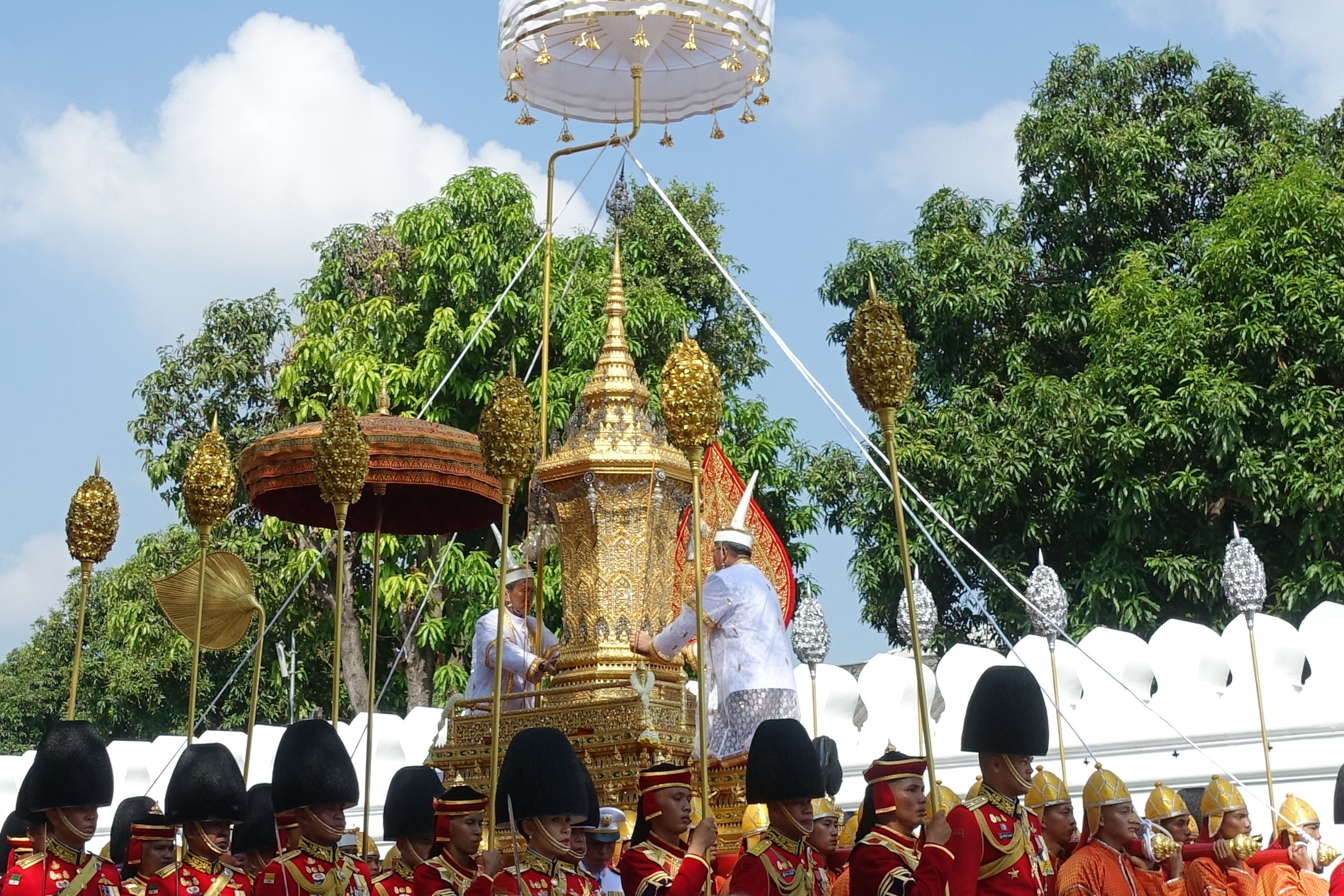
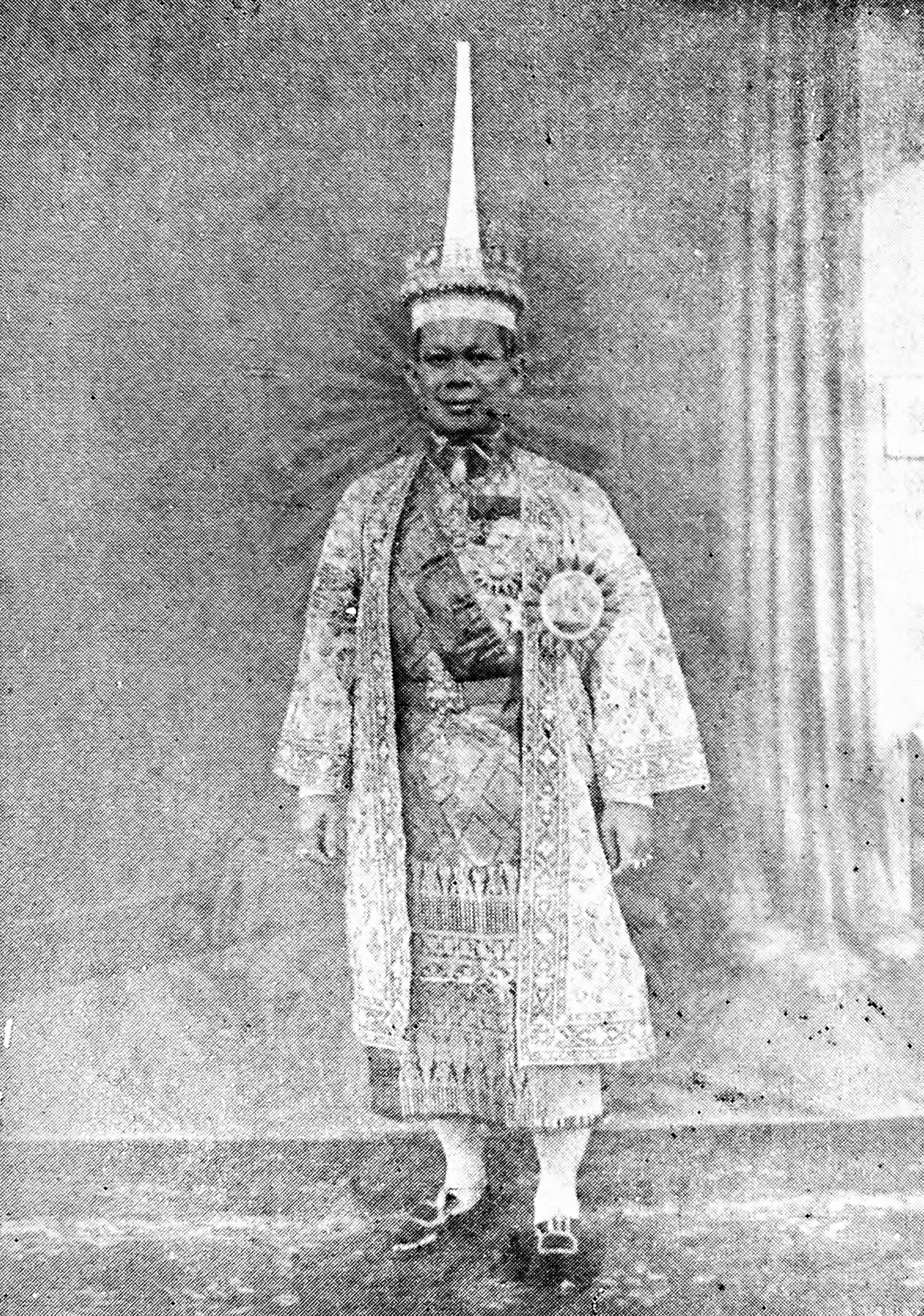
Siamese people worn lomphok during different social and ceremonial occasions throughout Thai history

Lomphok (Thai: ลอมพอก, pronounced [lɔ̄m.pʰɔ̂ːk]; literally, "piled up [and] layered [wrapped head cover]") is a ceremonial headgear of Thailand, historically worn by royalty and nobility. It is a tall pointed hat, made of white cloth wrapped around a bamboo frame. The lomphok is believed to have been adapted from the turbans of Safavid dynasty Persia during the Ayutthaya period, and its use is extensively documented by European writers who came into contact with Siam during the reign of King Narai. In particular, its use by Kosa Pan and the other diplomats of the embassy to the court of Louis XIV in 1686 became a sensation in French society. Today, the lomphok can be seen worn by officials in the Royal Ploughing Ceremony and royal funeral processions.

== Gallery ==
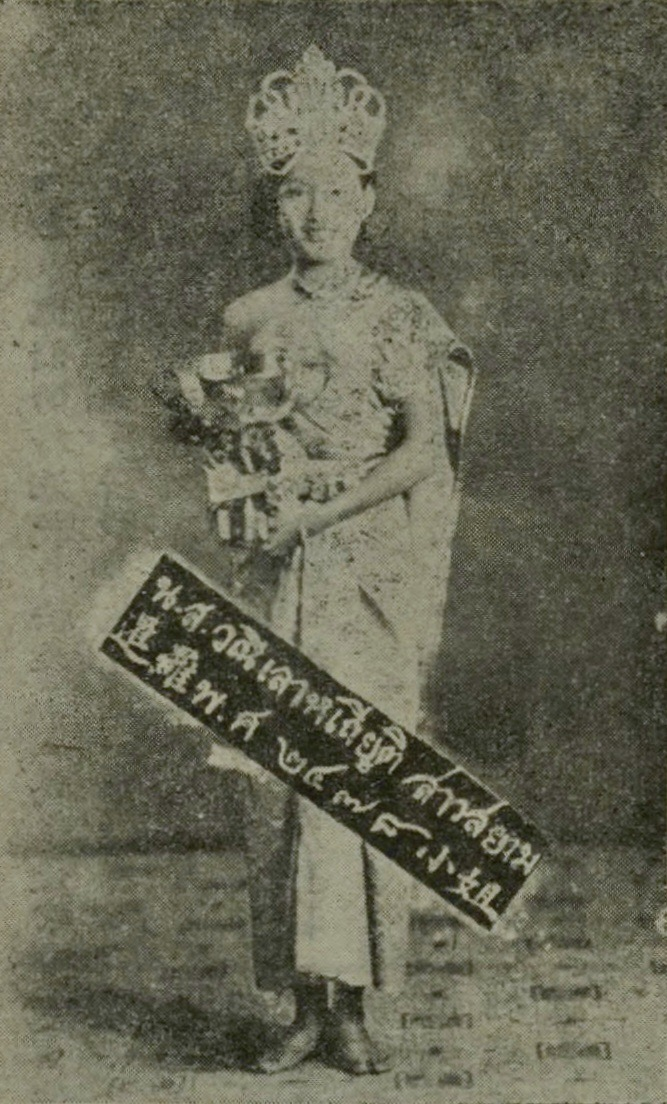
Wani Laohakiat, Miss Siam 1935

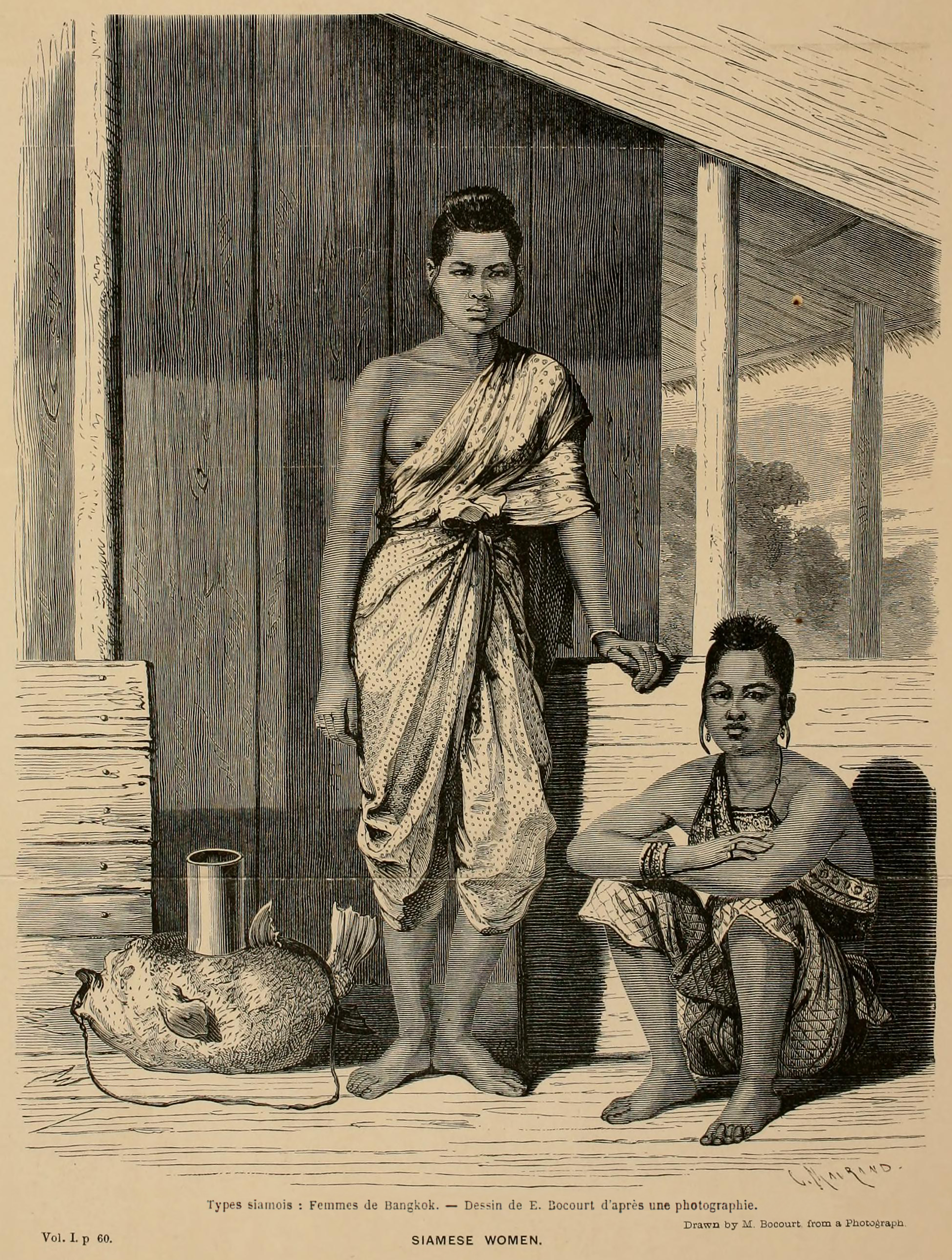
Siamese women wearing Sabai and chong kraben, 1863

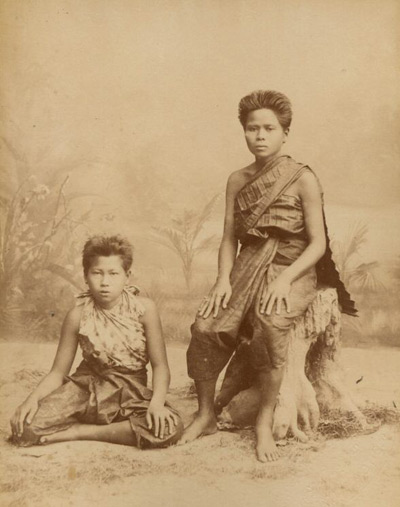
Siamese women's photo, 1890

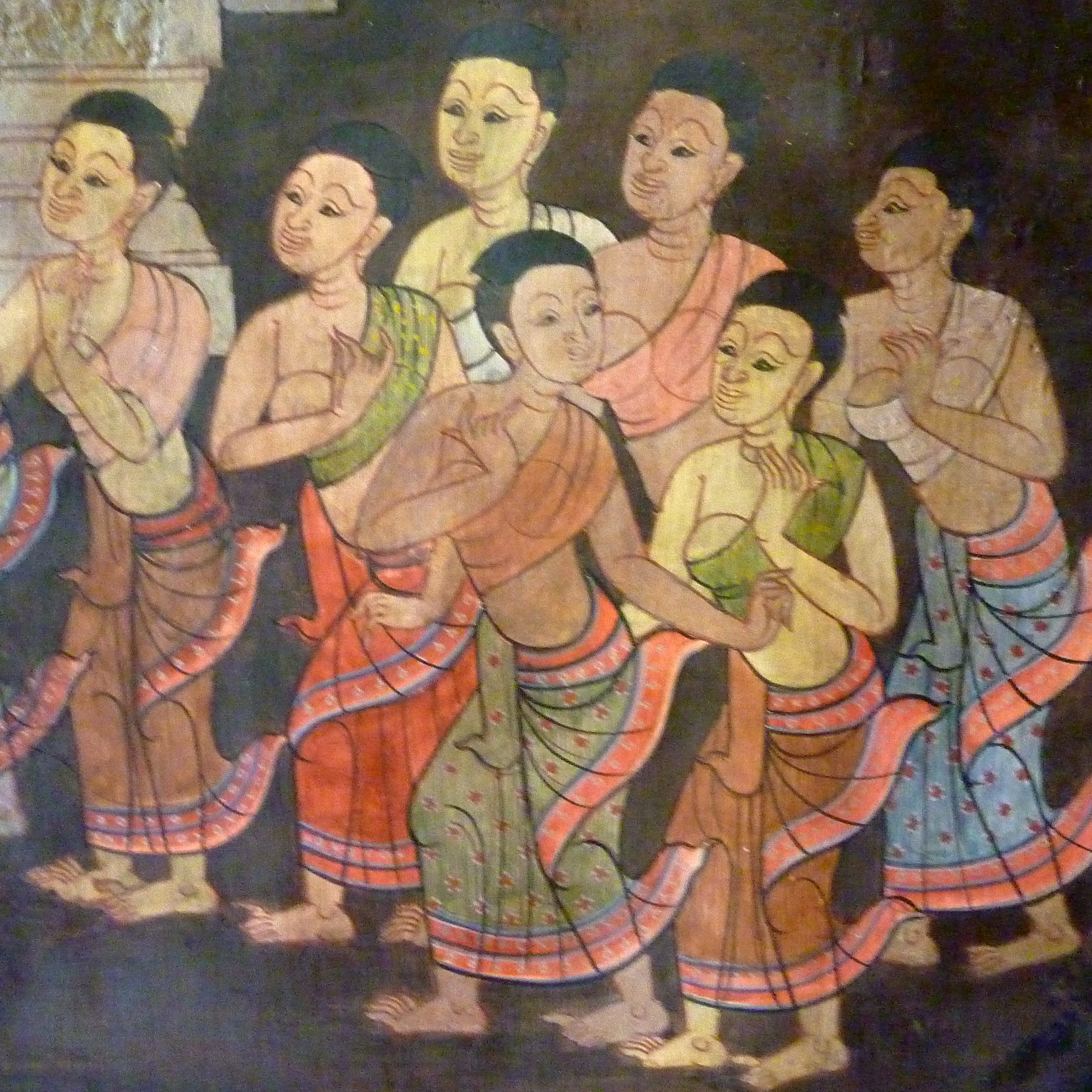
Painting of Siamese women wearing panung and sabai in Wat Pho, Bangkok

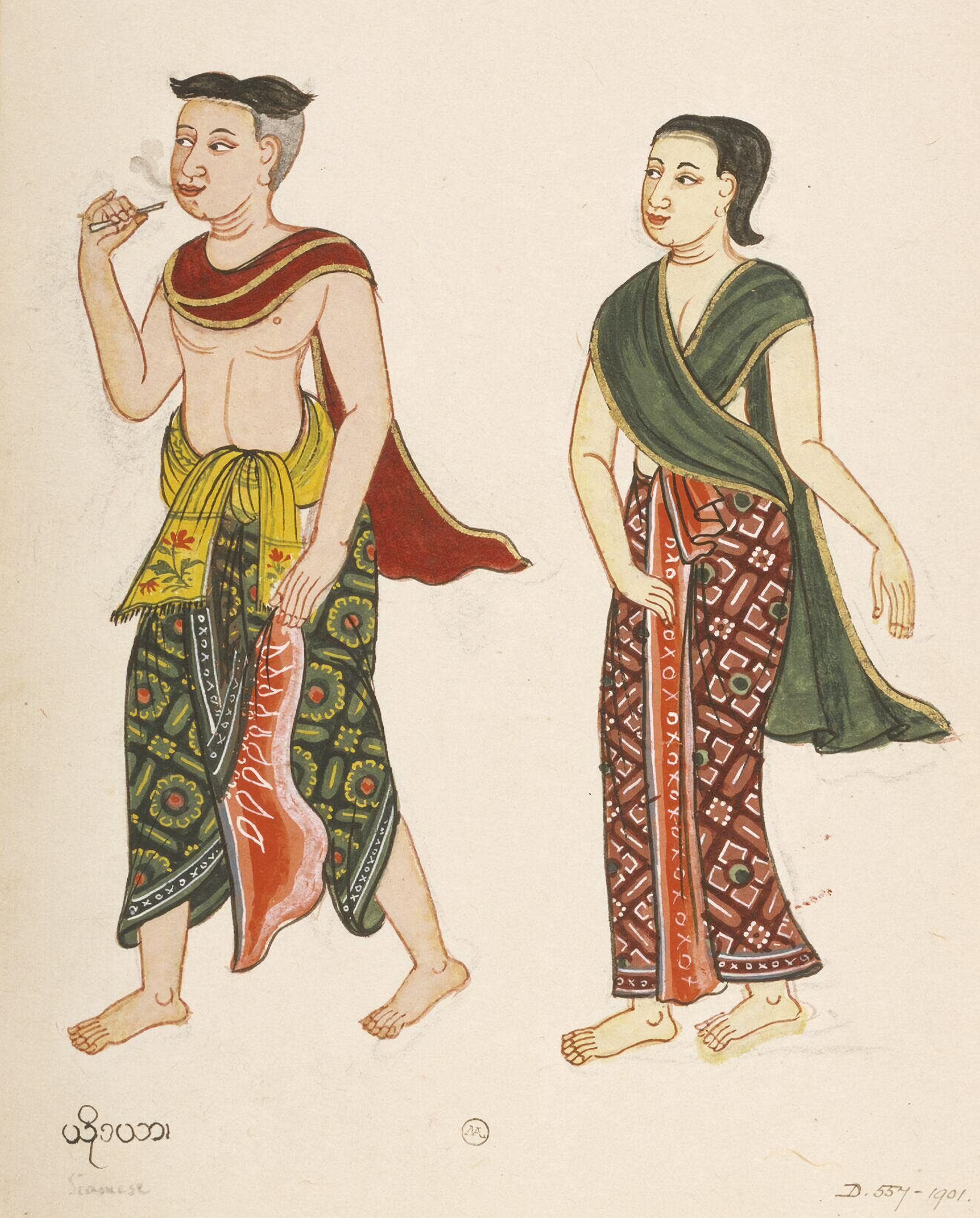
Siamese man and woman in traditional dress drawing c1887

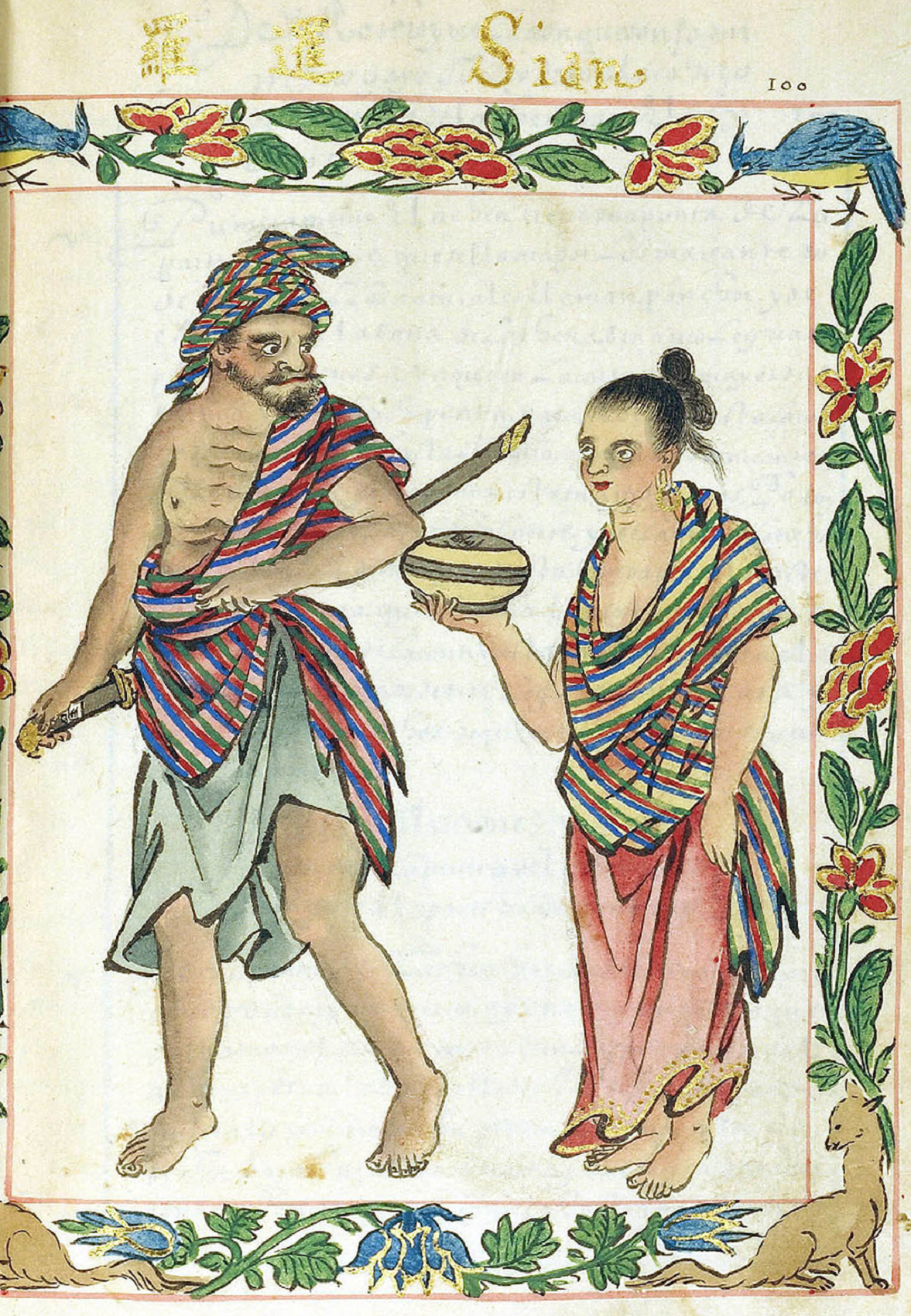
Siamese Couple illustration in the Boxer Codex c1590

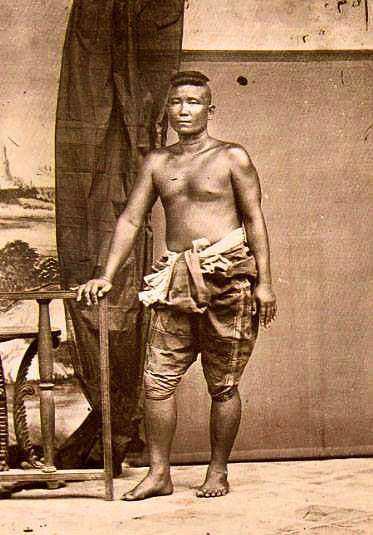
Chao Uparat Boonthawong of Chiang Mai wearing pha khao ma, 1882

== See also ==
- Xout lao
- Raj pattern
- History of Thai clothing
- Formal Thai national costume
- Culture of Thailand
- School uniforms in Thailand
