= Sampot chang samluy =

Cambodian tube garment

Sampot chong samluy

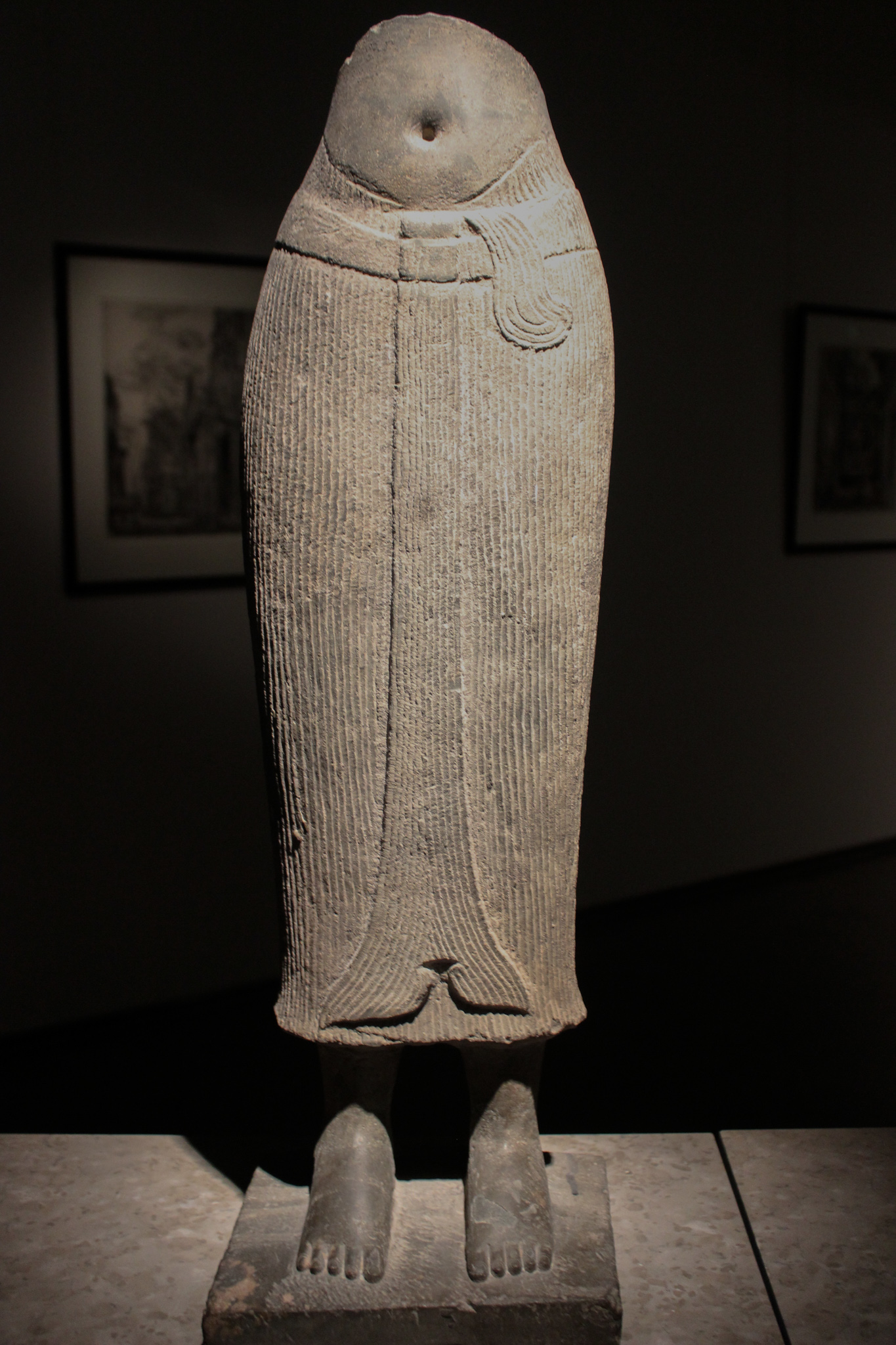
Khmer female deity wearing sampot chang samluy featuring pleats and folds in front with bunched cloth draped over a belt. 1000s AD, Guimet Museum

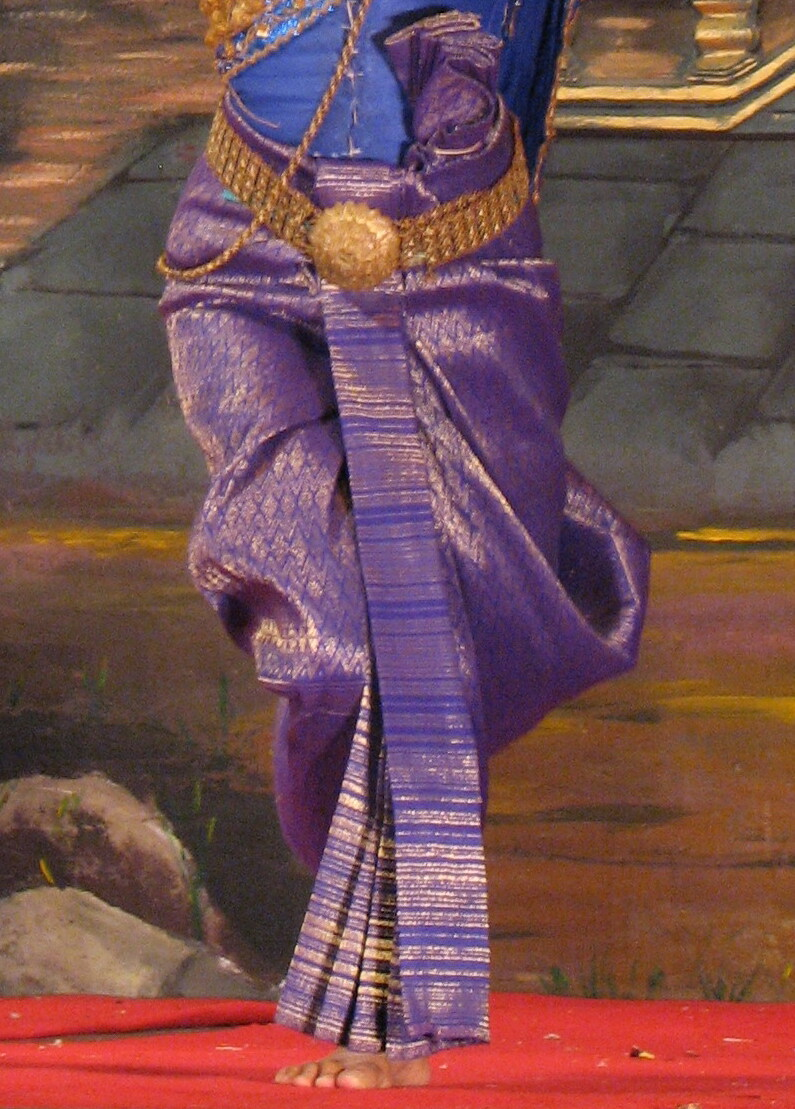
Khmer ballerina in sampot samluy sarabap "ka'at kbal neak" (“folded like the head of naga”), 2000s AD.

Sampot chang samluy (Khmer: សំពត់ចងសម្លុយ [sɑmpɔt cɑːŋ sɑmluj]) is a skirt-style garment that's wrapped around the lower body and secured at the waist. The garment is usually draped.

== Etymology ==
Sampot សំពត់ (/sɑmpʊət/), a long, rectangular cloth worn around the lower body; chang ចង (/cɑɑŋ/) refers to cloth that’s bundled, and samluy សម្លុយ (pronounced sam-luy) meaning "to wear a skirt with the hem down;" "samluy, the opposite of tying in a knot (chong kben)," and "that which is worn down, a skirt that is worn down."

== History ==
Like chang kben, chang samluy goes back to Funan and is present in ancient Khmer sculpture and carvings. Whereas both male and female figures are depicted wearing chang samluy, the overwhelming majority are seen on females. Today the samluy, a thinner sampot than that of the chong kben, is worn mostly by women.

== Styles ==
One fashion of sampot chang samluy involves the textile sarabap (also charobab), a brocaded silk with gold and silver thread worn by Khmer ballerinas, royalty, and for formal occasions. Female roles in Khmer ballet, as well as brides on their wedding day, may wear sampot sarabap ka'at kbal neak (“folded like the head of naga),” referring to how the draped bundled of folded pleats look like a naga’s head.

Another fashion of wearing sampot chang samluy is sampot bot, which translates to "folded skirt." This refers to the long, flat fold along the entire length on the side where the straightened and fitted sampot is secured, instead of the traditional practice of knotting the draped version of the garment in front. This practice may have been a response to the West's influence on Cambodian fashion. This style of chang samluy is typical among civil servants, and the silk variety may be worn for ceremonies.

== Gallery ==
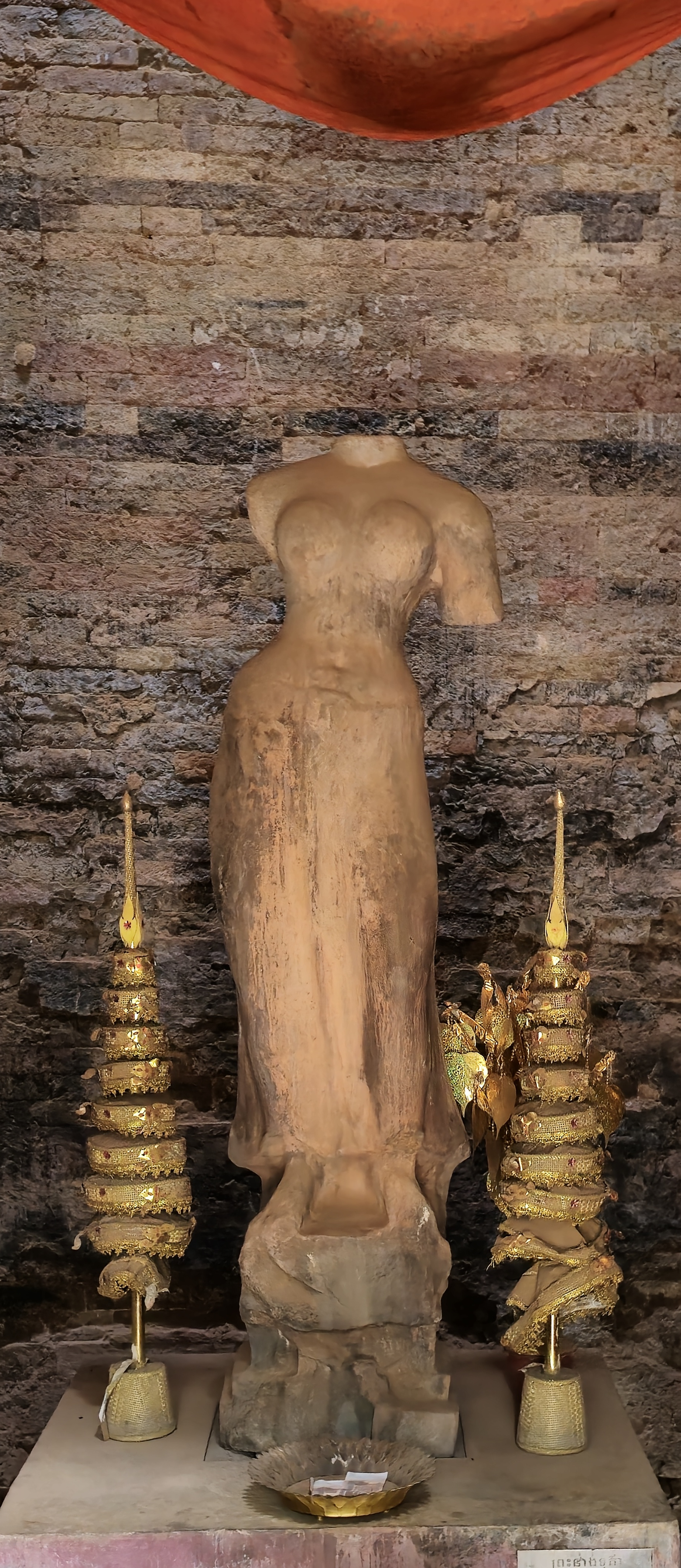
600s AD Chenla-era Durga replica in sampot chang samluy (original housed in the National Museum of Cambodia) beneath a protective pidan at Sambor Prei Kuk.

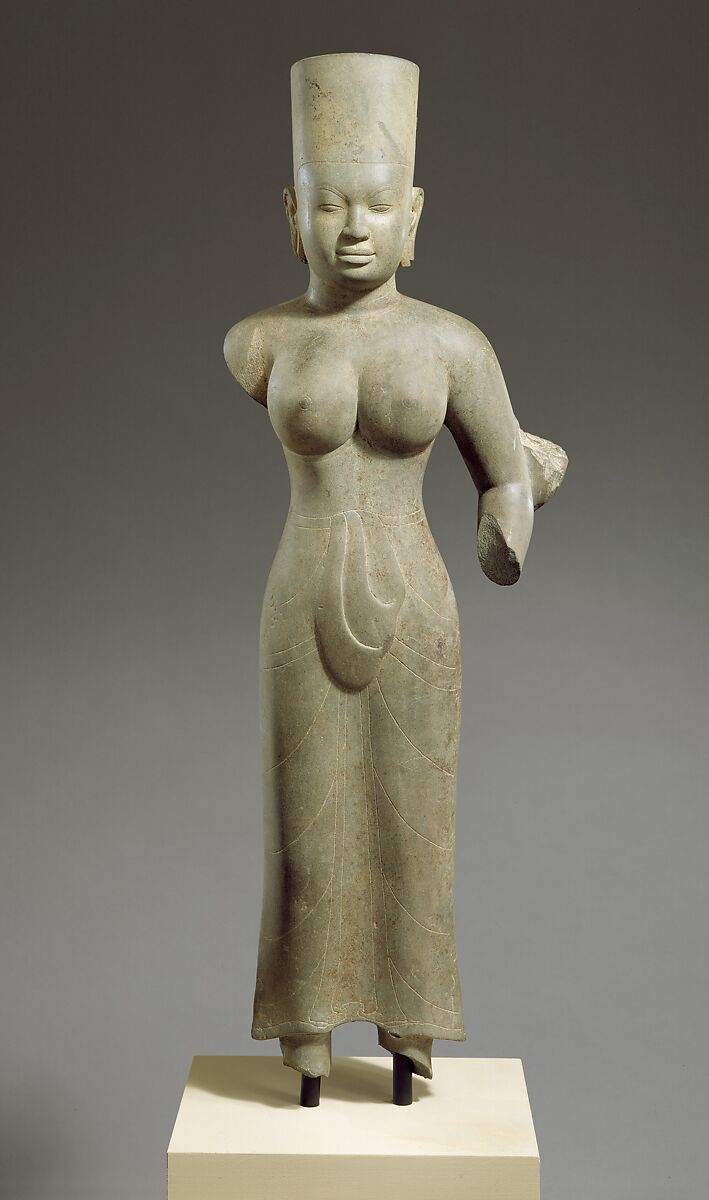
Khmer female deity, likely Durga, wearing sampot chang samluy, 675-730 AD.

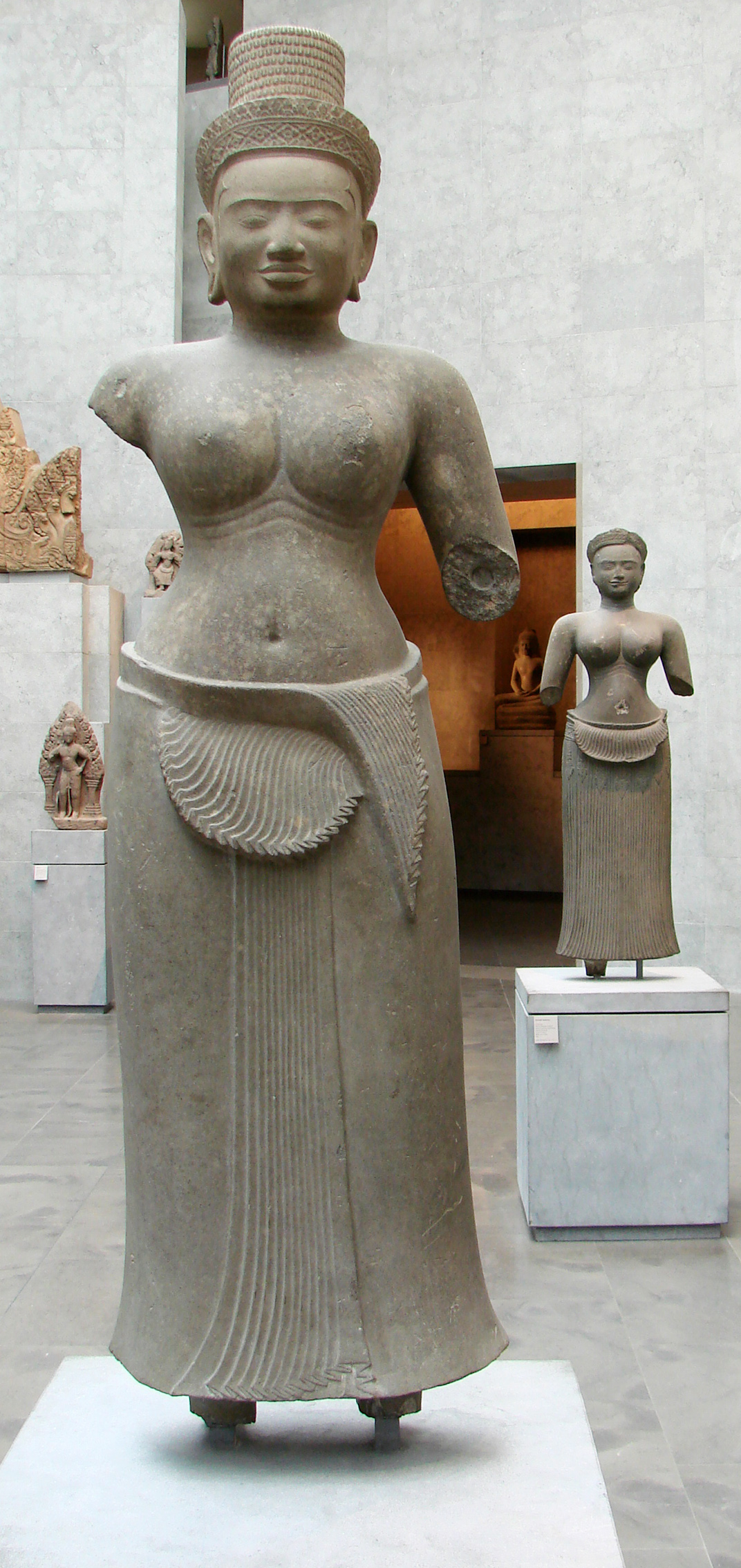
Goddess(?) in pleated chang samluy. From Bakong in Siem Reap province, Preah Ko style. Late 800s AD.

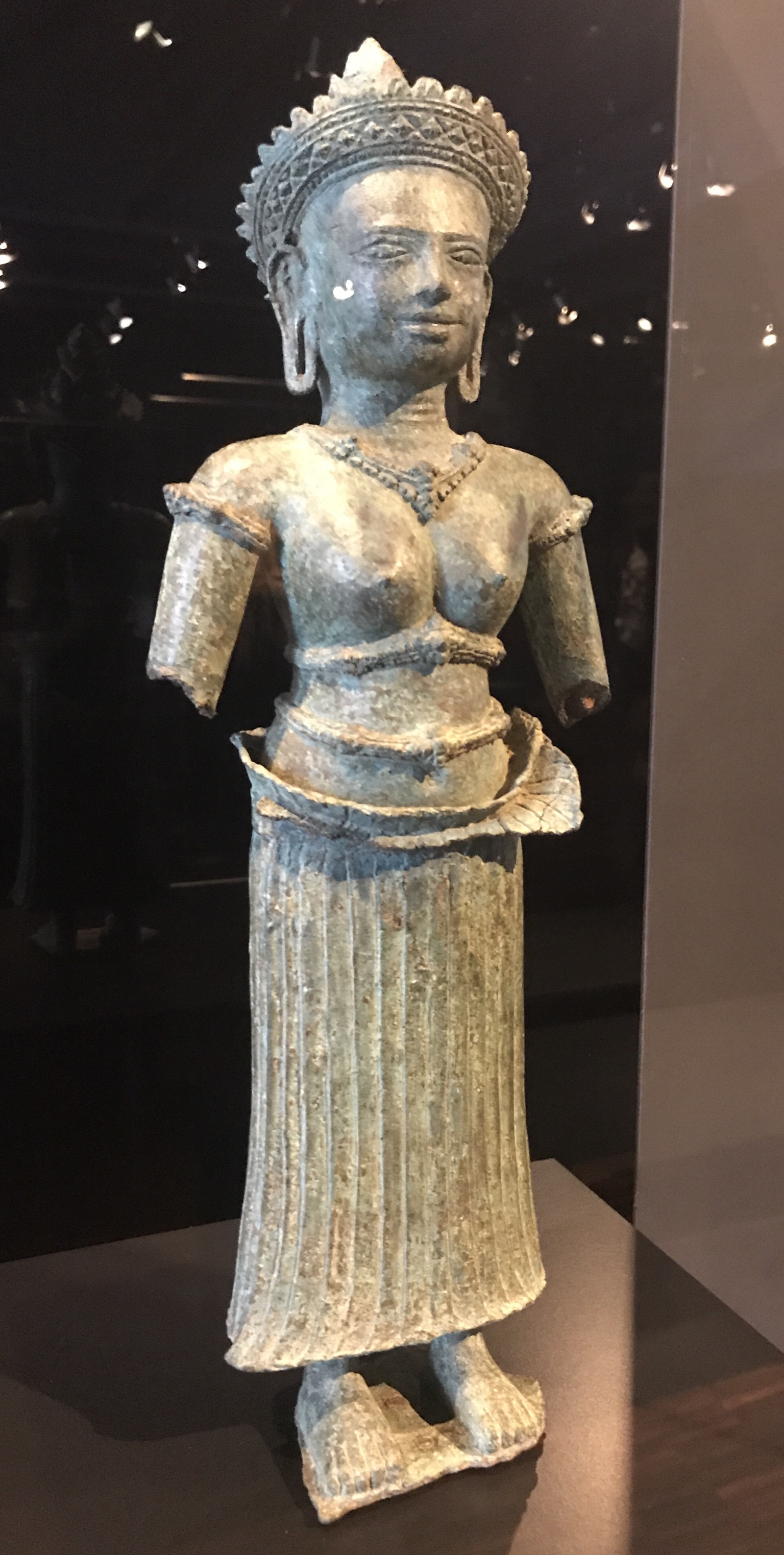
Female deity(?) in pleated chang samluy with folds, 900s AD.

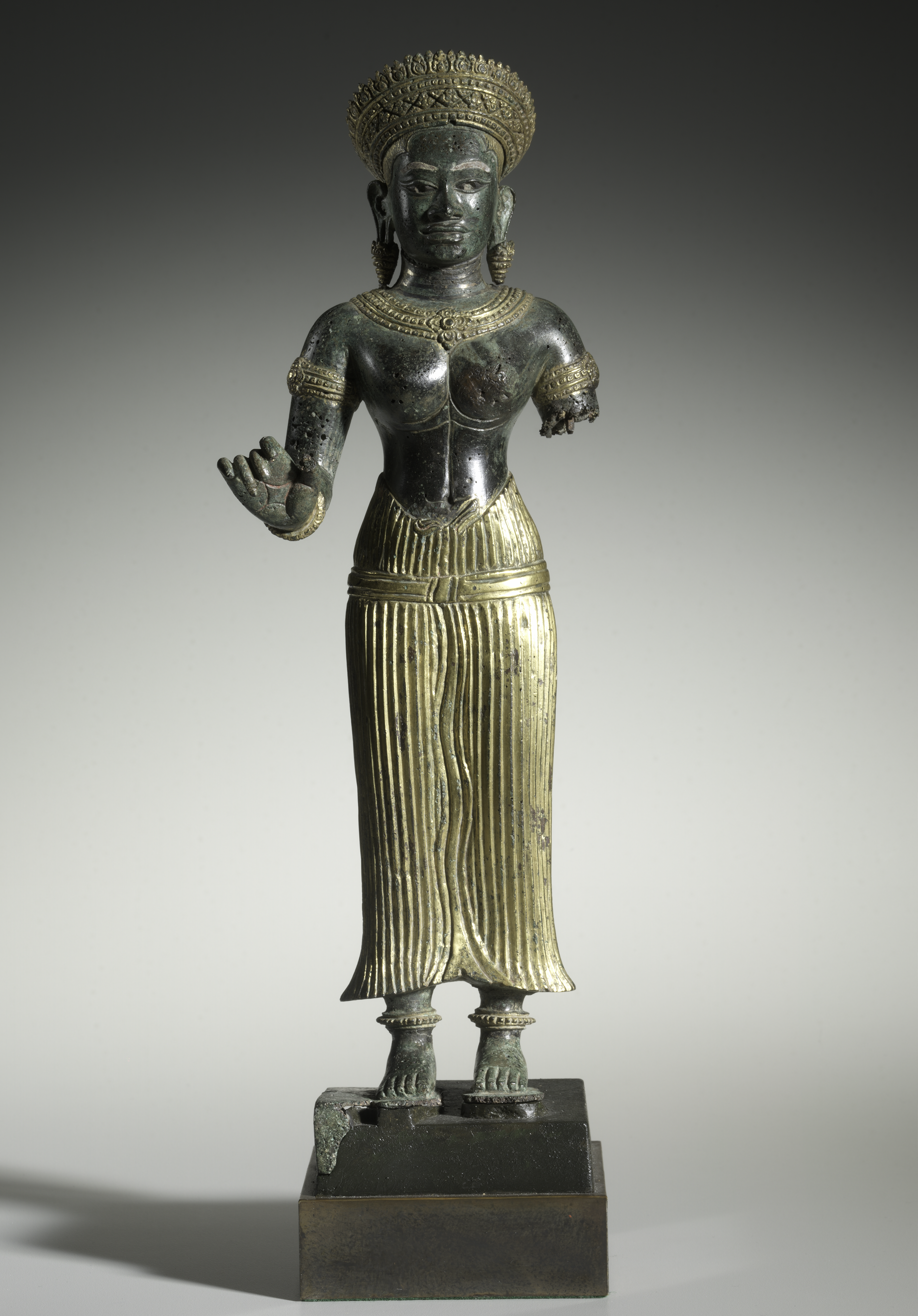
Royal woman in pleated chang samluy, late 1000s AD. Baphuon/Angkor Wat transition style.

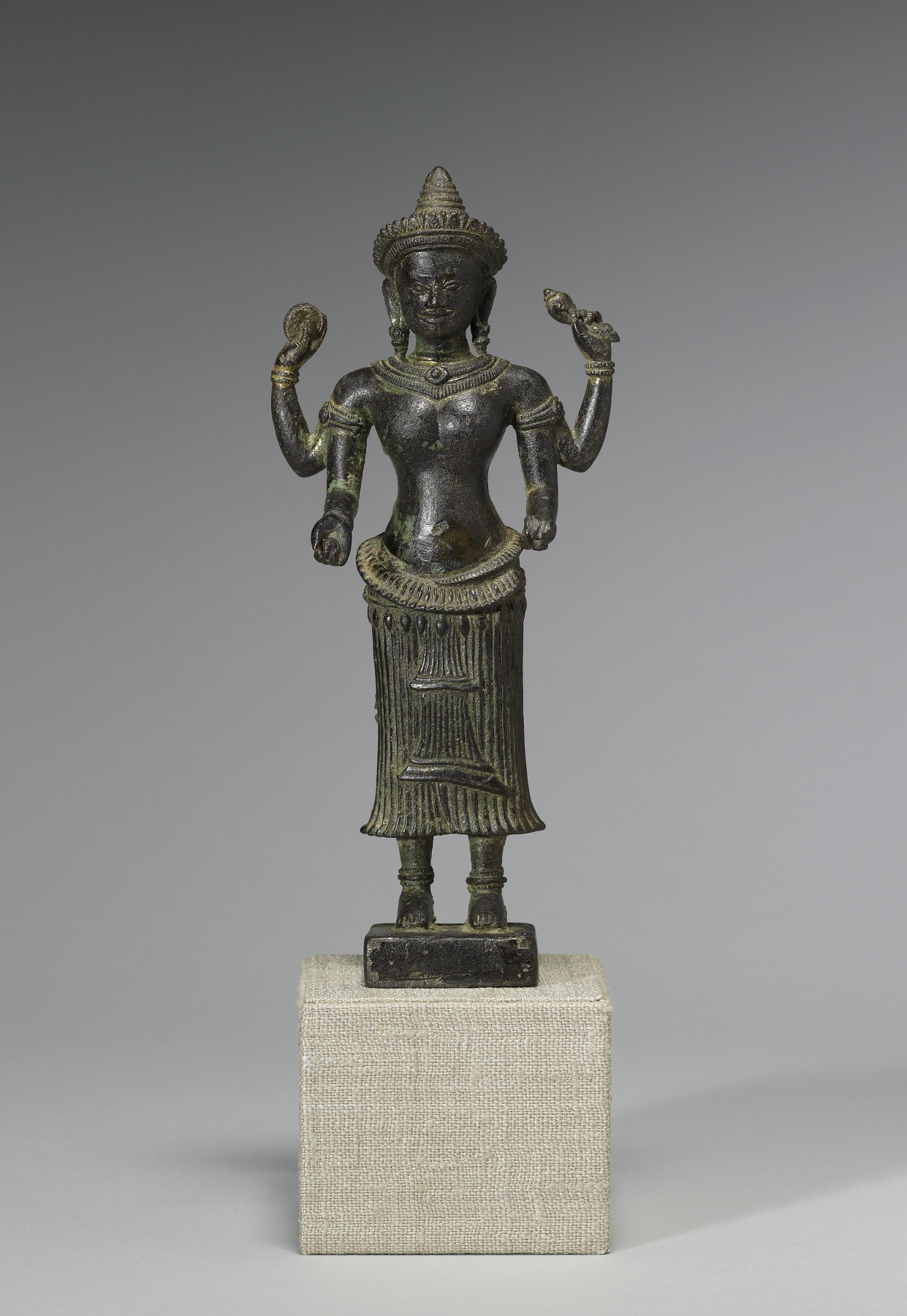
Bronze of Uma (goddess) wearing elaborately pleated and folded chang samluy, between 1110 and 1160 AD, Angkor Wat.

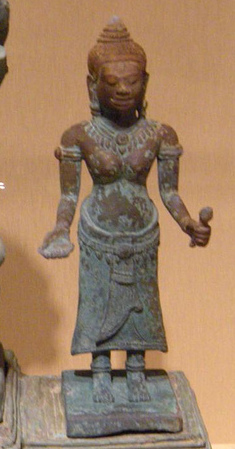
Prajnaparamita of the Khmer Buddhist Trinity in pleated and folded samluy-style sampot, 1200s AD.

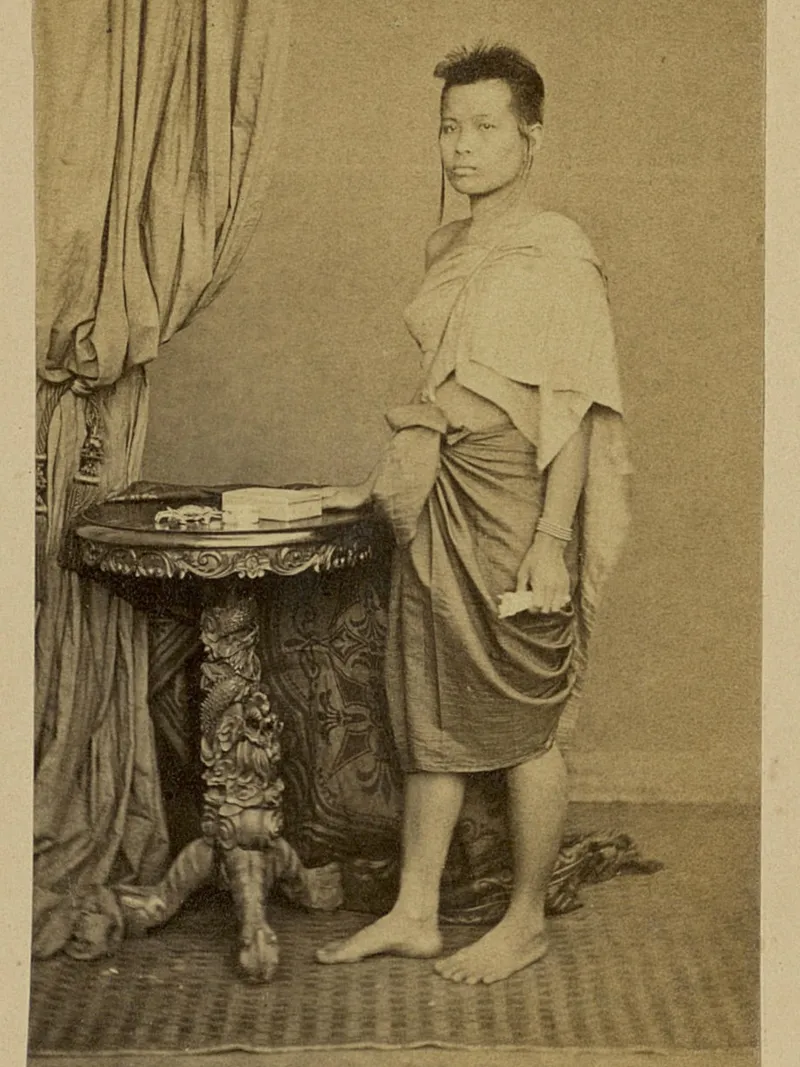
Royal Khmer ballerina Neang Sok in knotted samluy-style sampot, likely phamuong given her status, paired with sbai, circa 1860 AD.

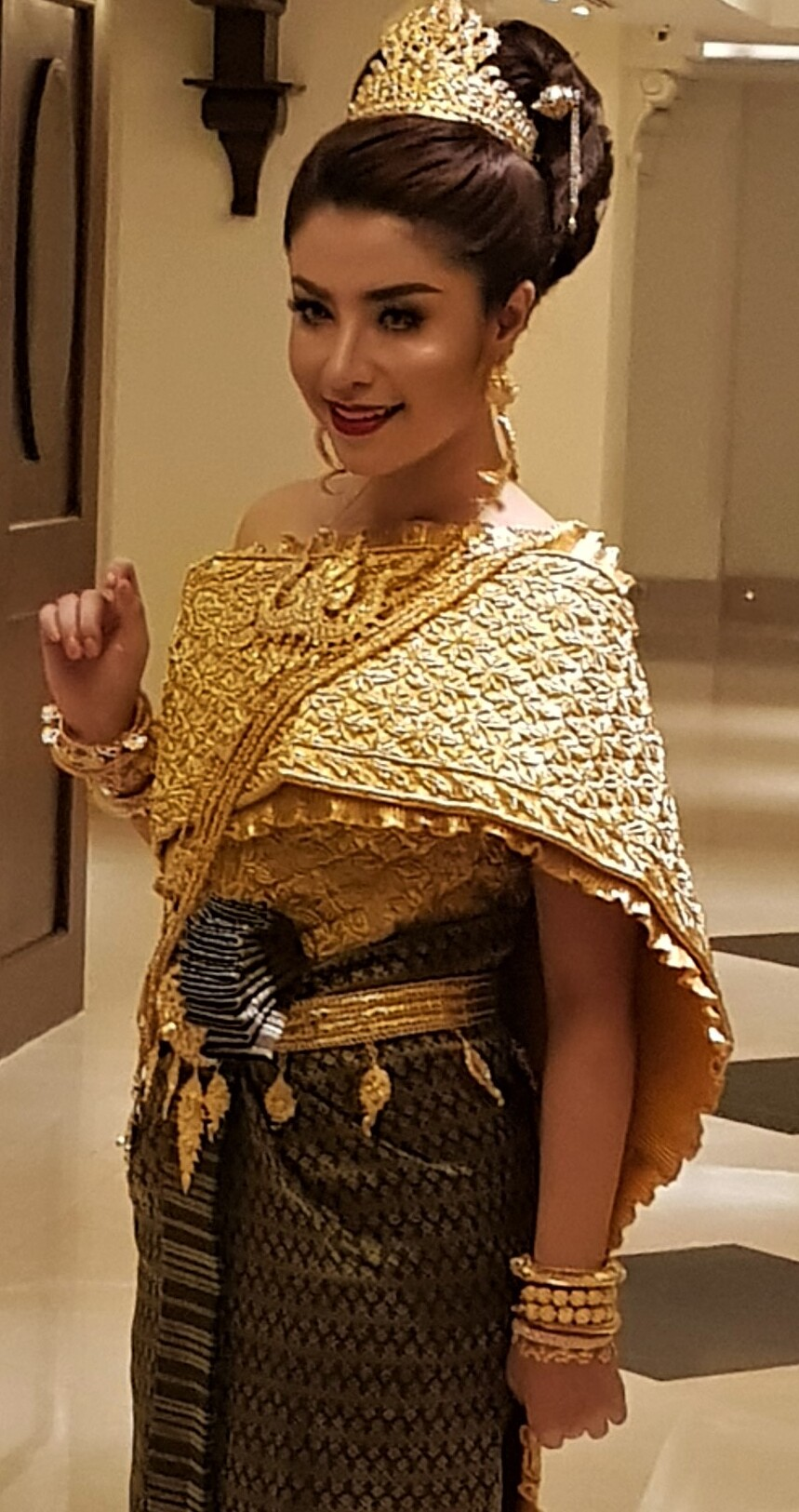
Cambodian bride in sampot sarabap ka'at kbal neak ("sampot sarabap folded like the head of naga."), a way of wearing samluy-style sampot sarabap.

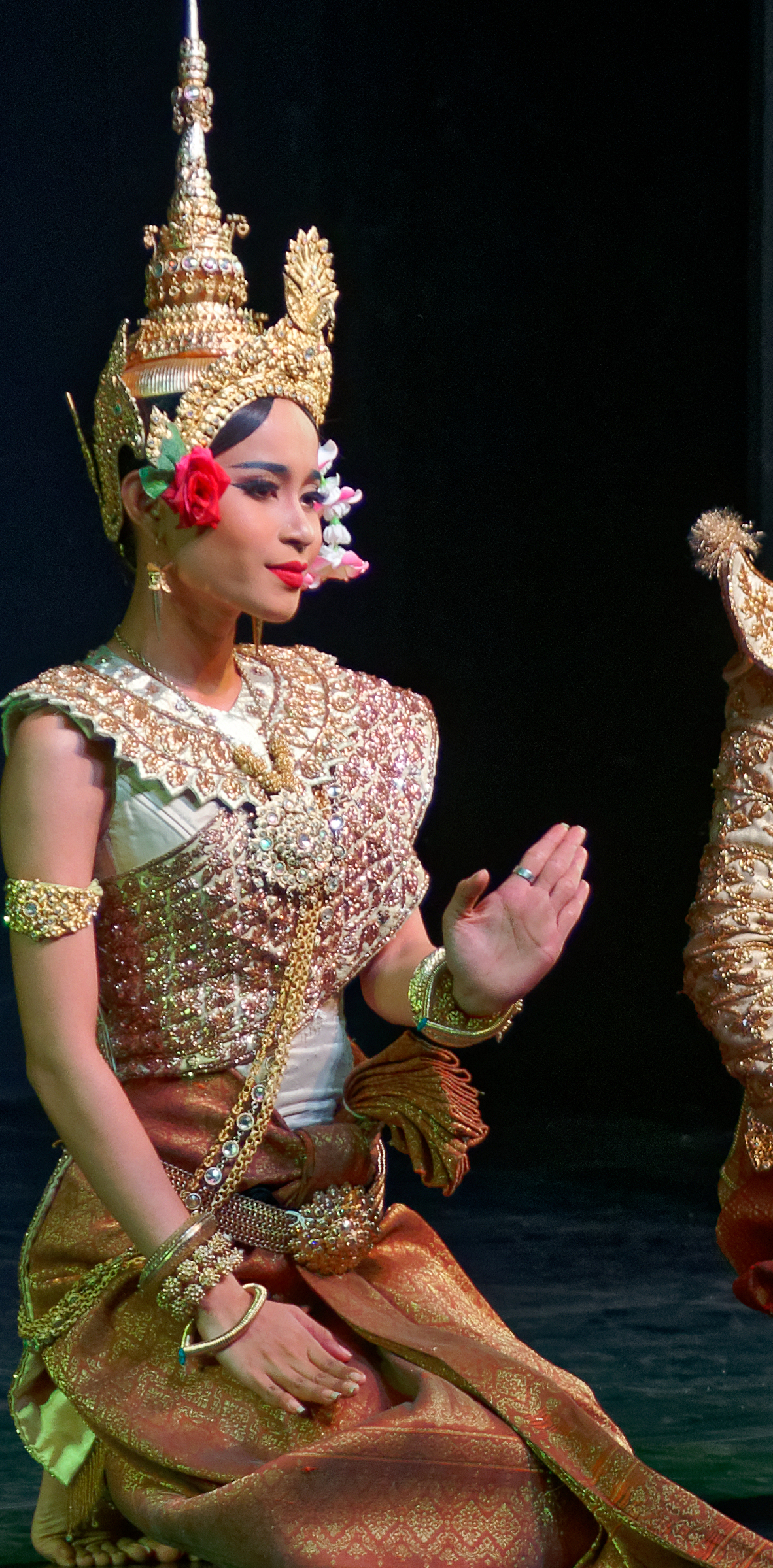
Khmer ballerina in another example of sampot sarabap ka'at kbal neak, a way of wearing samluy-style sampot sarabap.

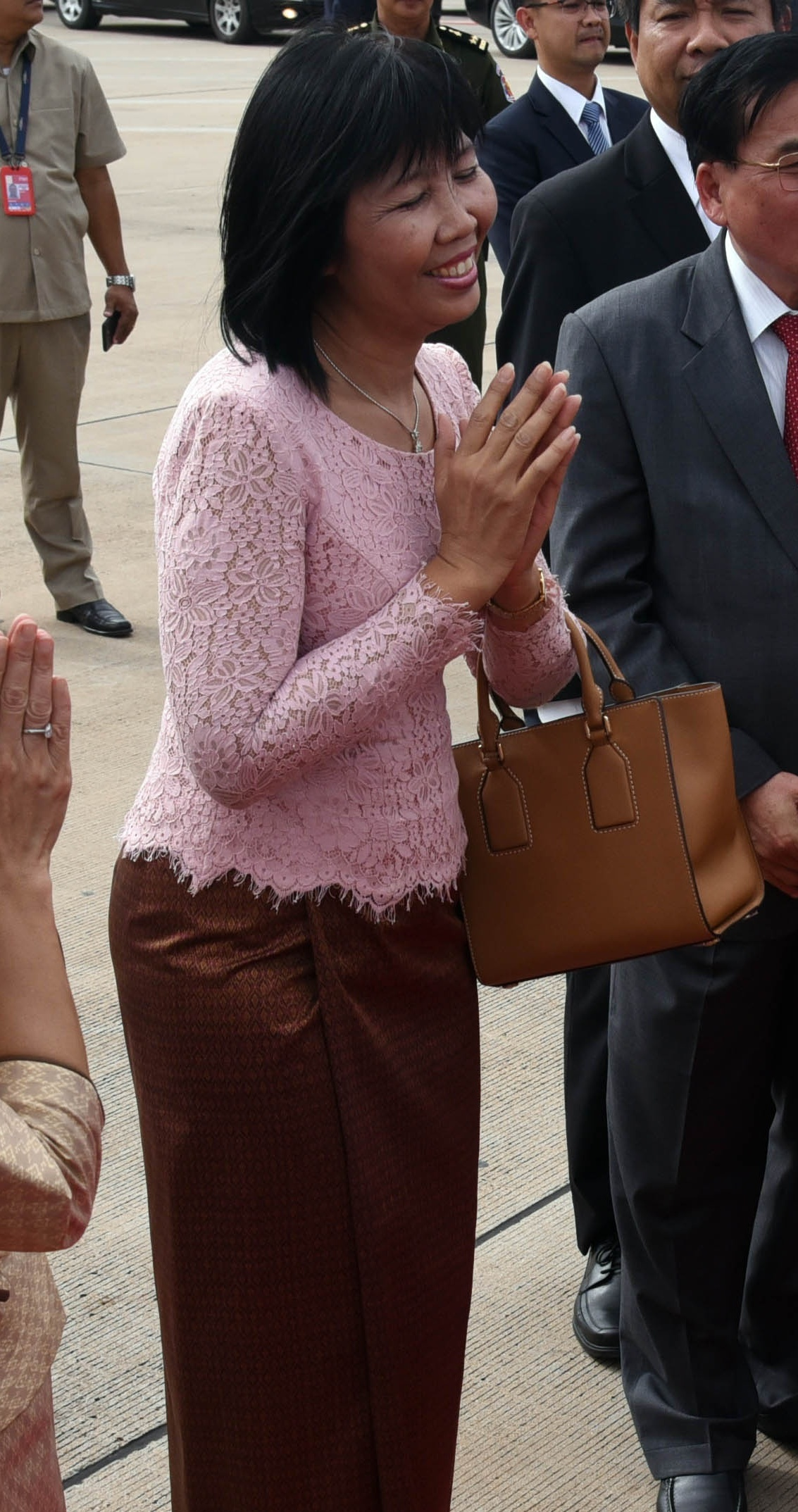
Eat Sophea in sampot bot, a style of samluy, paired with an lace av pak.

== See also ==
- Khmer traditional clothing
