= Sampot =

Cambodian traditional dress

A sampot (Khmer: សំពត់ /sɑmpʊət/ Khmer pronunciation: [sɑmpɔt]), is a traditional dress in Cambodia.

== Etymology ==
Sampot (Khmer: សំពត់, romanized: saṃba't) is a modern Khmer term that refers to "cloth", "woman's skirt", and "a piece of cloth used as a lower garment, specifically the Khmer sarong." It is derived from several terms, including "saṃbata, sambata, saṃbūta, saṃmbuta, sambattha, and sabvata," which can be found in groups of the Inscription Modern Angkor Wat (IMA) from the 16th and 17th centuries CE, during the middle Khmer period. The root of the word sampot is ba't and ba'ta, which mean "to encircle, surround." The terms *sbat and 'sba'ta are derived from this root and mean "to gird, wrap, or envelop (the body)."

Indian scholar Ramanlal Nagarji Mehta suggests that the Khmer word sampat-hol for textiles may date back to the Sanskrit word sam-patola (Sanskrit: सम्-पटोल), meaning "like a Patola." It is highly likely that the fabric and technique were brought by Hindu immigrants in the 3rd or 4th centuries CE, if the Khmer word is derived from Sanskrit.

The term "Sampot" also entered the Thai court as sompak (Thai: สมปัก) and song pak. (Thai: สองปัก) According to historical records, "An official letter from the Dutch East India Company (VOC) in Ayutthaya to an official in Surat", dated 2 December 1662, during the 16th and 17th centuries of the Ayutthaya period, the Siam court ordered textiles from India and Cambodia known as "pha poom, sompak poom (pha sompak puum), and sompak lai." These textiles were later narrowed down by the Siamese court as the traditional attire worn by Siamese nobles that was bestowed upon Siamese nobles by the King of Siam.

== Origins ==
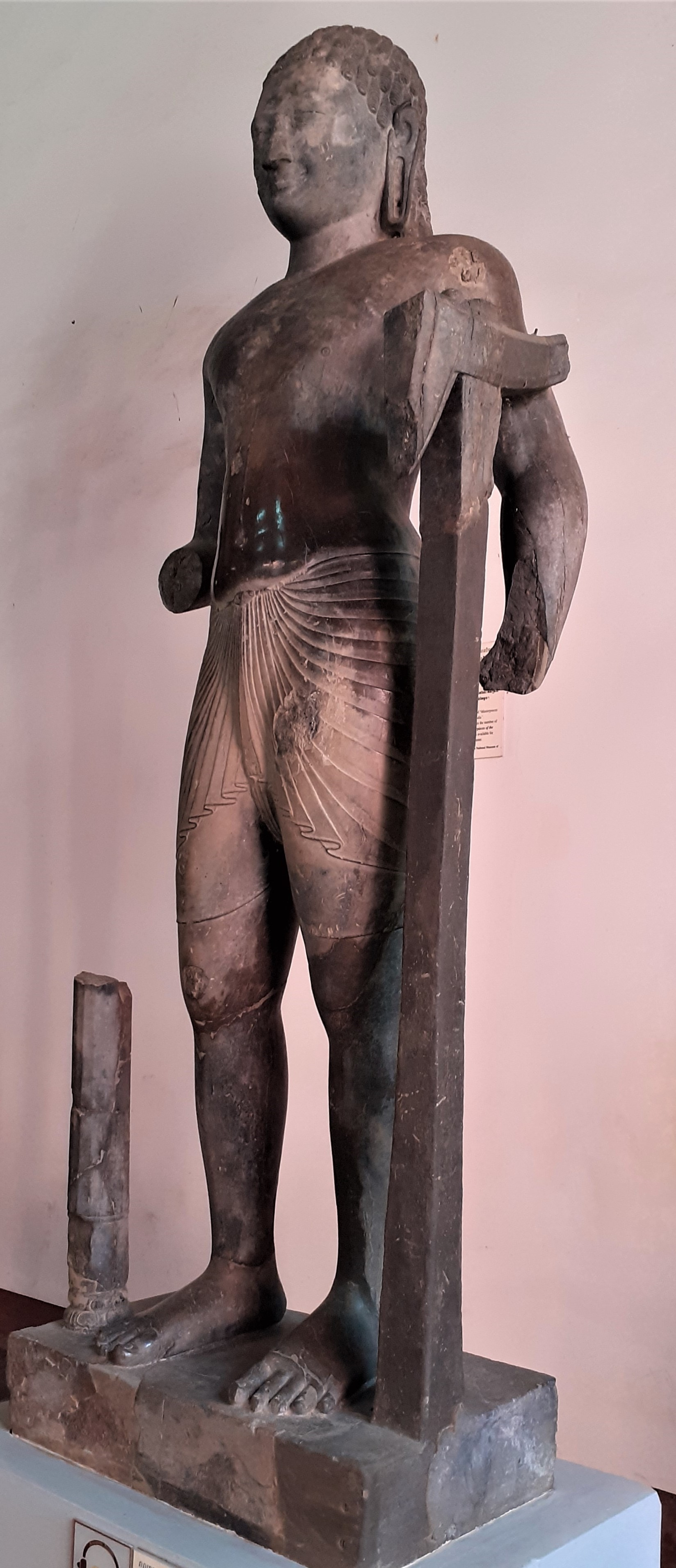
500-600s AD Khmer Balarama wearing sampot chong kben, from Phnom Da, National Musieum of Cambodia.

Scholars say its acceptable to contend that the Khmer sampot chong kben corresponds to the dhoti, the sampot samluy fashioned with bunched pleats corresponds to the sari, and the knotted version of the sampot corresponds to the lunghi. The ancient bas-reliefs provide a complete look at what fabrics were like, down to patterns and pleats.

The sampot dates back to the Funan era. Kang Tai and Zhu Ying, a third-century Chinese envoy to Funan, reported that the people were “naked” with women wearing only “tube-shaped” cloth. In response to the envoy’s remarks that people in this “beautiful country" are “so indecently exposed,” the king ruled that the men of Funan wear “horizontal cloth wraps.” The wealthy manufactured brocade for these garments whereas the poor only wove cloth. Zhao Rukuo reported in the early 13th century that Cambodia exported raw silk, though according to Zhou Daguan's late 13th century report, silk was not produced or woven by the "locals" at Angkor, the area he visited and Cambodia's capital in the late 13th century. Instead, kapok was weaved on a backstrap loom. Zhou wrote that the King as well as ordinary people, "go naked to the waist, wrapped only in a cloth. When they are out and about they wind a larger piece of cloth over the small one."

In Khmer art, deities in the pre-Angkor era are depicted in "skirt cloths," or sampot samluy, knotted at the waist. This style of the garment are depicted only on women starting circa the 900s AD. During this period, two styles retained by Cambodians today appear: pleating edge panels of the sampot into a draped bundle fastened with a belt, and the sampot wrapped around and tucked into the waist.

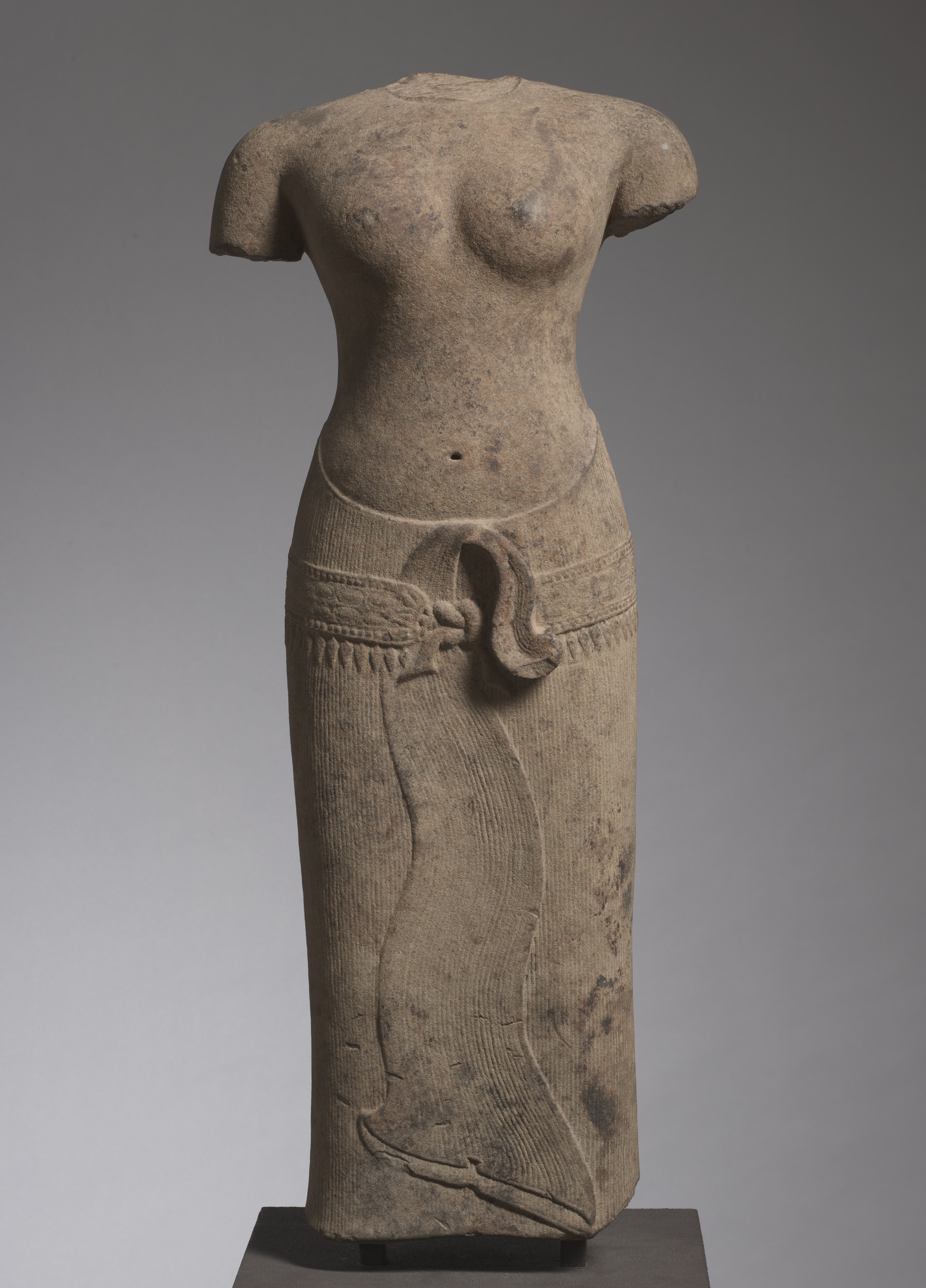
Figure wearing sampot samluy, mid/late 1000s AD, Baphuon style.

The 12th-early 13th century depicts the sampot’s pattern pushed into a fold and secured with a belt. On the refined sampot of apsaras or devatas seen in Angkor carvings from this era, art historian Gillian Green writes that the fabric emerging from the devatas' waist can be explained by a second garment, perhaps a chong kben undergarment. Both bear “weft-oriented bands” on the ends. An elaborate male counterpart is chong kben featuring lengths of fabric with a pendant sash (or pamn muk) front and center. In the pre-Angkor era, unadorned or plain “warp-striped” pieces of fabric are depicted. By the Baphuon period (11th century), pleats were popular. “Random or ordered” floral patterns were fashionable in depictions by the 12th and 13th century.

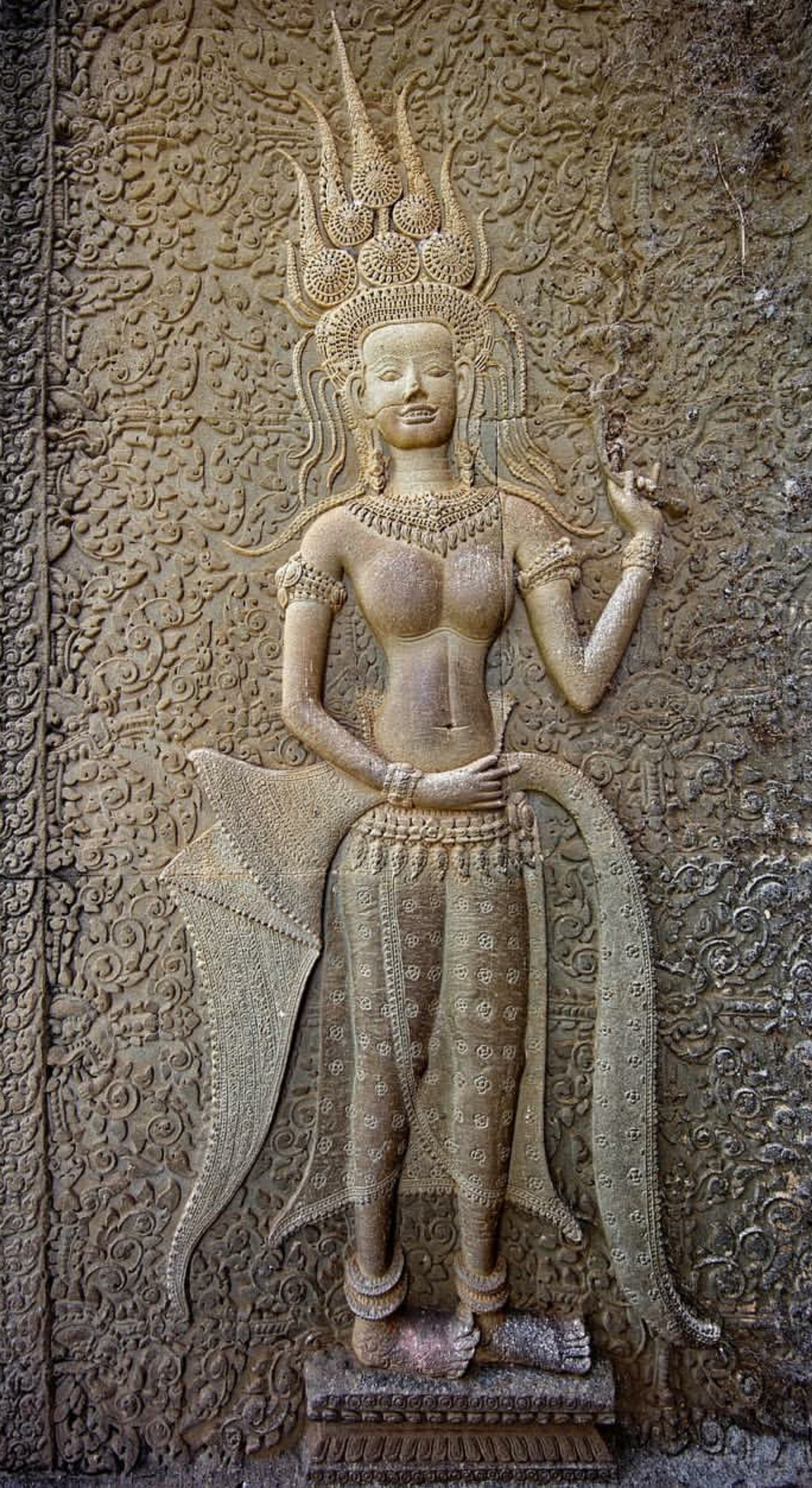
Devata in patterned sampot. Historian Gillian Green suggests a chong kben undergarment can explain the pieces of fabric emerging from the waist and cascading down the sampot. Angkor Wat (12th century).

For an 1856 Gift of Mutual Respect, Siamese King Mongkut and his Second King Phra Pin Klao presented US President Franklin Pierce three woven pairs of Khmer silk sampot chong kben of hol variety, in addition to “a similarly-patterned silk shoulder cloth.” Gillian Green writes that the method and design showed high sophistication, suggesting a long history of practice. Author and archaeologist Lisa McQuail wrote that King Mongkut describes the Thai silk items included in the Harris Treaty Gifts as “second quality,” likely because they were not as fine as the Khmer hol silks included.

In the run-up to the 1993 Cambodian general election, Khmer leader Son Sann in a heated debate called for a sampot test to be used to establish whether or not women could vote or not in the election; walking a few yards in a tight sampot would be a sign of true Khmer identity, in contrast with the Vietnamese women who would usually wear pants under the áo dài.

Silk weaving was an important part of Cambodia's cultural past. People from Takéo Province have woven silk since the Funan era. Complex methods and intricate patterns have been developed to make the cloth, one of which is the hol method which involves the uneven twill technique. The reason they adopted such an unusual method remains unclear.

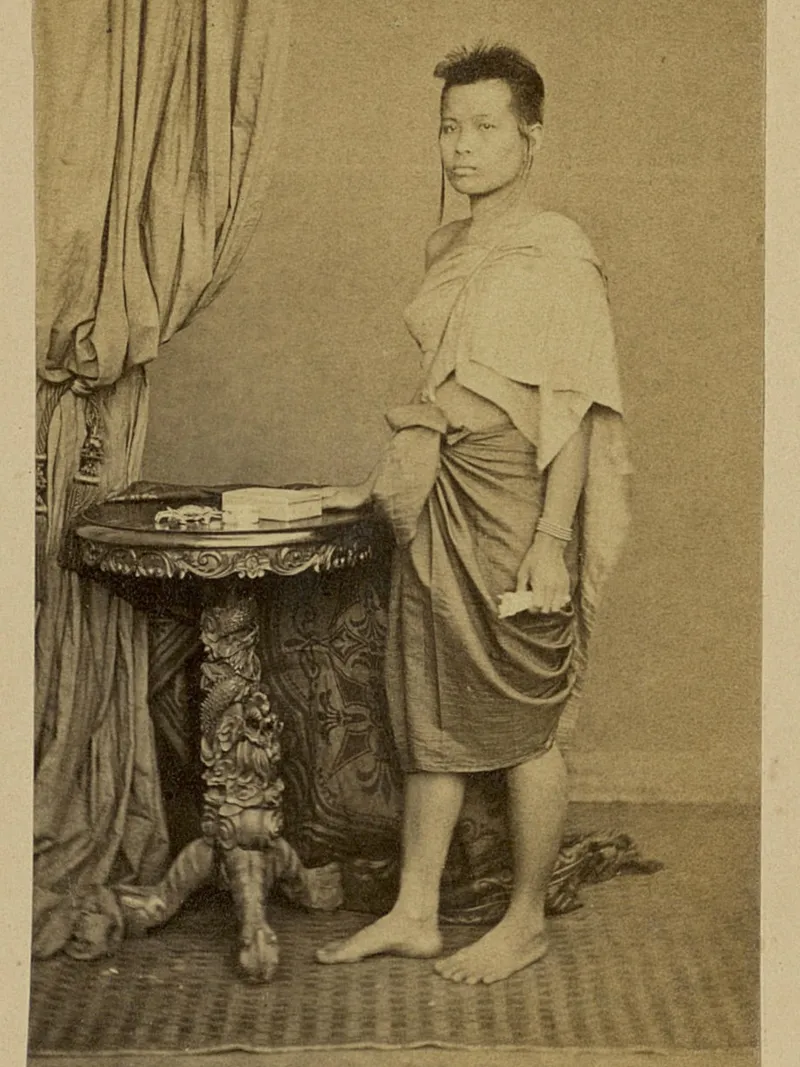
Khmer ballerina Neang Sok in Khmer sbai & sampot samloy, 1860s by Émile Gsell.

In 1858–1860, Henri Mouhot, a French naturalist and explorer, embarked on a journey to mainland Southeast Asia (Indochinese Peninsula) where he had the opportunity to meet the king of the Khmer court. In his diary, Travels in the Central Parts of Indo-China (Siam), Cambodia, and Laos, during the years 1858, 1859, and 1860, Mouhot described the attire of the Cambodian king during his encounter:

Like his subjects, he generally wears nothing but the langouti, the native dress. His was composed of yellow silk, confined at the waist by a magnificent belt of gold studded with precious stones.

— Henri Mouhot, Travels in the Central Parts of Indo-China (Siam), Cambodia, and Laos… (1858–60).

In George Groslier's Recherches sur les Cambodgiens (1921), a French director of Cambodia Arts during the French protectorate of Cambodia, observed the sampot:

The word sampot must be a very old word, as old as the garment because it means: "cloth" and not a special part of the Khmer costume. Originally, it was a fabric tunic like this horizontal strip of cloth in Chinese texts, and therefore a garment tunic. From cotton, it became silk, and was decorated with polychrome designs as we studied at the beginning of this chapter. At first glance, it is nothing other than the widened belt and is draped much like it. Until the 12th century it seems narrower than the current sampot and is only worn by men and certain sacred dancers (?). Women wear a sarong and we know that the fashion for the sampot common to both sexes is modern and probably a Siamese innovation. (Note: In French: Le mot sampot doit être un bien vieux mot» aussi vieux que le vêtement car il signifie : « étoffe » et non pas une partie spéciale du costume khmer. A l’origine, il était Tunique étoffe comme cette bande de toile horizontale des textes chinois, et donc Tunique vêtement. De coton, il est devenu de soie, s’est orné de dessins polychromes ainsi que nous Tarons étudié au début de ce chapitre. Au prime abord, il n’est pas autre chose que la ceinture élargie et se drape à peu près comme elle. Jusqu’au xue siècle il semble plus étroit que le sampot actuel et n’est porté que par les hommes et certaines danseuses sacrées (?). La femme, elle, se vêt du sarong et nous savons que la mode du sampot commun aux deux sexes est moderne et probablement innovation siamoise.)

— George Groslier, Recherches sur les Cambodgiens (1921).

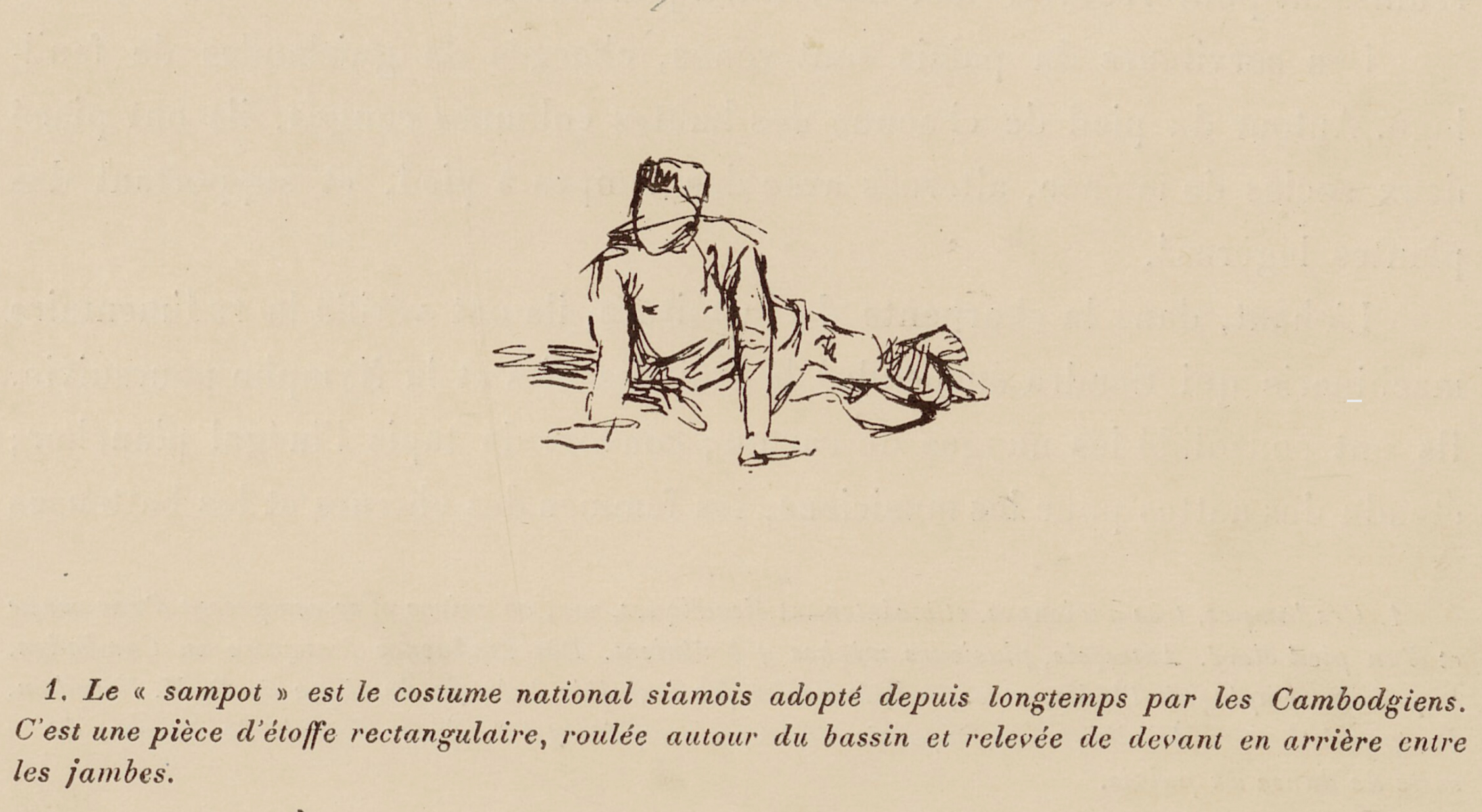
The George Groslier's original work describes: "The sampot is the Siamese national costume, long adopted by the Cambodians. It is a rectangular piece of fabric, rolled around the waist and tucked from the front to the back between the legs."

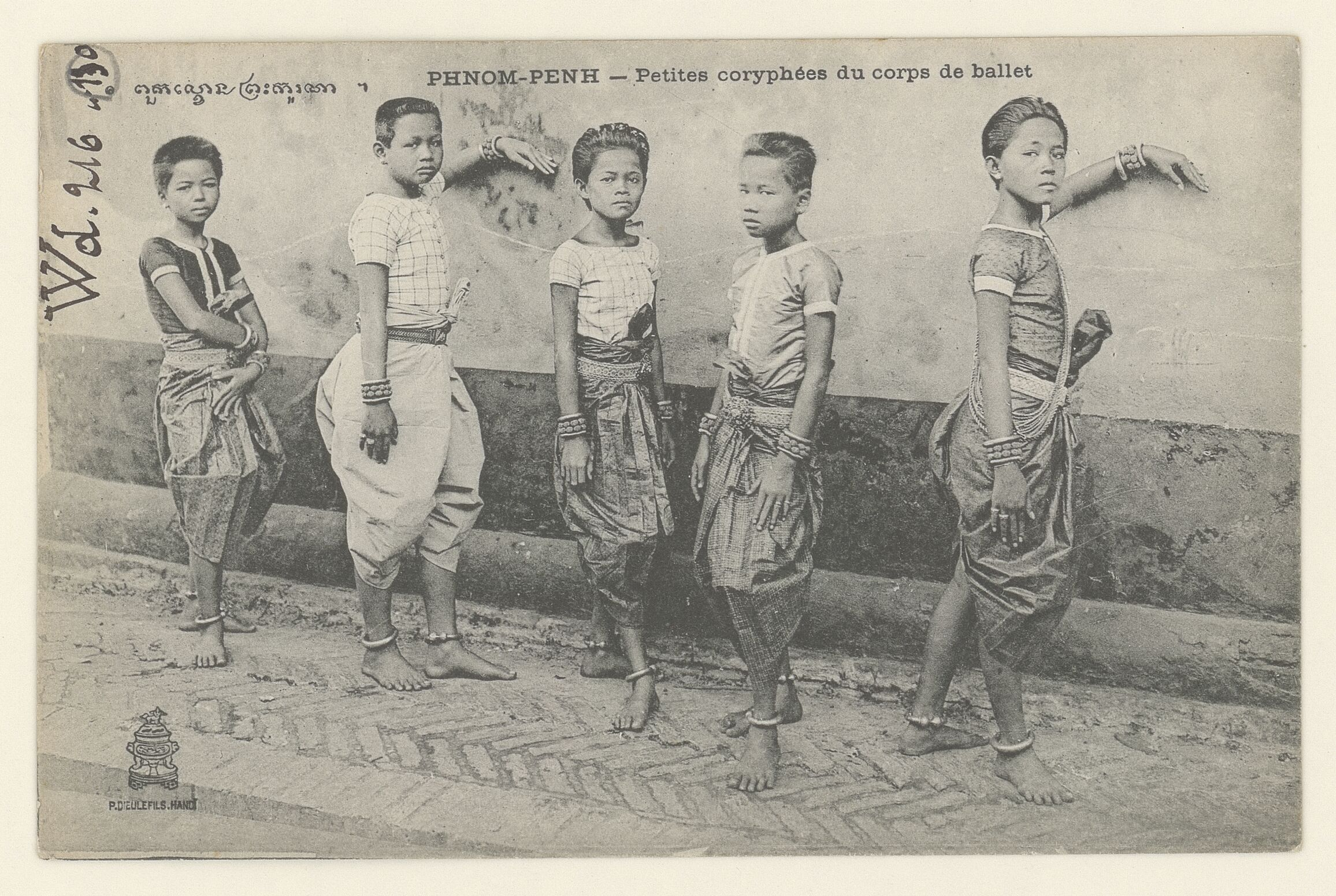
Khmer girls in dance practice outfit: aww nay (or av nay) with a sampot chong kben, 1906.

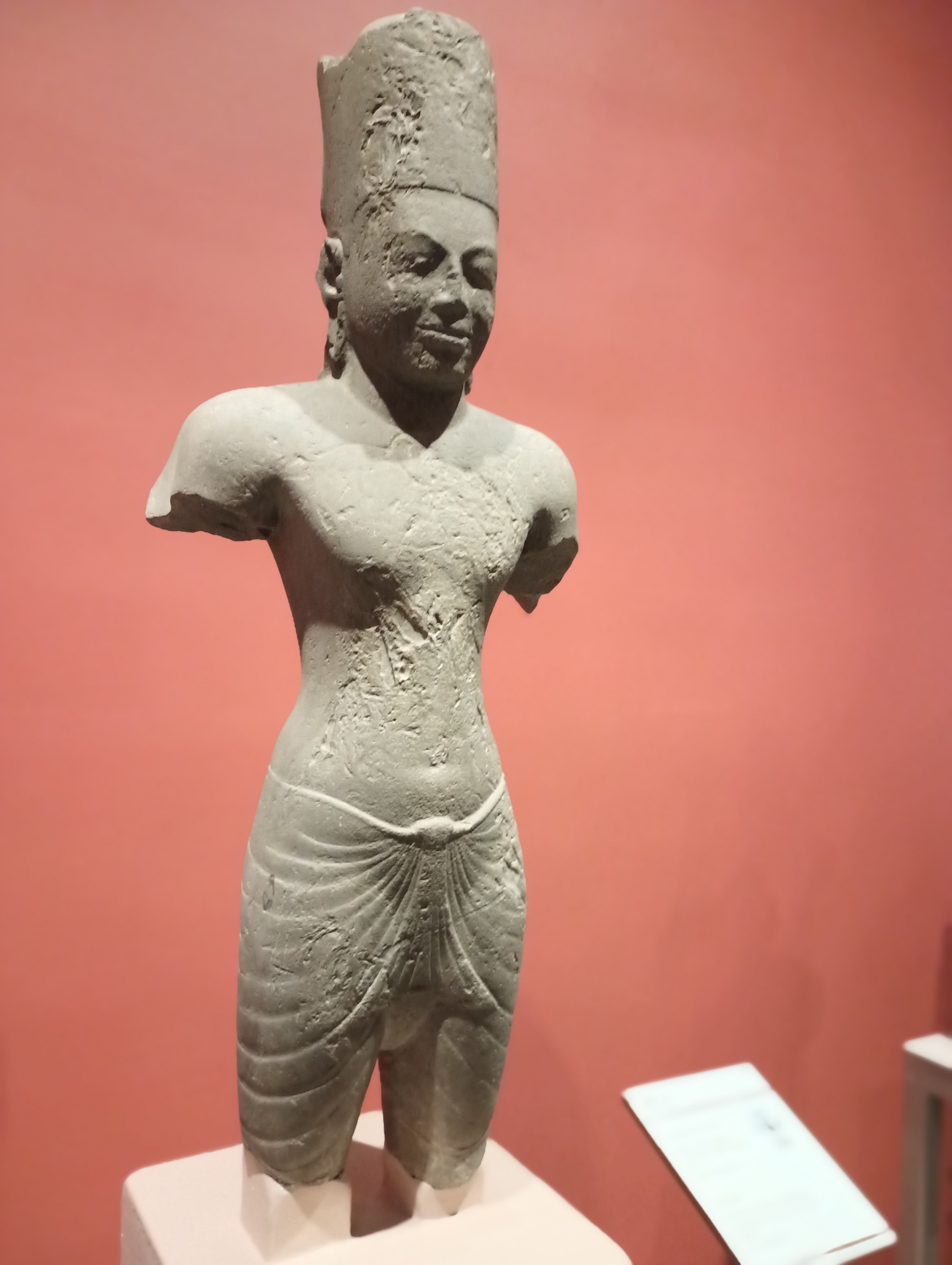
Vishnu depicted in Khmer sampot chong kben, 6th century.

In 1936, Harriet Winifred Ponder, a British traveller who journeyed through Southeast Asia and the South Pacific, documented her experiences in Cambodia. In her writings, Cambodian Glory, she described the traditional Cambodian attire:

The true national dress of Cambodia was the 'langouti', a sort of skirt, like the Javanese sarong, worn by both men and women. The 'sampot', a similar garment, but with one end pulled through between the legs to give the effect of a baggy pair of knickers, is a fashion imported from Siam.

— H.W. Ponder, Cambodian Glory (1936).

In Angkor Empire (1955) by George Benjamin Walker, recorded the origin of the modern sampot, which was compiled from these historian authorities: R. C. Majumdar, Reginald Le May, Kalidas Nag, Horace Geoffrey Quaritch Wales, George Charles Brodrick, Lawrence Palmer Briggs, Cedric Dover, and French scholars of the French School of the Far East:

Her dress is the sampot. Authorities say it is from Siam. Why, no one can guess. Authorities tell us all sorts of curious things on the strength of their knowledge of the ancient texts and the historians' histories. It requires no knowledge of mediaeval Siamese history to see plentiful evidence of the sampot in the bas-reliefs, which preceded Siamese influences by centuries. The sampot is like the Indian lungi or the Malayan sarong; a length of cloth, often gaily coloured, tied around the waist and hanging down like a skirt. Sometimes it is caught up between the legs and fixed behind like a dhoti, in the fashion of the women of Maharashtra.

— George B. Walker, ANGKOR EMPIRE (1955).

== Textiles ==
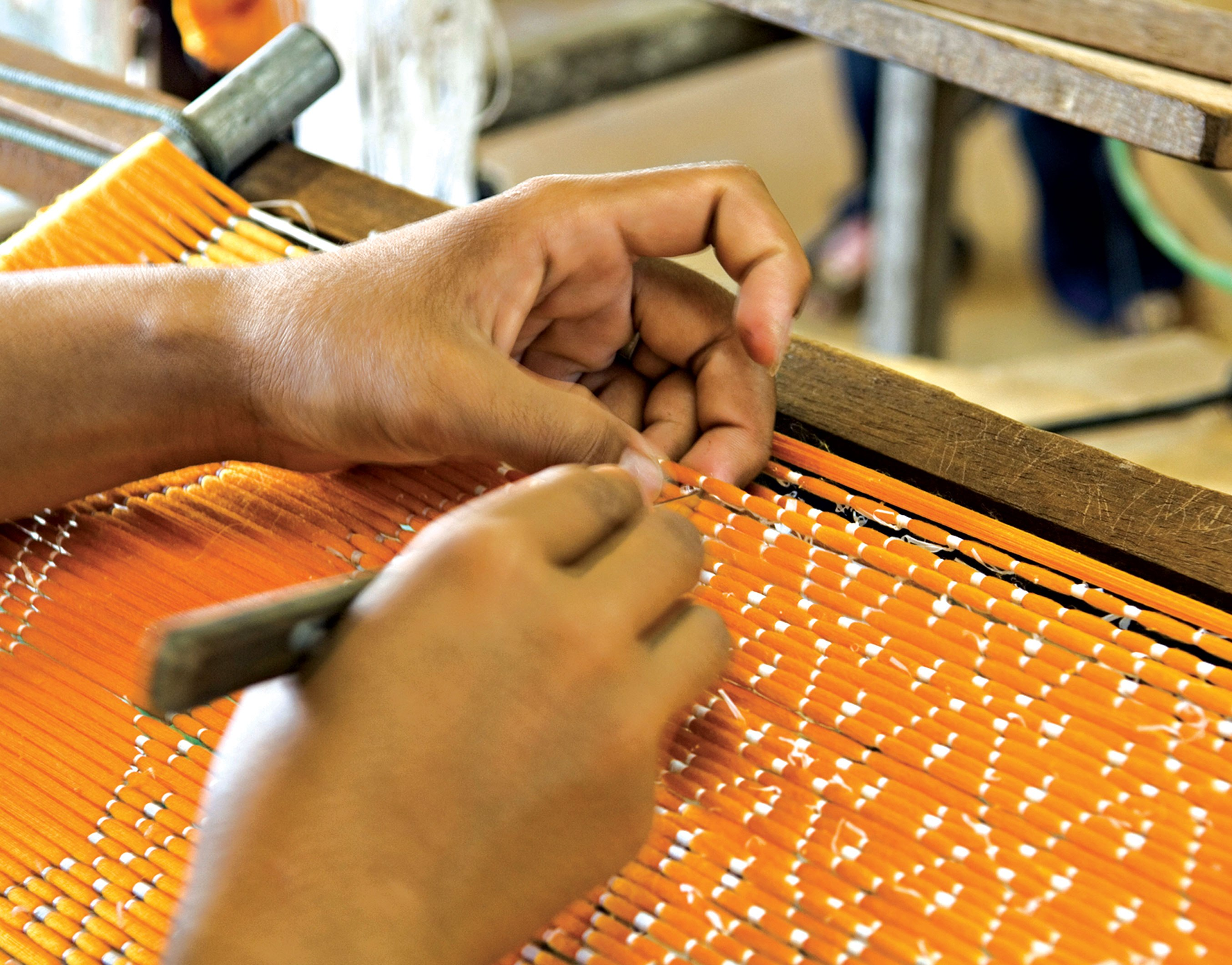
The Khmer chong kiet (ikat) technique.

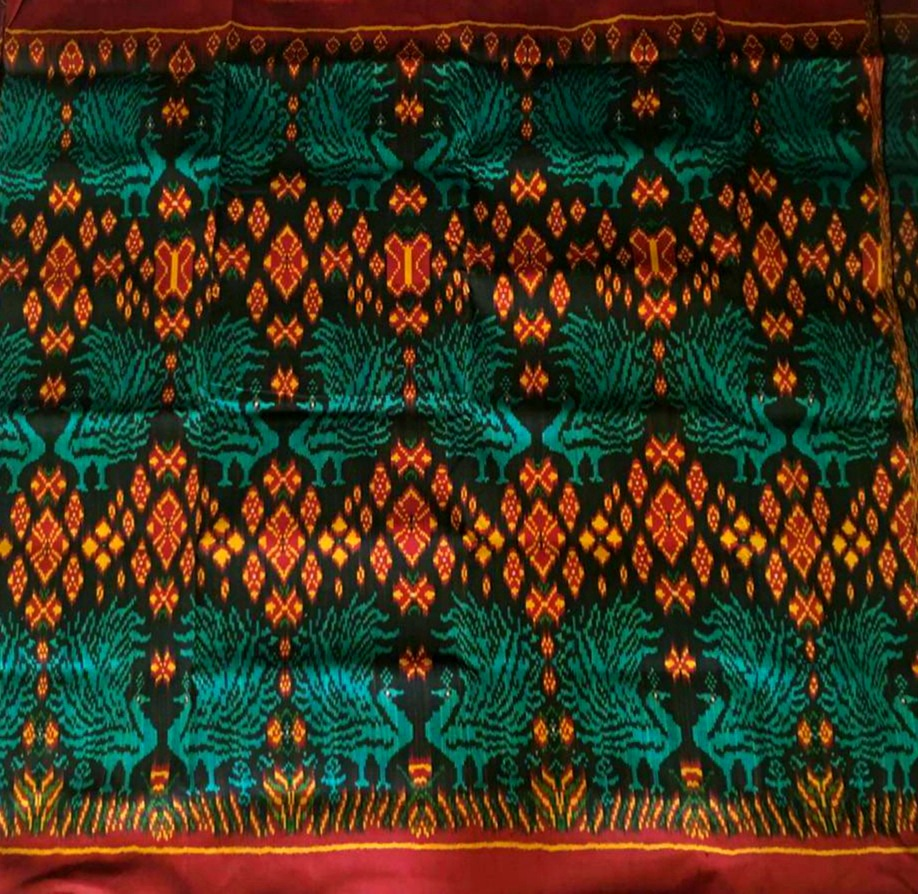
Khmer hol silk fabric.

Chong kiet refers to the Khmer ikat technique one can explain as "tying of partial sections of the weft yarn with fiber for resist dyeing that creates patterns on the yarn before weaving." As a verb, kiet means "tighten, roll up, draw up." In Khmer, chong kiet means "tying strings."

Hol (ហល) is a weft chong kiet silk bearing multi-colored designs. Hol utilizes uneven twill ground weave, yielding single or two-color fabrics produced by weaving three threads so that the "color of one thread dominates on one side of the fabric, while the two others determine the color on the reverse side." The result is a brighter tone one side than the other, while the shade of the hol pattern itself remains consistent. From this comes sampot hol. Khmer people indigenous to eastern present-day Thailand also utilize uneven twill, unlike the Thais, demonstrating a practice predating modern borders. It was common for powerful Siamese officials to request hol silk garments from Khmer weavers in Cambodia. Traditionally, aside from the natural color of the silk, the hol palette consists of the following colors: yellow; indigo; maroon; red; blue for highlights; red "overdyed with indigo" to get purple, and yellow "overdyed with indigo" to get green.

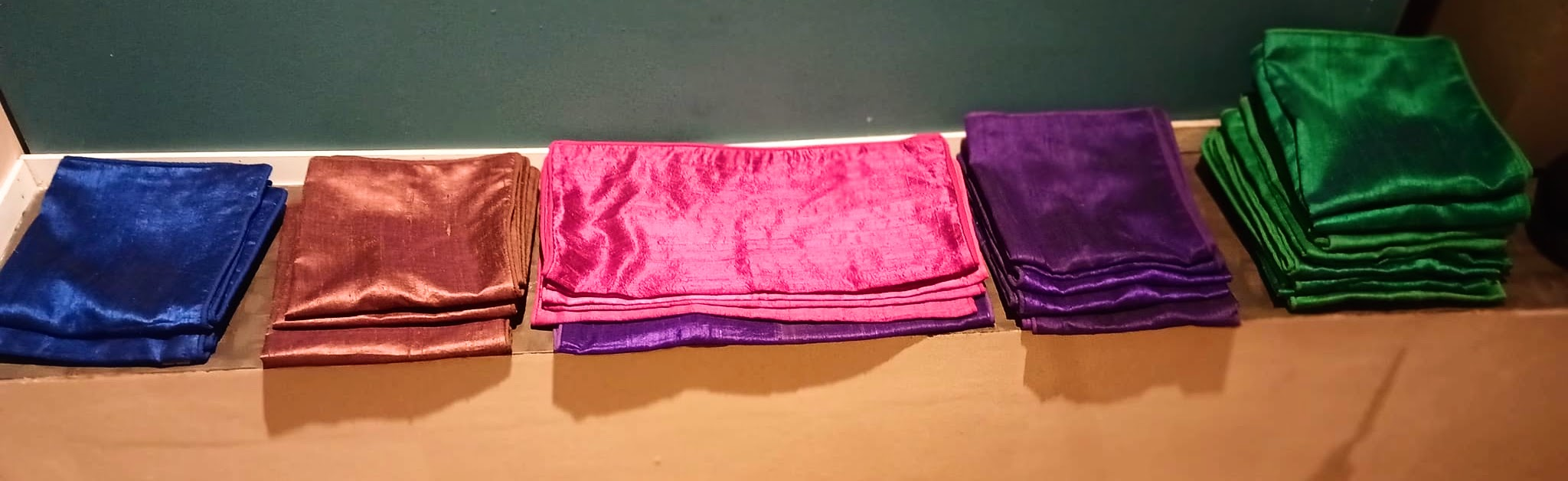
Khmer phamuong silks.

Phamuong សំពត់ផាមួង /pʰaa muəŋ/ are single-colored, weft-faced twill (or taffeta) silks that may utilize contrasting warp and weft colors for a shimmering look, or "shot silk." Woven in plain groundweave, the phamuong is typically unpatterned and hand-produced using a two-framed traditional loom. The etymology of the word comes from Thai in which "pha" originally means "skirt" and "muong" originally refers to the color purple. There are currently 52 colors used in phamuong. The phamuong chorabap is a luxurious fabric using up to 22 needles to create. Phamuong variation are rabak, chorcung, anlounh, kaneiv and bantok. It usually uses floral and geometric motifs. The most valued silk used to create the phamuong is Cambodian yellow silk, known for its fine quality in the region. New designs draw inspiration from ancient patterns on old silk.

== Variations ==
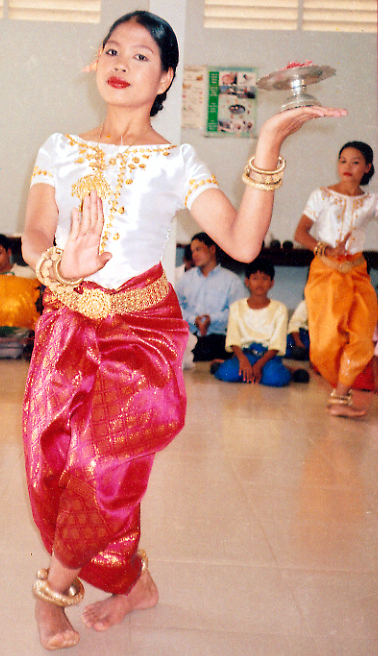
Chong kben robab, as opposed to samloy robab, during rehearsal.

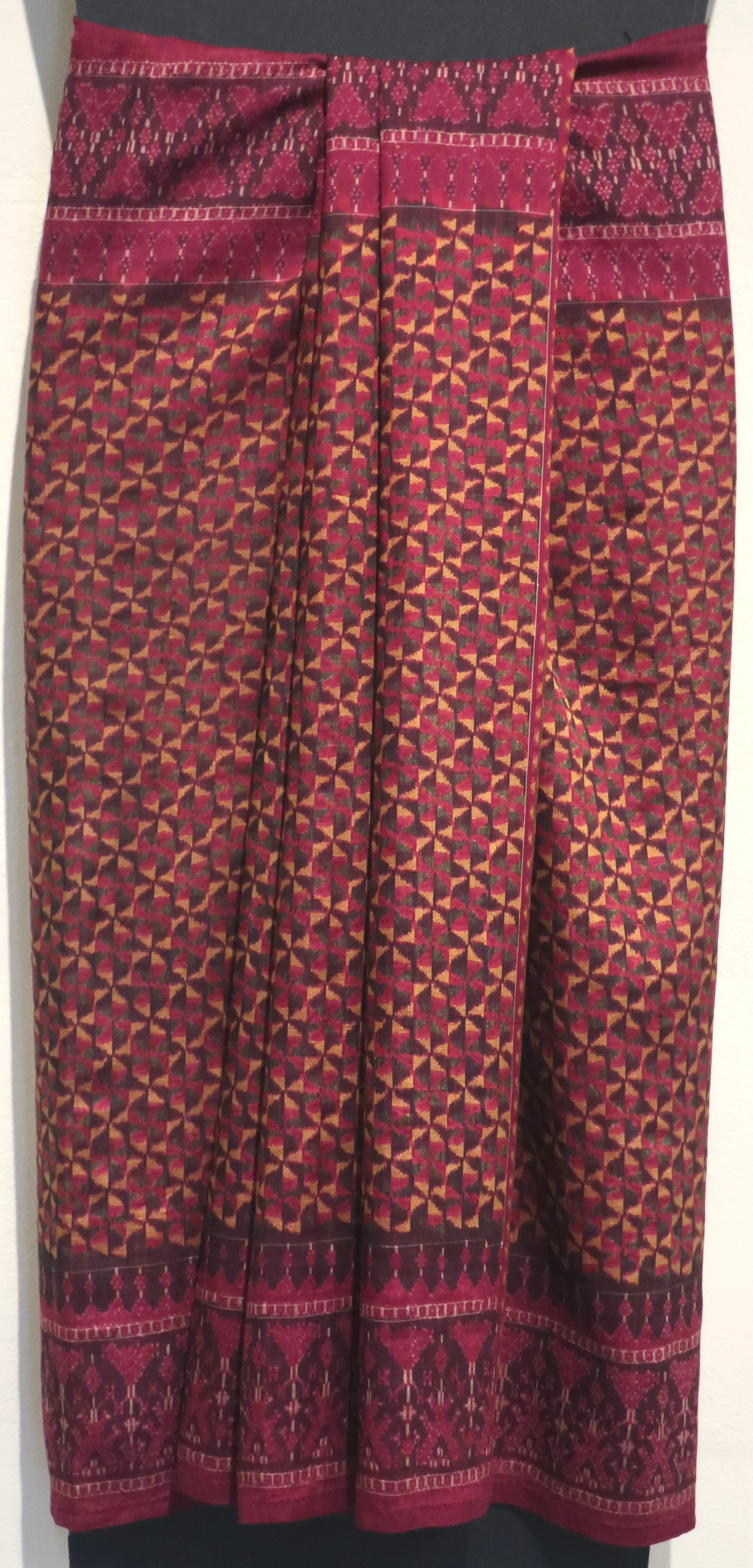
An example of sampot hol, samloy-style.

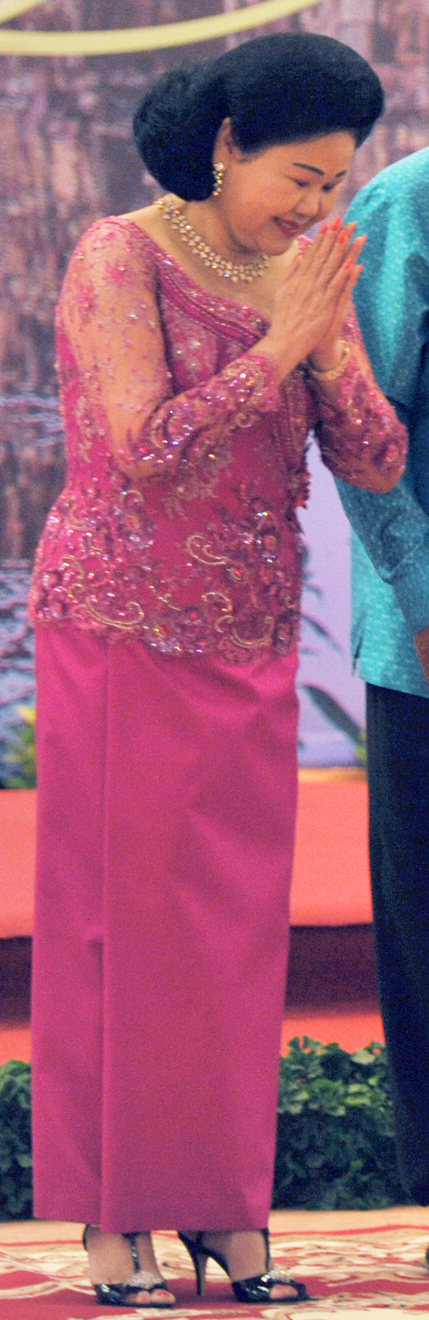
A pink sampot bot (note the long fold down the side).

- Sompot chong kben (Khmer: សំពត់ចងក្បិន) is a unisex garment worn by wrapping it around the waist, stretching it away from the body and twisting the knot. The knot is then pulled between the legs and held by a belt. Scholars conclude it can be contended that the Khmer chong kben corresponds to the dhoti worn in the Indian subcontinent. The sampot chong kben has also been adopted in Thailand and Laos, where it is known as a chong kraben.
- Sampot samloy (Khmer: សំពត់សម្លុយ) is a draped sampot tied in a free-hanging, "wraparound skirt" or "tube skirt" style, as opposed to pants-like chong kben. Sampot samloy is depicted in Khmer sculpture going all the way back to Funan, and often feature pleats and folds.
- Sampot sup (Khmer: សពត់ ស៊ូប) refers to a samloy-style sampot fabricated with darts and a waistband.
- Sampot bot, which translates more or less to "folded skirt," refers to a sampot samloy secured via a long, flat fold along the side. This method is said to have emerged from western influence.
- Sampot hol (textile), សំពត់ហល, is an ikat (or chong Kiet) silk sampot (usually women's) bearing multi-colored designs achieved via resist-dying. The uneven twill groundweave leaves one side of the sampot brighter than the other while the pattern's tone remains consistent. Worn chong kben and samloy style.
- Sampot anlonh (textile), សំពត់អន្លូញ, refers to woven silk skirt cloth with a chequerboard design formed from two-colored weft and warp stripes over an undecorated groundweave, creating stripes along its entirety. It is commonly worn by women in the countryside.
- Sampot rbauk (textile), សំពត់ល្បើក, is a long, silk damask-patterned sampot. Patterns are done in silk or silk-esque thread and described in animal and plant terms, and often worn for formal events.
- Sampot charobab/sarabap (textile), សំពត់ចរបាប់, also known as just sampot robab, is a long, brocaded silk with metallic silver and gold thread featuring pattern and motifs, such as jasmine floral, in different colors than the actual fabric. It is worn by ballerinas in Khmer classical dance, by royalty, and also for weddings or other formal events. Charobab can be worn as samloy robab and in chong kben style. The samloy robab form is often draped in the fashion of sampot sarobap ka'at kbal neak, or "sampot folded like the head of a naga".
- Sampot soeng (textile), សំពត់ស៊ឹង, is a monochromatic skirt with a patterned design along the lower hem. Originally a more popular tradition in Laos, sampot soeng became popular in the 1980s when Cambodians, having emerged from war, purchased the affordable soeng from Laos. Eventually, Cambodians began weaving their own for personal use and to sell.
- Sampot phamuong (textile), សំពត់ផាមួង, is a single-colored, shimmering silk sampot, typically unpatterned, worn both chong kben - by men and women - and samloy style, worn by only women. Sampot phamuong is typically worn for formal events and ceremonies.

== In daily life ==
The sampot is deeply rooted in Cambodian culture. Despite the French bringing a degree of westernisation to the country, Cambodians continued to wear the sampot. Royalty and government officials wore the sampot chang kben with a formal jacket. Cambodians still wear the phamuong sompot chong kben on special occasions today, and rural and poor Khmers still prefer them to western-style clothing for their comfort.

The material used by poor and rural Cambodians is not hand-woven silk but printed batik-patterned cloth imported from Indonesia. It is still popular with both men and women alike and is regarded by the people of Cambodia as their national garment.

== See also ==
- Áo tứ thân
- Longyi
- Lungi
- Malong
- Patadyong
- Sarong
- Sinh
- Cambodian clothing
- Culture of Cambodia
- Sompot Samloy
