= Lunghi =

Lunghi is a surname. Notable people with the surname include:

- Cherie Lunghi (born 1952), British actress
- Denis Lunghi (born 1976), Italian cyclist
- Emilio Lunghi (1886-1925), Italian athlete
- Miguel Lunghi (born 1943), Argentine politician
- Nathalie Lunghi (born 1986), British actress

== See also ==
- Longhi
- Lungi (disambiguation)
