= Pidan (textile) =

Type of silk cloth

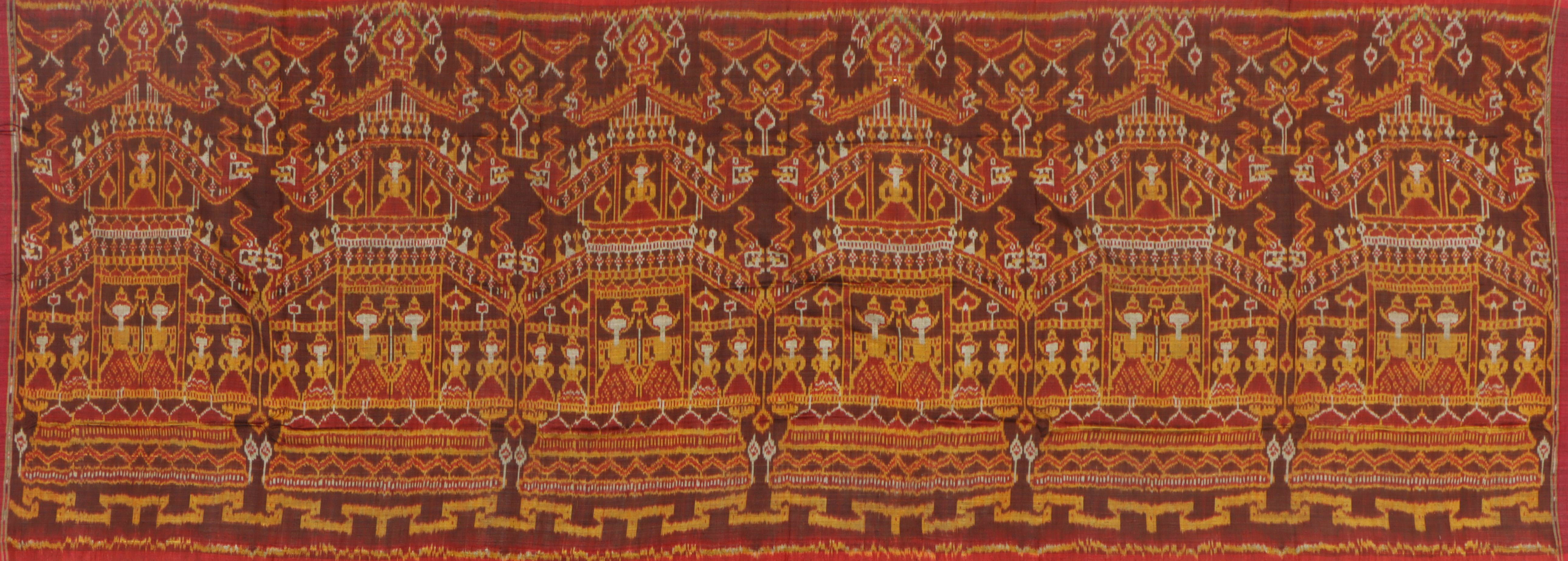
Silk pidan

A pidan is a type of silk cloth used in Cambodian and Khmer weddings, funerals, and Buddhist ceremonies as a canopy or tapestry. Pidan are often decorated with images of wats, nāgas, apsaras, scenes from the life of Buddha, Angkor Wat, animals (especially elephants), and plants.

== Etymology ==
Pidan ពិតាន transliterates as bitan, meaning "extension, curtain, canopy." It is derived from the Sanskrit word vitana, defined as “an awning, canopy or cover.” The Khmer dictionary today defines pidan as ‘ceiling’ or "canopy," generally that of a vihear (Buddhist worship hall).

== History ==
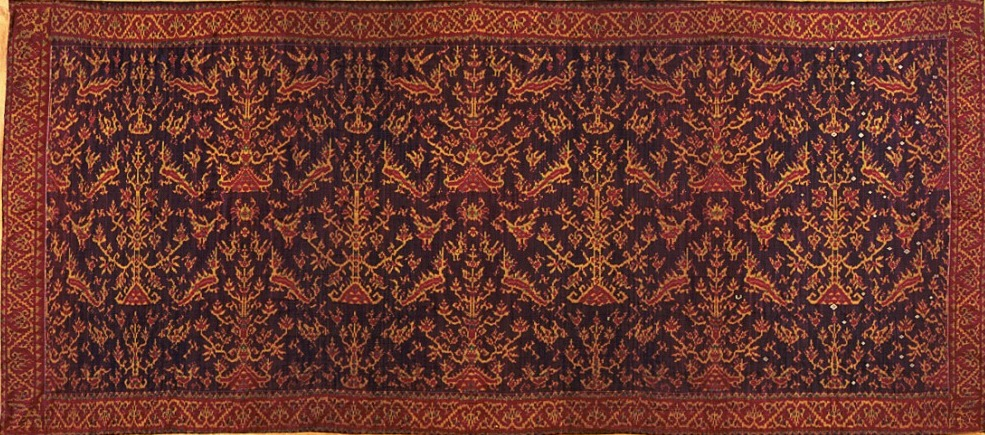
Silk pidan

Inscriptions from the Angkor era reveal a word whose use and description match today’s term pidan, and pidan production was most frequent and plentiful between approximately 1880 and 1930.

In the past, the high-value pidans were commissioned by wealthy donors for the protection of Buddha images in a pagoda, which earned them merit.

Between 1975 and 1979, Pol Pot’s regime banned silk-weaving, including pidan production. A few survivors retained the skills and techniques required. Out of 415, 300+ textile collections from the National Museum had disappeared after the Khmer Rouge were overthrown in 1979.

Japanese org Caring for Young Refugees initiated weaving workshops in Khao-I-Dang refugee camp on the Thai border in 1980. Via the Cambodian division titled Caring for Young Khmer (CYK), a small number of Khmer silk weavers made pidans. In 1991, CYK had come to Cambodia only to realize pidan production was nearly extinct and unknown among weavers. By 2014, CYK had trained 172 weavers.

Since the 1960s, pidan production began satisfying an artistic market and secular purposes.

Women have always dominated the skill of pidan-weaving.

== Production, use, and themes ==
Khmer Pidan.

Pidan rup duk, meaning "pidan in the style of a boat/ship" ពិតានរបេទក, refers to pidans woven with ship motifs.

Pidan rup preah ពិតានរបេប្រា means "pidan in the holy/deity style" and pidan rup prasat ពិតានរបេសាទ is a "pidan in the temple style."

Hol pidan (ហូលពិតាន) is a pidan woven in the chong kiet (ikat) technique from uneven twill groundweave, giving single or two-color fabrics produced by weaving three threads so "color of one thread dominates on one side of the fabric, while the two others determine the color on the reverse side." The result is a brighter tone one side than the other, while the shade of the pattern itself remains consistent.

As pidans are hand-made and take three months to a year to make, they're fairly expensive

Traditionally, pidans are dedicated for holy use. Pidans can function as ‘scenes of paradise’ placed next to the dying.

A less common pidan preah is tiered and suspended above a Buddha statue for protection. These may be adorned with moon and sun icons. Hol pidan may also be hung above the Buddha for protection.

Depictions on silk weft hol are crafted within one and a half meters (just under five feet long) of fabric, or else twice that, the fomer depicting illustrated stories and the latter repeated thematic icons. Elaborate (and likely older) examples bear a single repeat centered between “partial repeats.” Two to four indistinguishable vertical panels may also showcase patterned icons.

=== Buddhist ===
Buddhist-themed pidans presently come in three categories: Jataka tales, especially Vessantara Jātaka; the life of Prince Siddhartha (the future Buddha), and the Three Worlds cosmology depictions. Examples of classic figures are white elephants, horses, the Buddha mounted on a pedestal, a Brahman priest wearing chong kben, and open pagodas with three figures likely representing Prince Vessantara’s family.

One version of Siddhartha-themed pidans is a lone composition of events of Siddhartha’s life in a linear fashion and stylized and flat figures ignoring traditional perspectives. There are Burmese paintings that utilize a similar composition.

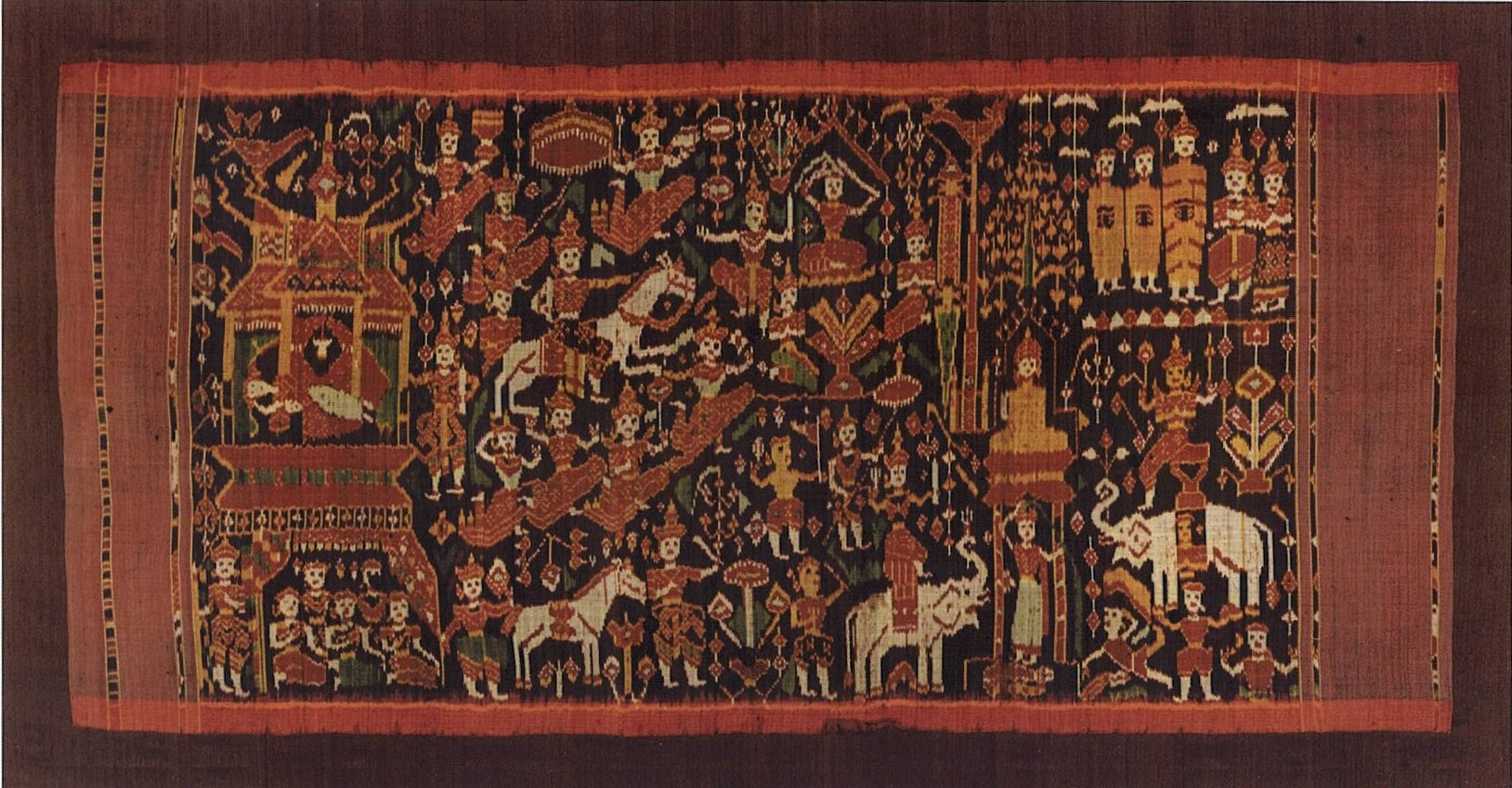
Silk pidan

The second, and also fewer in number, utilize repeats of classic figures symbolizing important events of Siddhartha’s life.

The third category of the three Buddhist themes is Three Worlds ត្រៃភូមិ (or Trey Phum, derived from Sanskrit) cosmology. This consists of upper, middle, and lower primary realm depictions: the Tusita Heaven (where past mothers of Buddhas reside with bodhisattvas) and Tavatimsa Heaven (for gods), a perfected world desired by humans, and the final destination of the condemned, respectfully.

Some examples of popular Trey Phum pidans motifs are Indra (green of color, and parasol in-hand), no-wall religious halls on clouds, apsaras, praying worshippers, seated Buddha, and waving banners (tung rolok) and crocodile banners (tung krapeu) held in beaks, on pagodas, and on poles - all identifying the upper realm. The middle realm's paradise forest Prei Haembopean is inhabited by composite animals and also the kinnari and kinnara, lions, tigers, elephants, horses, and peacocks. Some of these creatures feature pagodas mounted on their backs. Moon and sun icons may also appear.

=== Ship motif ===
Accompanying the antique pidans bearing ship motifs, or pidan rup duk, are figures such as nagas, birds, lobsters, crabs, fish, rays, turtles, sharks, seahorses, elephants (not white), and also crocodile banners and trees-of-life, possibly the only two motifs that also appear in Buddhist themed hol pidan. The three ship categories are 'archaic ships', 'sailing ships' and 'symbolic ships.'

Archaic ships contain a middle superstructure, sometimes even three stories high, that houses human or spirit figures. The ship is adorned with naga finials, and may also contain animals. Land-based religious pavilions may also appear, sometimes in three.

The second category, sailing ships, depict vessels that visited Cambodia over the centuries, including Arab, Chinese, and even European with three sails. Some depict composite ship forms.

The third, symbolic ships, come in two categories: the first depicts ships in pairs of “stacked layers,” the widest layer being the foundation and rows decreasing in width all the way to the naga-headed top. This created a flower mound (phka ben), or sometimes a stupa. The second symbolizes a model ship, the motif either an incense holder or banana tree trunk. Both may support pairs of “star-like spot” symbolizing incense or a candle flame.

== Pidans today ==
Pidan over reproduced Durga image at Sambor Prei Kuk.

=== Introduction of blue ===
Soft blue hues were welcomed to hol pidan production by Japanese NGO Caring for Young Khmer (CYK), which are distinct from orange, brown, and red tones common in hol pidan.

The new indigo hues produced a 2014 pidan called 'Wave Pattern.' Weaver Seam Soma created an abstract pidan with flowing indigo tones zig-zagging like water across the silk's length.

=== Exhibits and continued production ===
In the 2014 ‘Reviving Pidan’ exhibit, Sueun Serynoch presented a Buddhist Prince Siddhartha-themed pidan in gold, beige, and radiant burgundy dominated by a front and center religious pavilion. The structure is accompanied by a cheering audience, two horse-riders, and two elephants. The same exhibit saw weaver Tampo’s pidan that featured nagas and numerous Cambodian animals on soft gold against bold purple with splashes of green and sky blue.

Weaver Pech Kim wove a deep and tightly-pattern hol pidan exhibited in 2016 that appears abstract but reveals a repetition of ritual items, such as incense and candles. Also exhibited in 2016, Soung Mech’s pidan portraying the birth of the Buddha with servants and gods in bright clothes. The Buddha, left arm raised, has lotus flower-shaped footprints, and the scene repeats five times.

In 2010, 2014, and 2016, the National Museum hosted hol pidan exhibits called ‘Hol Pidan Khmer,’ 'Revitalizing Khmer Treasure – Pidan: Pictorial Ikat Silk,' and ‘Khmer Tradition of Weaving the Hol Pidan Khmer: Conservation and development,’ respectively.

A hol pidan exhibit called 'Hol Pidan Khmer: Evolution and Challenges' was held at the National Museum of Cambodia in 2024.

In 2014, Ms. Harumi Sekiguchi of CYK donated 25 hol pidan to the National Museum of Cambodia. In 2024, villagers of Prey Kabbas (Takéo province) released three hol pidan to Siem Reap Province’s Mekong-Ganga Cooperation Asian Traditional Textiles Museum.

In 2025, CYK once again gave the Cambodian Ministry of Culture and Fine Arts more than 40 pieces of hol pidan.

== Gallery ==
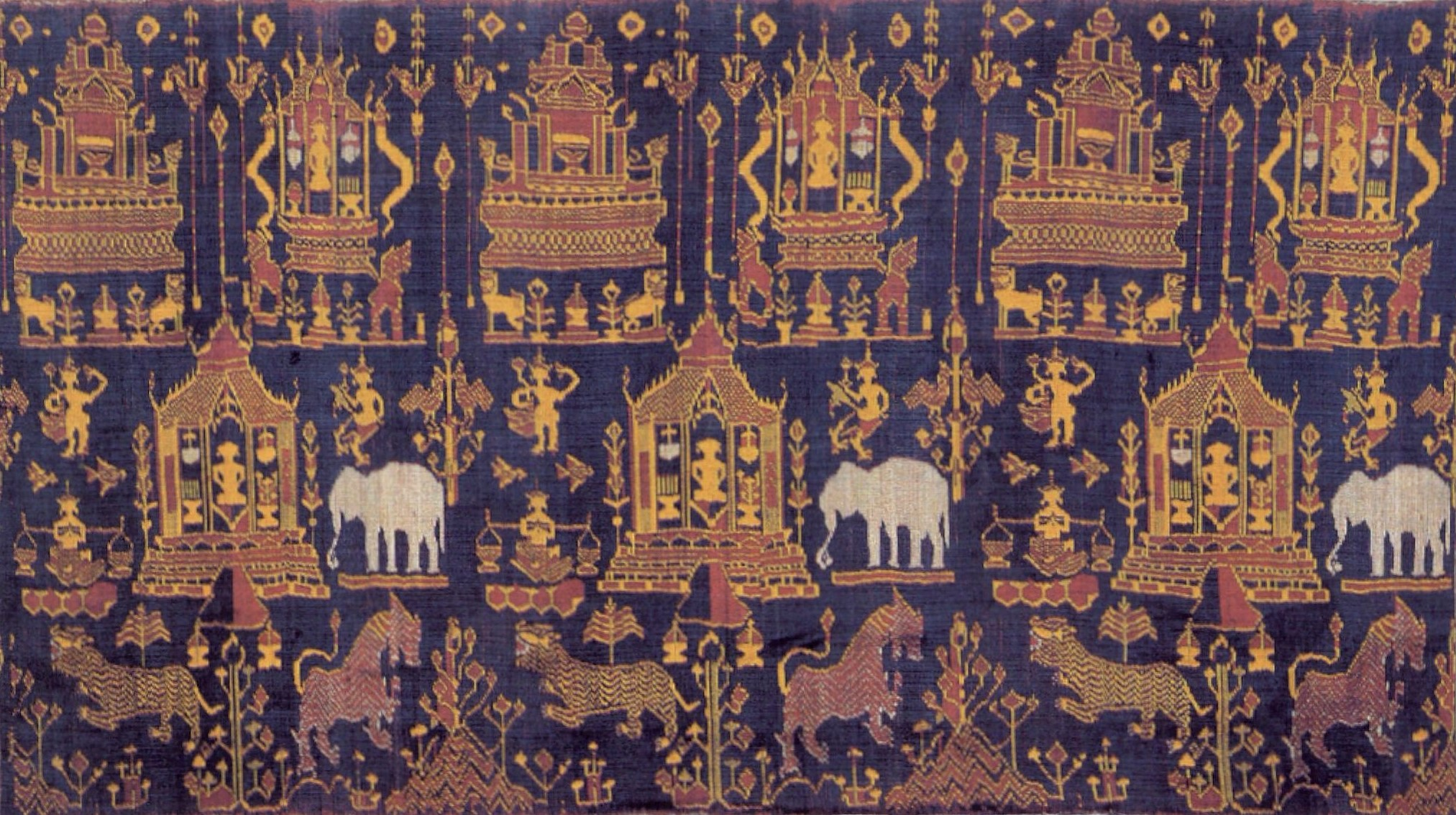
Khmer silk pidan.

Early 20th-century horizontal Khmer silk hol pidan.
