= Longhi =

Longhi is an Italian surname. Notable people with the name include:

== Arts ==
- Alessandro Longhi (1733–1813), painter
- Barbara Longhi (1552–1638), painter, daughter of Luca
- Giuseppe Longhi (1766–1831), Italian printmaker and writer
- Luca Longhi (1507–1580), painter, father of Barbara
- Martino Longhi the Elder (1534–1591), architect
- Martino Longhi the Younger (1602–1660), architect
- Onorio Longhi (1568–1619), architect
- Pietro Longhi (1701–1785 or 1702–1785), painter
- Roberto Longhi (1890–1970), Italian academic and art historian

== Sport ==
- Alessandro Longhi (footballer) (born 1989), Italian footballer who plays for Serie B team Padova
- Damiano Longhi (born 1966), Italian footballer
- Jhonatan Longhi (born 1988), Brazilian skier

== Other fields ==
- Marco Longhi (born 1967), British politician, was MP for Dudley North 2019–2024

== See also ==
- Fondazione Roberto Longhi, Via Benedetto Fortini, Florence, is an institute established by Italian scholar Roberto Longhi, who in 1971 left his library, photo library and collection of art "for the benefit of future generations"
- Lunghi, an alternate spelling of the name Longhi
- Anigre, a type of wood with a common name of Longhi
