= Lungi (disambiguation) =

A lungi is a type of sarong.

Lungi may also refer to:

== People ==
- Lungi Ngidi (born 1996), South African cricketer
- Lungi Mnganga-Gcabashe, South African politician

== Other uses ==
- Lungi, Sierra Leone, a town
  - Lungi International Airport, in Lungi, Sierra Leone
- Lungi (film), a 2019 Indian Kannada romantic film by Arjun Lewis
- "Lungi Dance", a song by Yo Yo Honey Singh from the 2013 Indian film Chennai Express

== See also ==
- Lunga (disambiguation)
- Longyi, a hip-wrap worn in Myanmar
