= Sompot chong kben =

Wrapped and draped pants of Southeast Asia

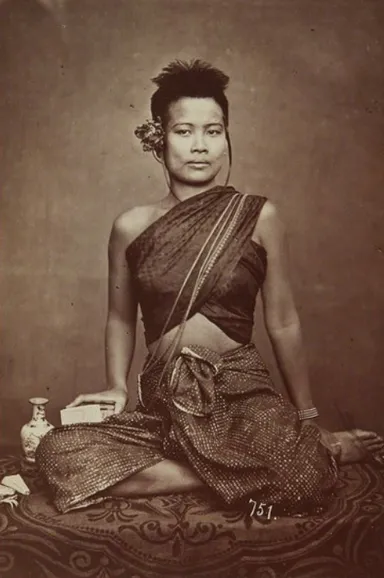
Khmer ballerina Neang Sok (also "Mi Soc") in a sampot chong kben for Émile Gsell, 1860s.

Sompot chong kben (Khmer: សំពត់ចងក្បិន, sâmpót châng kbĕn [sɑmput cɑːŋ kɓən]) is a unisex lower-body wraparound garment. It originated in ancient Cambodia and was later adopted in neighbouring countries including Laos and Thailand, where it is known as chong kraben (โจงกระเบน) and commonly worn by women, particularly those of middle to high socio-economic status.

== Etymology ==
Sompot chong kben (សំពត់ចងក្បិន) combines three Khmer words: សំពត់ (/sɑmpʊət/, sampot), a long, rectangular cloth worn around the lower body; ចង (/cɑɑŋ/, chang), refers to the part of the cloth that's twisted into a bunch; and ក្បិន (/kbən/, kben), to the bunch's role in concealing "private parts". Chong kraben (โจงกระเบน) is used among Thai people and derived from these Khmer words.

== History ==
According to scholars, one can contend that the Khmer chong kben corresponds to the Indian dhoti.

Different styles of chong kben are apparent on Ankorian bas-reliefs. The garment's end panels can present as follows: rolled into a bunch, pulled through the legs, and then secured in the back waistband, or with a belt; deities and kings present a style that entails pulling one front end to the back as the other end drapes the front with the tip secured in the waist-area, creating a pocketfold; knotting the chong kben at the waist with one end hanging front and center and the other pulled back through the legs and slid under the fabric to hang in the center, and a minimal chong kben resembling a loincloth, carved onto “austerely-garbed Brahman priests,” laborers, soldiers, slaves from the mountains, and prisoners of war in bas-reliefs. An exuberant version, or “flared” chong kben, is shown on protagonists of the Mahabharata-epic bas-reliefs, as well as high-ranking soldiers and warrior kings.

By the 17th century, the royal court of Siam had also adopted the sampot chong kben. In 1856, Siamese King Mongkut gifted US President Franklin Pierce four Khmer silk garments. Three were woven silk sampot chong kben in hol pattern, a textile achieved from the distinct, sophisticated Khmer uneven twill groundweave.

== Gallery ==
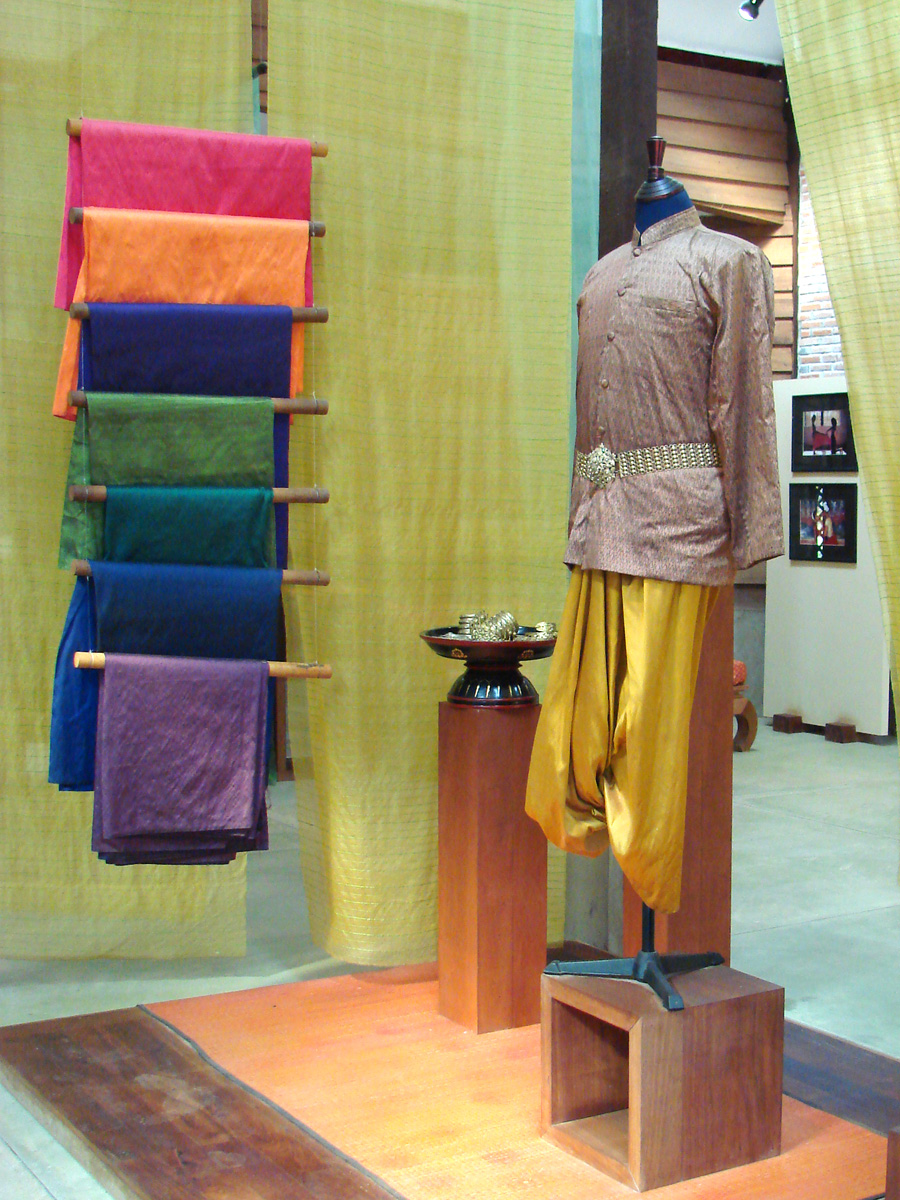
Sompot Chong Kben, Centre national de la soie des Artisans d'Angkor

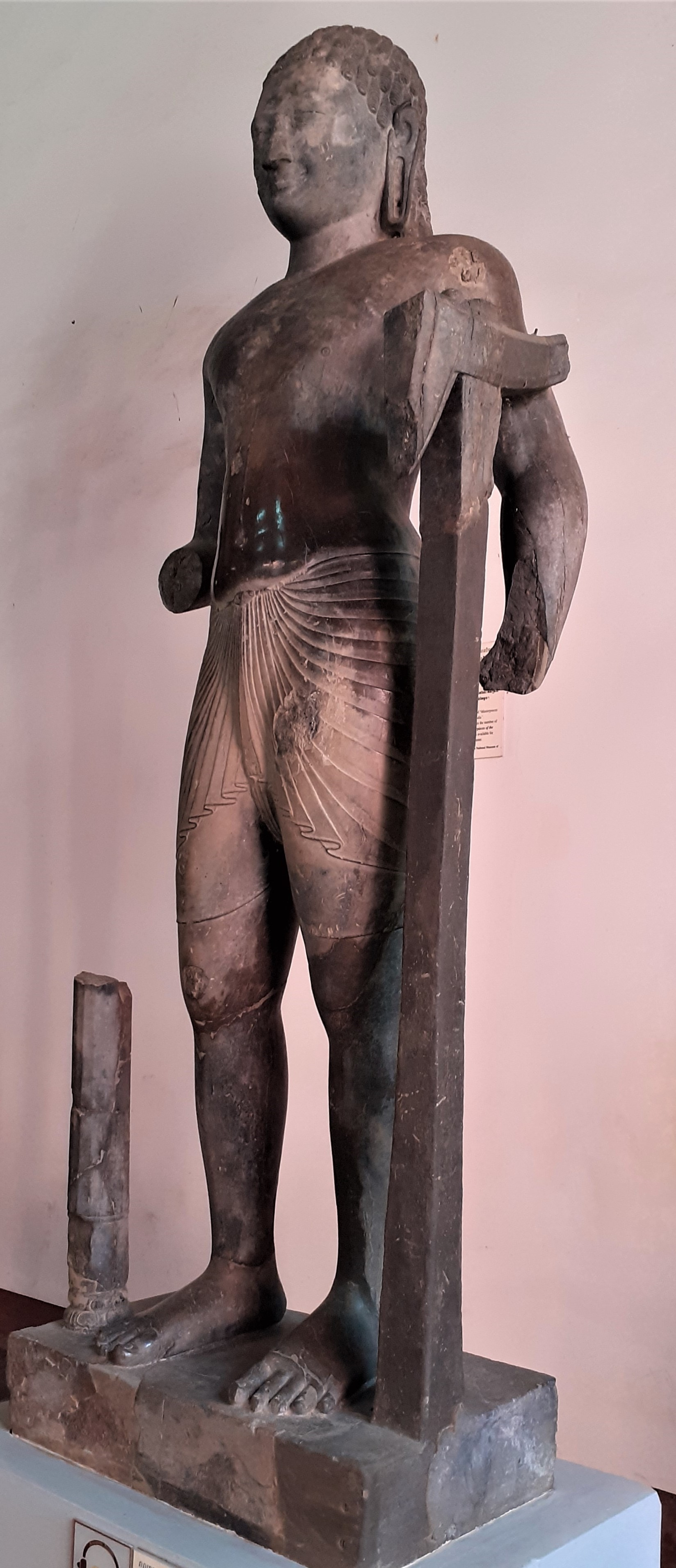
6th century Khmer depiction of Balarama wearing sompot chong kben from Phnom Da temple, Angkor Borei, Takeo, Cambodia. Now exhibits in National Museum of Cambodia.

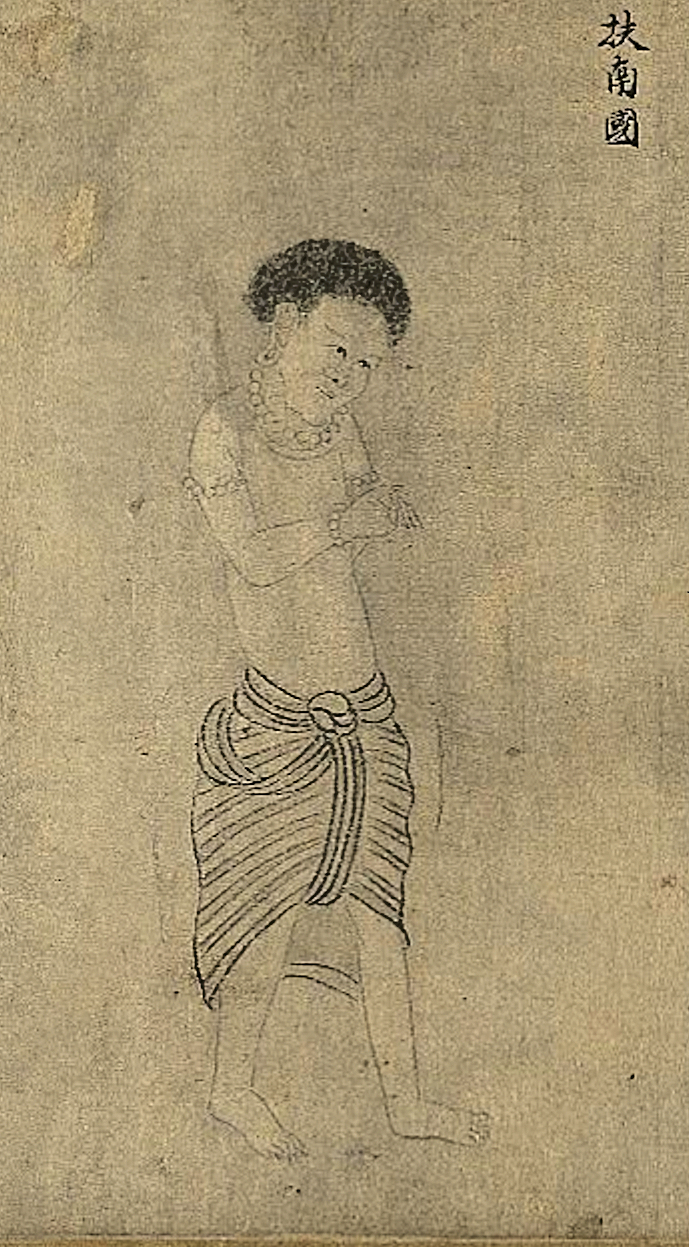
Envoy of Funan to the Liang dynasty wearing a sampot chong kben by painter Gu Deqian of the Southern Tang dynasty (937–976 CE).

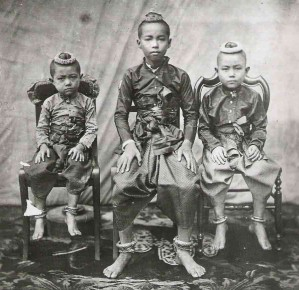
Photograph of Prince Chulalongkorn (Rama V) and his two younger brothers wearing chong kraben in 1851

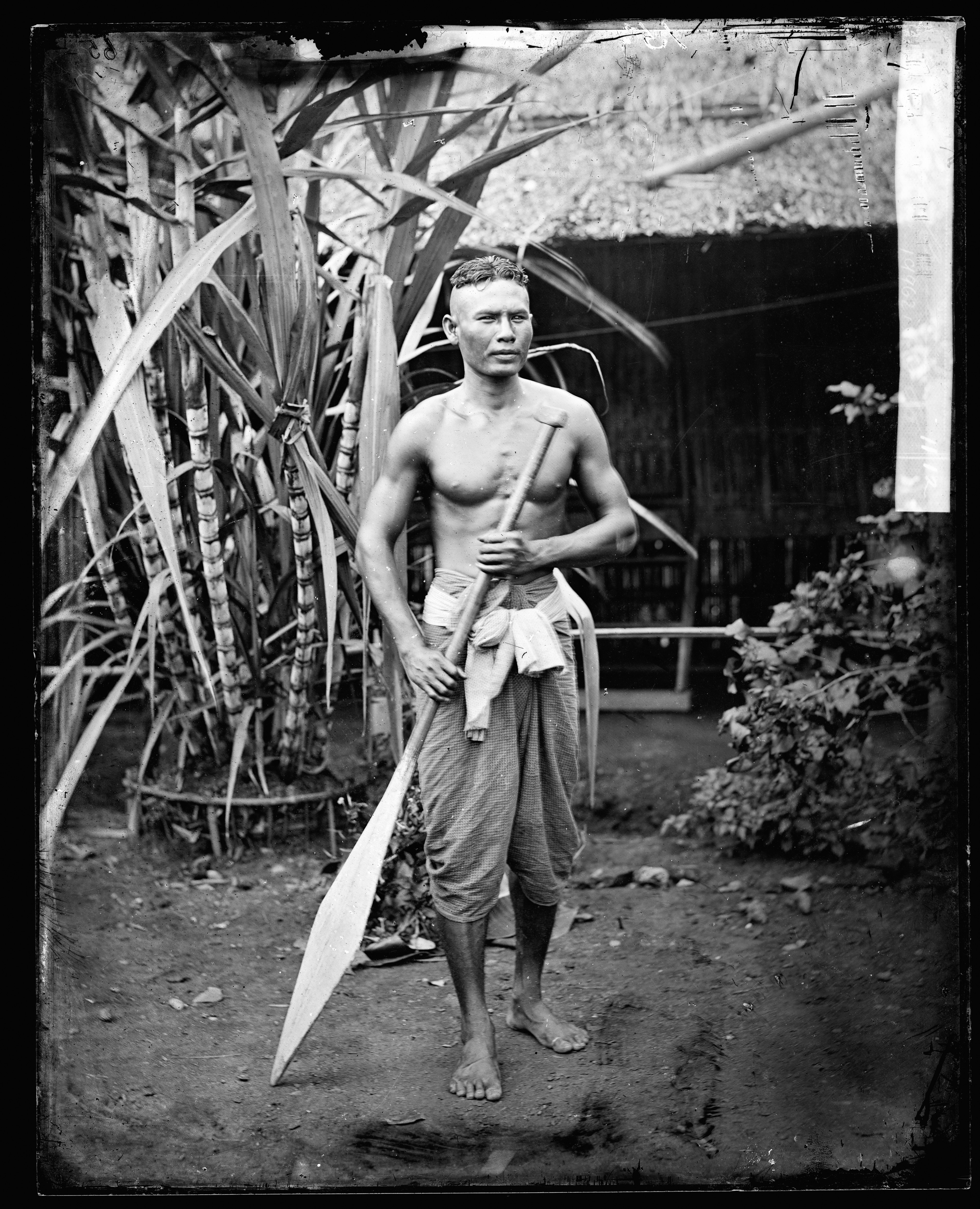
Photograph of a 19th-century Siamese boatman, photographed by John Thomson

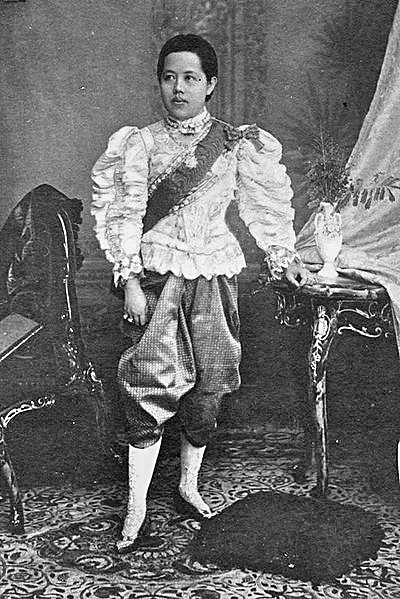
Photograph of Queen Saovabha Phongsri, principal consort to King Chulalongkorn

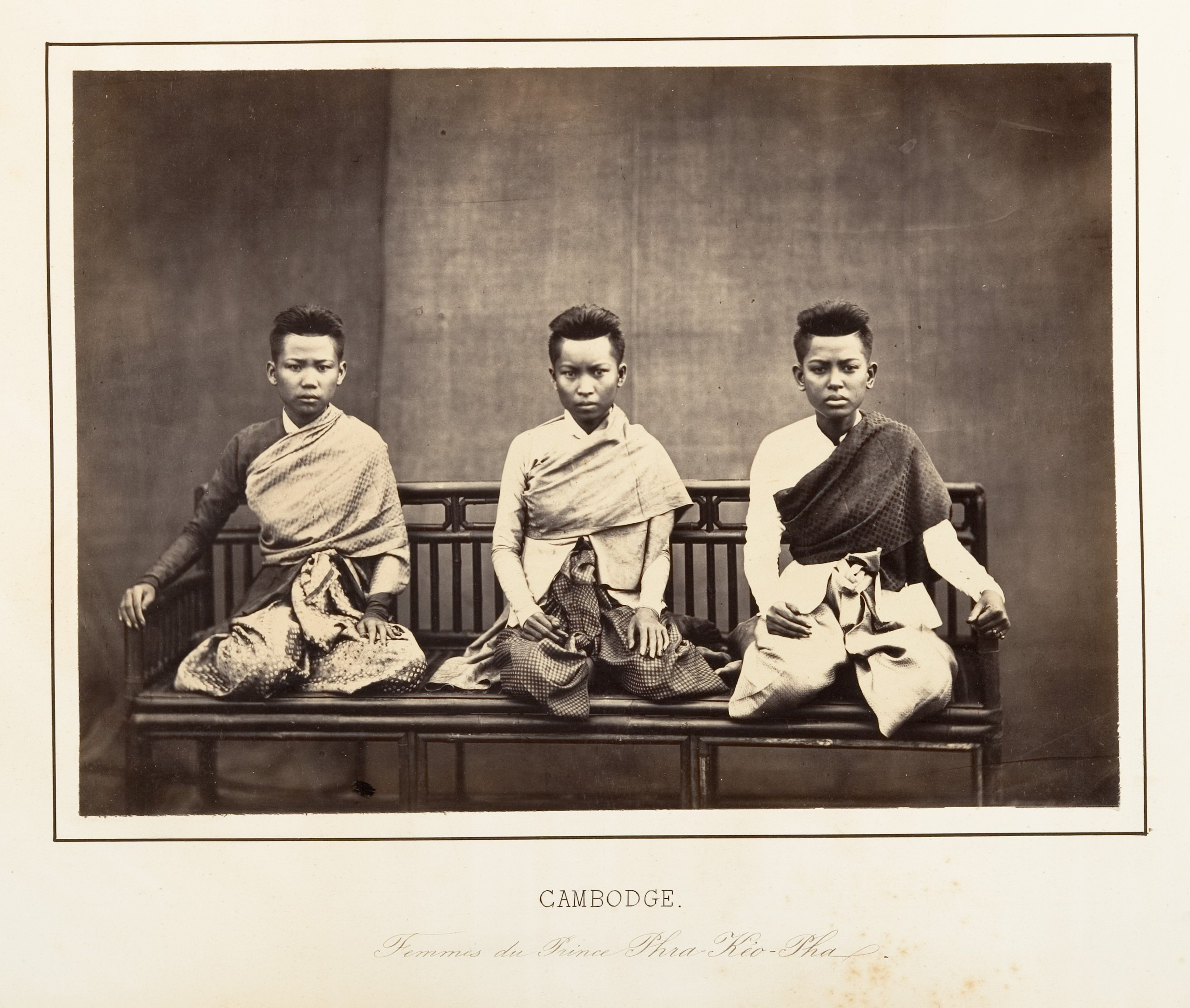
Khmer royal ladies wearing sompot chong kben and sbai in the mid-1800s.

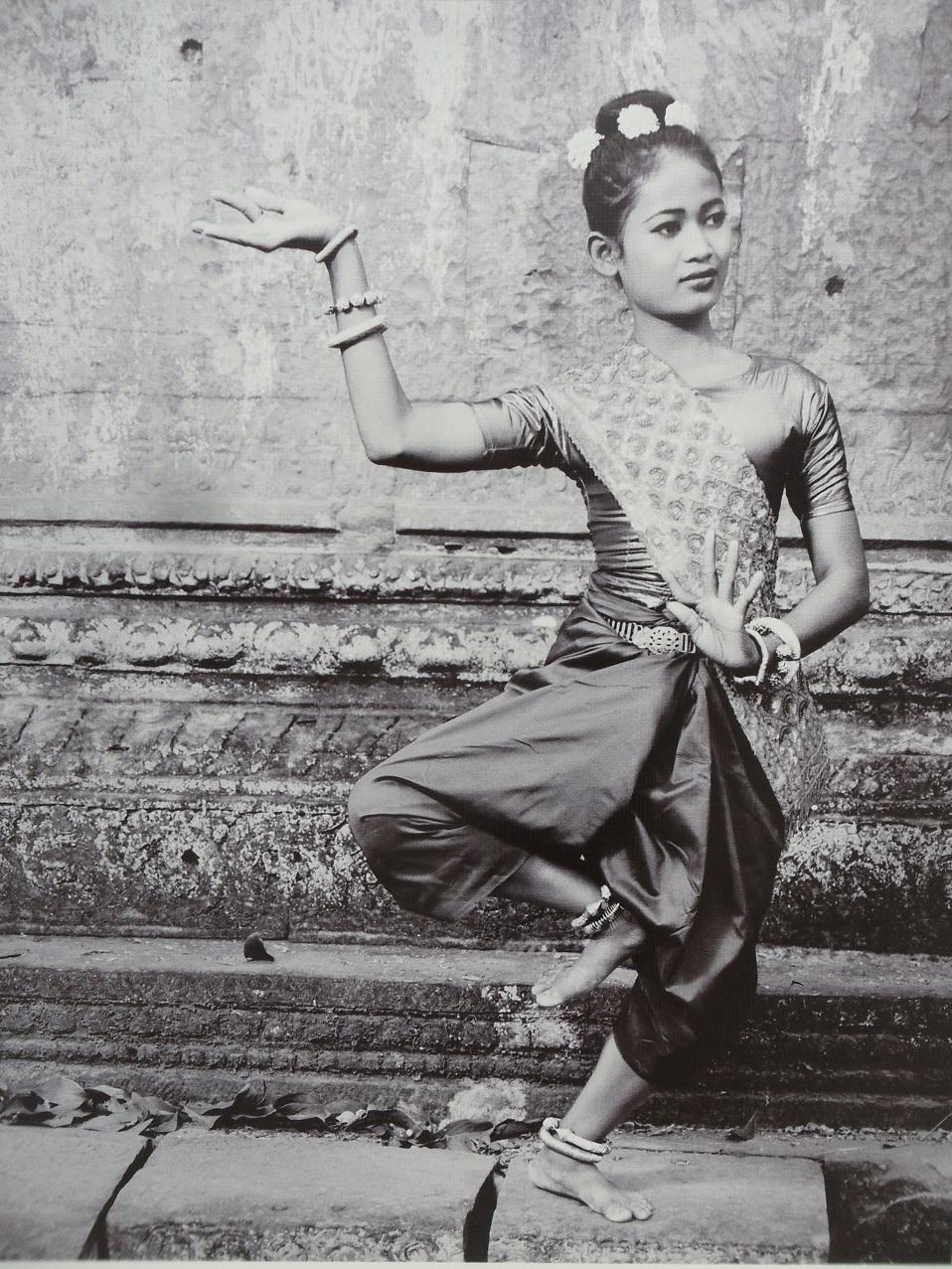
Khmer woman wearing sompot chong kben

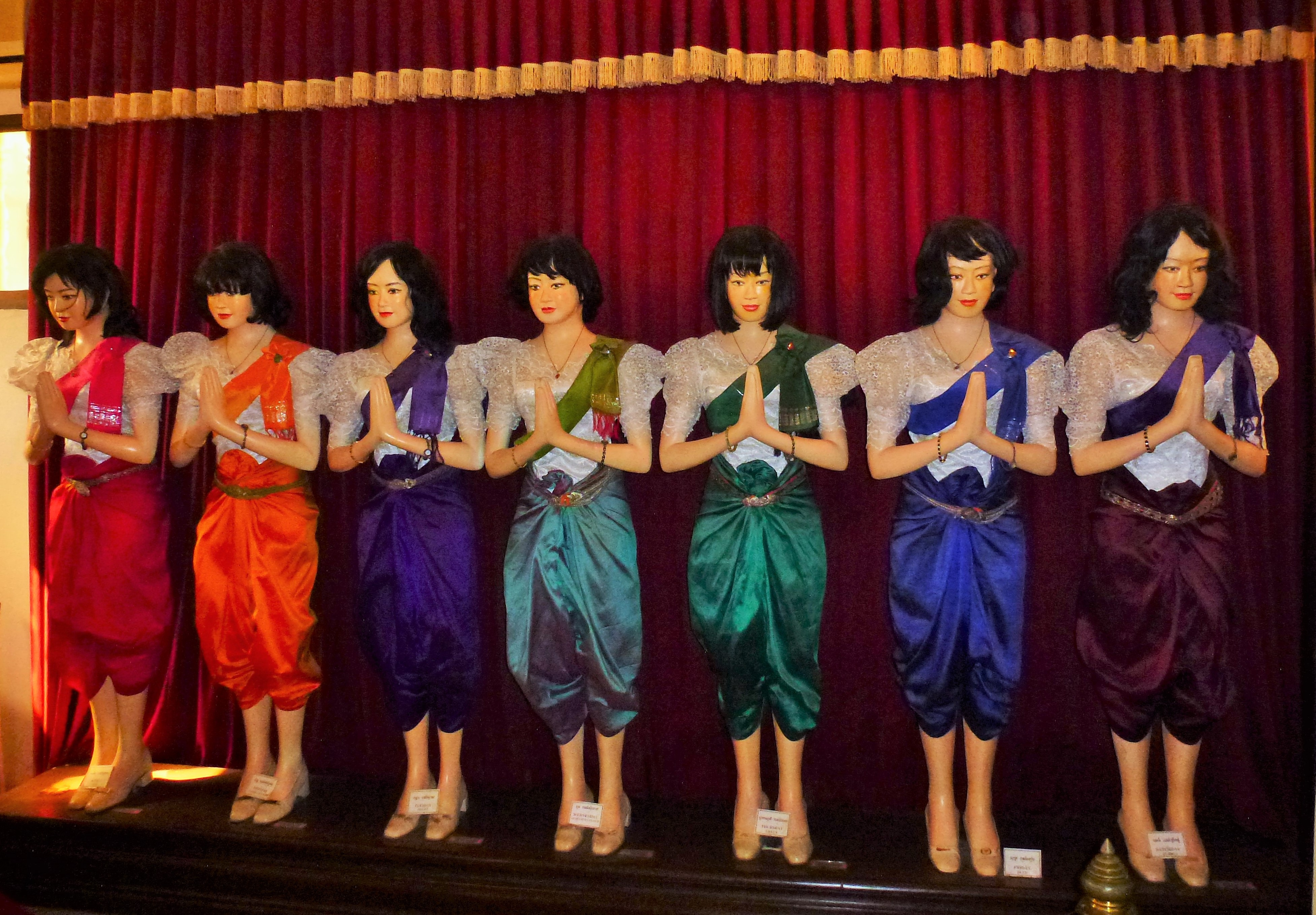
Mannequins wearing sompot chong kben at the Royal Palace of Cambodia

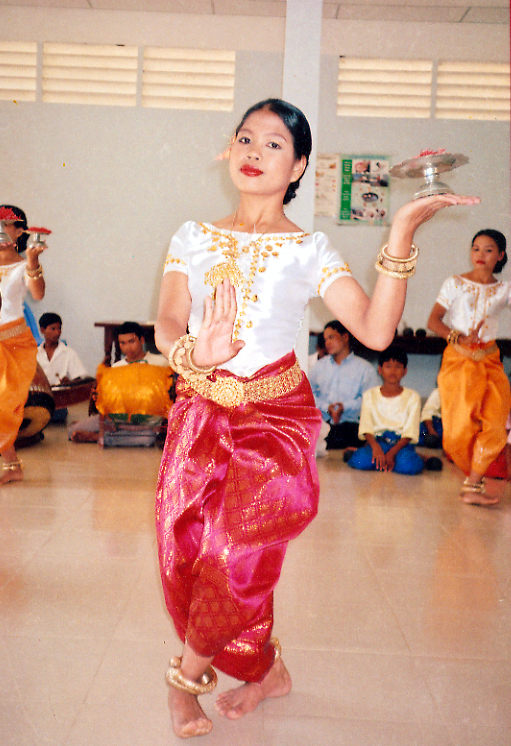
A Khmer traditional dancer in sompot chong kben

== See also ==
- Dhoti
- Sampot
- Sampot chang samluy
- Khmer traditional clothing
- Traditional Thai clothing
