= Khmer traditional clothing =

Traditional clothing of the Khmer people

Khmer traditional clothing refers to the traditional styles of dress worn by the Khmer people throughout history. Tracing their origins back to the early Common Era, the customary styles of dress worn by Khmer people predate the indianization of Southeast Asia. The evolution of these clothing customs can be traced through archaeological artifacts from the 6th century to the post-Angkorian period, evolving from the simple pre-Angkorian sampot to vibrant and intricately embroidered silk garments.

== Bottoms ==
Historically the sampot (សំពត់, sâmpǒt), dates back to the Funan era, in which a king, in response to Chinese envoys, ordered his subjects to cover themselves.

=== Sampot tep apsara ===
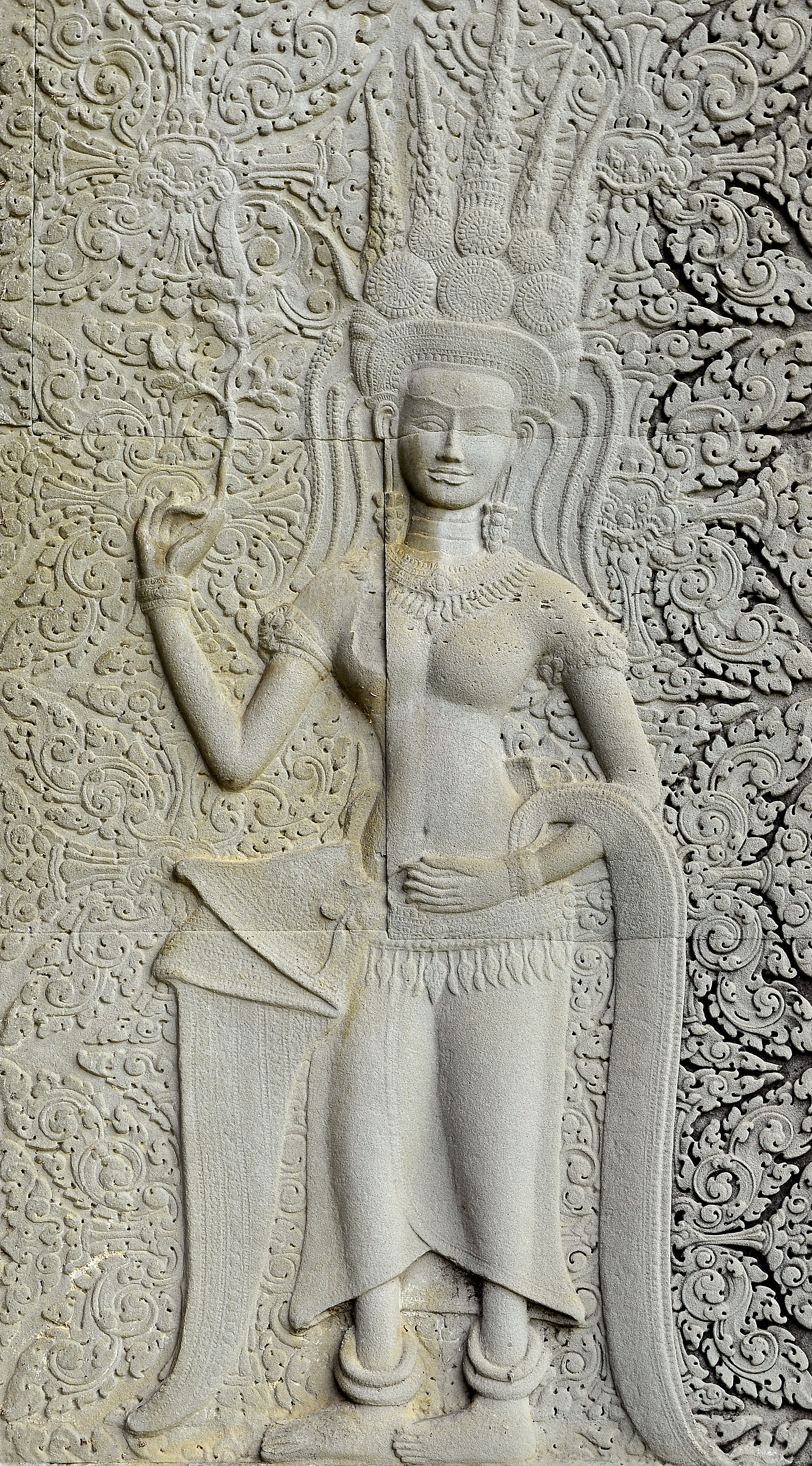
Apsara dressed in an Angkorian-style sampot cloth.

Sampot tep apsara (Khmer: សំពត់ទេពអប្សរា, sâmpǒt tep ăpsăra), is a type of sampot from the Khmer Empire era associated with courtly apsaras. Its depiction can still be seen on the bas-reliefs of Angkor Wat. Generally, the sampot tep apsara is both knotted at the waist and secured with a belt. Long pleats are gathered at the front, running the full length to the wearer's ankles. The sampot tep apsara is actually knotted twice at the waist, one on the left and one on the right; the left knot is longer, while the right knot is more decorative. Today, the sampot tep apsara is worn by traditional dancers in modern Cambodia.

=== Sampot bat ===
Sampot bat (សំពត់បត់, sâmpǒt bǎt), which translates more or less to "folded skirt," refers to a sampot chang samluy secured via a long, flat fold along the side. This method is said to have emerged from western influence.

=== Sampot chang samluy ===
Sampot chang samluy (Khmer: សំពត់ចងសម្លុយ, sâmpǒt châng sâmlŭy), is a draped sampot tied in a free-hanging, "wraparound skirt" or "tube skirt" style, as opposed to pants-like chong kben. Sampot samloy is depicted in Khmer sculpture going all the way back to Funan, and often feature pleats and folds.

=== Sampot chang kben ===
Sampot chang kben

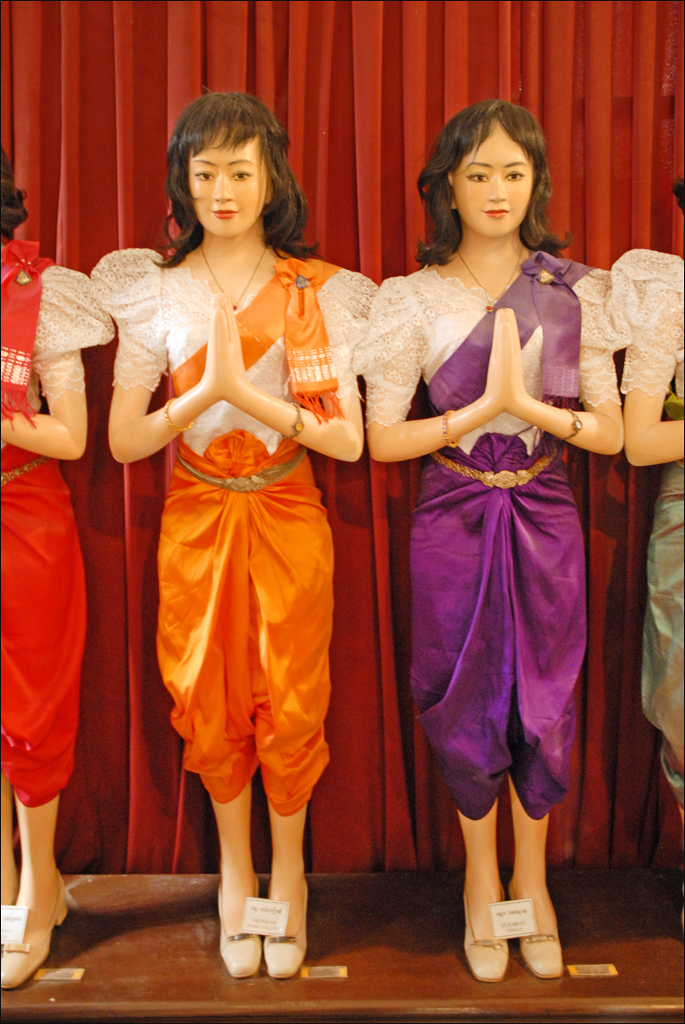
Khmer traditional clothing: late 19th-early 20th century outfit with chang kben.

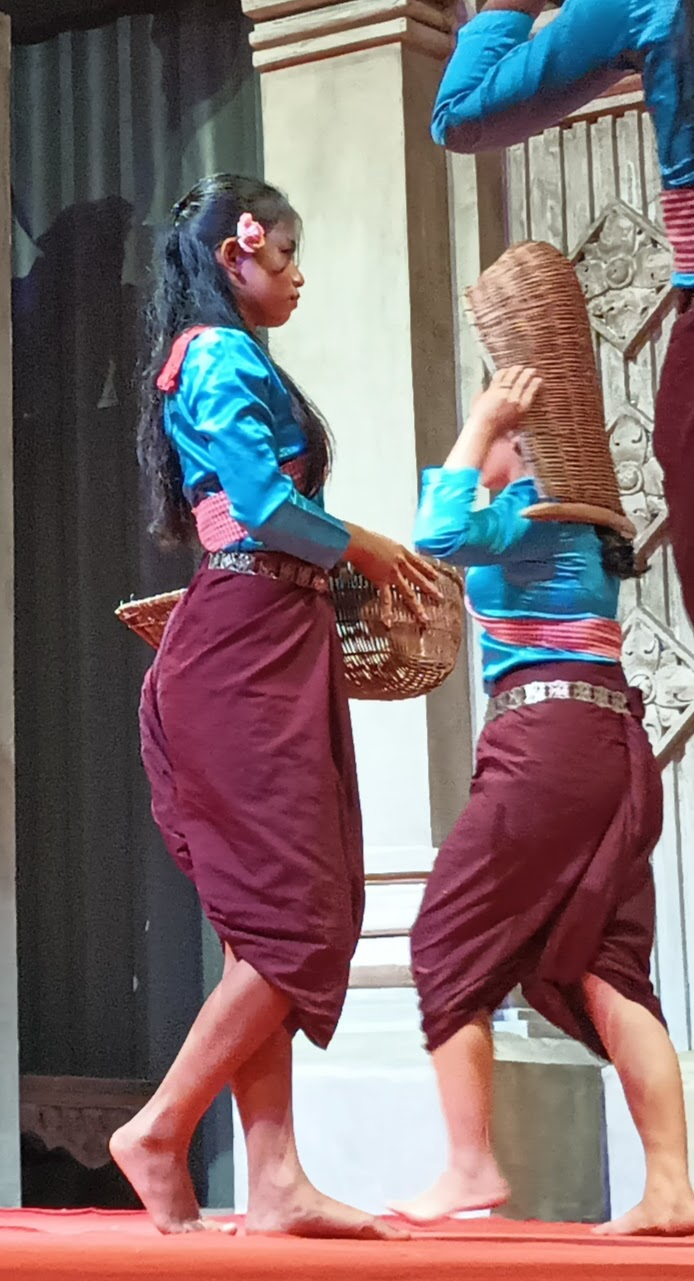
Khmer traditional clothing: folk dancers in Khmer chang kben

Sampot chang kben (Khmer: សំពត់ចងក្បិន, sâmpǒt châng kbĕn), is a unisex garment worn by wrapping it around the waist, stretching it away from the body and twisting the knot. The knot is then pulled between the legs and held by a belt. In Khmer, “chang” refers to the area of cloth that’s twisted into a bunch, and “kben” is the bunch’s role in concealing “private parts.” Scholars conclude it can be contended that the Khmer chong kben corresponds to the dhoti worn in the Indian subcontinent. The sampot chong kben has also been adopted in Thailand and Laos, where it is known as a chong kraben.

=== Sampot sup ===
Sampot sup (Khmer: សពត់ស៊ូប, sâmpǒt sup) refers to a samluy-styled sampot, fabricated with darts and a waistband.

=== Sampot anlunh (textile) ===
Sampot anlunh (Khmer: សំពត់អន្លូញ, sâmpǒt ănlunh), refers to woven silk skirt cloth with a chequerboard design formed from two-colored weft and warp stripes over an undecorated groundweave, creating stripes along its entirety. It is commonly worn by women in the countryside.

=== Sampot charabap (textile) ===
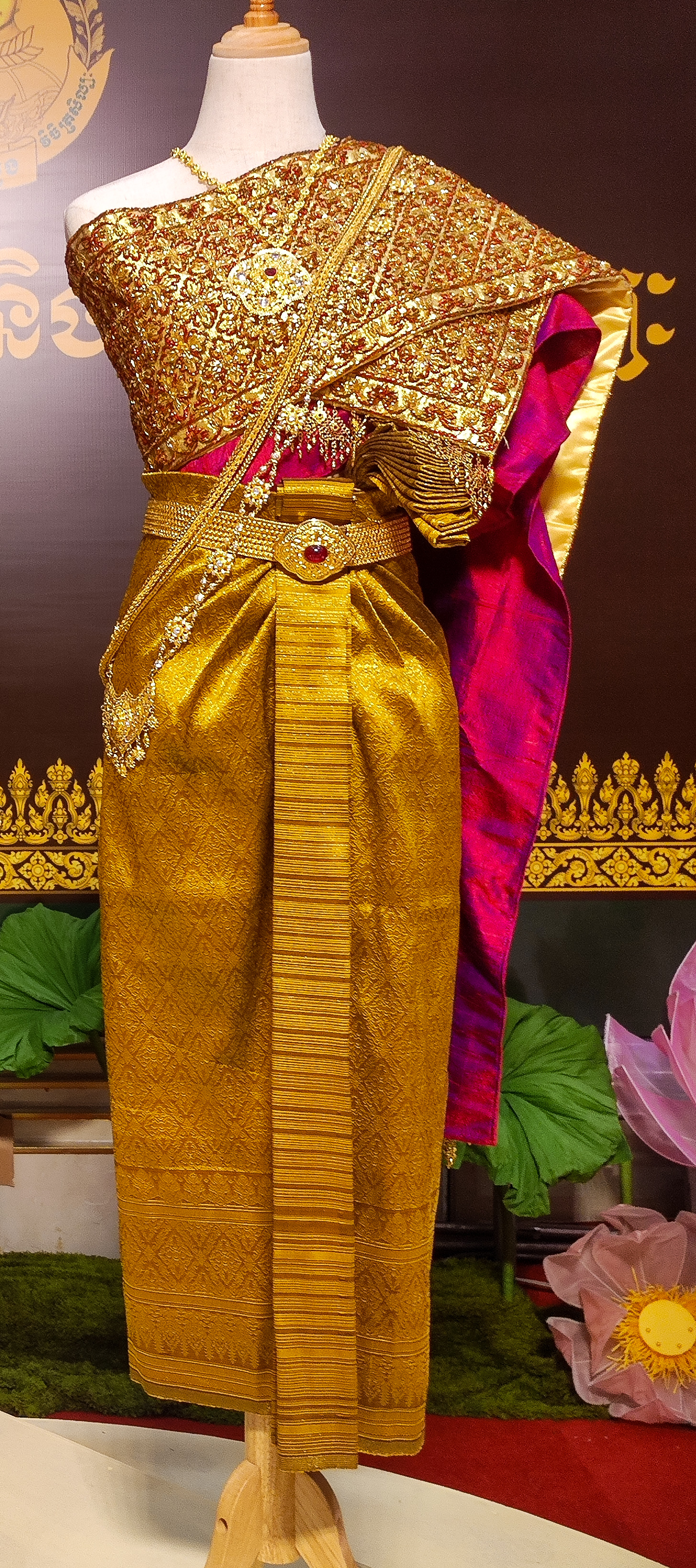
Khmer traditional clothing: samluy rabap as kat kbal niek, or "folded like head of naga", & sbai.

Sampot charabap (Khmer: សំពត់ចរបាប់, sâmpǒt chârăbăp), also formally spelled sarăbăp, or just sampot rabap, is a long, brocaded silk with metallic silver and gold thread featuring pattern and motifs, such as jasmine floral, in different colors than the actual fabric. The term comes from the Persian phrase zar baft (زربافت) which describes "cloth woven with gold thread." It is worn by ballerinas in Khmer classical dance, by royalty, and also for weddings or other formal events. Charobab can be worn as samloy robab and in chong kben style. The samloy robab form is often draped as ka'at kbal neak, or "folded like a naga head".

=== Sampot lbaeuk (textile) ===
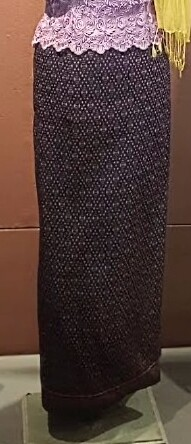
Khmer traditional clothing: sampot lbaeuk.

Sampot lbaeuk (Khmer: សំពត់ល្បើក, sâmpǒt lbaeuk), is a long, silk damask-patterned sampot. Patterns are done in silk or silk-esque thread and described in animal and plant terms, and often worn for formal events.

=== Sampot sueng (textile) ===
Sampot sueng (Khmer: សំពត់ស៊ឹង, sâmpǒt suĕng), is a monochromatic skirt with a patterned design along the lower hem. Originally a more popular tradition in Laos, sampot soeng became popular in the 1980s when Cambodians, having emerged from war, purchased the affordable soeng from Laos. Eventually, Cambodians began weaving their own for personal use and to sell.

== Tops ==
=== Aw chang pong ===
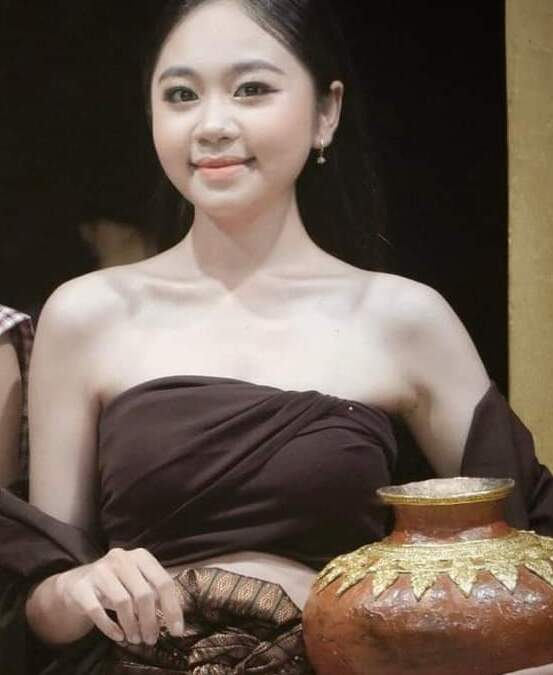
Khmer traditional clothing: av chang pong.

Aw chang pong (Khmer: អាវចងពង់, aw châng pǒng), refers to a fabric that passes over the underarms and “is tied in front and at the chest.” The centuries-old garment is still worn today, particularly in the countryside.

=== Aw tronum ===
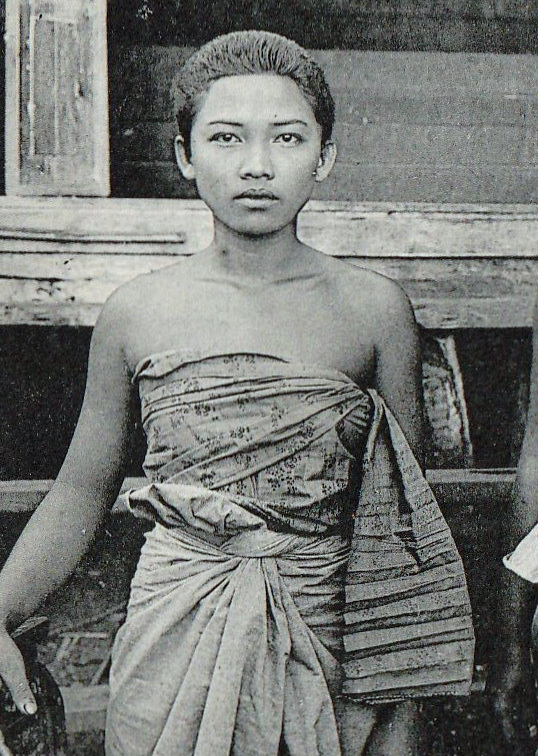
Khmer traditional clothing: aw tronum worn with a sampot chang kben, late 1800s AD.

Aw tronum is a thick and strong chest cover that hugs the body closely. The style is similar to the aw chang pong but doesn't leave as much skin uncovered. The av tronum was popular among wealthy young women in the Chatomok era; today it is an important costume in Khmer classical dance.

=== Av bampong ===
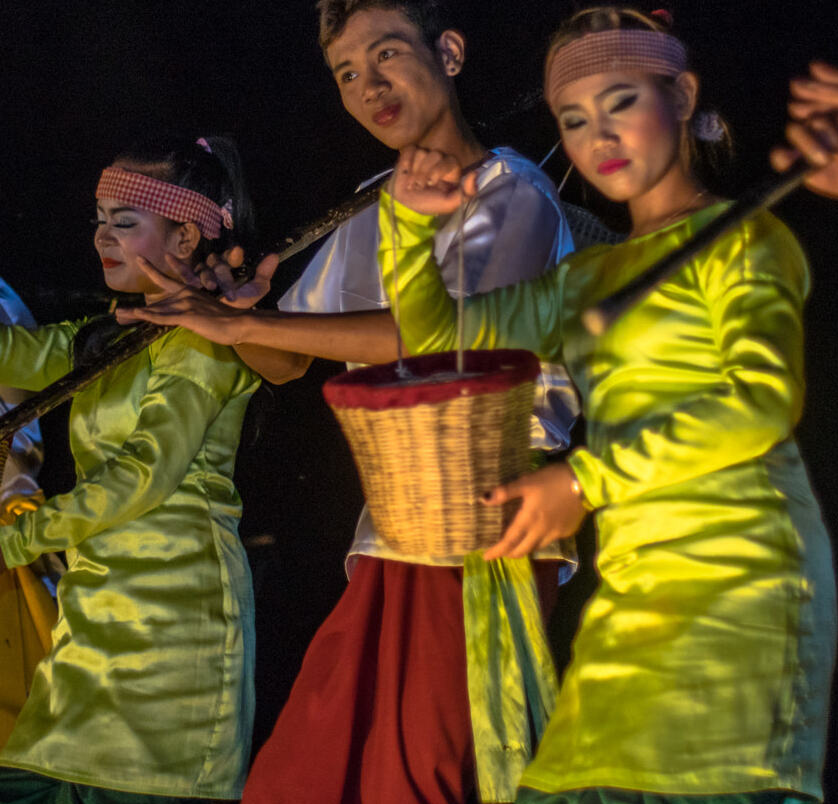
Folk dancers in av bampong.

Av bampong (Khmer: អាវបំពង់) is a long-sleeved, flared hem tube shirt with a likeness to the Malay baju kurung, and noted by travelers during the close of the 19th century as the attire of Muslims in Cambodia. Chams wear av bampong for festivals and the Royal Plowing Ceremony, and the garment is seen in historical and religious pagoda paintings.

=== Av pay ===
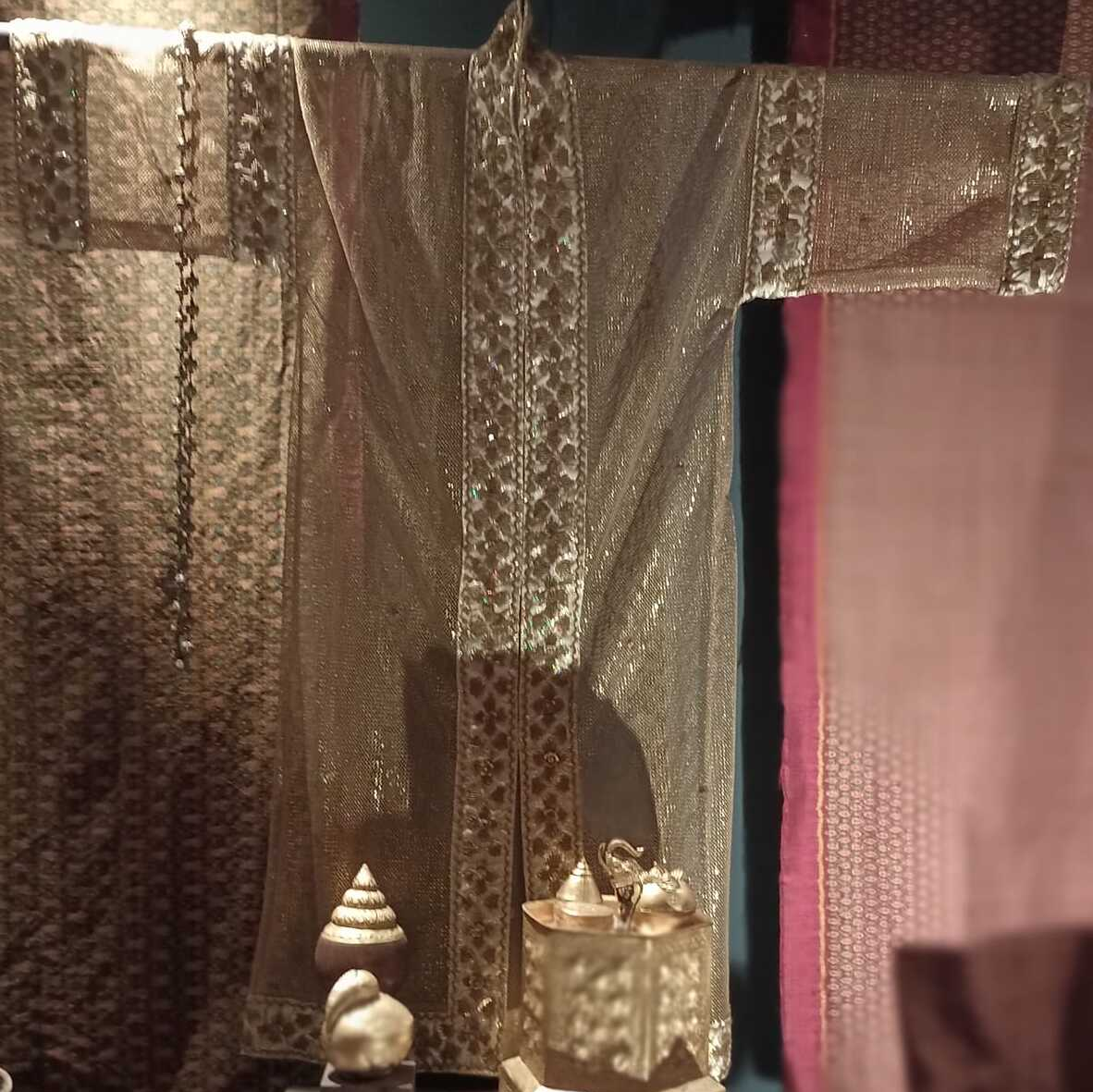
Khmer traditional clothing: av pay.

Av pay (Khmer: អាវផាយ) is an open-front, loose, translucent, formal jacket enriched with gold for men worn over a shirt or jacket by grooms and for other ceremonies. A man atop an elephant-carried chariot in a Bayon carving wears a robe resembling the av pay.

=== Av ko trung ===
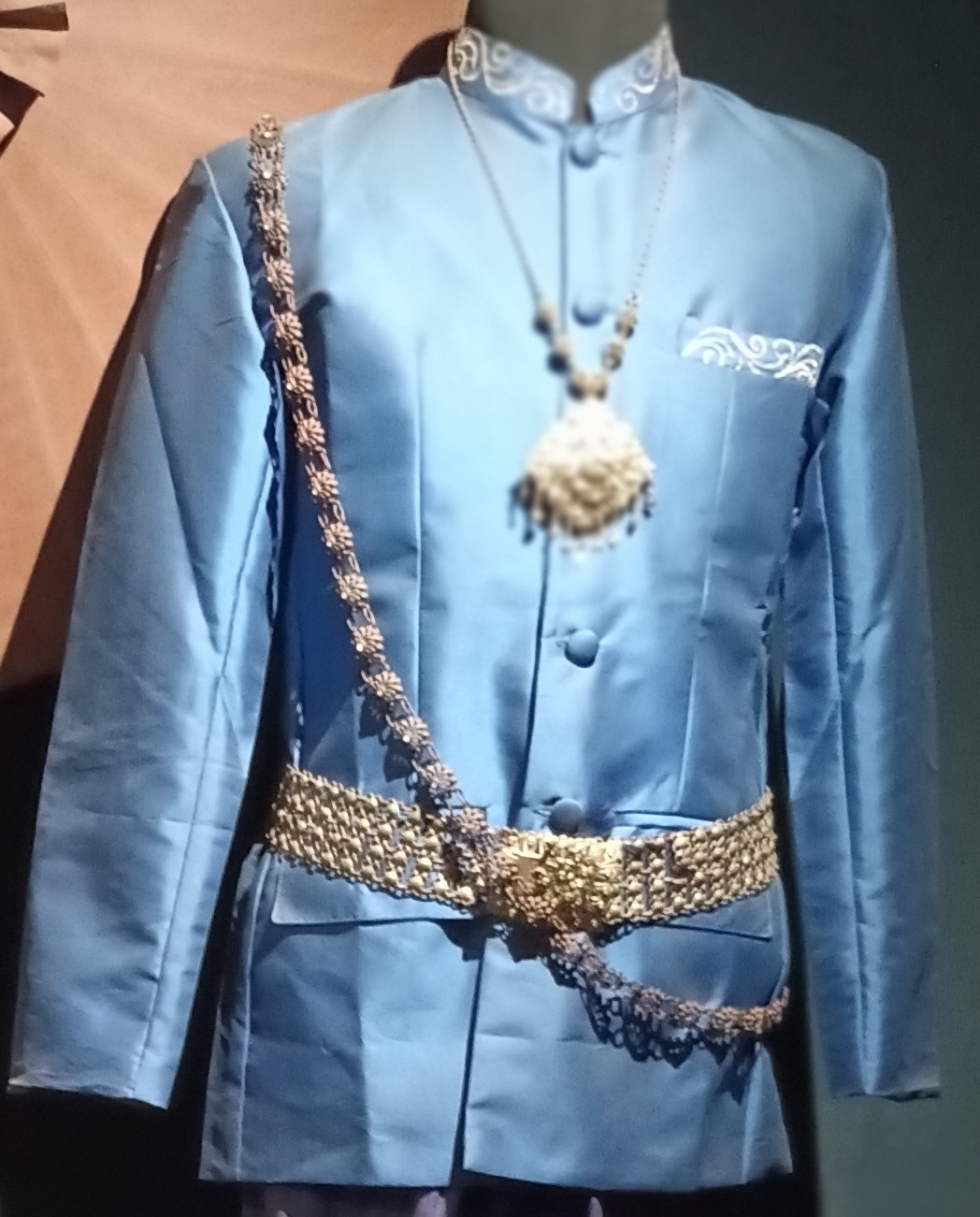
Khmer traditional clothing: av ko trung.

Av ko trung (Khmer: អាវកត្រង់) is a men's jacket similar to a paletot with front panels bearing pockets and buttons, and a standing, narrow collar. Often worn under the av pay.

=== Av nay ===
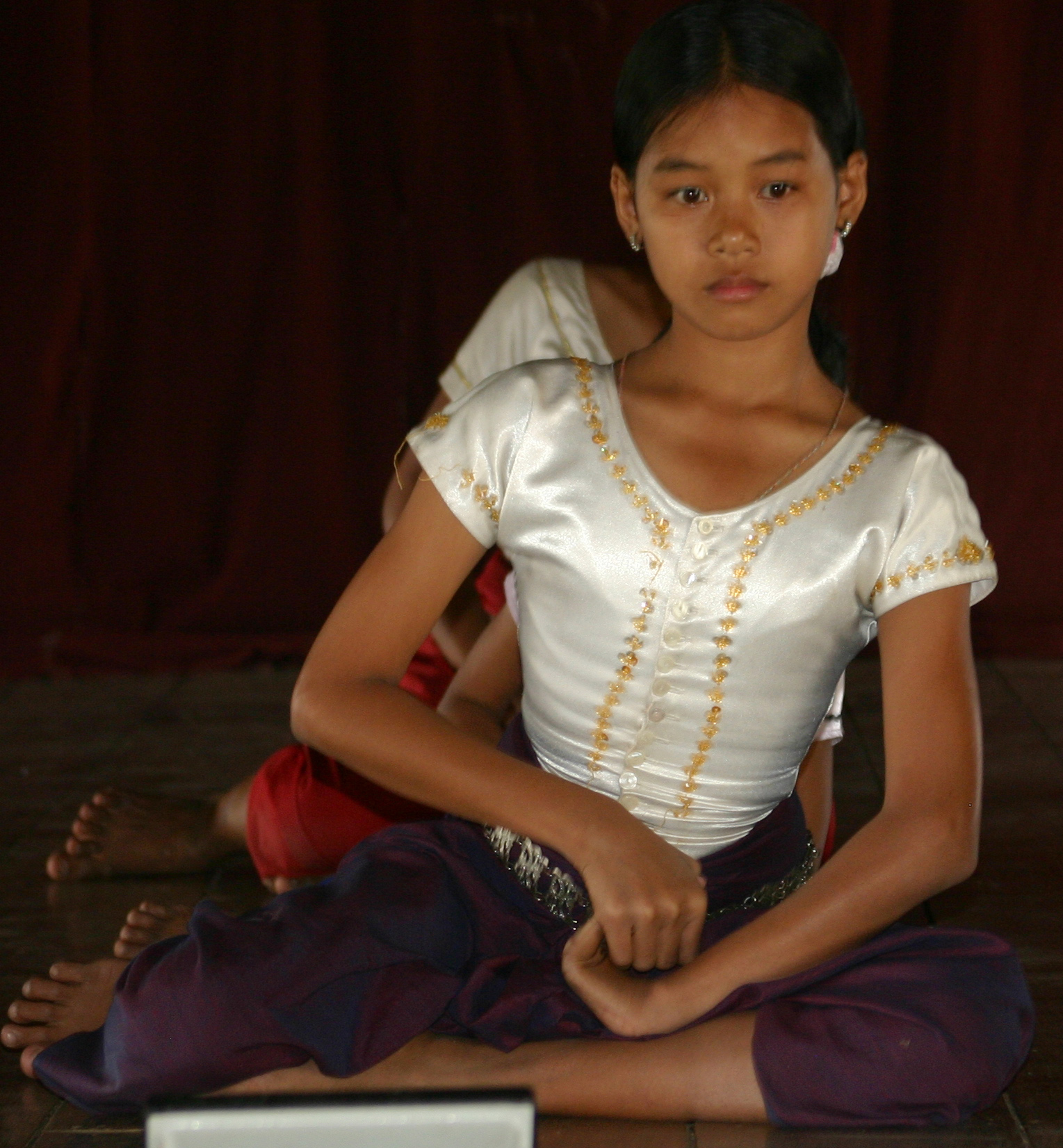
Khmer traditional clothing: girl in an av nay with for dance exercises.

Av nay (Khmer: អាវណយ) is a tight, short-sleeved, button up shirt worn by women and girl dancers for practice and rehearsal.

=== Av phnat kbach ===
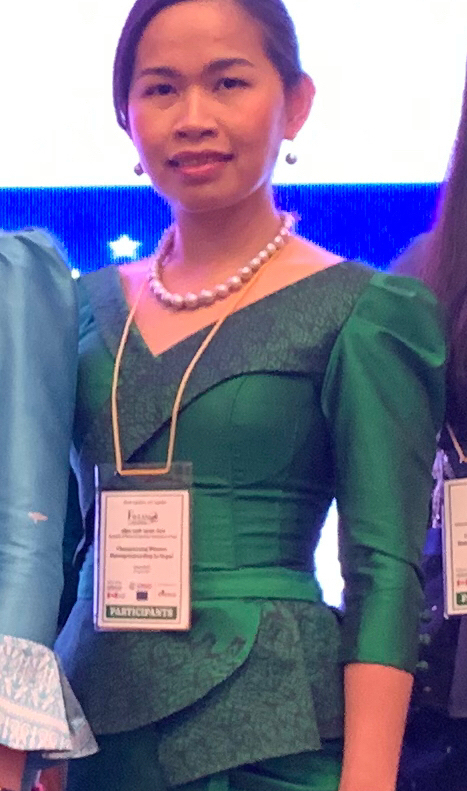
Khmer traditional clothing: av phnat kbach.

Av phnat kbach (Khmer: អាវផ្នត់ក្បាច់) is a women's formal shirt adorned with a row of pleats that's often decorated. It is often paired with a collar and sleeve hems in the same style.

=== Av pak ===
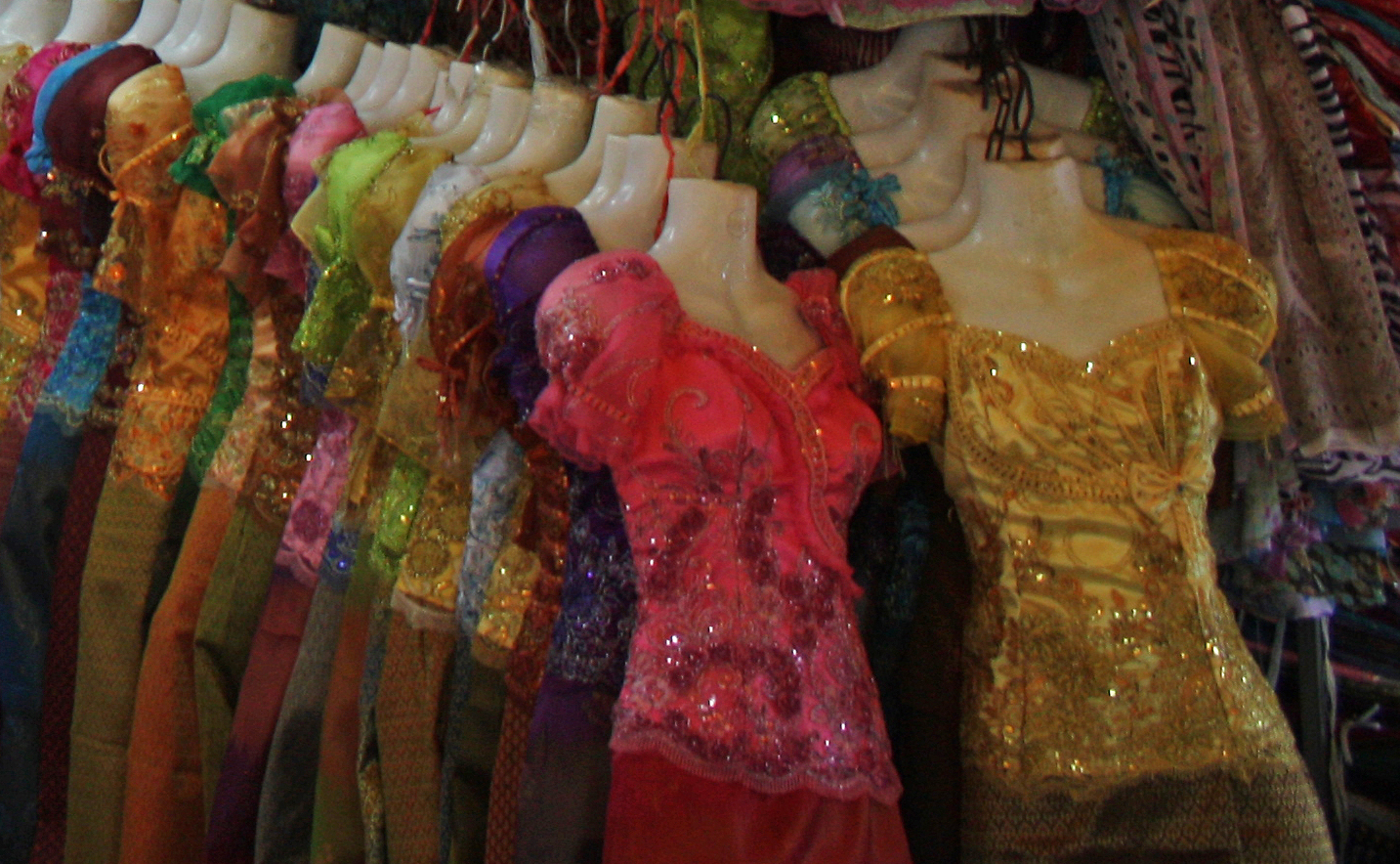
Khmer traditional clothing: av paks with sampots.

Av pak (Khmer: អាវប៉ាក់) refers to a (usually) women's shirt featuring lace and/or embroidery. The collar, sleeves, and necklines come in various fashions. Normally form-fitted, an av pak is worn for festivals and formal occasions. Some might choose white to visit pagodas but purple, red, or other bright colors for festivals. Av pak is often paired with sampot hol or phamuong.

=== Av dai paong ===
Av dai paong (Khmer: អាវដៃប៉ោង) is a blouse from the Longvek era that only wealthy women could afford then. Dai paong means puffed short sleeves. This top usually has a front column of buttons.

=== Sbai ===
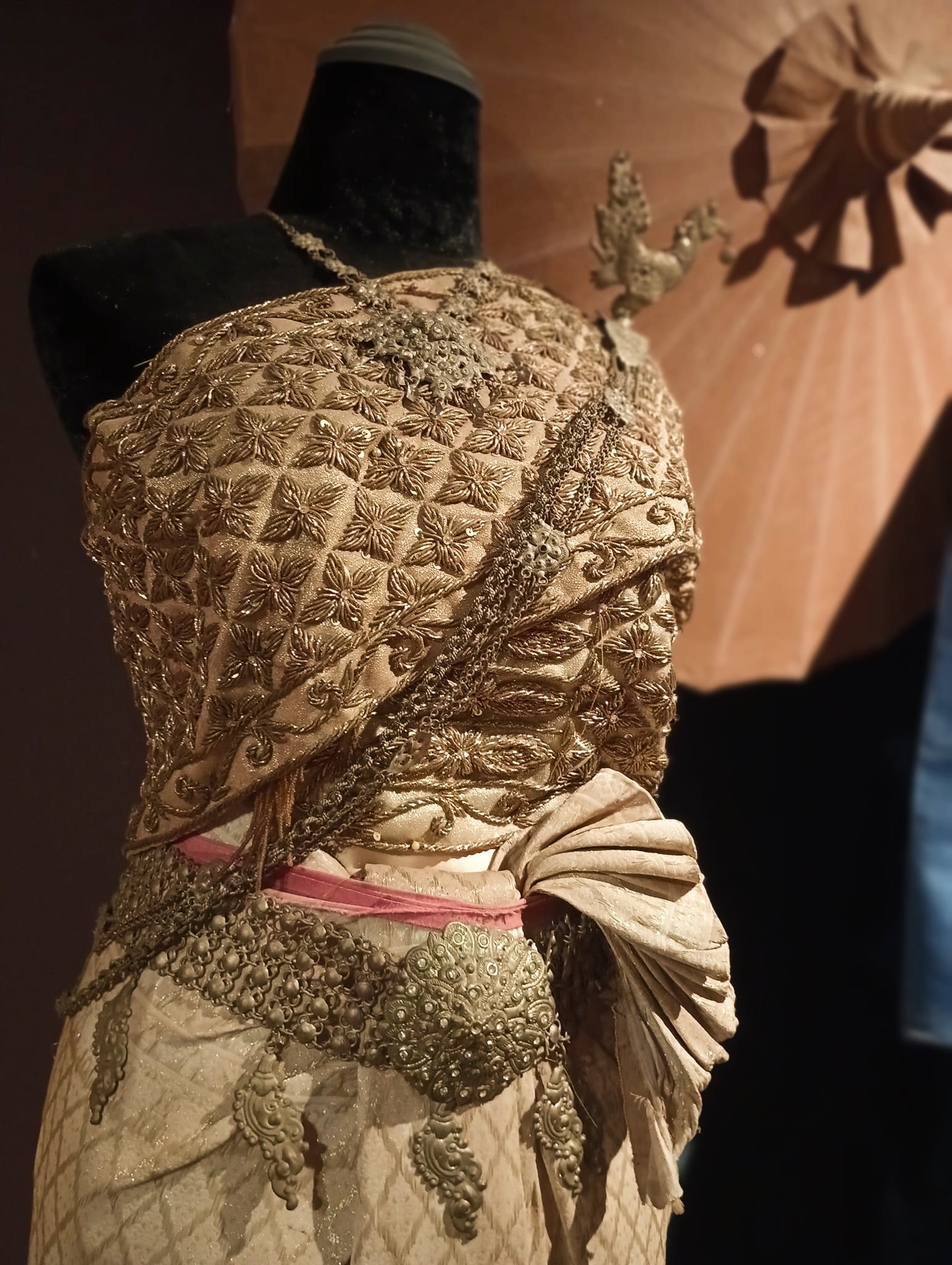
Khmer traditional clothing: sbai with ancient Khmer diamond-floral chakkachan kbach & sampot robab.

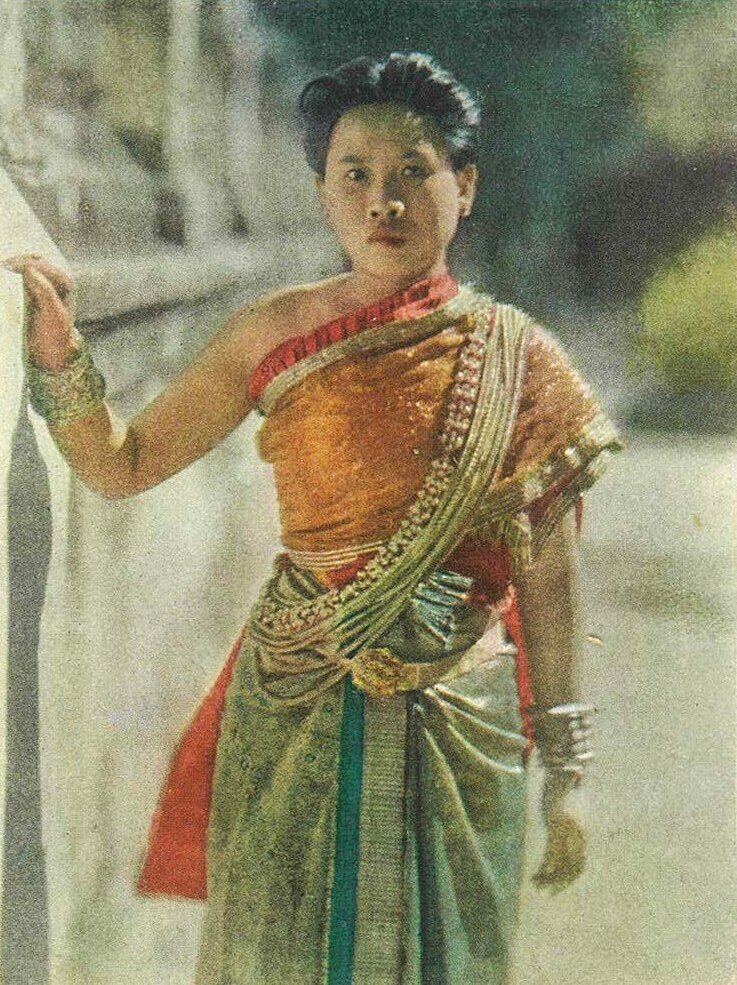
Khmer traditional clothing: Khmer bride in sbai. Phnom Penh, 1927.

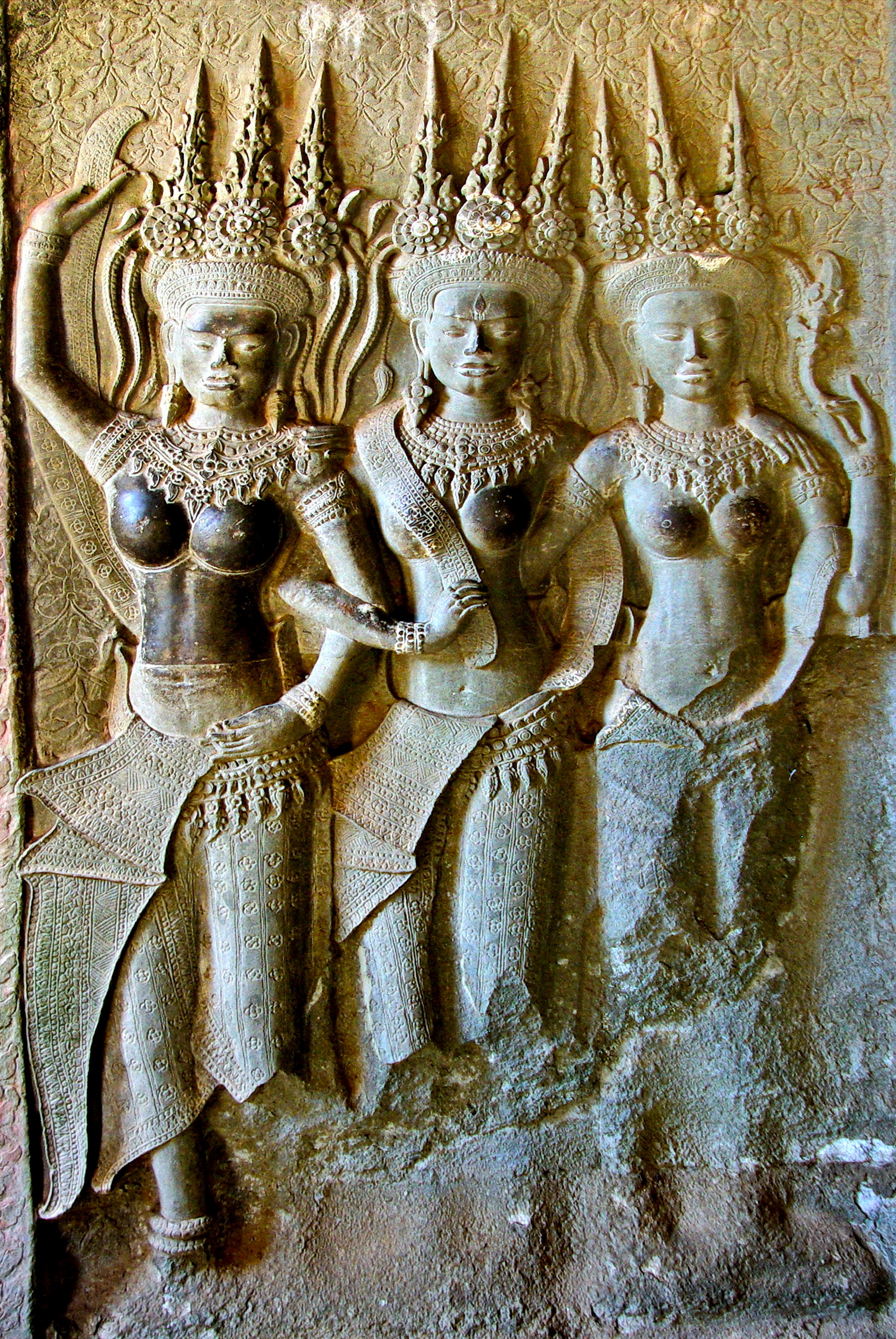
Khmer traditional clothing: 12th century devatas wrapping the narrow, short sbais attached to their sampots, Angkor Wat

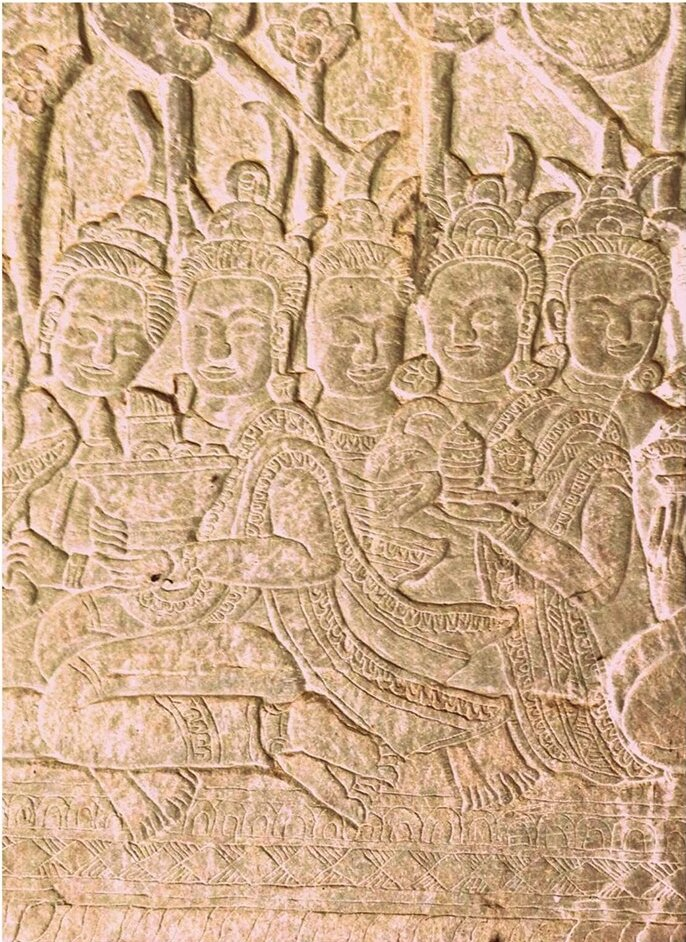
Khmer traditional clothing: 16th century Theravada Buddhist women in wide, long sbai, Angkor Wat.

In Khmer, the sbai (ស្បៃ) refers to an asymmetrical breast-sash, usually embroidered and of silk, worn for ballet performances and ceremonies. Chinese chronicles relay from the founding legend of Neang Neak and Preah Thong that the latter wasn't happy with Neang Neak's nude state and so he "folded a piece of material to make a garment through which he had her pass her head." That describes how already-sewn sbai is worn even today when the garment isn't sewn onto the wearer. The sbai is used in traditional Khmer weddings during the rite of Preah Thong Taong Sbai Neang Neak ("Preah Thong holding on to the sbai of Neang Neak") to symbolize the founding legend of the Khmer people. The groom holds on to the bride's sbai from behind for a ritualistic walk representing "their entering into her naga realm."

In bas-reliefs at Angkor Wat, devatas often have twin pieces of fabric tucked inside their sampot and cascading down its length. Khmer ballet guru and scholar Prumsodun Ok describes one group of three "with one in the act of wrapping the cloth from the back," the second one covering her right breast, and the third with the sbai "dangling in the front from her bent elbow, suggesting that it can be wrapped from the front like a sbai as well." A 16th century Angkor Wat bas-relief depicts women attendants wearing long sbai. The popular sbai pattern in modern Cambodia "feature a diamond‑floral pattern known as chakkachan" which also appears on the sbai of female ballet roles and on upper garments of demons and male roles. Angkor Wat bears carvings of the textile pattern, as does Sambor Prei Kuk, proving that the pattern was known to Khmers "by the seventh century." The Buddha in many Khmer depictions dons a sbai thom (great/big sbai) or sbai phluoh (twin sbai). Sbai tol is the common style for women in modern Cambodia. One end of the garment wraps around the chest as the other end is left flowing down the back; the right shoulder remains uncovered.

In a village called Sampan Leu in the Sa’ang District of Kandal province, sbai embroidery is a tradition passed down for generations for some 40 families. The designs themselves are decided by customers and the "predefined patterns" are passed on to the embroiderers. Pieces are often rented by those visiting Angkor Wat, for festivals, and also weddings, and material is not limited to silk. The in-demand sbais are crafted with authentic, traditional Khmer patterns by the artisans with the goal of preserving Khmer culture.

== Krama ==
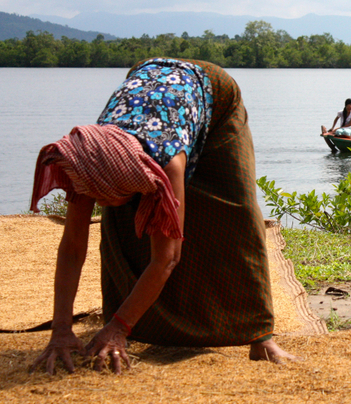
A farmer at work wearing her krama.

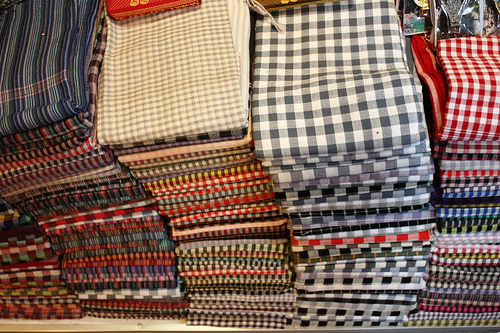
Selection of kramas.

Cambodians traditionally wear a checkered scarf called a krama (ក្រមា). The krama has been a feature of Khmer dress since the first-century reign of Preah Bath Hun Tean, although it is unclear exactly when the krama became fashionable in the street. The krama is one trait that distinguishes the Khmer from their Thai, Vietnamese, and Laotian neighbours. It is used for many purposes, including for style, for protection from the hot sun, as an aid for one's feet when climbing trees, as a hammock for infants, as a towel, or as a sarong. A krama can also be easily shaped into a small child's doll for play. Under the Khmer Rouge, all Khmer were forced to wear a checkered krama.

== Textiles ==
Silk and cotton weaving in Cambodia have a long history. Written records, bas-reliefs and the report of the Chinese emissary Zhou Daguan who stayed in Angkor in 1296 show that looms have been used to weave sompots since ancient times. Women learned to apply highly complex methods and intricate patterns. According to Zhou silk production was brought into Angkor via Siam, "In recent years people from Siam have come to live in Cambodia, and unlike the locals they engage in silk production. The mulberry trees they grow and the silkworms they raise all came from Siam. They themselves weave the silk into clothes made of a black patterned satiny silk". Silkworms have been bred by villagers along the banks of the Mekong and Bassak rivers as early as the 13th century.

There are three important silk textiles in Cambodia: (1) the ikat silks (chong kiet in Khmer), or hol; (2) the twill-patterned silks; and (3) the weft ikat textiles. Patterns are made by tying natural or synthetic fibers on the weft threads and then dyeing them. This process is repeated with different colors until the patterns firm and cloth is woven. Red, yellow, green, blue and black are the most commonly used colors. Colours were traditionally allocated to different days of the week: starting at Monday, they were dark yellow; purple; green; light green; dark blue; dark red; and bright red.

Chong kiet is the Khmer ikat technique. To create patterns, weavers tie-dye portions of weft yarn before weaving begins. Patterns are diverse and vary by region; common motifs include lattice, stars, and spots.

== Cambodian clothing styles by period ==
The Khmer sampot with its many variations was generally regarded as the national dress of Cambodia. But variations in clothes sharply indicated position in a firm social hierarchy, as well as regional and period changes. New fashions were slowly passed down to the generations, though some clothing styles disappeared only to be restored in a later period.

=== Funan era (68—550) ===
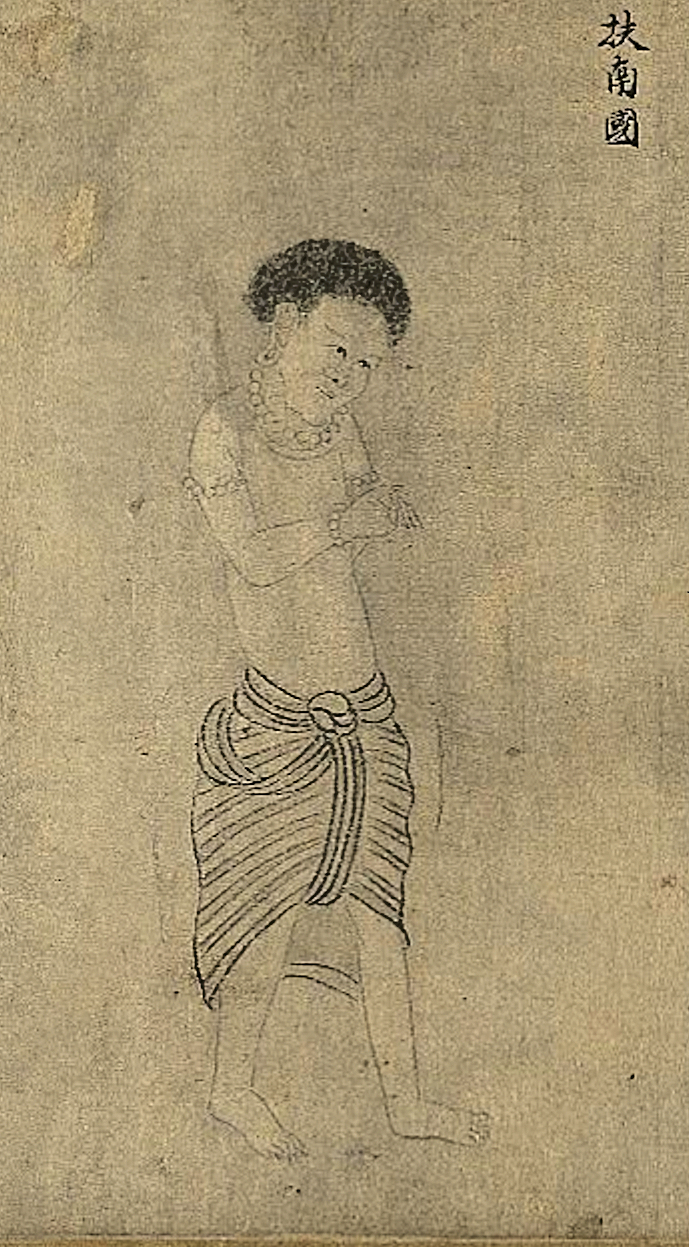
Envoy of Funan to the Liang dynasty wearing a Sampot Chong Kben by painter Gu Deqian of the Southern Tang dynasty (937–976 CE).

Clothing styles in the first Cambodian period was overwhelmingly influenced by India, at least until the Khmer king at the request of Chinese envoys ordered his subjects to wear the sompot. Despite some similarities, men and women wore distinct clothing styles.

- Men: All the males in the region wore Indian styled clothing. The people in the region generally wore sampot chang kben but much more Indian looking than today. The King, his family and nobles had their own style of Sarabat textile imported from China. A bas-relief shows wealthy people wearing the cloth like a Dhoti, winding it around the upper body and tying the waist with a thin piece of cloth.

Noblemen and royalty wore the sampot chang Kben in everyday life with the chest exposed. Varieties of Yantra tattooing in ancient Khmer script were inscribed on their bodies for spiritual protection. With the spread of Hinduism across the country, the King wore a crown with different colored corners to show his royalty.

- Women wore "brocaded sarongs", probably sampots in different colours, held at the waist with a gold belt. The most useful sompot would have been a Sompot Sarabap, made from the expensive light silk of the country. This left the upper body naked, but women would have added a Sarong Kor (see below) as a collar to display their jewelry, including big triangular earrings of wood or gold, or earrings shaped like bracelets.

Short, straight hairstyles were worn by non-royal courtiers; the chignon or topknot was typically reserved for royalty.

Unlike the rich, the poor wore a simple straw skirt around the waist or one made of animal skin or cotton. They had no jewellery but wore hairstyles similar to those of the rich.

=== Chenla (550—802) ===
(Khmer: សម័យចេនឡា)

Clothing styles in this period bore certain resemblances to those in Funan; however, according to the bas-belief at Vat Phou, a surviving ruin of Chenla, its national costume differed significantly from that of Funan excepting the headdress worn at that time only by the king.

- Men would tie their hair into a topknot and crown it with a Funan-style headdress. Men continued to wear the sampot, but in many variations. The men wore a kind of collar but displayed a naked chest. A sword or dagger at the chest indicated bravery, developed musculature indicated manly strength.
- Women also tied their hair into a topknot, but adorned the head with a flower. They would also crown the head with a floral circlet made of gold. They wore the sampot or a floral textile Sarong with a Pidan cloth, matched with a golden belt and held by a new style of Khmer Sarong Kor below the neck. Breasts and stomach remained naked (see the next section). The most striking development of this period is the ladies-in-waiting of the palace wearing a shawl-like sbai over the left shoulder to cover the breast and stomach in a Buddhist manner. Royal women wore a Sava, a loosely decorated band of beads worn crosswise.

=== Angkor era (802—1432) ===
In the Khmer Empire or Angkor period, Khmer styles moved firmly away from the Indian styles of earlier periods. At the same time Khmer culture spread its influence far beyond the boundaries of the Empire. In Zhou Daguan's The Customs of Cambodia the following can be found:

Among the Khmer (excluding vast numbers of hill-tribe slaves), both men and women wore their hair tied up in a knot. All were naked to the waist with a cloth around the hips. In public, they wore a larger cloth over the smaller one. All were barefoot.

From the king down, the social distinction was marked by the quality and decoration of the cloth. Only the king was permitted to wear cloth fully patterned with flowers. His head was also wreathed with flowers when he was not wearing a Buddha-like gold crown. On his fingers and toes he wore bracelets encrusted with gold and pearls. The palms of his hands and soles of his feet were dyed crimson. He carried the gold sword of office in public.

Parasols, as extensions of clothing, were severely graded in number and gilding from the king's eight or more parasols down to a Buddhist monk's one. The king's subjects' clothes were various reductions of the royal ensemble. Court officials and members of the royal family were permitted cloth showing a design in scattered flowers; low officials were limited to two flowers; male commoners had none, though common women were permitted to crimson their feet and hands and wear a cloth showing two flowers.

Contemporary inscriptions and bas-reliefs of the temples at Angkor, especially Angkor Wat and the Bayon, show that the "cloths" were various forms and widths of sampot, worn as skirts by women but hitched up into trousers or shorts by men for military action or labour.

Zhou Daguan reported that the common women had no hair ornaments, though some wore golden rings or bracelets and a metal belt. Beautiful girls were sent to the court to serve the king or his family; like concubines and other court servants, they wore crimson markings on the crown of the head. Temple evidence shows that women of the era, rich and poor, used a golden buckle to cover the upper body. The topknot allowed a long ponytail, worn over the shoulder.

Temple bas-reliefs show how celestial apsaras were conceived. To appear in this way to royalty, a court dancer added special ornaments to Khmer elements. The Sarong Kor was a round decorative collar, red coloured, highly visible, worn just below the neck and embellished with detailed gold-colored copper ornaments and beaded designs. The dancer added a loosely decorated band of beads worn crosswise called a sava. Her Sompot was more highly decorated than usual, with two knots at the waist. The right knot is long but the left knot design is more charming and fashionable.

The waist has a highly ornate belt decorated with warped, spear-like tips draped on a red cloth. The most-used jewellery is at the ankle, dangling from the ears or around the wrists. Most striking of all is the apsara's crown: a tricorn headdress of finely beaten silver or gold with two or three garlands of emeralds and gold. These were worn by royal princesses, sculptured female divinities, female dancers and female musicians. Though this costume is not usually worn today, it has become part of the high culture of Cambodia in the Apsara Dance.

Angkor court ladies' dress was a little different from the court dancers'. However, bas-reliefs show the costumes of Queens Jayarajadevi and Indradevi to have a unique sava in a glittering gold floral print instead of apsara beading. Queen Indradevi's crown has ten points and a large diamond in the center holding her headdress in place.

Angkorian legacy on Khmer skirts sampot

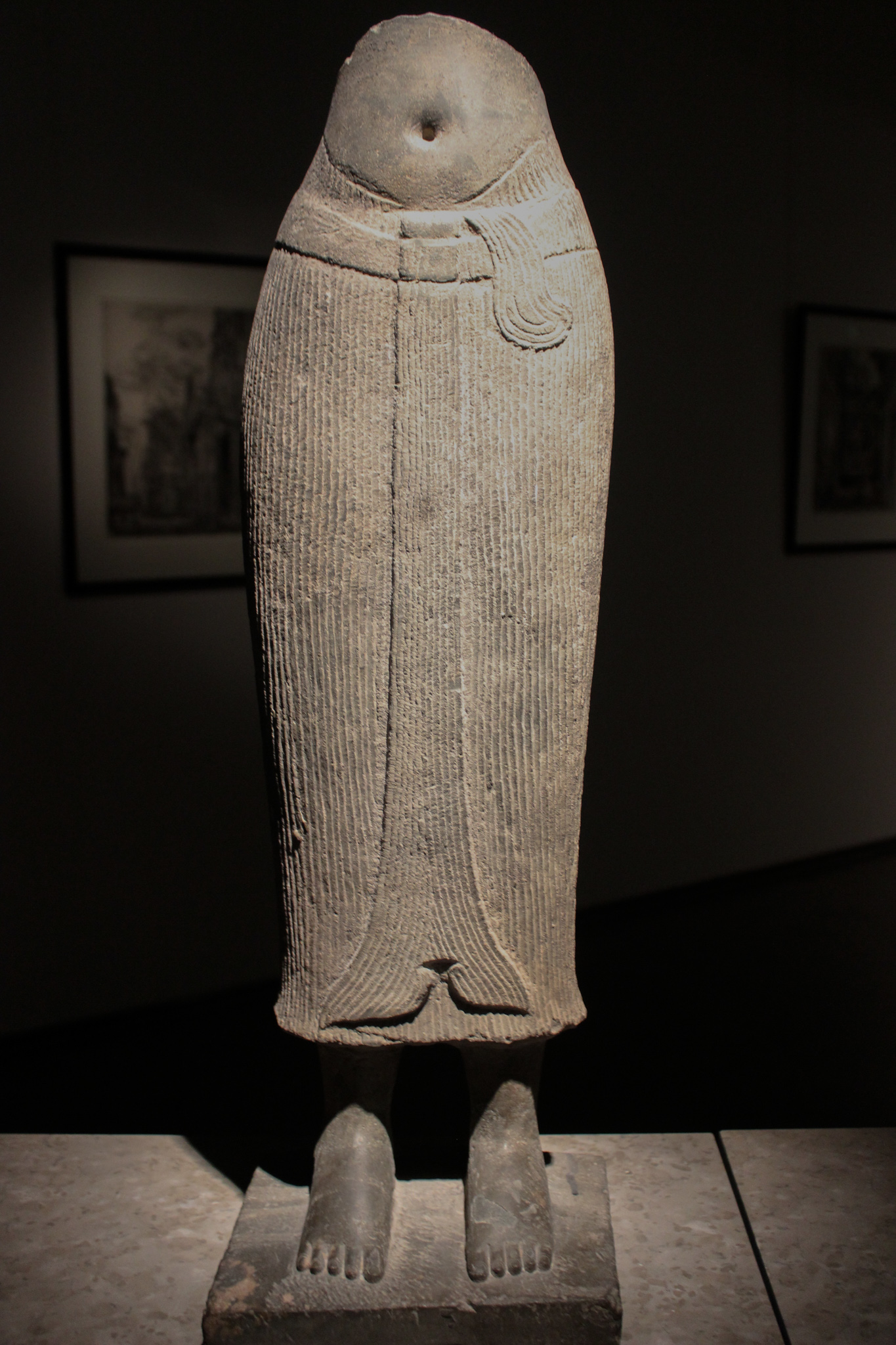
11th century Khmer statue wearing sampot samloy, Guimet Museum, Paris

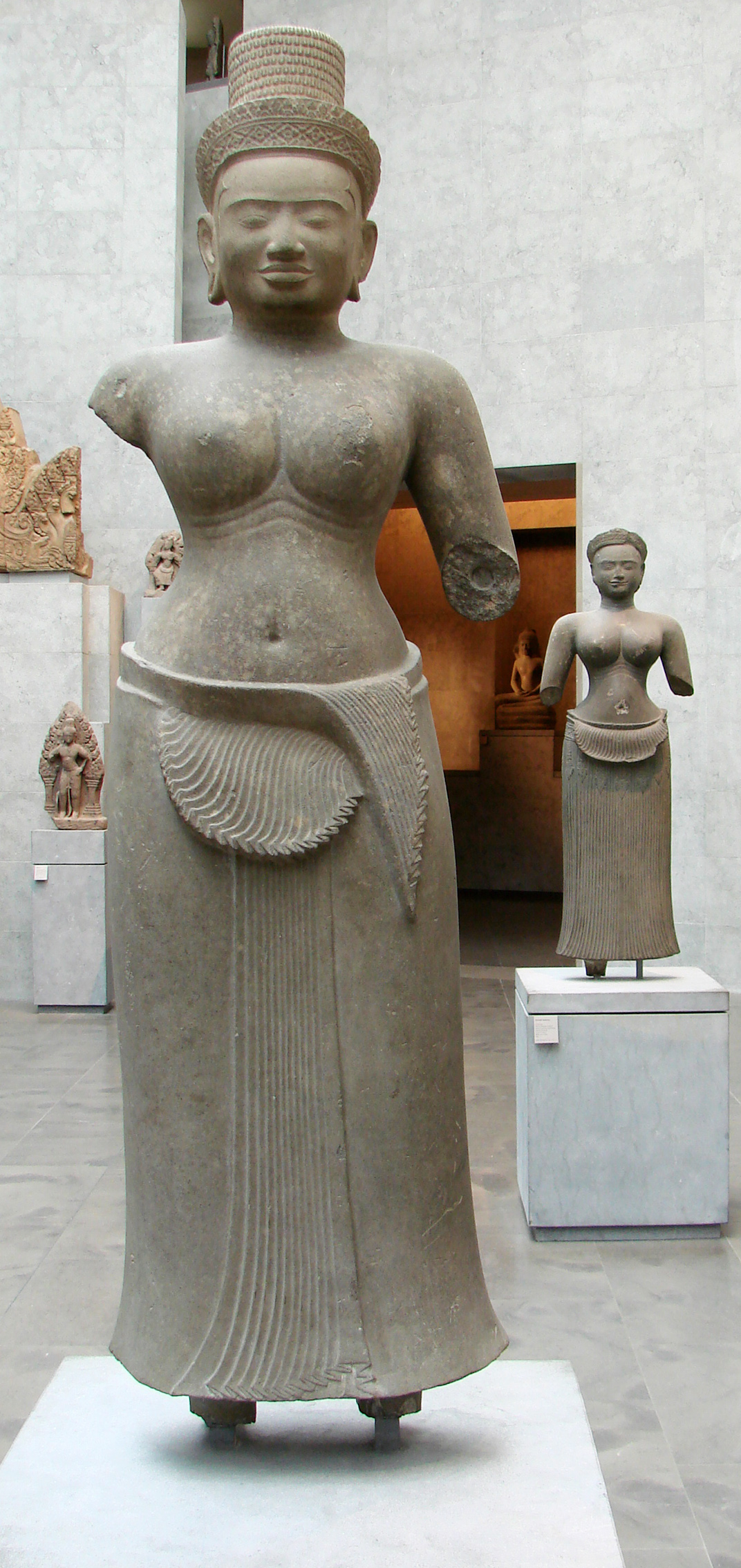
9-10th century Khmer statue wearing another design of sampot

=== Chaktomuk period (1432—1525) ===
(Khmer: សម័យចតុមុខ)

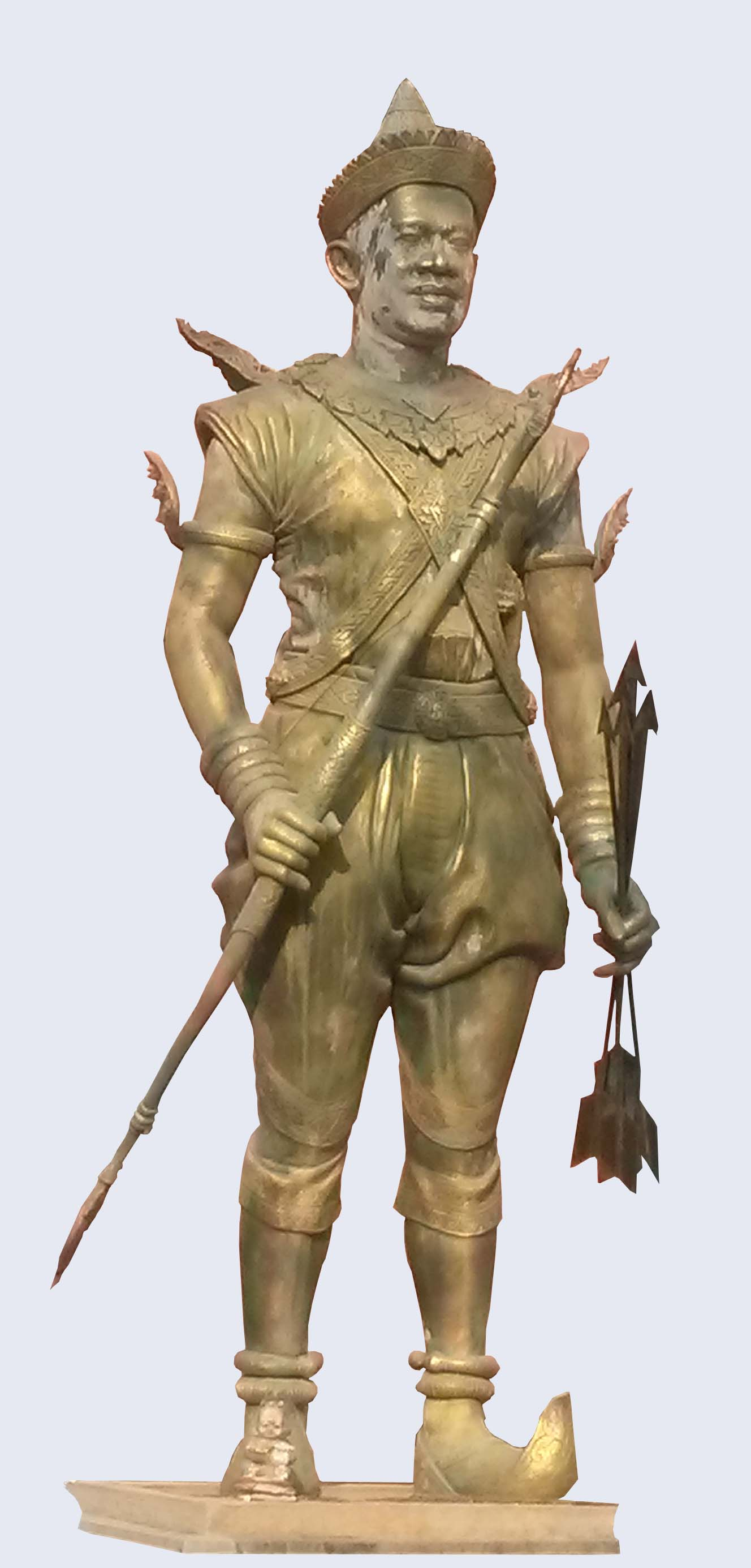
Statue of King Srey Chetha who ruled Cambodia from 1512 to 1521

After the fall of Angkor in 1431, the surviving Cambodians lost their awareness of the old way of living and developed new modes with more affinity to Buddhism than the former Hindu influences.

Royalty: the King wore a long-sleeved shirt sewn at the top with rich embroidery and a collar sometimes with round decorations, sometimes with little sharp tips. There was a sort of epaulette sewn onto the shirt but arching upwards like Indra's bow, a Chinese style from the Tang dynasty. Crisscrossing the front were the kse-sangvar, chains of rank forming an X as they cross over one another, on top of them a diamond-shaped pendant. Below are knee-length, leg-hugging trousers decorated at the hem, covered by a Chong Kben descending to the thigh and with a belt at the waist.

Other accessories include a rectangular loin-cloth at the front and sometimes two others on the side that look like fishtails. These pieces date from the Angkor era. The King wears a crown similar to one from the Angkor period, but with sharper points and higher.

Men mostly went shirtless until they were sufficiently wealthy to find a suitable top. Ordinary Khmer males' attire was a wrap like a Sompot Chong Kben in several colours, but lifted to the thigh and strongly hugging the lower body to free it for physical work. Noblemen wore a round collared shirt with a long pleat at the front and four pockets at the side. Most males wore their hair long.

Women in this era wore highly decorated garments. Young women wrapped themselves in two metres of fabric in chong pok style, revealing a small part of the stomach. This fabric was usually decorated with several colours and pieces of silver, made of heavy or soft cotton depend on the wearer's wealth. Wealthy women wore the chong pok with extra fabric as a shawl sewn in place to the sampot.

They wore their hair up in a bun or as a chignon attached with flowers and draped over the shoulder. Older women wore quieter colors with their favorite sampot samloy and jewellery of bracelets, necklaces and earrings, made from silver, gold and other metal. Older women wore their hair in chignon style only.

Common women wore the same style of clothes as the upper class but in black, most wearing sarongs with no decoration or shawl except a serviceable krama.

=== Longvek era (1529—1594) ===
During this era, the Sampot was characterised by a front panel folded, rounded, and tucked into the waistband; sometimes revealing an undergarment descending to mid-calves. Women's clothing was complemented by a sbai, worn across the chest. Spanish Dominican priest Gabriel Quiroga de San Antonio documented 16th-century Cambodian customs, namely Khmer clothing, in his work A Brief and Truthful Relation of Events in the Kingdom of Cambodia:

"The nobles dress themselves in extraordinarily fine silk and cotton, while the common folk dress in coarse cotton and fustian."

=== Oudong period (1601—1863) ===
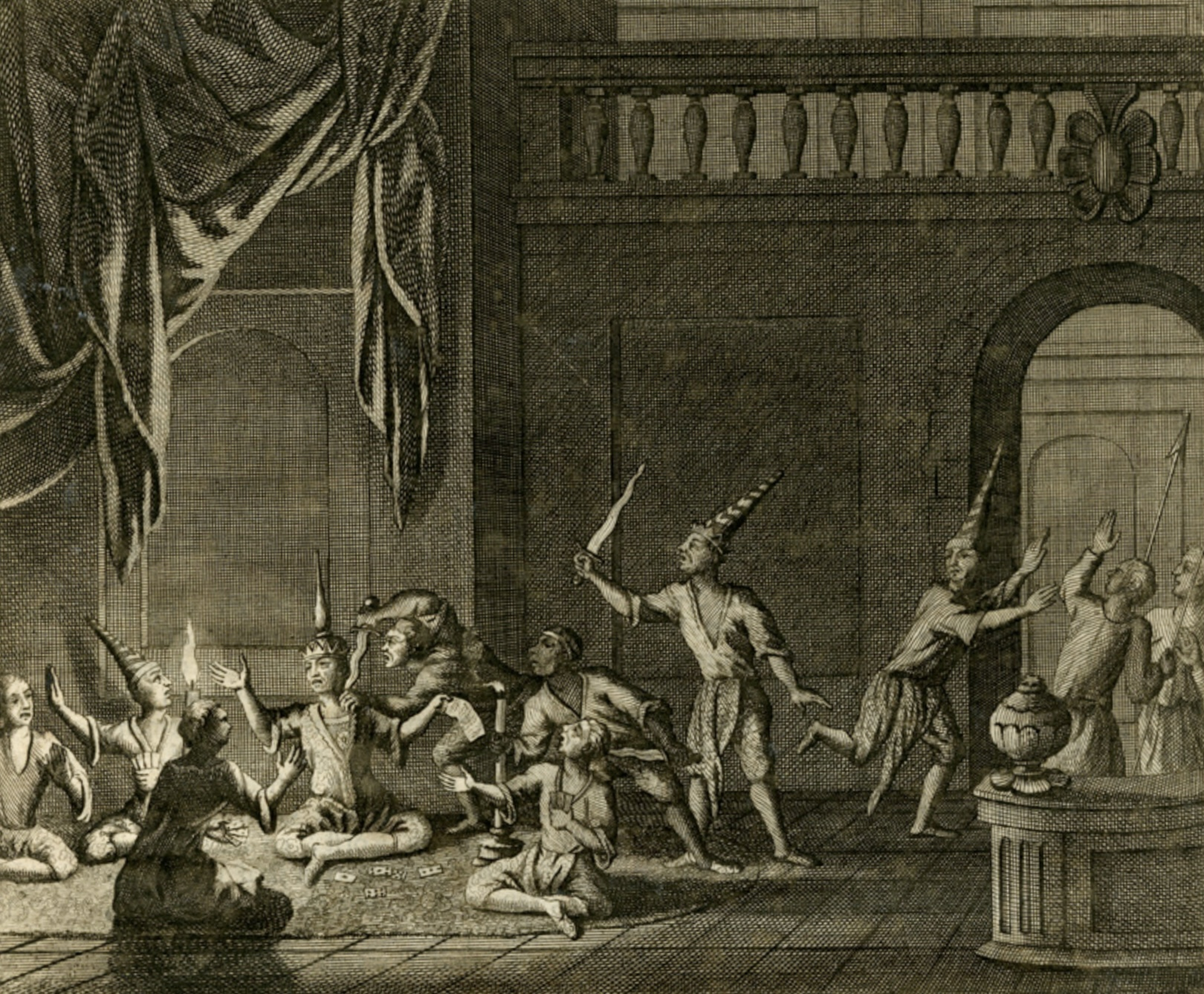
Murder of the Cambodian King and his son in 1642 from a Dutch engraving

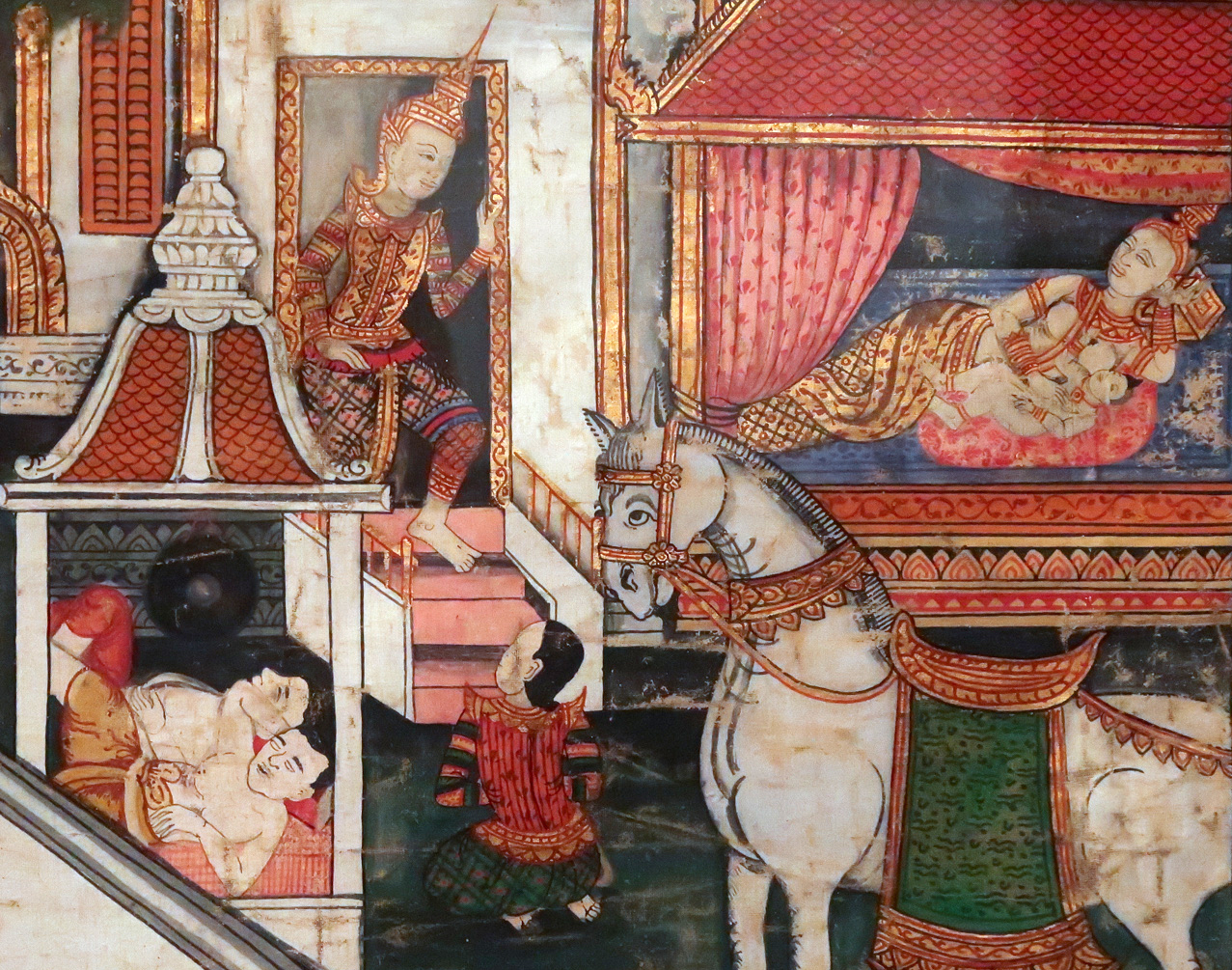
18th-century Cambodian painting

In the Qing Imperial Illustrations of Tributary Peoples completed in 1759, Khmer men are said to cut their hair short and to wrap their heads, leaving their upper bodies exposed while clothing covers their lower halves. Women tie up their hair, leaving their arms and elbows bare, with only their breasts covered. They wear wraparound skirts and go barefoot.

A British officer at the Oudong court in 1854, described the King as being topless and wearing only a sarong with a gold belt adorned with diamonds and rubies. His clothes were not particularly different from those of the rest of the population. The women were described as lightly dressed, with a salembang and a long silk sbai worn across one shoulder. The sbai is described by the officer as being mainly ornamental as it was common that it fell off a shoulder before being put back in place. Vietnamese scholar Pétrus Ky described in 1863 Khmer women as wearing a sarong with a sbai worn across the chest from right to left, as well as a tunic without buttons similar to those of European women.

Ancient rural clothing

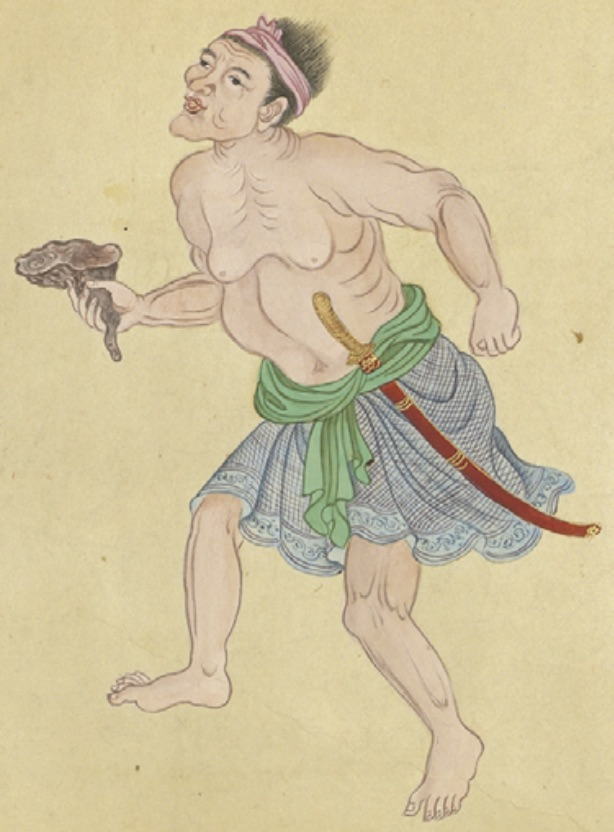
Depiction of a Khmer farmer in 1759 from the Qing Imperial Illustrations of Tributary Peoples

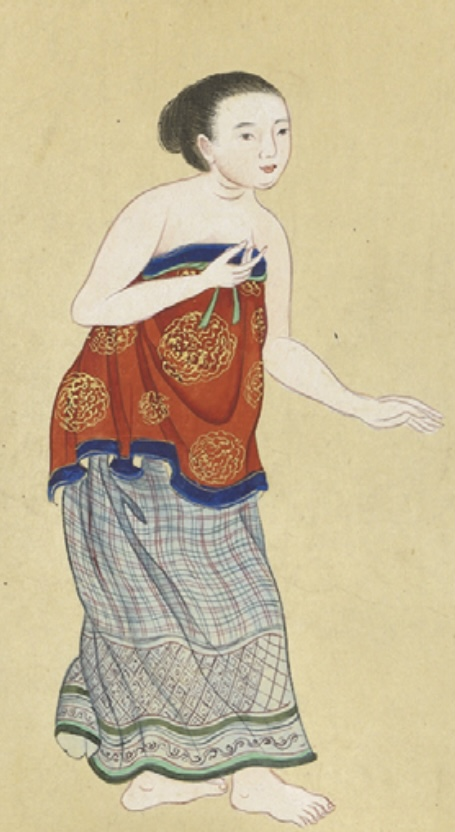
Depiction of a Khmer female commoner in 1759 from the Qing Imperial Illustrations of Tributary Peoples

=== French protectorate of Cambodia (1863—1953) ===
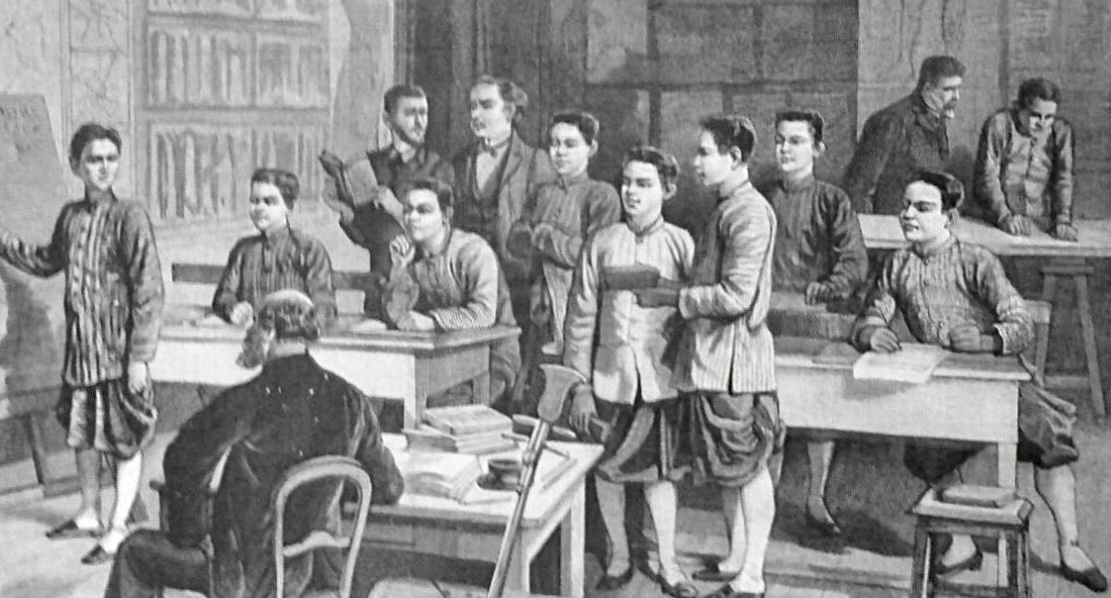
Cambodian school in Paris, drawing published in 1887 in the newspaper Le journal illustré

During the French protectorate in Cambodia, textiles were primarily crafted for family use rather than for economic purposes or trade. The prevalent everyday attire for both men and women consisted of simple plain sarongs. There was a noticeable decline in the use of jewelry and decorative elements. However, among noblemen and the royal family, particularly men, there was a growing influence of Western military uniform styles, often closely mimicking those seen in European countries.

Some noblemen opted for imported textiles to cater to the French officers stationed in Cambodia. There was also a cultural fusion evident in the clothing choices, with some individuals pairing a western style shirt with a sarong, while others wore pants. Women, on the other hand, continued to wear sbai with sarongs.
