= Av pak =

Traditional Cambodian blouse

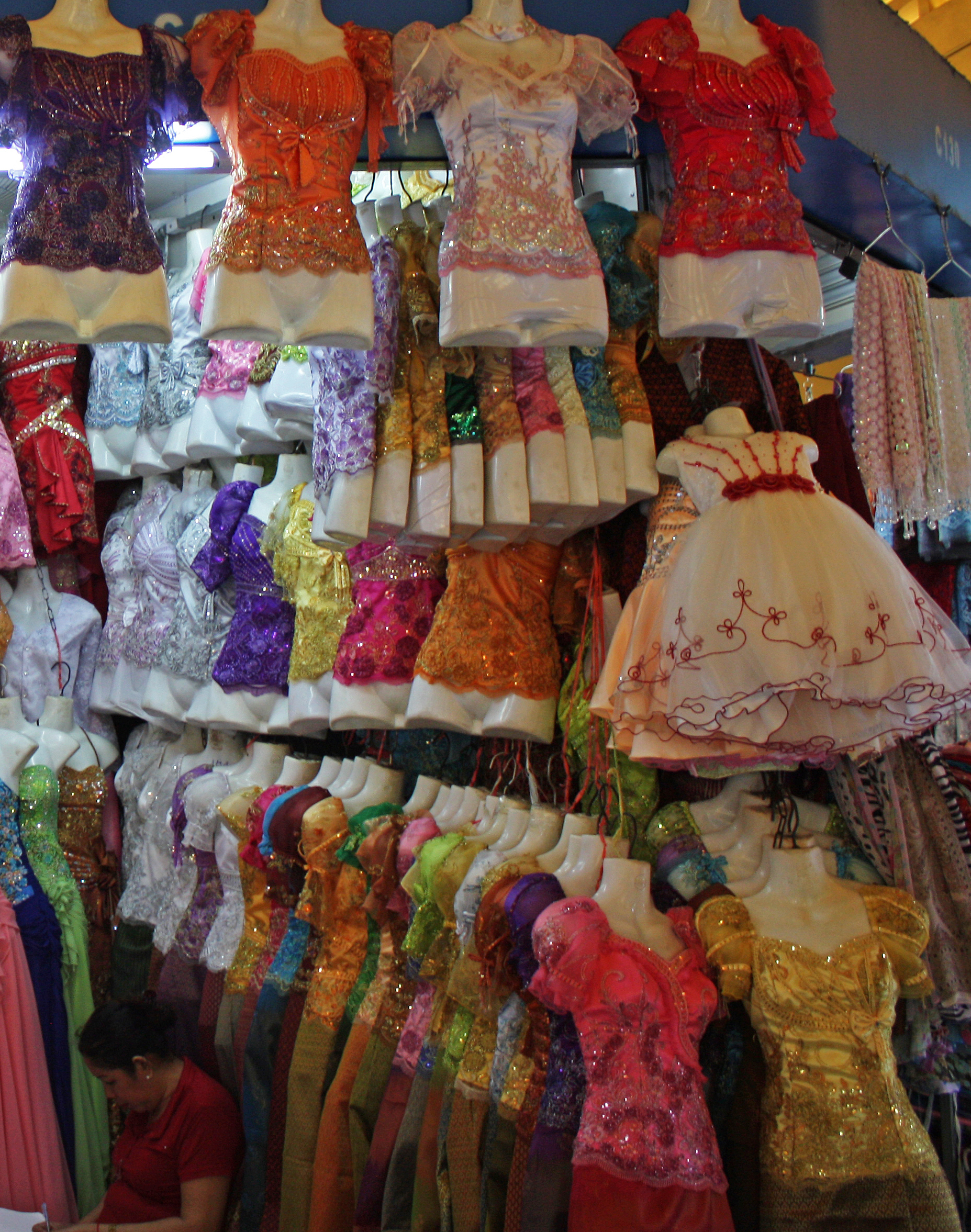
- Av paks in Central Market displayed alone & with sampots
- Type: Traditional shirt
- Material: Silk, cotton
- Place of origin: Cambodia

Av pak (Khmer: អាវប៉ាក់, also pronounced aao pak) is a traditional shirt featuring lace and/or embroidery that's worn by women in Cambodia for festivals and formal occasions.

== Etymology ==
Av pak literally translates to 'embroidery shirt'.

== History ==
The Khmer people consider the av pak to be a classic yet modern shirt which uses traditional Cambodian embroidery. Whereas the shirt's collar, sleeves, and necklines come in various fashions, the av pak is a normally form-fitted garment. Av pak is often paired with a sampot hol or sampot phamuong. Some women might choose an av pak in white to visit pagodas but then go on to wear purple, red, or other bright colors for festivals.

== Gallery ==
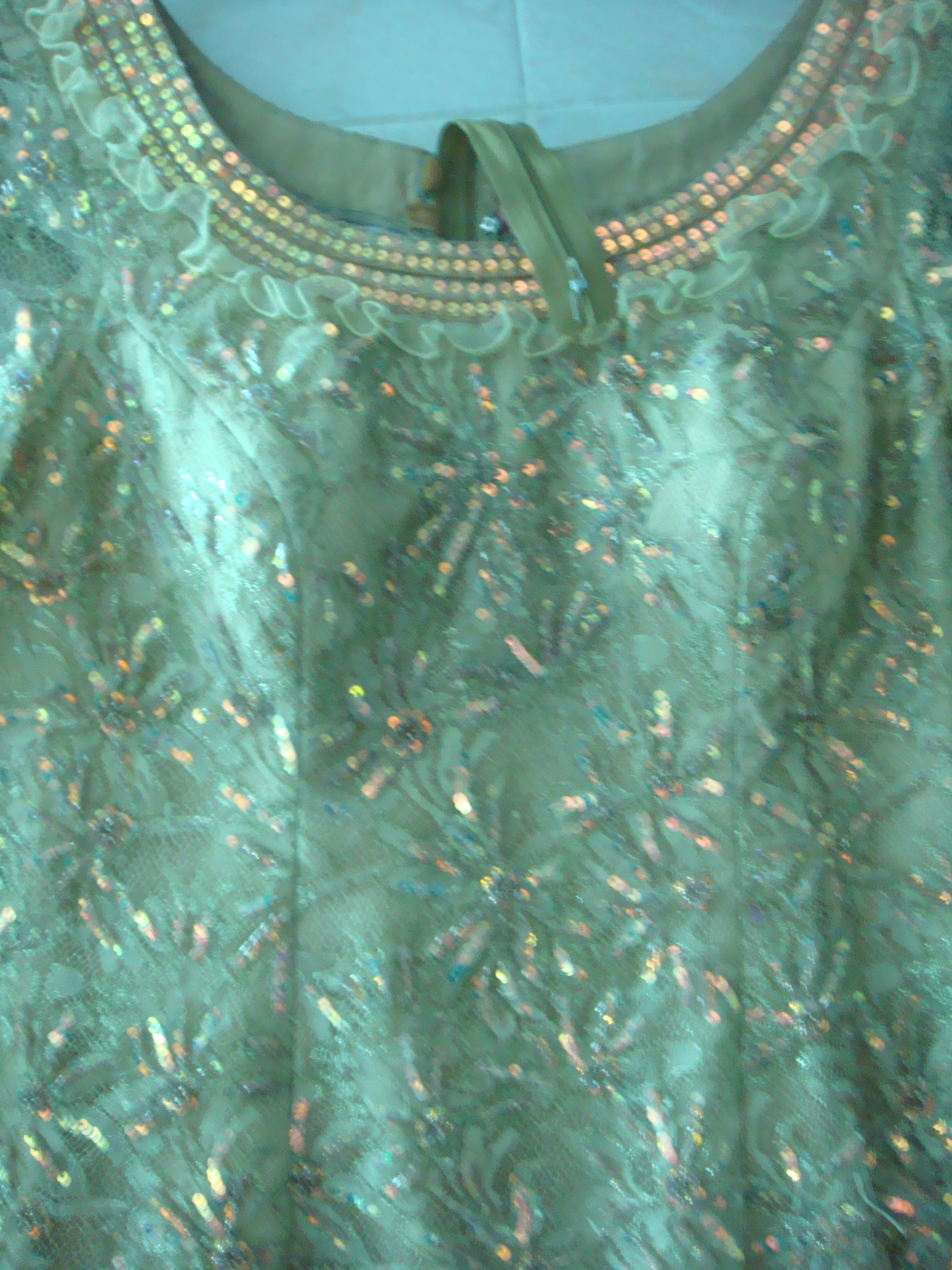
Close-up of an av pak's embroidery.

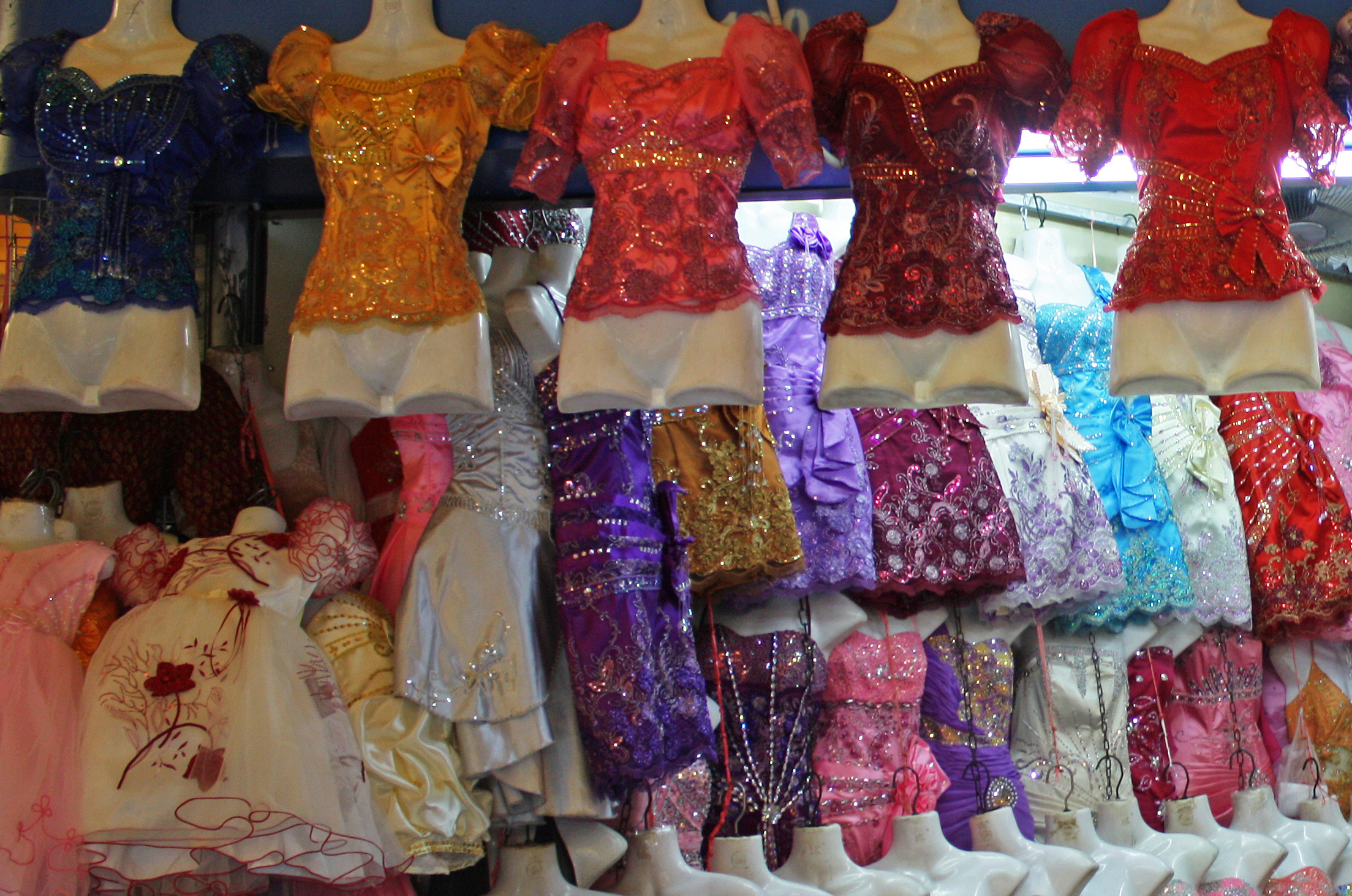
Av paks for sale at Central Market (Phnom Penh). Note the different lengths of sleeves in the top row and the spaghetti-straps and lack of sleeves on the av paks in the bottom row.

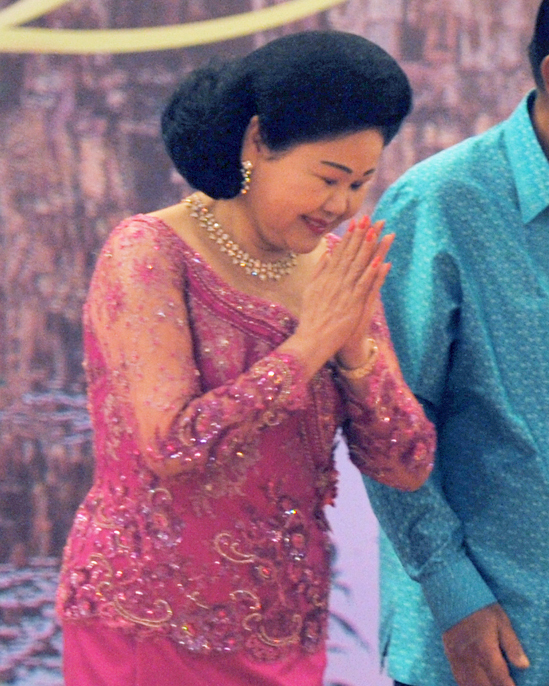
Av pak with long sleeves worn by Mrs. Bun Rany.

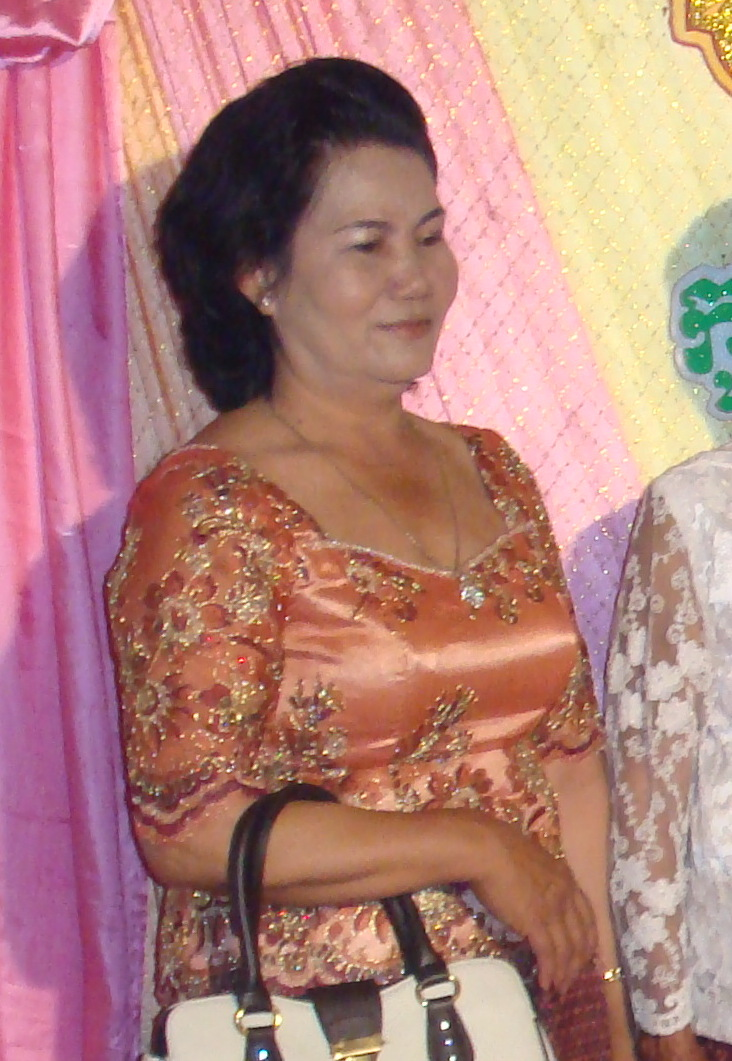
Wedding party member wearing an av pak.

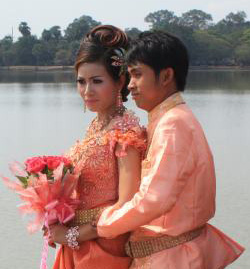
Av pak worn for pre-wedding photoshoot.

== See also ==
- Khmer traditional dress
- Culture of Cambodia
