= Indradevi =

Buddhist queen of the Khmer Empire

Indradevi (Khmer: ឥន្ទ្រទេវី; fl. 1181) was a queen of the Khmer Empire through her marriage to king Jayavarman VII (r. 1181–1219). Reportedly, she influenced affairs of state through her spouse, particularly in favor of Buddhism. She was also the first known female Cambodian poet, as well as a professor.

== Life ==
She was the daughter of ‘kshatriyas, amongst the elite of the royal family’, and the elder sister of queen Jayarajadevi, the first queen of Jayavarman VII. She and her sister were well-educated Buddhists. Indrani later stated that their father was ‘Ja … ’, descended from ‘Rudravarman’ and a woman entitled ‘queen’, and their mother was a descendant of Rajendradevi.

Before her brother-in-law became a king, he was often absent, and Indradevi, who was a Buddhist, comforted her sister with the teachings of Buddhism, and is said to have ‘initiated [Jayarajadevi] into the peace and tranquillity of the teachings of the Buddha, away from the fire of torment’.

When Jayavarman VII succeeded to the throne, queen Jayarajadevi was praised for donating all her property to the poor. After her conversion, queen Jayarajadevi became a teacher herself and:

‘took for her own daughters members of a group of girls who had been abandoned by their mothers … [and] entered them in the religious life with clothes and gifts, according to the prescribed rites’.

She trained the students to perform scenes from the Jataka as a means of instruction to others. Jayarajadevi died early on in her husband's reign. After her death, the king married Indradevi, who became the next queen. Queen Indradevi also took over her sister's schools and was appointed professor or head of the three temple schools Nagendratunge, Tilakottare and Narendraśrama, the three ‘colleges’ Buddhist doctrine and other sciences, which appeared to have been particularly for women and girls, maybe primarily from elite families. She was praised for her knowledge in Sanskrit.

Queen Indradevi was described as intelligent and cultivated, and her spouse apparently allowed her influence upon state affairs.

Indradevi composed a number of poems, some of which were about the reign of Jayavarman VII. She is regarded as "the earliest known female poet in Cambodia".
