= The Customs of Cambodia =

Book written by the Zhou Daguan

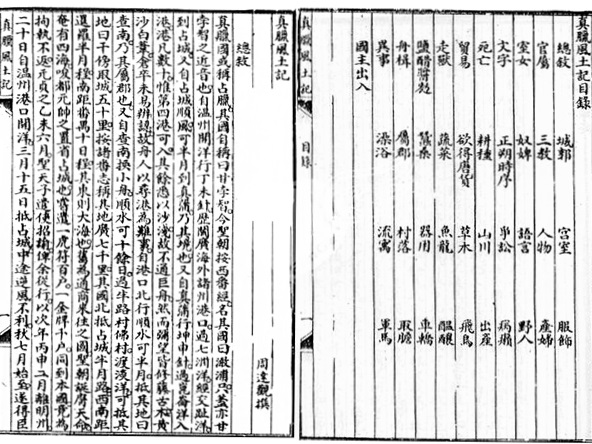
The index and first page

The Customs of Cambodia (Chinese: 真臘風土記; pinyin: Zhēnlà Fēngtǔ Jì), also translated as A Record of Zhenla: the Land and Its People, is a book written by the Yuan dynasty Chinese official Zhou Daguan who stayed in Angkor between 1296 and 1297. Zhou's account is of great historical significance because it is the only surviving first person written record of daily life in the Khmer Empire. The only other written information available is from the inscriptions on temple walls.

== Chinese original work ==
The book is an account of Cambodia by Zhou Daguan, who visited the country as part of an official diplomatic delegation sent by Temür Khan (Emperor Chengzong of Yuan) in 1296 to deliver an imperial edict. It is not certain when it was completed, but it was written within 15 years of Zhou's return to China in 1297. However, the work that survives today is believed to be a truncated and revised version, perhaps representing only around a third of the original size. A 17th-century bibliophile, Qian Zeng (錢曾), noted the existence of two versions of the work, one a Yuan dynasty edition, the other included in a Ming dynasty anthology called Sea of Stories Old and New (古今說海, Gu jin shuo hai). The Ming version was described as "muddled and jumbled up, six or seven tenths of it missing, barely constituting a book at all". The Yuan dynasty original is no longer extant, and the surviving versions appear to be largely based on the truncated Ming version.

Texts from the book were collected in various other anthologies. Excerpts were given in a lengthy compilation Boundaries of Stories (說郛, Shuo fu), in a second version was published in early Qing dynasty. Truncated text was also given in Anecdotal Histories Old and New (古今逸史, Gu jin yi shi) from the Ming dynasty, and this same text was used in other collections. A major modern Chinese version of the book is an annotated edition, which was compiled by Xia Nai from variants of the text found in 13 editions, completed in 1980 and published in 2000.

The work is written in classical Chinese; however, there are occasionally words and sentence structures that appear to have been influenced by Zhou's Wenzhou dialect.

== Translations ==
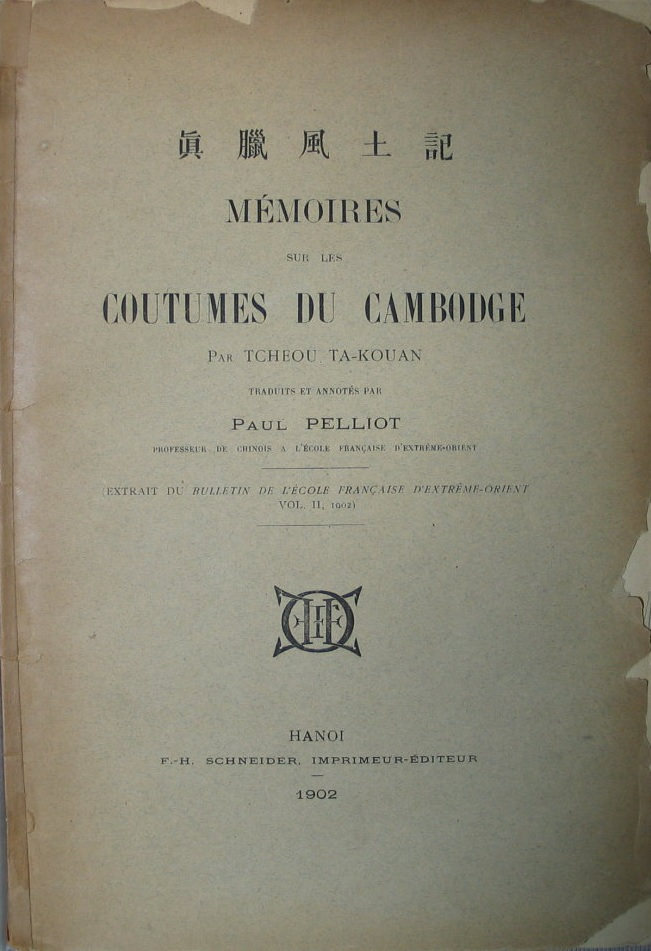
Title page of a 1902 edition of Paul Pelliot's translation Mémoires sur les coutumes du Cambodge de Tcheou Ta-Kouan

Zhou's account was first translated into French in 1819 by Jean-Pierre Abel-Rémusat but it did not have much impact. The text of the book found in the anthology Sea of Stories Old and New was then retranslated into French by Paul Pelliot in 1902, and this translation was later partly revised by Pelliot and republished posthumously in 1951. Pelliot however died before he could complete the comprehensive notes he had planned for Zhou's work. Pelliot's translation is highly regarded and it formed the basis of many later translations into other languages, for example the English translations by J. Gilman d’Arcy Paul in 1967 and Michael Smithies in 2001.

In 1971, it was translated into Khmer by Ly Theam Teng. There is also a Thai translation of The Customs of Cambodia by Chaloem Yongbunkiat in 1967, which has been reprinted by Matichon Press in 2014.

In 2007, Sino-linguist Peter Harris, a Senior Fellow at the Center for Strategic Studies New Zealand, completed the first direct translation from Chinese to modern English, correcting many errors in previous translated English versions, with a new title A Record of Cambodia: the Land and Its People. Harris worked in Cambodia for many years and included modern photographs and maps directly relating to Zhou's original account.

== Content ==
The book gives descriptions of Yasodharapura, the capital city at the center of Angkor, and everyday palace life and protocols. It describes the various customs and religious practices of the country, the role of women and slaves, trade and city life, agriculture, and other aspects of society in Angkor, as well as the presence of Chinese in Cambodia and the war with the Siamese. Also included are descriptions of the flora and fauna of the region, foodstuff, as well as unusual tales.

The descriptions in the book are generally considered to be accurate, but there are also mistakes, for example the local Hindu religious devotees were described erroneously by Zhou in Chinese terms as Confucians or Daoists, and the measurements of length and distance used are often less than exact.

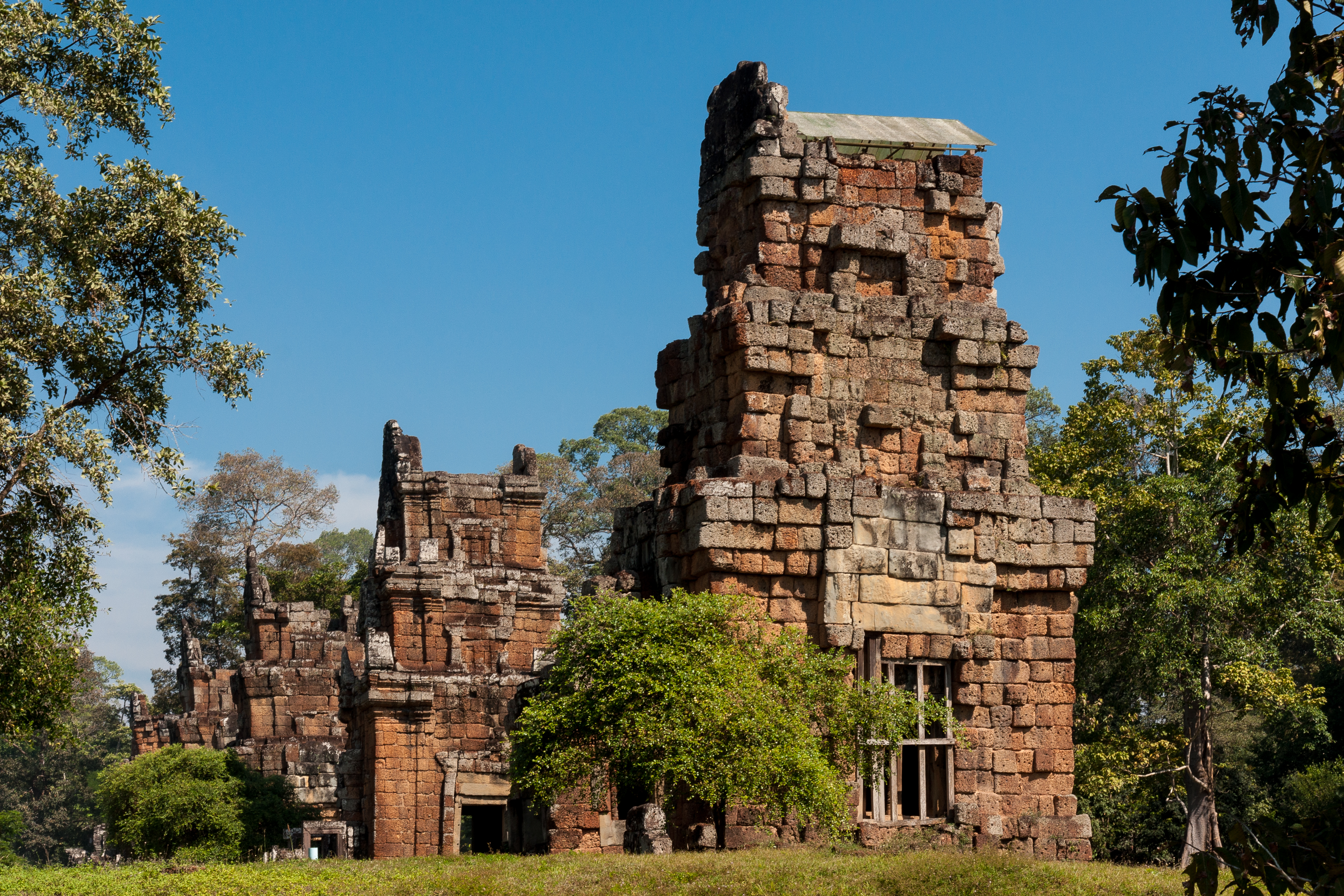
Some of these small stone towers of Prasat Suor Prat

On the Royal Palace:

All official buildings and homes of the aristocracy, including the Royal Palace, face the east. The Royal Palace stands north of the Golden Tower and the Bridge of Gold: it is one and a half mile in circumference. The tiles of the main dwelling are of lead. Other dwellings are covered with yellow-coloured pottery tiles. Carved or painted Buddhas decorate all the immense columns and lintels. The roofs are impressive too. Open corridors and long colonnades, arranged in harmonious patterns, stretch away on all sides.

On Khmer Homes:

The dwellings of the princes and principal officials have a completely different layout and dimensions from those of the people. All the outlying buildings are covered with thatch; only the family temple and the principal apartment can be covered in tiles. The official rank of each person determines the size of the houses.

On a royal procession of Indravarman III:

When the king goes out, troops are at the head of [his] escort; then come flags, banners and music. Palace women, numbering from three to five hundred, wearing flowered cloth, with flowers in their hair, hold candles in their hands, and form a troupe. Even in broad daylight, the candles are lighted. Then come other palace women, bearing royal paraphernalia made of gold and silver... Then come the palace women carrying lances and shields, with the king's private guards. Carts drawn by goats and horses, all in gold, come next. Ministers and princes are mounted on elephants, and in front of them one can see, from afar, their innumerable red umbrellas. After them come the wives and concubines of the king, in palanquins, carriages, on horseback and on elephants. They have more than one hundred parasols, flecked with gold. Behind them comes the sovereign, standing on an elephant, holding his sacred sword in his hand. The elephant's tusks are encased in gold.

On the king's wardrobe:

Only the ruler can dress in cloth with an all-over floral design…Around his neck he wears about three pounds of big pearls. At his wrists, ankles and fingers he has gold bracelets and rings all set with cat's eyes…When he goes out, he holds a golden sword [of state] in his hand.

On the dress:

From the king down, the men and women all wear their hair wound up in a knot, and go naked to the waist, wrapped only in a cloth. When they are out and about they wind a larger piece of cloth over the small one.

There are very many different grades of cloth. The materials the king wears include some that are extremely elegant and beautiful, and worth three or four ounces of gold a piece. Although cloth is woven domestically, it also comes from Siam and Champa. Cloth from the Western Seas is often regarded as the best because it is so well-made and refined.

On silk production:

None of the locals produces silk. Nor do the women know how to stitch and darn with a needle and thread. The only thing they can do is weave cotton from kapok. Even then they cannot spin the yarn, but just use their hands to gather the cloth into strands. They do not use a loom for weaving. Instead they just wind one end of the cloth around their waist, hang the other end over a window, and use a bamboo tube as a shuttle.

In recent years people from Siam have come to live in Cambodia, and unlike the locals they engage in silk production. The mulberry trees they grow and the silkworms they raise all come from Siam. (They have no ramie, either, only hemp.) They themselves weave the silk into clothes made of a black, patterned satiny silk. Siamese women do know how to stitch and darn, so when local people have torn or damaged clothing they ask them to do the mending.

On judgment:

In front of the palace there are twelve small stone towers. When two men dispute over some unknown matter, each of the contestants is forced to sit in one of them while the relatives stand watch at the base. After three or four days, he who is wrong shows it by suffering some illness - ulcers, or catarrh, or malignant fever - while the other remains in perfect health. Thus right or wrong is determined by what is called divine judgment.

On the Army:

The soldiers, too, go naked and barefoot. In their right hand they carry a lance, and in their left hand a shield. They have nothing that could be called bows and arrows, trebuchets, body armor, helmets, or the like. I have heard reports that when the Siamese attacked, all the ordinary people were ordered out to do battle, often with no good strategy or preparation.

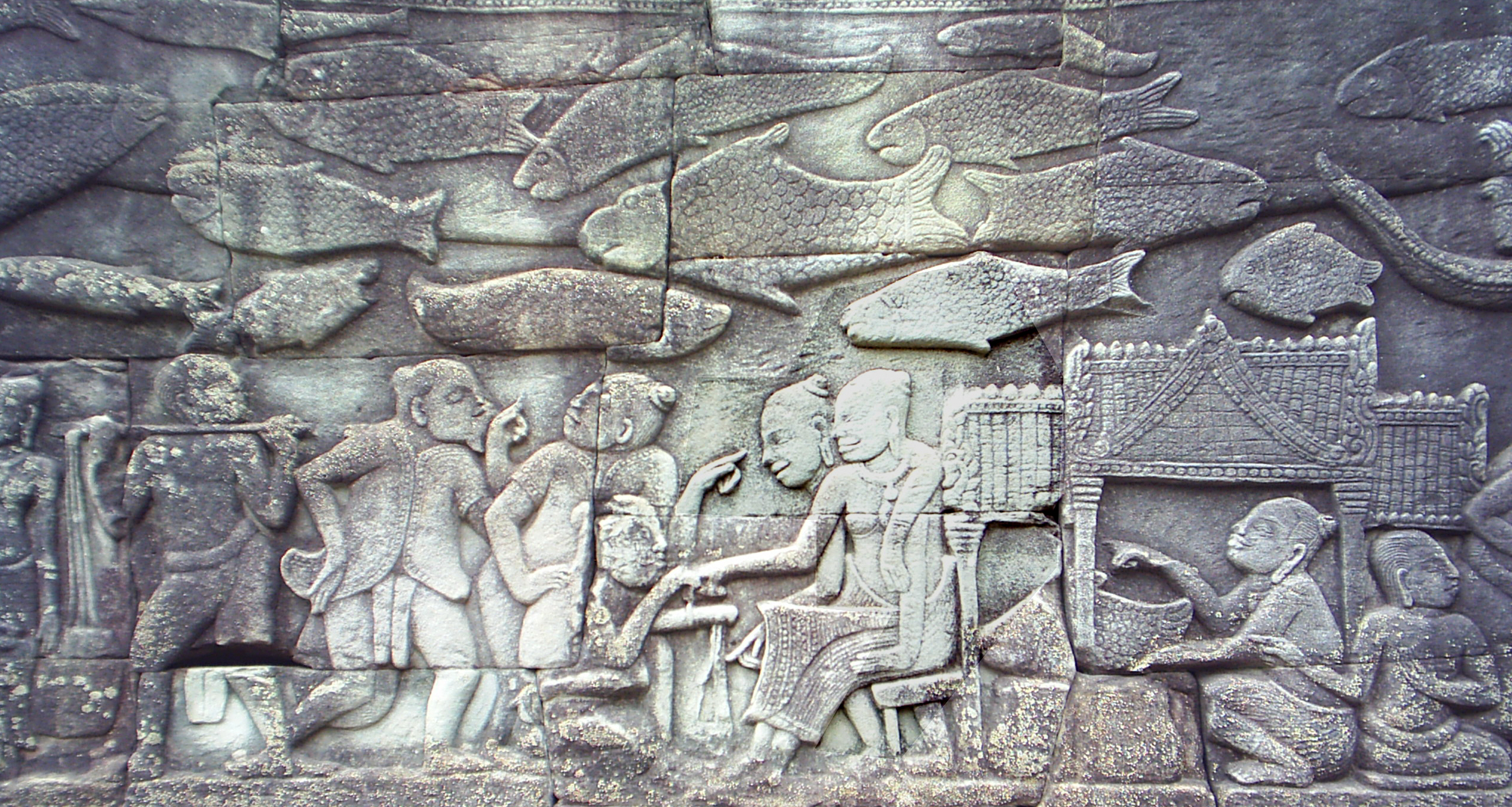
A market scene of the Bayon shows women weighing goods

On the women of Angkor:

The local people who know how to trade are all women. So when a Chinese goes to this country, the first thing he must do is take in a woman, partly with a view to profiting from her trading abilities.

The women age very quickly, no doubt because they marry and give birth when too young. When they are twenty or thirty years old, they look like Chinese women who are forty or fifty.

Priests from Angkor performed costly ritual ceremonies to break the hymen of young girls as a mark to adulthood and sexual activity

=== Calendar ===
Zhou's account is very useful for determining that the 1st month of the Khmer calendar was "kia-to", called Karttika. None of the Khmer inscriptions uses month numbering, but of the three systems used later in Thailand, Karttika was called month 1 in parts of Lanna and was also sometimes so numbered in Laos. The astronomical new year, on the other hand, began in what would have been numbered month 6 (Caitra). This equation is confirmed when Zhou Daguan says he does not understand why they intercalate only in (their) month 9. On the scale being used here the 9th month is Ashadha, the only intercalary month in Thailand and Laos. (Ashadha is better known as 'month 8' since that is its Southern (Bangkok) equivalence).

The use in Cambodia of Ashadha as the only intercalary month is not otherwise securely attested until the 1620s AD when a year (Saka 1539; IMA no. 9) is said to have a 2nd Ashadha when the old system did not have an extra month in that year. The inscription record between 1296 AD and 1617 AD is very patchy, but such records as survive from the first part of this interval appear to favour the older system of reckoning, suggesting that Zhou Daguan's informants were at the time of his visit in the minority.
