= Zhou Daguan =

Chinese diplomat of the Yuan dynasty

- Traditional Chinese: 周達觀
- Simplified Chinese: 周达观
Transcriptions
Standard Mandarin
- Hanyu Pinyin: Zhōu Dáguān
- Wade–Giles: Chou^{1} Ta^{2}-kuan^{1}
- IPA: [ʈʂóʊ tǎ.kwán]
Yue: Cantonese
- Yale Romanization: Jāu Daaht-Gūn
- Jyutping: Zau1 Daat6-Gun1
- IPA: [tsɐw˥ tat̚˨.kun˥]

Zhou Daguan (Wade–Giles: Chou Ta-kuan; French: Tcheou Ta-Kouan; c. 1270–?) was a Chinese diplomat of the Mongol-led Yuan dynasty, serving under Temür Khan (Emperor Chengzong of Yuan). He is most well known for his accounts of the customs of Cambodia and the Angkor temple complexes during his visit there. He arrived at Angkor in August 1296, and remained at the court of King Indravarman III until July 1297. He was neither the first nor the last Chinese representative to visit the Khmer Empire. However, his stay is notable because he later wrote a detailed report on life in Angkor, The Customs of Cambodia (Chinese: 真臘風土記; pinyin: Zhenla fengtu ji). His portrayal is today one of the most important sources of understanding of historical Angkor and the Khmer Empire. Alongside descriptions of several great Buddhist temples, such as the Bayon, the Baphuon, Angkor Wat, and others, the text also offers valuable information on the everyday life and the habits of the inhabitants of Angkor.

== Biography ==
Zhou was a native of Yongjia, a name often used in Zhou's time for modern Wenzhou, Zhejiang. He had also been referred to as Zhou Jianguan (周建觀) and Zhou Dake (周達可) in other historical records. He used the assumed name of Thatched Courtyard Recluse (Cao ting yimin, 草庭逸民) in his later life.

=== Diplomatic mission to Cambodia ===
Zhou was part of an official delegation sent by Yuan Dynasty Temür Khan in 1296, although official Chinese records made no mention of his mission. On 20 February 1296, Zhou Daguan set sail from Mingzhou (明州, today's Ningbo) in Jiangzhe province (江浙行省, composing modern Zhejiang and some parts of Jiangsu and Anhui), on a compass guided ship, passing the ports of Fuzhou, Guangzhou, Quanzhou (Zaiton), the Island of Hainan, the Seven-Islands Sea (Qizhou yang), the sea off Central Vietnam coast (Jiaozhi Sea), and stopped over in Zhancheng or Champa (today's Qui Nhon). The ship resumed its trip past the province of Zhenpu (Bà Rịa in present-day southeastern Vietnam), through Poulo Condor Sea, then heading north on the Mekong River into Tonle Sap River reaching the town of Kampong Chhnang of Cambodia; from there he boarded a small boat, sailing for a dozen days, through Tonle Sap Lake arriving at Yaśodharapura (Angkor Thom), the capital of Cambodia in August.

As part of the diplomatic mission, Zhou was given access to the Royal Palace, although not to the inner palace. He described the palaces and temples, along with the buildings in and around the city. He observed the parades and ceremonies as well as the daily life of the people, and he also travelled outside the capital to the countryside. For much of his stay in Cambodia, he lived in a house near the north gate of Angkor Thom.

Zhou stayed in Cambodia for eleven months, and left in July 1297. He wrote the book The Customs of Cambodia within 15 years of his return, although the exact date of the book's completion is uncertain. Little is known of his life after his return, but he may have lived until the 1350s.

== The Customs of Cambodia ==
The book The Customs of Cambodia was written within 15 years of Zhou's return from Cambodia. The current surviving text is believed to be only around a third of the size of the original.

=== Description of Angkor Thom ===
Zhou wrote that the city had five gates with multiple doorways, one in each compass direction, but in the east two. The city was surrounded by a wide moat crossed by bridges with sculptures of 54 figures pulling a nine-head nāga. On top of the city gate there were five Buddha heads, four of them facing four directions, the one at the centre was covered with gold. "The city is square in shape at each corner; the city gates are guarded, open during the day but closed at night. Dogs and convicts are barred from entering the city".

=== Description of the palace ===
Zhou wrote that the Palace was at the north of the golden bridge and the golden tower, and the Palace faced east. The main hall of the Palace was covered with lead tiles, while the rest had clay tiles.

=== Description of the Khmer people ===
Zhou observed that the upper, middle, and lower class Khmer dressed differently depending on their social class. The peasants, both men and women kept their chests exposed, walked barefoot, and wore only a piece of cloth wrapped around their waists. The common women wore hair ornaments, golden rings or bracelets. Beautiful women were sent to court to serve the king or his royal family at his whim. All trades were carried out by women. The upper class Khmer were dressed elaborately with gold headpiece, jewelries, and long intricately styled dresses. In the market place, there were no buildings, but rather the female vendors sold their wares on large mats spread about ground. The space in the market also required a rent to be paid to the officials. He saw the Khmer people needed no tables or chairs in their homes, no recognisable bowls or buckets. They cooked their food in earthen pots used for boiling rice and for preparing soup. Their ladles were made from coconut shells and soup was then served into a tiny bowl made from woven leaves, which were made waterproof. Zhou mentioned seeing people in Angkor who appeared feminine or didn't conform to traditional gender roles. He referred to them as catamites and observed that they gathered in groups in the market. Zhou noticed that they tried to attract the attention of Chinese men.

He recounted a royal procession of Indravarman III who wielded a sacred sword in his hand:

When the king goes out, troops lead the escort; then come flags, banners and music. Palace women, numbering from three to five hundred, wearing clothes decorated with flowers, with flowers in their hair, hold candles in their hands, and form a troupe. Even in broad daylight, the candles are lit. Then come other palace women, carrying lances and shields; then the king's private guards; then carts drawn by goats and horses, all in gold. Afterwards ministers and princes mounted on elephants, and in front of them one can see, even from afar, their numerous red umbrellas. Next the wives and concubines of the king appear in palanquins, carriages, on horseback and on elephants. They have more than one hundred parasols, speckled with gold. Finally the sovereign arrives, standing on an elephant, brandishing his sacred sword in his hand. His elephant's tusks are encased in gold.

=== Translations ===
Zhou's book was first translated into French by the sinologist Jean-Pierre Abel-Rémusat in 1819, and again by Paul Pelliot in 1902. The Pelliot translation, which was later revised, has been translated into English and German. In 2007, the linguist Peter Harris completed the first direct translation from Chinese to modern English. Harris also draws a series of parallels between the voyage of Zhou and the travels of Marco Polo. Marco Polo was Zhou's contemporary, however, according to Harris, Polo's travels contain a number of unusual omissions that have yet to be fully explained. There is also a Thai translation of The Customs of Cambodia by Chaloem Yongbunkiat in 1967 which has been reprinted by Matichon Press in 2014

Other translation of Zhou's record on Cambodia are also available. A direct translation from an ancient Chinese text into English by a native Chinese (Mrs. Beling Uk) and a native Cambodian (Solang Uk) in 2010. A Cambodian version of the translation by the same authors was published in Phnom-Penh in 2011.

== See also ==
- Customs of Cambodia
