= History of Thai clothing =

Thai traditional costumes vary by city and the ruler of each historical period. Thai clothes can be classified according to six distinct periods of history; beginning with the 13th century. Previously, traditional Thai clothes were worn daily; however, they are now only worn on auspicious functions such as Thai traditional marriage ceremonies.

== Sukhothai ==
Sukhothai clothing style became the fashion in 13-15th century. During the period The city-state of Sukhothai was united other Tai city-states into one kingdom. Sukhothai Men's clothing was a simple full-sleeved top with a long V shape neck and a cloth brace on their shoulders. The loincloth was made of silk with a big metal or golden belt. Women's clothing was a long silk sarong with flowers painted on it. The top normally is a full-sleeved silk cloth. Married women wore one cloth wrapped around the breasts made of silk or other fabric.

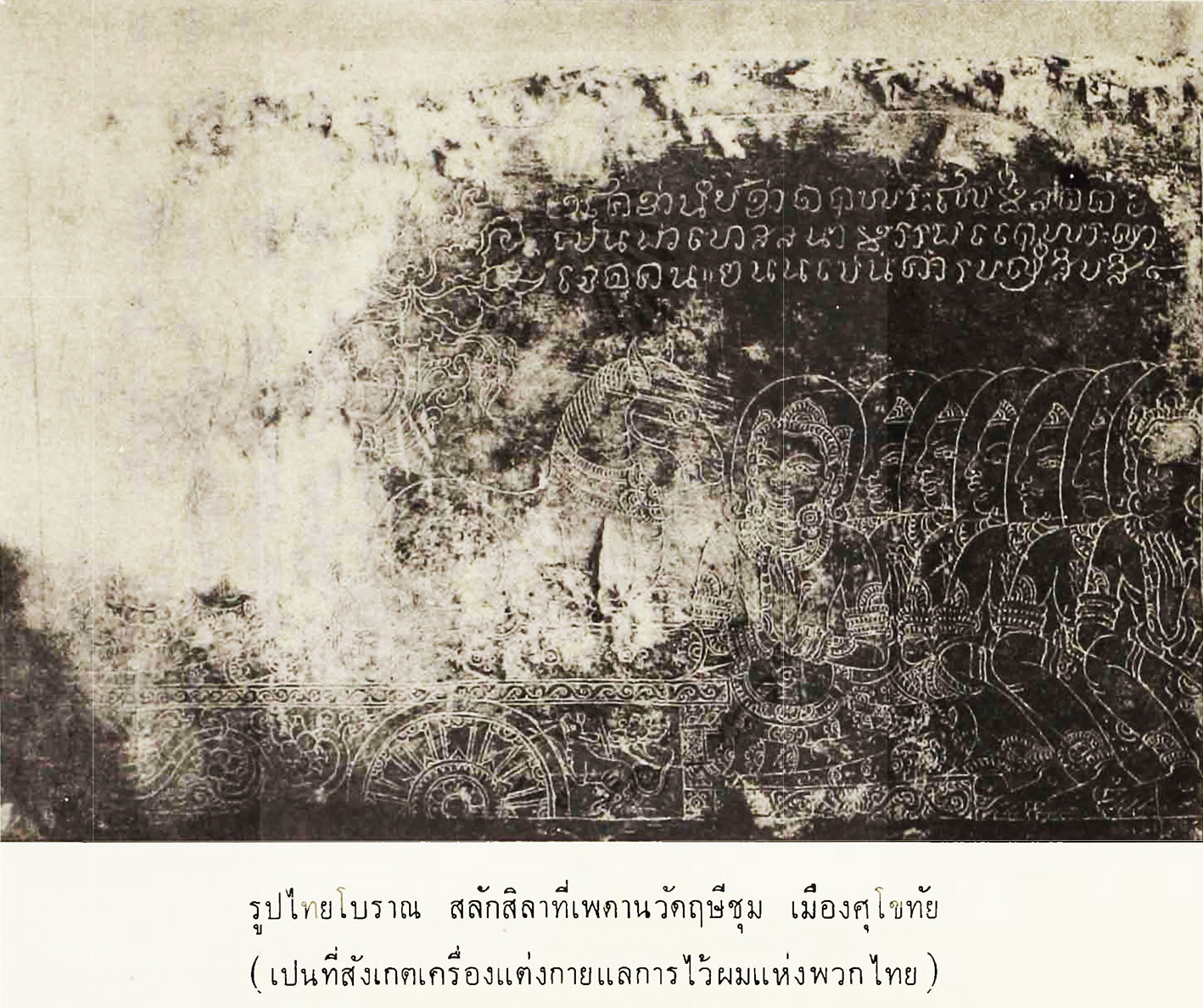
Ancient Thais (clothing and hairstyle) in the Sukhothai era found on the Wat Si Chum stone.

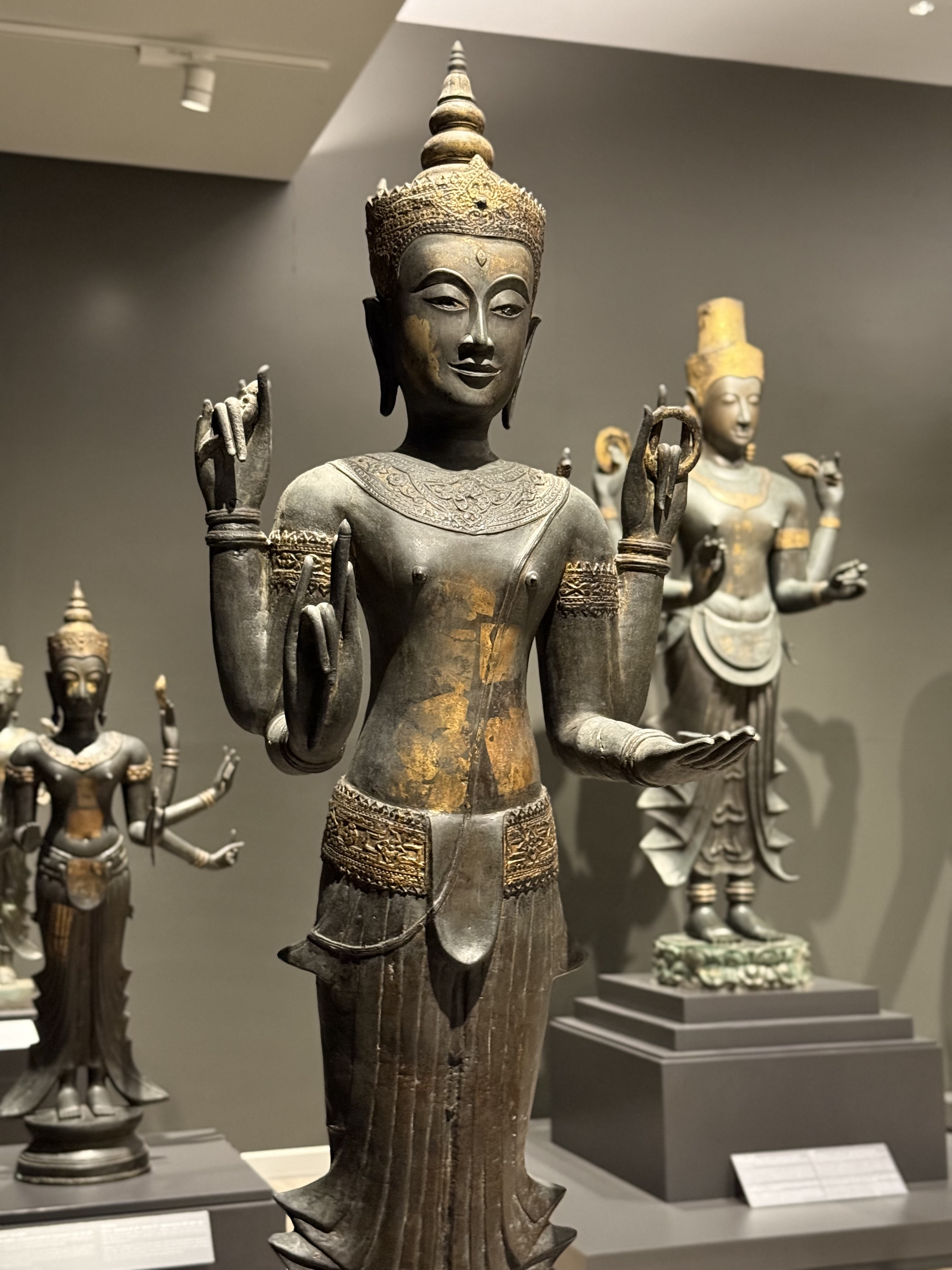
(14th Century), Sukhothai Art, Thailand

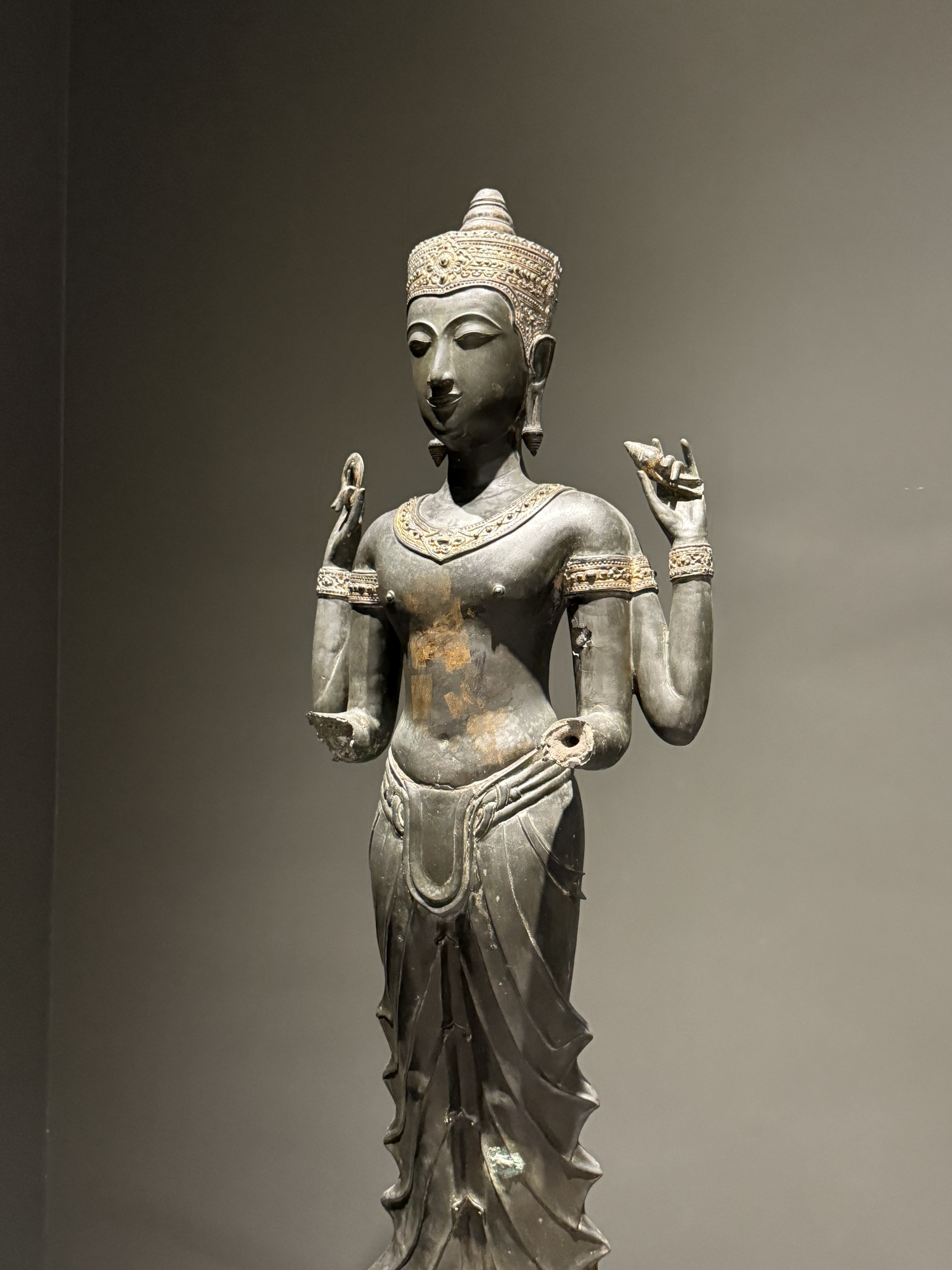
Ancient statue illustrating how kings and queens were traditionally dressed (14th Century), Sukhothai Art, Thailand

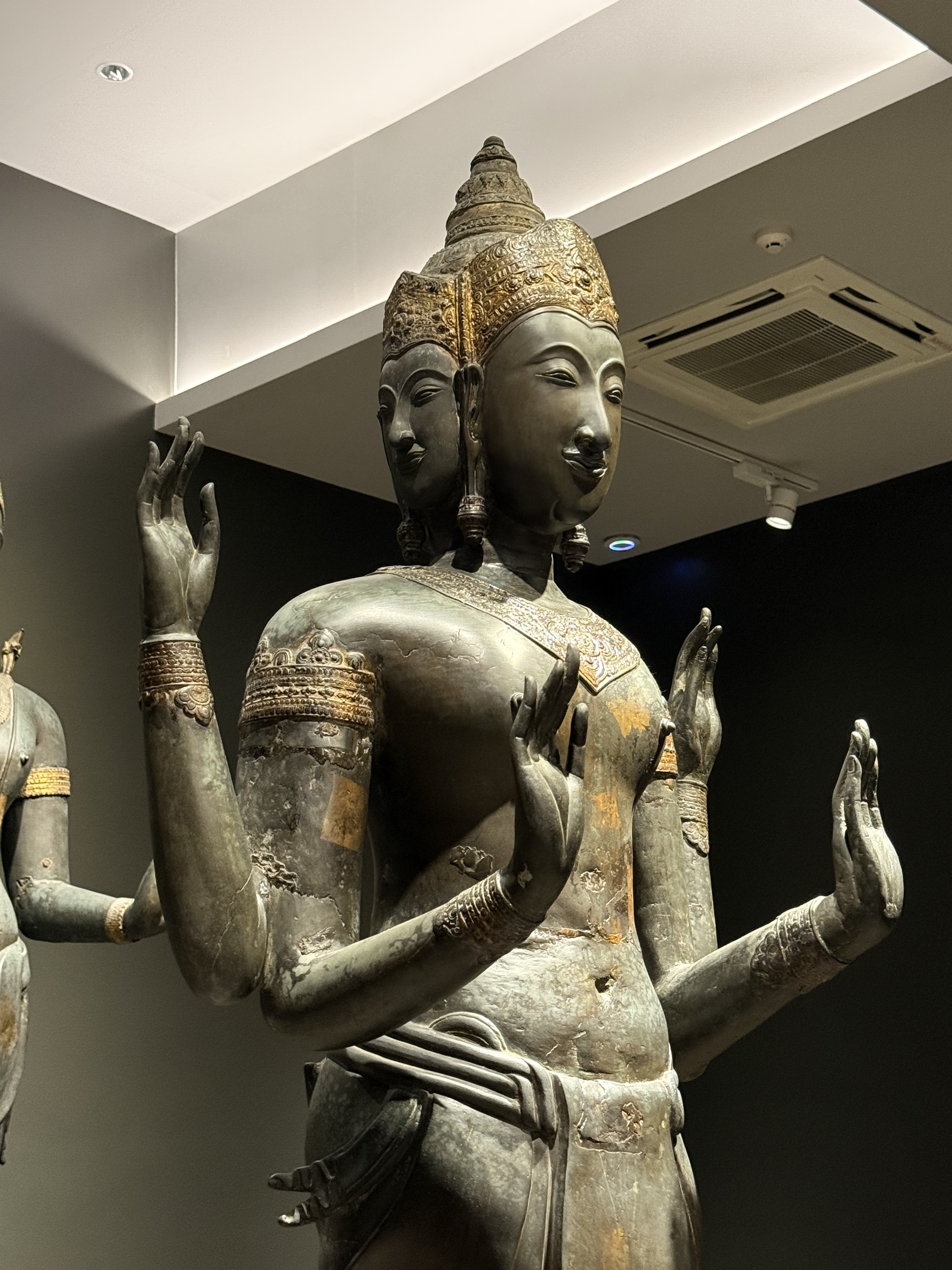
(14th Century), Sukhothai Art, Thailand

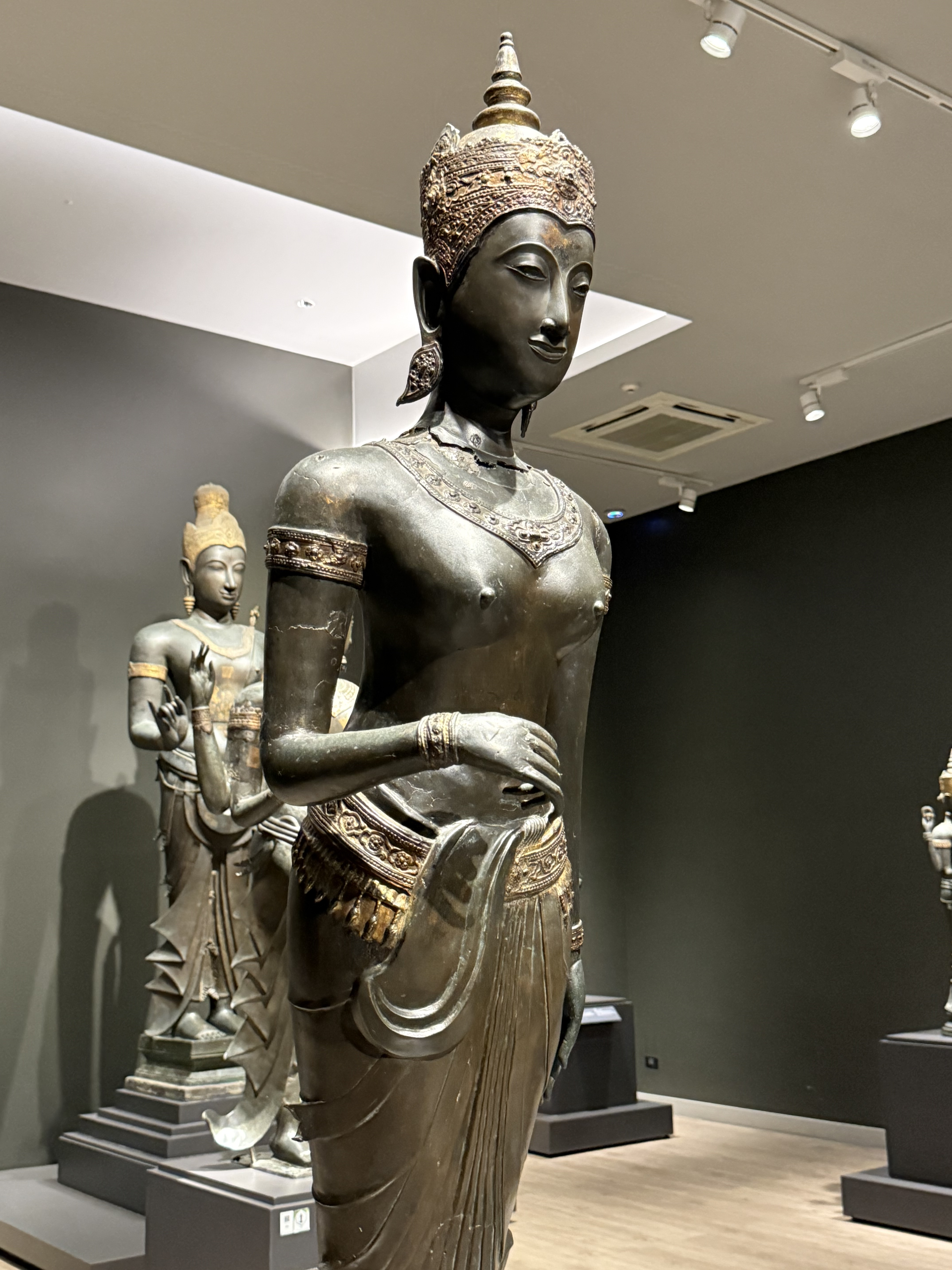
Hindu Deity statue illustrating how gods, kings and queens were traditionally dressed (14th Century), Sukhothai Art, Thailand

== Ayutthaya ==
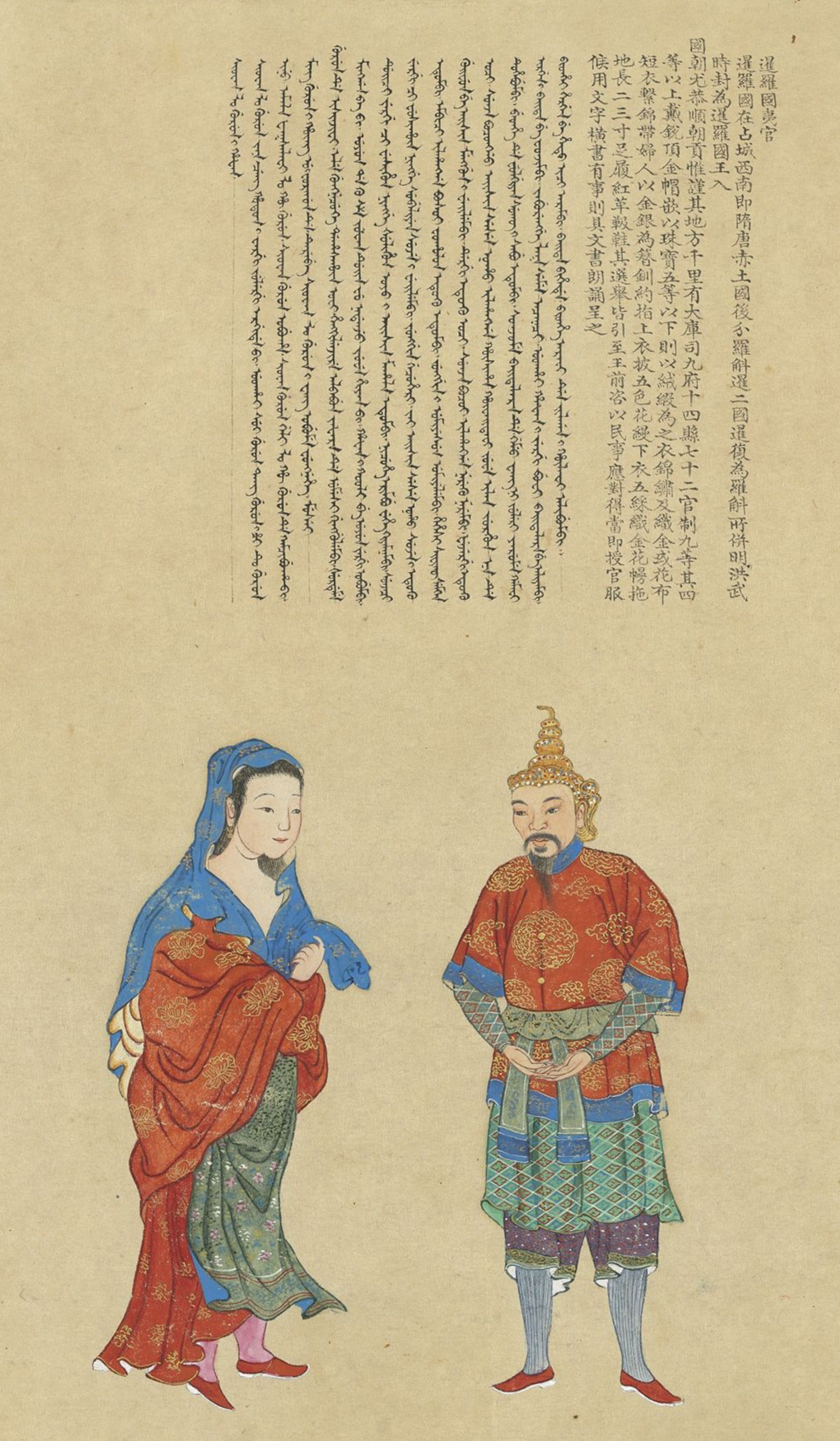
Portrait of Siamese State Officials, one of portrait paintings collection in The Portraits of Periodical Offering of Imperial Qing by Xie Sui, 18th century painting in the National Palace Museum, Taipei.

Ayutthaya clothing was the style during the 14-18th centuries. Ayutthaya city was the capital of Thai kingdom for 417 years, the longest period of Thailand that was ruled under one monarch. Many styles clothing followed the period of Ayutthaya but the fashion changed frequently under the influence from various countries who come into contact and trading with the kingdom.

=== Record of Clothing Styles in the Early Ayutthaya Period ===
The Chinese book Daoyi Zhilüe, which aligns with the record of the Chinese traveler Ma Huan who visited Ayutthaya in 1421/22 , describes the Siam or Ayutthaya people, both men and women, dressing in the same way as the Lavo: they wore their hair in a bun, wrapped it with a cotton turban, and wore a long shirt.

=== General Ayutthaya Period Clothing Styles ===
Historically, both Thai males and females dressed themselves with a loincloth wrap called chong kraben. Men wore their chong kraben to cover the waist to halfway down the thigh, while women covered the waist to well below the knee. Bare chests and bare feet were accepted as part of the Thai formal dress code, and is observed in murals, illustrated manuscripts, and early photographs up to the middle of the 19th century. In the royal court, royalty and nobility men are wearing lomphok, a tall pointed hat, made of white cloth wrapped around a bamboo frame, and Khrui, a light outer garment worn as a gown or robe in certain ceremonial settings. Traditional Thai attire has changed significantly throughout the Rattanakosin period.

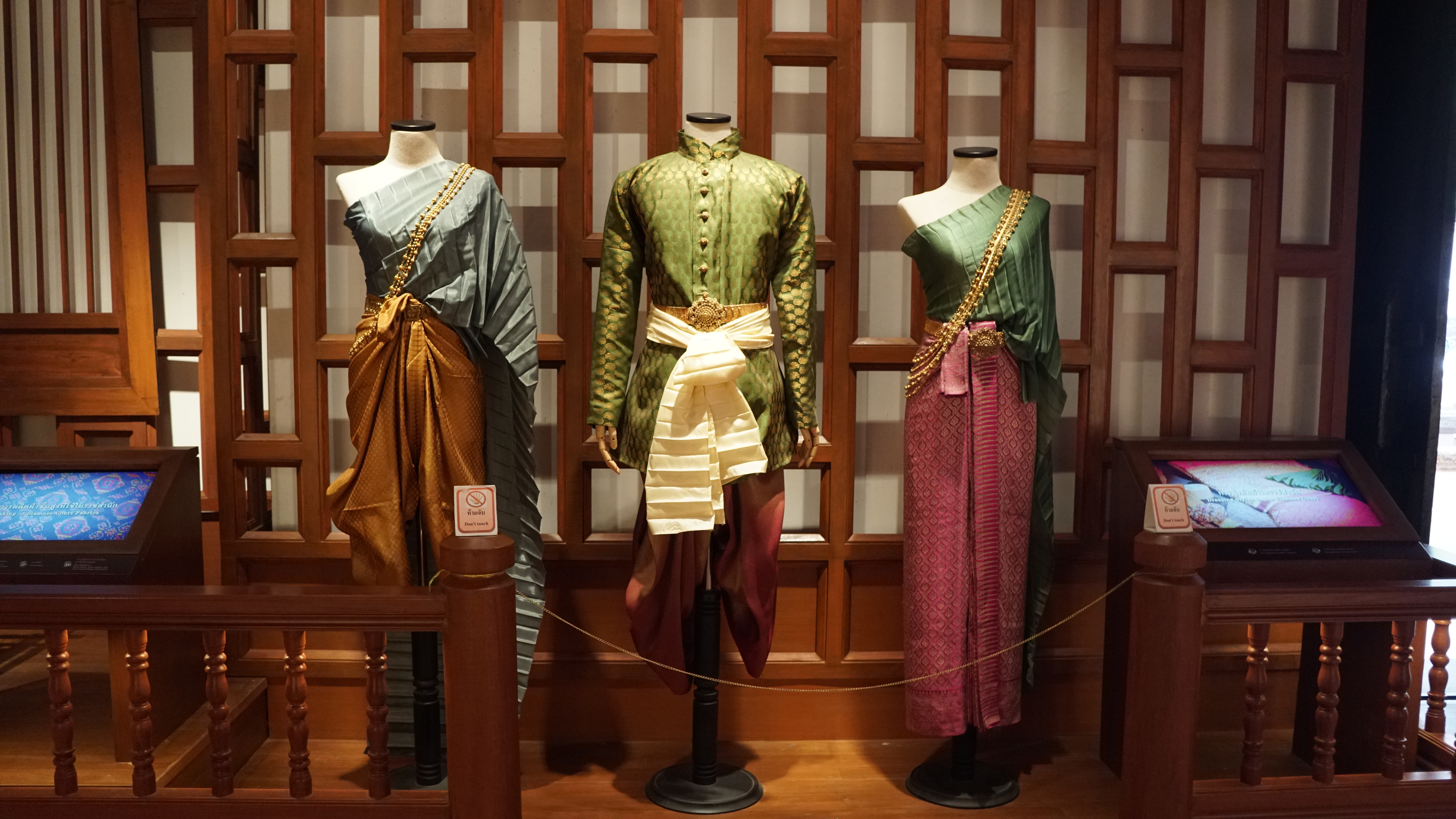
Thai traditional costumes in Bangkok National Museum

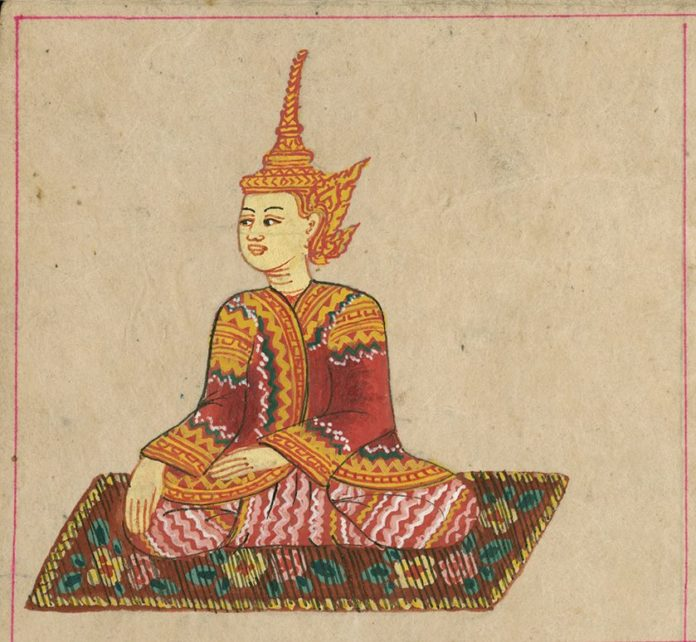
A Burmese depiction of an Ayutthaya king, either depicting Uthumphon or Ekkathat

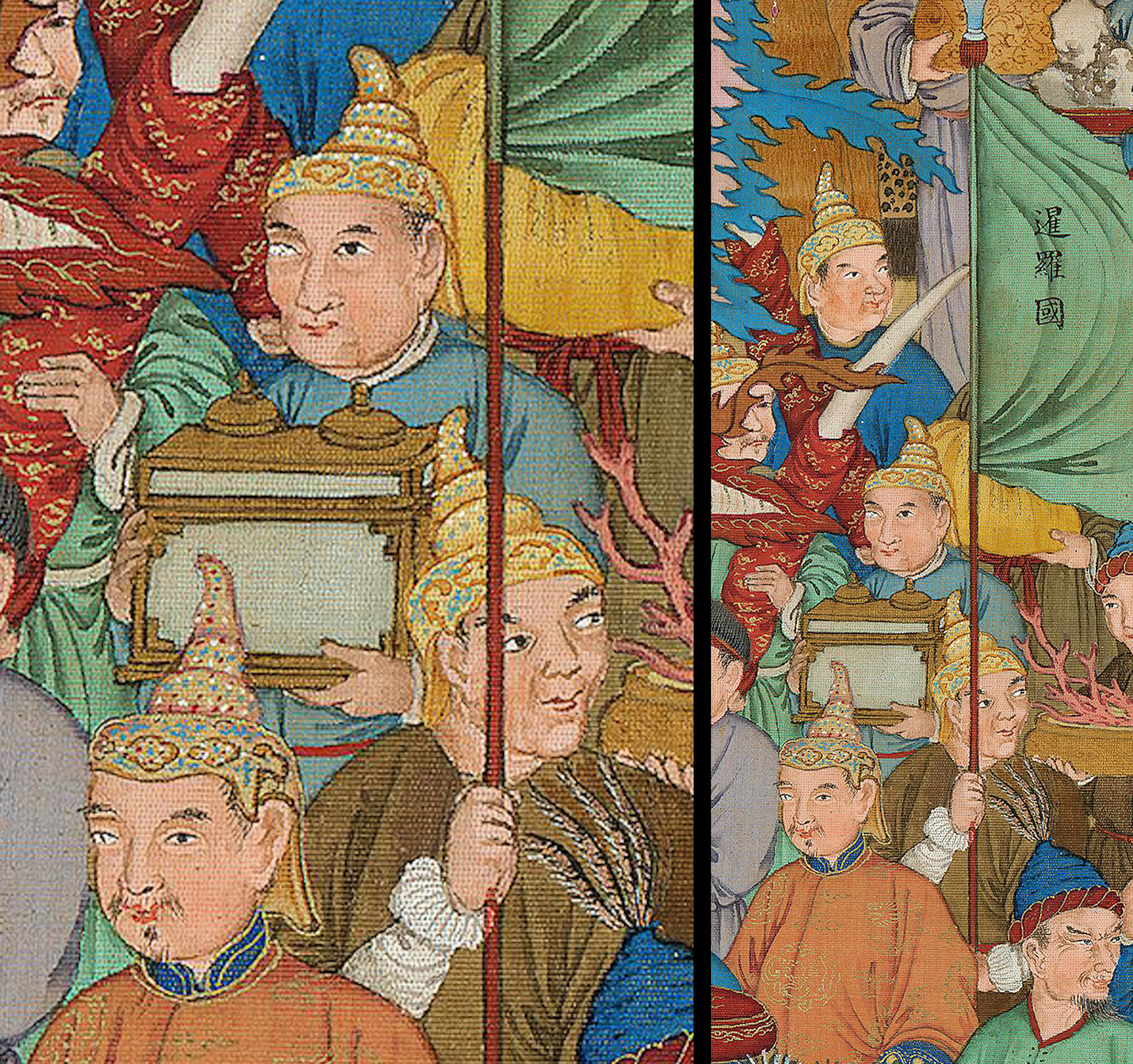
Siam delegates in Peking in 1761 from the Ten Thousand Nations Coming to Pay Tribute monumental painting

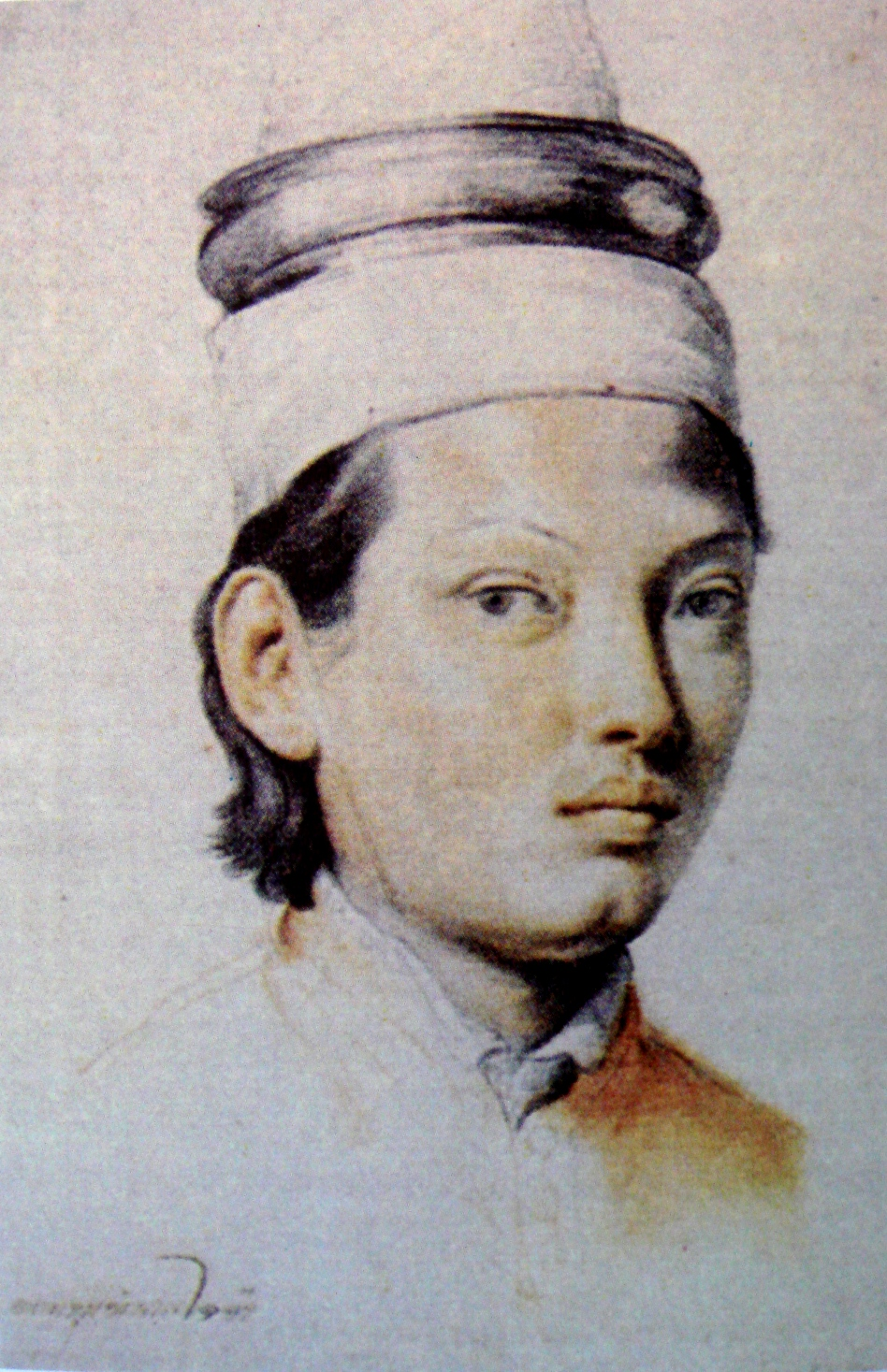
Ok-khun Chamnan, a 17th-century Siamese ambassador who visited France and Rome on an embassy in 1688

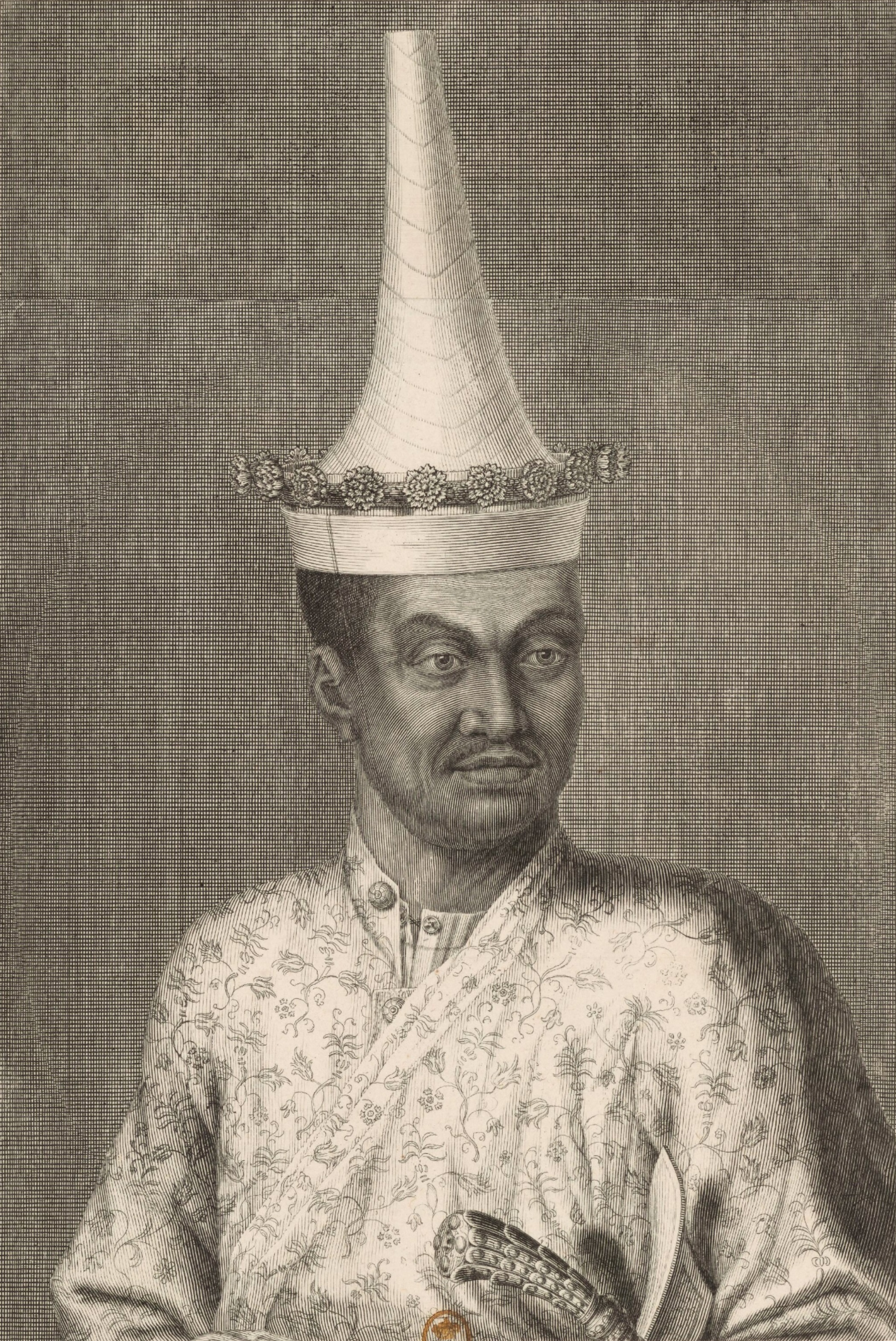
The Ayutthayan official Kosa Pan wearing Lomphok and Khrui

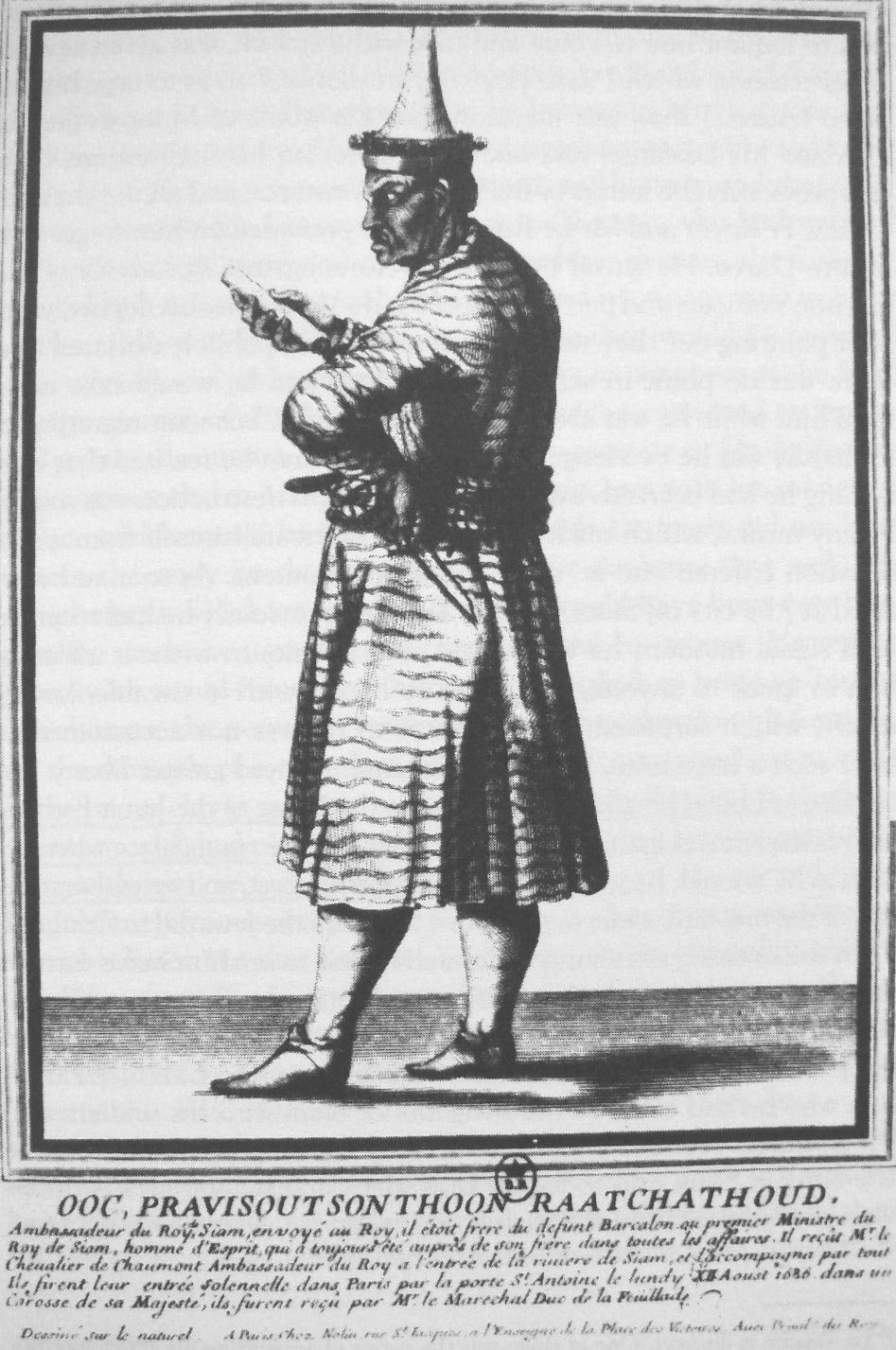
Kosa Pan wearing lomphok and Khrui, 1686

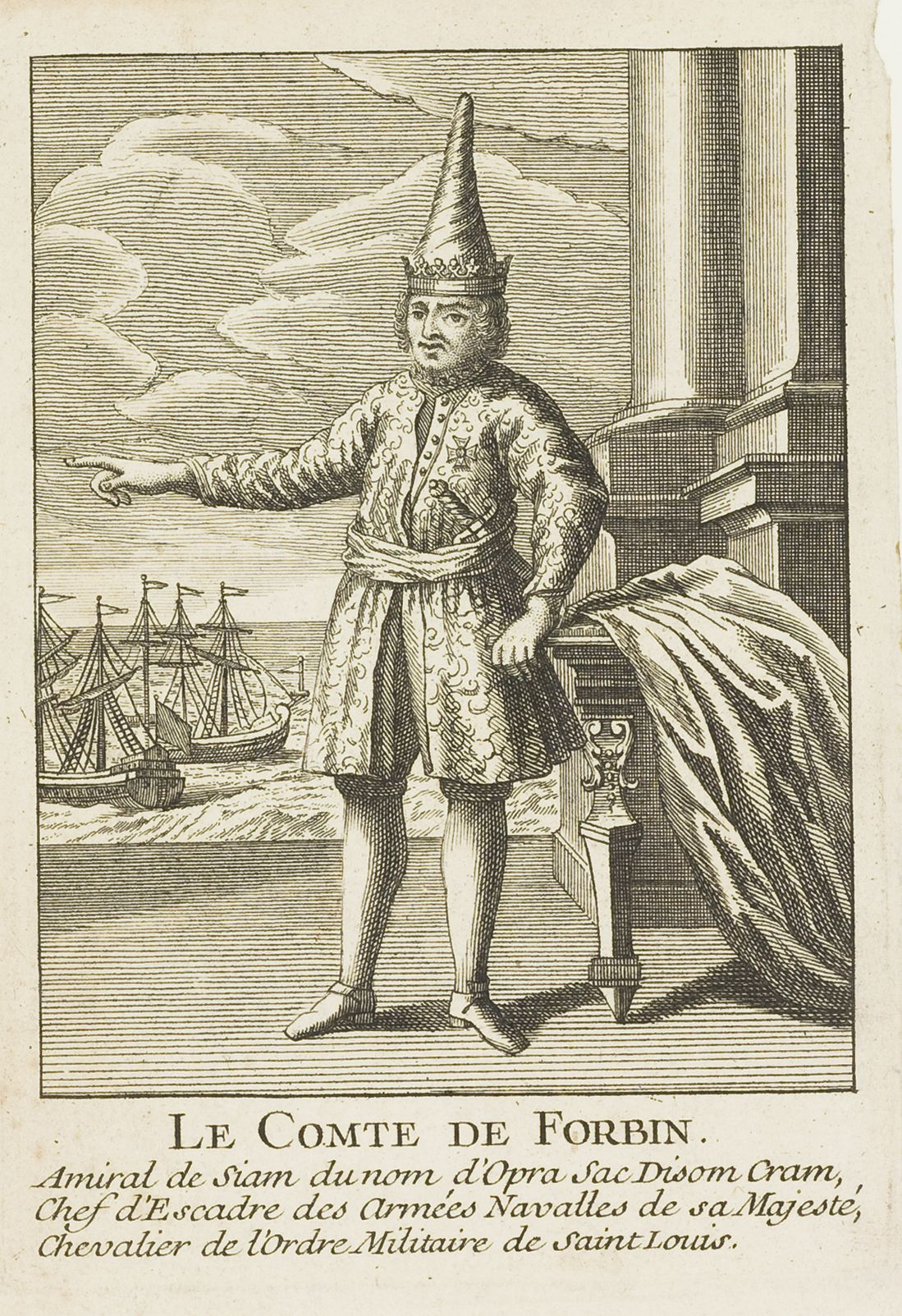
Claude de Forbin wearing Ayutthayan mandarin dress

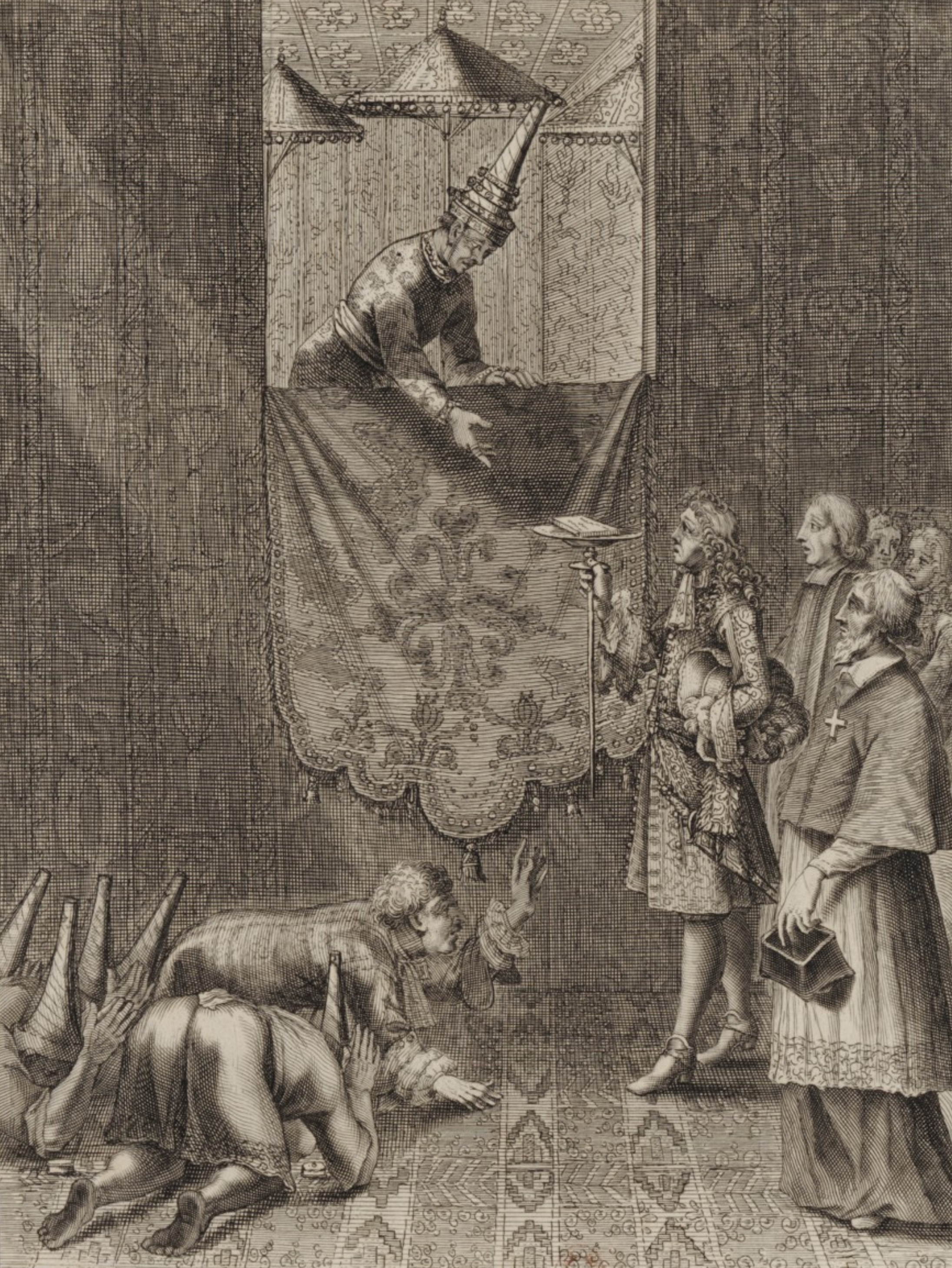
The French ambassador Chevalier de Chaumont presents a letter from Louis XIV to King Narai, 1685

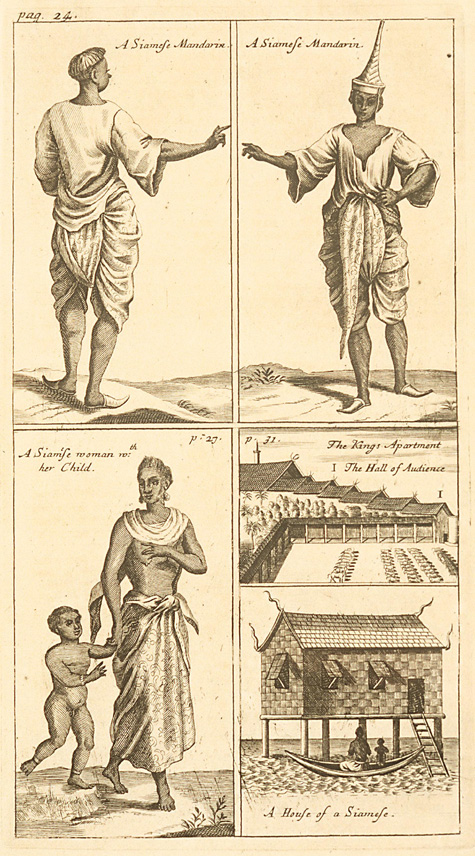
A Siamese official wearing Lomphok and Chong kraben, Lifestyle of Siamese people and Traditional Thai house by Simon de La Loubère

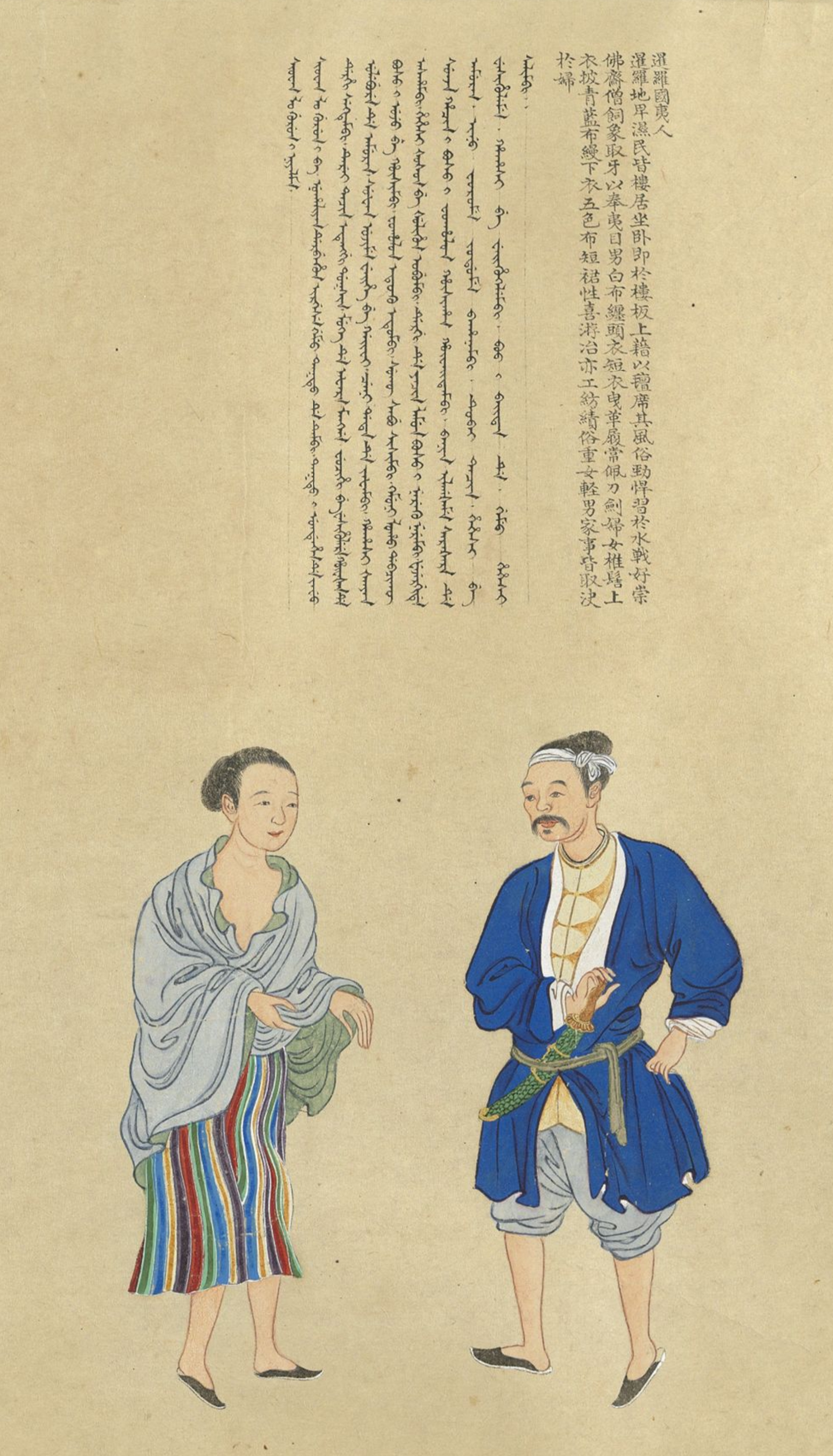
Portrait of Siamese aristocrats from The Portraits of Periodical Offering of Imperial Qing by Xie Sui

== Rattanakosin ==
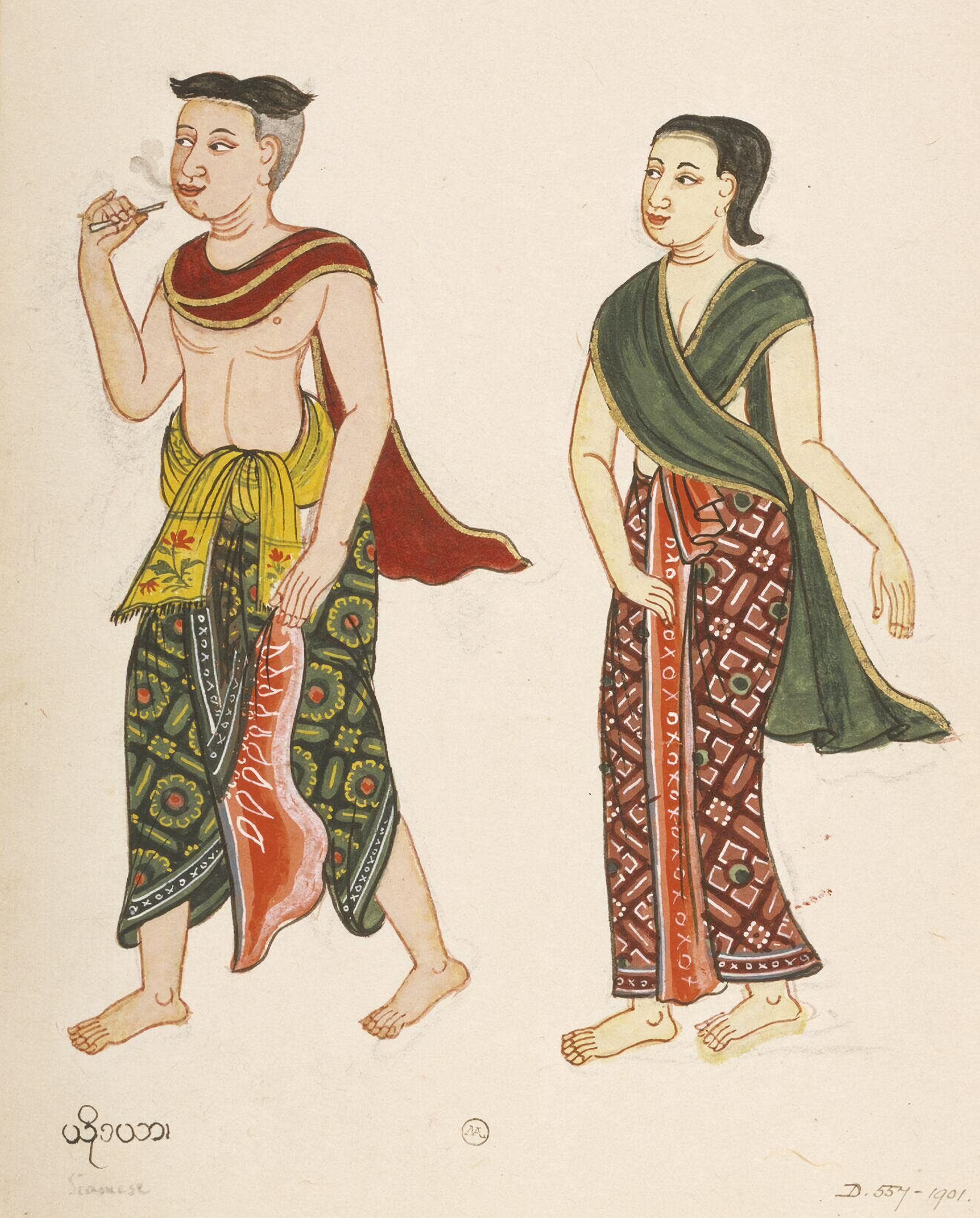
Drawing of a Siamese (Thai) man and woman in traditional dress. Made around 1887 by an unknown Burmese artist

=== Early Rattanakosin ===
Early Rattanakosin central Thais dressed as same as Ayutthaya period, however, after the Second Fall of Ayutthaya and repeated Burmese invasions, central Thai women began cutting their hair in a crew-cut short style, which remained the national hairstyle until the 1900s. Prior to the 20th century, the primary markers that distinguished class in Thai clothing were the use of cotton and silk cloths with printed or woven motifs, but both commoners and royals alike wore wrapped, not stitched clothing.

Men's clothing

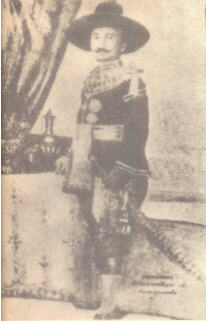
Binnya Sein or Chaophraya Mahayotha, the commander of Mon regiment during the reign of King Rama I in the 1800s

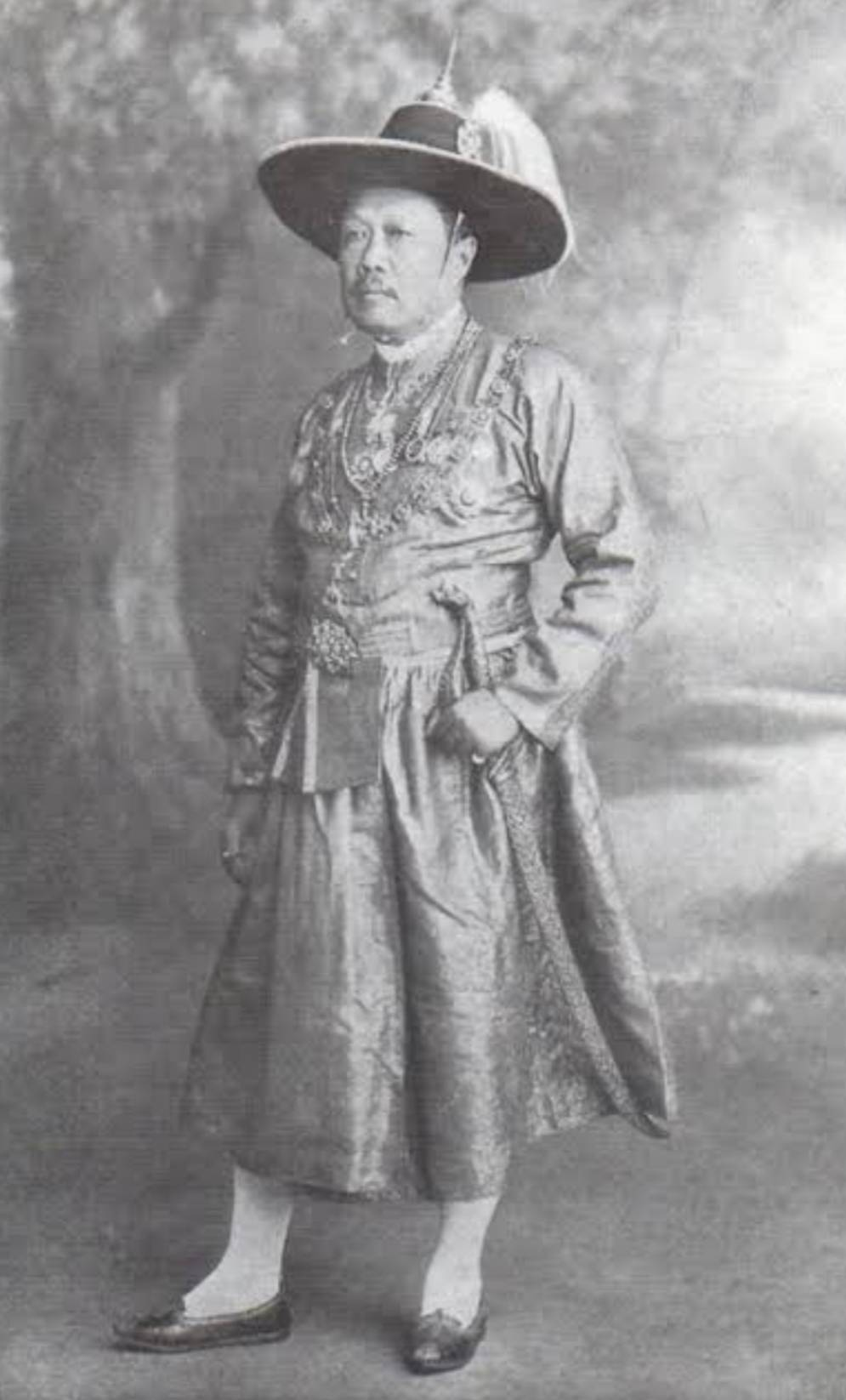
Prince Svasti Sobhana, the son of King Mongkut (Rama IV) wearing the royal costumes of the early Rattanakosin period

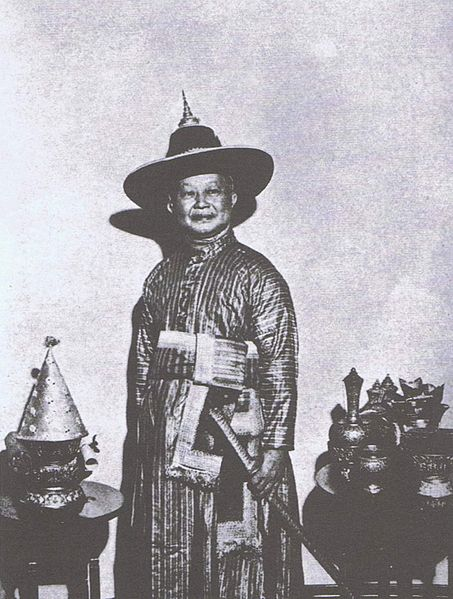
Prince Nakkhatra Mangala, was the eldest son of Prince Kitiyakara Voralaksana wearing the royal costumes of the early Rattanakosin period

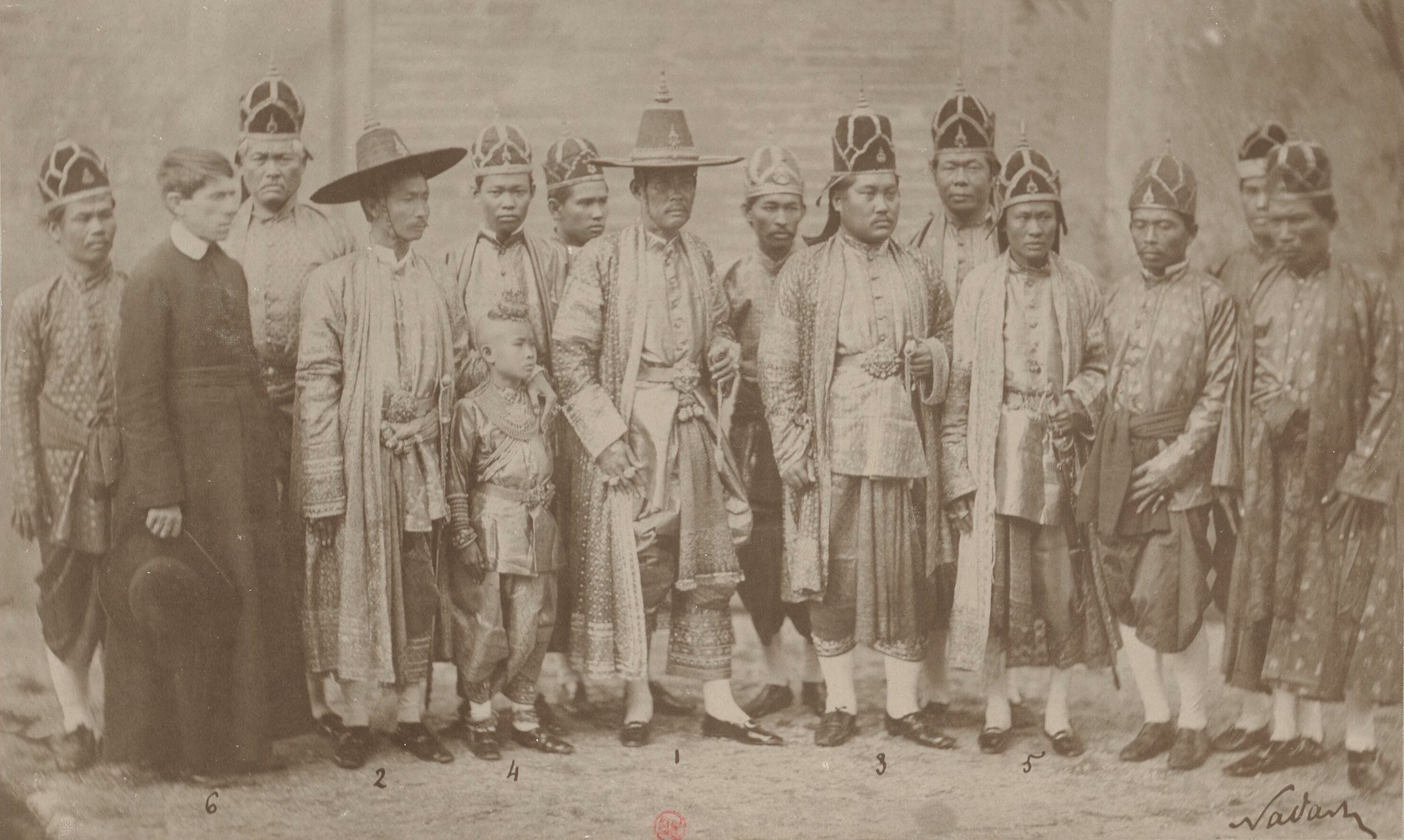
Photograph of the Siamese embassy to France in 1861, wearing the formal clothing of the early Rattanakosin period

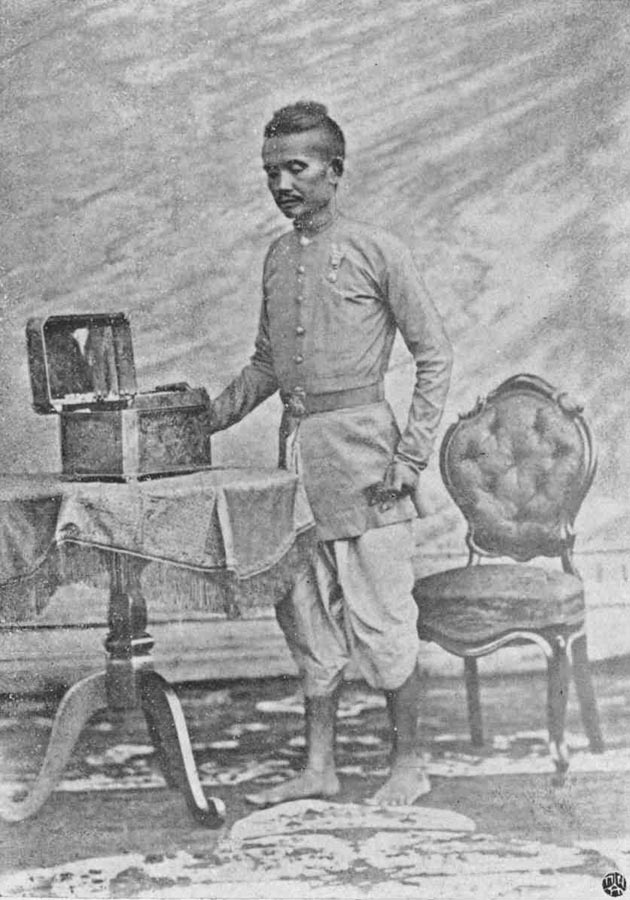
Prince Ammarit, the son of King Nangklao (Rama III), before 1870

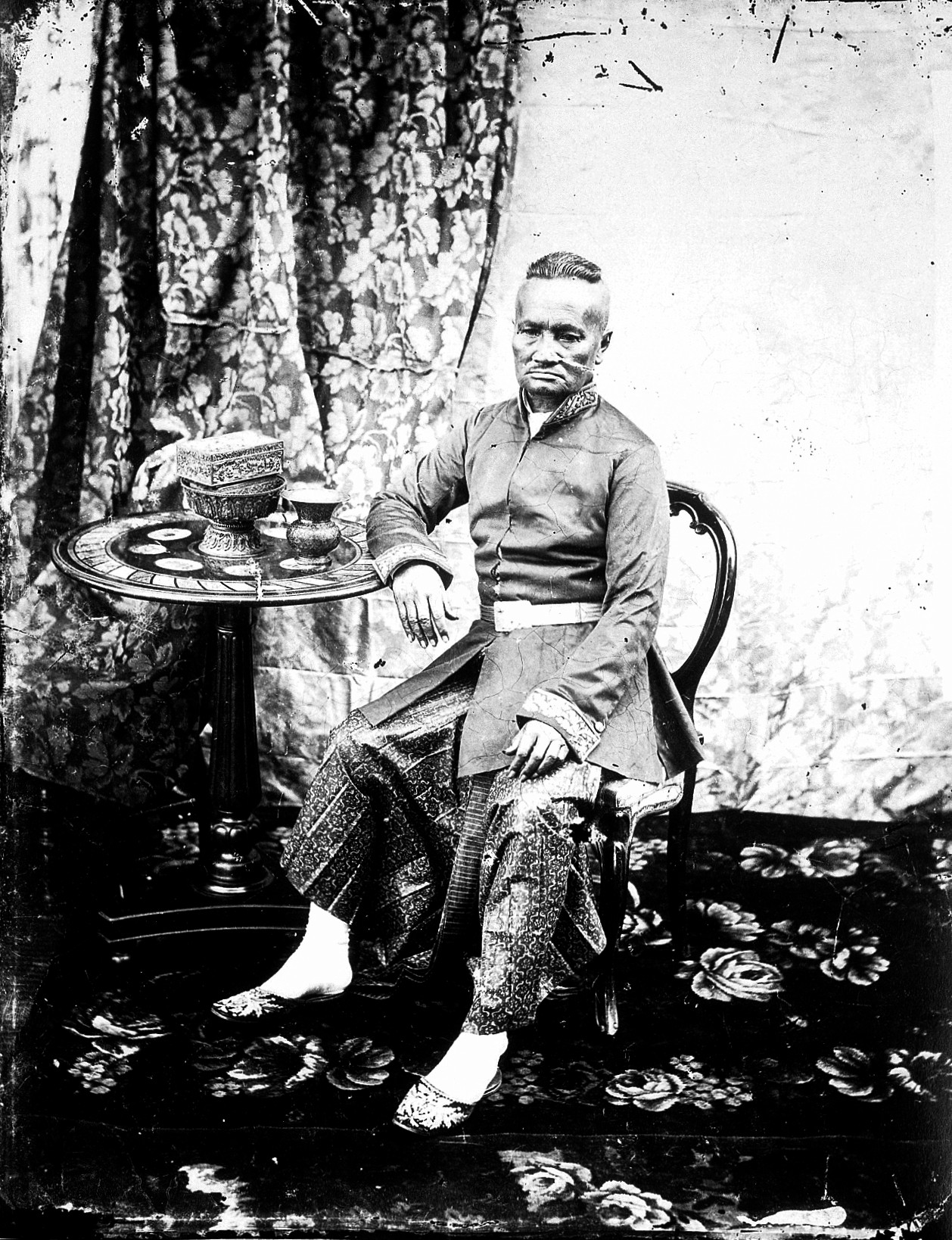
Sri Suriyawongse was a Prime Minister of Southern Siam during the reign of King Chulalongkorn (Rama V), 1865

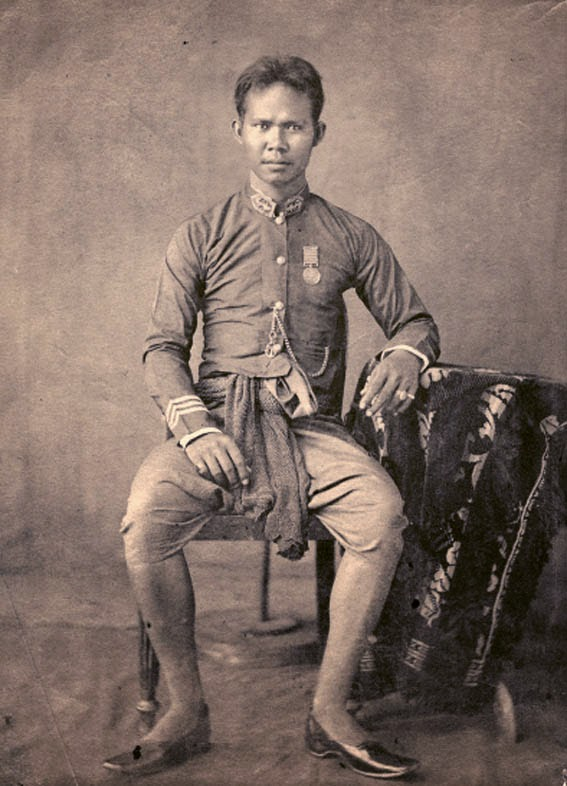
Prince Yodyingyot, later Bowon Wichaichan with the early Rattanakosin style clothing, before 1885

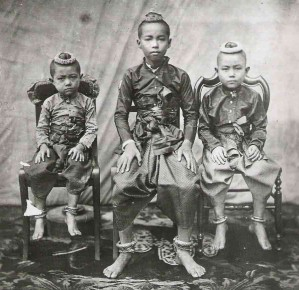
Young Prince Chulalongkorn (Rama V) and his two younger brother in 1851

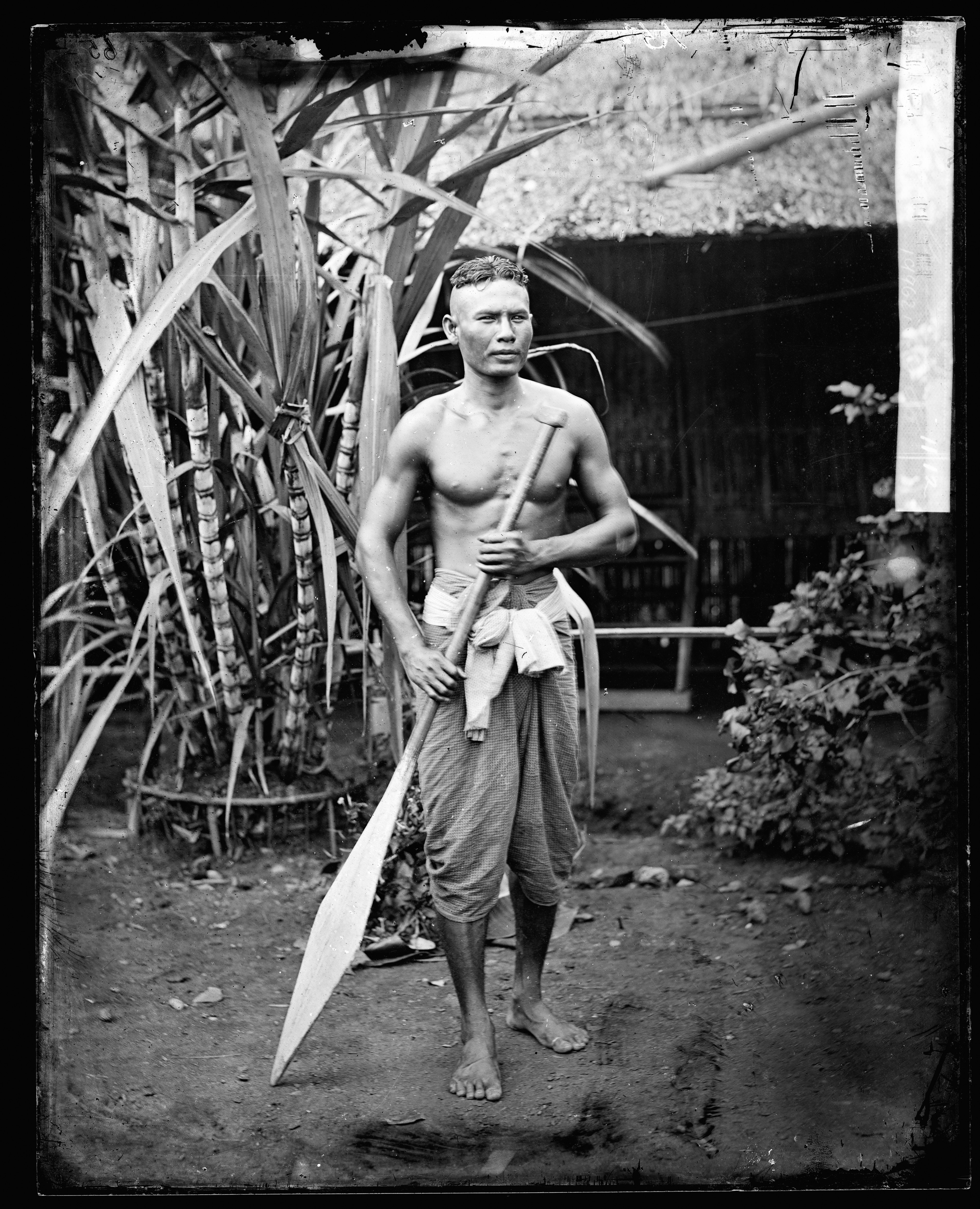
Photograph of a 19th-century Siamese boatman by John Thomson

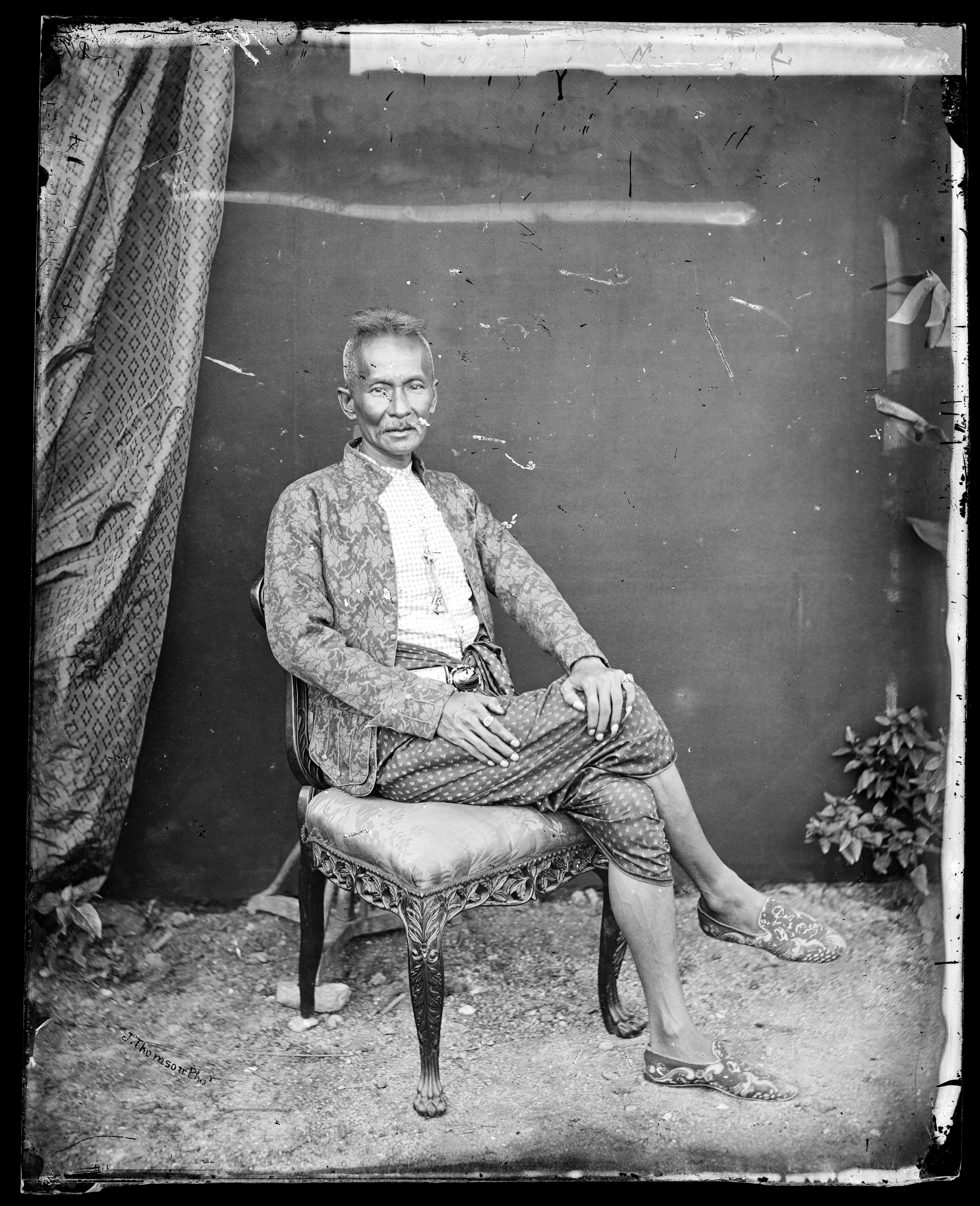
Mom Rachothai, Mom Rajawongse Kratai Isrankura

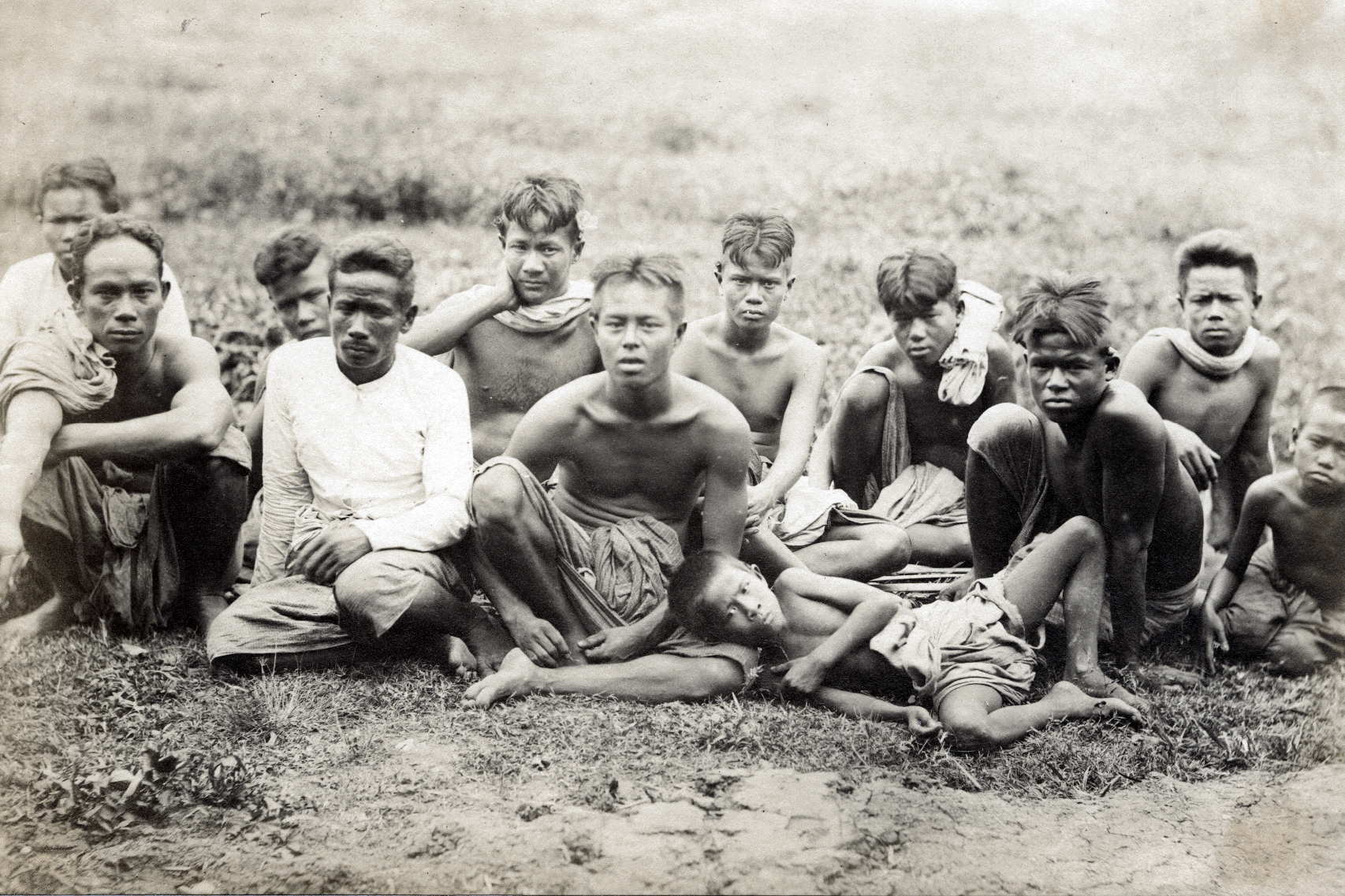
Thai men squat with the early Rattanakosin style clothing

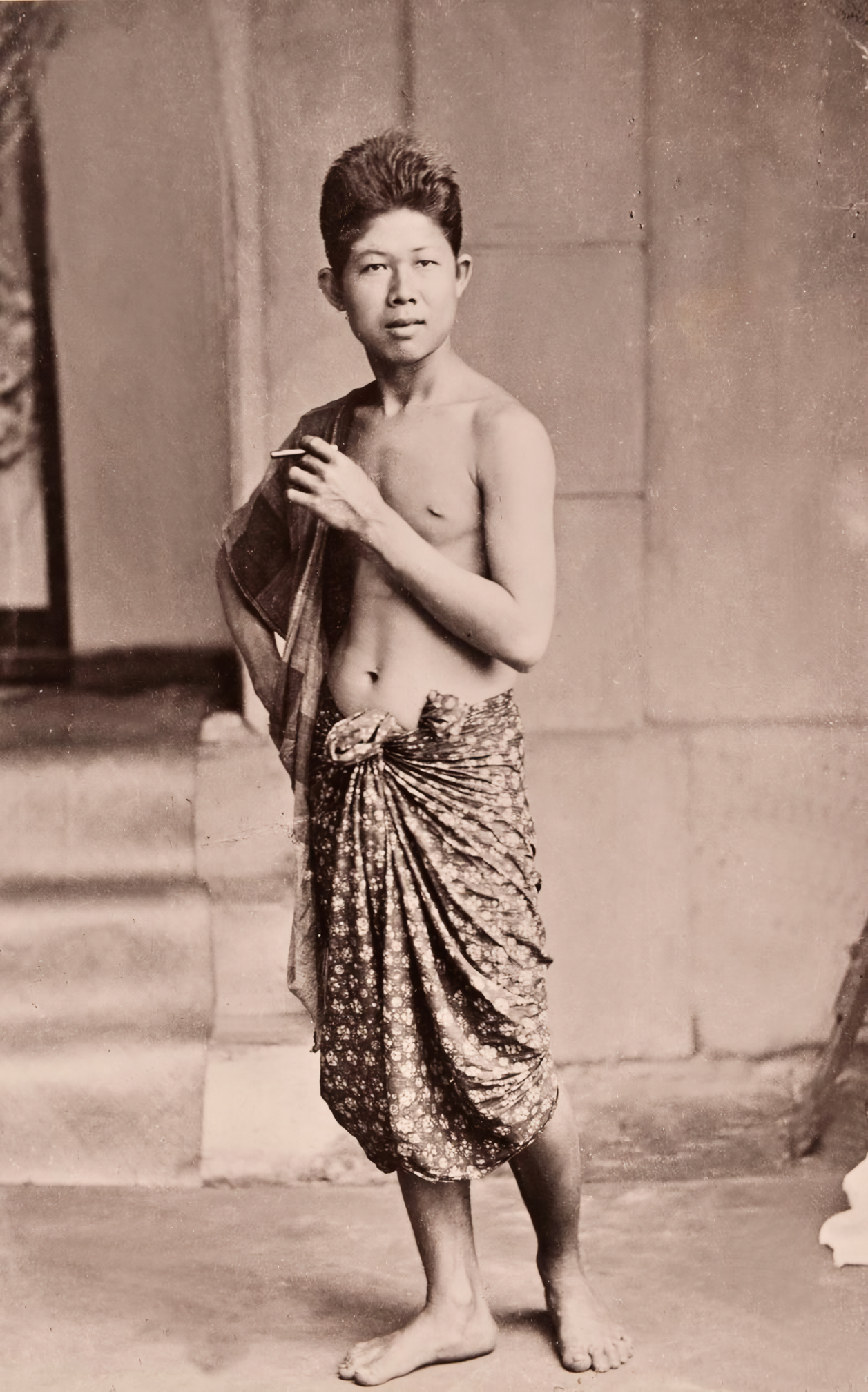
Siamese Man Photo c1890 by Robert Lenz

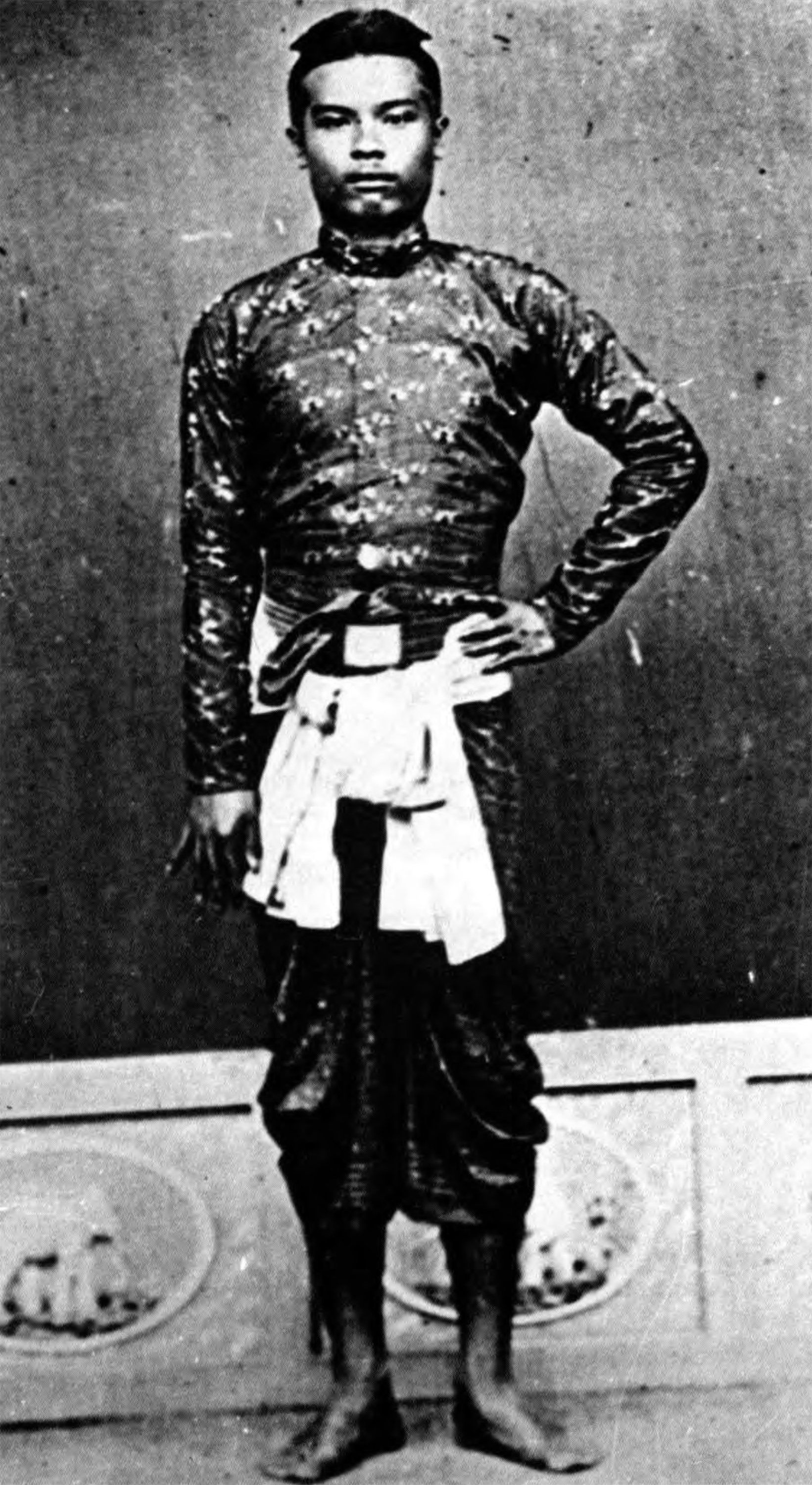
Thai noblemen, before 1950

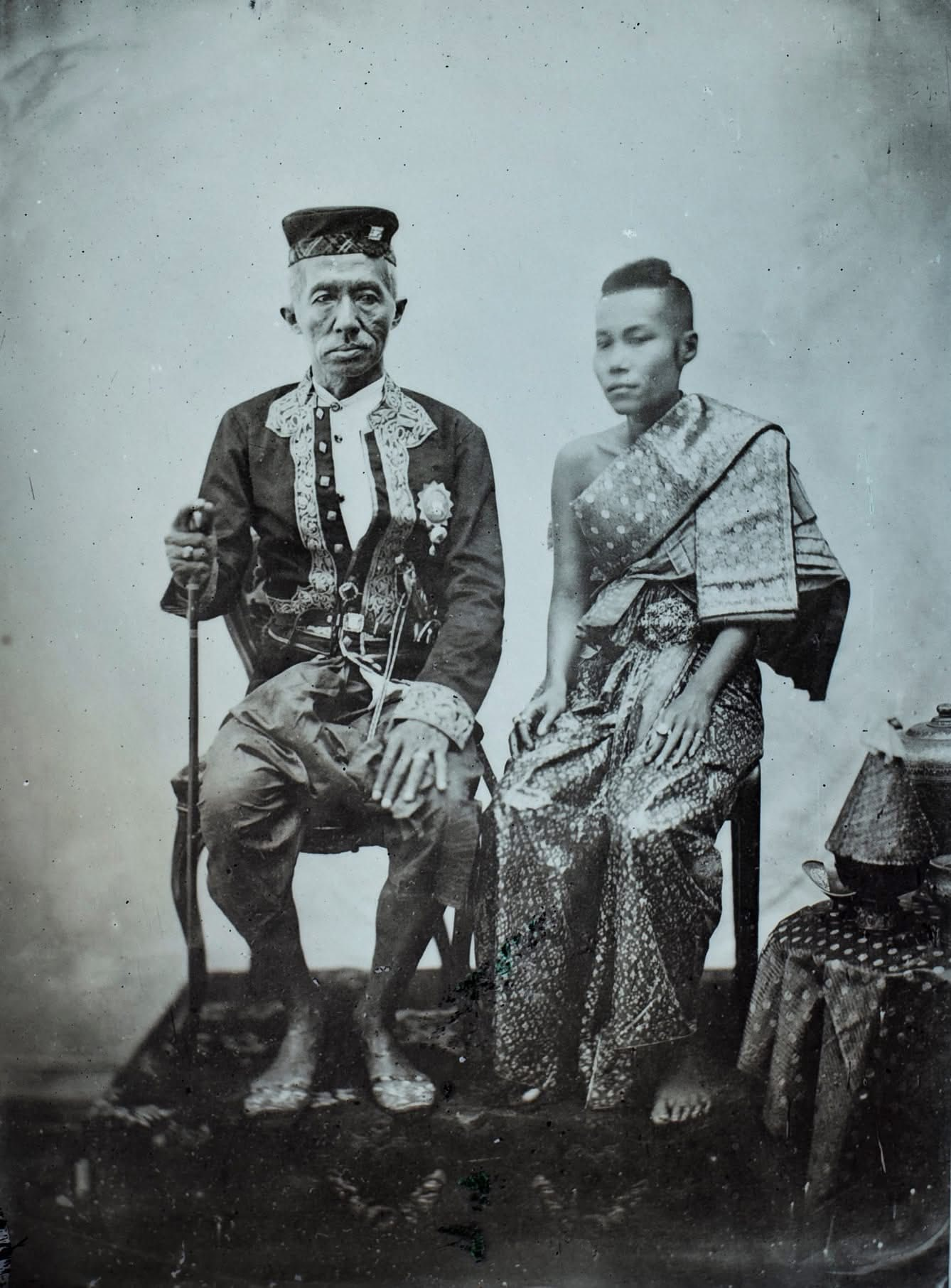
Portrait of King Mongkut (Rama IV) with his wife Queen Debsirindra of Thailand 1862-1867
Women's clothing

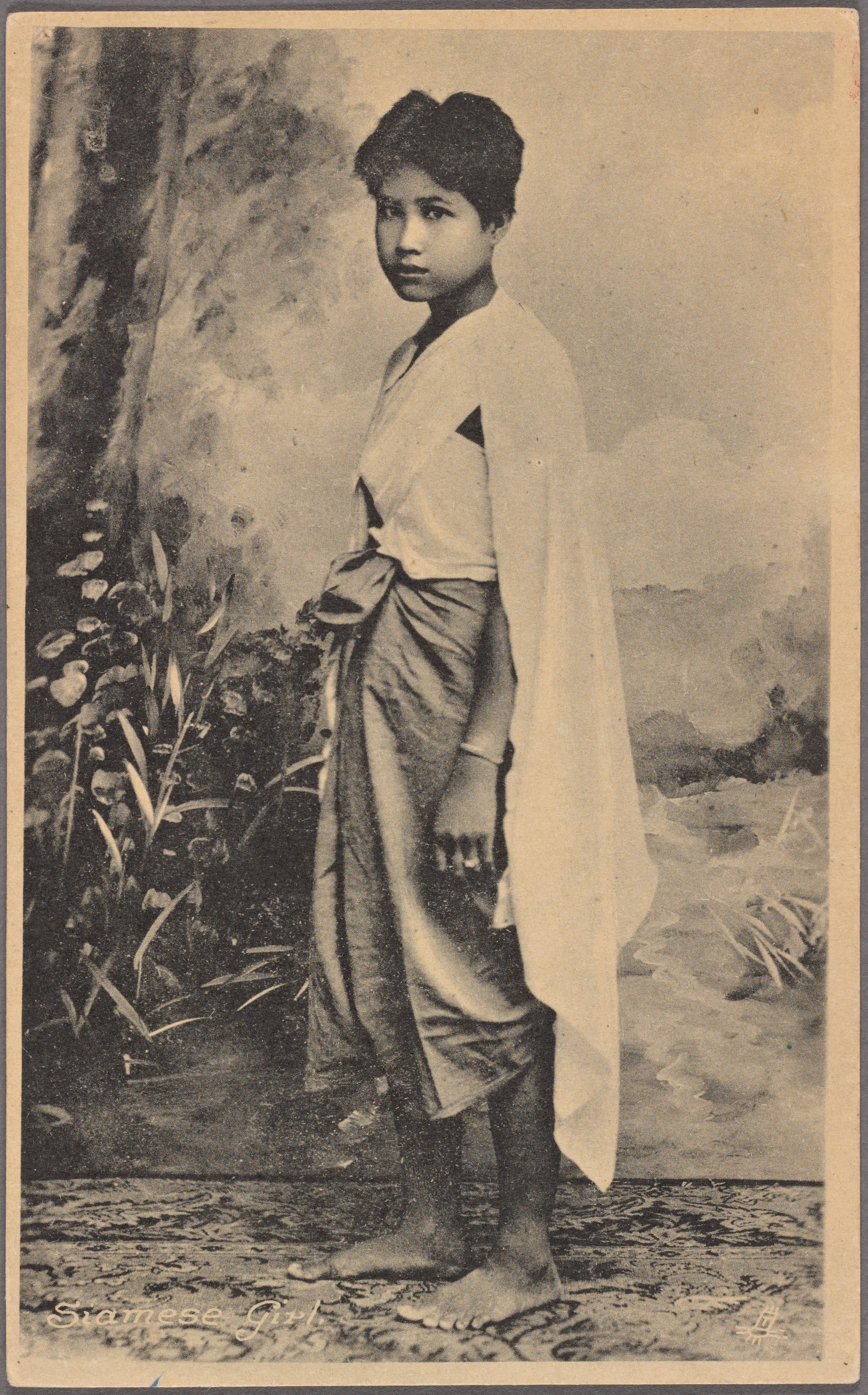
Siamese girl with the early Rattanakosin style clothing, 1921

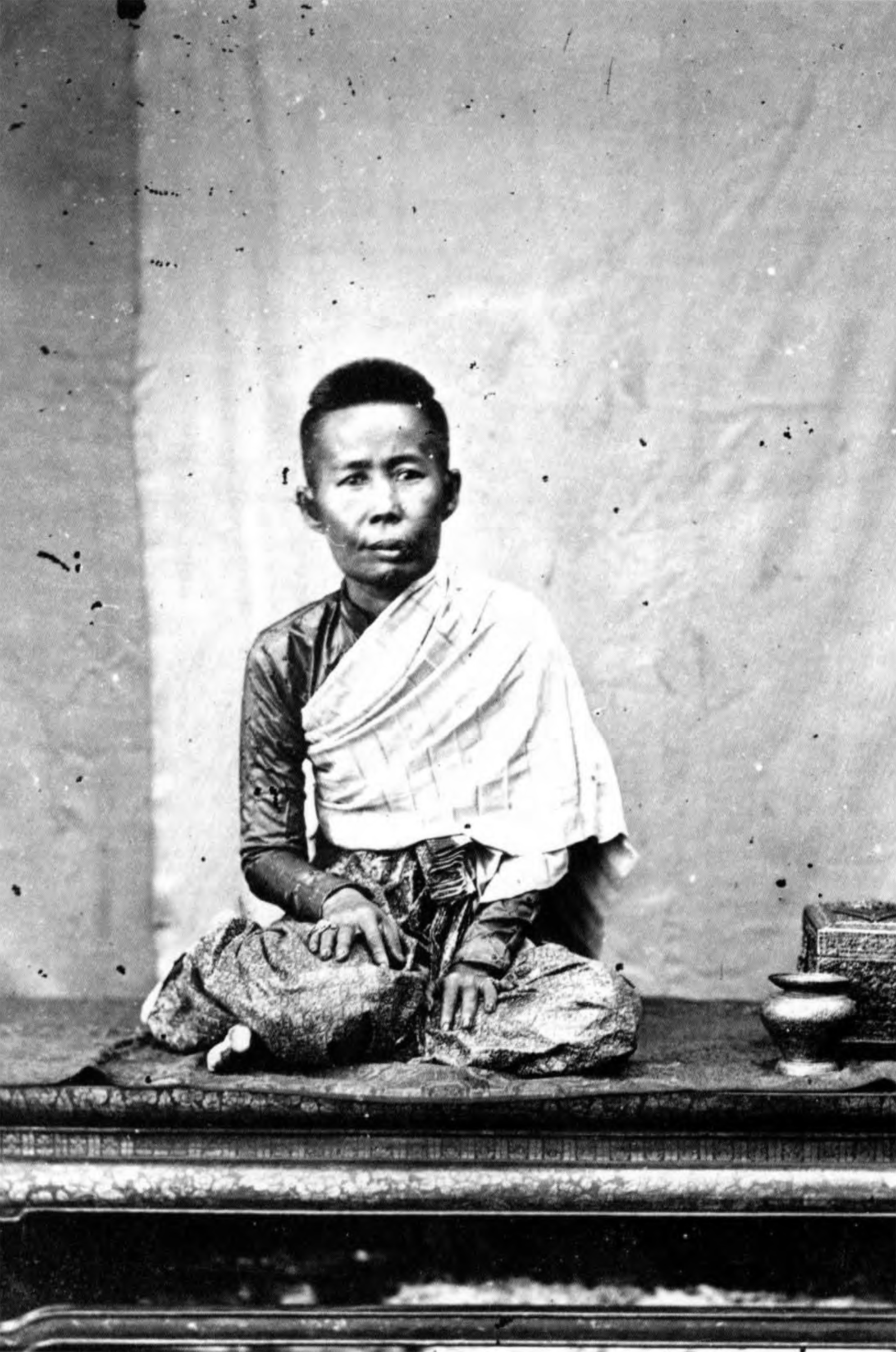
Princess Kinnari, the 30th daughter of King Rama III, 1819

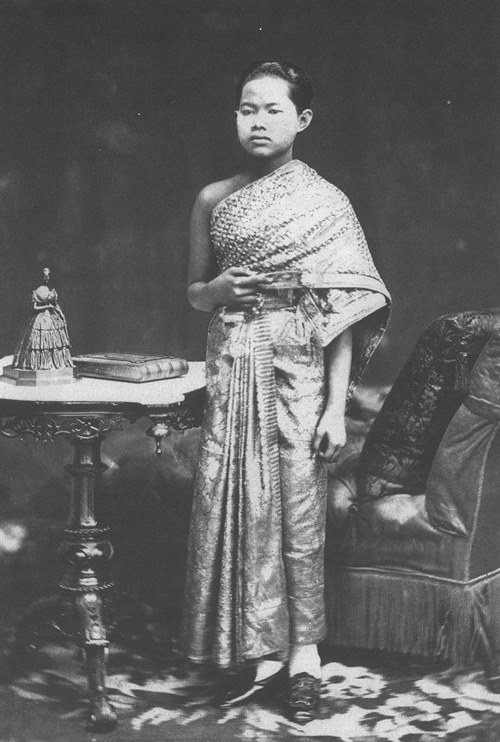
Queen Sunandha, one of the four consorts of King Chulalongkorn with the early Rattanakosin style clothing

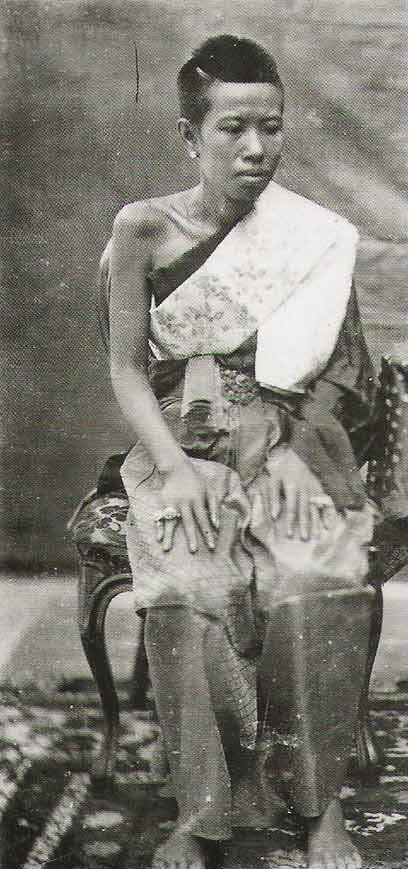
Tieng Rojanadis, was a consort of King Mongkut (Rama IV)

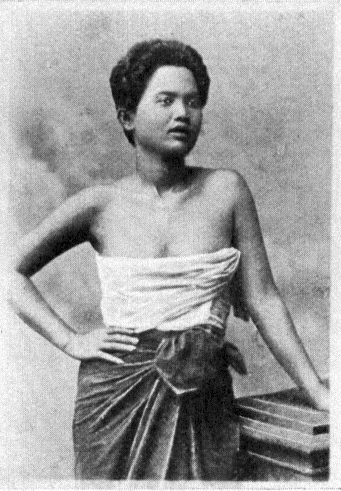
Siamese peasant, 1904

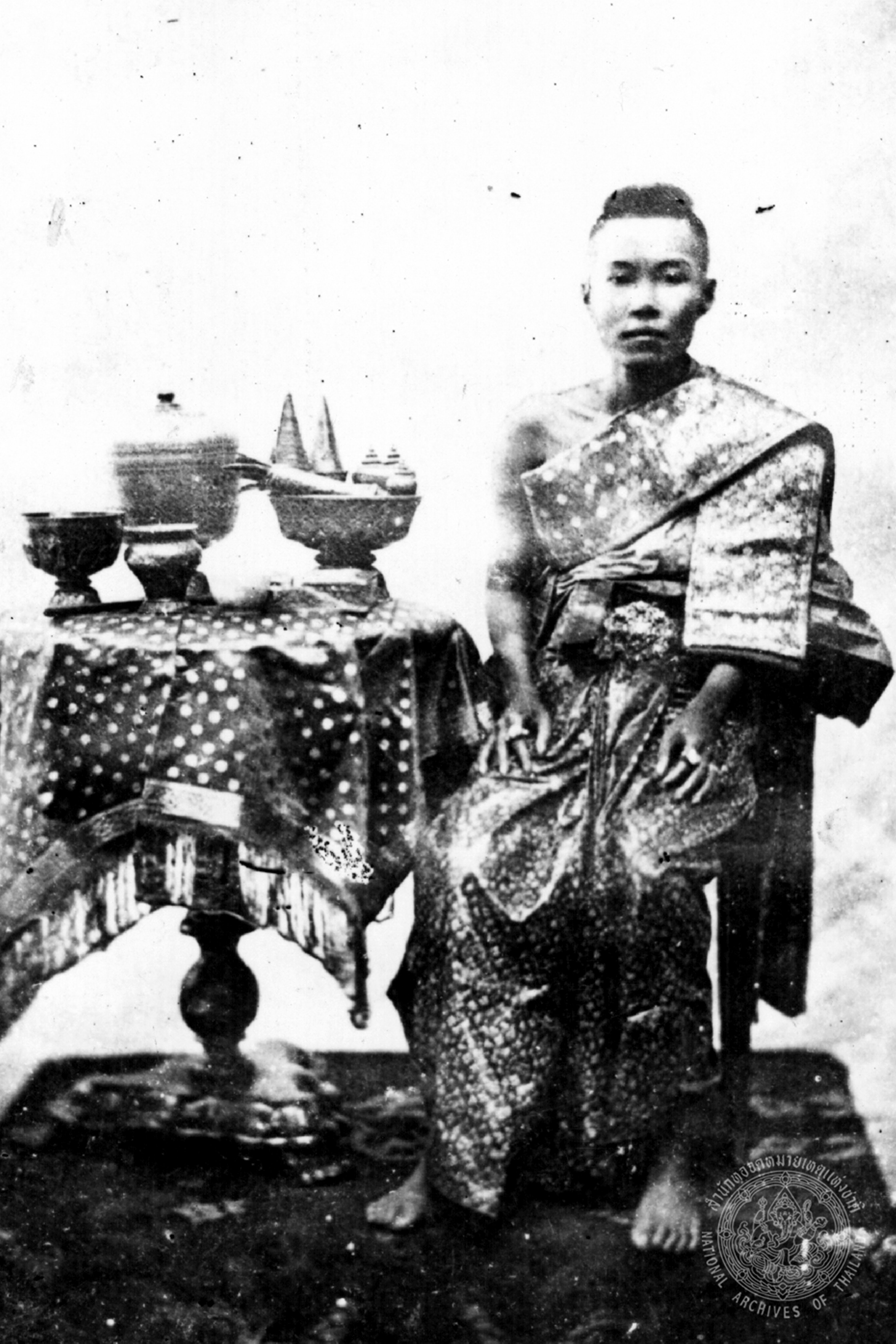
Queen Debsirindra, the second consort of King Mongkut with the early Rattanakosin style clothing, 1855

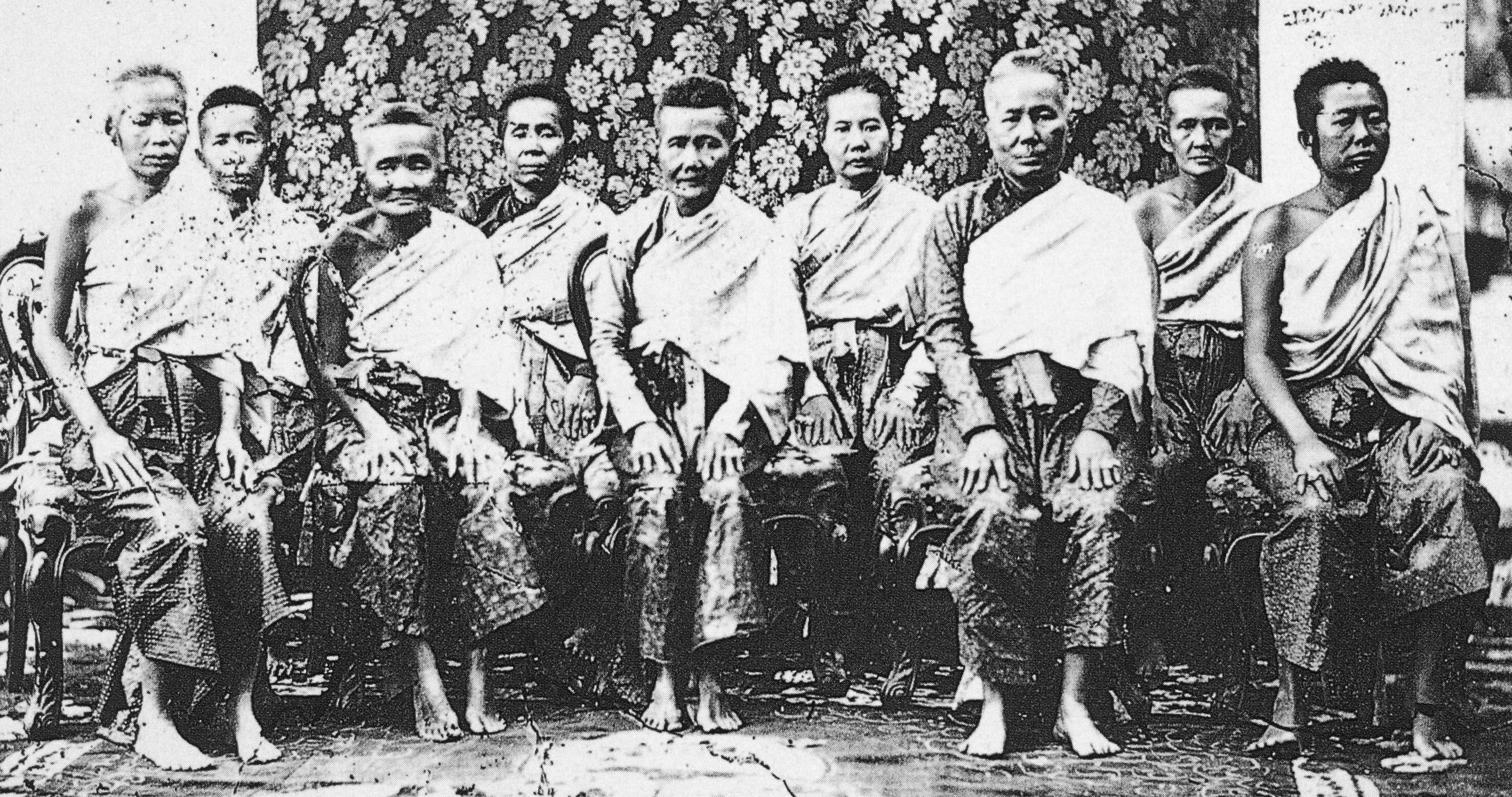
Daughters of King Rama II and King Rama III

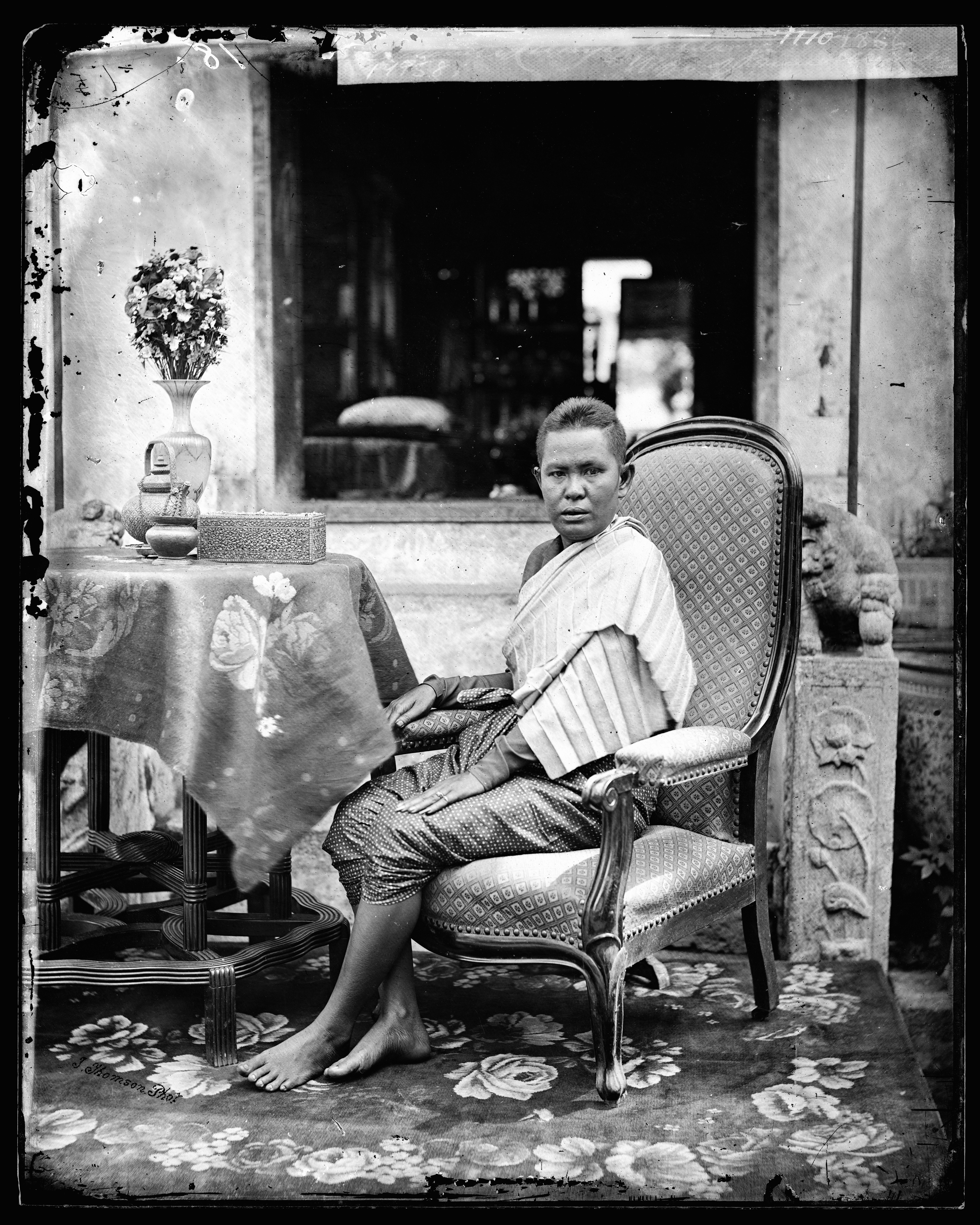
Lady Pun Bunnag, Somdet Chaophraya Borom Maha Sri Suriwongse's wife with the early Rattanakosin style clothing in 1866

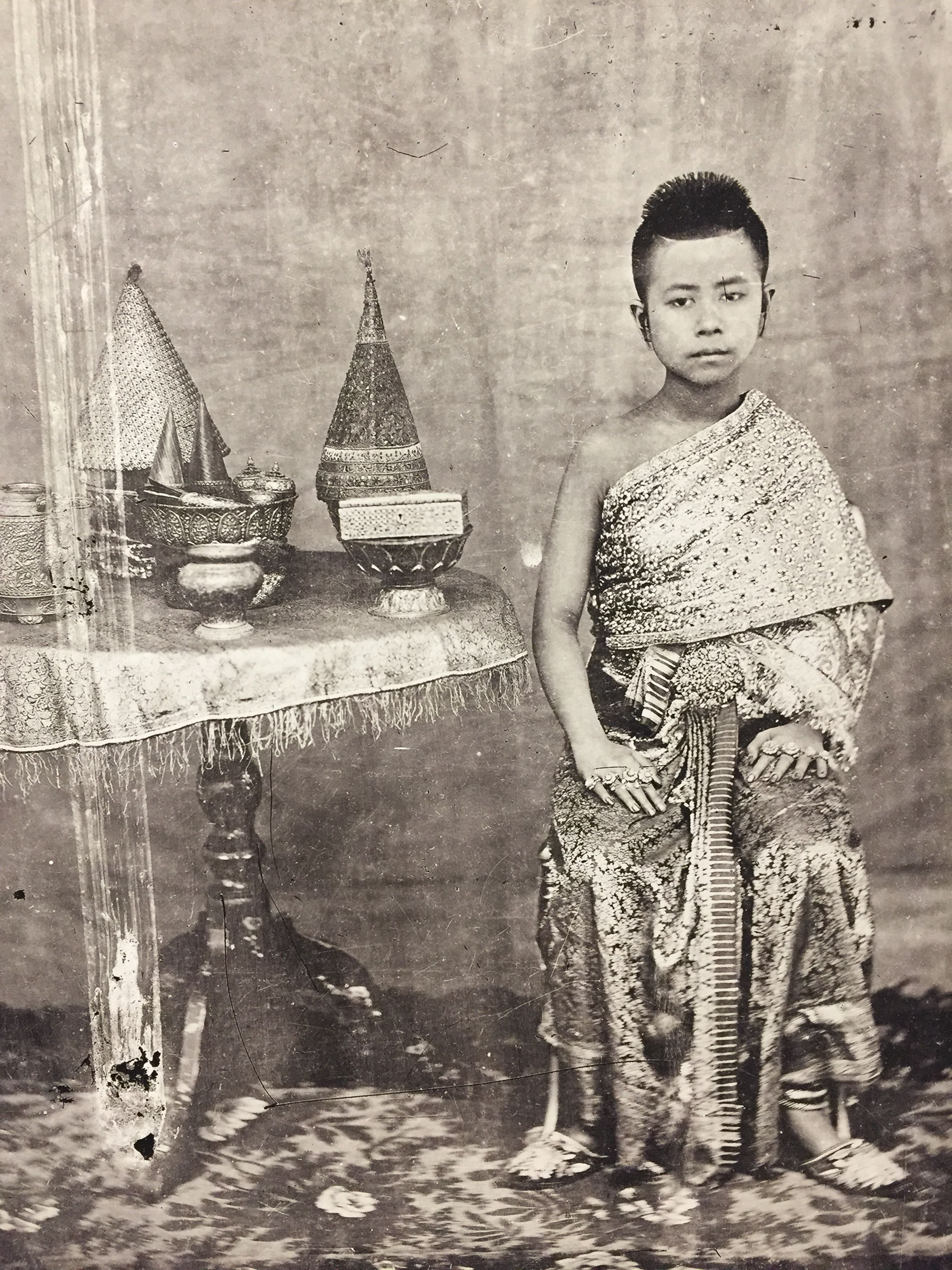
Princess Ying Yaowalak Akkharatchasuda (1851–1886), was the daughter of King Mongkut

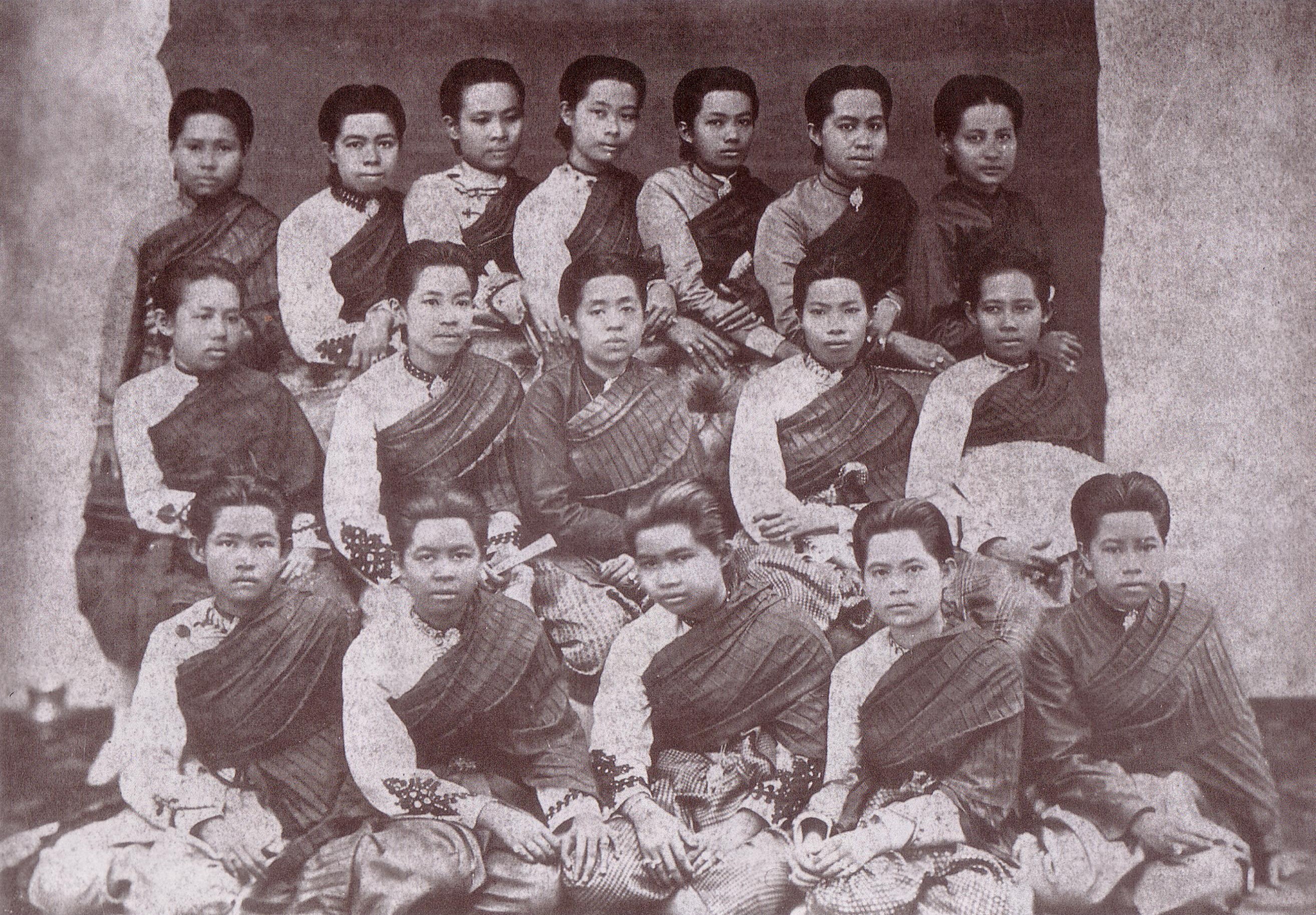
Daughters of King Mongkut (Rama IV) with the early Rattanakosin style clothing

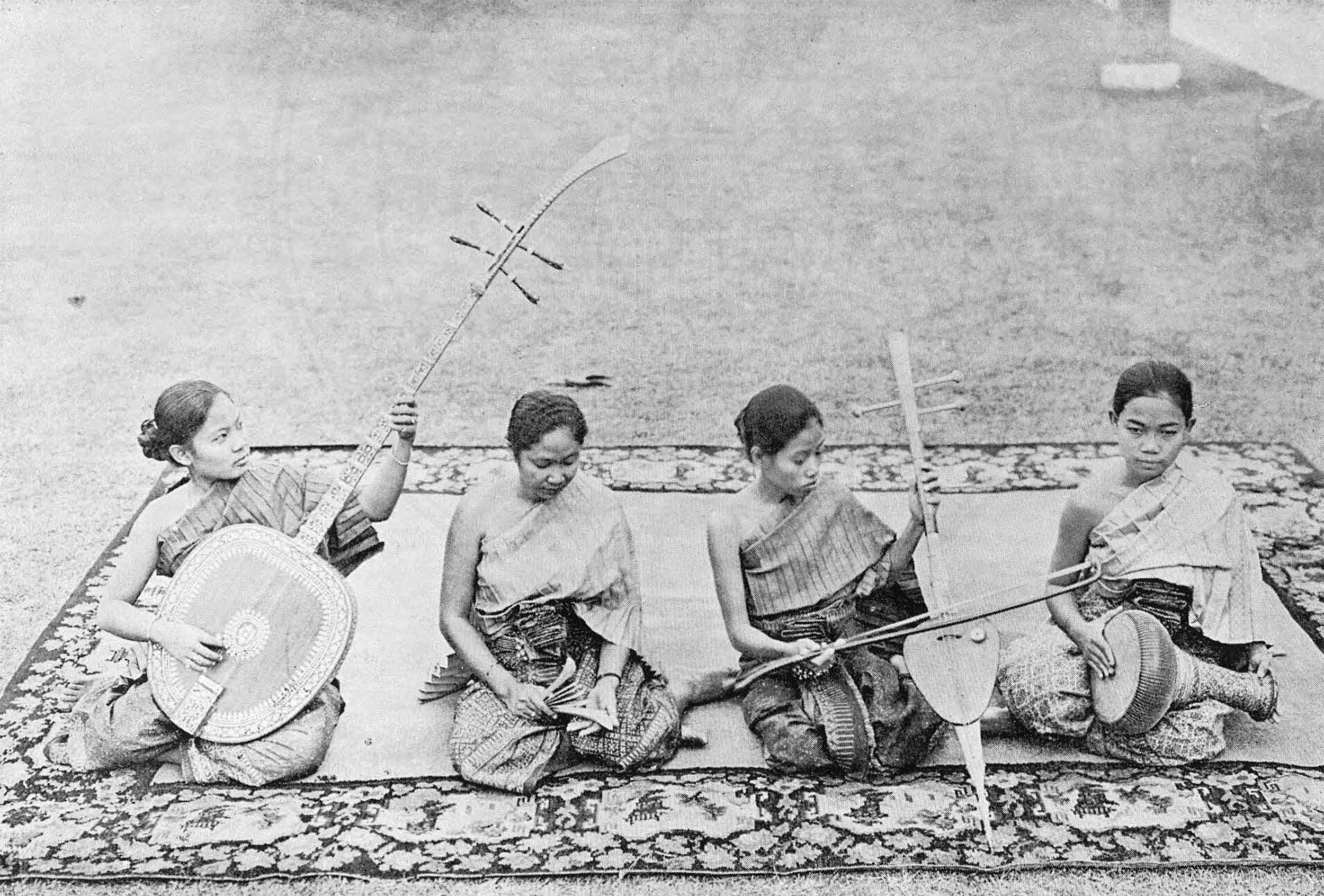
A traditional Siamese female quartet with the early Rattanakosin style clothing

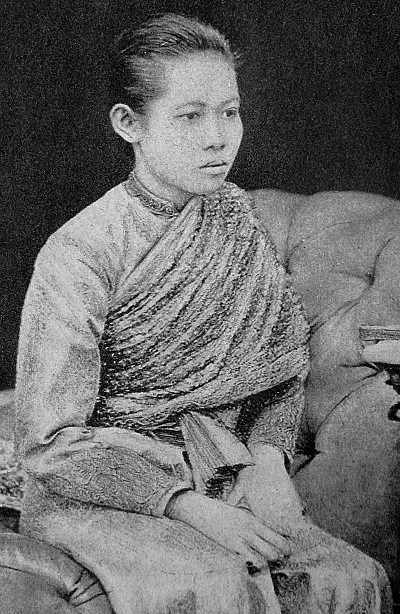
Queen Savang Vadhana, a consort of King Chulalongkorn (Rama V) in 1879

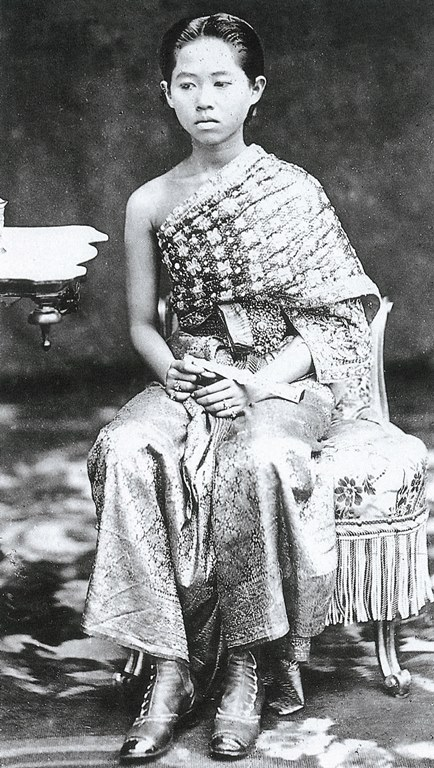
Princess Nariratana, was the daughter of King Mongkut (Rama IV)

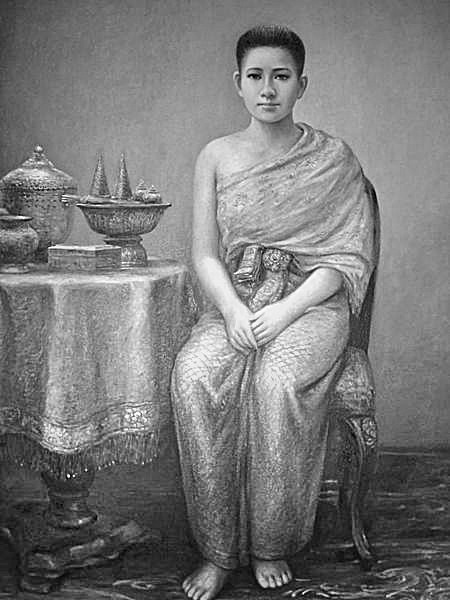
Queen Somanass Waddhanawathy, a first queen of King Mongkut (Rama IV)

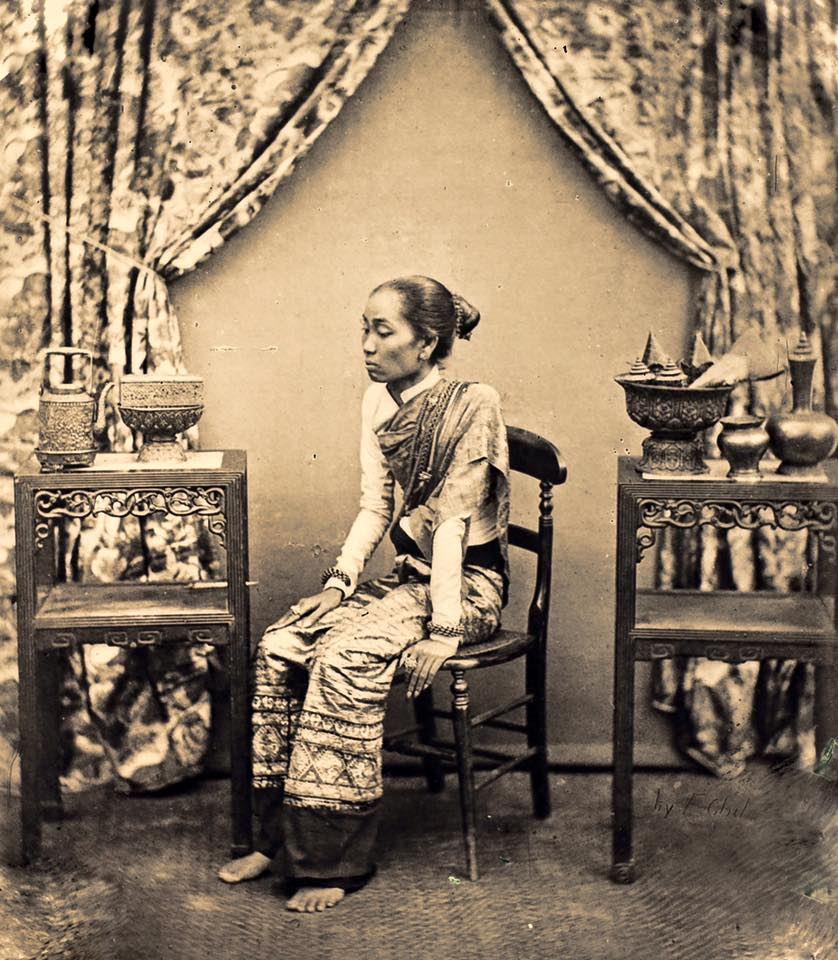
Princess Thip Keson (or Thep Kraison), Princess of Chiang Mai, consort of Inthawichayanon of Chiang Mai and mother of Dara Rasmi, before 1884

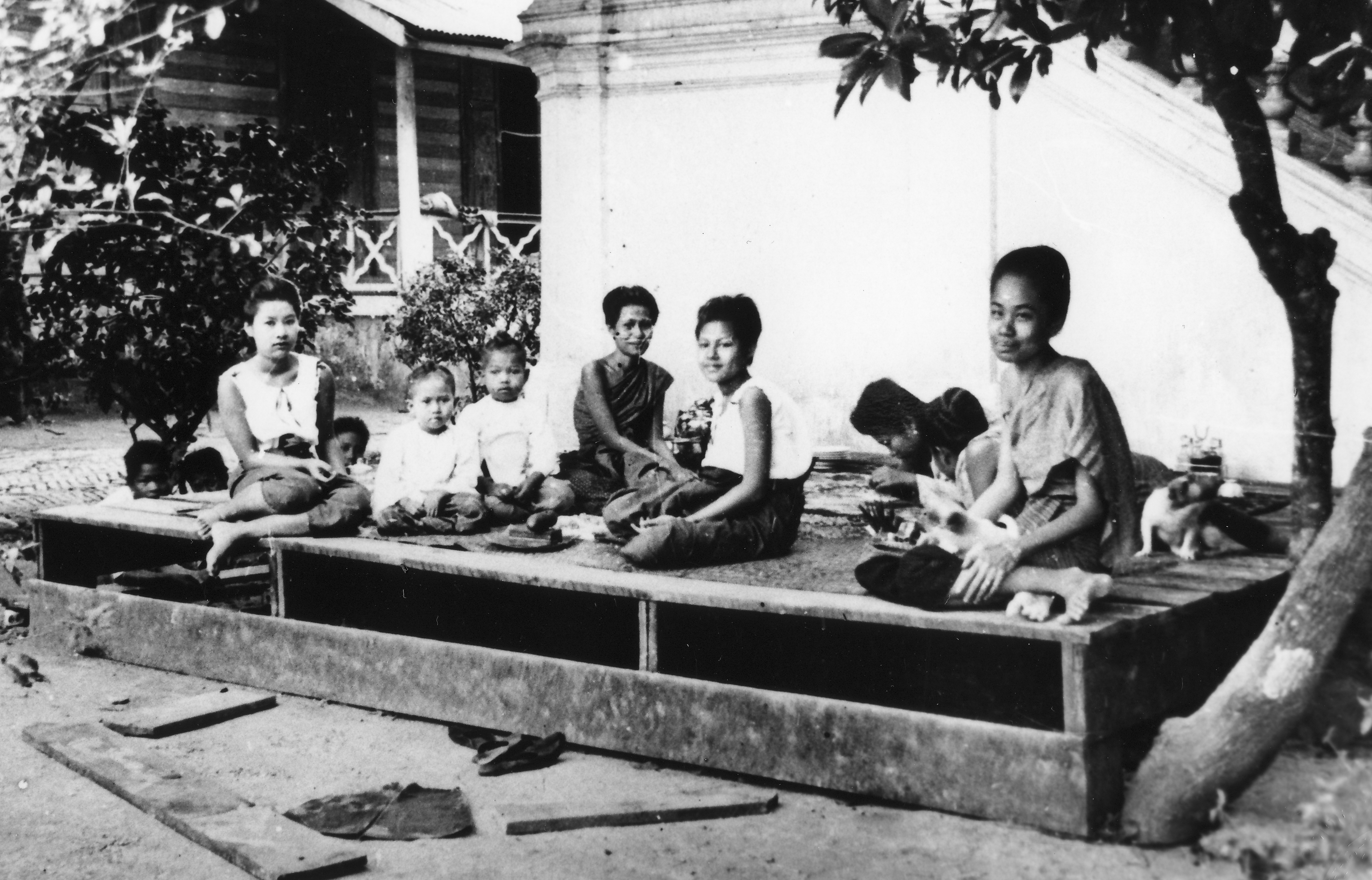
Princess Dara Rasmi, a princess of Chiang Mai wearing pha sin and pha biang at Dusit Palace, 1909

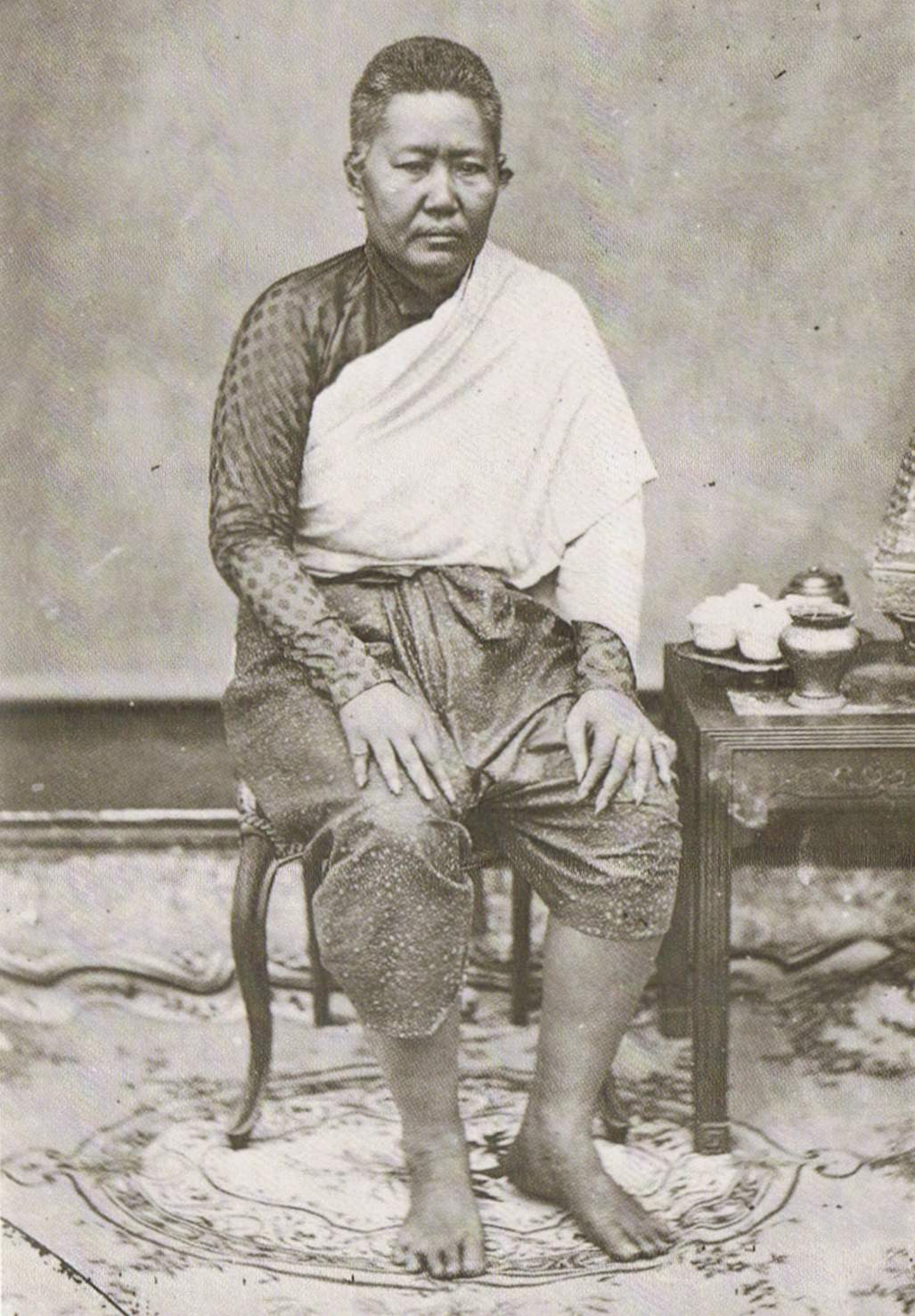
Princess Lamom, was the daughter of King Nangklao (Rama III), before 1896

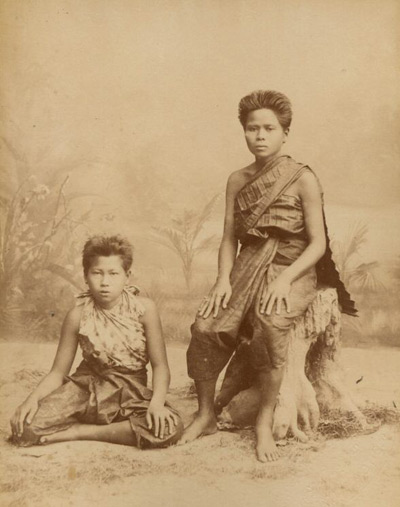
Siamese women's photo, 1890

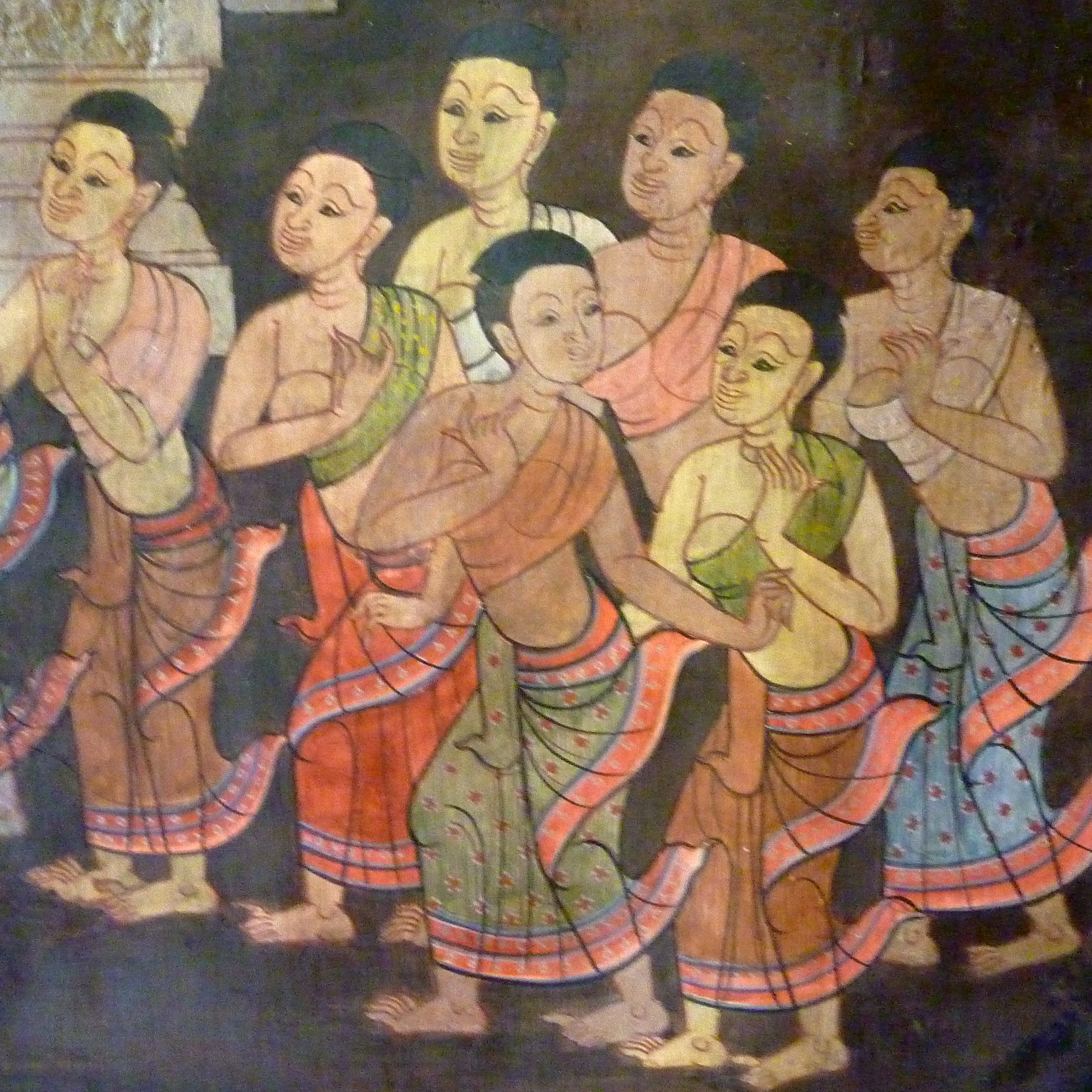
Painting of Siamese women wearing pha nung and Sabai or pha biang in Wat Pho, Bangkok

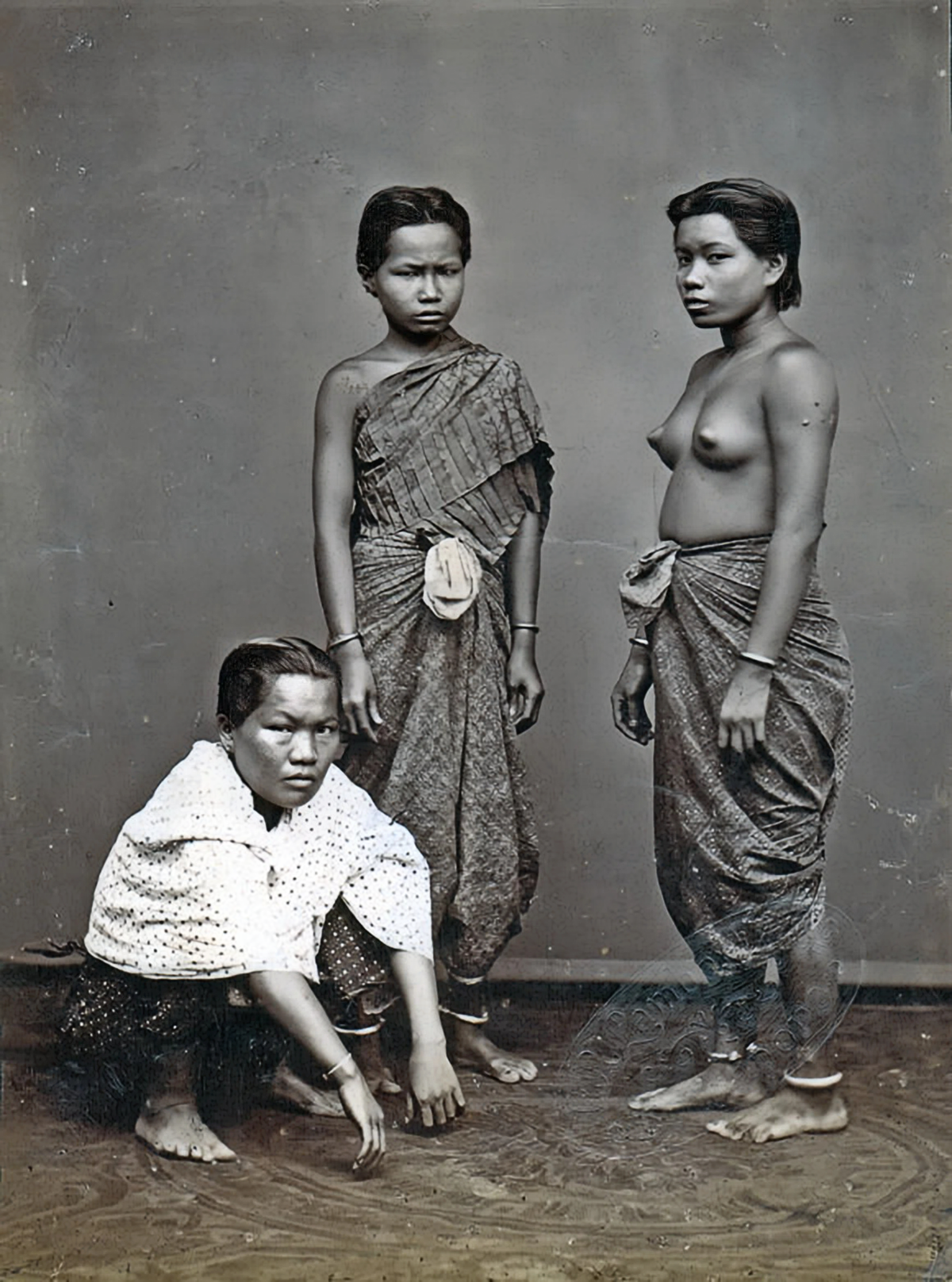
Siamese Country Women Photo Gustav Lambert c1895

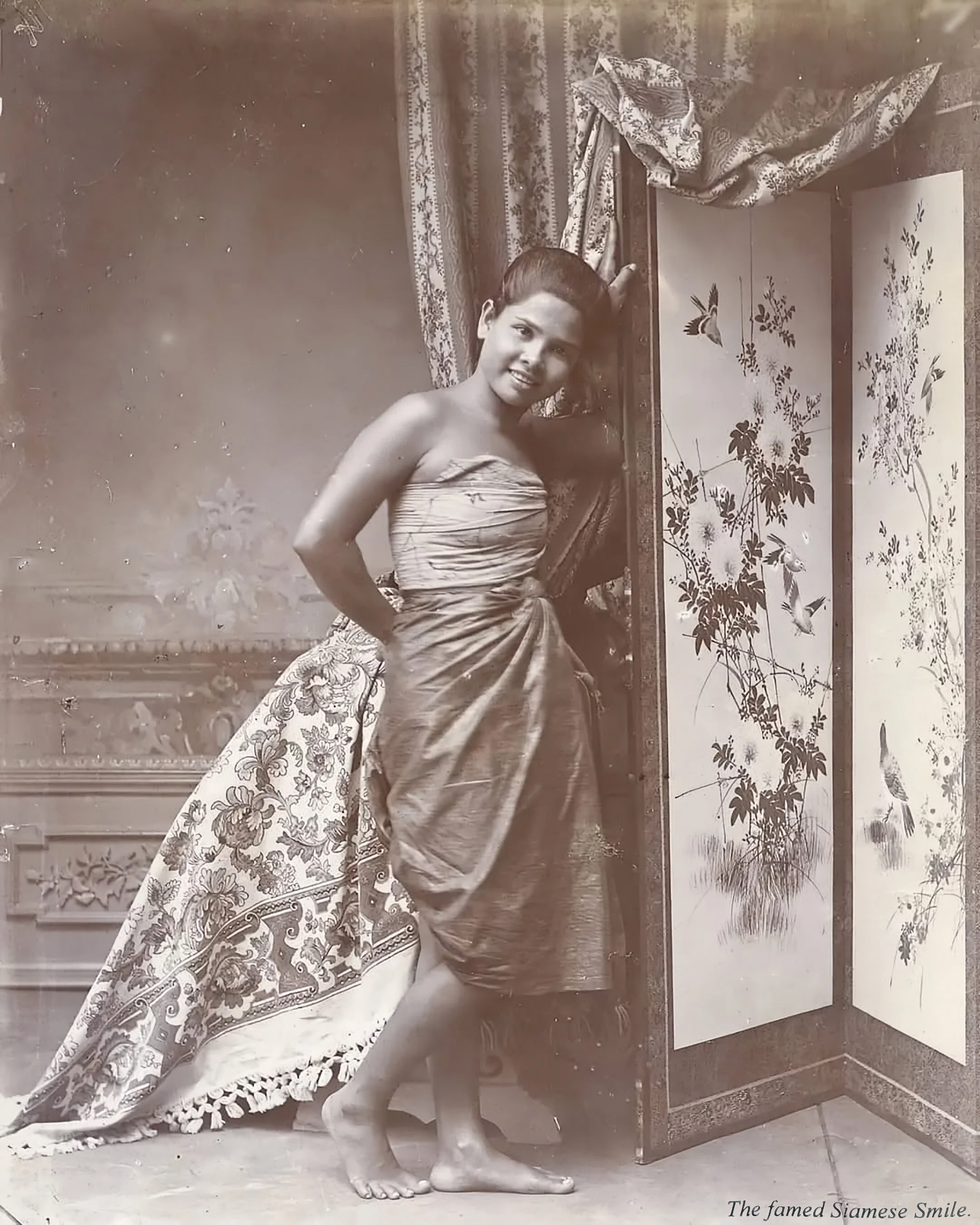
Famed Siamese Smile Girl 1900 by Roberts Lenz

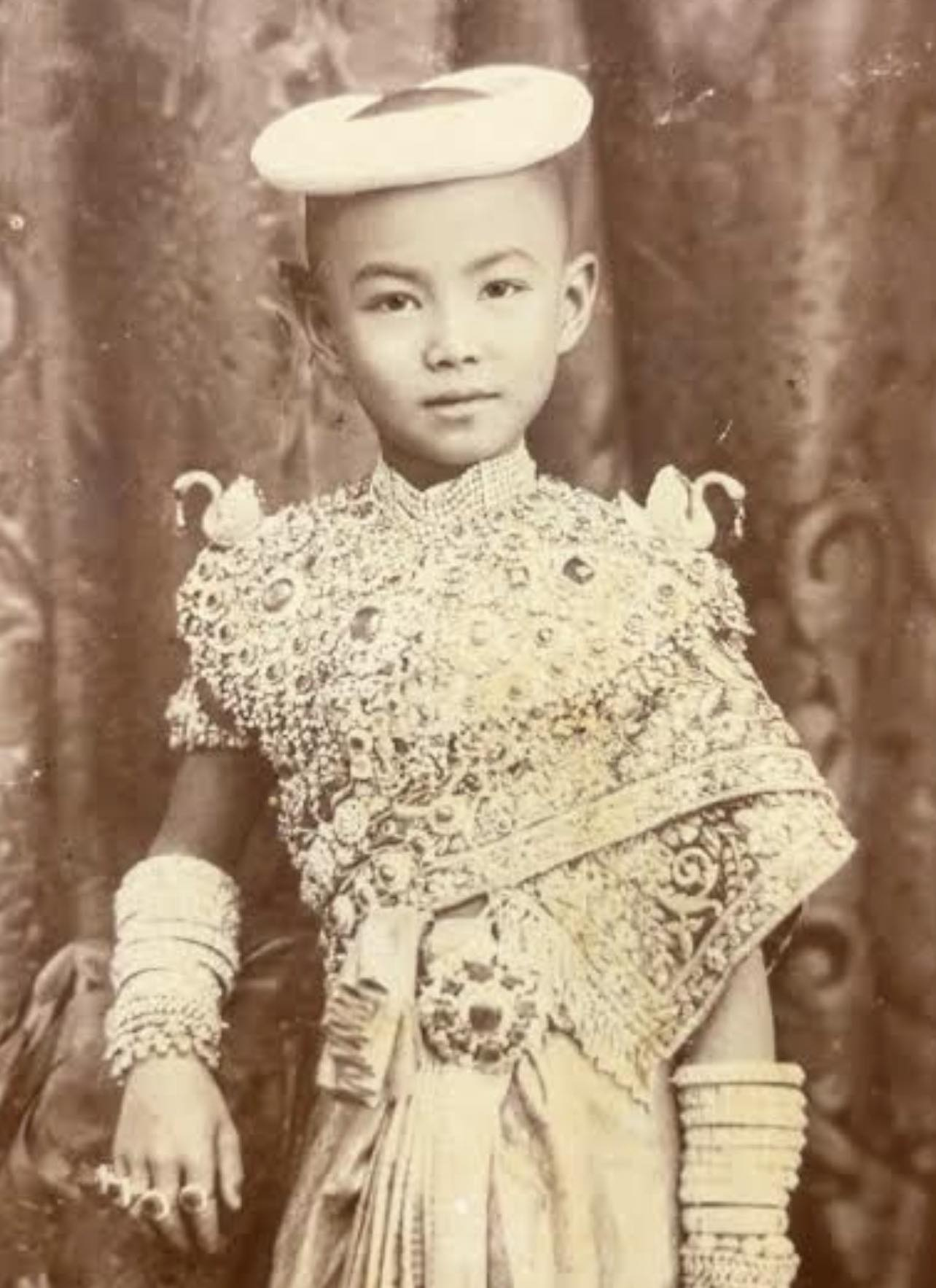
Princess Hemwadee, daughter of King Chulalongkorn

=== Modern Rattanakosin ===
From the 1860s onward, Thai royals "selectively adopted Victorian corporeal and sartorial etiquette to fashion modern personas that were publicized domestically and internationally by means of mechanically reproduced images." Stitched clothing, including court attire and ceremonial uniforms, were invented during the reign of King Chulalongkorn. Western forms of dress became popular among urbanites in Bangkok during this time period.

During the early 1900s, King Vajiravudh launched a campaign to encourage Thai women to wear long hair instead of traditional short hair, and to wear pha sinh (ผ้าซิ่น), a tubular skirt, instead of the chong kraben (โจงกระเบน), a cloth wrap.

Noblemen's clothing

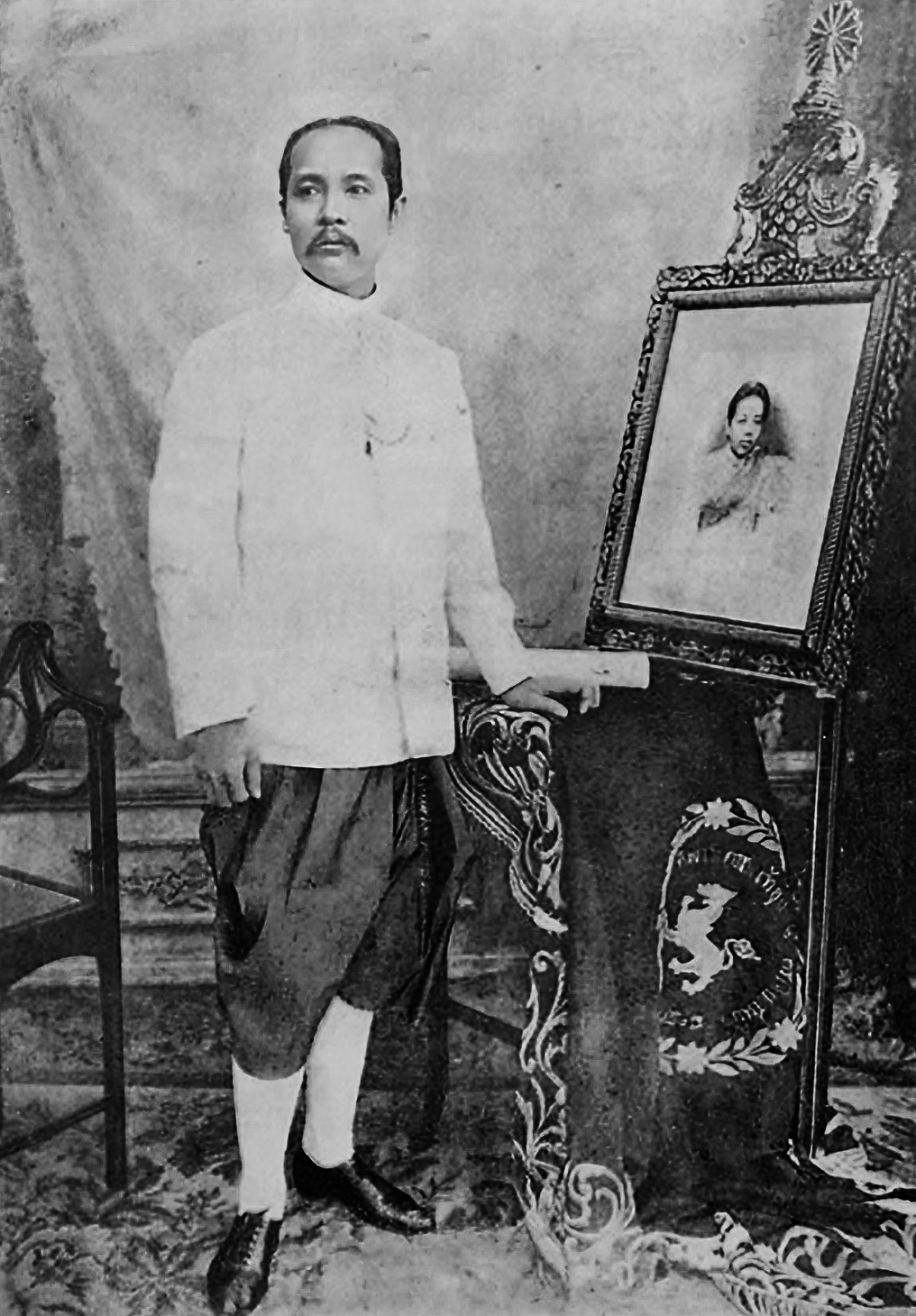
King Chulalongkorn wearing the raj pattern costume, consisting of a white Nehru-style jacket with five buttons and a chong kraben

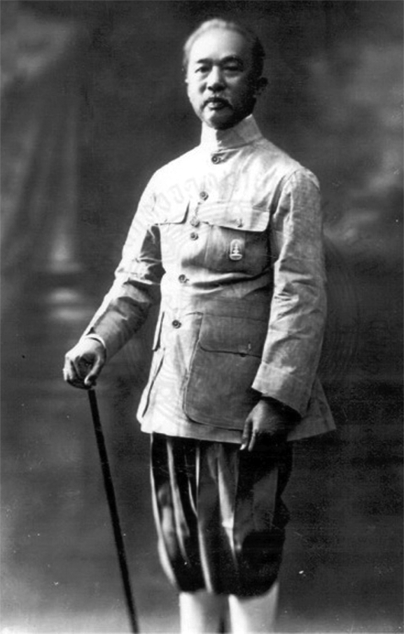
Prince Damrong Rajanubhab wearing the raj pattern costume, 1900

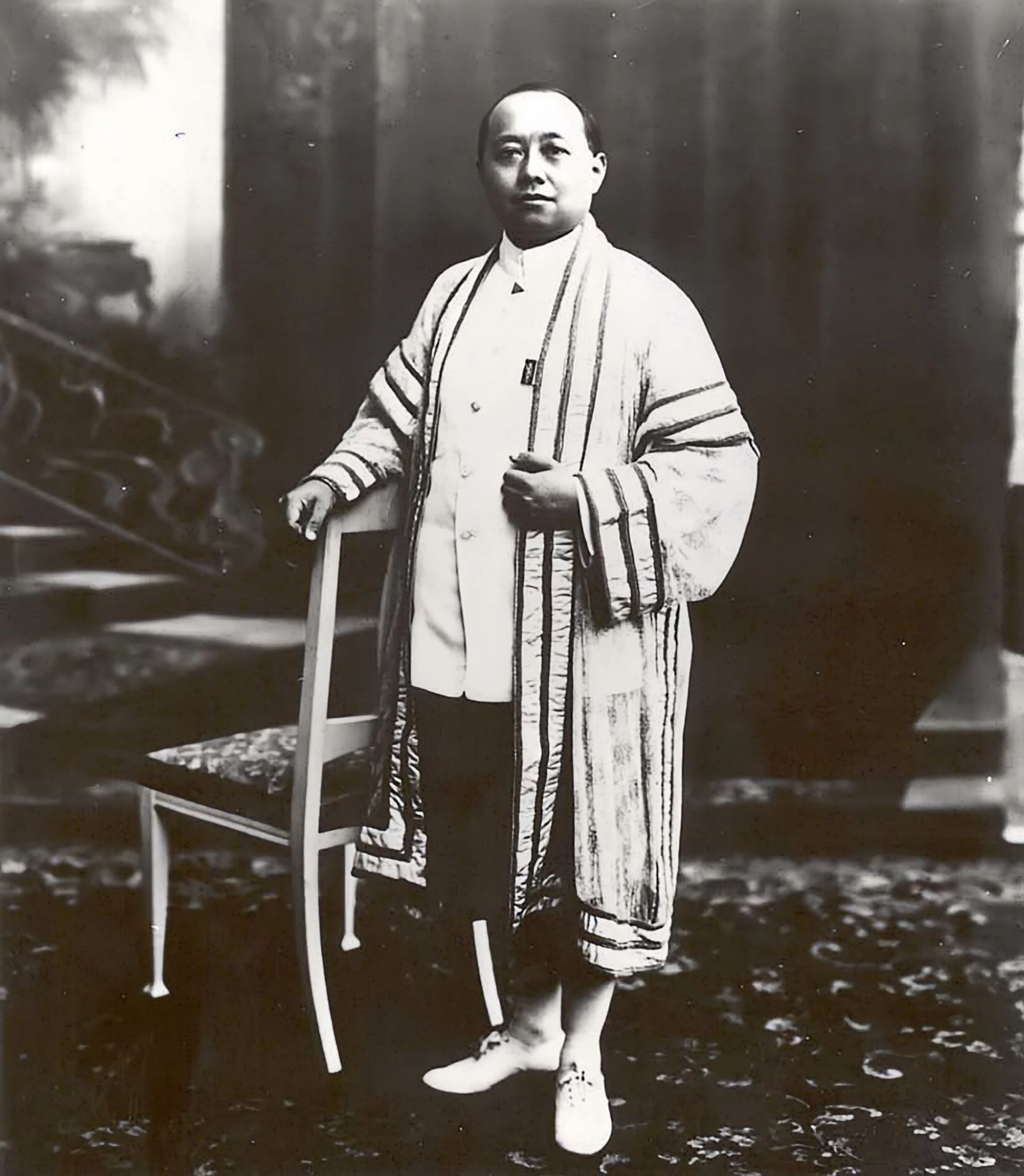
King Vajiravudh wearing the raj pattern covered with the khrui

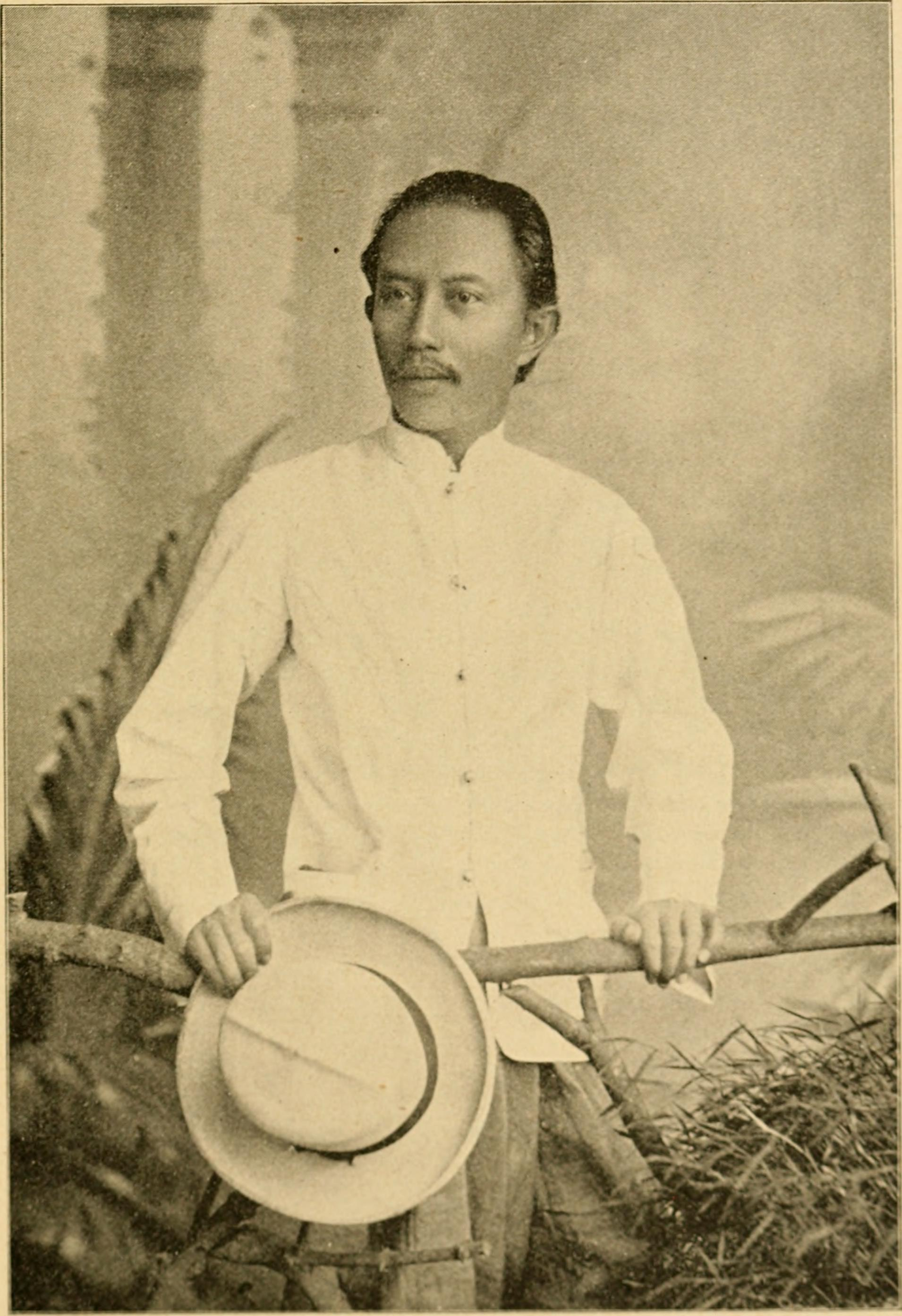
Prince Vividhavannapreecha, the 51st son of King Chulalongkorn in 1893

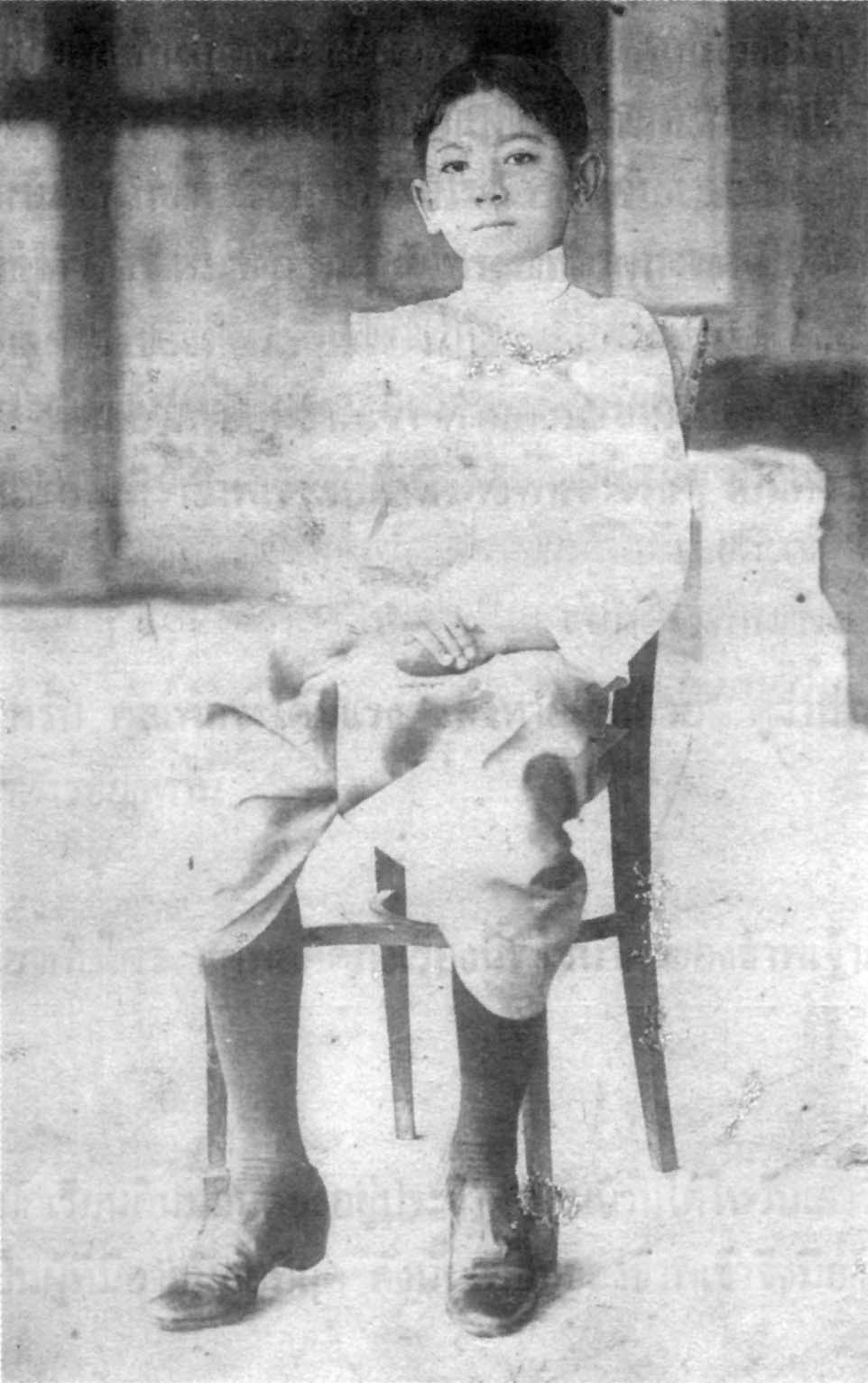
Portrait of Mom Luang Pin Malakul as a student at Suankularb Wittayalai School, 1910s

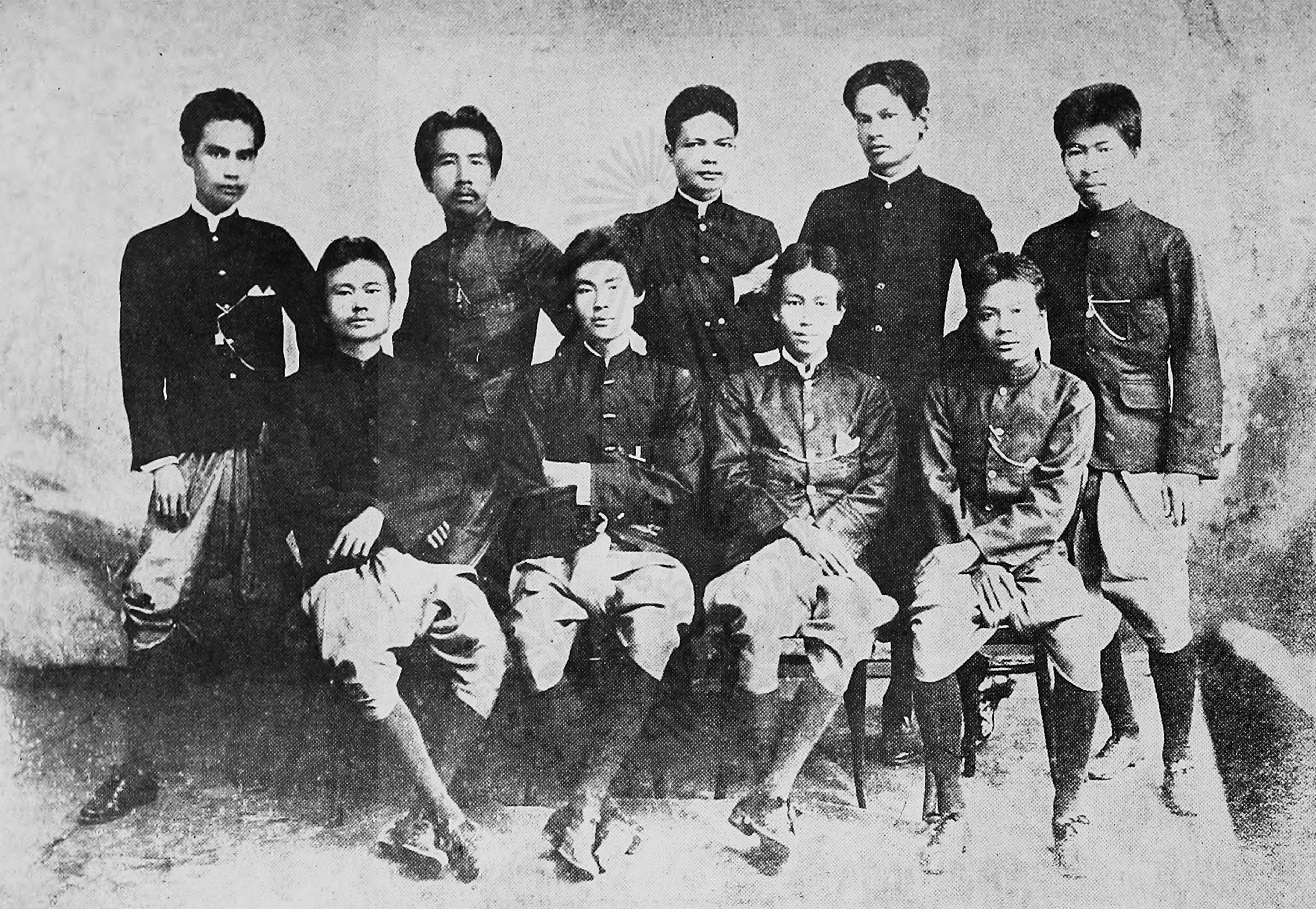
Thai barristers, 1897
Noblewomen's clothing

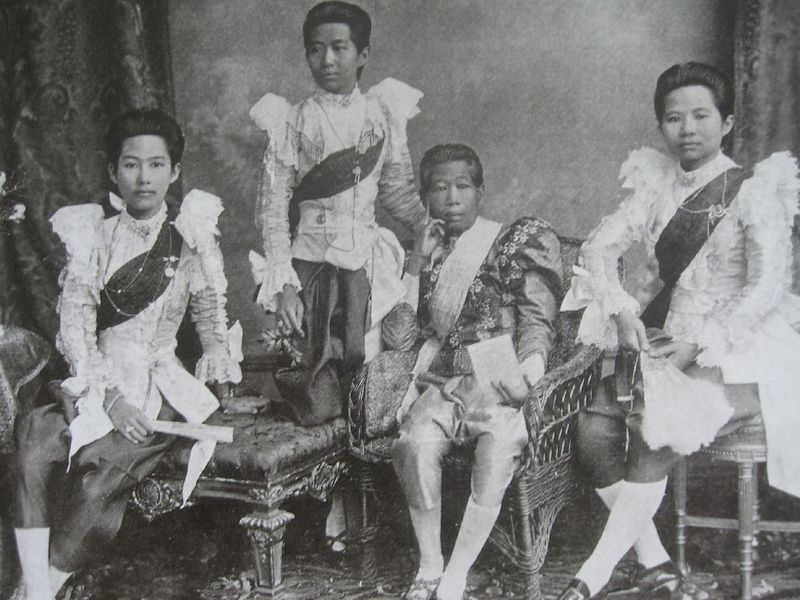
Queen consort Sukhumala Marasri of King Chulalongkorn (Rama V). with her mother and daughters in 1880

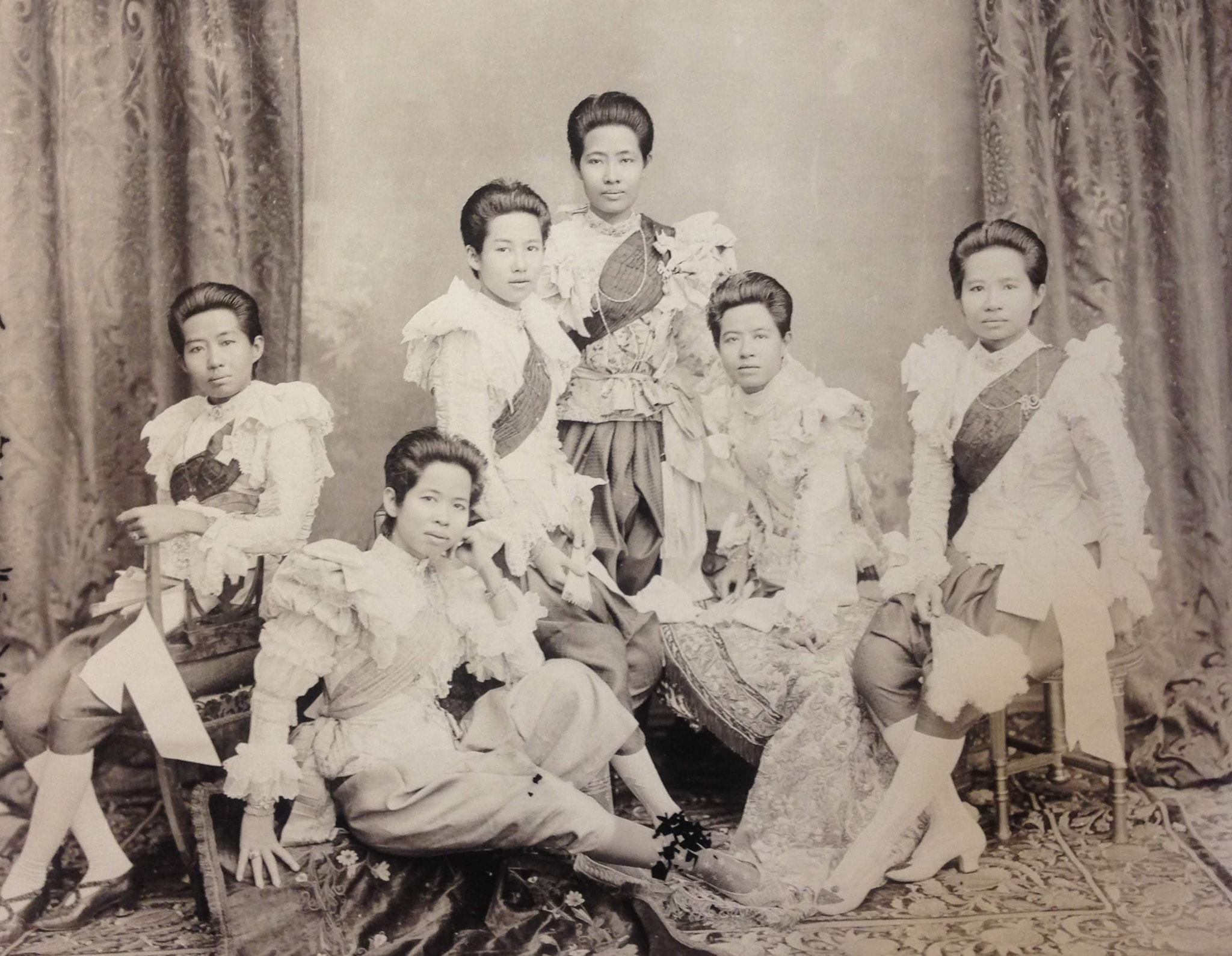
Queen consort Sukhumala Marasri and the princesses of King Chulalongkorn (Rama V), 1887

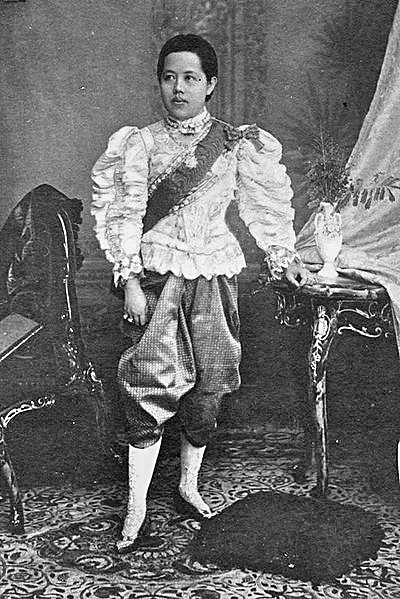
Queen Saovabha Phongsri, an agnatic half-sister and queen of King Chulalongkorn (Rama V), 1897

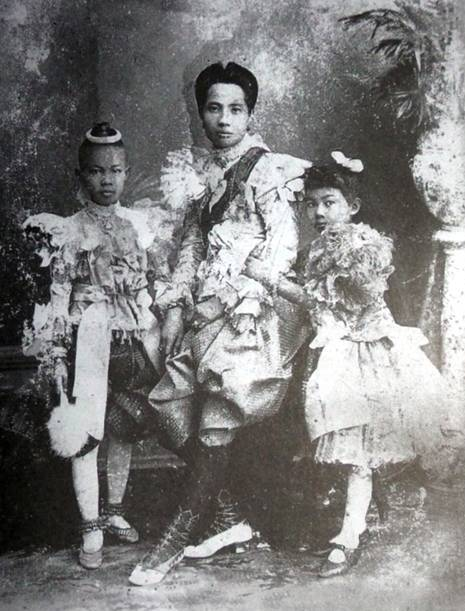
Chum Krairoek Royal Highness Consort of King Chulalongkorn (Rama V) and her daughters in 1900s

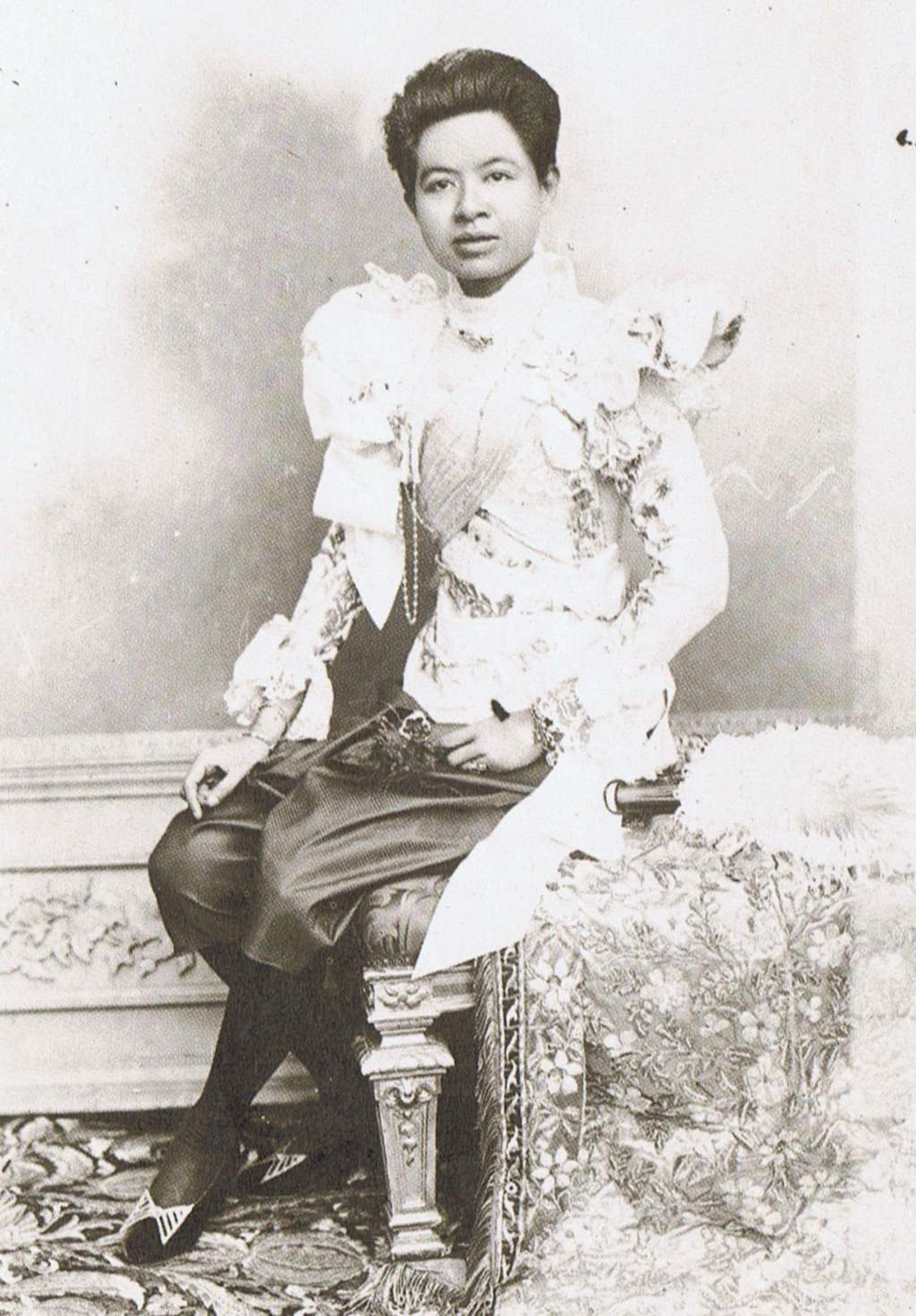
Princess Puangsoi Sa-ang, was the daughter of King Mongkut (Rama IV), 1880

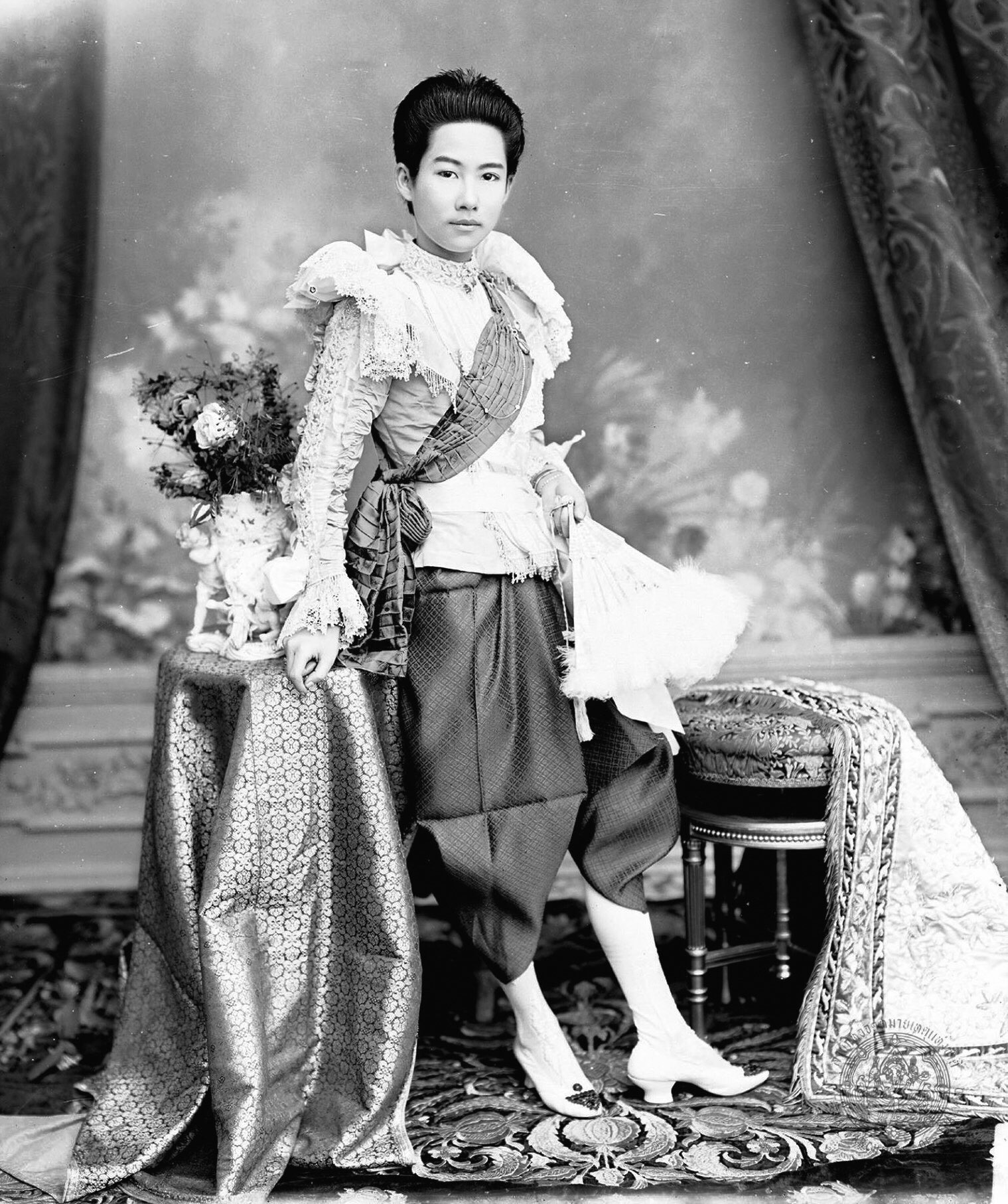
Princess Suddha Dibyaratana or the Princess of Rattanakosin, was the daughter of King Chulalongkorn (Rama V), before 1910

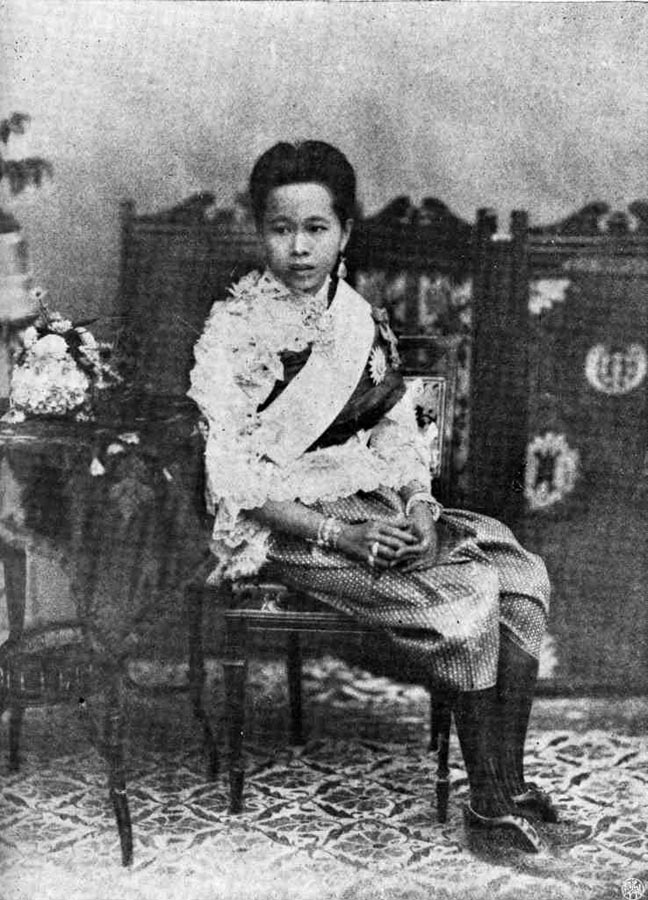
Princess Saisavali Bhiromya, was a princess consort of King Chulalongkorn (Rama V), 1887

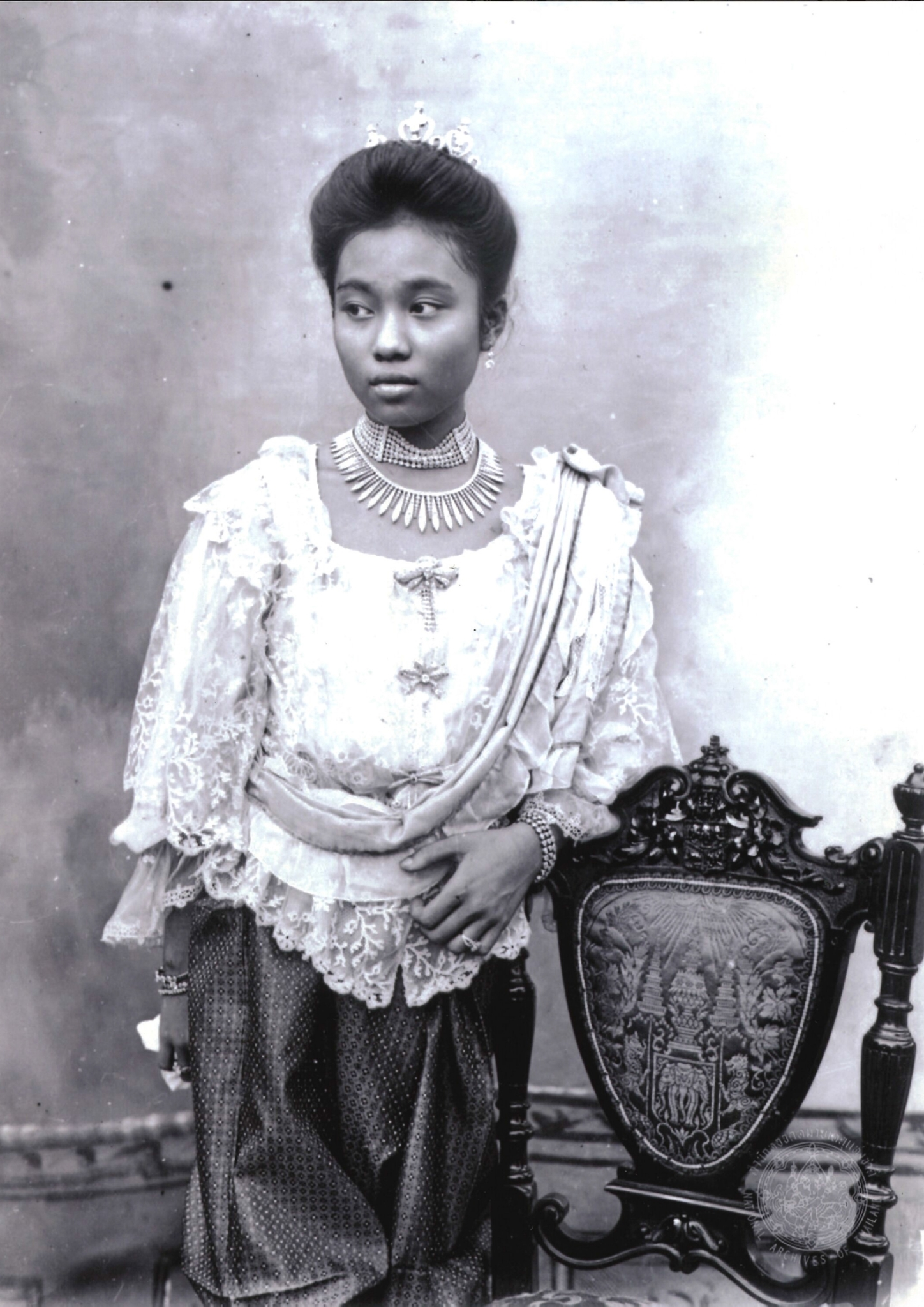
Chao Chom Mom Rajawongse Sadap (1890–1983), was the noble consort of King Chulalongkorn (Rama V)

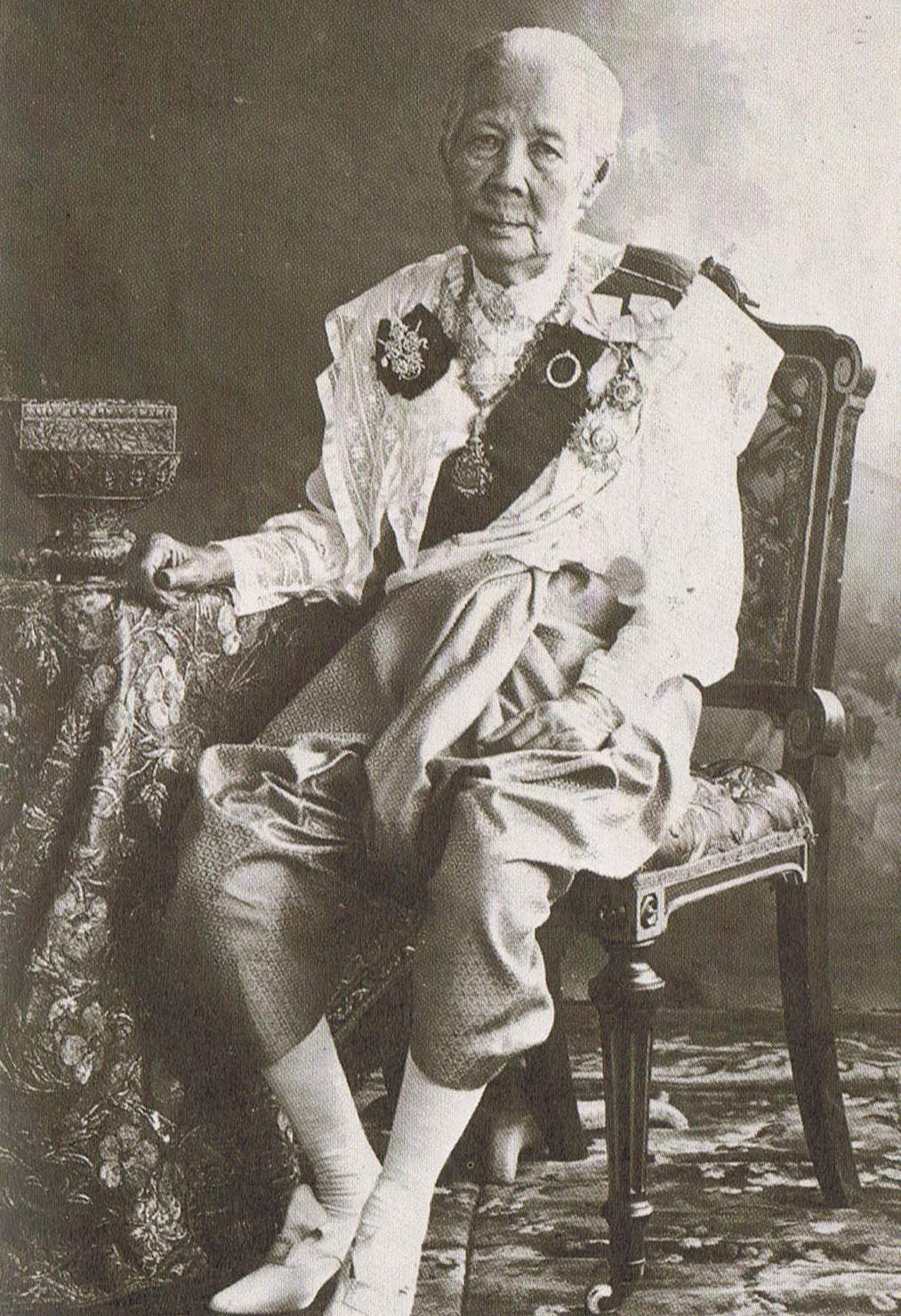
Princes Mankhian, was the daughter of King Rama II

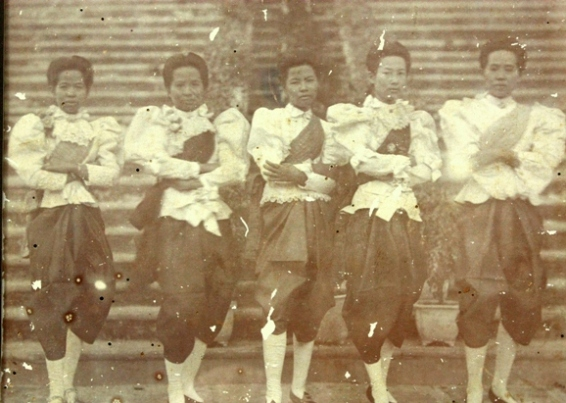
Thai princess of the Inner Court of the Grand Palace, Bangkok in 1890

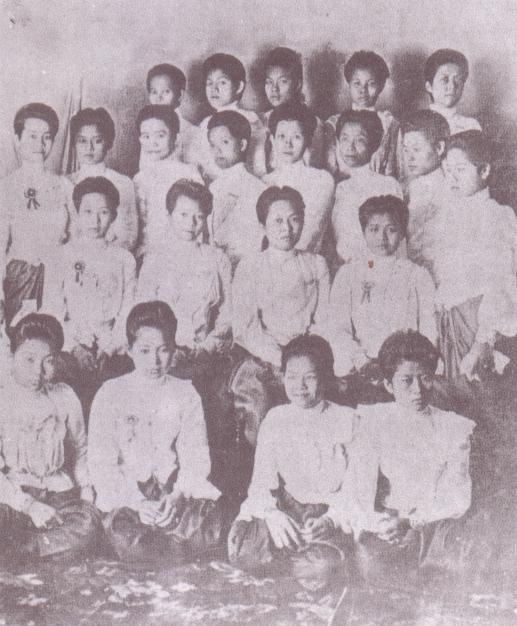
Daughters of King Rama V, 1904

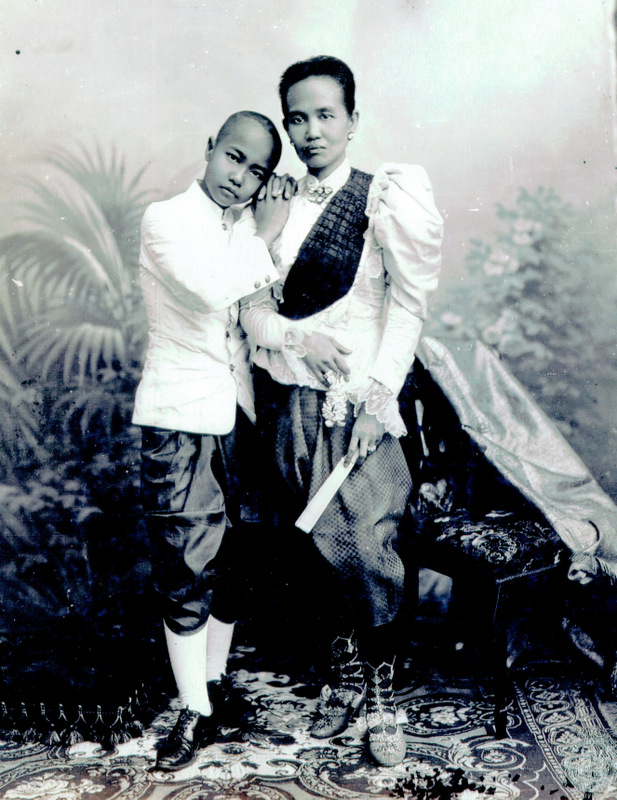
Prince Dilok Noppharat and his mother, Princess Thip Keson of Chiang Mai in 1896

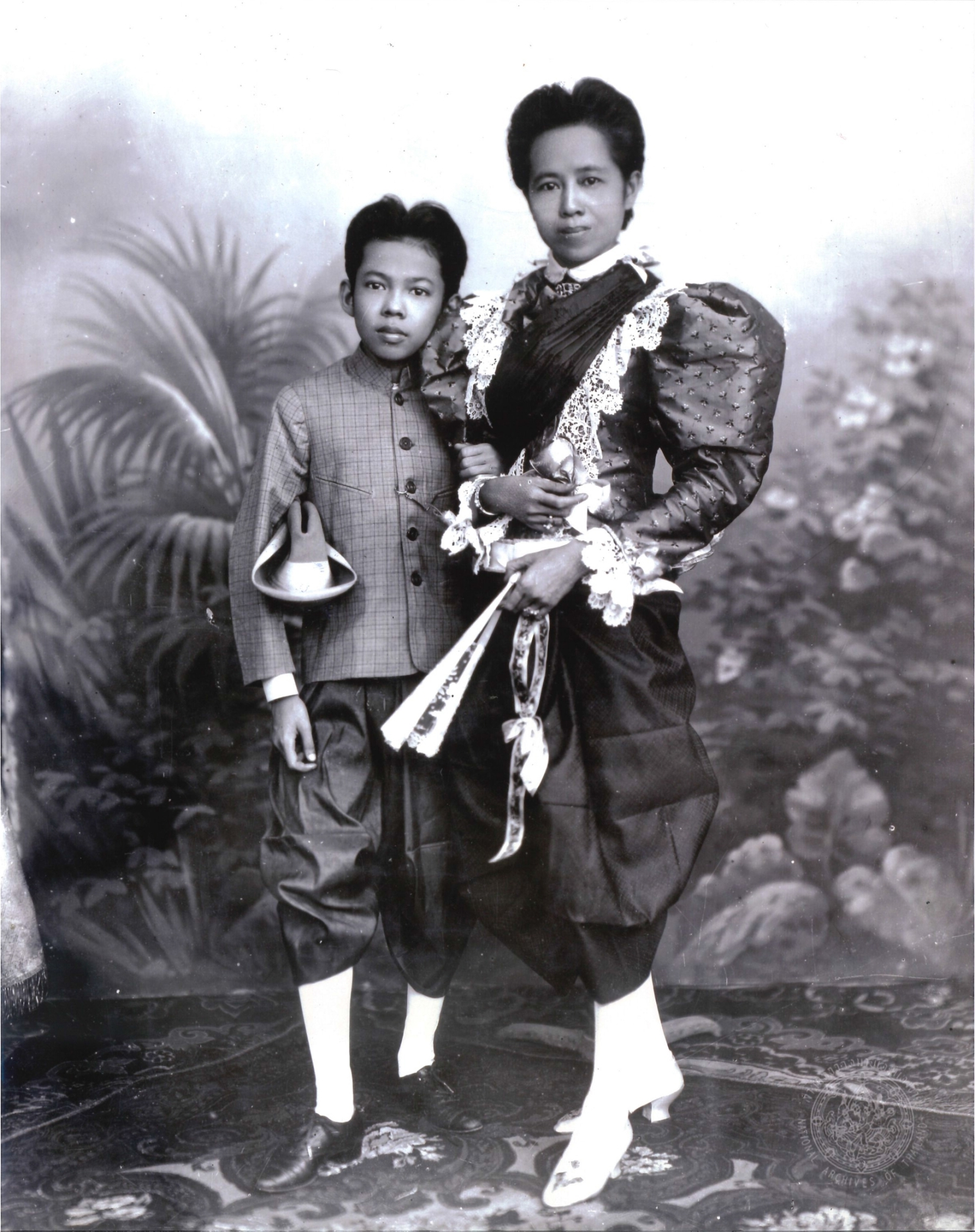
Prince Yugala Dighambara and his mother, Princess Saisavali Bhiromya a consort of King Chulalongkorn (Rama V), before 1905

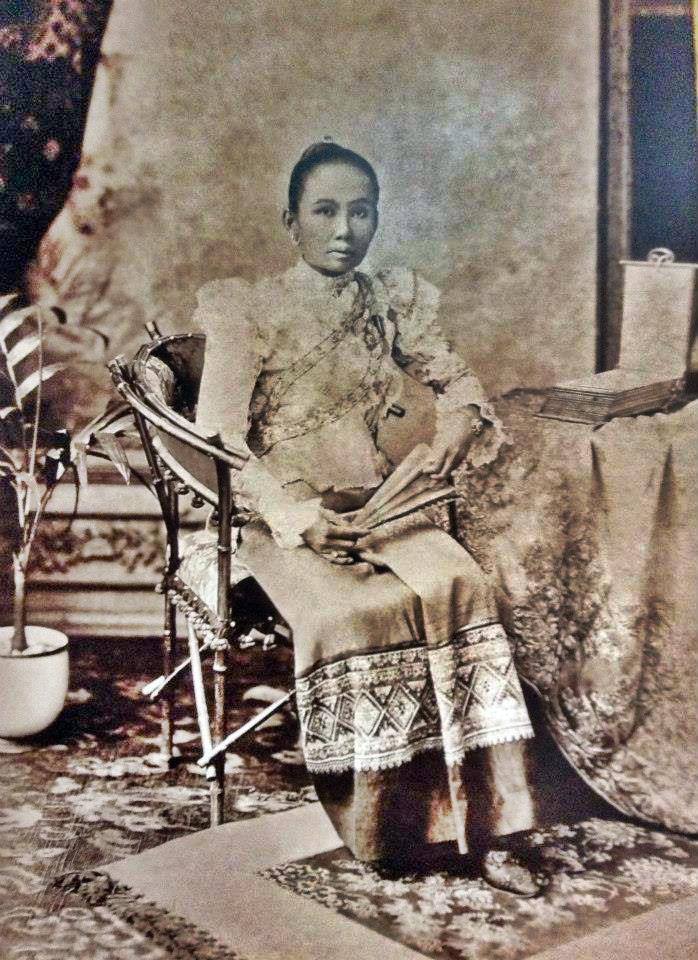
Bualai, was a Princess Consort of Phiriya Thepphawong of Phrae, before 1902

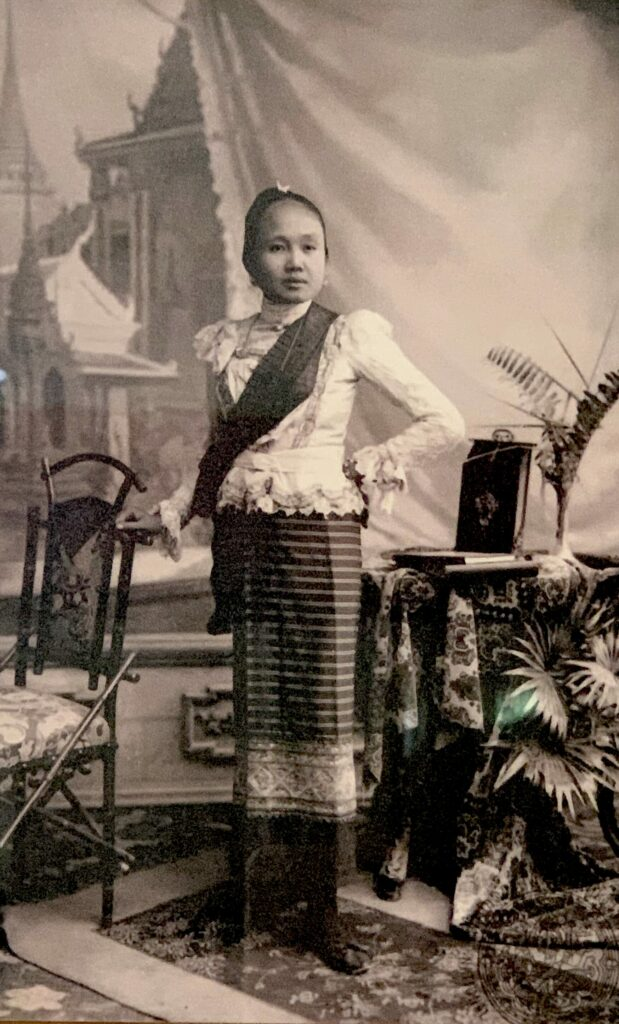
Princess Wiangchuen of Phrae, before 1902

Prince Mahidol Adulyadej with his sister Princess Valaya Alongkorn and his mother, Queen Sri Savarindira (Savang Vadhana), 1925

== Strict Public Mandate ==
On 15 January 1941, Plaek Pibulsonggram issued a Thai cultural mandate to modernize and westernize Thai dress, by deeming long-practiced customs of wearing underpants, wearing no shirt, or wearing a wraparound cloth, as forms of inappropriate public attire.

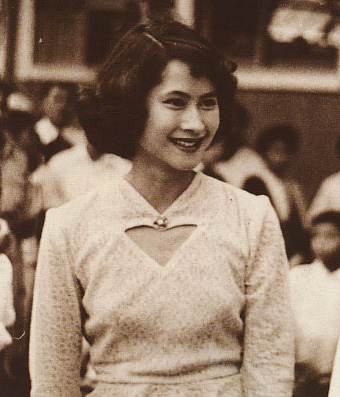
Galyani Vadhana, Princess of Naradiwas in 1941

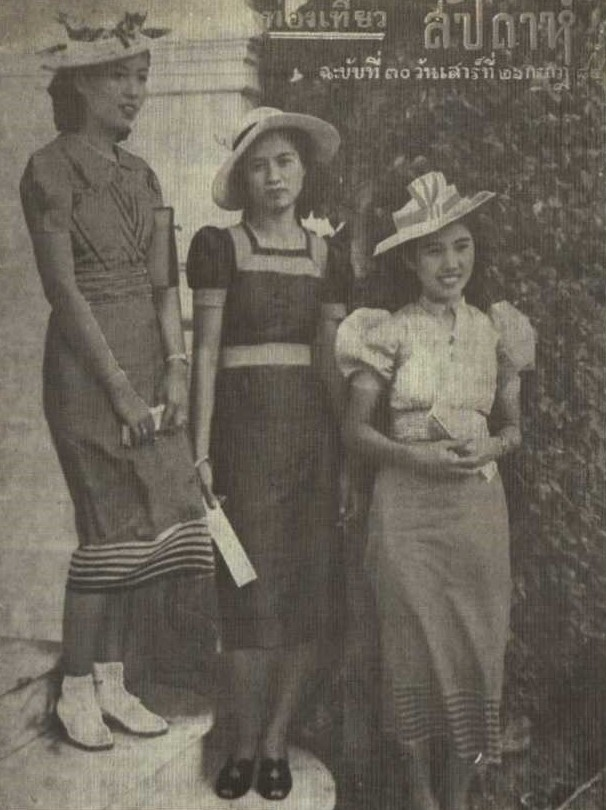
Thai costumes in 1941

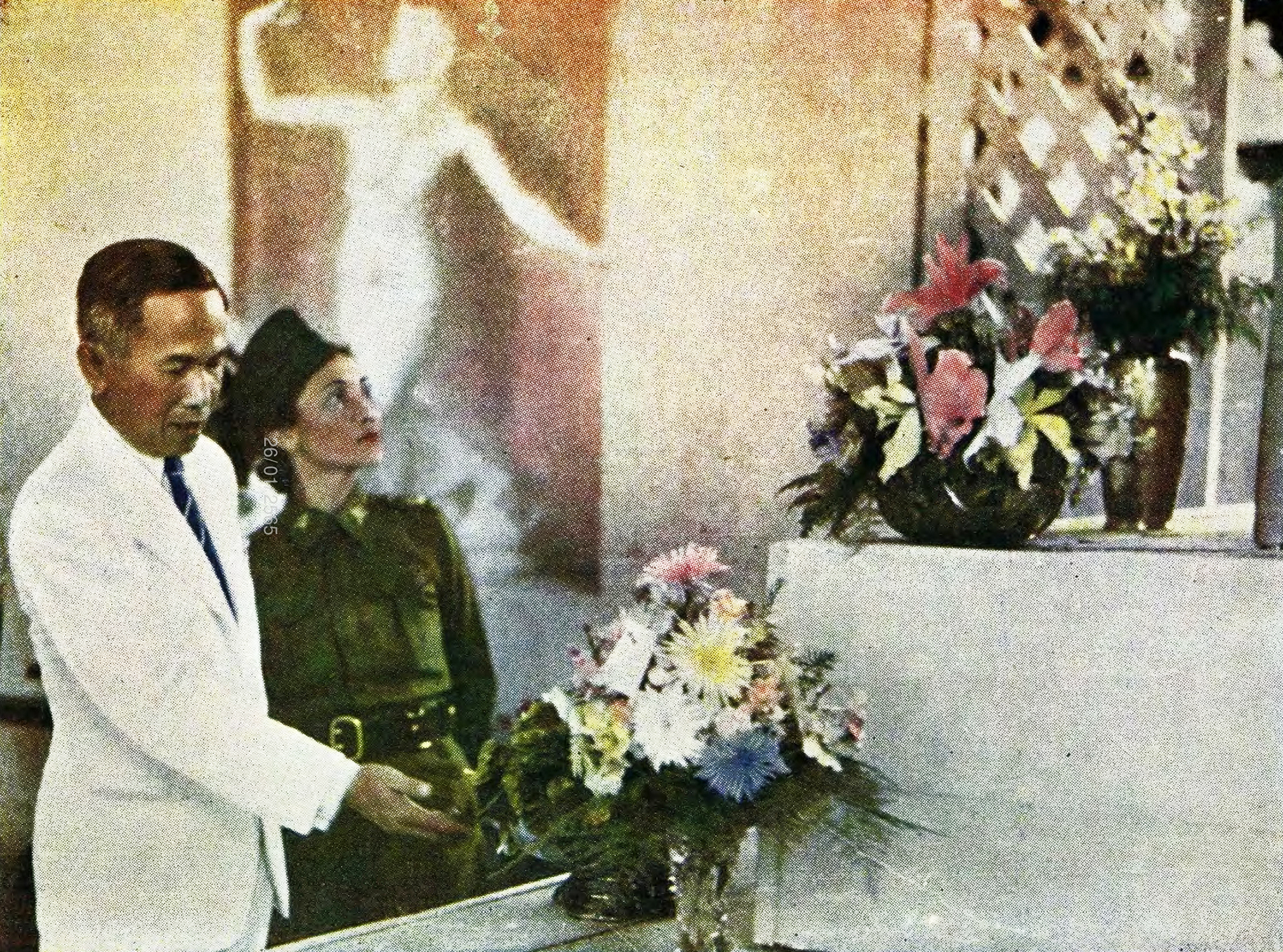
Plaek Pibulsonggram and La-iat Pibulsonggram in 1943

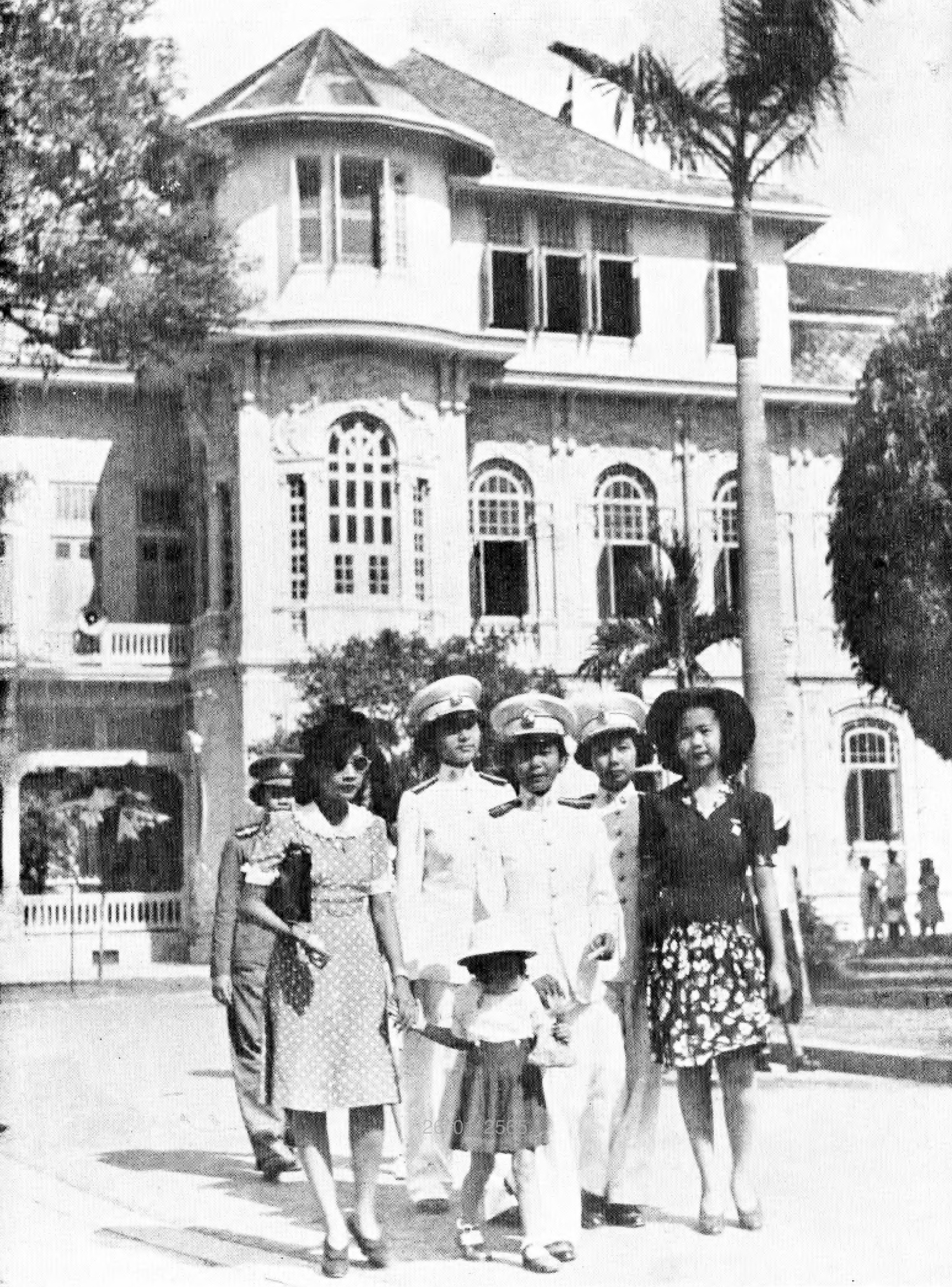
Thai costumes in 1943

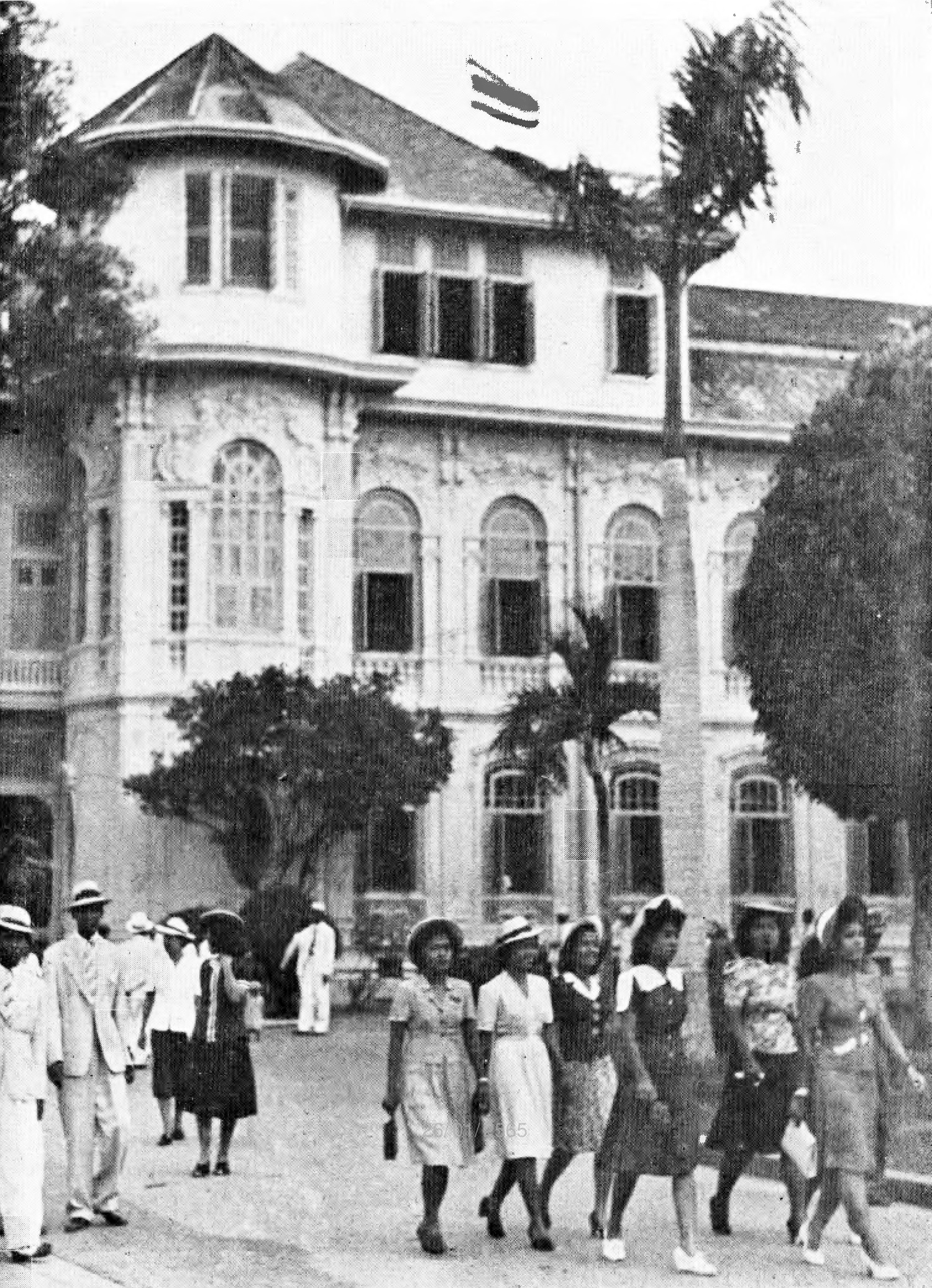
Thai costumes in 1943

== Contemporary Thai clothing ==
The formal Thai costume, known in Thai as ชุดไทยพระราชนิยม (RTGS: chut thai phra ratcha niyom, literally Thai dress of royal endorsement), includes several sets of dress, designed as the Thai national costume in formal occasions. Although described and intended for use as national costume, they are of relatively modern origins, having been conceived in the second half of the 20th century.

Women's clothing

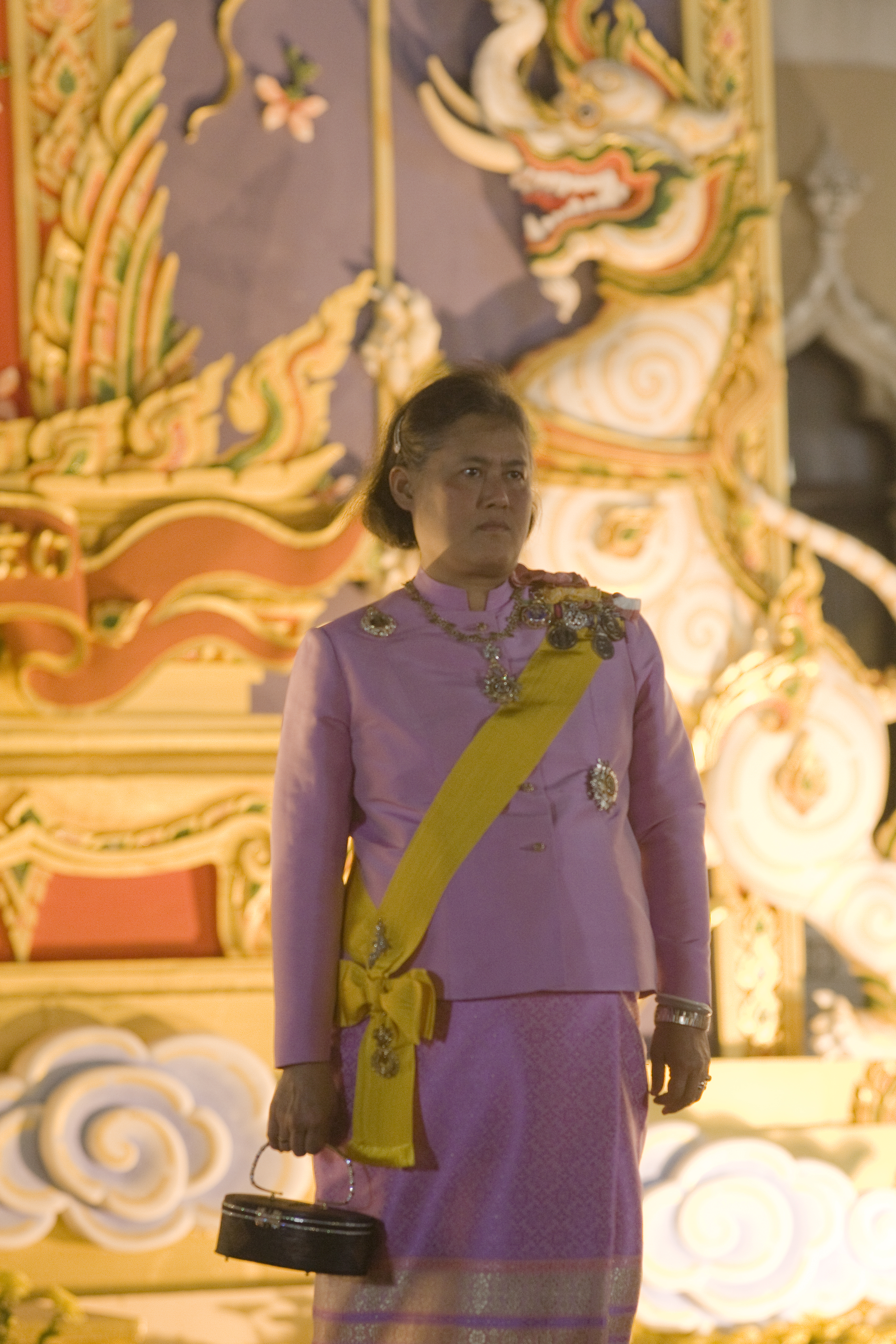
Princess Sirindhorn wearing the "Chut Thai Amarin" (Thai: ชุดไทยอัมรินทร์)

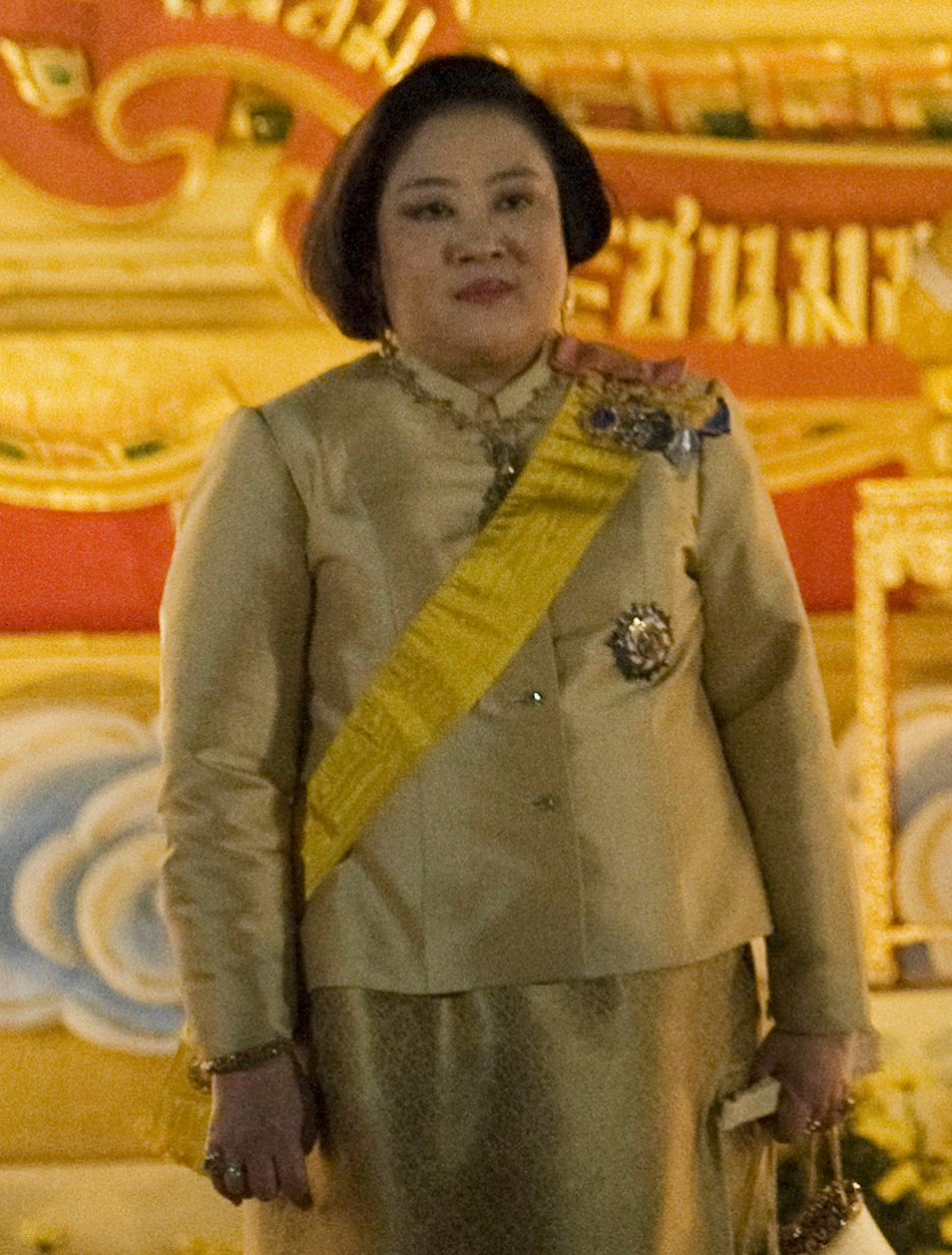
Princess Soamsavali wearing the "Chut Thai Amarin" (Thai: ชุดไทยอัมรินทร์)

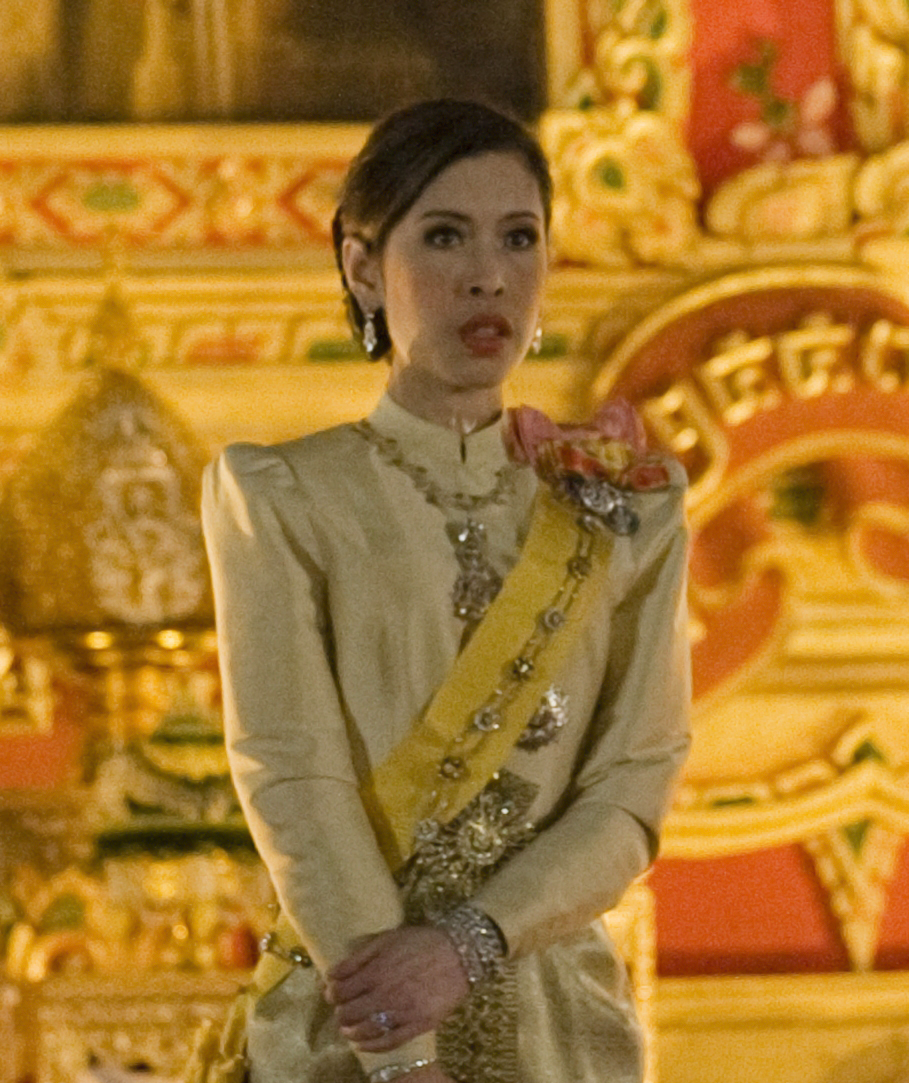
Princess Chulabhorn wearing the "Chut Thai Boromphiman" (Thai: ชุดไทยบรมพิมาน)

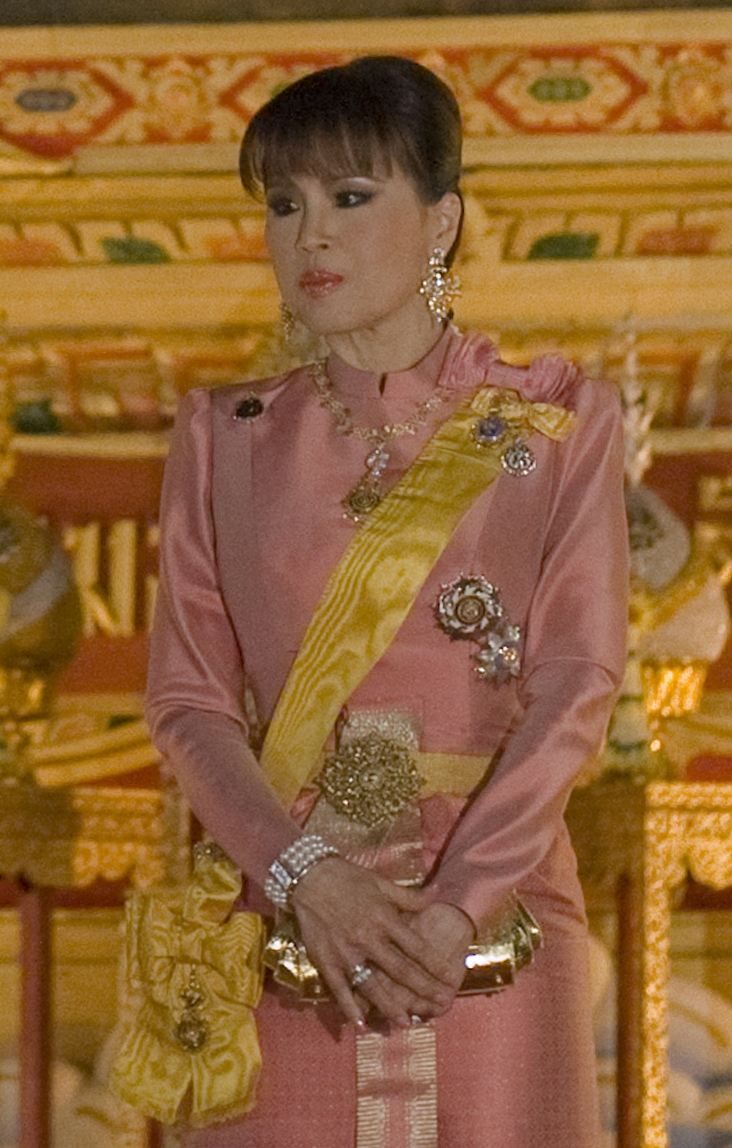
Princess Ubolratana wearing the "Chut Thai Boromphiman" (Thai: ชุดไทยบรมพิมาน)
Men's clothing

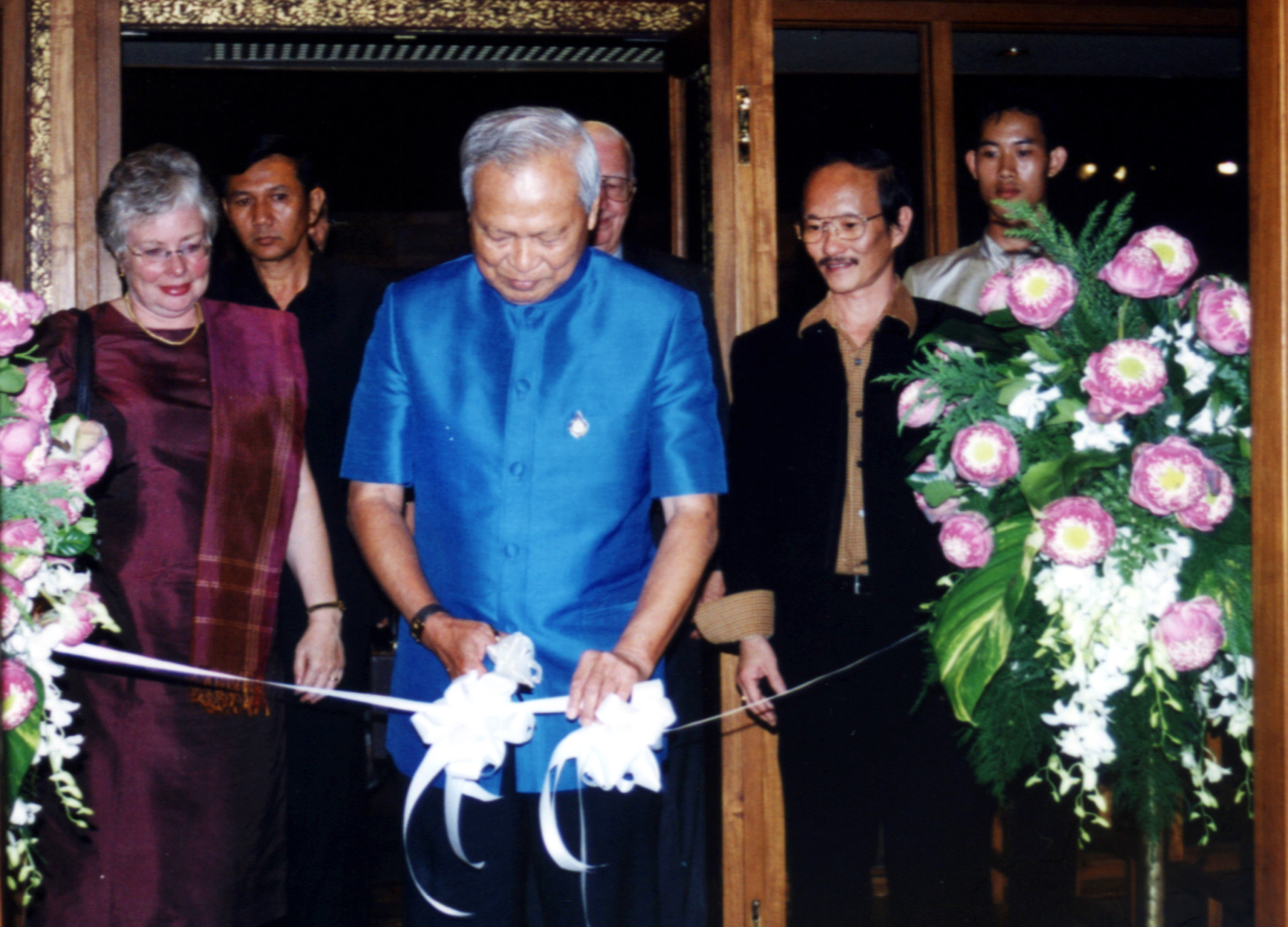
Prem Tinsulanonda, former Thai Prime Minister wearing the "chut thai phra ratcha niyom" (Thai: ชุดไทยพระราชนิยม)

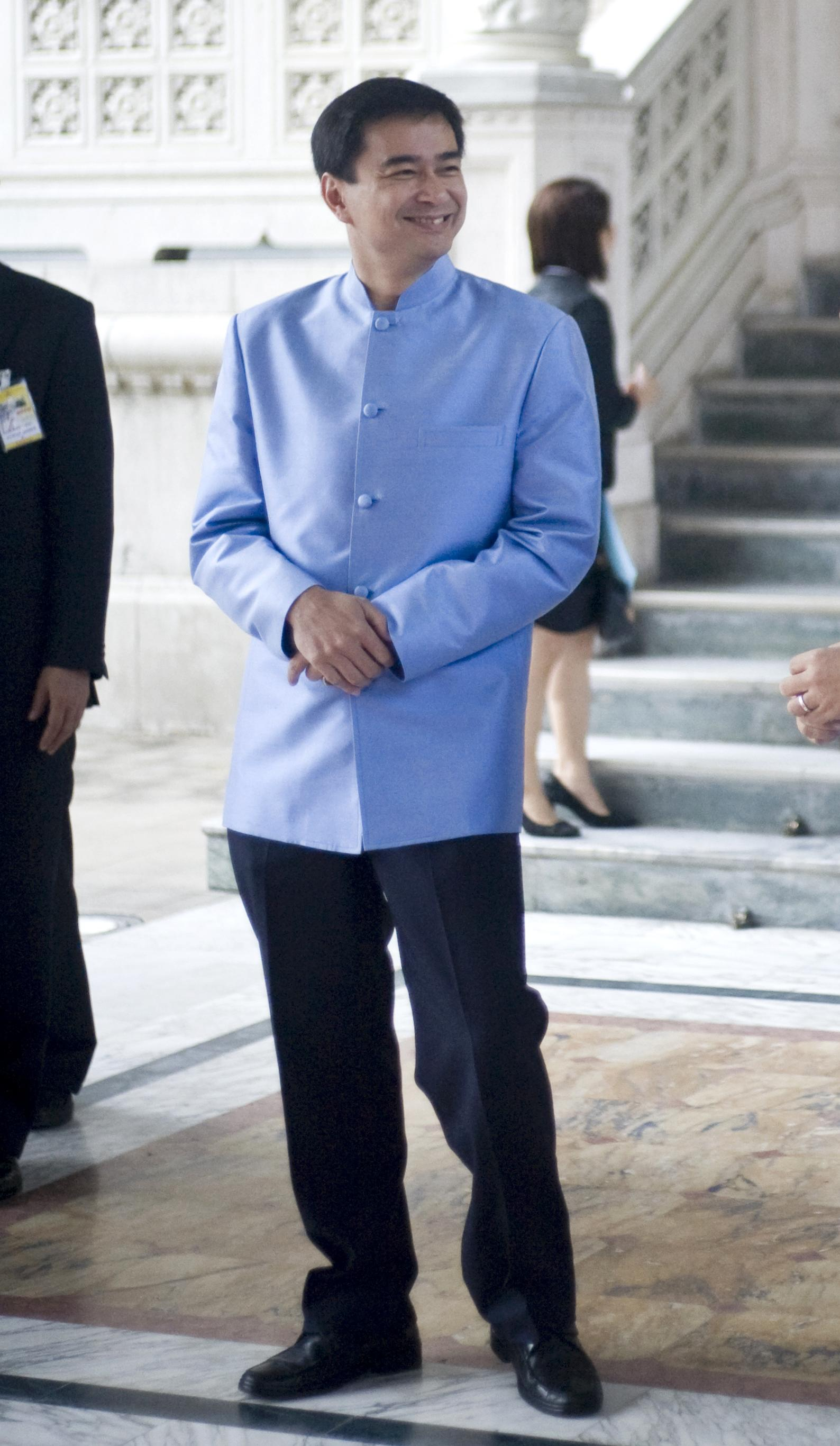
Former Thai Prime Minister Abhisit Vejjajiva wearing the "chut thai phra ratcha niyom" (Thai: ชุดไทยพระราชนิยม)

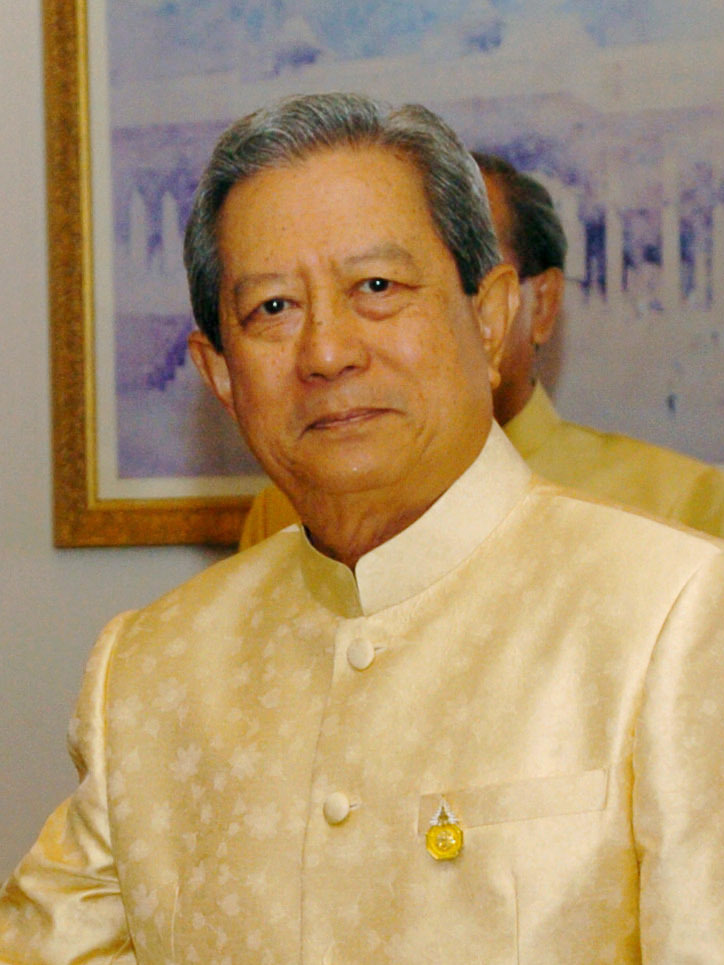
Surayud Chulanont, former Thai Prime Minister wearing the "chut thai phra ratcha niyom" (Thai: ชุดไทยพระราชนิยม)

== See also ==
- Traditional Thai clothing
