= Khrui =

Thai ceremonial garment

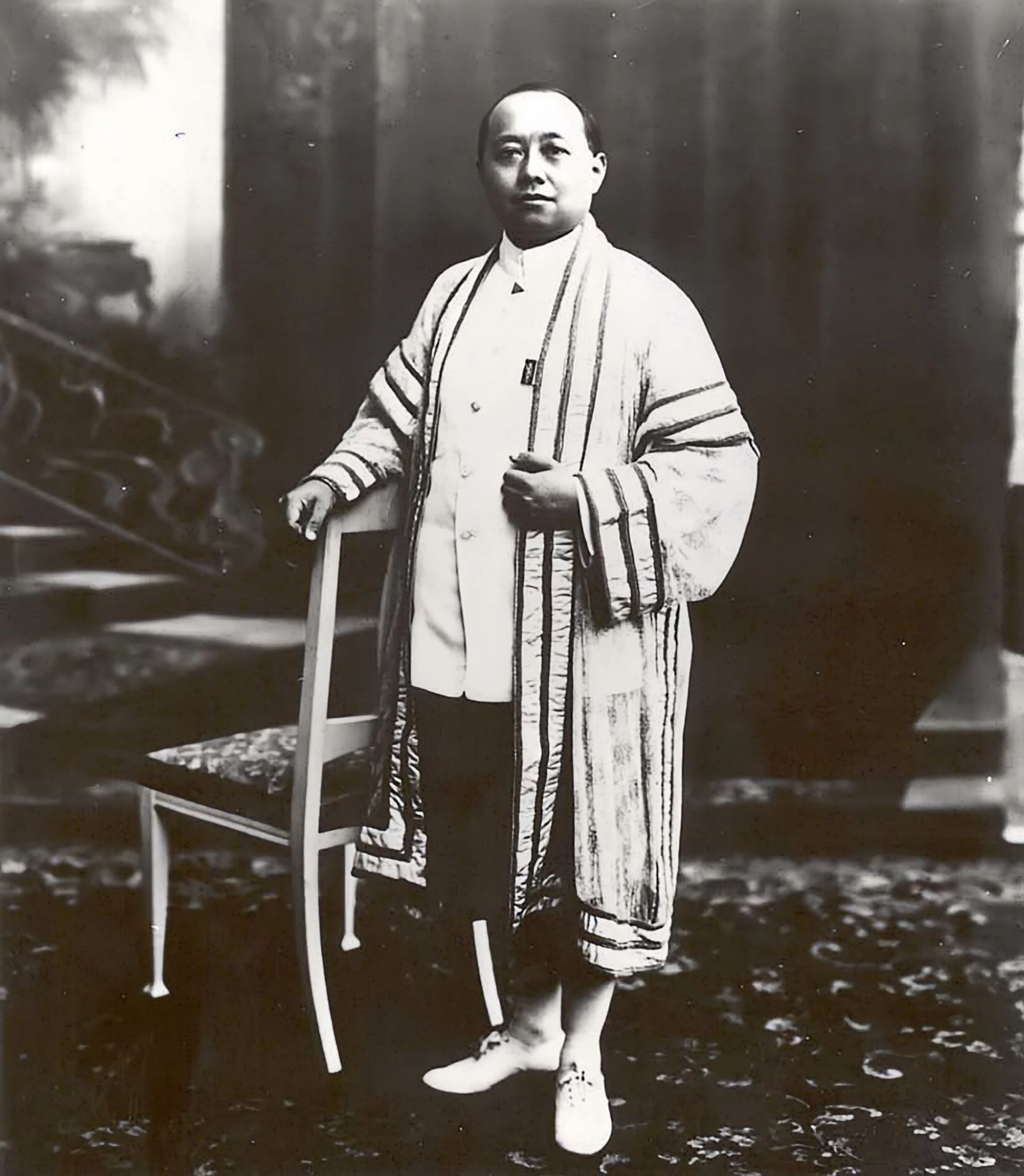
King Vajiravudh wearing the khrui of a barrister-at-law

The khrui (Thai: ครุย, pronounced [kʰrūi]) is a light outer garment worn as a gown or robe in certain ceremonial settings in Thailand. It is long-sleeved and open at the front, and is made of a sheer or mesh fabric, lined with a band of satin, felt or other material, and may be exquisitely embroidered. Dating from at least the 17th century, it was originally worn only in the royal court, but nowadays is most recognisable as the form of academic dress employed by many universities, especially Chulalongkorn University.

== History ==
The exact origins of the khrui are not known, although it has been postulated that it was likely of Persian and/or Indian import. The earliest documentation of its use are from illustrations of the French embassy to King Narai in 1685 and that of Siam to France in 1686, showing the Siamese king and ambassadors wearing such garments. Use of the khrui continued into the Rattanakosin period, as evidenced by mention in the 1804 Law of Three Seals prohibiting its use by junior government officials.

King Vajiravudh (Rama VI) further codified the khrui's use by royal ordinance in 1912, specifying the different types and ranks to be worn by entitled royals and government officials. He later also granted permission for it to be used as the academic dress of the Royal Pages School (Vajiravudh College) in 1913 and Siam's Bar Association in 1915. It was adopted as the academic dress for graduates of Chulalongkorn University in 1930. Since 1967, some other universities have also adopted the khrui as their academic regalia, and the term khrui has acquired the more general meaning of any style of academic or court dress.

== Appearance ==
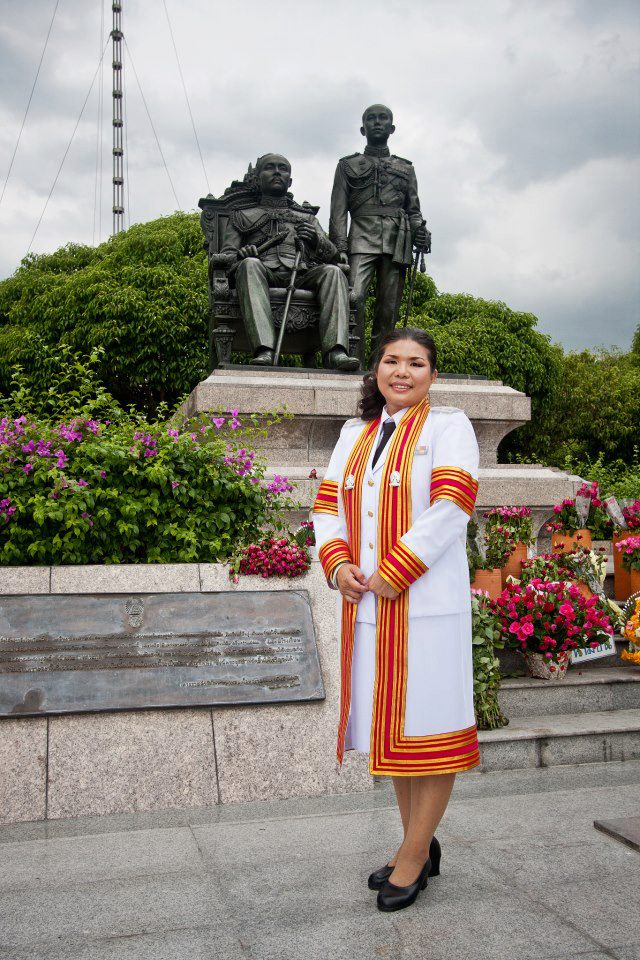
A graduate of Chulalongkorn University wearing the khrui as the university's academic gown

The khrui is a tailored robe, usually knee-to-calf-length, with long sleeves and an open front. It is made of a sheer or mesh fabric, usually white in colour, giving it a translucent appearance. The entire rim and the ends of the sleeves are lined with bands of a thicker material, usually satin, felt, or a substitute, with another like pair of bands encircling the sleeves above elbow level. When used as academic dress, these bands usually bear specific patterns denoting the wearer's affiliated institution and academic degree. When used in ceremonial settings by senior government officials or royalty, the gown may be embroidered with certain patterns of goldwork depending on the rank of the wearer. Khrui used as royal attire differ further in certain details, and may be made of coloured or gold cloth.

== Use ==
Khrui traditionally denoted royal or noble status, and was worn only by men. Members of the royal family would first use it during their sokan (topknot-cutting) ceremony. (Note: A form of tonsure, sokan was a royal ceremony usually performed at the age of 11 or 13 and marked passage from childhood into adolescence and adulthood.) The king would wear it on special occasions such as his coronation, royal processions or when receiving special audiences. Its use by nak (Note: Thai for nāga, a term honouring a legendary nāga from the time of the Buddha.)—novices preparing to undergo upasampada (Buddhist ordination)—is the only occasion where the khrui is worn regardless of a person's social rank.

According to the 1912 ordinance, persons may be entitled to wear khrui through rank, office, or further royal permission. Entitled ranks include Grand Companions and above of the Order of Chula Chom Klao and Knight Commanders and above of the Orders of the White Elephant or the Crown of Thailand. Judges may wear it during full dress royal ceremonies; other government officials may wear it during such ceremonies if they are performing certain addresses, or if it has been specified for the occasion. Such occasions are nowadays rare, though the khrui is still seen in the ceremonial costumes worn during the annual Royal Ploughing Ceremony and occasional royal processions.

Today, the khrui is most readily identified as the academic dress of several Thai universities, Chulalongkorn University being its oldest and most prominent adopter. It is worn without a cap, over the university's dress uniform (usually a raj pattern jacket and white trousers for males, white blouse and navy skirt for females) for undergraduate degrees, or a suit and tie for graduate degrees. Like most of its counterparts, it use in this form is usually seen only during graduation ceremonies.

== Gallery ==
=== Royal gowns ===
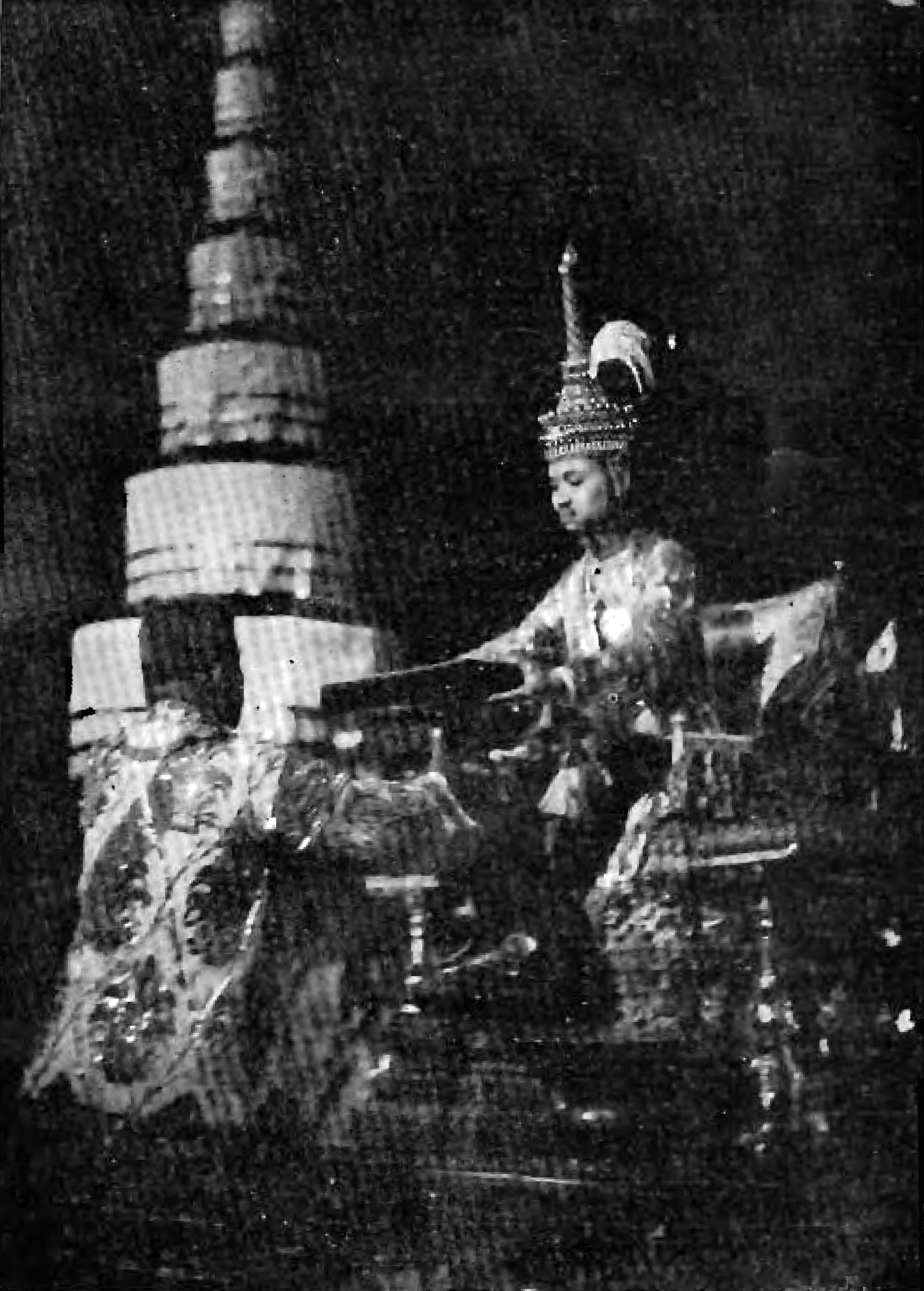
King Prajadhipok signs the Constitution of the Kingdom of Siam, Buddhist Era 2475 (1932), on 10 December 1932, wearing the Gown of the Great House of Chakri (ครุยมหาจักรีบรมราชวงศ์; Khrui Maha Chakkri Boromma Ratchawong) and the Crown of Five Tops (ชฎาห้ายอด; Chada Ha Yot).

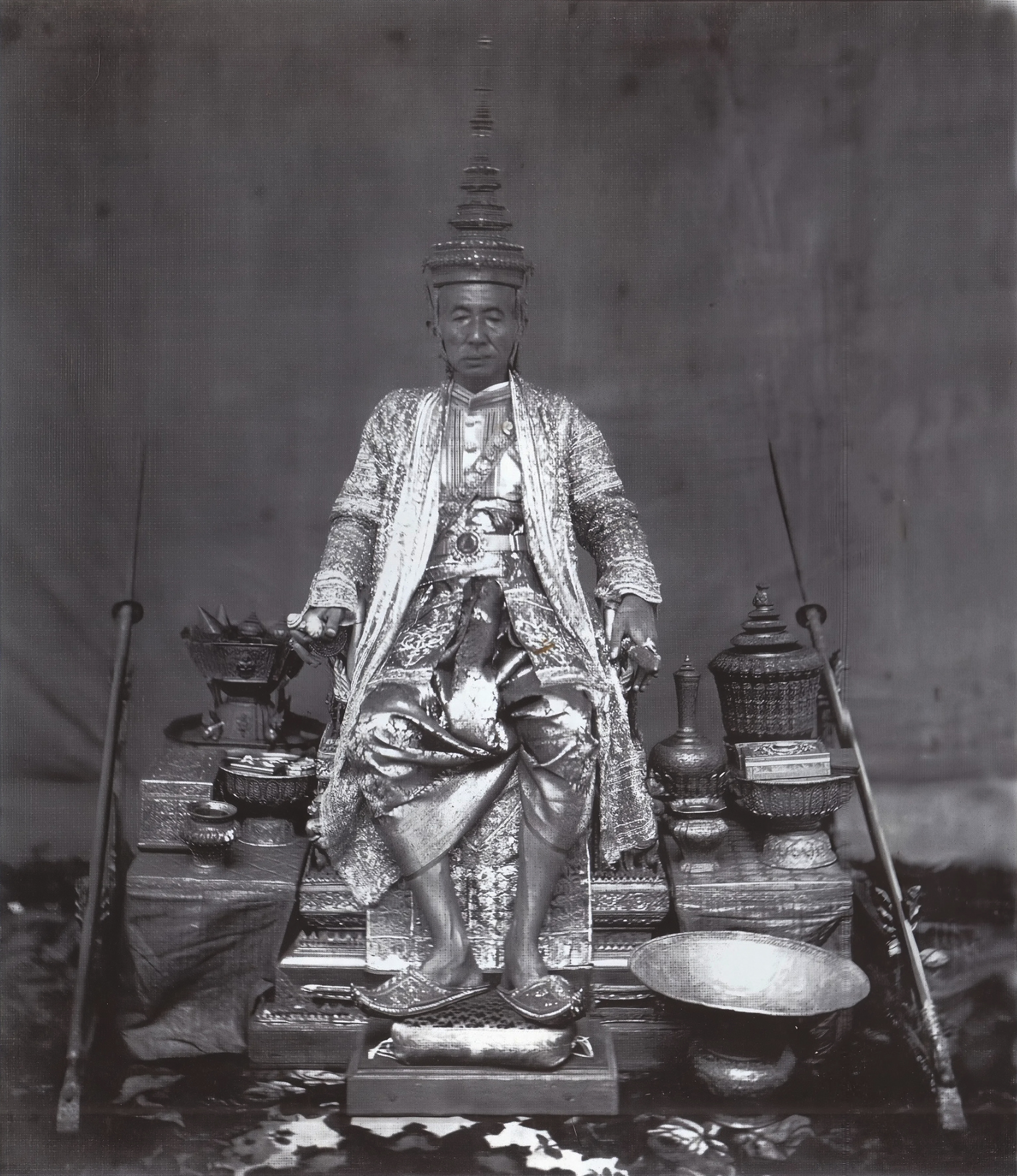
King Mongkut wears the Gown of the Great House of Chakri, the Great Crown of Victory and the Royal Slippers; photo taken around 1851.

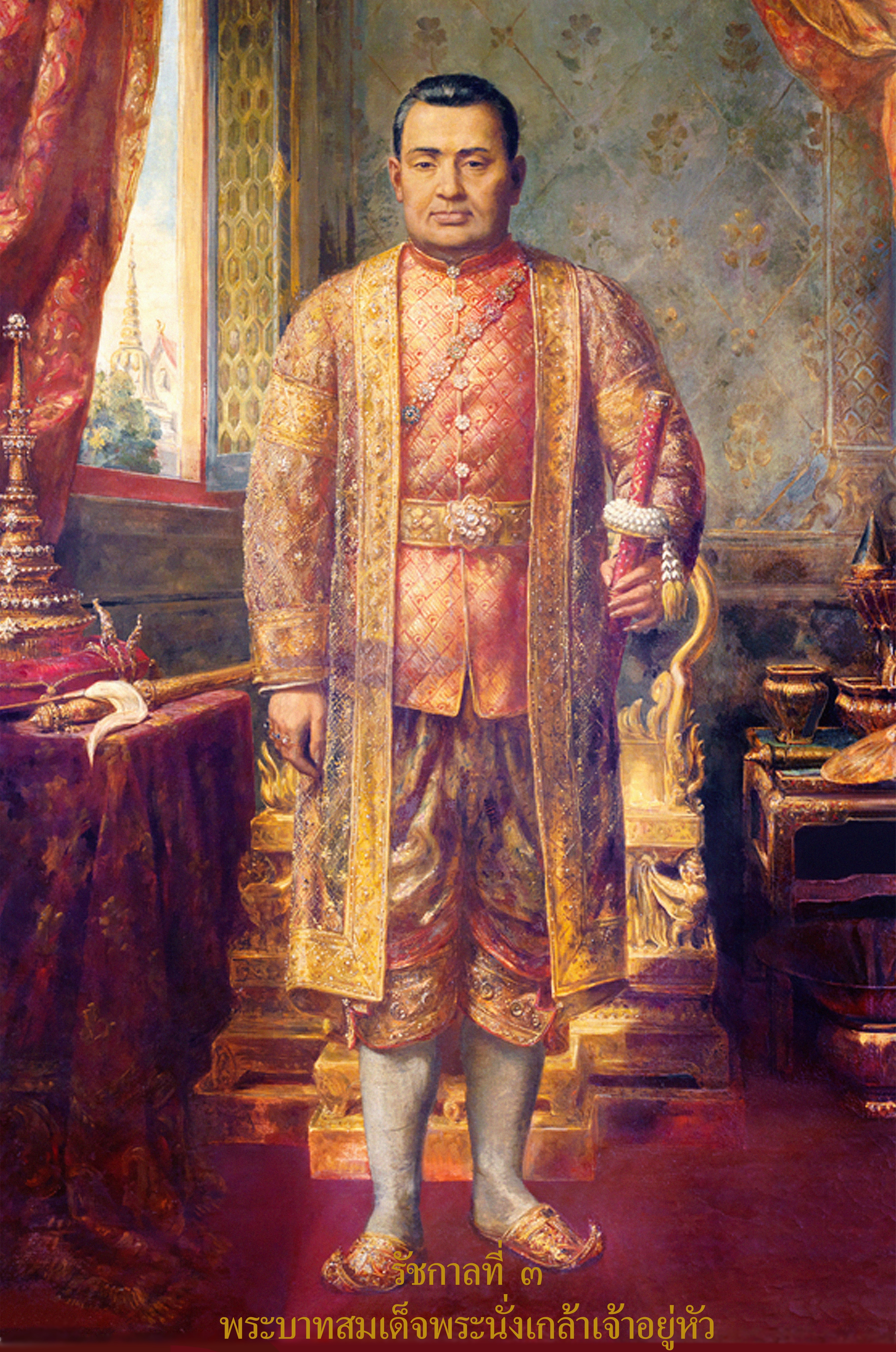
A painting depicts King Nangklao wearing the Gown of the Great House of Chakri.

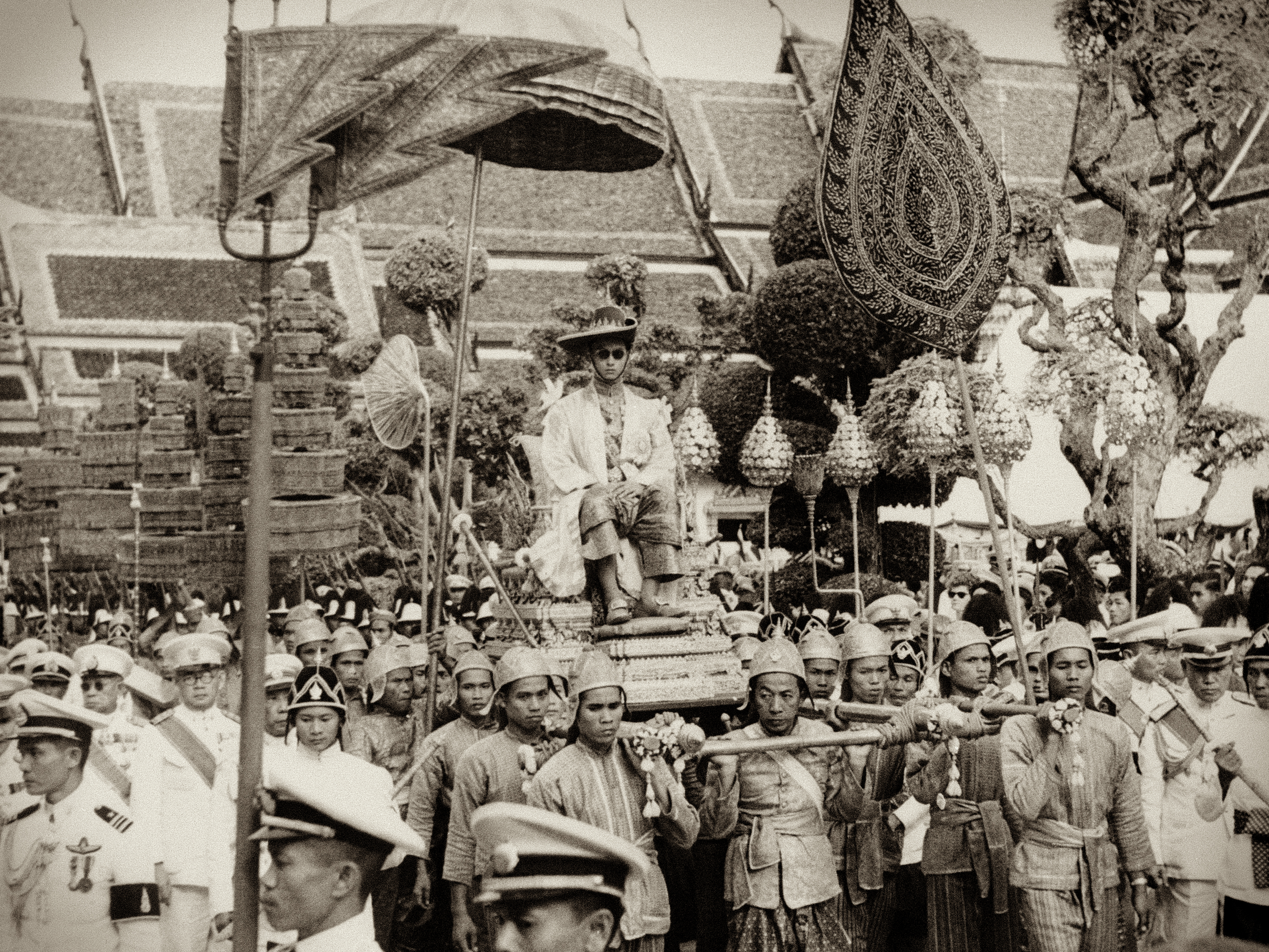
Proceeding from the Grand Palace to the Temple of the Emerald Buddha on 5 May 1950, King Bhumibol Adulyadej wears the Gold-Woven Gown (ครุยกรองทอง; Khrui Krong Thong). Part of the Coronation of the Thai monarch.

=== Official gowns ===
==== "Nobleman's Gown" ====
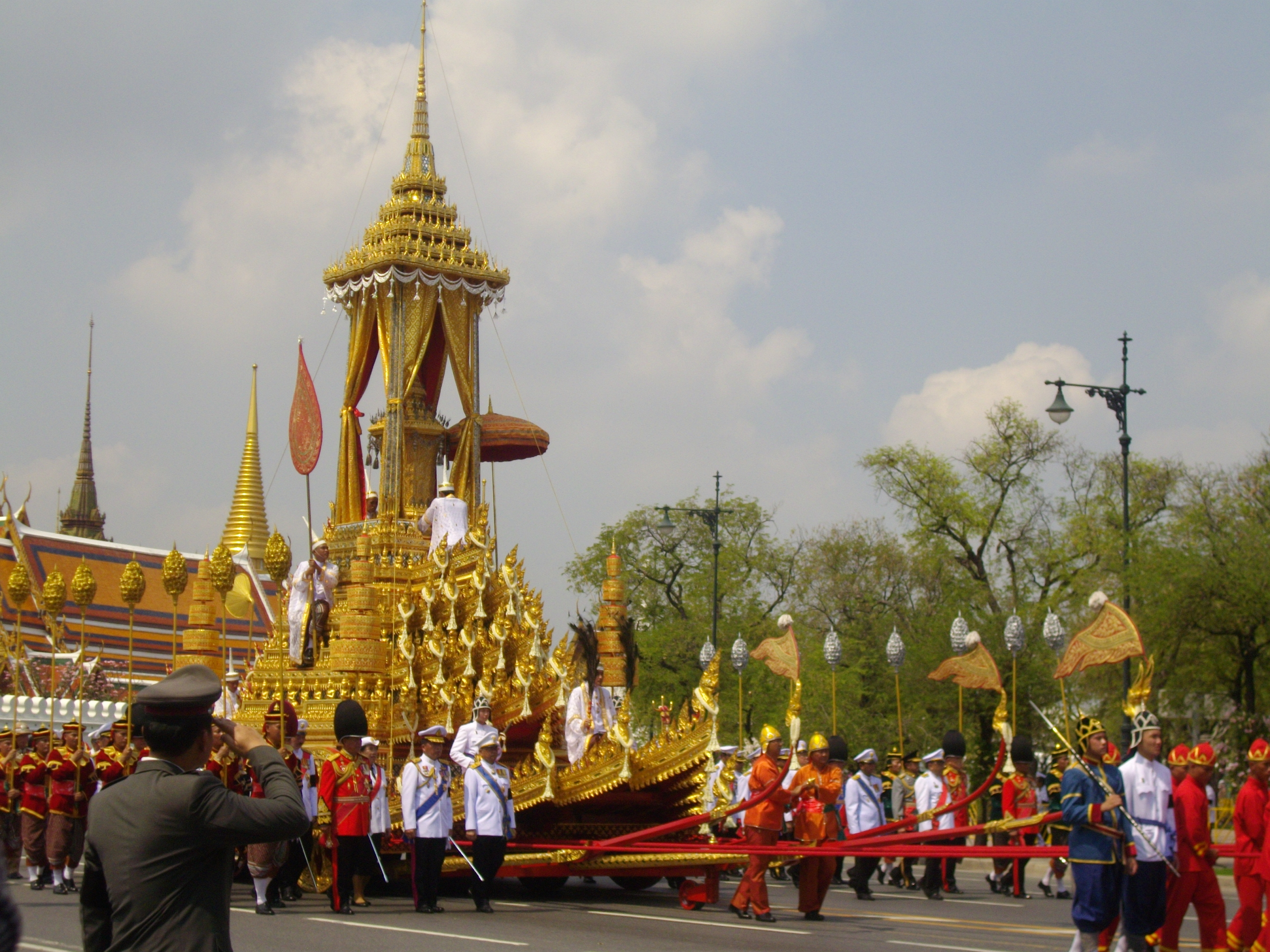
The officers on the Chariot of Great Victory wear the Nobleman's Gowns (ครุยขุนนาง; Khrui Khun Nang) together with the ancient official headgear called Lomphok (ลอมพอก). The Chariot is carrying the urn of Princess Bejaratana Rajasuda to the crematorium at Sanam Luang on 9 April 2012.

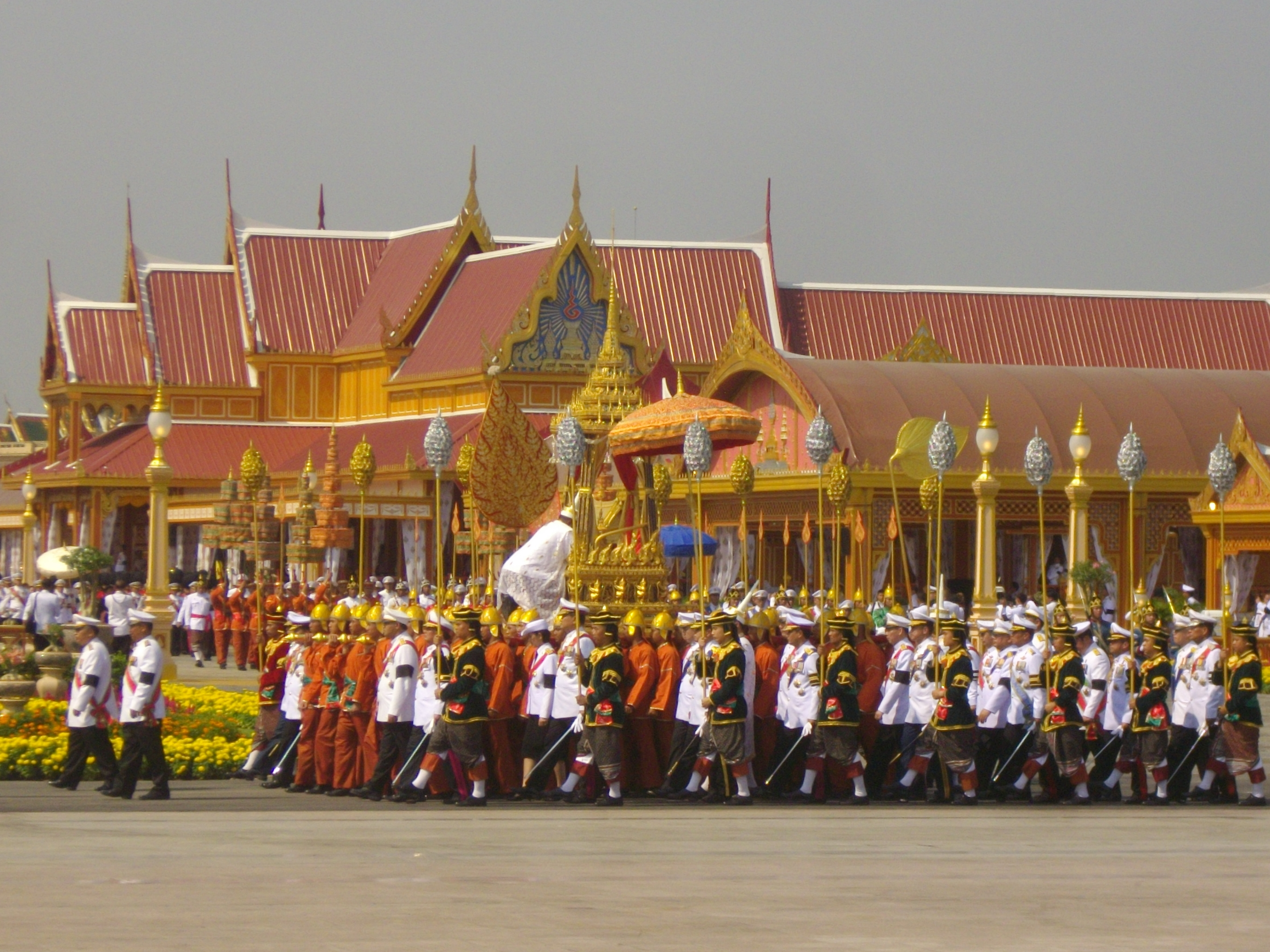
An officer supporting the urn of Princess Bejaratana Rajasuda on the Lord's Palanquin wears the Nobleman's Gown and the Lomphok, 10 April 2012.

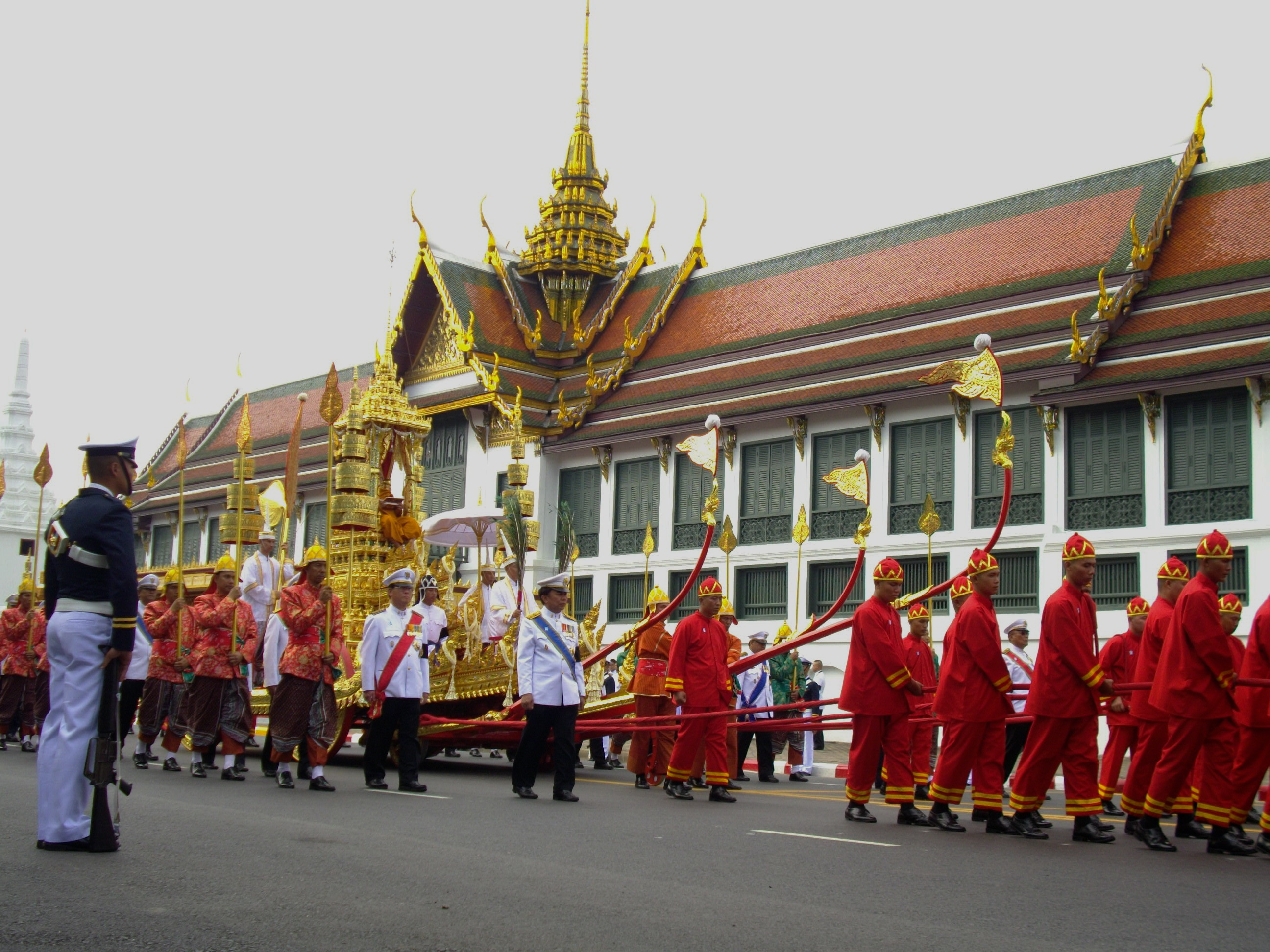
The officers on the Minor Chariot wear the Nobleman's Gown and the Lomphok. The Chariot is carrying The Most Reverend Somdet Phra Wannarat (Chun Phrommakhutto), the Abbot of Wat Bowonniwet Vihara, on 15 November 2008.

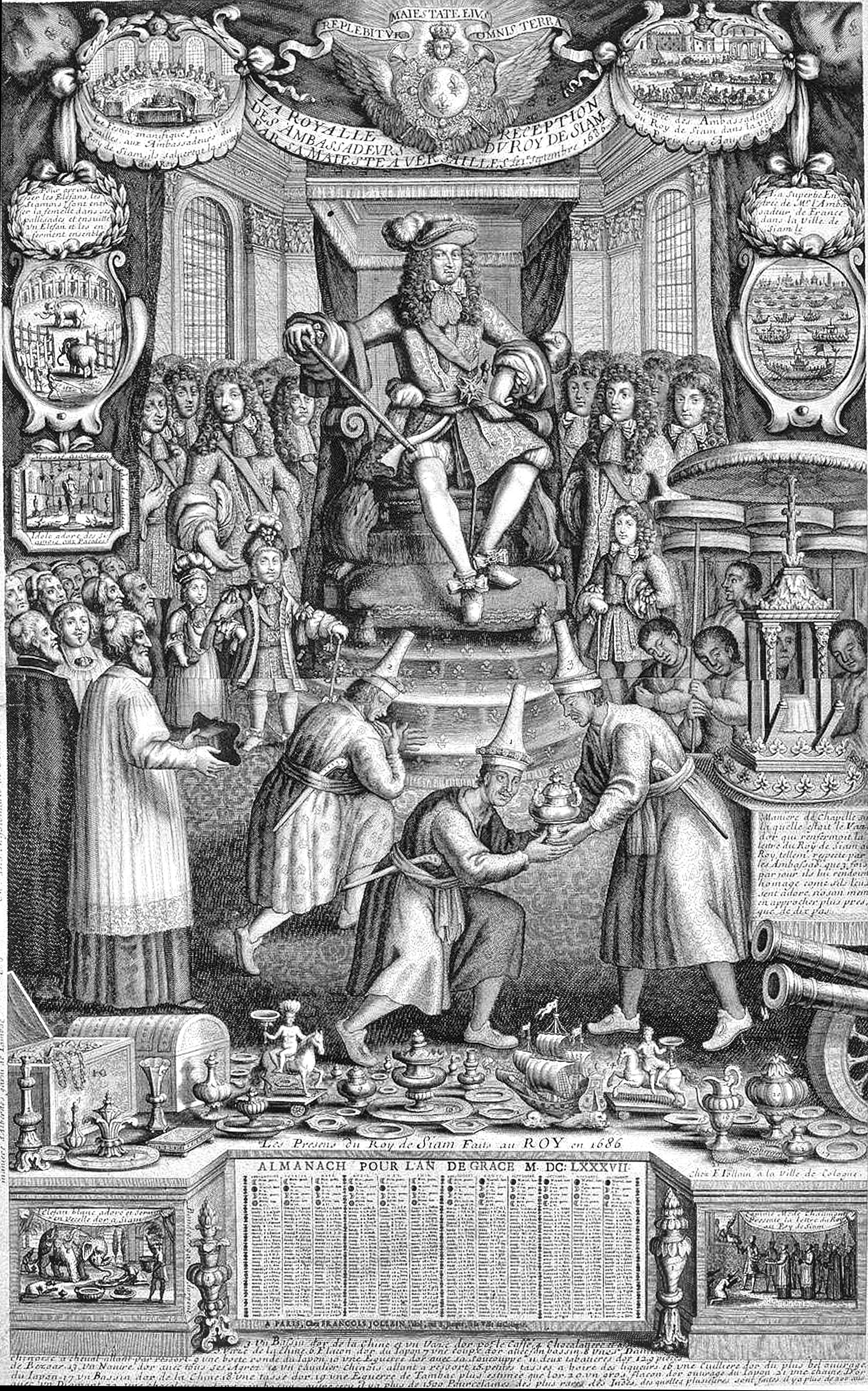
A French drawing depicts Siamese diplomats, including Kosa Pan, wearing the Nobleman's Gown and the Lomphok while having an audience with Louis XIV in 1687.

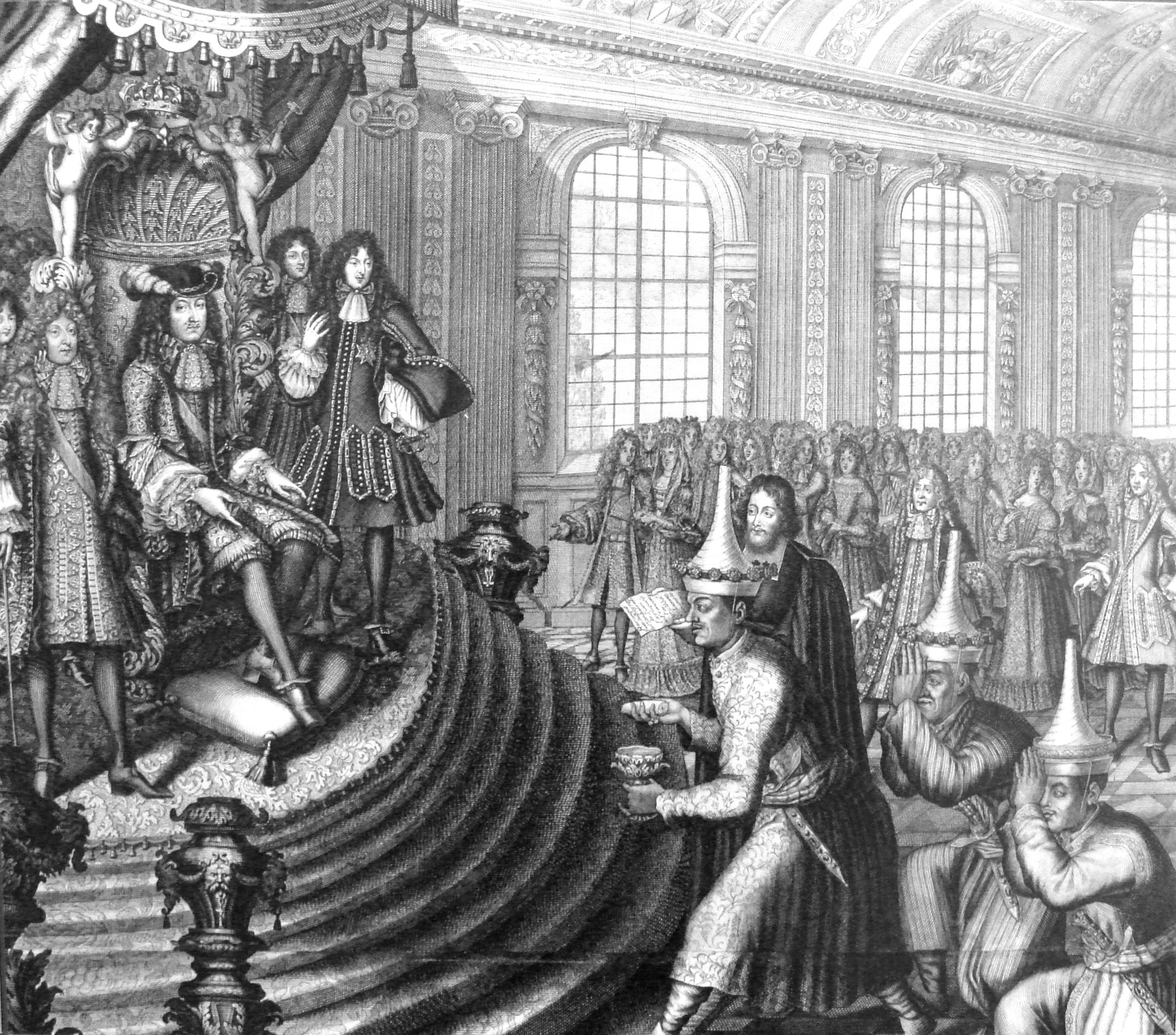
A French drawing depicts Siamese diplomats wearing the Nobleman's Gown and the Lomphok while presenting King Narai's missive to Louis XIV in 1687.

==== "Ministerial Gown" ====
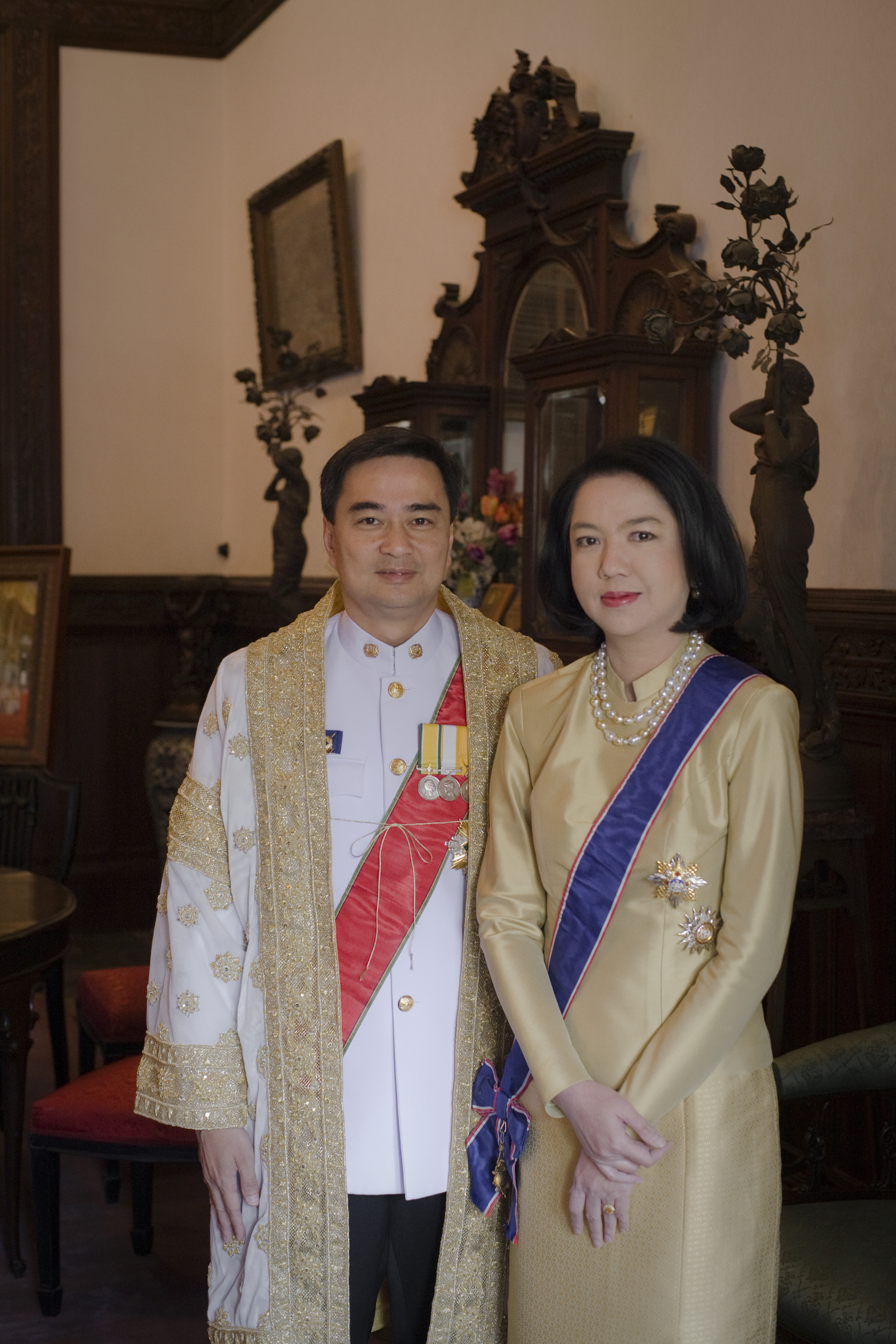
Prime Minister Abhisit Vejjajiva wears the First-Class Ministerial Gown (ครุยเสนามาตย์ชั้นเอก; Khrui Senamat Chan Ek). This golden brocaded gown was part of the traditional attire of the Chief Minister of the Civil Service in ancient times and is now still in ceremonial use.

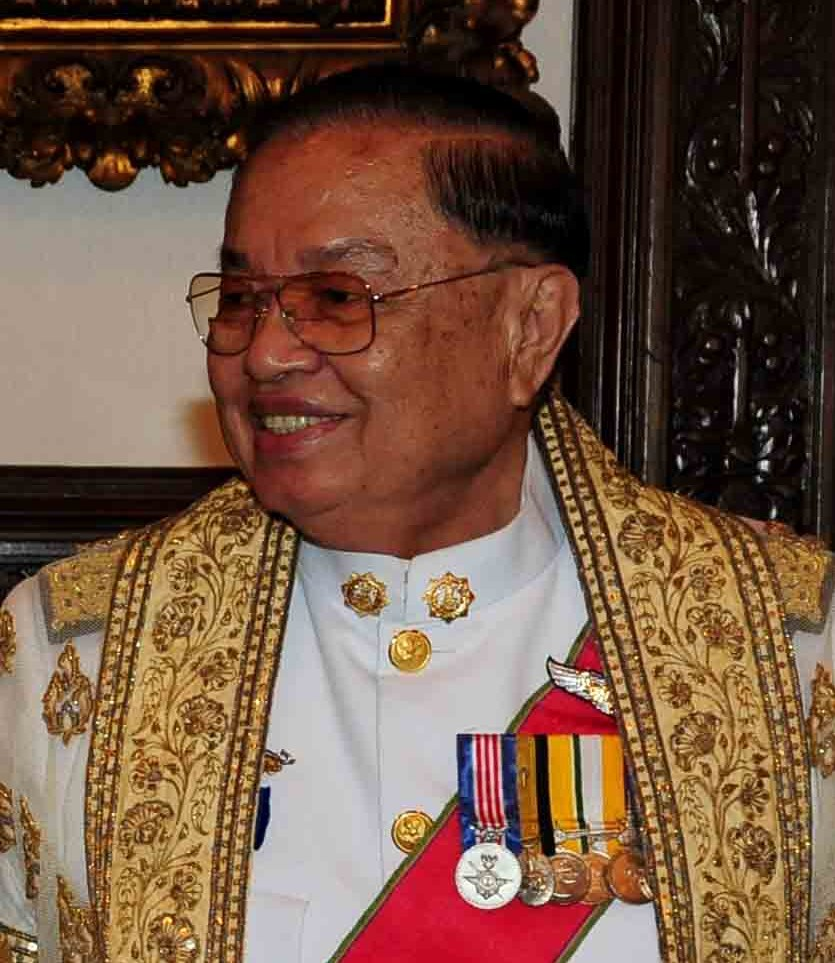
Chai Chidchob wears the Second-Class Ministerial Gown (ครุยเสนามาตย์ชั้นโท; Khrui Senamat Chan Tho). A recipient of the first or second class of the Order of Chula Chom Klao is entitled to wear this gown.

=== Academic gowns ===
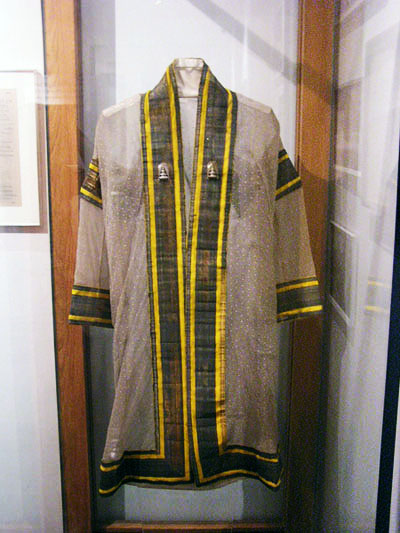
An academic gown of Chulalongkorn University, worn by King Prajadhipok.

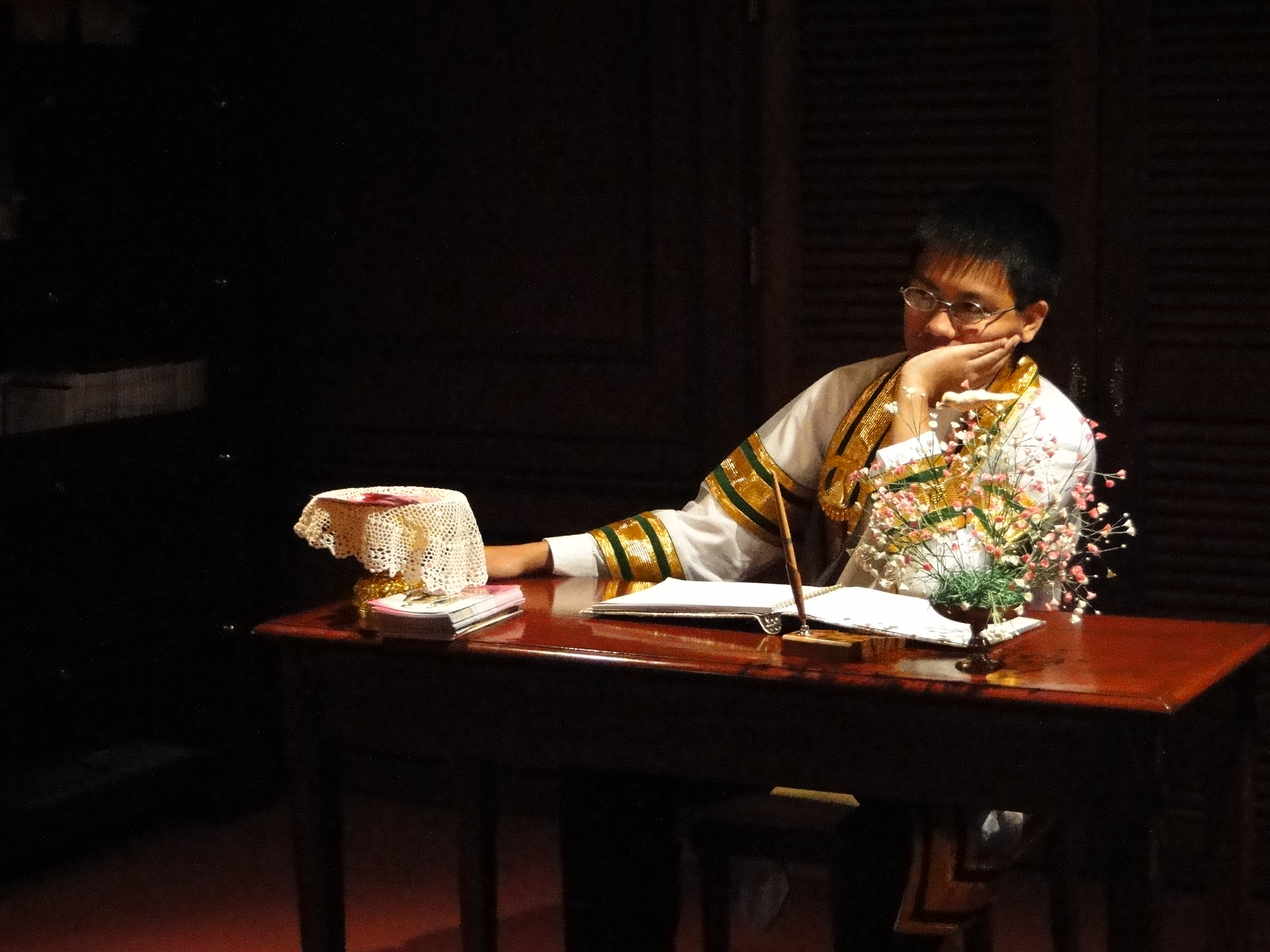
A graduate of Sukhothai Thammathirat Open University wears the university's academic gown.

== See also ==
- Academic dress of Chulalongkorn University
