= Academic dress of Chulalongkorn University =

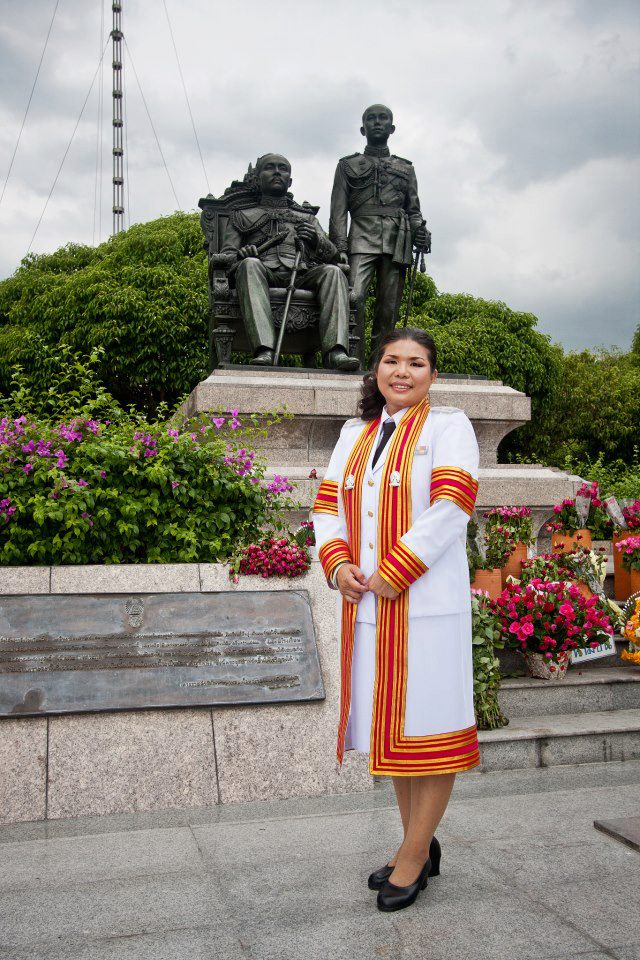
PhD graduate wearing an academic gown (Graduate School) over a civil servant uniform. The gown can also be worn with formal dresses.

The academic dress of Chulalongkorn University (Thai: ครุยวิทยฐานะของจุฬาลงกรณ์มหาวิทยาลัย) in Thailand is a long-sleeved gown made from light mesh, faced and bordered with a specially designed felt strip. The same strip is also attached to elbows and wrists. The gown itself is adapted from the ceremonial attire called khrui, traditionally worn by government executives and peers to reflect their status. The gown and the academic badge were devised during Prajadhipok's reign.

The gown is open-front and calf-length, resembling the dress used in the United Kingdom, but without hood and cap. Yoke is not gathered or pleated; and sleeves are not loose. Degree and status of the wearer are reflected by colour of the felt strip. The colour scheme is similar to one used in many universities in the United Kingdom, such as the University of Oxford, University of Bristol and University of Manchester.

To comply with regulations and due to its transparency, the gown must be worn over an official or formal dress. Since its invention, many Thai universities adopted the similar gown but with different patterns for their graduates.

== History ==
Since the establishment of Chulalongkorn Civil Service College in 1899, there was no symbol marking the graduation of students. In 1914, Vajiravudh ordered the academic badge to be designed. Graduates and school employees may pin the badge on the left chest, just like wearing the academic gown. The gown, however, was not yet designed since Chulalongkorn's Civil Service College was unable to confer the bachelor's degree or beyond; only a diploma was issued to graduates.

As the college gained the university status in 1917, its academics were rapidly enhanced to the extent that it began granting degrees in 1928. The idea of a well-designed and respectable academic dress was raised. At that time, the use of khrui was strictly limited that it can only be worn by pre-ordained monks, royal family members and government ministers. Due to the restriction, the university asked Prajadhipok for the permission to use the traditional gown. The university also discussed the most suitable pattern of dress and the corresponding regulation with the ministers for education and justice. Finally, the king asked that the discussion must be made among ministers and himself. This resulted in the introduction of the present design in 1930.

For bachelors and masters, the gowns are decorated with a black felt strip. These resemble black BA and MA gowns used by Oxford, Cambridge and many British universities. Black, according to the Thai astrology, also symbolizes Saturday, Vajiravudh's birthday. Doctor's gown are faced with a scarlet strip, which is similar to the colour of Oxford's full-dress doctoral gown. Scarlet also represents Chulalongkorn's birthday. Despite similar colour schemes, shapes of the British and Thai gowns are completely different. Thai gown tends to be simpler. The sleeves are as long as wrist and cylindrical in shape for all degrees and statuses. The colours apply only to the strip, not to the whole gown. There is no special gown for graduates honoris causa. Doctorates, whether honorary or earned, wear the same gown. British gown, on the other hand, has more sophisticated features. These include a gathered or pleated yoke, a flap collar, different sleeve styles for different degrees, various types of hood, and headgear. British and commonwealth universities often have a distinctively designed gown for honorary graduates, which are often different from that for PhDs.

Another distinctive design with a light yellow facing is reserved for King of Thailand, who is the university's official visitor. In 1980, another kind of academic dress for lecturers and university council members was designed in similar pattern to the graduates, but faced and bordered with pink felt.

== Specification ==
Academic dress consists of a long-sleeved gown, faced and bordered with 10 cm-wide felt strip, decorated with golden brocade. The elbow and wrist is wrapped with the same strip. For the king's gown, the yellow facing is used and 5 cm-wide brocade is attached centrally. Two more 1 cm brocade strips are added to both sides of the felt strip. Silver Phra Kiao badges are pinned to the breast portion of the felt strip.

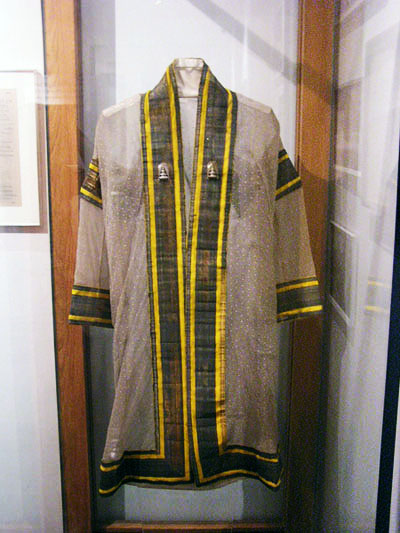
Prajadhipok's royal academic dress (as Visitor to the University)

For those who are admitted to the doctoral degree, a gown with scarlet facing is used. Two 1 cm brocade strips are added to the outer edges of the felt strip. 0.75 cm blank, 0.5 cm tape, 0.75 cm blank and 1 cm tape are stitched in respective order from outer tapes to the centre. A felt coloured band is attached to the centre of the felt strip, corresponding to the faculty (not to the degree granted). If the degree is awarded in the name of the whole university rather than the faculty, the pink band is stitched. This also applies when the faculty does not have its colour. Similar to the king's gown, silver badges are pinned at the chest level. The master's gown is similar to the doctor's gown, but a red felt strip is replaced by the black one. For bachelors, the gown is similar to that for masters but the coloured band is replaced by yarn of the same colour.

For academics, the gown is bordered and faced with a pink felt strip decorated and arranged in a similar manner to graduates, centred with a golden yarn. Noticeably, a BA/BSc/BEcon gown for the faculty of economics and a lecturer's gown are similar in pattern; the only difference is the facing colour. Members of the university council use the same gown as lecturers, but the gold badges are used instead of silver ones.

In 2021, another gown was created for deputy vice-chancellor, assistants to the vice-chancellor, deans, directors and other executives of the university. The pattern is similar to that for members of the council but with smaller badges (about two-third of the original size).

Chancellor and chair of the university council, (Note: In Thailand, chair of the university council is the ceremonial head of the university. He/she also leads the university council/board of trustees; approves or rejects ordinances; and gives advice to the university president/vice-chancellor. Being the ceremonial head, he/she is also the chancellor of the university.) and president/vice-chancellor use the same gown as council members, but a gold chain of the specified pattern is hung between the two badges.

Gowns of similar but different patterns have been adopted by other Thai universities. For example, King Mongkut's Universities of Technology, Mae Fah Luang University, Khon Kaen University, Naresuan University, all Rajamangala Universities of Technology and some Rajabhat Universities. It is notable that almost all adaptations do not vary the colour of gown or its facing. Instead, three stripes are added to the arms or elbows of a PhD gown, just like three velvet chevrons on an American doctoral gown. As a deviation from the original traditions, two and one stripes are for master and bachelor respectively.

Following figures depict few examples of felt strips used to face and bind the academic dress used by the university.

=== Visitor ===
Visitor's robe

=== Officers ===
Members of Council's robe. This robe is also used by chancellor and president of the university.

Deputy president's robe. This robe is also worn by assistants to the president, deans and executives of the university.

Full-time lecturer's robe. Part-time lecturers may also use this gown.

=== Graduates ===
Bachelors, Faculty of Law

Masters, Faculty of Law

Doctors, Faculty of Law

Bachelors, Faculty of Commerce and Accountancy

Masters, Faculty of Commerce and Accountancy

Doctors, Faculty of Commerce and Accountancy

== Faculty colours and acronyms ==
A coloured band or yarn is stitched longitudinally to the centre of the felt strip, corresponding to the degree granting faculty. If the faculty does not have its specific colour or the degree is centrally awarded by the university (e.g. Doctor of the University), the colour shall be pink, the university colour. As an example, an MRes/MSc graduate from engineering uses firebrick, while yellow is used to denote science. Prior to 2026, the university simply used verbal descriptions for colours. As the number of disciplines grow, there are variations across robemakers and even the university departments. To solve the problem, the university recently define colours in terms of proprietary Pantone code.

The faculty colours of the university are listed below.

| Faculty | Acronym (in Thai) | Colour | Pantone |
|---|---|---|---|
| University degrees | จฬ | Pink | Multiple codes |
| Allied Health Sciences | สว | Indigo | Medium Purple C |
| Architecture | สถ | Saddle Brown | 2321 C |
| Arts | อ | Grey (Note: Original colour proposed in 1930.) | Cool Grey 7 C |
| Commerce and Accountancy (Note: The same colour is also for Sasin, whose acronym is ศศ.) | พศ | Sky blue | 299 C |
| Communication Arts | นศ | Dark blue | 288 C |
| Dentistry | ท | Amethyst | |
| Economics | ศ | Gold | 7555 C |
| Education | ค | Orange-red | 1655 C |
| Engineering | วศ | Maroon | 202 C |
| Fine and Applied Arts | ศป | Cardinal | 1795 C |
| Integrated Agriculture | ก | Turquoise (Note: Formerly vermillion.) | 3262 C |
| Law | น | White | 000 C |
| Medicine | พ | Forest green | 3500 C |
| Nursing (Note: Also for graduates from the Royal Thai Police Nursing College, which is an independent institute associated with the university. The college and the university jointly organize teaching and training. At the graduation, however, the university admitted students into appropriate degrees.) (Note: The Thai Red Cross College of Nursing lost the status of associate institute with the university in 2016, as it gained the university status.) | พย | Crimson | 200 C |
| Pharmacy | ภ | Olive drab | |
| Political Science | ร | Black | Process Black C |
| Psychology | จ | Navy blue | Blue 072 C |
| Science | วท | Lemon | 109 C |
| Sport Science | วก | Apricot | 144 C |
| Veterinary Medicine | สพ | Baby Blue | 278 C |
| College of Integrated Interdisciplinary and Integrative Studies (Note: Formerly known as the Graduate School, whose colour and acronym were cerise and บ. The Graduate School, until 2026, organized postgraduate education. The successor, College of Integrated Interdisciplinary and Integrative Studies, expand the role into non-degree courses as well as postgraduate bachelor's degree programmes.) | สบ | Blossom Pink | 699 C |
| College of Population Studies | ปก | Violet | 2665 C |
| College of Public Health Sciences | วส | Tiffany Blue | Not available |
| Petroleum and Petrochemistry College | ปป | Maize | 128 C |
| Institute of Integrated Innovation | นว | Goldenrod | 125 C |

== Academic badge ==
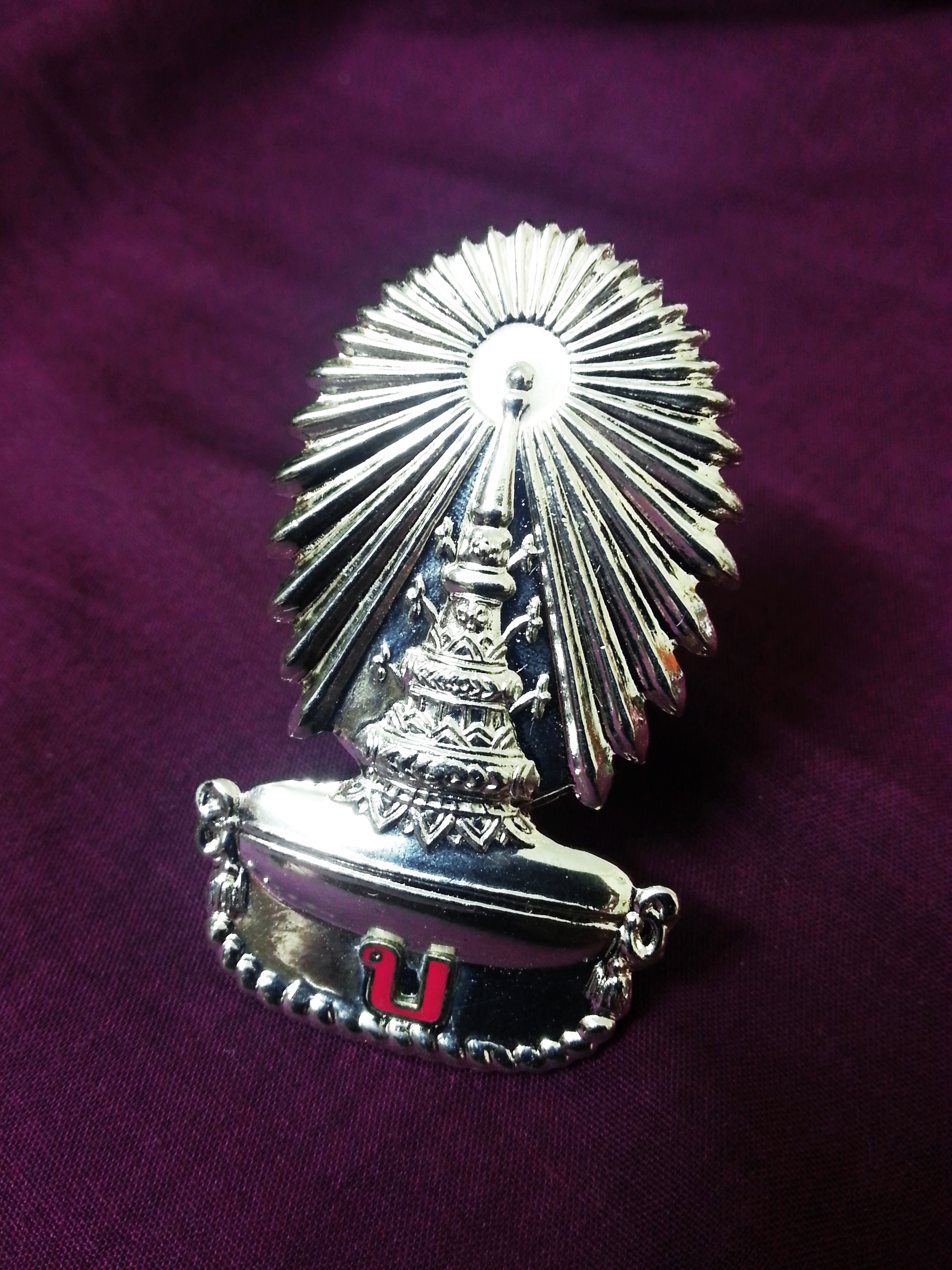
Academic badge (Graduate School)

The academic badge of the university was designed in 1914 as a silver (or chromium-plated brass) badge depicting Phra Kiao sitting on a round pillow, which is the personal emblem for Chulalongkorn and the university's emblem. The Thai acronym for the faculty is inscribed beneath the pillow. Graduate's name, programme and year of graduation may be etched on the back of the badge. Regardless of the degree level, there is only one style for a particular faculty.

All degree holders (including honorary degrees) are eligible to pin this badge on the left breast of national dress, uniform, or polite attire, preferably over the ribbon bar. For diploma graduates, the badge is switched to the right. In the past, this badge can also be worn by university employees in the performance of his/her duties.

== See also ==
- Chulalongkorn University
- Khrui
