= Raj pattern =

Thai men's costume

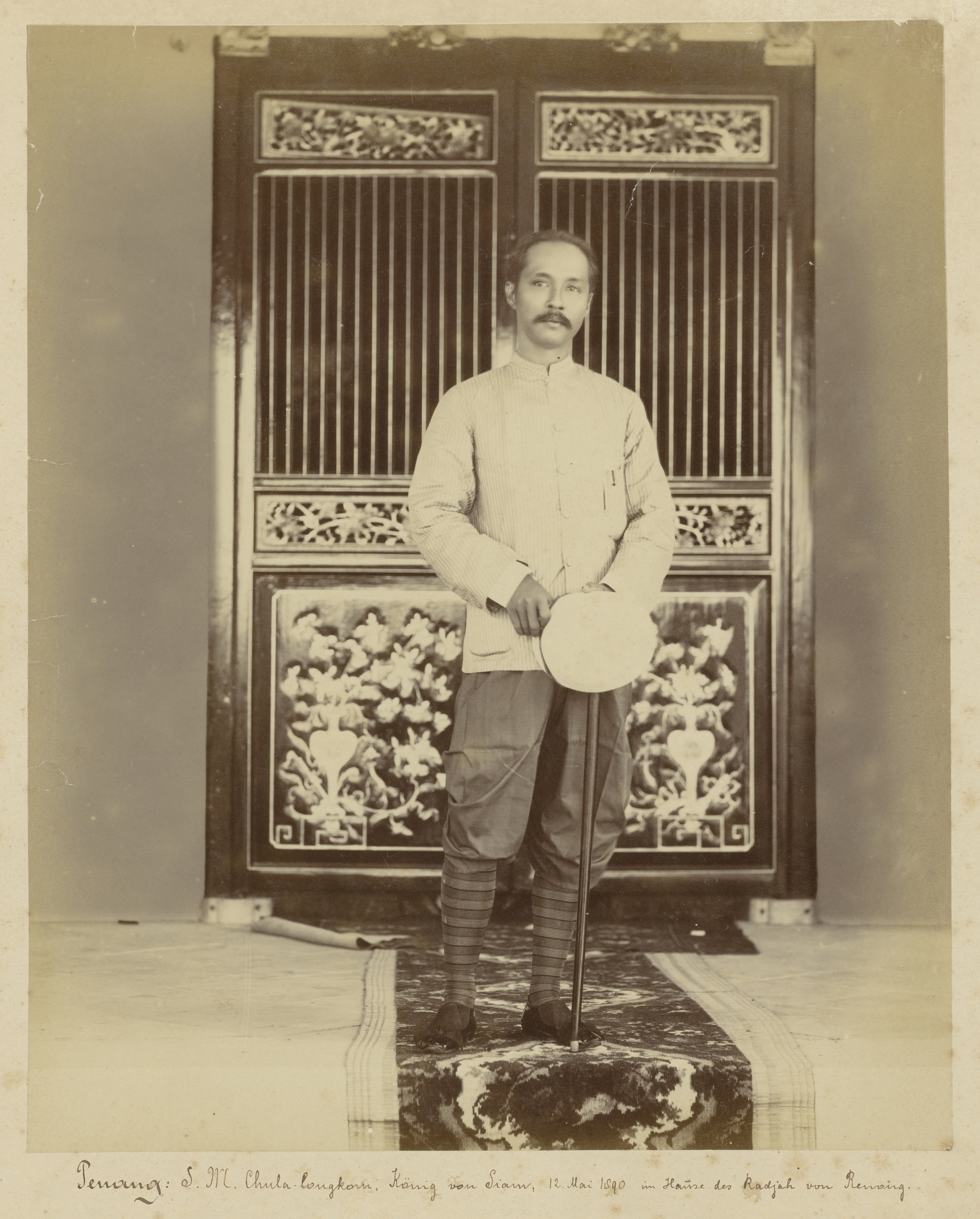
- King Chulalongkorn wears Raj pattern in 1890
- Type: National costume and dress uniform for men
- Place of origin: Thailand

Raj pattern (Thai: ราชปะแตน, RTGS: ratcha-pataen, pronounced [râːt.tɕʰā.pā.tɛ̄ːn]) refers either to a Thai men's costume consisting of a white jacket with five buttons, a chong kraben, knee-length socks and slip-on shoes, or to the specific form of the jacket itself. It was worn chiefly during the late nineteenth and early twentieth centuries by government officials and the upper class in Bangkok, and nowadays is used in select circumstances as a national costume. The symbolizes a fusion of Thai tradition and western influences during the era of modernization.

== History ==
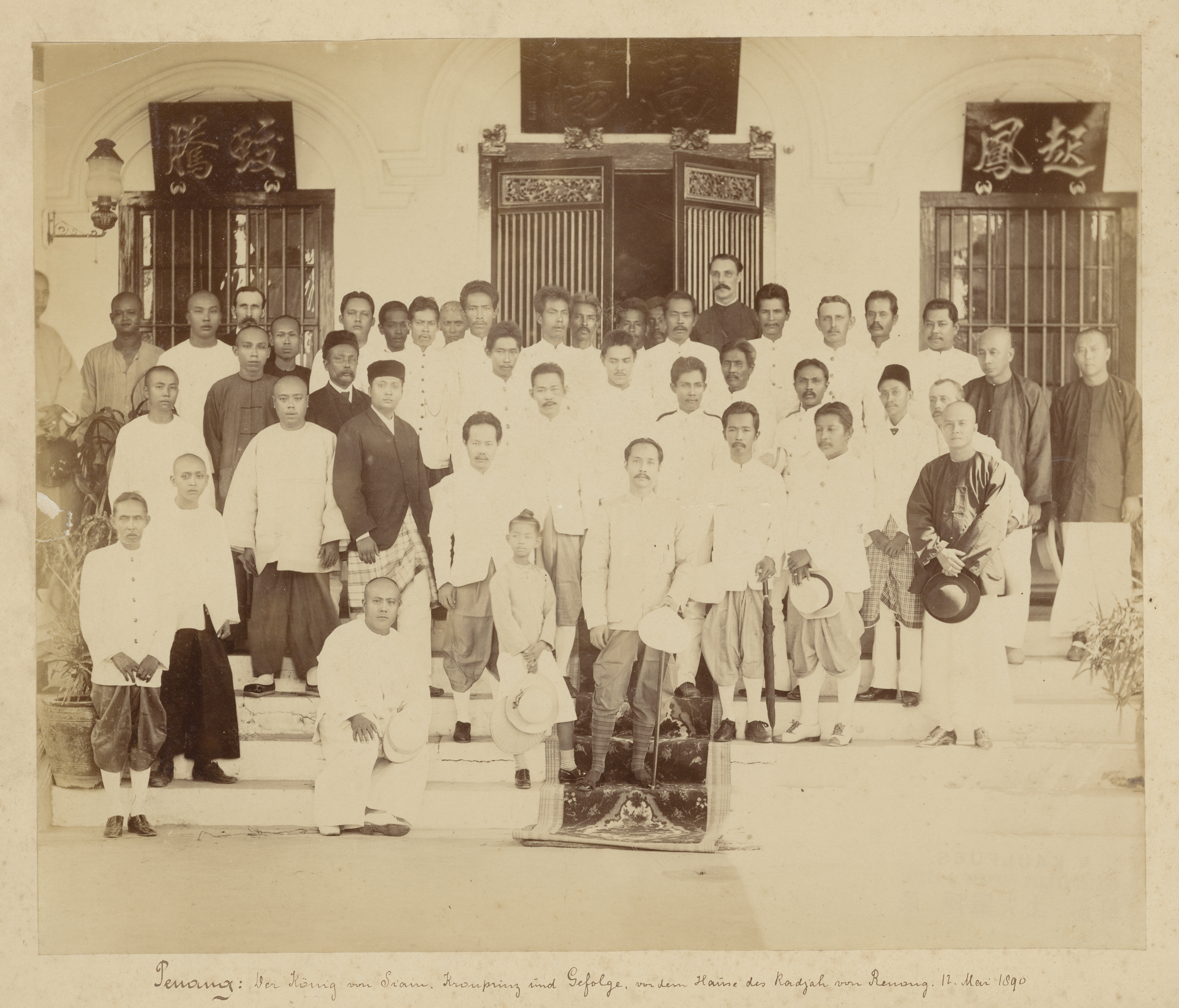
King Chulalongkorn with Prince Vajirunhis and entourage wear raj pattern in 1890

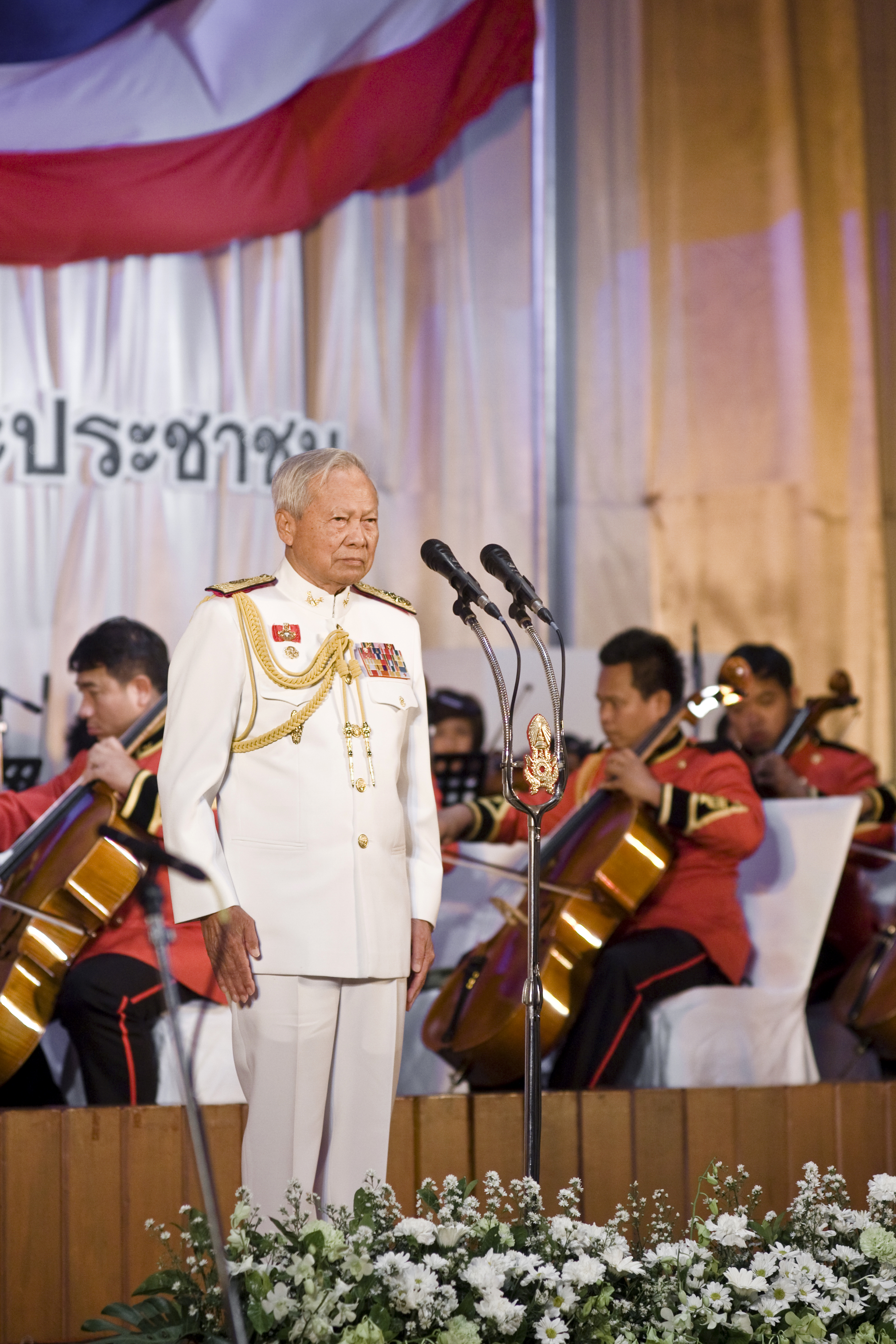
Gen. Prem Tinsulanonda wearing the raj pattern jacket as part of the white dress uniform

=== Origin ===
In 1870, the king had his entourage dressed in a combination of chong kraben (a wrap worn with part of the fabric folded back between the legs and tucked behind the waist) and Western suit jacket, socks and shoes during his visit to Singapore and Java.

The raj pattern was devised by King Chulalongkorn (Rama V) during his visit to British India in 1871, where he hired a Calcutta tailor to make a jacket with a standing collar and buttoned vertical opening. This new jacket replaced the suit jacket, alleviating the need for a separate layer of shirt in the hot climate, and the dress soon became the de facto civil uniform. It was worn both officially and privately and remained popular until the Pibulsonggram era, when the chong kraben was banned by cultural mandate. The name raj pattern, from Pali rājā and English pattern and meaning royal pattern, was coined by Phon Bunnak (later the Chao Phraya Phasakorawong), who was acting as royal secretary during the king's journey.

=== Modern ===
Nowadays, the full raj pattern costume is worn only on select occasions as a national costume, and is employed regularly only in the tourism industry. The jacket, however, has found continued use in the dress uniforms of the civil and military services, as well as the formal clothing worn with the suea khrui as the academic dress of certain universities, where it is worn with trousers in the Western style. Another Thai garment which is very similar in design is the suea phraratchathan.

== Design ==
The Raj pattern has similarities with the Nehru jacket, but specific characteristics.

=== Jacket ===
Rama V wore the original Raj pattern while on an unofficial tour of the Malay Peninsula in 1890. The tailored fit jacket features a standing collar with a vertical five-button front. The long sleeves have 2 buttons. The white round buttons are fabric cloth covered. All buttons are fastened while standing. There is 1 curved patch pocket (no flaps) on the lower left side of the chest, horizontally aligned above the left forearm. It's made of the same material as the jacket and stitched on. There are 2 curved patch pockets on the lower front of the jacket (waist height). The entire jacket has corduroy raised vertical lines. The jacket sleeve ends just before the wrist bone of the hand while standing relaxed. A dress shirt is usually not worn underneath due to the warm climate in Thailand. The shirt cuffs are covered by the sleeves in relaxed state. The jacket length is between the wrist bone and the first set of knuckles when arms are relaxed at the side.

Modern Raj pattern jackets may have 2 welt pockets on the chest and 2 on the lower front side. The fabric can be embellished with a variety of patterns and colors.

==== Pants & shoes ====
Traditionally Rama V wore chong kraben with white or bicolor horizontal striped, knee-length socks and formal black loafers. A staff member wore white Oxford shoes. Nowadays, men also wear formal trousers with dress shoes.

== Gallery ==
These are examples of men wearing raj pattern.

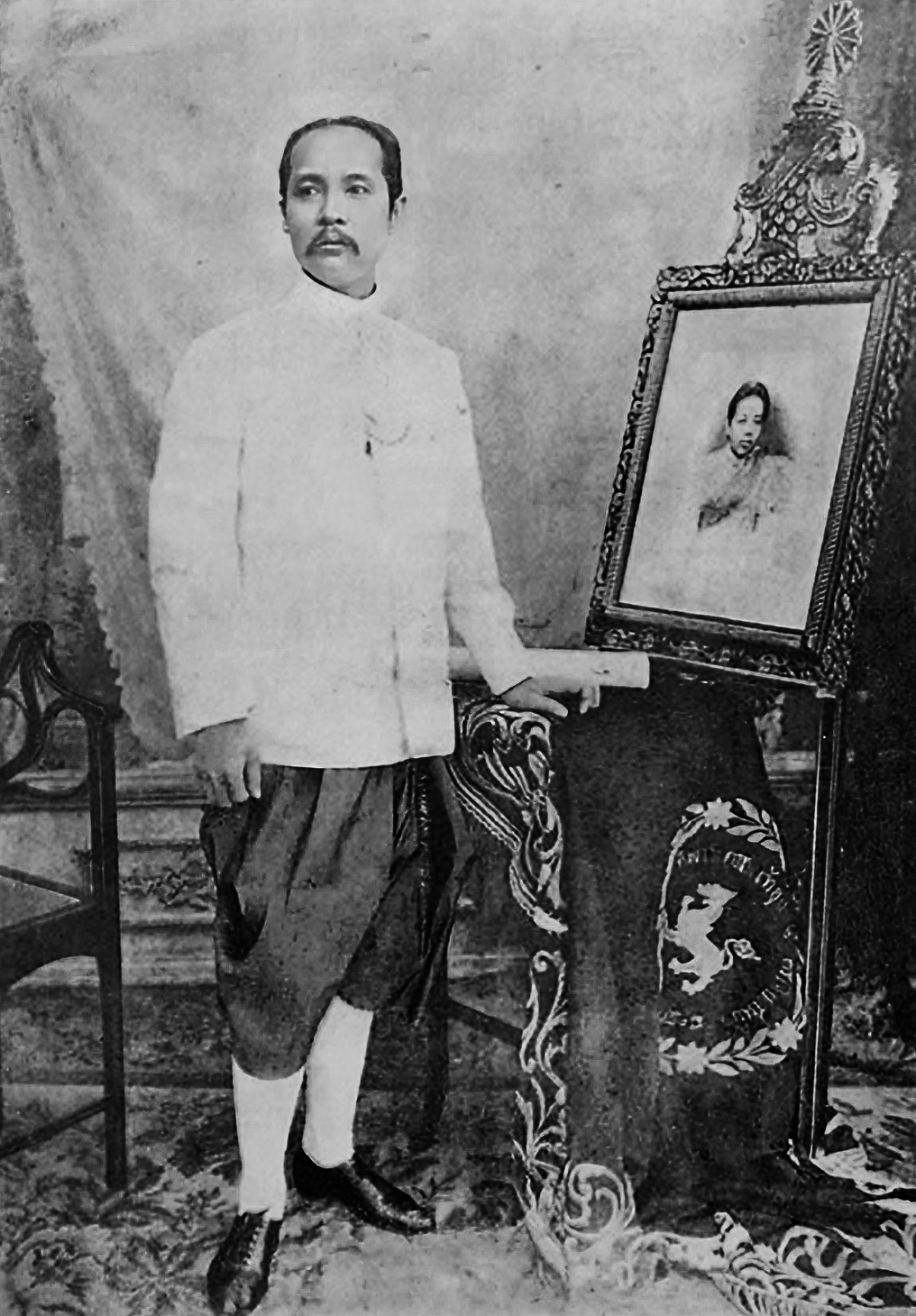

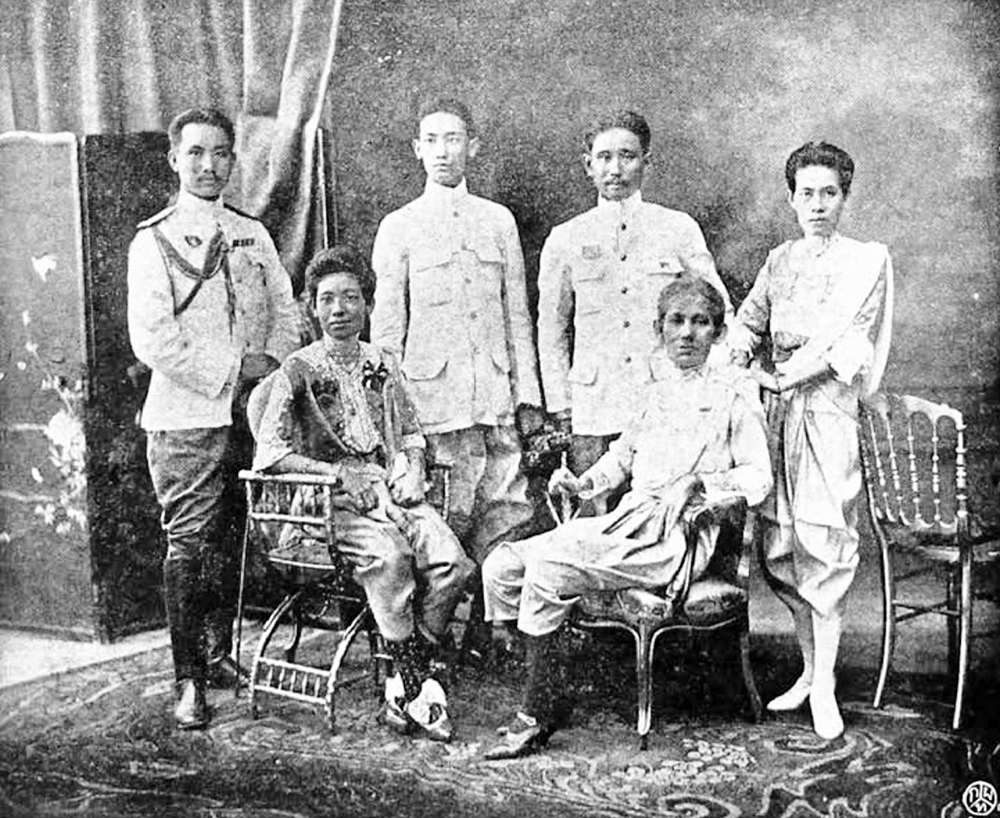

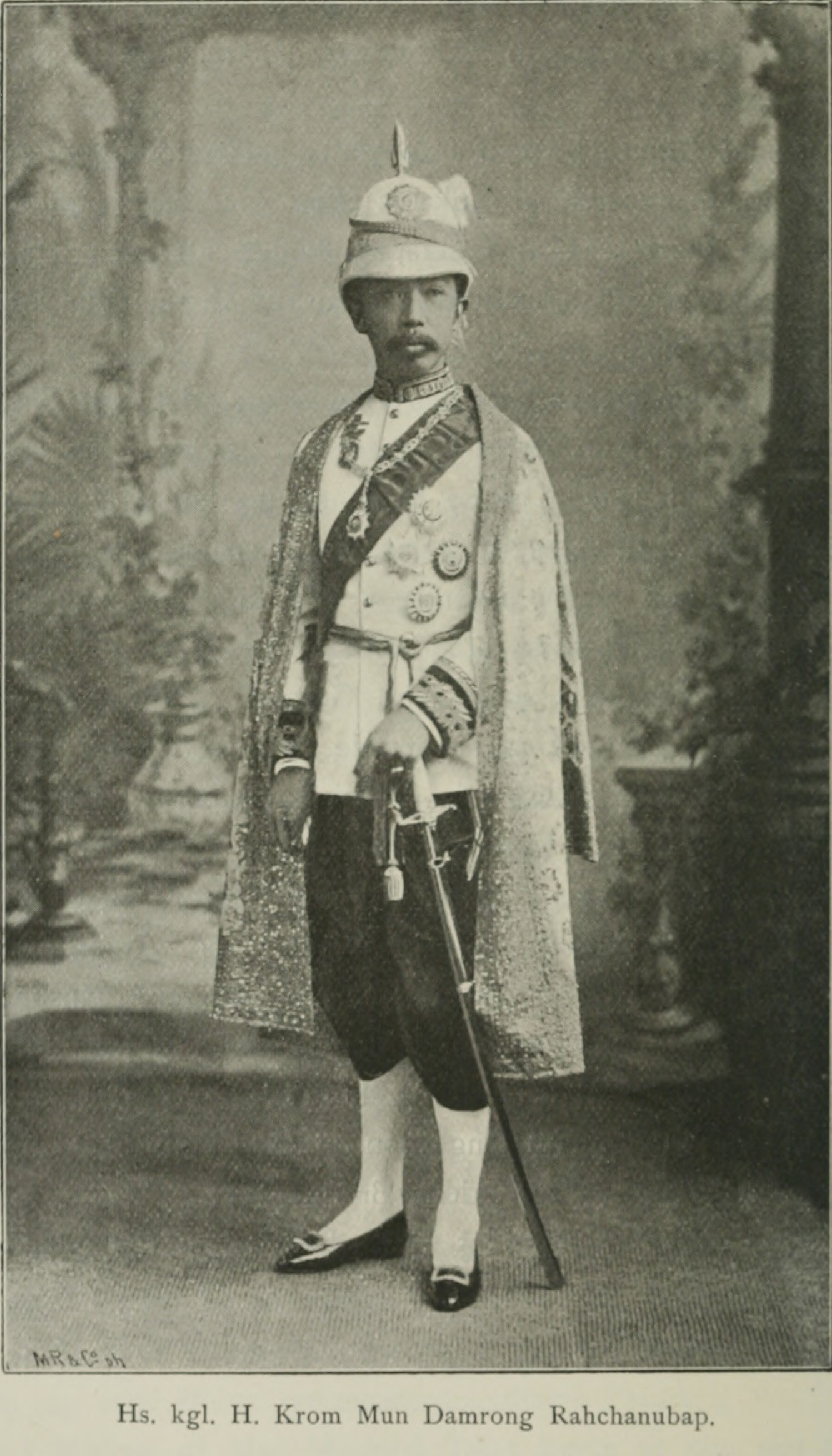

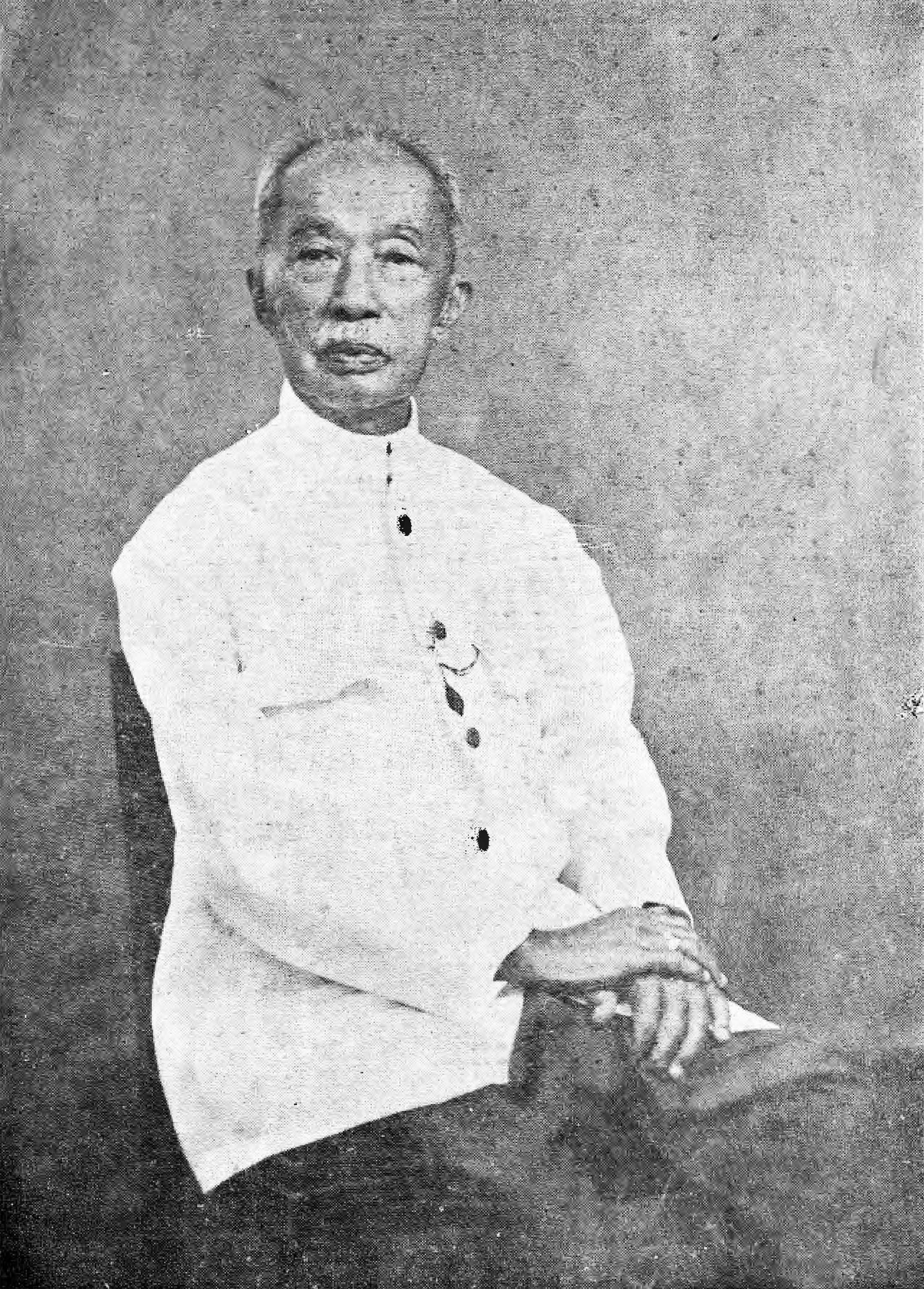

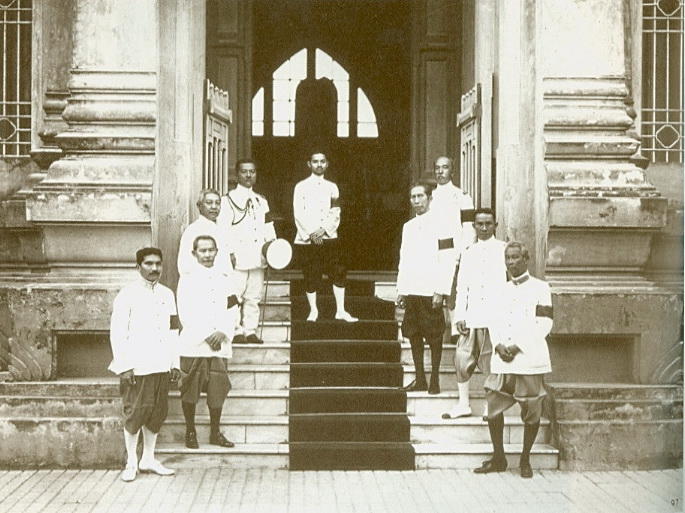
