= Royal tonsure ceremony =

A painting from ‘’The Illustrated Chronicle of the Royal History’’, image 87, depicting the reign of King Phutthayotfa Chulalok: “The Royal Tonsure Ceremony of Princess Kundol Thipphayavadi”, by Phra Wannawatwichit (Thong Charuwichit).

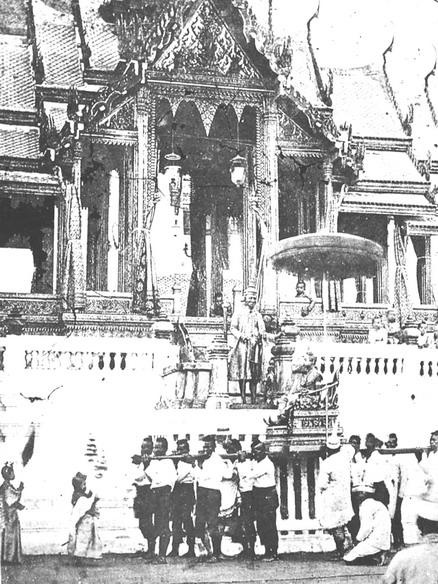
The royal tonsure ceremony of Prince Chulalongkorn in 1866

The ‘’‘Royal Tonsure Ceremony’’’ (Thai: พระราชพิธีโสกันต์, ‘‘Phra Ratcha Phithi Sokkan’’) was an important royal ceremony in Siam (present-day Thailand) and Cambodia."The Tonsure Ceremony of a Prince in Phnom Penh on 16 May 1901". Rare Books Database. It was the royal form of the traditional topknot-cutting ceremony, reserved for members of the royal family holding the rank of ‘‘Phra Ong Chao’’ (พระองค์เจ้า) or higher.Royal Institute Dictionary, 2011 edition, ISBN 978-616-7073-56-9 Junior members of the royal family underwent a ceremony known as ‘‘Kesan Kan’’ (เกศากันต์)."The Topknot-Cutting Ceremony". Intangible Cultural Heritage. Archived from the original on 2021-12-09. The two ceremonies differed in the royal attire worn by the participants, as well as in certain processional elements, which could be added or omitted according to the rank and prestige of the royal participant.

During the Rattanakosin period, the royal tonsure ceremony followed traditions inherited from the late Ayutthaya period. Princess Phinthawadi (เจ้าฟ้าพินทวดี), a daughter of King Borommakot and the only surviving royal child of the rank of Chao Fa (เจ้าฟ้า) when the Rattanakosin Kingdom was established, was familiar with court customs and traditions. Fearing that the ancient royal ceremonial practices associated with the tonsure ceremony might be lost, she recorded and compiled their details in a manual. The first royal to undergo the ceremony in accordance with the manual recorded by Princess Phinthawadi was Princess Kundol Thipphayawadi (เจ้าฟ้ากุณฑลทิพยวดี).Chotika Nunchu. "Tracing the Royal Tonsure Ceremonies of the Rattanakosin Kingdom: Who Was the First and Last Royal to Undergo the Ceremony?". Silpa Wattanatham. The royal tonsure ceremony of Princess Indurattana (พระองค์เจ้าอินทุรัตนา), held in 1931, is regarded as the last such ceremony in Thailand.

The auspicious date and time for the royal tonsure ceremony were determined by royal astrologers. The ceremony included Buddhist rites and Brahmanical rituals, which were performed concurrently. It was generally held at the Dusit Maha Prasat Throne Hall. During the early Rattanakosin period, the ceremony was often held in conjunction with the Royal Ceremony of the Fourth Lunar Month (Phra Ratcha Phithi Samphat Chinch), a traditional Thai New Year observance. Later, it was sometimes held in conjunction with the Triyampawai ceremony, also known as the Giant Swing Ceremony."Studying Royal Traditions Through the History of Court Costume". Khom Chat Luek.
