= Thai topknot-cutting ceremony =

Ancient Thai ceremony

The topknot-cutting ceremony or kon chuk (Thai: โกนจุก, pronounced [kōːn t͡ɕùk]) is an ancient Thai ceremony that used to be popular in the fourth reign. It is often held with other auspicious ceremonies such as the House Blessing Ceremony. Kon chuk is a ceremony for children who are between seven and thirteen years old.

== Custom ==
=== Before the kon chuk day ===
People have to prepare a place at a children's home or a temple and prepare items which include a table for auspicious ritual items, a table altar, scissors, holy thread, holy water, conch shell, and food for monks. Buddhist monks are invited to the ceremony.

=== On the kon chuk day ===
The child must be dressed in new and beautiful clothes. Then parents of the child take the child to the place where they are prepared for the kon chuk ceremony, and the monks will start chanting Chayanto, which is a Thai prayer. When the chanting is finished, a monk cuts a bit of the child's hair, and then adults who could be mother, father, or a person who the child highly respects can continue to cut the child's hair. Next, parents of the child take the child to a place where is prepared for pouring holy water. Then adults start pouring holy water on the child from the most respected person to the less respected person. The child's hair that was cut is put on a lotus leaf that is floated on the water, and the adults will pray for the child.
