= Lomphok =

Thai ceremonial headgear

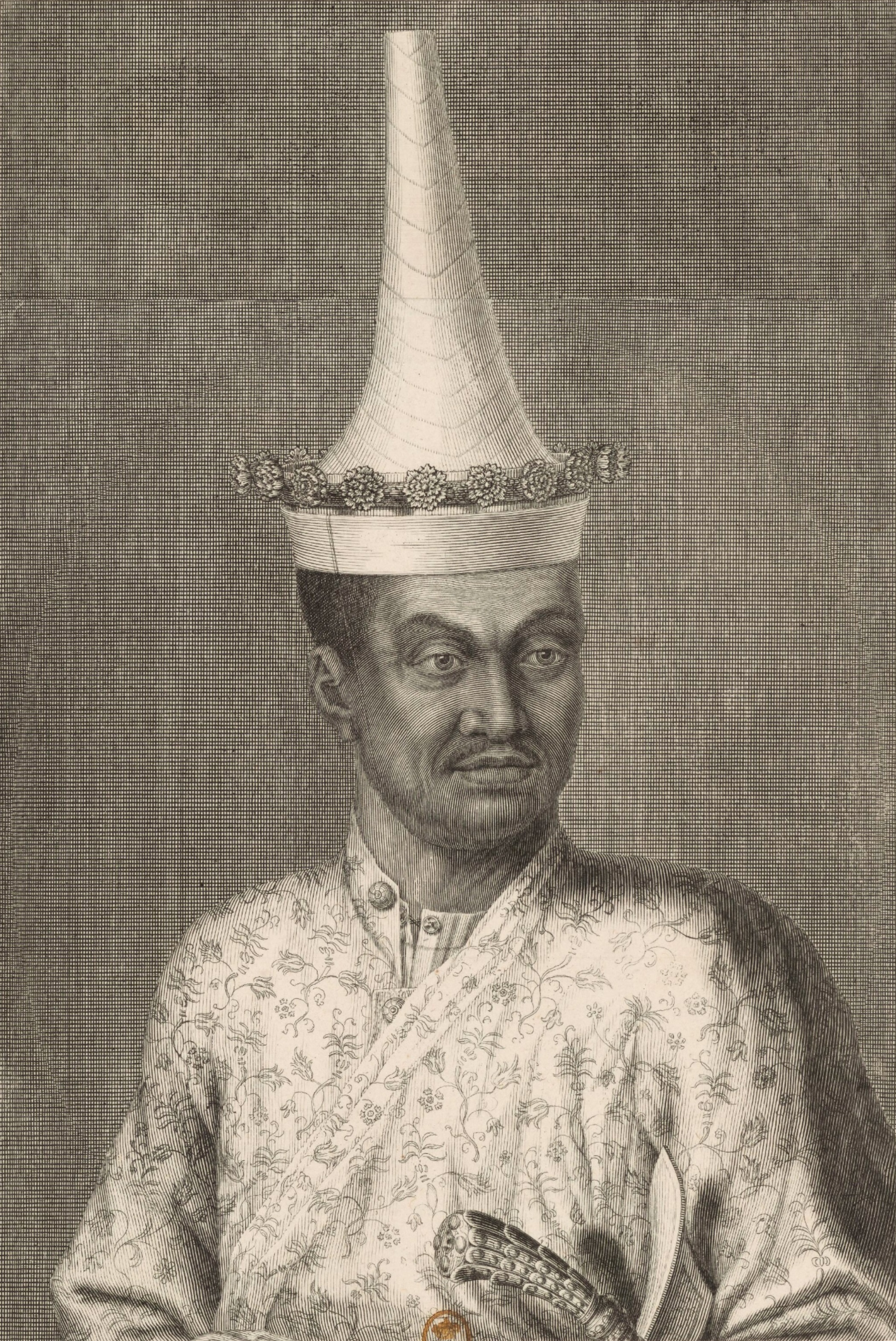
The Ayutthayan ambassador Kosa Pan wearing the lomphok (1686)

The lomphok (Thai: ลอมพอก, pronounced [lɔ̄m.pʰɔ̂ːk]; literally, "piled up [and] layered [wrapped head cover]") is a ceremonial headgear of Thailand, historically worn by royalty and nobility. It is a tall pointed hat, made of white cloth wrapped around a bamboo frame. The lomphok is believed to have been adapted from the turbans of Safavid-dynasty Persia during the Ayutthaya period, and its use is extensively documented by European writers who came into contact with Siam during the reign of King Narai. In particular, its use by Kosa Pan and the other diplomats of the embassy to the court of Louis XIV in 1686 became a sensation in French society. Today, the lomphok can be seen worn by officials in the Royal Ploughing Ceremony and royal funeral processions.

== Gallery ==
These are examples of Siamese people wearing lomphok during different social and ceremonial occasions throughout Thai history.

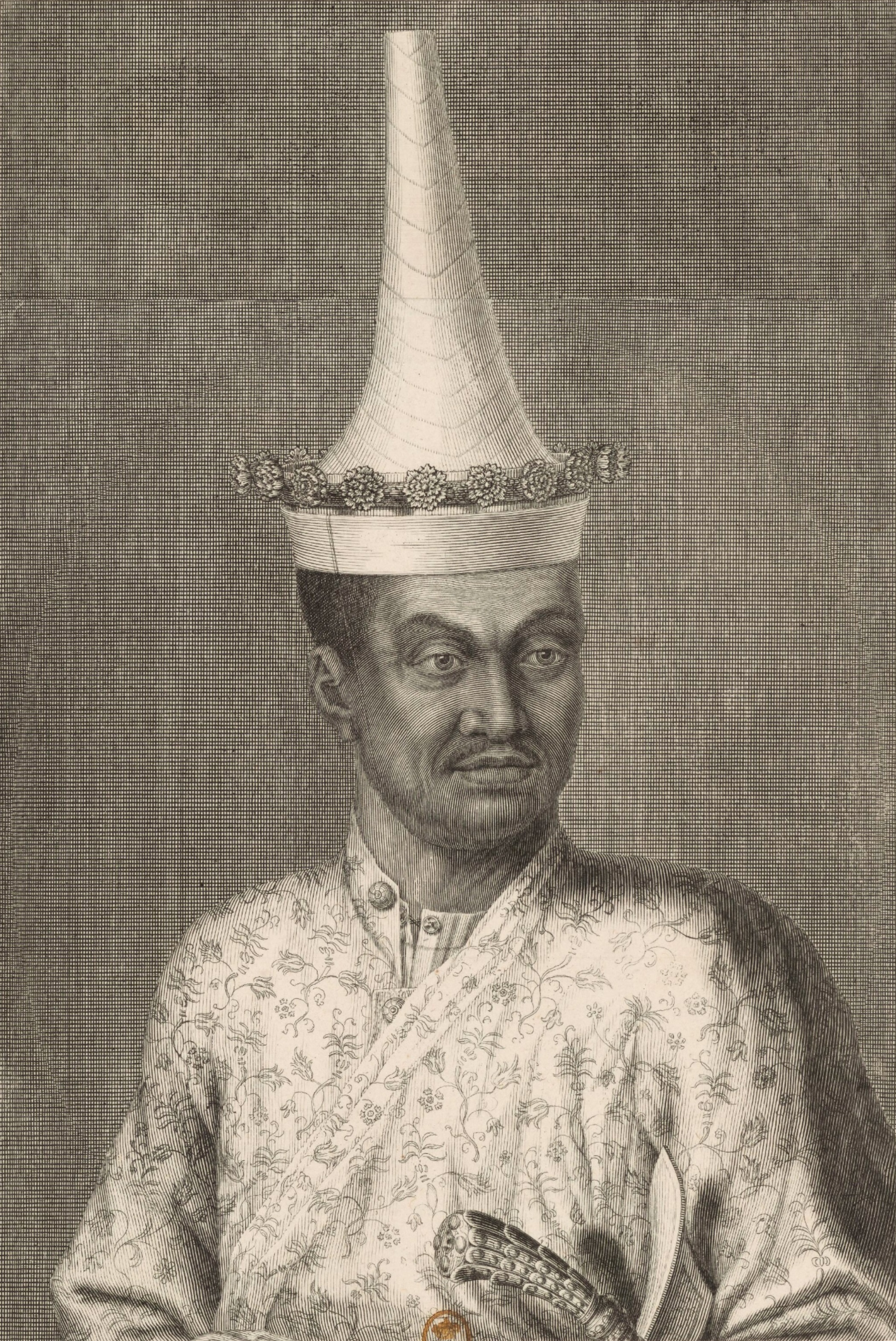
Kosa Pan Ambassador of Siam Portrait 1686

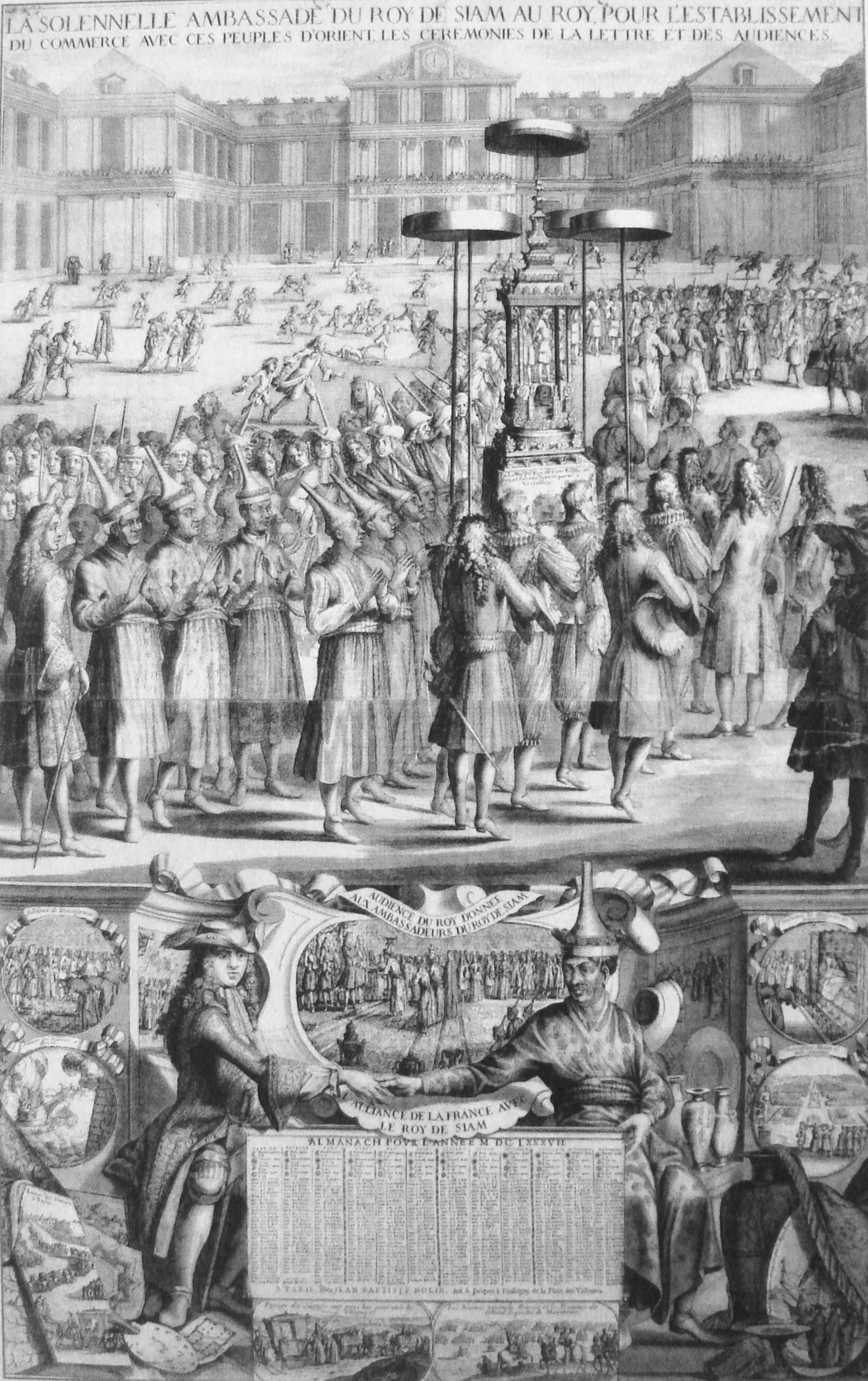
Almanch 1687

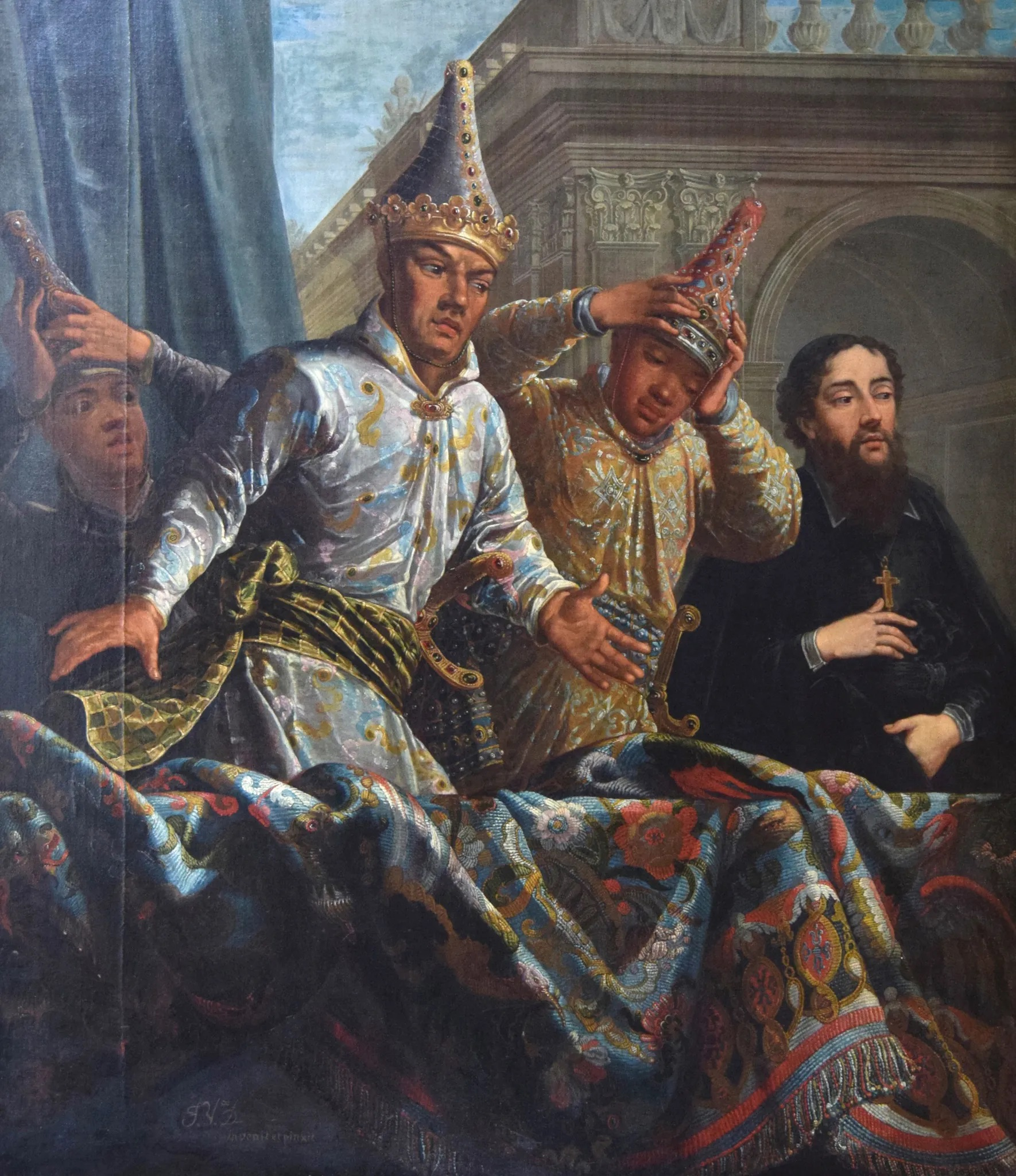
Siamese Ambassadors and Artus de Lionne 1686 by Jacques Duplessis

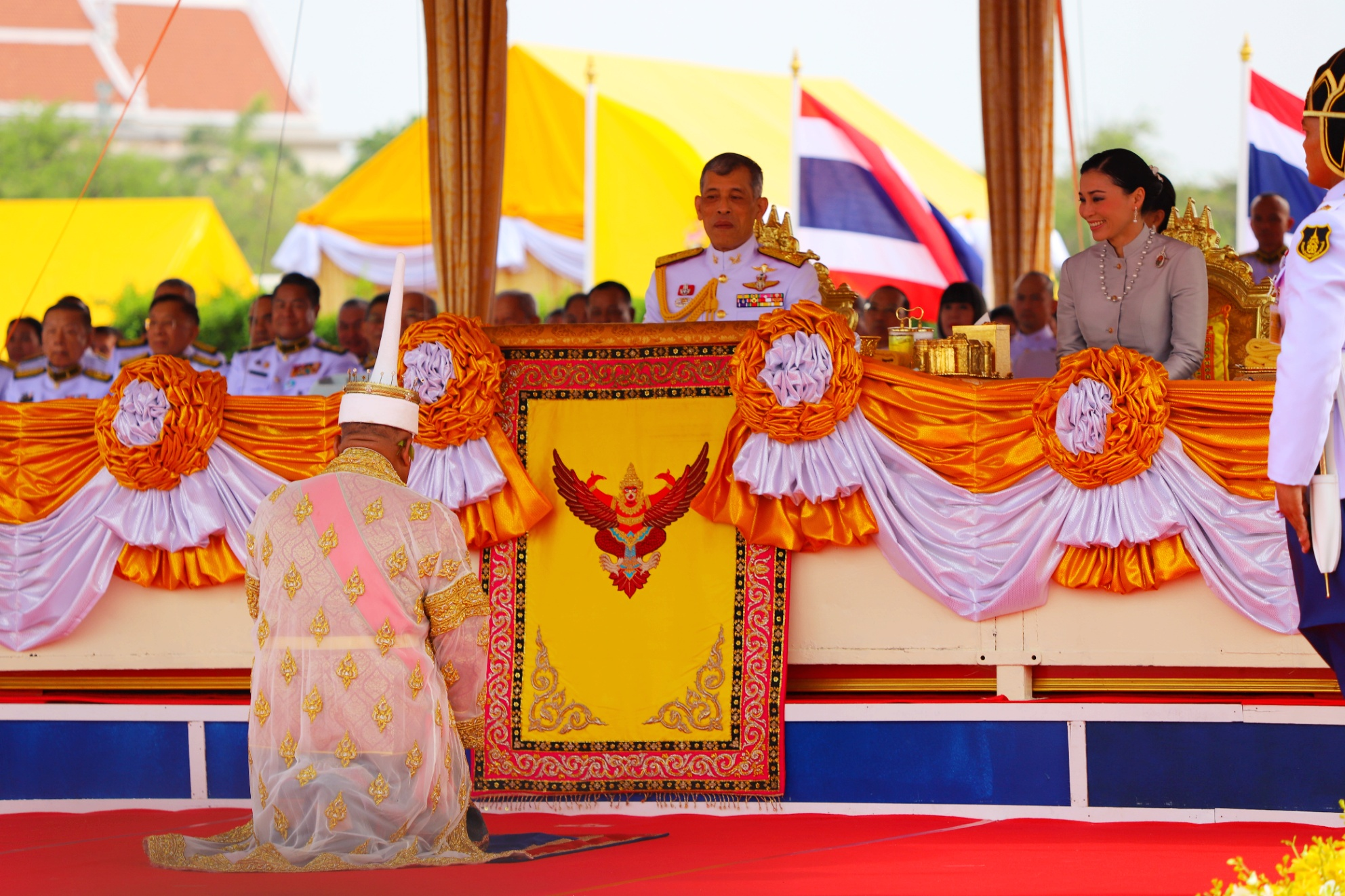
Royal ploughing ceremony day 10

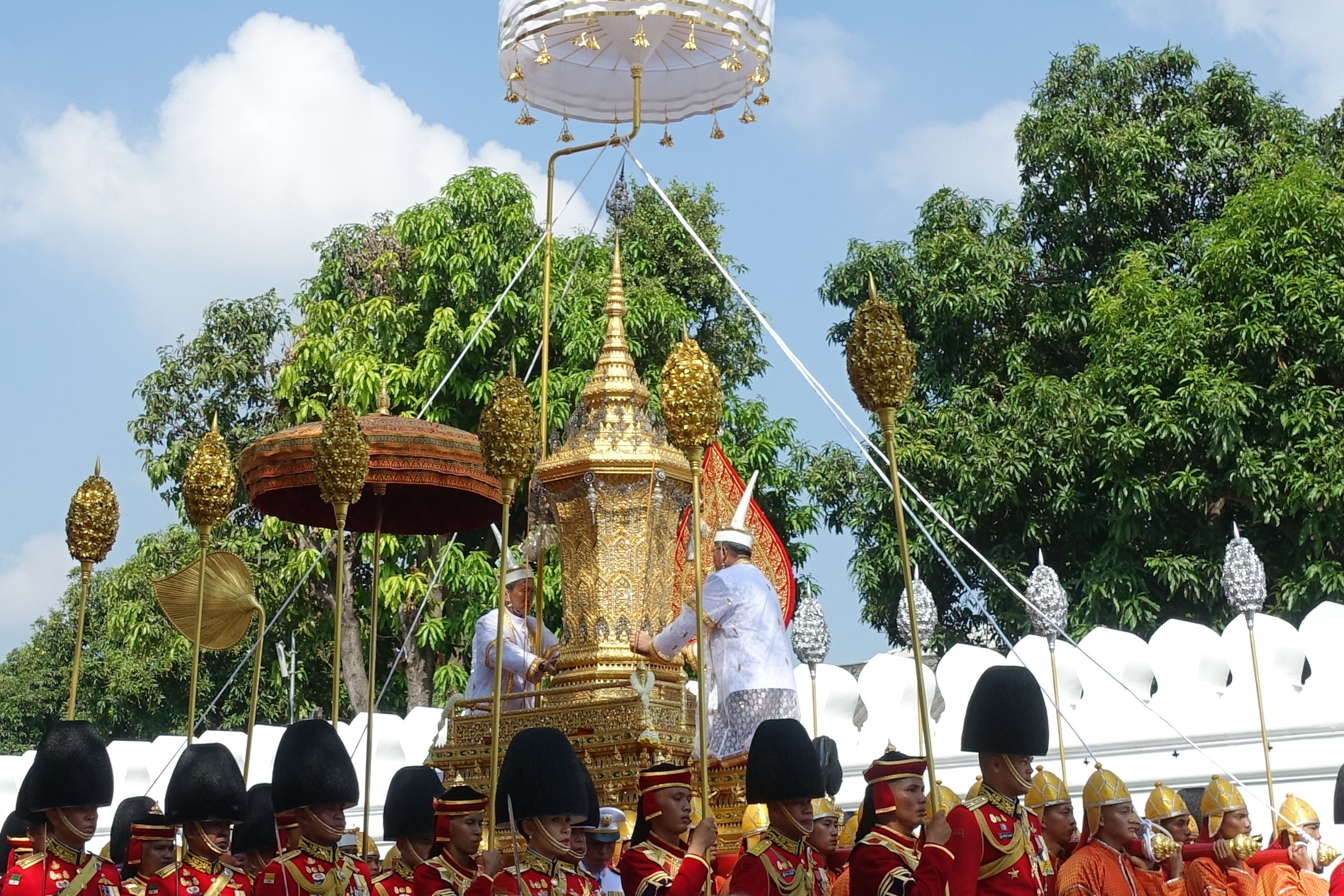
Funeral officials wearing lomphok escorting the royal urn during the funeral of Bhumibol Adulyadej

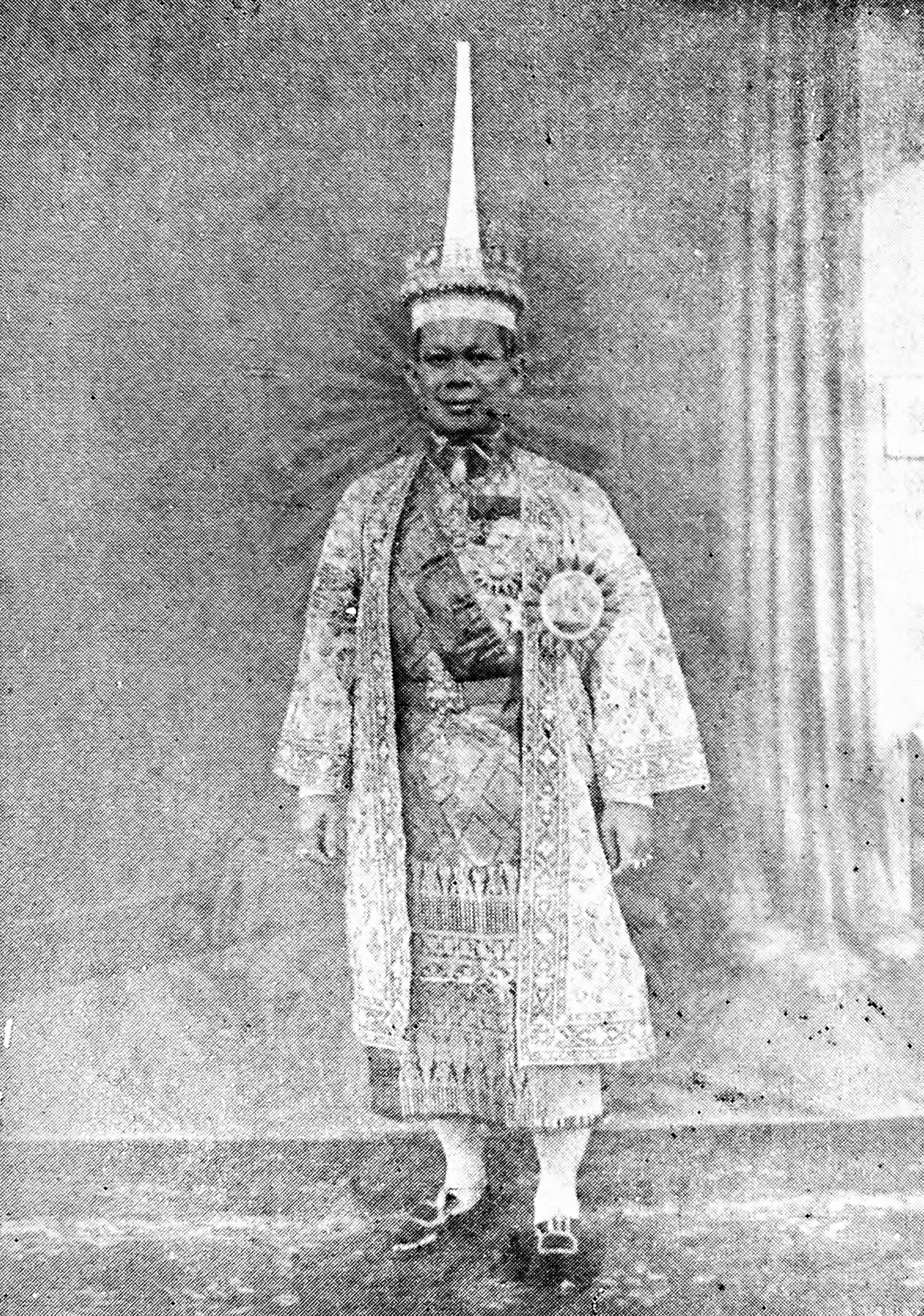
Lek Panikkabut

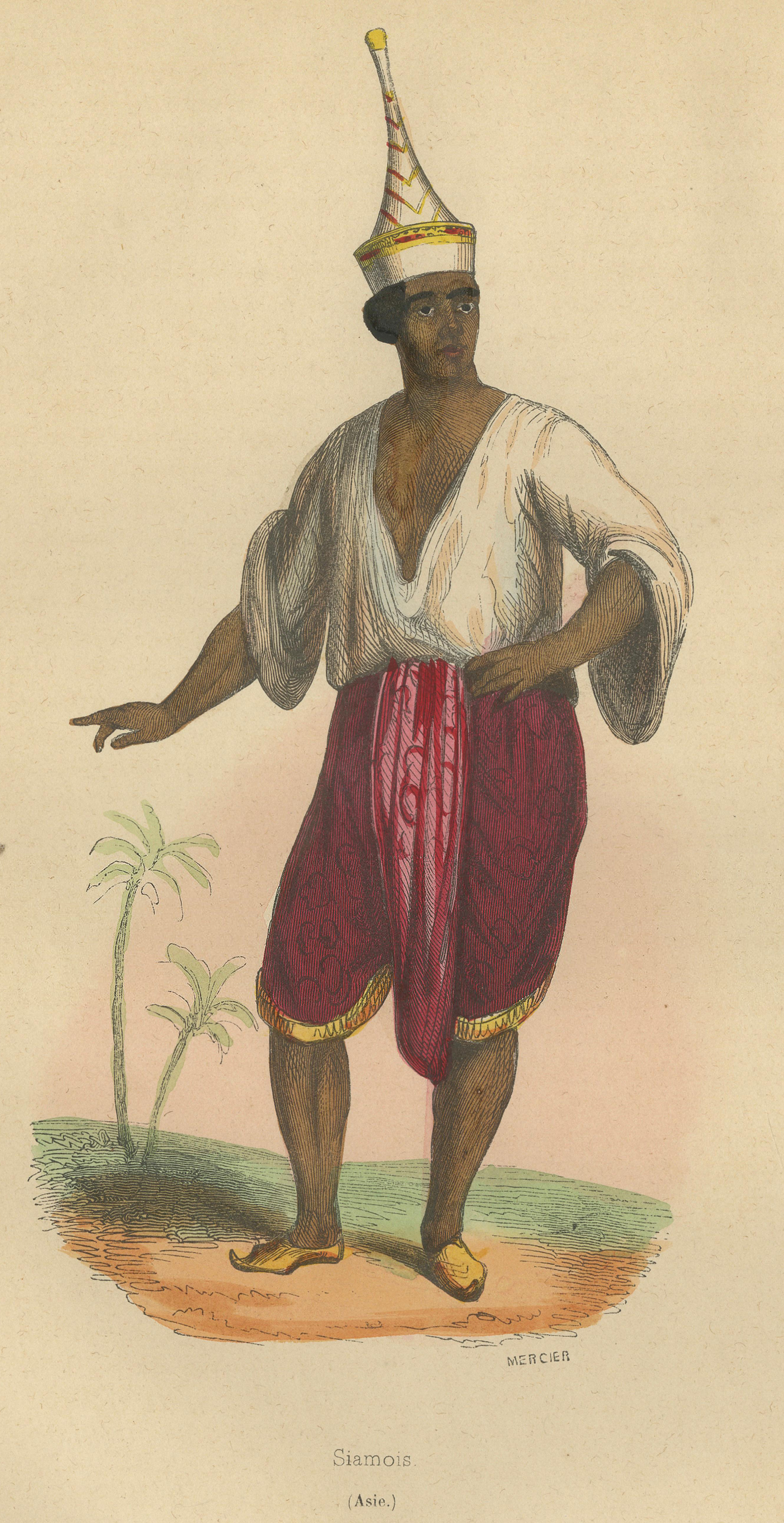
Siamese Man in Traditional Attire by Mercier 1845
