= Formal Thai national costume =

The formal Thai national costume, known in Thai as ชุดไทยพระราชนิยม (RTGS: chud thai phra ratcha niyom, literally 'Thai dress of royal endorsement'), includes several sets of clothing, or chud thai, designed for use as national costume. Although described and intended for use as national costume, they were shaped through a process of historical research and refinement under Queen Sirikit’s patronage, blending traditional Thai design with contemporary tailoring for formal occasions.

== International Recognition ==
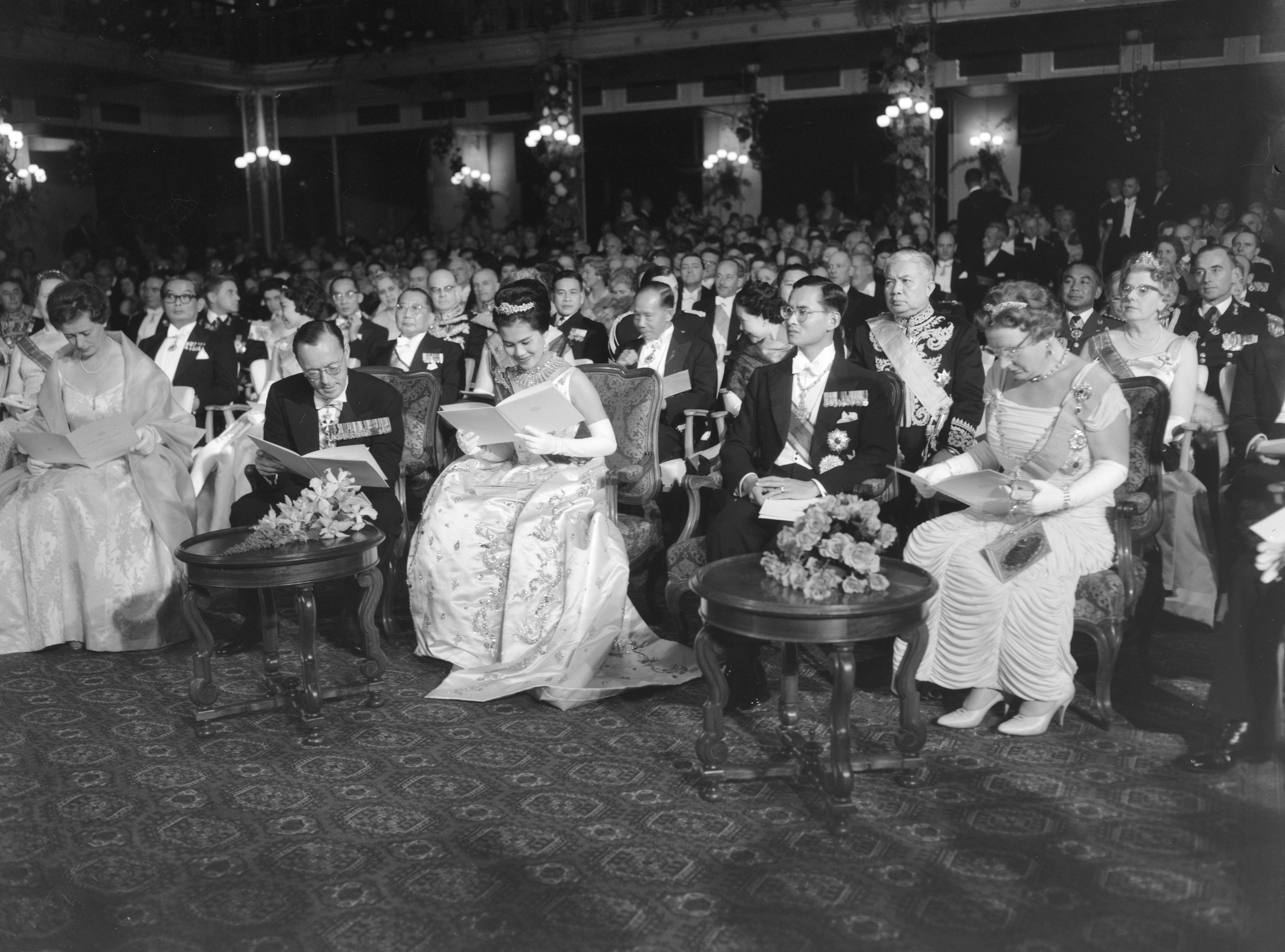
Queen Sirikit and King Bhumibol with Queen Juliana and Prince Bernhard during the Thai royal visit to the Netherlands in 1960.

International media coverage of Sirikit's overseas tours in the 1960s frequently noted her clothing and style. Time reported in 1962 that she was again placed on the world's best-dressed women list. Vanity Fair later listed her in the International Best Dressed Hall of Fame List (1965). In 2025, Town & Country described her as a glamorous fashion icon of the 1950s and 1960s and noted her frequent appearances on international best-dressed lists. She collaborated with French couturier Pierre Balmain on outfits made from Thai silk, adding that her promotion of traditional weaving was credited with supporting Thailand's silk industry.

== History ==
The formal Thai national costume is inspired by the Thai royal attire originates from the Sukhothai Kingdom and later the Ayutthaya Kingdom. It's a distinct style with influences from India, Dvaravati Kingdom and China. Silk was brought to Siam via trade routes. The Pha Nung is a foundational garment. It has intricate weaving and embroidery which indicates the wearer's status. During the Ayutthaya era the royal attire became more elaborate and ceremonial. There were strict dress codes for various occasions with specific designs and accessories. The clothing was often made from gold- and silver-threaded fabrics. The Chong Kraben was worn with embroidered jackets. Women's outfits have more intricate patterns often with golden belts, brooches and necklaces to reflect the prosperity and sophistication of the Ayutthaya Court.

The Rattanakosin era royal fashion was further refined to distinguish from casual attire. Men's attire became more structured, influenced by Western tailoring techniques which were brought by European visitors. The Chong Khraben was styled and paired with fitted jackets and shirts. Royal garments for women became more lavish with yok dok fabrics, floral motifs, and ornate pha biang shoulder cloths. Crowns, earrings, and golden bracelets enhanced the regal appearance. Queen Sirikit worked closely with artistans to revive Thai royal attire and preserve Thai cultural heritage by recreating historical designs and adept them for modern use. They created the Chut Thai Phra Ratchaniyom (Thai: ชุดไทยพระราชนิยม), a collection of eight official Thai clothing styles. These are for various occasions such as royal ceremonies and galas. The most iconic styles are the Chut Thai Chakkraphat, a majestic outfit inspired by ancient royal attire, and the Chut Thai Siwalai, a sophisticated ensemble for formal events.

The fabrics are often woven by hand with traditional weaving and embroidery techniques. The weaving and embroidery techniques are preserved. The patterns are for example mythical creatures, lotus flowers, geometrical shapes each carrying its own symbolism and spirituality. Hues have auspicious qualities. Gold and silver threads are commonly used to highlight the grandeur of the garments, while jewelry such as crowns, belts, and necklaces add a finishing touch of regality.

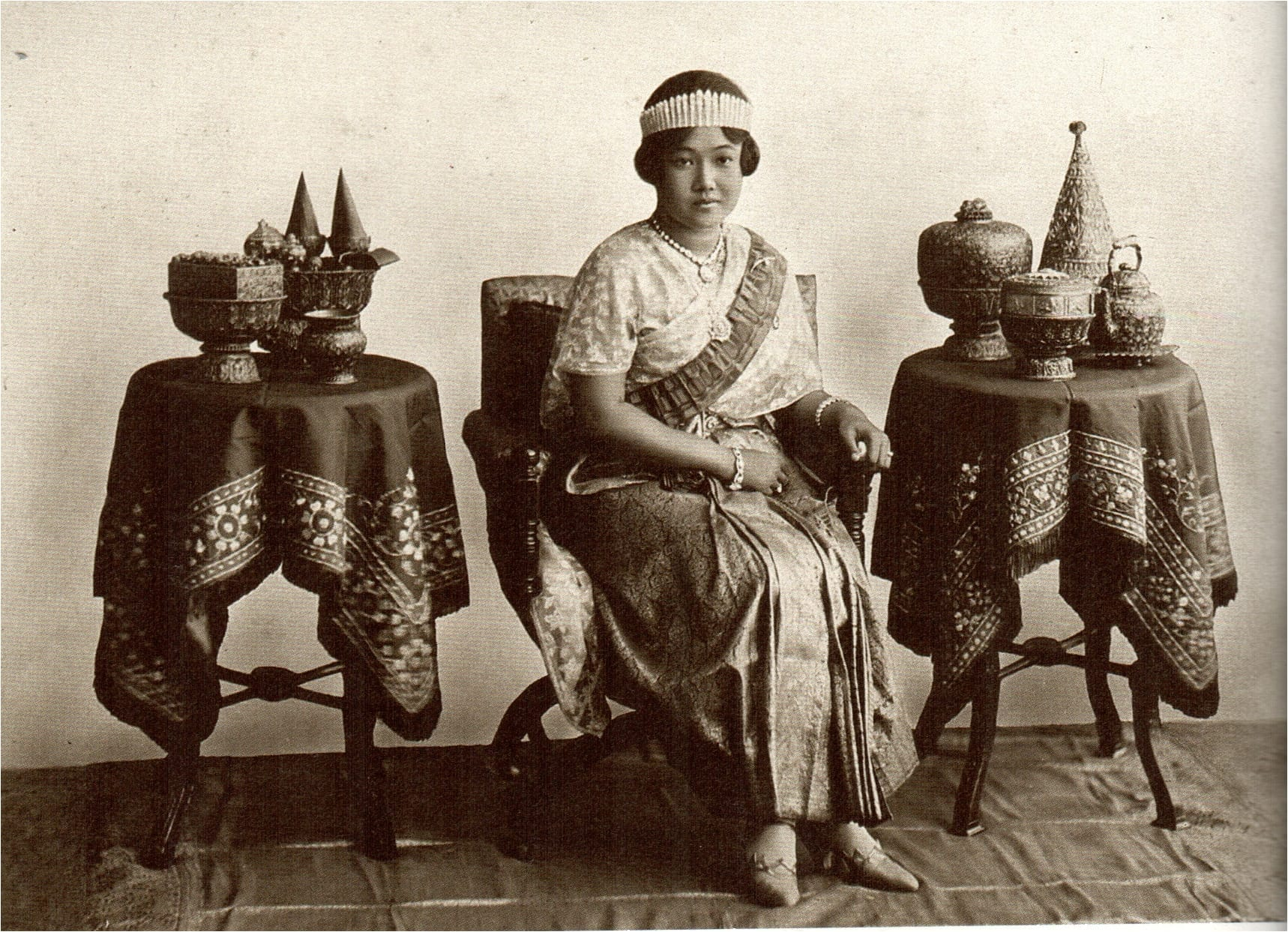
The coronation of Queen Rambai Barni of Siam, 1925

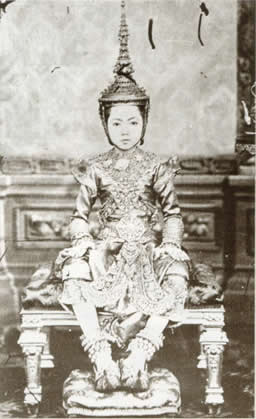
Princess Voralaksanavadi in full regalia on her tonsurate ceremony, 1880

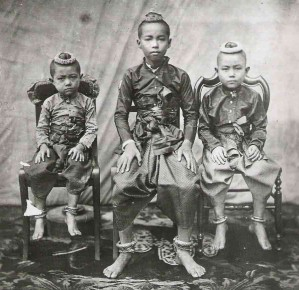
Photograph of Prince Chulalongkorn (King Rama V) and his two younger brothers wearing chong kraben, 1851

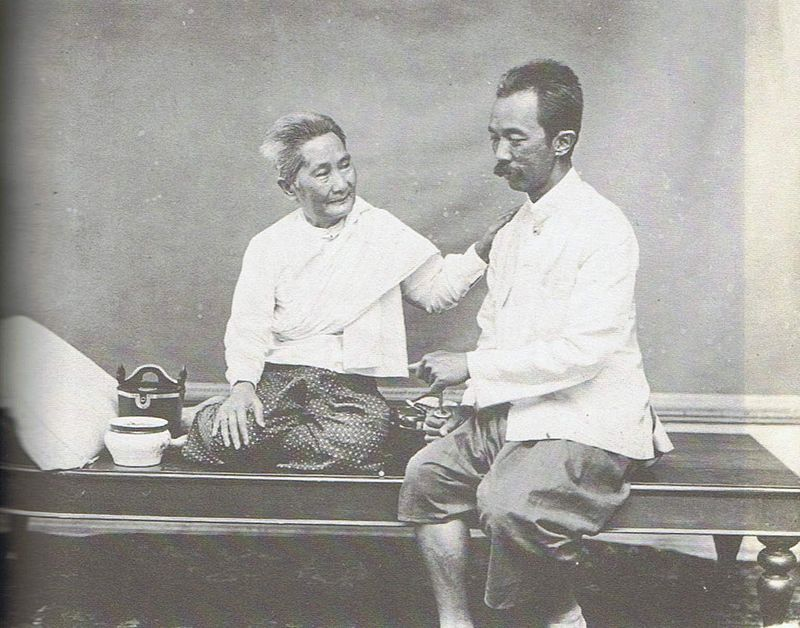
Prince Damrong Rajanubhab wearing raj pattern and his mother wearing pha nung and pha biang, 1912

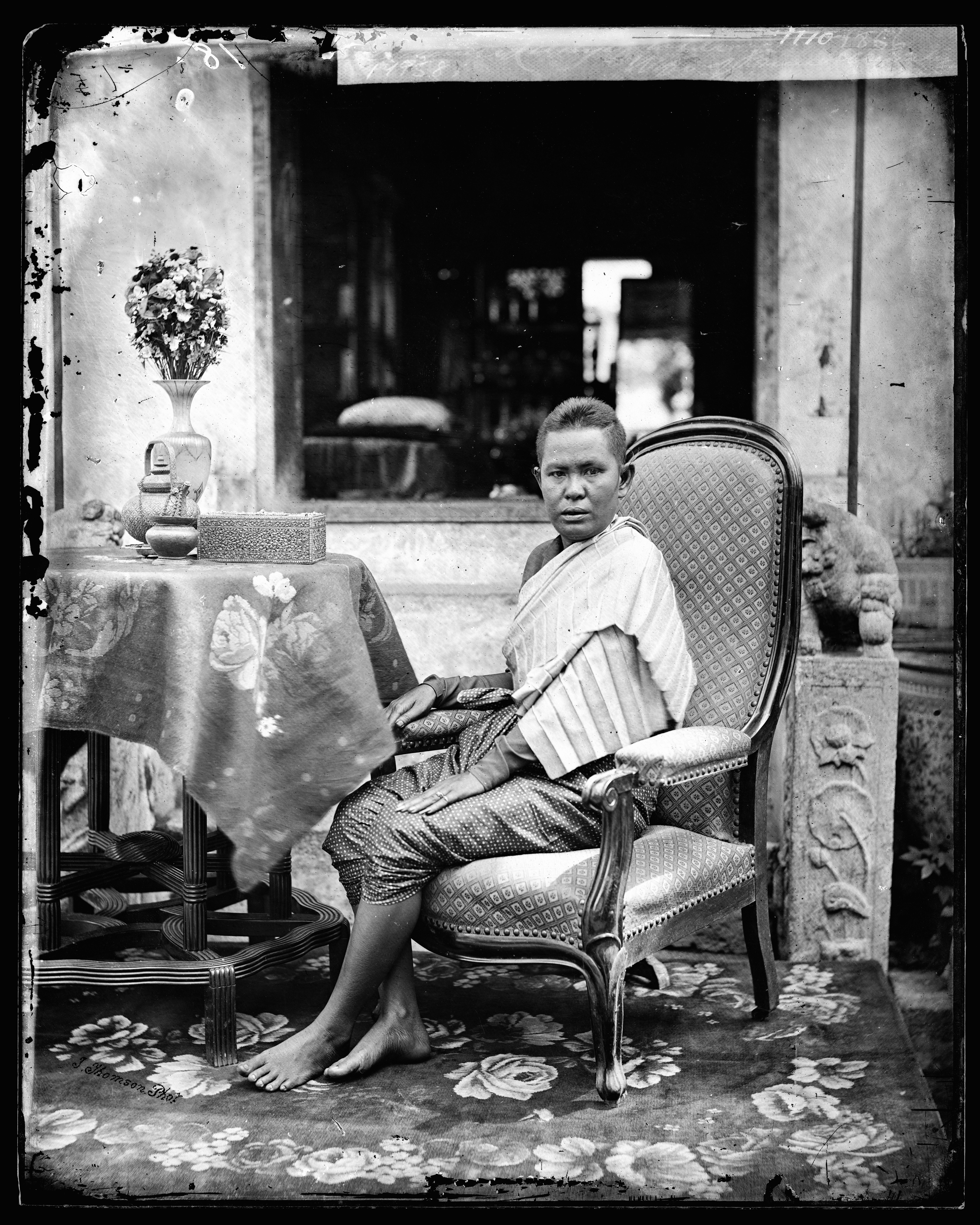
Lady Pun Bunnag, Somdet Chaophraya Borom Maha Sri Suriwongse's wife wearing pha biang, 1866

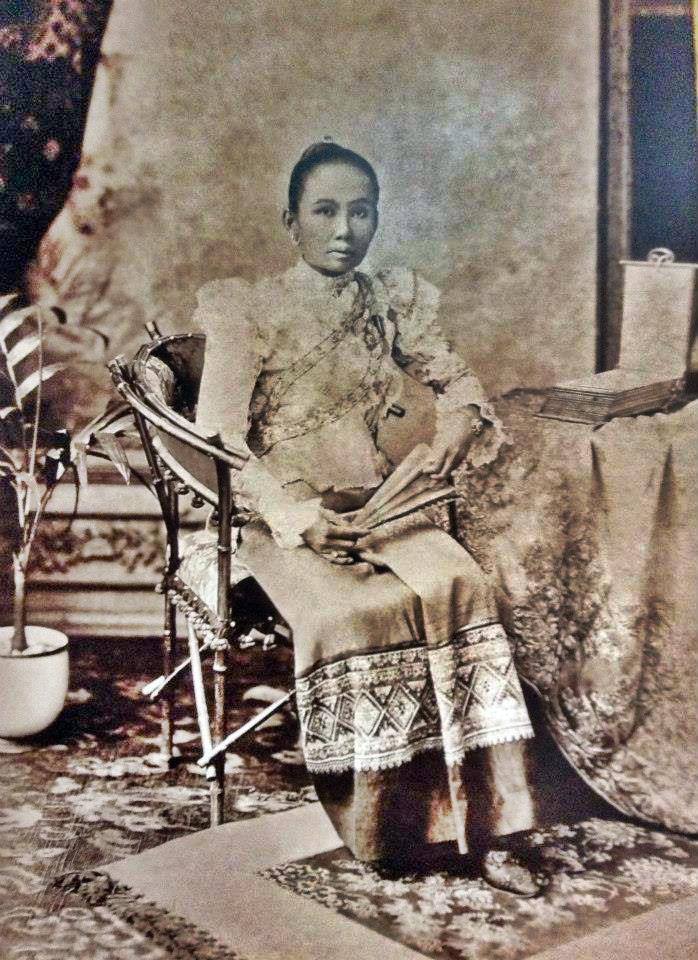
Bualai, was a Princess Consort of Phiriya Thepphawong of Phrae wearing ham sleeve blouses and pha sin, before 1902

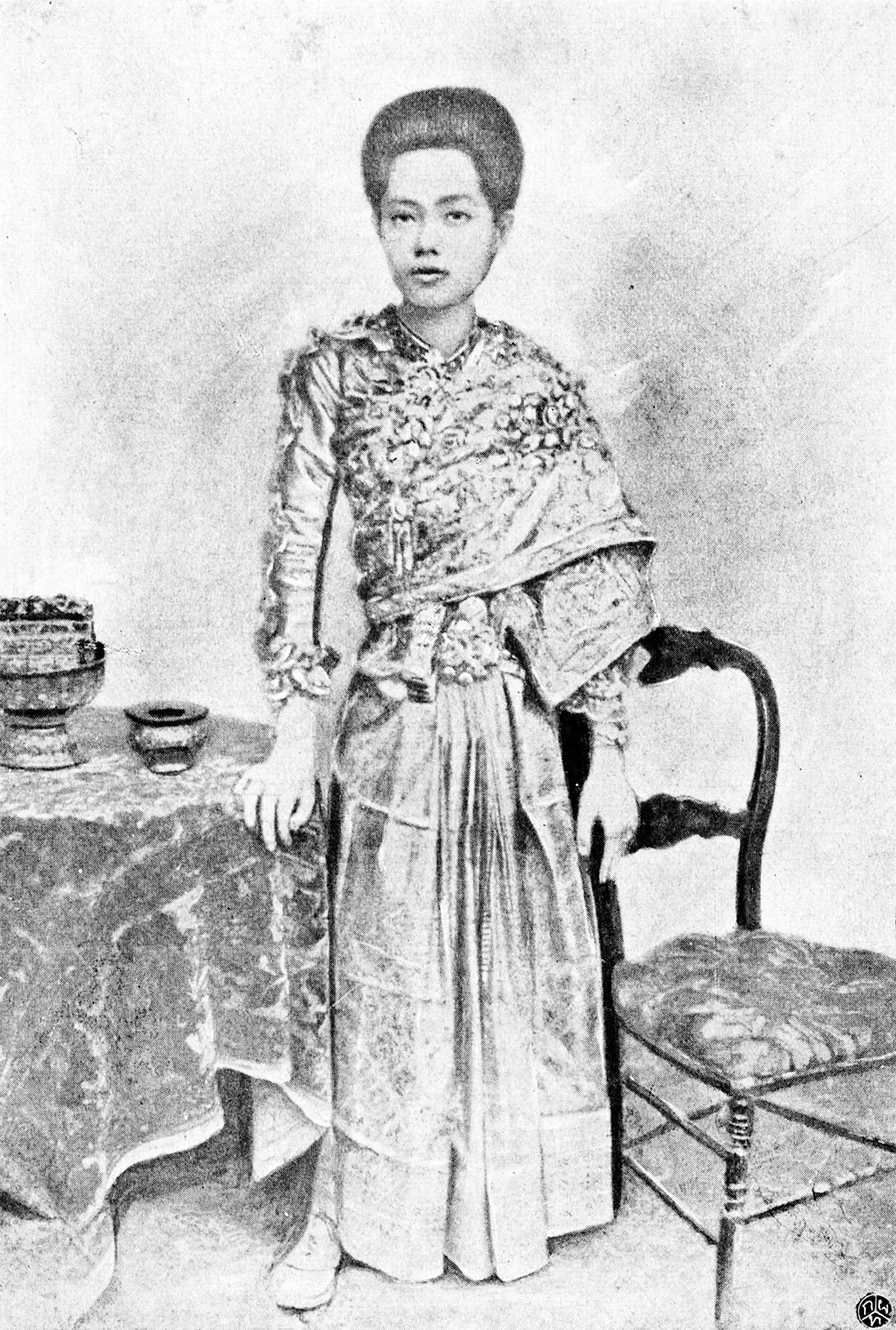
Princess Voralaksanavadi, a daughter of King Chulalongkorn (Rama V) wearing pha nung and pha biang, 1926

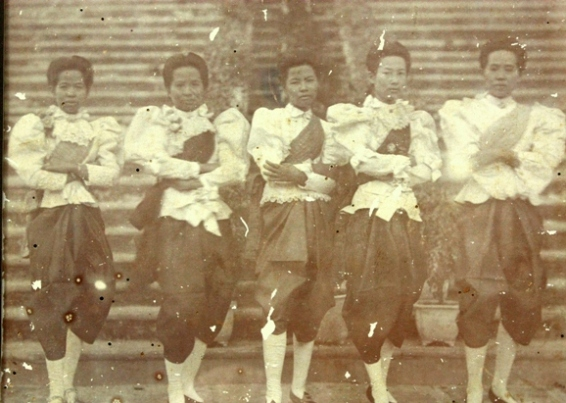
Thai princess of the Inner Court of the Grand Palacein Bangkok, 1890

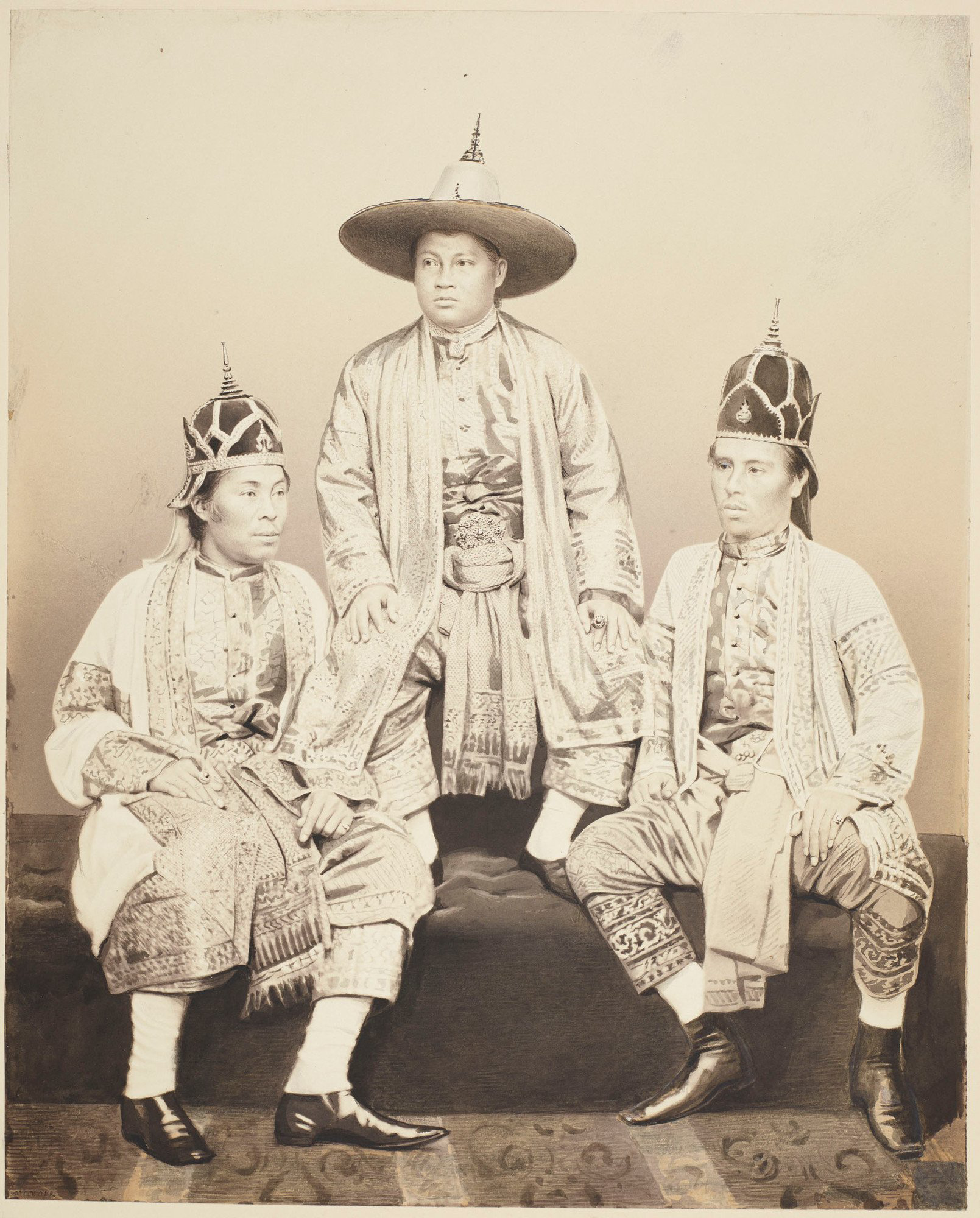
Siamese Ambassadors in England, 1857

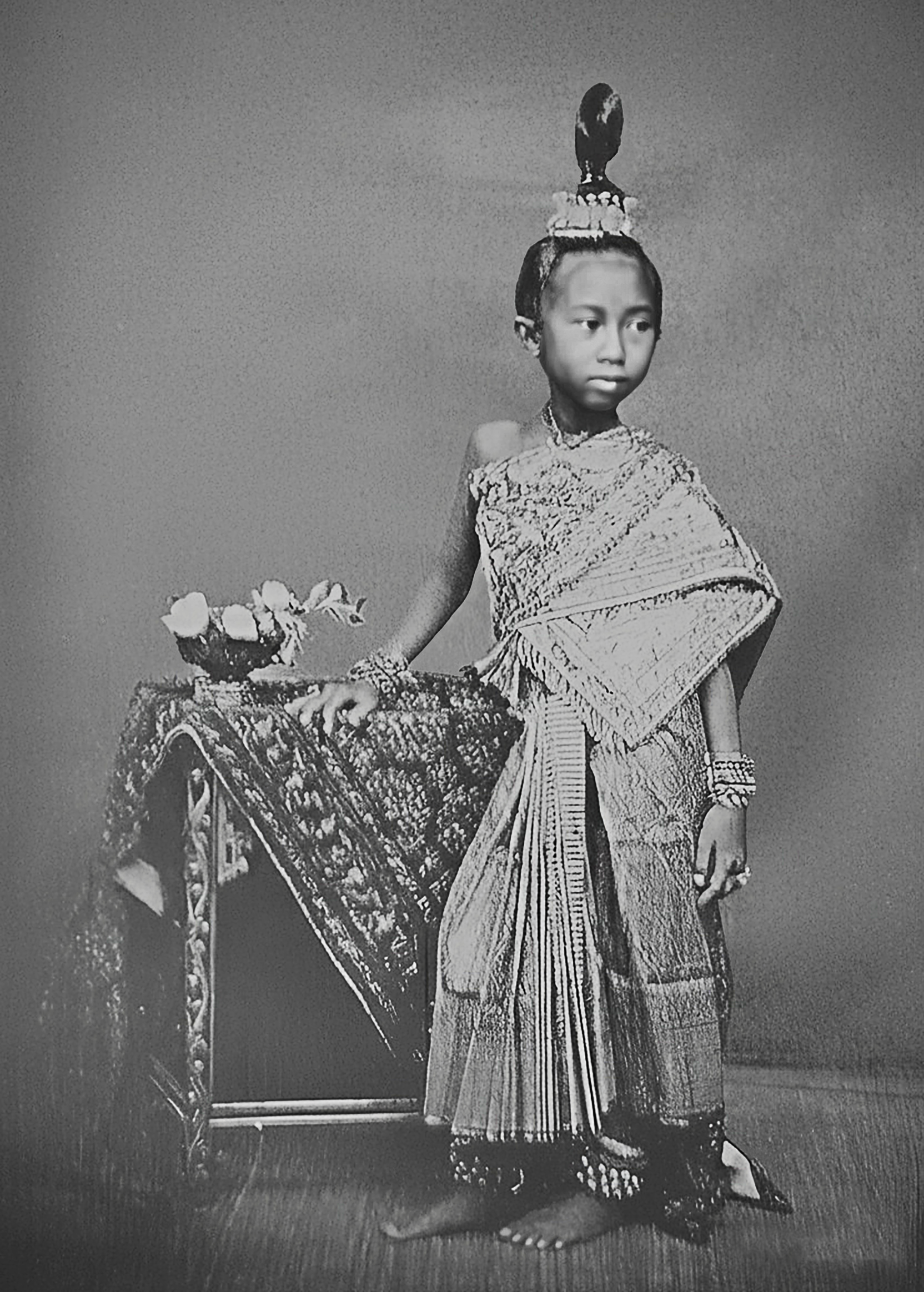
Young Princess Phunphitsamai Ditsakun, 1900

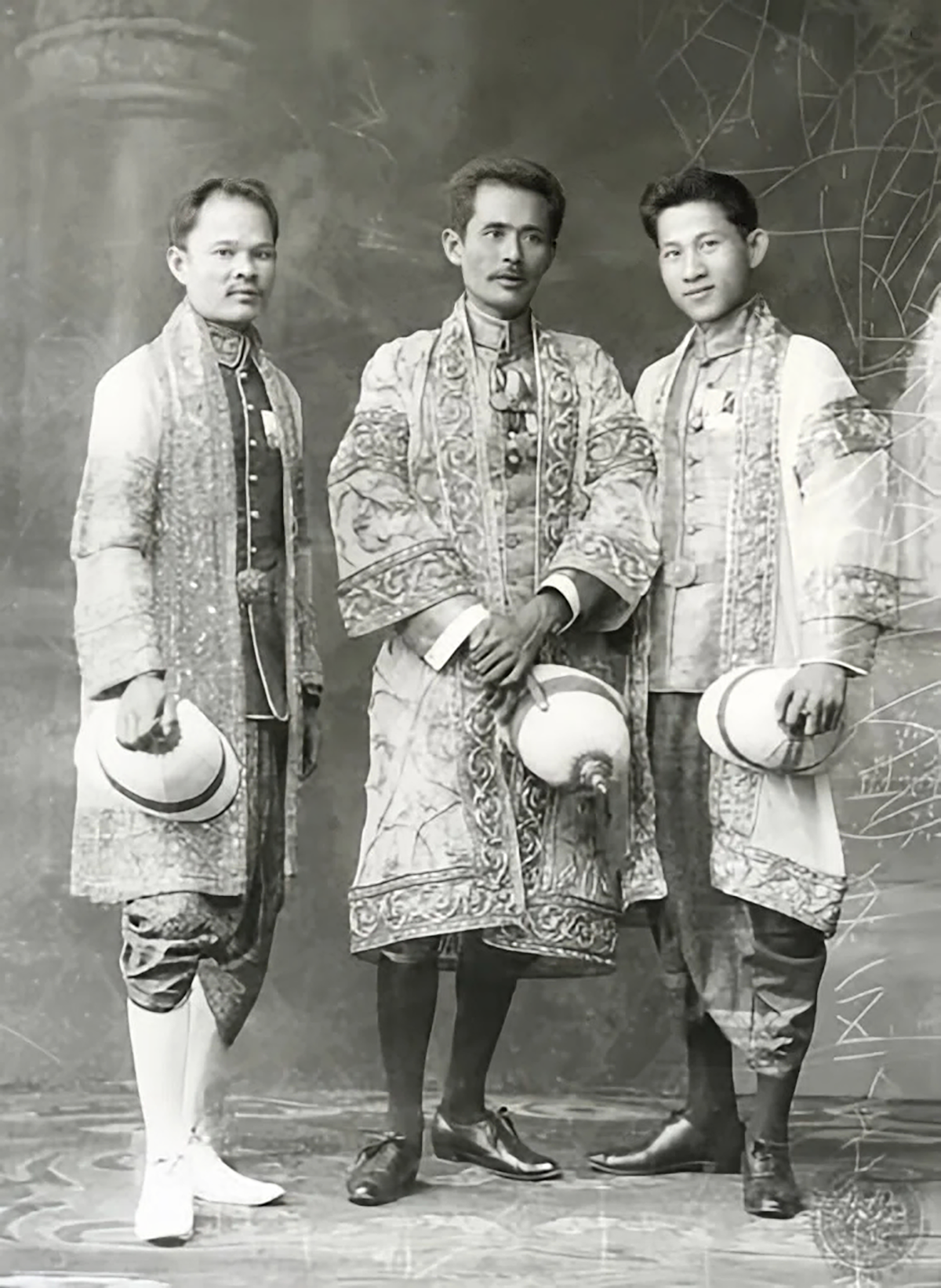
Three Thai noblemen in Siamese Royal Court attire, 1890

== Design Development ==
=== Design for Men ===
In designing the formal Thai national costume for men, King Bhumibol adapted traditional Thai attire for modern use.

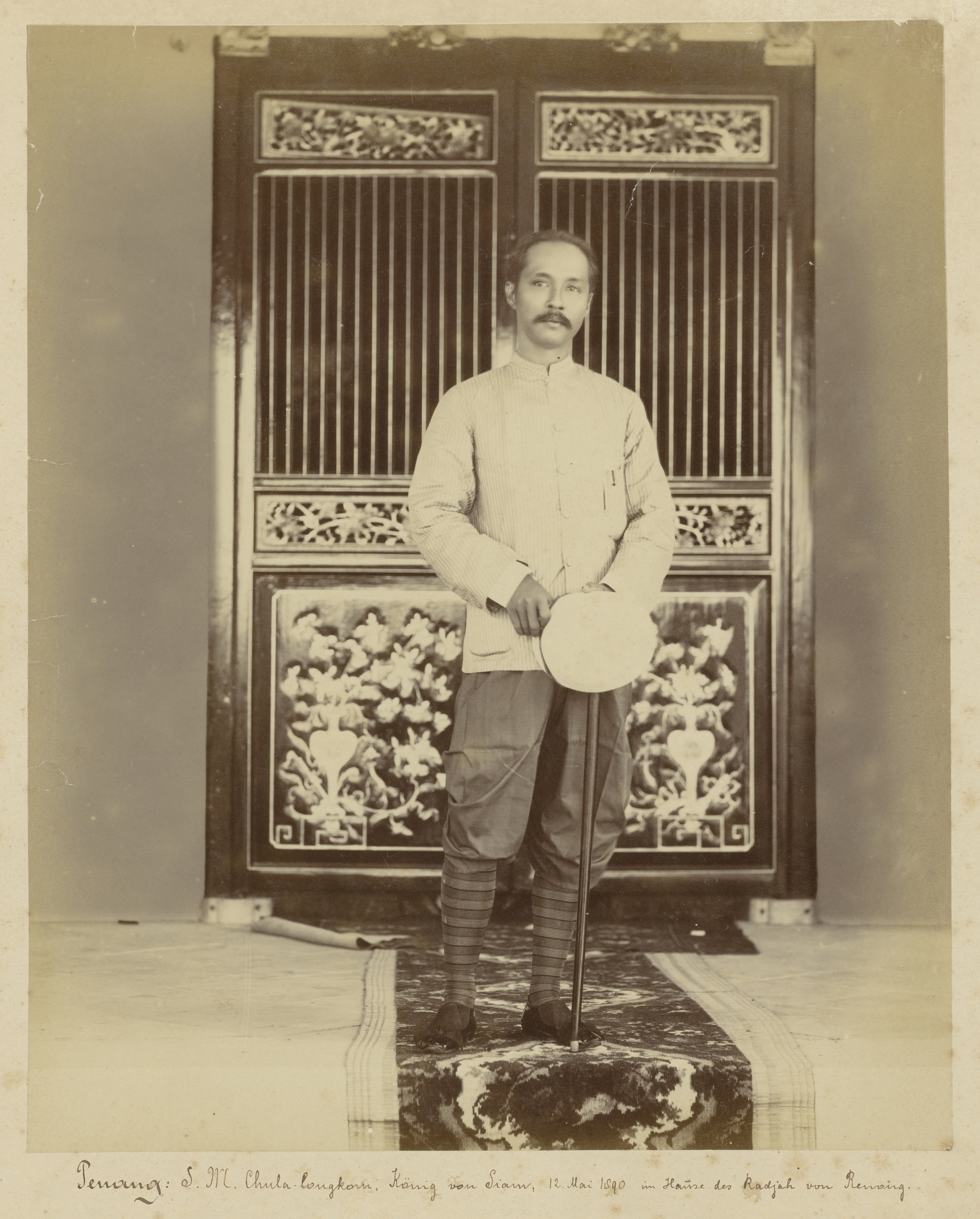
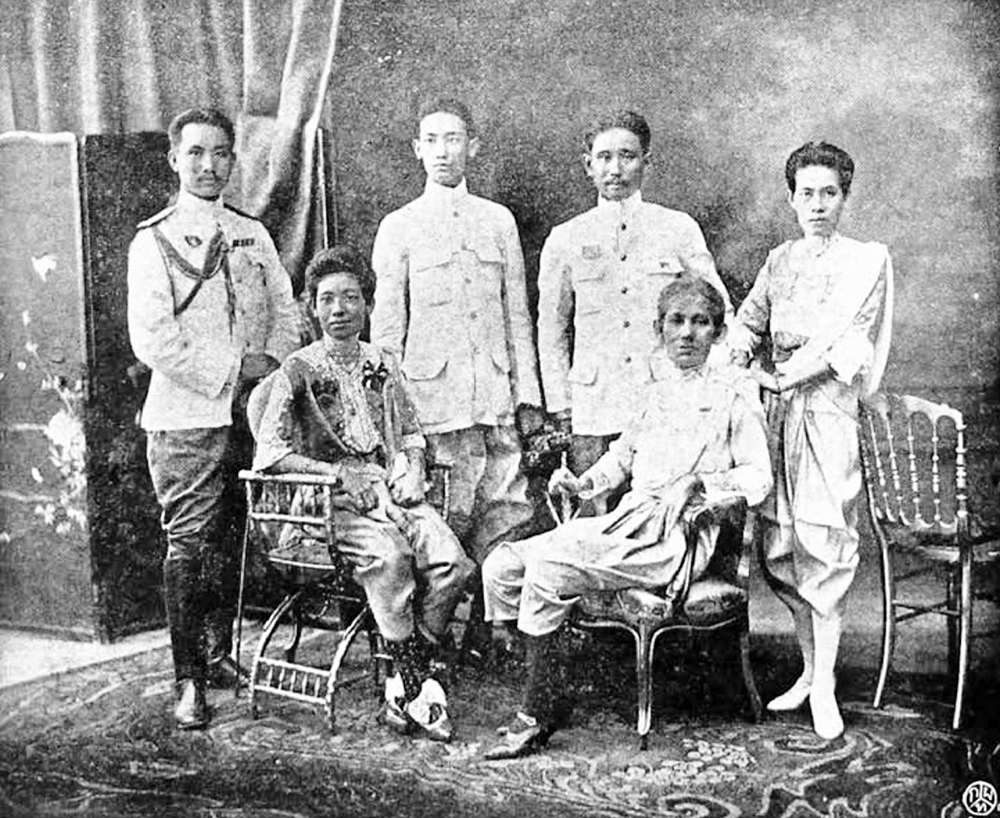
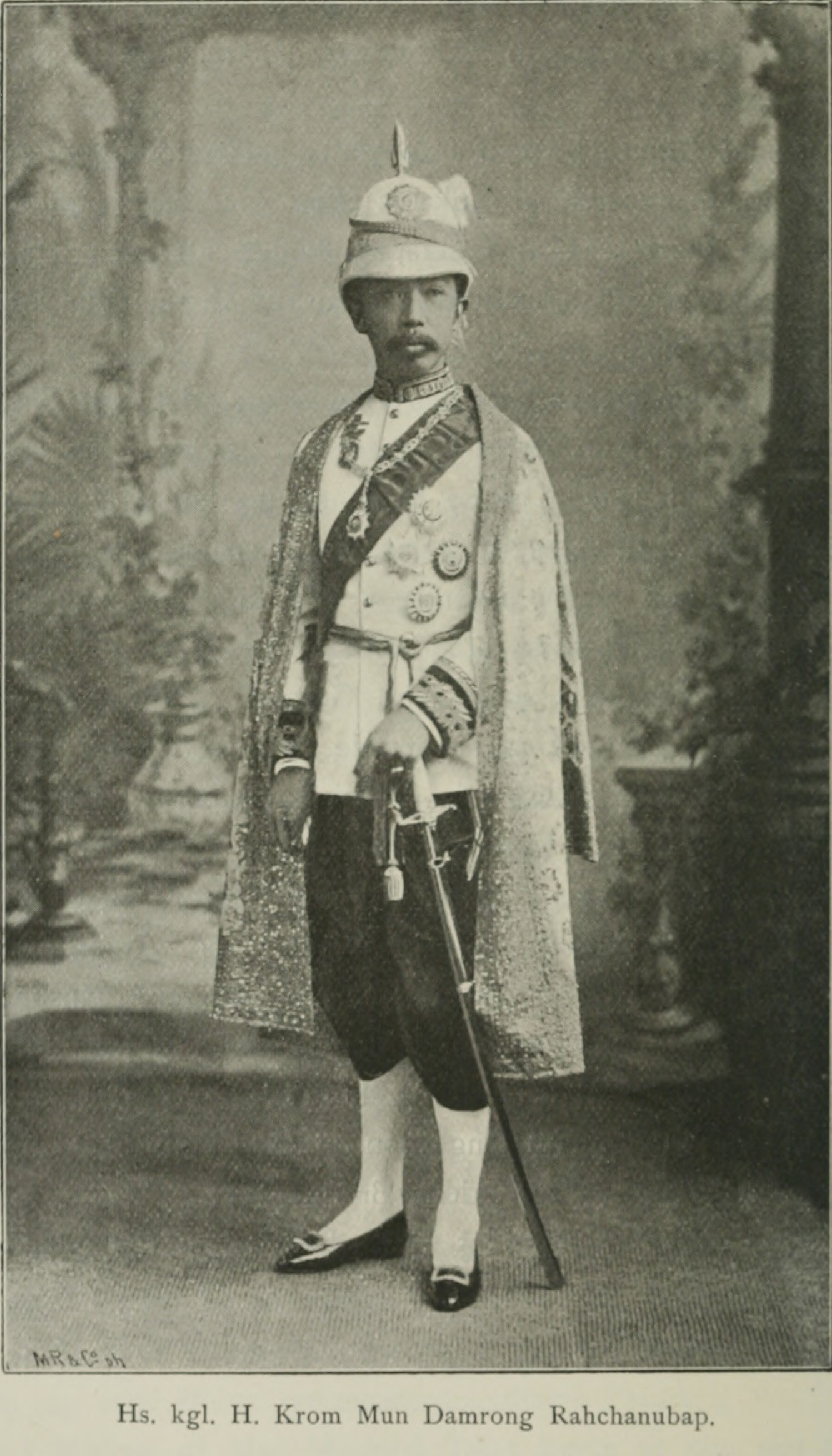
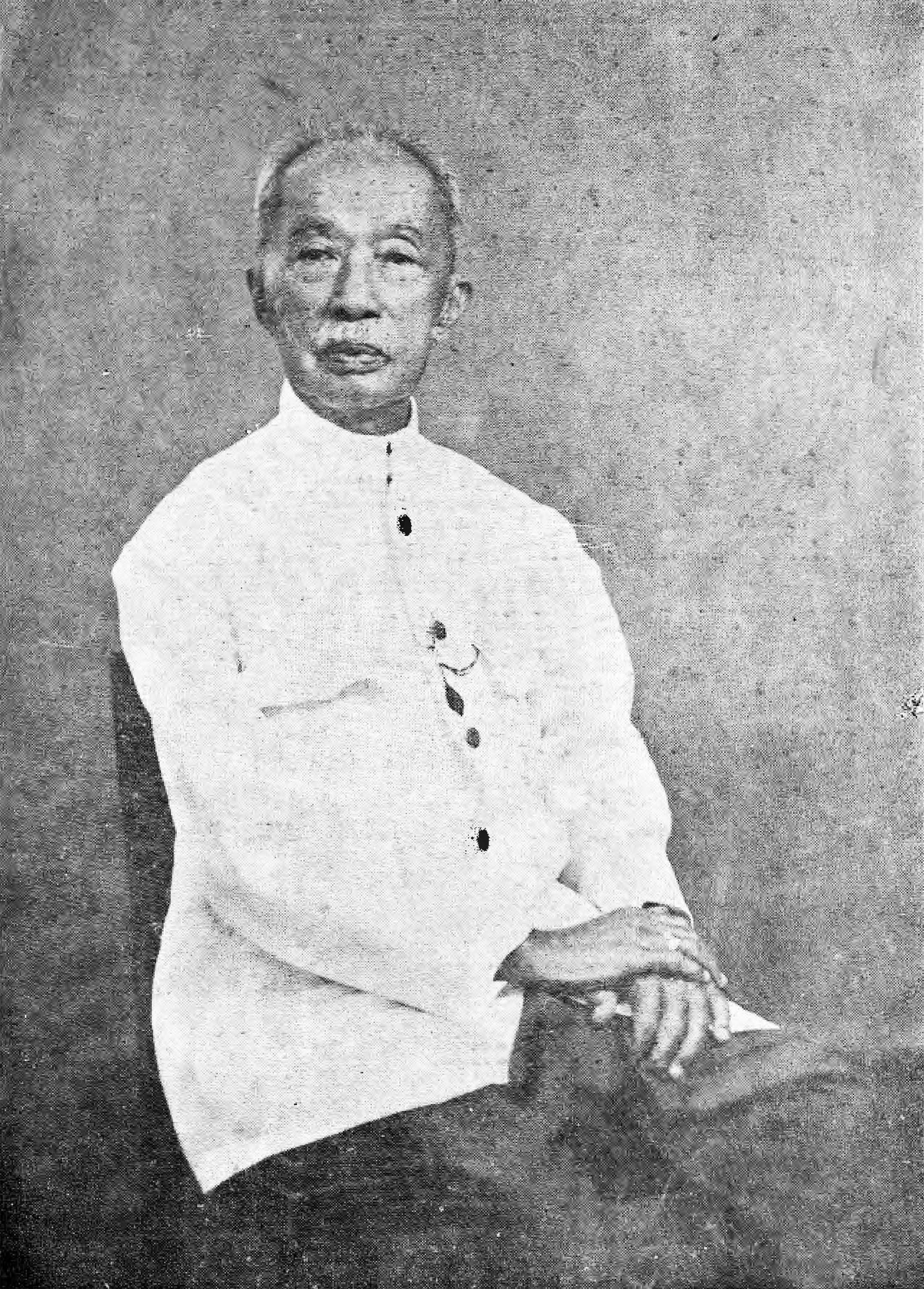
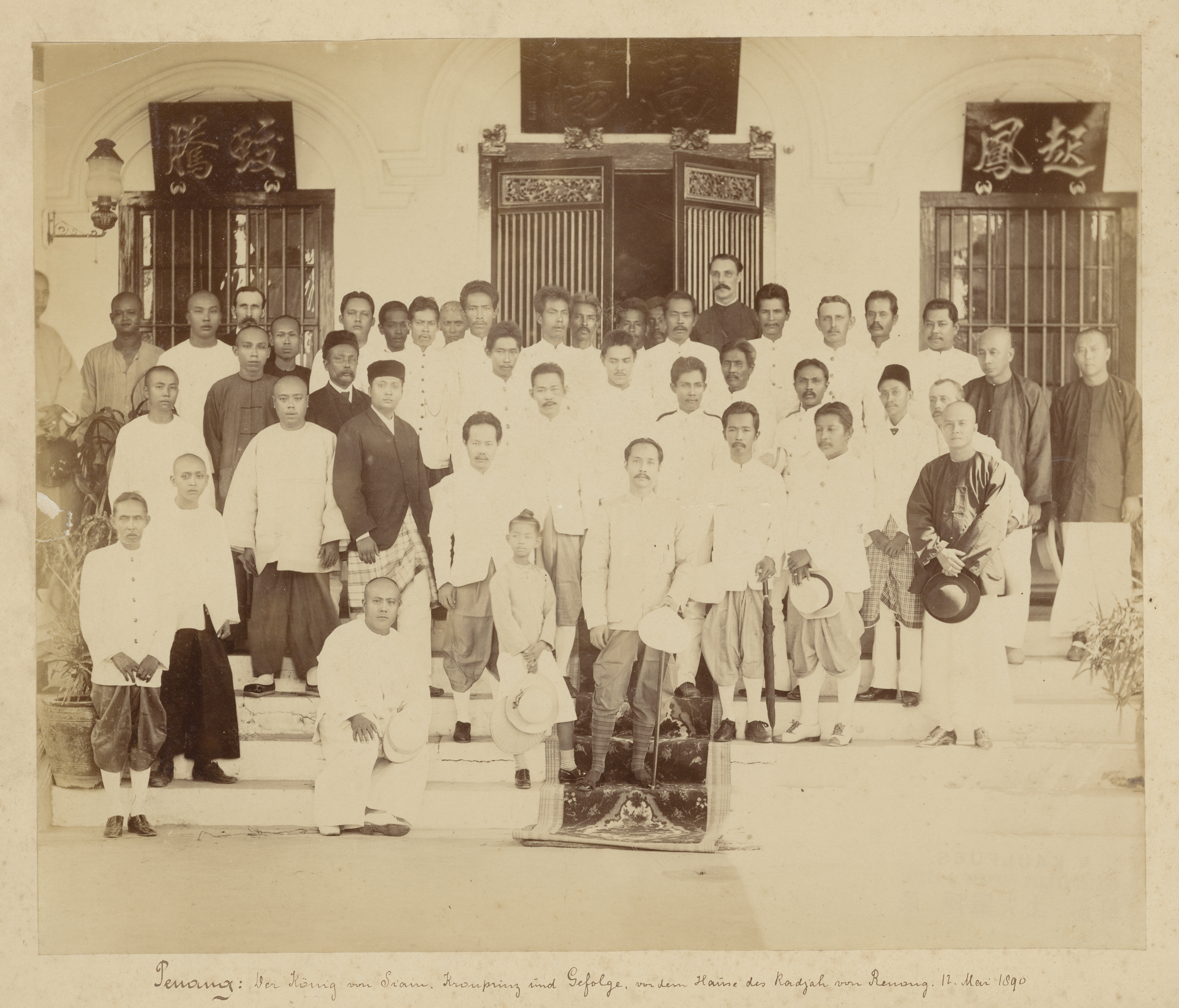
King Chulalongkorn and Siamese men wearing traditional Thai attire in the 1800s-1900s

The shirt shares the appearance of the raj pattern jacket, which itself is an older widely adopted version in Thailand with similarities to the Nehru jacket. The suea phraratchathan is specified as having a standing (Mandarin) collar 3.5 to 4 centimetres in height, being slightly tapered at the sides, hemmed at the edges of the collar, placket and sleeves, with five round flat buttons covered with a material identical or similar to that of the shirt. It should have two outer pockets at the front, at a level slightly higher than the lowermost button, may have a left-sided breast pocket, and may either be vented or not.

The shirt comes in three varieties: short-sleeved, long-sleeved, and long-sleeved with a sash, which range from the least to most formal, respectively. The long-sleeved versions should have 4 to 5 centimetres-wide cuffs of the same material as the shirt, and the sash, when used, should be knotted at the left side. The shirt is worn with trousers as would be with a suit jacket.

=== Design for Women ===
In designing the formal Thai national costume for women, Queen Sirikit adapted traditional Thai dress for modern use.

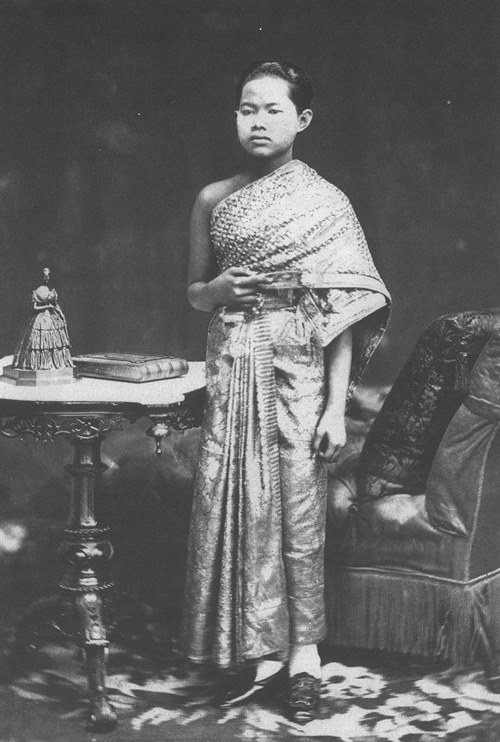
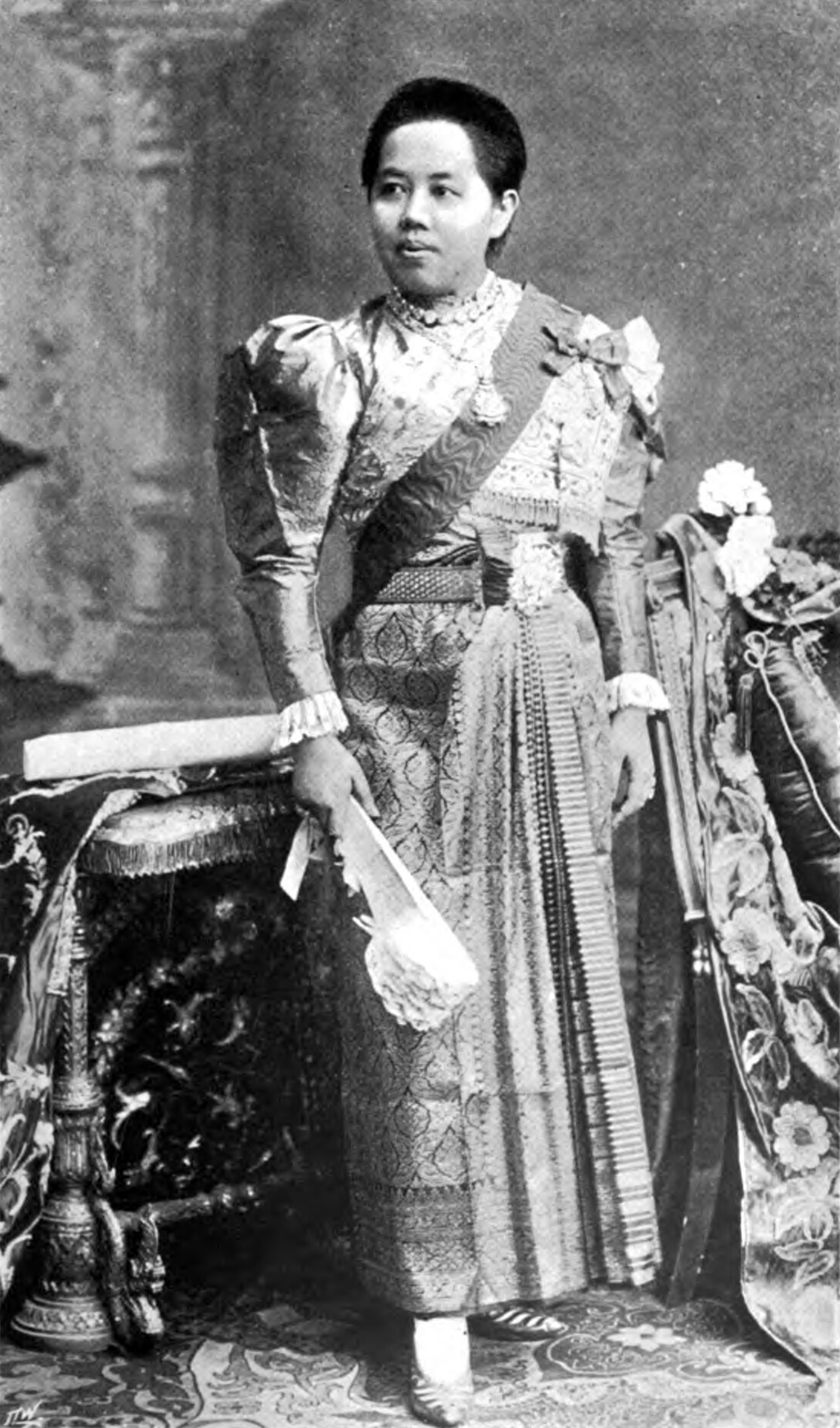
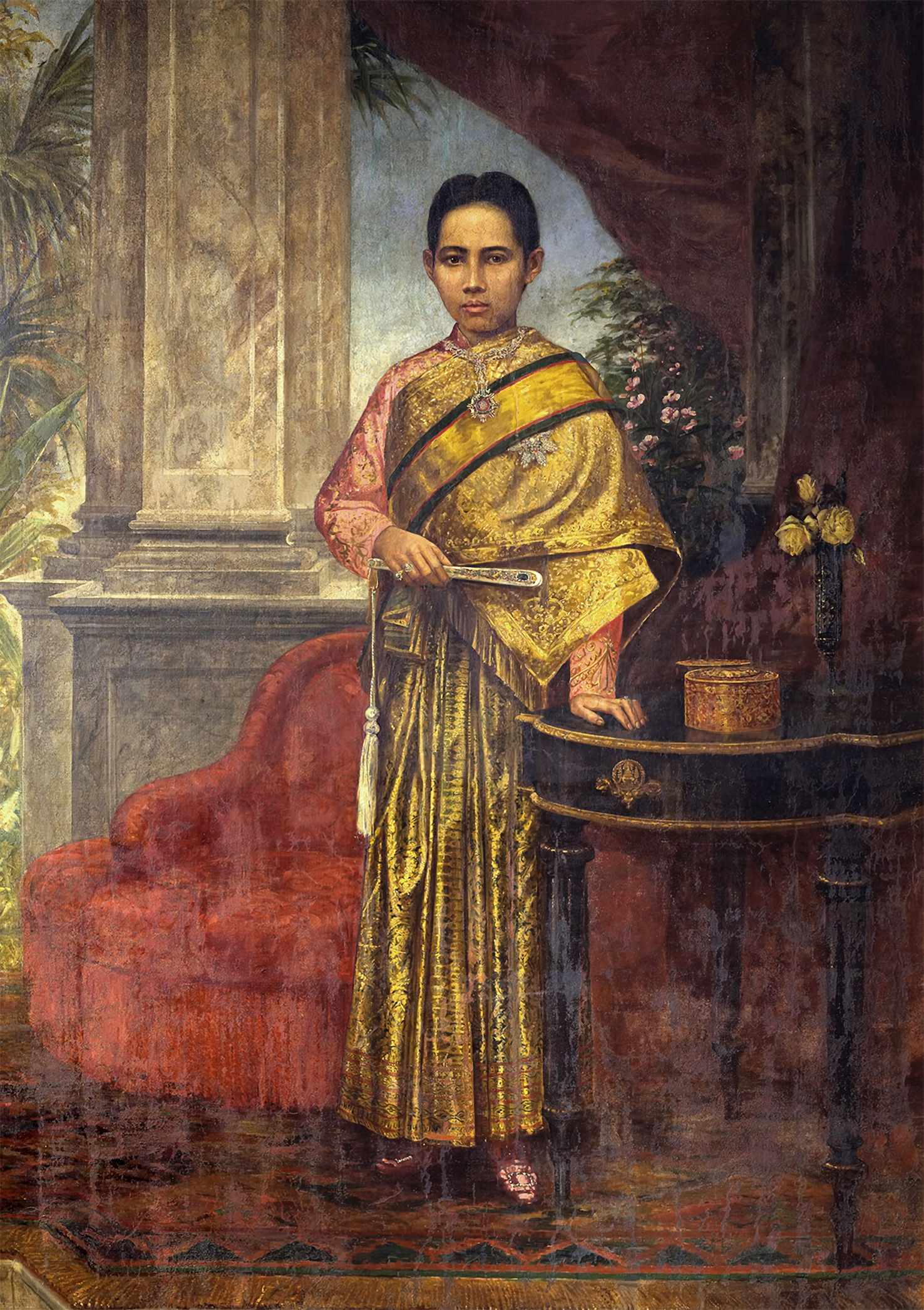
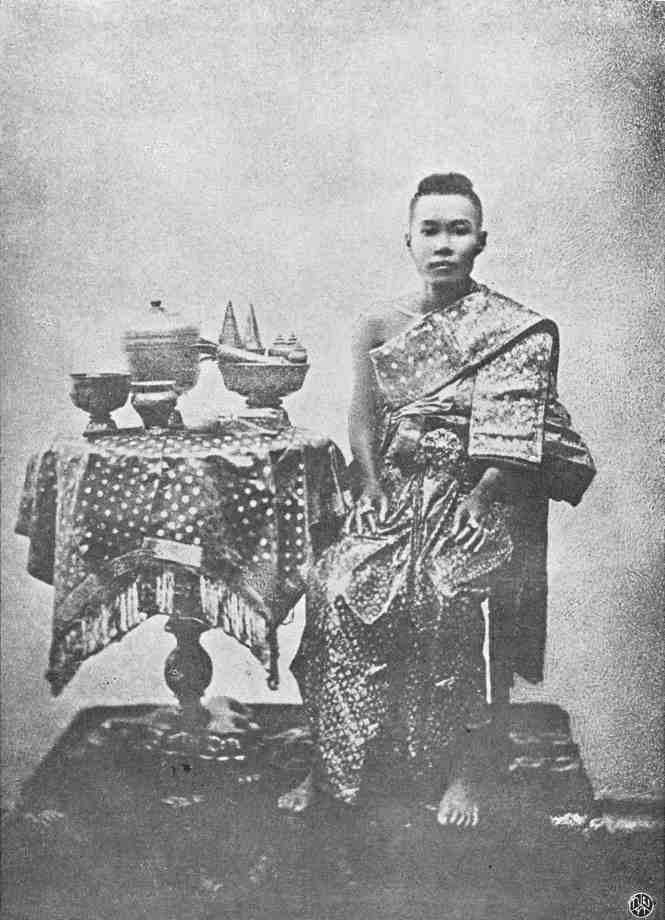
Clockwise: 1. Queen Consort Sunandha 2. Queen Consort Saovabha 3. Queen Consort Savang Vadhana 4. Queen Consort Debsirindra with the pleated lower garment, the saphak drape and the long tubular sleeve blouse

The pleated lower garment (Thai: การนุ่งจีบ, Thai pronunciation: [kaː nûŋ tɕìːp]) appears in records from the Ayutthaya Kingdom and continued into the Rattanakosin Kingdom. She applied this pleating method to five styles. These include Chud Thai Boromphiman, Chud Thai Dusit, Chud Thai Siwalai, Chud Thai Chakri, and Chud Thai Chakkraphat. She combined hand pleating with modern tailoring. The design improved comfort and preserved form, using pha thung, pha nung or pha sin.

The saphak drape (Thai: การห่มผ้าทรงสะพัก, Thai pronunciation: [kaːn hòm pʰâː soŋ sà.pʰák]), appears in court records from Ayutthaya. Royal women used it to signal rank. She restored this drape in Chud Thai Siwalai and Chud Thai Chakkraphat. This decision reinforced court tradition and national identity, using saphak or sabai.

The long tubular sleeve blouse (Thai: เสื้อแขนกระบอก, Thai pronunciation: [sɯ̂a kʰɛ̌ːn krà.bɔ̀ːk]), developed after Western dress influenced Siam in the nineteenth century. Women shifted from upper body draping to stitched garments. She integrated this blouse into five styles. These include Chud Thai Ruean Ton, Chud Thai Chitralada, Chud Thai Amarin, Chud Thai Boromphiman, and Chud Thai Siwalai. The structure supported movement and maintained a formal silhouette.

The ready made pha thung (Thai: ผ้าถุงสำเร็จ, Thai pronunciation: [pʰâː tʰǔŋ sǎm.rèt]), evolved from earlier wrap skirts (Pha thung/Pha nung/Pha sin). Princess Valaya Alongkorn, daughter of King Chulalongkorn, introduced a stitched version for ease of wear. Queen Sirikit adopted this format in Chud Thai Ruean Ton, Chud Thai Chitralada, and Chud Thai Amarin. She preserved traditional structure and improved daily function.

== Preservation ==
=== Preservation of Thai Textiles ===
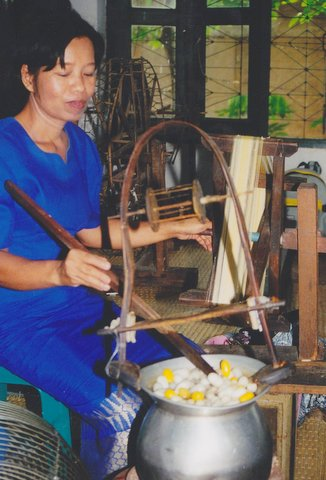
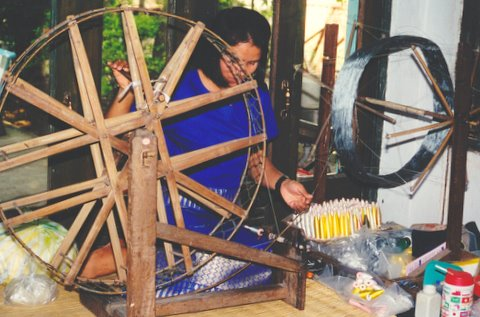
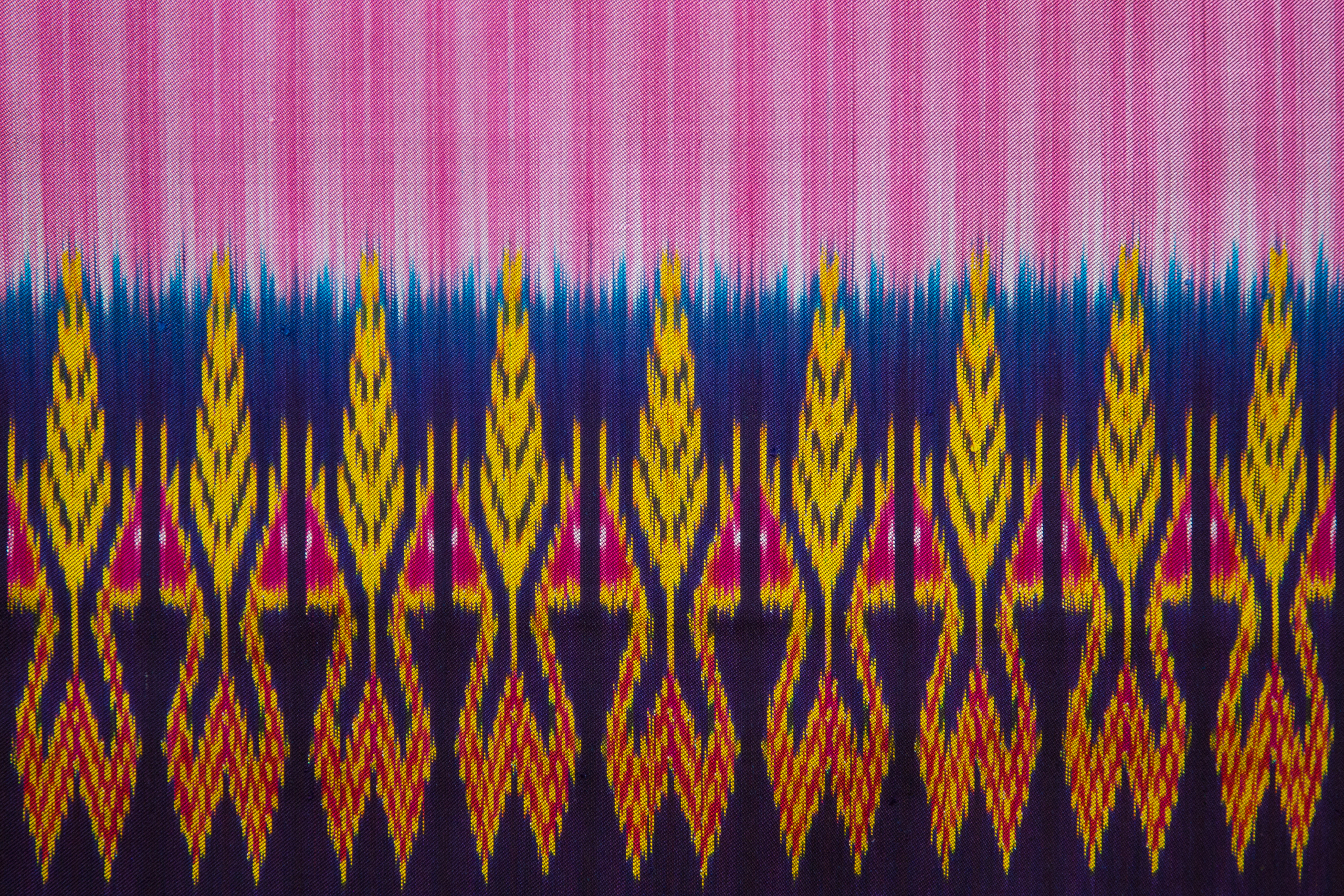
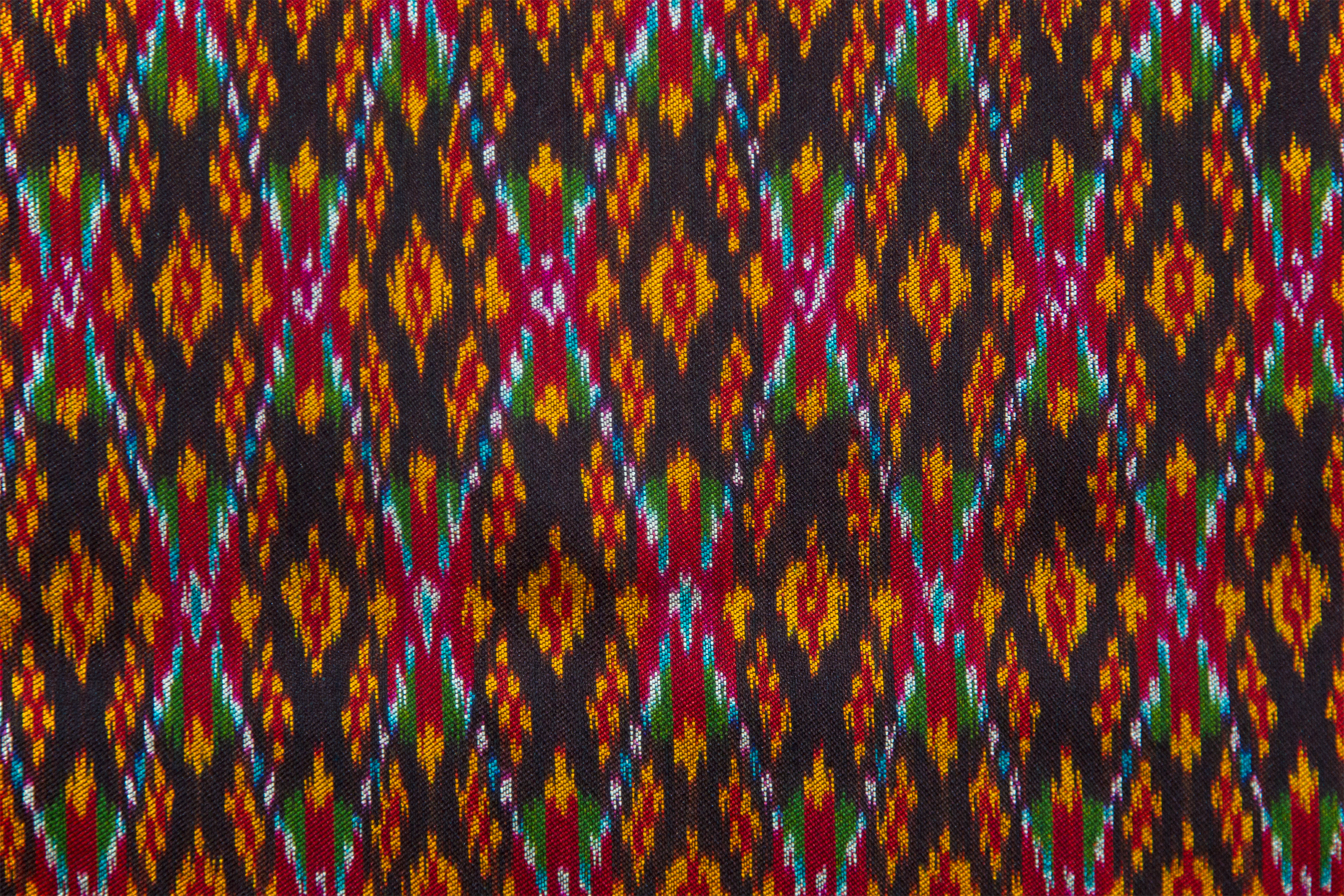
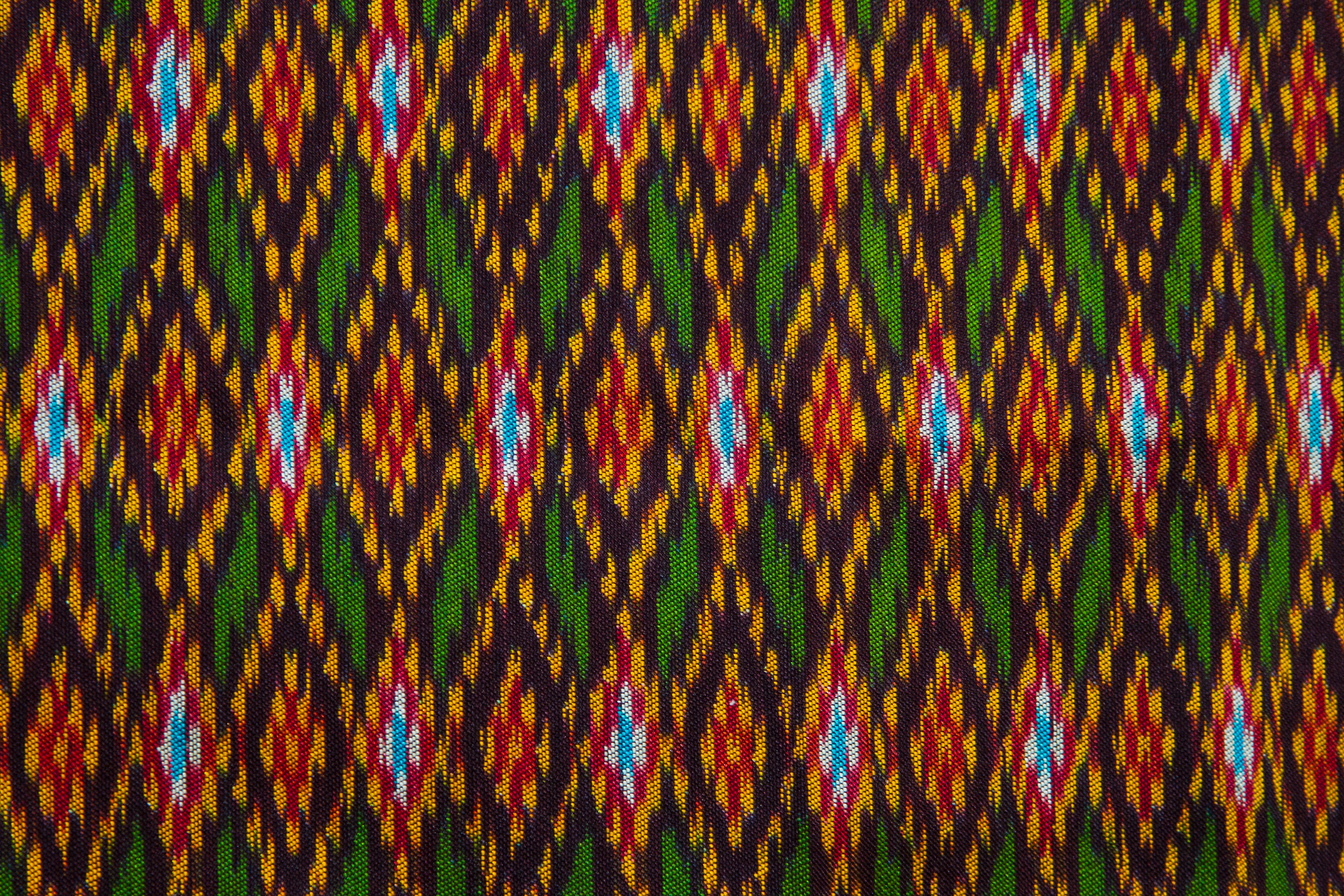
Thai villagers boiling the initial phase of making silk and spinning side on a spinning wheel to produce Thai textiles

Queen Sirikit gave priority to reviving traditional Thai textiles in local communities. She selected handwoven fabrics from village artisans and tailored them into the formal Thai national costume (Chud Thai Phra Ratcha Niyom).

One example is Yok Nakhon Thammang brocade (Thai: ผ้ายกเนินธัมมัง). In 1993, during a visit with King Bhumibol Adulyadej to Nakhon Si Thammarat, local residents faced flooding and acidic soil conditions. She introduced handicraft production as supplementary work to generate income. This initiative revived local weaving skills and restored Yok brocade, which had declined for decades.

In 2004, she commissioned textile experts to transfer weaving knowledge to members of the SUPPORT Foundation groups in Ban Ner Thammang and Ban Trok Khae. Artisans revived Yok Mueang Nakhon brocade (Thai: ผ้ายกเมืองนคร), a court textile absent for over one hundred years. Local weavers later produced gold Yok brocade for costumes used in Khon performances organized by the Foundation for the Promotion of Supplementary Occupations and Related Techniques. This effort preserved a significant cultural heritage.

Examples of varieties of Thai textiles protected as geographical indications include Lamphun Brocade, Chonnabot Mudmee and Phrae Wa Kalasin.

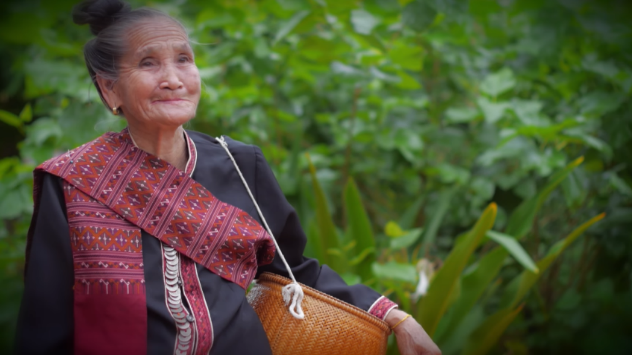
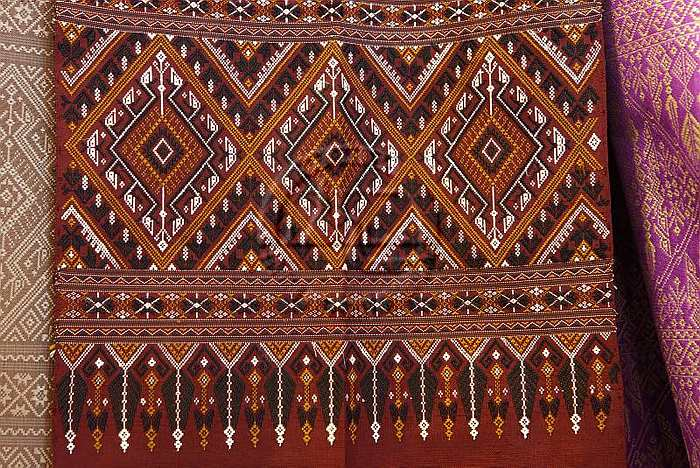
An indigenous Phu Thai woman with Phrae Wa Kalasin

Queen Sirikit was introduced to Phrae Wa during a visit to Kalasin province in 1977. Phrae Wa is the only silk that is formally recognized as the “Queen of Thai Silk” due to its intricate patterns, vibrant colors, shinning texture, and unyielding beauty. These are on display in the Queen Sirikit Museum of Textiles.

=== Preservation of Thai Silk ===
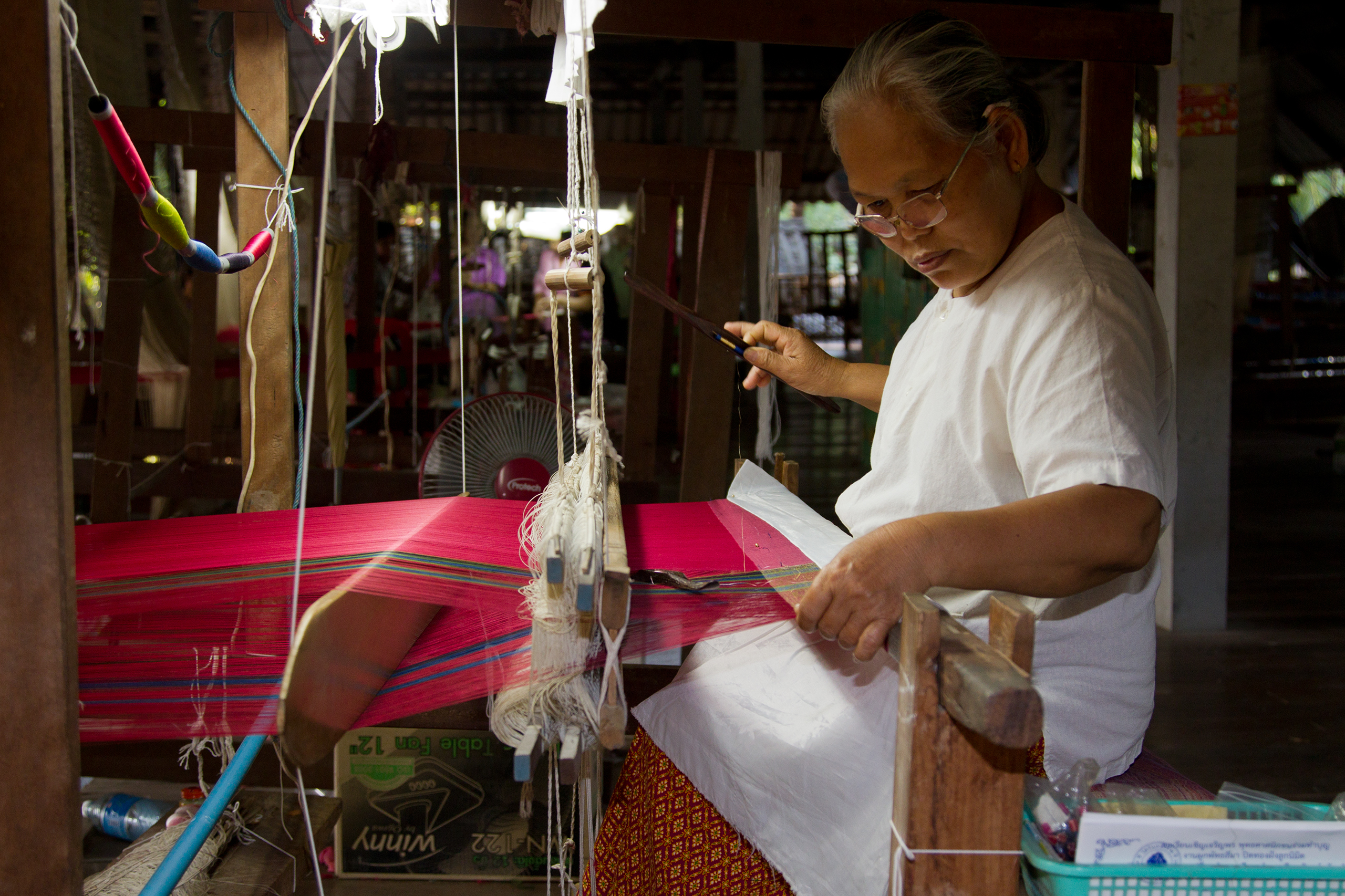
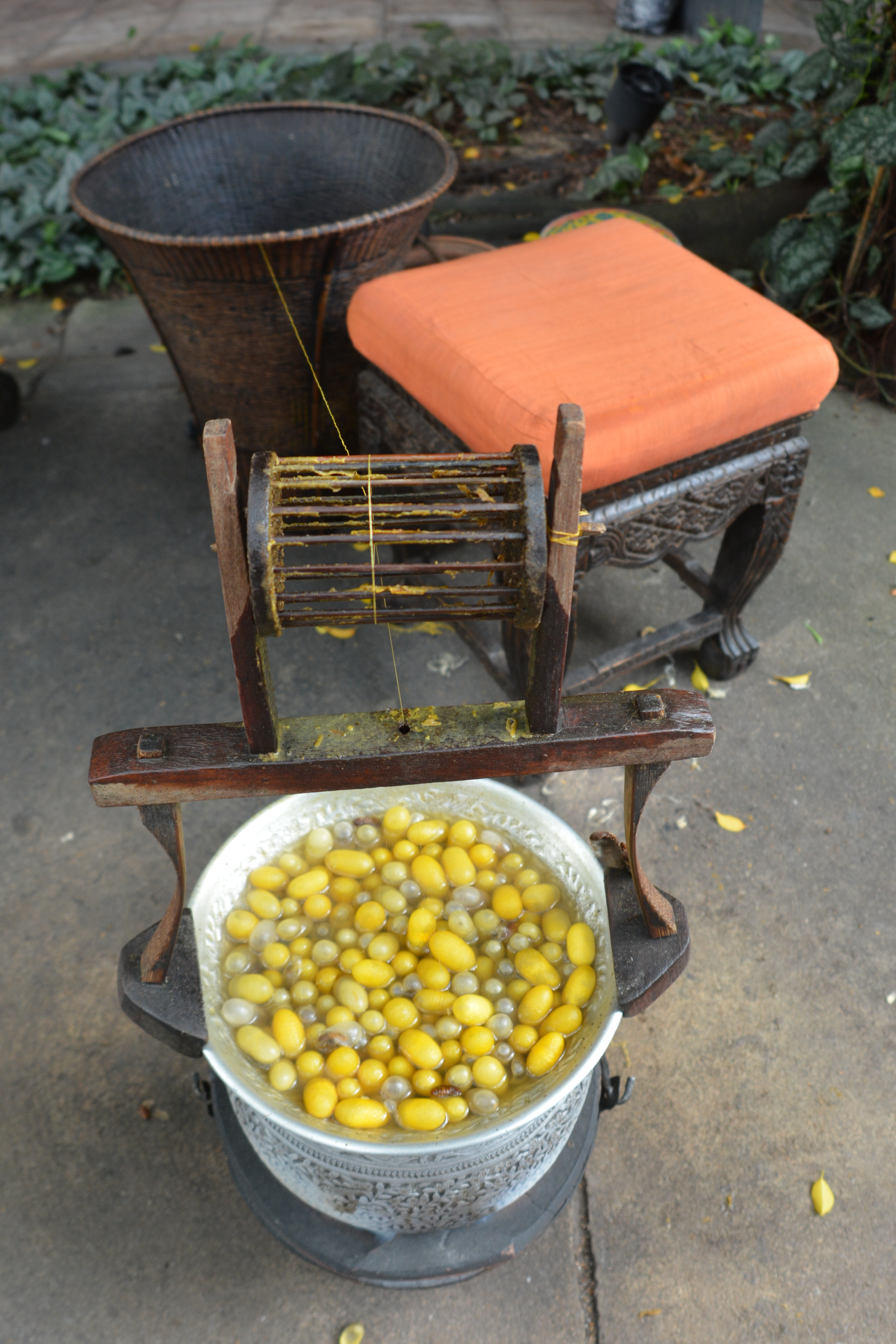
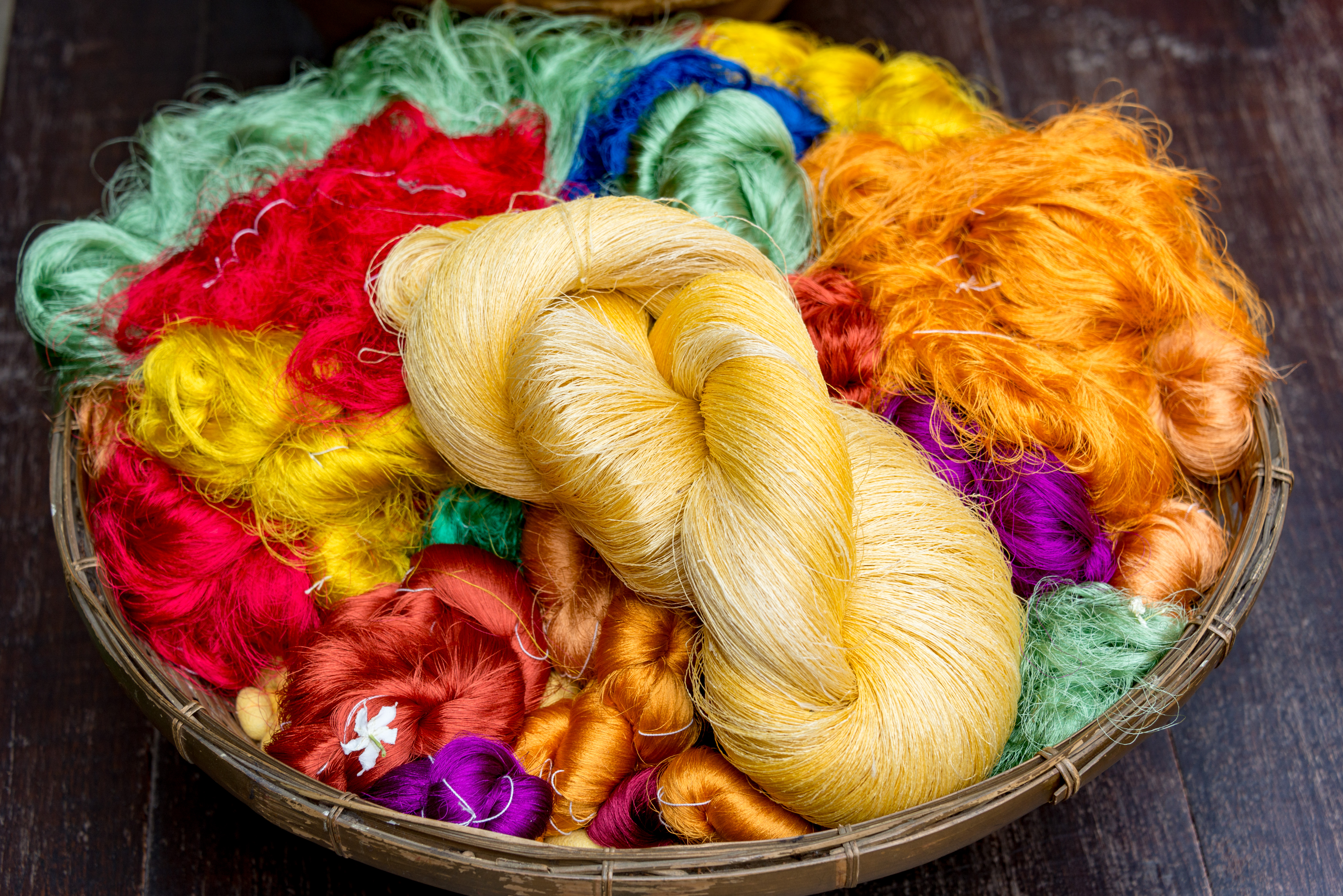
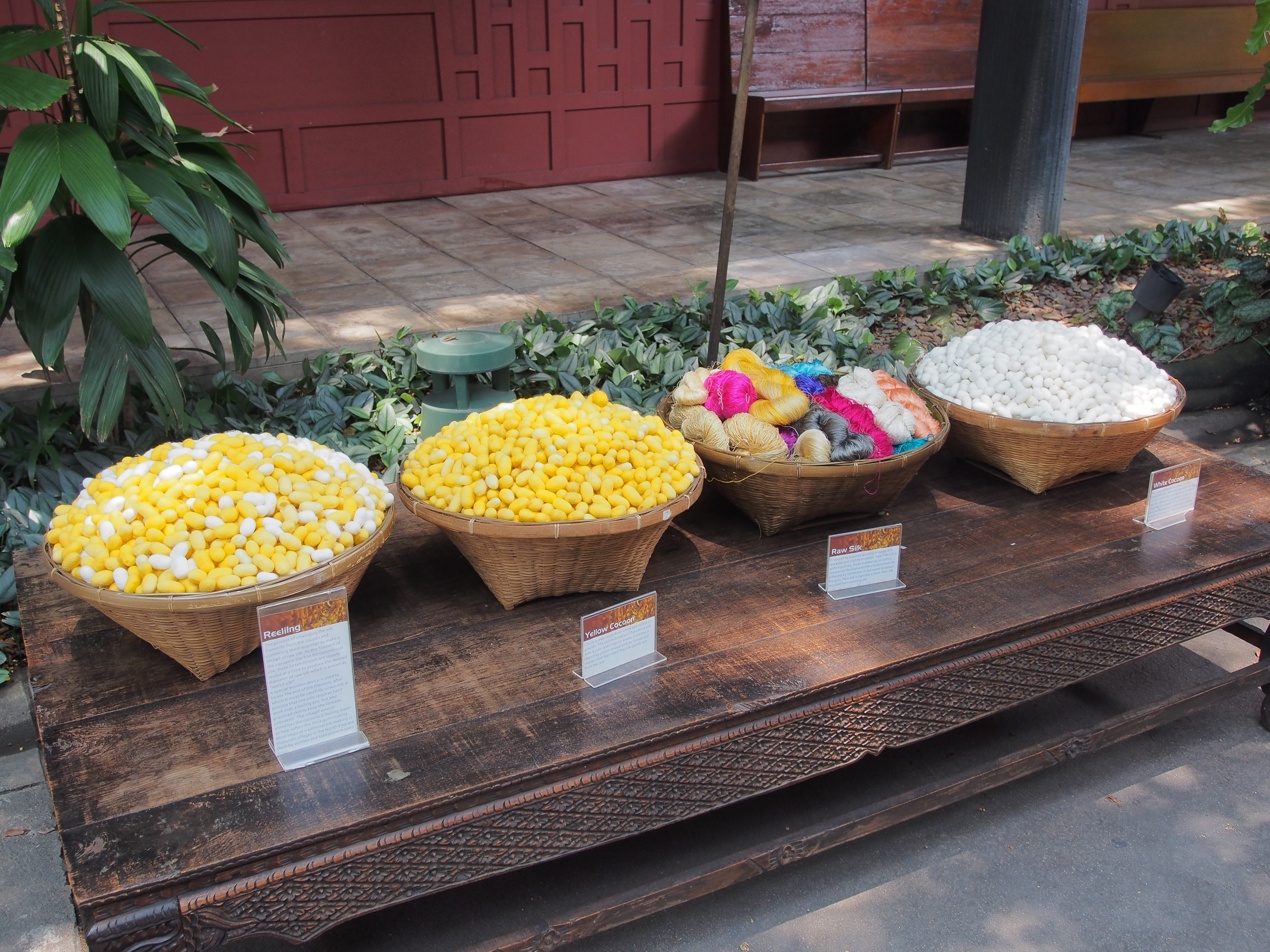
A Thai villager weaving silk in Surin and Jim Thompson Thai Silk Hand Weaving Gallery at the Jim Thompson House Bangkok

For decades, Thai citizens have seen Queen Sirikit wear Thai silk on formal and state occasions. She promoted a full production system. This system covered mulberry cultivation, silkworm rearing, natural dye processes, and distribution. Through the SUPPORT Foundation, she strengthened rural income and textile standards.

In 2002, the International Sericultural Commission (ISC) presented her with the Louis Pasteur Award for promoting Thai silk internationally.

In 2007, she introduced the Thai Peacock certification mark to standardize Thai silk into four categories:

- Gold peacock: Indicates premium Royal Thai Silk, a product of native Thai silkworm breeds and traditional hand-made production.
- Silver peacock: Indicates Classic Thai Silk, developed from specific silkworm breeds and hand-made production.
- Blue peacock: Indicates Thai Silk, a product of pure silk threads and with no specific production method (allows chemical dyes).
- Green peacock: Indicates Thai Silk Blend, a product of silk blended with other fabrics and with no specific production method.

Authorities registered this certification in more than thirty five countries. The Ministry of Agriculture and Cooperatives established the Queen Sirikit Department of Sericulture Institute in 2005 and elevated it to the Department of Sericulture in 2009 to oversee silk development and markets.

In 2012, the Thai Cabinet conferred upon her the title "Mother of Thai Silk" in honor of her eightieth birthday.

== Formal Chud Thai (Men) ==
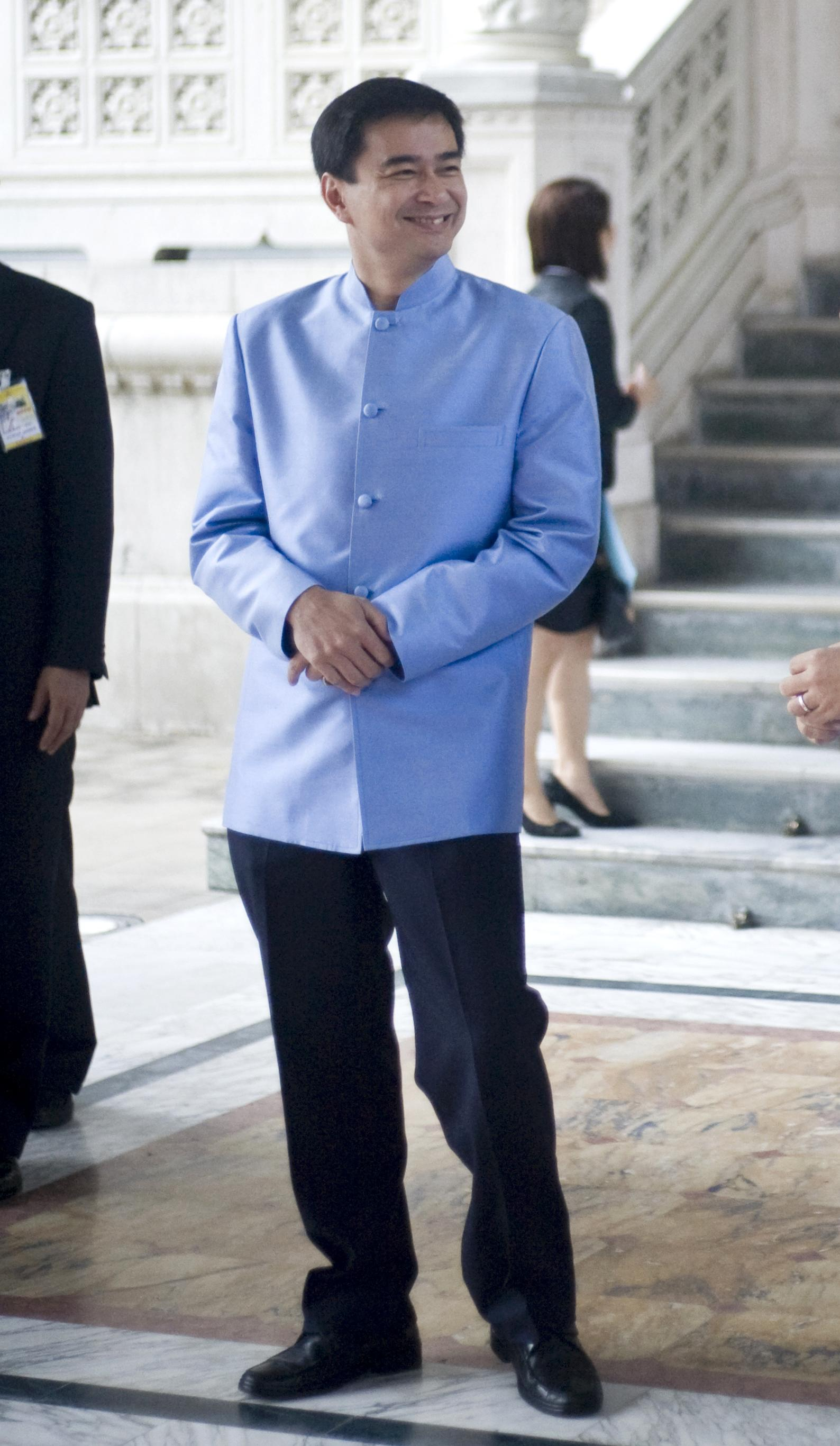
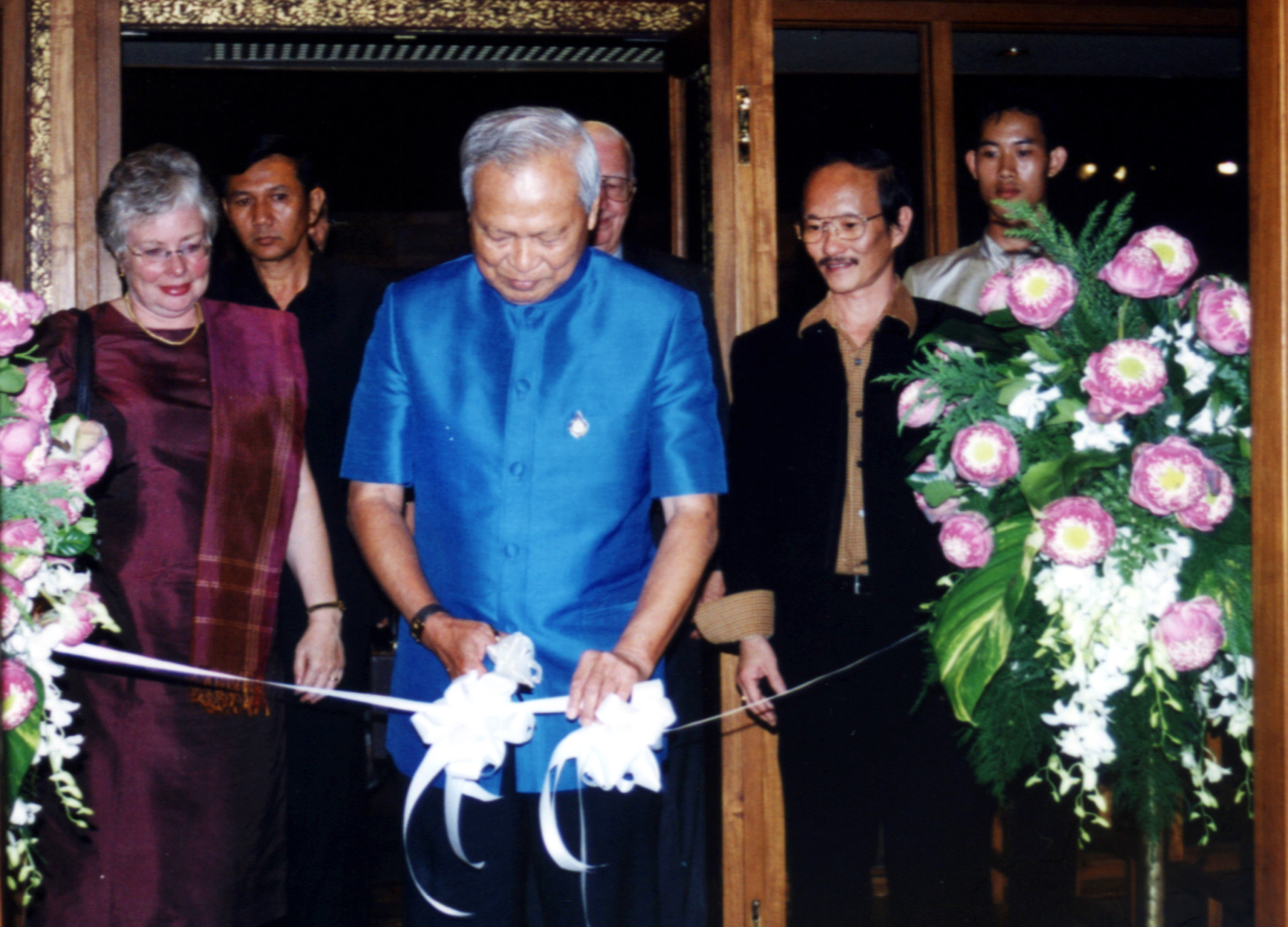
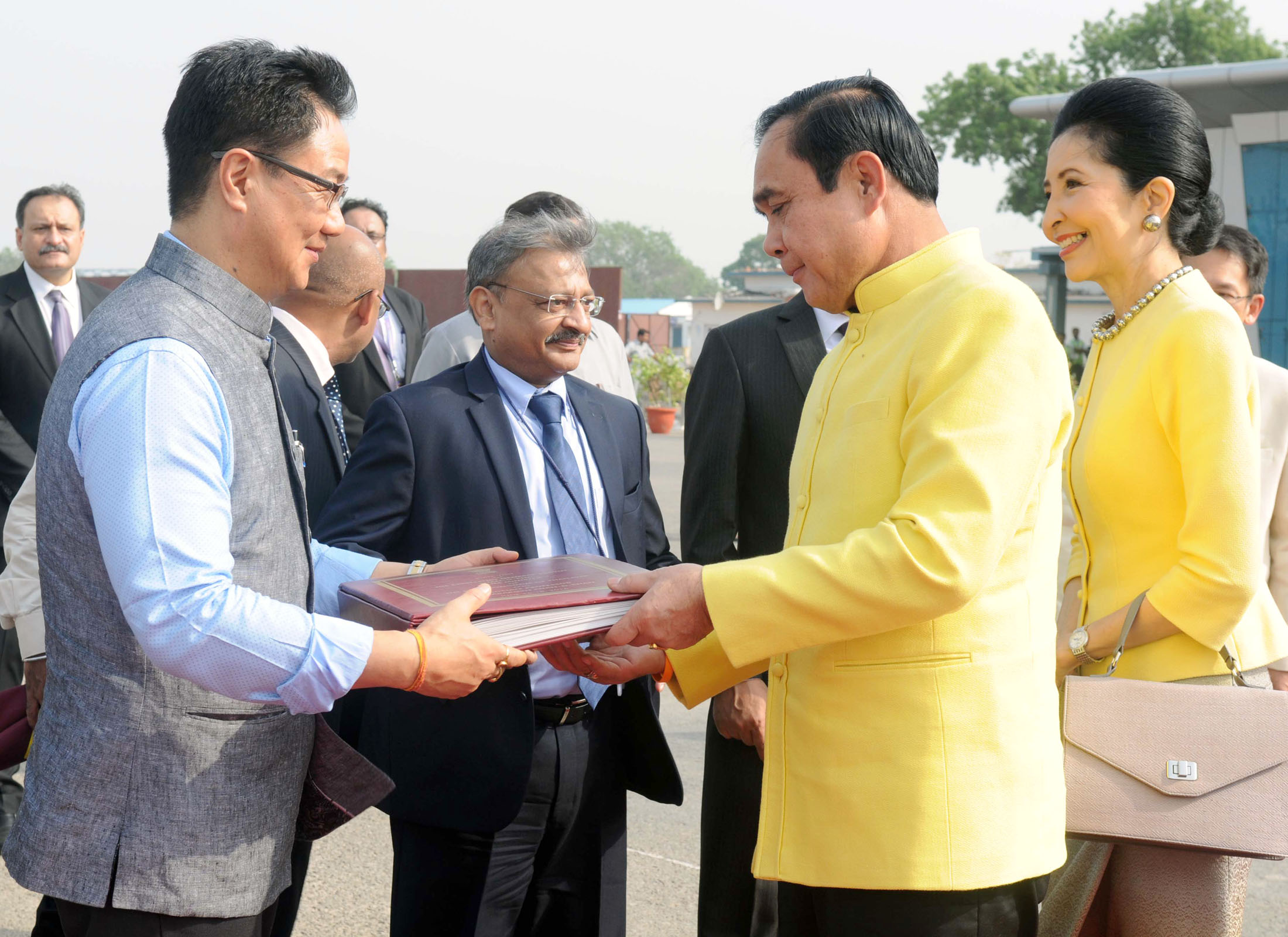
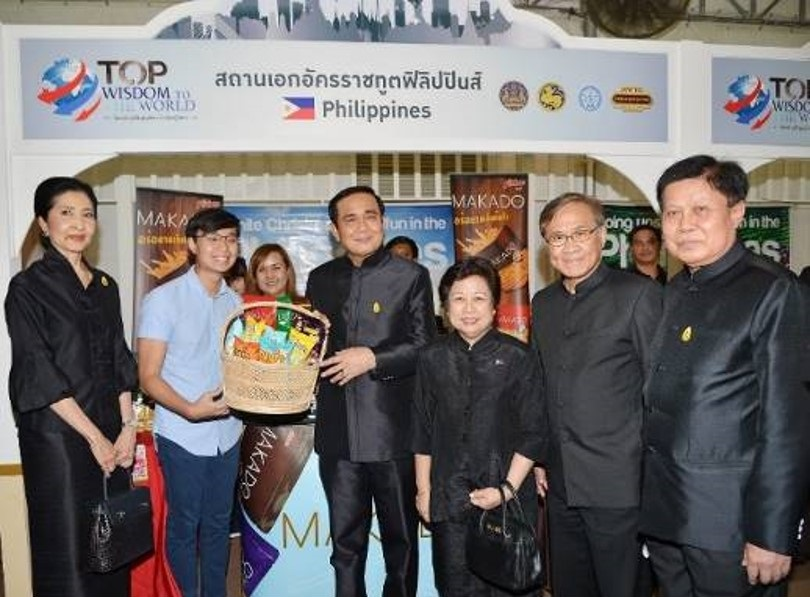
Clockwise: 1. Abhisit Vejjajiva 2. Prem Tinsulanonda 3. Prayut Chan-o-cha, the former Prime Ministers of Thailand

The men's national costume is known as suea phraratchathan (เสื้อพระราชทาน Thai pronunciation: [sɯ̂a.pʰrá.râat.tɕʰa.tʰaan], lit. 'royally bestowed shirt'). It was designed to serve as a national costume by several royally-endorsed tailors for King Bhumibol Adulyadej in 1979, and was subsequently given to General Prem Tinsulanonda, then the Minister of Defense, to promote and wear in public. Prem remained the shirt's most recognised wearer, although it has been adopted by many, especially politicians and civil officials, on special occasions. Many have begun wearing the shirt for ceremonies such as their own weddings. The garment comes in three styles:

=== Short-sleeved Chud Thai ===
Worn for everyday occasions, at work, or at daytime ceremonies, this style uses light colors or modest patterns. Darker colors are also worn at evening ceremonies.

=== Long-sleeved Chud Thai ===
Light colors or modest patterns are worn for daytime ceremonies, and darker colors for evening ones.

=== Long-sleeved Chud Thai with waist sash ===
This is the full formal version, worn only on important ceremonial occasions.

== Formal Chud Thai (Women) ==
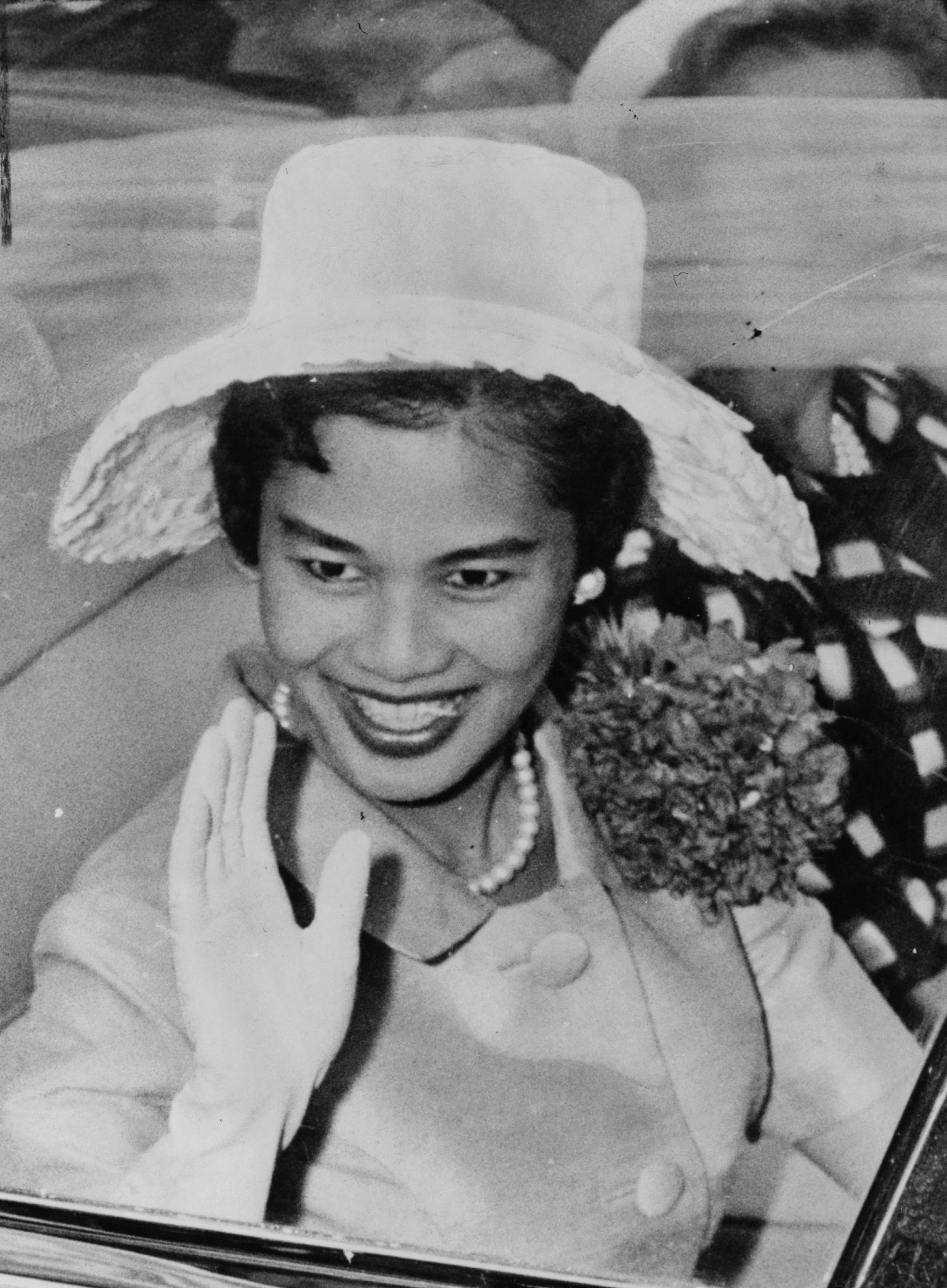
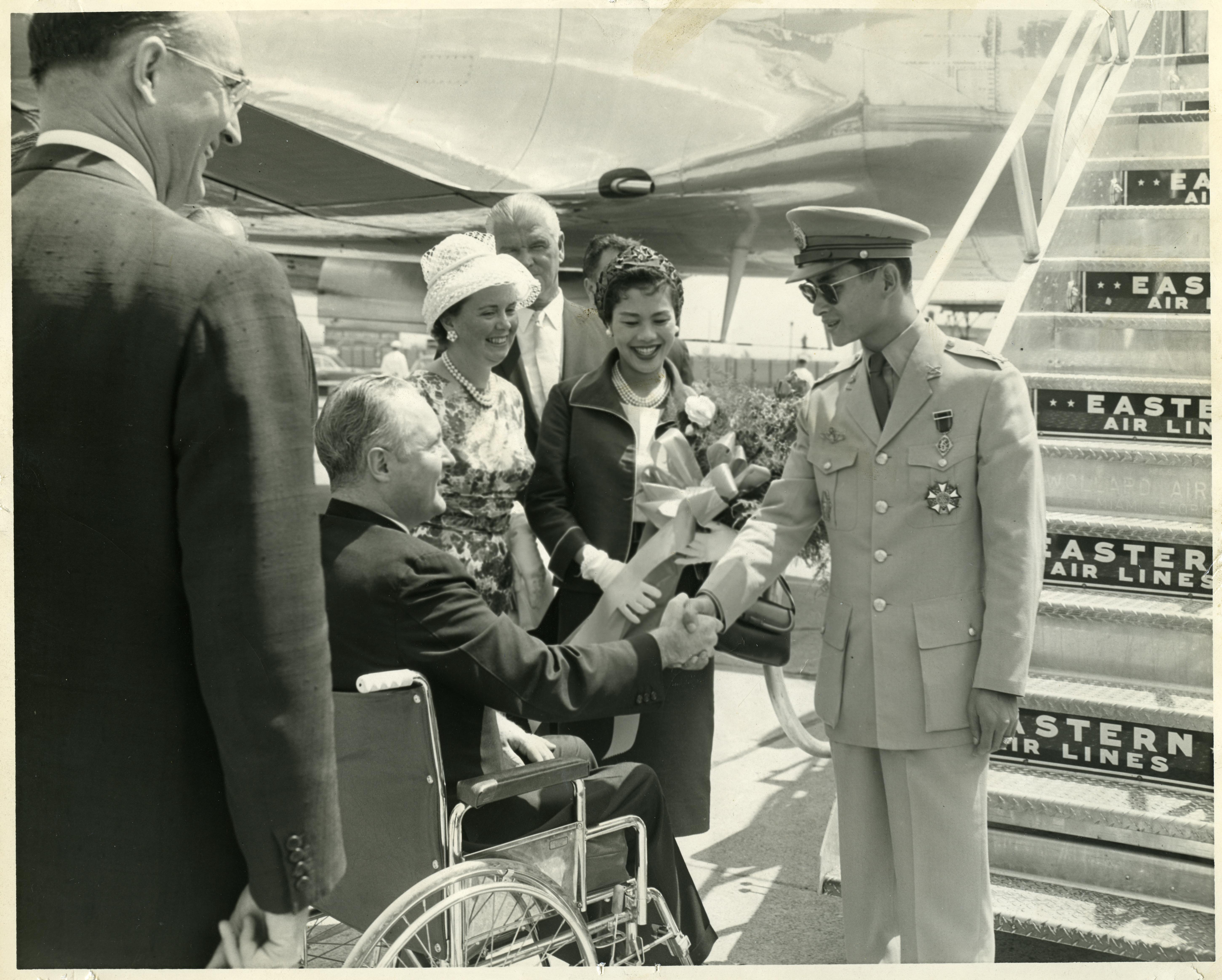
Queen Sirikit during international engagements

When Queen Sirikit accompanied the king in state visits to Europe and the United States in 1960, she noted that there was a need for a modern national costume suitable for formal wear. The queen had research conducted into historical records of royal dresses, and eight official designs were developed and promoted by the queen and her aides. They are known as Chut Thai Ruean-Ton, Chitlada, Amarin, Boromphiman, Chakkri, Dusit, Chakkraphat and Siwalai. Since then, these dresses have come into regular use by the public as well.

=== Chut Thai Chakkri ===
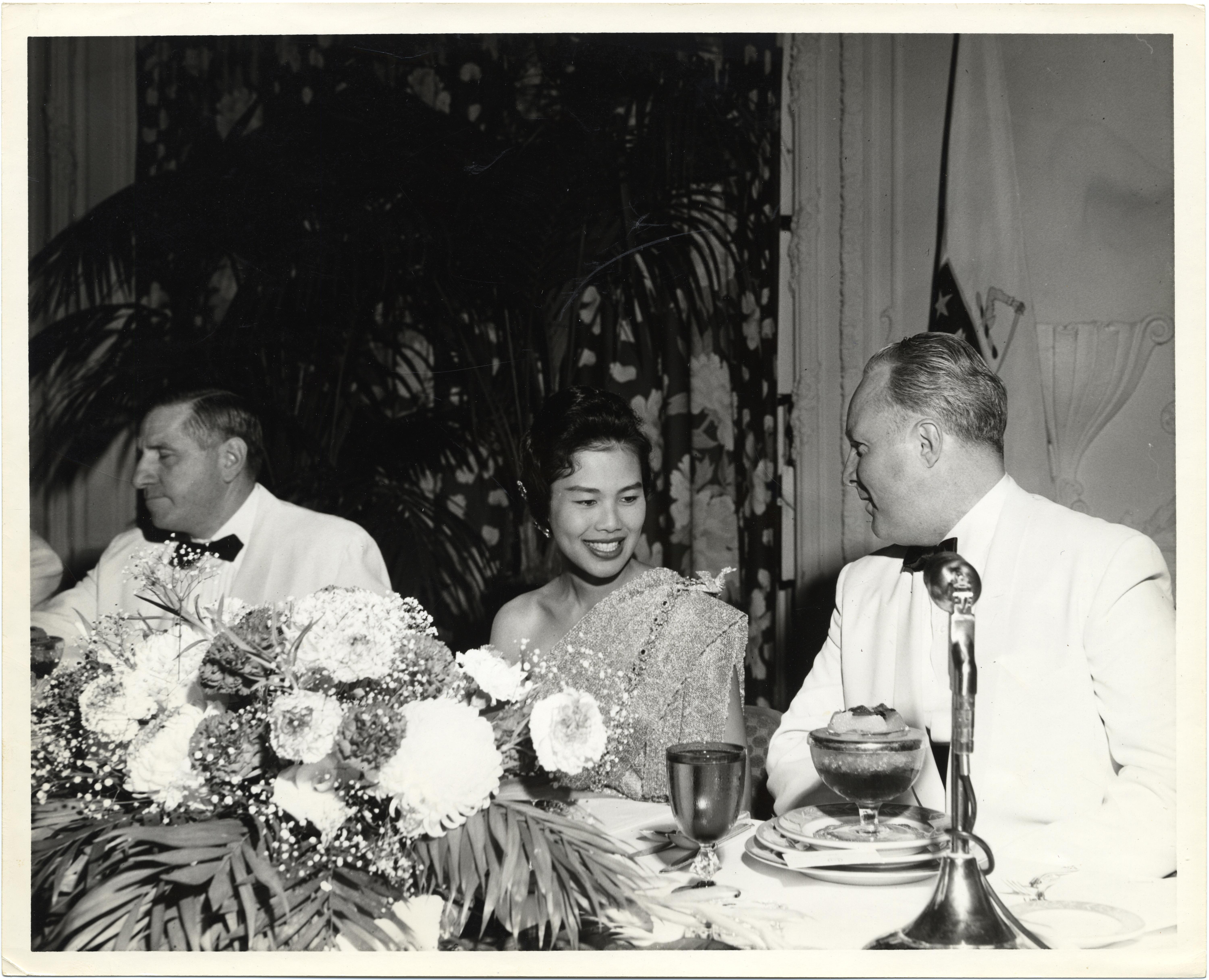
Queen Sirikit of Thailand, and Mayor John F. Collins at the city of Boston, 1960

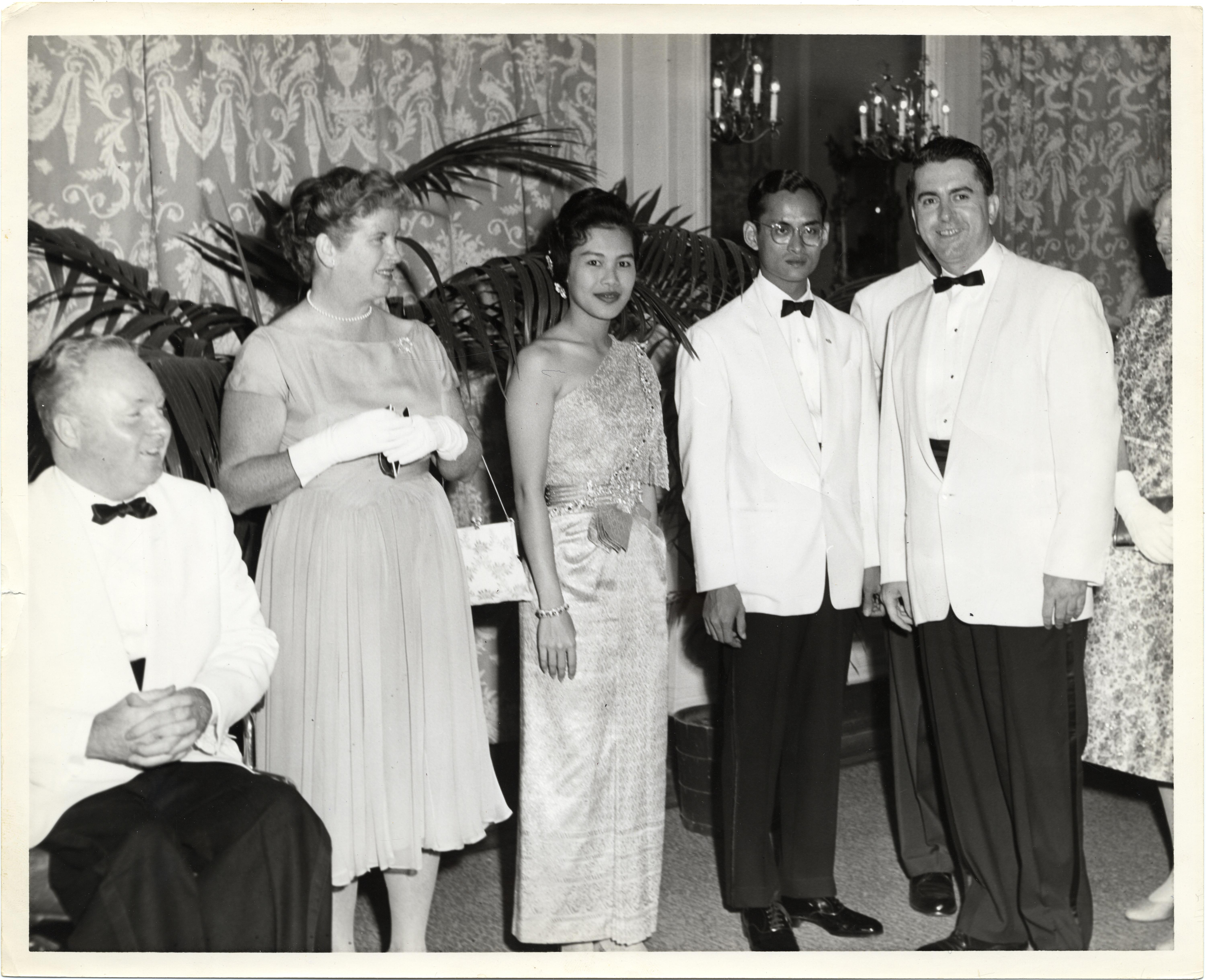
Mayor John F. Collins, Kate Furedo, Queen Sirikit of Thailand and King Bhumibol of Thailand at the city of Boston, 1960

Chut Thai Chakkri (Thai: ชุดไทยจักรี, Thai pronunciation: [tɕʰút.tʰaj.tɕàk.krii]) is formal and elegant wear. The sbai on top, wrapped in the traditional style (draped over one shoulder and leaving the other bare), is produced using a weaving technique called "yok". Yok creates additional thickness within the fabric without adding supplementary threads. Often, a touch of gold or silver-colored threads are added, making the fabric reasonably more expensive. The chut thai is finished with a sinh, a full-length wrap-around skirt with two pleated folds in the front called "na-nang" (Thai: หน้านาง).

=== Chut Thai Boromphiman ===
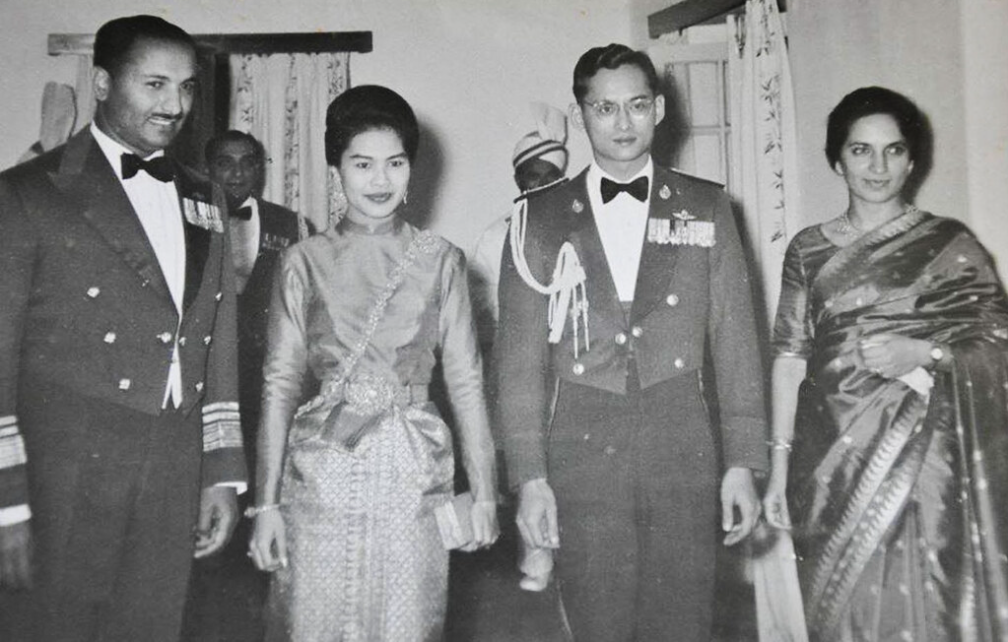
Air Marshal Asghar Khan, Chief Guests Queen Sirikit and King Bhumibol of Thailand, and Khan's wife at a banquet in PAF Officer's Mess Peshawar, 1962

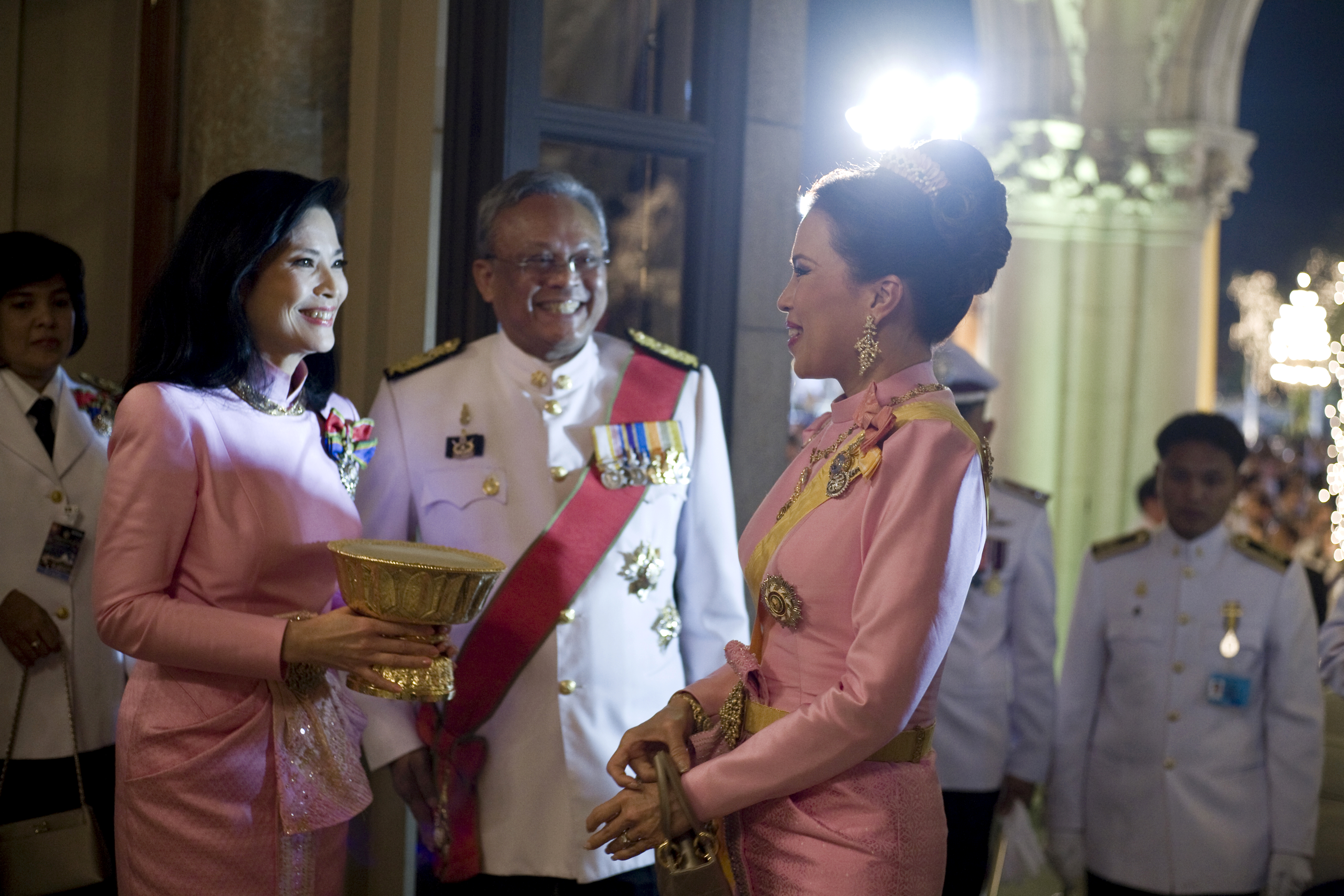
Princess Ubol Ratana at the royal Thai Government House, 2009

Chut Thai Boromphiman (Thai: ชุดไทยบรมพิมาน, Thai pronunciation: [tɕʰút.tʰaj.bɔɔ.rom.pʰí.maan]), also a formal evening costume, comprises a long-sleeved, collared blouse tucked beneath a sinh with its front pleats (na-nang). The sinh length runs about the ankle. The skirt and blouse are sewn together like a one piece dress of which style is suitable for a tall and slender wearer. It can be worn in either formal or semi-formal events such as the League Ceremony or royal functions. Royal decorations are also worn.

=== Chut Thai Dusit ===
Chut Thai Dusit (Thai: ชุดไทยดุสิต, Thai pronunciation: [tɕʰút.tʰaj.dù(ʔ).sìt]) is evening attire, taking the shape of a Western-style sleeveless dress with a wide neckline, made with yok silk or brocade. The sinh-like skirt and top are sewn together so that they form a one-piece dress.

=== Chut Thai Siwalai ===
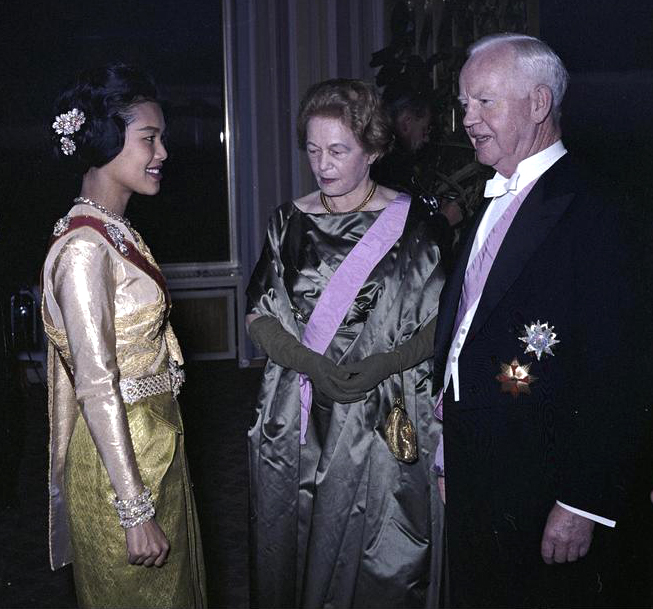
Heinrich Lübke, the Federal President of Germany and his wife, Wilhelmine Lübke, with Queen Sirikit of Thailand in the city of Bonn, 1960

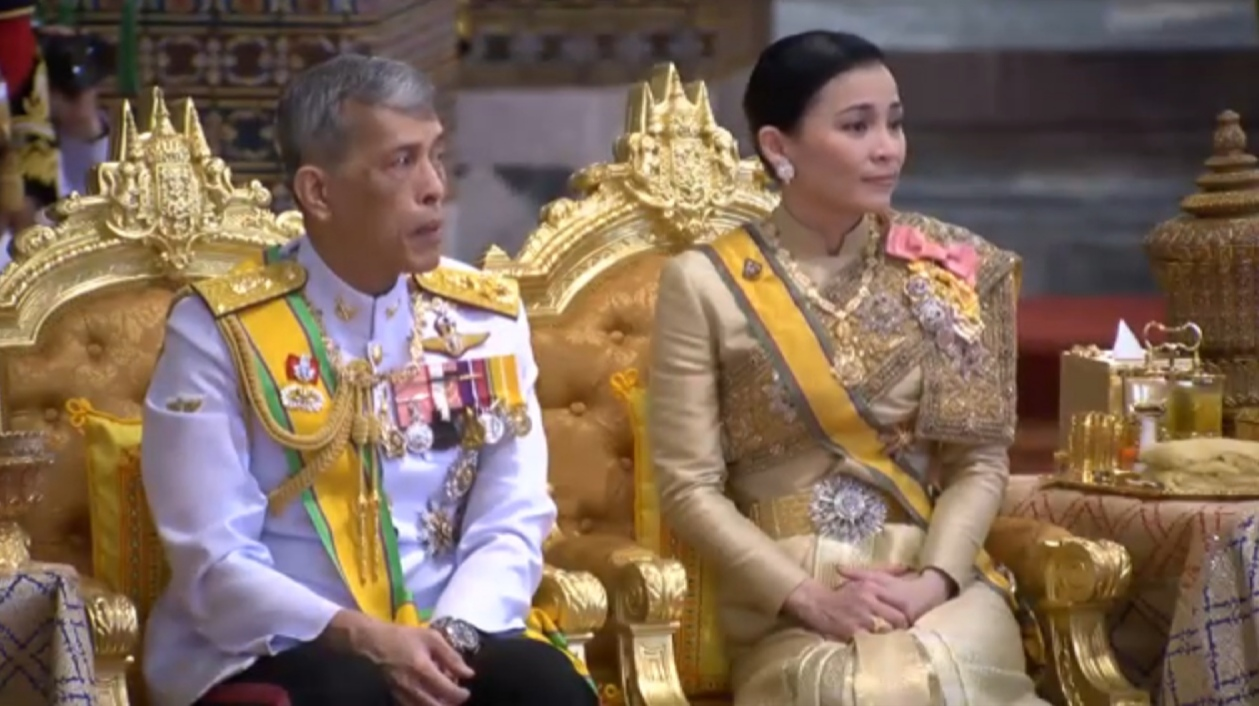
King Vajiralongkorn and Queen Suthida attending the royal ceremony, 2019

Chut Thai Siwalai (Thai: ชุดไทยศิวาลัย, Thai pronunciation: [tɕʰút.tʰaj.sì.waa.laj]), a formal evening chut thai worn for royal ceremonies, is quite similar to Boromphiman, but has an over-shoulder sash resembling a sbai. It is believed that the word "Siwalai" originated from the English word "civilised".

=== Chut Thai Chakkraphat ===
Chut Thai Chakkraphat (also spelled "Jakkraphat"; Thai: ชุดไทยจักรพรรดิ, Thai pronunciation: [tɕʰút.tʰaj.tɕàk.kra.pʰát], lit. "imperial Thai costume") features a traditionally-wrapped sbai like Chakkri, but is thicker with full embroidery on the upper part and a pleated cover. Considered more conservative and formal than Chakkri, the costume can only be worn for very important royal or national ceremonies.

=== Chut Thai Amarin ===
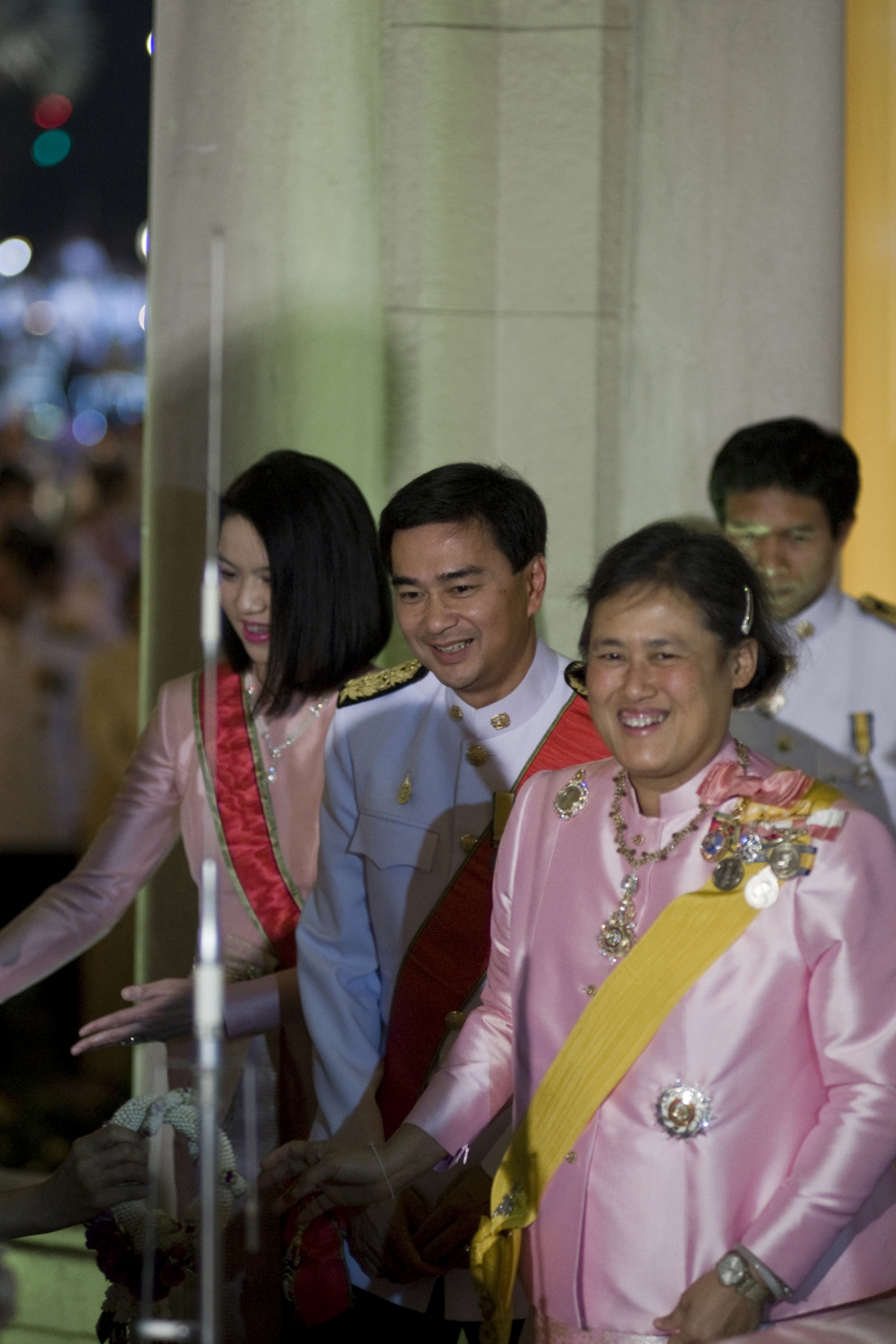
Princess Maha Chakri Sirindhorn at the Royal Thai Government House, 2009

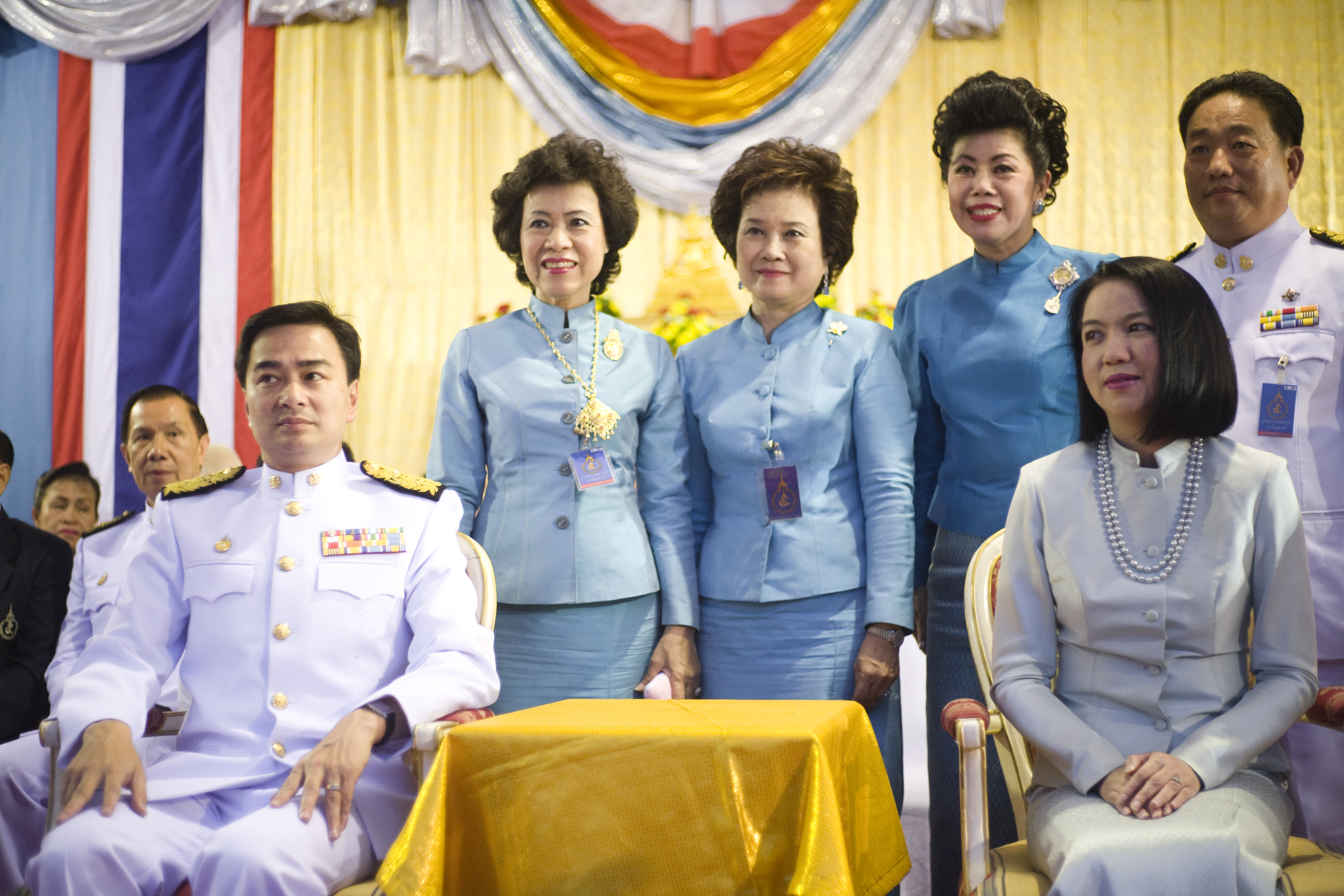
The former Prime Minister presided over the ceremony of offering royal tributes and lighting candles in honor of Her Majesty the Queen’s Birthday Anniversary, 2009

Chut Thai Amarin (Thai: ชุดไทยอมรินทร์, Thai pronunciation: [tɕʰút.tʰaj.ʔam.ma.rin]) is evening attire, made of brocaded fabric. With this style, the wearer does not have to wear a belt. The blouse can be either wide or round-necked. The sleeve length sits just below the elbow. The beauty of this chut thai is its textile and accessories. It can be used for an evening dinner or at the Royal Birthday Procession. The royal decorations are worn.

=== Chut Thai Chitlada ===
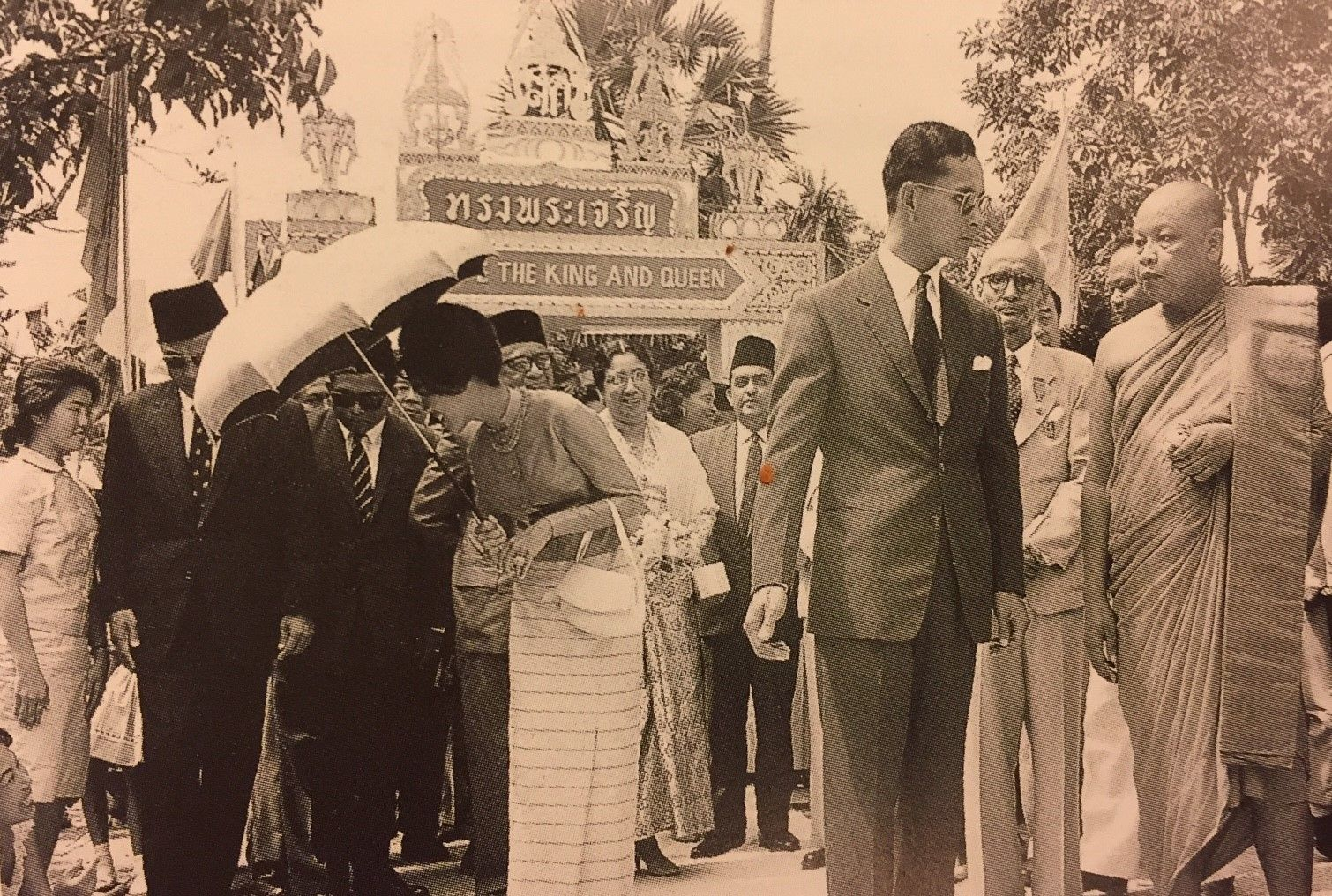
King Bhumibol and Queen Sirikit visiting Wat Chetawan in Petaling Jaya, Federation of Malaya during their state visit, 1962

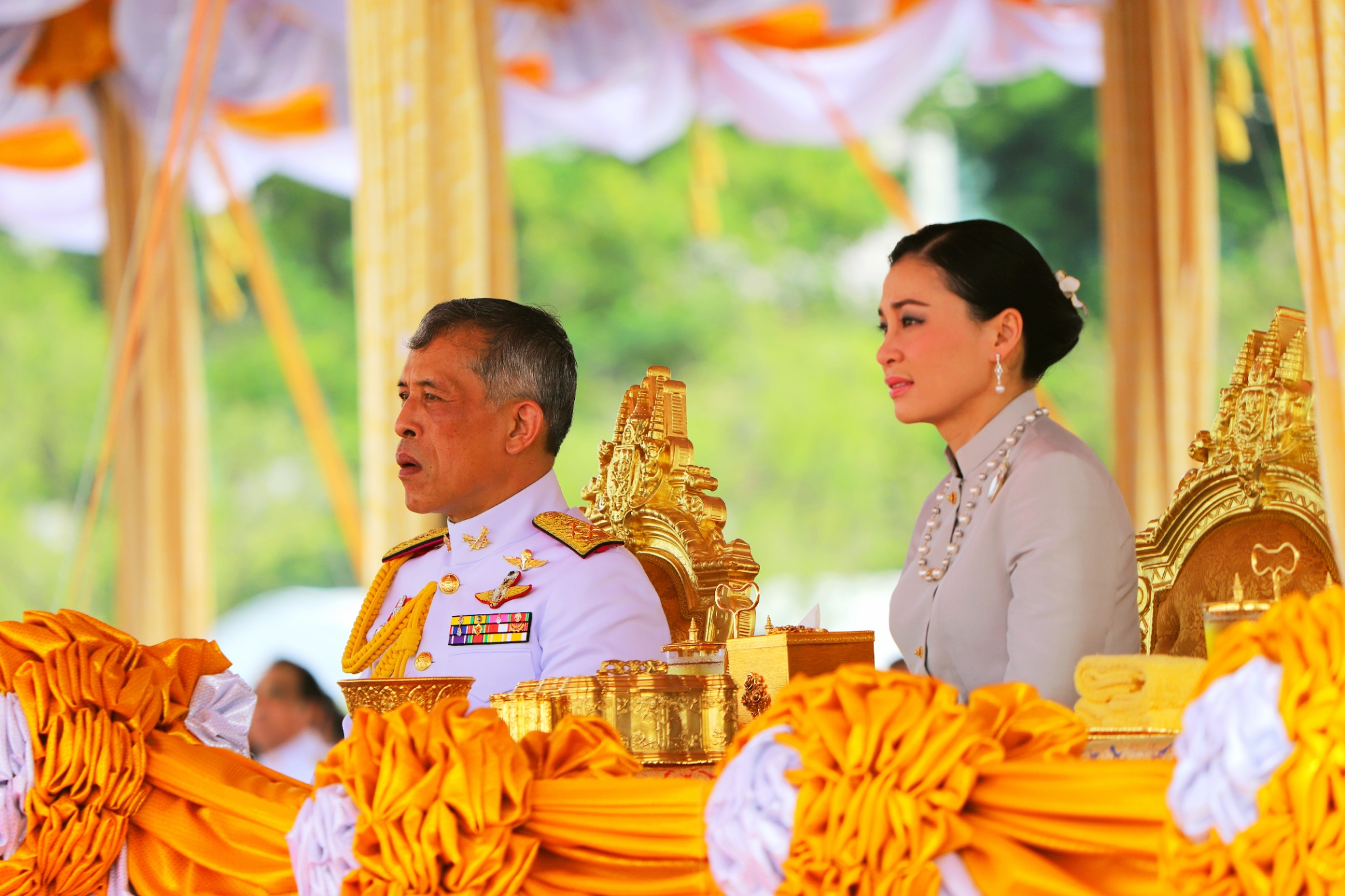
King Vajiralongkorn and Queen Suthida at the royal ploughing ceremony day, 2019

Chut Thai Chitlada (Thai: ชุดไทยจิตรลดา, Thai pronunciation: [tɕʰút.tʰaj.tɕìt.lá.daa]), with its brocaded band at the hem of the sinh, is mainly daytime wear. It can be worn with a long sleeved silk blouse, with the front opening attached with five ornamental silver or gold buttons. The sinh is a casual wraparound. It can be worn to a ceremony that is a not too informal such as welcoming the official royal guests at the airport. Wearers do not need to wear royal decorations but the color and style should be appropriate.

=== Chut Thai Ruean-Ton ===
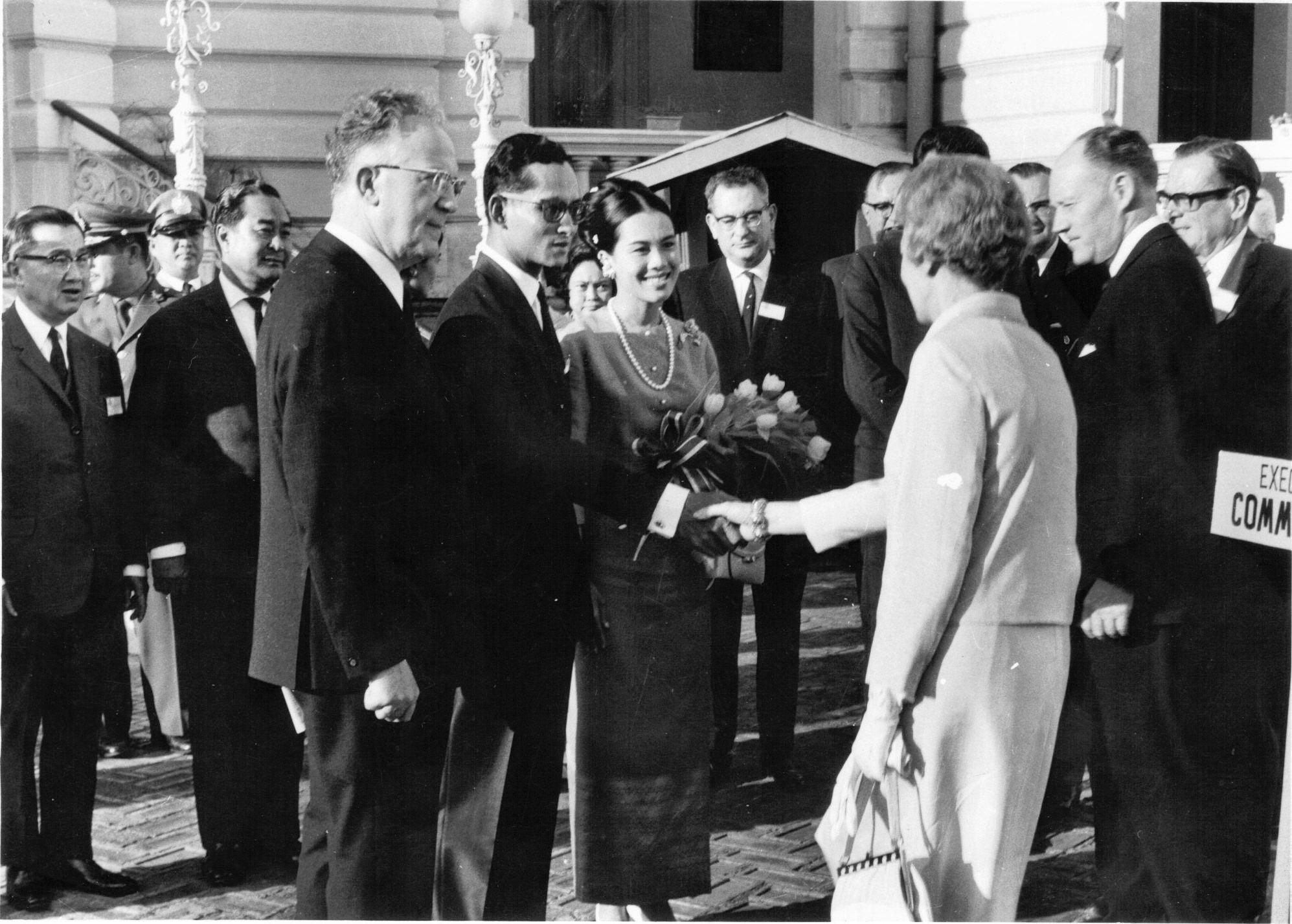
Yitzhak Katz, representing Israel at the YOLA conference with the King and Queen of Thailand in Bangkok, 1966

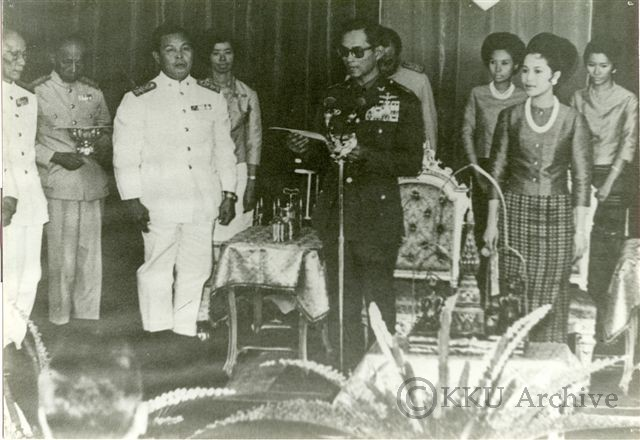
King Bhumibol and Queen Sirikit officially inaugurated Khon Kaen University, 1966

Chut Thai Ruean-Ton (Thai: ชุดไทยเรือนต้น, Thai pronunciation: [tɕʰút.tʰaj.rɯan.tôn]) is the most casual of all outfits. It comprises a horizontally or vertically striped silk or plain-coloured sinh with a patterned band at the tin sinh, or hem, sometimes folded to one side. The collarless blouse that goes with it is separated from the ankle-length skirt. The sleeves are elbow length, and the blouse has a front opening. It is suitable for casual and non-official functions, such as Buddhist festivals.

== Gallery ==
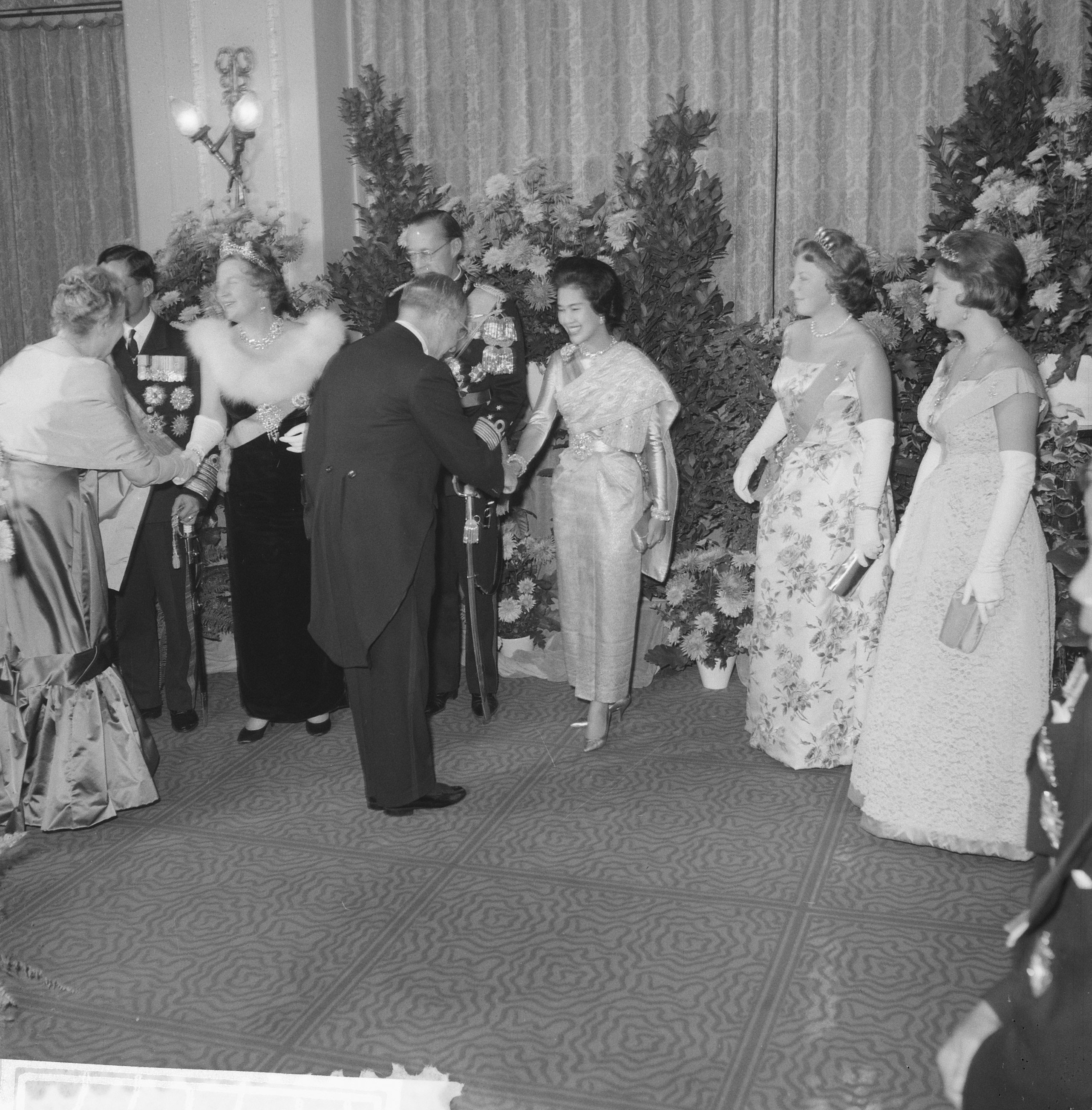
The Dutch royal family host King Bhumibol Adulyadej and Queen Sirikit of Thailand on their State Visit to The Netherlands, 1960

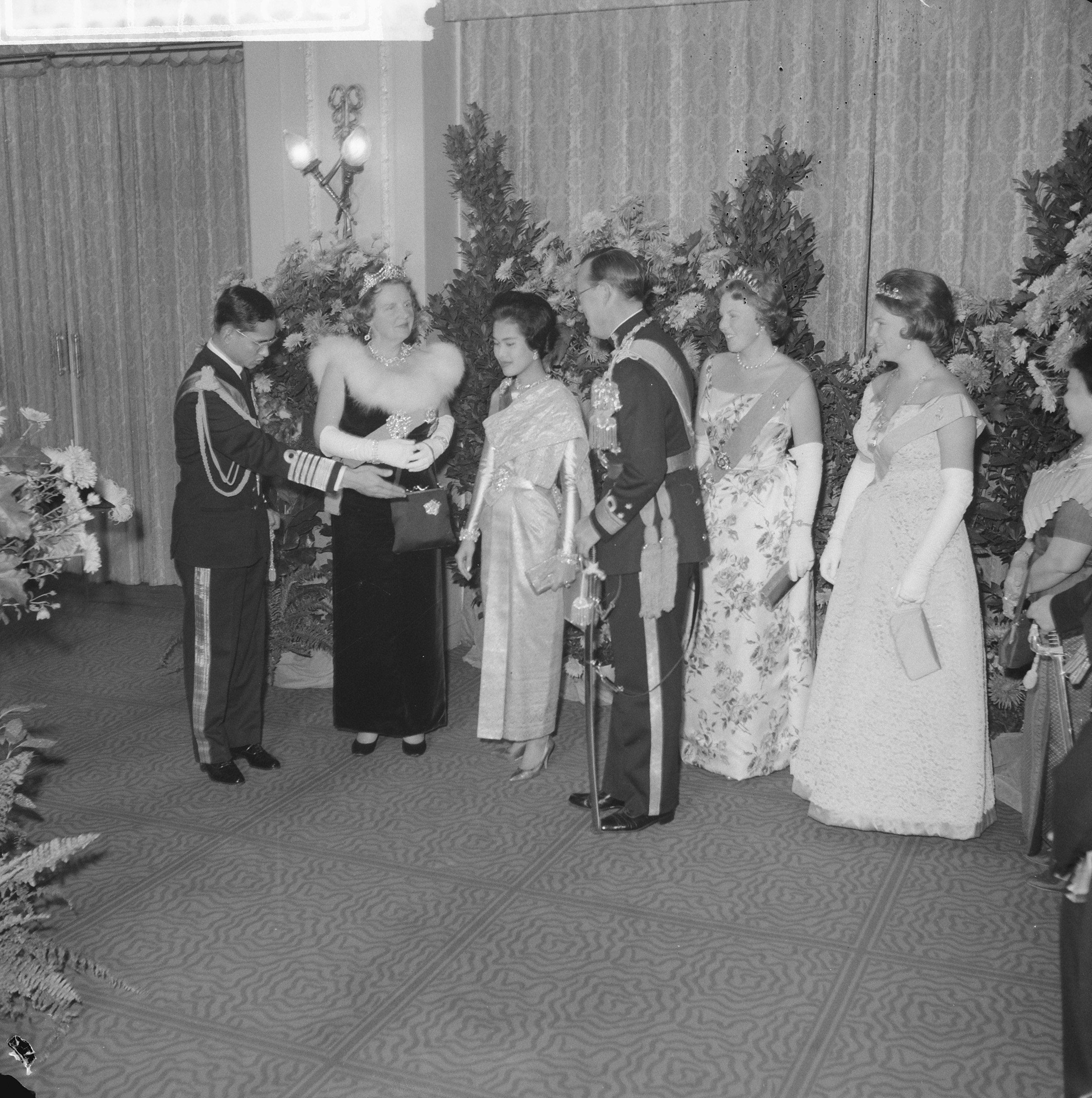
The Dutch royal family host King Bhumibol Adulyadej and Queen Sirikit of Thailand on their State Visit to The Netherlands, 1960

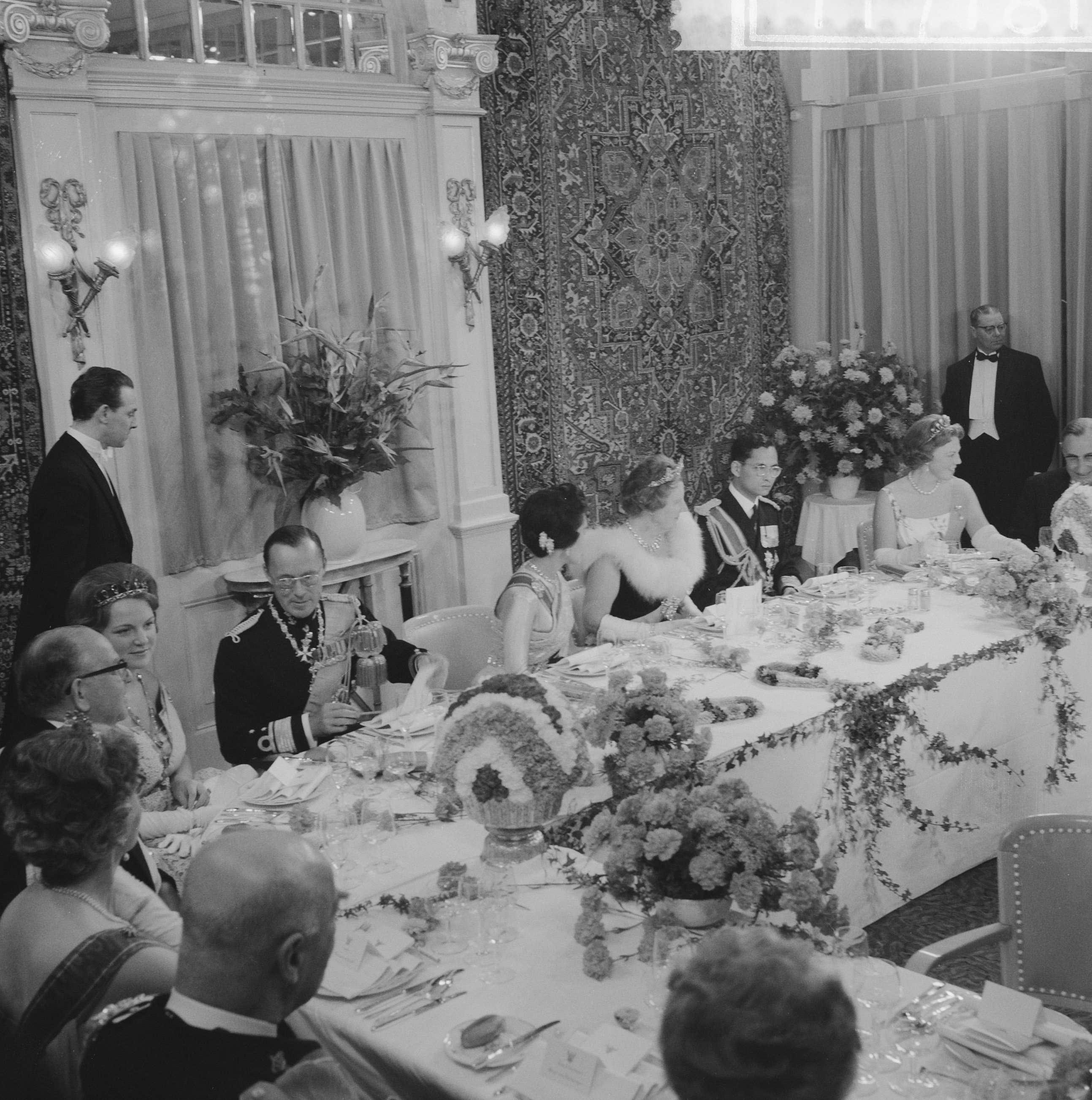
Gala dinner during the visit of the Thai royal family in the Netherlands, 1960

== See also ==
- Chong kraben
- Chud thai
- Raj pattern
- Sbai
- Phanung
- Sinh
- Xout lao
