= Xout lao =

Laotian national costume

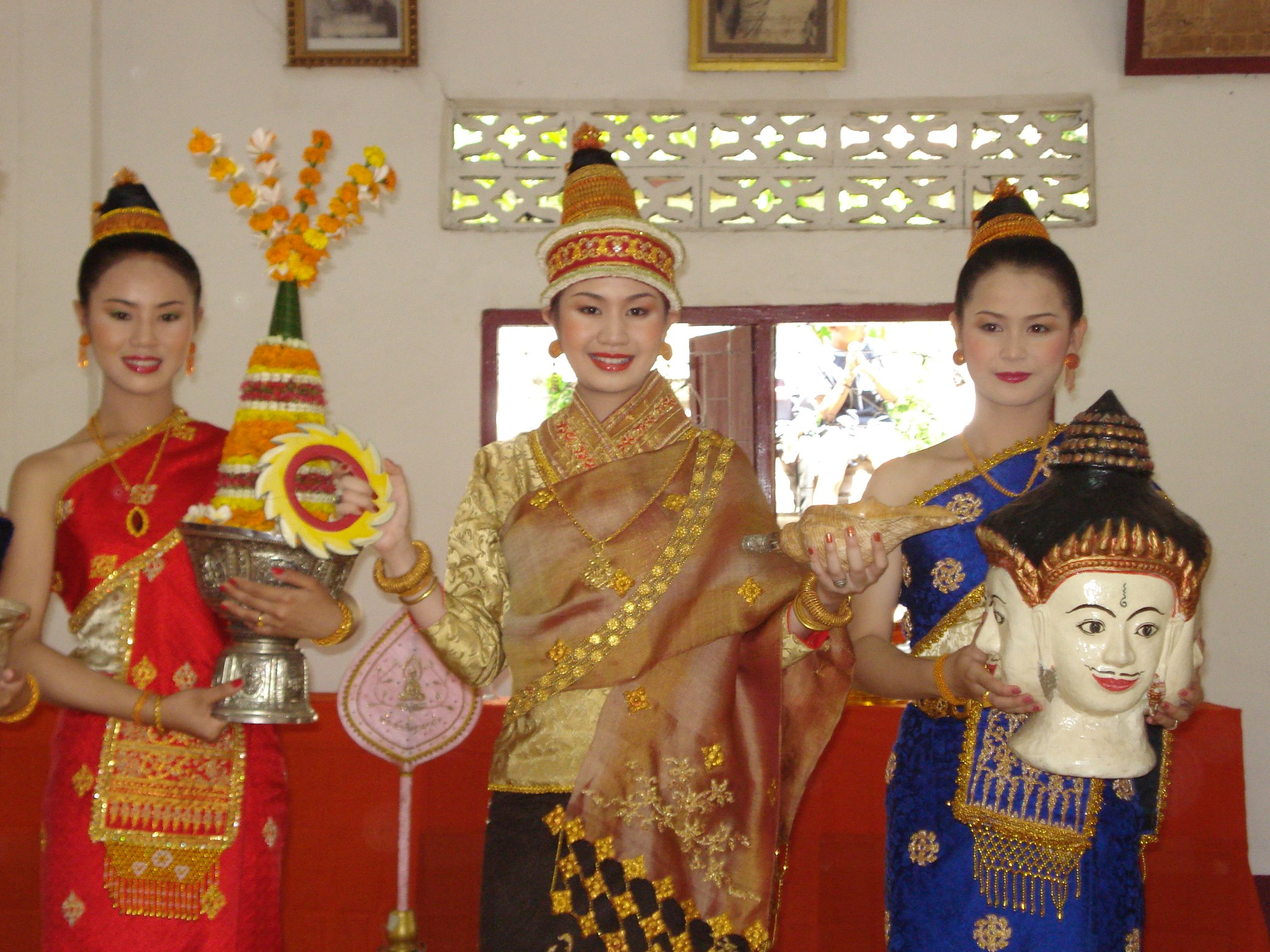
Laotian women wearing xout lao.

The Xout Lao (Lao: ຊຸດລາວ; pronounced [sūt láːw]) is a Laotian national costume, worn by men, women, and children. Xout lao literally means 'Lao outfit'.

== Components ==
Xout Lao is composed of different parts. The style varies between genders from regions to regions, and it often depends on the occasions. For instance, in formal settings men typically wear a white silk Nehru-style jacket with a pha hang with white knee-length socks and dress shoes. Men can also optionally wear a pha biang with checkered patterns on their left shoulders. Women typically wear a sinh matching in colors with a pha biang and a silk suea pat.

== See also ==
- Sinh
- Pha biang
- Suea pat
- Chut thai
- Raj pattern
- Pha hang
