= Sinh (clothing) =

Thailand clothing

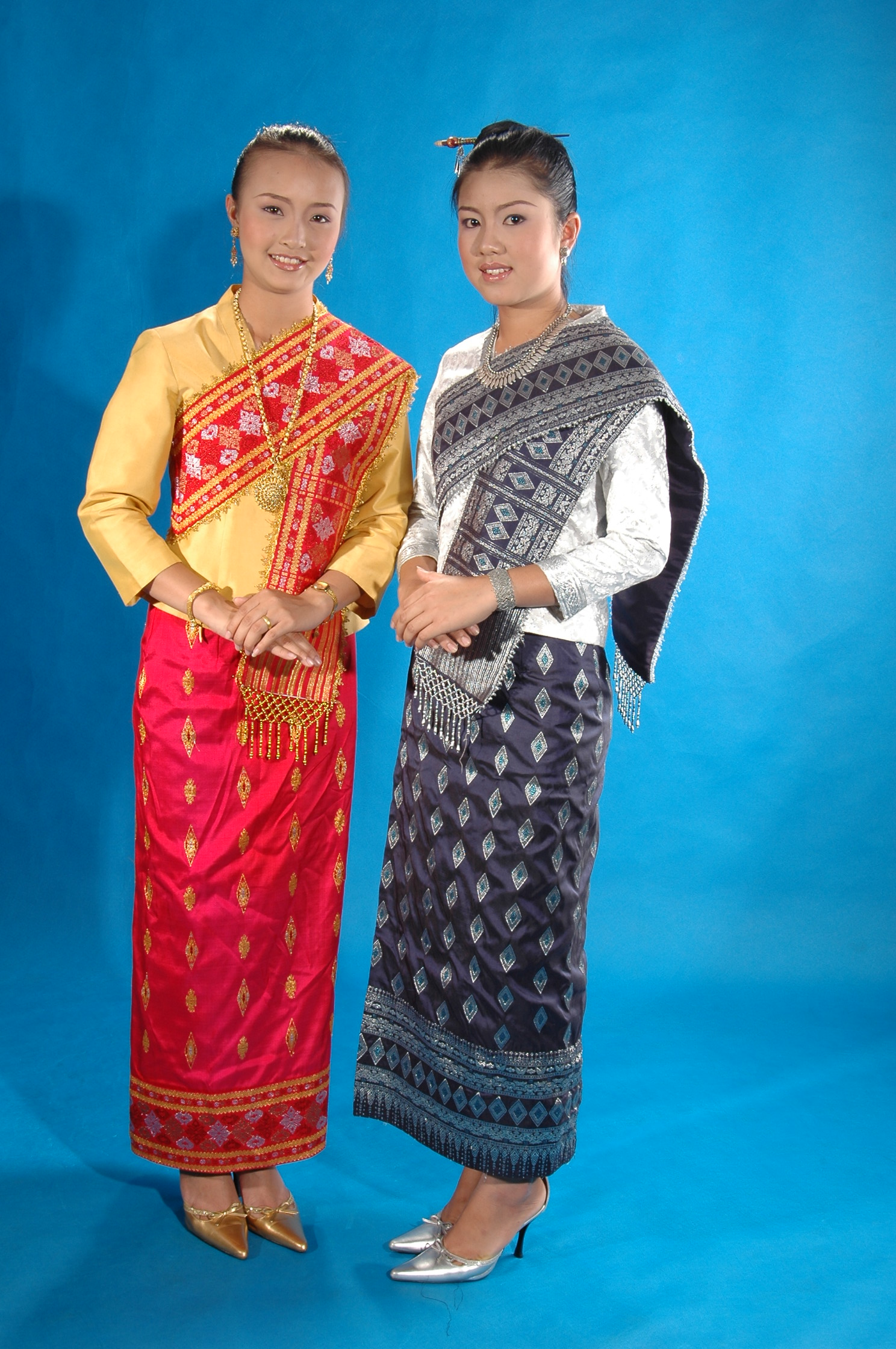
Laotian women wearing sinhs

The Sinh (Lao: ສິ້ນ, [sȉn]; Thai: ซิ่น, RTGS: sin, [sîn]; Tai Nuea: ᥔᥤᥢᥲ; Northeastern Thai: สิ้น, [sìn]), or commonly (Thai: ผ้าซิ่น, RTGS: pha sin), is a handmade traditional skirt, often made of silk, worn by Lao women and Thai women, particularly northern Thai and northeastern Thai women. It is a tube skirt. Its pattern can indicate which region the wearer is from. In present-day Thailand, pha sins are typically worn at special events. However, in Laos, Sinhs are worn more regularly in daily life.

== Components ==
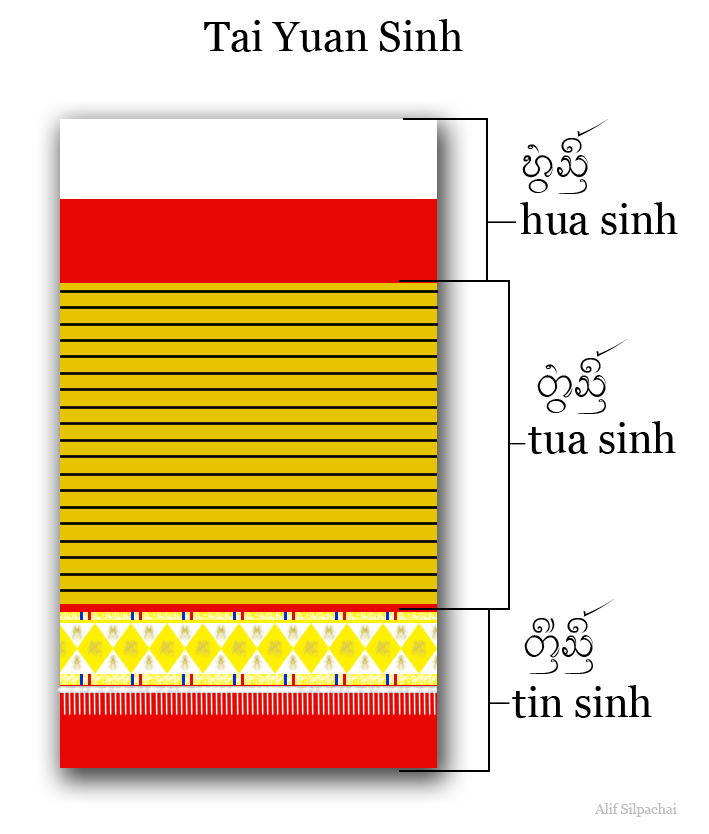
A typical Tai Yuan sinh.

A sinh is typically composed of three components:

- hua sinh (Lao: ຫົວສິ້ນ), literally 'the head of the sinh', is the waistband portion, which is typically tucked in and hidden.
- phuen sinh (Lao: ພື້ນສິ້ນ) or tua sinh (Thai: ตัวซิ่น), literally 'the body of the sinh', is the body of the sinh. This part of the sinh is typically not detailed. In particular, it typically only consists of one or two colors.
- tin sinh (Lao: ຕີນສິ້ນ), literally 'the foot of the sinh', is the hem. The hem is typically woven with a lot of details. The specific details of the hem can indicate where the sinh is made.

== Textiles ==
The sinh is made of silk or handwoven cotton. They come in different textures and designs, frequently created in rural areas. Premium silk versions may go for over 50,000 baht per piece, particularly if created by a well-known traditional weaver. Less expensive fabrics cost about 3,000 baht.

== Gallery ==
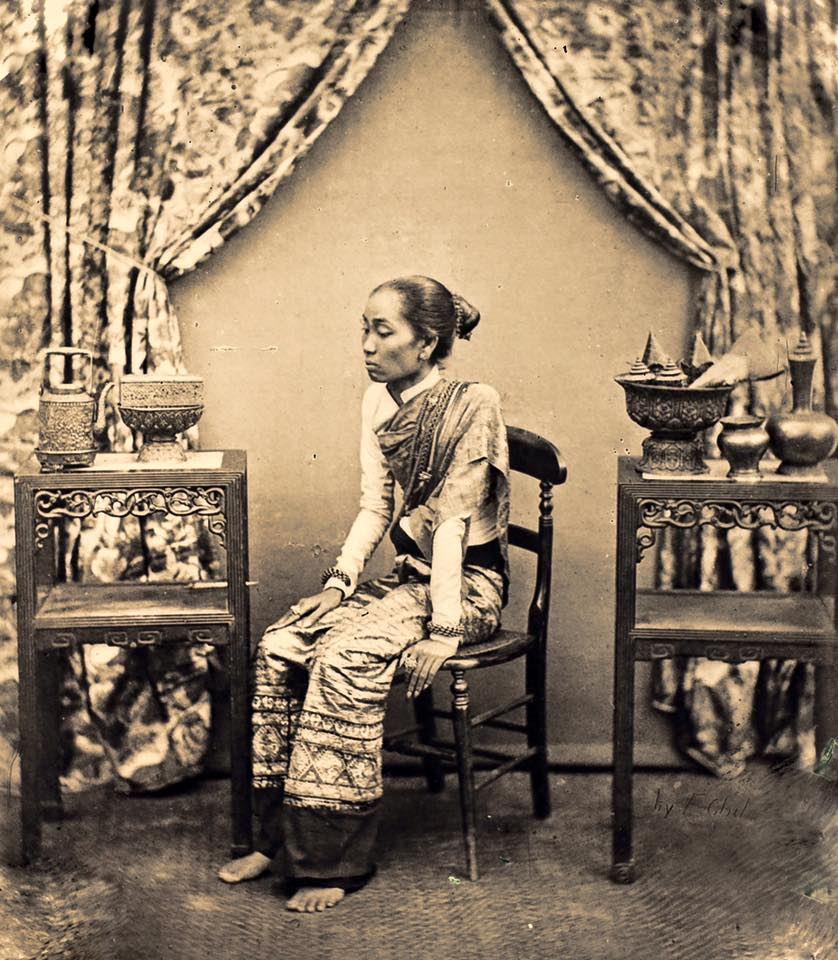
Princess Thip Keson (or Thep Kraison), Princess of Chiang Mai, consort of Inthawichayanon of Chiang Mai and mother of Dara Rasmi wearing sinh and pha biang, before 1884

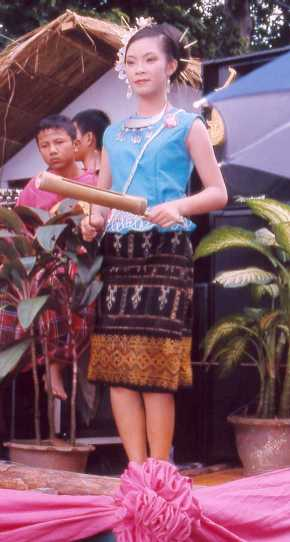
Thai girl wearing Isan style sinh

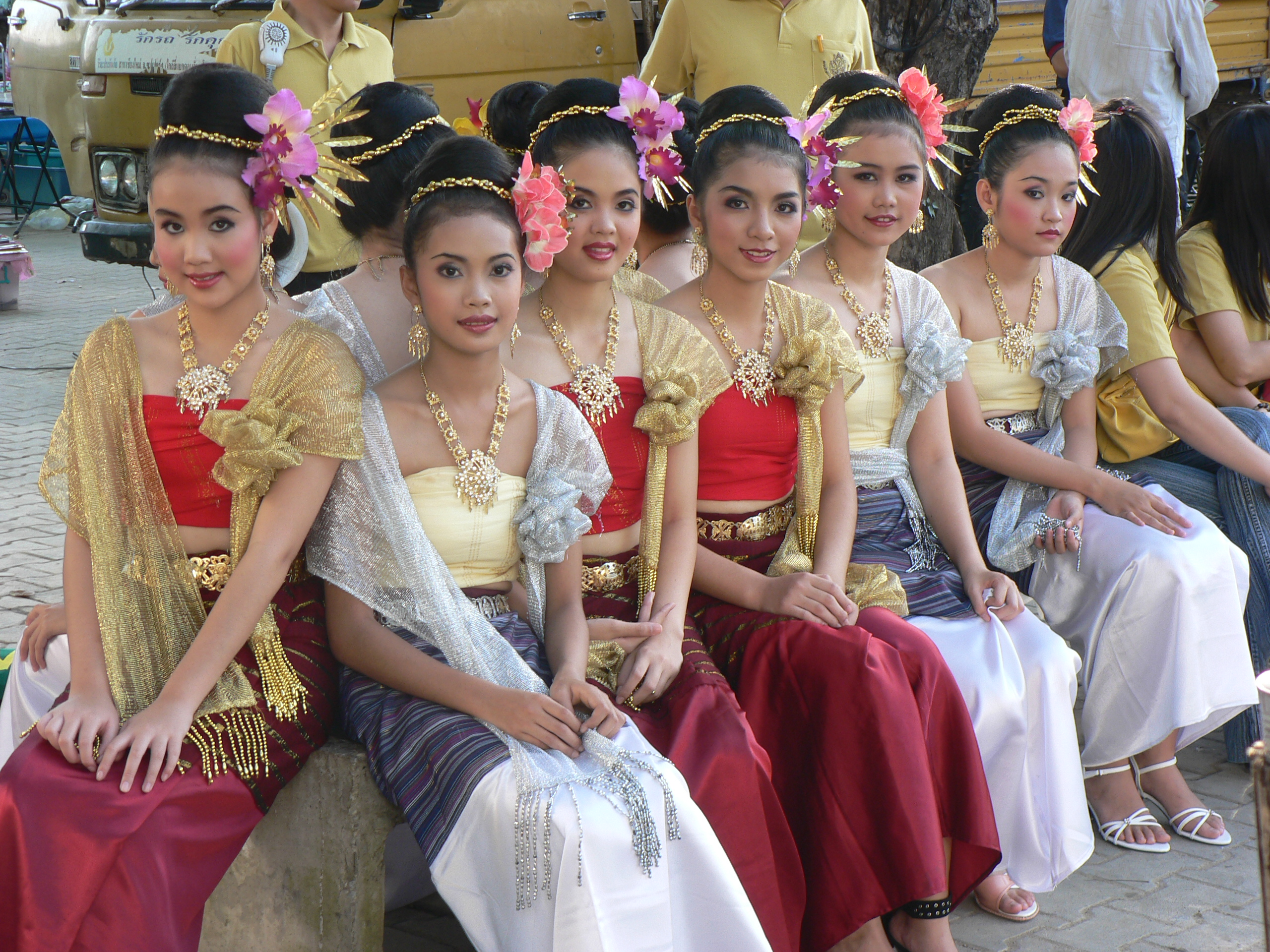
Thai girls wearing northern Thai sinhs

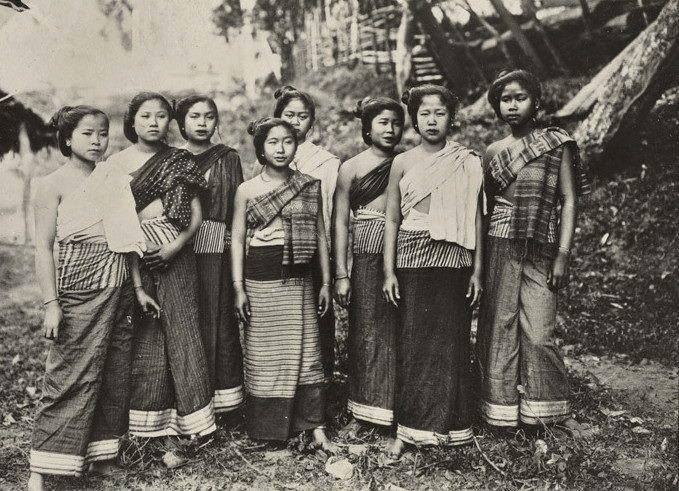
Lao women wearing sinhs

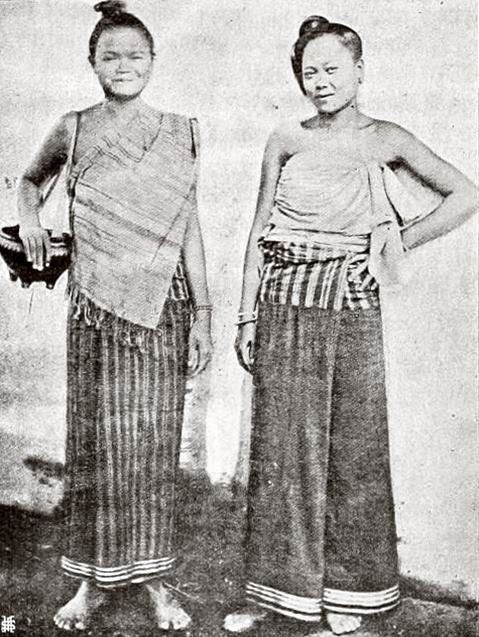
Lao women wearing sinhs

== See also ==
- Dhoti
- Panung
- Xout lao
- Traditional Thai clothing
