= Panung =

Traditional Thai garment

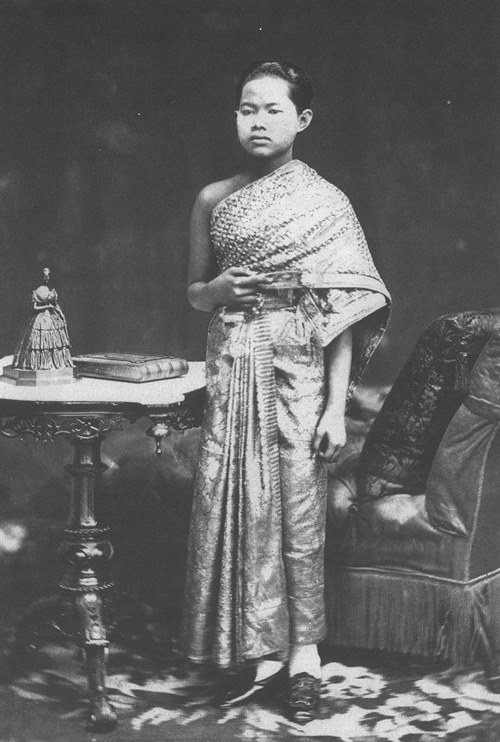
Queen Sunandha, one of the four consorts of King Chulalongkorn wearing pha nung and pha biang

The panung or pha nung (Thai: ผ้านุ่ง, RTGS: pha nung, pronounced [pʰâː nûŋ]) is a lower attire worn by individuals from Siam.

== Style ==
Panung is a traditional garment worn in Thailand. It is a long strip of cloth, described in 1921 by the US vice-consul as "a piece of cotton cloth 3 by 10 feet" is wrapped around the waist, reaching below the knees. The cloth is sometimes passed between the legs and tucked at the back in a fashion known as chong kraben. The garment is normally paired with a sabai or pha hom, a similar cloth used to cover the upper body.

== Variations ==
Panung is a versatile garment that can be worn by anyone, regardless of gender. It is available in different qualities, with first quality being Patta. Patta is a durable printed cloth that features bold check patterns or with cross designed patterns. It is possible for this item to have one or more stripes at either end. The second quality is Papoon, characterized by fast coloration and the narrow stripes woven into the cloth. It is also woven with a two-and-two checking pattern. The third quality is known as Palai, which refers to proper sizing of materials and a stiffened structure.

Contemporary Western clothing is moving away from the traditional Panung style of dressing.

== Images ==
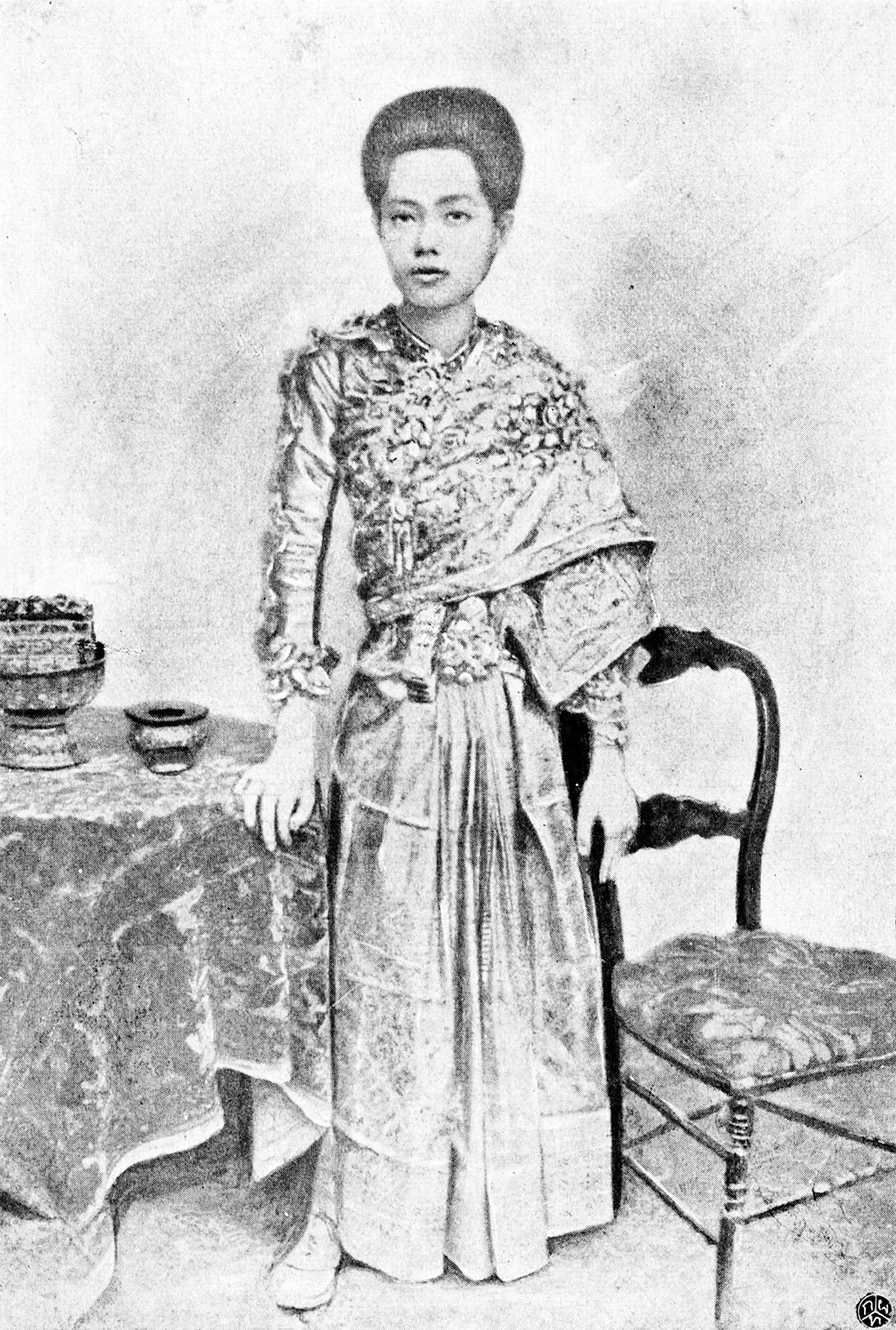
Princess Voralaksanavadi, a daughter of King Chulalongkorn (Rama V) wearing pha nung and pha biang, 1926

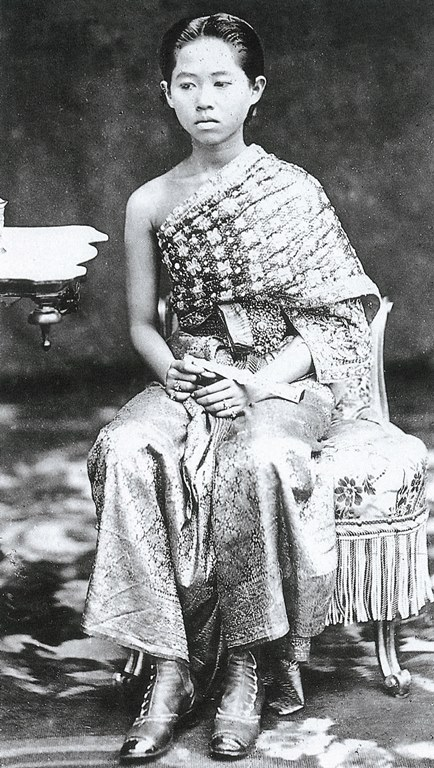
Princess Nariratana, was the daughter of King Mongkut (Rama IV) wearing pha nung and pha biang

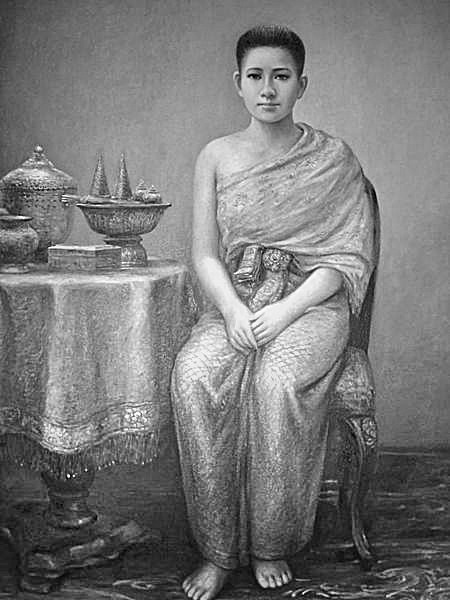
Queen Somanass Waddhanawathy, a first queen of King Mongkut (Rama IV) wearing pha nung and pha biang

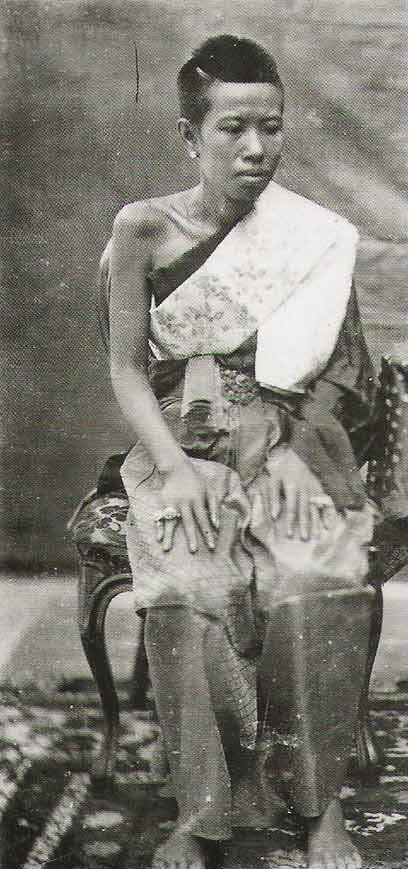
Tieng Rojanadis, was a consort of King Mongkut (Rama IV) wearing pha nung and pha biang

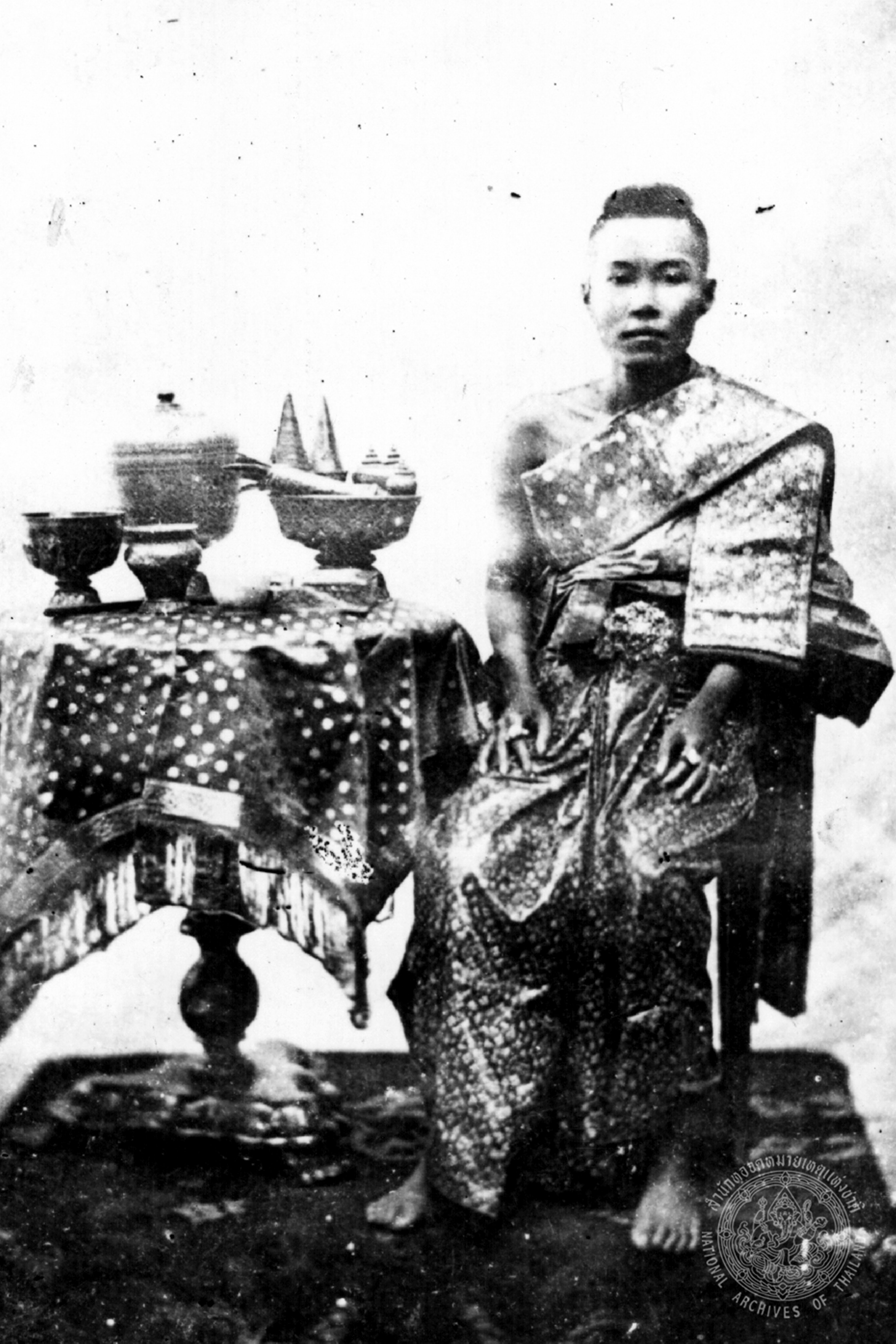
Queen Debsirindra, the second consort of King Mongkut wearing pha nung and pha biang, 1855

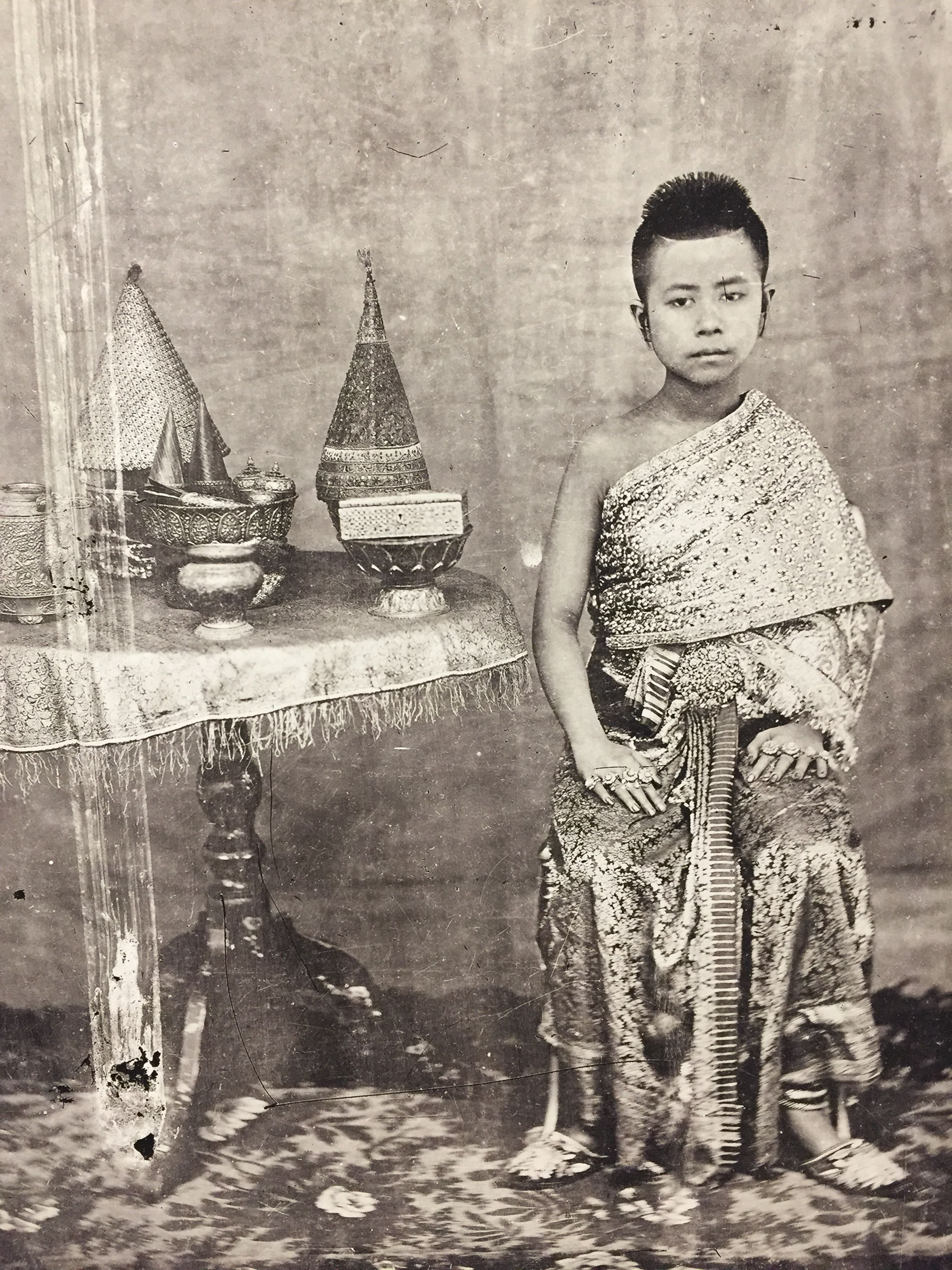
Princess Ying Yaowalak Akkharatchasuda (1851–1886), was the daughter of King Mongkut wearing pha nung and pha biang

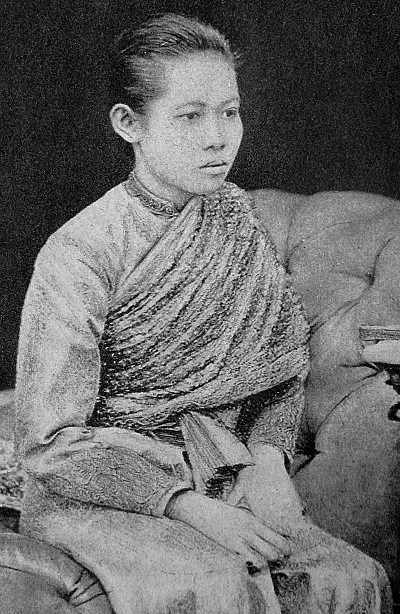
Queen Savang Vadhana, a consort of King Chulalongkorn (Rama V) wearing pha nung and pha biang, in 1879

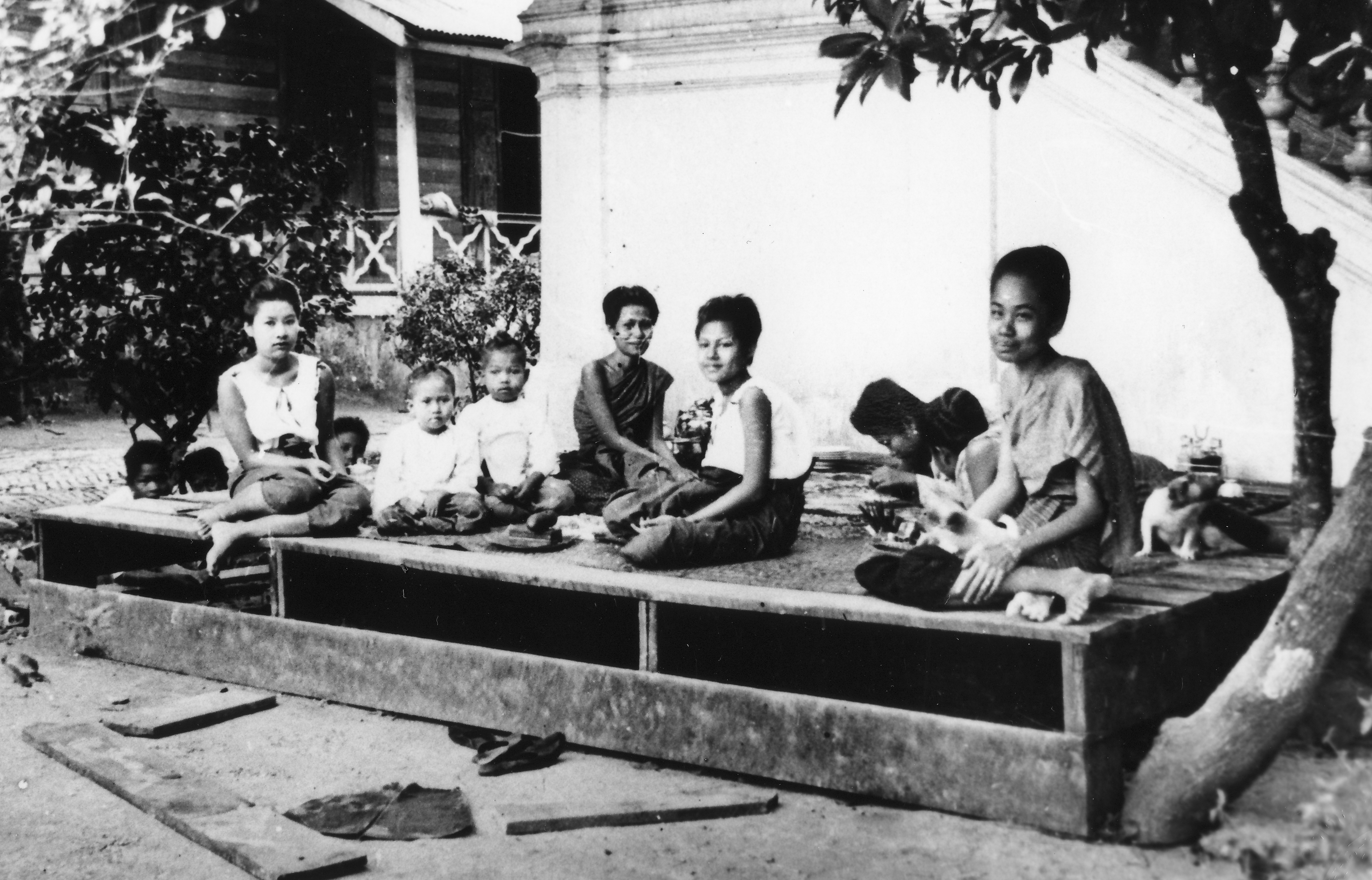
Princess Dara Rasmi, a princess of Chiang Mai wearing pha nung and pha biang at Dusit Palace, 1909

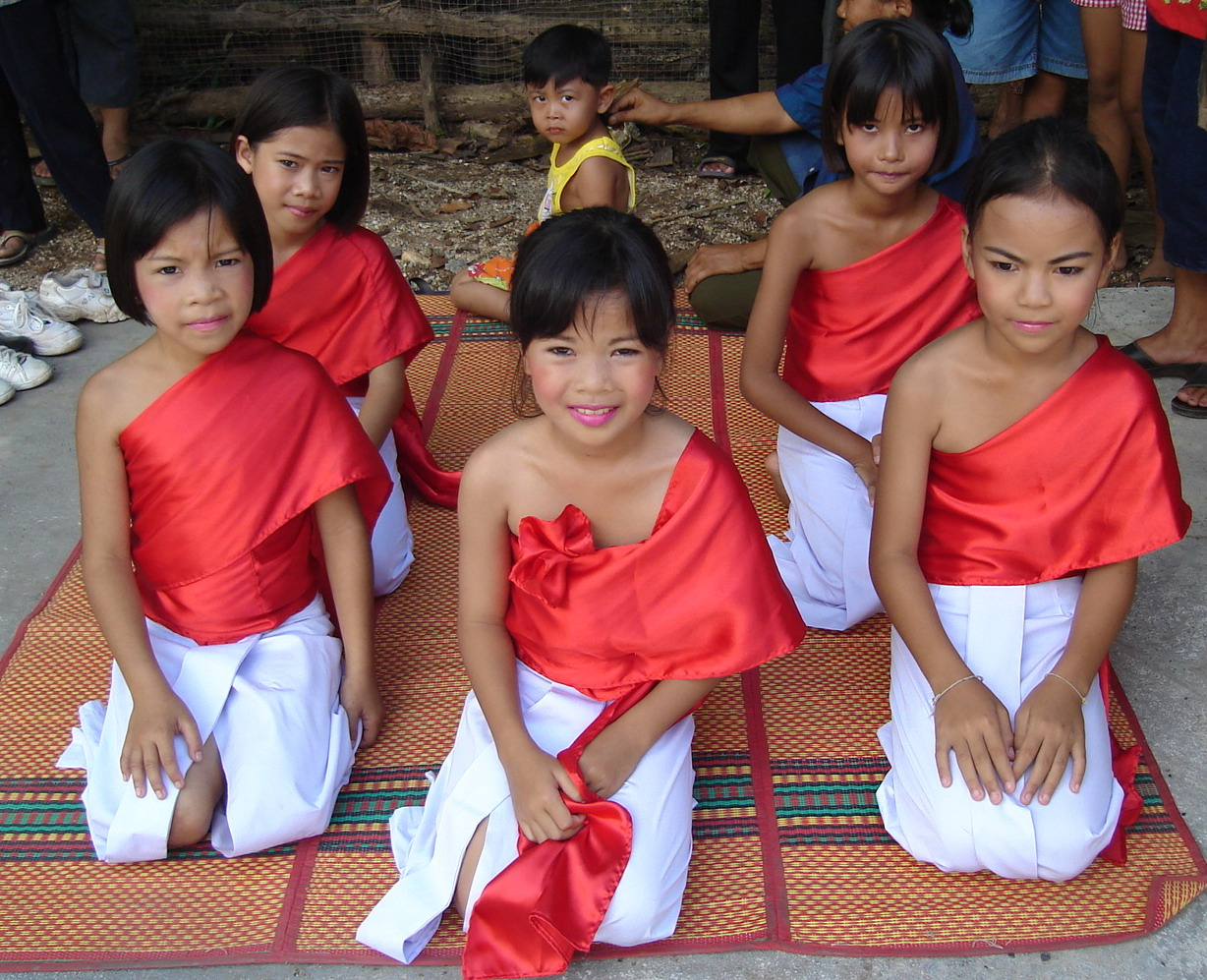
Thai children wearing pha nung and pha biang

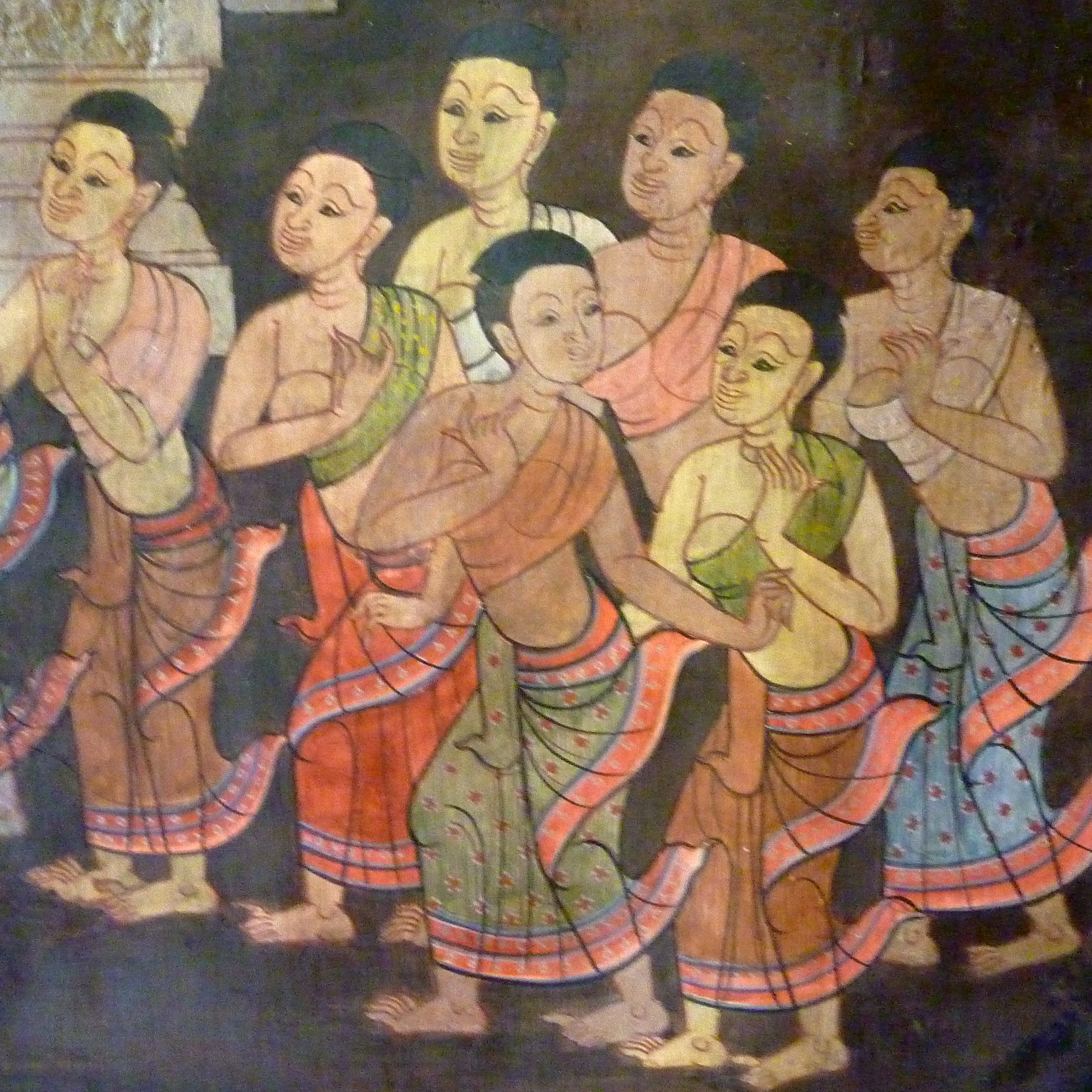
Painting of Siamese women wearing pha nung and pha biang in Wat Pho, Bangkok

== See also ==
- Dhoti
- Sinh (clothing)
