= Sbai =

Silk or brocade wrap or shoulder cloth worn by women in Cambodia, Thailand, and Laos

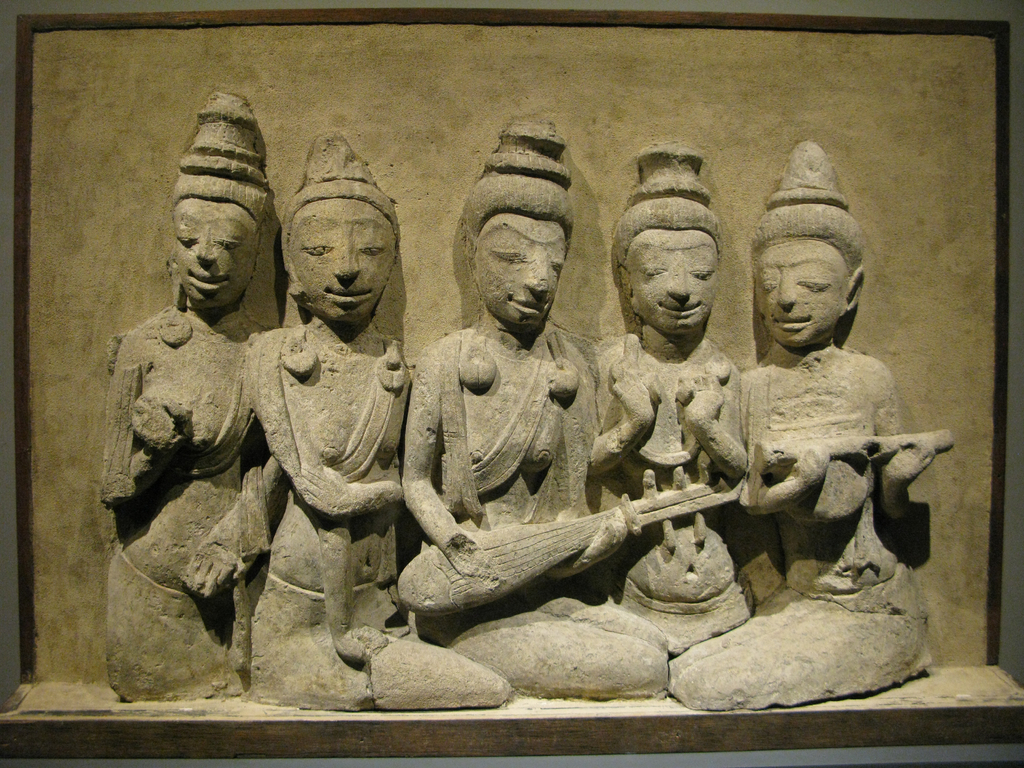
The stucco relief discovered at the Khu Bua archaeological site, which dates back to the 650-700 C.E. period of the Dvaravati culture, depicts four female figures wearing shawl-like garments.

Sbai (Khmer: ស្បៃ [sɓaj]; Lao: ສະໄບ [sā.bàj]; Malay: Sebai; Jawi: سباي; Thai: สไบ, RTGS: sabai [sā.bāj]) or phaa biang (Lao: ຜ້າບ່ຽງ [pʰȁː bīaŋ]; Thai: ผ้าเบี่ยง [pʰâː bìaŋ]) is a shawl-like garment worn by women in Cambodia, Laos, and Thailand to cover the breasts, while in Sumatra, Borneo and the Malay Peninsula, the same term is used to describe a cloth hanging from the shoulders. The sbai was derived from the Indian sari, the end of which is worn over one shoulder.

== Etymology ==
The term sbai is the contracted form of vowels which has its ultimately original roots from the Austronesian term *cahebay, which was diversified as the first exodus in Taiwan as the Formosan term *sapay from south China between 5,000–4,500 BCE, and the second exodus to the Philippines, Indonesia, and others occurred around 3,000–2,000 BCE.

Its vowel sequence was contracted from south China to the first exodus: *cahebay→*cahbay→*cahpay→*sapay (meaning: 'to hang'). According to the Proto-Austronesian Phonology of Cornell University Southeast Asia Program (SEAP), there is the diversity of the term *cahebay or *sapay into subgroups of other languages families as follows:

- Austroasiatic languages: *lɓak (Dvaravati Old Mon and Nyah Kur), cambāy (Middle Mon), *jbaay (Mon), *sapay→sĕbai, sbai→sbāy, spai→spiey or *sapay→spai→spiey (Old Khmer and Modern Khmer), phìai (Kuy).
- Austronesian languages: *cahebay→łahpay, cahfay, cabfay. (Proto-Austronesian).
- Formosan languages: *sapay→sapai (Puyuma).
- Indo-European languages: *səmpay (Sangsari).
- Kra–Dai languages: *sapay→sĕbai, sbai→sabai, saphaay (Thai).
- Malayo-Polynesian languages: *sapay→sbai, sĕbai, sampai (Malay), sampai (Indonesian), sampay, sampayan (Sundanese), sampay, sampayán (Tagalog), sampe (Makassarese, Serayar), sambay, sablay (Maranao), sumpáy (Ratahan), hafe-hafe (Tondarno), cave- (Filipinno), sappɛ (Buginese), sappɛ-sappɛ (Toba Batak), sampay-an (Ngaju), sampe-lao (Muna), sampi, mi-sampy, sampazana (Malagasy), sambay (Maranao).
- Indo-European languages: spāy (unverified Sanskrit religious vocabulary as assumed by French.) from the Sanskrit of Khmer inscription on the Tāmrakumbha Indian brass water jug (K.669C Line 18) aged 972 CE at Preah Vihear.
- Dravidian languages: calvai, cālvai, sālvai, sâlvai (Tamil), from Modern Persian šāl or Urdu and Persian chal, shal, shàl.

== History ==
Sbai is derived from the Indian sari, which may have been introduced to Southeast Asia through the Indianized Kingdoms, the most notable being Funan, Srivijaya, and the Khmer Empire, which spread clothing and other traditions and elements of Indian culture.

=== Cambodia ===
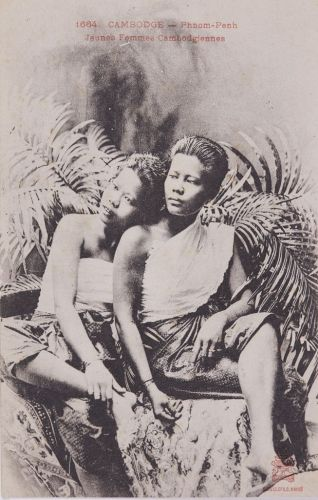
Khmer sbai: Khmer women in Phnom Penh, late 1800s.

Khmer sbai: More Khmer patterns/motifs.

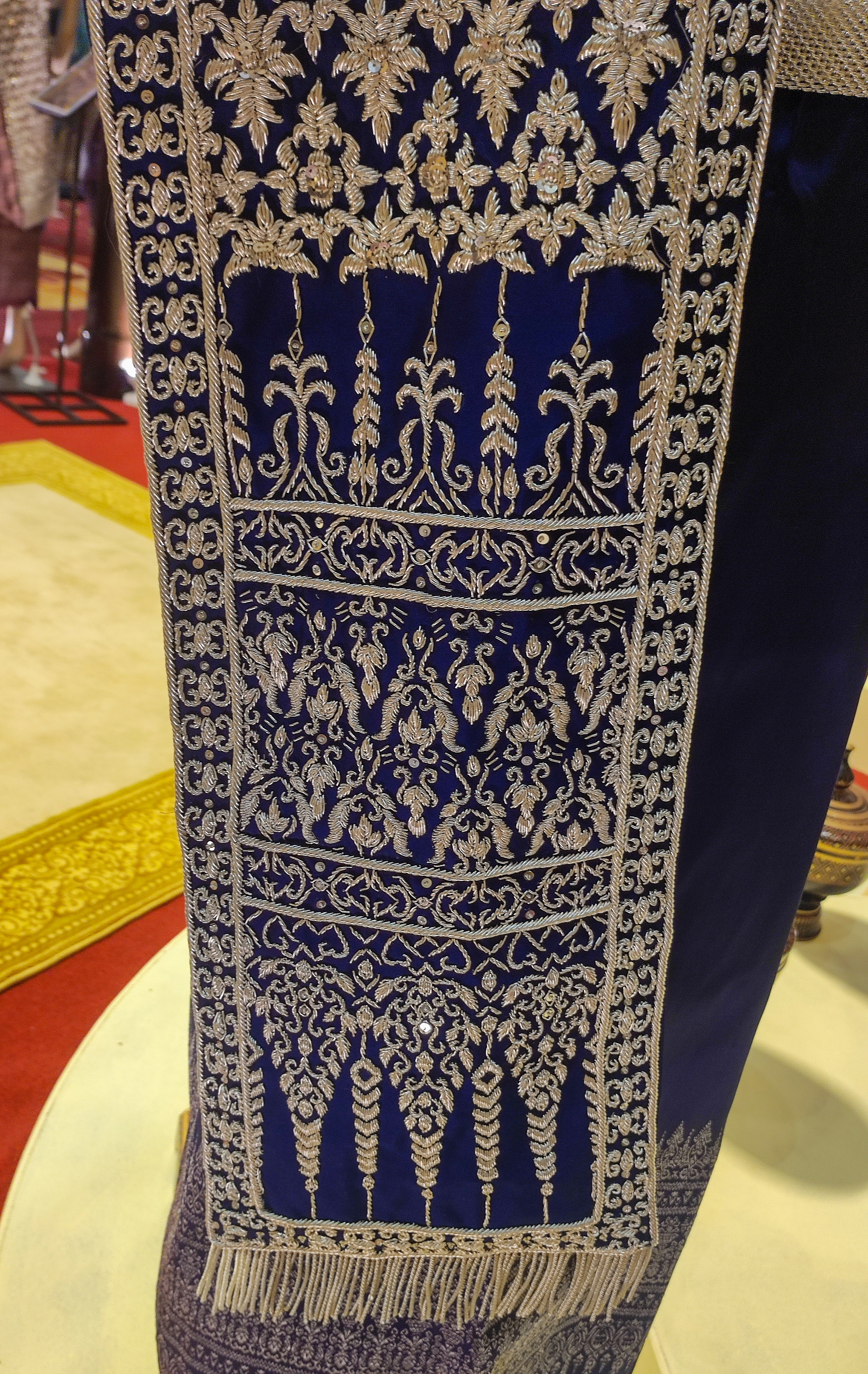
Khmer sbai: Another design and pattern.

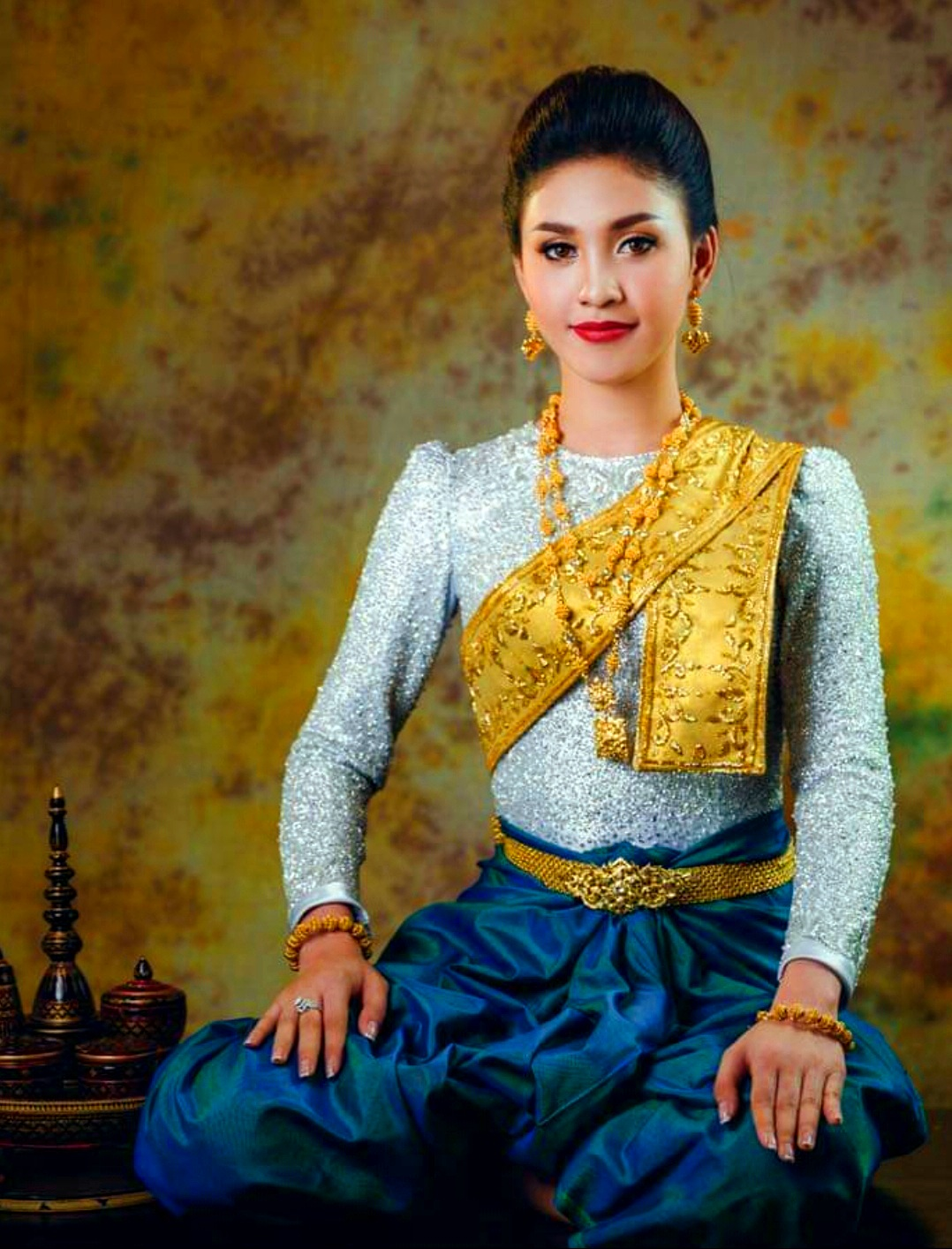
Khmer sbai: modern short, narrow sbai.

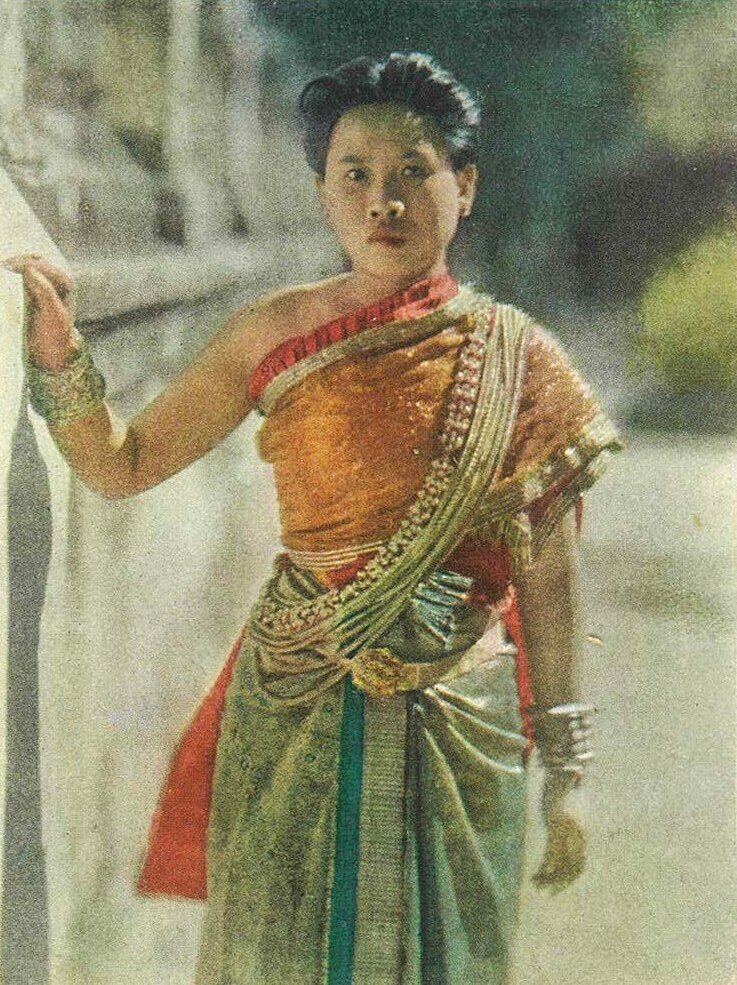
Khmer sbai: bride in long, wide sbai, Phnom Penh, 1927.

In Khmer, the sbai (ស្បៃ) refers to an asymmetrical breast-sash, usually embroidered and of silk, worn for ballet performances and ceremonies. Chinese chronicles relay from the founding legend of Neang Neak and Preah Thong that the latter was unhappy with Neang Neak's nudity and he "folded a piece of material to make a garment through which he had her pass her head." Scholar and ballet teacher Prumsodun Ok writes that this describes how one wears a pre-sewn sbai.

The sbai is used in traditional Khmer weddings during the rite of Preah Thong Taong Sbai Neang Neak ("Preah Thong holding on to the sbai of Neang Neak"), which represents the legend of the foundation of the Khmer people: groom carries the bride's sbai from behind for a ritualistic walk to "symbolize their entering into her naga realm." At Angkor Wat, there are 12th century depictions of topless devatas (Khmer: tevoda ទេវតា) holding a sbai connected to their sampot, while the northern wall of Angkor Wat depicts a 16th-century group of Theravada Buddhist ladies wearing long sbai while holding various offerings.

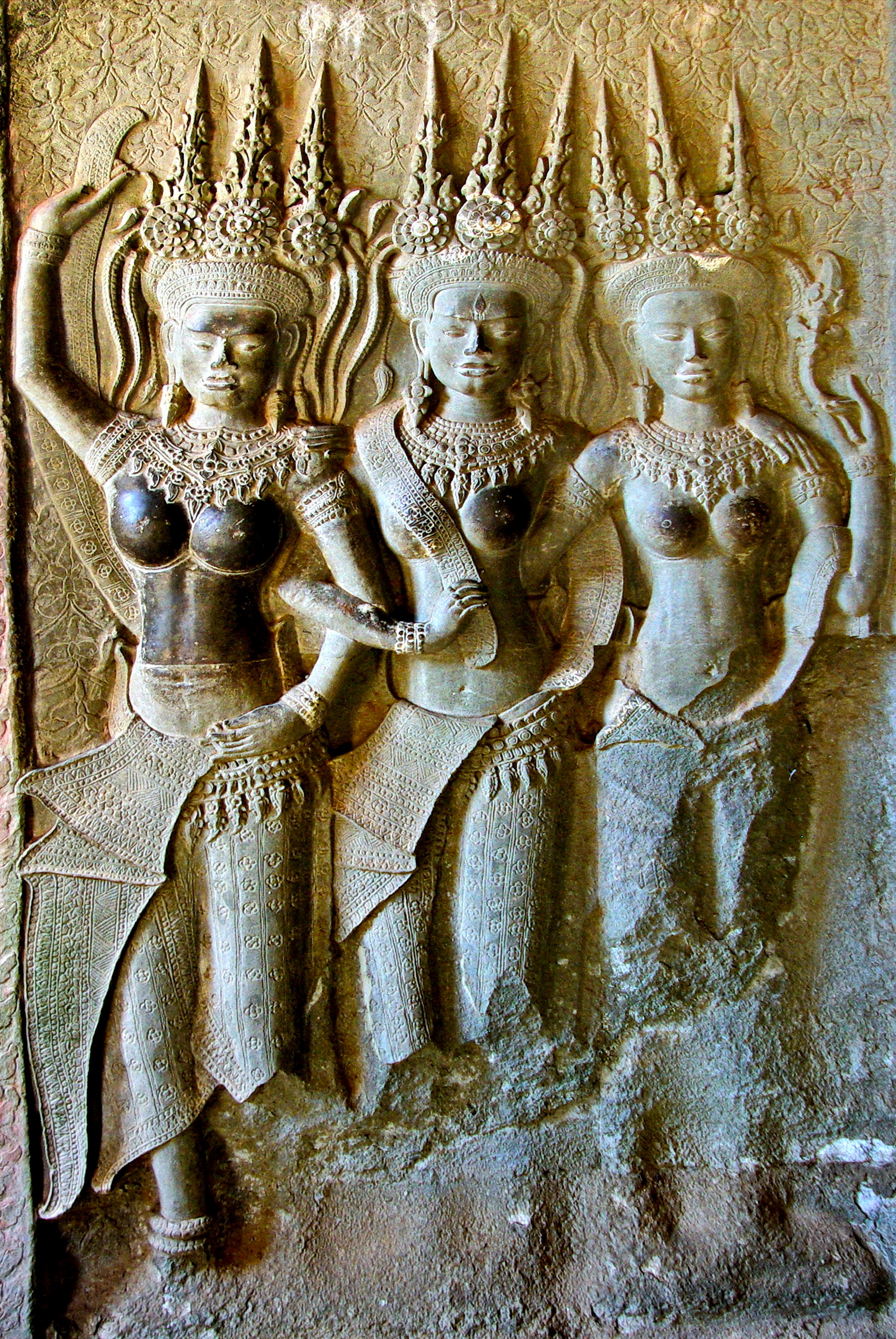
Khmer sbai: wrapping sbais attached to their sampots, 1100s AD Angkor Wat

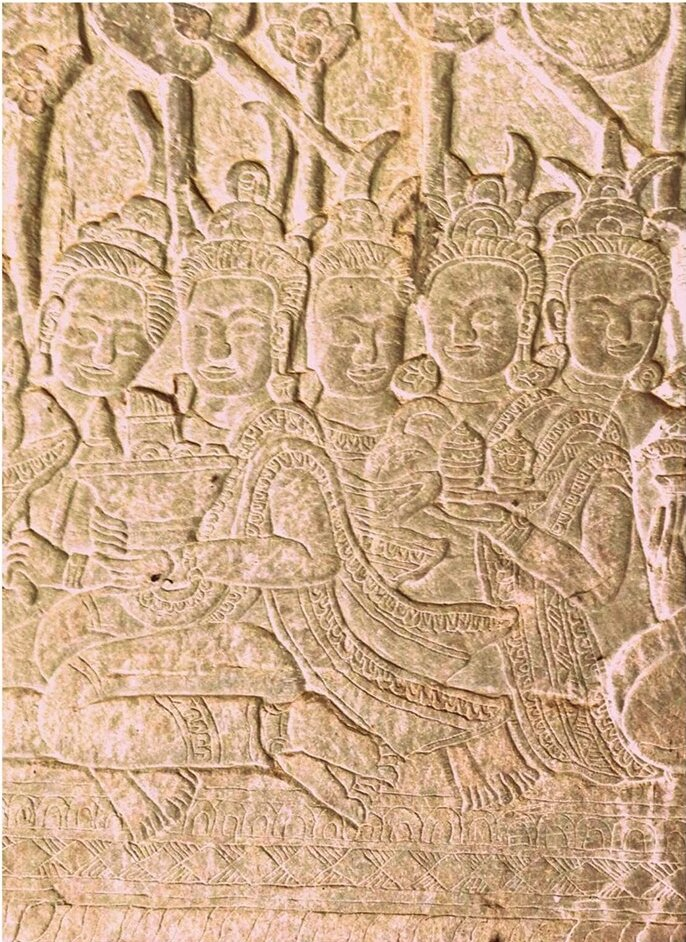
Khmer sbai: Buddhist women in long sbai, Angkor Wat, 1500s AD.

For men, especially Brahmin and Buddhist monk, the sbai called sbong sbai trai chivor, and is considered the robe of Hindu and Buddhist monks. For women, sbai can be freely used and in different ways such as to wrapping it around the body, covering the shoulder, and commonly covering the breast and stomach over the left shoulder. Prumsodun Ok on etymology:

...Monosyllable Khmer loan words become bi‑syllable in Thai with phka (flower) to phaka, spean (bridge) to sapan, and sbai to sabai. Ancient Khmers also referred to this garment in Sanskrit terms such as kapata and uttarasanga.

In a village called Sampan Leu in the Sa’ang District of Kandal province, sbai embroidery is a tradition passed down over generations for some 40 families, and the commune chief says the practice goes back to ancient times for some villages. Villagers from teenagers to 60 year olds participate in the process. The designs themselves are decided by customers and the "predefined patterns" are passed on to the embroiderers. Pieces are often rented by those visiting Angkor Wat, for festivals, and also weddings, and material is not limited to silk. The in-demand sbais are crafted with authentic, traditional Khmer patterns by the artisans with the goal of preserving Khmer culture.

In June of 2026, Cambodia’s Ministry of Culture and Fine Arts responded to comments by Thai officials perceived as claiming ownership of the sbai by saying the sbai in Cambodia dates back to the Funan era and is an important part of Khmer women’s attire “preserved and practiced by Khmer people across generations up to the present day.”

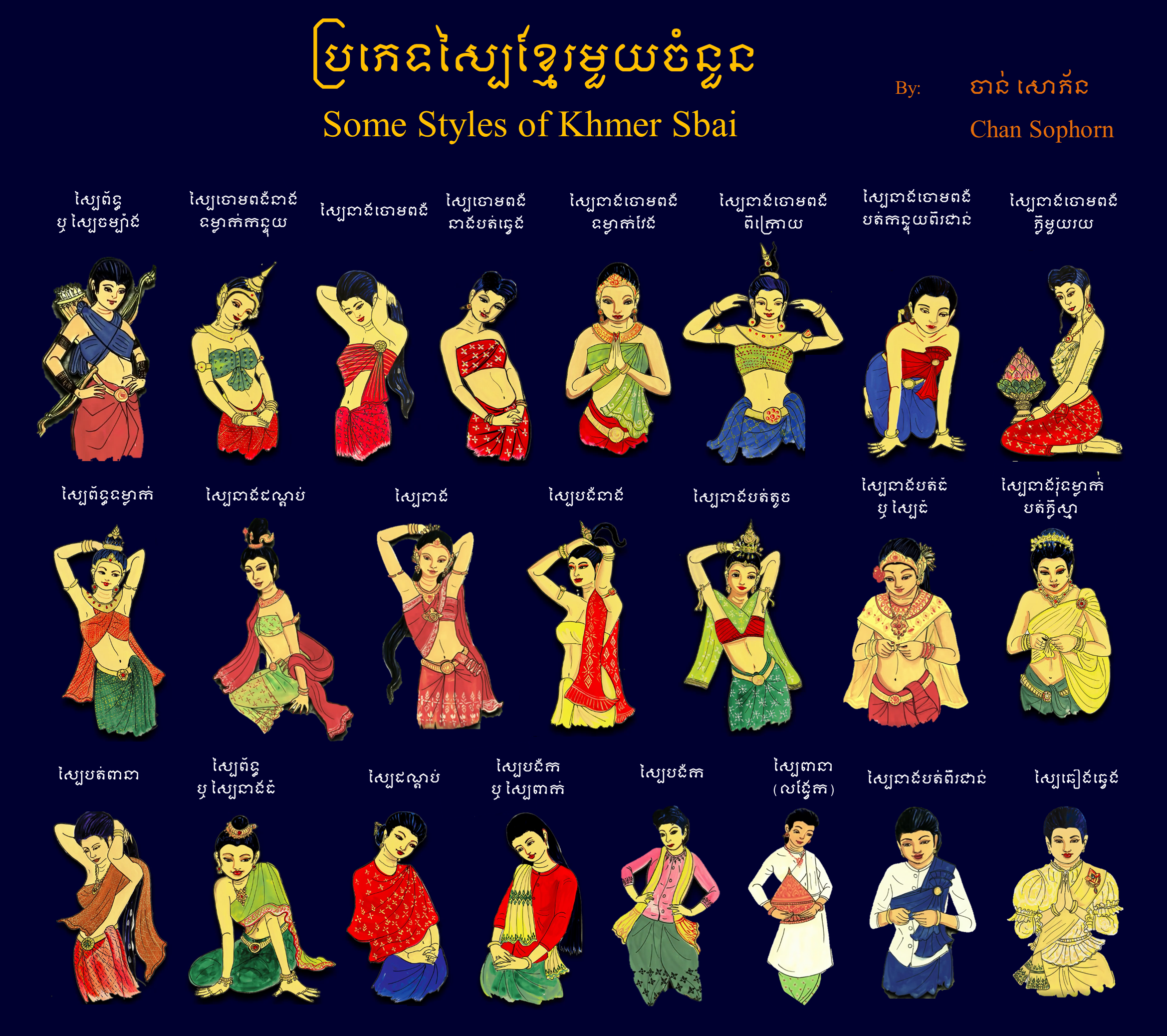
Chart illustrating traditional Khmer sbai draping styles

A 2026 classification by Cambodia's Ministry of Culture and Fine Arts divides traditional sbais into seven main styles:

- Sbai taong (ស្បៃតោង): Made with silk and copper/silver threads, usually at least 1.80 m (5.9 ft) in length and 0.35 to 0.40 m (14 to 16 in) in width. Traditionally linked to royalty and lead female or celestial characters in Khmer ballet, it’s draped diagonally over the left shoulder covering a one-shouldered bodice (av dai m'khang) and paired with a sampot samluy skirt instead of a sampot chong kben.
- Sbai phouy (ស្បៃភួយ): Thick, rectangular cloth with no curved tailoring, usualy 2.25 m (7.4 ft) long and 0.25 m (9.8 in) wide. Used for wedding ceremonies but never dance, it’s worn in two layers over a plain or pleated second sbai and paired with a sampot charabap. Brides wear a gold and red sbai phouy during the sampeah phtim ceremony, with the front end below the chest and throwing the other end over the left shoulder, down to the back of her knees.
- Sbai khviel (ស្បៃខ្វៀល, also called sbai viel): Constructed with an angled curve (khviel), sbai khviel measurres 1.60 to 2.50 m (5.2 to 8.2 ft) long by 0.60 m (24 in) wide. Traditionally, it’s worn by Khmer ballerinas and now also at weddings. It’s draped over her left shoulder, covering a one-shoulder bodice and exclusively worn with a sampot samluy.
- Sbai chhieng (ស្បៃឆៀង): LIke the sbai khviel, except shorter and narrower, sbai chhieng is 1.50 m (4.9 ft) long and 0.35 to 0.40 m (14 to 16 in) wide. Originally used only for Khmer ballet dramas, today it’s worn in bridal ensembles over a one-shoulder bodice and only paired with a sampot samluy.
- Sbai thom (ស្បៃធំ): A large, wide sbai covering both shoulders. Depending on its cut, it’s also known as sbai chrak ka (ស្បៃច្រកក, if made as a single piece with a neck opening pulled over her head) or sbai phluoh (ស្បៃភ្លោះ, or "twin sbai", when two pieces are sewn into a single garment).
- Sbai chib pli (ស្បៃជីបភ្លី): A light cloth with accordion pleats, historically worn regularly by commoners, officials' daughters, attendants, and musicians. Unlike the court-style sbai, it can be wrapped around or draped over the left shoulder covering various shirts, and paired with either a sampot samluy or a sampot chang kben.
- Sbai leat (ស្បៃលាត): A long, thin, and wide silk or cotton sbai without brocade or motifs. Historically worn by women regardless of class or age for daily tasks, visits to the pagoda or temple, and festivals, it’s paired with a samluy or chong kben.

=== Laos ===
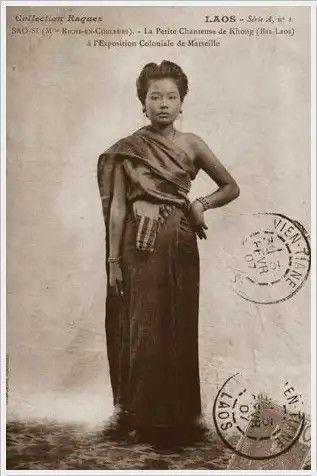
Sao Si (Ngao Si), Lao singer, in a phaa biang at the 1906 Colonial Exhibition in France.

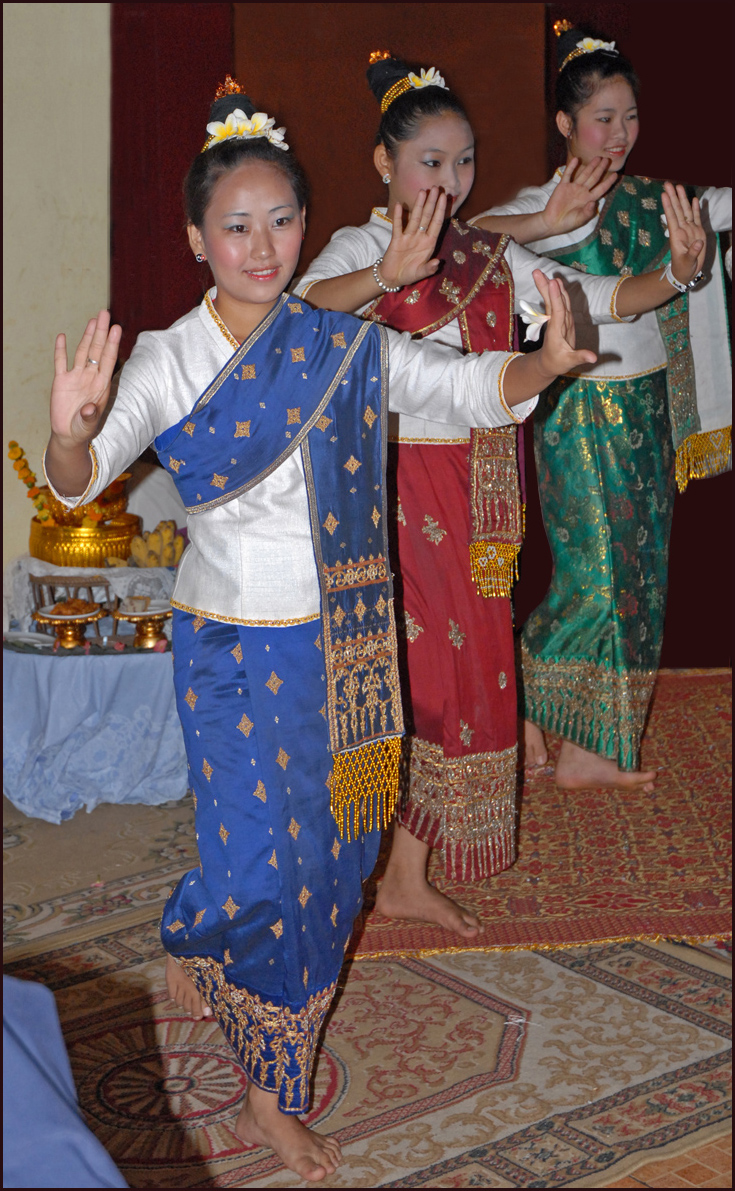
Lao traditional dancers in colorful sabai or phaa biang.

In Laos, this garment is known as phaa biang (Lao: ຜ້າບ່ຽງ) or sabai. It is common for Lao women to wear sabai/phaa biang as it is considered traditional clothing. A sabai can also be worn by men in weddings or when attending religious ceremonies. The type typically worn by Lao men often has checkered patterns. Sabai/phaa biang can also be a long piece of silk, about a foot wide, that is draped diagonally over the chest covering one shoulder with one end dropping behind the back. Important and sacred in Lao culture, phaa biang can be of various fabric and worn regardless of age. For occasions such as wedding ceremonies, visits to a pagoda, or New Year celebrations, the phaa biang is often draped over traditional outfits. Laywomen in Luang Prabang wear phaa biang to comply with Buddhist modesty rules. This secures the collar and keeps the upper body concealed. Women attending a Vat Manorom monk coronation laid their phaa biangs out on the hall floor to welcome the monks. The Lao sabai/phaa biang may bear a hybrid "dragon/serpent and ancient ship" image.

=== Malaysia ===
In Malaysia, sebai is a cloth wrapped around the neck to cover the shoulders with both ends hanging on the chest similar to a scarf hung over the shoulders. Sarong cloth in Malaysia may be made into a sebai, and it was Malay wedding tradition to gift a sarong to be fashioned into a sebai.

=== Mon people of Myanmar and Thailand ===
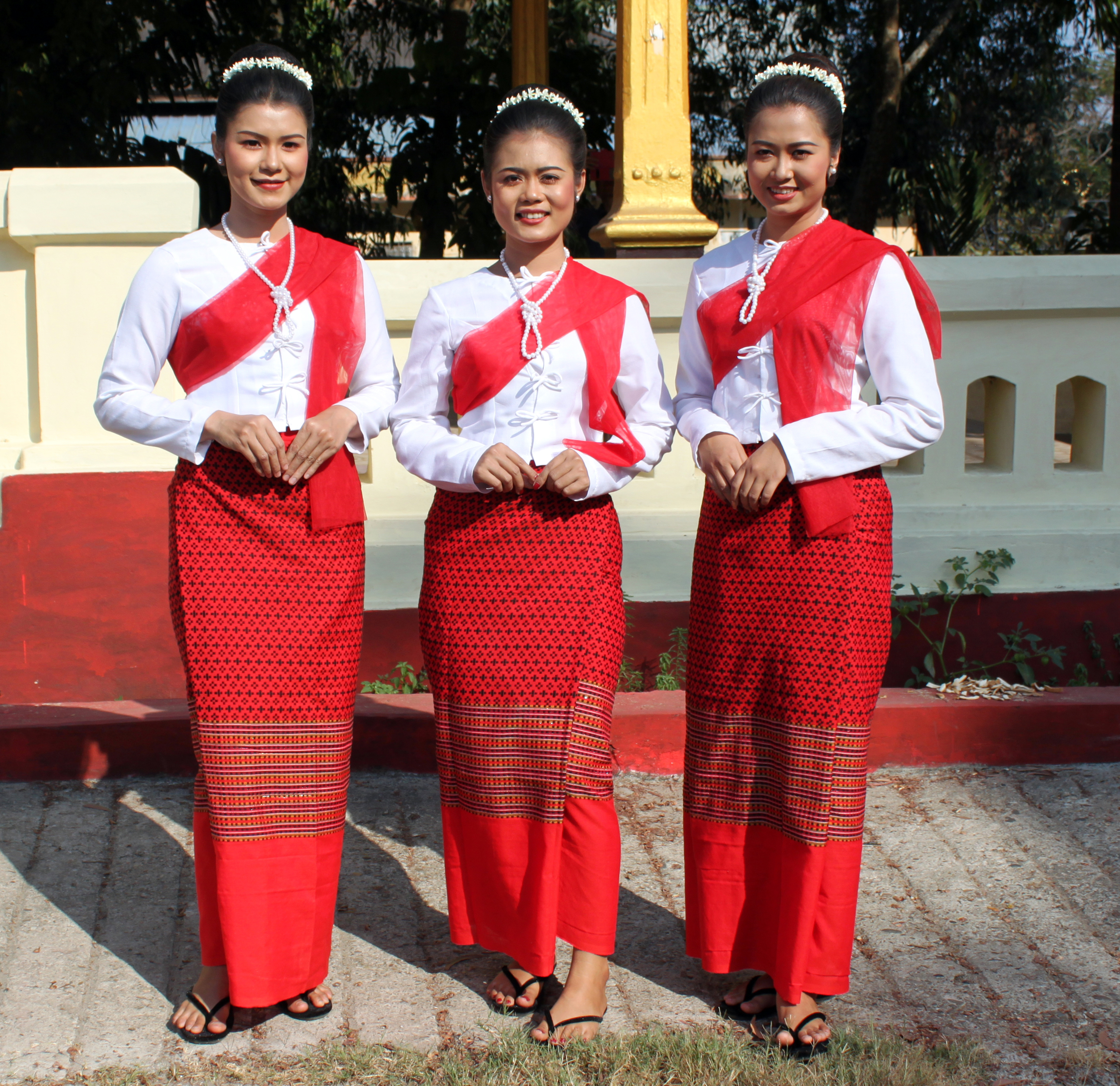
Mon women wearing traditional clothes in Mon State, Myanmar, including the yat toot, the Mon shawl-like breast cloth.

Dvaravati woman reproduced from Ku Bua figures, in a breast cloth resembling a yat toot.

Historically, the people of Dvaravati are identified by scholars as ethnically and culturally Mon, representing an early Indianized Mon polity. The Mon have a tradition of wearing the shawl-like breast cloth called yat toot in Mon language. Yat toots are often made of silk, worn diagonally across the chest and over one shoulder, with the garment's end flowing down behind the back. The garment may be embellished with motifs from the Mon heritage, such as the mythical hongsa, a Mon water bird often represented as a duck or swan, and accented with Mon floral symbols. In 2024, University of the Philippines Open University (UPOU) Professor Emeritus Dr. Grace Javier Alfonso travelled to the Mon community of Bang Tanai in Thailand to help reinvigorate the Mon yat toot tradition through packaging that showcases Mon craftsmanship. Artifacts found in ethnic Mon Dvaravati sites depict group of ladies wearing what is similar to yat toot.

=== Thailand ===
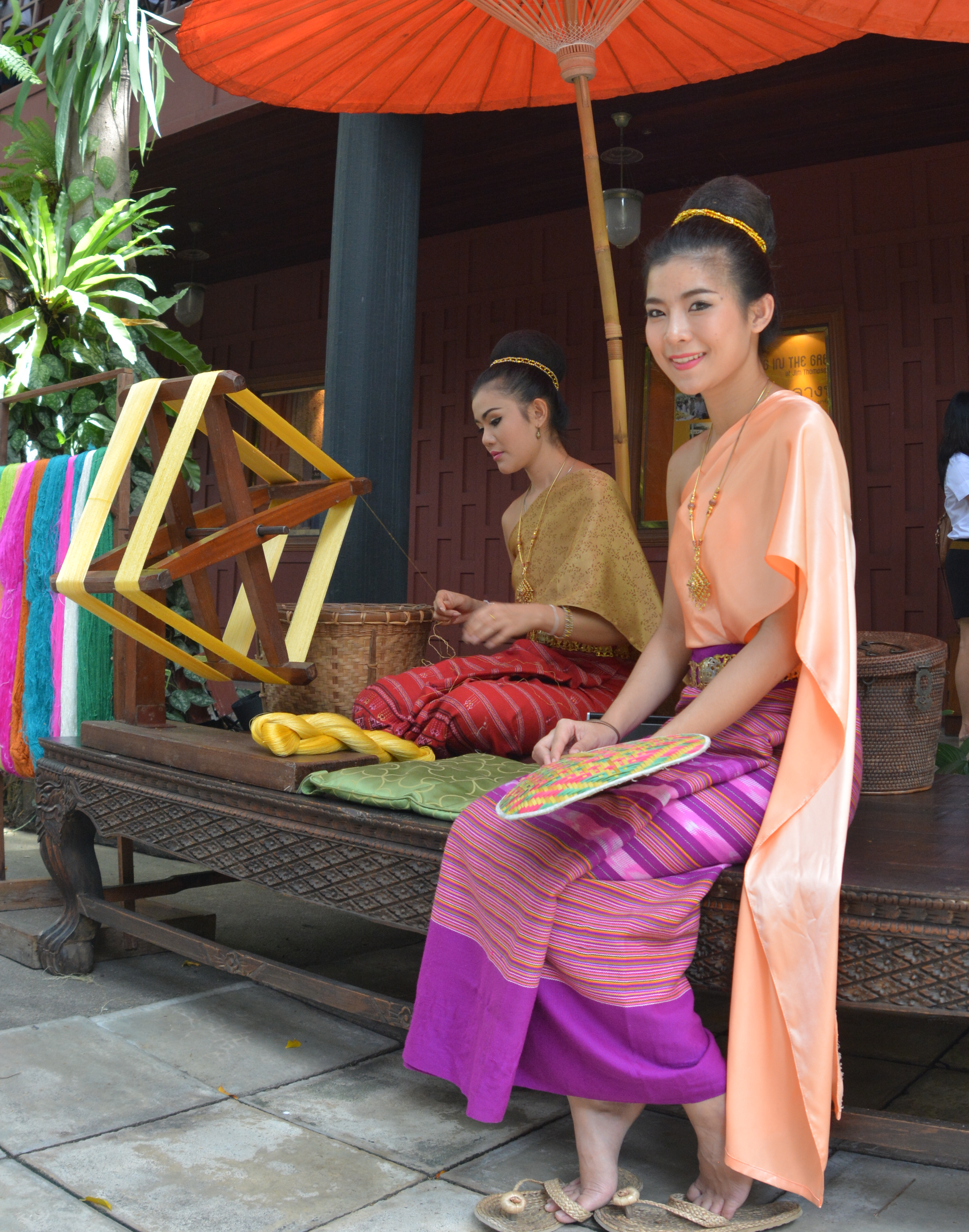
Thai women in sabai at Jim Thompson House

Sabai (Thai: สไบ, RTGS: sabai, pronounced [sābāj]) or pha biang (Thai: ผ้าเบี่ยง pronounced [pʰâː.bìaŋ]) is shawl-like garment, or breast cloth. Sabais can be used by women or men. The sabai is also known as a long piece of silk, about a foot wide, draped diagonally around the chest by covering one shoulder which its end drops behind the back. Sabais could be worn around the naked chest or on top of another cloth. The practice of wearing Sabai along with Victorian cloth was a common practice during the reign of King Chulalongkorn and lasted until the reign of King Vajiravudh when Westernized clothing became more fashionable.

== Gallery ==
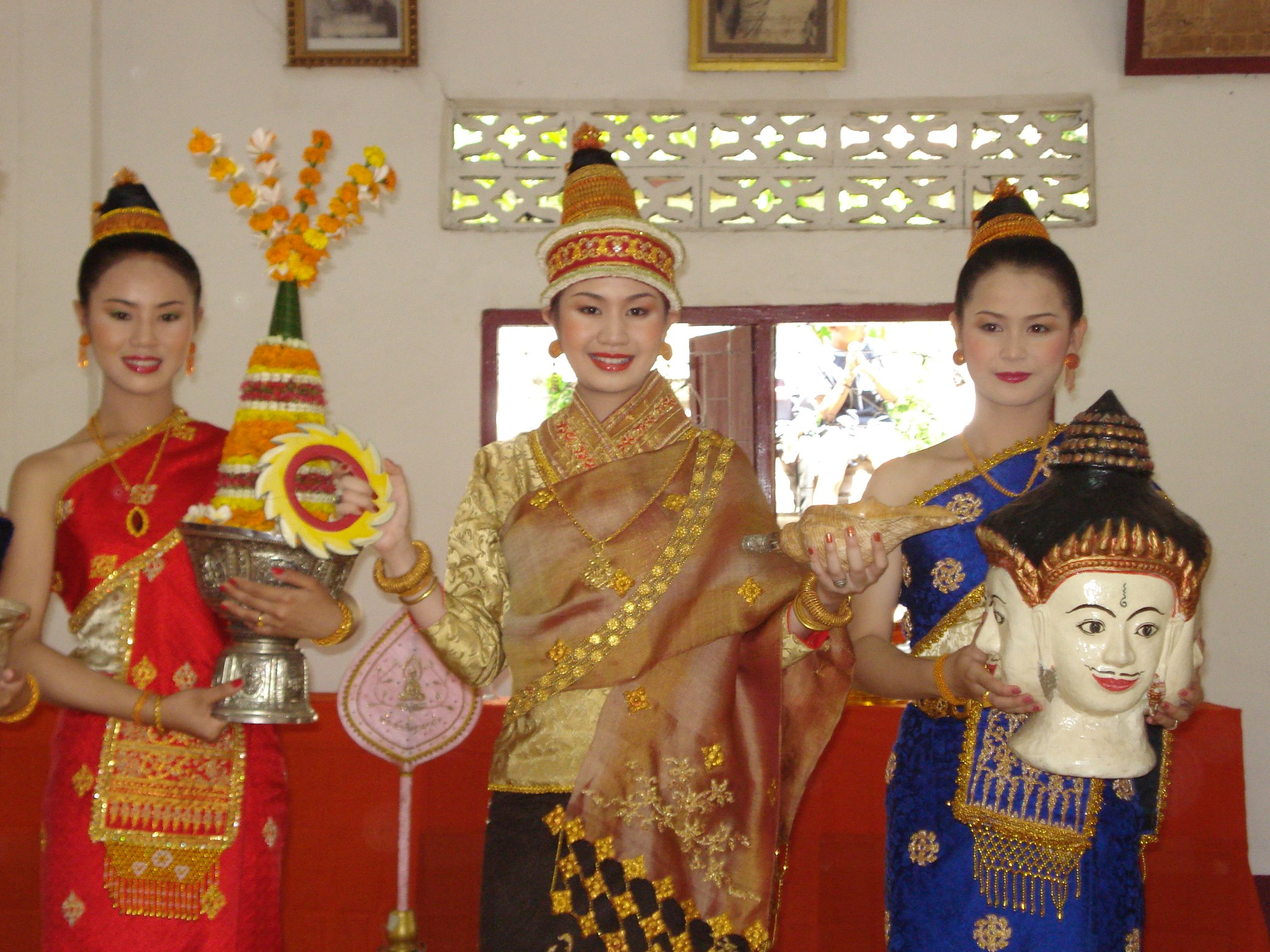
Lao sabai/phaa biang. Xout Lao (ຊຸດລາວ) is a Lao/Laotian national costume.

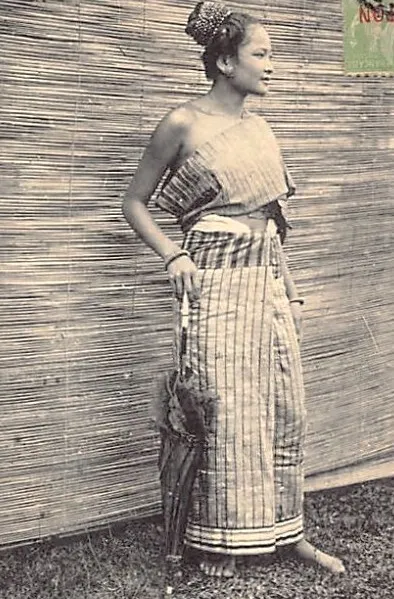
Lao woman of culture wearing Lao sabai/phaa biang in Luang Prabang, 1906.

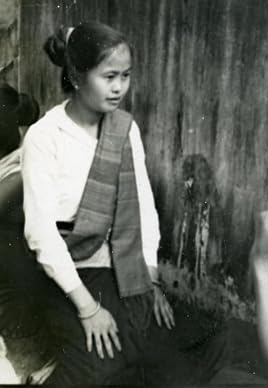
Lao woman of Vientiane in narrow phaa biang (or sbai), 1930.

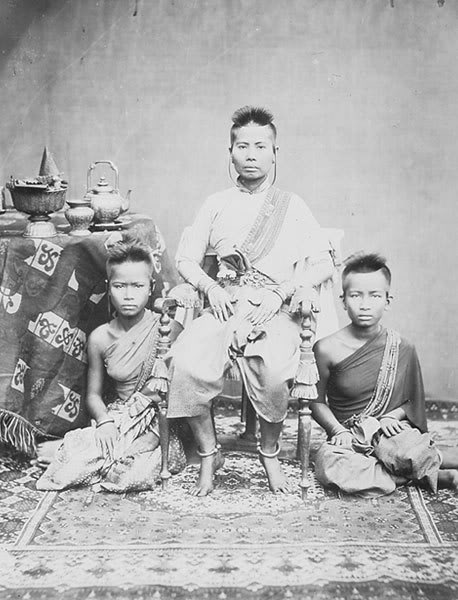
Khmer (Cambodian) Queen Ang Mey and her daughters wearing sbai in the 1800s

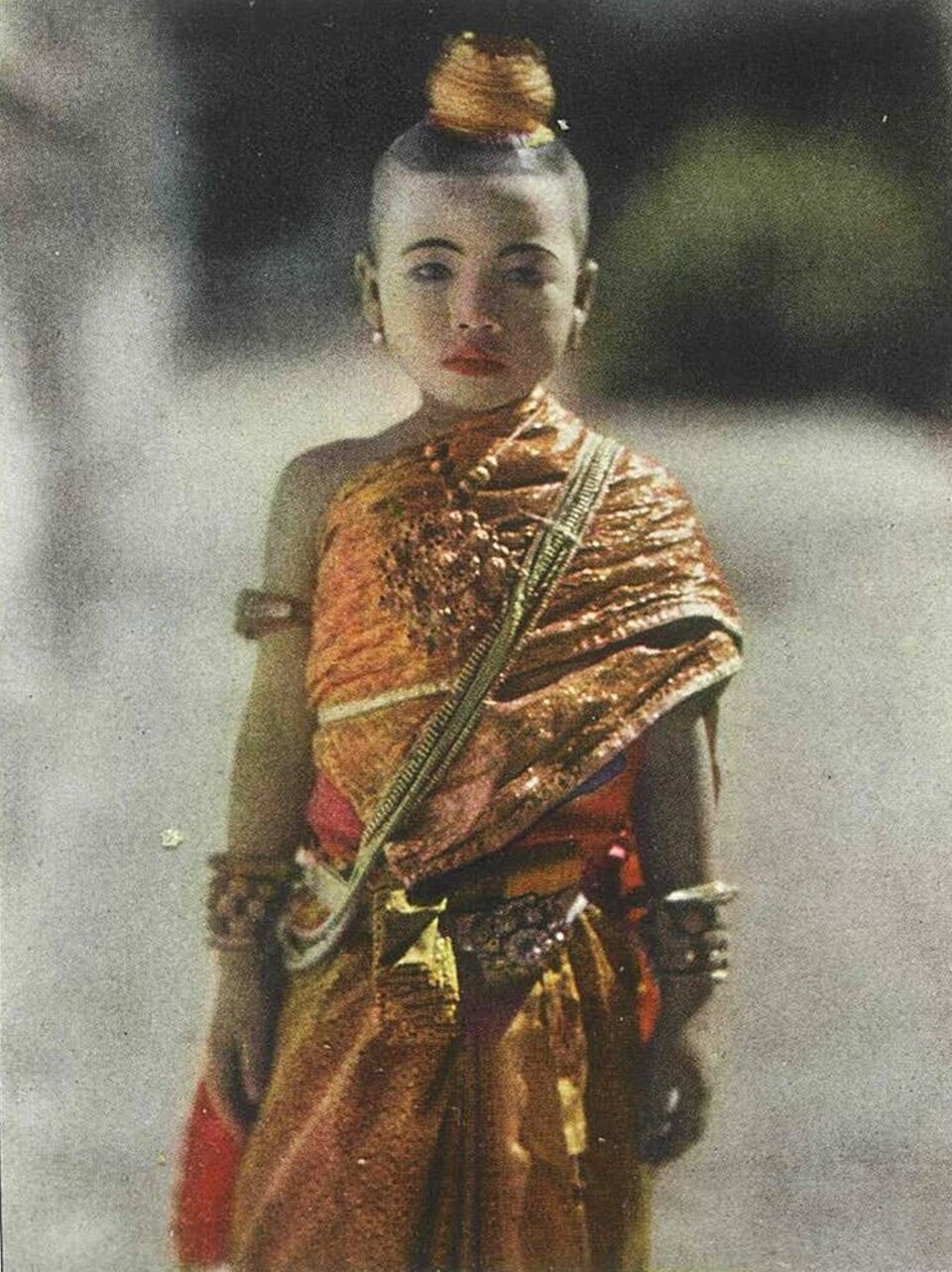
Khmer (Cambodian) princess wearing a sbai for hair-cutting ceremony, circa 1928.

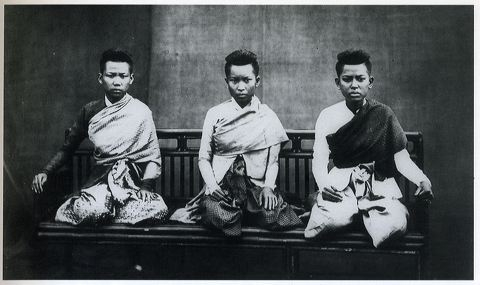
Upper-class Khmer (Cambodian) women in sbais, 1800s.

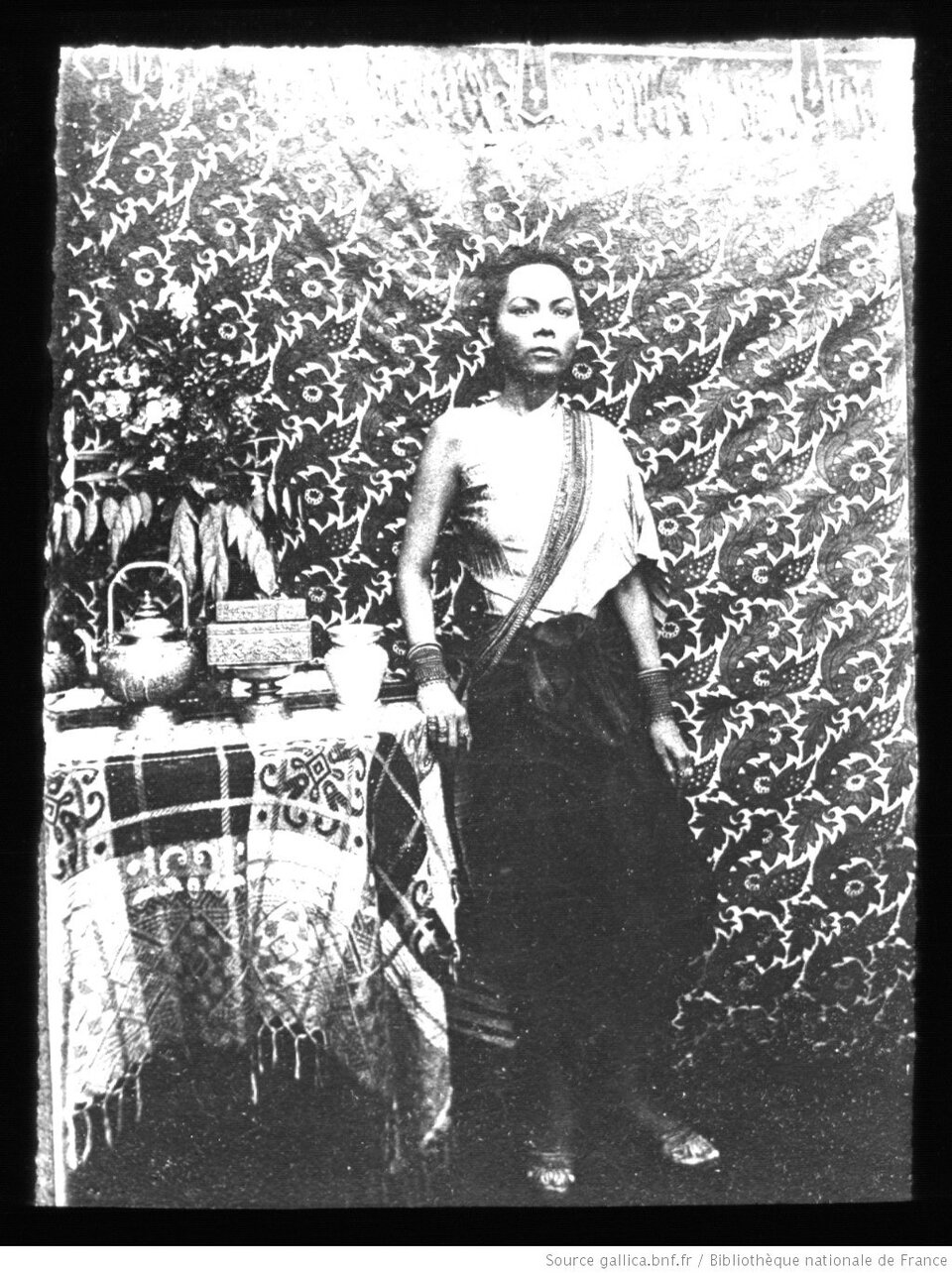
Khmer (Cambodian) Palace woman wearing sbai, 1874-1888.

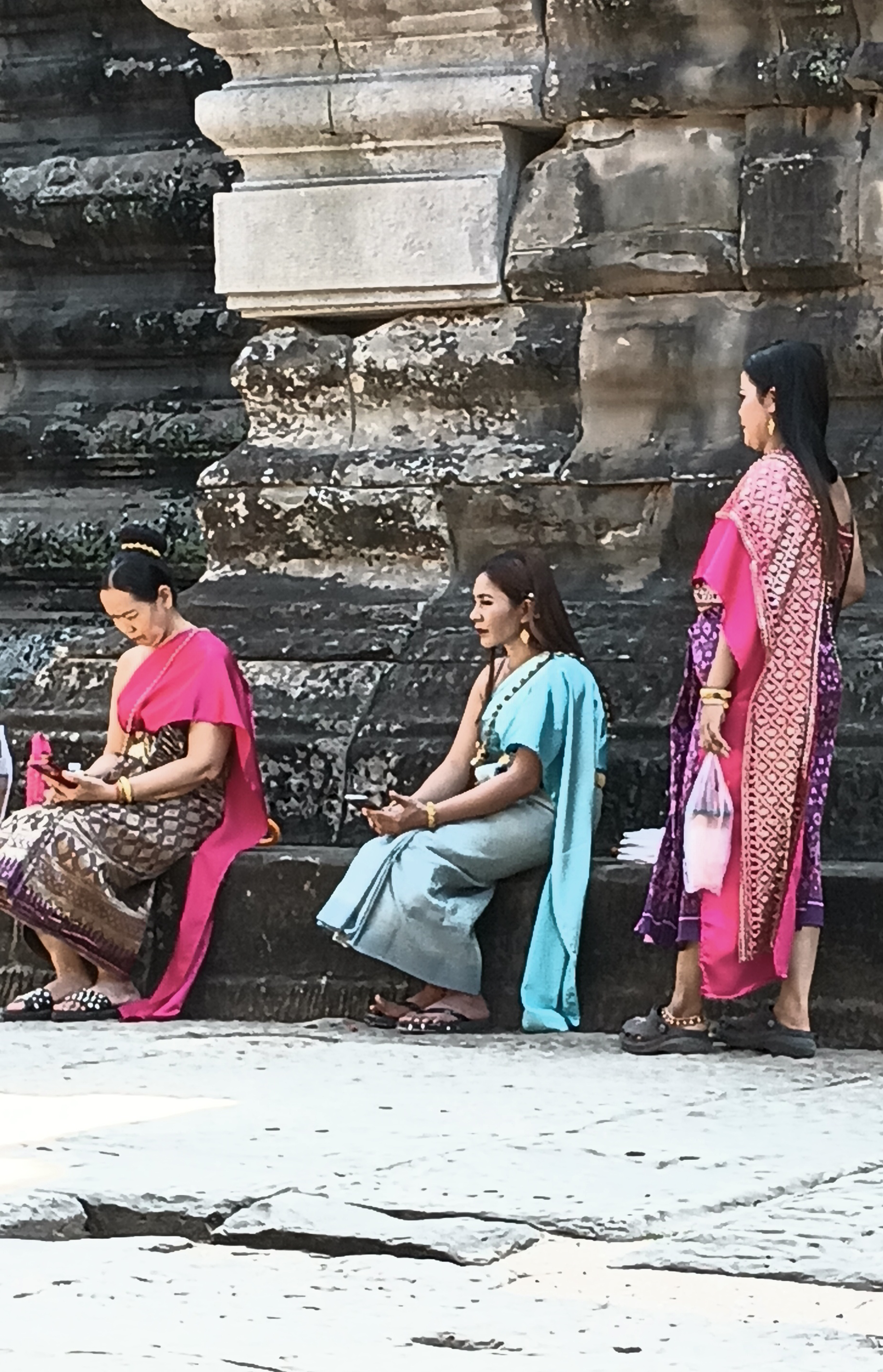
Khmer (Cambodian) women wearing sbais for ceremony at Angkor Wat, 2022.

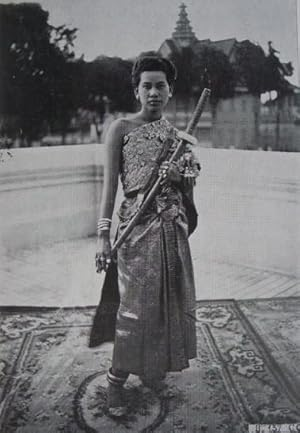
Khmer (Cambodian) guard for King Sisowath (1904-1928) wearing a sbai

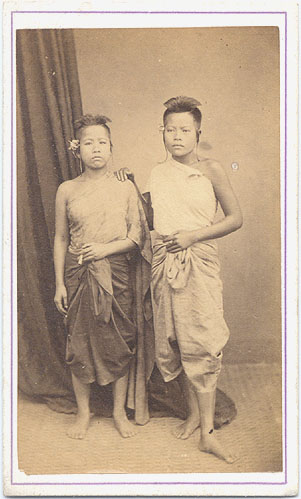
Young Khmer (Cambodian) girls wearing sbai, 1870-1900.

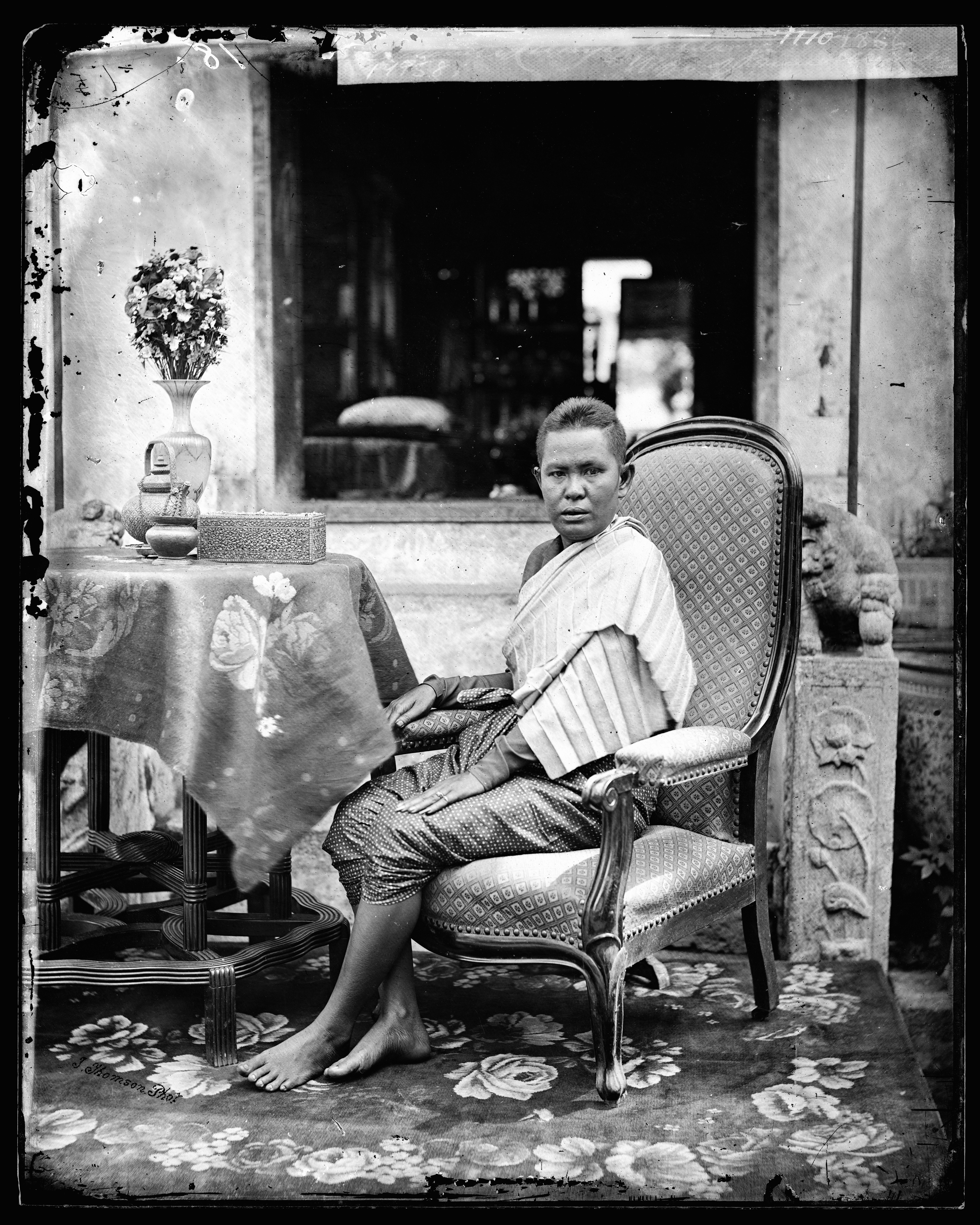
Lady Pun Bunnag, Somdet Chaophraya Borom Maha Sri Suriwongse's wife wearing pha biang, 1866

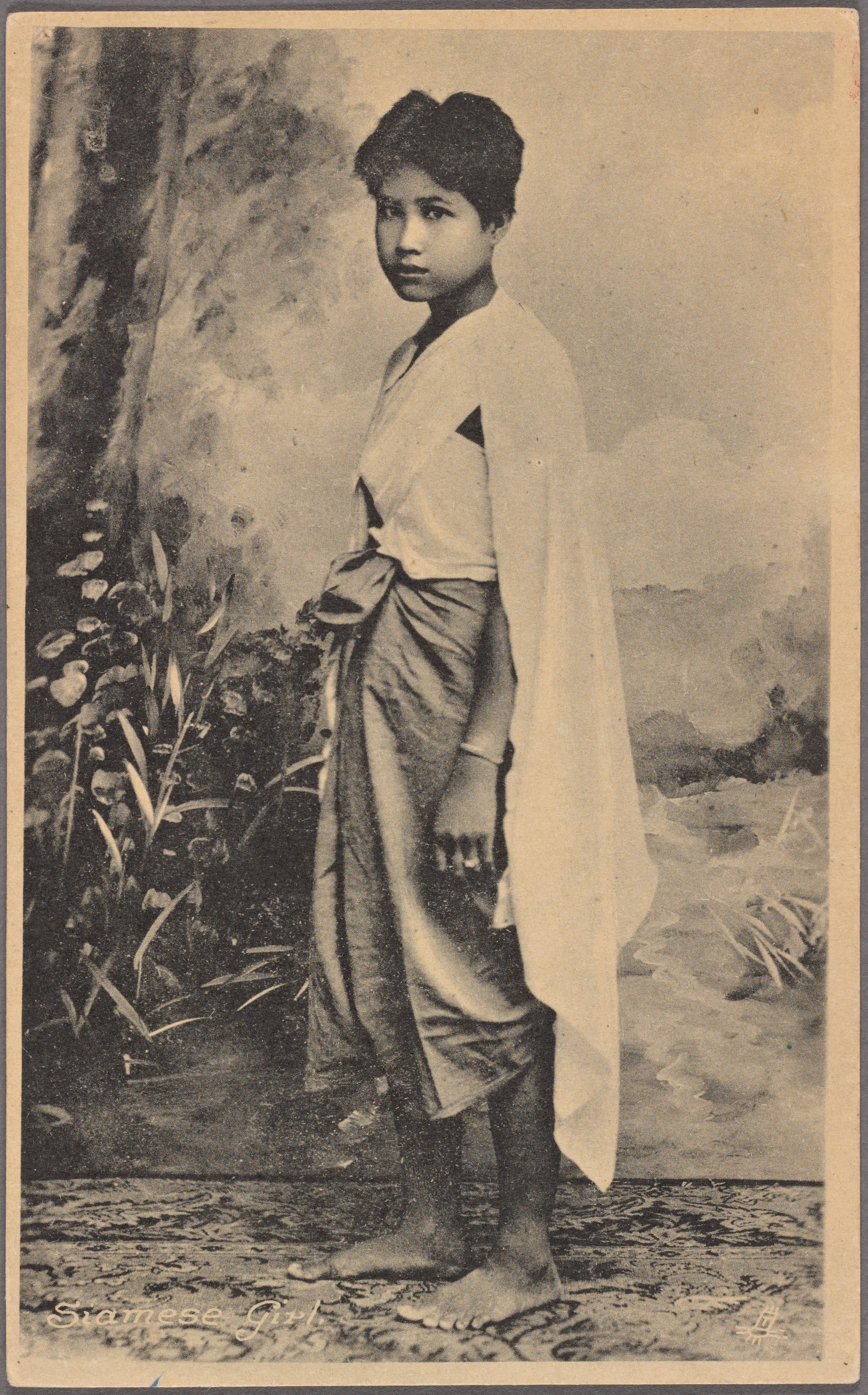
Siamese girl wearing pha biang, 1921

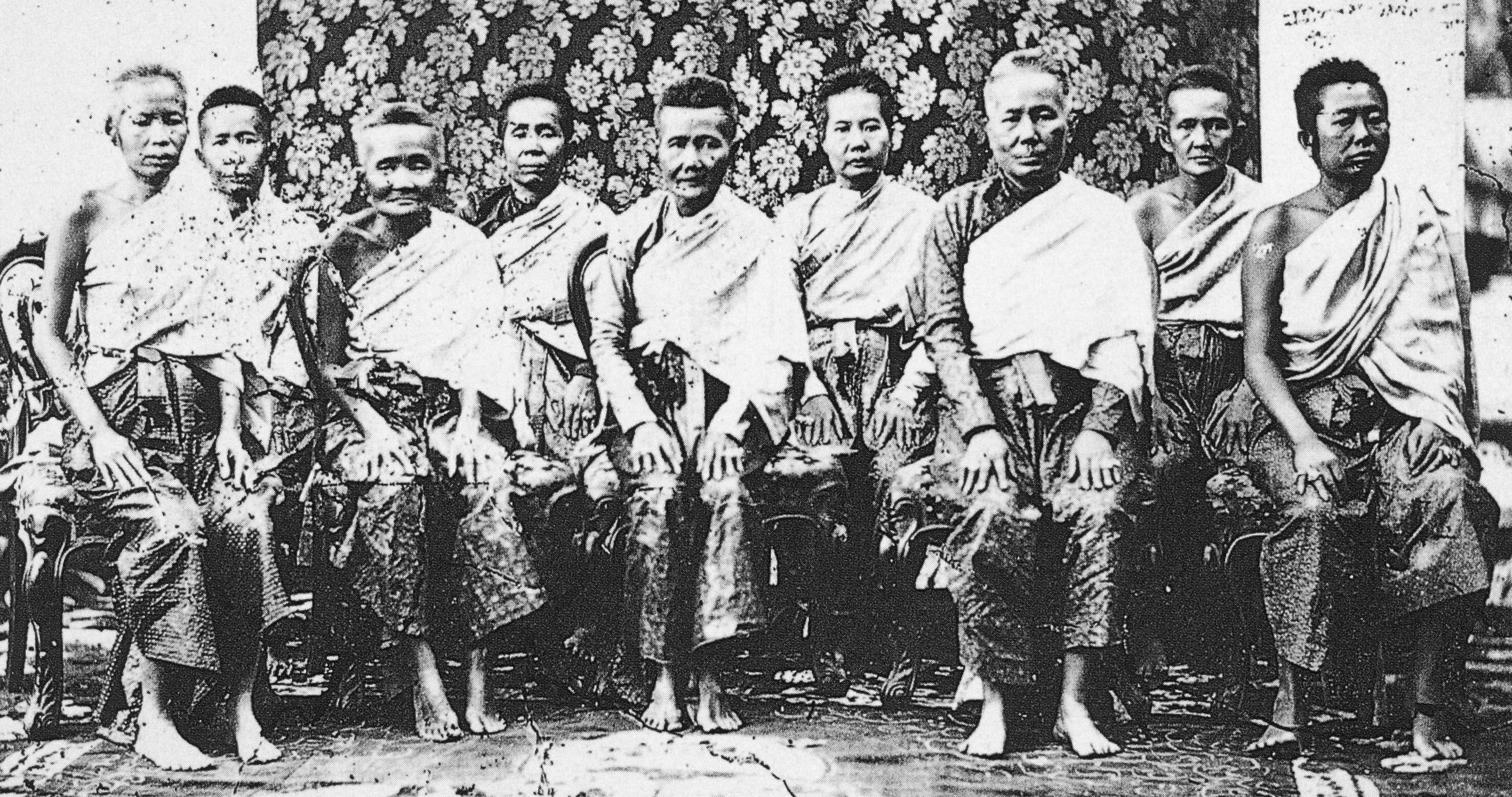
Daughters of King Rama II and King Rama III wearing pha biang in the 1800s

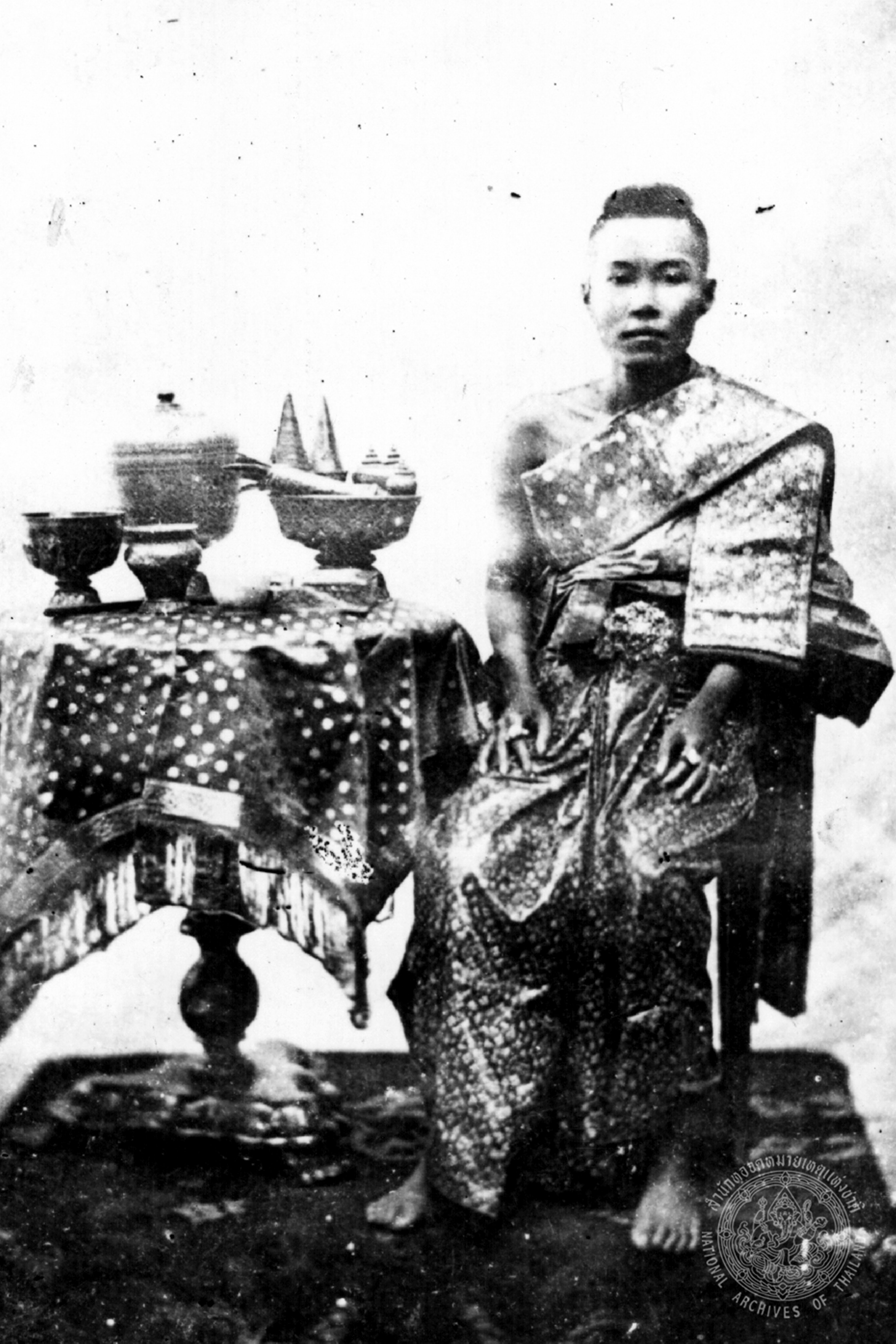
Queen Debsirindra wearing pha biang, 1855

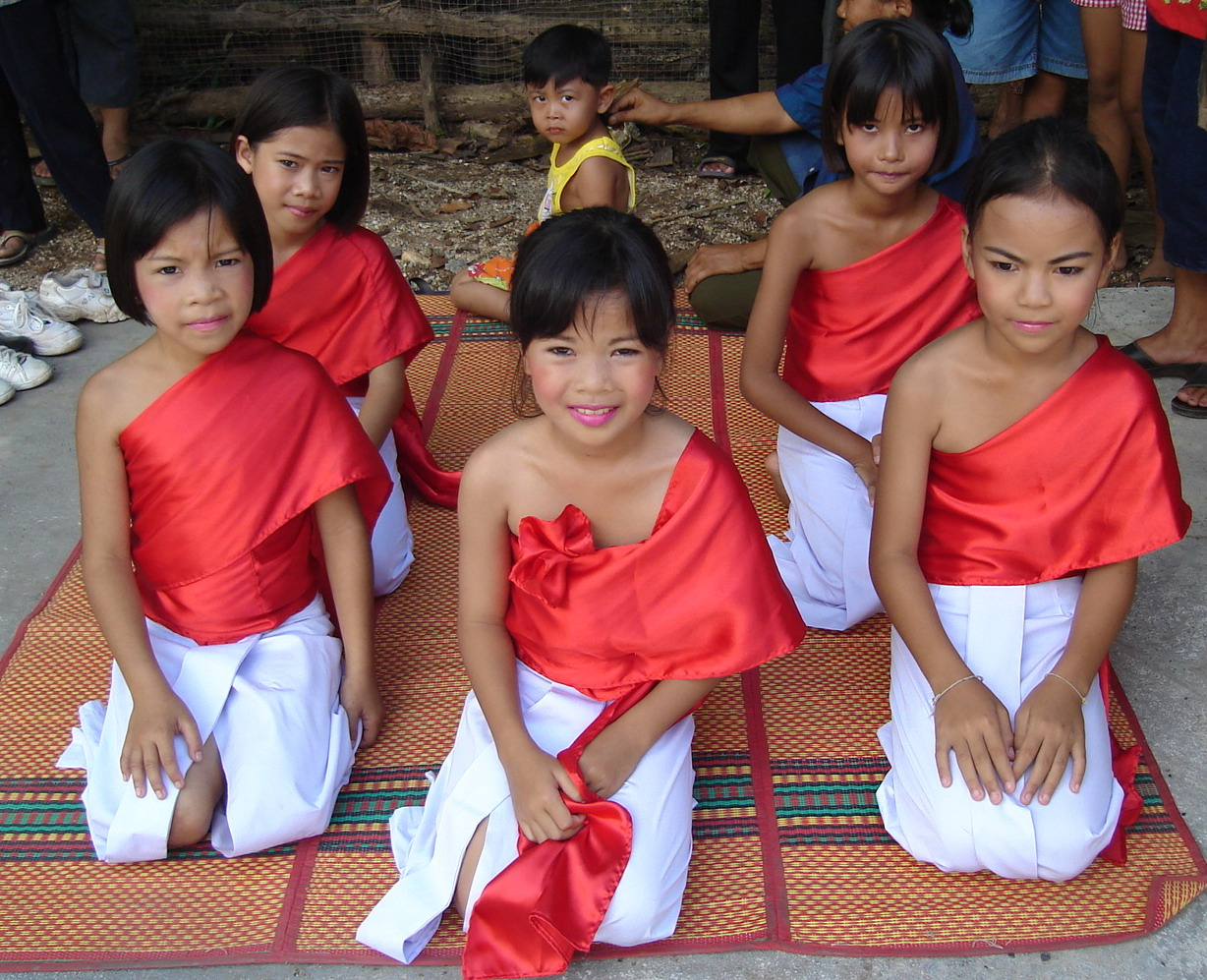
Thai children wearing pha nung and pha biang

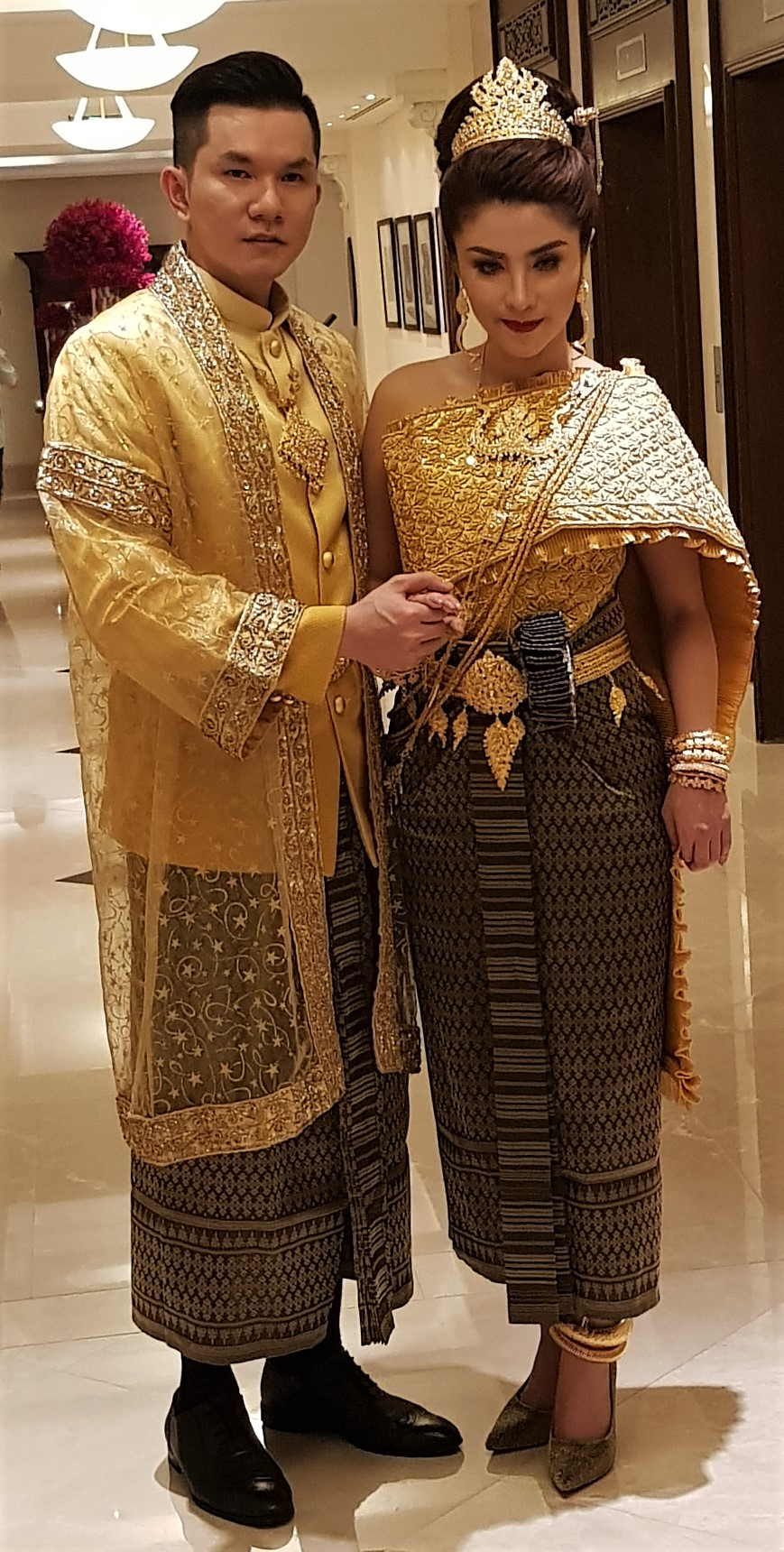
Cambodian bride wearing a sbai in a wedding ceremony

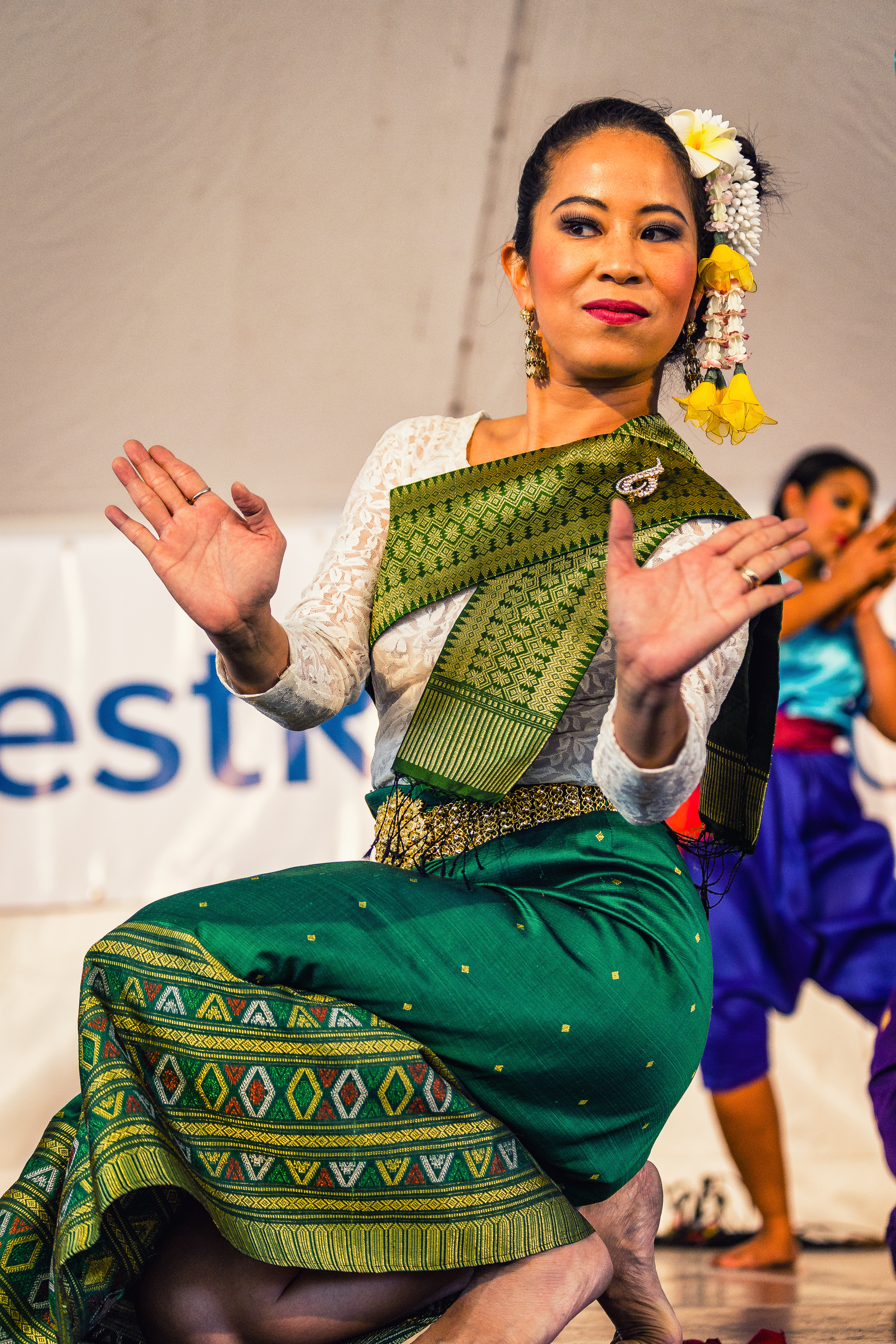
Cambodian American dancer wearing sbai

== See also ==
- Sompot chong kben
- Khmer traditional clothing
- Culture of Cambodia
- Traditional Thai clothing
- Sampot
- Sampot chang samluy
- Kemben
- Malaysian cultural outfits
- Sari
