= Santo Domingo (disambiguation) =

Santo Domingo is the capital and largest city of the Dominican Republic.

Santo Domingo may also refer to:

== Places ==
- Santo Domingo, a historic name for the island of Hispaniola
  - Captaincy General of Santo Domingo, the former Spanish colony on the island
- Santo Domingo, the common English name for the Dominican Republic until the 20th century

=== Areas of the Dominican Republic ===
- Santo Domingo Province, a province, split in 2001 from the National District, that includes the hinterland of the capital city of the same name
- Greater Santo Domingo, the metropolitan area of Santo Domingo and its surroundings
- Roman Catholic Archdiocese of Santo Domingo, Latin Metropolitan Archdiocese in the Dominican Republic

=== Municipalities ===
==== Argentina ====
- Santo Domingo, La Rioja
- Santo Domingo, Santa Fe

==== Chile ====
- Santo Domingo, Chile, a city and commune

==== Colombia ====
- Santo Domingo, Antioquia
- Silos, Norte de Santander, a municipality of Norte de Santander Department, also known as Santo Domingo de Silos

==== Costa Rica ====
- Santo Domingo, Costa Rica

==== Cuba ====
- Santo Domingo, Cuba, a municipality in Villas Clara, Cuba

==== Ecuador ====
- Santo Domingo de Los Tsáchilas Province, a province in Ecuador, incorporating:
  - Santo Domingo Canton (Ecuador), the only canton in that province
  - Santo Domingo, Ecuador, the Capital of the province
  - Roman Catholic Diocese of Santo Domingo in Ecuador, the diocese with its seat in that city

==== El Salvador ====
- Santo Domingo, El Salvador, San Vicente
- Santo Domingo de Guzmán, El Salvador, Sonsonate

==== Guatemala ====
- Santo Domingo de Cobán, another name for Cobán
- Santo Domingo Xenacoj, a municipality

==== Mexico ====
- Santo Domingo (Mexico City), a church and plaza
- Santo Domingo, Oaxaca (disambiguation), several places
- Santo Domingo, San Luis Potosí, a municipality
- Misión Santo Domingo de la Frontera

==== Nicaragua ====
- Santo Domingo, Nicaragua, Chontales

==== Panama ====
- Santo Domingo, Chiriquí
- Santo Domingo, Los Santos

==== Paraguay ====
- Santo Domingo (Asunción)

==== Peru ====
- Santo Domingo District, district in Morropon Province, Piura region
- Santo Domingo de los Olleros District, district in Huarochiri Province, Lima region
- Santo Domingo de la Capilla District, district in Cutervo Province, Cajamarca region
- Santo Domingo de Acobamba District, district in Huancayo Province, Junin region
- Santo Domingo de Capillas District, district in Huaytara Province, Huancavelica region

==== Philippines ====
- Santo Domingo, Albay, a 4th class municipality
- Santo Domingo, Cainta
- Santo Domingo, Ilocos Sur, a 3rd class municipality
- Santo Domingo, Nueva Ecija, a 3rd class municipality

==== Puerto Rico ====
- Santo Domingo, Peñuelas, Puerto Rico
  - Santo Domingo, Puerto Rico, a commune of Peñuelas
- Santo Domingo (Peñuelas)

==== Spain ====
- Santo Domingo de la Calzada, after Domingo de la Calzada
- Santo Domingo de Silos, after Dominic of Silos
- Santo Domingo (Madrid Metro), a station on Line 2

==== United States ====
- Santo Domingo Pueblo, New Mexico, a Native American pueblo in New Mexico

==== Venezuela ====
- Santo Domingo, Mérida
- Santo Domingo, Táchira

=== Rivers ===
- Santo Domingo River, Venezuela
- Santo Domingo River (Papaloapan), Mexico
- Santo Domingo River (Chiapas), Mexico
- Santo Domingo River (Oaxaca), Mexico
- São Domingos Grande River, Brazil

=== Buildings ===
==== Churches and other religious buildings ====
- Santo Domingo convent, in Buenos Aires, Argentina
- Church of Santo Domingo de Guzmán, a church and former monastery in Oaxaca, Mexico
- Santo Domingo (Mexico City), a church and plaza in the historic center of Mexico City
- Santo Domingo Church (Quezon City), a Roman Catholic national shrine and parish church in Quezon City, Philippines
- Basilica and Convent of Santo Domingo, a Rococo-Mudéjar Colonial basilica in Lima, Peru
- Monastery of Santo Domingo de Silos, in Spain
- Church of Santo Domingo, Soria, a church in Spain
- Santo Domingo, Oviedo, a church in Spain
- Santo Domingo de Guzman, Terrinches, a 15th-century church in Spain

==== Other buildings ====
- Fort Santo Domingo, a former Spanish fort on Taiwan in present-day Tamsui
- Estadio Santo Domingo (disambiguation)

=== Geology ===
- Santo Domingo Formation, Miocene sedimentary formation in Southern Chile
- Laguna Brava Formation, formerly known as Santo Domingo Formation, Eocene sedimentary formation in the Argentine Northwest

== People ==
- Santo Domingo (1170–1221), a Spanish priest usually known in English as Saint Dominic

=== Santo Domingo family ===
Members of the Santo Domingo family, a prominent Colombian-American family:

- Julio Mario Santo Domingo (1923–2011), billionaire and former director of the Santo Domingo Group
- Julio Mario Santo Domingo Jr., Colombian-American businessman
- Tatiana Santo Domingo, member of the royal family of Monaco
- Bettina Santo Domingo, American filmmaker
- Carolina Santo Domingo, American fashion designer
- Lauren Santo Domingo, American fashion businesswoman
- Alejandro Santo Domingo, Colombian-American businessman
- Nieves Santo Domingo, Argentine journalist
- Lady Charlotte Santo Domingo, British socialite

== Other ==
- "Santo Domingo" (song), a 1965 pop song by Wanda Jackson

== See also ==
- St Dominic (disambiguation)
- San Domenico (disambiguation)
- Saint-Domingue, historical French colony on Hispaniola
- Domingo (disambiguation)
- San Domingo (disambiguation)
