= Bettina Santo Domingo =

American filmmaker

Bettina Santo Domingo is an American filmmaker, businesswoman, and former media manager of Moda Operandi, a fashion discovery platform.

== Career ==
Santo Domingo worked as the media manager of Moda Operandi, a fashion discovery platform founded by Lauren Santo Domingo in 2011. In 2012 she filmed the company's Swim Week trunshows. In 2015 Santo Domingo filmed Moda Operandi's Fashion Firsts series featuring Diane von Furstenberg, Naomi Campbell, Andre Leon Talley, Zac Posen, and Carlyne Cerf de Dudzeele.

Santo Domingo also works as an independent documentary filmmaker. While working for Moda Operandi she directed a short film titled MOVE, featuring Isabella Boylston and Leiomy Maldonado. She has also worked on the documentaries Child of Cambodia, documenting Sophia Lim in Battambang as she worked to create mobile library programs for children in remote Cambodian villages, and directed the documentary In this climate, which covered women at Standing Rock Indian Reservation. Santo Domingo produced the first season of the podcast Sex Ed.

== Personal life ==
Santo Domingo was raised in Los Angeles, California. A member of the Santo Domingo family, a prominent Colombian family, she is the daughter of Luis Felipe Santo Domingo and Karen Hinds. Her father, who died in 1997, was a nephew of Julio Mario Santo Domingo. Santo Domingo is the sister of handbag designer Carolina Santo Domingo. She attended Northeastern University in Boston, where she studied sociology.

In 2013 she attended the wedding of her cousin, Tatiana Santo Domingo, and Andrea Casiraghi, a son of Caroline, Princess of Hanover, at the Prince's Palace of Monaco.
