= Carolina Santo Domingo =

American fashion designer

Carolina Santo Domingo is an American handbag designer.

== Biography ==
Santo Domingo is a member of the Santo Domingo family, a prominent family of Colombian origin. She is the daughter of Luis Felipe Santo Domingo, a nephew of Julio Mario Santo Domingo, and Karen Hinds. She is a sister of filmmaker Bettina Santo Domingo. Santo Domingo is a niece of Lauren Santo Domingo and a cousin of Tatiana Santo Domingo.

She worked as a designer for Staud, creating the “Bissett” bag for the Los Angeles-based brand in November 2015. In 2016 she launched her own line of handbags. Her line, based in Los Angeles, is produced in Italy. The handbag line is sold at Bergdorf Goodman and at Moda Operandi. Prior to designing, she worked as a design assistant for accessories at Belstaff.
