= São Domingos =

São Domingos (Portuguese for Saint Dominic) may refer to:

== Places ==
=== Brazil ===
- São Domingos, Bahia
- São Domingos, Goiás
- São Domingos, Santa Catarina
- São Domingos, Sergipe
- São Domingos do Araguaia, Pará
- São Domingos do Azeitão, Maranhão
- São Domingos do Capim, Pará
- São Domingos do Cariri, Paraíba
- São Domingos das Dores, Minas Gerais
- São Domingos do Maranhão, Maranhãop
- São Domingos do Norte, Espírito Santo
- São Domingos de Pombal, Paraíba
- São Domingos do Prata, Minas Gerais
- São Domingos do Sul, Rio Grande do Sul
- São Domingos (district of São Paulo)
- A neighbourhood of Niterói

=== Cape Verde ===
- São Domingos, Cape Verde, a town in the island of Santiago
- São Domingos, Cape Verde (municipality), a municipality in the island of Santiago

=== Portugal ===
- São Domingos (Santiago do Cacém), a parish in the municipality of Santiago do Cacém
- São Domingos de Ana Loura, a parish in the municipality of Estremoz
- São Domingos de Benfica, a parish in the municipality of Lisbon
- São Domingos de Rana, a parish in the municipality of Cascais

=== Guinea-Bissau ===
- São Domingos (Guinea-Bissau), a municipality in north-western Guinea-Bissau

== Other ==
- São Domingos Futebol Clube, a Brazilian football (soccer) club
- Associação Sportiva São Domingos, a Brazilian football (soccer) club

== See also ==
- Domingos (name)
- São Domingos River (disambiguation)
- San Domingo (disambiguation)
- Santo Domingo (disambiguation)
