= International School of Paris =

Location
- Paris; France; 48.85865°N 2.28714°E

Information
- Type: Day School
- Established: 1964
- Head of school: Mr. David Henry
- Grades: Nursery - 12
- Enrollment: around 700
- Mascot: Panther
- Website: http://www.isparis.edu

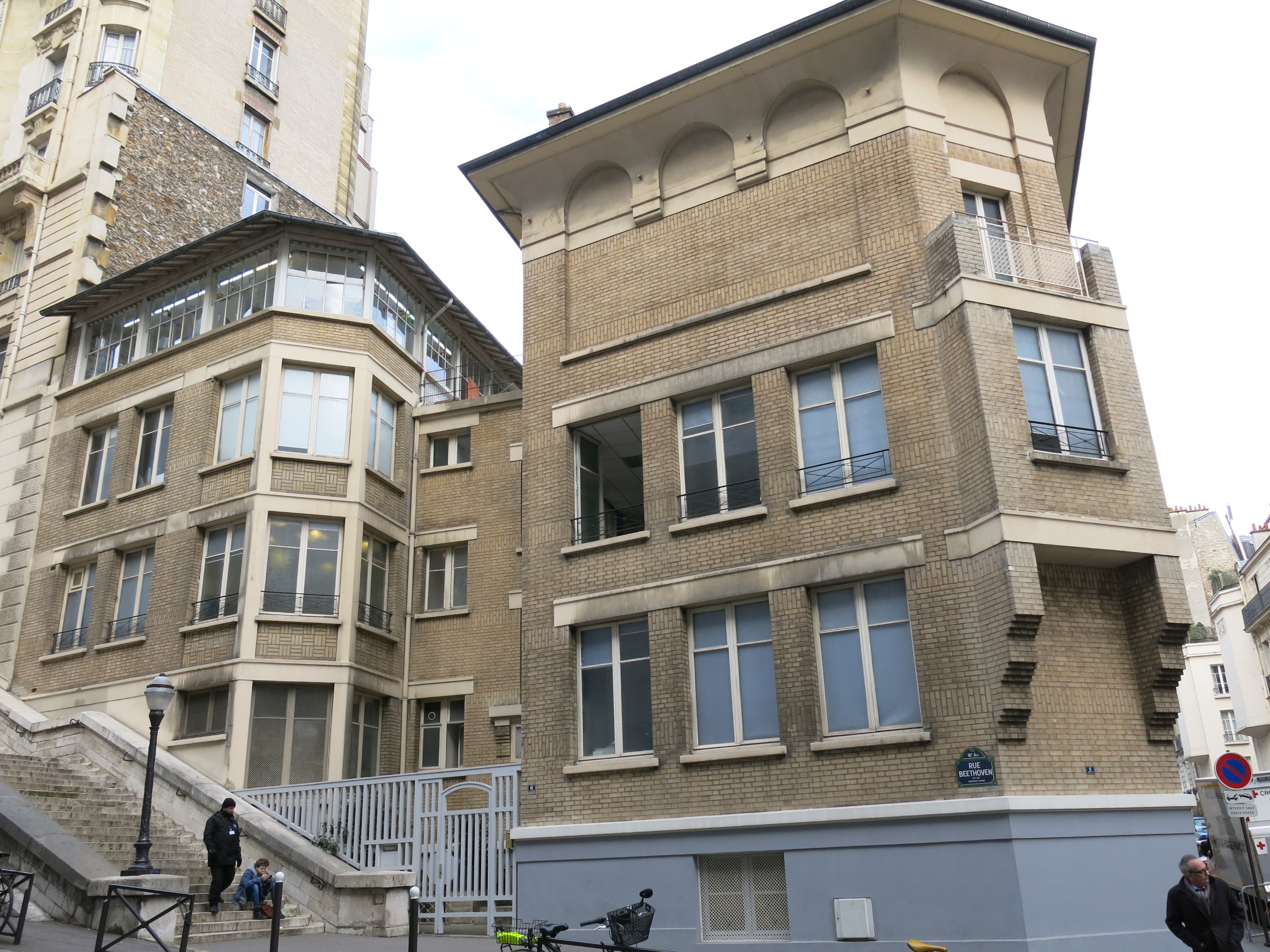
6 rue Beethoven, secondary school building and main office

The International School of Paris (ISP) is a private international school based in Paris, France. It is a non-profit organization, and is managed by a board of trustees. Many members of this board are parents of ISP students.

It was created under the name Pershing Hall in 1964. In March 2017, the school had approximately 700 students, representing over 60 nationalities and 50 native languages. ISP offers all three International Baccalaureate programmes: the IB Primary Years Programme, the IB Middle Years Programme and the IB Diploma Programme.

It is accredited by the Council of International Schools, the New England Association of Schools and Colleges (NEASC) and the International Baccalaureate Organization (IB).

== History ==
The school, founded by Monique Porter, who wanted an English-speaking school for her young daughter, began in a private building under the name of Pershing Hall in 1964. It started with 2 teachers and 8 students from 5 nationalities. Pershing Hall grew rapidly and soon expanded its curriculum from kindergarten to grade 8. Mrs. Jannick Jones, who started the school with Mrs. Porter, was the first Headmistress and gave the basic philosophy to the school. She taught mathematics and French, and at the same time was cooking lunch for the students on a gas stove.

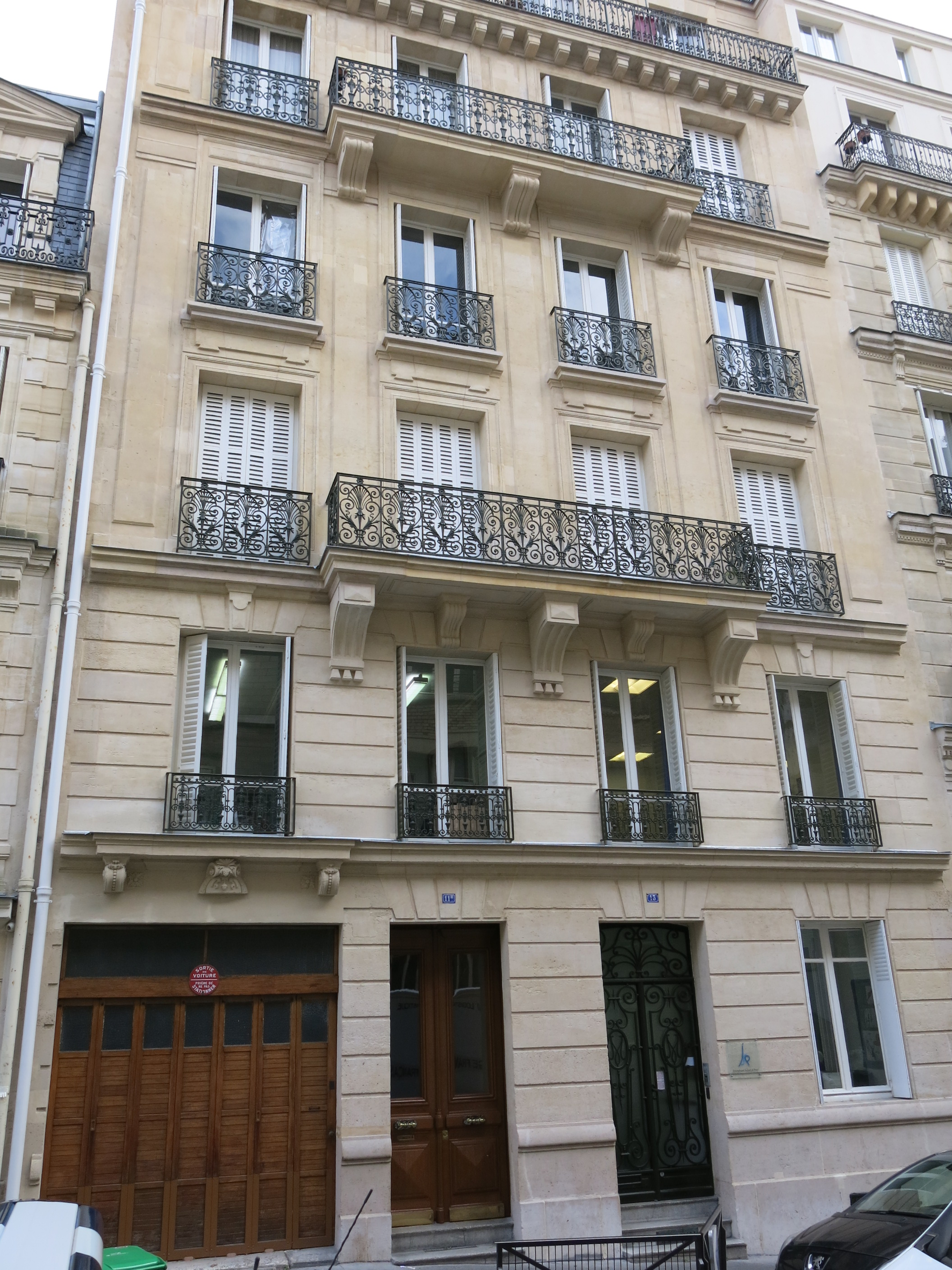
13 rue Chardin

In 1975, the School settled in 96bis rue du Ranelagh and changed its name to the International School of Paris. In 1983, ISP's middle and high school was moved into 7 rue Chardin. Finally, in 1985, the school expanded into 6 rue Beethoven, which was the former art school of the Musée des Arts Décoratifs, built around 1930.

In 1982 the school became an International Baccalaureate School.

In 1991 the school had 360 students, with the largest group being Americans. In 1992 the student body count was down to 335. At that year the Japanese became the largest group at the school, with 19% of the students. In 1992 Americans made up 15% of the students. In 1992 the annual tuition had risen to 74,750 francs, a 3% increase.

By 2004, the School had 483 students, and was running all three IB programmes (PYP, MYP and IB Diploma). Additional space was needed to accommodate the planned growth to approximately 650 students, resulting in the acquisition of two new buildings: 13 rue Beethoven for the Secondary School, and 98 rue du Ranelagh for the Primary School.

Today, the school enrolls approximately 110 teachers and 750 students representing over 70 nationalities and 52 languages.

== Campuses ==
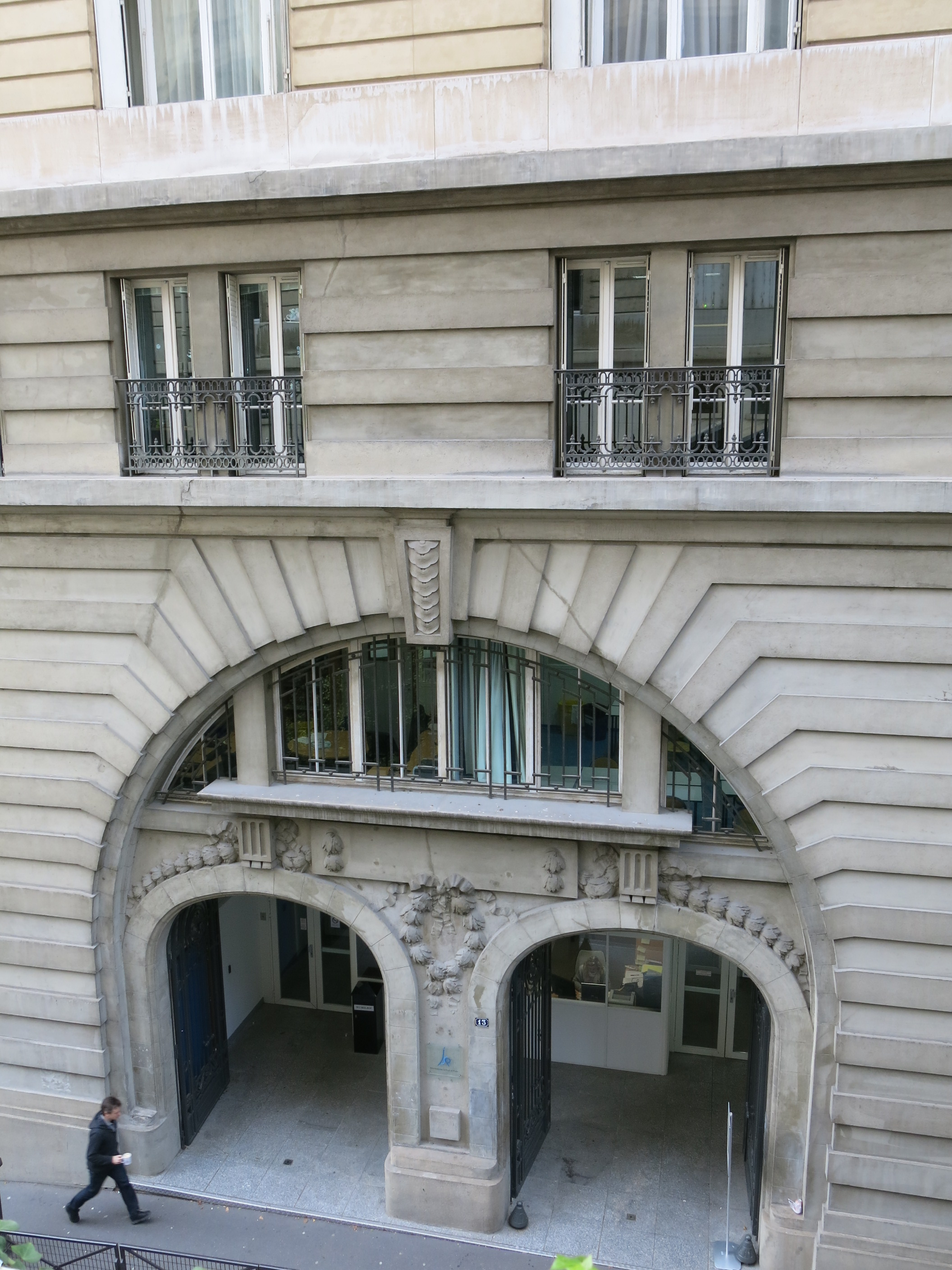
13 rue Beethoven, high school building

The school has three campuses in the 16th arrondissement of Paris. The primary school is on Rue du Ranelagh. The high school occupies two buildings in proximity, both on rue Beethoven. In September 2018, ISP opened a middle school campus on Rue Cortambert, also in the 16th arrondissement of Paris and closed the one on rue Chardin.

== Accreditation ==
The school is a non-profit, independent and co-educational establishment. Additionally, it is a fully accredited member of the Council of International Schools (CIS) and the New England Association of Schools and Colleges (NEASC). The school was re-accredited in 2011 by both organizations. The school is also a member of the National Association of Independent Schools and the European Council of International Schools.

== Demographics ==
In 2017 the school has approximately 60 different nationalities among the students, and no nationality represents more than 20% of the student body. Faculty and staff includes over 20 different nationalities. After 2020, the school enrolls approximately 110 teachers and 750 students representing over 70 nationalities and 45 languages.

In a 2013 interview, Audrey Peverelli, the former director of the ISP, stated that 15% of the students there were local French students, while the percentage was 5% when she started working there. Peverelli stated that possible reasons include a desire for their children to have an international education and a dissatisfaction with the public school system.

As of 2013 some students are members of Japanese families living in Paris.

== Facilities ==
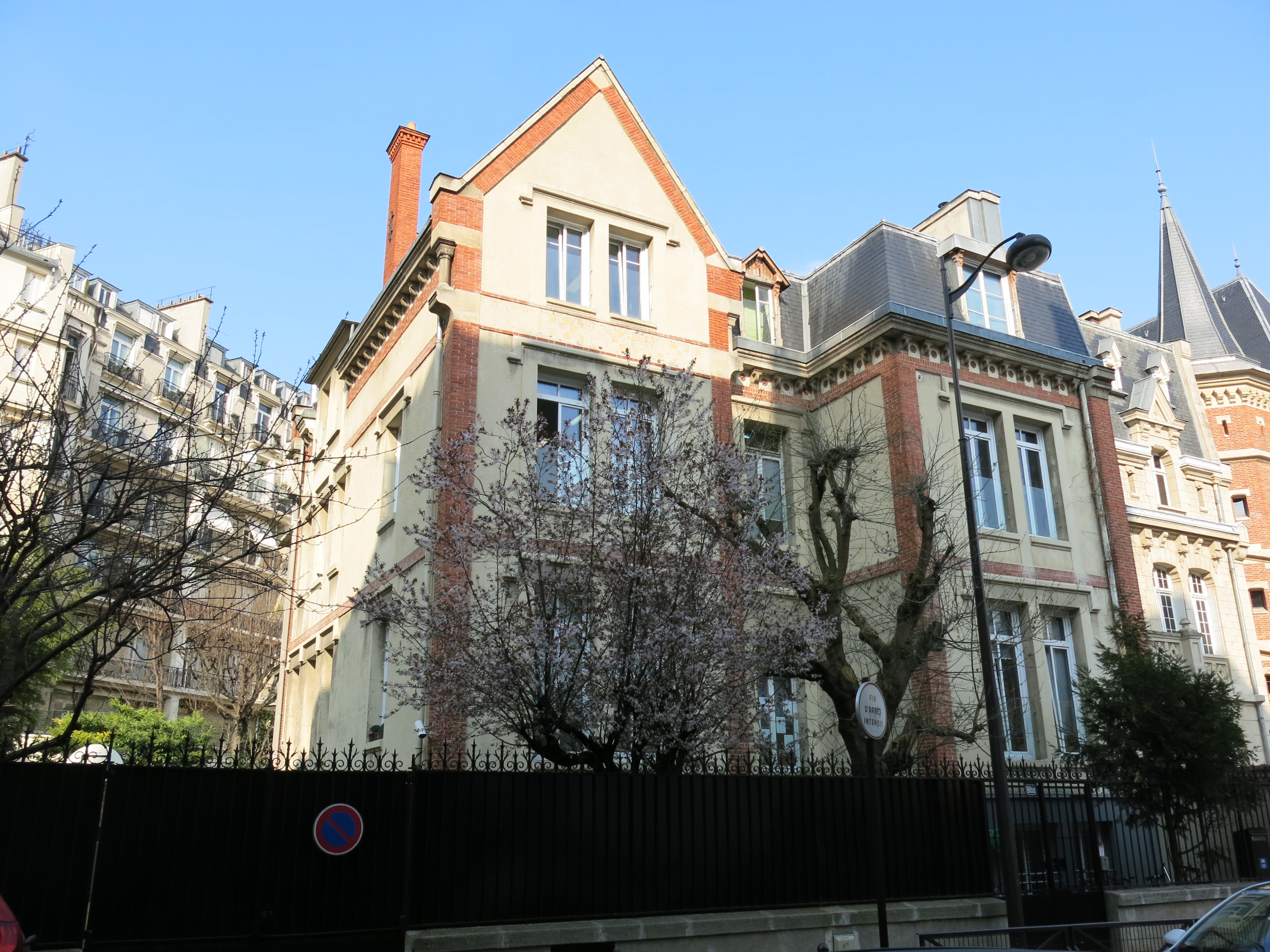
Primary campus

The International School of Paris is situated on three campuses in the 16th arrondissement of Paris, one on the rue Beethoven and the other on the rue du Ranelagh.

=== Primary school ===
Campuses in Paris

The primary school is housed in two renovated townhouses near the Ranelagh gardens. The houses are united by a playground with a separate section devoted to the youngest students.

In addition to classrooms dedicated to each class group, the Ranelagh campus is equipped with an art room, a music room, a library, a French library and a small gym.

=== Secondary school ===
The secondary school campus (rue Beethoven) is located across the river from the Eiffel Tower. The Beethoven Campus consists of three main buildings (one of which is a renovated art college), and some additional space in neighboring buildings.

The secondary school is also home to a library with a collection of 10,000 books in more than 12 languages, the most predominant of these being English followed by French, Japanese and Korean. It subscribes to 20 periodicals in French and English and to the online educational database Ebsco. There are 50 computers for students to use for research. Students also have access to the collection of the American Library in Paris at a reduced rate.

In addition to an on-campus gym, the school also uses local athletic stadiums, indoor gymnasiums, basketball courts, swimming pools, and a theater to enhance its P.E. and Arts programs.

The secondary school is also home to an 18-seat creative arts computer lab with 18 iMacs (21.5-inch screens) featuring Adobe CS5 software. This MAC lab was especially designed for the music, art and design technology students to use in their IB diploma classes.

The school also has its own newspaper club, called the Inquirer. The club covers many different issues, from history to modern day technology, business and electronics.

== Holiday Language Program ==
ISP's Holiday Language Program (HLP) offers courses in French and English on a weekly basis during the month of July to all students from ISP and elsewhere from ages 3 to 18. Its mission is to motivate students to learn French or English with a fun and interactive program.

Sessions are project-based in order to focus the various activities and fieldtrips around a common theme, which will promote meaningful language acquisition.

The themes are chosen to fit the interests and skill development of each age group and are all taught in French and English. The program includes language classes in the morning adapted to students’ ages and levels of expression in the given language and activities in the afternoon including music, art, sports club, photography and more.

In 2012, one week of HLP cost 445 Euros.

== Social media ==
ISP regularly posts memes and posts about Education for Complexity onto their Instagram account. Students are asked to submit their jokes and are credited for it, furthering their creativity.

== Notable alumni ==
- Andrea Casiraghi
- Lily-Rose Depp
- Ethan Mbappé
- Uffie - Dropped out of the school to sign with Ed Banger
- Morgane Polanski
