= Rodrigo Pardo García-Peña =

Colombian journalist, academic and diplomat

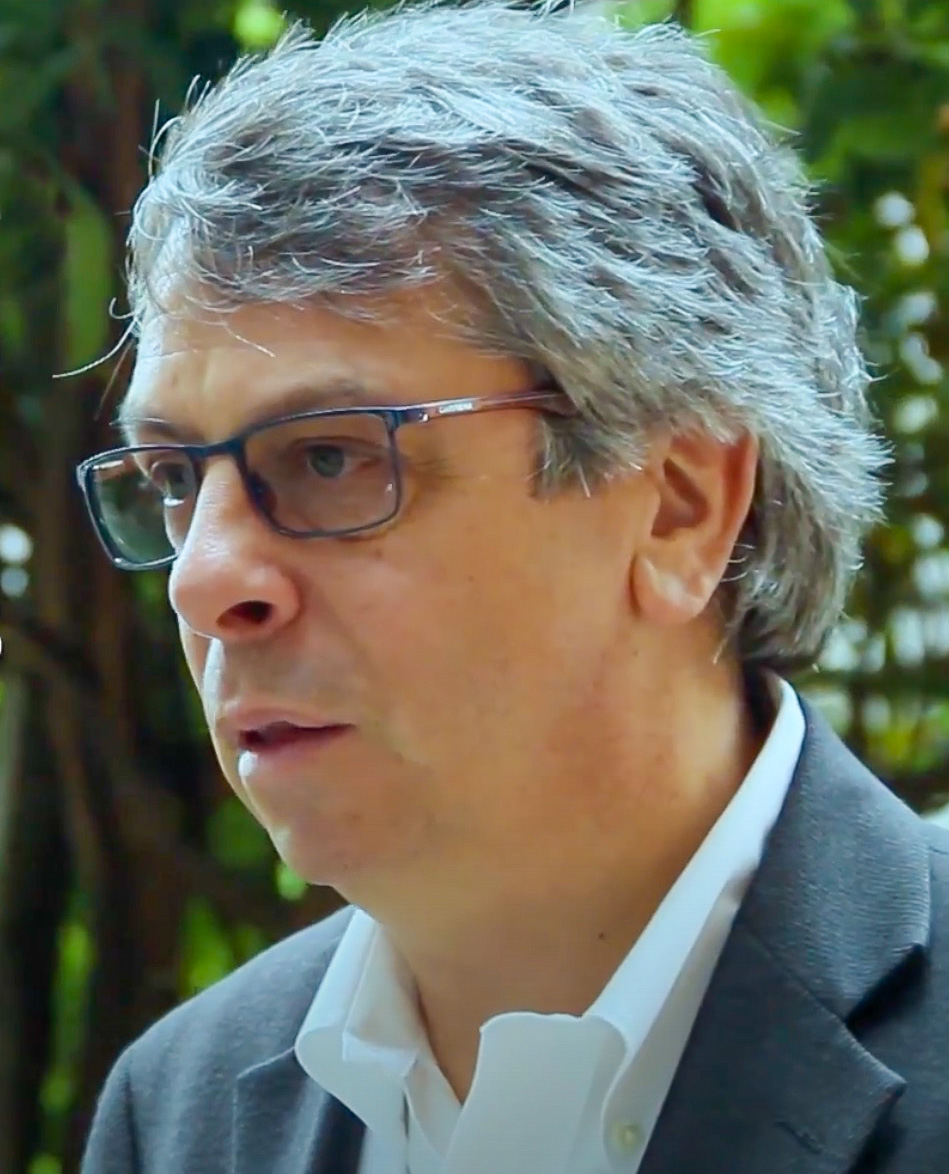
- Pardo in 2022

Minister of Foreign Affairs of Colombia
- In office 1994–1997
- Preceded by: Noemi Sanin
- Succeeded by: María Emma Mejía Vélez

Personal details
- Born: 15 November 1958 Bogotá, Colombia
- Died: 19 February 2024 (aged 65) Bogotá, Colombia
- Education: University of the Andes; Johns Hopkins University

Rodrigo Pardo García-Peña (15 November 1958 – 19 February 2024) was a Colombian journalist, academic and diplomat. He was deputy director of El Tiempo, director of El Espectador, of the defunct magazine Cambio. He was Minister of Foreign Affairs and ambassador of Colombia to Venezuela and France. He was the grandson of Roberto García-Peña, cousin of Roberto Posada García-Peña and Daniel García-Peña.

== Biography ==
Rodrigo Pardo attended high school at the Gimnasio Moderno, then studied economics at the University of the Andes and completed an MA in International Relations at Johns Hopkins University, SAIS, in Washington. He worked as a professor of Political Science at the University of the Andes, in the fields of international relations and Colombian foreign policy.

== Political career ==
In the first years of his professional career he was presidential advisor to President Virgilio Barco on international affairs. During the 1990 Colombian presidential elections he worked on the campaign of César Gaviria, who after winning, appointed him vice-minister of Foreign Affairs.

Two years later he was appointed ambassador to Venezuela, a position he arrived at in the midst of the crisis days after the first attempted coup against former president Carlos Andrés Pérez. In 1994, Ernesto Samper appointed him chancellor, and there he had to manage the country's difficult foreign relations in the midst of the Proceso 8000. In 1997 Samper appointed him ambassador to France.

== Journalistic career ==
In 1998 he was named Director of El Espectador after the Santo Domingo Group bought the publication. Pardo was not new to the journalistic world, since he had previously worked as an economic journalist in Semana and in Cromos. He worked at El Espectador for two years and from there he became general editor of El Tiempo, a newspaper at which later, in 2002, he was named deputy director. In 2004 he received the Simón Bolívar National Journalism Award for the best opinion column.

He was also editorial advisor for Semana magazine and in 2007 he became director of Cambio magazine, a publication that El Tiempo had acquired a year earlier. During his time at the magazine, Pardo and his journalistic team uncovered major scandals of the Álvaro Uribe government and several of the most important news stories of the year such as Agro Ingreso Seguro, the relations of the brother of the former interior minister Fabio Valencia Cossio with the Medellín Cartel and the secret negotiations over the United States military bases in Colombia.

In 2012 he was appointed as the director of Noticias RCN of RCN Televisión, replacing Clara Elvira Ospina. He resigned from that position in March 2015 to return to Semana in the role of editorial director. He also worked on radio, on the desk of the Voces ("Voices") RCN program and as an analyst on RCN Noticias de la muerte ("Death Notices"). Between 2012 and 2015 he directed and presented the television program "Dos Puntos con Rodrigo Pardo". In May 2015, this program received the Álvaro Gómez journalism award, for a debate on bullfighting.

== Personal life and death ==
His son Daniel Pardo is BBC Mundo's South America correspondent.

Rodrigo Pardo García-Peña died in February 2024, at the age of 65.
