= Nieves Zuberbühler =

Argentine journalist (born 1987)

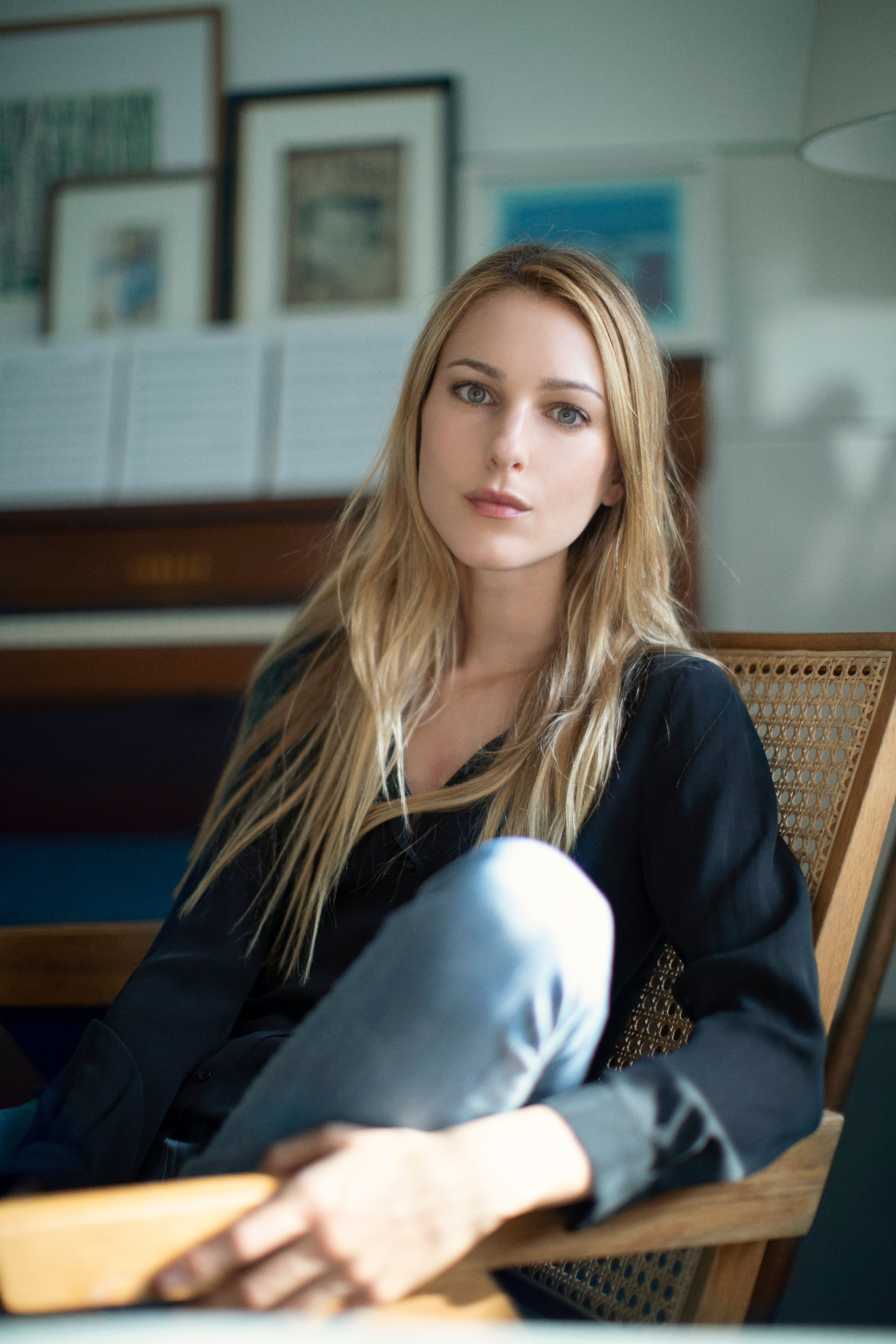
- Born: August 26, 1987 (age 39); Buenos Aires, Argentina
- Education: Austral University; New York University
- Occupations: Journalist; reporter; producer
- Television: (Argentina) Todo Noticias (Chile) Canal 13 (United States) CBS
- Spouse: Julio Mario Santo Domingo III (m. 2015; sep. 2017)
- Parents: Ignacio Zuberbühler (father); Marina Blaquier (mother)
- Relatives: Delfina Blaquier (cousin)

Nieves Zuberbühler (born 1987) is an Argentine journalist, reporter, and producer. She worked as an associate producer for 60 Minutes, where she interviewed the last surviving prosecutor from the Nuremberg trials, before working as a correspondent for Argentine news channel Todo Noticias. Zuberbühler is a recipient of a News & Documentary Emmy Award.

== Early life and education ==
Zuberbühler was born in Buenos Aires, Argentina in 1987 to Ignacio Zuberbühler and Marina Blaquier. Zuberbühler is a cousin of socialites Concepción Cochrane Blaquier and Delfina Blaquier. Her mother's family, the Blaquiers, are one of the wealthiest families in Argentina. She was educated at Northlands School and attended undergraduate studies at Austral University. She earned a master's degree in journalism and international relations at New York University.

== Career ==
Zuberbühler works as a journalist, news reporter, and producer. She was the recipient of a News & Documentary Emmy Award. In March 2016, as an associate producer for 60 Minutes, she interviewed the last surviving prosecutor from the Nuremberg trials. She began working for 60 Minutes in 2012 as an intern, when she proposed covering a story about young police informants in drug cases getting killed. Prior to working at 60 Minutes she was an intern at CBS. Since 2020, she works in the Argentine news channel, Todo Noticias, as a correspondent in New York.

== Personal life ==
A member of the Santo Domingo family by marriage, she is the wife of Colombian-American billionaire Julio Mario Santo Domingo III. Her husband is the brother of Tatiana Santo Domingo and son of Julio Mario Santo Domingo Jr. They were married in a civil ceremony in 2015. They married in a Catholic ceremony at the Church of the Visitation of the Blessed Virgin Mary in Red Hook, Brooklyn in October 2016. In 2017 she and her husband separated.
