= École Jeannine Manuel =

Coordinates: 48°50′52″N 2°17′28″E

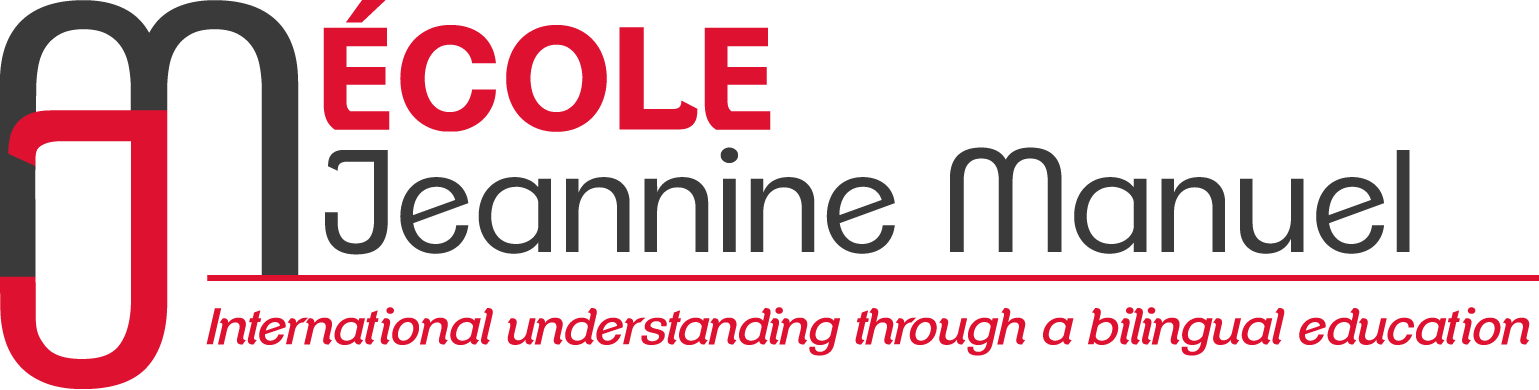
- 70 rue du Théâtre; Paris; France

Information
- Former name: Ecole Active Bilingue Jeannine Manuel
- Type: Private
- Established: 1954
- President: Bernard Manuel
- Director: Elisabeth Zéboulon
- Grades: Pre-K through 12th grade
- Campus: Théâtre, Suffren, Dupleix, Lille, London
- Affiliations: UNESCO, NEASC, CIS, IB
- Website: www.ecolejeanninemanuel.org

École Jeannine Manuel is a private and co-educational day school founded in 1954, with locations in Paris, Lille, and London.

The school's Paris campuses, located in the 7th and 15th arrondissement, are home to 2,400 students of 80 different nationalities. Its Lille campus, located in the town of Marcq-en-Baroeul, has more than 1000 students including 120 boarders. The Paris school was ranked the best high school in France for the eighteenth consecutive year in 2019, while the Lille school came in third place nationwide for 2019.

École Jeannine Manuel's London school opened its doors in 2015 in the heart of Bloomsbury. It currently has 700 students from Nursery to Year 13. Like its French counterpart, the London school offers a bilingual curriculum and its students sit the French and International Baccalaureate exams.

The school has over 20,000 alumni.

== History ==
=== Jeannine Manuel ===
Jeannine Manuel joined the French Resistance and became a member of the Free French in London in 1940. She returned to France in August 1944. In 1954, Manuel founded the Ecole Active Bilingue in a former townhouse on Avenue de La Bourdonnais in Paris. For Manuel, the aim of education was to help shape "whole" people, by which she meant "individuals aware of their presence in this world, engaged in its history, and ready to play a part in world affairs".

=== Expansion ===
The school opened its doors in September 1954 with 9 students enrolled, a number that grew to 100 by January 1955. The school continued growing at such a rate that, by 1960, there was a lack of available space to accommodate its growing student body.

Manuel consequently created special bilingual classes for her secondary students and teachers at the Lycée de Sèvres in collaboration with her friend, Edmée Hatinguais, who was Inspector General, former head of the École Normale Supérieure de jeunes filles de Sèvres, and the first director of the International Center for Pedagogical Studies (Centre international d’études pédagogiques). The bilingual curriculum and pedagogical approach offered at the Lycée de Sèvres closely mirrored that developed by Manuel.

Previous logo used when the school was named École Active Bilingue Jeannine Manuel (EABJM)

A few years later, Manuel opened a new school near Parc Monceau with the help of a new investor. However, in 1979, a conflict between a need for return on investment and Manuel's pedagogical principles led to an official split between the two schools. Manuel consequently left the school on the Parisian right bank but kept the two small schools on Avenue de la Bourdonnais and Avenue de Suffren. Manuel opened another school on 70 Rue du Théâtre in the 15th arrondissement of Paris.

In 1999, at Manuel's behest, her eldest son Bernard Manuel regrouped the recently opened school in Marcq-en-Baroeul (Lille) and the new Dupleix site in Paris into a single non-profit association together with the other pre-existing schools. Bernard Manuel remains president of the association.

=== Creation of the Fondation Jeannine Manuel ===
In 2004, one year after Jeannine Manuel's death, the Fondation Jeannine Manuel was established under the patronage of the Fondation de France. The Fondation's mission is to support École Jeannine Manuel and to encourage the development of other schools with a similar mission and pedagogical approach. They host a gala every year.

=== School renamed ===
In 2014, on the occasion of its 60th birthday, the school was officially renamed École Jeannine Manuel.

=== London campus ===
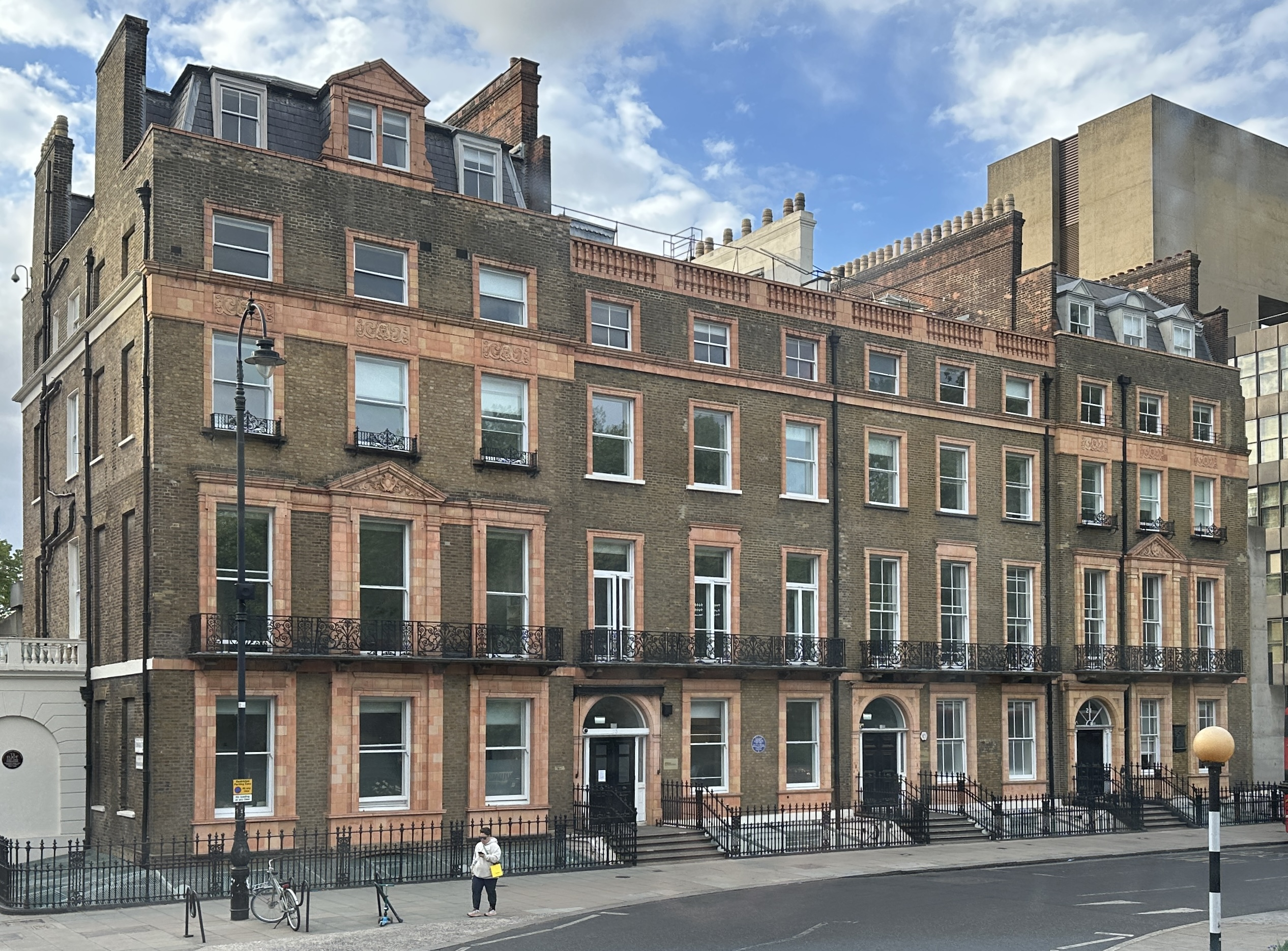
École Jeannine Manuel on Russell Square in London

In 2015, with the financial support of the Foundation and in honour of Manuel's formative years in London, the school opened its first site in Bedford Square, London. The Russell Square premises for the Upper School opened in 2019, and a new Primary School building opened on the south side of the square in 2022.

== Administrative structure ==
=== 1901 association & American International section ===
The school is a 1901 non-profit association and is under contract with the French state since 1959.

Both the Paris and Lille schools are official international sections. Students consequently have the opportunity of sitting the international (US) option of the French Baccalaureate (the OIB), a demanding bilingual and bicultural exam taken by only 1% of students sitting the Baccalaureate.

In 2010, Elisabeth Zéboulon, Director of École Jeannine Manuel, and Sean Lynch, Head of the American Section at the Lycée International of Saint-Germain-en-Laye, founded the Association of American International Sections (AAMIS) to help develop the OIB exam in schools. With Bernard Manuel as its president since 2012, AAMIS now includes more than 40 member high-schools that offer the OIB in Shanghai, San Francisco, Beirut, Johannesburg and other cities across the world.

=== IB World School with CIS and NEASC accreditations ===
With regards to international accreditations, École Jeannine Manuel was one of the first associated UNESCO schools, and has been an International Baccalaureate (IB) World School since 1980. The school is also accredited by the Council of International Schools (CIS) and the New England Association of Schools and Colleges.

== Diplomas and exams ==
- IGCSE First Language English and English Literature in Year 11
- Language certifications: Spanish (DELE – Instituto Cervantes), German (Goethe Institut Zertifikat), Italian (PLIDA – Società Dante Alighieri) B1 level in Year 10 and B2 level in Year 12, Chinese (YCT3 in Year 8, HSK3 in Year 10, HSK4 in Year 13).
- National Brevet Diploma with international option (DNBI) in Lille (US option) and in London (UK option)
- Entrance exams for UK and US universities
- French Baccalaureate with international option (OIB) – US section in France, UK section in London
- International Baccalaureate (IB)
- ASSR 1 & 2
- High School Diploma.

== Controversies ==
Since the creation of the Jeannine Manuel Foundation in 2004, the latter has enabled the school to raise 66% tax-free funds. Mediapart reported that the "platinum tables"—invitations to parties organised by the foundation—cost €3,400 after tax exemption, instead of €10,000. Lucie Delaporte, journalist at Mediapart, criticized this tax exemption at the expense of the taxpayer: "Is there really nothing more urgent than helping the schooling in the private sector of the most privileged upper classes?"

The salaries of contractual teachers are 15 times lower than those of some members of the management. Zéboulon, as head of the school and manager of the Remi company—a company that sells books to students and manages the school's extracurricular activities—has a monthly salary of €18,000 while contractual teachers earn the minimum wage. In addition, the president of the foundation, Bernard Manuel, benefited from the school's real estate acquisitions because, being the owner of the buildings through a Société Civile Immobilière, the rents are paid to himself.

According to an investigation led by the Journal du Dimanche, from 2017 to 2018, three employees have been diagnosed with a burnout syndrome. Gabriel Perez, a member of the Parisian Union of Private Education (SPEP-CFDT), described a "a system that controls its staff". In 2018, the labour inspectorate, after being alerted to the situation, opened an investigation and interviewed several employees, including Zéboulon.

== Notable pupils and parents ==
Many personalities from politics, business, fashion and the film industry have enrolled their children in this establishment.

- Nicolas Sarkozy and Cécilia Attias have enrolled their son.
- Natalie Portman, whose son was enrolled in the school.
- Jean-Luc Lagardère enrolled his son Arnaud Lagardère (born 18 March 1961).
- Jane Birkin and Serge Gainsbourg enrolled their daughter Charlotte Gainsbourg (born 21 July 1971) who enrolled with her partner Yvan Attal, their children.
- Sophia Loren enrolled her sons.
- Carla Bruni and Raphaël Enthoven have enrolled their son.
- Gaspard Ulliel - former student (born 25 November 1984).
- Princely Family of Monaco including Charlotte Casiraghi (born 3 August 1986).
- Santo Domingo family including Tatiana Santo Domingo (born 24 November 1983).
- Schlumberger family.
- Frédéric Mitterrand has enrolled his children.
- Alain Delon and Rosalie van Breemen, have enrolled their daughter Anouchka Delon (born 25 November 1990).
- Victoria Abril has enrolled her children.
- Antony Blinken, United States Secretary of State.
- Bouygues family.
- Jean-François Copé (former student) enrolled his children.
- Estelle Lefébure and David Hallyday have enrolled their daughter.
- Natalia Vodianova has enrolled her children.
- Esther Duflo has enrolled her children.
