= Magnúsdóttir =

Magnúsdóttir is an Icelandic patronymic meaning "daughter of Magnús". In Old Norse and Icelandic names, it is not a family name. Notable people with the surname include:

- Agnes Magnúsdóttir (1795–1830), last person to be executed in Iceland
- Áslaug Magnúsdóttir, Icelandic businesswoman
- Elín Rósa Magnúsdóttir (born 2002), Icelandic handballer
- Guðrún Kristín Magnúsdóttir (born 1939), Icelandic author
- Hólmfríður Magnúsdóttir (born 1984), Icelandic footballer
- Lilja Rafney Magnúsdóttir (born 1957), Icelandic politician
- Selma Sól Magnúsdóttir (born 1998), Icelandic footballer
- Sigrún Magnúsdóttir (born 1944), Icelandic politician
- Þóra Magnúsdóttir (born c. 1100;), daughter of King Magnus III of Norway
- Þórunn Elfa Magnúsdóttir (1910–1995), Icelandic writer
