= Muzungu Sisters =

British fashion company

- Industry: Fashion
- Founded: 2009

Muzungu Sisters is a fashion company founded in 2009 (launched in 2011) by Tatiana Casiraghi and Dana Alikhani. The word "Muzungu" is Bantu, meaning white.

== Mission ==
They "commission handcrafted goods" from artisans in obscure, far-out communities who otherwise might never have been discovered. They are a "sustainable" company that stresses "fair labor practices." With a focus on "fine craftsmanship, natural materials and traditional techniques", the founders are inspired by travel, friends, family and street style.

== The founders ==
=== Dana Alikhani ===
Dana Alikhani is Iranian and was born and raised in Cyprus. She holds a bachelor's degree in Social Anthropology from SOAS, and a master's degree from Columbia University in Human Rights. She focused her attention on ethical labour practices, an interest that eventually led her to the founding of Muzungu Sisters.

Before launching the company in 2011, Dana held positions at the United Nations High Commission for Refugees (UNHCR) and as a Middle East business risk analyst in London.

=== Tatiana Casiraghi ===
Tatiana Casiraghi, née Santo Domingo, is Brazilian on her mother's side, Colombian on her father's side, and married to Andrea Casiraghi, the eldest son of Caroline, Princess of Hanover. Casiraghi has a BFA in visual communications, with a concentration in photography, from the American University in London. She worked in fashion and publishing prior to business partnership with Alikhani.

== Headquarters ==
Muzungu Sisters Ltd. is based in London. They have a showroom at 242 Acklam Road. The retail is done primarily online, via their official website, and mass retailers like YOOX Net-a-Porter Group. However, the company does "pop-ups" periodically around the world. The first pop-up was held in London in November 2011.
