= Domingos =

Domingos is a Portuguese name.

== People ==
=== Surname ===
- Afonso Domingos
- André Domingos
- Antonio Domingos
- Bárbara Domingos
- Camilo Domingos
- Ederson Bruno Domingos
- Fabio Domingos
- Garcia Domingos
- Guilherme Afif Domingos
- Jônatas Domingos
- Laila Domingos
- Odete Domingos
- Pedro Domingos
- Raul Domingos
- Wagner Domingos

=== Given name ===
- Domingos Caldas Barbosa
- Domingos Chivavele
- Domingos Chohachi Nakamura
- Domingos Correia Arouca
- Domingos Culolo
- Domingos Duarte
- Domingos Duarte Lima
- Domingos Dutra
- Domingos Fernandes Calabar
- Domingos Gomes
- Domingos Gonçalves
- Domingos da Guia
- Domingos Lam
- Domingos Leite Pereira
- Domingos Lopes
- Domingos Malaquias de Aguiar Pires Ferreira, 1st Baron of Cimbres
- Domingos Manuel Njinga
- Domingos Mendes
- Domingos Mourão
- Domingos Paciência
- Domingos Puglisi
- Domingos Quina
- Domingos Ramos Freitas
- Domingos Repas
- Domingos Simões Pereira
- Domingos de Sousa
- Domingos Jorge Velho
- Domingos Gabriel Wisniewski
- Domingos Pires Ferreira (merchant)
- Domingos Pires Ferreira (priest)

== See also ==
- São Domingos (disambiguation)
- Domingo (name)
- Domingo (disambiguation)
