= Alejandro Santo Domingo =

Colombian American businessman (born 1977)

- Born: 13 February 1977 (age 49); New York City, U.S.
- Education: Harvard University
- Occupation: Financier
- Title: Managing director; Quadrant Capital Advisors; Limited partner; Washington Commanders (NFL)
- Board member of: AB InBev; Barefoot Foundation; Bavaria Brewery; British Museum; DKMS; Metropolitan Museum of Art; Mount Sinai Health System; WNET; Wildlife Conservation Society
- Spouse: Lady Charlotte Wellesley (m. 2016)
- Children: 2
- Father: Julio Mario Santo Domingo
- Relatives: Julio Mario Santo Domingo Jr. (half-brother); Tatiana Santo Domingo (niece); Lauren Santo Domingo (sister-in-law)
- Family: Santo Domingo; Wellesley (by marriage)

Alejandro Santo Domingo (born 13 February 1977) is a Colombian American businessman who manages the Santo Domingo Group, his family's conglomerate. He is a board member of several companies and organizations, such as Bavaria Brewery, Caracol Televisión, El Espectador, the Wildlife Conservation Society, the Metropolitan Museum of Art, the Bronx Zoo, the British Museum, and the Barefoot Foundation. Santo Domingo also owns a minority stake in the Washington Commanders of the National Football League (NFL). He is married to British socialite Lady Charlotte Wellesley and his net worth is estimated to be US$3.7 billion as of 2016.

== Early life ==
Santo Domingo was born on 13 February 1977 in New York City. He is the son of Colombian billionaire Julio Mario Santo Domingo and his second wife, Colombian socialite Beatriz Dávila. He is the brother of Andres Santo Domingo Dávila and half-brother of Julio Mario Santo Domingo Braga, who was the only child of Julio Mario Santo Domingo and his first wife, Brazilian socialite Edyala Braga. He was educated at the Hotchkiss School, followed by a bachelor's degree in history from Harvard University.

== Career ==
His work centers on managing the Santo Domingo Group, his family's conglomerate. He is also the managing director of Quadrant Capital Advisors, member of the AB InBev finance committee, chairman of Bavaria Brewery, director of the Colombian network Caracol Televisión and newspaper El Espectador, chair of the Wildlife Conservation Society, and board member of the Metropolitan Museum of Art, DKMS, WNET, Mount Sinai Health System, the British Museum, and the Barefoot Foundation.

In 2023, Domingo and some of his family were investors in a group led by Josh Harris that purchased the Washington Commanders, an American football team belonging to the National Football League (NFL), for $6.05 billion. The deal was the highest price ever paid for a sports team.

== Personal life ==
Santo Domingo holds American, Colombian, and Spanish nationality. He lives in Southampton, New York. During the years he has been seen with several famous socialite girlfriends, which have included heiress Amanda Hearst, editor Karen Larrain and models Eugenia Silva and Julie Henderson. In July 2015, he announced an engagement to Lady Charlotte Anne Wellesley, daughter of Charles Wellesley, 9th Duke of Wellington and Princess Antonia of Prussia, great-granddaughter of the late German emperor Wilhelm II. They were married in Íllora, Spain, on 28 May 2016. They have two children, born in 2017 and 2019.

He is a director of Colombia's Endeavor, an international non-profit development organization that aims to find and support high-impact entrepreneurs in emerging markets and is member of the Latin America Conservation Council of The Nature Conservancy.
