= São Domingos River =

There are several rivers named São Domingos River in Brazil:

- São Domingos River (Goiás)
- São Domingos River (Mato Grosso do Sul)
- São Domingos River (Minas Gerais)
- São Domingos River (Rio de Janeiro)
- São Domingos River (Rio Grande do Sul)
- São Domingos River (Rondônia)
- São Domingos River (Santa Catarina)
- São Domingos River (São Paulo)
- São Domingos River (Tocantins)
- São Domingos Grande River

== See also ==
- São Domingos (disambiguation)
