= María Emma Mejía Vélez =

Colombian politician and journalist

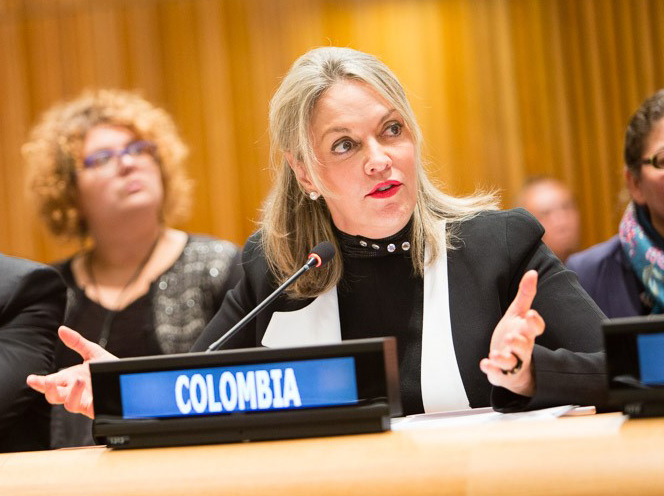

Permanent Representative of Colombia to the United Nations
- In office 18 February 2014 – 1 October 2018
- President: Juan Manuel Santos; Iván Duque
- Preceded by: Néstor Osorio
- Succeeded by: Guillermo Fernández

Secretary General of the UNASUR
- In office 9 May 2011 – 11 June 2012
- Preceded by: Néstor Kirchner
- Succeeded by: Alí Rodríguez Araque

Minister of Foreign Affairs
- In office July 1996 – 25 March 1998
- President: Ernesto Samper
- Preceded by: Rodrigo Pardo García-Peña
- Succeeded by: Camilo Reyes Rodríguez

Minister of National Education
- In office July 1995 – July 1996
- President: Ernesto Samper
- Preceded by: Arturo Sarabia
- Succeeded by: Olga Duque de Ospina

Colombia Ambassador to Spain
- In office May 1993 – May 1995
- President: César Gaviria
- Preceded by: Ernesto Samper
- Succeeded by: Humberto de la Calle

Executive Director at Barefoot Foundation
- In office 2003–2011
- President: Shakira Mebarak
- Succeeded by: Patricia Sierra

Personal details
- Born: María Emma Mejía Vélez; 27 September 1953 (age 72) Medellín, Antioquia, Colombia
- Spouse: Alberto Casas
- Children: Pedro Lucas Caballero

María Emma Mejía Vélez (born 27 September 1953) is a Colombian politician, diplomat, and journalist. She was the Permanent Representative of Colombia to the United Nations in New York. She served as Secretary General of the Union of South American Nations, Minister of Foreign Affairs, Minister of Education, Ambassador of Colombia to Spain, and member of the Foreign Affairs Advisory Commission of Colombia. Mejía Vélez was also a peace negotiator with FARC and ELN armed groups. For over a decade, she held the post of Executive Director to the Barefoot Foundation, a non-profit founded by Colombian singer-songwriter Shakira. Mejía Vélez also ran for vice-president and for mayor of Bogotá.

== Biography ==
After graduating from Universidad del Valle and Universidad Pontificia Bolivariana as a journalist, Mejía Vélez enrolled in cinematography and television studies at the BBC in London, where she later worked in the Latin American Radio Broadcast Service. Her first public post was as the Director of the Colombian National Film Institute (FOCINE) where she successfully achieved greater state support for the Colombian film industry.

In 1990, former President César Gaviria Trujillo named her as the head of the Presidential Advisory Office for the City of Medellín, where she gained national recognition for her social work in the most violent territories under the control of the drug cartel.

In 1993, Mejía Vélez became the first woman to be Ambassador of Colombia to Spain. In 1995, as the Minister of Education, she designed and implemented the first Colombian Decennial Education Plan and issued "Un Manual para ser Niño" written by Nobel laureate Gabriel García Marquez. As Minister of Foreign Affairs from 1996 to 1998, she was also the first woman to be designated as the Minister in Charge of the Duties of the Office of the President. In 1999-2000 she was a member of the Caguan Peace Process with FARC in behalf of the Government, and was a member of the civil society's Special Commission for the Negotiation with the National Liberation Army.

From 2003 to 2011, Mejía Vélez worked as executive president of Barefoot Foundation, a non-profit founded by the Colombian singer-songwriter Shakira and has been part of its board of directors ever since.

Mejía also served as chief of the Organization of American States Electoral Observation Mission in Paraguay in 2009 and Costa Rica in 2010. In 2011, she was appointed secretary general of the Union of South American Nations, where she led institutional strengthening through the creation of twelve sectorial committees, including the South American Defense Council, to address the most relevant issues among its Member States.

In 2014 President Juan Manuel Santos appointed her as ambassador to the United Nations in New York. Mejía Vélez was vice-president of the Economic and Social Council, one of the vice-presidents of the 70th session of the General Assembly and also the chairperson of the 71st session of the Third Committee on Social, Humanitarian and Cultural affairs. Additionally, Mejía Velez championed women's rights by creating the Group of Friends for Gender Parity and United Nations which as of March 2020 was integrated by 149 Member States.

== Permanent representative of the Colombian Mission to the United Nations in New York ==
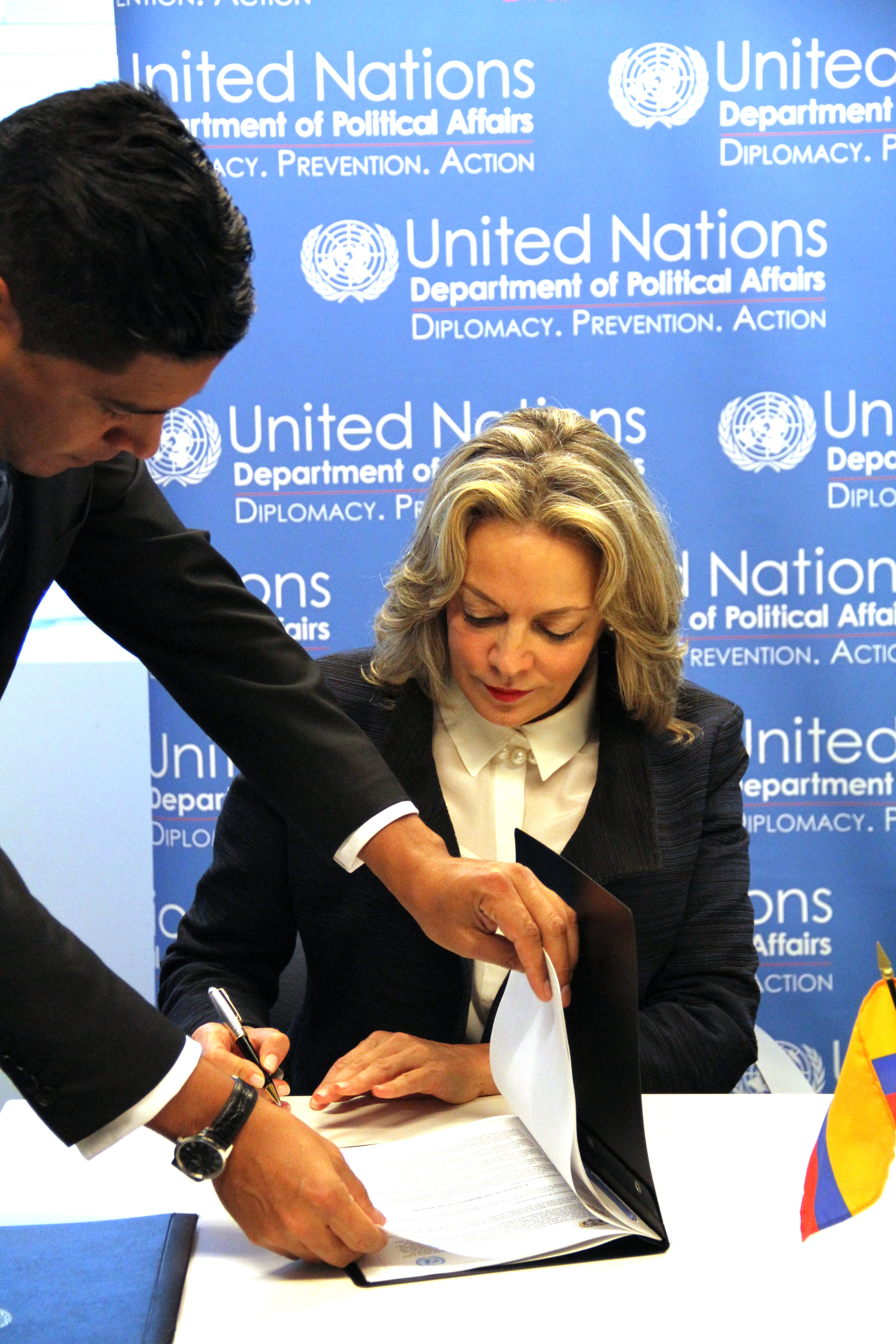

Mejía Vélez was appointed by former President Juan Manuel Santos as Ambassador Extraordinary and Plenipotentiary and Permanent Representative of Colombia to the United Nations in February 2014. She finalized her term on October 1, 2018 During the course of her more than four years in the diplomatic post, she was involved with the adoption of the Sustainable Development Goals, the Addis Ababa Action Agenda of the Third International Conference on Financing for Development (Addis Ababa Action Agenda), the reform of the selection and appointment process criteria of the United Nations Secretary-General, the establishment of a first Special Political Mission in Colombia and its Verification Mission, as a result of the peace agreement between the Revolutionary Armed Forces of Colombia, among many other achievements in a context of a cycle of reforms of the organization.

== Group of Friends for Gender Parity ==
The Group of Friends in Favor of a Woman Candidate for Secretary-General of the United Nations was a cross-regional initiative consisting of 56 United Nations Member States promoting the idea that the time for a woman to hold the highest position at the United Nations had come.

Mejía Vélez, in her capacity as Permanent Representative of Colombia, led in the spring of 2015 a group of like-minded countries to form a "group of friends" who would pursue to update the terms of reference for the selection and appointment of the secretary-general. This goal was achieved through negotiations within the Ad Hoc Working Group for the Revitalization of the General Assembly and its landmark resolution 69/321 "Revitalization of the work of the General Assembly." Adopted by consensus on 11 September 2015, operatives paragraphs 32 and 38 modified the seventy-years old language to explicitly call for "Member States to consider presenting women as candidates for the position of Secretary-General."

In late 2016, the group transitioned into a new and expanded phase for women leadership at senior level positions in the United Nations, for which it changed its name to Group of Friends for Gender Parity. In 2019, the Group achieved 149 Member States.

The group was mindful of the strategy and commitments made towards achieving gender parity, particularly in senior positions, laid out in the vision statement and during the informal dialogues by the Secretary-General Guterres. The group stood ready to support and work with Mr. Guterres to promote women's participation and advance women's leadership across the UN system. In order to achieve it, the group fostered open discussions on the necessary steps required to realize this goal. The group also emphasized the required steps needed to be taken towards achieving gender parity, with the ultimate goal of improving the current imbalance of women in senior leadership and comply with the extensive legal basis within the UN mandate on gender parity in United Nations leadership.
