= Delfina Blaquier =

Argentine socialite

- Born: November 20, 1980 (age 45)
- Occupations: Photographer, businesswoman, socialite, athlete
- Spouse: Nacho Figueras (m. 2004)
- Children: 4
- Parent(s): Eduardo Blaquier; Delfina Frers

Delfina Blaquier Frers (born November 20, 1980) is an Argentine socialite, photographer, fashion businesswoman, and former high jumper. A youth athlete in the 1990s, Blaquier competed internationally in the women's high jump. She was a gold medalist at the South American Youth Championships in Athletics in 1996, a silver medalist at the South American Championships in Athletics in 1997, and a two-time gold medalist at the South American Junior Championships in Athletics in 1997 and 1998. In 1998 she placed eighth at the World Athletics U20 Championships.

== Biography ==
Blaquier is the daughter of Argentine racing driver Delfina Frers and Eduardo Blaquier, a member of one of the wealthiest families in Argentina. Her father's family owns Estancia La Concepción, a large estate in Argentina. Her paternal grandfather, Juan José Silvestre Blaquier, was a polo player. Her maternal grandfather is the yacht designer Germán Frers. She grew up in Buenos Aires and at her family's estate. She is a first cousin of Nieves Zuberbühler and Concepción Cochrane Blaquier.

Blaquier was a competitive track & field athlete, representing Argentina while competing in the high jump. In 1996 she was a bronze medalist at the South American Junior Championships in Athletics and a gold medalist at the South American Youth Championships in Athletics. In 1997 she was a silver medalist at the South American Championships in Athletics and gold medalist at the South American Junior Championships in Athletics. In 1998 she was a gold medalist at the South American Junior Championships and placed eighth at the World Junior Championships in Athletics.

She married the polo player Nacho Figueras in 2004. They live in the United States and have four children: Hilario born in 2000, Aurora born in 2005, Artemio born in 2010, and Alba born in 2013. They launched a fragrance line at Bergdorf Goodman in 2019.

In 2018 she and her husband attended the Wedding of Prince Harry and Meghan Markle at Windsor Castle.

In 2007 she opened her first photography exhibition. She studied landscape architecture at university. In 2018 she partnered with Lucila Sperber and Sofia Achaval de Montaigu to launch the clothing line Àcheval Pampa.
