= San Domingo (disambiguation) =

Santo Domingo is one of the former names of Hispaniola.

San Domingo may also refer to:

- San Domingo (film), a 1970 West German drama film
- Santo Domingo Rebellion, a title sometimes used to refer to the Haitian Revolution (1791–1804)
- San Domingo School, a historic school building located in Maryland, USA
- San Domingo or Ruins of San Domingo, a settlements of the Portuguese in Gambia, West Africa; see History of the Gambia
- Fort Santo Domingo, sometimes known as "Fort San Domingo", a former Spanish fort in Taipei County, Taiwan, today the Tamsui District
- HMS San Domingo, a 74-gun warship launched in 1809 and sold in 1816
- HMS San Domingo, a planned Battle-class destroyer laid down in 1944 and then cancelled in 1945

== See also ==
- Domingo (name), a surname and given name
- Il furioso all'isola di San Domingo
- Saint Dominic, patron saint in which name is derived
- Santo Domingo (disambiguation)
- São Domingos (disambiguation)
- Domingo (disambiguation)
