= Northlands School =

School in Olivos and Nordelta, Argentina

Coordinates: 34.5045°S 58.4913°W

Information
- Motto: Friendship and Service
- Established: 1920; 105 years ago
- Founders: Winifred May Brightman and Muriel Ivy Slater
- Staff: 150
- Teaching staff: 450
- Gender: Co-educational; (1920-1923); Girls Only; (1923-1990s); Co-educational; (1990s-Present)
- Enrollment: c.2000 (2016)

Northlands School is a co-educational, non-denominational bilingual school with campuses in Olivos and Nordelta, Argentina.

== History ==
Northlands School was founded in 1920 by two English women, Winifred May Brightman and Muriel Ivy Slater, who had come to Argentina as governesses. Northlands opened with 16 students, both boys and girls, but three years later it stopped taking boys. Subsequently, it became a leading girls' boarding and day school popular with the diplomatic corps. In the 1990s the school became co-educational.

Miss Brightman was at the head of the School for forty years, until 1961, when she retired. She had been awarded the OBE in 1953 for services to education. Since then, Northlands has been run by a non-profit association: Northlands Asociación Civil de Beneficencia, from whose trustees the first Board of Governors was elected.

The School grew, greatly supported by the Headmistresses who followed the founders. The main buildings at school have been named after them: Brightman, Slater, Wallace and Parczewski, in memory of the work they carried out at Northlands. As of 2016, the two branches of the school have two thousand pupils, 450 teachers and 150 other staff.

The school is known for academic excellence. Its motto is “Friendship and Service”.

== Notable alumnae ==
- Cayetana Álvarez de Toledo
- Mónica Cahen D'Anvers
- Maria Gainza
- Mercedes Margalot
- Queen Máxima of the Netherlands
- María Eugenia Estenssoro
- Sandra Mihanovich
- Anya Taylor-Joy
- Nieves Zuberbühler

== Houses ==
- Keller (yellow): Helen Keller (named after)
- Fry (green): Elizabeth Fry
- Cavell (red): Edith Cavell
- Nightingale (blue): Florence Nightingale
