= Stefano Casiraghi =

Italian businessman (1960–1990)

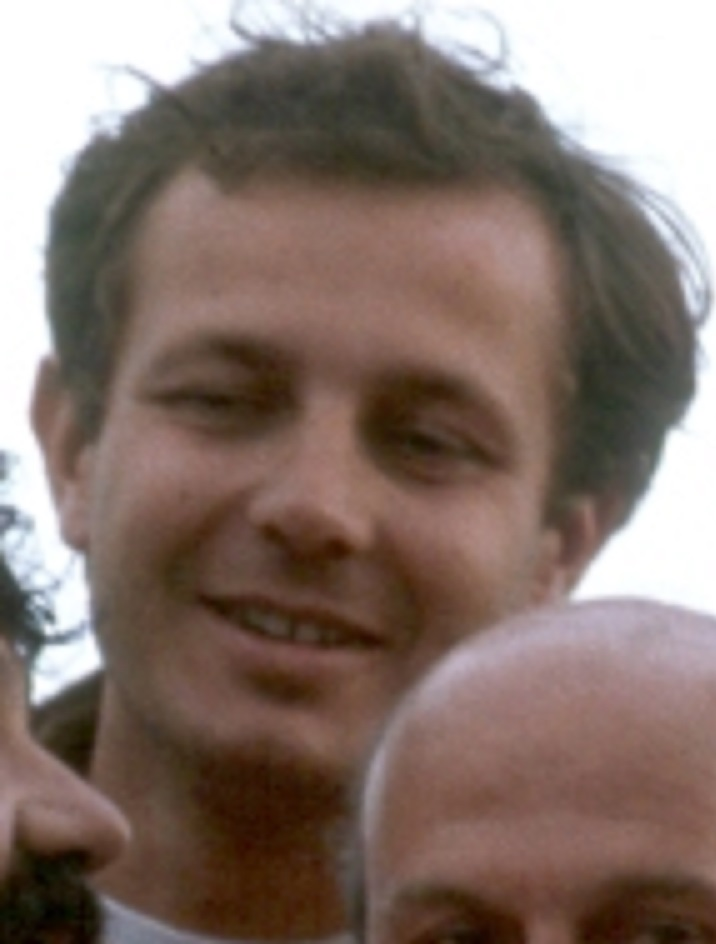
- Casiraghi in 1989
- Born: 8 September 1960; Como, Italy
- Died: 3 October 1990 (aged 30); Monte Carlo, Monaco
- Resting place: Chapel of Peace, Monaco
- Occupations: Chairman, Cogefar France; Founder/Majority shareholder, Engeco; World Offshore Champion
- Known for: Son-in-law of Rainier III, Prince of Monaco
- Spouse: Princess Caroline of Monaco (m. 1983)
- Children: Andrea Casiraghi; Charlotte Casiraghi; Pierre Casiraghi

Stefano Casiraghi (Italian pronunciation: [ˈstɛfano kaziˈraːɡi] 8 September 1960 – 3 October 1990) was an Italian offshore powerboat racer, socialite, and businessman. He was the second husband of Princess Caroline of Monaco; he died during a racing accident defending his 1990 Class 1 World Powerboat Championship title.

== Early life and education ==
The son of Giancarlo Casiraghi (1925–1998), a wealthy businessman, and Fernanda Biffi (1925–2024), Stefano Casiraghi grew up in the Casiraghi family's estate, Villa Cigogne, in Fino Mornasco. He had two brothers, Marco and Daniele (1956–2016), and one sister, Rosalba. He also developed an early passion for the speedboat races on Lake Como. He followed in the footsteps of his brothers by enrolling at Milan's Bocconi University, but left without obtaining a degree. He began to work for his father and his oldest brother, Marco.

== Business ==
Casiraghi was involved in the real estate and retail export enterprises of the family business that his father had built up. His obituary in The New York Times described him as a financier and Chairman of Cogefar France (a construction subsidiary of Fiat). The same source said he had a majority interest in Engeco, a Monaco-based construction company which he founded in 1984. At the time of his first child's birth, he was the director of the Christian Dior boutique in Monte Carlo.

== Speedboat racing ==
A throttle man, a role that requires control of the trim tab while observing water conditions to reach optimum speed, Casiraghi participated in eighty offshore races during his lifetime. Over a 20-year career, he won a dozen of those competitions and, at the time of his death, was the world champion of offshore speedboat racing, including the World Championship held off the coast of Atlantic City, New Jersey, USA, in 1989. Casiraghi had set the record (since broken) for 277 km/h on Lake Como in 1984.

== Marriage and family ==
On 29 December 1983 in Monaco, he and Princess Caroline married in a civil ceremony in the Hall of Mirrors of the Monegasque Princely Palace. They were not able to have a Catholic ceremony because Caroline had been divorced from Philippe Junot, and an annulment had not yet been obtained. However, as Caroline was over three months pregnant, the couple did not want to wait any longer.

The couple had three children: Andrea (born 8 June 1984), Charlotte (born 3 August 1986), and Pierre (born 5 September 1987). The children were born at Princess Grace Hospital Centre in Monaco, respectively, fourth, eleventh and eighth in the line of succession to the Monegasque throne, after their twin cousins and their mother. Although their parents had not married in the Church, as required for legitimacy under church law, they were legitimized by Pope John Paul II in February 1993, eight months after their mother's marriage to Junot was annulled in June 1992.

== Death ==
Casiraghi was killed in an offshore powerboat racing accident off the coast of Monaco near Cap Ferrat on 3 October 1990 while defending his world offshore title. He was 30 years old and had planned to retire after the race. Only weeks earlier, he had survived an accident when his boat blew up off the coast of Guernsey.

There were three to four-foot wave conditions on the race course, which caused Casiraghi's 42-foot catamaran, Pinot di Pinot, to flip. Traveling at ca. 150 km/h, it did not have a full canopy, and experts who studied the accident have said that Casiraghi would most likely have survived the accident had the boat been equipped with one. As a result of his death, safety laws became more stringent; a safety harness and closed hull became compulsory, as was a twin hull design for boats. Races now take place close to the harbour where waves are gentler, which is policed off for safety reasons as boats are no longer allowed to drive near the course.

Of the accident, Anne Edwards wrote that Casiraghi and his copilot, Patrice Innocenti, had been "trying to make up for time they had lost earlier in the race when they had stopped to rescue a pilot whose vessel had caught fire." Innocenti survived the accident. He was pulled from the water and taken to Monaco's Princess Grace Hospital.

Casiraghi's funeral was held in Monaco's Cathedral of St. Nicholas eight years after Princess Grace's funeral in the same place. Casiraghi is buried in the Chapelle de la Paix in Monaco, which is also the resting place of his wife's paternal grandfather, Prince Pierre of Monaco.
