= Delfina Frers =

Argentine race driver

Delfina Frers Serralunga Langhi (born June 25, 1960) is an Argentine racing driver. She has competed multiple times in the TC 2000 Championship. Since retiring from racing in 2010, she serves as the general manager of the Xirayas de San Luis–OPW women's cycling team.

Frers was born in Buenos Aires in 1960 to Germán Frers and Delfina Serralunga Pes. She competed as a racing driver from 1994 until 2010. She competed in forty-three races, winning two Since her retirement, she has been involved in sports, triathlon, cycling, managing the U C I Tour Femenino de San Luis, ladies international week of races She also serves as the sports director for the Argentine Women's Tour and the general manager of Xirayas de San Luis–OPW.

Frers is married to Eduardo Blaquier and has three children. Her daughter, Delfina Blaquier, was a competitive high jump record champion athlete.
