= Santo Domingo, Oaxaca =

Santo Domingo, Oaxaca may refer to:

- Santo Domingo Albarradas
- Santo Domingo Armenta
- Santo Domingo Chihuitán
- Santo Domingo de Morelos
- Santo Domingo del Estado
- Santo Domingo Ingenio
- Santo Domingo Ixcatlán
- Santo Domingo Nuxaá
- Santo Domingo Ozolotepec
- Santo Domingo Petapa
- Santo Domingo Roayaga
- Santo Domingo Tehuantepec
- Santo Domingo Teojomulco
- Santo Domingo Tepuxtepec
- Santo Domingo Tlatayapam
- Santo Domingo Tomaltepec
- Santo Domingo Tonalá
- Santo Domingo Tonaltepec
- Santo Domingo Xagacia
- Santo Domingo Yanhuitlán
- Santo Domingo Yodohino
- Santo Domingo Zanatepec

== See also ==
- Church of Santo Domingo de Guzmán (Oaxaca)
- Santo Domingo (disambiguation)
