= Barefoot Foundation =

Colombian charity in aid of poor children

- Fundación Pies Descalzos
- Founded: 1997; 29 years ago
- Founders: Shakira
- Purpose: Education
- Origins: Colombia
- Official language: Spanish
- Executive Director: Patricia Sierra
- Board of directors: Alejandro Santo Domingo; Bruce Mac Master; Enrique Narciso; Antonio Celia; María Emma Mejía Vélez
- Affiliations: University of La Sabana; Save the Children; Telefónica; la Caixa; Pontifical Xavierian University; ETH Zurich
- Website: fundacionpiesdescalzos.com

Barefoot Foundation (Spanish: Fundación Pies Descalzos) is a Colombian charity founded by Shakira in 1997, with the aim of helping poor and impoverished children. The Barefoot Foundation mission statement is "The Barefoot Foundation works to ensure that every Colombian child can exercise their right to a quality education. Our model targets displaced and vulnerable communities by addressing their unique needs."

The foundation's main focus is on aid through education, and the organization has five schools across Colombia that provide education and meals for 4,000 children. Shakira was honored with the Hero Award at the 2014 Radio Disney Music Awards for her work with the foundation.

== 2004 efforts ==
In 2004 the work of the Foundation turned to Shakira's hometown of Barranquilla. The Foundation built two new schools, Escuela Las Americas and Escuela Siete de Abril. The schools brought change to two neighborhoods that had been devastated by displacement, homelessness and poverty. The two Barefoot schools provided services for 990 children.

That same year, Barefoot initiated work in Soacha, Cundinamarca, a suburb on the outskirts of Bogotá. According to the Colombian Social Welfare Network, Soacha has one of the highest rates of incoming victims of displacement. Their work began at the Gabriel Garcia Marquez and El Minuto schools in the Altos de Cazuca neighborhoods, providing opportunities for another 980 children.

The year 2004 was significant for the Barefoot Foundation. They reached many of their goals, working with children whose lives were disrupted because of the Colombian conflict. Many children were given access to an education, better nutrition, and a new sense of hope. The foundation also initiated a school cafeteria that was managed totally by the neighborhood moms.

== Funding ==
Support for the foundation comes from contributions by Shakira and donations from national and international companies who care about social responsibility. They also work with multilateral corporations who endorse special projects and have formed alliances with government agencies. During February 2008, Shakira auctioned some of her tour clothes and guitars on eBay to support her foundation.

In February 2011, the FC Barcelona Foundation and Barefoot reached an agreement for children's education through sport.
