= Domingo =

Domingo may refer to:

== People ==
- Domingo (name), a Spanish name and list of people with that name
- Domingo (producer) (born 1970), American hip-hop producer
- Saint Dominic (1170–1221), Castilian Catholic priest, founder of the Friars popularly called the Dominicans

== Music ==
=== Albums ===
- Domingo (Benny Golson album), 1992 album by jazz saxophonist/composer Benny Golson
- Domingo (Gal Costa and Caetano Veloso album), an album by Brazilian artists Caetano Veloso and Gal Costa
- Domingo (Titãs album), a 1995 album by Brazilian band Titãs

=== Songs ===
- "Domingo" (song), the title song from Titãs' album
- "Domingo", a song by Yello on their album Stella

== Other uses ==
- Subaru Domingo, the Japanese market name for the Subaru Sumo
- Sunday, the first day of the week, called Domingo in Spanish and Portuguese

== See also ==
- San Domingo (disambiguation)
- Santo Domingo (disambiguation)
- Dominic
- Domingos (name)
