= Santo Domingo family =

Colombian-American business family

Santo Domingo
- Family business
- Country: Colombia; United States
- Current region: Americas
- Founder: Julio Mario Santo Domingo
- Current head: Alejandro Santo Domingo
- Connected families: House of Grimaldi; Wellesley; House of Hohenzollern
- Properties: Santo Domingo Group

The Santo Domingo family is one of the wealthiest Colombian families whose collective fortune makes them among the richest families in the Americas. Founded by Julio Mario Santo Domingo and headed by his son Alejandro, the family manages a conglomerate that controls over 100 companies. They are also primarily known for other activities in the beer market with Bavaria Brewery.

== Notable members ==
=== By birth ===
- Julio Mario Santo Domingo (1923–2011), patriarch of the Santo Domingo Group
- Julio Mario Santo Domingo Jr. (1958–2009), Colombian-American businessman
- Alejandro Santo Domingo (born 1977), Colombian-American businessman and current head of the group
- Tatiana Santo Domingo (born 1983), member of the Monégasque princely family
- Bettina Santo Domingo, American filmmaker
- Carolina Santo Domingo, American fashion designer

=== By marriage ===
- Lauren Santo Domingo (born 1976), American fashion businesswoman
- Nieves Zuberbühler (born 1987), Argentine journalist
- Lady Charlotte Santo Domingo (born 1990), British socialite

== Properties ==
- Caracol TV (Colombian television network)
  - Bluradio (radio station)
- Cromos (magazine)
- El Espectador (newspaper)
- SABMiller (brewery; 14% stake)
- Washington Commanders (NFL team; limited partner)
