= Áslaug Magnúsdóttir =

Icelandic businesswoman

Aslaug Magnusdottir
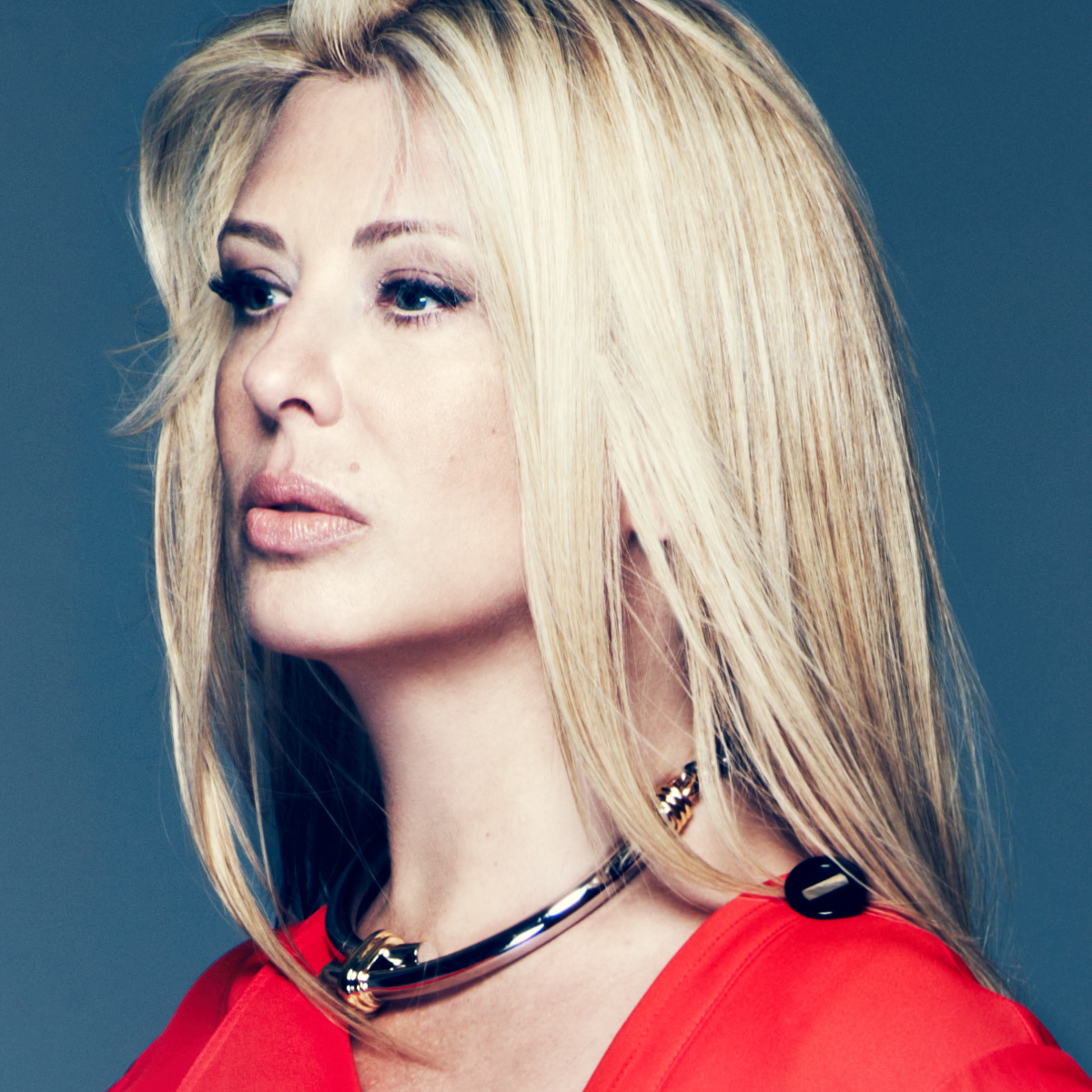
- Magnusdottir 2012
- Born: Reykjavík, Iceland
- Education: University of Iceland (Candidate of Law); Duke University School of Law (LL.M.); Harvard Business School (MBA)
- Occupations: Founder of Katla, co-Founder of Moda Operandi, TSM Capital, Tinker Tailor

Aslaug Magnusdottir is an Icelandic businesswoman and entrepreneur. Aslaug is the founder of Katla. She is the co-founder and former chief executive officer of Moda Operandi and a co-founder of TSM Capital. She has been dubbed "fashion's fairy godmother" by Vogue and one of the 100 Most Creative People in Business by Fast Company.

A Fulbright scholar, Aslaug holds an MBA from Harvard Business School, an LL.M from Duke University School of Law and a Candidate of Law degree from the University of Iceland.

== Family and education ==
Aslaug Magnusdottir was born in Reykjavík, Iceland, to parents Magnús Sigurðsson and Rakel Valdimarsdóttir. She has one brother, Sigurður R. Magnússon. Áslaug grew up in Los Angeles and Reykjavík and attended college at the University of Iceland, where she graduated in 1993 with a degree in law. She received a Fulbright scholarship and returned to the U.S. to attend the LL.M program at Duke University. She then earned an MBA from Harvard Business School in 2000, the first Icelandic woman to do so.

From 1993–2000, Aslaug was married to Gunnar Thoroddsen, a lawyer and former CEO of Landsbanki bank in Luxembourg. Gunnar is the grandson of Iceland's former Prime Minister Gunnar Thoroddsen, and the great grandson of Iceland's second President, Ásgeir Ásgeirsson. Together they have a son, Gunnar A. Thoroddsen,. From 2005-2015, Áslaug was married to nightclub owner Gabriel Levy. In 2022, she married tech entrepreneur Sacha Tueni. Their son is Ocean Thor Tueni.

== Career ==
Aslaug began her career in Iceland, where as a student she headed a modeling agency and was chairman of the National Ballet Company of Iceland, and then became a corporate and tax attorney at Deloitte. After completing her graduate studies, she moved to London, where she was an Engagement Manager at McKinsey & Company.

=== Fashion career ===
Aslaug first became involved in the fashion industry while helping to run a modeling agency during college. She started her professional career in fashion at Baugur Group, an investment company focused on the fashion and retail sectors. During her time at Baugur, Aslaug spearheaded a number of investments in early-stage fashion brands.

In 2006, Aslaug relocated from London to New York and joined Marvin Traub Associates as a Vice President. In 2007, she partnered with Traub, the former CEO of Bloomingdale's, to form an investment company, TSM Capital, which invested in designer brands such as Rachel Roy and Matthew Williamson. She later worked with actor and jewelry designer Waris Ahluwalia as President of his label, House of Waris Fine Jewelry. In 2009, Áslaug joined Gilt Groupe to head merchandising for Gilt Noir.

In 2009, Aslaug came up with the idea for Moda Operandi, a "pre-tailer" that lets consumers pre-order items directly from the runway. She shared the concept with Lauren Santo Domingo, and, together, they co-founded the company.

Aslaug left Moda Operandi in May 2013 after raising $36 million in a Series C round of funding from venture capital firms. With Matthew Pavelle, Gabriel Levy and Cleo Davis-Urman, she co-founded Tinker Tailor, a business that let consumers customize designer clothing or design their own. Tinker Tailor ceased operations in 2015.

In 2020, Aslaug launched Katla, a direct-to-consumer fashion brand that manufactures from environmentally friendly fabrics, including seaweed blends. In 2022, Áslaug was named Goodwill Ambassador for Fashion 4 Development, an organization established to support the United Nations Millennium Development Goals in cooperation with the office of the Secretary-General of the United Nations, Ban Ki-moon

== Awards and recognitions ==
- Fashion 4 Development Goodwill Ambassador in 2022
- Fashion 4 Development Award in 2022
- One of the BOF 500 in 2014 – The Business of Fashion
- One To World 2014 Fulbright Award for Outstanding Achievement
- One of the 100 Most Creative People in Business in 2012 – Fast Company.
- Among the 10 Game Changers of 2012 – Harper's Bazaar
- Among the Next Establishment in 2012 – Vanity Fair
- Fashinvest Award 2012 – Fashinvest
- One of Fashion's 100 Most Influential 2006 – Drapers
