= Pershing Hall =

Hotel in Paris, France

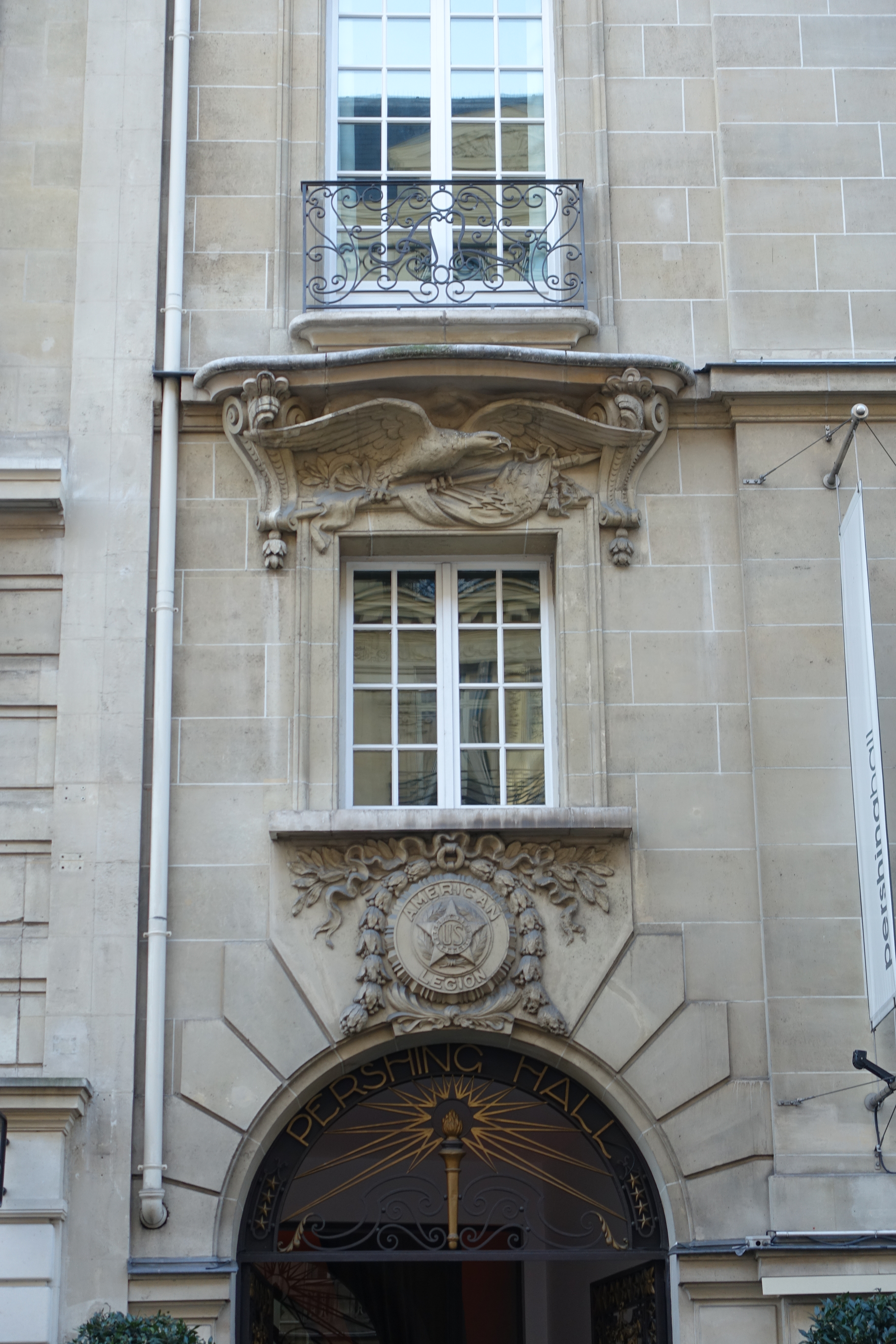

- Location within Paris
- Alternative names: American Legion Building, Pershing Hall Memorial

General information
- Location: 49 Rue Pierre Charron
- Coordinates: 48.8692°N 2.3025°E

References
- The Spirit of Pershing Hall, Charles S. Hart, Elks Magazine, January 1932

The Pershing Hall is a historical building and luxury hotel in Paris, France dedicated to General of the Armies John J. Pershing. The cornerstone of the building, which can be seen from the courtyard, is the identical keystone of the old Chateau-Thierry bridge which spanned the Marne at the point where the American troops turned the tide of the German advance on Paris.

== American Legion ==
The American Legion convention of 1927 authorized by unanimous resolution the creation of a memorial building in Paris. The resolution was as follows: "Whereas, a permanent American Legion Building in Paris containing appropriate memorials of the World War, and to be the center of American Legion activities would be another tie binding closer France with the United States". A corporation under the laws of Delaware with authorized capital of $320,000 was formed, with General Pershing, the American Ambassador Myron T. Herrick, leading officials of the Department of France, and a few notable civilians as incorporators. The title of the corporation is American Legion Building, Paris, Inc.

== Senate Bill 2917 ==
A hearing before a subcommittee of the Committee on Military Affairs, United States Senate, Seventy-Fourth Congress, First Session on S. 2917 was held on June 7, 1935. A bill authorizing an appropriation to the American Legion for its use in effecting a settlement of the remainder due on, and the reorganization of, Pershing Hall, a memorial already erected in Paris, France, to the Commander in Chief, Officers, and men of the expeditionary forces.

== Dept of Veterans Affairs ==
The House of Representatives passed H.R. 154 February 5, 1991. The Act in General states;” Pershing Hall, an existing memorial in Paris, France, owned by the United States, together with the personal property of such memorial, is hereby placed under the jurisdiction, custody, and control of the Department of Veterans Affairs so that the memorial to the commander-in-chief, officers, men, and auxiliary services of the American Expeditionary Forces in France during World War I may be continued in an appropriate manner and financial support be provided therefor.” They turned it into a hotel, and the Legion had to move. Its insignia still decorate the exterior of the building.

== Memorials ==
Bronze memorial tablets include:

- City of New York
- Princeton University
- Yale University
