= São Domingos do Cariri =

- Municipality
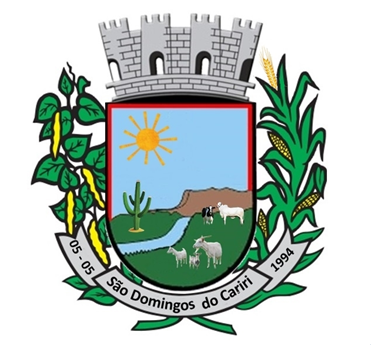
- Coat of arms

- Location in Brazil
- Coordinates: 7°38′9″S 36°25′58″W
- Country: Brazil
- Region: Northeast
- State: Paraíba
- Mesoregion: Boborema

Population (2020)
  - Total: 2,630
- Time zone: UTC−3 (BRT)

São Domingos do Cariri (Central northeastern portuguese pronunciation: [ˈsɐ̃w duˈmĩɡŭ du kɐɾiˈɾi]) is a municipality in the state of Paraíba in the Northeast Region of Brazil.

== See also ==
- List of municipalities in Paraíba
