= Julio Mario Santo Domingo =

Colombian-American billionaire businessman and diplomat (1923–2011)

1st Colombia Ambassador to China
- In office February 27, 1981 – March 18, 1983
- President: Julio César Turbay Ayala
- Preceded by: Position established
- Succeeded by: Alfonso Gómez

Personal details
- Born: October 16, 1923 Panama City, Panamá, Panama
- Died: October 7, 2011 (aged 87) New York City, U.S.
- Spouses: Edyala do Monte (divorced) Beatrice Dávila (m. 1975)
- Children: Julio Mario Jr.; Alejandro; Andrés
- Relatives: Tatiana Santo Domingo (granddaughter)
- Education: University of Virginia Georgetown University (dropped out)
- Net worth: ▲US$8.4bn (2011)

Julio Mario Santo Domingo Pumarejo (October 16, 1923 – October 7, 2011) was a Colombian-American billionaire businessman and diplomat. He is primarily known for his investments in Bavaria Brewery and for heading the Santo Domingo Family, one of the wealthiest and most influential families in Colombia.

In 2008, he was listed by Forbes magazine as the 189th wealthiest person in the world, and the second-wealthiest in Colombia, with a fortune of US$8 billion.

== Early life ==
Julio Mario Santo Domingo was born on October 16, 1923, in Panama City, Panama, to Mario Santo Domingo and Beatriz Pumarejo de Vengoechea, the youngest of their four children; his older siblings were Beatriz Alicia, Cecilia, and Luis Felipe. His father was a banker, described as austere and disciplined, who made a fortune buying companies weakened during the Great Depression; his mother, from a rich and influential family, was first cousin of Alfonso López Pumarejo who was twice President of Colombia. He grew up in Barranquilla and later attended the exclusive Gimnasio Moderno in Bogotá, D.C., ultimately culminating his secondary studies at the Phillips Academy in Andover, Massachusetts; he later attended University of Virginia before transferring to Georgetown University, but did not finish his degree.

== Ambassadorship ==
On May 26, 1980, President Julio César Turbay Ayala appointed Santo Domingo to be the first Ambassador of Colombia to China. He presented his Letters of Credence to Ulanhu, Vice Chairman of the Standing Committee of the National People's Congress, in Beijing on February 17, 1981.

== Santo Domingo Group ==
The Group has a majority stake in Bavaria Brewery and Valores Bavaria (a holding company for his non-beer interests). In 2005, Bavaria Brewery merged with South African company SABMiller. In this merging, the group acquired 15.1% of SAB Miller, becoming the second-largest shareholder of the second-largest beer company in the world (behind Anheuser-Busch InBev).

=== Portfolio ===
- Caracol TV (Colombian television channel)
  - Caracol TV International
  - Caracol Radio (sold to PRISA in 2001)
- Cromos (magazine)
- El Espectador (newspaper)
- SABMiller (14% stake)
- Avianca (sold in 2004 to Germán Efromovich)
- Bluradio (radio station)

== Personal life ==
He first married to Edyala Braga Brandão do Monte, a Brazilian socialite, daughter of Brazilian ambassador in Paris and former wife of Brazilian President Getúlio Vargas' brother. Together they had one son, Julio Mario Santo Domingo Braga (1958–2009), but the marriage did not last long and they divorced shortly after. Julio Mario Jr. married Vera Rechulski, a Brazilian socialite and they had 2 children – Tatiana Santo Domingo (born November 24, 1983) and Julio Mario Santo Domingo III (born May 2, 1985).

He remarried on February 15, 1975, to Colombian socialite Beatrice Dávila Rocha. Together they had two sons, Alejandro Santo Domingo Dávila (b. 1977), who has continued on in the family business, and Andrés Santo Domingo Dávila (b. 1978), the co-founder and president of Kemado Records. In 2008, Andrés married socialite Lauren Davis (founder of the online fashion retailer Moda Operandi).

Santo Domingo owned homes in New York City, in Paris, Bogotá, Cartagena and Barú, a Colombian island near Cartagena.
