= Domingos Gomes =

Brazilian footballer (born 1978)

Personal information
- Full name: Marcio Gomes Domingos
- Date of birth: July 19, 1978 (age 48)
- Place of birth: São Paulo, Brazil
- Height: 1.75 m (5 ft 9 in)
- Position: Striker

Youth career
- América
- Flamengo

Senior career*
Years	Team	Apps	(Gls)
2001	Club Sportivo Cerrito		
2002–2003	Atlético Clube Paranavaí		
2004	Toronto Lynx	8	(0)
2005–2006	Esporte Clube São Roque		
2007	Seleção Paulista De Beach Soccer		
- * Club domestic league appearances and goals

Marcio Gomes Domingos (born 19 July 1978) is a Brazilian former footballer who most recently played for Toronto Lynx in the USL First Division.

== Playing career ==
Gomes had stints with Atlético Clube Paranavaí and Club Sportivo Cerrito before going abroad to Canada to sign with the Toronto Lynx on July 21, 2004. He made his Lynx debut on July 25 in a 3-2 victory over the Calgary Mustangs. Under Duncan Wilde Brito was confined to the bench for most of the season, due to only appearing in matches for 45 minutes even when he started in the matches. Despite his efforts the Lynx failed to clinch a playoff spot, in total he appeared in 8 matches.

== Honours ==
- 2007: Paulista Vice Champion Paulista 2007
