= Estadio Santo Domingo =

Estadio Santo Domingo is the name of:

- Estadio Municipal de Santo Domingo, in Alcorcón, Spain
- Estadio Municipal Santo Domingo, in El Ejido, Spain
- Estadio Olímpico Félix Sánchez, in Santo Domingo, Dominican Republic
