= Andrea Casiraghi =

Member of Monegasque royal family

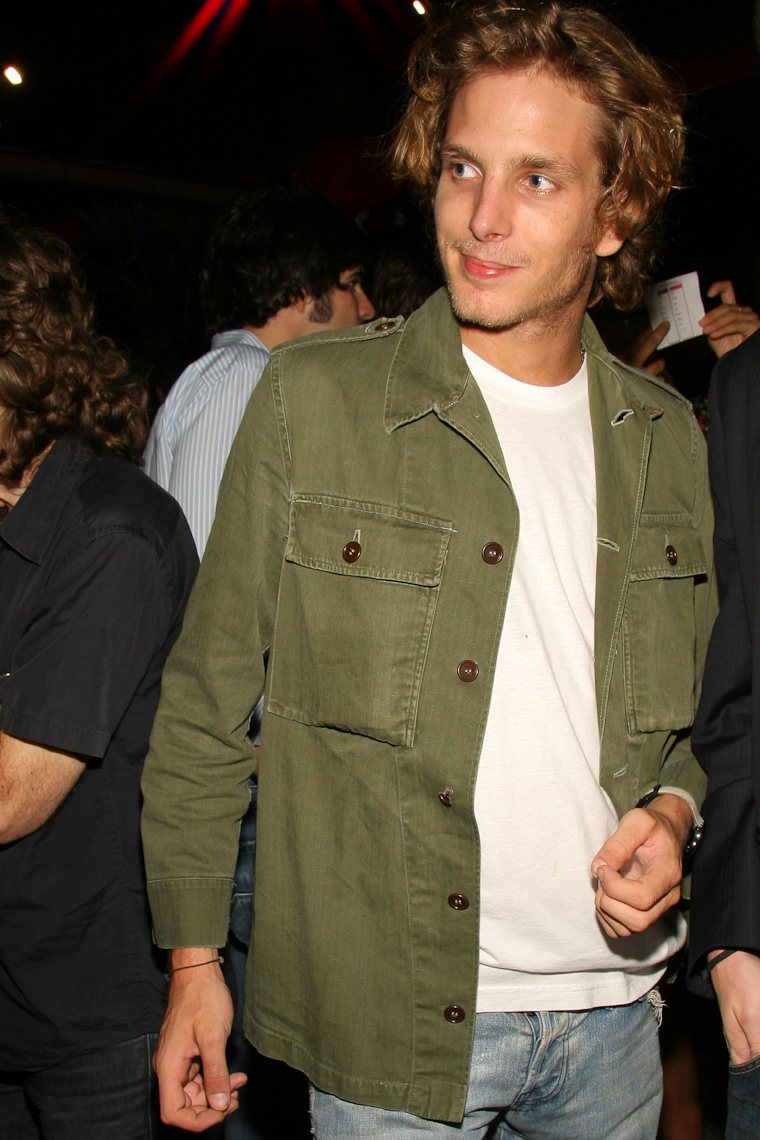
- Casiraghi in 2008
- Born: Andrea Albert Pierre Casiraghi; 8 June 1984 (age 42); Princess Grace Hospital Centre, La Colle, Monaco
- Education: International School of Paris
- Alma mater: American University of Paris; IE Business School (MBA)
- Occupations: Part-owner, Monacair
- Spouse: Tatiana Santo Domingo (m. 2013)
- Children: 3
- Parent(s): Stefano Casiraghi; Princess Caroline of Monaco
- Relatives: Charlotte Casiraghi (sister); Pierre Casiraghi (brother); Princess Alexandra of Hanover (maternal half-sister)
- Military career
- Allegiance: Monaco
- Branch: Compagnie des Carabiniers du Prince
- Service years: 2012–present
- Rank: Brigadier

Andrea Albert Pierre Casiraghi (born 8 June 1984) is the elder son of Caroline, Princess of Hanover, and her second husband Stefano Casiraghi. He is the eldest grandchild of Rainier III, Prince of Monaco, and US actress Grace Kelly. Casiraghi is currently fourth in the line of succession to the Monegasque throne, following his twin cousins and his mother.

== Family background and early life ==
Casiraghi was born on 8 June 1984 at the Princess Grace Hospital Centre in La Colle, Monaco, to Princess Caroline of Monaco and her husband, the Italian businessman and athlete Stefano Casiraghi.

The eldest grandchild of Rainier III, Prince of Monaco, and his wife, former American actress Grace Kelly, Casiraghi was named after his father's childhood friend, his maternal uncle Prince Albert and his maternal great-grandfather Prince Pierre, Duke of Valentinois. Casiraghi's godparents are his maternal aunt Princess Stéphanie and his paternal uncle, Marco Casiraghi. His sister Charlotte was born on 3 August 1986, and his brother Pierre on 5 September 1987.

On 3 October 1990, Casiraghi's father died in a speedboat accident in Monaco. He was buried several days later in Monaco's Chapel of Peace. Princess Caroline did not know how to tell her children that their father had died, so her father, Prince Rainier, did so. To protect her children from excessive media attention, Caroline moved to Saint-Rémy-de-Provence. In May 1999, it was confirmed that Casiraghi enrolled at school in Paris.

Despite his parents not having married in the Church, as required for legitimacy under church law, he and his younger sister and brother were legitimised by Pope John Paul II in February 1993, eight months after his mother was granted an annulment of her first marriage (to Philippe Junot) by a Pope's decree in June 1992, making him and his siblings dynasts and clearing the way for their possible succession to the throne of Monaco.

In 1999, his mother married Ernst August, Prince of Hanover, and gave birth to Princess Alexandra of Hanover. Besides a half-sister, Casiraghi gained two stepbrothers, Ernst August, Hereditary Prince of Hanover, and Prince Christian of Hanover, through his mother's remarriage.

== Education and career ==
Growing up mostly in France, Casiraghi earned his international baccalaureate in December 2002 from the International School of Paris, where his mother gave the commencement speech in June the following year, confirming that she had two sons enrolled there, Andrea and one of his stepbrothers. Following a period at McGill University in Montreal, Quebec, Canada, he eventually graduated in 2006 with a B.A. degree in visual arts and international politics from the American University of Paris.

He was an intern at the embassy from Qatar to Monaco, which, like most of Monaco's embassies, is based in Paris. In 2014, he started a Master of Business Administration at IE Business School (formerly known as Instituto de Empresa) in Madrid.

== Philanthropy and social activities ==
Since 2004, Casiraghi has been involved, to varying degrees, with the World Association of Children's Friends (AMADE), a philanthropic organization founded in 1963 by his grandmother Grace; it is currently chaired by his mother Princess Caroline. He spent eight months teaching children in Senegal, Togo, and Niger. In August 2006, Casiraghi visited Manila on behalf of a joint venture of AMADE and the Virlanie Foundation. Since 2007, he has been the patron of the Motrice Foundation, which funds research into cerebral palsy. Casiraghi was a guest of honor at the 149th Hospices de Beaune charity auction that was held in November 2009.

In 2011, Andrea bought a pair of loafers from a Tod's boutique in Milan. This shopping trip was well publicised for a reason. The following summer, he donated them to the Small Steps Project, which gives celebrity-worn shoes to the poorest children in the world.

In 2011, Casiraghi and his siblings Charlotte and Pierre hosted Monaco's annual Rose Ball, in the absence of Prince Albert, Princess Caroline, and Princess Stéphanie, who were mourning the sudden death of their aunt Princess Antoinette, Baroness of Massy, a few days earlier. Casiraghi gave the speech at the start of the event. The same year, he attended the wedding of his uncle Prince Albert and Charlene Wittstock, which took place on 1 and 2 July 2011.

== Personal and family life ==
In July 2012, Princess Caroline released a statement announcing that her son Andrea Casiraghi and Tatiana Santo Domingo had become engaged after a seven-year relationship. On 6 November 2012, Santo Domingo said in an interview for La Voz Libre that she was expecting her first child. She gave birth to a son, Alexandre Andrea Stefano "Sasha" Casiraghi, on 21 March 2013, at Portland Hospital in London, England. As his parents were not married at the time of birth, he was not then included in the Monegasque line of succession. However, due to their subsequent marriage their son currently occupies the fifth position in the line of succession to the Monegasque throne.

Casiraghi and Santo Domingo were married in a civil ceremony in the Princely Palace of Monaco on 31 August 2013. A religious ceremony was later held in Gstaad, Switzerland, on 1 February 2014. Their second child, a daughter named India Julia, was born in London on 12 April 2015. Their third child, a boy named Maximilian Rainier, was born in Monaco on 19 April 2018.

Casiraghi is fluent in French, Italian, Spanish, English and German. His hobbies and interests include reading, football, horse riding, water sports, skiing and collecting Swatch watches.

== Media ==
In December 2011, Casiraghi had his driving licence suspended after being caught speeding at 200 km/h near Lyon, France. Casiraghi is regularly tracked by the tabloids and paparazzi. The media nicknamed him as an "enfant terrible" and "rebel angel". In 1999, he was included in the People Magazine's "50 Most Beautiful People" list. In 2003, he was featured in a Town & Country article about young royals, and was voted the most stylish male royal by Hello Magazine's readers. In 2008, Forbes placed him the tenth on their "20 Hottest Young Royals" list.

== Honorary military appointments ==
- Monaco: Brigadier of the Compagnie des Carabiniers du Prince (20 January 2012 – present)

== See also ==
- House of Grimaldi
- Line of succession to the Monegasque throne
- Wedding of Albert II, Prince of Monaco, and Charlene Wittstock
- Funeral of Rainier III

Lines of succession
Preceded by The Princess of Hanover	Succession to the Monegasque throne 4th in line	Succeeded by Alexandre Casiraghi
