= Bavaria Brewery (Colombia) =

Colombian brewery company

Bavaria S.A.

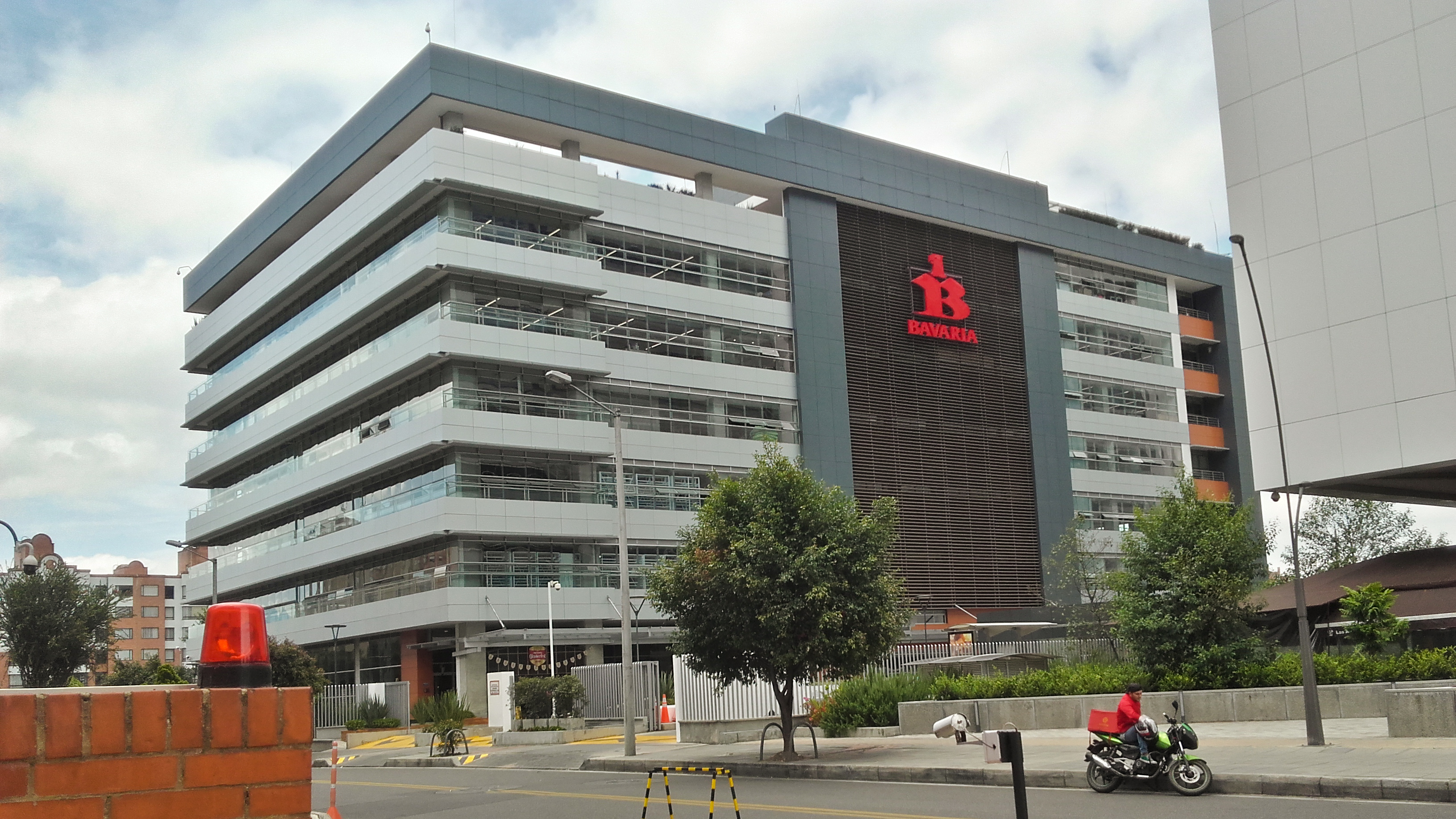
- Headquarters in Bogotá
- Trade name: Cervecería Bavaria
- Type: Subsidiary
- Industry: Beverages
- Founded: April 4, 1889 as Kopp’s Bavaria - Fabrica de Cerveza Alemana
- Founder: Leo S. Kopp
- Headquarters: Bogotá, Colombia
- Area served: Bolivia, Chile, Colombia, Costa Rica, Ecuador, Panama, Peru
- Key people: Alejandro Santo Domingo (chairman)
- Products: Beers, bottled water, fruit juices, malt beverages
- Number of employees: 16,369
- Parent: Anheuser-Busch InBev
- Subsidiaries: Águila Brewery; Andina Brewery; Leona Brewery; Unión Brewery
- Website: https://www.bavaria.co

Bavaria Brewery (Spanish: Cervecería Bavaria), formally known as Bavaria S.A., is a Colombian brewery company founded on April 4, 1889, by Leo S. Kopp, a German immigrant. In 2005, Bavaria Brewery became a subsidiary of SABMiller. Before the merger, Bavaria was the second-largest brewery in South America.

On 10 October 2016, Anheuser-Busch InBev acquired the SABMiller company, so SABMiller ceased to exist as a corporation and ceased trading on global stock markets, and Bavaria became a division of the combined company.

== History ==
In 1876, Leo Siegfried and Emil Kopp arrived in Santander seeking business opportunities. In 1879, with the brothers Santiago and Carlos Arturo Castello, they formed in Bogota the company Kopp y Castello, for the trading and importing of goods.

On April 4, 1889, the acquisition of a lot for the construction of a brewery was registered in Bogota. In 1890, the society Kopp and Castello was dissolved and was created the company Bavaria Kopp's Deutsche Bierbrauerei, which on 22 April of the following year recorded as factory image the German imperial eagle, and opened its headquarters in San Diego, downtown Bogotá, on 28 May.

In December 1911, during the centenary of independence, they used the figure of Policarpa Salavarrieta in their La Pola brand.

== Bottlers and brand names ==
Bavaria's products are produced in six breweries located in different cities of Colombia, including Barranquilla, Bucaramanga, Tibasosa, Medellín, Tocancipá and Yumbo. It also has two malteries, one in Cartagena and another one in Tibitó via Zipaquirá-Briceño, two labeling factories, and one tapas factory.

The national beers produced by Bavaria are Poker, Aguila Original, Aguila Cero, Aguila Light, Aguila Fusion Limón, Club Colombia Dorada, Club Colombia Roja, Club Colombia Negra, Club Colombia Trigo, Club Colombia Oktoberfest, Club Colombia Siembra, Azteca, Redd's, Pilsen, Costeña, and Costeñita. The imports it distributes are Corona, Budweiser, and Stella Artois. Their non-alcoholic drinks are marketed as Zalva Water, Pony Malta, Pony Malta Mini, Pony Malta Vital, Malta Leona, and Cola & Pola.

=== Beers ===
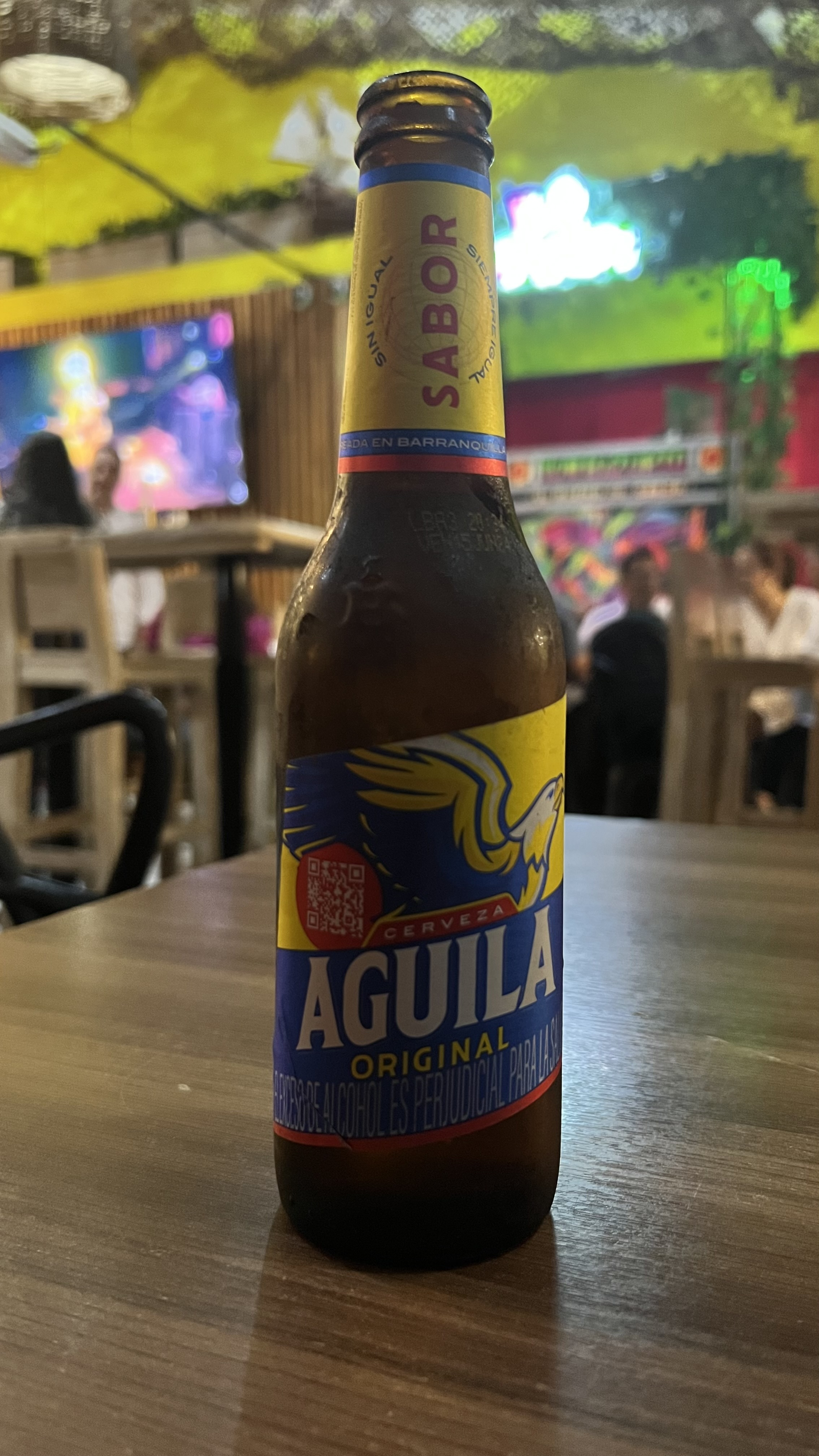
Águila pilsner bottle

- Águila (pilsner, 4% alcohol by volume)
- Águila Light (pilsner, 3.5% alc. vol., light variant of the above)
- Brava (pilsner, 6.5% alc. vol.)
- Club Colombia (pilsner, 4.7% alc. vol.)
- Costeñita (pilsner, 4% alc. vol.)
- Costeña (pilsner, 4% alc. vol.)
- Leona (pilsner, 4% alc. vol.)
- Pilsen (pilsner, 4.2% alc. vol.)
- Póker (pilsner, 4% alc. vol.)

=== Other brands ===
- Agua Zalva
- Malta Leona (high-energy drink)
- Pony Malta (energy malt beverage)
- Cola & Pola (refajo)
