= Julio Mario Santo Domingo Jr. =

Colombian-American businessman (1958–2009)

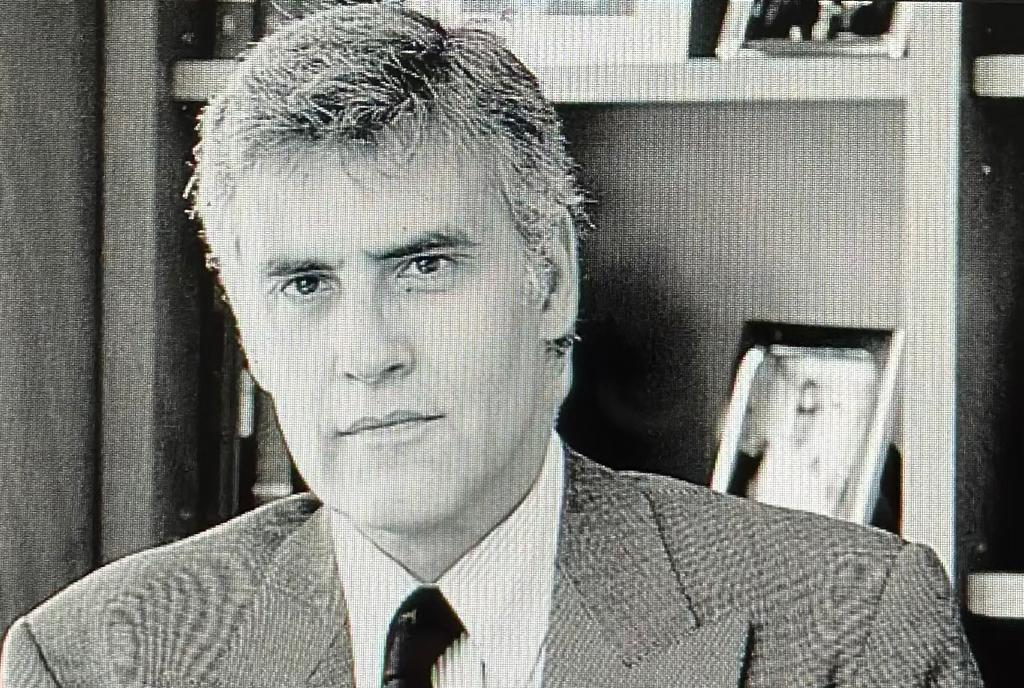
- Born: Julio Mario Santo Domingo Braga; 1958
- Died: March 2009 (aged 50–51); New York City, US
- Education: Columbia University; Panthéon-Assas University
- Occupation: Businessman
- Title: Founder and director, Santo Domingo Group
- Spouse: Vera Rechulski
- Children: 2, including Tatiana
- Parents: Julio Mario Santo Domingo; Edyala Braga Brandão do Monte
- Relatives: Alejandro Santo Domingo (half-brother)

Julio Mario Santo Domingo Braga (1958 – March 2009) was a Colombian-American businessman. He was the director of the Santo Domingo Group, his family's conglomerate of more than 100 companies.

== Biography ==
Santo Domingo was the first-born of the Colombian businessman Julio Mario Santo Domingo and the Brazilian Edyala Braga, of the same family as Eduardo Braga, former governor of the Brazilian state of Amazonas, and ex-wife of Benjamin Vargas, brother of Getúlio Vargas.

He studied literature at Columbia University and law at Panthéon-Assas University. Throughout his life, he was passionate about literature of all periods but especially French literature of the 19th and 20th centuries. He was a collector of printed books and manuscripts. He had a particular regard for Marcel Proust, but he also greatly admired and collected the works of Baudelaire, Rimbaud and Verlaine. He had huge collections of rock and roll and antique Chinese opium paraphernalia, and was an ardent fan of AS Saint-Étienne, a French soccer team.

== Personal life ==
He married Brazilian model Vera Rechulski and they had two children: Tatiana Santo Domingo (born 1983) and Julio Mario Santo Domingo, III (born 1985). At the time of his death, he was survived by his parents and half-brothers Alejandro Santo Domingo, a financier and the family's successor as director of the Santo Domingo Group, and Andrés Santo Domingo, a music industrialist.

Santo Domingo died in New York City from cancer, diagnosed in October 2008.
