= Moda Operandi =

Online luxury fashion retailer

- Company type: Private
- Industry: Fashion and leisure
- Founded: 2010
- Founder: Lauren Santo Domingo; Áslaug Magnúsdóttir
- Key people: Jim Gold (CEO); April Hennig (President)
- Website: modaoperandi.com

Founded in 2010 by Lauren Santo Domingo and Áslaug Magnúsdóttir, Moda Operandi is a New York-based e-commerce retailer carrying more than 1,000 brands and designers across fashion, fine jewelry, home and beauty.

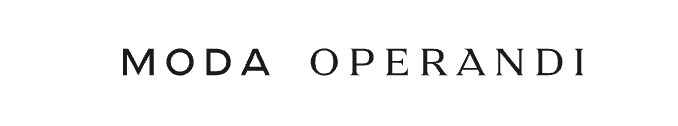
Official Moda Operandi brand logo

Originally conceived as an online trunk show business, Moda Operandi's founding proposition was to offer customers the kind of privileges previously only available to magazine editors: access to designers' full collections and ordering full looks straight from the runway. The business model attracted luxury shoppers worldwide. Through Trunkshows, which are live for a limited time, customers can secure items months in advance by placing a 50-percent deposit. The site offers access to designer pieces that might not become available in traditional luxury retail stores and provides valuable information to designers, who use sales data to inform which pieces they produce for each season's commercial collection.

Soon after, the company launched in-season fashion, giving customers access to available-now products. The retailer is known for its unique mix of established, contemporary, and emerging designers from around the world, as well as exclusive pieces, collaborations and capsule collections. Homeware launched in 2018 (followed by an in-house line, Moda Domus, in 2020). They started carrying a curated selection of beauty products in 2022.

Santo Domingo's point of view is central to the brand. "Lauren's Closet", a selection of pieces with her seal of approval, is the site's most visited and highest-revenue-driving edit page.

In January 2021, former Neiman Marcus executive Jim Gold was named interim CEO and was officially appointed to the position in May 2021.
