= Tatiana Santo Domingo =

Socialite, heiress and fashion designer

- Born: Tatiana Santo Domingo Rechulski; 24 November 1983 (age 42); New York City, U.S.
- Other name: Tatiana Casiraghi
- Citizenship: Monégasque; Colombian, U.S.
- Occupations: Socialite; heiress; fashion designer
- Spouse: Andrea Casiraghi (m. 2013)
- Children: 3
- Parents: Julio Mario Santo Domingo Jr.; Vera Rechulski
- Relatives: Julio Mario Santo Domingo (grandfather); Alejandro Santo Domingo (uncle)
- Family: Santo Domingo

Tatiana Santo Domingo Rechulski (born 24 November 1983), also known as Tatiana Casiraghi, is an American-born Colombian-Monégasque socialite, heiress and fashion designer. She is the founder of the fashion company Muzungu Sisters. She is married to Andrea Casiraghi, who is fourth in the line of succession to the Monegasque throne.

== Early life ==
Tatiana Santo Domingo was born on 24 November 1983 in New York and raised in Geneva and Paris. She is a member of the Santo Domingo family. Her father Julio Mario Santo Domingo, Jr. (1958–2009) was the son of Julio Mario Santo Domingo (1923–2011), who was cited as the second richest man in Colombia by Forbes in 2011. Her grandfather was owner of the Santo Domingo Group and the Colombian Bavaria Brewery, which was one of the largest breweries in South America. When he died in 2011, he left a sixth of his wealth to Tatiana Santo Domingo.

Her mother Vera Rechulski is a Brazilian socialite from São Paulo, who has a boutique in Paris that sells Indian antiques. Before opening her boutique in Paris, she ran a hotel in India for many years.

Santo Domingo attended the International School of Geneva and then enrolled at a boarding school in Fontainebleau, near Paris, where she was reported to have met her future husband, Andrea Casiraghi. However, according to Bob Colacello in a special spread for Vanity Fair entitled, "Fortune's Children," she also attended Institut Le Rosey and École Jeannine Manuel. Colacello also claimed that she holds a Bachelor of Fine Arts from American University in London. She earned her BFA in visual communications, with a concentration in photography, in 2005. In December 2006, Vogue reported that Santo Domingo was gearing up to begin art history studies at the graduate school-level in New York. The same month, Women's Wear Daily specified that she was enrolled at The New School in its report on a special Chanel Couture exhibition in Monaco.

== Career ==
Santo Domingo worked as an intern for Vanity Fair in New York City. She also worked for the Aeffe Group, the fashion label of Alberta Ferretti.

In 2011, Santo Domingo partnered with Dana Alikhani, daughter of the late Hossein Alikhani, to launch Muzungu Sisters, which focuses on ethical business practices that allow them support local artisans, buy handmade garments at a fair price and then sell them. Their brand has been supported by other socialites, such as Eugenie Niarchos and Margherita Missoni.

== Philanthropy ==
Santo Domingo supports several charity organizations, most notably the Motrice Foundation, which funds research into cerebral palsy and which her husband Andrea Casiraghi also supports. In August 2006 she and Casiraghi paid a visit to Manila on behalf of a joint venture of the World Association of Children's Friends and the Virlanie Foundation.

== Personal and media life ==
In 2010, Tatiana Santo Domingo relinquished her US citizenship, according to the Internal Revenue Service.

In July 2012, Caroline, Princess of Hanover, released a statement announcing that Andrea Casiraghi and Tatiana Santo Domingo became engaged after a seven-year relationship. Prior to their wedding, she had already accompanied Casiraghi at some of most important social events in Monaco, such as the Rose Ball, the enthronement of his uncle Prince Albert II of Monaco, the Monaco Grand Prix, and the wedding of Prince Albert and Charlene Wittstock.

Santo Domingo gave birth to a son named Alexandre Andrea Stefano "Sasha" Casiraghi, on 21 March 2013, in London, England. Casiraghi and Santo Domingo were married in a civil ceremony in the Prince's Palace of Monaco on August 31, 2013. A religious ceremony was later held in Gstaad, Switzerland, on February 1, 2014. Their second child, India Julia Casiraghi, was born in London on 12 April 2015. A third child, Maximilian Rainier Casiraghi, was born on 19 April 2018. The children are in the line of succession to the Monegasque throne.

Santo Domingo is known for her unique fashion sense, which varies from an elegant style to a vintage, boho-chic, hippie one. She cites Loulou de la Falaise as her style idol. She is fluent in Spanish, French, English, Portuguese and Italian. She is close friends with socialites such as Charlotte Casiraghi, Eugenie Niarchos, and Margherita Missoni.

=== Wealth ===
On the Forbes 2019 The World's Billionaires list, she was ranked #1349 with an estimated net worth of US$1.7 billion. However, Forbes has since reviewed the structure of inheritance of Santo Domingo's father, Julio Mario Santo Domingo, Jr, and has asserted that half of his estate was inherited by his widow Vera Rechulski Santo Domingo, Tatiana Santo Domingo's mother. Accordingly, Tatiana Santo Domingo has been dropped off their list of the world's billionaires, while her mother was added, holding an 11% ownership of the Santo Domingo family's Luxembourg-based holding company. The magazine also asserts that Tatiana inherited a 5% stake in the holding company, making her net worth around $500 million.
