= Lauren Santo Domingo =

American fashion businesswoman

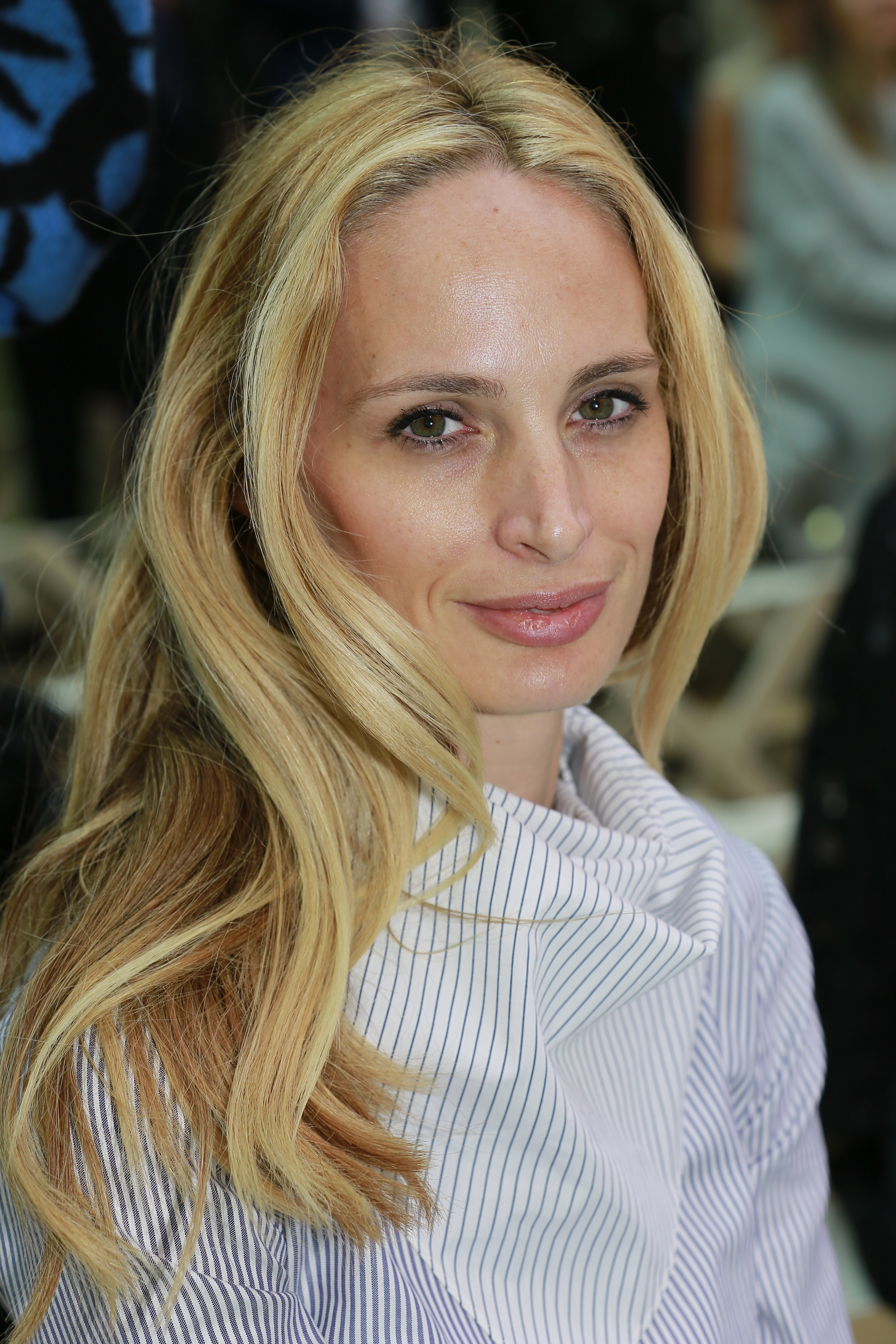
- Santo Domingo in 2014.
- Born: Lauren Davis; February 28, 1976 (age 50); Greenwich, Connecticut, U.S.
- Education: Kent School Greenwich High School
- Alma mater: University of Southern California
- Occupations: Businesswoman; editor; socialite
- Spouse: Andrés Santo Domingo (m. 2008)
- Children: 2

Lauren Santo Domingo (née Davis; born February 28, 1976) is an American entrepreneur, magazine editor, and socialite. She is the co-founder and Chief Brand Officer of online fashion retailer Moda Operandi.

== Early life ==
Lauren Santo Domingo, the daughter of Ronald V. Davis, the former CEO of the Perrier Group of America, and Judy Davis, an artist, grew up in Greenwich, Connecticut. As a model in her teens, she appeared in Sassy frequently, as well as in several commercials, including a Japanese TV spot with Brad Pitt. She attended the Kent School and graduated from the University of Southern California with a degree in history in 1998. While at USC, she was a member of Pi Beta Phi. After graduation, she moved to Paris.

== Professional career ==
Santo Domingo began her career at Vogue as a fashion assistant, eventually becoming associate fashion editor and then sittings editor, with a focus on American designers. She later served as public relations director for J. Mendel in Paris, where she helped launch the brand’s ready-to-wear line. She also led the public relations department at Carolina Herrera under the Puig Group. In 2005, Santo Domingo returned to Vogue as a contributing editor, a role she held as of 2018.

As a former American Vogue editor, she set out to create a platform that would allow women to shop from complete designer collections, a benefit only offered to editors or stylists at the time. In February 2011, she launched Moda Operandi with Áslaug Magnúsdóttir, changing the way the fashion industry and people shop. The company now has more than 300 employees across eight offices globally, and has raised nearly $300m in funding from top-tier investors.

In March 2023 Santo Domingo was introduced as the Creative Director of the home collection for Tiffany & Co.

== Personal life ==
Considered one of the "100 most influential New Yorkers of the past 25 years" by The New York Observer, Santo Domingo was inducted into Vanity Fair's International Best Dressed List Hall of Fame in 2017.

Santo Domingo is a fundraiser for Democratic political candidates including Hillary Clinton and Kamala Harris.

She is married to Colombian-American billionaire businessman Andrés Santo Domingo, who is the youngest son of late business magnate Julio Mario Santo Domingo, and the co-owner of independent record label Mexican Summer. The couple met in 1998 in Paris. Through her husband, she is a member of the wealthy Colombian-American Santo Domingo family. She has described her husband as being "supportive of everything I do."

Santo Domingo lives in New York City with her husband and their two children.

=== Wedding ===
Lauren Santo Domingo’s 2008 wedding to Andrés Santo Domingo in Cartagena, Colombia, was featured as “the wedding of the year” by Vogue with a ten-page spread, custom designer dresses, and high-profile guests, and later appeared on the cover of Vogue Weddings.
