= Jim Chandler =

American poet

Jimmy Lee Chandler (July 19, 1941 – August 10, 2017) was a Southern poet (see Southern literature) and novelist from Tennessee. Chandler's poetry evolved from the post-Beat Generation through the underground scene. His 276-page poetry collection Smoke & Thunder, was published in 2003. In 2006 he published his first novel, Parallel Blues.

== Poetry and prose ==
Chandler's works of poetry and prose have been published in a variety of magazines, newspapers and e-zines. Most notably, his poetry earned a coveted role in The Outlaw Bible of American Poetry anthology, edited by Alan Kaufman and S. A. Griffin, in 1999. The 685-page Outlaw Bible gives voice to unconventional poets from the beat poetry of the 1950s to the current age.

Chandler is included in the Tennessee State Library and Archives' Bibliography of Tennessee Local History Sources, Tennessee Authors of Adult Fiction, Poetry & Drama: 1970's - Present. Additionally, four of his poetry collections are cataloged in the Brown University library.

Chandler's poems, almost without fail, are autobiographical in nature, as are most of his stories, while others are based on characters he's known in settings with which he is familiar.

"In short, I basically write what I know about, which is, or should be, the first rule of writing ... [M]ost of my poetry is of the 'meat' poet school-that is, it has its roots in reality, in happenings and occurrences. I'm a firm believer in that old adage, 'write what you know.' And what do we know better than the things we've been a part of?" (The McKenzie Banner, article chronicling his inclusion into the Tennessee State Library and Archives).

Chandler was the editor and publisher of Thunder Sandwich, an online magazine that featured the works of select writers of prose and poetry.

== Journalism ==
Chandler worked as a journalist for the Suburban News Bureau in St. Louis, Missouri, before returning to Tennessee in 1985, where for 15 years he was a reporter for The McKenzie Banner .

As a reporter for The McKenzie Banner, Chandler covered the murder of Dennis Brooks Jr. in Huntingdon, Tennessee. He later wrote a book about the murder entitled Death on a Dark Highway: The Murder of Dennis Brooks, Jr.

Chandler was featured in an episode of the WE series Women Behind Bars. He was interviewed as a true crime writer and expert on the Brooks murder case.

== Bibliography ==
- work in Desert Poet 1978/1980
- work in Glyph 1981
- Kid Games (book) 1984
- work in Open 24 Hours 1984
- work in Parnassus 1984
- work in Rawbone 1984
- work in Impetus 1984-1985/2002
- work in Planet Detroit 1985
- St. Louis Blues & Other Poems (book) 1985
- work in Baltimore Sun Sunday magazine 1986
- work in Burnt Orphan 1986
- work in Bouillabaisse 1994
- work in Window Panes 1994
- work in Peshekee River Poetry 1999/2000
- The Word Is All There Is (book) 1999
- work in The Outlaw Bible of American Poetry anthology 1999
- work in Savoy 1999
- work in Red Rock Review anthology 2000
- work in Lost Highway anthology 2000
- work in Journal of Modern Writing 2001
- work in Butcher's Block 2000/2001
- featured poet Concrete Wolf 2001
- work in The-Hold 2000–2002
- Inside Jazz (book) 2003
- Smoke & Thunder 276-page collection 2003
- A Touch of Jazz (book) 2004
- Hillbilly Noir (fiction) 2004
- Parallel Blues (novel) 2006
- Death on a Dark Highway: The Murder of Dennis Brooks, Jr. (book) 2010
- Daddy's Fever and Other Stories (fiction) 2011
- Vampire Village Blues (novel) 2010
- The Fourth Night of Forever: Zombieland Blues (novel) 2014
- A Dunbrel of Quat (fnovel) 2016
- Broken Trail: A Western (novel) 2017
- A Fine Day to Travel: A Western (novel) 2017
- Bear Mountain (novel) 2017
