= St Dominic (disambiguation) =

Saint Dominic or Dominic de Guzmán was the Roman Catholic founder of the order of Dominicans.

St Dominic or Saint Dominic may also refer to:

== People ==
- Dominic de la Calzada (1019–1109), Spanish Saint
- Dominic of Silos (1000–1073), Spanish Benedictine Saint
- Dominic Savio (1842–1857), Italian Saint
- Saint Dominica (female saint) - Latin version of Saint Kyriaki

== Churches and monasteries ==
- St. Dominic's Church (Bronx, New York)
- St. Dominic's Church, Bahawalpur
- Basilica of St Dominic, Valletta
- St. Dominic Church in San Francisco
- St. Dominic Catholic Church (Washington, D.C.)

== Schools ==
=== Australia ===
- St Dominic's College, Penrith, New South Wales

=== Canada ===
- Saint Dominic Catholic Secondary School, Bracebridge, Ontario
- St. Dominic Elementary School, Montgomery Place, Saskatoon

=== India ===
- St Dominic's Convent English Medium School, Kerala

=== New Zealand ===
- St Dominic's College, Henderson, Auckland
- St Dominic's College, Whanganui, Gonville

=== Portugal ===
- St Dominic's International School, in Outeiro de Polima, near Lisbon, Portugal

=== United Kingdom ===
- St Dominic's Priory School (Stone), Stone, Staffordshire, England
- St Dominic's School, Hambledon, Surrey, England
- St Dominic's Grammar School for Girls, Belfast, Northern Ireland

=== United States ===
- St. Dominic Regional High School, Auburn, Maine
- Saint-Dominic Academy, a Catholic grammar school and high school in Lewiston and Auburn, Maine
- St Dominic High School (O'Fallon, Missouri)
- Mount Saint Dominic Academy, a Catholic high school for women in Caldwell, New Jersey
- St Dominic High School (Oyster Bay, New York)
- St Agnes Academy-St Dominic School, Memphis, Tennessee
- St Dominic Savio Catholic High School, North Austin, Texas

=== Zimbabwe ===
- St Dominic's Chishawasha, Chishawasha, Zimbabwe

== Other uses ==
- St Dominic, Cornwall, England
- Saint Dominic (Titian), an oil on canvas painting of Saint Dominic by Titian
- Saint Dominic (Tura), a painting in tempera and gold on panel of c. 1475 by Cosmè Tura

== See also ==
- Domenico
- San Domenico (disambiguation)
- Domingo (disambiguation)
- Santo Domingo, the capital city of the Dominican Republic, formerly the Spanish Captaincy General of Santo Domingo of Hispaniola
- Abbey of Santo Domingo de Silos, Santo Domingo de Silos, Burgos, Spain
- Santo Domingo Church, Quezon City, Philippines
- Domingue (disambiguation)
- Saint-Domingue, a former French colony of Hispaniola and the modern-day Republic of Haiti
- Dominic (disambiguation)
- Dominic
- Dominica or the Commonwealth of Dominica, an island country in the Lesser Antilles
- Santo Domingo (disambiguation)
- St. Dominic High School (disambiguation)
- Saint Dominic's Preview, an album by Van Morrison
- Domino (character)
