= David Lerner =

American poet

David Lerner

David Lerner (November 23, 1951 – July 1, 1997) was an American outlaw poet who helped lead the influential poetry group the Babarians at Cafe Babar in San Francisco.

== Life ==
Lerner was born in New York City and came from a family of Russian-Jewish renegades, growing up as a so-called "red-diaper baby". Lerner later moved to San Francisco and worked as a journalist, but left that career to live a bohemian life because journalism interfered with his poetry.

In the mid-Eighties he became involved with poetry readings at Cafe Babar in San Francisco's Mission District, with the group of poets there being called the Babarians. Described by Bruce Isaacson as a "poetry phenomenon" for his powerful performances, under Lerner's guidance Cafe Babar soon became known as the West Coast counterpart of the poetry slam movement that was also developing in New York and Chicago locations such as the Nuyorican Poets Café and Green Mill Cocktail Lounge. While the Babarians won poetry slams across the West Coast, they lacked the money to compete elsewhere in the country. However, their work was still called among the best in the United States and being representative of "the American avant-garde tradition."

In 1996, Lerner and other members of the Babarians did a series of readings in Germany. Lerner was also known for throwing peanuts at people during readings when their writing was bad.

Lerner and Bruce Isaacson co-founded Zeitgeist Press and have been referred to as "the Ezra Pound and T. S. Eliot of the underground." According to Julia Vinograd, the Cafe Babar readings died off in the mid-1990s when Isaacson moved to New York City to study with Allen Ginsberg. Lerner took Isaacson leaving as a personal desertion and stopped attending the readings.

Lerner's common-law wife Maura O'Connor also published poetry. Lerner was also associated in the early 1960s with cult leader Mel Lyman's Fort Hill Community.

Lerner died of a drug overdose in 1997.

== Poetry ==
Robinson Jeffers, Bob Dylan and Charles Bukowski have been cited as influences on Lerner's poetry, which Alan Kaufman described as a "tightly controlled eruption of paradoxes, visions, emotions and wit. His poetry has also been described as stripping the streets to nightmares, bringing "a visceral joy to readers," and being "powered by wild, associative leaps." The Red Rock Review said that Lerner's poetry showcases his "angst and alienation" and that he "clearly embraces the madness and despair of ... his own dark world" while The Singapore Review of Books called him an "eloquent screamer."

One of Lerner's most celebrated poems, "Mein Kampf," is considered a seminal statement of underground poetics in response to the weight of the mainstream. The poem's opening "all I want to do is make poetry famous" has also been quoted by other writers.

In the poem he says:

“all I want to do
is make poetry famous
all I want to do is
burn my initials into the sun
all I want to do is
read poetry from the middle of a
burning building...”

Lerner's work has not yet been fully collected in an available edition. A considerable amount of Lerner's work is still unpublished, including poems, prose, and a large volume of letters.

After Lerner died in 1997, Zeitgeist published his final collection The Last Five Miles to Grace posthumously. Bucky Sinister of the San Francisco Bay Guardian wrote: "Lerner was a broken-down saint if there ever was one. He was an eloquent screamer, a soft-spoken rageoholic, a madman with a great manuscript. His poetry will always be a reminder of a time when poetry in the Mission was spontaneous, magical, and more than a little bit dangerous."

Lerner's poetry has been read by people attempting to recover from addiction.

== Legacy ==
After his death, Lerner was named in Alan Kaufman's poem "The Last Emphysema Gasp of the Marlboro Man" while Julia Vinograd wrote the poem "For David Lerner: Death of a Poet" in his honor. Richard Cohn also wrote a poem in his honor.

In 2006 Trafford Publishing released the anthology New American Underground Poetry, Vol 1: The Babarians of San Francisco, edited by Lerner, Vinograd and Alan Allen. The anthology includes a selection of his poetry including "Mein Kampf." His poetry has also been reprinted in The Outlaw Bible of American Poetry.

== Bibliography ==
=== Poetry Collections ===
- I Want a New Gun (1988)
- Why Rimbaud Went to Africa (1989)
- The American Book of the Dead (1991)
- Pray Like the Hunted (1992)
- The Last Five Miles to Grace (2005, new and selected poems)
- Pirate Lerner (2006, CD, also on iTunes)
- A Bouquet of Nails: The Uncollected Poems of David Lerner (2022)

=== Anthologies ===
- New American Underground Poetry, Vol 1: The Babarians of San Francisco edited by David Lerner, Julia Vinograd and Alan Allen (2006)
