= Minimum wage (disambiguation) =

A minimum wage is the lowest remuneration that employers can legally pay their employees.

Minimum wage may also refer to:

- Minimum Wage (song), a 2021 song by Blake Shelton
- Minimum Wage (comics), a comic book series by Bob Fingerman
- Minimum Wage (TV series), a 2026 American TV series
