= Firecracker Award =

Literary awards

- Awarded for: Literary excellence
- Sponsored by: Community of Literary Magazines and Presses
- Date: June
- Reward: $1,000–$2,000
- First award: Original version: 1996–2002; new version: 2015 (2014 publications)
- Final award: Active
- Website: www.clmp.org/programs-opportunities/firecracker/

The Firecracker Awards are a set of annual U.S. literary awards focusing on small-press publishing. Previously known as the Firecracker Alternative Book Awards (FABs), in the current form they are known as the CLMP Firecracker Awards for Independently Published Literature, and are administered by the Community of Literary Magazines and Presses (CLMP).

The Firecracker Alternative Book Awards were established in 1996 and were presented through 2002. The Firecracker Awards returned in 2015, "to celebrate books and magazines that make a significant contribution to our literary culture and the publishers that strive to introduce important voices to readers far and wide."

Neither version of the Firecracker books awards are related to an identically named award given to "women photographers born or working in Europe."

== Process ==
CLMP Firecracker Awards are given to one winner annually in each of five categories: Fiction, Creative Nonfiction, Poetry, Best Debut in Magazine, and General Excellence in Magazine. A shortlist of nominees in each category is announced beforehand. (There have previously been other categories but they have been retired or subsumed in the existing five.)

According to a 2014 Publishers Weekly article, the awards are "judged by a panel of writers, editors, booksellers, and agents. Members of the Firecracker Committee include representatives from, in addition to CLMP and the ABA, Tin House, Workman Publishing, Random House, Byliner, Greenlight Books, and a host of literary agents...."

In the book categories, winning presses receive $1,000-2,000, and authors or translators receive $1,000. Magazine winners receive $1,000 each. The winning titles are also showcased in CLMP's national publicity campaigns.

Generally, the Firecrackers are announced each June. Each ceremony includes the naming of that year's recipient of the Lord Nose Award, "given in recognition of a lifetime of superlative work in literary publishing."

== History ==
The Firecracker Alternative Book Awards were established in 1996 by John Davis of Koen Book Distribution, with support from Publishers Group West, Publishers Weekly, and Tower Books & Records. The FABs were designed to bring attention to "the best in alternative printing" by honoring books on the "'unmapped edges of contemporary culture' that 'sharpen the cutting edge.'" Categories included Fiction, Nonfiction, Poetry, Politics, Sex, Music, Graphic Novel, Zine, Kids, Art/Photo, Drugs, and Special Recognition/Wildcard. Winners "were selected via an online voting system."

The FABs were administered by volunteers rather than an official organization, and after 2002 the task became "unsustainable." CLMP was approached at that time about continuing the awards, but the organization passed on the opportunity for a couple of reasons, one being that the voting system "bore a lack of transparency that raised concerns," and the other being that CLMP felt it needed to gain more solid financial footing before it took on administering a set of literary awards.

The revitalized CLMP Firecracker Awards returned in 2015, "broadening the focus from strictly unorthodox works."

== Winners ==
=== FABs (1996–2002) ===
Firecracker Alternative Book Award winners
Year	Category	Author/Recipient	Title
1996	Fiction	Georges Perec	A Void
1996	Nonfiction	Carl Jensen and Project Censored	Censored: The News that Didn't Make the News — and Why
1996	Poetry	S. E. Anderson and Tony Medina	In Defense of Mumia
1996	Politics	Leonard Weinglass	Race for Justice: Mumia Abu-Jamal's Fight Against the Death Penalty
1996	Graphic Novel	Art Spiegelman & Robert Sikoryak, eds.	The Narrative Corpse
1996	Music	Henry Rollins	Get in the Van: On the Road with Black Flag
1996	Drugs	Dale Pendell	Pharmako/Poeia: Plant Powers, Poisons, and Herbcraft
1996	Sex	Kitty Tsui	Breathless: Erotica
1996	Special Recognition/Wildcard	David Robinson	Saving Graces
1996	Special Recognition/Wildcard	Peter Lamborn Wilson	Pirate Utopias
1997	Fiction	Rob Hardin	Distorture
1997	Nonfiction	Leslie Feinberg	Transgender Warriors
1997	Poetry	Linda Smukler	Home in Three Days. Don't Wash.
1997	Politics	Peter Phillips	Censored 1997: The News That Didn't Make the News: The Year's Top 25 Censored News Stories
1997	Graphic Novel	Ted Rall	Real Americans Admit: "The Worst Thing I've Ever Done"
1997	Art/Photo	Susie Bright & Jill Posener, eds.	Nothing but the Girl: the Blatant Lesbian Image: A Portfolio and Exploration of Lesbian Erotic Photography
1997	Sex	Paul Joannides with Dærick Gröss Sr. (illus.)	The Guide to Getting it On
1997	Drugs	Everything I Know I Learned on Acid	Coco Pekelis (editor)
1997	Music	Iggy Pop	I Need More
1997	'Zine	Celina Hex and Betty Boob, editors/publishers	Bust
1997	Kids	Davida Adedjouma, editor	The Palm of My Heart: Poetry by African American Children
1997	Outstanding Independent Press of the Year	AK Press	
1997	Outstanding Independent Press of the Year	Cleis Press	
1997	Outstanding Independent Press of the Year	Incommunicado	
1997	Special Recognition/Wildcard: This Ain't Yer Family's Photo Album	Katherine Dunn and Sean Tejaratchi	Death Scenes
1997	Special Recognition/Wildcard: Don't Cook With Your Mouth Full	Martha Hopkins and Randall Lockridge	InterCourses: An Aphrodisiac Cookbook
1997	Recall Hoekstra Award for Special Merit in Literary Publishing	FC2/Black Ice Books	
1998	Fiction	Scott Heim	In Awe
1998	Nonfiction	Carolyn Lei-Lanilau	Ono Ono Girl's Hula
1998	Poetry	Gerry Gomez Pearlberg	Queer Dog: Homo/Pup/Poetry
1998	Politics	Howard Zinn	The Zinn Reader: Writings on Disobedience and Democracy
1998	Graphic Novel	Bob Fingerman	Minimum Wage Book 2: Tales of Hoffman
1998	Kids	Javaka Steptoe	In Daddy's Arms I Am Tall: African Americans Celebrating Fathers
1998	Music	Laurent de Wilde	Monk
1998	Drugs	Bobcat Press	The Joint Rolling Handbook
1998	Sex	Tristan Taormino	The Ultimate Guide to Anal Sex for Women
1998	Special Recognition/Wildcard	Max Cannon	Red Meat: A Collection of Red Meat Cartoons From the Secret Files of Max Cannon
1998	Special Recognition/Wildcard	Jim Jarmusch, contributor	Original Sin: The Visionary Art of Joe Coleman
1998	Special Recognition/Wildcard	Constance Penley	NASA/Trek: Popular Science and Sex in America
1999	Fiction	Carol Queen	The Leather Daddy and the Femme
1999	Nonfiction	Inga Muscio	Cunt: A Declaration of Independence
1999	Poetry	Michael Madsen	Burning In Paradise
1999	Politics	Gary Webb	Dark Alliance: The CIA, the Contras, and the Cocaine Explosion
1999	Graphic Novel	Eric Drooker	Street Posters and Ballads: A Selection of Songs, Poems, and Graphics
1999	Music	Michael J. Moynihan and Didrik Søderlind	Lords of Chaos: The Bloody Rise of the Satanic Metal Underground
1999	Sex	Maurice Vellekoop	Maurice Vellekoop's ABC Book: A Homoerotic Primer
1999	Drugs	Steven Cerio	Steven Cerio's ABC Book: A Drug Primer
1999	Art/Photo	Steve Diet Goedde	The Beauty of Fetish
1999	Zine	Teresa Cooper and Lisa Zale, publishers	The Fish Tank
1999	Kids	Charles Burns (cartoonist) and Gary Panter	Facetasm: A Creepy Mix & Match Book of Gross Face Mutations
1999	Outstanding Independent Press of the Year	Cleis Press	
1999	Self Improvement	Kate Bornstein with Diane DiMassa, illustrator	My Gender Workbook: How to Become a Real Man, a Real Woman, the Real You, or Something Else Entirely
1999	Special Recognition/Wildcard: Maybe Mr. Falwell Was Right	Andrew Davenport, editor	Teletubbies: Dancing with the Skirt
1999	Special Recognition/Wildcard: Maybe the NEA Was Wrong	Subcomandante Marcos, Anne Bar Din (translator), Domitilia Dominguez (illustrator)	The Story of Colors/La Historia de los Colores: A Bilingual Folktale from the Jungles of Chiapas
2000	Fiction	Marci Blackman	Po Man's Child
2000	Nonfiction	Howard Zinn and David Barsamian, interviewer	The Future of History
2000	Poetry	Alan Kaufman (writer) and S.A. Griffin, eds.	The Outlaw Bible of American Poetry
2000	Politics	William Upski Wimsatt	No More Prisons
2000	Graphic Novel	Julie Doucet	My New York Diary
2000	Kids	Subcomandante Marcos and Anne Bar Din, translator	The Story of Colors/La Historia de los Colores: A Bilingual Folktale from the Jungles of Chiapas
2000	Sex	Shawna Kenney	I Was a Teenage Dominatrix
2000	Drugs	Paul Krassner, compiler	High Times Presents Paul Krassner's Pot Stories for the Soul
2000	Music	Bryan Ray Turcotte and Christopher T. Miller, eds.	Fucked Up + Photocopied: Instant Art of the Punk Rock Movement
2000	Art/Photo	Trina Robbins	From Girls to Grrrlz: A History of Women's Comics from Teens to Zines
2000	Special Recognition/Wildcard: Books about Gap-Toothed Deceased Female Cartoonists with Smelly Dogs	Dori Seda	Dori Stories
2000	Special Recognition/Wildcard: Best Propaganda Video Guide	Ken Smith (writer)	Mental Hygiene: Classroom Films 1945-1970
2001	Fiction	Neal Pollack	The Neal Pollack Anthology of American Literature
2001	Nonfiction	Alexander Theroux	The Strange Case of Edward Gorey
2001	Poetry	Shappy & Sam Henderson	Little Book of Ass
2001	Politics	Ralph Nader	The Ralph Nader Reader
2001	Graphic Novel	Chris Ware	Jimmy Corrigan, the Smartest Kid on Earth
2001	Sex	Katharine Gates	Deviant Desires
2001	Drugs	Mary Jane	Aunt Mary Jane's Baking With Pot
2001	Music	David Margolick	Strange Fruit
2001	Art/Photo	Gina Garan	This Is Blythe
2001	Kids	Mindy Morgenstern	The Real Rules for Girls
2001	Special Recognition — Spoken Word	Daphne Gottlieb	Why Things Burn
2002	Fiction	Beth Lisick	This Too Can Be Yours
2002	Nonfiction	Eric Schlosser	Fast Food Nation: The Dark Side of the All-American Meal
2002	Poetry	Dodie Bellamy	Cunt-Ups
2002	Politics	Noam Chomsky	9-11
2002	Graphic Novel	Joe Sacco	Palestine
2002	Art/Photo	Chris Cooper	Devil's Advocate: The Art of Coop
2002	Kids	Art Spiegelman & Françoise Mouly, eds.	Little Lit: Strange Stories for Strange Kids
2002	Music	Daniel Sinker	We Owe You Nothing
2002	Drugs	Phil Shoenfelt	Junkie Love
2002	Sex	Annie Sprinkle with Gabrielle H. Cody	Hardcore from the Heart: The Pleasures, Profits and Politics of Sex in Performance

=== CLMP Firecrackers Awards (2015–present) ===
CLMP Firecracker Award winners
Year	Category	Author	Title
2015	Fiction	Jeffery Renard Allen	Song of the Shank
2015	Creative Nonfiction	Marie NDiaye	Self-Portrait in Green
2015	Poetry	Bernadette Mayer	Sonnets: Expanded 25th Anniversary Edition
2015	Graphic Novel	Hubert Boulard and Kerascoët	Beauty (Beauté)
2015	Young Adult	Patty Blount	Some Boys
2015	Magazines/For Poetry		Poetry
2015	Magazines/Best Debut		Story
2015	Magazines/General Excellence		Tin House
2016	Fiction	Andrés Neuman	The Things We Don't Do
2016	Creative Nonfiction	Joni Tevis	The World is On Fire: Scrap, Treasure, and Songs of Apocalypse
2016	Poetry	Anne Boyer	Garments Against Women
2016	Literary Magazine		A Public Space
2017	Fiction	Ananda Devi with Jeffrey Zuckerman (trans.)	Eve Out of Her Ruins
2017	Creative Nonfiction	Renee Gladman	Calamities
2017	Poetry	Douglas Kearney	Buck Studies
2017	Magazines: Best Debut		Bennington Review
2017	Magazine: General Excellence		Prairie Schooner
2018	Fiction	Rivers Solomon	An Unkindness of Ghosts
2018	Creative Nonfiction	Aisha Sabatini Sloan	Dreaming of Ramadi in Detroit
2018	Poetry	Javier Zamora	Unaccompanied
2018	Magazines: Best Debut		Flock Literary Journal
2018	Magazines: General Excellence:		One Story
2019	Fiction	Casey Plett	Little Fish
2019	Creative Nonfiction	Shaelyn Smith	The Leftovers
2019	Poetry	Sesshu Foster	City of the Future
2019	Magazines: Best Debut		Aster(ix)
2019	Magazines: General Excellence		ZYZZYVA
2020	Fiction	Johannes Anyuru with Saskia Vogel (trans.)	They Will Drown in their Mothers' Tears
2020	Creative Nonfiction	Jehanne Dubrow	throughsmoke
2020	Poetry	Jena Osman	Motion Studies
2020	Poetry	Laura Moriarty	Personal Volcano
2020	Magazines/Best Debut		Porter House Review
2020	Magazines/General Excellence		Two Lines Journal
2021	Fiction	Aoko Matsuda with Polly Barton (trans.)	Where the Wild Ladies Are
2021	Creative Nonfiction	Melissa Valentine	The Names of All the Flowers
2021	Poetry	Justin Phillip Reed	The Malevolent Volume
2021	Magazines/Best Debut		Lucky Jefferson
2021	Magazines/General Excellence		Mizna
2022	Fiction	Celeste Mohammed	Pleasantview
2022	Creative Nonfiction	Allison Cobb	Plastic: An Autobiography
2022	Poetry	Truong Tran	book of the other: small in comparison
2022	Magazines/Best Debut		Sistories
2022	Magazines/General Excellence		Obsidian: Literature & Arts in the African Diaspora
2023	Fiction	Zain Khalid	Brother Alive
2023	Creative Nonfiction	Douglas Kearney	Optic Subwoof
2023	Poetry	Solmaz Sharif	Customs
2023	Magazines/Best Debut		128 Lit
2023	Magazines/General Excellence		Ecotone
