= Patrick Dempsey =

American actor and racecar driver (born 1966)

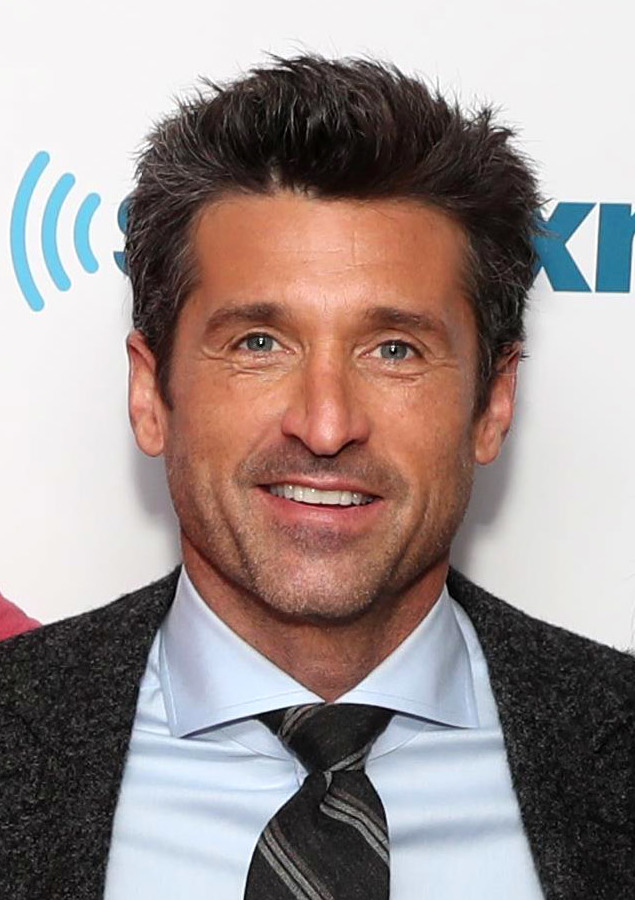
- Dempsey in 2016
- Born: Patrick Galen Dempsey; January 13, 1966 (age 60); Lewiston, Maine, U.S.
- Occupations: Actor; racecar driver
- Years active: 1983–present
- Spouse(s): Rocky Parker (m. 1987; div. 1994) Jillian Fink (m. 1999)
- Children: 3

FIA World Endurance Championship career
- Debut season: 2015
- Current team: Dempsey Racing-Proton
- Categorisation: FIA Bronze
- Car number: 77
- Starts: 7
- Wins: 1
- Podiums: 2
- Poles: 0
- Fastest laps: 0
- Best finish: 6th in 2015

Previous series
- 2014; 2007–2013; 2012–2013; 2010–2012: United SportsCar Championship; Rolex Sports Car Series; American Le Mans Series; Continental Tire Sports Car Challenge

24 Hours of Le Mans career
- Years: 2009; 2013–2015
- Teams: Advanced Engineering; Team Seattle; Dempsey-Proton
- Best finish: 22nd (2015)

Patrick Galen Dempsey (born January 13, 1966) is an American actor, racecar driver and philanthropist who is best known for playing neurosurgeon Dr. Derek Shepherd in Grey's Anatomy (2005–2015; 2020–2021). He is also known for his leading man romantic film roles, such as Enchanted (2007). Dempsey has received nominations for a Primetime Emmy Award and two Golden Globe Awards, and was named as People's Sexiest Man Alive in 2023.

Dempsey started his career acting in films such as Can't Buy Me Love (1987) and Loverboy (1989). He has since starred in several romantic comedy films such as Sweet Home Alabama (2002), Made of Honor (2008), Valentine's Day (2010), and Bridget Jones's Baby (2016). Dempsey has also taken dramatic roles in Outbreak (1995), Scream 3 (2000), Freedom Writers (2007), Transformers: Dark of the Moon (2011), Thanksgiving (2023), and Ferrari (2023). He starred in and produced Flypaper (2011), and The Art of Racing in the Rain (2019). In 2026, he began playing the main role of Angelo Doyle in the Fox crime drama Memory of a Killer.

Dempsey, who maintains a sports car and vintage car collection, enjoys auto racing in his spare time. He has competed in events such as the 24 Hours of Le Mans and Daytona events in sports car racing, and the Baja 1000 in desert racing. Prior to the 2013 24 Hours of Le Mans, Dempsey declared that he would "walk away" from acting if he could and dedicate himself full-time to motorsports.

== Early life ==
Patrick Galen Dempsey was born on January 13, 1966, in Lewiston, Maine, and grew up in the nearby towns of Turner and Buckfield. He has two older sisters. His mother, Amanda (née Casson), was a school secretary, and his father, William, was an insurance salesman.

He attended Leavitt Area High School, Buckfield High School and St. Dominic Regional High School. After becoming an actor, he dropped out his senior year and earned a GED.

In his youth, Dempsey participated in juggling competitions. In 1981, he achieved second place at the International Jugglers' Association Championship in the Juniors category, just behind Anthony Gatto, who is considered to be the best technical juggler of all time.

Dempsey was diagnosed with dyslexia at age 12. He told Barbara Walters on her 2008 Oscar special that he thinks dyslexia made him what he is today. "It's given me a perspective of — you have to keep working," Dempsey told Walters. "I have never given up."

== Acting career ==
=== 1983–1989: Early roles and breakthrough ===
At 17, Dempsey got an audition for a role in the stage production of Torch Song Trilogy, which led to his discovery as an actor in 1983. His audition was successful and he spent the following four months touring with the company in Philadelphia. He followed this with another tour, Brighton Beach Memoirs, in the lead role, which was directed by Gene Saks. Dempsey has also made notable appearances in the stage productions of On Golden Pond, with the Maine Acting Company, and as Timmy (the Martin Sheen role) in a 1990 off-Broadway revival of The Subject Was Roses co-starring with John Mahoney and Dana Ivey at the Roundabout Theatre in New York.

Dempsey's first major feature film role was at age 21 with Beverly D'Angelo in the film In the Mood, the actual World War II story about Ellsworth Wisecarver whose relationships with older married women created a national uproar. He then co-starred in the third installment of the comedy classic Meatballs III: Summer Job, alongside Sally Kellerman in 1987. This was followed by the teen comedy Can't Buy Me Love in 1987 with actress Amanda Peterson and Some Girls with Jennifer Connelly in 1988. In 1989, Dempsey had the lead role in the films Loverboy with actress Kirstie Alley and Happy Together with actress Helen Slater.

=== 1990–2004: Established actor ===
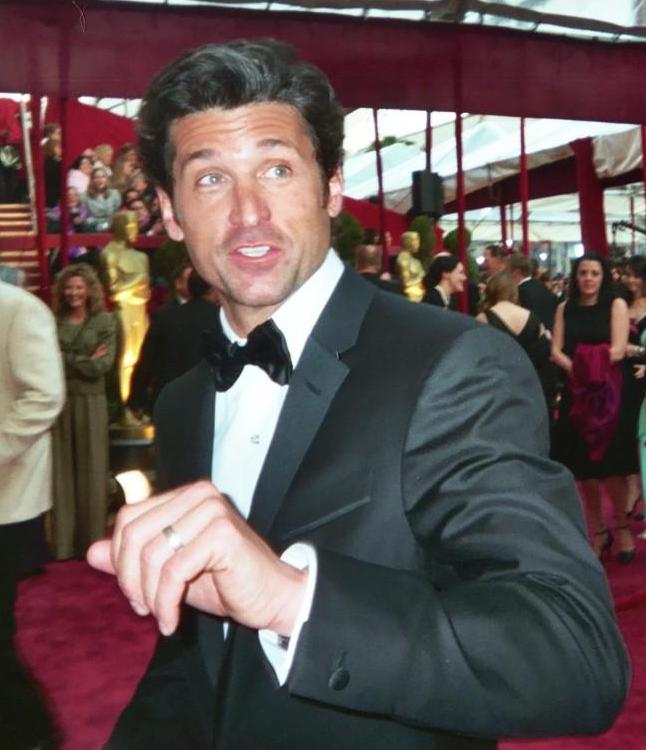
Dempsey at the 80th Academy Awards

Dempsey made several featured appearances in television in the 1990s; he was cast several times in pilots that were not picked up for a full season, including lead roles in the TV versions of the films The Player and About A Boy. He received positive reviews, however, as he portrayed real-life mob boss, Meyer Lansky in 1991 when Mobsters was put on the screen. His first major television role was a three-episode stint as Will Truman's closeted sportscaster boyfriend on Will & Grace. He appeared in four episodes of Once & Again as Aaron Brooks, the schizophrenic brother of Lily (Sela Ward). Dempsey received an Emmy nomination in 2001 as Outstanding Guest Actor in a Drama Series for the role of Aaron. In 1993, he played a young John F. Kennedy in the two-part TV mini-series JFK: Reckless Youth. In 2000, he played Detective Kincaid in Scream 3.

Dempsey had a high-profile role as the fiancé of Reese Witherspoon's character in Sweet Home Alabama (2002). In 2004, he co-starred in the highly acclaimed HBO production Iron Jawed Angels, opposite Hilary Swank and Anjelica Huston. He also appeared as special guest star in The Practice for its three-episode finale season (8x13-8x15).

=== 2005–2015: Stardom and Grey's Anatomy ===
Dempsey has received significant public attention for his role as Dr. Derek "McDreamy" Shepherd in the medical drama Grey's Anatomy opposite Ellen Pompeo. Before landing the role, Dempsey auditioned for the role of Dr. Chase on another medical show, House. He also appeared in two episodes of the later Grey's spinoff Private Practice, playing the same character of Dr. Shepherd. The relationship his character had with Meredith Grey (Ellen Pompeo) on screen has received a lot of praise and positive reactions.

In 2007, Dempsey starred in the Disney film Enchanted, and the Paramount Pictures film Freedom Writers, where he reunited with his Iron Jawed Angels co-star Hilary Swank. He also voiced the character Kenai in Brother Bear sequel Brother Bear 2, replacing Joaquin Phoenix. Other roles Dempsey appeared in during this time include the 2008 film Made of Honor as Tom, and the 2010 romantic comedy Valentine's Day; the latter film follows five interconnecting stories about Los Angelinos anticipating (or in some cases dreading) the holiday of love. Universal Pictures acquired the rights to the prize-winning novel The Art of Racing in the Rain in July 2009, for Dempsey to star in. The film instead starred Milo Ventimiglia. He starred as Dylan Gould in Transformers: Dark of the Moon (2011).

In January 2014, he signed a two-year contract to remain on Grey's Anatomy, then in its tenth season, that would ensure his participation for potential 11th and 12th seasons. Dempsey was nominated for Best Actor – Television Series Drama at the 2006 Golden Globe Awards for the role. His success on the show has led to his becoming a spokesman for Mazda and State Farm Insurance. BuddyTV ranked him #1 on its list of "TV's Sexiest Men of 2011". In November 2020, Dempsey appeared as Derek Shepherd at the start of the series' 17th season for the first time since the character had died in April 2015.

=== 2016–present ===
Following his departure from Grey's Anatomy, Dempsey was working on two small-screen projects: a drama The Limit for SundanceTV and a travelogue spy thriller called Fodors. He said:

I would love to do something else. I'm going to take the rest of the year off to develop. I would like to be a producer. I would commit to a show that is 10 to 12 episodes. But 24 again, I don't know if I would do that. It's a very hard life. It's financially rewarding but there comes a point where how much is enough, really? I'm focusing now on developing and racing and being a father to my children.

In 2016, Dempsey starred in the Universal Pictures film Bridget Jones's Baby with Renée Zellweger and Colin Firth, and in 2018 he appeared on Epix television miniseries The Truth About the Harry Quebert Affair. In 2017 he participated in the short film Red Nose Day Actually, a sequel to the 2003 romantic comedy Love Actually. Dempsey played the role of the husband of Laura Linney's character Sarah. Starting from 2020 he has portrayed Dominic Morgan in the Sky Atlantic financial thriller series Devils. On February 4, 2020, Dempsey signed on to star as the lead of a CBS political drama pilot Ways & Means, where he would portray a Congressional leader. Initially planned to be considered for the 2020–21 televisions season, the pilot was rolled into consideration for the following season due to the COVID-19 pandemic. CBS ultimately passed on the finished pilot in May 2021. In January 2021, it was announced that Dempsey would reprise his role in the Enchanted sequel, Disenchanted, which began production in spring of that year. The film was released on Disney+ in late 2022. In 2023, he portrayed Sheriff Eric Newlon in the slasher film Thanksgiving and Piero Taruffi in the biographical sports drama Ferrari directed by Michael Mann. In 2024, Dempsey portrayed police captain Aaron Spencer in the prequel series Dexter: Original Sin. He currently stars as Angelo in the Fox series Memory of a Killer

== Auto racing ==
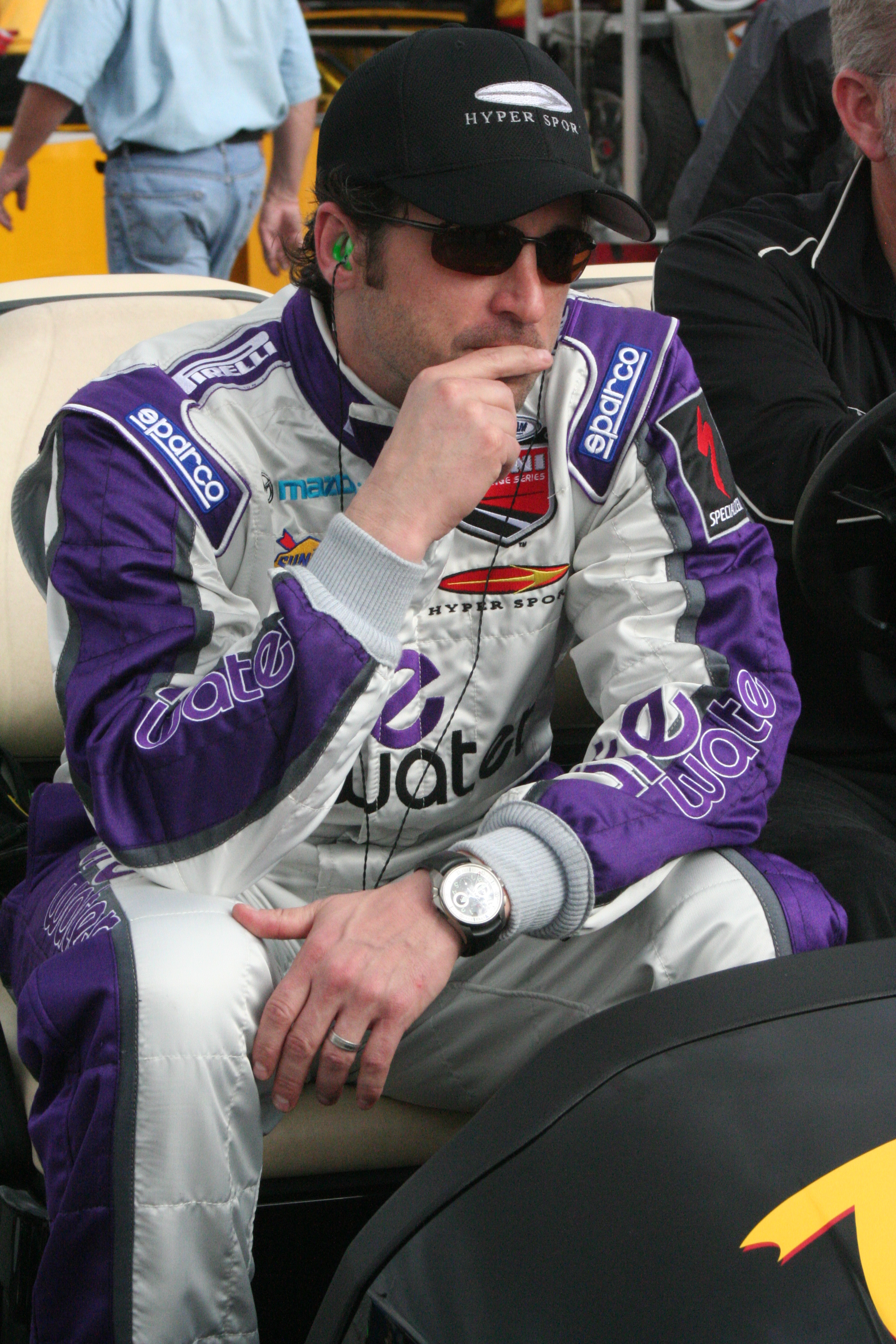
Dempsey at the 2008 Rolex 24 Hours of Daytona

In 2014, Dempsey told Reuters in the Hockenheimring support paddock at the German Grand Prix that motor racing was not just a hobby, and had become as much a part of who he is as acting. He said, "It's all-consuming in many ways. I couldn't imagine not racing right now. It really keeps me motivated. It's all I think about on a daily basis."

Dempsey, who maintains an extensive sports and vintage car collection, has enjoyed auto racing in his spare time for several years. Before the 24 Hours of Le Mans in 2013, he said that he would like to compete full-time, telling Eurosport:

I would like to make that [motorsports] a complete priority and just focus on this full-time. If I could just walk away from acting, I think I could do that very easily, and just focus on the driving, I would love that more than anything else.

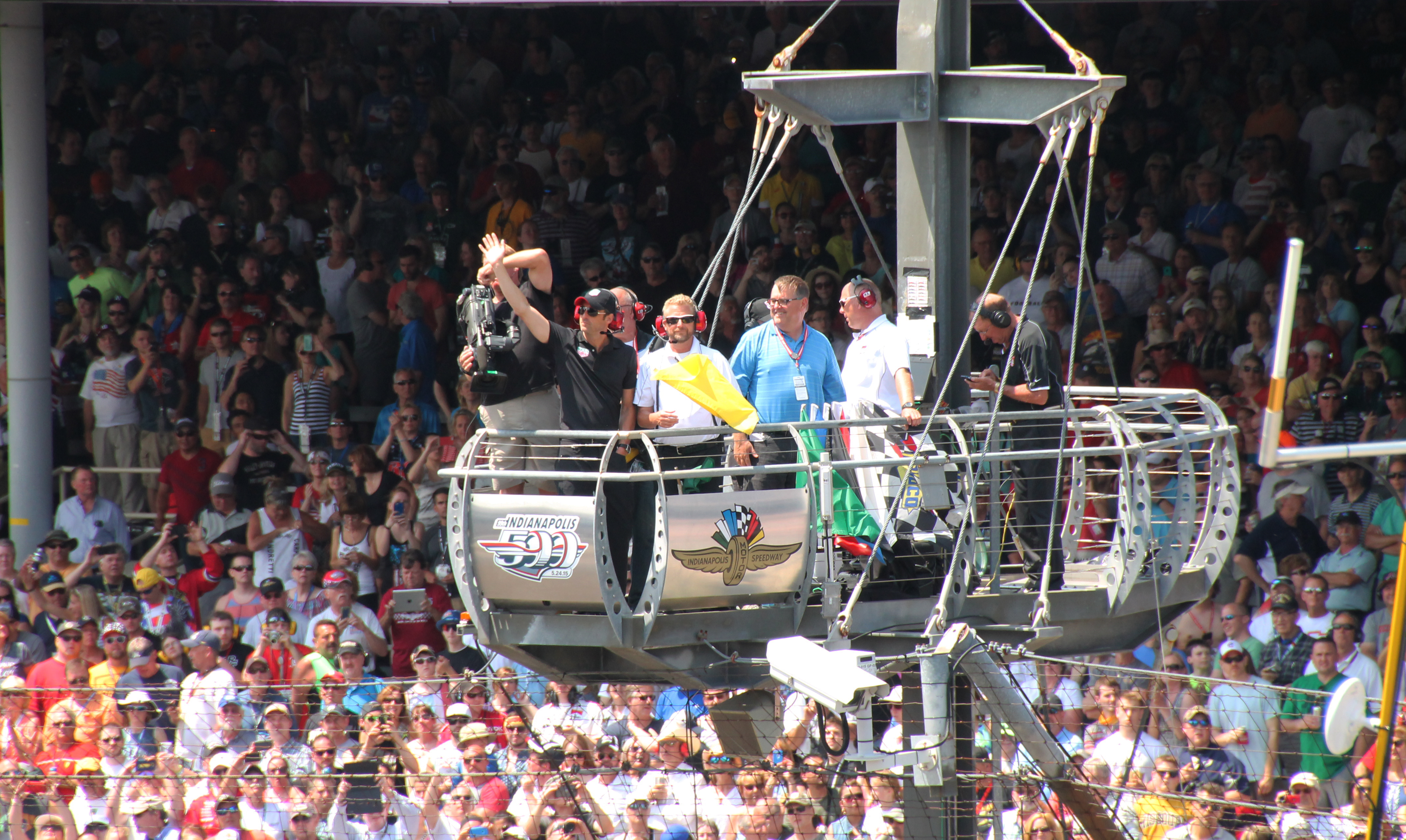
Dempsey waves to the crowd at the 2015 Indianapolis 500, where he served as the Honorary Starter.

Dempsey has competed in prestigious events such as the 24 Hours of Le Mans and Rolex 24 at Daytona sports car races, and the Tecate SCORE Baja 1000 off-road race. He was a co-owner of the Vision Racing IndyCar Series team and current owner of Dempsey Racing, which is presently racing two Porsche 911 GT America's in the Tudor United Sports Car Series. He participated in this series as often as his schedule allowed, although insurance restrictions kept him from driving competitively while also filming a motion picture. In 2009, he raced a Team Seattle Advanced Engineering Ferrari F430 GT in the 2009 24 Hours of Le Mans's GT2 class and finished ninth in class.

Dempsey announced he would race the 2011 Rolex 24 at Daytona along with other races throughout the season in a Mazda RX-8. Dempsey finished in third place in the GT Class of the Rolex 24 at Daytona. In 2012, Dempsey competed in the Grand-Am Continental Tire Sports Car Challenge behind the wheel of an Aston Martin Racing-Multimatic Motorsports Aston Martin Vantage GT4, which, after five successful racing seasons in Europe, was to make its debut on American tracks. He formed the Dempsey Racing team to compete in the American Le Mans Series. The team fielded a full-time Oreca FLM09 in the Prototype Challenge class as well as a Lola B12/80 coupe in the Prototype 2 class from Laguna Seca onward.

After debuting at the 2009 24 Hours of Le Mans, Dempsey returned to France four years later and competed in a Porsche 997 GT3 RSR at the 2013 24 Hours of Le Mans endurance race. Dempsey and his co-drivers finished 29th overall and fourth in-class. In 2015, Dempsey focused on participating in the FIA World Endurance Championship with his own Dempsey Racing-Proton team in the GTE-Am class in a Porsche 997 GT3 RSR, teamed with Patrick Long and Marco Seefried. He told Porsche Newsroom: "Not much changes in my TV work, but everything changes constantly in motor racing – every lap, every bend and every moment."

== Racing record ==
=== Career summary ===
Season	Series	Team	Races	Wins	Poles	F/Laps	Podiums	Points	Position
2004	Panoz Racing Series (GT class)	TBA	2	0	0	0	0	9	9th
2006	Toyota Pro/Celebrity Race (Pro class)	TBA	1	0	TBA	TBA	1	N/A	2nd
2007	Rolex Sports Car Series (GT class)	Hyper Sport	1	0	0	0	0	21	82nd
2008	Rolex Sports Car Series (GT class)	Hyper Sport	9	0	0	0	0	143	30th
2009	Rolex Sports Car Series (GT class)	Dempsey Racing	7	0	0	0	0	143	20th
2009	24 Hours of Le Mans (GT2 class)	Advanced Engineering; Team Seattle	1	0	0	0	0	N/A	9th
2010	Rolex Sports Car Series (GT class)	Dempsey Racing	4	0	0	0	0	89	29th
2010	Continental Tire Sports Car Challenge (ST class)	Freedom Autosport	1	0	0	0	0	9	90th
2011	Rolex Sports Car Series (GT class)	Dempsey Racing	11	0	0	0	1	226	11th
2012	Continental Tire Sports Car Challenge (GS class)	Multimatic Motorsports	2	0	0	0	0	0	NC
2012	Rolex Sports Car Series (GT class)	Dempsey Racing	9	0	0	0	0	138	24th
2012	American Le Mans Series (LMP2 class)	Dempsey Racing	5	0	0	0	2	53	3rd
2012	Maserati Trofeo World Series	TBA	2	0	0	0	0	0	NC
2013	American Le Mans Series (GTC class)	Dempsey Racing/Del Piero	10	0	0	0	3	87	7th
2013	24 Hours of Le Mans (GTE Am class)	Dempsey Del Piero-Proton	1	0	0	0	0	N/A	4th
2014	United SportsCar Championship (GTD class)	Dempsey Racing	8	0	0	0	1	134	18th
2014	24 Hours of Le Mans (GTE Am class)	Dempsey Racing-Proton	1	0	0	0	0	N/A	5th
2014	Porsche Supercup	Porsche AG	1	0	0	0	0	0‡	NC‡
2015	FIA World Endurance Championship (GTE Am class)	Dempsey Racing-Proton	7	1	1	0	2	116	6th
2015	24 Hours of Le Mans (GTE Am class)	Dempsey Racing-Proton	1	0	0	0	1	N/A	2nd
2015	Porsche Supercup	Porsche AG	1	0	0	0	0	0‡	NC‡
2015	United SportsCar Championship (GTD class)	Wright Motorsports	1	0	0	0	1	31	33rd

^{‡} Not eligible for points.

=== 24 Hours of Le Mans results ===
Year	Team	Co-Drivers	Car	Class	Laps	Pos.	Class Pos.
2009	(Italy) Advanced Engineering (United States) Team Seattle	(United States) Don Kitch Jr. (United States) Joe Foster	Ferrari F430 GT2	GT2	301	30th	9th
2013	(United States) Dempsey Del Piero-Proton	(United States) Joe Foster (United States) Patrick Long	Porsche 997 GT3-RSR	GTE; Am	305	28th	4th
2014	(United States) Dempsey Racing-Proton	(United States) Joe Foster (United States) Patrick Long	Porsche 911 RSR	GTE; Am	329	24th	5th
2015	(Germany) Dempsey-Proton Racing	(United States) Patrick Long (Germany) Marco Seefried	Porsche 911 RSR	GTE; Am	330	22nd	2nd

=== Complete Rolex Sports Car Series results ===
(key) (Results are overall/class)

Year	Entrant	Class	Chassis	Engine	1	2	3	4	5	6	7	8	9	10	11	12	13	Rank	Points	Ref
2007	Hyper Sport	GT	Mazda RX-8 GT	Mazda 2.0L 3-Rotor	DAY	MEX	HOM	VIR	LGA	LIM	WGL	MOH	DAY	IOW	BAR	MON	MIL; 27/10	82nd	21	
2008	Hyper Sport	GT	Mazda RX-8 GT	Mazda 2.0L 3-Rotor	DAY; 39/24	HOM; 27/14	MEX	VIR	LGA	LIM	WGL; 36/19	MOH; 24/12	DAY; 25/11	BAR; 28/14	MON; 26/9	NJ; 33/19	MIL; 26/14	30th	143	
2009	Dempsey Racing	GT	Mazda RX-8 GT	Mazda 2.0L 3-Rotor	DAY; 35/22	VIR	NJ; 15/7	LGA; 22/10	WGL; 21/7	MOH; 18/6	DAY; 26/11	BAR	WGL	MON	MIL	HOM; 28/11		20th	143	
2010	Dempsey Racing	GT	Mazda RX-8 GT	Mazda 2.0L 3-Rotor	DAY; 13/6	HOM; 21/7	BAR; 21/10	VIR; 23/12	LIM	WGL	MOH	DAY	NJ	WGL	MON	MIL		29th	89	
2011	Dempsey Racing	GT	Mazda RX-8 GT	Mazda 2.0L 3-Rotor	DAY; 14/3	HOM; 31/18†	BAR; 18/8	VIR; 21/13	LIM; 20/11	WGL; 15/9	ELK	LGA; 23/13	NJ; 16/9	WGL; 22/11	MON; 21/11	MOH; 21/11		11th	226	
2012	Dempsey Racing	GT	Mazda RX-8 GT	Mazda 2.0L 3-Rotor	DAY; 21/10	BAR; 21/13	HOM; 21/14†	NJ	BEL; 25/16	MOH; 18/10	ELK; 17/11	WGL; 26/16	IMS; 31/21	WGL	MON	LGA; 23/13	LIM	24th	138	

^{†} Did not complete sufficient laps in order to score points.

=== Complete Continental Tire Sports Car Challenge results ===
(key) (Results are overall/class)

Year	Entrant	Class	Chassis	Tyres	1	2	3	4	5	6	7	8	9	10	Rank	Points	Ref
2010	Freedom Autosport	ST	Mazdaspeed3	C	DAY; 47/22	HOM	BAR	VIR	LIM	WGL	MOH	NJ	TRO	MIL	90th	9	
2012	Multimatic Motorsports	GS	Aston Martin Vantage	C	DAY; 63/32	BAR; 72/32	HOM	NJ	MOH	ELK	WGL	IMS	LGA	LIM	NC‡	0‡	

‡ As Dempsey was a guest driver, he was ineligible to score points.

=== Complete Maserati Trofeo World Series results ===
(key)

Year	1	2	3	4	5	6	7	8	9	10	11	12	13	14	15	DC	Points	Ref
2012	JAR; 1	JAR; 2	ALG; 1	ALG; 2	ALG; 3	IMO; 1	IMO; 2	IMO; 3	LEC; 1	LEC; 2	SON; 1; 6	SON; 2	SON; 3 Ret	SHA; 1	SHA; 2	NC‡	0‡	

‡ As Dempsey was a guest driver, he was ineligible to score points.

=== Complete American Le Mans Series results ===
(key) (Results are overall/class)

Year	Entrant	Class	Chassis	Engine	Tyres	1	2	3	4	5	6	7	8	9	10	Rank	Points	Ref
2012	Dempsey Racing	LMP2	Lola B12/87	Judd-BMW HK 3.6 L V8	M	SEB	LBH	LGA; 30/4	LIM; 7/3	MOS	MOH; 9/4	ELK; 9/2	BAL	VIR	ATL; Ret	3rd	53	
2013	Dempsey Racing/Del Piero	GTC	Porsche 997 GT3 Cup	Porsche 4.0 L Flat-6	Y	SEB; 29/6	LBH; 26/6	LGA; 21/2	LIM; 30/7	MOS; 25/4	ELK; 27/4	BAL; 16/4	AUS; 23/3	VIR; 23/6	ATL; 23/2†	7th	87	

^{†} Did not complete sufficient laps in order to score points.

=== Complete United SportsCar Championship results ===
(key) (Results are overall/class)

Year	Entrant	Class	Chassis	Engine	1	2	3	4	5	6	7	8	9	10	11	Rank	Points	Ref
2014	Dempsey Racing	GTD	Porsche 911 GT America	Porsche 4.0 L Flat-6	DAY; 50/24	SEB; 42/15	LGA; 27/20	BEL	WGL; 23/4†	MOS; 27/11	IMS; 34/9	ELK; 40/13	VIR; 10/3	AUS; 41/14	ATL; 49/18†	24th	153	
2015	Wright Motorsports	GTD	Porsche 911 GT America	Porsche 4.0 L Flat-6	DAY; 13/3	SEB	LGA	BEL	WGL	LIM	ELK	VIR	AUS	ATL		33rd	31	

^{†} Did not complete sufficient laps in order to score points.
* Season still in progress.

=== Complete Porsche Supercup results ===
(key)

Year	Team	1	2	3	4	5	6	7	8	9	10	11	DC	Points	Ref
2014	Porsche AG	ESP	MON	AUT	GBR	GER; 23	HUN	BEL	ITA	USA	USA		NC‡	0‡	
2015	Porsche AG	ESP	MON	AUT	GBR	HUN	BEL; 29	BEL; 23	ITA	ITA	USA	USA	NC‡	0‡	

^{‡} As Dempsey was a guest driver, he was ineligible to score points.

=== Complete FIA World Endurance Championship results ===
Year	Entrant	Class	Car	Engine	1	2	3	4	5	6	7	8	Rank	Points
2015	Dempsey Racing-Proton	LMGTE Am	Porsche 911 RSR	Porsche 4.0 L Flat-6	SIL; 6	SPA; 5	LMS; 2	NÜR; 4	COA; 4	FUJ; 1	SHA; 4	BHR	6th	116

== Other ventures ==
=== Promotional work ===
He has been the face of L'Oreal and Versace and was featured in ads for Serengeti sunglasses. In November 2008, he launched an Avon fragrance named Unscripted. In June 2009, Women's Wear Daily reported the launch of a second Avon fragrance named Patrick Dempsey 2. The fragrance was recognized as the "Men's Private Label/Direct Sell" for the 2010 FiFi Awards. On September 29, 2012, Mexican cable company Cablemás, Megacable and Mexico city's Cablevisión launched an advertising campaign featuring Dempsey as the love interest of a domestic worker who comes across his profile on an online dating site.

Starting in 2013, Patrick Dempsey became the face of Silhouette, promoting eyewear fashion from Austria. Since January 2017 Dempsey has appeared in commercials for Vodafone Italy. In 2018, Bleusalt, a Malibu-based fashion brand launched a clothing line designed by the actor.

=== Business interests ===
In January 2013, Dempsey announced that his company (Global Baristas) had secured the winning bid to purchase Seattle-based Tully's Coffee, which had filed for Chapter 11 bankruptcy protection in October. Dempsey's bid of $9.15M was enough to secure Tully's over the bids of six others, including Starbucks. Dempsey's company will control 47 Tully's locations in the Seattle area, but not the online business, which had been purchased by Green Mountain Coffee Roasters in 2009.

Following a legal dispute with investor group Global Baristas, Dempsey left the group, in effect officially leaving his managerial positions with Tully's. Dempsey filed a lawsuit on behalf of Global Baristas, claiming Michael Avenatti borrowed $2 million against Tully's assets without informing Dempsey, rather than fully financing the coffee chain as was promised, calling the 15 percent interest rate on the loan "exorbitant" and sued for Avenatti to fund Tully's operations and meet its working capital needs, as well as for any damages owed the company. Soon after, Dempsey's lawyer's office issued a statement saying the partnership was dissolved and that Dempsey wished the lawyer and the company "all the best". Avenatti has stated the dispute was a "misunderstanding" and will continue operating with other investors and new management.

=== Philanthropy ===
In 1997, Dempsey's mother, Amanda, was diagnosed with cancer which subsequently relapsed five times. On March 24, 2014, she died in Lewiston, Maine, aged 79. In response to his mother's bouts with cancer, Dempsey helped start the Patrick Dempsey Center at Central Maine Medical Center in Lewiston. In October 2009, when Dempsey introduced the first Dempsey Challenge, registration was closed after reaching the goal of 3,500 cyclists, runners and walkers. The event raised more than $1 million for the cancer center. His mother was in the crowd as Dempsey finished his 50-mile (80 km) ride. The Challenge has since become an annual October event presented by Amgen in the Lewiston–Auburn area. On May 28, 2017, Dempsey received an honorary doctorate from Bates College in his hometown, Lewiston, Maine, for his philanthropy in the town and funding of "the Dempsey Center — just blocks from the Bates campus."

Dempsey was awarded an honorary doctorate by Bowdoin College in 2013 for his philanthropic work. His Grey's Anatomy character Derek Shepherd had been written as a Bowdoin graduate after an alumnus led a petition signed by over 450 students to "adopt" the character as an alumnus.

In 2023, Dempsey helped raise funds for families of the Lewiston shooting victims. He joined a charity softball tournament with former Boston Red Sox pitcher Bill "Spaceman" Lee.

In 2025, Dempsey appeared in the PBS documentary "Caregiving", produced by Bradley Cooper, in which he highlighted his caretaking story for his mother.

== Personal life ==
Dempsey was diagnosed with dyslexia at age 12. As a result, it is necessary for him to memorize all his lines to perform, even for auditions where he is unlikely to get the part.

Entertainment Weekly put Dempsey's hair on its end-of-the-decade "best-of" list, saying, "What made Grey's Anatomy a mega-medi-hit? It could have something to do with creator Shonda Rhimes's scalpel-sharp writing… or McDreamy's impossibly luxurious man hair. Just saying." In 2005, People magazine ranked him second in its annual list of "Sexiest Men Alive" and again in 2006. Dempsey was named People magazine's 2023 "Sexiest Man Alive" for its November 2023 issue.

Dempsey has been married twice. In 1987, he married his manager, actress and acting coach, Rochelle "Rocky" Parker, when he was 21 and she was 48. She appeared with Dempsey in the film In the Mood. While it has been reported that Dempsey married his best friend's mother, he has said that he became best friends with Parker's son Corey only after he became romantically involved with Parker. The couple divorced on April 26, 1994. She died in 2014.

On July 31, 1999, Dempsey married makeup artist Jillian Fink. The couple have three children. In January 2015, Fink filed for divorce, but the couple reconciled later in the year. They called off their divorce on November 12, 2016. Dempsey owned a home in Harpswell, Maine, near his hometown. His mother moved into a farm next to his home. Dempsey is a supporter of Scottish football club Rangers F.C. because of his Scottish connection through his step-grandfather.

In July 2026, following controversies surrounding Maine Democratic U.S. Senate nominee Graham Platner, Dempsey's name was floated to step in as a replacement candidate to challenge incumbent Republican Senator Susan Collins. On July 8, Dempsey declined to put his name forward in a Portland Press Herald op-ed, stating that while he gave the race "real thought," he could contribute more effectively to his home state through his existing philanthropic work rather than full-time political office.

== Filmography ==
=== Film ===
Year	Title	Role	Notes
1985	Heaven Help Us	Corbet	
1986	Meatballs III: Summer Job	Rudy Gerner	
1987	Can't Buy Me Love	Ronald Miller	
1987	In the Mood	Ellsworth 'Sonny' Wisecarver	
1988	Some Girls	Michael	
1988	In a Shallow Grave	Potter Daventry	
1989	Loverboy	Randy Bodek	
1989	Happy Together	Christopher Wooden	
1990	Coupe de Ville	Robert 'Bobby' Libner	
1991	Mobsters	Meyer Lansky	
1991	Run	Charlie Farrow	
1993	Bank Robber	Billy	
1993	Face the Music	Charlie Hunter	
1994	With Honors	Everett Calloway	
1994	Ava's Magical Adventure	Jeffrey	Also director
1995	Outbreak	Jimbo Scott	
1997	Hugo Pool	Floyd Gaylen	
1998	Denial	Sam	
1998	The Escape	Clayton	
2000	Scream 3	Mark Kincaid	
2002	Sweet Home Alabama	Andrew Hennings	
2002	The Emperor's Club	Older Louis Masoudi	
2004	Iron Jawed Angels	Ben Weissman	
2006	Brother Bear 2	Kenai (voice)	Direct-to-video
2007	Freedom Writers	Scott Casey	
2007	Enchanted	Robert Philip	
2008	Made of Honor	Tom Bailey	
2010	Valentine's Day	Harrison Copeland	
2011	Transformers: Dark of the Moon	Dylan Gould	
2011	Flypaper	Tripp	Also producer
2013	Ushi Must Marry	Himself	
2016	Bridget Jones's Baby	Jack Qwant	
2019	Hurley	Himself	Also producer
2019	The Art of Racing in the Rain	None	Producer
2022	Disenchanted	Robert Philip	
2023	Ferrari	Piero Taruffi	
2023	Thanksgiving	Eric Newlon	

=== Television ===
Year	Title	Role	Notes
1986	Fast Times	Mike Damone	Recurring role
1986	A Fighting Choice	Kellin Taylor	Television film
1989	The Super Mario Bros. Super Show!	The Plant (voice)	Episode: "Super Plant", also production manager
1993	JFK: Reckless Youth	John F. Kennedy	Miniseries
1996	The Right to Remain Silent	Tom Harris	Film
1996	A Season in Purgatory	Harrison Burns	Miniseries
1997	20,000 Leagues Under the Sea	Pierre Arronax	Miniseries
1998	Jeremiah	Jeremiah	Television film
1998	Crime and Punishment	Raskolnikov	Television film
2000–2001	Will & Grace	Matthew	3 episodes
2000; 2002	Once and Again	Aaron Brooks	4 episodes
2001	Blonde	Cass Bulut	Television film
2003	Lucky 7	Peter Connor	Television film
2003	Karen Sisco	Carl Wilkens	Episode: Blown Away
2004	The Practice	Paul Stewart	3 episodes
2005–2015; 2020–2021	Grey's Anatomy	Dr. Derek Shepherd	Main role (seasons 1–11); recurring (season 17)
2009, 2012	Private Practice	Dr. Derek Shepherd	2 episodes
2014	Phineas and Ferb	Paolo Vanderbeek (voice)	Episode: "Live and Let Drive"
2017	Red Nose Day Actually	Sarah's Husband	Short film
2018	The Truth About the Harry Quebert Affair	Harry Quebert	Miniseries
2020–2022	Devils	Dominic Morgan	Main role
2021	Ways & Means	Unknown	Pilot, also executive producer
2024–2025	Dexter: Original Sin	Captain Aaron Spencer	Main role
2025	Dexter: Resurrection	Captain Aaron Spencer	Photograph: "The Kill Room Where It Happens"
2026	Family Guy	Himself (voice)	Episode: "Dear Francis"
2026–present	Memory of a Killer	Angelo Doyle	Main role

== Awards and nominations ==
Year	Association	Category	Nominated work	Result	Ref.
1987	Young Artist Awards	Best Young Actor in a Motion Picture – Comedy	Can't Buy Me Love	Won	
2000	Primetime Emmy Awards	Outstanding Guest Actor in a Drama Series	Once and Again	Nominated	
2005	Golden Globe Awards	Best Actor – Television Series Drama	Grey's Anatomy	Nominated	
2005	Screen Actors Guild Awards	Outstanding Performance by a Male Actor in a Drama Series	Grey's Anatomy	Nominated	
2006	Golden Globe Awards	Best Actor – Television Series Drama	Grey's Anatomy	Nominated	
2006	Screen Actors Guild Awards	Outstanding Performance by an Ensemble in a Drama Series	Grey's Anatomy	Won	
2006	Teen Choice Awards	Choice TV Actor Drama	Grey's Anatomy	Nominated	
2007	People's Choice Awards	Favorite Male TV Star	Grey's Anatomy	Won	
2007	Screen Actors Guild Awards	Outstanding Performance by an Ensemble in a Drama Series	Grey's Anatomy	Nominated	
2008	People's Choice Awards	Favorite Male TV Star	Grey's Anatomy	Won	
2008	Teen Choice Awards	Choice TV Actor Drama	Grey's Anatomy	Nominated	
2008	MTV Movie Award	Best Kiss (with Amy Adams)	Enchanted	Nominated	
2008	National Movie Awards	Best Performance — Male	Enchanted	Nominated	
2009	People's Choice Awards	Favorite TV Drama Actor	Grey's Anatomy	Nominated	
2010	People's Choice Awards	Favorite TV Drama Actor	Grey's Anatomy	Nominated	
2011	People's Choice Awards	Favorite TV Drama Actor	Grey's Anatomy	Nominated	
2011	People's Choice Awards	Favorite TV Doctor	Grey's Anatomy	Nominated	
2011	Golden Raspberry Awards	Worst Supporting Actor	Transformers: Dark of the Moon	Nominated	
2012	People's Choice Awards	Favorite TV Drama Actor	Grey's Anatomy	Nominated	
2014	People's Choice Awards	Favorite TV Drama Actor	Grey's Anatomy	Nominated	
2014	People's Choice Awards	Favorite On-Screen Chemistry (with Ellen Pompeo)	Grey's Anatomy	Nominated	
2015	People's Choice Awards	Favorite TV Drama Actor	Grey's Anatomy	Won	

- In 2022 Dempsey was honored with a Disney Legend Award
- In 2023 Dempsey was named as People's Sexiest Man Alive

== See also ==
- List of people from Maine
