= Bruce Isaacson =

American poet and publisher (born 1956)

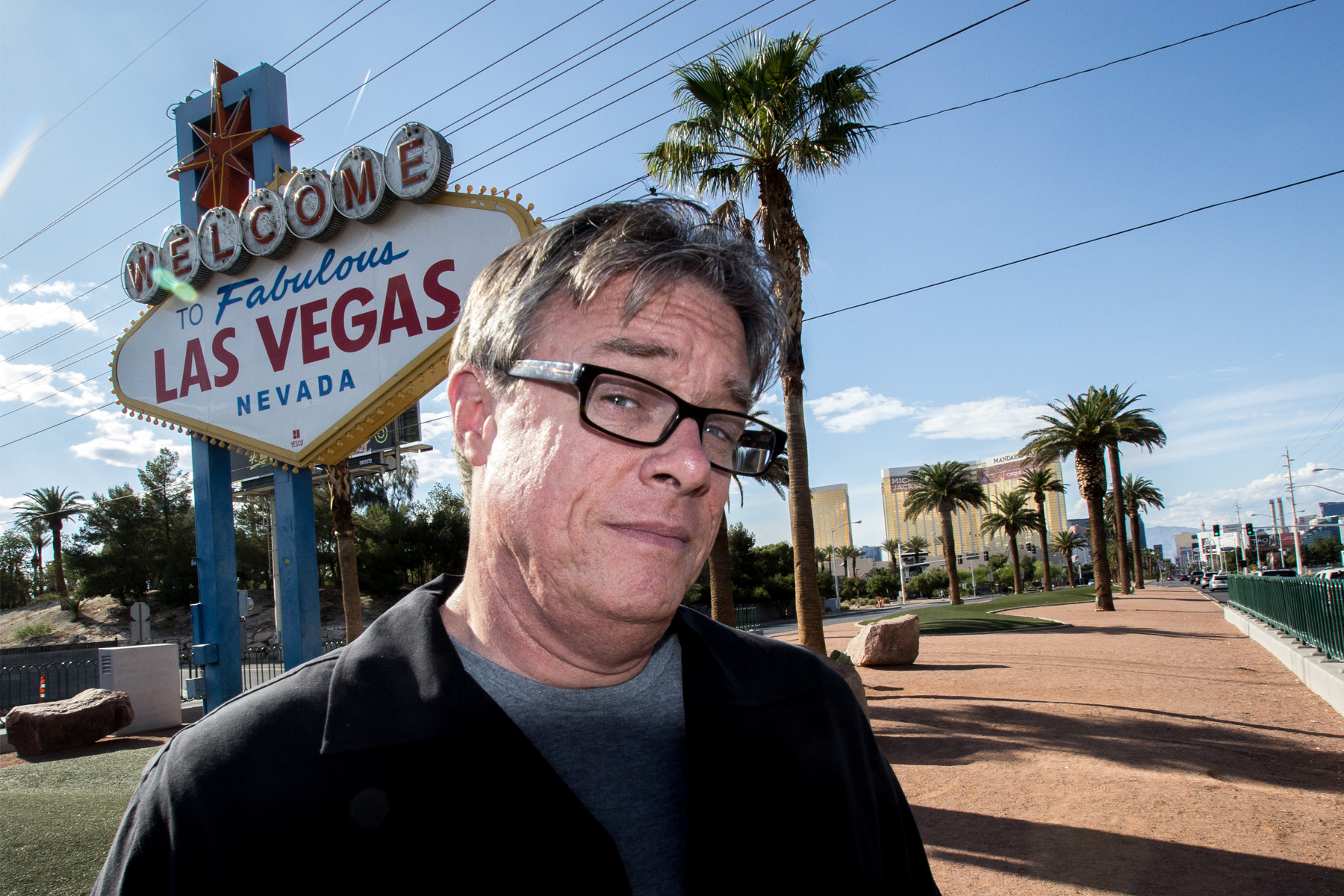
- Born: 1956 (age 69–70)
- Occupation: Poet
- Known for: Poet laureate of Clark County, Nevada

Bruce Isaacson (born 1956) is an American poet and publisher. He was appointed the first poet laureate of Clark County, Nevada, a community of more than two million people where Las Vegas is located, June 1, 2016 He initiated the Poets of National Stature series there, which includes readings by Juan Felipe Hererra, the sitting Poet Laureate of the United States and Beat Legend Michael McClure. Other poets Isaacson brought previously to Las Vegas include beat feminist icon Diane di Prima, San Francisco Poet Laureate Jack Hirshman, NY Beat Poet Laureate, Andy Clausen, and others.

Bruce Isaacson is best known in San Francisco Bay Area poetry as an organizer and poet in the Café Babar readings, an anarchistic poetry free-for all which led the poetry resurgence of the mid-1980s. These readings helped inaugurate a new presentation style and aesthetic often called SF Spoken Word; the poets were called "Babarians". His work is included in "The Babarians" section of Alan Kaufman and S. A. Griffin's The Outlaw Bible of American Poetry, and in New American Underground Poetry, Volume 1, The Barbarians of San Francisco - Poets From Hell. With David Lerner, Isaacson founded Zeitgeist Press in 1986 to publish the work of the Babarians. Isaacson and Lerner were sometimes referred to as the T.S. Eliot and Ezra Pound of the Babarians. Zeitgeist focused on work from that genre, and a few notable Las Vegas writers, producing more than 100 titles in total. Isaacson today serves as publisher and co-editor.

Bruce Isaacson was involved in poetry also in other cities. In New York City, he was a surprise finalist in the first season of the famed Poetry Slam at the Nuyorican Poets Café. In Los Angeles, Isaacson was one of the featured poets at the Poetry in Motion series at Helena’s and Largo (Hollywood) and at Tommy Tang’s in NYC. These readings mixed long-term poets with poetry performances by some of Hollywood’s actors. Isaacson also lived seven months in Leningrad immediately after the opening to the West in 1992. He was involved in poetry activities at the Leningrad Writers Union. His poem, "Rolling into Red Square" appears in Signs of Life: Channel-surfing Through '90s Culture. He has also lived in Michoacan, Mexico, moved to Las Vegas in 1995, and was active in many Las Vegas poetry communities, including readings at the Café Espresso Roma and Enigma Garden Cafe. His work appears in Literary Nevada: Writings from the Silver State.

== Education ==
He earned degrees at Dartmouth College, Claremont McKenna, and Brooklyn College, where American poet Allen Ginsberg read his MFA thesis.

== Publications ==
His full-length books from Zeitgeist Press include Bad Dog Blues (1988), Love Affairs with Barely Any People in Them (1990), Ghosts Among the Neon (2005), and Dumbstruck at the Lights in the Sky (2008).
