= San Domenico =

San Domenico may refer to:

== Catholic saints ==
- Dominic de Guzmán (1170-1221), Spanish priest and founder of the Dominican Order
- San Domenico di Sora (951-1031), Italian abbot, patron saint of Villalago

== Churches ==
- San Domenico, Arezzo (Basilica), Italy
- San Domenico (Basilica), Bologna, Italy
- San Domenico, Casale Monferrato, Italy
- San Domenico, Cortona, Italy
- San Domenico, Cosenza, Italy
- San Domenico, Cremona, Italy (no longer standing)
- San Domenico, Cagli, Italy
- San Domenico, Erice, Italy
- Convent of San Domenico, Fiesole, Italy
- San Domenico, Gubbio, Italy
- San Domenico Maggiore, Naples, Italy
- San Domenico, Noto, Italy
- San Domenico, Orvieto, Italy
- San Domenico, Palermo, Italy
- San Domenico, Penne, Italy
- San Domenico, Perugia, Italy
- San Domenico (Pisa), Italy
- San Domenico, Pistoia, Italy
- San Domenico, Prato, Italy
- Santi Domenico e Sisto, Rome, Italy
- Basilica of San Domenico, Siena, Italy
- San Domenico Convent, Taormina in Taormina, Sicily, Italy
- San Domenico, Val di Noto, Italy
- San Domenico, Karaköy in Istanbul, Turkey

== Other ==
- Lago di San Domenico, L'Aquila, Italy
- San Domenico School, San Anselmo, California
- San Domenico (horse), Australian racehorse

== See also ==
- St Dominic (disambiguation)
- Santo Domingo (disambiguation)
