= My Women =

Short story collection by Yuliia Iliukha

My Women (Ukrainian: Мої жінки), is a Ukrainian short story collection by Ukrainian writer Yuliia Iliukha. It was translated into English by Hanna Leliv.

The collection was named the 2024 BBC Ukraine Book of the Year. It also won the 128 LIT 2023 International Chapbook Prize.

== Reviews ==
A review in New Eastern Europe described the collection as a "poignant, inescapable short story collection about women confronted by the horrific brutalities of the Russo-Ukrainian War".
