= St. Dominic High School =

St. Dominic High School can refer to:

- St. Dominic High School (Missouri)
- St. Dominic High School (New York)
- St. Dominic Regional High School in Auburn, Maine
- St. Dominic Catholic High School in Kaohsiung, Taiwan
- St. Dominic Catholic Secondary School (Bracebridge, Ontario)

== See also ==
- St Dominic (disambiguation)
- St. Joseph Hospital light rail station, of which name of secondary station is St. Dominic Catholic High School, a light rail station of Circular light rail, Kaohsiung, Taiwan
