= Ellsworth Wisecarver =

American delinquent

Ellsworth Clewer "Sonny" Wisecarver Jr. (15 June 1929 – 22 November 2005), called the Woo Woo Kid, was an American who became infamous as a teen in 1944 for having affairs with older women.

== May 1944 ==
His behavior sparked public scandal, primarily because of his age. At age 14, between 8 May 1944 and 15 May 1944, Wisecarver eloped from Los Angeles, with an unmarried 21-year-old mother of two, Elaine (née Ludlum) Monfredi.

“Sonny is an ideal husband, the kind every girl wants to have. He is kind and considerate and doesn’t believe in hitting women.” - Elaine (née Ludlum) Monfredi

“I think Elaine’s the kind of wife I want because she likes to have a good time without getting drunk.” - Ellsworth Wisecarver

== November 1945 ==
A year later, again Wisecarver fled with another woman, Eleanor Deveny, 25, the wife of Corporal John Deveny (in Japan), and mother of two children, who was taken into custody in Butte County, California. Wisecarver was arrested and charged a second time. Eleanor Deveny was charged with contributing to the delinquency of a minor.

His parents had Wisecarver declared an incorrigible delinquent. He spent time in the California Youth Authority, a state penal facility for juveniles.

== February 1947 ==
In February 1947, at Las Vegas, Nev., Wisecarver, who turned 18, was looking for a job, so he could marry someone who was 16.

== October 1948 ==
In October 1948, Wisecarver, who was 19, and after 18 months of marriage, found his wife had gone home to her mother. Wisecarver said: “I guess I haven’t been as good a husband as I should.”

== Later life ==
Wisecarver spent his final days in a mobile home in Yucaipa, California, in the United States. He died of lung cancer at the age of 76, at a Veterans hospital in Loma Linda, California. An Air Force veteran of the Korean War, Wisecarver is buried in Riverside National Cemetery in Riverside, California.

== Legacy ==
In the July 1973 satirical book, The Rape of the A*P*E* — The Official History of the Sex Revolution 1945–1973: The Obscening of America. An R.S.V.P. Document, written by the musician and satirist, Allan Sherman, he credits the Wisecarver scandal and resulting publicity as the official start of the American sexual revolution.

Wisecarver's scandalous affairs were the basis for the 1987 film In the Mood, in which Wisecarver makes a cameo appearance as a mailman. Patrick Dempsey played the role of Wisecarver. An interview with Wisecarver also appears on the original VHS of the movie.
