= Dominic (disambiguation) =

Dominic is a male given name.

Dominic may also refer to:

== Fiction ==
- Dominic Flandry, a central character in Poul Anderson's Technic History science fiction
- Dominic Fortune, a comic book character
- Dominic Greene, a primary antagonist in the James Bond film Quantum of Solace
- The Flipside of Dominick Hide, a time traveller in 1980 BBC play
- Dominic Reilly, a character on the long-running British soap opera Hollyoaks
- Dominic Santini, a character on the series Airwolf
- Dominic Sorel, a character in the 2005–2006 anime and manga series Eureka Seven
- Dominic Toretto, a character from The Fast and the Furious
- Dominic, a 1972 children's book by William Steig

== Other ==
- Operation Dominic I and II, a series of 105 nuclear test explosions conducted in 1962 and 1963 by the United States
- Dominic system, a mnemonic system

== See also ==
- Dominica, a country
- Dominique (disambiguation)
- St Dominic (disambiguation)
- St. Dominic's Church (disambiguation)
