= The Guide to Getting it On =

Sexuality book by Paul N. Joannides

The Guide To Getting It On! is a sexuality guide by research psychoanalyst Paul Joannides, illustrated by the comic book artist Dærick Gröss Sr. A 10th edition was released in 2022.

== Style ==
The book uses informal language and quotations extensively to illustrate the points the author makes. These quotations are from males and females, of a broad age range, that the author has interviewed during his research or who sent letters to him after the publication of previous editions of the book.

It is illustrated throughout with realistic body drawings. It also uses comic-like drawings to maintain a light-hearted approach, such as a drawing of a vagina and a penis, both with eyes, a mouth, a nose, hands and feet having a dialogue.

== English editions ==
In the English language, Guide to Getting It On! has ten editions.

1. Guide To Getting It On! A New and Mostly Wonderful Book About Sex for Adults of All Ages (1st edition, June 1996) ISBN 1-885535-14-7. 376 pages.
2. Guide To Getting It On! A New and Mostly Wonderful Book About Sex for Adults of All Ages (2nd edition, September 1998) ISBN 1-885535-00-7. 432 pages.
3. Guide To Getting It On! (3rd edition, February 2000) ISBN 1-885535-10-4. 698 pages.
4. Guide To Getting It On! (4th edition, April 2004) ISBN 1-885535-67-8. 782 pages.
5. Guide To Getting It On! (5th edition, September 2006) ISBN 978-1-885535-69-6. 854 pages.
6. Guide To Getting It On! (6th edition, January 2009) ISBN 978-1-885535-33-7. 992 pages.
7. Guide To Getting It On! (7th edition, October 2012) ISBN 1885535759. 1,184 pages.
8. Guide To Getting It On! (8th edition, April 2015) ISBN 978-1885535450. 1,152 pages.
9. Guide To Getting It On: Unzipped (9th edition, 2017) ISBN 978-1-885535-17-7. 624 pages.
10. Guide To Getting It On (10th edition, 2022) ISBN 978-1-885535-04-7. 810 pages.

== Translations ==
The Guide To Getting It On! has been translated into 14 languages: Brazilian Portuguese, Czech, Croatian, German (Wild Thing: Sex-Tips for Boys and Girls), Hebrew, Hungarian, Italian, Korean, Norwegian, Polish, Ukrainian, Russian, Serbian and Slovenian.

== Reviews ==
- Oprah Magazine reports ″You've never read a manual as warm, friendly, liberating, thorough, and potentially sex-life-changing as the Guide to Getting It On!"
- Perry Tsai, Co-director American Medical Student Association Sexual Health Scholars Program (AMSA SHSP) “Very few medical schools are teaching about the importance of sexual pleasure, so doctors are not prepared to care for this aspect of their patients’ health and well-being. We use the Guide to Getting It On to help our scholars gain a more complete understanding of sexuality and to help them promote the sexual health of their patients and peers.”
- Christian Perring points out that ″the book contains answers to just about every sexual question″ the readers of The Guide to Getting it On ″ever had″. He criticizes, however, that the readers of the book might have trouble in finding the answers to their questions.

== Awards ==
Guide To Getting It On! has won the following awards:

- American Association of Sex Educators, Counselors and Therapists Book Award
- Ben Franklin Book Award
- Firecracker Alternative Book Award
- Sexuality.org Best Heterosexual Book Award
- USABookNews.com Best Book Award
- American Foundation for Gender & Genital Medicine Book Award
- Independent Press Award for Sexuality, 2022
