= Bob Fingerman =

American comic book writer/artist

- Born: Robert Fingerman; August 25, 1964 (age 62) Queens, New York
- Areas: Cartoonist, Writer, Artist
- Notable works: Minimum Wage / Beg the Question

Bob Fingerman (born August 25, 1964) is an American comic book writer/artist born in Queens, New York, who is best known for his comic series Minimum Wage (Fantagraphics Books).

== Career ==
In 1984, while still a student at New York City’s School of Visual Arts, he produced work for Harvey Kurtzman's short-lived young readers anthology Nuts! and signed a contract to produce a series of comical parodies of the Italian comic series RanXerox exclusively for the European market, including France’s L'Écho des savanes and Comics USA and Spain’s El Vibora. After he made friends with guys working at Forbidden Planet who were forming a ska band, The Toasters, he drew the front and back cover for their first LP in 1985. Fingerman worked in the disparate fields of children's satire, pornography and illustration, producing work regularly for Cracked magazine, Screw, Penthouse, Hot Talk, Heavy Metal, National Lampoon, High Times, the Village Voice and other periodicals.

In 1990, he decided to focus on comics. He did a year-long stint on the Teenage Mutant Ninja Turtles, as well as several titles for the Eros Comix line of adult comics, including Skinheads in Love (which drew praise from The Village Voice Literary Supplement) and Bloodsucker, a collaboration with punk icon Lydia Lunch. He also created covers and short stories for Dark Horse Comics and DC Comics’ Vertigo imprint.

In 1993, Fingerman wrote and drew his first graphic novel, White Like She, a science fiction social satire about a middle-aged black man whose brain is transplanted into a white teenage girl's head.

Upon completion of this purely fictional work, Fingerman decided to turn his attention inward. The result was the semi-autobiographical series, Minimum Wage (Fantagraphics Books), which in 2002 was collected and extensively reworked as the Fantagraphics graphic novel, Beg the Question (and which was nominated for both an Ignatz Award as well as two Eisner Awards). Minimum Wage Book 2: Tales of Hoffman won the 1998 Firecracker Alternative Book Award in the Graphic Novel category.

Fingerman has broadened his palette, turning to prose, and continuing to work in comics. His books include the humor collection You Deserved It; Zombie World: Winter’s Dregs & Other Stories, the zombie graphic novel; Recess Pieces (described on Fangoria's website as "The Little Rascals meets Dawn of the Dead"); and his debut prose novel, Bottomfeeder. In 2009, his releases included the trippy illustrated novella Connective Tissue.

In March 2010, his satirical post-apocalyptic "speculative memoir" From the Ashes was released as a graphic novel. In August 2010, Pariah, a dark comedic look at people surviving a zombie onslaught, was published by Tor Books. Pariah is the second of Fingerman's prose novels. In April 2013, the definitive "Maximum Minimum Wage" was released from Image Comics. Work on that collection reignited Fingerman's desire to continue that story. In 2014, after a fifteen-year hiatus, two new arcs of Minimum Wage were published by Image Comics, "Focus on the Strange" and "So Many Bad Decisions". Both were collected in trade paperbacks. 2014 also saw the release of the 20th anniversary edition of Fingerman's first graphic novel, White Like She.

In 2018 Fingerman started working for MAD magazine, creating two character-driven strips for their new Potrzebie Comics section. The first was "Boonies Burbs and Burgs," which featured three cousins' adventures. The second, MAD's first serial strip, was "Lukey and Mukey," about a dimwitted child and his errant mucus-based clone. In 2020, Heavy Metal released Dotty's Inferno, through their new Virus imprint.

In January 2022, a heavily revised edition of the novel Pariah was released as Pariah: Redux, also through Heavy Metal.

== Bibliography ==
=== Comics and graphic novels ===
- Atomic Age Truckstop Waitress, #1 (Eros Comix, July 1991)
- Skinheads in Love (Fantagraphics, Feb. 1992)
- Bloodsucker (with Lydia Lunch, Fantagraphics, August 1992)
- Teenage Mutant Ninja Turtles Adventures (April O'Neil: The May East Saga #1-3, TMNT Adventures Special #6-7; Archie Comics, 1993)
- 2099 Unlimited #2, #10 (Marvel Comics, Oct. 1993, 1996)
- White Like She #1-4 (Fantagraphics, 1994)
- Rock & Roll High School #1–2 (with Shane Oakley and Jason Lutes) (Roger Corman's Cosmic Comics, 1995)
- Minimum Wage vol. 2 #1-10 (Fantagraphics, 1995–1999)
- ZombieWorld: Winter's Dregs #1-4 (Dark Horse Comics, 1998), included in ZombieWorld: Winter's Dregs & Other Stories (TPB, Dark Horse, 2005)
- Monkey Jank #1 (Fantagraphics, 2000)
- Beg The Question (hardcover, Fantagraphics, 2002), reworked version of Minimum Wage volume 2.
- You Deserved It (TPB, Dark Horse, 2005), collects material from Big Blown Baby #3 and Otis Goes Hollywood #1 & #2.
- Recess Pieces graphic novel (Dark Horse, 2006)
- From the Ashes #1-6 (IDW Publishing, 2009); collected as From the Ashes TPB (IDW, 2010)
- Maximum Minimum Wage graphic novel (Image Comics, 2013)

=== Novels ===
- Bottomfeeder (M Press, 2006)
- Pariah (Tor Books, 2010)

=== Illustrated novellas ===
- Connective Tissue (Fantagraphics, 2009)
