= Steve Diet Goedde =

American fetish photographer (born 1965)

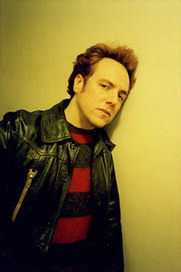
- Photo courtesy of Steve Diet Goedde.
- Born: February 20, 1965 (age 61); St. Louis, Missouri
- Education: Art Institute of Chicago
- Known for: Photography

Steve Diet Goedde (born Steven Paul Goedde on February 20, 1965) is an American fetish photographer.

"Diet" is a nickname from "Coma Diet," a past musical project.

According to one reviewer, Goedde's photos "are what Ansel Adams might have made if he were into S&M."

== Monograph books ==
- Phovella (DietWrite Publications, Chicago, 1994)
- The Beauty of Fetish (Edition Stemmle, Zurich, 1998) ISBN 3-908161-19-3 — winner of a 1999 Firecracker Alternative Book Award
- The Beauty of Fetish: Volume 2 (Edition Stemmle, Zurich, 2001) ISBN 3-908163-42-0
- ARRANGEMENTS: Volume III (Century Guild, Los Angeles, 2015)
- Upcoming Untitled Book (Circa Press, London)

== Other media ==
- Living Through Steve Diet Goedde DVD (SlishPix, Los Angeles, 2005)
- GoeddeConcerto CD (ReadyMade Music, Nice France, 2009) Music by Robert Waechter.

== Solo Gallery and Museum Shows ==
2018

- Collaboration (with painter Alex Couwenberg), Coagula Curatorial, Los Angeles CA

2016

- ARRANGEMENTS, Century Guild, Culver City CA
- Instances, Garboushian Gallery, Beverly Hills CA
- VARIATIONS, Sin City Gallery, Las Vegas NV

2013

- The Modern Vintage, The Landmark, Hong Kong China

2012

- New Works, Sin City Gallery, Las Vegas NV

2011

- Dream Menagerie, Sin City Gallery, Las Vegas NV

2010

- Intimate Captures, Sugar Lilie dessous prives, Los Angeles CA

2002

- New Work 2002, Madame S Gallery, San Francisco CA

2000

- Photographs from the American West, Feitico Gallery, Chicago IL

1994

- Some Folks Call It a Sling Blade (one-night-show featuring Goedde's photography for the making of the critically acclaimed short film "Some Folks Call It a Sling Blade"), St. Louis Art Museum, St. Louis MO
