= S.A. Griffin =

American poet and actor (b. 1954)

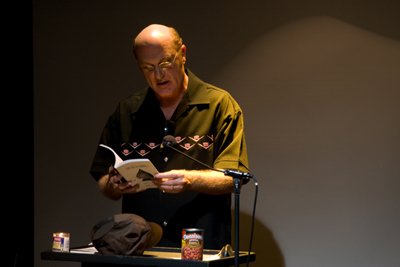
- S.A. Griffin speaking at Beyond Baroque Literary Arts Center, Los Angeles
- Born: March 16, 1954 (age 72); San Antonio, Texas, U.S.
- Occupations: Actor, Poet
- Years active: 1980–present
- Spouses: Nala Northington (m. 1974; div. 1977) Sharon Grish (m. 1984; div. 1990) Lorraine Perrotta (m. 2000)

S.A. Griffin (born March 16, 1954) is an American poet, actor, performance artist, and publisher. He co-edited The Outlaw Bible of American Poetry. He spells his name without a space between the first two initials.

== Biography ==
Griffin was born in San Antonio, Texas, the oldest of six children. He grew up in the San Francisco East Bay, primarily in the Easter Hill Village housing project in Richmond, California. He graduated from Castro Valley High School in the fall of 1972, and voluntarily enlisted in the United States Air Force. Upon completion of his four-year tour of duty, he returned to the East Bay, living in Hayward, California and the Haight-Ashbury district of San Francisco. In September 1978, he was awarded a scholarship to attend the Los Angeles Civic Light Opera workshop, and relocated to Los Angeles, where he still lives.

Since 1979, Griffin has worked on stage and on camera as a professional actor with notable directors such as Clint Eastwood, Burt Reynolds, Kathryn Bigelow, Ivan Reitman, Douglas Trumbull, Joe Pytka, Jeremy Podeswa, Stephen Kessler, Leslie Dektor, and Jeremiah S. Chechik. He is Drama-Logue Award (stage) and Kari Award (commercials) winner, and has appeared in over 150 commercials.

In the 1980s, Griffin began appearing in poetry anthologies, periodicals, and publishing poetry. His writing is influenced by the Beat Generation, Charles Bukowski, punk rock, and Dada. He is an adviser on the curatorial council of Beyond Baroque Literary Arts Center, and in 2011 was the first recipient of Beyond Baroque's Distinguished Service Award. During the 1990s, until its close in 1998, he was a regular at the Onyx Cafe in Los Feliz, producing a number of performances and poetry-reading series there. He toured extensively throughout the United States with three poetry performance groups of which he was a founding member: The Lost Tribe (1985-1992), The Carma Bums (1989-2009) and White Trash Apocalypse (1995-1997). Writer Wanda Coleman named him "L.A.'s Best Performance Poet" for The LA Weekly in 1989, and editor Lucinda Michele Knapp called him the "should-be poet laureate of Los Angeles" in the Los Angeles Alternative Press.

Griffin founded his imprint, Rose of Sharon press, in 1989 with the publication of Sharktalk by Doug Knott. He also published and edited the underground poetry journals The Fool, (Sic) Vice & Verse, and MEAT, and worked on the editorial staff for Shattersheet and The Moment. He is the co-editor of The Outlaw Bible of American Poetry which received the Firecracker Alternative Book Award in 2000. He co-founded H.I.P. (Hollywood Institute of Poetics) and WWWRN (World Wide Word Radio Network) Blog Talk Radio. In his attempts to bring poetry to a wider audience, outside of publishing broadsides, chapbooks, and periodicals, Griffin has placed poems on billboards and beer bottles.

In 2010 Griffin adapted a 1970 240-MK Vietnam War-era practice bomb to house poetry instead of explosives, gathering over 900 poems from around the world. American pinstripe artist and fabricator Skratch pinstriped the bomb, which Griffin named Elsie in honor of his paternal grandmother. Between April and June 2010, Griffin toured with Elsie the Poetry Bomb across the United States, appearing at 30 different venues, and inviting people to put their poems inside. Of the inspiration behind the project, he said:

"War, the art, artifact and artifice of war were created to invent and enforce agreements. Hopefully by transforming this piece I have created something that will inspire disagreements. The democratic process depends upon disagreement in order to function.... The Poetry Bomb is a weapon of mass discussion."

In 2015, the S.A. Griffin collection of underground poetry, Scott Wannberg, and The Carma Bums, circa 1950-2015 was archived at UCLA, becoming the first acquisition of UCLA's Punk Archive.

== Books ==
=== Author ===
- The Lost Tribe (1985) with The Lost Tribe
- Without Skin (1989) with Justice Howard
- A One Legged Man Standing Casually On Hollywood Blvd. Smoking A Cigarette (Shelf Life Press, 1989)
- etc. (Rose of Sharon Press, 1993)
- Heaven Is One Long Naked Dance (Rose of Sharon Press, 1994)
- Alien Landing Pad (Rose of Sharon Press, 1995) with Iris Berry and Pleasant Gehman
- Twisted Cadillac (Sacred Beverage Press, 1996) with The Carma Bums
- The Bad Thing (Phony Lid Publications, 2000)
- Unborn Again (Phony Lid, 2001) Duckwalking Thru The Apocalypse (Bottle of Smoke Press, 2003)
- Armageddon Outta Here! (Rose of Sharon Press, 2004) with The Carma Bums
- Harvey Keitel, Harvey Keitel, Harvey Keitel (Butcher Shop Press, Rose of Sharon, Temple of Man, 2005) with John Dorsey and Scott Wannberg
- 2 (greenpanda press, 2006) with John Dorsey
- Virgin Erotica (greenpanda press, 2006) with John Dorsey
- Numbskull Sutra (Rank Stranger Press, 2007)
- John & Sarah Do D.C. (Bottle of Speech, 2008)
- The Electric President (Rose of Sharon Press, 2008)
- The Fucker Inside (Tainted Coffee Press, 2008)
- They Swear We Don't Exist (Bottle of Smoke, 2010)
- Dreams Gone Mad With Hope on (Punk Hostage Press, 2014)
- Harvey Korman Harvey Korman Harvey Korman (Spartan Press, 2017) with John Dorsey and Scott Wannberg

=== Editor ===
- Sharktalk (Rose of Sharon Press, 1988) by Doug Knott
- The Electric Yes Indeed! (Shelf Life Press, 1989) by Scott Wannberg
- The Outlaw Bible of American Poetry (Thunders Mouth Press, 1999)
- The Outlaw's Prayer: Teaching The Dead to Sing (Rose of Sharon Press, 2006) by John Dorsey
- Black Ace 8 (Temple of Man, 2007)
- An Interview with Ted Berrigan (Rose of Sharon Press, 2013)
- Natural Geographics (Rose of Sharon Press, 2014) by M. Lane Bruner
- The Official Language of Yes (Perceval Press, 2015) by Scott Wannberg
- The Hideous Bible (Rose of Sharon Press, 2016) by The Lost Bums
- lost bastard chronicles (Rose of Sharon Press, 2017) by mark hartenbach

== Awards ==
- Drama-Logue Award, for Best Actor as Jud in Oklahoma! (1979)
- LA Weekly's Best Performance Poet, (1989)
- Firecracker Alternative Book Award, for The Outlaw Bible of American Poetry (2000)
- Beyond Baroque Distinguished Service Award, first recipient (2011)

== Filmography ==
- Battle Beyond the Stars (1980) - Lettress (uncredited)
- Rimbaud in L.A. (1982) - Carjat
- Pale Rider (1985) - Deputy Folke
- In the Mood (1987) - Cpl. Howard Glatt, USMC
- Near Dark (1987) - Police Officer at Motel
- Nightmare at Noon (1988) - Albino's Henchman #1
- Angel III: The Final Chapter (1988) - Roger
- Twins (1988) - Hollywood Biker #1
- Let It Ride (1989) - Trainer
- Cool as Ice (1991) - Morrisey
- Bed of Roses (1996) - Stanley
- Luxor Live (1996) - Osiris
- Vegas Vacation (1997) - Pit Boss
- No More Baths (1998) - Bud Bildmore
- Simon Says (1998) - Ed Simon
- The Independent (2000) - Slate
- Buying the Cow (2002) - Stanley
- World Trade Center (2006) - FDNY Lieutenant (uncredited)
- Cook Off! (2007) - Dave Carriere
- Red Velvet (2008) - Father
- Ashes (2010) - Peter Ehrlich
- The Great Intervention (2010) - Dr. Alan Griffin
- California Scheming (2014) - Mr. Rourke
