= Domingue =

Domingue may refer to:

== People ==
- Gerald Domingue (born 1937), American medical researcher
- Jean Domingue (born 1962), Canadian politician
- Louis Domingue (born 1992), Canadian professional ice hockey player
- Michel Domingue (1813–1877), President of Haiti from 1874 to 1876

== Places ==
- Saint-Domingue, French colony from 1658 to 1804 later named Haiti
