= InterCourses =

Cookbook by Martha Hopkins and Randall Lockridge

InterCourses: An Aphrodisiac Cookbook
- Author: Martha Hopkins; Randall Lockridge; Ben Fink (photography)
- Language: English
- Genre: Cookbook
- Publisher: Terrace Publishing
- Publication date: 1997
- Publication place: United States
- Media type: Print ebook

InterCourses: An Aphrodisiac Cookbook is a 1997 cookbook written by Martha Hopkins and Randall Lockridge with photography by Ben Fink, and published by Terrace Publishing.

It focuses primarily on recipes and foods appropriate for romantic settings and seduction, covering traditionally sexually-associated foods such as chocolate, strawberries, oysters, honey, and avocados, as well as less-traditional foods such as pine nuts, coffee, and chiles. The recipes are illustrated with numerous personal stories interviewed for each edition and extensive, non-explicit erotic photography.

The book was followed by another edition entitled The New InterCourses, which was released in 2007 circa the tenth anniversary of the book.

Both books have received extensive media coverage, including The New York Times, Food Network, CNN, The Splendid Table, Los Angeles Times, and many others. The original edition was given a 1997 Firecracker Alternative Book Award.

In total, InterCourses has sold more than 325,000 copies, as well as foreign rights to England and Australia.
