= Dærick Gröss Sr. =

American artist and illustrator (1947–2023)

- Born: January 28, 1947 Kettering, Ohio, U.S.
- Died: December 8, 2023 (aged 76)
- Area: Artist
- Notable works: The Guide to Getting it On
- Children: Dærick Gröss Jr.

Richard Gröss (January 28, 1947 – December 8, 2023), known professionally as Dærick Gröss Sr., was an American illustrator, writer, editor, and art director. Gröss worked at comic book companies Marvel Comics, DC Comics, Chaos! Comics, Image Comics, and Innovation Publishing, primarily in the 1990s, and afterwards at his own company, Studio G, with his son, Dærick Gröss. He was the visual editor at inDELible Comics, and the art director at ACP Comics.

== Early life and education ==
Gröss was born in the Dayton suburb of Kettering, Ohio, on January 27, 1947, and was a comic book fan from childhood. He later attended Ohio University from 1965 to 1967 studying art and theatre. He was a member of the fraternity, Phi Kappa Theta. Dissatisfied with the art instruction at the university, he went to the Central Academy of Commercial Art in Cincinnati, Ohio in 1969.

== Career ==
=== Early career ===
After graduation, Gröss worked at WCPO-TV in Cincinnati, Ohio as a live set designer and created art for on-camera graphics for 3 years. Gröss joined The Cincinnati Post as a staff artist and cartoonist, eventually becoming the art director as illustrator and page designer.

=== Murciélaga She-Bat ===
Gröss answered a CFW Magazine ad which started his career in comics. In 1988, he created the Latina mutant Murciélaga She-Bat, part of the REIKI team in Robo Warriors. In the early 1990s, two issues of Murciélaga She-Bat were published by Heroic Publishing, and issue #3 by Revolutionary Comics. In 2000, two comics featuring Murciélaga were released as a bilingual flipbook in both Spanish and English. Heroic Publishing later reprinted the original eight issues of the series.

=== Innovation Comics ===
Dærick Gröss painted interior art for 12 issues of an adaptation of the Anne Rice Vampire Lestat Series published by Innovation Comics. He won Comicon's Russ Manning Award for most promising newcomer.

In 1992, Gröss also painted cover art for Forbidden Planet issues #1-4, also published by Innovation.

=== Marvel and DC ===
Gröss pencilled issues #84 and #88 of Excalibur for Marvel Comics in 1995. He pencilled part 7 of the short-lived CyberComics initiative from Marvel featuring Spiderman in 1996. He also penciled a portion of X Force/Cable Annual #1 in 1995, and X-Men: Domino issue #1 in 1997.

At DC Comics, Gröss penciled Batman: Two-Face Strikes Twice issues #1 and #2 in 1993.

=== Other work ===
Gröss made caricatures of celebrities starring in shows for the Kenley Players from the 60s to the 80s, which appeared on the front covers of the programs.

At adult comic book publisher Carnal Comics, Gröss drew several projects in the 90s.

Gröss illustrated The Guide to Getting it On, an educational sexual manual written by psychoanalyst and author Paul Joannides. It was published in 1996 by Goofy Foot Press and won a 1997 Firecracker Alternative Book Award.

As penciler and inker he also worked on Gay Comics issue #24 (1997).

Gröss contributed to the Marvel trading card game OverPower and Game of Thrones cards for Fantasy Flight Games.

His production company Dærick Gröss Studios, was founded in 1989, then renamed Studio G in 1990. His son Dærick Gröss worked with him, and took over the running of Studio G following his death. In 2001, a fire destroyed most of his studio.

Gröss produced T-shirt designs, prints, and other products featuring his work.

Gröss turned to political cartooning in 2019 with the satirical comic Trumpy.

== Personal life and death ==
From 2008 until his death, he lived in Simi Valley, California. He died on December 8, 2023, at the age of 76.

== Awards ==
- 1991 Russ Manning Most Promising Newcomer Award
- 1997 (with author Paul Joannides) Firecracker Alternative Book Award for Sex for The Guide to Getting it On

== Bibliography ==
=== Contributions ===
==== Innovation Comics ====
- Anne Rice's The Vampire Lestat issues #1-12 (1990–91)
- Anne Rice's Interview With the Vampire issue #2 (1991)
- Anne Rice's Queen of the Damned issue #2 (1991)
- The Vampire Companion issues #1-2 (1991)
- Forbidden Planet issues #1-4 (1992)
- Forbidden Planet: The Saga of the Krell issue #1 (1993)
- Hero Alliance issue #17 (1991)
- The Colour of Magic issues #1-4 (1991)
- The Shadow of the Torturer issues #2-3 (1991)
- Bozo: The World's Most Famous Clown vol.1 (1992)

==== Heroic Publishing ====
- Murciélaga: She-Bat issues #1, 2, 8-16, 18, 19 (1993, 2010-11, 2014-17, 2020-21)
- Reiki Warriors Special issue #1 (2013)
- Tigress issue #3 (1992)
- Lady Arcane issues #1-2 (1992)
- League of Champions issue #9 (1990)
- Champions Classics issue #4 (1992)
- The Adventures of Chrissie Claus issue #3 (1991)
- Sparkplug issue #1 (1993)
- Flare vol. 2 issue #11 (1993), vol. 3 issues #1, 5, 30, 34 (2004–06)
- Flare Adventures issues #3, 6 (1992–93)
- Flare: The New Adventures vol. 6 issue #1 (2006)
- Liberty Girl issue #0 (2006)
- Liberty Girl: The Return trade paperback (2007)
- Tales Of The Champions issue #3 (2006)
- WitchGirls Inc. issue #10 (2011)
- The Infinites issue #1 (2011)

==== Image Comics ====
- Bloodwulf issues #1-4 (1995)

==== Marvel Comics ====
- Excalibur issue #84 #88 (1994–95)
- Excalibur Annual issue #2 (1994)
- Excalibur Visionaries: Warren Ellis issue #1 (2010)
- Midnight Sons issue #7 (1994)
- Captain Marvel issue #5 (1996)
- Cable issue #10 (1996)
- X-Force / Cable '95 issue #5 (1995)
- Cosmic Powers Unlimited issue #3 (1995)
- X-Men: Domino issue #1 (2018)
- Cable & X-Force: Onslaught Rising (2018)

==== Malibu Comics ====
- Neuroscope issues #1-5 (1992–93)
- Solution issue #16 (1995)

==== Chaos! Comics ====
- Evil Ernie: The Resurrection issue #1 (1994)
- Purgatori issue #1 (1998)
- Purgatori vs. Vampirella issue #1 (2000)
- Lady Death: Last Rites issue #2 (2001)
- Lady Death: Retribution issue #1 (1998)
- Lady Death vs. Vampirella II issue #1 (2000)
- Lady Death/Bedlam issue #1 (2002)
- Jade: Redemption issue #2 (2002)
- The Undead issue #1 (2002)

==== DC Comics ====
- Batman: Two-Face Strikes Twice issues #1.2 #2.2 (1993)

==== AK Comics ====
- Shred Comics issues #1-2 #8 (1989)
- Jalia issues #1-3 (2006)

==== Sicilian Dragon Publishing ====
- Anne Rice's Tale of the Body Thief issues #1-4 (1999)

==== Revolutionary Publishing ====
- Heavy Metal Monsters issues #1-3 (1992–93)

==== CFW Enterprises ====
- Tales of the Kung-Fu Warriors issue #12 (1989)
- Robo Warriors issues #2 #4-8 (1988)

==== Carnal Comics ====
- Rebecca Bardoux issue #1 (1994)
- Brittany O'Connell issue #1 (1996)
- Porn Star Fantasies issue #6 (1996)
- Sahara Sands issue #1 (1997)
- Women of Porn: A Cartoon History issue #1 (1999)

==== Kitchen Sink Press ====
- Gay Comix issue #24 (1996)

==== Sky Comics ====
- Blood & Roses: Search for the Time Stone issue #1 (1994)

==== Bishop Press ====
- Rose 'n' Gunn issue #2-3 (1995)

==== Knight Press ====
- Blood & Roses Adventures issue #1 (1995)

==== Marz Publishing ====
- Jinn Warriors issue #1 (2012)

==== inDELLible Comics ====
- InDELLiprose issue #1 (2018)
