= Julia Vinograd =

American poet

- Born: December 11, 1943 Berkeley, California, U.S.
- Died: December 5, 2018 (aged 74) Oakland, California, U.S.
- Occupation: Poet
- Education: University of California at Berkeley, B.A. (1965); Iowa Writers' Workshop, MFA
- Notable awards: Pushcart Prize; American Book Award

Julia Shalett Vinograd (December 11, 1943 – December 5, 2018) was a poet. She was well known as "The Bubble Lady" to the Telegraph Avenue community of Berkeley, California, a moniker she gained from blowing bubbles at the People's Park demonstrations in 1969. Vinograd is depicted blowing bubbles in the People's Park Mural off of Telegraph Avenue in Berkeley.

== Education ==
Vinograd was born in Berkeley, California, the daughter of Sherna Shalett and her husband, chemist Jerome Vinograd. Her family, including younger sister Deborah, relocated to Southern California when her father joined the faculty of the California Institute of Technology. Vinograd graduated with a B.A. from the University of California at Berkeley in 1965, and went to Iowa, graduating with a Master of Fine Arts from the Iowa Writers Workshop at the University of Iowa.

== Poetry ==
Vinograd became part of the "street culture" of Berkeley beginning in the 1960s and was often called a "street poet". She was also an active participant in the influential poetry slam scene at Cafe Babar in the Mission District from the mid-1980s through the 1990s, where she yelled "Staaaaaarting!" at the beginning of each night of poetry.

She published numerous books of poetry and her work has been included in a number of anthologies, including Berkeley! A Literary Tribute. She also edited the anthology New American Underground Poetry, Vol 1: The Babarians of San Francisco alongside David Lerner and Alan Allen. She was profiled in Contemporary Authors.

== Honors and awards ==
Vinograd was awarded a Pushcart Prize for her poem, "For The Young Men Who Died of AIDS," and in 1985 won an American Book Award from the Before Columbus Foundation.

The City of Berkeley, California, awarded her a Poetry Lifetime Achievement Award. On June 5, 2004, Berkeley Mayor Tom Bates declared that day to be "Julia Vinograd Day," for representing the spirit of Berkeley: "She gives us a voice when ours vanishes. She gives voice to the homeless, the street performers, the merchant, the coffee drinker, friends and foes alike, and her words, like a sharp knife, cut deep into the truth. She describes us as full of life, and love, and heartache. She makes us honest. We, the eccentric, the lonely, the broken are given a voice." She has been called Berkeley's unofficial "poet laureate".

A feature documentary is in production about Vinograd's life and work: Julia Vinograd: Between Spirit and Stone.

== Bibliography ==
- On the Other Hand by Julia Vinograd (MFA dissertation). University of Iowa. 1967.
- Revolution: and Other Poems by Julia Vinograd; Clifford Burke;. Oyez. 1970.
- The Berkeley Bead Game by Julia Vinograd. Cody's Books. 1971.
- Uniform Opinions: [Poems] by Julia Vinograd. Cody's Books. 1972.
- Street Spices: Poems by Julia Vinograd. Thorp Springs Press. 1973.
- Street Feet: Poems by Julia Vinograd. Thorp Springs Press. 1974.
- The Circus: Poems by Julia Vinograd. Thorp Springs Press. 1974.
- Street Pieces: Poems by Julia Vinograd. Thorp Springs Press. 1975.
- Time and Trouble: Poems by Julia Vinograd. Thorp Springs Press. 1976.
- Berkeley Street Cannibals: New & selected work 1969–1976 by Julia Vinograd. Oyez. 1976. ISBN 0-9606346-1-4.
- As if the Street Could Die [Poems] by Julia Vinograd. Thorp Springs Press. 1977.
- Leftovers: Poems by Julia Vinograd. Thorp Springs Press. 1978.
- Street People's Park by Julia Vinograd. Aldebaran Review. 1979.
- Street Spiels by Julia Vinograd. Earthsign Press.
- Street Tenses: Poems by Julia Vinograd. Aldebaran Review. 1980.
- The Clown Jewels by Julia Vinograd. J. Vinograd. 1981.
- Concrete Meat: Poems by Julia Vinograd; John Oliver Simon. Arc Press. 1981.
- Street Signs: Poems by Julia Vinograd. Arc Press. 1982.
- Street Skins by Julia Vinograd. Arc Press. 1983.
- Cannibal Consciousness: Street Selections 1976–1982 by Julia Vinograd. Cal-Syl Press. 1983.
- Neon Bones by Julia Vinograd. Cal-Syl Press. 1984.
- The Book of Jerusalem by Julia Vinograd. Bench Press. 1984.
- Street Sense by Julia Vinograd. J/S Press. 1984.
- Street Blues by Julia Vinograd. J/S Press. 1985.
- Street Mystery by Julia Vinograd. J/S Press. 1985.
- Darkness by Julia Vinograd. J. Vinograd. 1986.
- Cannibal Crumbs: Street Selections (1982–1986) by Julia Vinograd. Cal-Syl Press. 1986.
- Street Scenes: Poems by Julia Vinograd. J. Vinograd. 1987.
- Holding Up the Wall by Julia Vinograd. Cal-Syl Press. 1987.
- Horn of Empty: Poems by Julia Vinograd; Deborah Vinograd. Zeitgeist Press. 1988.
- Graffiti: Poems by Julia Vinograd. Zeitgeist Press. 1988. ISBN 978-0-929730-00-4.
- Street Samurai: Poems by Julia Vinograd. Zeitgeist Press. 1989. ISBN 978-0-929730-10-3.
- The Underclassified: Poems by Julia Vinograd; Terry Guitar. Zeitgeist Press. 1989.
- Suspicious Characters: Poems by Julia Vinograd. Zeitgeist Press. 1990.
- The Blind Man's Peep Show: Poems by Julia Vinograd; Deborah Vinograd. Zeitgeist Press. 1990.
- Blues for the Berkeley Inn: Poems by Julia Vinograd; Deborah Vinograd. Zeitgeist Press. 1991. ISBN 978-0-929730-33-2.
- Eye Contact is a Confession: Poems by Julia Vinograd; Deborah Vinograd. Zeitgeist Press. 1991.
- Open the Door: A Collection of Poems by Julia Vinograd. Unrequited Press. 1992.
- Against the Wall: Poems by Julia Vinograd; Deborah Vinograd. Zeitgeist Press. 1992.
- Lonely Machines: Poems by Julia Vinograd; Deborah Vinograd. Zeitgeist Press. 1992.
- Paper Television: Poems by Julia Vinograd. Zeitgeist Press. 1993.
- Styrofoam Ghosts: Poems by Julia Vinograd; Deborah Vinograd. Zeitgeist Press. 1993. ISBN 978-0-929730-48-6.
- False Teeth Talking: Poems by Julia Vinograd; Deborah Vinograd. Zeitgeist Press. 1994.
- Blood Red Blues: Poems by Julia Vinograd; Deborah Vinograd. Zeitgeist Press. 1994.
- A Door with Wings: Poems by Julia Vinograd. Zeitgeist Press. 1995.
- The Eyes Have It: Poems by Julia Vinograd; Deborah Vinograd. Zeitgeist Press. 1995.
- Speed of Dark: Poems by Julia Vinograd; Deborah Vinograd. Zeitgeist Press. 1996.
- Cannibal Carnival: Poems (1986–1996) by Julia Vinograd. Zeitgeist Press. 1996.
- Dead People Laughing: Poems by Julia Vinograd; Deborah Vinograd. Zeitgeist Press. 1997.
- The Cutting Edge: Poems by Julia Vinograd; Deborah Vinograd. Zeitgeist Press. 1998.
- Ask a Mask: Poems by Julia Vinograd. Zeitgeist Press. 1999.
- Blues for All of Us: Poems by Julia Vinograd; Chris Trian. Zeitgeist Press. 2000.
- Beside Myself: Poems by Julia Vinograd; Chris Trian. Zeitgeist Press. 2001.
- Step into my Parlor: Poems by Julia Vinograd; Christ Trian. Zeitgeist Press. 2002.
- Skull and Crosswords by Julia Vinograd. Zeitgeist Press. 2005. ISBN 978-0-929730-69-1.
- Face to Face: Poems by Julia Vinograd; Christ Trian. Zeitgeist Press. 2005.
- Cannibal Casserole: New and Selected Poems by Julia Vinograd; Christ Trian. Zeitgeist Press. 2006. ISBN 978-0-929730-78-3.
- When God Gets Drunk: And Other Poems by Julia Vinograd; Chris Trian. Zeitgeist Press. 2007. ISBN 978-0-929730-84-4.
- America is Hiding Under My Bed by Julia Vinograd; Chris Trian. Zeitgeist Press. 2008.
- Panic by Julia Vinograd; Christ Trian. Zeitgeist Press. 2009. ISBN 978-0-929730-89-9.
- When Even the Sky Hurts by Julia Vinograd; Chris Trian. Zeitgeist Press. 2010.
- David Lerner; Julia Vinograd; Alan Allen, eds. (2010). New American Underground Poetry, Volume 1, The Barbarians of San Francisco - Poets From Hells. Victoria, BC, Canada: Trafford Publishing. ISBN 9781412052702.
- Falling Sky by Julia Vinograd; Chris Trian. Zeitgeist Press. 2011. ISBN 978-0-929730-93-6.
- Buttering the Wind by Julia Vinograd; Chris Trian. Zeitgeist Press. 2012. ISBN 978-0-929730-98-1.
- Night by Julia Vinograd; Chris Trian. Zeitgeist Press. 2013. ISBN 978-1-940572-01-7.
- Cannibal Café: New & Selected Works 2006-2014 by Julia Vinograd. Zeitgeist Press. 2014. ISBN 978-1-940572-01-7.
- Handle with Care by Julia Vinograd; Chris Trian. Zeitgeist Press. 2015. ISBN 978-1-940572-05-5.
- Look Out by Julia Vinograd; Chris Trian. Zeitgeist Press. 2016. ISBN 978-1-940572-07-9.
- Detours by Julia Vinograd; Chris Trian. Zeitgeist Press. 2018. ISBN 978-1-940572-13-0.
- Between The Cracks by Julia Vinograd; Debbie Vinograd. Zeitgeist Press. 2018. ISBN 978-1-940572-20-8.
- A Symphony for Broken Instruments: Selected and Unpublished Poems by Julia Vinograd. Zeitgeist Press. 2019. ISBN 978-1940572291.

=== Recordings ===
- Eye of the Hand: Selected Poetry by Julia Vinograd (audiobook on cassette). Michael Scott Studios. 1996.
- Bubbles & Bones (Audiobook on Cassette). Michael Scott Studios. 1999.

=== Anthologies ===
- Occident: The Literary Magazine of the University of California at Berkeley. Associated Students of the University of California. Spring 1963. ASIN B008NICNMO.
- Occident: The Literary Magazine of the University of California at Berkeley. Associated Students of the University of California. Fall 1965. ASIN B002A6I4IW.
- Occident:The Literary Magazine of the University of California at Berkeley. III. Associated Students of the University of California. 1969. ASIN B01ED1HLJY.
- Paul Foreman, ed. (1972). Hyperion, A Poetry Journal: Number 8. III (1). Thorp Springs Press. ASIN B009HUTN34.
- Panjandrum: An Anthology of Poetry. V. San Francisco: Panjandrum Press. 1977. ASIN B00XWVSDBM.
- Shirim, A Jewish Poetry Journal. III (11). Los Angeles: SHRIM Intermedia. 1984. ASIN B008E8PMIU.
- Reed, Ishmael; Young, Al, eds. (1984). Quilt. Vol. 4. Quilt. ISBN 978-0931676086.
- Danielle La France, ed. (1997). Berkeley! A Literary Tribute. Berkeley: Heyday Books. p. 240. ISBN 978-0930588946.
- Isaacson, Allen; Hastings, Eleanor; Queveda, Daniel, eds. (2011). Meet Your Monster: A Journal of Writing & Art By Notable Writers and 16 Young People. Zeitgeist Press. p. 92. ISBN 978-0929730950.
