= Dominique =

Dominique may refer to:

- Dominique (name), a given name and surname
- Dominique chicken, a chicken breed
- "Dominique" (song), a 1963 French song by Sœur Sourire, also known as the Singing Nun
- Dominique (1979 film), a British film directed by Michael Anderson
- Dominique (1950 film), a French comedy film directed by Yvan Noé
- Dominique (album), by Neøv, 2015
- Dominique, an unreleased album by Lil Baby
- "Dominique", a season 3 episode of American TV series Reacher

== See also ==
- Dominic (disambiguation)
- Dominica, an island nation in the Caribbean Sea
- 'Nique (disambiguation)
