= Minimum Wage (comics) =

Comics by Bob Fingerman

- The cover of Maximum Minimum Wage, by Bob Fingerman.

Publication information
- Publisher: Fantagraphics; Image Comics
- Format: Ongoing
- Publication date: Minimum Wage vol. 1: July 1995; Minimum Wage vol. 2: Oct. 1995–Jan. 1999; Minimum Wage vol. 3: Jan.–June 2014; Minimum Wage: So Many Bad Decisions: May–Oct. 2015
- No. of issues: Minimum Wage vol 1: 1 Minimum Wage vol 2: 10; Minimum Wage vol. 3: 6 Minimum Wage: So Many Bad Decisions: 6
- Main character(s): Rob Hoffman, Sylvia Fanucci

Creative team
- Created by: Bob Fingerman
- Written by: Bob Fingerman
- Artist: Bob Fingerman

Collected editions
- Minimum Wage: Book One: ISBN 978-1560971870
- Beg the Question: ISBN 978-1560975021
- Minimum Wage: Book Two: Tales of Hoffman: ISBN 978-1560972860
- Maximum Minimum Wage: ISBN 978-1607066743
- Minimum Wage: Focus on the Strange: ISBN 978-1632150158
- Minimum Wage: So Many Bad Decisions: ISBN 978-1632157379

Minimum Wage is the name of a number of comic book series and original graphic novels by Bob Fingerman. The stories follow the life of Rob Hoffman, a young comics artist in New York City in the mid-1990s.

== Publication history ==
Minimum Wage started with an 84-page original graphic novel published by Fantagraphics in July 1995. Minimum Wage volume 2, the series, was published from Oct. 1995–Jan. 1999 and lasted for ten issues. The series was collected as Minimum Wage Book One (Fantagraphics, 1995) and Minimum Wage Book Two: Tales of Hoffman (Fantagraphics, 1998). The entire series was extensively reworked and collected in 2002 by Fantagraphics as the graphic novel Beg the Question. The whole thing was later collected in 2013 as an oversized hardcover by Image Comics, Maximum Minimum Wage. This edition included a lot of new extra material, including the script for the unreleased eleventh issue of the series.

Following the release of Maximum Minimum Wage, Fingerman began work on a new six-issue series, published by Image, which was collected as a trade paperback titled Focus On The Strange. After this, Fingerman released a second six-issue series through Image, titled Minimum Wage: So Many Bad Decisions, which was collected into a trade paperback of the same name.

In the letters pages of the new Minimum Wage comics, Fingerman confirmed that he would like to continue into a third series, but that this would be dependent on sales.

== Plot ==
The original Minimum Wage series (and the attendant prequels and augmentations) follows the two main characters, Rob Hoffman, a neurotic freelance cartoonist and illustrator, and his girlfriend Sylvia Fanucci, who manages a beauty salon but has higher ambitions. The cast is rounded out with their friends, who include Rob's friends Jack, Max, and Matt; Sylvia's former girlfriend Maddie; Elvis, who publishes a sex-themed alternative newspaper; and other colorful characters. Issues addressed in the first series include the struggles of getting by in New York City on a limited income, the stresses money put on relationships, abortion, and the prospect of "settling down."

The third volume begins three years later in Rob's life, as he has returned home to live in his mother's apartment and is looking for love all over again.

== Reception ==
Critically, Minimum Wage has consistently been a success, and many other comic professionals have confirmed that they are fans of the series.

Minimum Wage book 2: Tales of Hoffman won the 1998 Firecracker Alternative Book Award In 2003, Beg the Question was nominated for both an Ignatz Award and two Eisner Awards.
