= Gerald Domingue =

American medical researcher and academic

- Born: March 2, 1937 (age 89); Lafayette, Louisiana
- Education: University of Louisiana at Lafayette
- Scientific career
- Workplaces: Tulane University; Washington University in St. Louis; Saint Louis University

Gerald J. Domingue (born March 2, 1937) is an American medical researcher (bacteriology, immunology, experimental urology) and academic who served as Professor of Urology, Microbiology and Immunology in the Tulane University School of Medicine and Graduate School for thirty years and also as Director of Research in Urology. He is currently retired and resides in Zürich, Switzerland, where he is engaged in painting and creative writing. At retirement he was honored with the title of Professor Emeritus at Tulane (1967–1997). Prior to Tulane, he was faculty of Saint Louis University School of Medicine); was a lecturer at Washington University School of Dentistry and director of clinical microbiology in St. Louis City Hospital (Snodgrass Laboratory of Pathology and Bacteriology), St. Louis, Missouri.

Over the course of his thirty-nine-year career, Domingue received funding from the National Institutes of Health, Veterans Administration, and a variety of national and international research foundations; served on grant review committees of these agencies as well as consultant to various journal review boards. He also served as clinical microbiology and research consultant to hospital clinical laboratories and to industry. He enjoys international recognition as an authority on the basic biology and medical significance of atypical bacterial organisms and is considered a pioneer and an expert on the role of these unusual bacteria in the persistence and expression of kidney and urological infectious diseases.

Domingue was named a Fellow of the American Academy for Microbiology (1973) and a Fellow of the Infectious Diseases Society of America (1975). In 1995, he received the prestigious Palmes Academiques Medal (Chevalier) from the country of France.

== Education and early work ==
Domingue was born in 1937 in Lafayette, Louisiana. He was educated at Southwestern Louisiana Institute (presently University of Louisiana at Lafayette), receiving the Bachelor of Science degree in three years (bacteriology with minors in chemistry and French); matriculating to graduate school at the University of Southwestern Louisiana (presently University of Louisiana at Lafayette)(graduate courses in bacteriology, atomic physics and advanced qualitative organic chemistry; served as instructor of laboratory courses in bacteriology and immunology in university); Louisiana State University(basic medical sciences) and Tulane University where he earned the doctorate (1964); holds the PhD degree in medical microbiology and immunology; followed by a postdoctoral research fellowship in microbiology/infectious diseases and a residency in clinical microbiology under the mentorship of the late distinguished bacteriologist/immunologist, Erwin Neter at The Children's Hospital of the University at Buffalo.

He first became interested in the role of atypical bacterial forms after noting that a large number of patients with urinary tract infections suffer from continual relapsing illness. Using a direct phase microscope, he examined the urine specimens of several patients with urinary tract infections and found atypical bacteria in his samples.

He began to investigate atypical bacteria (cell wall-defective, L-forms and difficult-to-culture bacteria) striving to better understand their biology and the role they play in causing disease. Over the course of the next 30 years, he was able to explain much of the mystery behind how the bacteria are able to persist in the body, and published a wide array of clinical and experimental studies on the subject.

== L-form bacteria – electron dense bodies ==
Domingue worked with a team that included pre and post-doctoral students and fellows along with faculty colleagues and laboratory assistants. Together they discovered that L-form bacteria are able to form tiny dense bodies within parent cells that already lack cell walls. They noted that the forms, which they called electron dense bodies were so small that they could pass through bacterial filters that normally withheld ordinary bacteria with cell walls.

The electron dense bodies could persist inside tissue culture cells in the laboratory. After applying these data to the human condition, Domingue reasoned that in some patients who suffer from chronic bacterial infections, the disease process could be related to the fact that bacteria are able to differentiate into the resistant electron dense bodies that he observed in tissue cultures.

== Significant papers ==
In 1974, he and his graduate student, Mary Green, along with Paul Heidger, a faculty collaborator, published two landmark companion papers in the journal Infection and Immunity. The papers detail how L-form bacteria inside an experimental human embryonic kidney tissue culture system are able to persist in cells and explains how they are able to revert into the cell wall-containing parent bacterial form. They also proposed a detailed reproductive cycle for L-form bacteria, followed by electron microscopy of the microorganisms.

These papers set the stage for Domingue and his team to delve even further into the role that cryptic atypical bacteria play in causing persistent and recurrent infections. In 1997, he and a colleague, the late Hannah Woody published an invited extensive review article on chronic bacterial infection in Clinical Microbiological Reviews. Among their conclusions was the claim that "difficult to culture and dormant bacteria are involved in the latency of infection and that these persistent bacteria may be pathogenic."

He implicated atypical bacteria in several kidney-related diseases including pyelonephritis, glomerulonephritis, idiopathic hematuria, and interstitial cystitis. He also speculated about their role in other diseases such as rheumatic fever, tuberculosis, syphilis, and rheumatoid arthritis.

In the review Domingue stated, "Clearly, any patient with a history of recurrent infection and persistent disability is sending the signal that the phenomenon (infection with atypical bacteria) could be occurring. The so-called autoimmune diseases in which no organism can be identified by routine testing techniques are particularly suspect." He went on to conclude, "Bacteriologic advances, which include special culture media and stains, electron microscopy and molecular techniques such as PCR (polymerase chain reaction), have revealed an increasing number of previously unidentifiable organisms in a variety of pathological conditions. It is unwise to dismiss the pathogenic capacities of any microbe in a patient with a mysterious disease." Over the course of his thirty-nine-year career Domingue published numerous papers, monographs, and book chapters devoted to atypical bacterial research. He delivered many invited international and national lectures about bacterial persistence and expression of disease and wrote a book on the subject, Cell Wall-Deficient Bacteria: Basic Principles and Clinical Significance.

== Other research ==
Although Domingue's primary research focus was on bacterial L-forms, he also published extensively on the biological significance of the enterobacterial common antigen of gram negative bacteria– its antigenicity, immunogenicity, and vaccine potential against urinary tract infections.

He studied the immunological consequences of a vasectomy, as well as the role of various gram negative pathogens in the host-pathogen interaction in pyelonephritis, and the effects of antibiotics and chemotherapy on urinary tract infections.

He also published microbiological and immunological studies on bacteria that produce chorionic gonadotropin-like hormone and their role in an experimental tumor model.
