= 128 Lit =

New York City-based literary magazine

128 LIT
- 128 LIT's first issue, October 2022
- Editor: Andrew Felsher; Aadhi Avrina Prabala-Joslin; Sean Sam; Ruby Wang
- Categories: Literature, art, politics
- Founder: Andrew Felsher; Yehui Zhao
- Founded: February 2022
- First issue: October 2022
- Country: United States
- Based in: New York City

128 Lit (stylized as 128 LIT) is a literary magazine and multimedia project based in New York City. Founded by Andrew Felsher and Yehui Zhao in February 2022, the publication publishes and showcases poetry, fiction, essays, translation, art, and other diverse forms of media in both print and online forms. In 2023, it won a Firecracker Award from the Community of Literary Magazines and Presses for Magazine / Best Debut.

== History ==
The publication was founded in 2022 by Andrew Felsher, a writer, and Yehui Zhao, a multimedia artist and filmmaker. That year, they designed the publication's website with some of Zhao's risograph art in mind and reached out to editors and writers. The first issue of 128 Lit was published in October 2022, and the publication held several events at Black Spring Books, Wordup Community Bookshop, People's Forum, and others; they also had stands at Indie Lit Fair and Rehearsal Artbook Fair. Initial contributors to the magazine's first issues included Kim Hyesoon, Don Mee Choi, Jackie Wang, Vi Khi Nao, Sarah Ghazal Ali, Chime Lama, María Ospina, Jhani Randhawa, Liza St. James, Monica de la Torre, Mirene Arsanios, Celina Su, and others.

== Name ==
The number 128 was chosen for "its exponential nature: 2 raised to the power of 7." Felsher stated for CLMP that an exponential calculation "recognizes the compounding effects of socioeconomic, emotional, and linguistic conditions" similarly to how the publication intends to interrogate them.
