= Lago di San Domenico =

Lake in Abruzzo, Italy

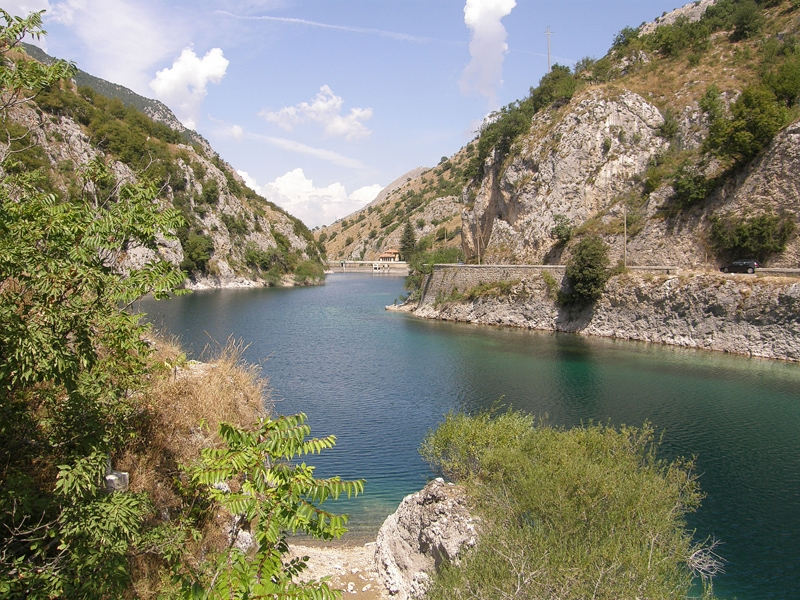
- Lago di San Domenico

- Location within Abruzzo Location within Italy
- Location: Villalago, Province of L'Aquila, Abruzzo
- Coordinates: 41°56′31″N 13°49′44″E
- Primary inflows: Sagittario
- Primary outflows: Sagittario
- Basin countries: Italy
- Surface elevation: 920 m (3,020 ft)

Lago di San Domenico is a lake in the municipality of Villalago in the Province of L'Aquila, Abruzzo, Italy.
