= In the Mood (film) =

1987 film by Phil Alden Robinson

- Theatrical release poster
- Directed by: Phil Alden Robinson
- Screenplay by: Phil Alden Robinson
- Story by: Bob Kosberg; David Simon; Phil Alden Robinson
- Produced by: Gary Adelson; Karen Mack
- Starring: Patrick Dempsey; Talia Balsam; Beverly D'Angelo
- Cinematography: John Lindley
- Edited by: Patrick Kennedy
- Music by: Ralph Burns
- Production companies: Kings Road Entertainment; Lorimar Motion Pictures
- Release date: September 16, 1987
- Running time: 98 minutes
- Country: United States
- Language: English
- Budget: $7 million
- Box office: $999,382

In the Mood (also known as The Woo Woo Kid) is a 1987 American comedy film written and directed by Phil Alden Robinson. The film is based on the true story of Sonny Wisecarver. Set in the 1940s, the feature stars Patrick Dempsey, Beverly D'Angelo, Michael Constantine, Betty Jinnette, Kathleen Freeman, and Peter Hobbs. The film opened on September 16, 1987 in New York City and on September 18, 1987 in Los Angeles, California and Toronto, Canada. When the movie expanded to 361 screens on October 16, 1987, it took in $315,000 in its first three days of wider release.

== Plot ==
Based on a true story and set in 1944, 14-year-old Sonny Wisecarver, nicknamed the Woo Woo Kid, is a teen Lothario who has an affair with his older neighbor, Judy, a 21-year-old mother of two, and then runs off with her to get married.

When the law catches up with the pair in Colorado, they are returned to California. They get a lot of press, as Sonny is considered to be a great romantic. The judge annuls the marriage. She is sentenced to three years' probation, ordered to go to church regularly for "moral training", and repay the county for the cost of transporting them back from Colorado. Sonny is ordered to stay out of town for the summer.

Sonny is sent to live with an aunt in Northern California, and ordered to stay away from his former wife. Originally meant to work for an uncle on his rabbit farm, he quits, finding work in a fish factory. He gets a room in a boarding house, meeting Francine. a 25-year-old wife of a decorated soldier who is overseas. Soon after, they sneak off to Paradise, CA. Before long, an article is published about them. He naïvely goes to the local police, thinking he will throw them off their scent, but instead he gets detained.

His father brings him back home, and soon thereafter Sonny finds himself before the same judge, who rules him incorrigible, and sends him to a youth correctional center until he is 21. Francine was sentenced to three years' probation for contributing to the delinquency of a minor and fined $250.

After being threatened by a fellow inmate, he escapes. Jumping a train to Utah, he is recognised, so gets off in Nevada. Trying to stay all night in the movies Wendy, an usher, tells him he has to leave. Optimistic and also 15, they go out for coffee. He asks her parents' permission and they marry three weeks later.

The public and the media are more fascinated than outraged by Sonny's romantic prowess, with the press nicknaming him the "Compton Casanova," the "Love Bandit" and the "L.A. Lothario." But Life magazine came up with the nickname that stuck: "The Woo Woo Boy, the world's greatest lover."

== Cast ==
- Patrick Dempsey as Sonny Wisecarver
- Talia Balsam as Judy Cusimano
- Beverly D'Angelo as Francine Glatt
- Michael Constantine as Mr. Wisecarver
- Betty Jinnette as Mrs. Wisecarver
- Kathleen Freeman as Mrs. Marver
- Peter Hobbs as The Judge
- Tony Longo as Carlo
- Douglas Rowe as Uncle Clete
- Ernie Lively Chief Kelsey
- Kim Myers as Wendy
- Putter Smith as the Minister
- Terry Camilleri as Mr Browning

== Production and background ==
In 1977, the Los Angeles Times ran a story titled “Whatever happened to Sonny Wisecarver”. Screenwriters Bob Kosberg and David Simon decided to write a screenplay about Wisecarver, who sold them the rights to his story for $500, plus seven percent of what they made selling the screenplay. However, Kosberg and Simons were not able to purchase the screen rights from the two women who were romantically involved with Wisecarver, so their names were changed in the script. The pair convinced Peter Bart, who at the time was head of Lorimar Productions to buy the script, but nothing ever became of it.

Seven years later in 1984, Los Angeles Magazine ran another “Whatever happened to Sonny Wisecarver” story and this time producers Karen Mack and Gary Adelson thought it would make a good movie. Adelson went to his father, Merv Adelson, a co-founder of Lorimar, eventually learning from his father that Lorimar already owned the rights to the story. Adelson and Mack went to Phil Alden Robinson about writing the screenplay, but Robinson said he wasn't interested because he assumed the movie would be a teen comedy. After reading the article in the Los Angeles Magazine, Robinson decided he would write the screenplay. As he was writing the screenplay, Robinson also lobbied to direct the movie as a first-time director. The film's working title at that time was The Woo Woo Boy. Robinson stated that every situation that was portrayed in the film actually happened in Sonny's real life; that nothing was made up for the movie. Transcripts from the court proceedings were used verbatim and quotes from newspapers and magazine were copied directly from articles that were published at the time. The time frame was the only aspect of the movie that was fictionalized, which was condensed from two years to six months and Wisecarver's age was changed to fifteen due to the shorter span of time being depicted.

Principal photography began on August 25, 1986. The film was finished in October and had a $7 million budget. San Pedro and Long Beach, California were the principal locations for the film, with additional scenes filmed in Eagle Rock, Mt. Baldy, Echo Park, San Bernardino, Perris and Fillmore, California. People Magazine reported in 1987 that the real Sonny Wisecarver made about $14,000 selling the rights to his story. He also had a cameo role in the film as a mailman who proclaimed the Sonny character as a pervert. The original VHS from Lorimar Home Video contained an interview with Wisecarver before the film.

== Soundtrack ==
In the Mood Original Soundtrack

Soundtrack album by Various artists
- Released: 1987
- Recorded: March and June, 1987
- Genres: Jazz, Big band
- Length: 40:32
- Label: Atlantic
- Producers: Gary Adelson, Karen Mack

Track listing - A side

1. In the Mood - 3:36 (written by Andy Razaf, Joseph Garland) (Note: additional lyrics by Barry Manilow and Bette Midler) Vocals: Jennifer Holliday
2. Sonny's Theme - 1:42 (written and orchestrated by Ralph Burns)
3. On the Road - 3:23 (written and orchestrated by Ralph Burns)
4. Dream - 3:20 (written by Johnny Mercer)
5. Champagne Music - 2:40 (written and orchestrated by Ralph Burns)
6. High School Shuffle - 2:55 (written and orchestrated by Ralph Burns)
7. The Escape Of The Woo Woo Kid - 1:25 (written and orchestrated by Ralph Burns)

Track listing - B side

1. Baby Blues (Sonny's Theme) - 3:25 (written by Ralph Burns and Phil Alden Robinson) Vocal: Beverly D'Angelo
2. Take the "A" Train - 3:00 (written by Billy Strayhorn)
3. Blues for Francine - 2:41 (written and orchestrated by Ralph Burns)
4. Don't Be That Way - 3:00 (written by Benny Goodman, Edgar Sampson, Mitchell Parish)
5. A Place Called Paradise - 2:40 (written and orchestrated by Ralph Burns)
6. Jack the Wonder Dog - 3:10 (written and orchestrated by Ralph Burns)
7. In the Mood (instrumental) - 3:35 (written by Andy Razaf and Joseph Garland)

== Reception and reviews ==
The Los Angeles Times wrote in their review that Robinson "brought a light, comic touch to Sonny's misadventures, which makes the puritanical punishments handed down to him, and especially to his women, seem all the more absurd". And additionally, "as a period piece, In the Mood is a bit ragged around the edges, lacking the flawless '40s look and feel of the more generously budgeted Swing Shift...In the Mood is fun but it could have been sharper". The New York Times said in their review that "if the events depicted in In the Mood were not in fact based on Sonny's true story, they wouldn't be credible for a second...it reserves its greatest warmth for the era in which the action takes place. And the 1940s are indeed affectionately recreated here, with big-band music, elaborate costumes and well-chosen billboards in the background everywhere".

Film critic Roger Ebert wrote "this kid named Patrick Dempsey is the perfect choice to play Sonny. He's got the wisecracking spirit of one of Neil Simon's autobiographical heroes, but he also has a certain saintly simplicity, a way of not seeing all the things that could go wrong...the movie is comfortably set in its period, the mid-1940s of Roosevelt and rationing, Glenn Miller and Woody Herman, and a national hunger for headlines that were not about the war...the period is established without being allowed to overcome the picture, which finds a gentle offhand way to get its laughs; usually we're laughing, not at punch lines, but at human nature.

Critic Dennis Schwartz wrote "the genial comedy has its funny moments, but overall lacks a knockout punch".

On Rotten Tomatoes, the film has an approval rating of 67% based on reviews from 12 critics. Audiences polled by CinemaScore gave the film an average grade of "B" on an A+ to F scale.

In the Mood opened in theaters on September 16, 1987 with a weekend gross of $45,118 and the film has a domestic total gross of $999,382.
