= The Outlaw Bible of American Poetry =

Anthology of American underground and fringe poets and poetry from the 1950s - 2000s

The Outlaw Bible of American Poetry, edited by Alan Kaufman, is an anthology of American underground poets and fringe poetry from the 1950s to the 2000s. First published in 1999, the collection features work from several notable poets, including Jack Micheline, Patti Smith, Harold Norse, David Trinidad, Tuli Kupferberg, D.A. Levy, Bob Kaufman, Jim Chandler, Jim Brodey, Daniel Higgs, ruth weiss, Jack Kerouac, Bonny Finberg, David Lerner, Richard Brautigan, Allen Ginsberg, Tom Waits, William S. Burroughs, Ken Kesey, Justin Chin, Diane Di Prima, and FrancEyE, among others. S.A. Griffin served as a contributing editor.

Kaufman uses the term "Outlaw poets" in reference to poets whose work is featured in the Outlaw Bible. The definition of the term was characterised as "pretty broad" by Maria Russo in Salon.com, including poets of different ages and backgrounds.

The book was reviewed in Kirkus Reviews, where the reviewer called it an "unwieldy hodgepodge" of texts. John Strausbaugh reviewed it in New York Press, commenting on the large amount of beatnik poetry being published and questioning the need for another anthology, but stated that "there's writing here worth reading, if you can put up with the silly I'm-such-a-rebel attitudinizing that taints the whole project".

The book received the Firecracker Alternative Book Award for Poetry in 2000.
