= Alan Kaufman (writer) =

American writer, memoirist and poet

- Occupations: Writer, memoirist, poet

Alan Kaufman is an American writer, memoirist and poet. He is the author of the memoirs Jew Boy and Drunken Angel, the novel [Matches], and is listed as editor of The Outlaw Bible of American Poetry. He is also listed as co-editor of The Outlaw Bible of American Literature, alongside Barney Rosset and Neil Ortenberg.

== Background ==
Kaufman is the editor of many anthologies, including The Outlaw Bible of American Literature, which was reviewed on the cover of The New York Times Book Review and The New Generation:Fiction For Our Time From America's Writing Programs. The final volume of the Outlaw anthologies trilogy, The Outlaw Bible of American Essays, appeared on bookshelves during the Fall of 2006. He is also the author of a volume of poetry, Who Are We?.

Kaufman has taught in the graduate and undergraduate schools of the Academy of Art University and in writing workshops in San Francisco. His work has appeared in Salon, Los Angeles Times, Partisan Review, Tel Aviv Review, San Francisco Examiner, and the San Francisco Chronicle.

Kaufman himself has been widely anthologized, most recently in "Nothing Makes You Free: Writings From Descendants of Holocaust Survivors (TimeBeing Books)" (WW Norton) and Blood To Remember:American Poets On The Holocaust.

Kaufman is a member of PEN American Center and is listed in the Europa Biographical Reference Series.

== Published works ==
- Drunken Angel (Viva Editions/Cleis Press, hardcover, 2011; paperback, 2013) — memoir
- The Outlaw Bible of American Essays (Thunder's Mouth Press, 2006; now published by Perseus Books) — editor
- Matches (Little, Brown and Company, fall 2005); Constable and Robinson, 2006)
- (with co-editor Barney Rosset) The Outlaw Bible of American Literature (Thunder's Mouth Press, 2004; now published by Perseus Books) — co-editor
- Jew Boy: A Memoir (Fromm International Farrar, Straus and Giroux and Foxrock Books, an imprint of Grove Press publisher and founder Barney Rosset, 2000)
- The Outlaw Bible of American Poetry (Thunder's Mouth Press, 1999; now published by Perseus Books Group) — editor
- The New Generation: Fiction For Our Time From America's Writing Programs (Anchor/Doubleday, 1987)
