= Saint Dominic Academy (Maine) =

Location
- 121 Gracelawn Road; Auburn, Maine 04210; United States
- 44.1274°N 70.2348°W

Information
- Type: College preparatory and elementary school
- Motto: Veritas Vitae (The Truth of Life)
- Religious affiliation: Roman Catholic
- Established: 1941
- Oversight: Roman Catholic Diocese of Portland
- Principal: Dawn Theriault
- Faculty: 29
- Grades: Pre-K–12
- Enrollment: 150 (2021)
- Average class size: 20
- Student to teacher ratio: 10:1
- Colors: Black and white
- Sports: Varsity, Jr. varsity, and Jr. high
- Team name: Saints
- Rivals: Lewiston
- Website: www.stdomsmaine.org

Saint Dominic Academy is a Catholic grammar school and high school located on two sites: in Lewiston, Maine, and Auburn, Maine. Both sites are in the Diocese of Portland. The Lewiston campus is for grades Pre-K to 5 while the Auburn campus is for Grades 6 to 12.

== History ==
Maine's Lewiston-Auburn region is rich with Franco-American history, and families that immigrated to the area for opportunities that the textile mills and shoe shops along the Androscoggin River offered. In 1881 those families united to open the first Catholic schools in the Lewiston-Auburn area. With the growing Franco-American population, more Catholic schools opened until nearly every parish supported its own elementary school.

In 1941, those parishes united to found St. Dominic High School. The first construction undertaken was the St. Dominic Arena. It was reasoned that the profits from the arena would help finance the new St. Dominic High School. The community responded with contributions of land, heavy machinery, and manpower. At the same time, Basilica of Saints Peter and Paul (Lewiston, Maine) Parish began what became known as "La Marche des Dix Sous," a parish collection that went to the St. Dom's Fund. This collection went on for fifteen years under the sponsorship of the Holy Name Society of the parish. This feat was accomplished by the community in order to obtain their Catholic high school.

In the late 1990s, parishioner numbers began dwindling due to many factors that included area out migration. Due to the loss of the two major industries, parish elementary schools began to consolidate. Eleven original parish schools consolidated into four. Then in 2006, in an effort to maximize educational resources, a decision was made to consolidate all of the parish elementary schools which formed Trinity Catholic School.

In the year 2000, Bishop Joseph Gerry made the decision to build a new high school facility in the city of Auburn on 72 acres of land donated by the Schiavi Family. The Libra Foundation was one of the project's many benefactors and in January 2002 the new building opened.

In 2010, the consolidation was completed in the formation of Saint Dominic Academy that merged Trinity Catholic Elementary School and St. Dominic Regional High School.

The elementary campus in Lewiston houses grades pre-school through five and the junior/senior high school campus in Auburn houses grades six through twelve. The total enrollment the combined school stands at 600.

In May 2021, students and parents protested the firing of academy president and high school principal Tim Gallic. The academy cited decreased enrollment and overall financial concerns.

On March 28, 2025 the Portland Diocese announced that St. Dom's would be closing at the end of the school year. Parents of students and other organizers subsequently attempted to form the St. Dominic Regional High School in Lewiston, Maine, but failed to reach enrollment and funding goals in time for the 2026 school year.

== Sports ==
St. Dom's has a rich hockey history. The Dominican pastor Rev. Herve Drouin, O.P., founded the school as an educational institution for adolescent hockey players. Today, several other varsity and junior varsity teams make up the athletic program at the school. Fall sports include: boys and girls cross country running, field hockey, boys and girls golf, boys and girls soccer. Winter sports include: boys and girls basketball, cheerleading, boys and girls indoor track, boys and girls hockey, boys and girls swimming. Spring sports include: baseball, boys and girls lacrosse, boys and girls track, boys and girls tennis, and softball.
