= List of Colombians =

Colombian people of note include:

== Actors ==
- Jorge Enrique Abello (born 1968)
- Carolina Acevedo (born 1979)
- Julián Arango (born 1968)
- Yancey Arias (born 1971)
- Víctor Hugo Cabrera (born 1968)
- Manolo Cardona (born 1977)
- Margalida Castro (born 1943)
- Angie Cepeda (born 1974)
- Lorna Cepeda (born 1970)
- Catalina Denis (born 1985)
- Robinson Díaz (born 1978)
- Ana Lucía Domínguez (born 1983)
- Juan Pablo Espinosa (born 1980)
- Margarita Rosa de Francisco (born 1965)
- Carolina Gaitán (born 1984)
- Danna García (born 1978)
- Isabella Gomez (born 1998)
- Juan Pablo Gamboa (born 1966)
- Paula Garcés (born 1974)
- Aura Cristina Geithner (born 1967)
- Fabián Ríos (born 1980)
- Carla Giraldo (born 1986)
- Amparo Grisales (born 1956)
- Teresa Gutiérrez (1928–2010)
- Zulay Henao (born 1979)
- Vicky Hernández (born 1945)
- Ana María Kamper (born 1964)
- Natasha Klauss (born 1975)
- John Leguizamo (born 1964)
- Andrés Mercado (born 1986)
- Luis Mesa (born 1968)
- Ana María Orozco (born 1973)
- Margarita Ortega (born 1973)
- Juan Pablo Raba (born 1977)
- Paola Rey (born 1979)
- Maritza Rodríguez (born 1975)
- Catalina Sandino Moreno (born 1981)
- Isabella Santo Domingo (born 1967)
- Juan Pablo Shuk (born 1965)
- Catherine Siachoque (born 1970)
- Paola Turbay (born 1970)
- Miguel Varoni (born 1964)
- Sofía Vergara (born 1972)
- Carmen Villalobos (born 1983)
- María Fernanda Yepes (born 1980)

== Architects ==
- Daniel Bermúdez Samper (born 1950)
- Rafael Esguerra (1922–2000)
- Raúl Fajardo Moreno (1929–2012)
- Giancarlo Mazzanti (born 1963)
- Rogelio Salmona (1929–2007)
- Simón Vélez (born 1949)

== Artists ==
- Ricardo Acevedo Bernal (1867–1930), painter
- Débora Arango (1907–2005) painter
- Rodrigo Arenas Betancur (1919–1995), sculptor
- Fernando Botero Angulo (1932–2023), painter and sculptor
- Klaus Fruchtnis, photographer, digital artist and lecturer
- Miguel Gómez (born 1974), photographer
- Pedro Nel Gómez Agudelo (1889–1989), muralist
- Enrique Grau Araújo (1920–2004), painter
- Santiago Martínez Delgado (1906–1954), muralist
- Leo Matiz (1917–1998), photographer
- Fernando Montaño (born 1985), ballet dancer and choreographer
- Édgar Negret Dueñas (1920–2012), sculptor
- Alejandro Obregón Roses (1920–1992), painter
- Mario Opazo (born 1969), video and production artist
- Leobardo Pérez Jiménez (born 1945), painter and sculptor
- Andrés de Santa María Hurtado (1860–1945), painter
- Silvia Tcherassi Solano (born 1965), fashion designer

== Broadcasters ==
- Carlos Cabrera (born 1959)
- Jorge Barón (born 1948)
- Félix de Bedout (born 1964)
- Ilia Calderón (born 1972)
- Silvia Corzo (born 1973)
- Natalia Cruz (born 1976)
- Abel González Chávez (1943–2019)
- Juan Gossaín (born 1949)
- Fernando González Pacheco (1932–2014)
- Alfonso Lizarazo (born 1940)
- María Lucía Fernández (born 1968)
- Patricia Janiot (born 1963)
- Hernán Orjuela (born 1957)
- Claudia Palacios (born 1977)
- Julio Sánchez Cristo (born 1958)
- Manuel Teodoro (born 1963)
- Gloria Valencia (1927–2011)
- Jota Mario Valencia (1956–2019)
- Sonia Velásquez (born 1977)
- Inés María Zabaraín (born 1969)

== Businesspeople ==
- Carlos Ardila Lülle (1930–2021)
- Fuad Ricardo Char Abdala (born 1937)
- Gustavo Adolfo Carvajal Sinisterra (born 1961)
- Carlos Cardona (born 1974)
- Luis Fernando Correa Bahamon (born 1955)
- Carlos Cure (born 1944)
- Alfonso Davila Ortiz (1922–2015)
- James Martin Eder (1838–1921)
- German Efromovich (born 1950)
- Gustavo Gaviria Angel (born 1948)
- Jaime Gilinski Bacal (born 1957)
- Isaac Gilinski Sragowicz (born 1934)
- Luis Fernando Jaramillo Correa (1935–2011)
- Mario Laserna Pinzon (1923–2013)
- Paulo Laserna (born 1953)
- Don Emilio "Pancho" Laserna
- Guillermo Laserna developer
- Isaac Lee Possin (born 1971)
- Astrid Medina (born 1977), coffee producer
- Luis Alberto Moreno (born 1953)
- Guillermo París Sanz de Santamaría (1820–1867)
- Aurelio París Sanz de Santamaría (1829–1899)
- Julio Mario Santo Domingo Braga (1958–2009)
- Alejandro Santo Domingo Dávila (born 1977)
- Julio Mario Santo Domingo Pumarejo (1923–2011)
- Luis Carlos Sarmiento Angulo (born 1933)
- Alexander Torrenegra (born 1978)
- Carlos Ignacio Urrea Arbelaez (born 1966)
- Joaquín Vallejo Arbeláez (1912–2005)
- Eduardo Verano de la Rosa (born 1950)

== Community organizers ==
- Virgelina Chará (born 1955)
- John Henry González Duque (born 1966)

== Criminals ==
- Griselda Blanco Restrepo (1943–2012)
- Daniel Camargo Barbosa (1936–1994)
- Campo Elías Delgado Morales (1934–1986)
- Pablo Escobar Gaviria (1949–1993)
- Luis Alfredo Garavito Cubillos (born 1957)
- Diego León Montoya Sánchez (born 1958)
- Gilberto Rodríguez Orejuela (1939–2022)
- Miguel Rodríguez Orejuela (born 1943)
- Pedro López (serial killer) (born 1948)

== Economists ==
- Salvador Camacho Roldán (1827–1900)
- Mauricio Cárdenas Santa María (born 1962)
- Lauchlin Bernard Currie (1902–1993)
- Alejandro Gaviria Uribe (born 1966)
- Rudolf Hommes Rodríguez (born 1943)
- Adriana Kugler (born 1969)
- Maurice Kugler (born 1967)
- José Antonio Ocampo Gaviria (born 1952)
- Miguel Urrutia Montoya (born 1939)

== Filmmakers ==
- Ciro Guerra (born 1981)
- Simon Brand (born 1970)
- Rodrigo García (born 1959)
- Víctor Gaviria (born 1955)
- Fernando Vallejo Rendón (born 1942)

== Left-wing terrorists ==
- Manuel Marulanda (1930–2008), FARC-EP member
- Vera Grabe Loewenherz (born 1951), former M-19 member
- Camilo Torres Restrepo (1929–1966), ELN member
- Salvatore Mancuso (born 1969), former AUC member

== Historians ==
- Tomás Joaquín de Acosta y Pérez de Guzmán (1800–1852)
- Germán Arciniegas Angueyra (1900–1999)
- Eduardo Lemaitre Román (1914–1994)
- Manuel Uribe Ángel (1822–1904)

== Humorists ==
- Andrés López Forero (born 1971)
- Pedro González (born 1965)
- Jaime Garzón (1960–1999)
- Daniel Samper Ospina (born 1974)

== Journalists ==
- Yamid Amat (born 1941)
- Paul Brito (born 1975)
- Paulo Laserna Phillips (born 1953)
- Fidel Cano Gutiérrez (1854–1919)
- Luis Villar Borda (1929–2008)

== Lawyers ==
- Eduardo Varela Pezzano (born 1984)

== Military personnel ==
- Custodio García Rovira (1780–1816)
- José Hilario López Valdés (1798–1869)
- José María Melo y Ortiz (1800–1860)
- Mario Montoya Uribe (born 1949)
- Tomás Cipriano de Mosquera y Arboleda (1798–1878)
- Antonio Nariño y Álvarez (1765–1824)
- Freddy Padilla de León (born 1948)
- Gabriel París Gordillo (1910–2008)
- Gustavo Rojas Pinilla (1900–1975)
- Francisco de Paula Santander y Omaña (1792–1840)
- Fernando Tapias Stahelin (1943–2015)
- Rafael Uribe Uribe (1859–1914)
- Francisco Javier Vergara y Velasco (1860–1914)

== Models ==
- Manuela Arbeláez (born 1988), model on The Price Is Right
- Andrea Escobar (born 1988), Miss Elite Model Look Colombia 2003
- Paulina Margarita Gálvez Pineda (born 1980), 1999 Miss International
- Laura González (born 1995), Miss Colombia 2017
- Ariadna Gutiérrez (born 1993), Miss Colombia 2014
- Stella Araneta (born 1937), 1960 Miss International
- Lina Marulanda Cuartas (1980–2010)
- Valeria Morales (born 1998), Miss Universe Colombia 2018
- Gabriela Tafur (born 1995), Miss Colombia 2018
- Andrea Tovar (born 1993), Miss Colombia 2016
- Jeymmy Paola Vargas Gómez (born 1983), 2004 Miss International
- Paulina Vega (born 1993), 2014–2015 Miss Universe
- Luz Marina Zuluaga Zuluaga (1938–2015), 1958 Miss Universe

== Musicians ==
- Edmundo Arias (1925–1993)
- Joe Arroyo (1955–2011)
- J Balvin (born 1985)
- Cabas (born 1976)
- Jorge Celedón (born 1968)
- Andrés Cepeda (born 1973)
- Diomedes Díaz (1957–2013)
- Andrea Echeverri (born 1965)
- Rafael Escalona (1926–2009)
- Fonseca (born 1979)
- Karol G (born 1991)
- Pacho Galán (1906–1988)
- Lina Gonzalez-Granados
- Juanes (born 1972)
- Sasha Keable
- Fanny Lú (born 1973)
- Maluma (born 1994)
- Totó la Momposina (born 1948)
- Carolina la O (born 1979)
- Jorge Oñate (1949–2021)
- Rafael Orozco Maestre (1954–1992)
- Shakira (born 1977)
- Soraya (1969–2006)
- Lucía Pulido (born 1962)
- Kali Uchis (born 1993)
- Carlos Vives (born 1961)
- Sebastián Yatra
- Charlie Zaa (born 1974)
- Crudo Means Raw (born 1988)

== Politicians ==
- Miguel Amín Escaf (born 1948)
- Iván Duque Márquez
- Ingrid Betancourt Pulecio (born 1961)
- Piedad Córdoba Ruiz (1955-2024)
- Luis Eduardo Díaz Granados (born 1970)
- Iván Duque Márquez (born 1976)
- Jorge Eliécer Gaitán Ayala (1903–1948)
- Luis Carlos Galán Sarmiento (1943–1989)
- César Gaviria Trujillo (born 1947)
- Antanas Mockus Šivickas (born 1952)
- Mario Laserna Pinzon (1923–2013)
- Rafael Núñez Moledo (1825–1894)
- Mariano Ospina Rodríguez (1851–1885)
- Ernesto Samper Pizano (born 1950)
- Juan Manuel Santos Calderón (born 1951)
- Horacio Serpa Uribe (1943–2020)
- Camilo Torres Tenorio (1766–1816)
- Guillermo Torres Barrera (died 1988)
- Álvaro Uribe Vélez (born 1952)
- Cecilia María Vélez (born 1953)
- Eduardo Valencia Ospina (born 1940)

== Sportspersons ==
=== Baseball ===
- Jorge Alfaro, catcher for the Miami Marlins
- Yhonathan Barrios
- Lou Castro
- Orlando Cabrera
- Jolbert Cabrera
- Dayán Díaz
- Jackie Gutiérrez
- Tayron Guerrero
- Dilson Herrera, second baseman
- José Quintana, MLB pitcher
- Édgar Rentería (born 1975)
- Donovan Solano (born 1987), baseball second baseman for the San Francisco Giants
- Julio Teherán, MLB pitcher

=== Basketball ===
- Braian Angola (born 1994), basketball player for Hapoel Tel Aviv of the Israeli Basketball Premier League

=== Cycling ===
- Egan Bernal (born 1997), cyclist, winner of the 2019 Tour de France
- Luis Herrera (born 1961), cyclist
- Mariana Pajón (born 1991), Olympic cyclist
- Nairo Quintana (born 1990), cyclist
- Rigoberto Urán (born 1987), Olympic cyclist

=== Equestrian ===
- Daniel Bluman (born 1990), Colombian-born Israeli Olympic show jumping rider
- Hugo Gamboa (born 1958), Olympic equestrian
- Caterine Ibargüen (born 1984), Olympic jumper

=== Football ===
- Víctor Aristizábal (born 1971), footballer
- Faustino Asprilla (born 1969), footballer
- Diego Chará, football player
- Yimmi Chará, football player
- Radamel Falcao (born 1986), footballer
- Denis Gomez (born 1991), footballer
- Marlon González (born 1989), footballer
- René Higuita (born 1966), footballer
- Faryd Mondragón, footballer
- Carlos Alberto Palacio (born 1998), footballer
- James Rodríguez (born 1991), footballer
- Carlos Valderrama (born 1961), footballer

=== Other ===
- Yuri Alvear (born 1986), Olympic judoka
- Orlando Duque (born 1974), high diver
- Helmut Bellingrodt (born 1949), Olympic shooter
- Antonio Cervantes (born 1945), boxer
- Alejandro Falla (born 1983), tennis player
- David González (born 1990), skateboarder
- Boris de Greiff (1930–2011), chess player
- Iván Molina (born 1946), tennis player
- Juan Pablo Montoya (born 1975), race car driver, former Formula One driver for Williams-BMW and McLaren-Mercedes
- Óscar Muñoz (born 1993), Olympic taekwondo practitioner
- Jonatan Romero (born 1986), boxer
- Jackeline Rentería (born 1986), Olympic wrestler
- Ximena Restrepo (born 1969), Olympic sprinter
- Diego Salazar (born 1980), Olympic weightlifter
- Mariajo Uribe (born 1990), golfer
- María Isabel Urrutia (born 1965), Olympic weightlifter
- Camilo Villegas (born 1982), LPGA golfer
- Alonso Zapata (born 1958), chess player
- Francisco Henríquez de Zubiría (1869–1933), Olympic tug of war competitor for France, first Colombian to be awarded a medal in the Olympic Games

== Writers ==
- Juan Álvarez (born 1978)
- Porfirio Barba-Jacob (1883–1942)
- Santiago Cepeda (born 1986)
- Rufino José Cuervo Urisarri (1844–1911)
- Germán Espinosa Villareal (1938–2007)
- Gabriel García Márquez (1927–2014) (One Hundred Years of Solitude, Love in the Time of Cholera)
- Marvel Moreno (1939–1995)
- León de Greiff Haeusler (1895–1976)
- Jorge Isaacs Ferrer (1837–1895)
- Álvaro Mutis Jaramillo (1923–2013)
- Mario Laserna Pinzón (1923–2013)
- Rafael Pombo y Rebolledo (1833–1912)
- José Eustasio Rivera Salas (1888–1928)
- José Asunción Silva Gómez (1865–1896)
- José María Vergara y Vergara (1831–1872)
- Jorge Isaacs

== Scientists ==
- Carolina Benedetti, mathematician
- Silvia Blair, parasitologist, biologist
- Pelayo Correa (born 1927), pathologist
- Raúl Cuero Rengifo (born 1948), microbiologist
- Arturo Escobar (born 1952), anthropologist
- Julio Garavito Armero (1865–1920), astronomer
- Salomón Hakim Dow (1922–2011), neurosurgeon
- Rodolfo Llinás Riascos (born 1934), neuroscientist
- Adriana Ocampo Uria (born 1955), planetary geologist
- Guillermo Owen Salazar (born 1938), mathematician
- Manuel Elkin Patarroyo Murillo (born 1946), immunologist
- Eduardo Posada Flórez (born 1942), physicist
- José Manuel Restrepo Vélez (1781–1863), botanist
- Ana María Rey Ayala (born 1977), theoretical physicist
- Jorge Reynolds Pombo (born 1936), electrical engineer
- José Jerónimo Triana Silva (1826–1890), botanist

== See also ==
- Colombian diaspora
- Colombian Americans
- Colombian Canadians
- Colombians in Uruguay
- Afro-Colombians
- White Colombians
