= Time poverty =

Lack of free time

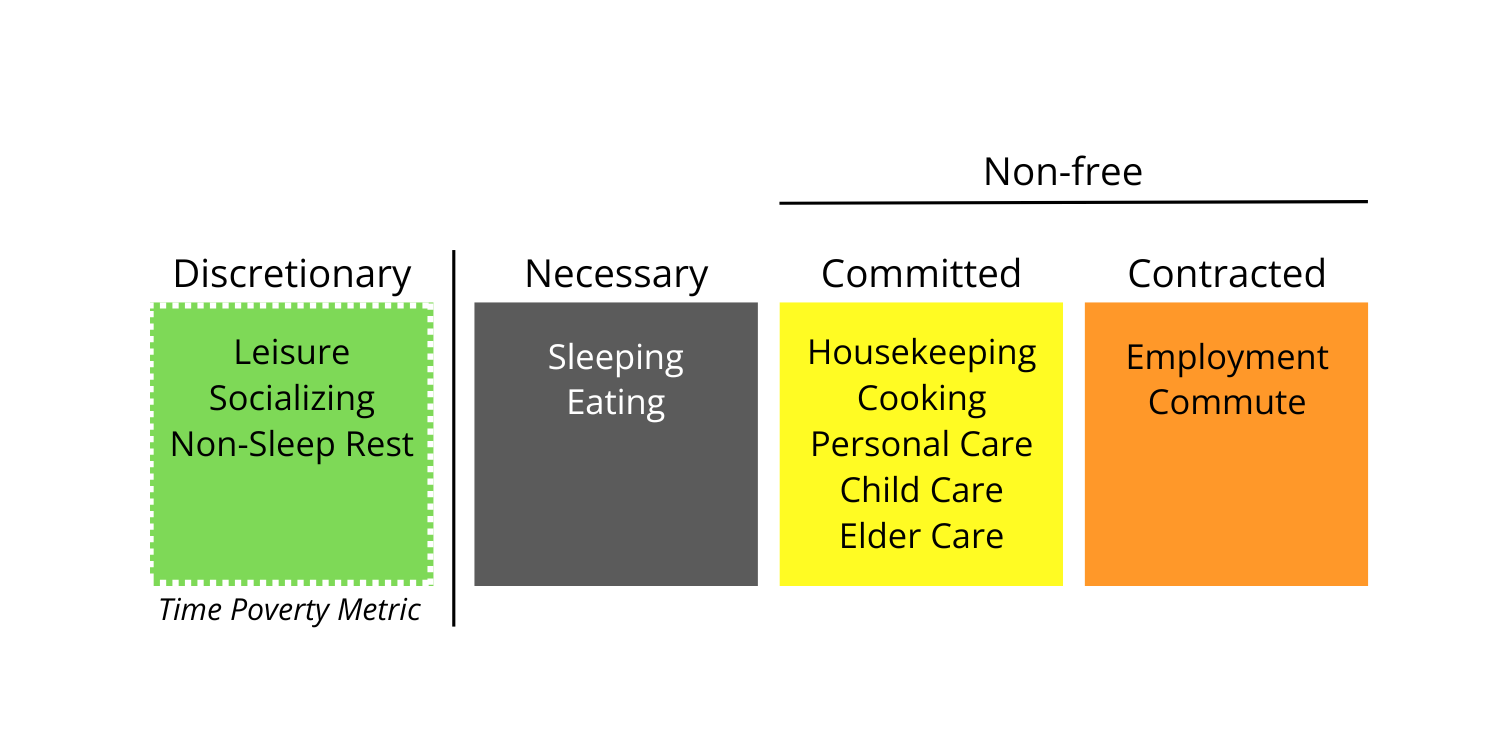
Common categorizations of time in time-use surveys. Time poverty is defined by a lack of discretionary time and can be caused by a number of factors.

Time poverty is the situation of not having enough discretionary time, as opposed to not having enough money or resources as in economic poverty. Time poverty is a result of time inequality, as a lack of autonomy over how to spend one's time fuels a lack of discretionary time. It is complicated by elements like gender and class.

Time-poor individuals often face time-related psychological stress, or time pressure, which has negative health effects. Research on time poverty emphasizes its overlooked status in poverty reduction.

== Definition and measurements ==
Time poverty is often measured as a lack of free or discretionary time due to an imbalance in necessary time (e.g. sleeping, eating), committed time (e.g. domestic labor), and contracted time (e.g. employment). Another layer to contracted time is the combination of three elements: number of hours, what time of day the hours are worked, and how much effort one has to put into the work.

Estimates for daily committed time varies by study and by individual and are sometimes recorded as "non-free minutes" combining committed and contracted time. Measurements do not always factor poor time management into calculations. Necessary time may also vary due to developmental sleep needs.

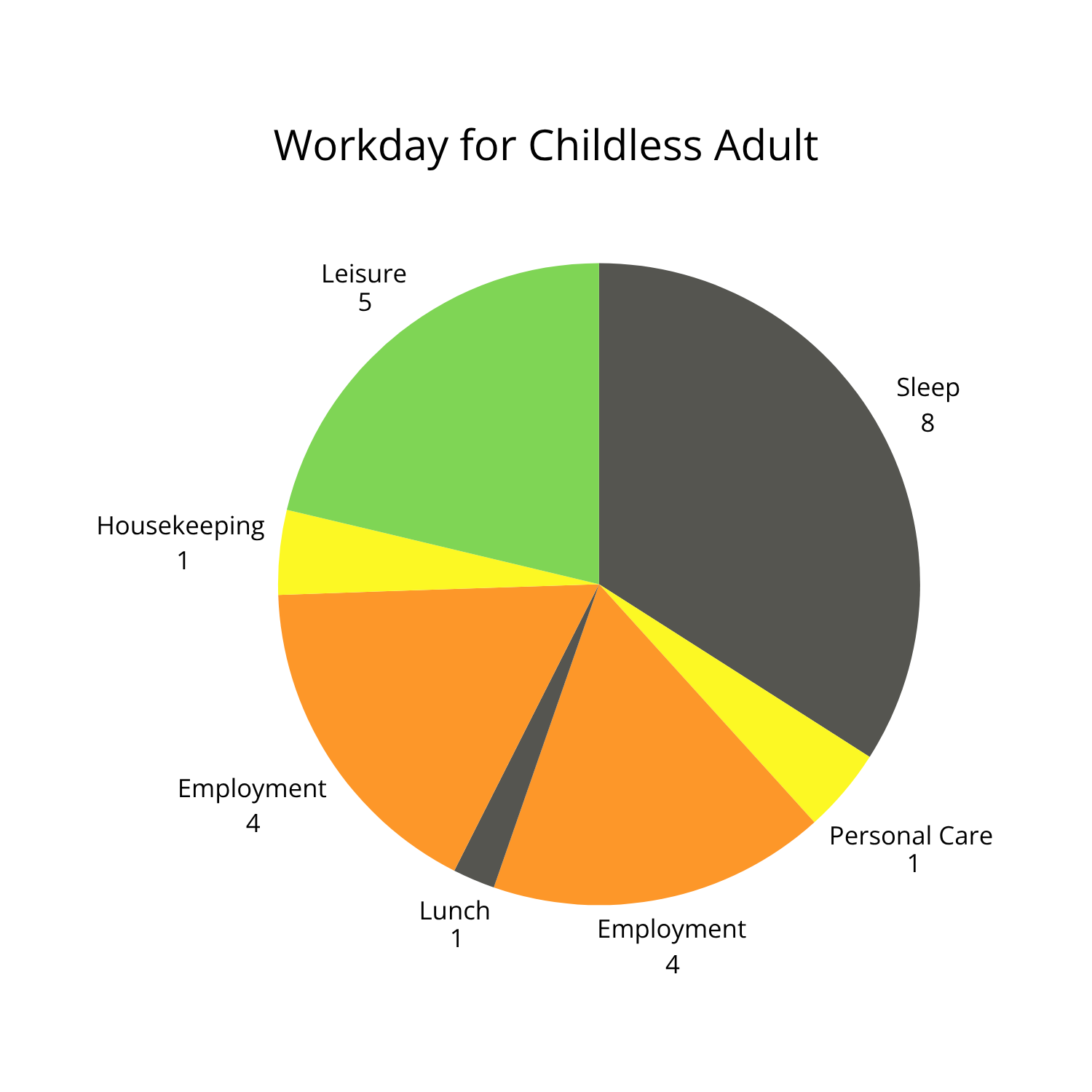
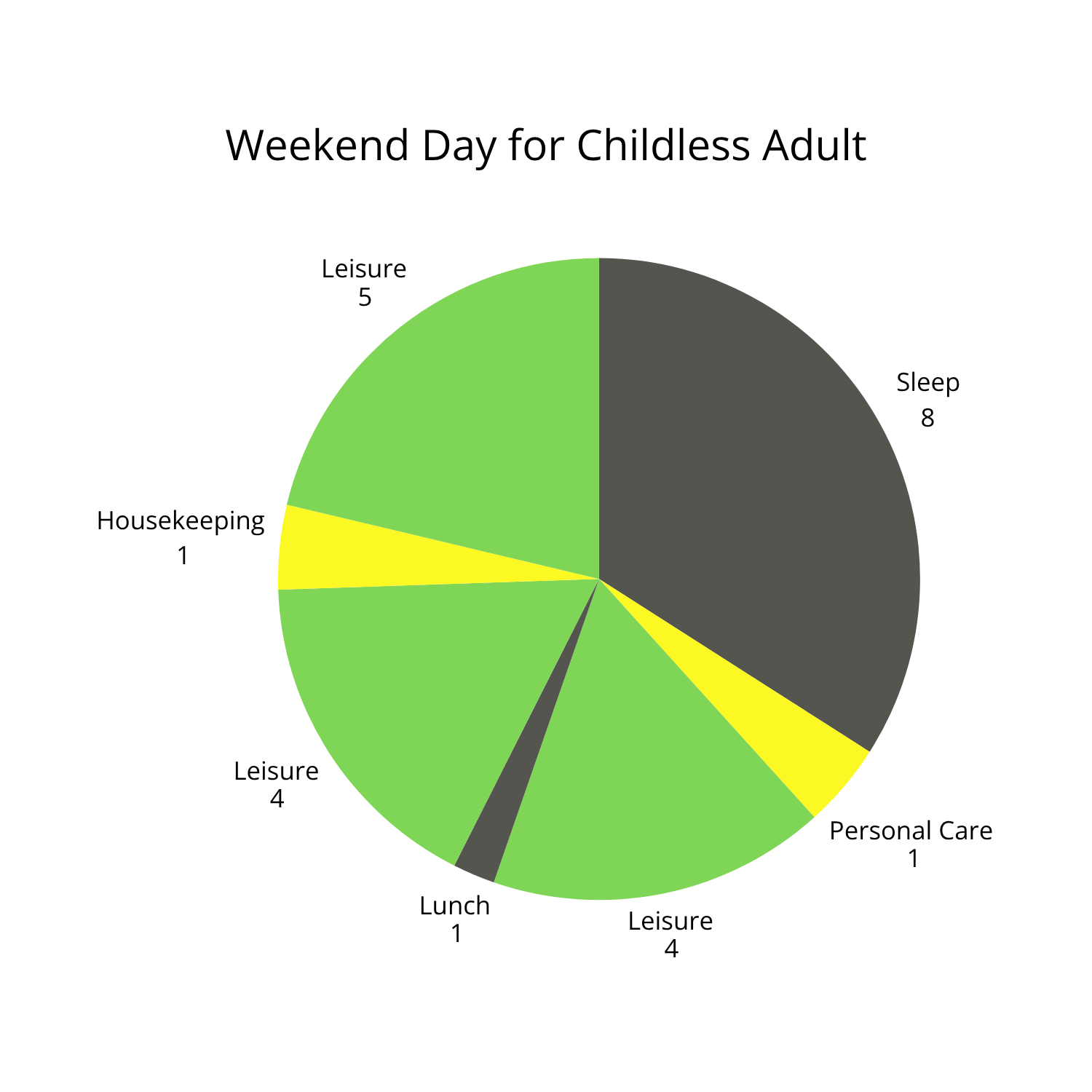
Sample days using time-use categorizations.

Time poverty research varies between absolute and relative poverty measurements, similar to absolute poverty versus relative poverty.

Spinney and Millward use a Time Poverty Threshold (TPT), similar to an economic poverty line, defined as "150% of median contracted time (i.e. paid labour) plus committed time (i.e. domestic labour)." For example, in one paper, the TPT in India was calculated to be 11.25 hours per day.

In a more absolute approach, one study defined time poverty a condition where "any household head who worked for more than 8 [hours] per day" and individuals needed a certain number of hours of rest or recreation to "escape" time poverty.

== Background ==
Time poverty is often referenced in the phrase "money rich, time poor," which describes wealthy people with busy schedules and little leisure time. Some have characterized this as "chosen time poverty," as wealthier people can choose to live near daily activities or hire servants to alleviate time poverty whereas poorer people cannot. Time poverty is sometimes seen as a counter-concept to the phrase "we all have the same 24 hours."

=== Subjectivity ===
Subjective experience of time poverty may not always align with researchers' expectations when analyzing time-use measurements (i.e. not feeling time impoverished despite being objectively time poor).

As a term, "time poverty" may imply free time is positive; however, volunteer work may present social benefits that "just staying at home" does not provide. Eudaimonic and hedonic well-being highly affect subjective feelings of time poverty.

==== Time fragmentation ====
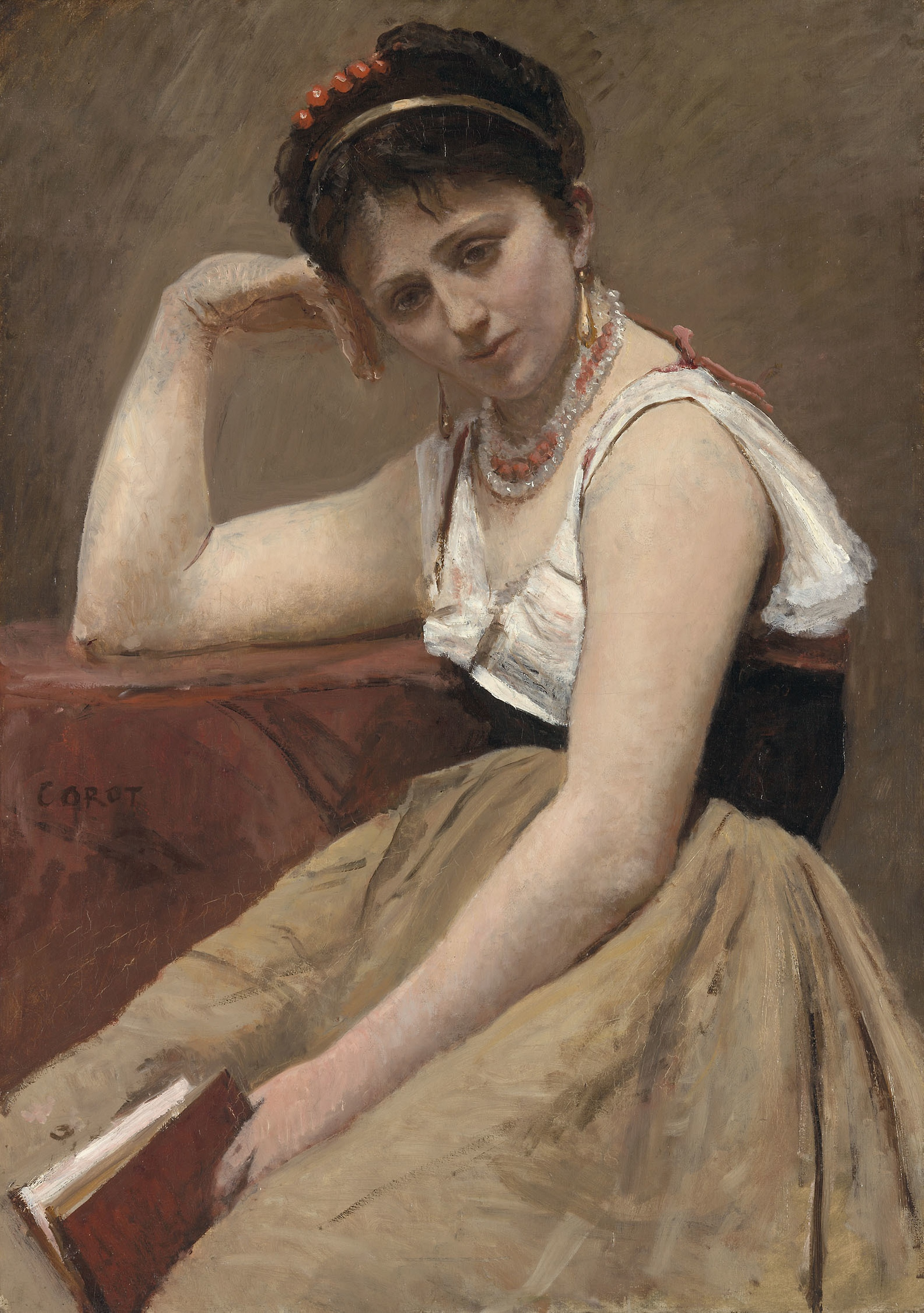
Fragmented time can prevent immersion into an altered perception of time, such as a flow state, and is associated with higher feelings of time poverty.

A 2025 study found that individuals who are frequently interrupted during leisure time feel more time poor than uninterrupted individuals, even if overall leisure time is not affected. Subjective time poverty is more negatively associated with a positive feeling on how one's time is spent than an increase in the objective number of discretionary hours.

Time blocking could prevent distractions such as coworker interruptions or phone scrolling from disrupting time use. Setting moderate goals for tasks like the 1:3:5 rule (one big task, three medium tasks, five small tasks) could manage expectations and help subjective feelings of time poverty.

==== Wasted time ====
People respond more negatively to small losses in money than small losses in time, but the reverse is true for large losses. This could explain time poverty creep.

Some time poverty researchers suggest conducting a daily audit by recording activities and how one feels afterwards to see which "time wasting" activities can be reduced.

=== Time inequality ===
Time inequality refers to lack of autonomy over how to spend one's time. Scholars connect this to other inequalities (e.g. gender, class, etc.) to explore the varying levels of autonomy over time across marginalized groups, as well as any resulting consequences for well-being. Time poverty can be seen as a product or symptom of time inequality, similar to poverty and income inequality.

Economic inequality can also contribute to inequal committed time measurements as higher income households may hire housekeepers, personal chefs, or au pairs to "buy time."

== In development studies ==
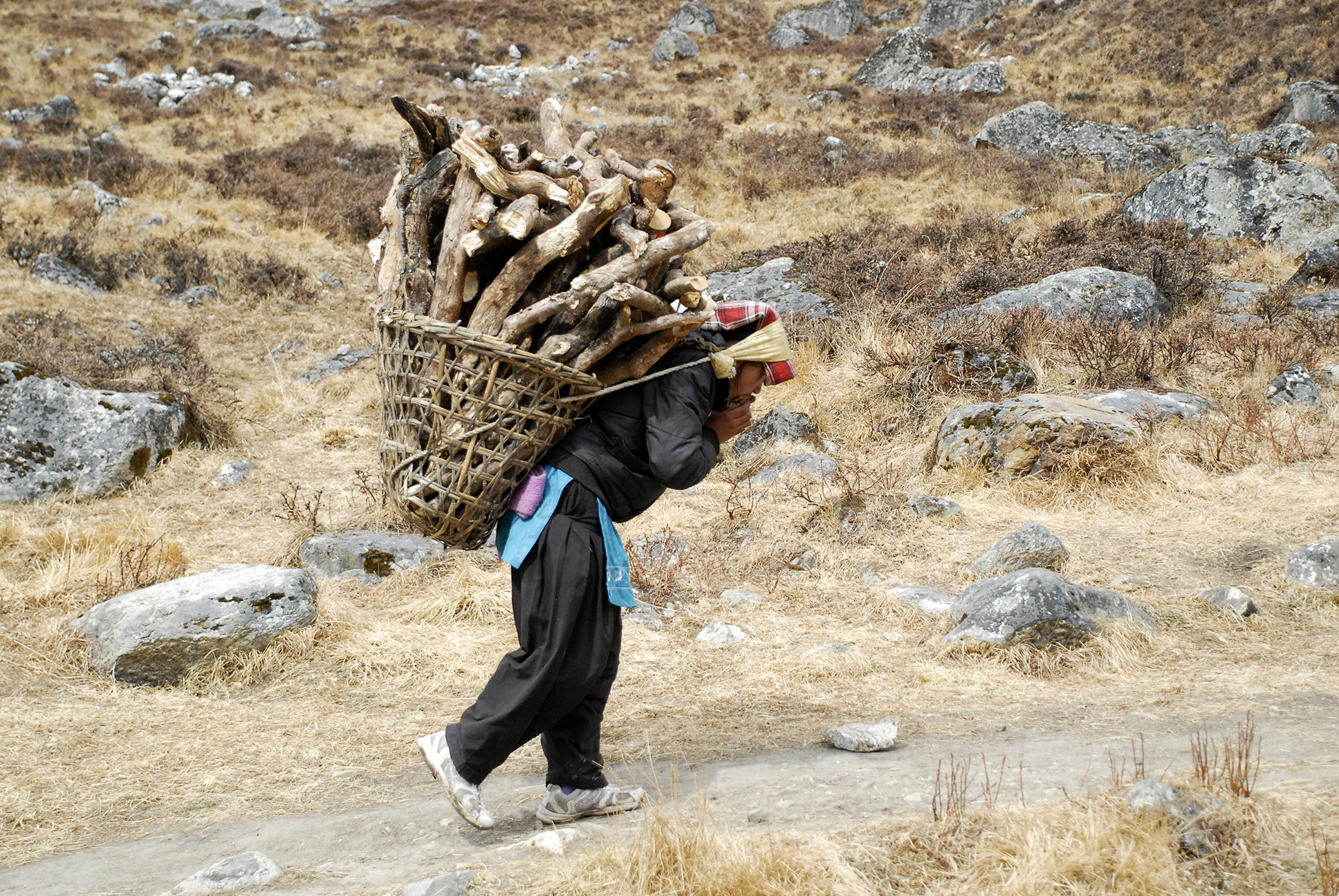
Lack of clean energy and electrification lengthens committed time for women in developing countries.

Time poverty is an important concept in women's empowerment in development studies, particularly when access to resources is limited. A key goal in time poverty reduction is allowing women to have more time to work in non-farm sectors of the economy.

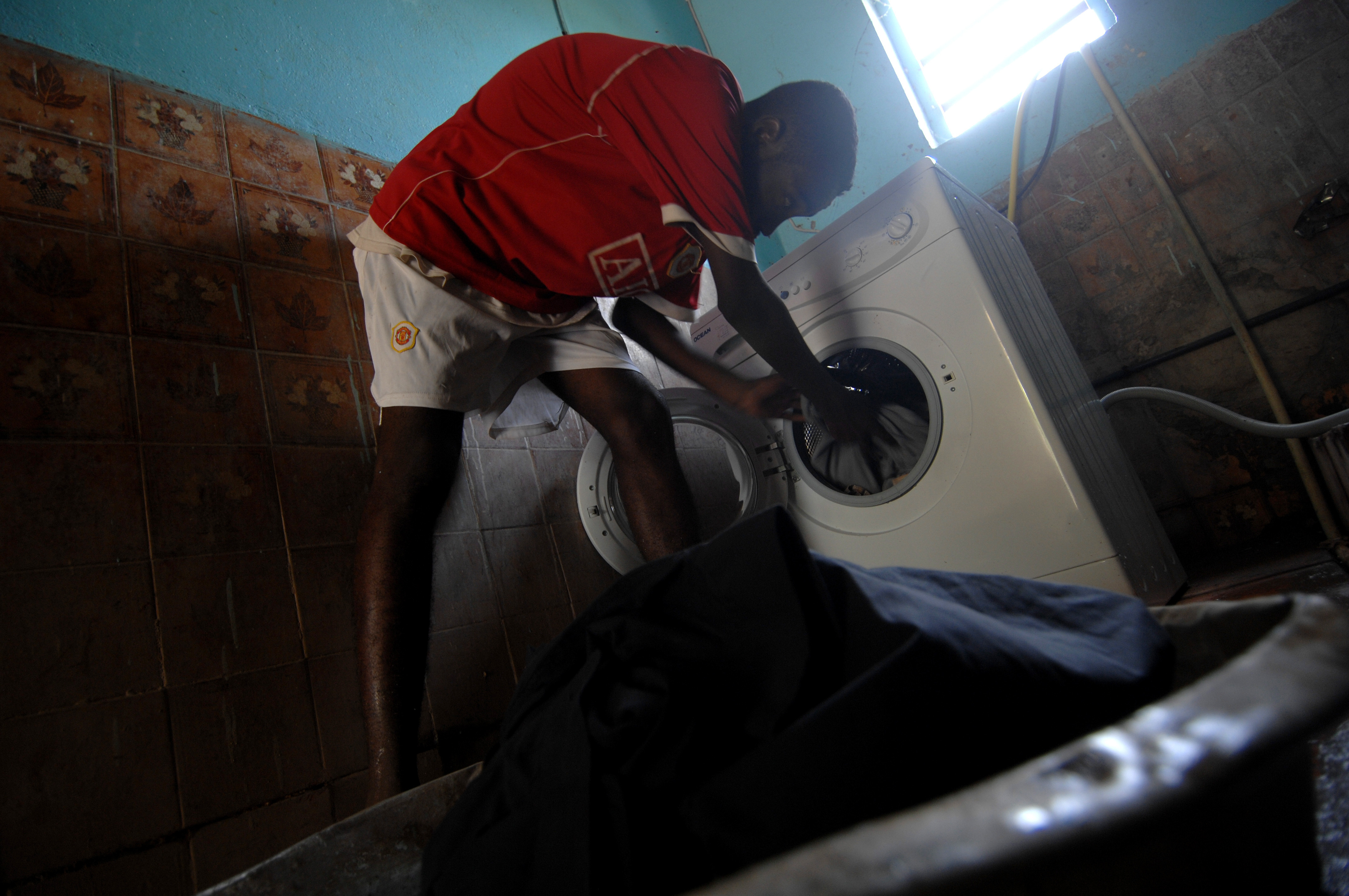
A Djiboutian orphan prepares to hang his clothes to dry after washing them in the new washing machine donated by the Joint Service Community Assistance Volunteers during Combined Joint Task Force deployment.

Lack of access to household appliances worsens time poverty, particularly for women. One study found that lower wattage solar home systems were not sufficient in reducing time poverty, since appliances such as refrigerators and washing machines could not run on them.

=== Agriculture ===
A 2024 study found ecological shocks such as weed invasions increase time poverty by increasing farmers' committed time on the farm and that large farms have a higher increase in time poverty than smaller farms.

Participation in farmers' associations, such as Federación Campesina del Cauca in Colombia, was found to increase time poverty due to transportation and general time demand but had other positive economic and social benefits that were otherwise not available. Farmers' associations often provide more opportunity for women to participate in crop production, but do not reduce externally and internally imposed domestic labor, which remains the main source of time poverty for women. Researchers have labeled participation in associations on top of work and domestic labor as the "triple work burden."

=== Alleviation programs ===
Infrastructure improvements such as roadbuilding, electrification, and better access to water in the Global South has been shown to lower time constraints on women. Reducing energy poverty does not always directly reduce time poverty as women often use saved time to work longer.

Conditional cash transfers may worsen time poverty for women as they often take on the role of fulfilling program requirements. One study found that unconditional cash transfers failed to alleviate time poverty because women did not spend the transfers on time-saving services, such as laundry services or take-out. In several studies, when time-saving benefits were offered in a program, a majority of the time participants opted for a monetary benefit instead, including time-poor parents.

== Causes ==
=== Gender disparities ===
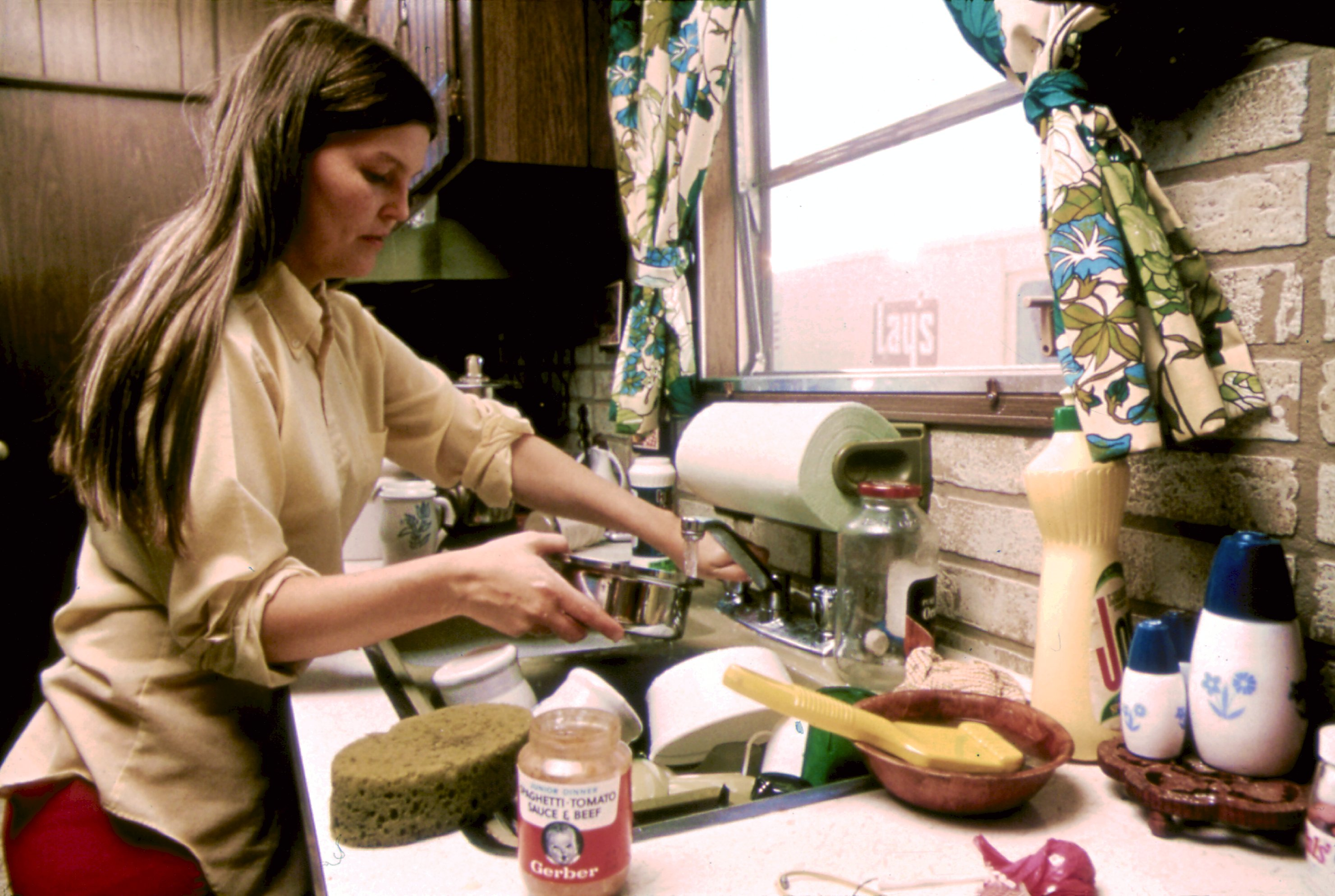
Inequitable division of labor increases committed time and exacerbates gender differences in time poverty.

Women are more likely to be time poor than men. The discrepancy may be due to the existence of a "second shift," coined in 1989 by Arlie Hochschild to describe the double burden many women face in performing the majority of housework, reproductive labor, after returning from work. The time burden from raising children falls disproportionately on women than men.

A 2014 analysis of the American Time Use Surveys found that never-married women have more discretionary time than married women and therefore, have lower time poverty rates. The author suggests this discovery can be explained through the gendered "family devotion schema" (the societal expectation that women should be the primary caregiver) and "work devotion schema" (the assumption that a woman's drive in her career leaves little time for caregiving) from sociologist Mary Blair-Loy. Under this lens, married mothers feel the pressure to reconcile both schema, and marriage adds another family member (spouse) to care for in the "family devotion" realm, exacerbating time poverty.

10–14 year-old girls spend 50% more time doing household chores than their male peers. This imbalance carries into adulthood worldwide.

=== Working hours ===
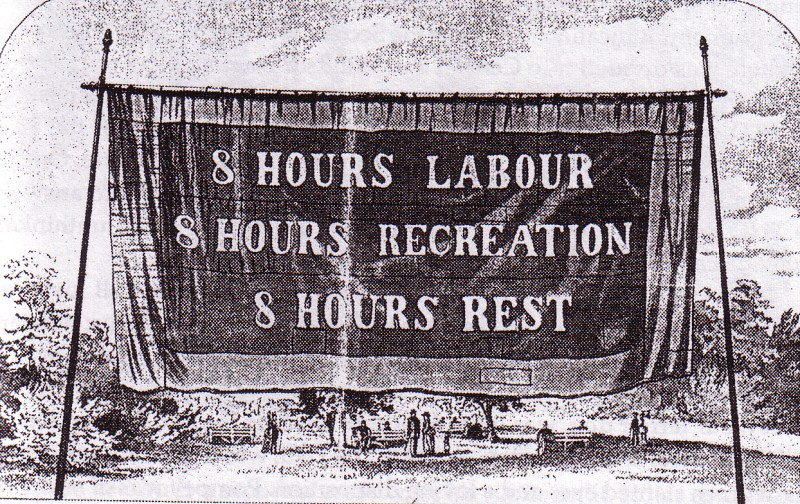
Campaigns for the eight-hour workday often used terms such as "leisure" or "recreation" for discretionary time.

Time poverty can be caused by poor work-life balance and long working hours. Professional expectations to work overtime can exacerbate time pressure. 32-hour workweeks and preventing after-hour work emails could reduce contracted time. Parental leave, paid vacation hours, and paid sick leave are proposed solutions to work-induced time poverty. One researcher suggested power naps during work hours could reduce feelings of time poverty.

Low-income students are more likely to be time-poor than their peers due to need to work to pay for food and housing.

==== Teaching ====
Disruptions in a teacher's workday can have cascading impacts on other teachers' schedules, such as when another teacher needs to take time away from preparing lessons to cover for the first teacher. One study characterized this structure as a time-poverty-creating governance problem, since teachers' schooltime work often spills into afterhours work. The study found that teachers often had over two hours of work to complete after the school day. One study found that disparity in subjective well-being between male and female teachers was not due to differences in time poverty, which there was none, but may be due to female teachers internalizing exhaustion as a failure of social role expectations.

More planning time could reduce time poverty for teachers.

==== Commutes ====
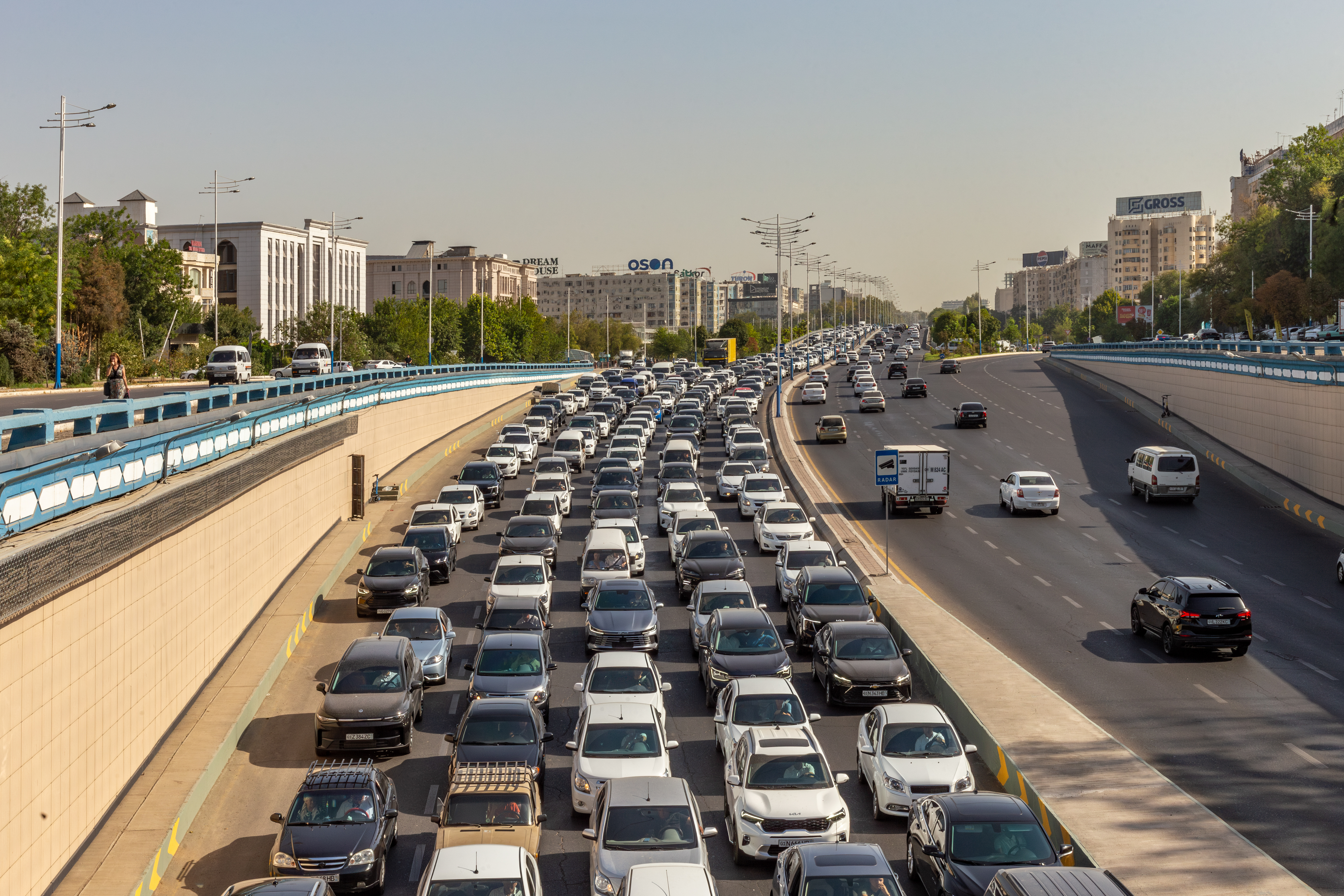
Longer commutes reduce available time for job seeking and social interactions, particularly when cities lack affordable housing near workplaces.

High commute times and traffic also contribute to feelings of time poverty. Low-income workers commute 120 minutes more a week than coworkers who earned more. One study found that transport-related time poverty and general time poverty were not correlated but "co-occur under specific circumstances" among working parents. The study recommended 15-minute cities as one way to potentially reduce transport-related time poverty.

=== Care work ===
According to official United Kingdom government statistics, parents living with children under 15 have 14 fewer hours of free time. Parents are also less likely to finish university than childless students.

Another scholar's analysis found disparities within groups of heterosexual couples based on class, with professional women having more resources to "contract out" care work than women in couples with lower incomes and wealth levels. As a result, women in couples with higher incomes have more discretionary time.

==== Elder care ====
Familial elder care also increases time poverty, as caregivers tend to keep their employment. Although elder care increases time poverty, living with elderly family members who complete chores is negatively associated with time poverty. Caregivers who live with elderly family members have different transportation needs than those who do not. Frequent trips with extended preparation and wind down can exacerbate time stress among family members who do not live with their elders, especially when the trips reduce uninterrupted time.

Increased time poverty is negatively associated with quality of care.

Long-term care insurance may reduce the workload of caregivers and reduce time poverty.

=== Technology ===
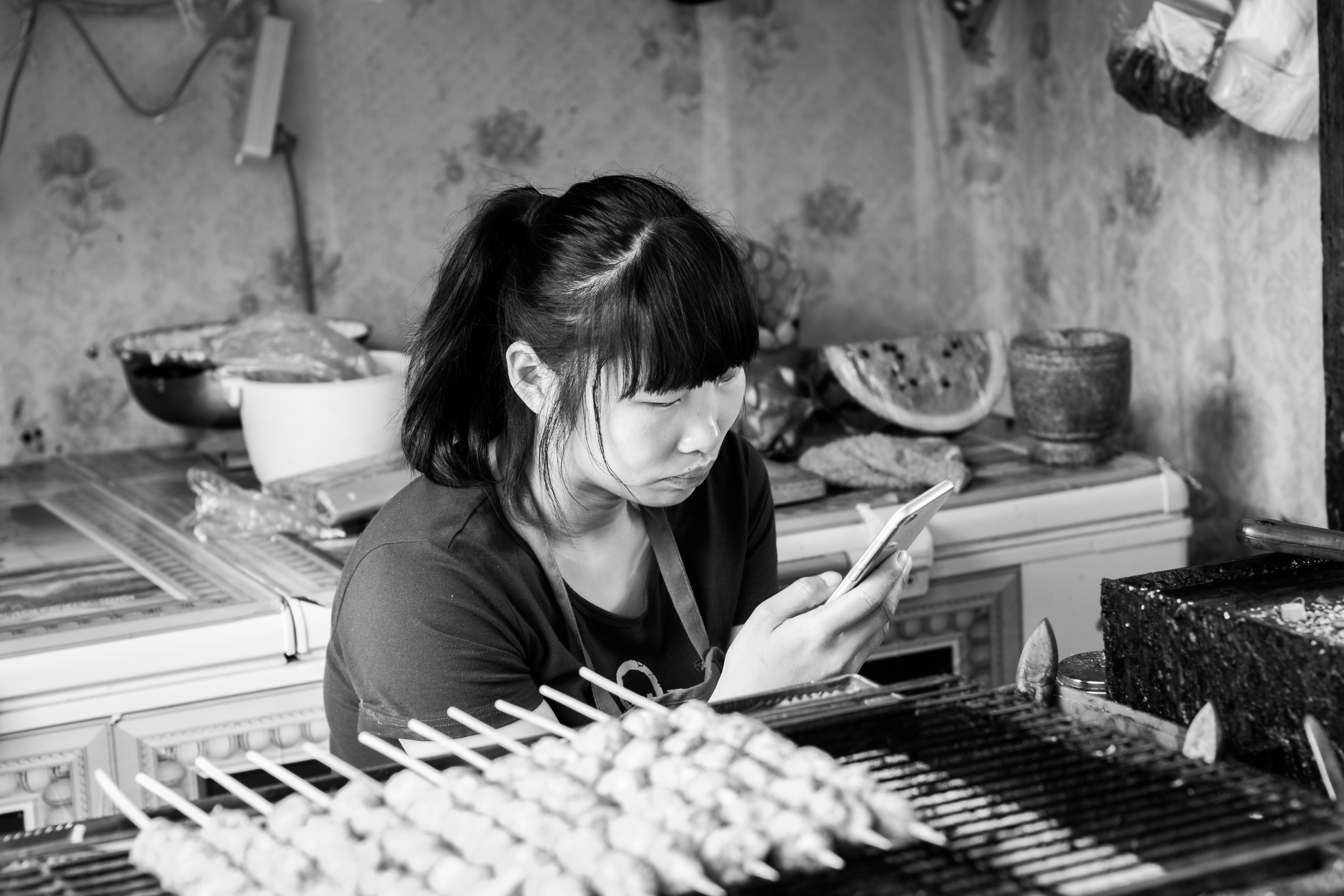
Woman multitasking during food preparation

Digital technology tends to increase feelings of time pressure, particularly in the Global North, possibly by increasing the pace of life. Users often multitask, such as listening to a podcast while washing dishes, even if they had enough time to do both tasks individually.

Workers who are expected to have high phone use for their jobs report that they often get distracted by social media or internet rabbit holes, losing time for their main work tasks.

Teachers, who typically struggle with time poverty already, often have to learn and implement new technologies in the classroom in addition to teaching and grading. AI programs may alleviate some stress on teachers by automating grading assignments.

== Effects ==
=== Health ===
==== Physical ====
A 2013 study found time-poor individuals are at a higher risk for obesity due to a decrease in time spent on physical activity. Employment-related time poverty may increase "food away from home" behavior (fast food, vending machines, etc.). Time poor individuals may not have time to cook healthy meals at home, particularly during lunch.

Another study found 1 in 4 American women delayed health care treatment due to lack of free time.

One study in Ghana found that an increase in time poverty caused by paid work (employment) was linked to decreased food insecurity, whereas an increase in time poverty from unpaid work (housework) was linked to increased food insecurity. The study suggested better access to child care, community kitchens, and water could alleviate time poverty and food insecurity.

==== Mental ====
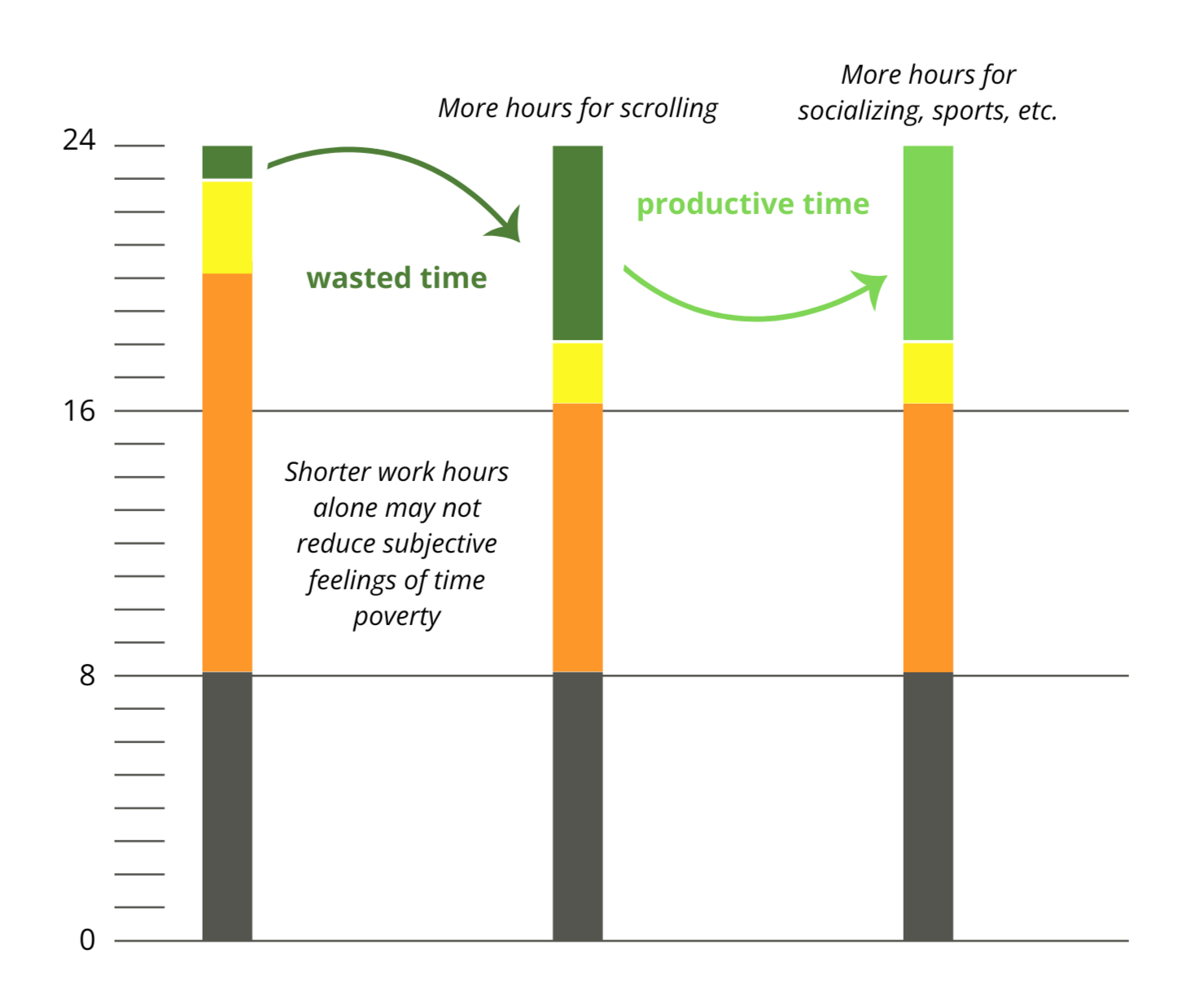
Individuals may still feel time poor with excess free time if they feel it has been wasted. This may be reduced by socializing, working out, or doing hobbies.

Lack of discretionary time may lead to fewer social connections and worsen mental health. Time poor workers may suffer from burnout or presenteeism.

In 2021, the American Psychological Association found that both a lack of free time (time poverty) and an excess of free time can have negative psychological effects, but the specific use of extra discretionary time mattered. Individuals who performed "productive" activities, such as socializing, had lessened negative effects.

Digital technologies can increase time pressure and feelings of guilt in people who use them.

=== Negative student outcomes ===
Students experiencing time poverty have worse academic outcomes than their peers despite working harder. Time-poor students take fewer credits and have lower levels of university retention.

Time poverty may partially explain racial differences in university retention as minority students were more likely to be time poor.

== See also ==
- Time affluence
- Time is money (aphorism)
- Time management
- Time-use research
