= Time allocation =

Time allocation may refer to:

- Time management, the skill of allocating time by a person
- Time-use research, the study of how people spend their time
- A time allocation motion, a type of procedural motion in Canadian Parliament. See Cloture.
