= Fuzzy classification =

Process of grouping elements into fuzzy sets

Fuzzy classification is the process of grouping elements into fuzzy sets whose membership functions are defined by the truth value of a fuzzy propositional function. A fuzzy propositional function is analogous to an expression containing one or more variables, such that when values are assigned to these variables, the expression becomes a fuzzy proposition.

Accordingly, fuzzy classification is the process of grouping individuals having the same characteristics into a fuzzy set. A fuzzy classification corresponds to a membership function $\mu_{\tilde{C}} : \tilde{PF} \times U \to \tilde{T}$ that indicates the degree to which an individual $i\in U$ is a member of the fuzzy class $\tilde{C}$, given its fuzzy classification predicate $\tilde{\Pi}_{\tilde{C}} \in \tilde{PF}$. Here, $\tilde{T}$ is the set of fuzzy truth values, i.e., the unit interval $[0,1]$. The fuzzy classification predicate $\tilde{\Pi} _{\tilde{C}}(i)$ corresponds to the fuzzy restriction "$i$ is a member of $\tilde{C}$".

== Classification ==
Intuitively, a class is a set that is defined by a certain property, and all objects having that property are elements of that class. The process of classification evaluates for a given set of objects whether they fulfill the classification property, and consequentially are a member of the corresponding class. However, this intuitive concept has some logical subtleties that need clarification.

A class logic is a logical system which supports set construction using logical predicates with the class operator $\{\cdot|\cdot\}$. A class

$C = \{ i | \Pi(i) \}$

is defined as a set C of individuals i satisfying a classification predicate Π which is a propositional function. The domain of the class operator { .| .} is the set of variables V and the set of propositional functions PF, and the range is the powerset of this universe P(U) that is, the set of possible subsets:

$\{\cdot|\cdot\} :V\times PF \rightarrow P(U)$

Here is an explanation of the logical elements that constitute this definition:

- An individual is a real object of reference.
- A universe of discourse is the set of all possible individuals considered.
- A variable $V: \rightarrow R$ is a function which maps into a predefined range R without any given function arguments: a zero-place function.
- A propositional function is "an expression containing one or more undetermined constituents, such that, when values are assigned to these constituents, the expression becomes a proposition".

In contrast, classification is the process of grouping individuals having the same characteristics into a set. A classification corresponds to a membership function μ that indicates whether an individual is a member of a class, given its classification predicate Π.

$\mu :PF \times U \rightarrow T$

The membership function maps from the set of propositional functions PF and the universe of discourse U into the set of truth values T. The membership μ of individual i in Class C is defined by the truth value τ of the classification predicate Π.

$\mu C(i):= \tau (\Pi(i))$

In classical logic the truth values are certain. Therefore a classification is crisp, since the truth values are either exactly true or exactly false.

== See also ==
- Fuzzy logic
