= Gustavo Gaviria Angel =

Colombian entrepreneur

- Born: August 12, 1948 (age 77); Bogota, Colombia
- Occupation: Entrepreneur
- Years active: 48
- Known for: Expo 2010, Expo 2016, Ambassador on special Mission, Industrias Aliadas, Coffeecol
- Notable work: Independent panel review of the World Bank Group Department of Institutional Integrity
- Spouse: Margareth Halaby
- Children: Laura Gaviria Halaby, Alejandro Gaviria Halaby

Gustavo Gaviria Angel (born August 12, 1948; Bogota, Colombia) is a Colombian coffee entrepreneur, founder and President of Industrias Aliadas, Coffeecol, Aurora and Chairman of Vision de Valores S.A. He is best known for his contribution as special ambassador of Colombia to the Milan Expo 2010 and the Shanghai Expo 2015.

== Personal life ==
Gaviria studied industrial engineering from the University of Los Andes (Colombia). He holds a postgraduate degree in management from University of La Sabana also known as Inalde.

== Career ==
Gaviria serves as an adviser of the International Finance Corporation.

=== Expo leadership ===
Gaviria served as Ambassador of Colombia in special mission and general commissioner to Expo 2010, known officially as Expo 2010 Shanghai China.

Gaviria was member of Board of Directors of the Sustainable Food Pavilion at Expo 2015, a Universal Exposition hosted by Milan, Italy. In this capacity, he was responsible for introducing Colombia to the 3 million visitors of this event.
