= Mario Laserna Pinzón =

Colombian politician

Mario Alberto Laserna Pinzón

Colombia Ambassador to Austria
- In office 1987–1991
- President: Virgilio Barco Vargas
- Succeeded by: Alfonso Gómez Méndez

9th Colombia Ambassador to France
- In office 1976–1979
- President: Alfonso López Michelsen (1976–1978); Julio César Turbay (1978–1979)

Personal details
- Born: August 21, 1923 Paris, France
- Died: July 16, 2013 (aged 89) Ibague, Colombia
- Party: Conservative
- Other political affiliations: M-19 Democratic Alliance
- Education: Columbia University (BA); Princeton University (MA); Free University of Berlin (DA)
- Occupation: professor, Rector, politician, Diplomat, writer, Businessman and journalist
- Profession: Mathematician, philosopher
- Awards: Order of Boyacá, Rank of the Grand Cross
- Founder, owner: Universidad de los Andes, Mario Laserna Building 60+7+ Buildings
- Net worth: $250M

Mario Alberto Laserna Pinzón (August 21, 1923 – July 16, 2013) was a Colombian educator and politician born in Paris of Colombian parents. Laserna Pinzón is credited for being the founder of the Los Andes University in Bogotá, which was incorporated in 1948 and is a private institution modeled on the United States liberal arts educational system. He also served as Senator of Colombia, and Ambassador to France and Austria and is an author of several books.

== Career ==
=== Education ===
He was born in Paris, France, on August 21, 1923, to Colombian parents, Francisco Laserna Bravo and Elena Pinzón Castillo, and was raised first in Colombia where he attended the Instituto La Salle and then from 1931 to 1932 in Queens in NYC. He graduated from the Gimnasio Moderno in 1940 and went on to study Law for three years at Our Lady of the Rosary University to later change his career and move to the United States to attend Columbia University where he completed his undergraduate studies in Mathematics, Physics, and Humanities in 1948. He would go on to obtain a master's degree at Princeton University and to study German and philosophy at the University of Heidelberg in Germany, and he later obtained a doctorate at the Free University of Berlin. For his life's work he was awarded a Doctorate Honoris Causa by Brandeis University.

Mario Laserna Pinzón is widely admired in his country as an educator, a politician, and a passionate seeker of knowledge, with numerous books and studies to his credit. During the late 1940s and 1950s he became acquainted with many important scientific figures of the day, including Albert Einstein, whom he met while studying at Princeton, and Nicolás Gómez Dávila, his mentor.

In 1948, upon graduating from Columbia, he returned to Colombia and dedicated himself to the creation of a private secular institution of higher learning in Bogotá. His dream became a reality on November 16, 1948, when Los Andes University was founded, institution of which he became rector between 1953 and 1954. He also served as rector of the National University of Colombia (1958–1960).

=== Politics ===
Given his high-profile Laserna was absorbed into politics by those who wanted to present an example of Colombian intellect, and so he served as the Colombian Ambassador to his native France (1976–1979) and to Austria (1987–1990), served in the Senate of Colombia and served as councillor of Bogotá.

He worked in politics as a philosopher interested in learning the workings of government and people which led him to run as Senator representing the radical liberal party of the M-19 Democratic Alliance, even though he himself belonged to the Colombian Conservative Party, he said he joined the M-19 in spite of being a conservative because he "wanted to know how the people who had been [hiding] in the mountain and had returned to civil life thought. Also because they had Bolivarian roots", as he himself was a believer of Bolivarianism.

As a Senator he had to answer to accusations of working with the fugitive Roberto Soto Prieto who had allegedly stolen US$13.5 million and with whom Laserna had connections in Austria through his work as Ambassador, at which time Soto Prieto was an alleged refugee in that country, and through alleged business deals in which Soto was found to be indirectly involved. At the request of the Colombian Minister of Foreign Affairs Noemí Sanín the last five ambassadors to Austria and all employees of the embassy were investigated by the Inspector General of Colombia and the Attorney General of Colombia, among those was Mario Laserna Pinzón. Laserna was later cleared of all charges in respect to the case.

Because of his life's work and contribution to the country, President Álvaro Uribe Vélez honored him with the Order of Boyacá in the Rank of the Grand Cross, the highest civilian honour bestowed by the Republic of Colombia.

== Works ==
Mario Laserna was a prolific reader and writer, which led him to write for various newspapers and to become the director of Revista Semana and the newspaper La República. He also authored various books and essays on Colombian history and government, development in the Third World, and philosophy.

- Mario Laserna Pinzón; Alberto Lleras Camargo (1955), Misión y problema de la universidad [Mission and Problem of the University], Bogotá: Universidad de los Andes, OCLC 24004078
- Mario Laserna Pinzón (1961), Estado fuerte o caudillo: el dilema colombiano [Strong State or Leader: The Colombian Dilemma], Bogotá: Ediciones Mito, OCLC 1969093
- Mario Laserna Pinzón (1963), "Klassenlogik und formale Einteilung der Wissenschaft" [Class logic and Formal Classification in Science], (Dissertation) (in German), Berlin: E. Reuter-Gesellschaft, OCLC 22468251
- Mario Laserna Pinzón (1965), Rousseau y la antinomia de la libertad de Loewenthal [Rousseau and the Antinomy of the Liberty of Loewenthal], Bogotá, OCLC 54993021
- Mario Laserna Pinzón (1966), Estado, consenso, democracia y desarrollo [State, Consensus, Democracy and Development], Bogotá: Ediciones Tercer Mundo, OCLC 3201311
- Mario Laserna Pinzón (1966), La revolución, ¿para qué? : y otros ensayos [The Revolution, For What?: And Other Essays], Bogotá: Ed. Revista Colombiana, LCCN 66077255
- Mario Laserna Pinzón (1969), Individuo y sociedad [Individual and Society], Bogotá: Editorial Revista Colombiana, LCCN 78473074
- Mario Laserna Pinzón (c. 1970), Sociedad post-industrial y países sub-desarrollados [Post-Industrial Society and Underdeveloped Countries], Bogotá: Universidad de los Andes, Programa Alta Gerencia
- Mario Laserna Pinzón (1974), Informe sobre las UPAC y sus incidencias sociales y económicas, Bogotá: Tall. Ed. de la Impr. Nacional de Colombia, ISBN 958-601-074-0
- Mario Laserna Pinzón (1986), Bolívar, un euro-americano frente a la Ilustración : y otros ensayos de interpretación de la historia indo-iberoamericana [Bolivar, a Euro-American in Front of the Enlightenment: and Other Interpretive Essays about Latin-American History], Bogotá: Ediciones Tercer Mundo, ISBN 958-601-074-0
- Mario Laserna Pinzón (1999), Dos ensayos sobre la posibilidad de la historia: Carta de Heidelberg [Two Essays about the Possibility of History: Letter of Heidelberg], Bogotá: Ediciones Uniandes, ISBN 958-695-030-1
- Mario Laserna Pinzón (2003), Reflexiones sobre la Revolución Científica del siglo XVII [Reflections on the Scientific Revolution of the 17th Century], Bogotá: Universidad de los Andes, ISBN 958-695-102-2
- Mario Laserna Pinzón (2004), La Crítica de la Razón Pura, Metalenguaje de la Ciencia [The Critique of Pure Reason, Metalanguage of Science], Bogotá: Universidad de los Andes, ISBN 958-695-136-7
