= John Henry González Duque =

Colombian farmer and activist

John Henry González Duque is a Colombian farmer, activist, speaker, and a labor movement leader in Colombia, most recognized for his involvement with the Small Scale Farmers Movement of Cajibio (Movimiento Campesino de Cajibo).

== Early life and education ==
Born in Cauca, Colombia on August 27, 1966, he later moved to the city of Popayán and studied for the priesthood with the Franciscan Friars of the Province of St. Paul the Apostle in Colombia. He soon changed plans, and returned to his family farm in Cauca.

== Labor activism ==
In 1990, along with other farmers, González Duque founded MCC, Movimiento Campesino de Cajibio (The Small Scale Farmers Movement of Cajibio), which consists of various farmers’ movements in the municipality of Cajibio, Cauca. The group is a self-help organization meant to deal with various problems related affecting local communities in rural Colombia. Since then, González Duque has worked as an international representative of the organization and a key figure in domestic issues affecting low-income farmers in Colombia. In 1999, he became the target of death threats for leading a forum about the impact of planting pine and eucalyptus trees for mass production (monocultures) by the Multinational SMURFIT KAPPA CARDBOARD COLOMBIA, and its effect on water, food security and land ownership.

== International recognition ==
In 2008, González Duque led the MCC as it took part in the Minga of Social and Community Resistance where a public debate was held with the President of the Republic and was followed by a walk from the south of the country to the capital Bogota. About 50,000 people, including members of the indigenous community, students, trade unionists, women and residents of urban areas joined. In 2011, MCC began working towards elaborating a Contingency Plan for Human Rights. In June of that year, the MCC also promoted the "Caravan for life and Presence in the Territory" with the accompaniment from the international community, the United Nations, Vice President office, the Ombudsmans office, Witness for Peace, and other human rights and Social organizations in Colombia, in order to raise awareness of the situation and engage with the national government and international community to protect the welfare of the communities. As a result of these efforts, González Duque traveled across the US, meeting students in university campuses and other labor leaders.

Currently, González Duque is delegated to represent the MCC in national human rights platforms such as the Colombia Europe USA coordination, the Alliance of social and related organizations, as well as the regional organization: Network for Life and Human Rights in Cauca. He is also the national coordinator of the Argo-Environmental Plan of Dignity in Life (Agro-Ambiental del Plan de Vida Digna - Movimiento Campesino de Cajibío). In 2013, he wrote an article about hunger and the politics of food in Colombia.

== See also ==
- Plan Colombia
- Federación Campesina del Cauca
