= Marlon González =

Colombian footballer (born 1989)

Marlon Alberto González (born July 17, 1989) is a Colombian footballer who most recently played for Deportes Palmira in Colombia.

He can play as Striker and was a runner-up of the Copa Mustang in 2006 with Deportivo Cali. He also played for Córdoba FC and Giradot FC in Colombia.

== Honors ==
Champion with Deportivo Cali In Torneo Nacional de Ligas
Champion with Cali en Torneo Internacional en Italia
