= Eduardo Varela Pezzano =

Colombian trademark and entertainment attorney

Eduardo Varela Pezzano (born 15 June 1984) is a Colombian trademark and entertainment law attorney at the legal firm Cavelier Abogados, where is the head of the trademark and copyright practice of the law firm.

He is the son of former Colombian senator Ricardo Varela Consuegra.

== Select publications ==
- Propiedad Intelectual: Reflexiones, Universidad del Rosario, 2012, ISBN 978-95-87-382-46-4, coauthored with Edgar Iván León Robayo & Ricardo Metke.
- Doing Business in Colombia, Juris Publishing, 2011, ISBN 978-1-57823-310-6, coauthored with Natalia Tobón Franco.
- Estudios de Propiedad Intelectual, Universidad del Rosario, 2011, ISBN 978-958-738-190-0, coauthored with Edgar Iván León Robayo & Ricardo Metke.
- Derecho del Entretenimiento para Adultos, Grupo Ed. Ibáñez, 2010, ISBN 978-958-749-034-3, coauthored with Natalia Tobón Franco.
- Derecho de Autor para Creativos, Grupo Ed. Ibáñez, 2010, ISBN 978-958-749-002-2, coauthored with Natalia Tobón Franco.
