= Guillermo París Sanz de Santamaría =

Colombian businessman (1820–1867)

Guillermo París Sanz de Santamaría (June 24, 1820 – December 8, 1867) was a Colombian businessman from Bogotá. He was the son of Col. Mariano París Ricaurte and María Francisca Sanz de Santamaría Ricaurte.

He founded the first serious enterprise of omnibuses in Bogotá which covered mainly the route between Bogotá and Facatativá. The fleet, imported from Philadelphia consisted of four carriages which he named "Azucena", "No me olvides", "Rosita" and "Trinitaria". They were decorated with pictures of actresses, scenes, mirrors and lanterns. The carriages were of such high quality that at least one of them was active for 43 years. This enterprise's contribution to the economic progress of Colombia was commented by various writers.
