= University of La Sabana =

Private university in Colombia

Universidad de La Sabana
- Universidad de La Sabana
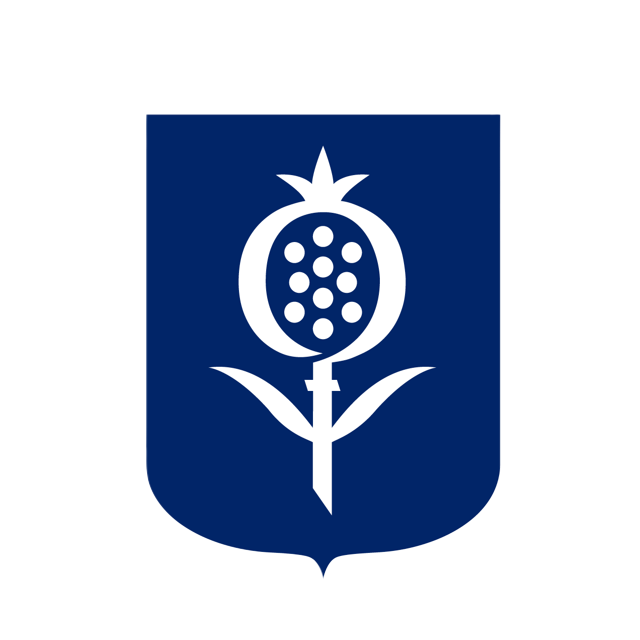
- Type: Private
- Established: 1979
- Principal: Dr. Rolando Roncancio Rachid
- Students: 11,929
- Undergraduates: 8.926
- Postgraduates: 2.603
- Location: Campus del Puente del Común, Km. 7, Autopista Norte de Bogotá. Chía, Cundinamarca, Colombia., Chía, Cundinamarca, Colombia; 4°51′40″N 74°2′1″W
- Campus: Puente del Común
- Nickname: Unisabana
- Mascot: Great egret
- Website: www.unisabana.edu.co

The Universidad de La Sabana is a private university in Colombia, supervised by the Colombian Ministry of Education. It was founded on September 21, 1979, by the Asociación para la Enseñanza Aspaen, its predecessor was the INSE "Instituto Superior de Educación", considered one of the first in distance education in the country and Latin America.

La Sabana is one of the best universities in the country according to several rankings. In the 2023 edition of the QS ranking, the university ranked 701-750 and continues to be among the 100 in Latin America, while in 2020 it was ranked the second best private university in the country in teaching, the third best private university in research at national level and the third best private university in Bogotá, according to The Latin America University Ranking. In 2022 it achieved third place at national level according to icfes.

Its headquarters are located in the municipality of Chía, Cundinamarca and has a large and modern campus. Its student population is 12,158 and usually ranges between 11,500 and 12,500 students, of which approximately 9,000 are undergraduate students, 50 are doctoral students, 1,500 are master's students, 1,400 are specialization students and 230 are medical-surgical specialties.

It is made up of 14 academic units divided into 8 faculties, one school, three institutes and two special units that offer 24 undergraduate programs. In postgraduate programs, it offers 10 doctoral programs, 49 specializations, 18 medical-surgical specialties and 37 master's degrees, for a total of 129 active programs. The university's teaching staff totals 2,140 professors (2019). The teaching staff consists of 463 professors, of whom 35% have doctorates, 53% master's degrees, 4% specialization and 8% undergraduate-professional degrees. There are 1,502 professors.

Octavio Arizmendi Posada (1979–1989), Rafael González Cagigas (1989–1995), Álvaro Mendoza Ramírez (1995–2005) and Obdulio Velásquez Posada (2005–2020) have been its rectors. In 2020, Dr. Rolando Roncancio Rachid was appointed rector, the first graduate of the university to hold this position.

== History ==
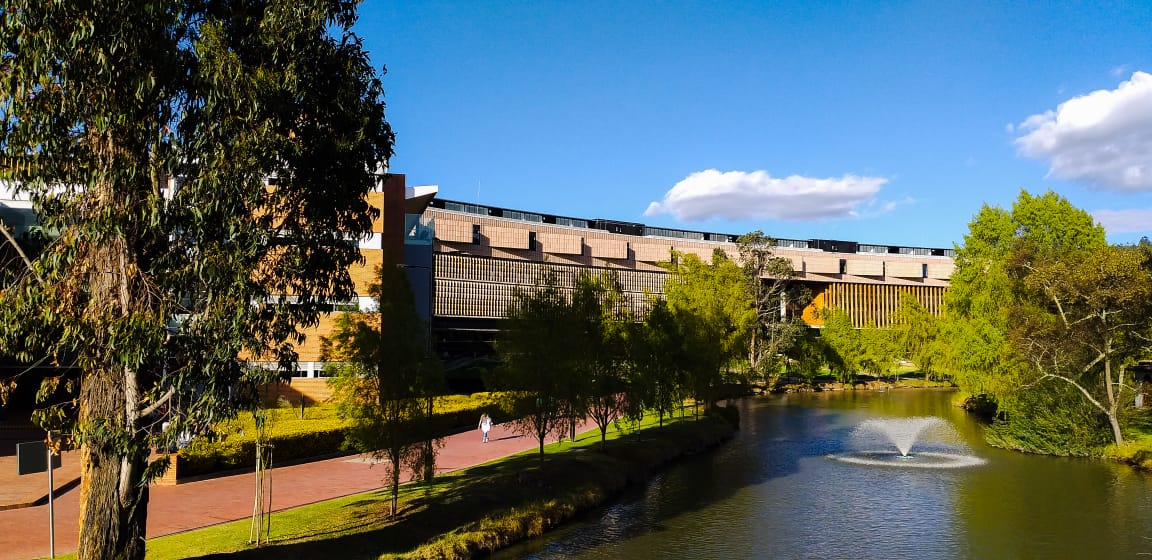
University Campus

The construction of the university's current premises, the Puente del Comun Campus (Spanish: Campus del Puente del Comun), started in 1987 in Chía. The campus grounds cover 62 hectares, 3 hectares of which are sports fields and spaces for outdoor activities.

The Universidad de La Sabana is carrying out a project for the expansion of its campus and the update of its laboratories and technological equipment. At present, over 32,000 square meters have been built. The buildings include 29 laboratories, nine buildings with academic and administrative spaces, and the Octavio Arizmendi Posada Library. The library currently holds 79,726 titles, 172.100 electronic titles, 689 journals and magazines, and 56 databases.

University rankings

Global – Overall
- QS World: 951-1000 (2026)

Other resources are:

Media Production Centre CPM: The faculty of Communication's Media Production Centre CPM—where students are provided resources with the same standards as the ones owned by media companies in Colombia.

Studium: The Department of Foreign Languages and Cultures offers educational initiatives like free courses, diploma courses, research projects, and other academic programmes. The academic and student community of the university has access to English, French and Mandarin language courses.

University Clinic: A health institution and rehabilitation centre. The clinic is a centre for research, teaching and community service. Expansion is expected on the Clinic which will add another floor and enlarge its national and regional coverage. With more than 17,000 square meters of new buildings, the clinic will expand its number of operation rooms, its intensive care unit and the number of hospital rooms and other aspects.

University Chaplaincy: It is responsible for the spiritual care of all people, religious and non-religious, offering spaces for personal and community dialogue. Prayer sites can be found in the plaza de los balcones, where the main Oratory is located; also in building A, in building E, and soon in the Ad Portas building. In addition, in the main Oratory Mass is celebrated every day at 7:20 am and 12:20 pm. The sacrament of confession is available from 11:30 am and during Mass. Every six months there is a Confirmation ceremony. The University of La Sabana has an agreement with the Prelature of Opus Dei to guarantee Christian inspiration is at the foundation of the institution; That is why some Catholic priests of Opus Dei are appointed as chaplains.

== Internationalisation ==
Students at the Universidad de La Sabana are able to participate in foreign exchange programs, internships, and specialisations at universities in Germany, Australia, France, Japan, Spain, Argentina, Chile, Mexico, the United States, and Canada, among others. Some of the students also have the double degree option for undergraduate studies. They may also be awarded the undergraduate degree from Universidad de La Sabana and their postgraduate degree from an international university. The university hosts foreign students from around the world.

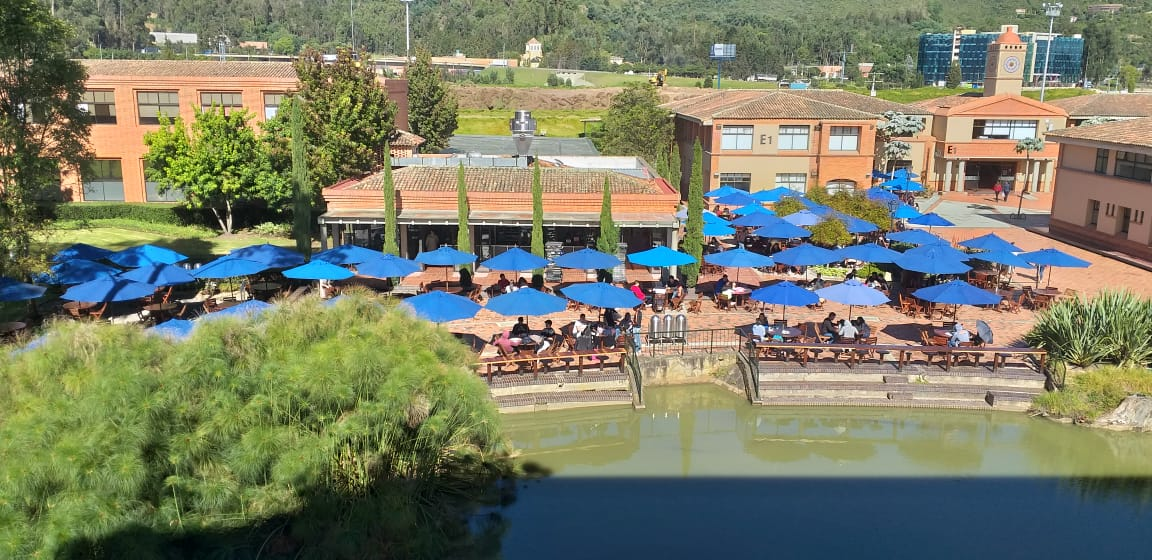
View of the "Embarcadero" area

== Notable alumni ==
- Sonia Velásquez, journalist
