= Miguel Amín Escaf =

Colombian architect and politician

Member of the Colombian Chamber of Representatives from Atlántico
- In office 20 July 2006 – 19 July 2010

Personal details
- Born: 5 September 1948 (age 78) Barranquilla, Colombia
- Party: Social Party of National Unity
- Education: Pontifical Bolivarian University

Miguel Amín Escaf (born 5 September 1948) is a Colombian architect and politician, who served in the Chamber of Representatives of Colombia.
