= Klaus Fruchtnis =

- Born: Klaus Fruchtnis; Colombia

Klaus Fruchtnis is a photographer, digital artist and lecturer. He has a degree in visual arts from Rennes and a master in Arts and Digital Media from the Sorbonne. His research is based on the areas of photography, multimedia, digital drawing and media experimentation and is related to the word "space", and it has been characterized by its itinerary and its way of evolution over the last years. He questions the image, its origin and its incidence in the current art world, through new technologies and different ways of perceiving art, as well as how they influence our daily life. In November 2014, he was named Photography Chair of the Paris College of Art.

Klaus Fruchtnis was born in Colombia in 1978.

== Artwork ==
His artwork has been internationally exhibited including at Cultural Center Matadero, Huesca; Nuit Blanche 2014, Bogotá; Fabbrica del Vapore, Milan; Nuit Blanche 2013, Montréal; La Friche Kodak, Sevran; Museo de la Fotografía, Lima; Centre Georges Pompidou, Paris; La Criée Centre d’Art Contemporain, Rennes; Proekt Fabrika Art Centre, Moscow; ArtBo, Bogotá; Sydney Olympic Park, Sydney; Museo de Arte Moderno, Medellin; AAF Contemporary Art Fair, New York; Toronto International Art Fair, Toronto; Marina Kessler Gallery, Miami; Muestra 2, Mexico.

== Selected talks ==
- "Artista. Institución. Territorio" (23 May 2014), Hangar, Barcelona, Spain
- "Lab Life" (7 December 2013), La Gaîté Lyrique, Paris, France

== Selected publications ==
- "Cross Urban" (with Cynthia Lawson Jaramillo), CitiesPlus,
