= Time-use research =

Study of how people allocate their time

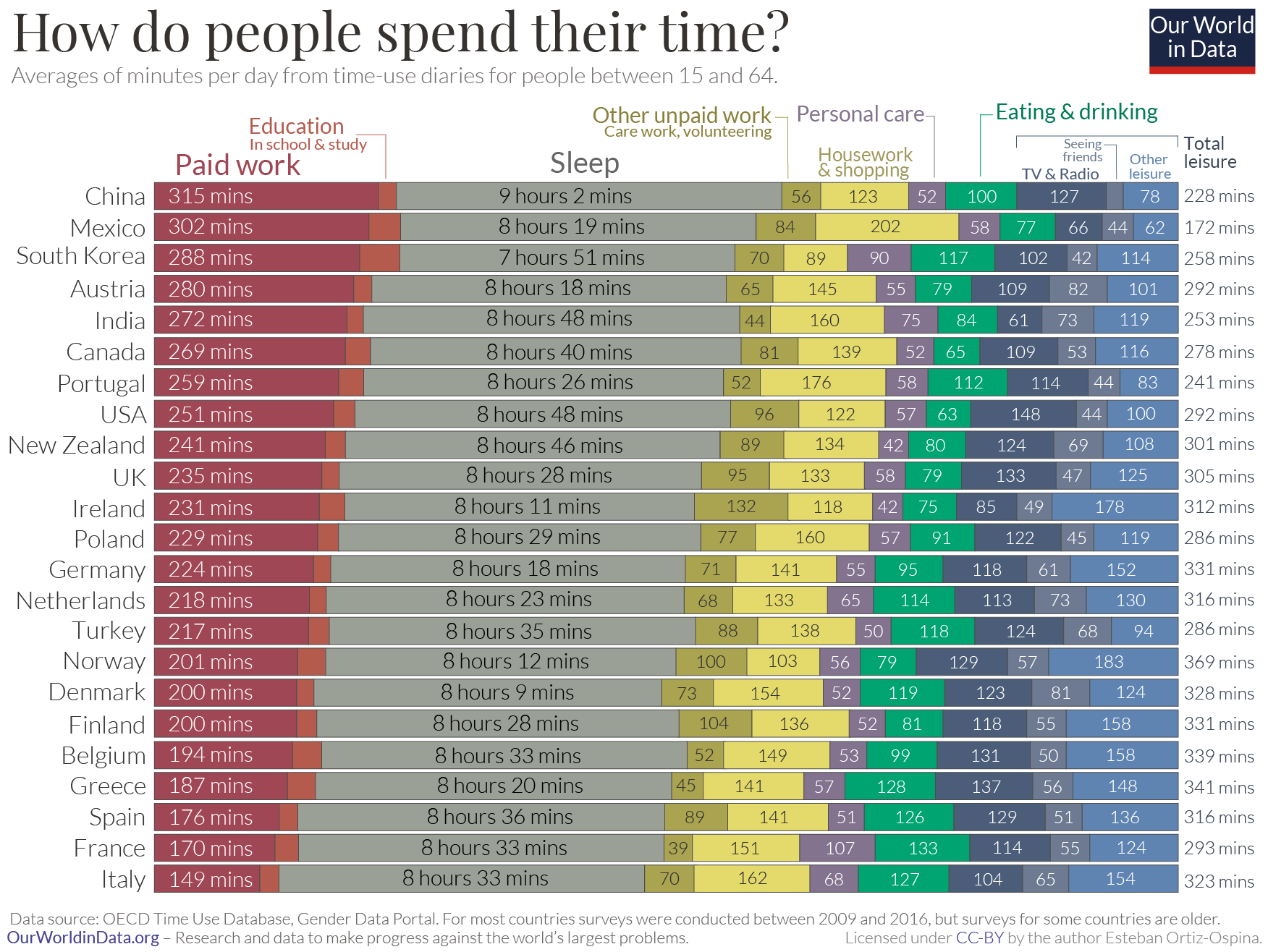
An example of time-use research.

Time-use research is an interdisciplinary field of study dedicated to learning how people allocate their time during an average day. Work intensity is the umbrella topic that incorporates time use, specifically time poverty.

The comprehensive approach to time-use research addresses a wide array of political, economic, social, and cultural issues through the use of time-use surveys. Surveys provide geographic data and time diaries that volunteers record using GPS technology. Time-use research investigates human activity inside and outside the paid economy. It also looks at how these activities change over time.

A major U.S. source for time-use research is the American Time Use Survey, which provides nationally representative estimates of how, where, and with whom Americans spend their time. It is the only federal survey covering the full range of nonmarket activities, including childcare and volunteering. Its public data files include more than 258,000 interviews conducted from 2003 through 2025 and can be linked to Current Population Survey records.

A chart showing the average daily hours adults in the U.S. spent using digital media with a fidelity that distinguishes different device types

Time-use research is not to be confused with time management. Time-use research is a social science interested in human behavioural patterns and seeks to build a body of knowledge to benefit a wide array of disciplines interested in how people use their time. Time management is an approach to time allocation with a specific managerial purpose aimed at increasing the efficiency or effectiveness of a given process.

Questions relating to time-use research arise in most professional and academic disciplines, notably:

- urban planning and urban design (how does community design impact people's use of time?)
- transportation planning (what groups use active transportation and public transit?)
- social work (how do people maintain social relationships and who is more likely to spend time alone?)
- recreation and active living (which groups are more physically active?)
- information technology (what role does information technology play in people's daily lives?)
- feminist economics (how does non-market work affect gender inequality and economic well-beings in our society?)

== Categories of time ==
Time-use researcher Dagfinn Aas classifies time into four meaningful categories: contracted time; committed time; necessary time; and free time.

=== Contracted time ===
Contracted time refers to the time a person allocates toward an agreement to work or study. When a person is using contracted time to commute this person understands that this travel time is directly related to paid work or study and any break in this commute time directly affects job- or school-related performance.

=== Committed time ===
Committed time, like contracted time, takes priority over necessary and free time because it is viewed as productive work. It refers to the time allocated to maintain a home and family. When a person is commuting using committed time this person may feel that the commute is a duty to family such as walking children to school or driving a spouse to work. Contracted and committed time users may feel that their commute is more important than the commute of necessary or free time users because their commute is productive work. Therefore, they may be more inclined to choose a motorized mode of travel.

=== Necessary time ===
Necessary time refers to the time required to maintain one’s self as it applies to activities such as eating, sleeping, and cleansing and to a large extent exercising. People who commute using necessary time may feel that the commute is an important activity for personal well-being and may also take into account the well-being of the natural and social environment. The person commuting in necessary time may be more inclined to choose an active mode of transportation for personal reasons that include exercise on top of transportation.

Since sleeping is included in this category, necessary time usually constitutes the majority of people’s time.

=== Free time ===
Free time refers to the remains of the day after the three other types of time have been subtracted from the 24-hour day. This type of time is not necessarily discretionary time as the term “free” time may imply because people tend to plan activities in advance and create committed free time in lieu of discretionary time. People who commute using free time are more apt to view the commute as a recreational activity. Commuting in free time provides the greatest gains for social capital because the individual commuting in free time is more likely to slow down or stop the commute at their discretion to undertake another activity or engage in social interaction. The commuter may also view the commute as part of their destination activity, to which they have gladly committed their free time.

== Primary vs. secondary time ==
The distinction between primary and secondary time is a way to include activities when multitasking. Activities that take place at the same time are separated into primary and secondary categories based on priority assigned to each, with the activity with the highest priority considered to be the primary. This distinction plays an important role when evaluating time spent on activities that often considered secondary when multitasking, as overlooking secondary activities can lead to significant underestimations of the time committed to those activities.

According to research in Australia, approximately two thirds of time spent on childcare is considered secondary time. Research in the United States is more variable ranging from approximately one third to approximately three fourths of time spent on childcare being secondary time.

=== Primary time ===
Primary time refers to time spent on a primary activity only. The primary activity is the activity that has the highest priority. For example, the primary task when drinking coffee while working would be working and the time therefore classified as contracted time. Assigning priority to each activity is left up to the person recording their time usage and similar combinations of activities may be treated differently under different circumstances. While eating in front of a television, both eating and watching television could be considered the primary activity depending on the circumstances.

=== Secondary time ===
Secondary time is the time spent on secondary or side activities. When drinking coffee while working, drinking coffee would be the secondary activity and would be considered necessary time even though the primary activity, working, would be classified as contracted time. Unlike primary time, secondary time does not necessarily add up to 24 hours each day because there may not always be a secondary activity. It is also important to note that including secondary time may make it appear that a person spends more than 24 hours a day on activities due to the overlapping nature primary and secondary time.

== Journals ==
- electronic International Journal of Time Use Research
- Review of Economics of the Household
- Demography — Scope and links to issue contents & abstracts.
- Journal of Population Economics — Aims and scope and 20th Anniversary statement, 2006.
- Feminist Economics

== See also ==
- Return on time invested
- Time geography
- Time poverty
