= Pelayo Correa =

Colombian pathologist (1927–2025)

- Born: Pelayo Jesus Correa; July 3, 1927; Sonsón, Colombia
- Died: November 20, 2025 (aged 98); Brentwood, Tennessee, U.S.
- Education: Universidad de Antioquia Medical School
- Occupation: Pathologist
- Medical career
- Field: Etiology of gastric cancer
- Institutions: Universidad del Valle Medical School
- Sub-specialties: Environmental causes of cancer in Colombia

Pelayo Jesus Correa (July 3, 1927 – November 20, 2025) was a Colombian pathologist best known for defining "Correa's cascade", defining stepwise changes between normal stomach tissue and stomach cancer.

== Education and early life ==
Pelayo Correa was born in Sonson, Colombia, on July 3, 1927. He received his medical education at the Universidad de Antioquia and Emory University.

== Academic career ==
Correa served as a faculty member at the Universidad del Valle Medical School in Cali, Colombia, from 1954 to 1970, becoming the chairman of the pathology department. He was a visiting scientist at the US National Cancer institute Biometry Branch from 1970 to 1973. He served as the Boyd Professor of Pathology at the Medical Center of Louisiana at New Orleans from 1973 to 2005. After his research laboratory was destroyed during Hurricane Katrina in 2005, he became a professor of pathology at Vanderbilt University, retiring in 2015.

He was a long-time collaborator of epidemiologist, William Haenszel of the US National Cancer Institute, with whom he researched environmental causes of cancer in Colombia. He had a particular interest in the etiology of gastric cancer and the role of Helicobacter pylori in stomach disease. Correa published over 600 papers and book chapters on gastroenterology during his career.

== Awards and honors ==
- 1992: American Association for Cancer Research Award for Research Excellence in Cancer Epidemiology and Prevention
- 2013: Distinguished Achievement Award from the American Gastroenterological Association

== Personal life and death ==
Correa died in Brentwood, Tennessee on November 20, 2025, at the age of 98.
