= Sonia Velásquez =

Colombian media personality

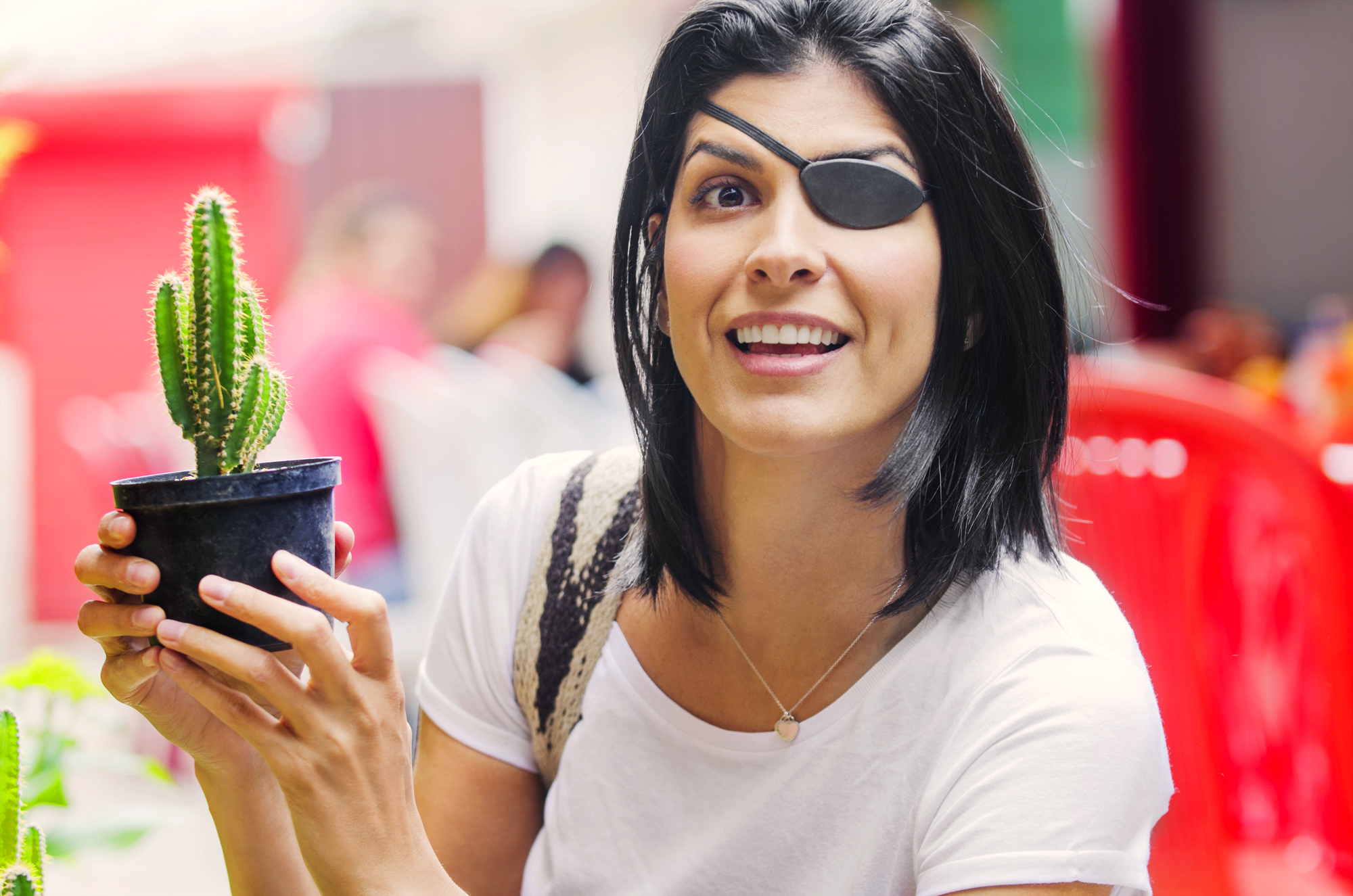
- Born: Sonia Margarita Velásquez Mendoza; 13 March 1977 (age 49); Montería, Colombia

Sonia Velásquez (born as Sonia Margarita Velásquez Mendoza, on 13 March 1977 in Montería, Colombia) is a journalist, presenter, and audiovisual producer.

== Early life ==
Velásquez grew up in Montería, Córdoba.

At 17 years old went to the University of the Savannah in Bogotá to pursue a career of Social Communication and Journalism. While she studied she ventured in the modeling world for some years. Before graduating she presented for the channel Caracol Television, the program of trips, Recorridos, issued also in Caracol International. After this program she moved to Miami, Florida, where she continued her course in television. She presented the reports show Pasos Audaces, of NBC Telemundo with broadcast in United States.

Afterwards she produced and presented Fashion Art Show of FTV Latin America and conducted Uniendo Mundos of Caracol Radio, interviewing Latin American social entrepreneurs.

== Career ==
Later she moved to Argentina, where she initiated her history in one of her insignia works, presenting Extreme Makeover: Home Edition Latin America, being the only host that remained the three seasons, reconstructing houses in Mexico, Chile and Argentina.

At the same time, she continued with her humanitarian mission in ICW Global (international community of women living with HIV/@Sida) and as the image of the campaign "Lágrimas de Sangre" (Tears of Blood) of the foundation More Peace Less Sida.

Velásquez has been positioned as a leader in the home improvement market (DIY) for the Latins, with a community of more than 30 thousand followers in Facebook. She uses the social networks-media to give color and decoration tips under the title of "Decorate with Sonia". Likewise, she produces how-to videos, where she teaches how to do home improvement projects by oneself.

Currently she is ambassador of color of Sherwin-Williams, ambassador of Ashoka (international network of social entrepreneurship) and exerts as an audiovisual and transmedia producer in her own company, DIP (digital interactive productions).

== Philanthropic work ==
Sonia is recognized as a pioneer in philanthropic journalism through Uniendo Mundos, radial program (2007–2011) which features testimonies of entrepreneurs, missionaries and volunteers who work to help communities in need. This way, she began producing and hosting a philanthropic radio segment "Uniendo Mundos" In South Florida's major audience program " Side Effects " with the Spanish broadcaster Jose Ponseti.

Some organizations that obtained broadcasting on Uniendo Mundos are : Children of the Andes Foundation, Growing Together Foundation, Peace Corps, New School Project Yes, Ride For Kids, Nurture Foundation, Mi Sangre Foundation, Oro Verde, Foundation Changed Hand, developing Minds Foundation, among others.

Uniendo Mundos recently changed its name to DIP Social, transmedia initiative, offering multiplatform advice for foundations so that they may have digital video tools. DIP Social is a nonprofit foundation by DIP Digital interactive productions.

== Awards and recognition ==
The Recognition To the Merit (award given by the government of Córdoba, Colombia, 2015, to people that contribute to the general welfare of the national and/or international population).
