= List of countries by access to clean water =

Share of the population without access to an improved water source, 2020

Global access to clean water is a significant global challenge that affects the health, well-being, and development of people worldwide. While progress has been made in recent years, millions of people still lack access to safe and clean drinking water sources.

According to the World Health Organization (WHO) and UNICEF, as of 2020, approximately two billion people globally do not have access to safely managed drinking water. This lack of access leads to various consequences, including increased vulnerability to waterborne diseases, reduced educational opportunities, gender inequalities, and economic burdens.

== Ranking by access to improved water source ==
An improved water source, as defined by the World Health Organization (WHO), refers to a drinking water source that provides adequate and safe water for human consumption. Examples of improved water sources include piped water connections, protected wells, boreholes with hand pumps, packaged or delivered water and rainwater collection systems with appropriate treatment.

Rank	Country / dependency	% unimp. water	Year
1	Papua New Guinea	%	2022
2	Madagascar	42.00%	2022
3	Democratic Republic of the Congo	40.90%	2022
4	Central African Republic	37.10%	2022
5	Chad	35.50%	2022
6	Angola	33.00%	2022
7	Equatorial Guinea	32.38%	2017
8	Niger	31.50%	2022
9	Eritrea	30.55%	2016
10	Kenya	28.50%	2022
11	Sierra Leone	27.20%	2022
12	Mozambique	27.00%	2022
13	Solomon Islands	26.90%	2020
14	Zambia	25.30%	2022
15	Benin	24.60%	2022
16	Guinea-Bissau	23.40%	2022
17	Zimbabwe	23.20%	2022
18	Tanzania	23.00%	2022
19	Haiti	22.90%	2022
20	Togo	22.80%	2022
21	South Sudan	21.50%	2022
22	Burkina Faso	21.00%	2022
23	Ethiopia	20.50%	2022
24	Kiribati	20.00%	2022
25	Côte d'Ivoire	18.90%	2022
26	Burundi	18.20%	2022
27	Myanmar	16.90%	2022
28	Nicaragua	16.78%	2020
29	Afghanistan	16.70%	2022
30	Eswatini	16.60%	2022
31	Guinea	16.40%	2022
32	Cameroon	16.20%	2022
33	Nigeria	16.10%	2022
34	Uganda	15.80%	2022
35	Republic of the Congo	15.75%	2020
36	Rwanda	15.60%	2022
37	Tajikistan	15.50%	2022
38	Lesotho	15.40%	2022
39	Liberia	14.40%	2022
40	Somalia	13.30%	2022
40	Mauritania	13.30%	2022
42	Mali	11.70%	2022
43	East Timor	11.10%	2022
44	Laos	11.00%	2022
44	Senegal	11.00%	2022
46	Morocco	10.90%	2022
47	Cambodia	10.50%	2022
48	Poland	9.60%	2022
49	Mongolia	9.30%	2022
50	Djibouti	9.10%	2022
51	Comoros	8.93%	2019
52	Sri Lanka	8.90%	2022
53	Yemen	8.80%	2022
54	Gambia	8.40%	2022
55	Vanuatu	8.10%	2022
56	Malawi	7.30%	2022
57	Namibia	7.00%	2022
58	Republic of Moldova	6.40%	2022
59	Kyrgyzstan	6.30%	2022
60	Sudan	6.20%	2022
60	Venezuela	6.20%	2022
62	Bolivia	5.70%	2022
62	Ghana	5.70%	2022
64	French Guiana	5.60%	2022
65	North Korea	5.40%	2022
66	Gabon	5.10%	2022
67	Indonesia	5.00%	2022
68	Pakistan	4.90%	2022
69	Saint Vincent and the Grenadines	4.85%	2018
70	Falkland Islands	4.69%	2020
71	Peru	4.60%	2022
71	Nepal	4.60%	2022
73	Dominica	4.58%	2017
74	Cayman Islands	4.50%	2022
75	Guatemala	4.40%	2022
76	Ecuador	4.30%	2022
77	Ireland	4.00%	2022
78	Marshall Islands	3.90%	2022
79	Fiji	3.80%	2022
80	Mayotte	3.60%	2022
80	Seychelles	3.60%	2022
80	Jamaica	3.60%	2022
83	Panama	3.50%	2022
84	Grenada	3.21%	2017
85	Honduras	3.10%	2022
86	Albania	3.00%	2022
86	Niue	3.00%	2022
88	Botswana	2.90%	2022
89	Dominican Republic	2.80%	2022
89	South Africa	2.80%	2022
91	Cape Verde	2.70%	2022
92	Kazakhstan	2.62%	2020
93	Anguilla	2.52%	2017
94	India	2.50%	2022
94	Malaysia	2.50%	2022
96	Cuba	2.40%	2022
97	Sao Tome and Principe	2.30%	2022
97	Russia	2.30%	2022
97	Philippines	2.30%	2022
97	Georgia	2.30%	2022
97	Colombia	2.30%	2022
102	Aruba	2.13%	2016
103	Vietnam	2.00%	2022
103	Lithuania	2.00%	2022
105	Montserrat	1.90%	2022
105	China	1.90%	2022
107	Guyana	1.70%	2022
108	Antigua and Barbuda	1.60%	2022
108	Uzbekistan	1.60%	2022
110	Saint Kitts and Nevis	1.39%	2017
111	Croatia	1.32%	2007
112	Saint Lucia	1.30%	2022
112	Azerbaijan	1.30%	2022
114	United States Virgin Islands	1.28%	2020
115	Barbados	1.20%	2022
115	Tunisia	1.20%	2022
115	El Salvador	1.20%	2022
118	Bahamas	1.11%	2019
119	Egypt	1.00%	2022
119	Turkey	1.00%	2022
121	Argentina	0.98%	2016
122	Suriname	0.90%	2022
122	Bulgaria	0.90%	2022
122	Saint Helena	0.90%	2022
122	Jordan	0.90%	2022
122	Japan	0.90%	2022
127	Canada	0.80%	2022
128	Wallis and Futuna	0.70%	2022
128	Ukraine	0.70%	2022
128	Portugal	0.70%	2022
128	Iraq	0.70%	2022
128	Bangladesh	0.70%	2022
128	Samoa	0.70%	2022
128	Saudi Arabia	0.70%	2022
135	Montenegro	0.60%	2022
135	Macedonia	0.60%	2022
137	Belarus	0.50%	2022
137	Slovenia	0.50%	2022
137	New Caledonia	0.50%	2022
137	Serbia	0.50%	2022
137	Curacao	0.50%	2017
142	Palau	0.40%	2022
142	Latvia	0.40%	2022
142	Algeria	0.40%	2022
142	Brazil	0.40%	2022
142	Maldives	0.40%	2022
142	Iran	0.40%	2022
148	Belize	0.30%	2022
148	Tuvalu	0.30%	2022
148	Palestine	0.30%	2022
148	Tonga	0.30%	2022
148	Guam	0.30%	2022
148	Mexico	0.30%	2022
148	Tokelau	0.30%	2022
148	Martinique	0.30%	2022
148	Sweden	0.30%	2022
148	Oman	0.30%	2022
158	American Samoa	0.23%	2020
159	Cyprus	0.20%	2022
159	Bhutan	0.20%	2022
159	Turks and Caicos Islands	0.20%	2022
162	British Virgin Islands	0.10%	2022
162	Czech Republic	0.10%	2022
162	Isle of Man	0.10%	2022
162	Luxembourg	0.10%	2022
162	Guadeloupe	0.10%	2022
162	Libya	0.10%	2022
162	Brunei	0.10%	2022
162	Bermuda	0.10%	2022
162	Syria	0.10%	2022
162	Italy	0.10%	2022
162	Bahrain	0.10%	2022
162	Spain	0.10%	2022
162	Saint Martin	0.10%	2022
162	Bosnia and Herzegovina	0.10%	2022
162	Reunion	0.10%	2022
177	United States	0.00%	2022
177	Armenia	0.00%	2022
177	Australia	0.00%	2022
177	Cook Islands	0.00%	2022
177	Qatar	0.00%	2022
177	United Kingdom	0.00%	2022
177	France	0.00%	2022
177	Belgium	0.00%	2022
177	Netherlands	0.00%	2022
177	Germany	0.00%	2022
177	Switzerland	0.00%	2022
177	Andorra	0.00%	2022
177	Austria	0.00%	2022
177	Uruguay	0.00%	2022
177	Turkmenistan	0.00%	2022
177	United Arab Emirates	100%	2022
177	Trinidad and Tobago	0.00%	2022
177	Thailand	0.00%	2022
177	Slovakia	0.00%	2022
177	Singapore	0.00%	2022
177	Romania	0.00%	2022
177	Puerto Rico	0.00%	2022
177	Paraguay	0.00%	2022
177	Norway	0.00%	2022
177	New Zealand	0.00%	2022
177	Lebanon	0.00%	2022
177	Israel	0.00%	2022
177	Hungary	0.00%	2022
177	Hong Kong	0.00%	2022
177	Greece	0.00%	2022
177	Finland	0.00%	2022
177	Estonia	0.00%	2022
177	Denmark	0.00%	2022
177	Costa Rica	0.00%	2022
177	Chile	0.00%	2022
177	French Polynesia	0.00%	2022
177	Greenland	0.00%	2022
177	Iceland	0.00%	2022
177	Kuwait	0.00%	2022
177	Liechtenstein	0.00%	2022
177	Malta	0.00%	2022
177	Mauritius	0.00%	2022
177	Monaco	0.00%	2022
177	San Marino	0.00%	2022
177	Faroe Islands	0.00%	2022
177	Gibraltar	0.00%	2022
177	Macao	0.00%	2022
177	Northern Mariana Islands	0.00%	2022
177	Saint Barthelemy	0.00%	2022
177	South Korea	0.00%	2022
177	Nauru	0.00%	2020

== Ranking by access to safe drinking water ==
List of countries by share of population with access to safe drinking water. Safe drinking water is water from an improved water source which is reliable and free from contamination.

Rank	Country	Share with access to safe drinking water (%)	Year
1	Hungary	100.00%	2022
1	Iceland	100.00%	2022
1	Kuwait	100.00%	2022
1	Liechtenstein	100.00%	2022
1	Macau	100.00%	2022
1	Monaco	100.00%	2022
1	New Zealand	100.00%	2022
1	Saint Barthelemy	100.00%	2022
1	San Marino	100.00%	2022
1	Singapore	100.00%	2022
13	Netherlands	99.97%	2022
14	Denmark	99.92%	2022
14	Germany	99.92%	2022
16	Puerto Rico	99.87%	2022
17	United Kingdom	99.80%	2022
18	Malta	99.77%	2022
18	Cyprus	99.77%	2022
20	Belgium	99.74%	2022
20	Sweden	99.74%	2022
22	Isle of Man	99.71%	2022
23	France	99.70%	2022
24	Finland	99.64%	2022
25	Spain	99.57%	2022
26	Luxembourg	99.53%	2022
27	Israel	99.47%	2022
28	South Korea	99.28%	2022
29	Slovakia	99.18%	2022
30	Guam	99.06%	2022
31	Canada	99.04%	2022
32	Bahrain	98.90%	2022
32	Austria	98.90%	2022
34	Greece	98.88%	2022
35	Norway	98.82%	2022
36	Chile	98.77%	2022
36	Martinique	98.77%	2022
38	Japan	98.66%	2022
39	American Samoa	98.36%	2020
40	Slovenia	98.27%	2022
41	United States Virgin Islands	97.94%	2020
42	Czech Republic	97.88%	2022
43	United States	97.47%	2022
44	Latvia	97.11%	2022
45	Estonia	97.02%	2022
46	New Caledonia	96.87%	2022
47	Greenland	96.74%	2020
48	Switzerland	96.70%	2022
49	Qatar	96.65%	2022
50	Saint Martin	96.63%	2022
51	Ireland	95.99%	2022
52	Reunion	95.75%	2022
53	Guadeloupe	95.71%	2022
54	Bulgaria	95.65%	2022
55	Portugal	95.16%	2022
56	Lithuania	94.98%	2022
57	Turkmenistan	94.88%	2022
58	Iran	94.22%	2022
59	Malaysia	93.94%	2022
60	Niue	93.54%	2022
61	Belarus	93.10%	2022
62	Italy	92.71%	2022
63	Mayotte	92.46%	2022
64	French Guiana	91.49%	2022
65	Oman	90.85%	2022
66	Andorra	90.64%	2022
67	Northern Mariana Islands	90.64%	2022
68	Palau	90.44%	2022
69	Kazakhstan	89.33%	2020
70	Saint Helena	89.23%	2022
71	Poland	88.91%	2022
72	Ukraine	87.62%	2022
73	Brazil	87.26%	2022
74	Grenada	87.12%	2017
75	Bosnia and Herzegovina	86.97%	2022
76	Jordan	85.71%	2022
77	Montenegro	85.12%	2022
78	Armenia	82.41%	2022
79	Croatia	82.14%	2007
80	Romania	82.07%	2022
81	French Polynesia	81.81%	2022
82	Costa Rica	80.51%	2022
83	Macedonia	80.45%	2022
84	Palestine	80.33%	2022
85	Uzbekistan	79.85%	2022
86	Kyrgyzstan	76.49%	2022
87	Russia	76.23%	2022
88	Republic of Moldova	75.22%	2022
89	Serbia	75.08%	2022
90	Morocco	74.82%	2022
91	Tunisia	74.30%	2022
92	Colombia	73.86%	2022
93	Bhutan	73.34%	2022
94	Azerbaijan	71.61%	2022
95	Albania	70.74%	2022
96	Algeria	70.60%	2022
97	Georgia	69.14%	2022
98	Wallis and Futuna	68.88%	2022
99	Ecuador	67.09%	2022
100	North Korea	66.53%	2022
101	Honduras	65.21%	2022
102	Paraguay	64.22%	2022
103	Samoa	62.19%	2022
104	Iraq	59.74%	2022
105	Bangladesh	59.11%	2022
106	Vietnam	57.78%	2022
107	Myanmar	57.40%	2022
108	Guatemala	56.29%	2022
109	Suriname	55.80%	2022
110	Nicaragua	55.52%	2020
111	Tajikistan	55.29%	2022
112	Peru	51.99%	2022
113	Pakistan	50.60%	2022
114	Philippines	47.90%	2022
115	Lebanon	47.70%	2022
116	Gambia	47.67%	2022
117	Sri Lanka	47.13%	2022
118	Turks and Caicos Islands	47.09%	2022
119	Republic of the Congo	45.90%	2020
120	Dominican Republic	44.94%	2022
121	Ghana	44.47%	2022
122	Côte d'Ivoire	43.89%	2022
123	Mexico	43.04%	2022
124	Fiji	41.86%	2022
125	Mongolia	39.28%	2022
126	Sao Tome and Principe	36.30%	2022
127	Indonesia	30.27%	2022
128	Afghanistan	30.03%	2022
129	Tonga	29.53%	2022
130	Cambodia	29.13%	2022
131	Nigeria	28.98%	2022
132	Lesotho	28.22%	2022
133	Senegal	26.69%	2022
134	Zimbabwe	26.52%	2022
135	Guinea-Bissau	23.87%	2022
136	Madagascar	22.24%	2022
137	Togo	19.42%	2022
138	Uganda	18.68%	2022
139	Laos	17.87%	2022
140	Malawi	17.76%	2022
141	Nepal	16.12%	2022
142	Kiribati	14.41%	2022
143	Ethiopia	13.24%	2022
144	Rwanda	12.10%	2020
145	Democratic Republic of the Congo	11.58%	2022
146	Tanzania	11.34%	2022
147	Sierra Leone	10.26%	2022
148	Tuvalu	8.71%	2022
149	Chad	6.25%	2022
150	Central African Republic	6.13%	2022
