= Guillermo Torres Barrera =

Colombian politician and lawyer

- Born: c.1936
- Died: June 25, 1988 (aged 52); Hollywood, Florida, US
- Occupations: politician and lawyer
- Known for: served in Senate of Colombia

Guillermo Torres Barrera (c.1936 – June 25, 1988) was a Colombian politician, and lawyer. He served in Colombia's senate for four terms. He was 52 when he died on June 25, 1988, from a heart attack while living in Hollywood, Florida.
