= Eduardo Posada Flórez =

Colombian scientist

Eduardo Posada
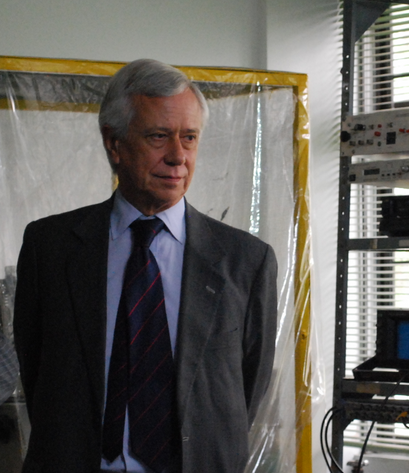
- Born: 1942 (age 83–84); Bogotá, Colombia
- Education: University of Lausanne
- Scientific career
- Fields: Physicist
- Workplaces: International Centre of Physics

Eduardo Posada Flórez (born 1942) is a Colombian physicist and the executive director of COMSATS’ Centre of Excellence in Colombia, the International Centre of Physics (CIF), and is the chairperson of COMSATS’ Coordinating Council, comprising the Heads of Centres of Excellence.

== Early life ==
Born in Bogotá, Colombia, in 1942, Dr. Posada completed his bachelor's degree in physics in 1966 at the University of Lausanne (Switzerland) and, in 1972, received a Ph.D in physics with honors.

== Work ==
As one of the fathers of Science, Technology, and Innovation policy in Colombia, Dr. Posada is the co-founder of the Centro Internacional de Física (CIF), where he has promoted important projects in basic and applied research. He helped pass the Science and Technology Act (Act 29 of 1990). President Cesar Gaviria made Posada a member of the Mission of Science, Education and Development, also called the Wise Mission, in 1993.

Dr. Posada is a Professor Emeritus at the National University of Colombia (1990). At the National University in Bogotá, he has been the principal investigator of several projects founded by Colciencias, specializing in superconductivity and semiconductor physics. Some of his contributions in physics stem from his research into low temperatures, cryogenics and superconductivity that were undertaken in Colombia and in Europe. As an academician, Posada has directed more than 30 undergraduate and graduate theses.

Besides his current full membership in the Colombian Academy of Sciences, Posada has been the president of the Colombian Society of Physics (1984-1987), president of the Association for International Physics Center (ACIF) (1982-1987), and president of the Association Interscience (1993-1994). Currently, Posada is the President of the Colombian Association for the Advancement of Science (ACAC), which is a promoter of the Colombian legislation for science and technology.

Posada is involved in other scientific and educational institutions, such as the Research Institute on Corrosion in Bucaramanga. He was influential in creating the Museum of Science and Technology (also known as Maloka), where he is president of the board of directors; the scientific fair Expociencia; and the general readership journal Innovación y Ciencia.

Commercial centers for science, research and industry founded or co-founded by Posada include Innovate Corporation, the Research Corporation for Corrosion, Liocol Ltd., Holocol Ltd., Tec-Laser SA, and Rexco Industries Ltd. Posada has also been the Director of the Technical Physics Group (1975-1992) at the Research Laboratory in Coffee Chemistry of the National Federation of Coffee Growers of Colombia.

== Memberships ==
- International Scientific Council of the International Centre for Theoretical Physics (ICTP) at Trieste (1984-1988)
- Board of the Faculty of Science at the National University of Colombia (1989-1990)
- Committee on Support of Research of the National University of Colombia (1990-1991)
- Board of the National Development and Industrial Quality (1990-1992)
- Board of the Nuclear Affairs Institute (1991-1994)
- Board of the National Bank Foundation (1992-2003)
- Commission on Science, Education and Development (1993-1994)
- Board of Directors of the Corporation Innovation (1994)
- Board of National Basic Science Programme (1992-1994)
- Board of the Research Corporation for Corrosion (1995 - to date)

== Awards and honours ==
- The National Science Prize ‘Alejandro Angel Escobar’ (1989)
- Scientific Merit Medal in Gold Category Colombian Science Foundation (2006)
- Researcher Emeritus of the Attorney General's Office (2011)
- Award for Exemplary Colombian (Science) (2013)

== Personal life ==
Dr. Posada Flórez is married and the father of three children.
