= Silvia Blair =

Colombian scientist

Silvia Blair Trujillo
- Other names: Silvia Blair; Silvia Blair-Trujillo
- Education: University of Antioquia; National University of Colombia
- Known for: Malaria
- Scientific career
- Fields: Parasitology; Tropical Medicine; History

Silvia Blair Trujillo is a Colombian scientist, known for her research on antimalarial compounds found in traditional plants from her country. During her research career, Blair has received various awards and recognitions, such as the Héctor Abad Gómez Medal to merits in Public Health in 1992, an honorable mention in the area of Basic Experimental Sciences in 2000, a Francisco José de Caldas Medal for University Excellence in 2008, and was named emeritus Professor of the University of Antioquia in 2017.

== Career ==
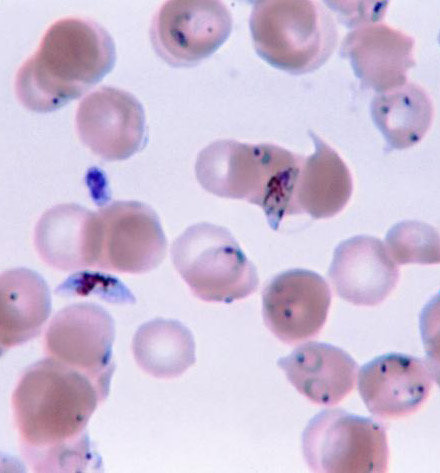
Blair's research has focused mainly on malaria in Colombia.

Silvia Blair studied medicine at the University of Antioquia, graduating in 1974. In 2002, she enrolled at the National University of Colombia in Medellín, where she got a master's degree in science history and philosophy.

Her work is mainly linked to the Universidad de Antioquia, where she has been a teacher and researcher since the 1970s. Her areas of research have focused mainly on malaria and its treatment with Colombian traditional plants. In 1990 she founded the Malaria Group at the university, which was the first to report on cases of Plasmodium ovale (a rare species in Colombia) and human Babesiosis (disease transmitted by ticks).

Together with her research group, Silvia Blair travelled to different regions of Colombia such as the Pacific Coast, Urabá Antioqueño and the Bajo Cauca, to collect data on the plants used by locals to treat malaria. They reported species such as Solanum nudum and Austroeupatorium inulifolium as effective treatments for this disease.

== Awards and recognitions ==
- 1992 – "Héctor Abad Gómez" Medal for Merits in Public Health, by the Government of Antioquia.
- 1993 – Distinction to a teacher's work, by the University of Antioquia.
- 1998 – Honorable Mention for professional, scientific and research work, Asociación Médica Sindical de Colombia.
- 2000 – Honorable Mention in the area of Basic Experimental Sciences, by the National Academy of Medicine (Colombia).
- 2000 – Mention of Recognition for Research, by the School of Microbiology of the University of Antioquia.
- 2007 – Honorable Mention in Exact, Physical and Natural Sciences, by the Alejandro Ángel Escobar Foundation.
- 2008 – "Francisco José de Caldas" Medal for University Excellence, by the University of Antioquia.
- 2009 – Female Merit Medal for contributions to science, by the Alcaldía de Medellín (Town Hall).
- 2013 – Distinction to a life of dedication to research, by the Alcaldía de Medellín (Town Hall).
- 2016 – Emeritus researcher of Colciencias (Administrative Department for Science, Technology and Innovation)
- 2017 – Emeritus professor, University of Antioquia.

== Selected publications ==
=== Journal articles ===
Sources:

- Quintero J., Siqueira A., Tobón A., Blair S., Moreno A., Arévalo-Herrera M., Lacerda M., Valencia S. Malaria-related anaemia: A Latin American perspective. 2011. Memórias do Instituto Oswaldo Cruz; 106(1): 91–104. doi:10.1590/S0074-02762011000900012
- Blair-Trujillo, S., Lacharme-Lora, L., and Carmona-Fonseca, J. 1998. Resistance of Plasmodium falciparum to Antimalarial Drugs in Zaragoza (Antioquia, Colombia). Mem. Inst. Oswaldo Cruz [online]; 97(3): 401–406. doi:10.1590/S0074-02762002000300022
- Piñeros-Jiménez J.G., Álvarez G., Tobón A., Arboleda M., Carrero, S., Blair, S. 2011. Congenital malaria in Urabá, Colombia. Malaria Journal; 10, 239. doi:10.1186/1475-2875-10-239

=== Books ===
- 1991 – Plantas Antimaláricas, una revisión bibliográfica. ISBN 958-655-056-7.
- 2005 – Plantas Antimaláricas de la Costa Pacífica Colombiana. ISBN 9586558037.

=== Book chapters ===
- 1997 – Búsqueda de antimaláricos a partir de plantas medicinales.
- 1999 – Resistencia a los antimaláricos.
- 2008 – Malaria Gestacional, Obstetricia y Ginecología..
- 2014 – Malaria, Enfermedades Infecciosas de Homo sapiens. ISBN 9789588843155.
- 2014 – Babesia spp, Enfermedades Infecciosas de Homo sapiens. ISBN 9789588843155.
