= Jorge Reynolds Pombo =

Colombian engineer

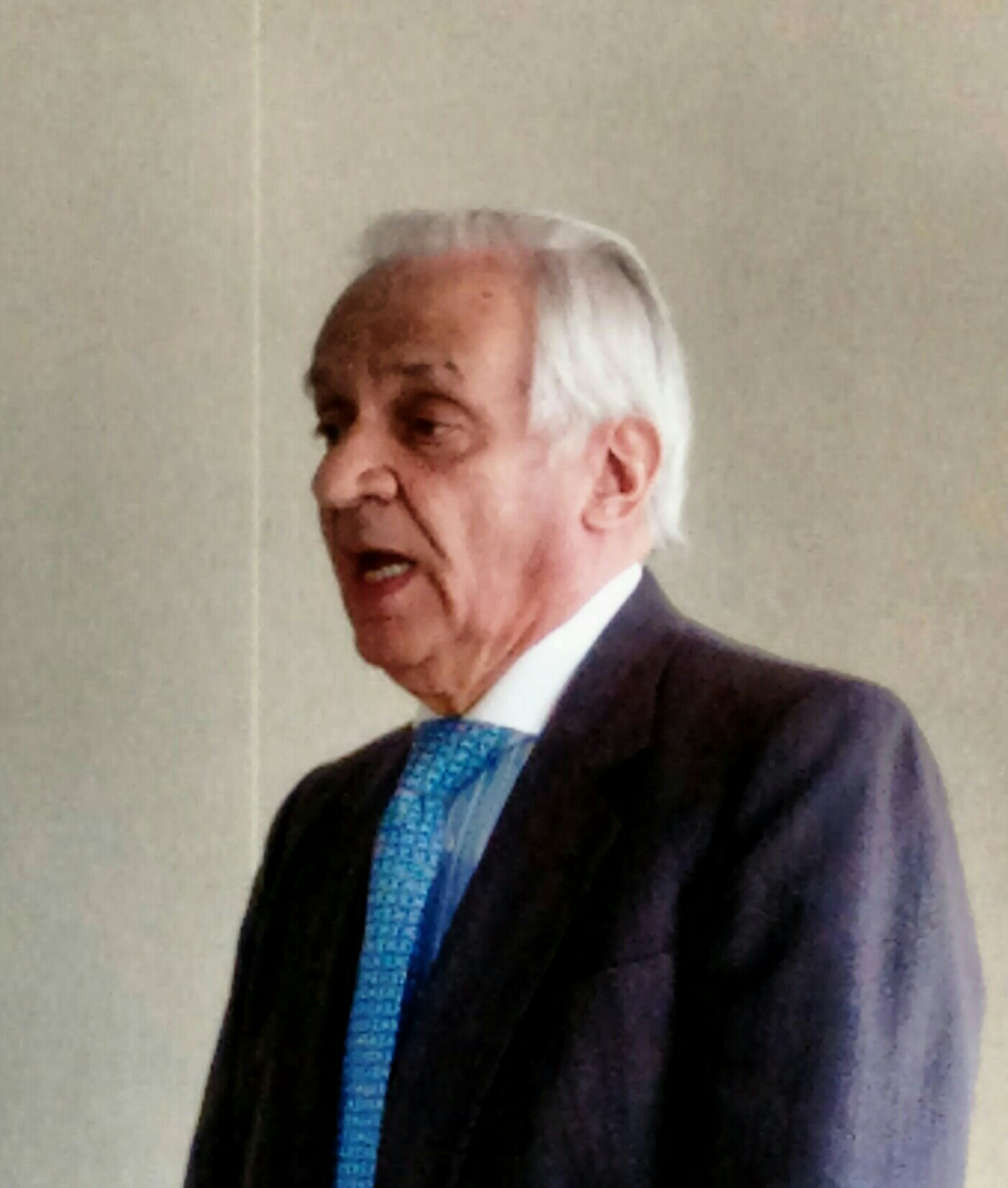
- Born: June 22, 1936 (age 89); Colombia
- Education: Trinity College (Cambridge)

Jorge Reynolds Pombo is an electrical and bio- engineer born in Bogotá, Colombia on June 22, 1936. He is known for contributing to the invention of the pacemaker, being one of the first doctors in Latin America to make a significant contribution to the medical field. In 1957, Earl Bakken of Minneapolis, Minnesota, produced the first wearable external pacemaker for a pediatric patient of C. Walton Lillehei. The Swede Rune Elmqvist (1906-1996) developed the first internally implanted pacemaker in 1958. During this time, Reynolds Pombo had designed and built an external pacemaker powered by a 12-volt battery. It was connected to a patient in December 1958.

== Studies and research ==
During his school years, he studied in Bogotá, Colombia. He attended Trinity College at Cambridge, England. Reynolds obtained an undergraduate degree in electronic engineering.

Since 1991 there have been six underwater acoustic research cruises to study the heart of whales, using submarines provided by the Navy of Colombia as a platform for acoustic studies of whales, with the support of some Navy ships to facilitate investigative work. In his research he has found that the heart of cetaceans and humans are similar and so for more than thirty years he has been studying these animals and then applying the results to humans.

In August 2011, he announced the launch of a pacemaker as small as one-third of a grain of rice, which does not need a battery. Such pacemakers may be seen by cardiologists "from anywhere in the world", he said in the IV Inventors and High Technology Hall in Medellín.

== Awards and achievements ==
Reynolds has received three honorary doctorates in medicine, for his contributions to research and development of technologies for cardiology. Also, add more than 70 productions including documentaries, short, and full-length films made with the help of important scientific channels like National Geographic, and Discovery Channel, among others.

He is a member of at least 34 scientific societies in Colombia and abroad, some of them as an honorary member. He is a member of the Academy of Sciences in New York since 1989, the Colombian Academy of Exact, Physical and Natural Sciences since 1989, and also an Associate Member of the National Academy of Medicine since 2004. He is also a founding member of several scientific societies.

== Books ==
- Voyage to the Heart of Whales (1998)
