= Federación Campesina del Cauca =

The Federación Campesina del Cauca is a non-profit, member-owned federation of coffee grower associations based in the Cauca Department of Colombia. It was found in 1971 as a congress of farmers, but has since formalized into a cooperative serving the interests of 630 coffee farmers from six local sub-groups. The federation was licensed FLO Cert in 2004, and has since acquired certification for producing both conventional and organic coffee.

Its mission is "to work in programs and projects so as to provide the necessary services to strengthen its affiliates, improve entrepreneurial and administrative efficiency in order to seek altogether the improvement of social, economic, cultural and living conditions of all coffee producing families".

== Mission ==
FCC works to provide comprehensive institutional capacity and the necessary services to strengthen their six grass-roots agricultural organizations, whose collaboration leads to the improvement of social, economic, cultural, and environmental conditions associated farming families.

== Vision ==
FCC is dedicated to be an organization of socially-minded coffee farmers generating sustainable agricultural development so that they can live with dignity in their fields.

== Impact ==
=== For coffee growers from Fair Trade certification ===
Fair trade certification guarantees farmers a minimum price on their coffee production and links FCC directly with importers, thus creating a more reliable market. Through Fair Trade certification, farmers earn more substantial incomes, thus enabling them to hold on to their land and invest in crop quality.

=== Institutional impact from international recognition ===
With Fairtrade premium resources, the FCC has established a series of several funds:

- A revolving fund for micro-credits that allow their partners to invest in the cultivation and increase productivity of the plots (renovation or maintenance of their coffee fields), improve coffee-processing infrastructure and therein the quality of the product establish sustenance crops in complementary areas of coffee production with the objective of improving household incomes.
- A commercial fund as working capital for the purchase of coffee from local producers.
- An investment fund for the purchase of arable land for cultivation the construction of warehouses and offices for the grassroots organizations improved wet and dry coffee-processing infrastructure for certified coffee producers.
- Training for producers on leadership and the qualifications of the fair trade process.

In an attempt to improve the quality of the region's coffee production, all individual investments are accompanied by technical support services, the development and transfer of appropriate technologies,

=== Environmental ===
FCC contributes to the conservation of the environment through the promotion of clean farming practices and especially with the ecologically-sound management and processing of coffee production. Specifically, FCC goes to great lengths in waste management, residual water treatment and the exclusive use of organic fertilizers.

== Farmer representation ==
The FCC is formed by six grassroots coffee grower organizations in the southwest regions of Colombia:

- Piendamó Agricultural Association
- The Peasant Association for Clean Agriculture of Morales
- Cajibío Agricultural Association
- Popayan Agricultural Association
- Timbío Agricultural Association
- Rosas Agricultural Association
