= Domingo (name) =

Domingo is a Spanish name based on Latin Dominicus meaning 'of the lord'. Related names include Dominic, Domingos, Domingues, and Domínguez.

Notable people named Domingo include:

== People with the given name ==
- Domingo Alzugaray (1932–2017), Argentine-born Brazilian actor and journalist
- Domingo Amaizón (born 1936), Argentine middle-distance runner
- Domingo Amestoy (1822–1892), Basque sheepherder, and banker
- Domingo Andrés (1525–1599), Spanish humanist, writer and poet
- Domingo Antonio Ortiz (1832–1889), Paraguayan naval officer and judge
- Domingo Arenas (1888–1918), Mexican revolutionary
- Domingo Báñez (1528–1604), Spanish Dominican and Scholastic theologian
- Domingo Barrera (born 1943), Spanish boxer
- Domingo Barret, governor of Yucatán, Mexico
- Domingo Blanco (born 1995), Argentine footballer
- Domingo Bordaberry (1889–1952), Uruguayan lawyer and political figure
- Domingo Bryant (born 1963), American football player
- Domingo Casco (born 1948), Argentine boxer
- Domingo Castillejo (1744–1793), Spanish botanist, surgeon, and professor
- Domingo Caycedo (1783–1843), Colombian statesman
- Domingo Chalá (born 1945–6), Colombian singer and gravedigger
- Domingo Cirici Ventalló (1878–1917), a Spanish novelist, editor and political militant
- Domingo Cisma (born 1982), Spanish footballer
- Domingo Colín (born 1952), Mexican racewalker
- Domingo Cordero (born 1965), Puerto Rican track and field athlete
- Domingo Cruz (1864–1934),19th-century Puerto Rican musician and director
- Domingo Cullen (1791–1839), governor of province of Santa Fe, Argentina, during 1838
- Domingo Damigella (born 1968), former featherweight boxer from Argentine
- Domingo Deluana (died 2000), marine of the Philippine Marine Corps
- Domingo Dominguín (1895–1958), Spanish bullfighter
- Domingo Drummond (1957–2002), Honduran footballer
- Domingo Elías (1805–1867), interim President of Peru in 1844
- Domingo Emanuelli, Puerto Rican lawyer and politician
- Domingo Federico (1916–2000), Argentine bandoneon player, songwriter, and actor
- Domingo García (fencer) (1895–?), Spanish fencer
- Domingo García (footballer) (1904–?), Peruvian football midfielder
- Domingo García (politician), Texas politician
- Domingo Ghirardelli (1817–1894), Italian-American chocolatier
- Domingo González (1947–1979), Colombian footballer
- Domingo Gribeo (1558–1649), Spanish military man
- Domingo Hindoyan (born 1980), Venezuelan-Swiss conductor
- Domingo Hospital (born 1958), Spanish professional golfer
- Domingo Itchon (1924–2004), Filipino business executive
- Domingo Iturrate Zubero (1901–1927), a Spanish Roman Catholic priest
- Domingo Kamonga (born 1974), Namibian rugby lock
- Domingo Laíno (born 1935), Paraguayan politician, economist, and activist
- Domingo G. Landicho (1939–2021), Philippine writer and academic
- Domingo Larrainzar (born 1969), Spanish retired footballer
- Domingo Lejona (born 1938), Argentine former footballer
- Domingo Leyba (born 1995), Dominican baseball infielder
- Domingo Lorenzo (1928–2009), Dominican sports shooter
- Domingo Matheu (1766–1831), former Argentinian president
- Domingo Melín (died 1880), Mapuche chief
- Domingo Ortiz (born 1952), American musician
- Domingo F. Periconi (1883–?), artist
- Domingo Ramón (born 1958), Spanish long-distance runner
- Domingo Rivero (1852–1929), Spanish poet
- Domingo Francisco Sánchez (1795–1870), Vice President of Paraguay
- Domingo Santana (born 1992), Dominican professional baseball player
- Domingo Faustino Sarmiento (1811–1888), former Argentinian president)
- Domingo Tapia (born 1991), Dominican professional baseball player

== People with the surname ==
- Adelita Domingo (1930–2012), Spanish dancer, songwriter, concert pianist, teacher
- Alberto Domingo, Spanish engineer
- Alejandro Santo Domingo (born 1977), Colombian-American financier and philanthropist
- Amalia Domingo Soler (1835–1909), Spanish writer
- Andrea D. Domingo (born 1949), Filipino politician and chief executive officer
- Anni Domingo (born 1950s), British actress, director and writer
- Baldwin Domingo (1926–2020), American politician
- Charles Domingo (1875–1950)
- Cogie Domingo (born 1985), Filipino actor and model
- Colman Domingo (born 1969), American actor, writer and director
- David Fernández Domingo (born 1977), Spanish former cyclist
- Eugene Domingo (born 1971), Filipino actress
- José L. Domingo (born 1951), Spanish toxicologist
- Kim Domingo (born 1995), Filipino actress, model and TV host
- Marta Domingo (born 1935), Mexican soprano and opera director
- Pascale Domingo, French aerothermochemist
- Pedro Durruti Domingo (1911–1937), Spanish Falangist activist
- Plácido Domingo (born 1941), Spanish opera singer and conductor
- Robi Domingo (born 1989), Filipino actor, dancer, and host
- Sareeta Domingo (1980–2025), British author, editor and publisher
- Thomas Domingo (born 1985), French rugby union player
- Wilfred Adolphus Domingo (1889–1968), Jamaican activist and journalist

== Other people with the name ==
- Domingo (producer) (born 1970), American hip-hop producer
- Saint Dominic (Domingo Félix de Guzmán; 1170–1221), Castilian Catholic priest, founder of the Friars popularly called the Dominicans
- Juan Domingo Perón (1895–1974), 41st President of Argentina

== Fictional characters ==
- Domingo (Saturday Night Live), a former-recurring sketch on Saturday Night Live
- Domingo Gallardo "Krazy-8" Molina, a character from Breaking Bad and Better Call Saul

== See also ==
- Domingos (name)
- Domingo (disambiguation)
- Txomin
