= Txomin =

Txomin is a Basque translation of the name Dominic.

== People with the name ==
- Txomin Acedo (1898–1980), Spanish footballer
- Txomin Artola, of the band Haizea
- Txomin Juaristi (born 1995), Spanish cyclist
- Txomin Larrainzar (born 1969), Spanish footballer
- Txomin Nagore (born 1974), Spanish footballer
- Txomin Peillen (1932–2022), French writer, linguist, and biologist
- Txomin Perurena (1943–2023), Spanish cyclist

== Fictional characters ==
- Txomin, in the video game Aidyn Chronicles: The First Mage

== See also ==
- Domingo (name)
