= Buenaventura Salesa =

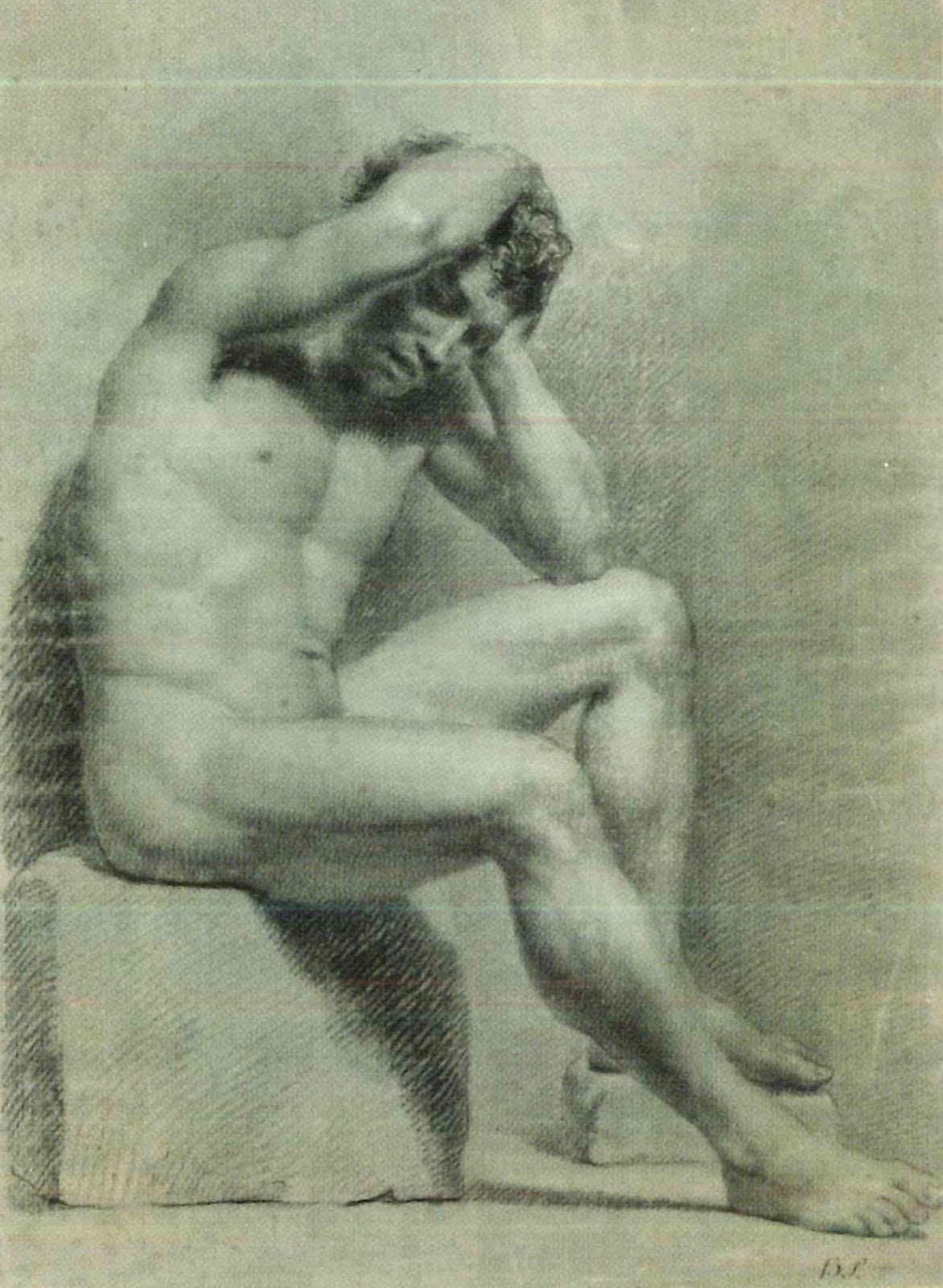
Classical nude

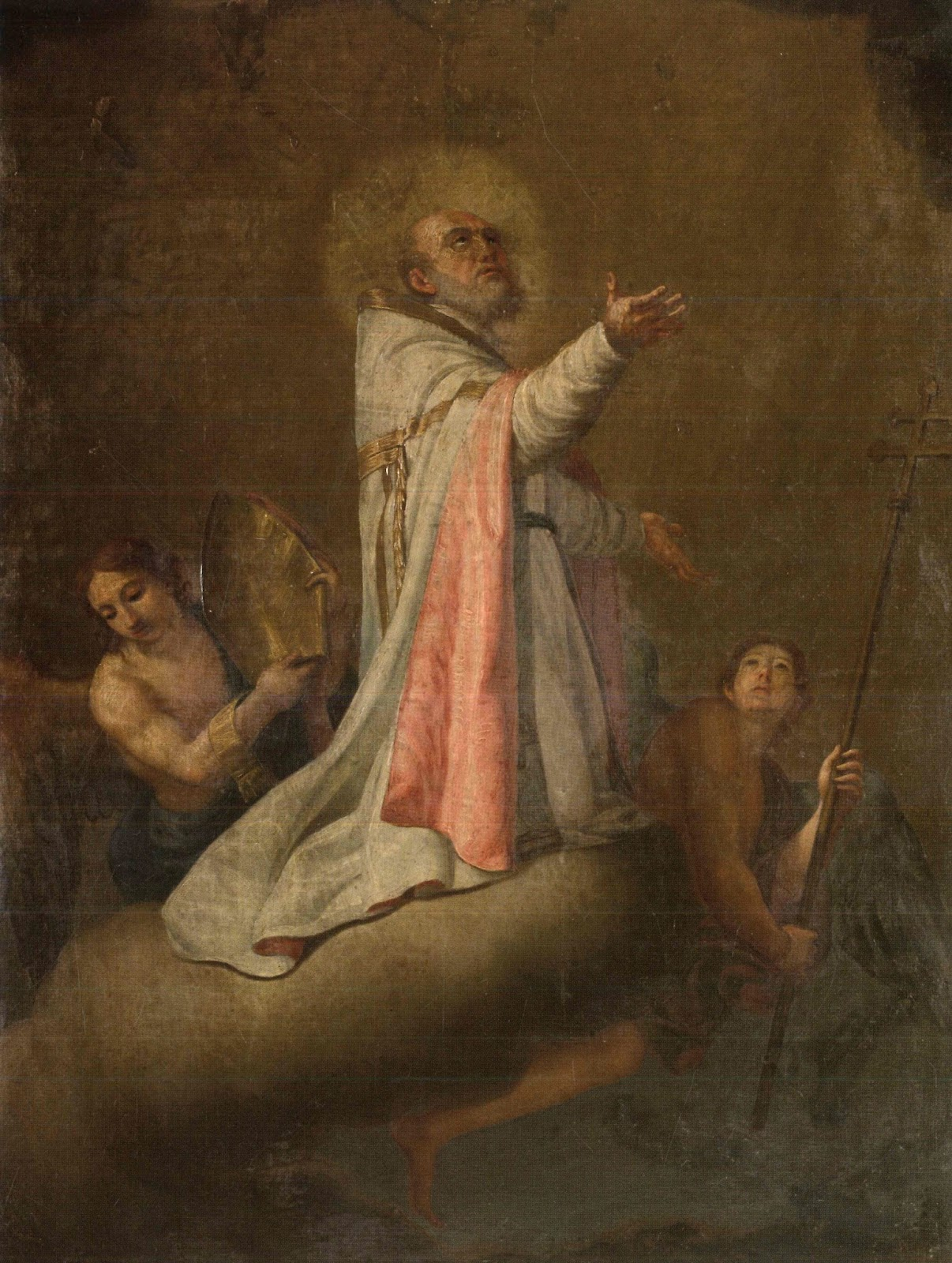
San Juan de Ribera

Buenaventura Salesa (1755, Borja - 21 October 1819, Zaragoza) was a Spanish graphic artist and painter in the Neo-Classical style.

== Biography ==
He studied with Francisco Bayeu and, from 1770, attended the Real Academia de Bellas Artes de San Fernando; living with the sculptor, Juan Pascual de Mena. In 1772, he was awarded the Academia's third-class prize for his drawings of the Farnese Hercules and the Apollino. Four years later, upon the recommendation of Anton Raphael Mengs, King Carlos III awarded him a scholarship to study in Rome.

In Rome, he enjoyed the patronage of Ambassador José Nicolás de Azara, a good friend of Mengs, who was especially impressed by his drawings. Many were included in Azara's translation of The Life of Cicero (La Historia de la vida de Marco Tulio Cicerón), by Conyers Middleton, published in 1790. He was also involved in a project to create engravings of the paintings in Europe's royal palaces, to which he contributed a drawing of one by Mengs, in the Palacio Real de Madrid, depicting the Descent from the Cross. The engraving itself was the work of Giovanni Volpato. Later, he produced drawings for the series, Portraits of Illustrious Spaniards, issued by the Royal Press and sponsored by the Count of Floridablanca. These included Martín de Azpilicueta, engraved by Manuel Salvador Carmona, and Antonio de Leyva, from a painting attributed to Leonardo da Vinci, engraved by Bartolomé Vázquez.

Azara was also instrumental in obtaining employment for him at the church of Nostra Signora del Sacro Cuore, where he and several other painters did decorative work, and a commission for artworks to celebrate the beatification of Andrés Hibernón Real. From 1790 to 1798, Salesa was Director of the evening drawing classes that Azara had established at Monaldeschi Palace. In 1798, following the establishment of the "Roman Reoublic", he accompanied Azara on his return to Spain.

A year later, he was sworn in as court painter at the Royal Palace of La Granja de San Ildefonso. He established himself inn Zaragoza, where he was named Director of Painting at the Real Academia de Nobles y Bellas Artes de San Luis, a position he held until his death. During his final years, he was best known for an Annunciation at the church of Santa María la Mayor in Alcañiz, and three portraits: Archbishop Agustín de Lezo y Palomeque, the merchant Juan Martín de Goicoechea (1732-1806), a close friend of Goya, and the Bishop of Valladolid, Juan Antonio Hernández Pérez de Larrea, who was also a botanist and a member of the Sociedad Económica Aragonesa.

He had two sons, Gaspar and Ignacio, who both became painters, but very little is known about them.
