= Domingues (surname) =

Domingues is a Portuguese surname. Its Spanish variant is Domínguez. Notable people with the surname include:

- Adauto Domingues (born 1961), Brazilian middle-distance runner
- Adelina Domingues (1888–2002), American supercentenarian
- Altino Domingues (born 1951), Portuguese-American football player
- Amy Domingues, American cellist and viola da gamba player
- Diana Domingues (1947–2025), Brazilian artist and art historian
- Ivan Domingues (born 2006), Portuguese racing driver
- João Domingues (born 1993), Portuguese tennis player
- Leandro Domingues (1983–2025), Brazilian footballer
- Maurício Rodrigues Alves Domingues (born 1978), Brazilian football player
- Nicholas Domingues (born 1992), South African Roller hockey player
- Rachel Domingues (born 2006), Canadian-Portuguese actor
- Renan Cardoso Domingues (born 1988), Brazilian football player

== See also ==
- Domingues (born 1983), Mozambican footballer
