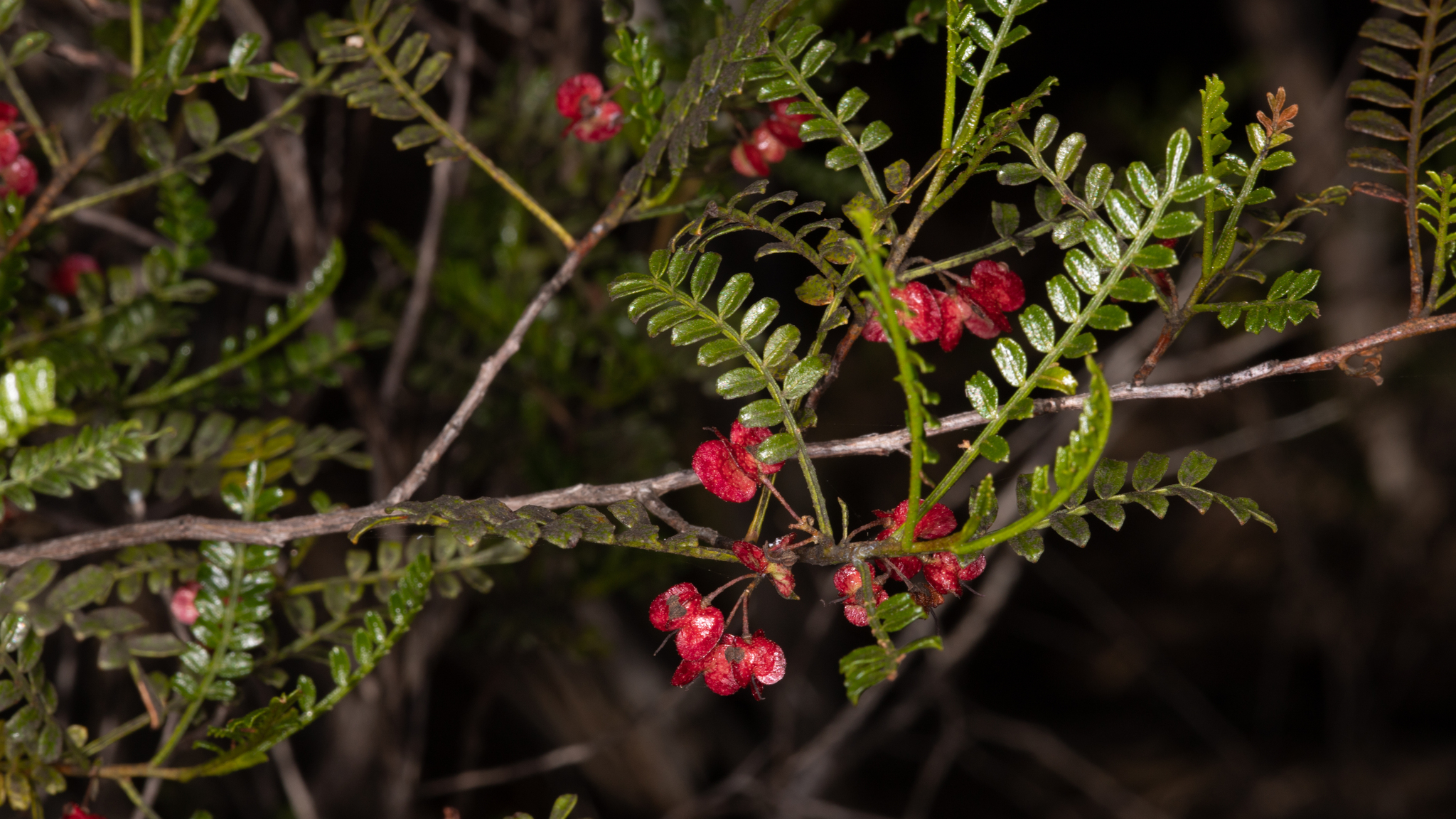
- In Kalbarri National Park

Scientific classification
- Kingdom: Plantae
- Clade: Tracheophytes
- Clade: Angiosperms
- Clade: Eudicots
- Clade: Rosids
- Order: Sapindales
- Family: Sapindaceae
- Genus: Dodonaea
- Species: D. larreoides

Binomial name
- Dodonaea larreoides Turcz.

Synonyms
- Dodonaea foliolosa F.Muell.; Dodonaea larraeoides Turcz. orth. var.; Dodonaea multijuga F.Muell. nom. illeg.

= Dodonaea larreoides =

Species of shrub

Dodonaea larreoides is a species of plant in the family Sapindaceae and is endemic to the south-west of Western Australia. It is an erect shrub with imparipinnate leaves with 17 to 31 oblong to egg-shaped leaflets, flowers arranged in cymes in leaf axils and usually three-winged capsules.

== Description ==
Dodonaea larreoides is an erect, dioecious shrub that typically grows to a height of up to 4 m (13 ft). Its leaves are imparipinnate, 25–50 mm (0.98–1.97 in) long with 17 to 31 oblong to egg-shaped leaflets, the narrower end towards the base, 5–7 mm (0.20–0.28 in) long and 2–3 mm (0.079–0.118 in) wide. The flowers are borne in small cymes in leaf axils, each flower on a pedicel 7–10 mm (0.28–0.39 in) long with three or four egg-shaped sepals 2.3–2.4 mm (0.091–0.094 in) long, that sometimes fall off as the flowers open. The fruit is a glabrous, three-winged or four-winged capsule, 6.5–9 mm (0.26–0.35 in) long and 10–13 mm (0.39–0.51 in) wide, the wings 3–4 mm (0.12–0.16 in) wide.

== Taxonomy and naming ==
Dodonaea larreoides was first formally described in 1858 by Nikolai Turczaninow in the Bulletin de la Société impériale des naturalistes de Moscou from specimens collected by James Drummond. The specific epithet (larreoides) means 'Larrea-like'.

== Distribution and habitat ==
This species of Dodonaea grows in sandy or calcareous loam or laterite in semi-arid malle scrub and woodlands between Ajana to Cunderdin in the Avon Wheatbelt and Geraldton Sandplains bioregions of south-western Western Australia.

== Conservation status ==
Dodonaea larreoides is listed as "not threatened" by the Government of Western Australia Department of Biodiversity, Conservation and Attractions.
