= Valentín Carderera =

Spanish painter (1796–1880)

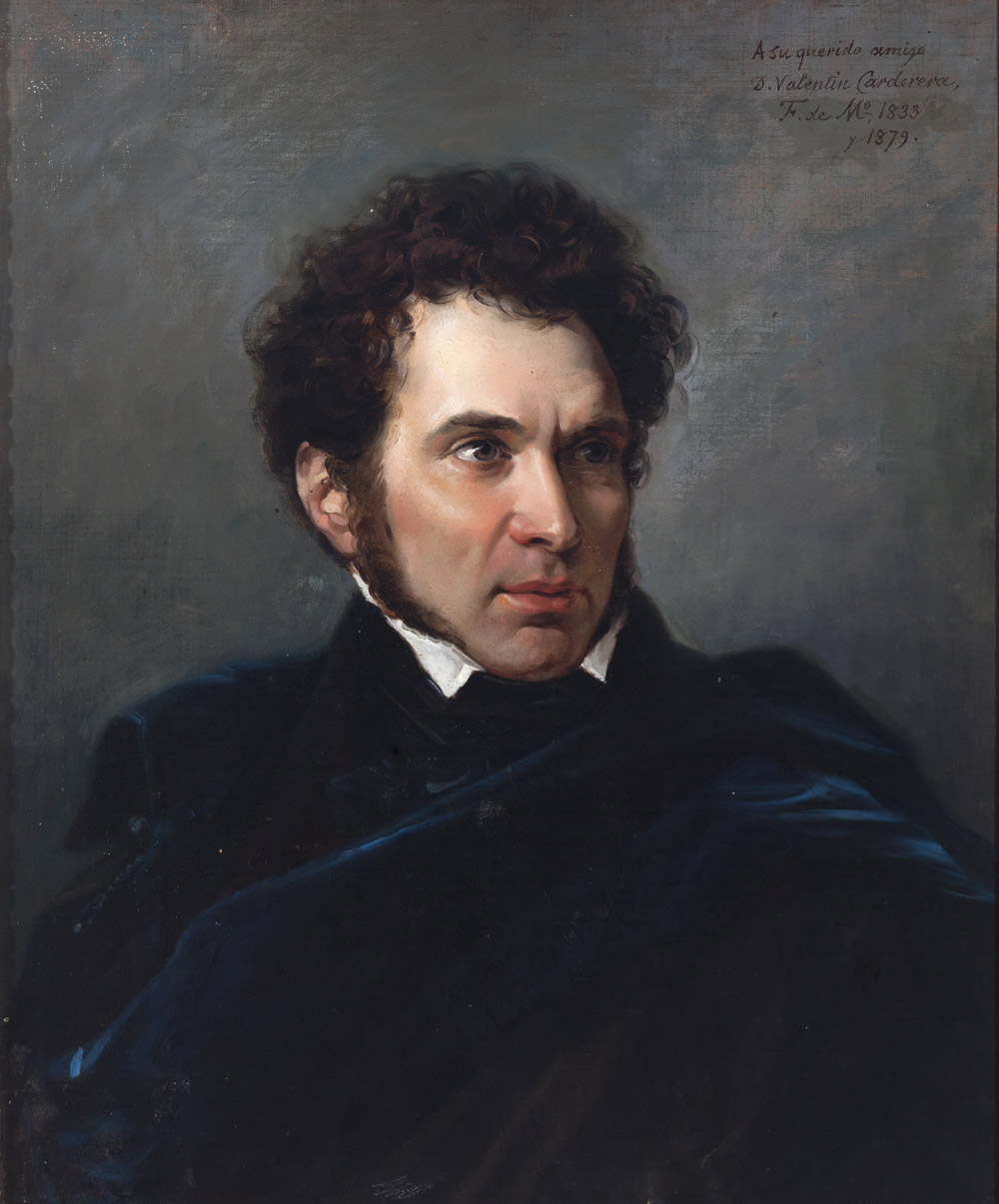
Valentín Carderera; portrait by Federico de Madrazo

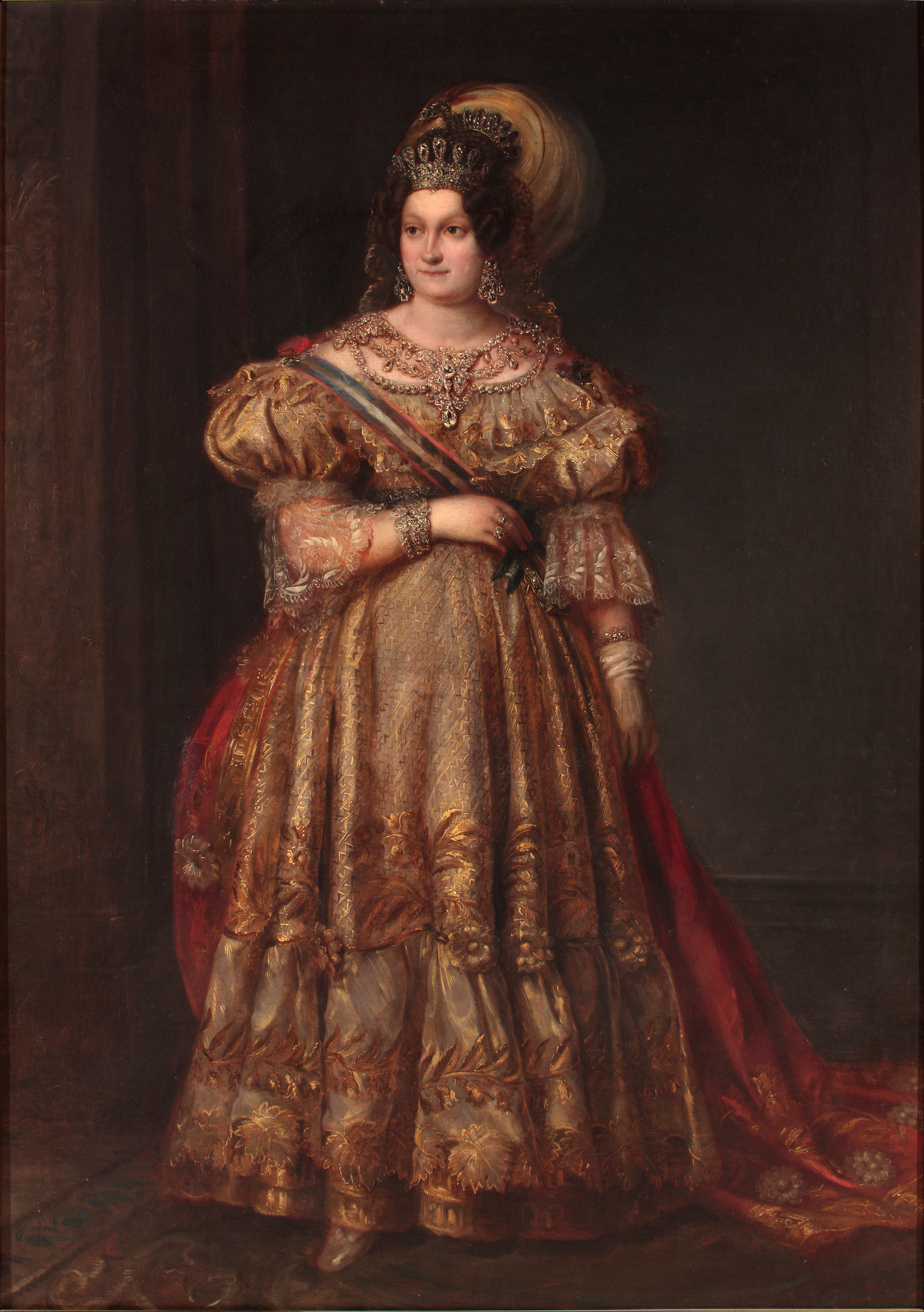
Portrait of Queen Consort Maria Christina (1831)

Valentín Carderera y Solano (14 February 1796, Huesca - 25 March 1880, Madrid) was a Spanish painter, erudite scholar and collector. He was named honorary court painter during the reign of Isabel II.

== Biography ==
He attended the Universidad Sertoriana de Huesca, where he studied philosophy then, thanks to the patronage of José de Palafox, studied drawing in Zaragoza with Buenaventura Salesa and painting in Madrid in the Royal Academy of Arts, where his teachers were Mariano Salvador Maella and José de Madrazo. In 1822, he won a grant to study in Rome, awarded by José António, Duke of Villahermosa. He remained in Italy until 1831, travelling widely and creating sketches and watercolors.

Back in Spain, in 1836, he received a commission to make an inventory of the nationalised works of art from suppressed monasteries in Castile. From 1838, he was a governing member of the board at the Museo Real de Pintura y Escultura. He was also a member of the Real Academia de Bellas Artes de San Fernando, where he taught art history and, from 1843, he held a chair at the Real Academia de la Historia. In 1873, he helped establish the Museo de Huesca by donating paintings from his own collection.

His most familiar works are portraits of famous Spaniards throughout history; gathered together in a large anthology called Iconografía Española (1855, enlarged in 1864), which constitutes his magnum opus. In order to defray the costs of publication, he had to sell his collection of drawings and prints to the Biblioteca Nacional.

As a writer, he also contributed regular essays on cultural subjects to El Artista, Semanario Pintoresco Español, El Museo Universal and the French Gazette des Beaux-Arts. In 1866, he edited the first edition of the Discursos practicables del nobilísimo arte de la pintura, written in 1675 by Jusepe Martínez.

As a collector, he was particularly fond of the drawings and engravings of Francisco de Goya and owned a large collection of them. In 1835, he wrote the first substantial biography of Goya, which was published in El Artista.

== Writings ==
- Catálogo y descripción sumaria de retratos antiguos... coleccionados por D. Valentin Carderera y Solano, M. Tello, 1877.
- Iconografía española : Colección de retratos, estaluas, mausoleos y demás monumentos inéditos de reyes, reinas, grandes capitanes, escritores, etc. desde el siglo XI hasta el XVII, copiados de los originales por... Valentin Carderera y Solano... con texto biográfico y descriptivo, en español y francés, in two volumes, R. Campuzano, 1855–1864.
- Informe sobre los retratos de Cristobal Colon, su trage y escudo de armas. Leído á la real Academia de la historia, por su autor Don Valentin Carderera. Imprenta de la Real Academia de la Historia, 1851 Full text online @ Google Books.
