= Diana Domingues =

Brazilian artist and art historian (1947–2025)

- Born: Diana Maria Gallicchio Domingues; 1947; Paim Filho, Brazil
- Died: 5 June 2025 (aged 77–78); Porto Alegre, Brazil
- Education: School of Communications and Arts, University of São Paulo; Pontifical Catholic University of São Paulo
- Occupations: Artist; Art historian

Diana Maria Gallicchio Domingues (1947 – 5 June 2025) was a Brazilian artist and art historian.

== Biography ==
Born in Paim Filho in 1947, Domingues earned a master's degree from the School of Communications and Arts, University of São Paulo and a doctorate from the Pontifical Catholic University of São Paulo. Following her doctoral dissertation, she presented an interactive multimedia installation at the São Paulo Art Biennial. In 1999, she was elected one of the 30 personalities of Caxias do Sul by a poll of students at the school of journalism at the University of Caxias do Sul. In 2002, she published the riação e Interatividade na Ciberarte, which focused on the brain's processing of videos and images, the creative process, and the functioning of the mind, mathematics, computing, organic systems, and artificial intelligence. She also coordinated a research group on new technologies in the visual arts at the University of Caxias do Sul.

Domingues died in Porto Alegre on 5 June 2025.

== Publications ==
- Eletrourbs, Eletrogravuras (1982)
- Connexio: uma vida óptico-eletrônica para as imagens (1990)
- Diana Domingues - XXI Bienal Internacional de São Paulo (1991)
- Arte Tecnologia: A arte no século XXI: a humanização das tecnologias (1995)
- Trans-e: o corpo e as tecnologias (1995)
- A Arte no Século XXI: a humanização das tecnologias (1997)
- Trans-e: my body, my blood. Interactive Installation of the Diana Domingues (1997–2000)
- II Bienal de Artes Visuais do Mercosul. Julio Le Parc e Arte e Tecnologia (1999)
- Catalogue Eletronic Art Exhibition. 13th SIBGRAPI 2000. Brazilian Symposium on Computer Graphics and Image Processing. (2000)
- INS(H)NAK(R)ES. Ciberinstalação, Evento robótico interativo e Teleperformance de Diana Domingues (2001)
- Arte e Vida no Século XXI: Tecnologia, ciência e criatividade (2003)
- Criação de poéticas digitalais (2005)
