= Quintanar de la Orden =

- Municipality
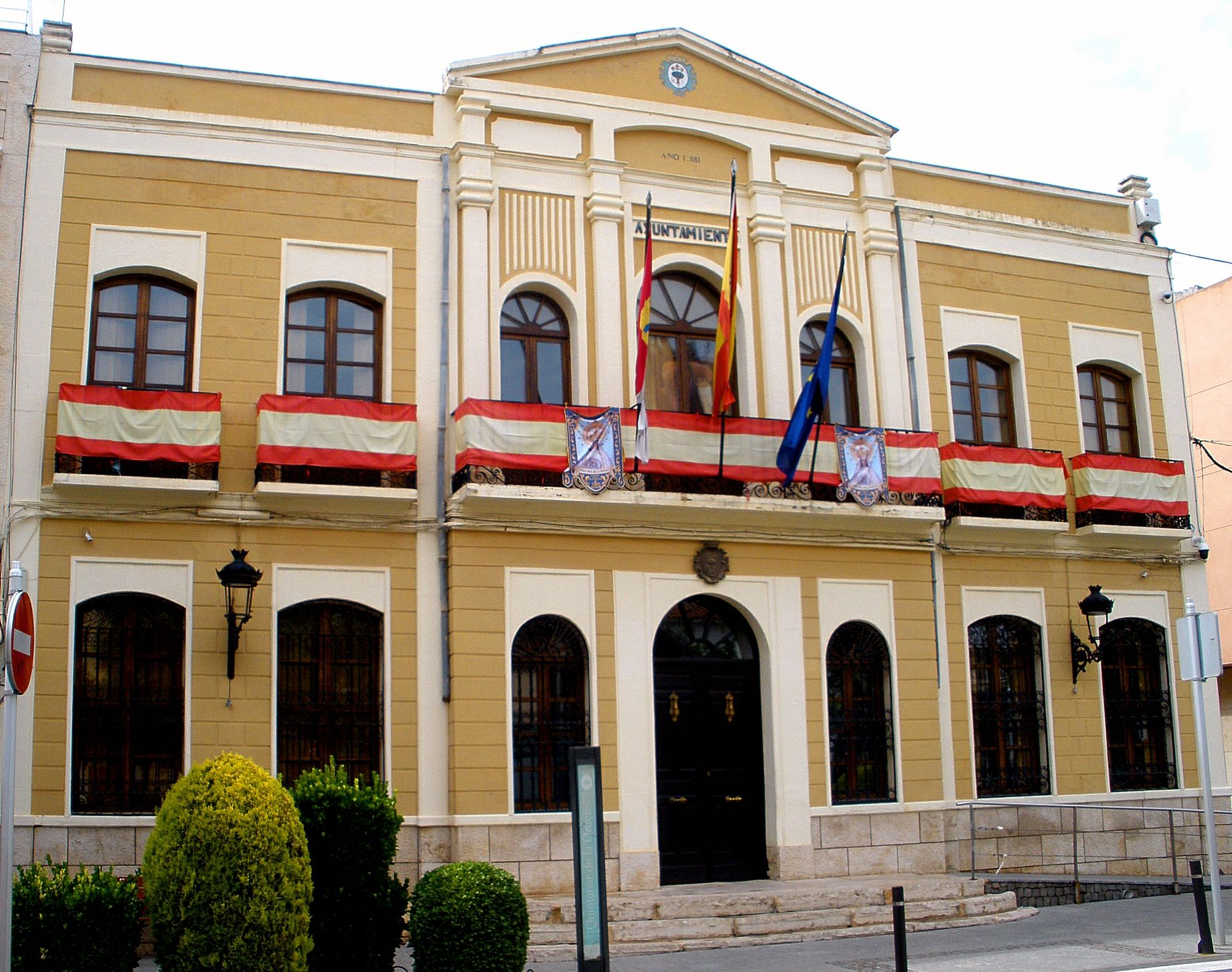
- Town hall

- Coat of arms

- Location in Spain Quintanar de la Orden (Spain)
- Coordinates: 39°35′26″N 3°2′34″W
- Country: Spain
- Autonomous community: Castilla–La Mancha
- Province: Toledo

Area
  - Total: 87.87 km^{2} (33.93 sq mi)
- Elevation: 691 m (2,267 ft)

Population (2025-01-01)
  - Total: 11,355
  - Density: 129.2/km^{2} (334.7/sq mi)
- Time zone: UTC+1 (CET)
  - Summer (DST): UTC+2 (CEST)
- Website: quintanardelaorden.es

Quintanar de la Orden is a municipality of Spain located in the province of Toledo, Castilla–La Mancha. The municipality spans across a total area of 87.87 km^{2} and, as of 1 January 2023, the municipality has a registered population of 11,119. It is part of the Mancha Alta de Toledo comarca.

== Name ==
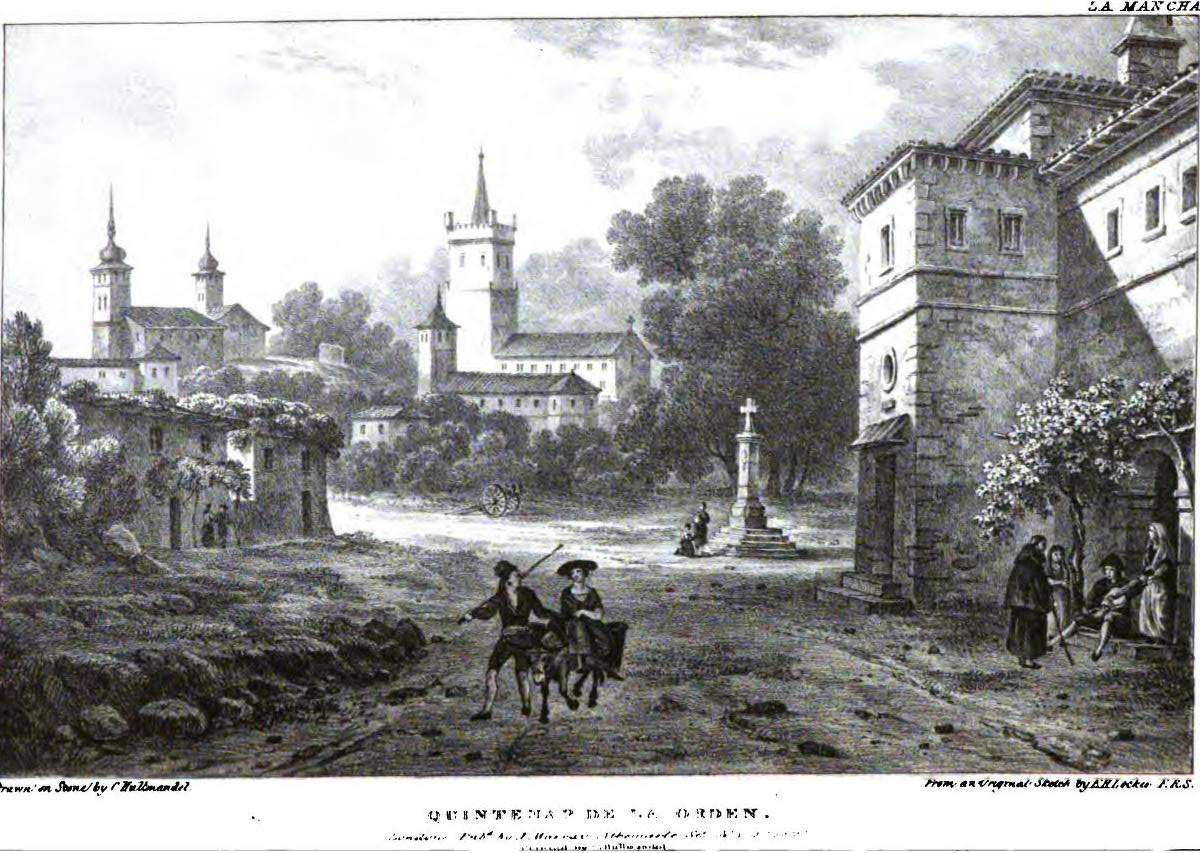
Quintanar de la Orden in 1824 by Edward Hawke Locker

The term "Quintanar" derives from the Latin Quintana meaning 'one fifth' which may relate to the portion of the harvest of the tenants (or its monetary equivalent) which had to be paid as tax or rent at the market where they sold food. It could also be related to the distance, of five miles from a particular Roman communications center. The term "Order" is a reference to the Order of Santiago.

Before the "de la Orden" moniker, Quintanar was known as "Quintanar de la Encina".

== Geography ==
The municipality borders the towns of Mota del Cuervo in the Province of Cuenca and Villanueva de Alcardete, El Toboso, Miguel Esteban and La Puebla de Almoradiel in the Province of Toledo .

== History ==
The discovery Paleolithic may indicate the presence a prehistoric settlement. Roman coins indicate the existence of some sort of installation here at that time.

Quintanar was one of the villages of La Mancha whose repopulation was tasked to the Order of Santiago. The early settlers possibly were Mozarabs from Toledo. Quintanar was granted a chartae populationis during the reign of Ferdinand III. Some Jews installed in Quintanar following their expulsion from Andalusia in 1443.

Autochthonous crypto-Jews were found in the town between 1588 and 1592. Moriscos were also reported in the town between 1570 and 1597, accounting for 235 in 1603.

== Notable people ==
- Leopolda Gassó y Vidal (1849–1885), writer, painter, essayist, and women's rights activist
