= Leopolda Gassó y Vidal =

Spanish writer and painter (1851–1885)

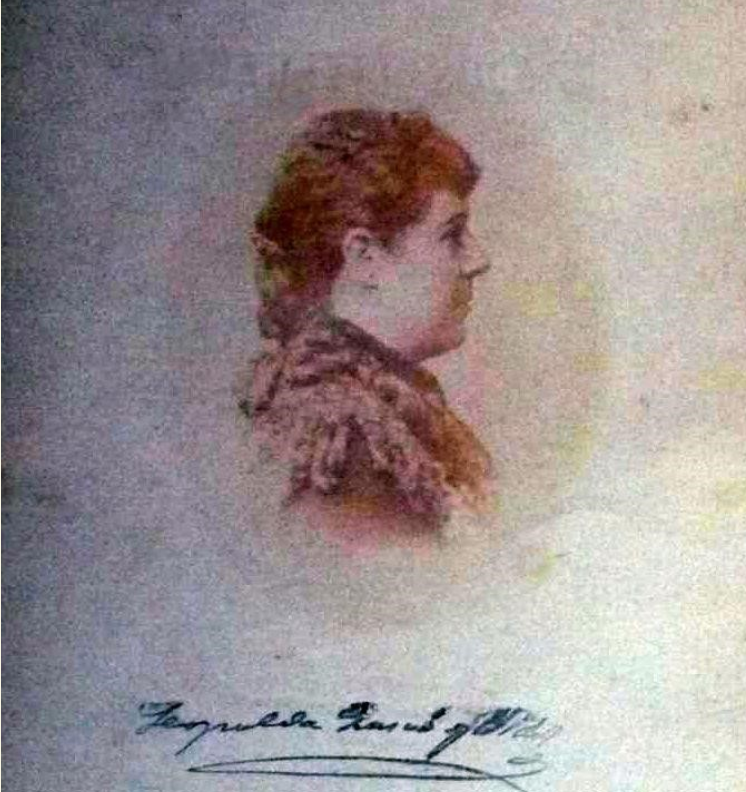
- Born: 5 November 1849; Quintanar de la Orden, Province of Toledo, Spain
- Died: 1885 (aged 35–36); Chamberí, Madrid, Spain
- Occupations: painter; writer; women's rights activist

Leopolda Gassó y Vidal (1849–1885) was a 19th-century Spanish writer, painter, essayist, and women's rights activist. Fluent in French and Italian, she was also a translator.

== Early life and education ==
Leopolda Gassó y Vidal was born in Quintanar de la Orden, Province of Toledo, on 5 November 1849, although some sources indicate 1848 or 1851. She was the only child of the marriage between the Catalan physician Joaquín Gassó and his wife Dionisia Vidal. Her family was wealthy and held liberal and progressive views.

Shortly after Leopolda's birth, her family moved to Toledo, where she would spend her entire childhood and most of her adolescence. At just eight years of age, she demonstrated a talent for painting, captivating her parents, who decided to support her in pursuing her passion. As a student of the painters Manuel Martínez Ferrer and Isidoro Lozano, she began her painting studies in Madrid at the age of 20.

== Career ==
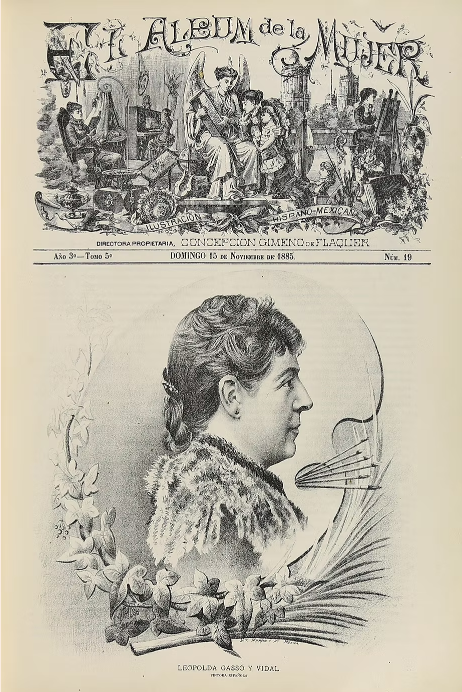
Front page of the illustrated newspaper El Álbum de la Mujer: Periódico Ilustrado, Mexico, November 15, 1885.

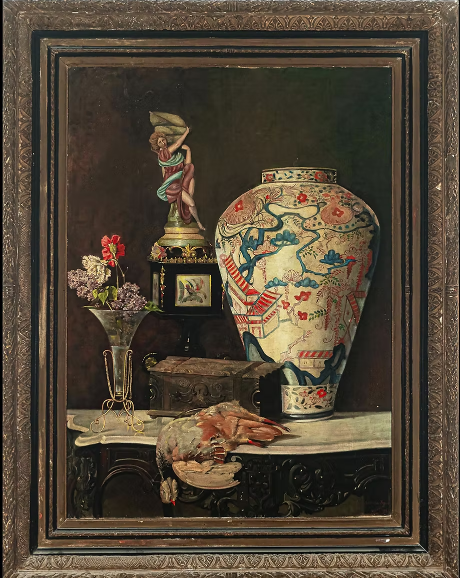
Bodegón (Still life). Madrid, 1879. Oil on canvas, 85 x 61.5 cm.

However, before moving to the Spanish capital, Gasso remained in Toledo, captivated by its beauty and going out to sketch from life with one of her friends. In fact, such was the affront and rejection of women painting or studying that they had to pose as French tourists (as a synonym for foreigners) to avoid being noticed. Toledo would become the city that would capture all of Gasso's attention, both in her writings and paintings, as well as in her thinking, thus shaping her personal and artistic evolution.

In Madrid, she began writing articles for magazines aimed at a predominantly female audience. She contributed to El Oriente de Asturias in Llanes, the Almanaque de El Orden, La Ilustración Española y Americana, and even the Boletín-Revista del Ateneo de Valencia. Through these writings, she met many women who shared her intellectual leanings and concerns. With these friendships, she initiated discussions about equal rights for women, becoming a pioneer in Spain. It wasn't until the 1880s that she met Concepción Gimeno de Flaquer, who would become her close friend. Together, they co-founded a newspaper called La Ilustración de la Mujer on 1 March 1873. Gasso is known to have traveled throughout Spain and Europe, also working as a translator, as she was fluent in French and Italian, translating French poems, including those by George Sand. In addition, she assisted several secular philanthropic organizations and supported the creation of the Asociación para la Enseñanza de la Mujer. In 1872, Gasso joined the group "Las Hijas del Sol", a group of female writers affiliated with the Masonic organization Gran Oriente de España, whose president was Emilia Serrano de Wilson. Leopolda published several articles in its press.

She gained such popularity that she participated in the Ateneo Científico, Artístico y Literario de Valencia of Valencia, the main point of reference for the cultural development of the Valencian Community under the support of its president, Fernando de Alisal. Returning to her career as a painter, Gasso won several awards. The first was at the Industrial Art Exhibition for the Promotion of the Arts in 1871, followed by the Diploma of Honor at the Leonese Regional Exhibition in 1876 and at the Asociación de Escritores y Artistas Españoles, of which she was an honorary member, in 1855. Most of her writings were articles in magazines and publications, to which she was a regular contributor. It is known that she also wrote poems, but these were not preserved. Her articles were closely related to the feminism of the time, advocating for equal rights with men, its relationship with contemporary art, her pursuit of intellectual progress, the cultural development of Spain, and the country's social and economic equality.

== Death and legacy ==
While still young, but with very delicate health, she moved to Alicante seeking a better climate than that of Madrid or Toledo, and then to San Sebastián, before returning to Chamberí, Madrid, where she died at the age of 37. She was buried in the cemetery of the Sacramental de San Lorenzo y San José, in Chamberí district of Madrid.

Gasso's mother, Dionisia, and her best friend Concepción compiled Gasso's articles and publications, creating the anthology Colección de sus trabajos literarios (Collection of her literary works), which was published posthumously. It includes everything Leopolda Gassó y Vidal published, and also contains a prologue by Concepción Gimeno de Flaquer.

== Expositions ==
- Leonese Exhibition of 1876: She presented Portrait of Lucas Aguirre y Juárez, which she donated to the Society of Writers and Artists, and "Landscape of Asturias," which was sold in 1881.
- National Exhibition of Fine Arts of 1876: She exhibited the panel paintings Pensioner and A Beggar, the study for Landscape, and the canvas Portrait of Miss M.J.
- National Exhibition of Fine Arts of 1878: She exhibited Acileses Vendors, Petiraetre, and A Landscape.
- Madrid Arts Promotion Exhibition of 1881: She displayed Disordered Table and Still Life, earning an honorable mention.
- Valencia Regional Exhibition of 1883: She showed Two Small Paintings and Charcoal Portrait.

== Bibliography ==
- CASTÁN CHOCARRO, A., "Mujeres copistas en el Museo del Prado, 1843-1939" (Women copyists at the Prado Museum, 1843–1939), in Gil Salinas, R. & C. Lomba (coords.), Olvidadas y silenciadas. Mujeres artistas en la España contemporánea, Valencia, University of Valencia, 2021, pp. 97, 108
- DÍAZ SÁNCHEZ, P., "Leopolda Gassó y Vidal (1848-1885): pintora y escritora" (Leopolda Gassó y Vidal (1848–1885): painter and writer), in Díaz Sánchez, P., Franco, G. A. & M. J. Fuente Pérez (ed. lit.), Impulsando la historia desde la historia de las mujeres: La estela de Cristina Segura. Huelva, University of Huelva, 2012, pp. 439–448. ISBN 9788415633341
- DIEGO, E. de, La mujer y la pintura del XIX español. Cuatrocientas olvidadas y algunas más (Women and painting in 19th-century Spain. Four hundred forgotten women and a few more.), Madrid, Ensayos de Arte Cátedra, 2009, p. 375.
- EDER, R., "Las mujeres artistas en México", Anales del Instituto de Investigaciones Estéticas, UNAM, vol. XIII, no. 50, 1982, pp. 251–260. ISSN 1870-3062
- GARCÍA MARTÍN, F., "Leopolda Gassó y Vidal. Quintanar de la Orden, 1848 – Madrid, 1885", Toledo, Editorial Ledoria, 2020.
- GASSÓ Y VIDAL. L. Colección de sus trabajos literarios/Leopolda Gassó y Vidal; precedidos de una necrología de doña Concepción Gimeno (Collection of her literary works/Leopolda Gassó y Vidal; preceded by an obituary of Doña Concepción Gimeno). 1891.
- GASSÓ Y VIDAL. L. Biblioteca Nacional de España.
- OSSORIO Y BERNARD, M., Galería biográfica de artistas españoles del siglo XIX Archived 2024-12-08 at the Wayback Machine (Biographical gallery of 19th-century Spanish artists), Madrid, Ediciones Giner, 1975 (ed. orig. 1868–1869), pp. 283–84
- ROIG CONDOMINA, V., "El Ateneo Científico, Literario y Artístico de Valencia y su aportación a las artes en el último tercio del siglo XIX" (The Scientific, Literary and Artistic Athenaeum of Valencia and its contribution to the arts in the last third of the 19th century), Ars Longa, no. 6, 1995, p. 109
- SIMÓN PALMER, Mª del C., Escritoras españolas del siglo XIX (Spanish women writers of the 19th century), Alicante, Editorial Castalla, 1987.
- VARGAS MARTÍNEZ, A., "Amistad, escritura y política. Relaciones entre mujeres." (Friendship, writing, and politics. Relationships between women), in Bernárdez Rodal, A. (dir.), Escritoras y periodistas en Madrid (1876-1926) (Women writers and journalists in Madrid, 1876–1926), Madrid, Department of Employment and Citizen Services; Directorate General for Equal Opportunities. Madrid City Council, 2007, pp. 93–96. ISBN 9788469061312
