= Renan (footballer, born 1988) =

Brazilian footballer

Personal information
- Full name: Renan Cardoso Domingues
- Date of birth: August 25, 1988 (age 38)
- Place of birth: Salgado de São Félix, Brazil
- Height: 1.77 m (5 ft 10 in)
- Position: Midfielder

Team information
- Current team: Galícia

Youth career
- 2006–2007: Galícia

Senior career*
Years	Team	Apps	(Gls)
2007	Galícia	7	(0)
- * Club domestic league appearances and goals

Renan Cardoso Domingues (born August 25, 1988 in Salgado de São Félix), is a Brazilian midfielder. He currently plays for Galícia.

== Honours ==
- Best player: Bahia State League (U-20) 2007

== Contract ==
- 1 July 2007 to 30 July 2010
