= Concepción Gimeno de Flaquer =

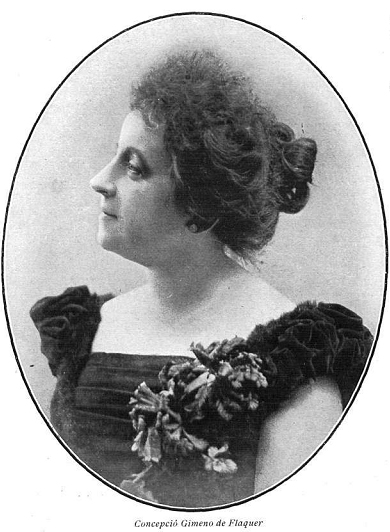
- Portrait photo in the "Feminal" supplement of La Ilustració Catalana (27 March 1910]
- Born: María de la Concepción Gimeno; 11 December 1850; Alcañiz, Spain
- Died: 1919 (aged 68–69); Buenos Aires, Argentina
- Occupations: writer; editor; feminist; traveler
- Spouse: Francisco de Paula Flaquer
- Writing career
- Genres: fiction; non-fiction
- Subject: women's rights

Concepción Gimeno de Flaquer (née, Gimeno; Alcañiz, 1850 - Buenos Aires, 1919) was a Spanish writer, editor, feminist and transatlantic traveler. She was the author of novels and short stories, as well as non-fiction, including essays, opinion works, social commentaries, and theatrical reviews.

== Early life and education ==
María de la Concepción Gimeno was born in Alcañiz on 11 December 1850. Her father, Juan Gimeno, was a high-ranking military officer and defender of the Bourbon Reforms. Her mother, María Francisca Gil Buizán, after being widowed, married a notary of the court of Zaragoza. She received her education in Zaragoza.

== Career ==
In 1870, she moved to Madrid where she began her career as a journalist in El Correo de la Moda of Madrid. For this magazine, she published 16 articles, the most important ones being those dealing with women. In fact, Gimeno fought for the emancipation of women. Thanks to this magazine, she entered the social and literary circle where she began to have friendships with high-ranking women who were attentive to the emancipation of women. Gimeno became known in the literary gatherings of Wenceslao Ayguals de Izco. She founded and direction La Ilustración de la Mujer. Besides El Correo de la Moda, she collaborated in publications such as La Mujer, and El Ramillete of Barcelona, among others. Her correspondence from the early 1870s with the actor Manuel Catalina is preserved.

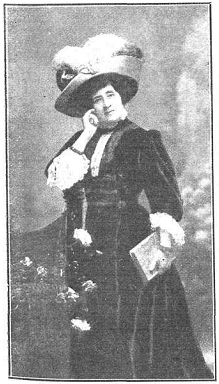
Portrait photo in "Conferencias feministas", Caras y Caretas, 30 April 1910

Her success and public recognition began in 1883 in Mexico. In August 1883, she went to live in Mexico with her husband. There, she founded the publication El Álbum de la mujer: Periódico Ilustrado. During her stay in Mexico, Gimeno became an example for many women as she was always in favor of women having access to culture and public education. On her return to Spain, she established El Álbum Ibero-Americano (Madrid, 1890), as an adaptation of the magazine she founded in Mexico. In Spain, she participated in the most important literary gatherings of the time. Throughout her life, she traveled around the world between Mexico, Venezuela, Guatemala, El Salvador, Germany, Italy and France.

Gimeno was an active defender of women's rights, She wrote novels about marital infidelities, abandonment of women, and convents that served as shelters. Her novel Victorina ó heroísmo del corazón (1873), was published by Ramón Ortega y Frías. Among her other works are La mujer española (1877), El doctor alemán (1880), Elina Durval (1878), La mujer juzgada por una mujer (1882), Madres de hombres célebres (1884), Suplicio de una coqueta (1885), Evangelios de la mujer, Vidas paralelas, Mujeres de regia estirpe, and Culpa y expiación. After the death of her friend, Leopolda Gassó y Vidal, Gimeno and Gassó's mother compiled Gasso's articles and publications, creating the anthology Colección de sus trabajos literarios (Collection of her literary works), which was published posthumously. It includes everything that Gassó published, as well as a prologue by Gimeno.

== Personal life ==
At the age of 29, she married Francisco de Paula Flaquer, director of the publications La Aurora and El Álbum Ibero-Americano.

She died in Buenos Aires, Argentina in 1919.

== Selected works ==
- Victorina o heroísmo del corazón [Victorina or heroism of the heart]. Madrid: Imprenta de la Asociación del Arte de Imprimir. 1873.
- La mujer española [The Spanish woman]. Madrid: Imprenta y librería de Miguel Guijarro. 1877.
- El doctor alemán [The German doctor]. Zaragoza: Establecimiento tipográfico de Calisto Ariño. 1880.
- La mujer juzgada por una mujer [The woman judged by a woman]. Barcelona: Imprenta de Luis Tasso y Serra. 1882.
- Gimeno De Flaquer, Concepción (1895). Madres de hombres célebres [Mothers of famous men]. Madrid: Tipografía de Alfredo Alonso.
- La mujer intelectual [The intellectual woman]. Madrid: Asilo de Huérfanos del Sagrado Corazón de Jesús. 1901.
