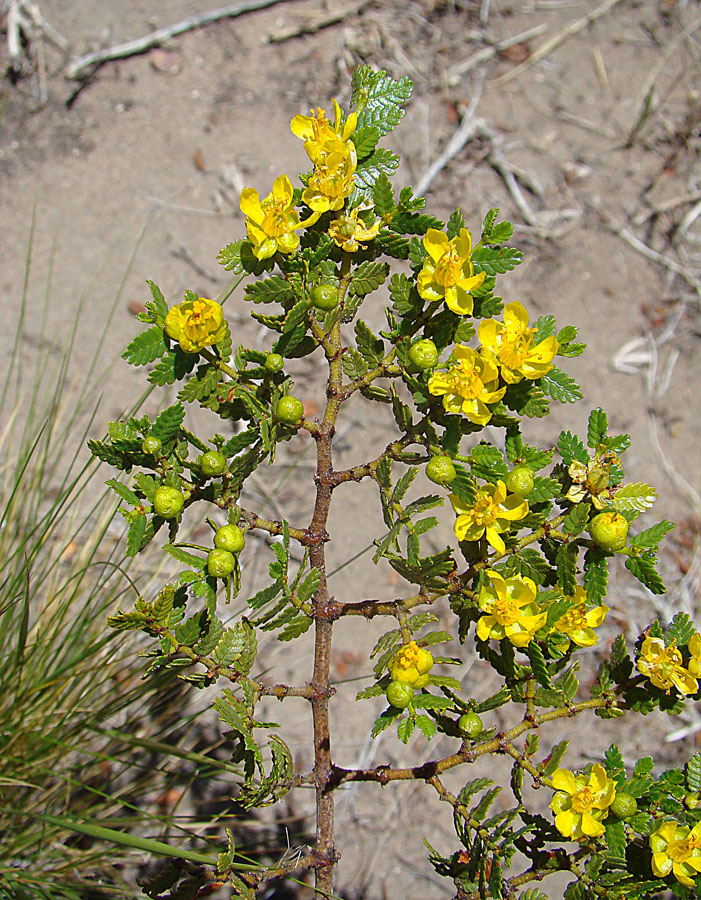

Scientific classification
- Kingdom: Plantae
- Clade: Tracheophytes
- Clade: Angiosperms
- Clade: Eudicots
- Clade: Rosids
- Order: Zygophyllales
- Family: Zygophyllaceae
- Genus: Larrea
- Species: L. nitida

Binomial name
- Larrea nitida Cav.

= Larrea nitida =

Species of flowering plant

Larrea nitida is a species of flowering plant in the family Zygophyllaceae. It is native to North and Central Chile and Argentina.

== Distribution and habitat ==
Larrea nitida is widely distributed between Salta and Chubut and lives in altitudes of 1500 to 3000 metres.

== Classification ==
Larrea nitida is classified in the genus Larrea in the family Zygophyllaceae.

== Uses ==
Larrea nitida has been used in traditional medicine as an anti-inflammatory, a wound disinfectant, an antibacterial and an antifungal.
