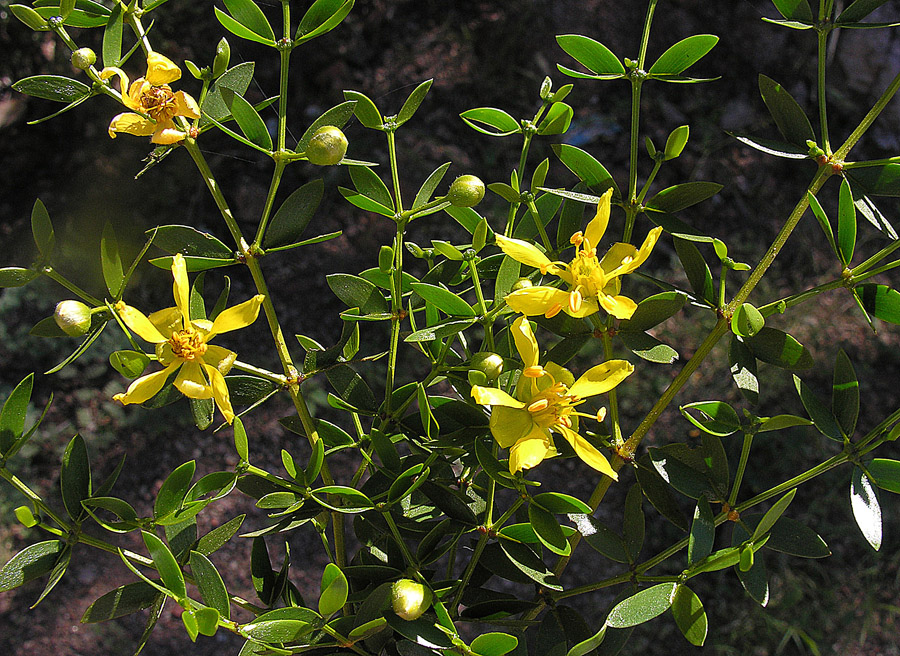

Scientific classification
- Kingdom: Plantae
- Clade: Tracheophytes
- Clade: Angiosperms
- Clade: Eudicots
- Clade: Rosids
- Order: Zygophyllales
- Family: Zygophyllaceae
- Genus: Larrea
- Species: L. divaricata

Binomial name
- Larrea divaricata Cav.

Synonyms
- Covillea divaricata (Cav.) Vail; Neoschroetera divaricata (Cav.) Briq.; Schroeterella divaricata (Cav.) Briq.

= Larrea divaricata =

Species of flowering plant

Larrea divaricata, commonly known as chaparral, is a small evergreen bush in the family Zygophyllaceae. It is native to arid regions of South America, where it is known as jarilla or jarillo. It was first described in 1800 by the Spanish botanist Antonio José Cavanilles.

== Description ==
Larrea divaricata is a slow-growing shrub growing to a maximum height of 3 m (10 ft). The stems are cylindrical. The small, dark green, elliptical leaves are resinous and grow in opposite pairs. The yellow flowers have five petals and appear in October and November. The fruits are dry capsules containing greyish hairs and five seeds. The plant is dispersed when goats eat the leaves and seed capsules in the dry season when little grass is available.

== Distribution and habitat ==
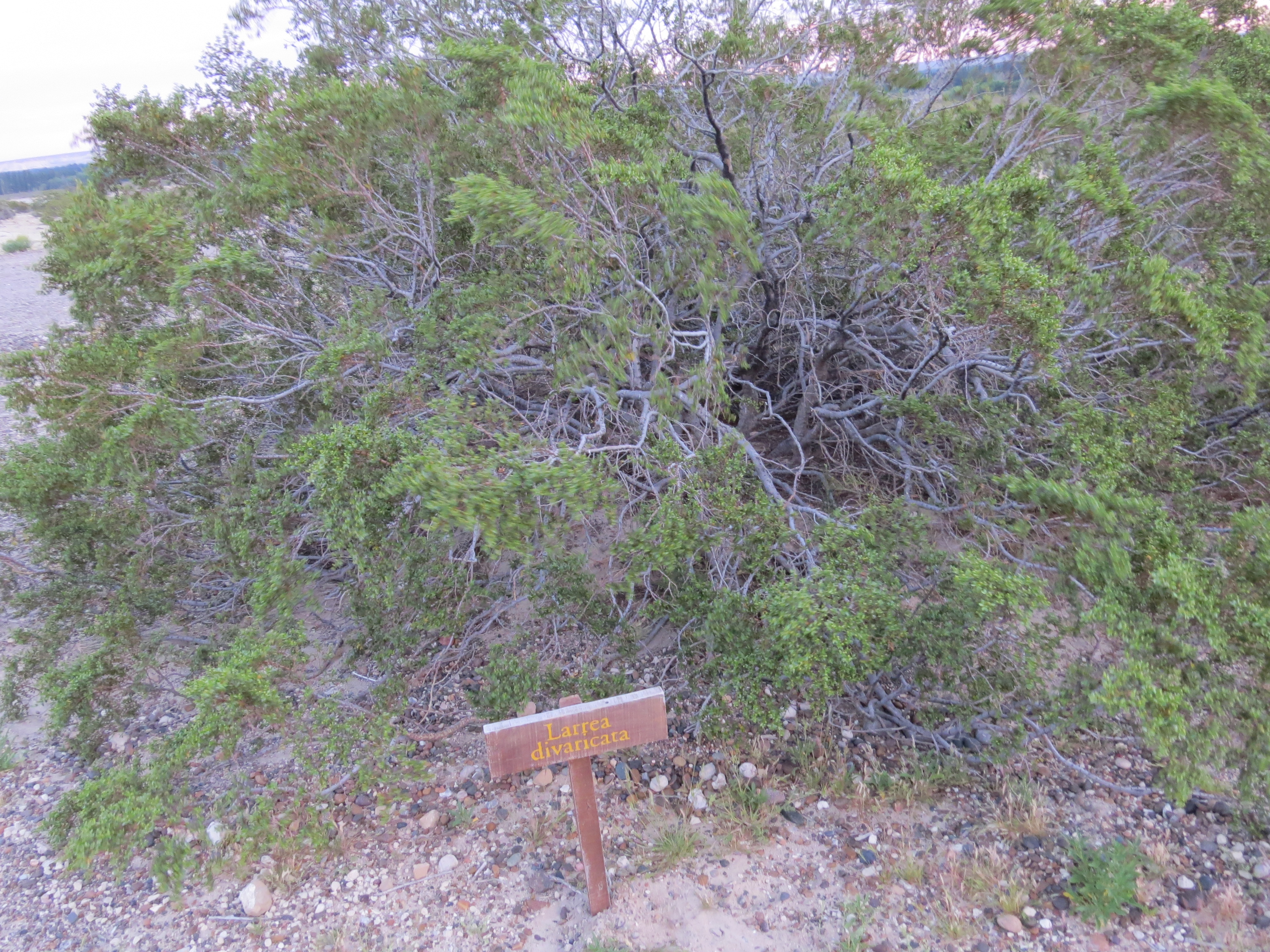
L. divaricata

Larrea divaricata is endemic to southwestern South America. Its range includes Bolivia, Peru, Chile, and Argentina, especially Patagonia. It is found in open woodland, scrubland, and rough grassland.

This plant only grows in South America, whereas the closely related Larrea tridentata occurs in North America. The two have been confused in the past, but in the 1940s, they were found to be separate species.

== Uses ==
The resin contains lignans, polyphenolic substances with possible therapeutic uses. The plant also contains guaiaretic acid and its derivatives, flavonoids, triterpenes, and other organic substances.

In Bolivia, an extract of L. divaricata has been used as an abortifacient. Since this plant is suspected of being used as an adulterant in preparations of "chapparral", a herbal remedy made from L. tridentata, the use of that substance during pregnancy and lactation is not advised.

An aqueous extract has been shown to have antimicrobial properties against Helicobacter pylori, a Gram-negative bacterium found in the stomach and known to be associated with gastritis, peptic ulcers, and stomach cancer.
