= Txomin Peillen =

French writer and academic (1932–2022)

- Born: Txomin Peillen Karrikaburu; 17 November 1932; 18th arrondissement of Paris, France
- Died: 9 December 2022 (aged 90); Cambo-les-Bains, France
- Occupations: Writer; Linguist; Biologist

Txomin Peillen Karrikaburu (17 November 1932 – 9 December 2022) was a French writer, linguist, and biologist.

== Biography ==
Born into a family originally from Soule (Basque Country), Peillen was born in Montmartre in the 18th arrondissement of Paris to Joannes and Maddalen. While attending secondary school in Paris, he taught Basque at the Lycée Lavoisier. He earned a doctorate in Basque studies alongside Jean Haritschelhar and was a professor of Basque philology in Bayonne.

Peillen was a fierce activist of Basque culture as a member of the Euskaltzaindia and the Basque Studies Society, for which he earned the Manuel Lekuona Award in 2009. In total, he wrote 43 books, 39 of which were in Basque, three in French, and one in Spanish. Throughout his life, he lived in Bayonne and Sainte-Engrâce.

Peillen died in Cambo-les-Bains on 9 December 2022, at the age of 90.

== Publications ==
=== Books ===
==== In Basque ====
- Gauaz ibiltzen dana (1967)
- Itzal Gorria, 1966 urteko Domingo Agirre Saria (1972)
- Igela: euskaldun heterodoxoen errebista (1979)
- Eliza doneskaiñak, pagan ohitura ta sineste baten ondakina: XVII. mendetik XX. raiño (1980)
- Petiri "Agurgarria" Cluñy-koa napar-euskaldun sineste baten jakile (1980)
- Xaguxarra: literatur aldizkaria (1980)
- Bela-ko zaldunaren Zuberotar hiztegia: XVIII : men-dean (1983)
- Oreina eta gizoreina literaturgintzan eta edergintzan (1983)
- Urdaitx-etik Santa Graziraino berzokoratu herria (1985)
- Euskal antzertia: le théâtre basque (1987)
- Euskalki literarioak (1992)
- Itzal gorria (2000)
- Ehiza eta zepoka: (zuberoako basabürüan) (2002)
- Euskaldun etorkinak Ameriketan (2003)
- Mende joanaz (2003)
- Abd El Kader: olerkia (2006)
- Joanes Leizarraga: vida y obra (2007)
- Jende ederrak lanean: (who's who?) (2008)
- Biziaren hiztegiaz (2009)

==== In French ====
- Parlons euskara : la langue des Basques (1995)
- Les emprunts de la langue basque à l'occitan de Gascogne : étude du dialecte souletin de l'euskara (1998)
- Conception du monde et culture basque (1998)

==== In Spanish ====
- Poema filosofico manuscrito del siglo XIX (1982)
- El castellano y lo español en la provincia de Sola o Zuberoa (1986)
- Teatro popular europeo (1999)

=== Novels ===
- Gauaz ibiltzen dana (1967)
- Itzal gorria (1972)
- Gatu beltza (1973)
- Atxorra eta altximia (1982)
- Aldjezairia askatuta (1982)
- Aintza txerriari! (1986)
- Kristina Bolsward (1991)
- Alarguntsa beltza (2001)
- Ale berdea (2001)
- Ale gorriak (2001)
- Jan Dabrowski (2013)
- Nina Waita : arupu baten itzalean (2015)
- Zaldi beltzak zeruan (2018)

=== Essays ===
- Jusef Egiategiren lehen liburia (1983)
- Bizidunak haurren eta helduen heziketan (1995)
- Euskaldunen ingurugiroan (espazioa eta denbora) (2001)
- Bosquejos vasco-uruguayos (2003)
- Baloreak Euskal Herrian eta beste gizarteetan (2005)

=== Poetry ===
- Mende joanaz (2003)

=== Autobiography ===
- Paristar euskaldun bat (ni... neu) (1987)

=== Ethnologies ===
- Allande Elixagari ligiarraren ixtorioak (1985)
- Animismua Zuberoan (1985)
- Herri-sendakuntza eta sendagingoa Zuberoan (1998)
- Zuberoako itzal-argiak (euskarazko jakilegoak) (1998)
