= Santa María la Mayor (Alcañiz) =

Church in Alcañiz, Spain

Coordinates: 41°03′03″N 0°07′54″W

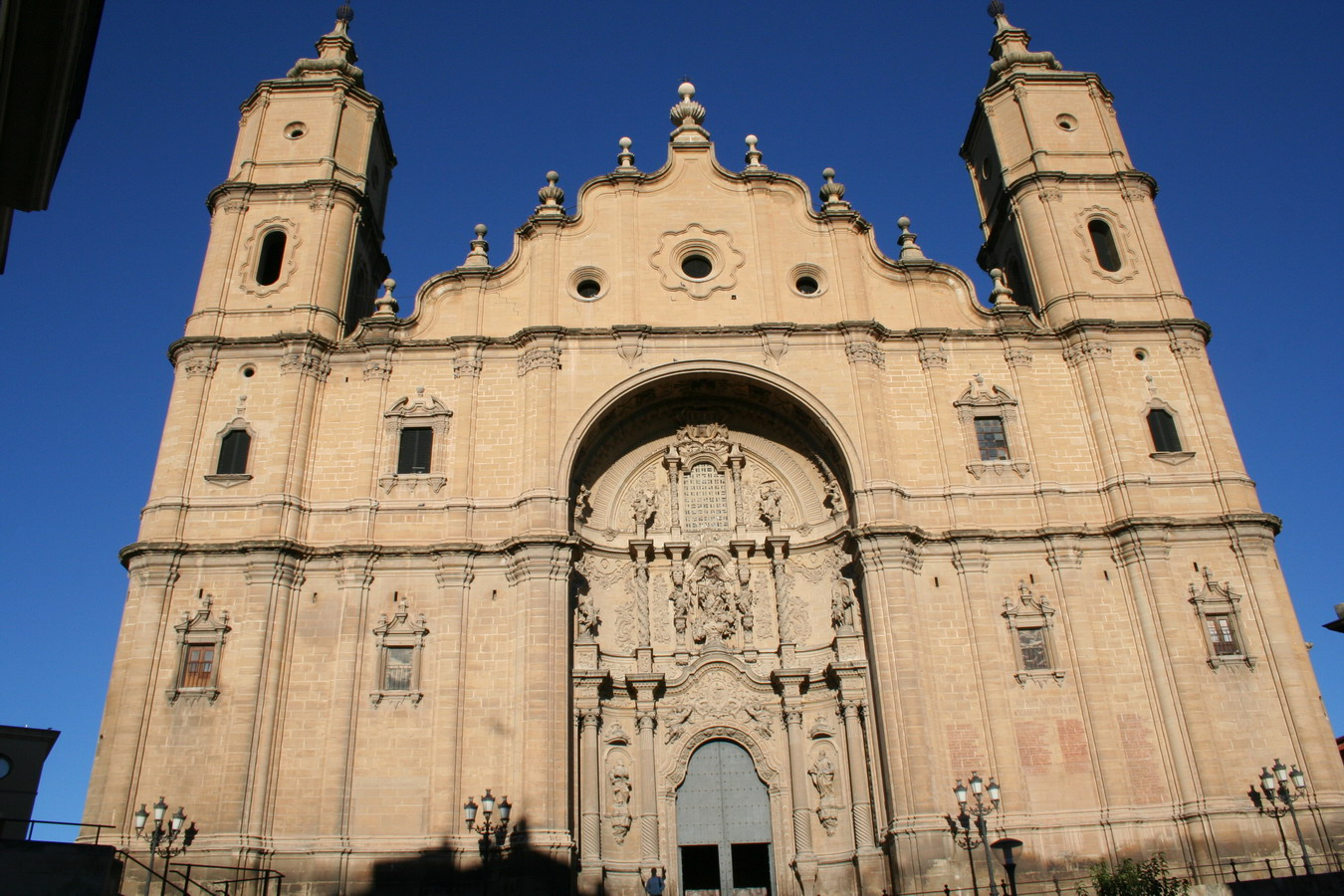
Façade of the church.

Santa María la Mayor is a church in Alcañiz, Aragon, northern Spain. It had the status of collegiate church from 1407 to 1851. It includes a large Gothic tower, and a wide façade in Baroque style.

== History and description ==
The Gothic church was built in the 13th century: of it, the bell tower and other fragments remain. This church had a nave and two aisles, a polygonal apse and an ambulatory. The size of the tower was motivated by a competition of the communal authority with the nearby castle of the Order of Calatrava. Pope Benedict XIII, in 1407, gave it the status of collegiate church.

In the 16th century, a chapel housing the images of the Virgin of the Solitude and of Jesus, was added. In the 18th century, it was decided to demolish the Gothic church, at the time in poor state (a column in the choir had collapsed), and to replace it with a Baroque building based on the Basilica of Our Lady of the Pillar at Zaragoza, with a higher capacity. The new edifice has a façade with two high side towers and a central portal. The latter was designed by the Basque artist Domingo de Yarza (also responsible for that in the Basilica of the Pillar. In the lower section are the depictions of Sts. Peter and Paul, while in the second are four Archangels flanking a large sculpture of St. Mary; in the top section are St. Thomas of Aquino on the left and St. Vincent Ferrer on the right. Over the gate is the crest of the collegiate, with the bamboo of Alcañiz's coat of arms and Benedict XIII's coat of arms as well. The portal was finished in 1779.

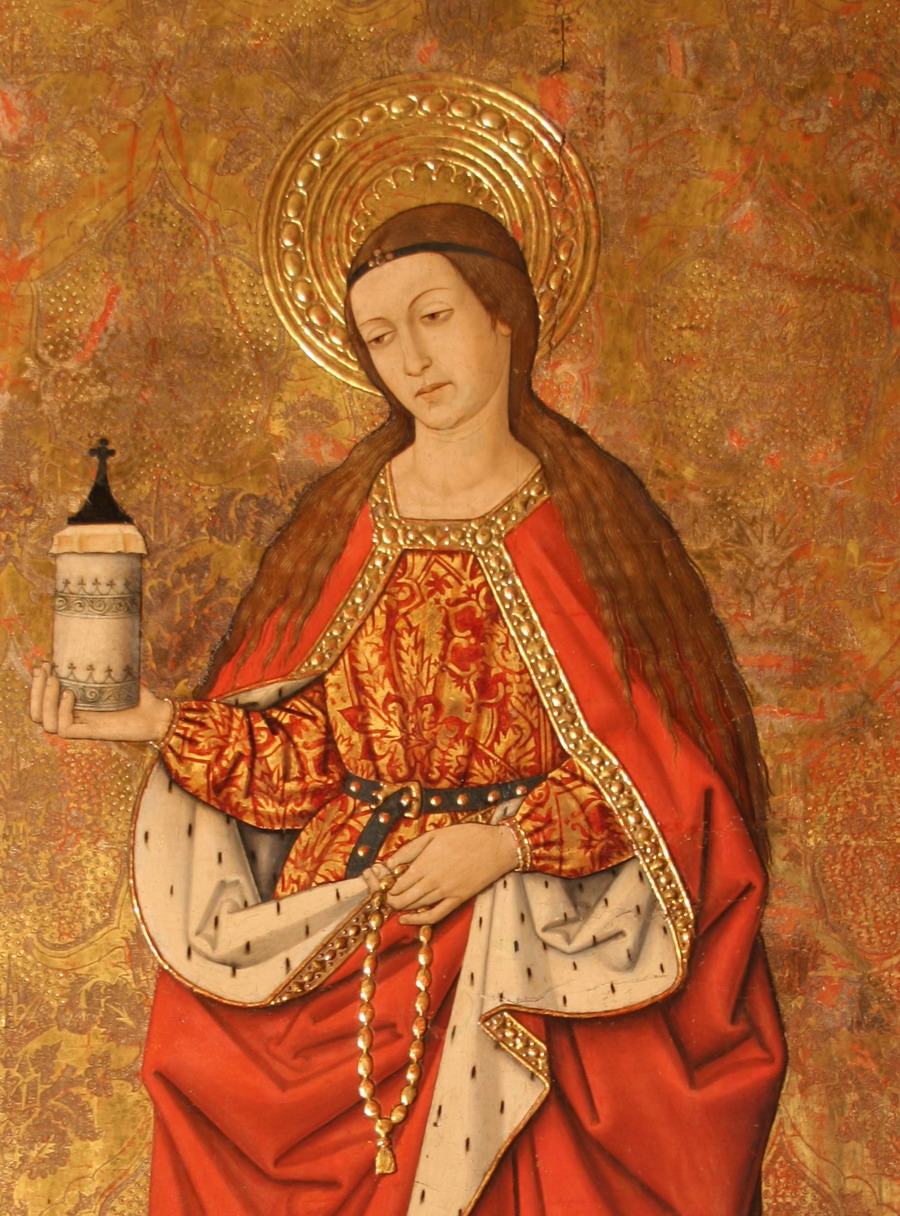
Gothic painting of St. Mary Magdalene.

The nave and the arms of the transept are covered with barrel vault. The aisles are instead covered by a groin vault, while the lateral chapels are characterized oval and circular domes. The cimborio of the central dome is made of brick. It has an octagonal ground plan and it is decorated with geometrical motifs.

The interior houses several paintings, the most relevant being a Gothic polyptych attributed to the workshop of Domingo Ram, including several predellas and a depiction of St. Mary Magdalene. Other works include six paintings from the early 16th century, attributed to one "Master of Alcañiz".

== See also ==
- Catholic Church in Spain

== Sources ==
- Cid Priego, Carlos (1956). La Colegiata de Alcañiz. Teruel: Instituto de Estudios Turolenses.
- Magdalena Lacambra, Federico (1944). La iglesia colegiata de Alcañiz. Apuntes históricos. Zaragoza: El Noticiero.
