= Juan Antonio Hernández Pérez de Larrea =

Spanish bishop

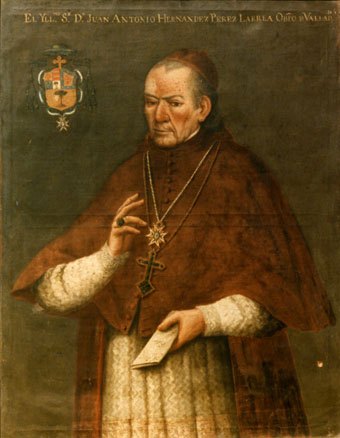
- Born: September 30, 1730; Villar del Salz, Spain
- Died: April 21, 1803 (aged 72); Valladolid, Spain
- Scientific career
- Fields: Botany

Juan Antonio Hernández Pérez de Larrea (September 30, 1730 – April 21, 1803) was a Spanish botanist, director of the Sociedad Económica de los Amigos del País, and Bishop of Valladolid.

== Biography ==
Larrea was born into a noble family. Excelling in theological studies, he became a pastor in the town of Terriente in 1760.

In 1775, he was appointed canon of Zaragoza. Here he became invested in the botanical garden of the city, and experimented on the making of carmine dye and the spinning of silk.

In 1788, he was anointed as a knight of the Order of Charles III.

In 1792 he began to collaborate with the Real Academia de Nobles y Bellas Artes de San Luis (Royal Academy of Nobles and Fine Arts of San Luis). In 1798, he became the director of the Academy.

Larrea was appointed bishop of the diocese of Valladolid in 1801. It was here he died in 1803.

== Legacy ==
The plant genus Larrea was named in his honor.

== Publications ==
- Oración panegirica que en la translación del Santísimo Sacramento a su nueva parroquia de Santa Cruz, executada en el 8 de octubre de 1780. Zaragoza
