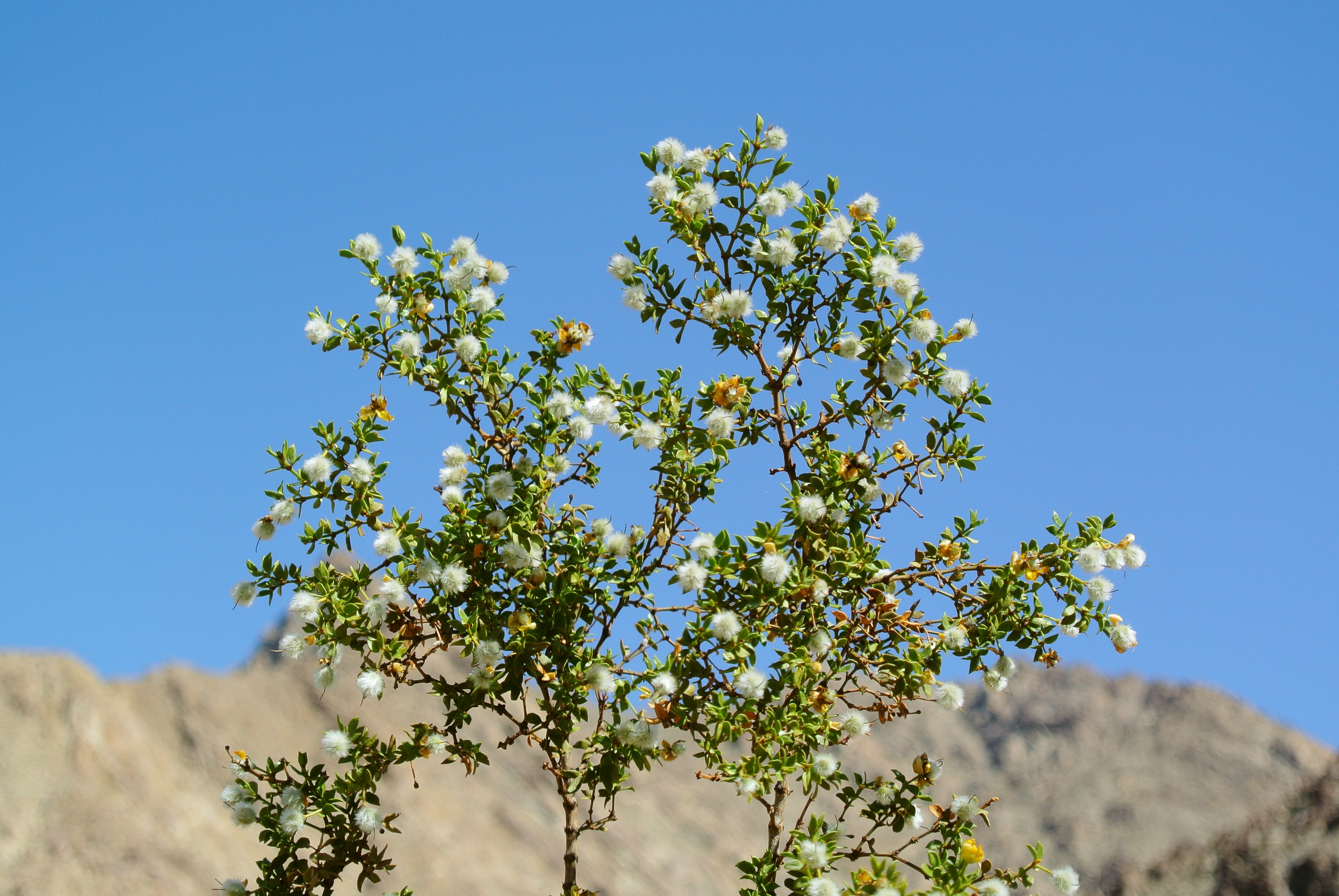
- Larrea tridentata

Scientific classification
- Kingdom: Plantae
- Clade: Tracheophytes
- Clade: Angiosperms
- Clade: Eudicots
- Clade: Rosids
- Order: Zygophyllales
- Family: Zygophyllaceae
- Subfamily: Larreoideae
- Genus: Larrea; Cav.

Species
- Larrea ameghinoi Speg.; Larrea cuneifolia Cav.; Larrea divaricata Cav.; Larrea nitida Cav.; Larrea tridentata (DC.) Coville

Synonyms
- Covillea Vail; Neoschroetera Briq.; Schroeterella Briq.

= Larrea =

Genus of shrubs

Larrea is a genus of flowering plants in the caltrop family, Zygophyllaceae. It contains five species of evergreen shrubs that are native to the Americas. The generic name honours Bishop Juan Antonio Hernández Pérez de Larrea, a patron of science. South American members of this genus are known as jarillas and can produce fertile interspecific hybrids. One of the more notable species is the creosote bush (L. tridentata) of the southwestern United States and northwestern Mexico. The King Clone ring in the Mojave Desert is a creosote bush clonal colony estimated to be about 11,700 years old.

== Species ==
Five species are accepted.

- Larrea ameghinoi Speg.
- Larrea cuneifolia Cav.
- Larrea divaricata Cav.
- Larrea nitida Cav.
- Larrea tridentata (DC.) Coville – creosote bush
