= Domingo Lorenzo =

Dominican Republic sport shooter

Personal information
- Full name: Domingo Lorenzo Conde
- Nationality: Dominican
- Born: 14 September 1928 Galicia, Spain
- Died: 21 June 2009 (aged 80) San Pedro de Macorís, San Pedro de Macorís, Dominican Republic

Sport
- Country: Dominican Republic
- Sport: Sports shooting
- Events: Trap, Skeet

Domingo Lorenzo Conde (14 September 1928 – 21 June 2009) was a Dominican sports shooter. He competed at the 1968 Summer Olympics and the 1972 Summer Olympics. He was inducted into the San Pedro de Macorís Hall of Fame in 2010. He was born in Galicia, Spain and arrived in the Dominican Republic when he was 22, receiving the Dominican citizenship.

Lorenzo Conde participated in the Shooting competitions at the 1975 World Championships, 1978 and 1982 Central American and Caribbean Games and the 1979 and 1975 Pan American Games.
