= Domingo Andrés =

Spanish humanist, writer, and poet

Domingo Andrés (1525, Alcañiz – 1599) was a Spanish humanist, writer and poet.

== Publications ==
- Poema extenso en siete libros acerca de la redención de la humanidad.
- De Jacobo et Joanne Zebedeis fratribus.
- De novissimo juditio.
- De Petro Archi-Apostolo.
- Dos elegías sobre el nacimiento y muerte de Cristo.
- Poecilistichon, sive variorum libri V, 1594.
