= Salgado de São Félix =

- Municipality
- Flag

- Location in Brazil
- Coordinates: 7°21′S 35°26′W
- Country: Brazil
- Region: Northeast
- State: Paraíba
- Mesoregion: Agreste Paraibano

Population (2020)
  - Total: 12,131
- Time zone: UTC−3 (BRT)

Salgado de São Félix (Central northeastern portuguese pronunciation: [sɐwˈɡadu di ˈsɐ̃w ˈfɛlik͡s]) is a municipality in the state of Paraíba in the Northeast Region of Brazil.

== See also ==
- List of municipalities in Paraíba
