= Domingo Rivero =

Spanish poet

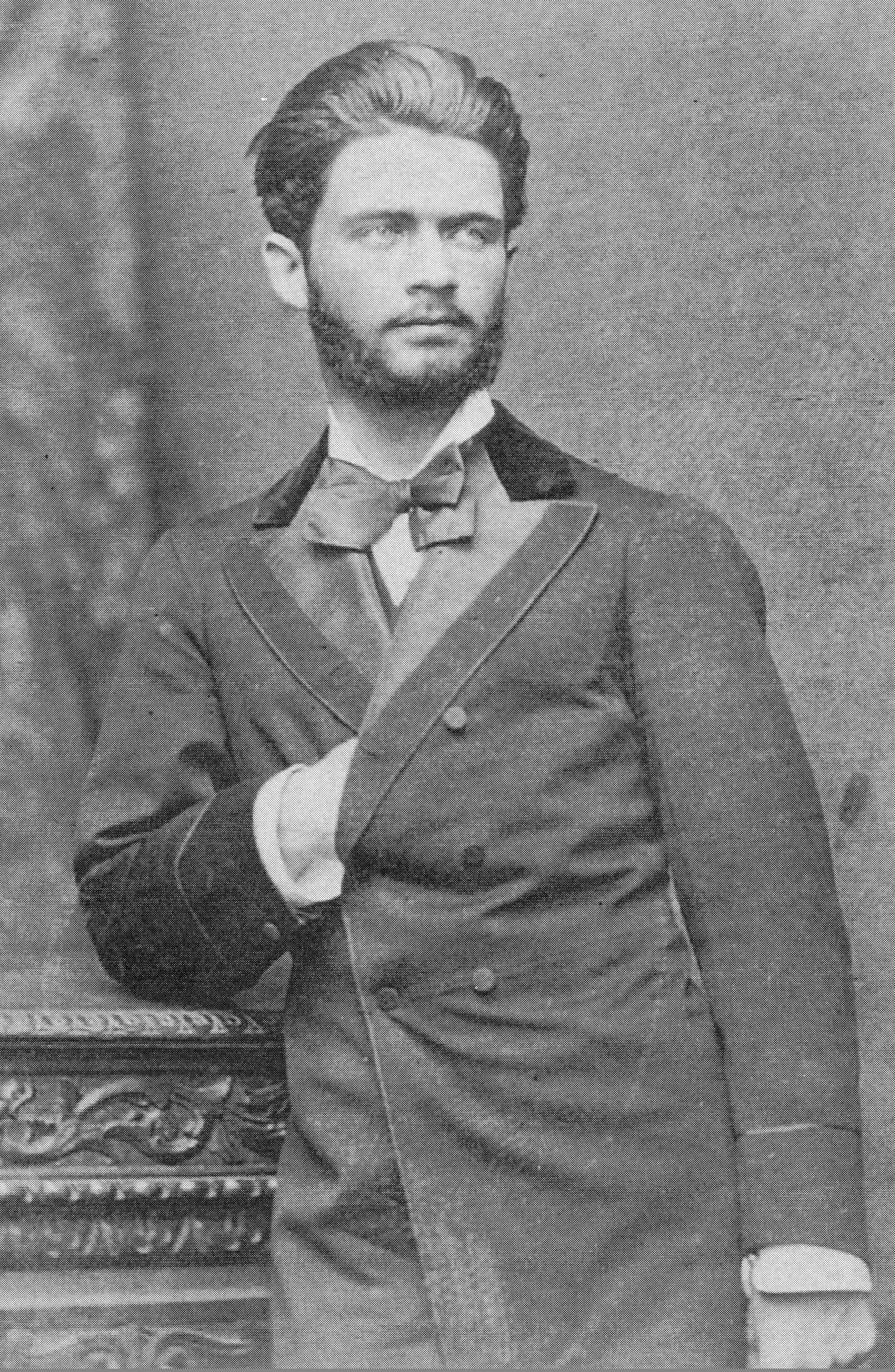
- Domingo Rivero.
- Born: 23 March 1852
- Died: 8 September 1929 (aged 77)
- Occupation: Poet
- Writing career
- Period: 1899-1928
- Subject: Poetry
- Notable works: Yo, a mi cuerpo

Domingo Rivero (23 March 1852 – 8 September 1929) was a Spanish poet from the Canary Islands.

== Family ==
He was born in Arucas on 23 March 1852, son of Juan Rivero Bolaños and Rafaela María de San Félix.

=== Marriage and children ===
Rivero married Doña María de las Nieves del Castillo Olivares y Fierro in 1885. They had seven children:

- Fernando (died at 17 months)
- Dolores
- Nieves
- María del Pino
- María Teresa
- Fernando
- Juan (died in 1928)

== Early life ==
In his childhood, he lived in Guía, the town where his father was born.

He studied at the Colegio San Agustín de La Palmas de Gran Canaria. In 1869, he was elected to the committee of the Young Republicans. After a brief period in Paris he moved to London in 1870, where he met Fermín Salvochea.

From 1873 to 1881 he studied law in Madrid and Seville.

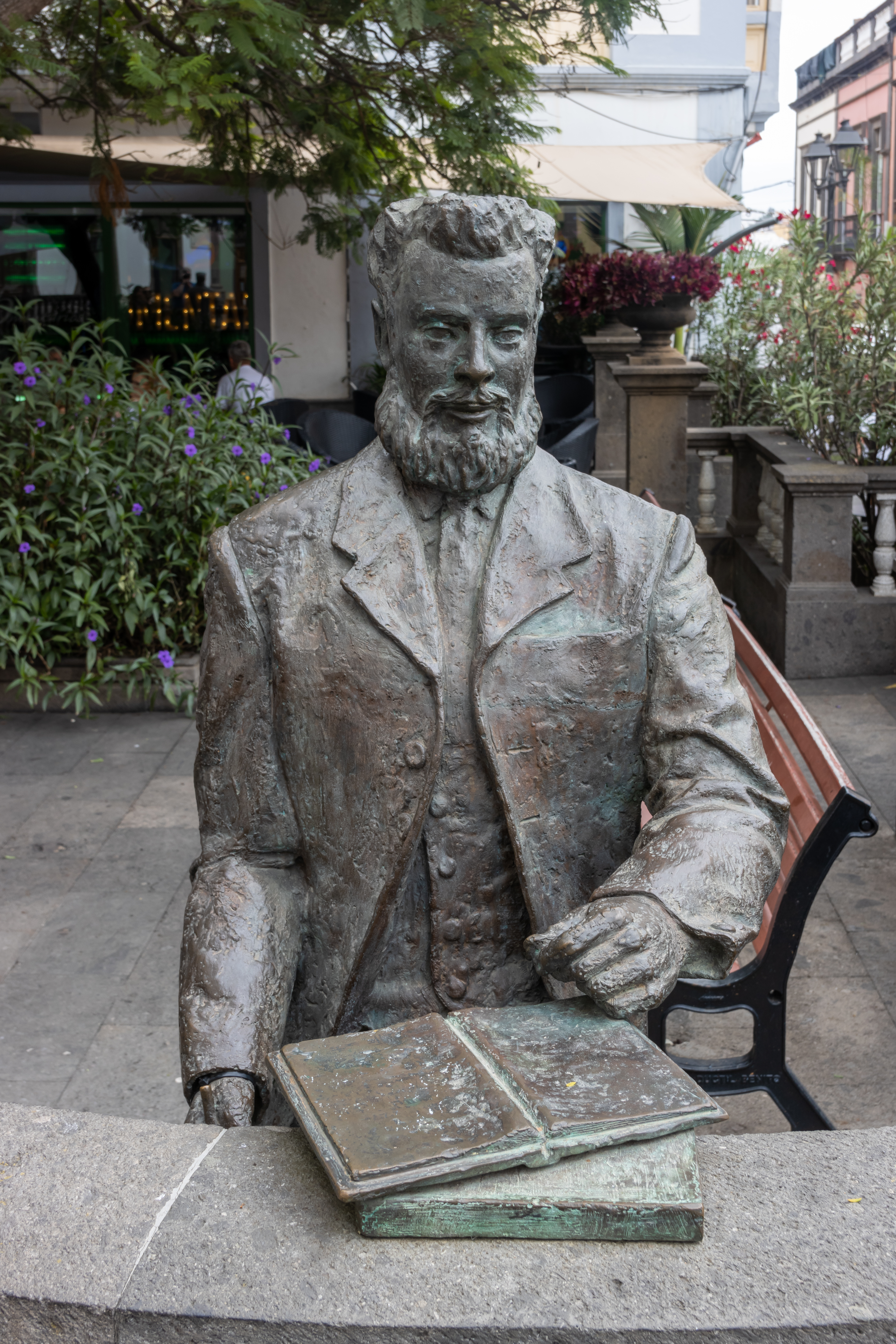
Statue in Arucas

== Career ==
After his studies he returned to Las Palmas in 1881, and remained in the Canary Islands for the rest of his life. He served as Relator of the National Audience of Las Palmas, and in 1904 became Secretary of the Government of Las Palmas until his retirement on 29 July 1921.

== Poetry ==
In 1899, Domingo Rivero wrote his first poem.

Due to a meningeal epithelioma, his son Juan died in 1928, which made Rivero give up poetry.

=== Notable works ===
"De la ermita perdida..." (1909) was the first poem of Domingo Rivero that caused a sensation in people.

Various sources point out that "Yo, a mi cuerpo", his most famous work written in 1922, as representing the top of Canary Islands literature at the time.

== Death and legacy ==
=== Death ===
He died in Las Palmas 8 September 1929, reportedly in the "early hours".

=== Legacy ===
In Las Palmas, there is a street named after him.
