= Alcañiz =

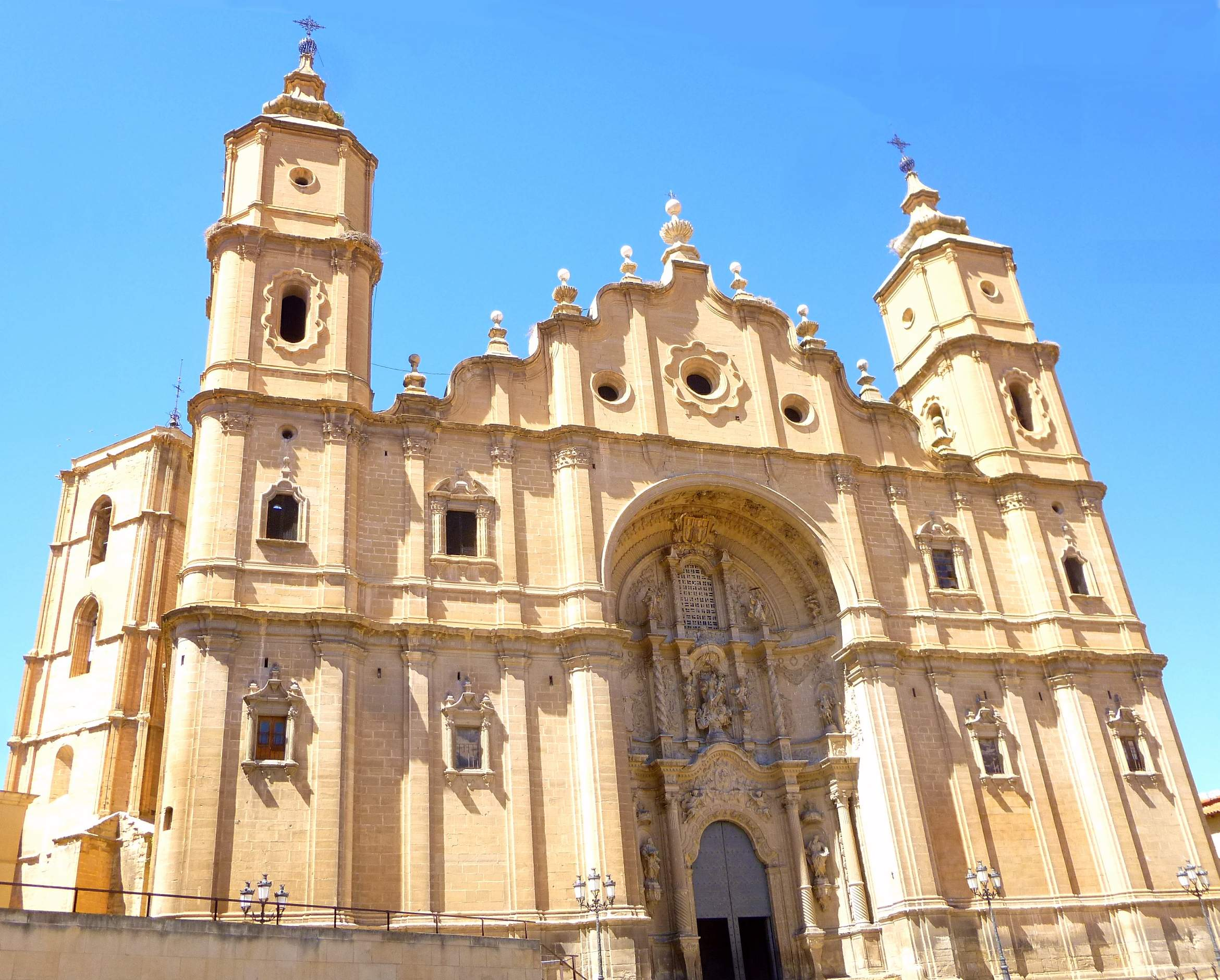
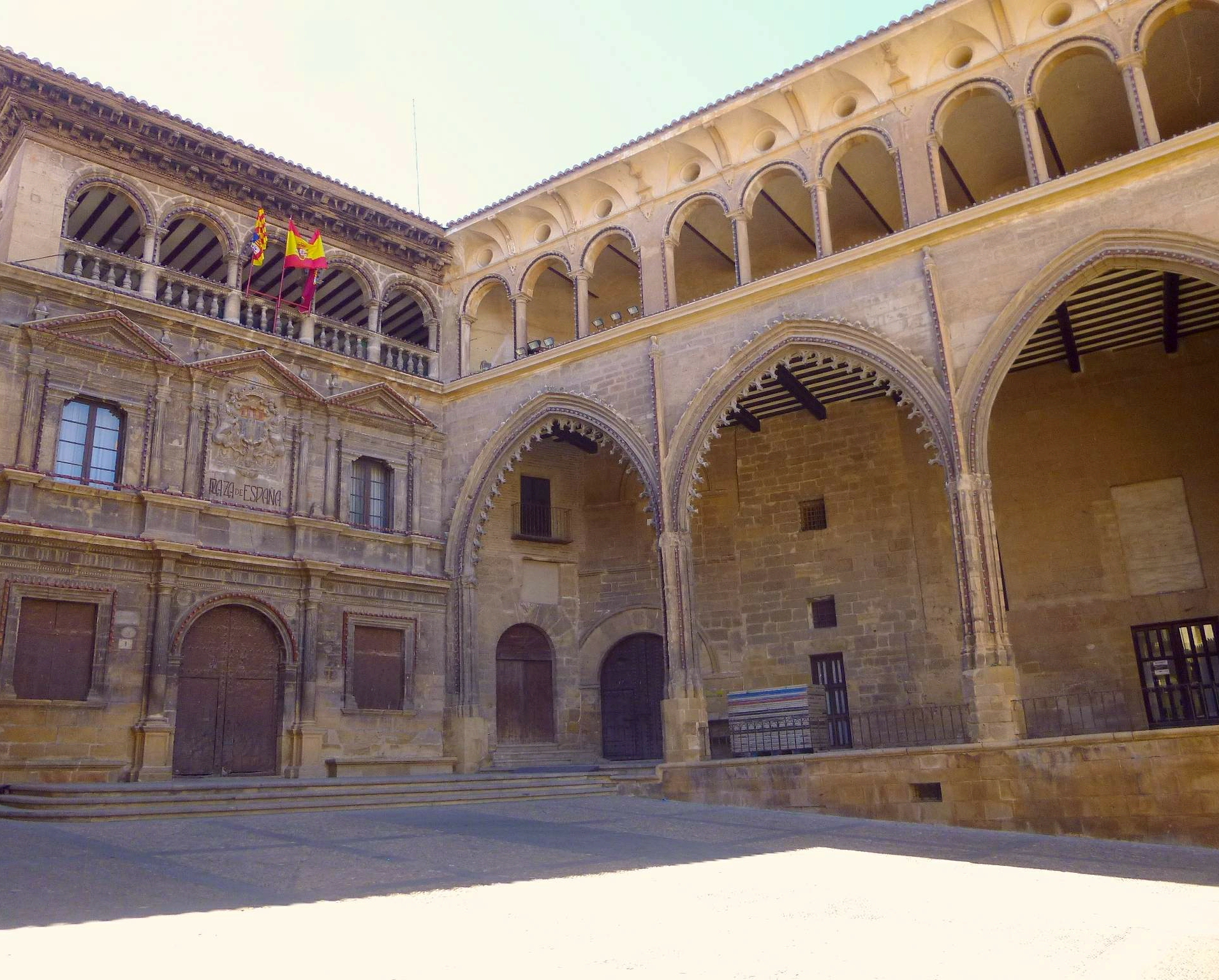
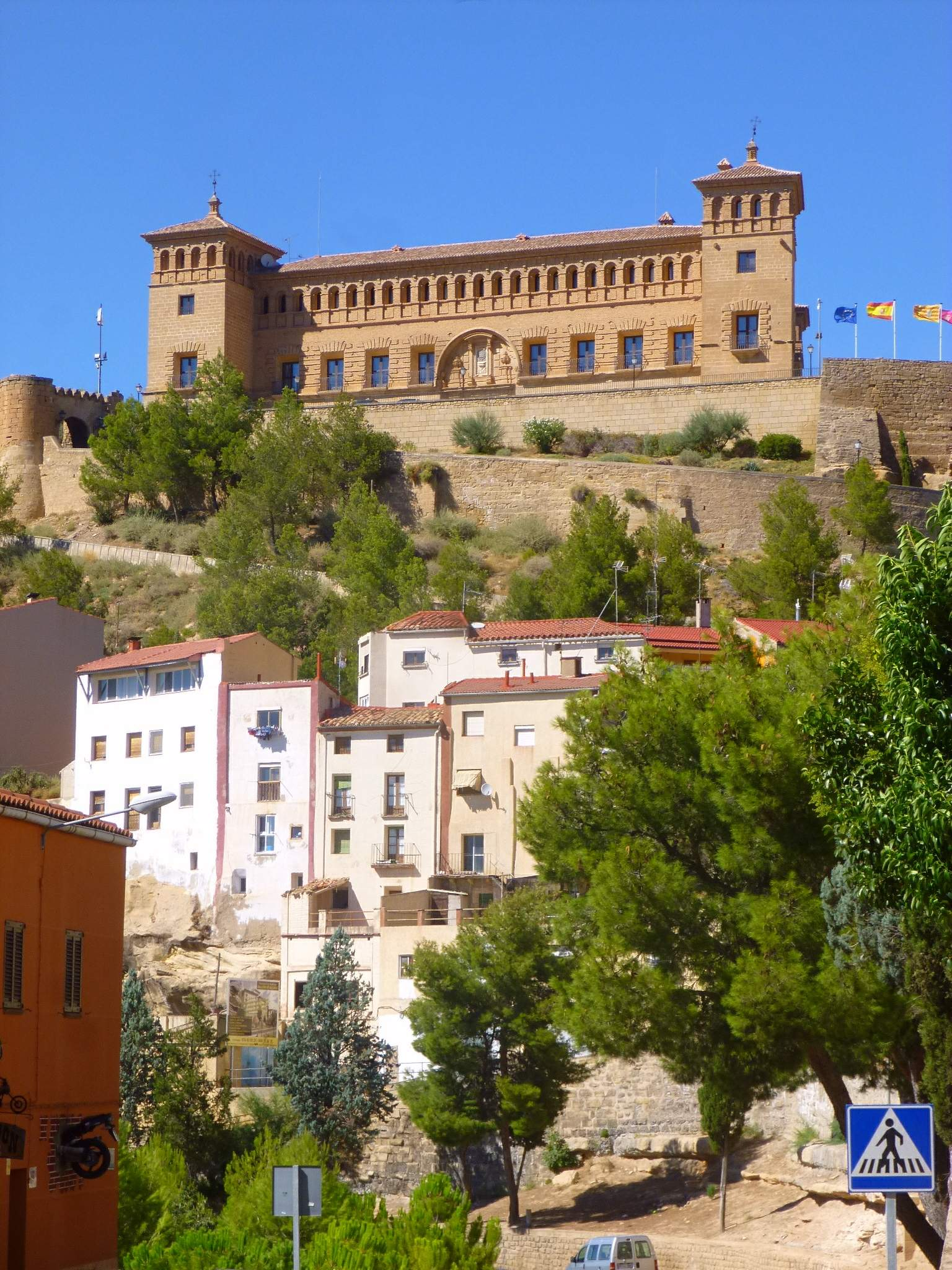
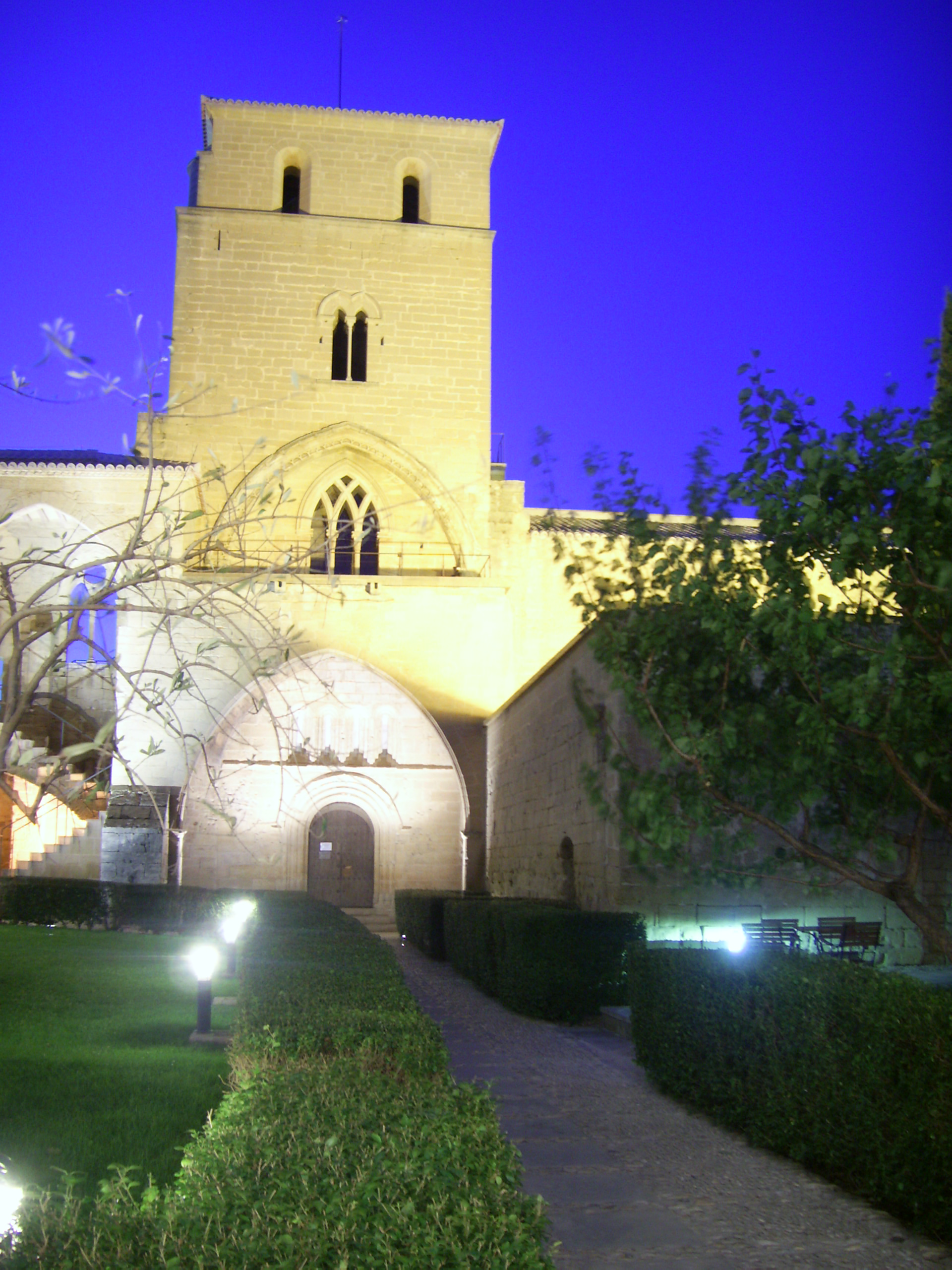
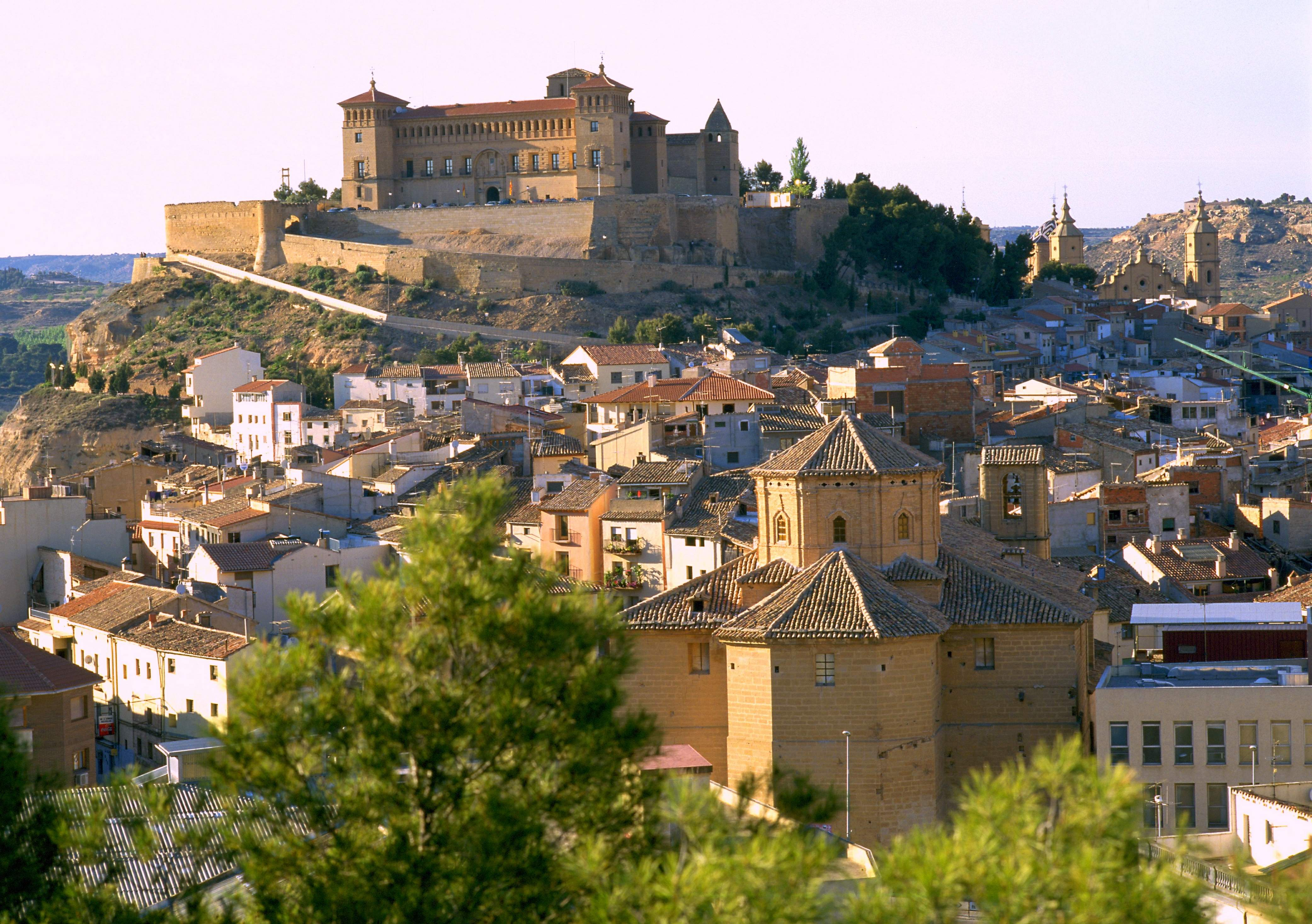

- Flag Coat of arms

- Location of Alcañiz within Aragon Location of Alcañiz withinSpain
- Coordinates: 41°3′4″N 0°8′1″W
- Country: Spain
- Autonomous community: Aragon
- Province: Teruel
- Comarca: Bajo Aragón
- Judicial district: Alcañiz

Government
  - Mayor (2019– ): Ignacio Urquizu Sancho (PSOE-Aragón)

Area
  - Total: 472.12 km^{2} (182.29 sq mi)
- Elevation: 340 m (1,120 ft)

Population (2025-01-01)
  - Total: 16,505
  - Density: 34.959/km^{2} (90.544/sq mi)
- Demonym: Alcañizano
- Time zone: UTC+1 (CET)
  - Summer (DST): UTC+2 (CEST)
- Postal code: 44600
- Website: alcaniz.es

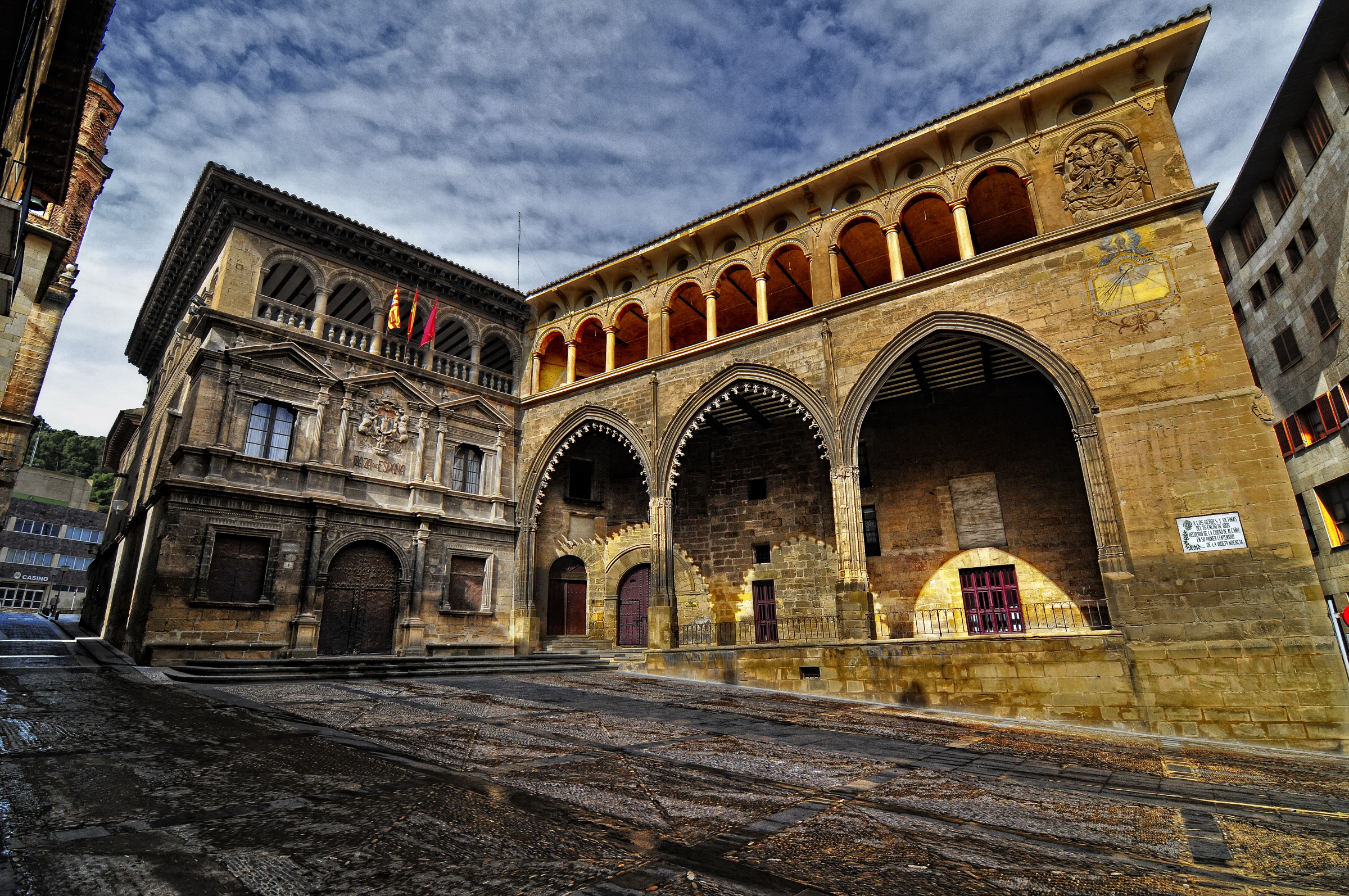
Plaza de España

Alcañiz (Spanish: [alkaˈɲiθ]) is a town and municipality of Teruel province in the autonomous community of Aragon, Spain. The town is located on the banks of the river Guadalope. Alcañiz is the unofficial capital of the Lower Aragon historical region. It lies some 113 km (70 mi) from Teruel, the provincial capital, and 92 km (57 mi) from Zaragoza, the capital of Aragon.

Alcañiz is the capital of the Bajo Aragón comarca and the second city in the province after Teruel.

== History ==
The current settlement of Alcañiz dates to the Islamic era in Spain. It was captured by the Christian troops of Alfonso I of Aragon in 1119, but was later taken back by the Moors. It was conquered again by count Ramon Berenguer IV of Barcelona in 1157, and again lost, until it was finally recaptured by his son Alfonso II of Aragon. In 1179 the latter gave the town to the military Order of Calatrava.

On 23 May 1809 during the Peninsular War, the Battle of Alcañiz was fought between a Spanish force led by General Blake and French troops commanded by General Suchet. During French occupation Suchet made an administrative territorial division of Aragon by which Alcañiz became the capital of the province of Alcañiz. This short-lived province briefly unified the Lower Aragon historical region. Alcañiz, however was bypassed in the 1833 territorial division of Spain and later attempts to create an Alcañiz Province were not successful.

Formerly there was a railway line between Alcañiz and Tortosa, offering a new gateway to the sea for Aragon through this town. Construction work began in 1891, but it was haphazard and the first trains between Alcañiz and Tortosa began only in 1942. The last stretch between Tortosa and Sant Carles de la Ràpita was never completed before the line was terminated by Renfe in 1973.

=== Jewish history ===
In 1380, a few Jewish families, scattered in the surroundings of the town, joined to create a community, which was under the jurisdiction of the Order of Calatrava. During the massacres of 1391, the Jewish community in town was protected. Alcañiz was the hometown of Joshua Lorki, a converted Jew who initiated the religious Disputation of Tortosa between Christian and Jewish scholars. A law was forced on the town Jewish community, imposing a fine on any Jew who wished to move out of the city.

== Demography ==
The population in Alcañiz is 15,939 people in 2018.

Demographic evolution
1857	1860	1877	1897	1900	1910	1920	1930	1940	1950	1960	1970	1981	1991	2001	2011	2019
7,522	7,619	7,327	7,433	7,699	8,397	8,596	8,961	8,691	9,812	10,166	10,851	11,639	12,820	13,431	16,402	15,947

== Climate ==
Alcañiz has a cold semi-arid climate (Köppen: BSk) with moderately cool winters with some rain to hot, mostly dry summers with little rain and thunderstorms. Heavy rains happen in spring and autumn, especially during May, October and November. There is approximately 1 snowy day every year. Some years have no snowfall while others have a few days of snow. Heavy snow is unknown.

Climate data for Alcañiz 340 metres (1,120 ft) above sea level (1991-2020), extremes (1990-present)
Month	Jan	Feb	Mar	Apr	May	Jun	Jul	Aug	Sep	Oct	Nov	Dec	Year
Record high °C (°F)	22.7 (72.9)	23.6 (74.5)	31.2 (88.2)	31.6 (88.9)	35.8 (96.4)	41.2 (106.2)	42.3 (108.1)	41.2 (106.2)	37.5 (99.5)	32.6 (90.7)	26.6 (79.9)	22.3 (72.1)	42.3 (108.1)
Mean daily maximum °C (°F)	11.0 (51.8)	13.0 (55.4)	16.8 (62.2)	19.5 (67.1)	23.8 (74.8)	29.2 (84.6)	32.1 (89.8)	31.3 (88.3)	26.8 (80.2)	21.3 (70.3)	14.9 (58.8)	11.0 (51.8)	20.9 (69.6)
Daily mean °C (°F)	6.3 (43.3)	7.6 (45.7)	10.6 (51.1)	13.2 (55.8)	17.1 (62.8)	21.9 (71.4)	24.4 (75.9)	24.0 (75.2)	20.0 (68.0)	15.3 (59.5)	9.9 (49.8)	6.5 (43.7)	14.7 (58.5)
Mean daily minimum °C (°F)	1.6 (34.9)	2.2 (36.0)	4.4 (39.9)	6.8 (44.2)	10.3 (50.5)	14.4 (57.9)	16.7 (62.1)	16.6 (61.9)	13.2 (55.8)	9.2 (48.6)	4.8 (40.6)	2.0 (35.6)	8.5 (47.3)
Record low °C (°F)	−6.7 (19.9)	−7.1 (19.2)	−9.5 (14.9)	−2.4 (27.7)	0.8 (33.4)	4.9 (40.8)	8.7 (47.7)	8.6 (47.5)	4.0 (39.2)	−0.5 (31.1)	−6.8 (19.8)	−7.6 (18.3)	−9.5 (14.9)
Average precipitation mm (inches)	22.7 (0.89)	16.8 (0.66)	25.8 (1.02)	35.0 (1.38)	43.5 (1.71)	24.4 (0.96)	13.4 (0.53)	14.8 (0.58)	21.9 (0.86)	31.7 (1.25)	29.1 (1.15)	15.8 (0.62)	294.9 (11.61)
Average precipitation days (≥ 1 mm)	3.5	3.0	4.2	5.4	5.7	3.6	2.3	2.7	2.9	4.1	4.4	3.3	45.1
Source: Agencia Estatal de Meteorologia

== Main sights ==
Sights in Alcañiz include:

- Castle of the Calatravos (Parador since 1968)
- Church of Santa María la Mayor, including a medieval Gothic tower.
- Lonja de Alcañiz
- Casa Consistorial (Town Hall; 1565–70)
- Underground passage; these goes from Town Hall up to the Church and the calle mayor.

A few kilometers from the city are the rock paintings of the Val del Charco del Agua Amarga, included in the UNESCO Heritage Site Rock Art of the Mediterranean Basin on the Iberian Peninsula .

== Notable people ==
- Domingo Andrés (1525–1599), humanist, writer and poet
- Concepción Gimeno de Flaquer (1850-1919), writer, editor, feminist, traveler

== See also ==
- Ciudad del Motor de Aragón
- Lower Aragon
- List of municipalities in Teruel
