= Pascale Domingo =

French combustion physicist

Pascale Domingo is a French combustion physicist and aerothermochemist who uses large eddy simulation to study flames and reactive flows in turbulent fuel-air mixtures. She is a director of research for the French National Centre for Scientific Research (CNRS), and is affiliated with the Complexe de Recherche Interprofessionnel en Aérothermochimie (CORIA), a joint research unit of CNRS, the University of Rouen Normandy, and the Institut national des sciences appliquées de Rouen.

== Education and career ==
Domingo completed a Ph.D. in physics in 1991 at the University of Rouen Normandy, with the dissertation Modélisation numérique de plasmas en écoulement supervised by Dany Vandromme. She was a postdoctoral researcher in 1992 in the Aeronautics and Astronautics department of Stanford University.

== Recognition ==
Domingo was elected to the 2019 class of Fellows of The Combustion Institute, "for excellent contributions to the numerical simulation of flames including hybrid combustion regimes predicting major and minor chemical species".
