= Domingo F. Periconi =

Domingo Francisco Mario Periconi (born January 22, 1883, in Reggio Calabria, Italy) was an artist. His commercial specialty was Western themes, and his work can be found on the front cover of many pulp magazines of the 1930s.

Periconi immigrated to the United States in 1904 and settled in Manhattan, New York City. He was classically trained at the National Academy of Fine Arts School in New York City and painted in many mediums. His wife, Elizabeth Millspaugh, was born about 1885 in New York. They were married in 1910. Domingo had one son, Eugene Alexis Periconi, who was also an artist.

In addition to pulp fiction magazine covers, Periconi painted numerous landscapes of California as well as upstate New York. His paintings were always signed “DFM Periconi.”

His work can be seen on the front cover of the pulp magazine Jungle Stories, including Sangroo the Sun-God and The Trumpeting Herd.

Domingo Periconi was also the cover artist of the following: Ace-High Magazine Aug. #1 1931; Ace-High Magazine Oct. #1 1931; Wild West Weekly Feb. 6, 1932; Ace-High Magazine Mar. #1 1932; Ace-High Magazine May 1932; Ace-High Magazine Sept. 1932; and Ace-High Magazine Jan. #1 1933.
