= Domingo Larrainzar =

Spanish footballer

Txomin Larrainzar
Personal information
- Full name: Domingo José Larrainzar Santamaría
- Date of birth: 8 September 1969 (age 57)
- Place of birth: Pamplona, Spain
- Height: 1.79 m (5 ft 10 1/2 in)
- Position: Centre-back

Youth career
- Osasuna

Senior career*
Years	Team	Apps	(Gls)
1988–1990	Osasuna B	61	(4)
1989–1996	Osasuna	152	(4)
1996–2002	Málaga	136	(6)
2002–2003	Levante	5	(0)
Total		354	(14)

International career
1985–1986	Spain U16	5	(1)
1987	Spain U17	2	(0)
1986–1988	Spain U18	14	(0)
1988–1989	Spain U19	5	(0)
1989–1990	Spain U20	5	(0)
1990–1991	Spain U21	2	(0)
1991–1992	Spain U23	7	(0)
- * Club domestic league appearances and goals

Domingo José Larrainzar Santamaría (Txomin Larrainzar in Basque; born 8 September 1969) is a Spanish former professional footballer who played mainly as a central defender.

His younger brother Iñigo, often referred to as Larrainzar II, was also a footballer, and both played at Osasuna.

== Club career ==
Larrainzar was born in Pamplona. A product of hometown CA Osasuna's youth ranks, he totalled seven La Liga appearances from 1988 to 1990. In his third season he helped with 14 games and one goal to help the Navarrese club to finish fourth and qualify for the UEFA Cup– although younger, his brother Iñigo was already an essential member of the squad.

With Osasuna in the Segunda División, Larrainzar dropped down to Segunda División B and signed for Málaga CF, helping the side to return to the top flight in just two years. Although never an undisputed starter, he featured regularly.

In 2002–03, prior to Málaga's victory in the UEFA Intertoto Cup, Larrainzar returned to the second tier with Levante UD, but retired at the end of the campaign at the age of 33.

== Honours ==
Spain U16

- UEFA European Under-16 Championship: 1986
