= Kan Thonglaw =

Thai National Artist (1910–1988)

- กั้น ทองหล่อ
- Born: December 17, 1910; Ban Nam Krajai, Phawong Subdistrict, Mueang Songkhla District, Songkhla Province, Thailand
- Died: May 14, 1988 (aged 77)
- Occupations: Nang talung performer
- Years active: 1923–1988

Kan Thonglaw (Thai: กั้น ทองหล่อ, RTGS: Gun Thonglaw, pronounced [kˈan θˈɒŋɡlɔːː]; December 17, 1910 – May 14, 1988) was a Thai Nang Talung performer and was awarded as the National Artist in 1986.

== Early life ==
Kan Thonglaw was born on December 17, 1910, in Ban Nam Krajai, Phawong Subdistrict, Mueang Songkhla District, Songkhla Province. He is the second out of six children of Khong Thonglaw and his wife, Chum Thonglaw who was from Falami, Pak Phayun district, Phatthalung Province.

His name Kan came from when his dad was working with a French architect to build a railway for Chulalongkorn. He asks the French architect to go back home to visit his wife which is about to give birth. When he arrived home, his wife didn't give birth yet, so he decided to return, but there was a storm that rain down three times in a row, blocking his way to go to work. After the rain stopped. His wife already gave birth, so he named his child กั้น meaning block.

== Career ==
Thonglaw finished highschool at Mahavajiravudh Songkhla School. At that time, he started getting interested in Nang Talung at the age of 13. He performed Nang Talung around his town, which got a lot of popularity. He ordained himself as a monk for two years, and then later became a teacher. People begged him to perform Nang Thalung again, which he did and started performing Nang Talung for 60 years. In 1986, he was awarded as the National Artist.

== Personal life ==
Thonglaw has three wives, Chin who has one child, Gim Lieng has one child, and Sui Hieng has two children with him.

== Death ==
Thonglaw passed away by old age on May 14, 1988, at the age of 77.
