= Wichian Khamcharoen =

Thai songwriter

Wichian Khamcharoen วิเชียร คำเจริญ National Artist of Thailand
- Also known as: Lop Burirat
- Born: 12 April 1939; Lopburi Province, Thailand
- Died: 10 December 2016 (aged 77) Bangkok
- Genre: Luk Thung
- Occupation: Singer-songwriter
- Years active: 1959–2016
- Formerly of: Pumpuang Duangjan

Wichian Khamcharoen (Thai: วิเชียร คำเจริญ) (12 April 1939 — 10 December 2016) or Lop Burirat (Thai: ลพ บุรีรัตน์) was a Thai Luk thung songwriter. He was a regular songwriter for Thai Luk thung singer Pumpuang Duangjan. His songs include "Nad Phop Na Amphoe", "Krasae Khao Ma Si", "Uhue Lor Jang", "Nguen Na Mee Mai", "Amija Tinger", "Noo Mairoo", "Khoe Hai Ruay", etc. He was awarded National Artist of Thailand in 2005.

== Early life ==
He was born in Lopburi Province. He finished educated in Primary 4. He loved music and song, and he dreamed of becoming a songwriter.

== Career ==
He went to Bangkok and joined Luk thung band. In 1989, he met with Praiboon Butrkhan and enrolled to study as a songwriter. His first song is "Kod Mon Non Pher" (sung by Tul Thongjai). After that, he joined Chularat Luk thung band as their songwriter. He then went solo. He became popular as the regular songwriter of Pumpuang Duangjan from 1980 until Pumpuang's death in 1992. He also composed songs for Yodrak Salakjai ("Sam Sip Yang Jaew"), Sornphet Sornsuphan ("Jai Ja Khad") and Jintara Poonlarp ("Jod Mai Lay Chabab"), too.

He died on 10 December 2016, age 77.

== Awards ==
- 2005 – National Artist of Thailand
- 2013 – Fourth Class of the Order of the Direkgunabhorn
