= Rabam Chiangsaen =

Thai dance

Rabam Chiengsaen is a Thai dance from the set of Archaeological Dances, a creation of Dhanit Yupho, who, during his time as the Director General of the Fine Arts Department, presented this dance to His Majesty The King Bhumibol Adulyadej on May 25, 1967, on the occasion of the opening of a new building at the National Museum. Chiengsaen Dance is the fourth in the set and belongs to the period between 17 and 25 Centuries (Buddhist eras). The choreography is based on evidence found on various engraved stones, and was the work of Archarn Lamoon Yamakupt and ArcharnCharley Sukvanich, experts in Thai classical dance of the College of Dramatic Arts. Fine Arts Department. The music is of the northern, Laotian and north - eastern flavors combined, and was composed by Archarn Montri Tramod, the Thai classical music expert of the Fine Arts Department.
