= Chalerm =

Chalerm (Thai: เฉลิม) is a Thai masculine given name. People with the name include:

- Chalerm Yoovidhya (born 1950), billionaire businessman, co-owner of Red Bull GmbH
- Chalerm Yubamrung (born 1947), politician
- Chalerm Prommas (1896–1975), medical doctor
- Chalerm Buathang (1910–1987), musician and lyricist
