= Fua Haripitak =

Thai artist

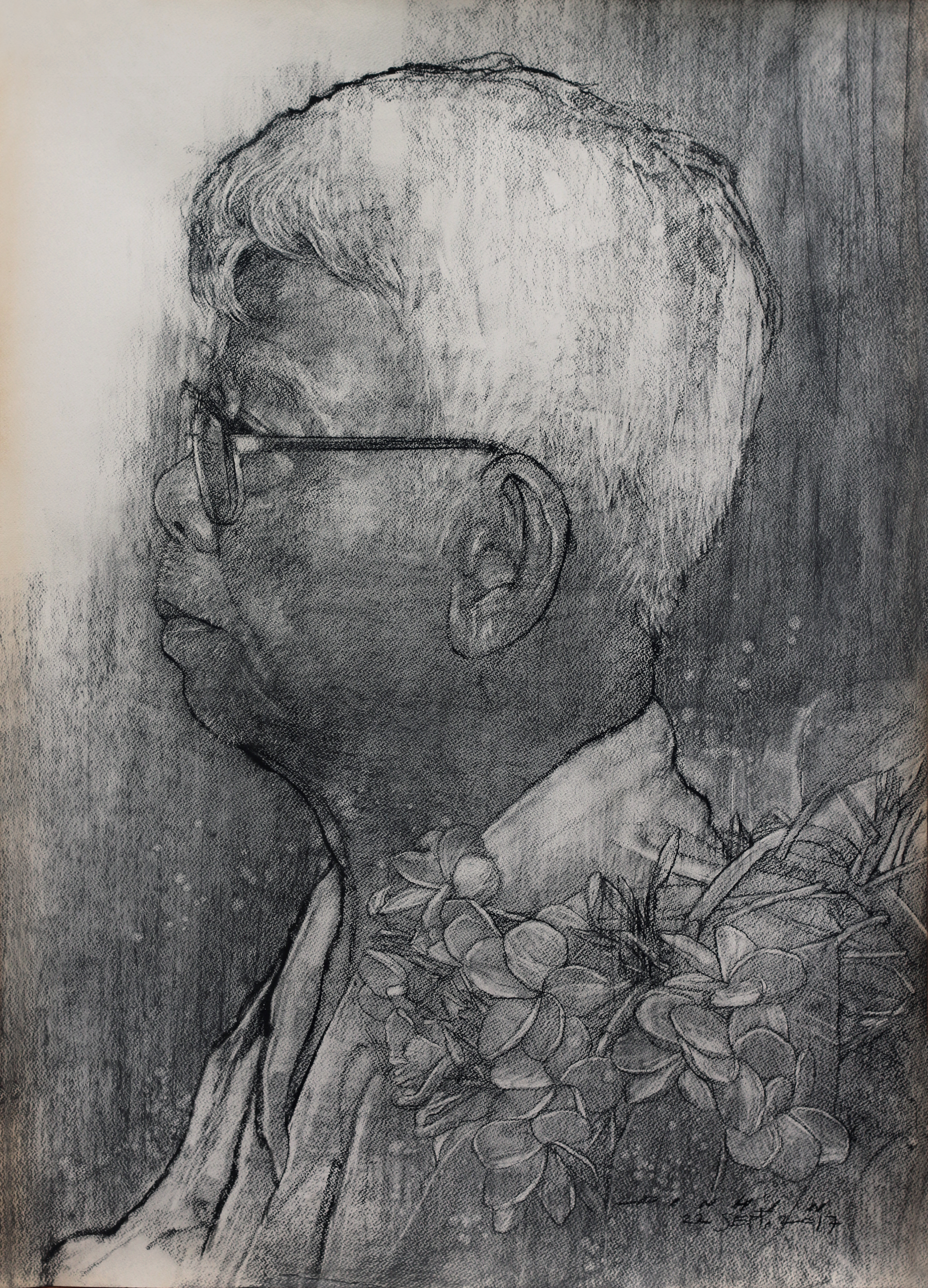
- Born: April 22, 1910; Thonburi, Bangkok, Thailand
- Died: October 19, 1993 (aged 83)
- Occupation: Artist

Fua Haripitak (Thai: เฟื้อ หริพิทักษ์) (22 April 1910 – 19 October 1993) was a Thai artist.

== Biography ==
Fua was born on 22 April 1910 in Thonburi, the son of a court painter who had served under Phya Anusat Chitrakorn.

He began study at Bangkok's Poh Chang School of Arts and Crafts in 1932, continued to the School of Fine Arts (now Silpakorn University) in 1936, and received a scholarship from Thanomsakdi Kridakorn to study at Visva-Bharati University in West Bengal, India. He was influenced by the works of Rabindranath Tagore, the founder of Visva-Bharati University. Upon the outbreak of World War II, Fua was interned for the duration of the war by the British authorities and would not return home to Thailand until 1946. While interned, Fua executed a tempera painting titled Japanese Internment Camp, Purana Qila which the National Museum of Modern Art, Tokyo described as "one of the earliest examples of Asian cubism." Many of Fua's early works at the School of Fine Arts were destroyed during World War II; among his surviving early works was an oil painting of his grandmother holding a cat, titled My Grand Mother (1938).

From 1954 to 1955, he studied at the Academy of Fine Art in Rome (Accademia di Belle Arti di Roma) under a scholarship from the Italian government. He won gold medals at the Annual Exhibition of Thai Art three times, in 1949, 1950, and 1957.

While at the School of Fine Arts, Fua was a student of Silpa Bhirasri, who said in praise of Fua's 1959 solo show:

This young student was most anxious to learn and he did so with intense seriousness. What compelled me to admire him was his exceptionally remarkable drawing abilities. As drawing is the grammar of art, I was sure that one day this young man would become a real artist.

Along with Silpa Bhirasri and Hem Vejakorn, Fua Haripitak was appointed to judge a 1961 art contest hosted by the Tourist Organization (now the Tourism Authority of Thailand) and presided over by Prime Minister Sarit Thanarat. He was a professor at Silpakorn University for twenty-eight years.

In addition to completing his own paintings, Fua dedicated his efforts to the preservation of classical Thai murals. Later in his career, Fua was appointed to lead the restoration of the archive building at Wat Rakhang, a twelve-year process that was greatly injurious to his health. The project was completed in 1982. His citation for the Magsaysay Award in 1983 specifically highlighted his accomplishment in "preserving and teaching a younger generation art forms that distinguish Thailand's unique graphic and architectural heritage."

Fua's health continued to deteriorate, with the strain of the restoration project reportedly resulting in partial paralysis of his face and right arm, and in 1991 he was admitted to Siriraj Hospital. He died in October 1993 due to inflamed blood vessels of the brain.

== Awards ==
- 1980 – Honorary doctoral degree in fine arts, Silpakorn University.
- 1983 – Magsaysay Award for public service.
- 1985 – Named National Artist in the field of Fine Art / Visual Art.
- 1990 – Recognized by the Thai government as an Outstanding Cultural Conservator.
