= Chusri Sakunkaew =

Thai National Artist (1912–2005)

- ชูศรี สกุลแก้ว
- Born: September 19, 1912; Ban Khamin, Bangkok Noi district, Thailand
- Died: May 11, 2005 (aged 92); Somdech Phra Pinklao Hospital, Thailand
- Occupation: Puppeteer
- Years active: 1920–2005

Chusri Sakunkaew (Thai: เชูศรี สกุลแก้ว, RTGS: Chusi Skunkaeo, pronounced [t͡ʃˈʌsɹi sˈakəŋkˌiːwːː]; September 19, 1912 – May 11, 2005) was a Thai puppeteer and actress. She was awarded as the National Artist in 1986.

== Life and career ==
Chusri Sakunkaew was born on September 19, 1912, inside a puppet factory near Ban Khamin, Bangkok Noi district. She is the daughter of Piek Prasertkun, a comedian and puppeteer, and his wife, Min Prasertkun, an actress for Phrajao Chertchom. She starts learning how to perform with her aunt at the age of 7. Other than being a puppeteer, she also learn how to play Krap and Sor.

In 1955, Sakunkaew made her first appearance in the Thai television, she was performing Phra Aphai Mani with her dad. After her father's death in 1964, she started performing solo for 18 years until the Fine Arts Department recognized her and started a show for her to perform at Thammasat University. She als got to perform at universities in London and other cities. In 1986, she was awarded as the National Artist.

== Death ==
Sakunkaew passed away on May 11, 2005, at Somdech Phra Pinklao Hospital at the age of 92. Her funeral was held on November 1, 2005, by Princess Sirindhorn at Wat Krueawanwarawihan.
