= Chalood Nimsamer =

Thai artist (1929–2015)

Chalood Nimsamer (Thai: ชลูด นิ่มเสมอ, RTGS: Chalut Nimsamoe; 2 May 1929 – 4 June 2015) was a Thai artist, working in sculpture, painting, drawing and prints. He was named National Artist in visual arts (sculpture) in 1998.

He graduated from the Poh Chang School of Arts and Crafts and received a Bachelor of Arts, First Class Honors (Sculpture) from Silpakorn University. He also earned Diploma of Fine Arts from the Art Institute of Accademia di Belle Arti in Rome, Italy. When he studied at the Silpakorn University, he was the first batch of students of Professor Silpa Bhirasri (The Father of Modern Arts in Thailand). His outstanding work includes the sculpture Olkutra which is displayed in front of the entrance to the Queen Sirikit National Convention Center, the sculpture Silver Bullet Money (photduang) displayed in front of the Kasikorn Bank office and the sculpture Phrabrom Phothisompharn at Huachiew Chalermprakiet University.

== Biography ==
Chalood Nimsamer was born on 2 May 1929 in Thonburi Province.

On 4 June 2015 (86 years old), he died of lung infection at 18:45 at Siriraj Hospital.

He had the knowledge and ability to create valuable works of art including paintings, sculptures and prints. He was a professor of drawing, painting, sculpture, graphic art, composition, color theory, perspective, etc. and also served as Dean of the Faculty of Painting at Silpakorn University. Apart from teaching and administration work, he also created works of art in painting, sculpture, printmaking and mixed media with artistic value. He received a number of awards of gold, silver and bronze medals both at home and abroad. He was honored as an excellent artist of painting at the 10th National Exhibition in 1959.

== Books ==
Apart from creating many creative works of art, he also authored two books:

- การเข้าถึงศิลปะในงานจิตกรรมไทย (1989)—Introduction to Thai mural paintings; companion volume and catalog for an exhibition of photographs of Thai paintings in the Fine Arts
- Composition of Art (องค์ประกอบศิลป์) (1995)—This book was written as a manual for art students and those who want to practice creative visual arts.

== Decorations ==
- Knight Grand Cross (First Class) of the Most Exalted Order of the White Elephant.
- Knight Grand Cross (First Class) of the Most Noble Order of the Crown of Thailand.
- Companion (Fourth Class) of the Most Admirable Order of the Direkgunabhorn.
