= Prayat Pongdam =

Thai artist

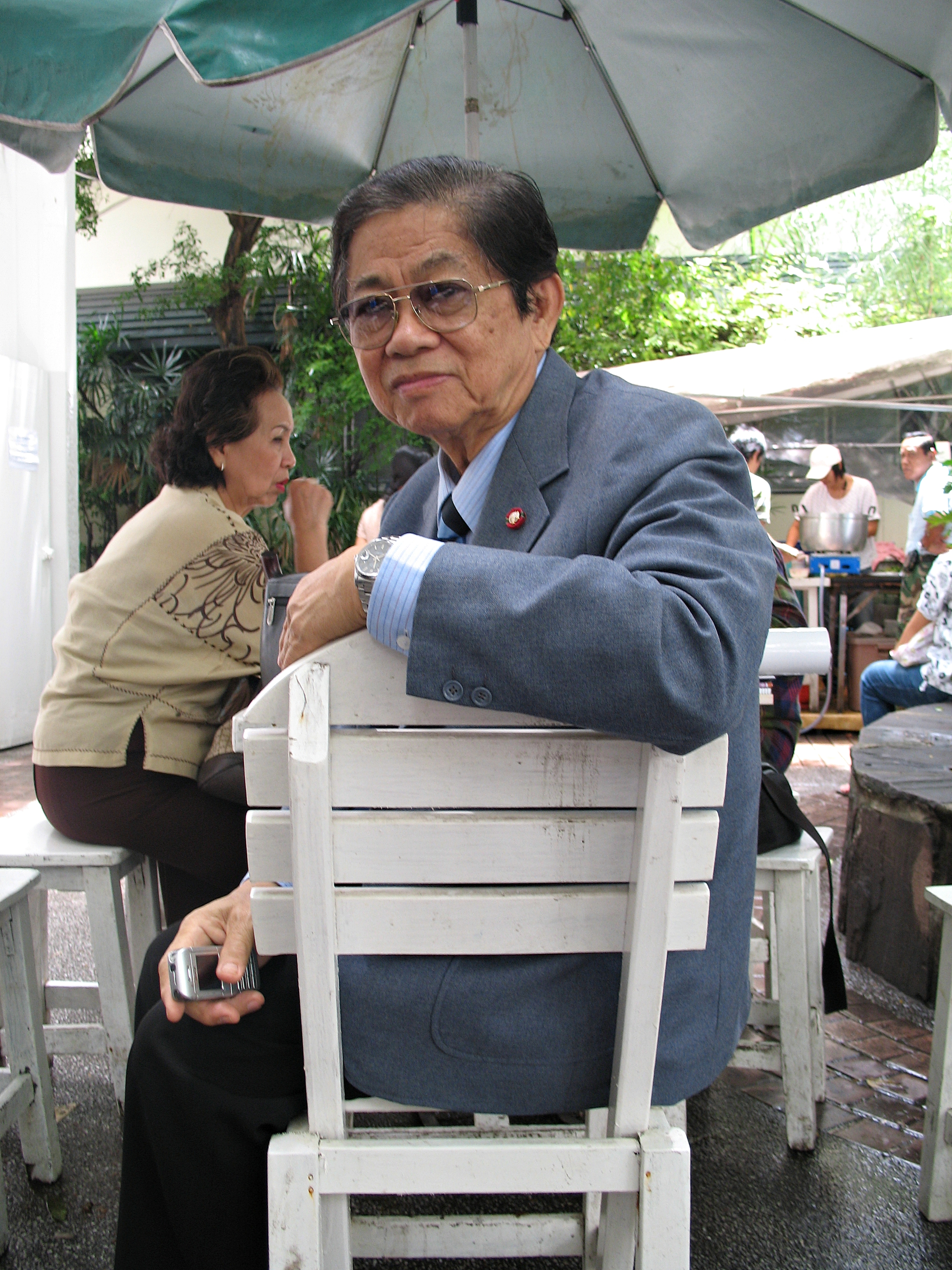
Prayat Pongdam

Prayat Pongdam (October 28, 1934 – 2014) was a Thai artist.

== Biography ==
Prayat Pongdam was born on 28 October 1934 in Sing Buri, Thailand. He attended the Poh-Chang Academy of Arts and Silpakorn University and earned a bachelor's degree in painting. Later, he went to Italy to complete a diploma from L'Accademia di Belle Art, Rome.

He died in 2014 at the age of 79.

== Recognition ==
- National Artist in Printmaking Art (1998)

== Literary works ==
- "Mahajanaka"
