= Thai Prophecy Verse =

17th- or 18th-century Thai poem

"Thai Prophecy Verse" Thai Prophecy Verse (in Thai), Wikidata Q6665250(Thai: เพลงยาวพยากรณ์กรุงศรีอยุธยา, RTGS: Phleng yao phayakon krung si ayutthaya), also the "Long Song Prophecy for Ayutthaya" is a poem forecasting the future of Thailand. It was composed in a similar vein to Maha Supina Jataka, which features the reply of Buddha to King Pasenadi of Kosala about the King's sixteen-fold dream.

The poem was first published in the book Athibai phaen thi phra nakhon si autthaya (Thai: อธิบายแผนที่พระนครศรีอยุธยา, lit. 'Explanations for the Maps of Ayutthaya Kingdom') (Note: Phraya Boranratchathanin (1966), Damrong Rajanubhab (ed.), อธิบายแผนที่พระนครศรีอยุธยากับคำวินิจฉัยของพระยาโบราณราชธานินทร์ (PDF) (in Thai), Teachers' Council of Thailand, Wikidata Q131278665) by Phraya Boranratchathanin (Note: Thai: พระยาโบราณราชธานินทร์ (พร เดชะคุปต์), Governor General of Ayutthaya Monthon and Vice President of the Royal Institute of Thailand at that time). The book was posthumously presented to Rama VI in 1926.

These stanzas exemplify the apocalyptic nature of the poem, and closely reflect the klon verseform of the original:

Monks and laity will be distressed,
Horrors manifest themselves, prevail,
Frenzied slaughter, wars on an awful scale,
As people flail and fall, a surfeit crowd.

Waterways now waterless turn into dusty roads.
Abodes of kings don jungle for their shroud.
Carnivores and lions remain uncowed
Nought else allowed to conquer death's poor plight.

— Page 11; Stanzas 25-26, Long Song Prophecy for Ayutthaya translated by Cushman (Note: Richard D. Cushman (2001). Wyatt, David (ed.). "Translating Thai Poetry: Cushman, and King Narai's "Long Song Prophecy for Ayutthaya"" (PDF). Journal of the Siam Society. 89: 1–11. ISSN 0857-7099. Wikidata Q131267052.)

There are various hypotheses (Note: Srifa Ladavalaya (2006). "Article about Thai Prophecy Verse". Sakul Thai Magazine (in Thai). 2700. Wikidata Q131278614.) about the poem's origin; it is usually assumed to have been composed during the Ayutthaya Period. However, many academics remain unsure of the authorship, even though the poem ends with the statement that "The prediction about the Kingdom by Somdet Phra Narai, King of Nopburi, ends here."

Prince Damrong Rachanuphap, father of the Thai history, explained in "Athibai phaen thi phra nakhon si autthaya" that:

...Pursuant to the footnote of the "Thai Prophecy Verse" stating that it was the composition of Somdet Phra Narai. There are reasonable suspicions that the poem was composed in Ayutthaya Period according to the Testimony of the Fall of Ayutthaya. However, there are no evidences to ensure that they were the composition of Somdet Phra Narai. It is quite strange that the poem was frequently mentioned and chanted by the people since Ayutthaya Period until this Period of Rattanakosin. The poem was normally known as "Phleng yao phuttha thamnai" (Thai: เพลงยาวพุทธทำนาย, lit. 'Long Song Predictions of the Buddha')...

It is asserted in Kham hai kan chao krung kao (Note: Thai: คำให้การชาวกรุงเก่า, lit. 'Testimony by the People from the Old Kingdom') that the poem was composed by King Sanphet VIII (Note: Thai: สมเด็จพระสรรเพชญที่ ๘, romanized: Somdet Phra Sanphet Thi Paet; reigned 1703–1708). Academics often supported this, and suspected that the poem was composed with the royal purpose to use as political psychology. King Sanphet the Eighth might have used the poem to erode public faith and trust that the government could maintain the national security. In present periods, Thai rulers also use this poetic work for political purposes.

Furthermore, it could be surmised that the composer of the poem was a person highly educated in astrology, poetry and psychology, as well as of high rank (including, even, kingship), since producing an unfavorable work like this could be dangerous for a commoner.
