= National Artist (Thailand) =

Title

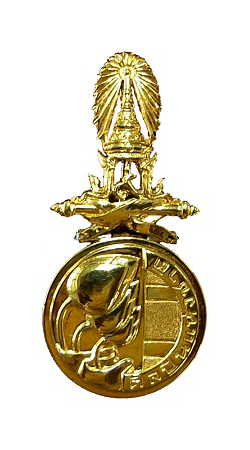
- Awarded for: Exceptional contribution to the arts of Thailand
- Country: Thailand
- Presented by: Office of the National Culture Commission
- First award: 24 February 1985
- Website: art.culture.go.th

The National Artist (Thai: ศิลปินแห่งชาติ, RTGS: Sinlapin Haeng Chat, IPA: [sǐn láʔ pin hɛ̀ːŋ tɕʰâːt]) is a title given annually by the Office of the National Culture Commission of Thailand, recognizing notable Thai artists in the area of intangible cultural heritage such as literature, fine arts, visual arts, applied arts (architecture, design) and performing arts (Thai dance, international dance, puppetry, shadow play, Thai music, international music, drama and film).

Since 1985, the honors have been presented on 24 February, "National Artist Day", in Thailand. The date was chosen because it is the birthdate of Buddha Loetla Nabhalai, or King Rama II, who was an artist himself. In 1986, King Bhumibol Adulyadej, an accomplished musician, photographer, and painter, was named "Supreme Artist".

National artists receive 25,000 baht monthly for life unless the award is retracted. They are also entitled to health insurance, emergency payments, funeral costs, and a stipend of 150,000 baht for writing a biography or autobiography.

The pieces of work perceived of being on the highest level are exhibited in the Supreme Artist Hall.

== List of Thailand national artists ==
=== 1980s ===
Year	Name	Discipline	Source(s)
1985	Kukrit Pramoj	Literature	
1985	Montri Tramote	Performing art (Thai music)	
1985	Paew Snitwongseni	Performing art (Thai dance)	
1985	Fua Haripitak	Fine art, Visual art	
1986	Kanha Khiangsiri	Literature	
1986	Op Chaiyawasu	Literature	
1986	Kan Thonglaw	Performing art (Thai dance)	
1986	Chalerm Buathang	Performing art (Thai music)	
1986	Chusri Sakunkaew	Performing art (Thai dance)	
1986	Tuam Prasidhikul	Performing art (Thai music)	
1986	Thongmak Chantalue	Performing art (Thai dance)	
1986	Thonglaw Tamleytong	Performing art (Thai music)	
1986	Plueng Chairasami	Performing art (Thai dance)	
1986	Puangroi Abhaiwongsa	Performing art (International music)	
1986	Paitoon Kittiwan	Performing art (Thai music)	
1986	Rongpakdee Jarujarana	Performing art (Thai dance)	
1986	Kumma Saeng-ngarm	Fine art, Visual art	
1986	Paitoon Muangsomboon	Fine art, Visual art	
1986	Prasong Patamanuj	Fine art, Visual art	
1986	Saengda Bannasit	Fine art, Visual art	
1986	Heng Sopapong	Fine art, Visual art	
1986	Sompop Pirom	Applied art	
1987	Pin Malakul	Literature	
1987	Charoenchai Sundaravadin	Performing art (Thai music)	
1987	Chaloey Sukavanis	Performing art (Thai dance)	
1987	Chin Silapabanleng	Performing art (Thai music)	
1987	Chailanka Kruasen	Performing art (Thai music)	
1987	Yok Choobua	Performing art (Thai dance)	

Year	Name	Discipline	Source(s)
1987	Vichit Kounavudhi	Performing art (Movie and drama)	
1987	Chit Rianpracha	Visual art	
1987	Payom Sinawat	Fine art, Visual art	
1987	Mod Wongsawad	Fine art, Visual art	
1987	Mitrarun Kasemsri	Visual art, Applied art	
1988	Sukanya Cholasuek	Literature	
1988	Kree Worasarin	Performing art (Thai dance)	
1988	Jamriang Budpradub	Performing art (Thai dance)	
1988	Seri Wangnaitham	Performing art (Thai dance)	
1988	Prasidhi Thavorn	Performing art (Thai music)	
1988	Boonyong Katekong	Performing art (Thai music)	
1988	Samarn Karnjanaphalin	Performing art (International music)	
1988	Sa-nga Arampir	Performing art (International music)	
1988	Wangdee Nima	Performing art (Thai dance)	
1988	Chalerm Nakeerak	Fine art, Visual art	
1988	Poon Kesjamras	Fine art, Visual art	
1988	Piman Moonpramook	Fine art, Visual art	
1989	Angkarn Kalayanapong	Literature	
1989	Yat Changthong	Performing art (Thai dance)	
1989	Pravet Kumut	Performing art (Thai music)	
1989	Prasit Phayomyong	Performing art (International music)	
1989	Sherry Savettanan	Performing art (International music)	
1989	Chin Oramut	Performing art (Thai dance)	
1989	Sanit Ditthapan	Fine art, Visual art	
1989	Praves Limparangsri	Visual art, Applied art	

=== 1990s ===
Year	Name	Discipline	Source(s)
1990	Sakchai Bumrungpong	Literature	
1990	Buaphan Chansri	Performing art (Thai dance)	
1990	Somchai Asanachinda	Performing art (Movie and drama)	
1990	Suthep Wongkamhaeng	Performing art (International music)	
1990	Suwannee Chalanukhro	Performing art (Thai dance)	
1990	Tavee Nanthakwang	Fine art, Visual art	
1991	Suwat Woradilok	Literature	
1991	Ajin Panjapan	Literature	
1991	Sawasdi Tantisuk	Fine art, Visual art	
1991	Ken Dalau	Performing art (Thai dance)	
1991	Boonyang Katekong	Performing art (Thai dance)	
1991	Payong Mukda	Performing art (International music)	
1991	Pensri Poomchoosri	Performing art (International music)	
1992	Khamsing Srinawk	Literature	
1992	Songchart Chuensiri	Performing art (Thai dance)	
1992	Tuen Patayakul	Performing art (Thai music)	
1992	Manratana Srigranont	Performing art (International music)	
1992	Pongsri Woranuch	Performing art (International music)	
1992	Juliam Gingthong	Performing art (Thai dance)	
1992	Kam Gawai	Performing art (Thai dance)	
1992	Prayoon Uluchata	Fine art, Visual art	
1993	Prakhin Xumsai Na Ayudhya	Literature	
1993	Naowarat Pongpaiboon	Literature	
1993	Jamnian Srithaipan	Performing art (Thai music)	
1993	Chalee Intharawijit	Performing art (Movie and drama)	
1993	Sudchit Anantakul	Performing art (Thai music)	
1993	Khader Verdeng	Performing art (Thai dance)	
1993	Chaweewan Phanthu	Performing art (Thai music)	
1993	Pinit Suwanaboon	Fine art, Visual art	
1993	Usni Pramoj	Performing art (International music)	
1993	Prayoon Yomyiem	Performing art (Thai dance)	
1993	Pinyo Suwankiri	Visual art, Applied art	
1994	Usni Pramoj	Performing art (International music)	
1994	Prayoon Yomyiam	Performing art (Thai dance)	
1994	Pinyo Suwankiri	Visual art, Applied art	
1995	Rong Wongsawan	Literature	
1995	Thaweep Voradiloke	Literature	
1995	Khamphai Nuping	Performing art (Thai dance)	
1995	Jang Klayseethong	Performing art (Thai music)	
1995	Pruang Chuenprayoth	Performing art (International music)	
1995	Somsian Phantong	Performing art (Thai music)	
1995	Soi Damjam	Performing art (Thai music)	
1995	Sawong Supsamruay	Performing art (Movie and drama)	
1995	Amnuey Neramit	Performing art (Movie and drama)	
1995	Chitt Chongmankhong	Fine art, Visual art	

Year	Name	Discipline	Source(s)
1996	Srifa Mahawan	Literature	
1996	Anusorn Mongkolkarn	Performing art (Movie and drama)	
1996	Somkuan Krachangsart	Performing art (Movie and drama)	
1996	Ruangthong Thongluntom	Performing art (International music)	
1996	Kliew Setkit	Performing art (Thai dance)	
1996	Boonlert Nartpinit	Performing art (Thai dance)	
1996	Sakorn Yang-keawsot	Performing art (Thai dance)	
1996	Chansom Saithara	Performing art (Thai music)	
1996	Yai Wisetpolklang	Performing art (Thai music)	
1996	Chumraung Vichienket	Fine art, Visual art	
1997	Chatchai Visessuwanpoom	Literature	
1997	Sompong Pongmitr	Performing art (Movie and drama)	
1997	Malaiwal Boonyaratawej	Performing art (International music)	
1997	Pinit Chaisuwan	Performing art (Thai music)	
1997	Surapol Tonawanik	Performing art (International music)	
1997	Thongbai Ruangnont	Performing art (Thai dance)	
1997	Waiphot Phetsuphan	Performing art (International music)	
1997	Boonpeng Phaiphiewchai	Performing art (Thai dance)	
1997	Im Chitphakdee	Performing art (Thai dance)	
1997	Kamol Tasananchalee	Fine art, Visual art	
1998	Vasit Dejkunjorn	Literature	
1998	Churee Osiri	Performing art (Movie and drama)	
1998	Bencharong Thanakoset	Performing art (Thai music)	
1998	Prasidh Silpabanleng	Performing art (International music)	
1998	Siriwat Ditsayanand	Performing art (Thai dance)	
1998	Chaichana Boonnachot	Performing art (International music)	
1998	Charin Nandanagara	Performing art (International music)	
1998	Piyaphan Snitwongse	Performing art (International music)	
1998	Khraukaew Na Chiang Mai	Performing art (Thai dance)	
1998	Chalood Nimsamer	Fine art, Visual art	
1998	Prayat Pongdam	Fine art, Visual art	
1998	Arvuth Ngernchuglin	Visual art	
1998	Sumet Jumsai na Ayudhya	Applied art	
1999	Supa Sirisingh	Literature	
1999	Thae Prakas-vudhisarn	Performing art (Movie and drama)	
1999	Marasi Isranggura Na Ayutthaya	Performing art (Movie and drama)	
1999	Cheu Dontriros	Performing art (Thai music)	
1999	Somphan Chotana	Performing art (Thai dance)	
1999	Samphan Phan-manee	Performing art (Thai dance)	
1999	Somnuke Thongma	Performing art (International music)	
1999	Chin Faithes	Performing art (International music)	
1999	Manit Phu-Aree	Fine art, Visual art	
1999	Damrong Wongse-Upparaj	Fine art, Visual art	
1999	Inson Wongsam	Fine art, Visual art	

=== 2000s ===
Year	Name	Discipline	Source(s)
2000	Ussiri Dhammachote	Literature	
2000	Mongkol Seangsawang	Performing arts (Thai music)	
2000	Chakrabhand Posayakrit	Fine arts	
2000	Ruetai Jaijongrak	Applied arts	
2001	Kumpoon Boontawee	Literature	
2001	Chatrichalerm Yukol	Performing arts (Movie and drama)	
2001	Thawan Duchanee	Fine arts	
2001	Pradith Yuvapukka	Visual arts, Applied arts	
2002	Sujit Wongthes	Literature	
2002	Chiras Ardnarong	Performing arts (Thai music)	
2002	Prakit Buabusaya	Fine arts, Visual arts	
2002	Nithi Sathapitanon	Applied arts	
2003	Karuna Kusiralai	Literature	
2003	Prom Bunrit	Performing arts (Thai dance)	
2003	Pichai Niran	Fine arts, Visual art	
2003	Wanida Puangsunthorn	Visual arts, Applied art	
2004	Vinita Diteeyont	Literature	
2004	Chart Korbjitti	Literature	
2004	Rakop Pothiwes	Performing arts (Thai dance)	
2004	Chintana Palkawong na Ayudhya	Performing arts (International music)	
2004	Pairat Sungwaributr	Performing arts (Movie and drama)	
2004	Piboon Musikpodok	Fine arts, Visual art	
2004	Sant Sarakornborirak	Fine arts, Visual art	
2004	Jullatat Kitibud	Visual arts, Applied art	
2005	Prayom Songthong	Literature	
2005	Sathaporn Srisatjang	Literature	
2005	Pratuang Emjaroen	Fine arts	
2005	Tawee Rujaneekorn	Fine arts	
2005	Chalard Songserm	Performing art	
2005	Wichian Khamcharoen a.k.a. Lop Burirat	Performing arts	
2005	Suphachai Jansuwan	Performing arts	
2005	Manop Yarana	Performing arts	
2005	Samran Kerdpon	Performing arts	

Year	Name	Discipline	Source(s)
2006	Manee Payomyong	Literature	
2006	Rawi Bhavilai	Literature	
2006	Kiettisak Chanonnart	Visual arts	
2006	Nonthiwan Chantanaphalin	Visual arts	
2006	Decha Boonkham	Applied arts	
2006	Somthavil Urassayanan	Applied arts	
2006	Kiettipong Kanchanaphee	Performing arts (international music)	
2006	Kalong Peunghongkham	Performing art (Thai music)	
2006	Suchart Subsin	Performing art (Thai dance)	
2007	Decha Warachun	Visual arts	
2007	Yanyong Olarachin	Visual arts	
2007	Krisda Arunvongse na Ayudhya	Visual arts	
2007	Charn Buabangsorn	Performing arts (Thai music)	
2007	Nakarin Chathong	Performing arts	
2007	Kovit Anakechai	Literature	
2008	Adul Jantrasak	Literature	
2008	Ithipol Thangchalok	Fine arts	
2008	Thanadsri Svastivatana	Performing arts	
2008	Sorapong Chatree	Performing arts	
2008	Prasit Pinkaew	Performing arts	
2008	Viraphan Voklang	Performing arts	
2008	Siri Witchawet	Performing arts	
2009	Preecha Thaothong	Visual arts (painting)	
2009	Ong-ard Satrabhandhu	Visual arts (contemporary architecture)	
2009	Penpan Sittitrai	Visual arts (carving)	
2009	Woranan Chatchawaltipakorn	Visual arts (photography)	
2009	Seksan Prasertkul	Literature	
2009	Jatuporn Rattanawaraha	Performing arts (dramatic arts – khon)	
2009	Uthai Kaewla-iad	Performing arts (Thai music)	
2009	Manthana Morakul	Performing arts (Thai music – singing)	
2009	Prayong Chuenyen	Performing arts (Thai music – composition)	

=== 2010s ===
Year	Name	Discipline	Source(s)
2010	Thongchai Rakpathum	Visual arts (painting)	
2010	Phao Suwansaksri	Visual arts (Thai architecture)	
2010	Pranom Tapang	Visual arts (traditional weaving)	
2010	Sombat Plainoi	Literature (short story)	
2010	Surachai Chantimatorn	Literature (short story, non-fiction, poetry)	
2010	Kuan Tuanyok	Performing arts (Thai music)	
2010	Choochart Pitaksakorn	Performing arts (international music)	
2010	Pissamai Vilaisak	Performing arts (movie and drama)	
2010	Suprawat Pattamasoot	Performing arts (movie and drama director and performer)	
2011	Chalermchai Kositpipat	Visual arts (painting)	
2011	Mathar Bunnag	Applied arts (architecture)	
2011	Tongreung Eamaot	Visual arts (sculpture)	
2011	Ratna Phuangprayong	Performing arts (Thai dance)	
2011	Nakhon Thanomsap	Performing arts (international and Thai music)	
2011	Setha Sirichaya	Performing arts (international and Thai music)	
2011	Sodsai Pantoomkomol	Performing arts (drama)	
2011	Prabhassorn Sevikul	Literature	
2011	Suchart Sawasdsri	Literature	
2012	Thatsani Khun Thong	Performing arts (Thai music and dance)	
2012	Khlaonoi Rotchanamethakun	Performing arts (Film and drama)	
2012	Phan Tho Wichit	Performing arts (international music)	
2012	Sano Luangsunthon	Performing arts (Thai music)	
2012	Manat Pitisan	Performing arts (international music)	
2012	Somsuan Phromsawang	Performing arts (Thai music)	
2012	Dokdin Kanyamarn	Performing arts (film)	
2012	Buason Thanombun	Performing arts (Thai music and dance)	
2012	Makut Araruedi	Literature	
2012	Wimon Siriphaibun	Literature	
2012	Nongchanai Prinyathawat	Literature	
2012	Aree Suttiphan	Visual arts (painting)	
2012	Wichok Mukdamni	Visual arts (mixed media)	

Year	Name	Discipline	Source(s)
2012	Satsatrachan Khemrat	Visual arts (sculpture)	
2013	Chaloem Muangphraesi	Performing arts (Thai music)	
2013	Chalong Pakdeevijit	Performing arts (film & television - director & executive producer)	
2013	Yuenyong Opakul	Performing arts (international and Thai music)	
2013	Nitya Rakkaen	Performing arts (Thai music)	
2013	Charoen Malarot	Literature	
2013	Win Lyovarin	Literature	
2013	Ramphaiphan Suwannasan	Literature	
2013	Thiraphon Niyom	Applied arts (architecture)	
2013	Chuang Munphinit	Visual arts (painting)	
2014	Patravadi Meechuton	Performing arts (drama)	
2014	Sa-Ard Piempongsan	Performing arts (film)	
2014	Pongsak Chantaruka	Performing arts (Thai music)	
2014	Sirichaichan Fakjamroon	Performing arts (Thai music)	
2014	Dusadee Boonthasanakul	Performing arts (international music)	
2014	Narong Chanphum	Performing arts (puppetry)	
2014	Panya Vijinthanasarn	Visual arts (sculpture)	
2014	Chavalit Soemprungsuk	Visual arts (painting)	
2014	Chamaiporn Bangkombang	Literature	
2014	Nij Hincheeranan	Applied arts (architecture)	
2014	Charun Angsavanond	Applied arts (interior design)	
2014	Boonchuay Hiranwit	Applied arts (silversmithing)	
2015			
2016	Sombat Metanee	Performing arts (film)	
2016	Thanis Sriklindee	Performing arts (international music)	
2017			
2018	Petchara Chaowarat	Performing arts	
2018	Wiroj Weerawattananon	Performing arts	
2018	Kan Chaowapong	Performing arts	
2018	Sukhon Pornpiroon	Performing arts	
2018	Prapas Cholsaranon	Performing arts	
2018	Somsuk Kanjaruk	Performing arts	
2018	Shin Prasong	Visual arts	
2018	Parin Tantisuk	Visual arts	
2018	Kampun Srisai	Visual arts	
2018	Kongsak Yutavesi	Visual arts	
2018	Chamlong Fangcholjit	Literature	
2018	Saneh Sangsuk	Literature	
2019	Janaprakal Chandruang	Performing arts	

=== 2020s ===
Year	Name	Discipline	Source(s)
2021	Sala Khunnawut	Performing arts	
2022	Thongchai McIntyre	Performing arts	
2022	Somtow Sucharitkul	Performing arts	

== See also ==
- Cinema of Thailand
- Culture of Thailand
- Dance of Thailand
- Music of Thailand
- S.E.A. Write Award
- Silpathorn Award
