= Tawee Rujaneekorn =

Thai artist

Tawee Rujaneekorn (born October 10, 1934) (Thai: ทวี รัชนีกร) is a Thai artist. After 5 years of national awards, he was in 2005 named a National Artist of Thailand.

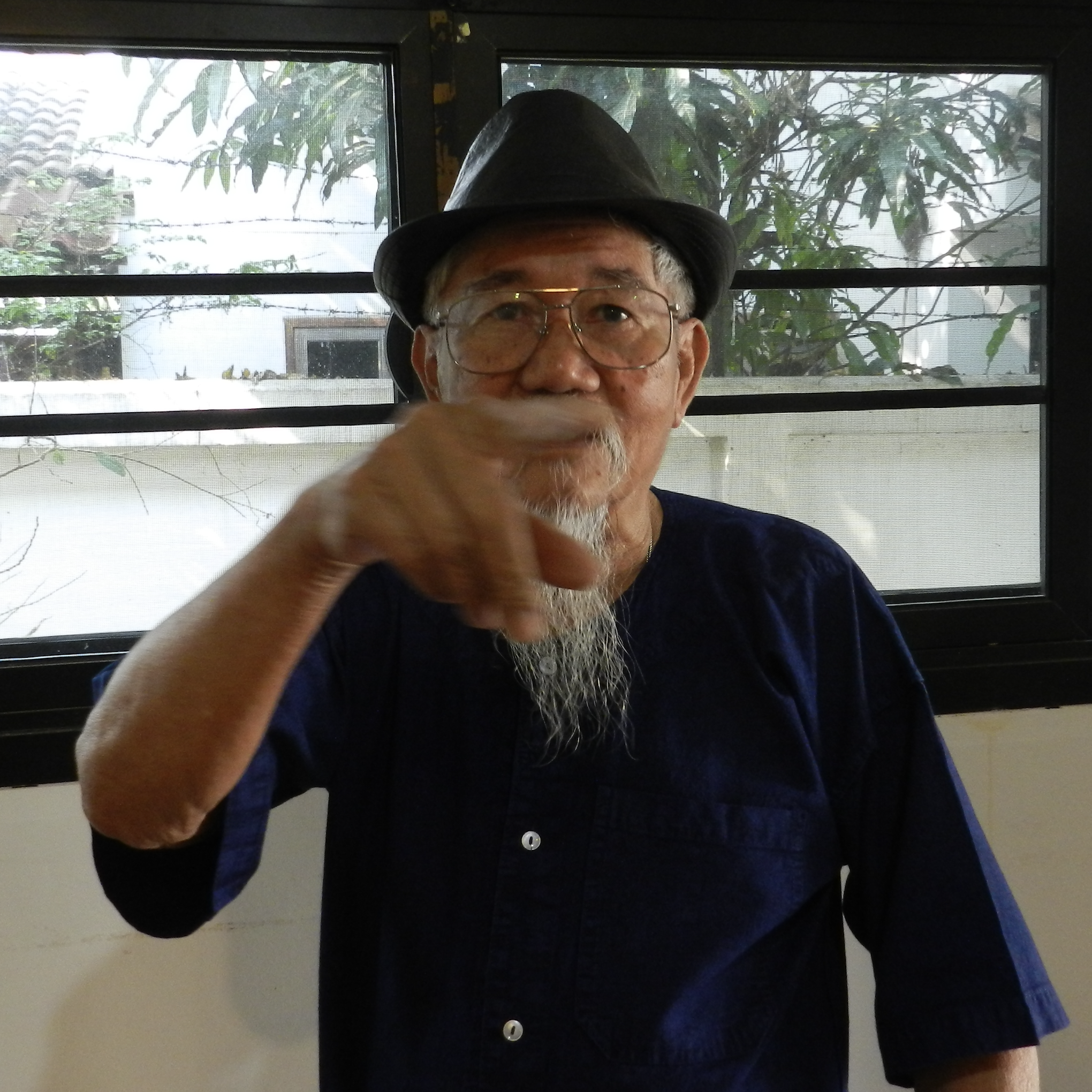
Professor Tawee Rujaneekorn discussing his art work 2017

Tawee entered a High School level art program at the Pohchang Academy Of Arts. He also became the personal student of Professor Tawee Nanthakwang (Thai: ทวี นันทขว้าง) who was the National Artist of Thailand in 1990. His studio, workplace, and gallery are in the city of Nakhon Ratchasima.

He was a student of Sin Phiirasii (Thai: ศิลป์ พีระศรี) and at Silpakorn University, was in its first graduating class, and taught at Ratchamongkol University in Nakhon Ratchasima (Thai: มหาวิทยาลัยเทคโนโลยีราชมงคลโคราช). He received his B.F.A. diploma from Silpakorn University from the hand of His Majesty the King Bhumibol of Thailand in 1964. Most of his works are two-dimensional paintings, but he also does multimedia, ceramic sculpture, and watercolor. His work may be seen at his personal museum in Nakorn Ratchasima, where he lives.

Tawee was instrumental in the commercial and artistic development of Dan Kwian Pottery Village (Thai: ด่านเกวียน) outside of the town where he lives. Several of his students went on to open businesses in Dan Kwian. He brought his students there to work.

Nearly all of the work of Tawee is political in subject matter. Some is protest art specifically targeting controversial projects such as dams. Political figures and corruption are other frequent themes of his. A museum of his work can be found in the Hua Thale Sub-district of Nakorn Ratchasima city.
