= Op Chaiyawasu =

Thai National Artist (1901–1997)

- อบ ไชยวสุ
- Born: August 15, 1901; Samre, Thonburi, Thailand
- Died: October 2, 1997 (aged 96); Bangkok, Thailand
- Resting place: Wat Makut Kasattriyaram Ratchaworawihan
- Occupations: Teacher; Writer
- Spouse: Saijai Nakhapin
- Writing career
- Language: Thai

Op Chaiyawasu (Thai: อบ ไชยวสุ, RTGS: Ob Chaiyawasue, pronounced [ˈɒp t͡ʃˌe͡ɪjɐwˈɑːsuːː]; August 15, 1901 – October 2, 1997) known by his pen name as Humorist (ฮิวเมอริสต์, RTGS: Hiumoerist), and L.Kor.Hor. (L.ก.ฮ., RTGS: Aeo Kor Hor; a mockery word of Alcohol) was a Thai writer and teacher. He is awarded as the National Artist in 1986.

== Life and career ==
Op Chaiyawasu was born on August 15, 1901, in Samre, Thonburi. He is one of the eight children of Luang Rattanatepeepalarak and his wife, Thiang Chaiyawasu. His father used to be a mentor of Vajirunhis, Crown Prince of Siam.

Chiyawasu graduated at Wat Chana Songkhram School, Wat Rajabopit School and Debsirin School. He got a job as a Thai teacher and then start switching jobs and later became a writer, he was one of the writers that formed a philosopher group called Suphapburut with Kulap Saipradit, Chote Praepan and Malai Chuphinit.

In 1986, he got awarded as the National Artist.

Chiyawasu passed away on October 2, 1997, at the age of 96. His funeral was held in Wat Makut Kasattriyaram Ratchaworawihan.
