= Pratuang Emjaroen =

Thai artist (1935–2022)

Pratuang Emjaroen (Thai: ประเทือง เอมเจริญ, October 9, 1935 – March 7, 2022) was a Thai artist.

== Biography ==
Born in 1935, Pratuang started his career as a self-taught artist in the 1970s. In the beginning, he worked as a painter for billboards and movie posters of cinema industry.

In 1971, he founded Dhamma Group.

== Works ==
- The Universe

== Recognition ==
- National Exhibition of Arts Award
- National Artist (2005)
