= Payom Sinawat =

Thai textile artist

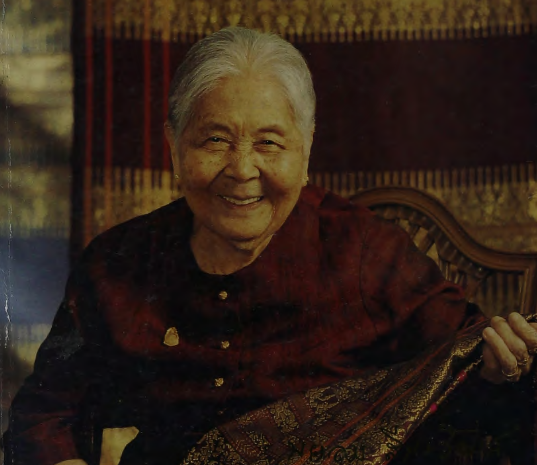
Payom Sinawat

Payom Sinawat (Thai: พยอม สีนะวัฒน์, 3 February 1909 – 25 October 2008) was a Thai textile artist. She was known as an expert in the traditional textile arts of Isan (Northeastern Thailand), and was named National Artist in visual arts in 1987.

== Life and career ==
She was born in Sisaket Province, Thailand, on 3 February 1909. In addition to handcrafting silk for the Queen, Sinawat played a vital role in popularizing traditional textile arts. She was trained by her mother at Nakhon Ratchasima Province. She learnt merging silk threads, bleaching, dyeing, and weaving. After marriage, she moved to Roi Et Province where she studied cloth work with her husband's family.

She died on at Ramathibodi Hospital on 25 October 2008.

== Awards ==
- 1979 2nd Prize, Ministry of Industry and Thai Silk Promotion Board
- 1979 1st Prize, Ministry of Industry and Thai Silk Promotion Board
- 1981 2nd Prize, Ministry of Agriculture and Cooperatives
- 1981 Winner of the Yok Silk Contest
- 1987 National Artist Award visual arts (Fine Arts), Office of the National Culture Commission
