= Thongmak Chantalue =

Mor Lam singer (1929–2011)

Thongmak Chantalue TCh, CCT
- ทองมาก จันทะลือ
- Born: February 6, 1929; Ban Chi Tha Muang, Chonnabot Subdistrict, Chonnabot District, Khon Kaen Province, Thailand
- Died: March 17, 2011 (aged 82); Det Udom District, Ubon Ratchathani Province, Thailand
- Other name: Mor Lam Thuta
- Occupations: Mor Lam singer Politician
- Years active: 1948–2011

Thongmak Chantalue (Thai: ทองมาก จันทะลือ, RTGS: Thongmak Jantalue, pronounced [θˈɒŋmak t͡ʃˈantɐlˌuː]; February 6, 1929 – March 17, 2011) was a Thai mor lam singer and a National Artist of Thailand in 1986.

== Life and career ==
Thongmak Chantalue was born on February 6, 1929, at Ban Chi Tha Muang, Chonnabot Subdistrict, Chonnabot District, Khon Kaen Province, Thailand. He is one of the nine children of Son Chantalue and his wife, Sombun Chantalue. He finished grade four at Ban Chi Tha Muang School.

Chantalue started his career at the age of 14, when his father signed him up to a Mor Lam class with Arjan On at Wat Pradu Noi. He studied with Arjan On for two years before studying with other Mor Lam teachers.

In 1986, Chantalue was awarded as the National Artist of Thailand in 1986.

== Personal life ==
Chantalue signed up for MP of Ubon Ratchathani Province and won in 1969.

== Death ==
Chantalue died on March 17, 2011, by old age at Det Udom District, Ubon Ratchathani Province at the age of 82. He donated his body to Srinagarind Hospital at Khon Kaen University.
