= Prayong Chuenyen =

Thai musician

Prayong Chuenyen (ประยงค์ ชื่นเย็น) (born 12 February 1946) is a Thai musician. He was named a national artist in 2009.
