= Khamsing Srinawk =

Thai writer

- คำสิงห์ ศรีนอก
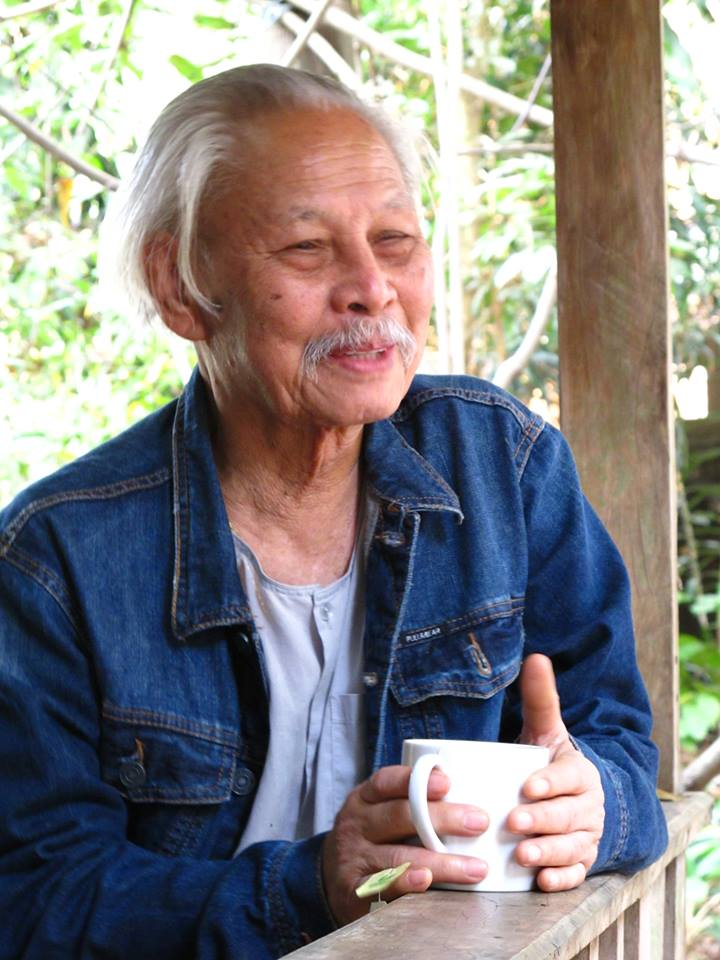
- Khamsing Srinawk at his home in Rai Than Kasem, Pak Chong, Nakhon Ratchasima
- Born: 25 December 1930 (age 95); Bua Yai District, Nakhon Ratchasima, Thailand
- Occupation: Writer
- Writing career
- Pen name: Lao Khamhom (ลาว คำหอม)
- Notable works: Fa Bo Kan (1958); Kamphaeng (1975); Maeo (1983)
- Notable awards: National Artist in Literature (1992)

Khamsing Srinawk (Thai: คำสิงห์ ศรีนอก, RTGS: Khamsing Sinok, pronounced [kʰām.sǐŋ sǐː.nɔ̂ːk]) is a writer from the Isan region of Thailand. He writes under the pen name Lao Khamhom (ลาว คำหอม, pronounced [lāːw kʰām.hɔ̌ːm]). He was named a National Artist in Literature in 1992 and is best known for his satirical short stories published in his 1958 collection Fa Bo Kan (ฟ้าบ่กั้น, pronounced [fáː bɔ̀ː kân]) ['The Sky is No Barrier']. Benedict Anderson argues that Khamsing is the best known short story writer in Thailand.

== Early life ==
Born 25 December 1930 in Bua Yai District of Thailand's northeastern Nakhon Ratchasima Province, Khamsing was raised on a farm in the countryside. Khamsing read heavily during his childhood and was encouraged in his studies by his uncle, a Buddhist monk, and other members of his family.

He was the sixth of seven children by his parents Suay and Kham Srinawk. After completing schooling in the local Bua Yai government school, he traveled to Bangkok and simultaneously enrolled in the faculty of journalism at Chulalongkorn University and the faculty of economics at Thammasat University. Unable to afford room and board, Khamsing lived in a Buddhist temple in Bangkok while attending night classes and working part time as a journalist until he was overcome with illness and forced to drop out of school. As a journalist, he served as a political reporter and feature writer. He saw journalism as a way to improve society. The first paper he worked for was Naew Na. Newspapers were Khamsing's entry to the literary world of Bangkok and he would use these connections to begin publishing his work. His personal farm in Pak Chong District, Nakhon Ratchasima, became a refuge in times of crisis or government suppression of intellectuals, especially in the late-1950s and on his return from exile in the early-1980s. The farm produced corn, cotton, and milk using "modern" methods. It also may have added a mystique to Khamsing's persona as one who could shift between rural and urban contexts seamlessly. More importantly, his farm in later years became a place for young writers to come to learn the craft. From Bangkok, Khamsing took a job with the state forestry service, working in the far north as a forest ranger for three years (1953–1956). Herbert Phillips, who knew Khamsing, said that it was a time when the author "thrived – psychologically, physically, and as a reader and writer." On his return to Bangkok, he worked for a Cornell anthropology research project with Phillips and others. He took odd jobs as a traveling sewing machine salesman. He even briefly opened his own publishing house named Kwian Thong ('Golden Oxcart').

== Publication of Fa Bo Kan ==
A year after his stint in the forestry service, Khamsing began publishing short stories in the newspaper Piyamit (ปิยะมิตร) ['Dear Friend']. Other publications where his work appeared include: Chiwit, Sangkhommasat Parithat, Khwan Chai and Chatturat. (Note: More extensive publication history can be found in the 1979 Thai edition of his Fa Bo Kan.) This corresponded with the relatively free press Thailand enjoyed during the years 1955–1958. Due to the political power-struggle between CIA-backed Phao Sriyanond and Pentagon-supported Sarit Thanarat, Thai writers and intellectuals were free to express their ideas. This atmosphere of free press quickly evaporated after the 16 September 1957 coup that drove Phao and Plaek Pibulsonggram into exile. Anderson argues that Khamsing's Fa Bo Kan, a collection of many of his stories originally published in Piyamit, best symbolizes this period of intellectual freedom. Shortly after the publication of Fa Bo Kan, Sarit seized power and established an absolute regime. Sarit's regime reinstated strict censorship, ending the period of free thought through imprisonment, exile, and execution of Thai intellectuals, writers, and progressives. This crackdown on progressives and the independent press forced Khamsing to abandon writing for a number of years, during which time he returned to Nakhon Ratchasima to his farm.

== Travels abroad and return ==
In 1967–1968 Khamsing was awarded a Time-Life grant to visit the US. He spent the year working with the publishing house. On his way back to Thailand he visited France, Germany, Israel, and the Ivory Coast, apparently as an official guest studying literary and agricultural activities. He was able to lecture at several universities on his work and contemporary Thai literature. After his return to Thailand, Suchat Sawatsi invited him to contribute regularly to Sangkhommasat Parithat (สังคมศาสตร์ปริทัศน์) ['Social Science Review']. These articles, many of which were concerned with social injustice in rural Thailand, were compiled in a 1975 publication known as Kamphaeng (กำแพง, pronounced [kām.pʰɛ̄ːŋ]) ['Walls']. Suchat, along with Sulak Sivaraksa rediscovered the work of Khamsing after a visit to his farm, which led to the republication of Fa Bo Kan and his writing was disseminated in magazines of university literary clubs.

In 1970 Khamsing was married to Prawee. They would subsequently have three daughters together.

== Political action and exile ==
Khamsing continued writing and working on his farm in Nakhon Ratchasima until the beginning of the 1973 student democracy movement. After the military and police crackdown on student demonstrations at Thammasat University on 14 October 1973, Khamsing became politically active and was elected vice-chairman of the Socialist Party of Thailand. It is said that on two occasions in the early-1970s, Khamsing sold off many of his milking cows to finance unsuccessful campaigns for election to Thai parliament. In 1975 a Committee for the Revision of Textbooks in the Ministry of Education sought to revise the school curriculum to emphasize the role of average people in society. As a result, on 17 May a new reading list for Mathayom Suksa 4 and 5 was published in Sayam Rat which made the work of Khamsing, along with fifteen others, part of the mandatory reading.

After the Thammasat University massacre of 6 October 1976, Khamsing fled with many others to the jungle, eventually making his way to Laos. His work was banned by the incoming government. Several months later, in 1977 he went into exile with his family to Sweden after a disagreement with the Communist Party of Thailand. In Sweden he was made a member of the Swedish Association of Writers and was able to promote his work in Europe. While in exile, he went on a lecture tour in the US. He also began again working on his first novel Maeo (แมว, pronounced [mɛ̄ːw]) ['Cat'], which is a metaphor for Thailand itself. Khamsing first began working on Maeo after the events of 14 October 1973, but he manuscript was lost in the turmoil of 1976. Eventually, the novel was published in 1983 after Khamsing returned to Bangkok in 1981.

== Influence on Thai literature ==
Even though he is not a prolific author, Khamsing is credited with starting a shift in Thai literary style and focus. While the majority of Thai literature before the 20th century was dominated by royal and elite authors writing for the kingdom's gentry, Khamsing's divergence from typical Thai literary subject matter created the concept of the Thai peasant as hero. By giving voice to the common peasant, often in the vernacular in the village setting, Khamsing's writings, most notably Fa Bo Kan, worked to democratize Thai literature. In his works, Khamsing has depicted the plight of the Thai peasant, and in so doing, seek social justice and the betterment of Thai society in general. His writing is seen as a preeminent example of the "life as art" movement advocated by Jit Phumisak. His work has been listed as among the best in a century of the Thai short story. In 1992 the National Cultural Commission, with royal support, awarded him the title "National Artist of Thailand in Literature," including a stipend for life. His work is now featured in the national school curriculum. His work has been translated into nine languages, including English, Swedish, Danish, Dutch, Japanese, Singhalese, Malay, German, and French. His English translators have included Michael Smythes, Herbert Phillips, and Domnern Garden.

In May 2011, Khamsing added his name to what has come to be called the "Thai Writers' Manifesto", a petition signed by 359 Thai writers and academics calling for drastic revisions to Thailand's lèse majesté laws (Article 112 of current Thai Criminal Code), under which numerous Thai and others have been jailed.
