= Saeng-da Bunsiddhi =

Thai textile artist

Saeng-da Bunsiddhi (Note: RTGS: Saengda Bansit. Also spelled Saengda and Sangda (sometimes misspelled as Sanda); and Bansiddhi, Bannasit and Bunsidth.) (Thai: แสงดา บันสิทธิ์; 14 April 1919 – 11 January 1993) was a Thai textile artist. Born in Chom Thong District, Chiang Mai, she learned the traditional craft of weaving during her childhood. After her husband died in 1960, Saeng-da started a weaving group by local women to produce and promote hand-made fabrics. She was named a National Artist in Visual Arts (Weaving) in 1986. Her legacy is continued by the weaving group of Ban Rai Phai Ngam in Chom Thong and the Pa-Da Cotton Textile Museum located there.
