= Chavalit Soemprungsuk =

Thai painter (1939–2020)

Chavalit Soemprungsuk (Thai: ชวลิต เสริมปรุงสุข, 30 July 1939 – 27 April 2020) was a Thai painter, sculptor, and printmaker based in Thailand and the Netherlands. In 2014, Soemprungsuk was honored as a National Artist of Thailand for visual arts.

== Biography ==
Soemprungsuk was born in Khon Kaen, Thailand, located in the country's northeast Isan region, on 30 July 1939. He studied at Silpakorn University in Bangkok, where he was one of the last students of the Italian-born sculptor, Silpa Bhirasri. Soemprungsuk then moved to Amsterdam to enroll at the Rijksakademie van beeldende kunsten (State Academy of Fine Arts).

Soemprungsuk worked in several different visual arts throughout his career, including realistic and abstract paintings and sculpture. He focused on digital printing during the last ten years of his life. Most recently, Soemprungsuk returned to Bangkok in the spring of 2020 for a public exhibition as part of the 80+ Art Festival Thailand.

Soemprungsuk had several pre-existing conditions, including heart disease and lymphoma, before he began exhibiting symptoms of COVID-19 on 10 April 2020. He was hospitalized at the Onze Lieve Vrouwe Gasthuis (OLVG) hospital in Amsterdam on 17 April 2020. Chavalit Soemprungsuk died from COVID-19 during the COVID-19 pandemic in the Netherlands at OLVG on 27 April 2020, at the age of 80.
