= Nongchanai Prinyathawat =

Thai novelist

Nongchanai Prinyathawat (Thai: นงไฉน ปริญญาธวัช; 1921–2014) was a Thai novelist.

She was born on 9 May 1921 in Chaiyaphum. She earned a bachelor's degree in law from Thammasat University. She was a professor in the Faculty of Arts at Chulalongkorn University.

Nongchanai wrote around 50 novels, over 10 children's novels, as well as short stories and poems. Many of her novels were made into television series and films. She often used the pen name Kanchana Nakhanan (Thai: กาญจนา นาคนันทน์).

Her first long novel was Sam Darun, published in 1946. Her 1965 romance novel of Thai rural life, Poo Yai Lee Gub Nang Ma, is one of the most famous novels in Thailand. The novel was made into a film and television dramas seven times between 1971 and 2009.

Nongchanai was recognized as a National Artist of Thailand in 2012 in the category of literature.

She died on 30 May 2014 at her home in Chanthaburi.

== Selected works ==
- Poo Yai Lee Gub Nang Ma (Headman Lee and Miss Ma)
- Toranee Ni Nee Krai Krong (Who Rules This Land?)
