= Chin Faithes =

Thai Luk thung singer

Chin Faithes ชิน ฝ้ายเทศ 1999 National Artist of Thailand
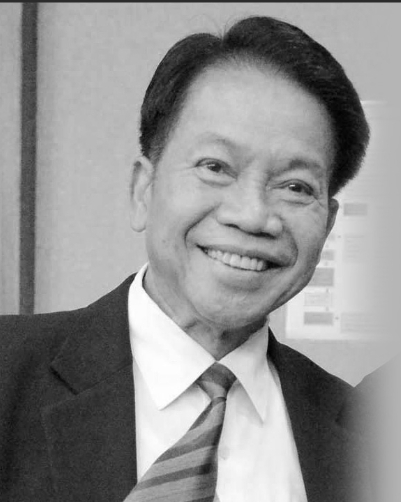

Background information
- Born: 1 April 1946; Sukhothai Province, Thailand
- Died: 18 May 2017 (aged 71)
- Genre: Luk Thung
- Occupation: Singer-songwriter
- Years active: 1950s–present
- Label: Nititad Promotion

Chin Faithes (Thai: ชิน ฝ้ายเทศ b. 1 April 1946), known professionally as Chinakorn Krailat (Thai: ชินกร ไกรลาศ), was a Thai Luk thung singer, and was named National Artist of Thailand in 1999.

== Early life ==
He was born in Sukhothai Province.

== Career ==
Beginning as a singer from "Cheer Ramwong band", he started performing on stage during the 1950s. His first album was "Luk thung Ram Luek" followed by many popular songs including "Phet Luang Nai Salam" (Thai: เพชรร่วงในสลัม), "Phet Cha Kad Jai" (Thai: เพชฌฆาตใจ), "Thee Rak Rao Rak Kan Mai Dai" (Thai: ที่รักเรารักกันไม่ได้), etc. including his most popular one "Yor Yot Pra Lor" (Thai: ยอยศพระลอ).

He was awarded National Artist of Thailand award, for performing arts (International music) in 1999.

He died from colon cancer on 18 May 2017, at age 70.
