= Vinita Diteeyont =

Thai author

- Born: March 14, 1949 (age 77); Bangkok, Thailand
- Occupation: writer
- Writing career
- Pen name: V. Vinitchaikul
- Genre: novel

Khunying Vinita Diteeyont, (Note: Khunying is an honorific title equivalent to Lady.) née Vinichayakul (born 1949), writing under the pen names V. Vinichayakul (Note: Also spelled V. Vinitchaikul, Vor Vinitchaikul, Wor Winichaikul, etc. RTGS: Wo Winitchaikun) and Kaew Kao, among others, is a Thai writer.

== Life ==
Khunying Vinita was born in Bangkok and received a BA from Chulalongkorn University and a PhD in literature curriculum and instruction from the University of Northern Colorado. She taught Thai literature and creative writing at Silpakorn University until she retired in 1995.

Vinita published her first novel Mithila Wesalee when she was a student. Her fiction includes realistic novels based on Thai life, historical novels, fantasy novels and a series of crime fiction novellas centred around a character named Khun pa Mathur (Aunt Mathur). Aunt Mathur was based on Agatha Christie's Miss Marple. Her later novels were fantasy and historical novels and these became the genres she is known for.

Vinita was named National Artist for Thailand in 2004. Nine of her novels have received the Thai National Book Award. Many of her novels have been adapted for television or film.
