= Chai Mueangsing =

Thai Luk thung singer (born 1939)

- ชาย เมืองสิงห์
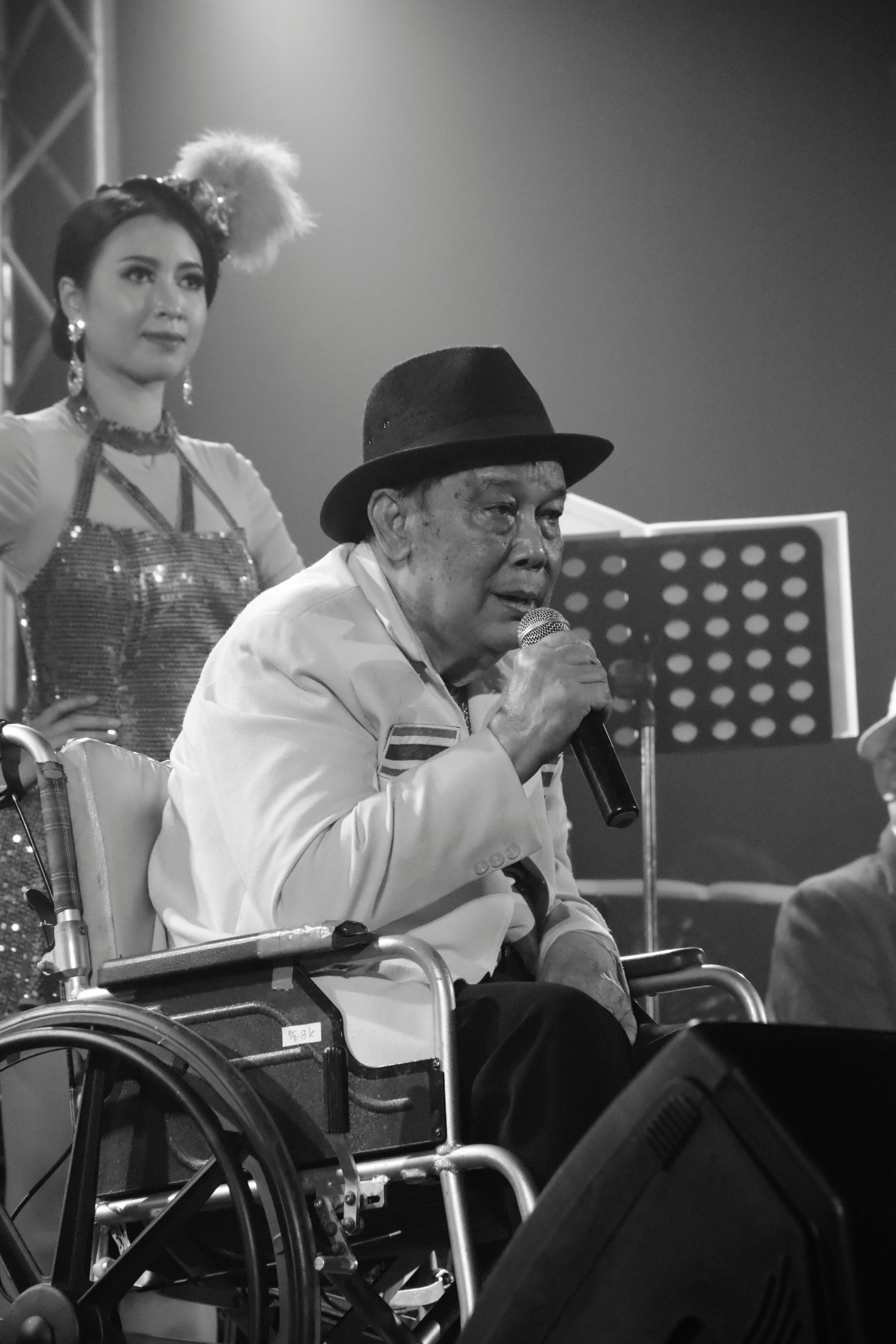
- Born: Somsien Phanthong (Thai: สมเศียร พานทอง); 24 October 1939 (age 86); Sing Buri province, Thailand
- Occupation: Singer
- Musical career
- Genres: Luk thung
- Years active: 1960s-Present

Chai Mueangsing (Thai: ชาย เมืองสิงห์ 24 October 1939–) is a famous Thai Luk thung singer, who was awarded National Artists of Thailand, performing art (International music) in 1995.

== Early life ==
He was born Somsien Phanthong in Sing Buri province. He finished in secondary 6 from Sing Buri School.

== Career ==
In 1961, he debuted on stage in Luk thung Chula Rat band. The head of Mongkol Amatayakala heard him competing with Porn Phirom and asked Chai to join his band.

He recorded many popular tunes, including "Miea Phee Mee Choo", "Sib Ha Yok Yok", "Malai Dok Rak", "Ruea Lom Nai Nong", "Mae Sue Mae Chak", "Tham Boon Ruam Chat", "Phoe Luk Oon" and "Luk Sao Krai Noe".

He interrupted his performing career in the 1970s, because of his parents death and other challenges he was facing during that time. He returned to performing in 1989.

He was awarded National Artists of Thailand, performing art (International music) in 1995.

He was called the "Alain Delon of Thailand" or "The Man City Lion".

== Discography ==
- "Miea Phee Mee Choo" (เมียพี่มีชู้)
- "Malai Dok Rak" (มาลัยดอกรัก)
- "Tam Ruad Krab" (ตำรวจครับ)
- "Tham Boon Ruam Chad" (ทำบุญร่วมชาติ)
- "Pee Pai Lai Wan" (พี่ไปหลายวัน)
- "Phoe Luk Oon" (พ่อลูกอ่อน)
- "Sib Ha Yok Yok" (สิบห้าหยกๆ)
- "Luk Sao Krai Noe" (ลูกสาวใครหนอ)
- "Mae Sue Mae Chak" (แม่สื่อแม่ชัก)
- "Ruea Lom Nai Nong" (เรือล่มในหนอง)
- "Kha Khab Prik" (กาคาบพริก)
- "Yik Kaem Yok" (หยิกแกมหยอก)

== Filmography ==
- 1995 – Mon Rak Luk Thung – role Ai Chom
- 2008 – Hanuman Kluk Fun – role himself
