= Yodrak Salakjai =

Police Corporal Yodrak Salakjai ยอดรัก สลักใจ

Background information
- Born: Niphon Plaiwan (Thai: นิพนธ์ ไพรวัลย์); February 6, 1956; Phichit, Thailand
- Died: August 9, 2008 (aged 52) Bangkok, Thailand
- Genres: Luk thung; pop; Luk krung; ballad
- Occupations: Singer; actor
- Instrument: Vocal
- Years active: 1971–2008
- Labels: Amiko; Nopporn Promotion; Nititad Promotion; RS; Diamond Studio; Salakjai Promotion

Police corporal Niphon Praiwan (Thai: สิบตำรวจโทนิพนธ์ ไพรวัลย์) or stage name Yodrak Salakjai (Thai: ยอดรัก สลักใจ) was a famous Luk thung singer and actor.

== Life ==
=== 1956–1972: early life ===
His nickname is Aew (Thai: แอ๊ว). He was born on February 6, 1956, at Ngio Rai County, Taphan Hin district, Phichit province. He was a youngest of the eight children of Boontham and Bai Praiwan. He finished educated from Thonburi teacher's college.

In his family life, he was married to Ladda Praiwan and they had one son.

=== 1972–2008: Entertainer ===
When he was young, his family financial status was very poor, his father died when Salakjai was seven. He left his family at age 11 to become a singer. He was a singer with Ked Noi Watthana Ram Wong Band, where he gained 5–10 baht.

Until he sang in various nightclubs and restaurants in Takhli district, Nakhon Sawan province (which at that time was a red-light district because it was home to a United States Air Force Base during the Vietnam War), Dedduang Dokrak a famous Thai radio DJ was in the restaurant, where he was singing. His music tone was heard by Dedduang and Dedduang invited him to start on stage, with first stage name Yodrak Lukphichit (Thai: ยอดรัก ลูกพิจิตร), and he recorded three studio albums, but was not popularised. Until in 1976, Chonlathee Tharnthong composed a song titled Jod Mai Jak Naew Naa (Thai: จดหมายจากแนวหน้า) which Yodrak sang, and became popular. He renamed his stage name from Yodrak Lukphichit to Yodrak Salakjai.

Throughout his 36 years in the showbiz he has performed 4,200 songs and has also starred in some films such as 1998's Crime Kings. One of his most popular songs Sam Sib Yang Jeaw (Thai: สามสิบยังแจ๋ว) has been re-recorded by young performers many times in various genres, not even alternative rock.

== Death ==
In 2008, he went to get health checked. The doctor found that he had liver cancer, but he did not want his cancer treated. His health began to deteriorate and he died at the age of 52 at 1:05 am, on August 9, 2008.

== Discography ==
- Jod Mai Jak Neaw Na (จดหมายจากแนวหน้า)
- Hom Tong Non Tay (ห่มธงนอนตาย)
- Khad Khon Hung Kaw (ขาดคนหุงข้าว)
- Ai Num Too Pleang (ไอ้หนุ่มตู้เพลง)
- Khad Nguen Khad Rak (ขาดเงินขาดรัก)
- Sam Sib Yang Jeaw (สามสิบยังแจ๋ว)
- Aao Nae (เอาแน่)
- Jam Jai Doo (จำใจดู)
- Long Luea Ha Rak (ล่องเรือหารัก)
- Kha Tha Ma Ha Ni Yom (คาถามหานิยม)
- Ar Ray Koe Koo (อะไรก็กู)
- Khob Khun Fan Pleang (ขอบคุณแฟนเพลง)
