= Supreme Artist Hall =

Thai museum showcasing National Artists

Coordinates: 14.072081°N 100.704617°E

The Supreme Artist Hall (Thai: หออัครศิลปิน) is a museum in Khlong Luang District, Pathum Thani Province, Thailand.

It was constructed to showcase Thailand's National Artists. The hall is named in honour of King Bhumibol Adulyadej, also referred to as the "Supreme Artist" for his contributions music and photography.
