= Janaprakal Chandruang =

- ชนประคัลภ์ จันทร์เรือง
- Born: 1 August 1954 (age 72); Bangkok, Thailand
- Other name: Kru Chang
- Education: University of Montana
- Occupations: Actor; director; producer; screenwriter; acting coach; musician
- Years active: 1981–present
- Father: Kumut Chandruang

Janaprakal Chandruang (Thai: ชนประคัลภ์ จันทร์เรือง, RTGS: Chonprakhan Chanrueang; born August 1, 1954), also familiarly known by his nickname Kru Chang (ครูช่าง, "master Chang") is a Thai actor, television drama director and producer, screenwriter and acting coach.

== Early life ==
Janaprakal was born and raised in the home of Luang Pradit Pairoh, who was recognized as "maestro of Thai classical music". There he learned performing arts and music from Luang Pradit, his grandfather.

He holds a bachelor's degree in drama from the University of Montana (UMT), USA. Between 1981 and 1994 he was an acting coach for the Faculty of Arts, Chulalongkorn University (CU). During that time, he also performed many roles in stage plays, television dramas, and movies, mostly supporting actors.

His best known role was Si Ouey from the film of the same title in 1991. The film is based on a true historical story about an overseas Chinese serial killer who killed and consumed the flesh of children in the late 1950s.

== Later life ==
Around 1994, he turned his back on the showbiz, by working only behind the scenes and is the founder of Moradok Mai (มรดกใหม่, "new heritage") a place that is both a theater and a boarding school for Thai youth to promote Thai performing arts based in Pathum Thani's Khlong Hok on the north outskirts of Bangkok.

In 2019, he was appointed a National Artist in the performing arts branch (movies-television drama).
