= Sor =

Sor or SOR may refer to:

== Arts, entertainment, and media ==
- School of Rock, 2003 film starring Jack Black
- Shades of Rhythm, a British based rave music group
- Son of Rambow, 2008 film starring Bill Milner and Will Poulter
- "Sor", Serdar Ortaç song
- Streets of Rage, a popular beat 'em up series developed by Sega

== Geography ==
- Sor, Ariège, a French commune
- Sor, Azerbaijan, a village
- Sor (geomorphology), a kind of drainless depression with a salt marsh or intermittent lake in the Kazakh language
- Sor, Senegal, an offshore island
- Sor River, a river in the Oromio region, Ethiopia
- Sor Mañón (also known as Sor River), any of a number of rivers in Galicia, Spain
- Sorsogon, Philippines, a province (ISO sub-national code SOR)

== People ==
- Sean O'Rourke, Irish broadcaster and journalist
- Fernando Sor (1778–1839), Spanish guitarist and composer
- Yira Sor (born 2000), Nigerian footballer

== Science and technology ==
- Starfire Optical Range
- Steam to oil ratio, the ratio of water used for steam and oil in oil production.
- Successive over-relaxation, a numerical method used to speed up convergence
- System of record, an information storage system

== Transport ==
- Singapore One Rail, a public transport operator in Singapore
- SOR Libchavy, Czech bus manufacturer
- Southern Ontario Railway, a shortline railway in southern Ontario

== Other uses ==
- Sör, a word for beer in Hungary
- Sex offender registry
- Equality Act (Sexual Orientation) Regulations (UK legislation)
- Smart order routing, a rule-based mechanism for selecting the destination of trading orders
- Society of Radiographers, a UK trade union
- Southern Operations Room, one of the fractions in the Syrian civil war
- Statutory Orders and Regulations (Canada)
- Singapore Swop Offer Rate (SOR)
- Science of reading, an interdisciplinary body of research that explains how humans learn to read and how reading should be taught.
