= Usni Pramoj =

Thai musician and courtier

Admiral Mom Luang Usni Pramoj PChW MPCh MWM OD
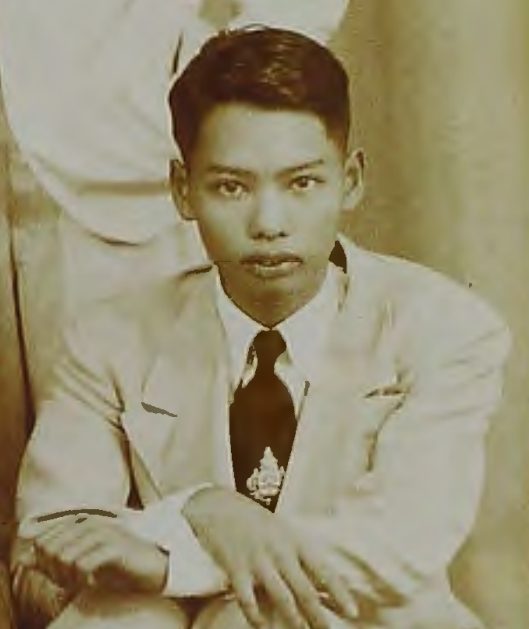

Privy Councillor of Thailand
- In office March 3, 1984 – December 6, 2016
- Monarch: Bhumibol Adulyadej

Personal details
- Born: July 1, 1934 Phra Nakhon, Siam
- Died: April 2, 2017 (aged 82) Bangkok, Thailand
- Spouse: Waraphon Pramoj
- Parent: Seni Pramoj (father) Usna Pramoj

Military service
- Branch/service: Royal Thai Navy
- Rank: Admiral

Admiral Mom Luang Usni Pramoj (Thai: อัศนี ปราโมช RTGS: Atsani Pramot; 1 July 1934 – 2 April 2017) was a Thai musician and courtier.

== Education ==
Usni was the son of Mom Rajawongse Seni Pramoj, twice Prime Minister and one of the major political figures of 20th-century Thai history, and Khunying Usana Pramoj Na Ayutthaya. In his youth he attended Bangkok Christian College before studying law at the University of Oxford. He then studied for the Bar at the Gray's Inn, qualifying as a barrister.

== Government career ==
A lawyer by profession, Usni began his career as a judge advocate in the Ministry of Defence. In 1968 he was appointed as Manager of H.M. the King's Private Property Office (part of the Crown Property Bureau). He served as Privy Councillor to two Thai kings for over three decades, from 1984 to 2016. He was an honorary Admiral of the Royal Thai Navy.

== Musical career ==
Usni was a distinguished a violinist and composer who founded the Bangkok Symphony Orchestra and was twice named a National Artist of Thailand. Usni was named National Artist in Performing Arts (Western Music) in 1994.

== Royal decorations ==
- 1997 – Knight Grand Cross (First Class) of The Most Illustrious Order of Chula Chom Klao
- 1987 – Knight Grand Cordon (Special Class) of the Most Exalted Order of the White Elephant
- 1986 – Knight Grand Cordon (Special Class) of The Most Noble Order of the Crown of Thailand
- 1997 – Companion (Fourth Class) of The Most Admirable Order of the Direkgunabhorn
- 1963 – Border Service Medal
- 1984 – King Rama IX Royal Cypher Medal
