= Songkhla =

Songkhla สงขลา (Thai) Singgora (Malay) سيڠݢورا (Jawi)
- City
- City of Songkhla เทศบาลนครสงขลา
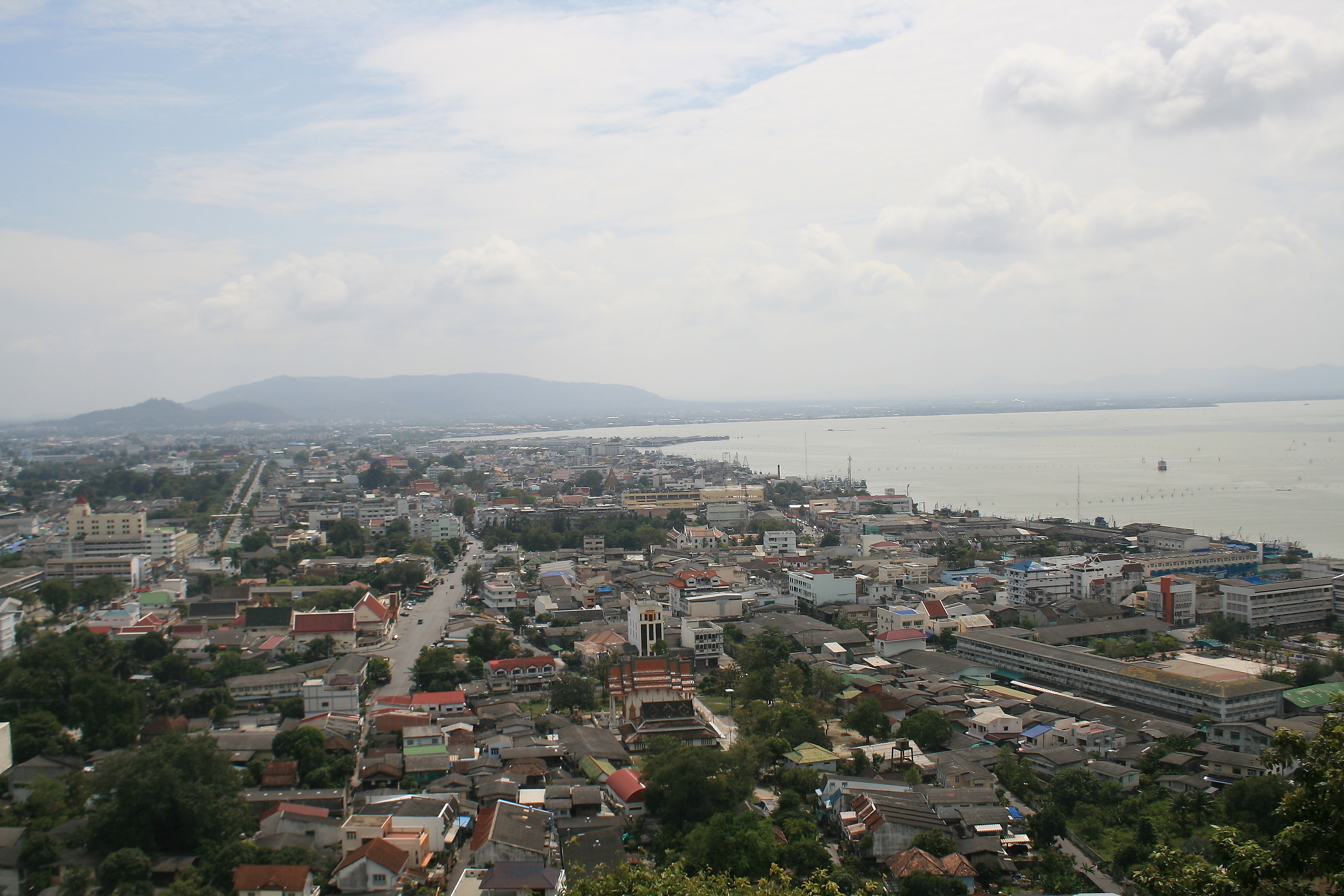

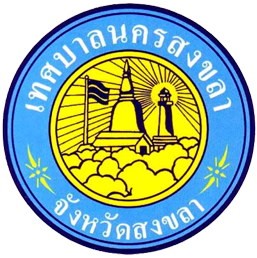
- Seal

- Location in Thailand
- Coordinates: 7°12′22″N 100°35′48″E
- Country: Thailand
- Province: Songkhla
- District: Mueang Songkhla

Government
  - Type: City Municipality
  - Mayor: Somsak Tantiseranet

Area
  - Total: 9.27 km^{2} (3.58 sq mi)
- Elevation: 11 m (36 ft)

Population (2020)
  - Total: 61,758
  - Density: 6,660/km^{2} (17,300/sq mi)
- Time zone: UTC+7 (ICT)
- Area code: (+66) 74
- Website: songkhlacity.go.th

Songkhla (Thai: สงขลา, pronounced [sǒŋ.kʰlǎː]), also known as Singgora or Singora (Pattani Malay: ซิงกอรอ, Singoro), is a city (thesaban nakhon) in Songkhla Province of southern Thailand, near the border with Malaysia. Songkhla lies 968 km (601 mi) south of Bangkok and as of 2020 had a population of 61,758.

Despite being smaller than the neighboring city Hat Yai, Songkhla is the capital of Songkhla Province as well as the Mueang Songkhla District (Songkhla town district). Together with Hat Yai, Songkhla is part of the Greater Hat Yai-Songkhla Metropolitan Area (a conurbation with a population of around 800,000), the third largest metropolitan area in Thailand.

At the opening of Songkhla Lake to the Gulf of Thailand, Songkhla is a fishing town and also an important harbour. It is the major seaport on the east side of the Isthmus of Kra.

== History ==
The name Songkhla means 'the city of lions' (not to be confused with Singapura) and is the Thai variant of "Singgora" (Malay and Jawi: سيڠڬورا). This refers to a lion-shaped mountain near the city of Songkhla. Archaeological excavations on the isthmus between Lake Songkhla and the sea reveal that in the 10th through the 14th century, this was a major urbanized area, and a center of international maritime trade, in particular with Quanzhou in China. The long Sanskrit name of the state that existed there has been lost; its short Sanskrit name was Singhapura ('Lion City') (not to be confused with Singapura), a city state. The short vernacular name was Satingpra, coming from the Mon-Khmer sting/steng/stang (meaning 'river') and the Sanskrit pura ('city').

The ruins of the ancient port city of Satingpra are just few kilometers north of Songkhla. It was one of the most important trading centers of the Tambralinga Kingdom. Archaeological digs and investigations conducted toward the end of the 20th century testify the existence of a fortified citadel protected by a moat and a quadrangular surrounding wall made of brick. A sophisticated system of canals connected the sea to the Songkhla Lake permitting the circulations of ships. The excavations brought to light artifacts of great historical and artistic value.

The precursor of the present-day town of Songkhla was The Sultanate of Singora, a heavily fortified port city. It was founded in the early 17th century by a Persian, Dato Mogol, and flourished during the reign of his son, Sultan Sulaiman Shah. In 1680, after decades of conflict, the city was destroyed and abandoned; remains include forts, city walls, a Dutch cemetery and the tomb of Sultan Sulaiman Shah.

On 8 December 1941 local time, the Imperial Japanese army landed in Songkhla, invading Thailand. Because of the International Date Line, this actually occurred hours before the 7 December (Hawaii time) attack on Pearl Harbor, making it the first major action of the Pacific War. The Japanese forces then moved south towards Perlis and Penang as part of the Malayan campaign which culminated in the capture of Singapore.

Since 2003, Songhkla has been affected by separatist insurgencies in neighboring Narathiwat, Pattani, and Yala.

The municipality's mayor, Peera Tantiserane, was murdered in Songkhla in 2014.

== Climate ==
Songkhla has a tropical monsoon climate (Köppen climate classification Am). Temperatures are very warm to hot throughout the year with only minor variation. There is a short dry season in February and March; the rest of the year is wet, with especially heavy rainfall from October to December.

Climate data for Songkhla (1991–2020, extremes 1951-present)
Month	Jan	Feb	Mar	Apr	May	Jun	Jul	Aug	Sep	Oct	Nov	Dec	Year
Record high °C (°F)	32.4 (90.3)	34.3 (93.7)	36.5 (97.7)	38.2 (100.8)	38.6 (101.5)	37.6 (99.7)	36.6 (97.9)	37.3 (99.1)	35.6 (96.1)	38.5 (101.3)	34.0 (93.2)	32.6 (90.7)	38.6 (101.5)
Mean daily maximum °C (°F)	29.0 (84.2)	30.5 (86.9)	31.5 (88.7)	32.6 (90.7)	33.4 (92.1)	33.4 (92.1)	33.3 (91.9)	33.3 (91.9)	32.7 (90.9)	31.6 (88.9)	30.0 (86.0)	29.5 (85.1)	31.7 (89.1)
Daily mean °C (°F)	27.2 (81.0)	27.5 (81.5)	28.1 (82.6)	28.9 (84.0)	29.0 (84.2)	28.7 (83.7)	28.5 (83.3)	28.3 (82.9)	28.0 (82.4)	27.4 (81.3)	27.0 (80.6)	26.9 (80.4)	28.0 (82.3)
Mean daily minimum °C (°F)	24.9 (76.8)	25.0 (77.0)	25.2 (77.4)	25.8 (78.4)	25.8 (78.4)	25.5 (77.9)	25.2 (77.4)	25.1 (77.2)	24.9 (76.8)	24.6 (76.3)	24.6 (76.3)	24.6 (76.3)	25.1 (77.2)
Record low °C (°F)	19.1 (66.4)	19.3 (66.7)	19.7 (67.5)	21.1 (70.0)	22.1 (71.8)	21.1 (70.0)	21.1 (70.0)	21.9 (71.4)	21.4 (70.5)	21.1 (70.0)	19.9 (67.8)	20.5 (68.9)	19.1 (66.4)
Average precipitation mm (inches)	127.2 (5.01)	54.9 (2.16)	71.3 (2.81)	85.8 (3.38)	114.8 (4.52)	102.7 (4.04)	95.1 (3.74)	137.8 (5.43)	123.3 (4.85)	279.8 (11.02)	587.9 (23.15)	468.3 (18.44)	2,248.9 (88.54)
Average precipitation days (≥ 1.0 mm)	7.5	4.5	5.3	6.3	9.8	8.9	9.2	10.5	11.4	16.2	20.3	17.7	127.6
Average relative humidity (%)	77.4	76.2	77.3	77.1	77.0	76.3	75.8	75.7	77.7	81.4	84.3	81.9	78.2
Mean monthly sunshine hours	179.8	183.6	204.6	201.0	151.9	150.0	151.9	151.9	144.0	111.6	105.0	142.6	1,877.9
Mean daily sunshine hours	5.8	6.5	6.6	6.7	4.9	5.0	4.9	4.9	4.8	3.6	3.5	4.6	5.2
Source 1: World Meteorological Organization
Source 2: Office of Water Management and Hydrology, Royal Irrigation Department (sun 1981–2010)(extremes)

== Population ==
The majority of the population is Buddhist with a large proportion of Muslims, especially in the rural areas near the Malaysian border. These Muslims speak the Yawi language, a language closely related to Malay, which has some Thai influence, especially in loan words borrowed from the Thai language.

Songkhla city takes up the entire Bo Yang sub-district. As of 2020 Songkhla city had a population of 61,758.

== Gallery ==
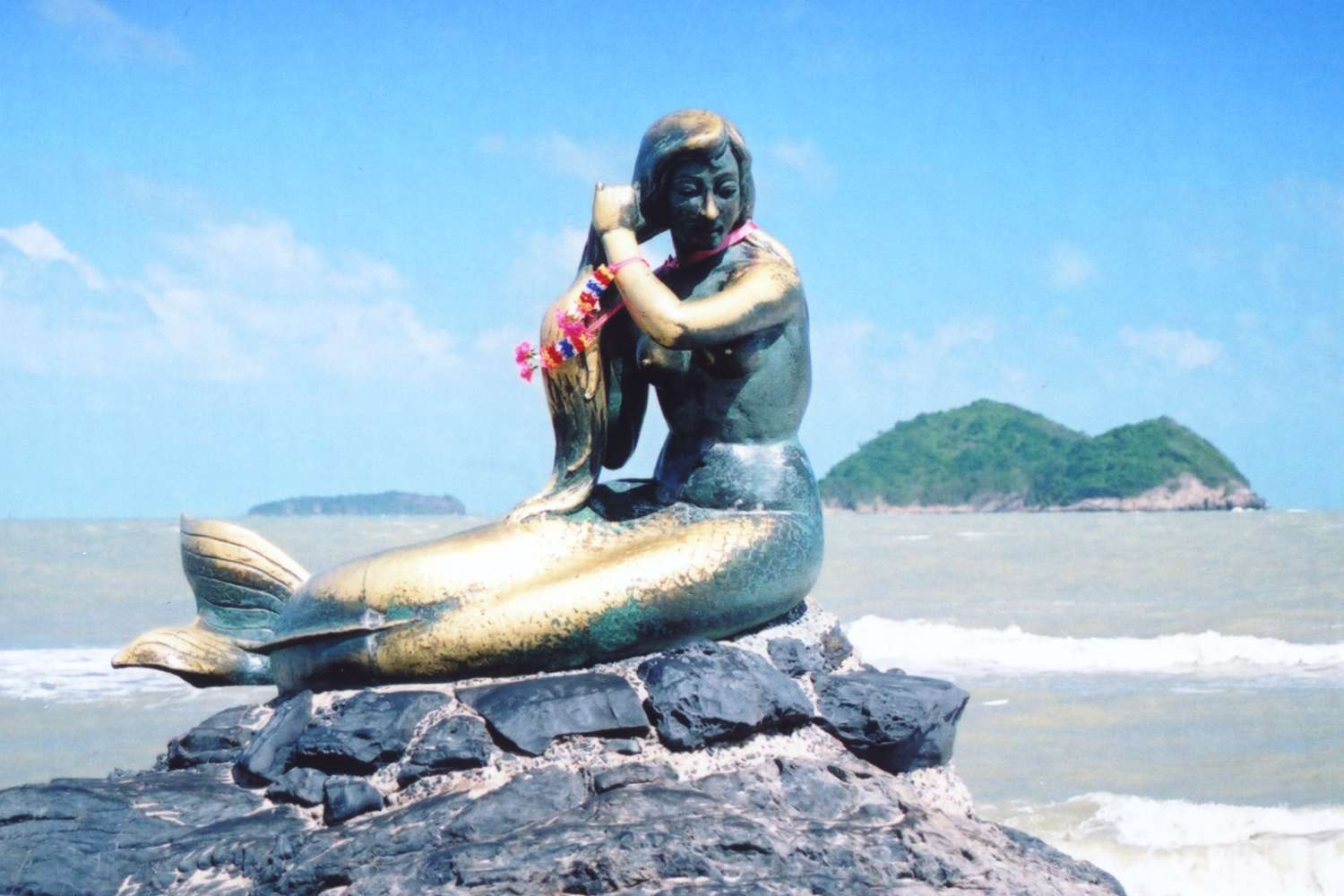
Mermaid statue, Laem Samila beach

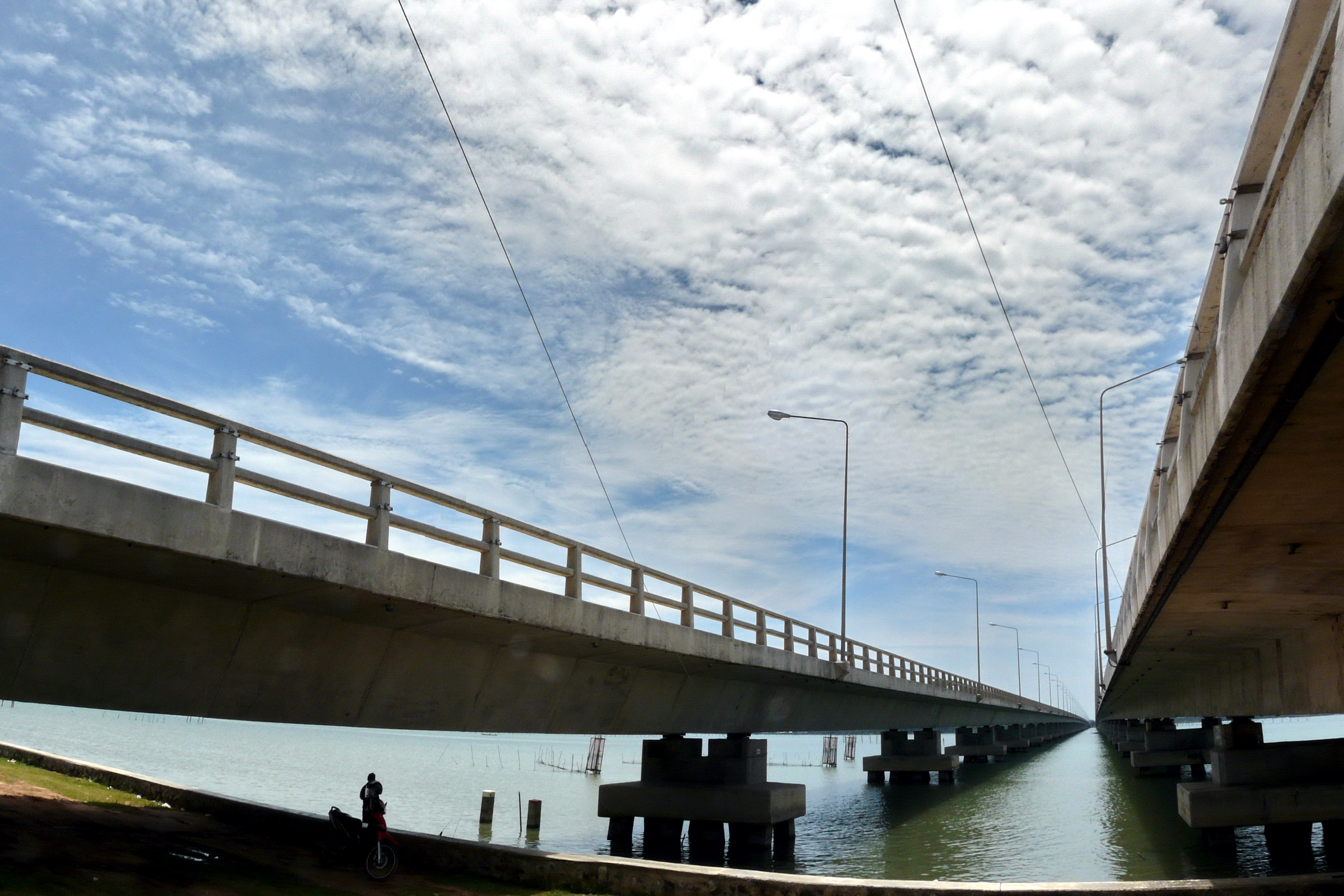
Tinsulanonda Bridge

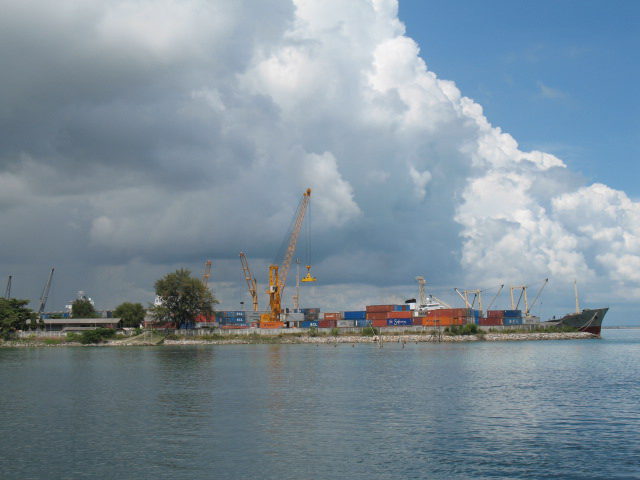
Seaport

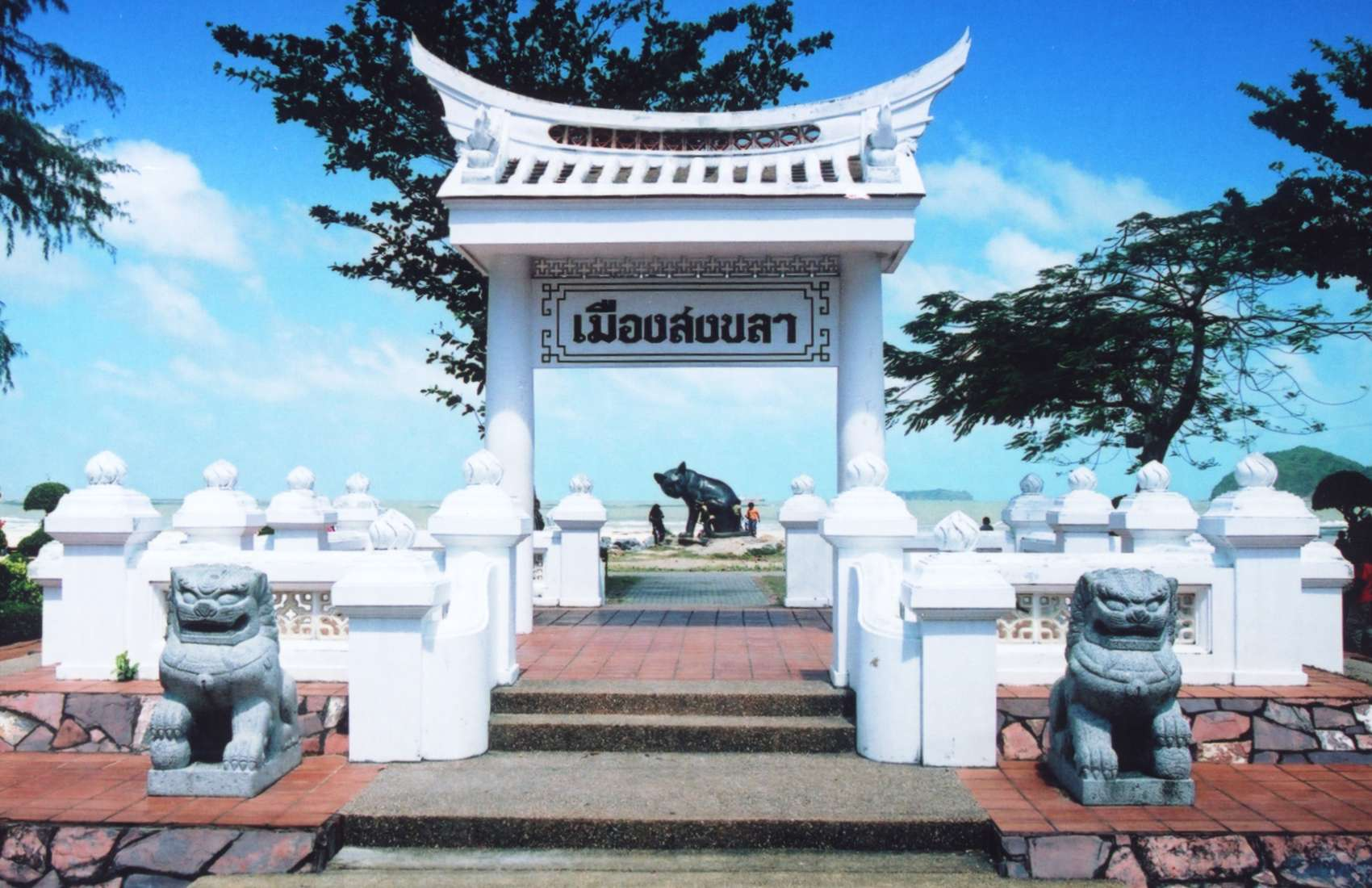
Laem Samila beach

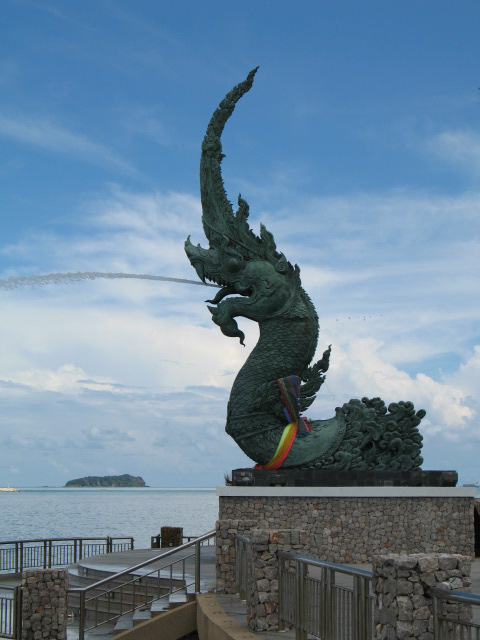
Naga Head at Song Thale Park

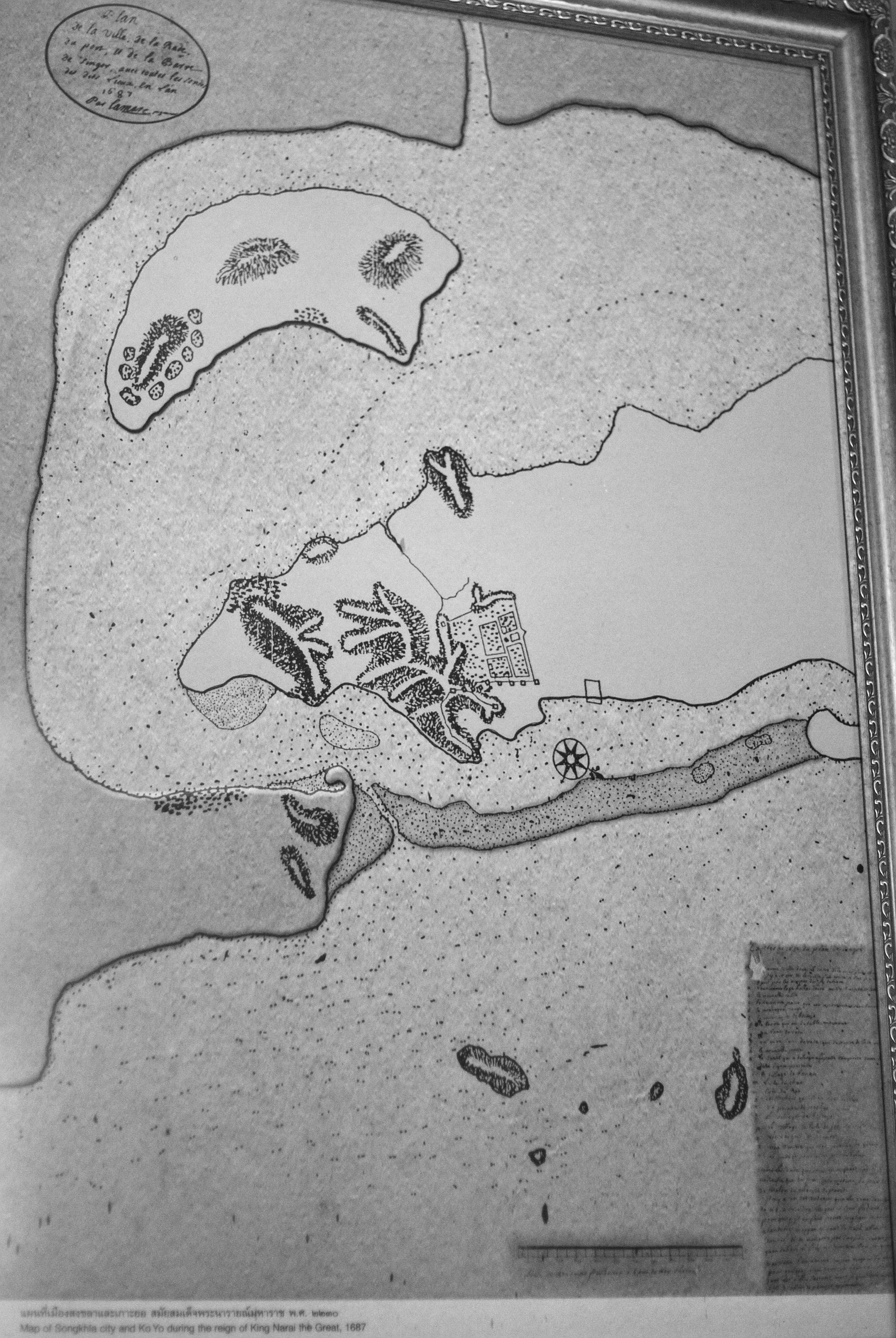
French hydrographic/topographic map of Songkhla, during the reign of King Narai the Great, 1687

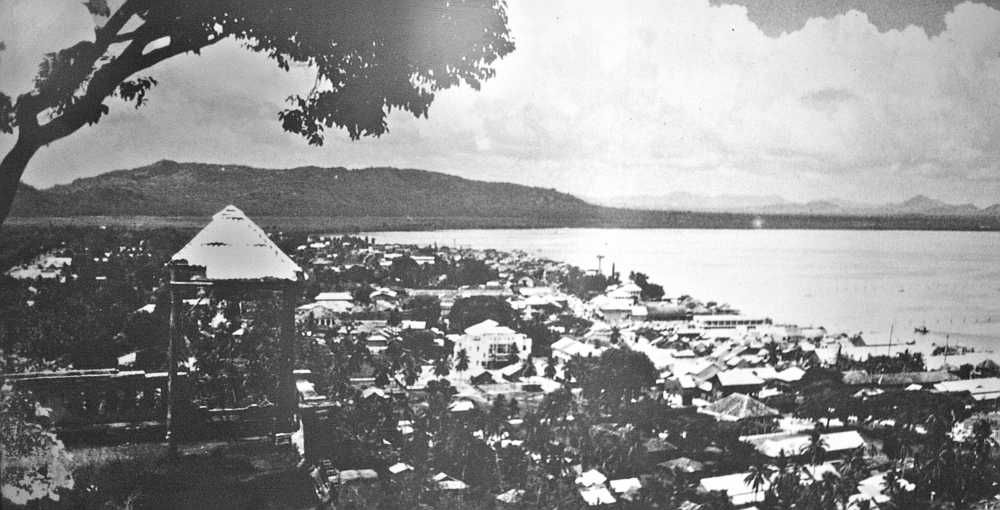
Songkhla looking west from Khao Tangkuan, c. 1930

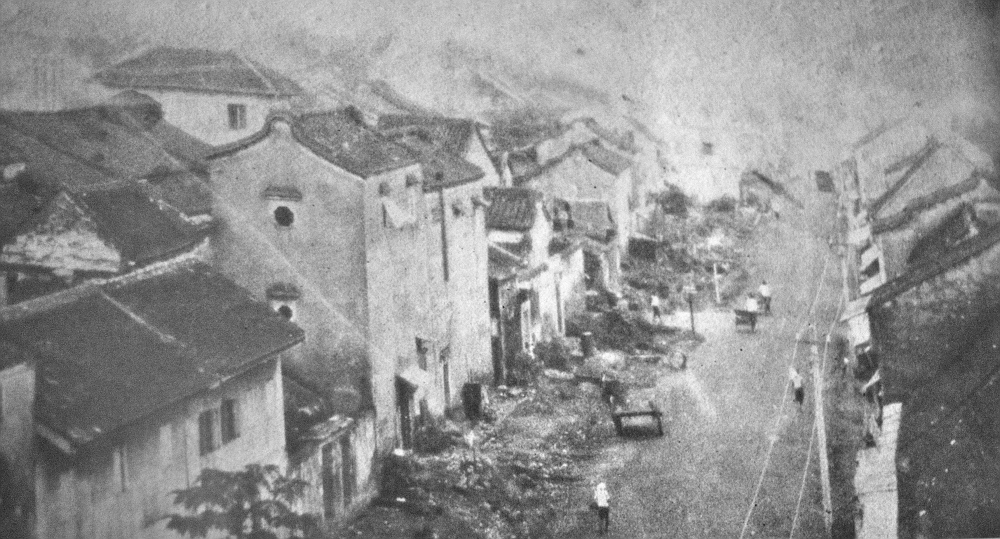
Nakhon Nok Rd., c. 1932

== See also ==
- Sultanate of Singgora
- Mahavajiravudh Songkhla School
