= Mathar Bunnag =

Thai architect

Mathar Bunnag (Thai: เมธา บุนนาค, born 28 October 1950) is a Thai architect who works in Thailand and around the globe under his design studio, Bunnag Architects.

His resort creations have received extensive international recognition and awards.

In 2012 he was designated a National Artist of Thailand in the field of Architecture. In 2011 he received the a+d Spectrum Foundation of India's Golden Award for Excellence in Architecture.

In 2014 he represented Thailand in the 14th International Architecture Exhibition at La Biennale di Venezia as Curator and Designer for the Thailand Pavilion, titled "Spirituality — freedom and creativity, a fundamental in Thai Architecture".

== Education ==
He earned a Bachelor of Architecture degree from Silpakorn University, Thailand, where he was personally awarded by His Majesty King Bhumibol as a commendation of excellence in architecture.

At the University of Manitoba, Canada, he studied architecture ideology under Professor Eric Lye Kum-Chew and gained a Master's of Architecture in 1974.

In 1984 he graduated with a Master's of Architecture in Urban Design from the Harvard Graduate School of Design, USA, earning a distinction for his graduate thesis, under Professor Edward Sekler, “Conservation on Cultural Heritage, Historic Monuments, Urban Space and Meaning in the Historic Core of Thailand”.

In 2012 he was conferred an Honorary Doctorate Degree by Silpakorn University, Thailand.

== Academic works ==
1984-1986 Senior Lecturer in Architecture at the National University of Singapore

1986-1988 Honorary Lecturer at the University of Hong Kong

== Notable Resort Works ==
- Four Seasons Resort, Chiang Mai, Thailand
- The Barai, Hua Hin, Thailand
- Phulay Bay, a Ritz-Carlton Reserve, Krabi, Thailand
- The Oberoi, Mauritius
- Sofitel SO Mauritius
- Maia Luxury Resort & Spa, Mahe, Seychelles
- Conrad Maldives Rangali Island
- Pangkor Laut Resort, Lumut, Malaysia
- Four Seasons Resort, Langkawi, Malaysia
- Trident Gurgaon, India
- The Roseate, Dusit Devarana New Delhi, India
- Cape Weligama, Sri Lanka
