= Prayoon Yomyiam =

Prayoon Yomyiam (Thai: ประยูร ยมเยี่ยม, RTGS: Prayun Yomyiam, 30 August 1933 – 20 November 2010) was a Thai folk singer, best known for her expertise in the traditional genre of lamtat, for which she headed the performing troupe Lamtad Mae Prayoon. She was named National Artist in performing arts (Thai performing arts) in 1994.

In 2018 on her birthday, she was honored with a Google Doodle.
