= Pinyo Suwankiri =

Thai architect

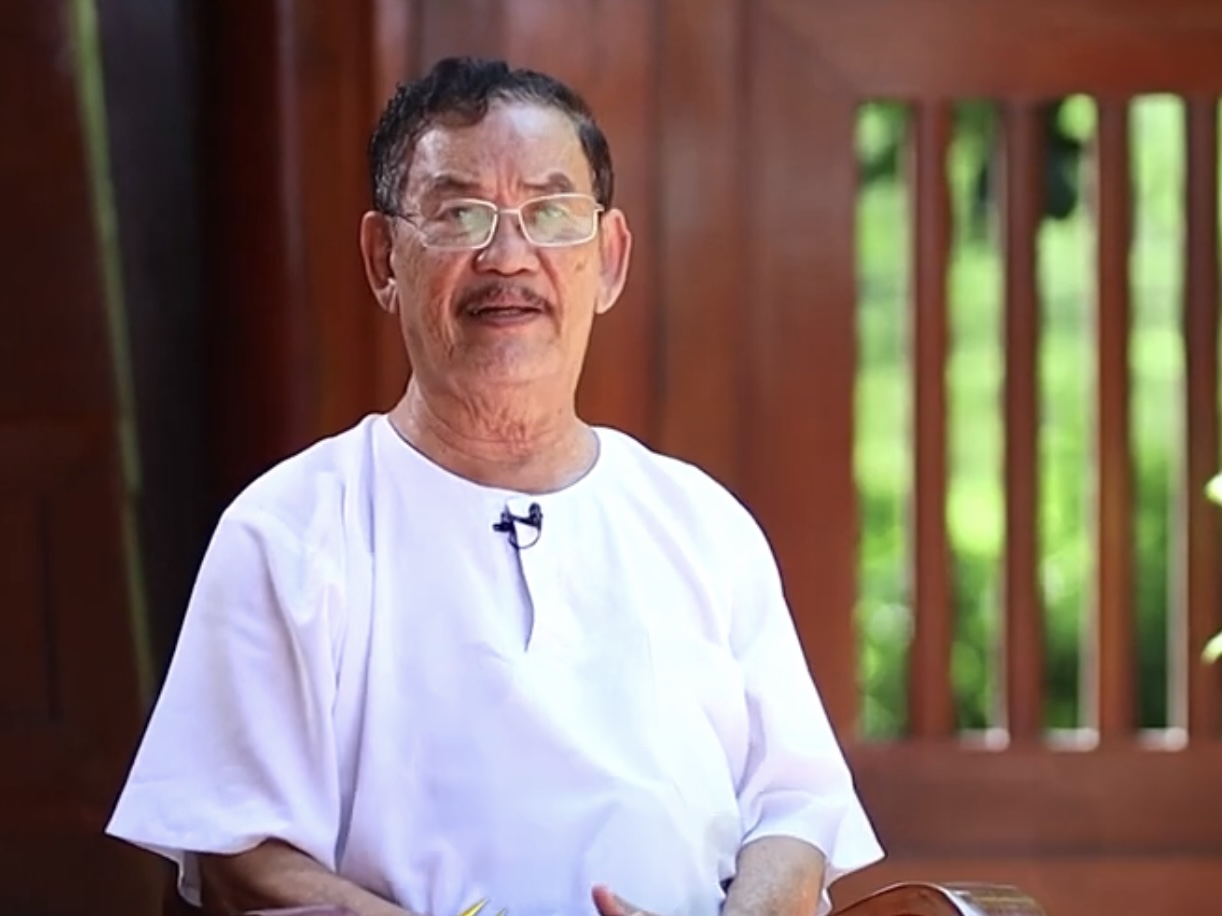
Suwankiri in 2020

Pinyo Suwankiri (Thai: ภิญโญ สุวรรณคีรี, RTGS: Phinyo Suwankhiri; born 10 March 1937) is a Thai architect. He was born in Songkhla.

Suwankiri began painting and carving as a child, and created decorations for various festive occasions. His carvings were used to decorate local temples, monks' residences and schools. Suwankiri received his primary school education in his home province. When it was time for high school he was tutored by a senior at a temple in Bangkok in order to prepare him for the university entrance exam. As a result of his efforts he was accepted into the Faculty of Architecture at Chulalongkorn University. He graduated from Chulalongkorn University in 1964.

After his graduation he applied for a teaching position at his faculty in order to teach Thai Architecture.

In 1972 Suwankiri began studying toward a master's degree at the School of Architecture at University of Pennsylvania. Nine months later he successfully finished his studies and returned to teach again at his home university as the specialist for Thai Architecture.

== Awards and honors ==
Suwankiri's Awards and Honors include but are not limited to:

- 1988 Honor Doctorate in Fine Arts, Srinakharinwirot University
- 1993 Honor Doctorate in Architecture, King Mongkut's Institute of Technology Ladkrabang
- 1993 National Artist of Thailand for Visual art and Applied art
- 2000 Nikkei Asia Prize for Culture

== Work ==
As a traditional Thai Architect Suwankiri designs buildings with modern purposes such as government buildings. He furthermore designed schools, pavilions and temples. His work has international recognition; one of his Sala Pavilions was dedicated by Their Majesties King Bhumibol Adulyadej and Queen Sirikit of Thailand to the East–West Center in Hawaii. Given The building was dedicated to expand cultural understanding and is still part of the University of Hawaii campus life. Another one of his international works is the Baan Thai Pavilion in Echo Valley, British Columbia. This design was one of the first traditional Thai structures designed to withstand the colder temperate climate zone where very snowy winters are common. Tierpark Hagenbeck's Sala Thai in Hamburg, Germany is a Thai pavilion built by Suwankiri. It was claimed to be the biggest of its kind in Europe.

== See also ==
- Wiki article about Pinyo Suwankiri in Thai
