= Seri Wangnaitham =

Thai choreographer and dancer

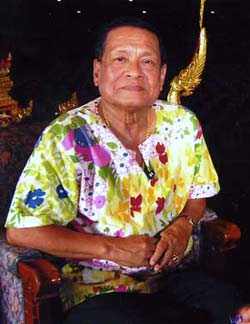
Seri Wangnaitham

Seri Wangnaitham (Thai: เสรี หวังในธรรม; January 3, 1937 – February 1, 2007, Bangkok, Thailand) was a Thai choreographer and performer of Thai traditional dance. Seri was considered a master khon dancer, which is regarded as Thailand's highest performing art form. He was also an actor, playwright, director, songwriter, poet, and television producer. He was named a National Artist in 1988.

== Biography ==
=== Early life and career ===
Seri was born in Bangkok, Thailand the son of Leu and Sa-nga Wangnaitham. He was educated in the Thailand Fine Arts Department's College of Dramatic Arts, and in 1954 joined the department as a musical artist. He eventually became head of the music division. He received a scholarship to study fine arts at the University of Hawaii from 1962 to 1965.

In 1988, he was named a National Artist for performing arts.

Among Seri's works was the television variety show, Srisuk Nattakham, which ran for 13 years. He also produced the educational program, Singkhuanroo Kon Doo Khon (Things You Need to Know Before Viewing Khon) in 1972, which served as an introduction to khon for a new generation of Thais.

He was a regular performer at important cultural events, including a khon performance by 2,526 dancers in Sanam Luang to celebrate the 200th anniversary of the Rattanakosin Kingdom.

=== Later works ===
Among his later works was an adaptation of Thailand's national epic, the Ramayana, Ramayana Epic: the Incarnation of Rama, with 150 performers at the National Theater in 2005.

In his later years, Seri suffered from heart disease, asthma, and emphysema, prompting occasional hospital stays. He died at Mission Hospital after being admitted a day earlier while suffering from exhaustion following a trip to Rama II Park in Amphawa, Samut Songkhram Province.

Royal-sponsored funeral rites were held at Wat Tritossathep presided over by Princess Maha Chakri Sirindhorn.
