= Penpan Sittitrai =

Fruit carving artist

- เพ็ญพรรณ สิทธิไตรย์
- Born: January 28, 1926; Sakon Nakhon Province
- Died: August 3, 2015 (aged 89)
- Known for: Thai fruit carving

Penpan Sittitrai (Thai: เพ็ญพรรณ สิทธิไตรย์; January 28, 1926 – August 3, 2015) was Thailand's most famous fruit carving artist and an author. In 2010 she received the honorary title of National Artist for her work. She wrote a book titled The Art of Thai Vegetable and Fruit Carving.

In February 2017 Google has run a Google Doodle in her honor.
