= Montri Tramote =

Thai musician

Montri Tramote (Thai: มนตรี ตราโมท, RTGS: Montri Tramot, pronounced [mōn.trīː trāː.môːt]; 17 June 1900 – 6 August 1995) was a Thai musician, known as a master of Thai classical music. He was a professional musician under the employment of Fine Arts Department throughout his work life, composing over 200 musical pieces and developing traditional Thai music education into formal theory and curricula. He was named a National Artist in Thai music in 1985.
