= Falami =

Subdistrict in Phatthalung Province

Falami ตำบลฝาละมี
- Subdistrict
- Motto: สู่คุณภาพชีวิตที่ดีกว่า สานงานการศึกษา มุ่งพัฒนาโครงสร้างพื้นฐานส่งเสริมกีฬา และภูมิปัญญาท้องถิ่น
- Interactive map of Falami
- Country: Thailand
- Province: Phatthalung
- District: Pak Phayun

Government
  - Type: Subdistrict Administrative Organization (SAO)
  - Head of SAO: Kanpai Phonpong

Population (2026)
  - Total: 4,870
- Time zone: UTC+7 (ICT)

Falami (Thai: ตำบลฝาละมี, pronounced [falˈɑːmi]) is a tambon (subdistrict) of Pak Phayun District, in Phatthalung province, Thailand. In 2026, it had a population of 9,525 people.

== History ==
The name Falami is from บ้านควนฝาละมี. The settlement was located in present-day Ban Falami. The area, originally known as Ban Khuan, was named because it consisted of a hill full of trees with many wild animals. At that time, small amount of locals lived there.

About two kilometers east of Ban Khuan was บ้านบนสวน, where some Chinese families had migrated from China. They were known for their wealth, and local residents commonly referred to Ban Bon Suan as บ้านจีน (Chinese Village).

One day, The bandits raided Ban Chin. While fleeing, the bandits passed through Ban Khuan and dropped a pot lid. In southern Thai, a pot lid is called ฝามี The object was later found by villagers while clearing the forest.

== Administration ==
=== Central administration ===
The tambon is divided into eleven administrative villages (mubans).

| No. | Name | Thai | Population |
|---|---|---|---|
| 1. | Falami | ฝาละมี | 1,186 |
| 2. | Khuan Phra | ควนพระ | 1,341 |
| 3. | Bang Muang | บางมวง | 1,394 |
| 4. | Phra Koet | พระเกิด | 1,100 |
| 5. | Khuan Nang Phim | ควนนางพิมพ์ | 444 |
| 6. | Bang Khuan | บางขวน | 1,209 |
| 7. | Pak Krieao | ปากเครียว | 502 |
| 8. | Laem Kai Phu | แหลมไก่ผู้ | 953 |
| 9. | Khuan Khiem | ควนเคี่ยม | 739 |
| 10. | Chum Saeng | ชุมแสง | 284 |
| 11. | Peng Art | เพ็งอาจ | 373 |
