= Chalerm Buathang =

Thai National Artist (1910–1987)

- เฉลิม บัวทั่ง
- Born: August 29, 1910; Bang Yai District, Nonthaburi Province, Thailand
- Died: June 11, 1987 (aged 76)
- Occupation: Musician
- Years active: 1925–1987
- Spouse: Sawai Buathang

Chalerm Buathang (Thai: เฉลิม บัวทั่ง, RTGS: Chalerm Booathung, pronounced [t͡ʃˈalɜːm bjˈuːɐθˌaŋːː]; August 29, 1910 – June 11, 1987) was a Thai musician and lyricist. He was awarded as the National Artist in 1986.

== Life and career ==
Chalerm Buathang was born on August 29, 1910, in Bang Yai District, Nonthaburi Province. He was one of the eighteen children of Pun Buathang and his wife, Thanom Buathang. His father was one of the musician that played for Benbadhanabongse. After his highness passed away, he returned home to teach his children music.

Buathang started playing Ranat with his father at the age of 6, then he learned playing Thai music with Phraya Prasanduriyasap. After his teacher passed away, he got into another class and learned with Phraya Aniruthdheva.

In 1932, during the Plaek Phibunsongkhram era, his music group got merged into Fine Arts Department. He got out of the music group and became a music teacher, which he later came back to the music group again.

In 1986, he got awarded as the National Artist.

== Personal life ==
Buathang was married to Sawai Buathang and had 11 children together, 4 of which died when they were little.

== Death ==
Buathang passed away by lung cancer on June 11, 1987, at the age of 76.
