= Mahavajiravudh Songkhla School =

Education institution in Thailand

Coordinates: 7.209914°N 100.595907°E

Mahavajiravudh Songkhla School Thai: โรงเรียนมหาวชิราวุธ

Location
- Songkhla; Thailand

Information
- Established: 1896; 129 years ago
- Founder: Chaophraya Yommarat
- Gender: Boys (1896-1995); Mixed (1995-Present)

Mahavajiravudh Songkhla School (Thai: โรงเรียนมหาวชิราวุธ) is a well known educational institution located in Songkhla, southern Thailand.

== History ==
Mahavajiravudh Songkhla School is the oldest school in Songkhla province. It was established by Chaophraya Yommarat (Pan Sukhum), the governor of Nakhon Si Thammarat, on 27 October 1896 as an all-boys school. The project was funded by donations from residents, and the school was named Maha Vajiravudh as a mark of respect towards the Crown Prince Vajiravudh. The school was converted into a co-educational school in 1995.

== Notable alumni ==
- Prem Tinsulanonda, Regent of Thailand, President of the Privy Councillor, Prime Minister
- Siddhi Savetsila, Privy Councillor, Minister of Foreign Affairs
- Sophon Ratanakorn, Supreme Court president from 1990–1991
- Anusorn Mongkolkarn, film director, National Artist
