= Chonlathee Thanthong =

Thai singer (1937–2023)

- ชลธี ธารทอง
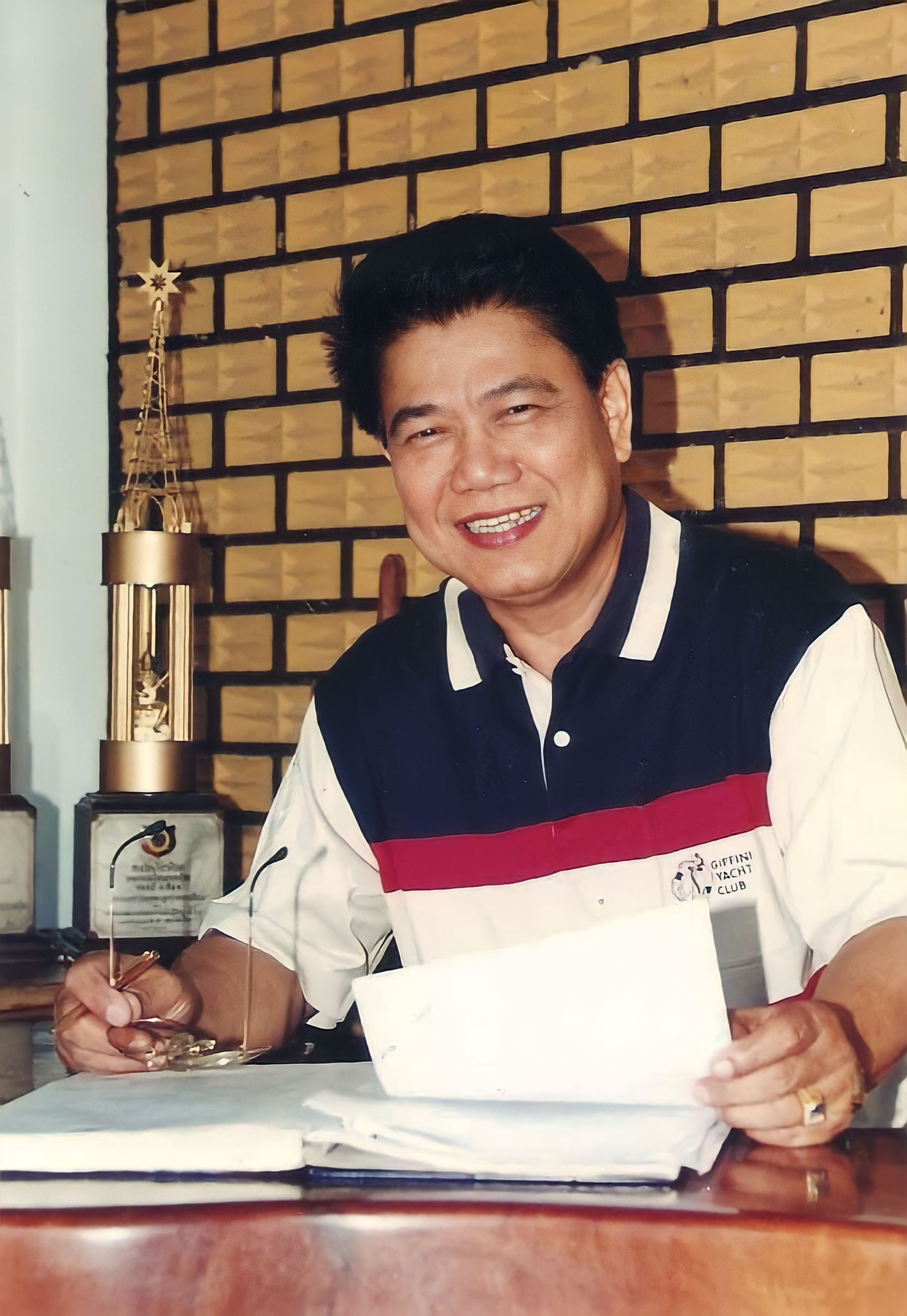
- Born: Somnuk Thongma; 31 August 1937; Chonburi Province, Thailand
- Died: 21 July 2023 (aged 85); Bangkok, Thailand
- Occupations: Luk Thung songwriter, Singer
- Spouse: Sasiwimol Thongma

Chonlathee Thanthong (Thai: ชลธี ธารทอง; born Somnuk Thongma, 31 August 1937 – 21 July 2023) was a Thai composer of luk thung and singer known by the nickname of The Angel of the (Luk thung) Songs (เทวดาเพลง), whose songs are well known and made have the many singers decorate the country music industry. He was honored by Office of the National Cultural Commission Ministry of Culture (currently the Department of Cultural Promotion Ministry of Culture) to be a 1999 National Artist Performing Arts Branch (Luk Thung Composer).

== Biography ==
Somnuk Thongma was born on 31 August 1937, in Chonburi Province. His father had an employed career who roamed around then his mother gave birth to him while rice harvesting and his mother bled to death when he was only six months old. When he was born, he didn't even have rags to make diapers. His childhood life was poor. He attended Grade 1 at Wat Kaewsilaram School, Chonburi Province and he came to grade 4 at Wat Khok Khin Nom School, Chonburi Province. He graduated from secondary school at Pracha Songkhro School, Phan Thong District, Chonburi Province. Then moved to live with relatives in Ratchaburi province he has worked in a variety of fields, including farming, digging, charcoal burning, carpenter, builder, boxer, li-ke, movie commentator, dancer and singer.

Chonlathee died on 21 July 2023, at the age of 85, after receiving treatment for a bloodstream infection at Siriraj Hospital in Bangkok.
