= Steam to oil ratio =

The steam to oil ratio is a measure of the water and energy consumption related to oil production in cyclic steam stimulation and steam assisted gravity drainage oil production. SOR is the ratio of unit of steam required to produce unit of Oil. The typical values are three to eight and two to five respectively. This means two to eight barrels of water converted into steam is used to produce one barrel of oil.
