= Srifa Mahawan =

Thai writer

Mom Luang Srifa Mahawan (Note: Mom Luang is a Thai title that means she is a descendant of a king.) (Thai: หม่อมหลวงศรีฟ้า มหาวรรณ, January 26, 1930 – April 16, 2013) was a Thai writer. She wrote under the name Srifa Ladavalaya (ศรีฟ้า ลดาวัลย์) and pen names Sifa (สีฟ้า) and Jullada Pakdeephumin (จุลลดา ภักดีภูมินทร์).

She was born Srifa Ladavalaya in Bangkok and studied business at Chulalongkorn University. She left university and taught school for eighteen years, teaching at Saint Joseph Convent Sri Racha School, Phranakorn Commercial Technological College and Bopitpimuk Commercial College. She subsequently devoted herself full-time to writing. Her first novel was Prasad Mued (The Dark Castle); it was adapted into a television series and film.

Her short story "Ai Nin" received the John A. Ekin Memorial Fund Award. Eleven of her novels have received the National Book Award. She was named National Artist for Thailand in literature in 1996.

She married businessman Boonthat Mahawan.

She died at Phramongkutklao Hospital at the age of 83 from cerebrovascular disease.

== Selected works ==
- Khao Nok Na (Rice outside the rice field), novel - translated into Japanese
- Grandmother the Progressive, short stories - translated into English
- Khamin Kab Poon (Cumin and Lime)
- Kanok Lai Botan (Kanok motif), novel

== Royal decoration ==
1997 – Companion (Fourth Class) of The Most Admirable Order of the Direkgunabhorn
