= Poh-Chang Academy of Arts =

Art school in Thailand

Coordinates: 13°44′40″N 100°29′56″E

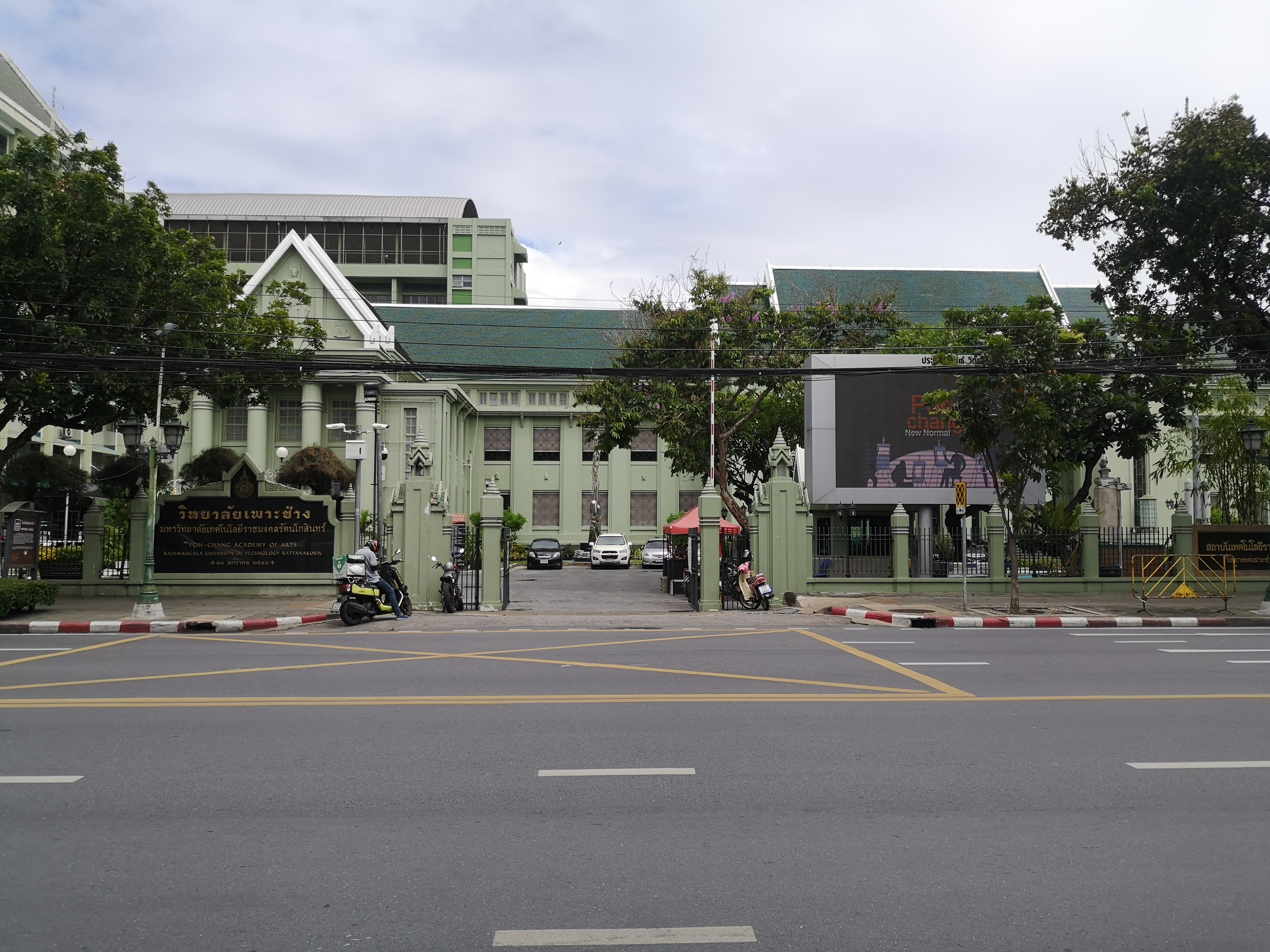
Poh-Chang Academy of Arts

The Poh-Chang Academy of Arts, Rajamangala University of Technology Rattanakosin (Thai: วิทยาลัยเพาะช่าง มหาวิทยาลัยเทคโนโลยีราชมงคลรัตนโกสินทร์) is an art school in Thailand, and the oldest such dedicated institution in the country. It was founded as the Poh-Chang School (โรงเรียนเพาะช่าง, also translated as the Arts and Crafts School) by King Vajiravudh in 1913, with the aim of establishing formal education of the traditional Thai fine arts and crafts. It has undergone numerous changes in structure throughout its history, and now operates as a constituent faculty of the university, teaching bachelor's degree courses.
