= Dominic =

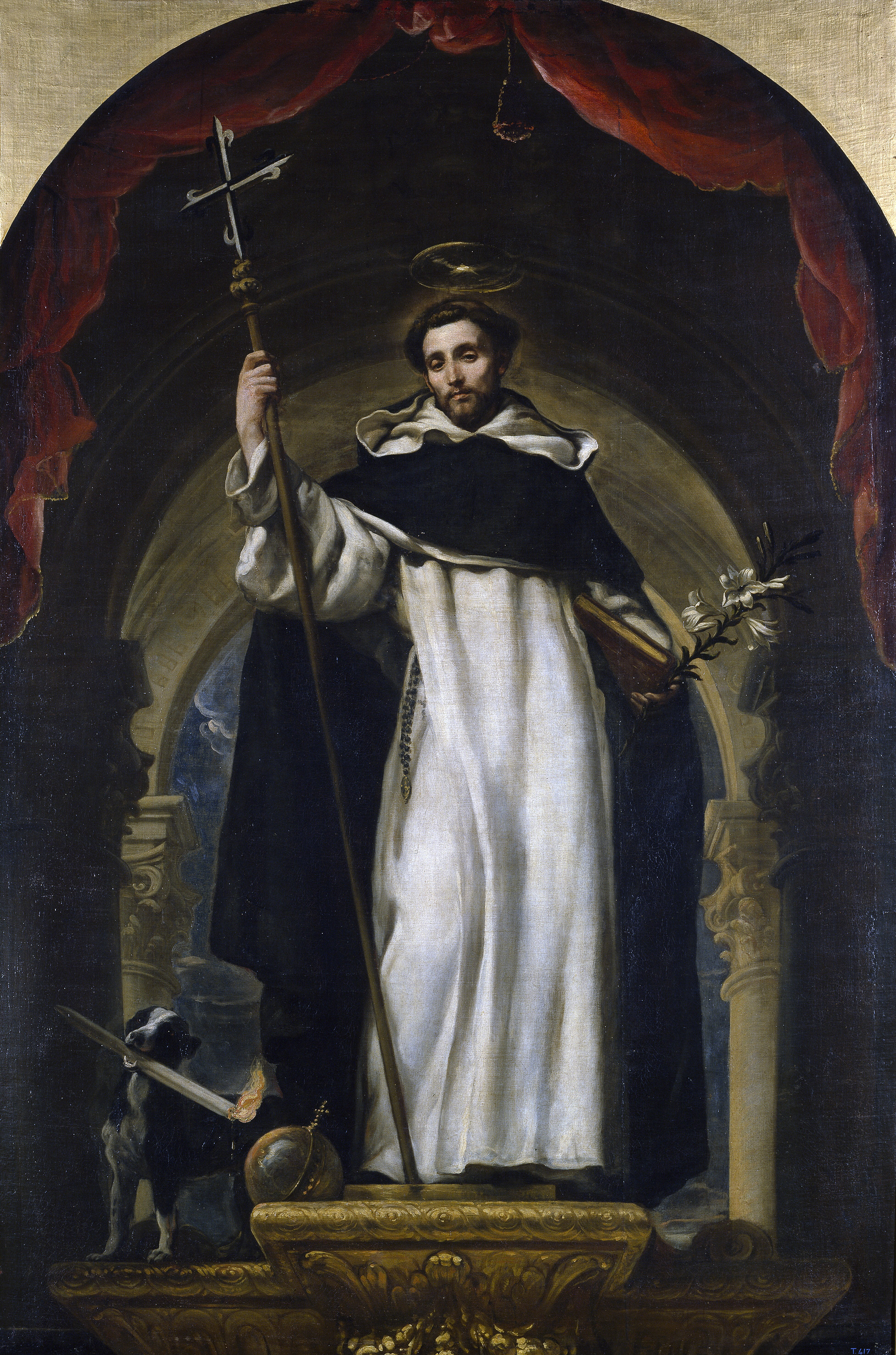
- 17th-century portrait of Saint Dominic by Claudio Coello
- Pronunciation: /ˈdɒm.ɪˌnɪk/ DOM-uh-nik
- Gender: Male

Origin
- Origin: Latin
- Meaning: "of the Lord"

Other names
- Alternative spelling: Dominik, Dominick, Domenic, Domenick
- Nicknames: Dom, Nic, Nick, Nicky
- Derived: Dominicus
- Related names: Dominicus, Domingo, Dominique, Domenico, Dominykas, Domingos, Dominika, Domenica
- A common Roman Catholic name given to a male child born on a Sunday

Dominic is a male given name common among Roman Catholics and other Latin-Romans. Originally from the late Roman-Italic name "Dominicus", its translation means "Lordly", "Belonging to God" or "of the Master".

The most prominent Roman Catholic with the name, Saint Dominic, founded the Order of Preachers, also known as Dominican friars. Saint Dominic himself was named after Saint Dominic of Silos.

Variations include Dominicus (Latin rendition), Domenic, Domenico (Italian), Domanic, Dominiq, Domonic, Domènec (Catalan), Domingo (Spanish), Dominykas (Lithuanian), Dominik (Croatian), Domingos (Portuguese), Dominggus and Damhnaic (Irish). Feminine forms include Dominica, Dominika, Domenica, Dominga, Domingas, as well as the unisex Dominique, of French origin.

Notable people named Dominic, Dominik or Dominick include:

== People ==
=== Saints ===
- Saint Dominic of Silos (1000–1073), Spanish monk
- Saint Dominic de la Calzada (1019–1109), Spanish saint
- Saint Dominic (1170–1221), founder of the Dominican Order
- Saint Dominguito del Val (died 1250), child martyr in Spain
- Saint Dominic Savio (1842–1857), Italian schoolboy
- Vietnamese Martyrs, canonized by John Paul II, 15 of whom were known as Dominic

=== Other religious figures ===
- Dominic Barberi (1792–1849), Italo-English theologian
- Dominic Collins (1566–1602), Irish Jesuit brother and martyr
- Dominik Duka (1943–2025), Czech cardinal
- Dominic Ekandem (1917–1995), Nigerian cardinal who was the first West African Catholic bishop
- Dominic Gravina (1573–1643), Italian Dominican theologian
- Dominic of Evesham, medieval prior of Evesham Abbey in England and writer of histories
- Dominic of Prussia (1382–1461), Carthusian monk
- Dominic Schram (1722–1797), German Benedictine theologian and canonist
- Dominic Tang (1908–1995), last Archbishop of Canton officially recognized by the Holy See
- Dominicus Gundissalinus, Spanish archdeacon and scholastic philosopher
- Dominik Mandić (1889–1973), Herzegovinian Croat Franciscan and historian
- Dominik Barač (1912–1945), Croatian Catholic philosopher and theologian
- Dominik Andrijašević (1572–1639), Croatian Franciscan friar and Catholic Bishop

=== Art ===
- El Greco (1541–1614), Greek painter born Doménikos Theotokópoulos
- Dominic Serres (1722–1793), French-born English painter
- Johann Dominik Bossi (1767–1853), Italian painter
- Dominic Toubeix (1924–2008), French fashion designer who worked as "Dominic" in 1960s New York
- Dominic Di Mare (born 1932), American fiber artist and sculptor

=== Business ===
- Dominic Barton (born 1962), Ugandan-born Canadian management consultant and business executive
- Dominic D'Alessandro (born 1947), Canadian business executive, President and CEO of Manulife Financial
- Dominic Grassi (1801–1880), German merchant
- Dominik Brunner (1959–2009), German businessman

=== Film and television ===
- Andrew Dominik (born 1967), Australian film-maker best known for The Assassination of Jesse James by the Coward Robert Ford
- Don Ameche (Dominic Felix Amici, 1908–1993), American actor
- Dom DeLuise (Dominick DeLuise, 1933–2009), American actor, comedian, film director, television producer, chef, and author
- Dominic Chianese (born 1931), American actor, singer, and musician best known as Corrado Soprano from The Sopranos and Johnny Ola from The Godfather Part II
- Dominic Coleman (born 1970), British actor
- Dominic Cooper (born 1978), British-born actor who has appeared in The History Boys and The Duchess
- Dominic Lam (born 1957), Hong Kong-Canadian actor and radio personality
- Dominic McLaughlin (born 2013/2014), Scottish actor
- Dominic Monaghan (born 1976), English actor best known as Charlie of Lost and Merry from the Lord of the Rings film trilogy
- Dominic Ochoa (born 1974), Filipino actor
- Dominic Purcell (born 1970), British-born Australian actor who now lives in the United States
- Dominic Rains (born 1982), Iranian-American actor
- Dominic Roco (born 1989), Filipino actor
- Dominic Roque (born 1990), Filipino actor and model
- Dominic Sena (born 1949), American film director
- Dominic Sherwood (born 1990), English actor and model best known as Christian Ozera of Vampire Academy and Jace Wayland from the Shadowhunters series
- Dominic West (born 1969), English actor who has appeared in Chicago, The Wire and 300
- Dominic Wood (born 1978), English entertainer, magician and presenter best known as one half of the double act Dick and Dom
- Dominic Zamprogna (born 1979), Canadian-born actor known for his role on the American soap opera General Hospital
- Dominik Diamond (born 1969), Scottish broadcaster, writer, radio presenter and former host of GamesMaster
- Dominik Moll (born 1962), French director and screenwriter

=== Literature ===
- Dominik Tatarka (1913–1989), Slovak writer
- Dominic Thomas (academic), British academic, UCLA professor, author of books on francophone African literature
- Dominik Smole (1929–1992), Slovenian writer and playwright

=== Media ===
- Dominic Lawson (born 1956), British journalist; brother of Nigella Lawson, son of Nigel Lawson
- Dominic Littlewood (born 1965), British TV presenter
- Dominick Dunne (1925–2009), American writer and investigative journalist

=== Military ===
- Dominic Gentile (1920–1951), World War II USAAF pilot who held World War I records of downed aircraft
- Dominic L. Pudwill Gorie, American Navy officer and astronaut
- Dominic McCarthy (1892–1975), Australian recipient of the Victoria Cross
- Dominic McGlinchey (1954–1994), Chief of Staff of the Irish National Liberation Army
- Dominic Sheldon, Anglo-Irish soldier of the seventeenth century
- Dominik Hieronim Radziwiłł (1786–1813), Polish nobleman and soldier
- Dominik von Königsegg-Rothenfels (1673–1751), Austrian imperial Fieldmarshal

=== Music ===
- Dominick Argento (1927–2019), American composer
- Dominic Behan (1928–1989), Irish songwriter
- Dominic Brown (born 1972), English guitarist and singer-songwriter
- Dominic Cifarelli (born 1979), Canadian guitarist for The Chronicles of Israfel (formerly of Pulse Ultra)
- Dominic Craik (born 1993), British guitarist for Nothing But Thieves
- Dominic Fike (born 1995), American guitarist, singer and music arranger
- D. J. Fontana (1931–2018), American drummer
- Dominic Frontiere (1931–2017), American composer, arranger, and jazz accordionist
- Dominic Harrison (born 1997), British singer known as Yungblud
- Dominic Howard (born 1977), British drummer for Muse
- Dominic Masters, lead singer of British band The Others
- Dominic Miller (born 1960), Argentinian-born English guitarist
- Dominic Salole (born 1974), Somali-Canadian musician professionally known as Mocky
- Domenico Scarlatti (1685–1757), Italian composer
- Dominic Smith (born 1973), British rapper and MC known as Dynamite MC
- Dominic Sonic (1964–2020), French singer
- Dominick Costa (1925–1983), American pop music arranger and record producer

=== Politics ===
- D. Clinton Dominick III (1918–2009), New York politician
- Dominik Drdul (born 1997), Slovak politician
- Dom Mintoff (1916–2012), prime minister of Malta
- Domenick L. Gabrielli (1912–1994), New York Court of Appeals judge
- Dominggus Mandacan (born 1959), Indonesian governor
- Dominic Cummings (born 1971), British political advisor
- Dominic Dim Deng (1950–2008), first Minister of Defence for South Sudan
- Dominic Fedee, Saint Lucian politician
- Dominic Foreman (1933–2020), Australian politician
- Dominic Grieve (born 1956), British politician and barrister
- Dominik Krause (born 1990), German politician
- Dominic LeBlanc (born 1967), Canadian politician
- Dominik Leyh (born 1989), German politician
- Dominic Perrottet, Australian politician, Premier of New South Wales
- Dominic Raab (born 1974), British conservative politician and government minister
- Dominik Mikołaj Radziwiłł (1643–1697), Polish nobleman and politician
- Dominic Romain, Trinidad and Tobago politician

=== Science and medicine ===
- Dominic A. Antonelli, American astronaut
- Dominic Bezzina, a minor Maltese philosopher who specialised in physics and logic
- Dominic Borg, a minor Maltese philosopher who specialised in rhetoric and logic
- Dominic Corrigan (1802–1880), Irish physician
- Dominic Lam (born 1947), American doctor and artist
- Dominic Landucci, American aquanaut
- Dominic Serventy (1904–1988), Australian ornithologist

=== Sports ===
- Dom DiMaggio (1917–2009), American baseball player
- Dominic Adiyiah (born 1989), Ghanaian footballer
- Dominik Alberto (born 1992), Swiss pole vaulter and decathlete
- Dominic Andres (born 1972), Swiss curler and Olympic champion
- Dominic Ball (born 1995), English footballer
- Dominic Bird (born 1991), New Zealand rugby union player
- Dominic Brewton (born 2000), American basketball player
- Dominic Calvert-Lewin (born 1997), English footballer
- Dominic Canzone (born 1997), American baseball player
- Dominik Černý (born 1997), Slovak race walker
- Dominic Chambers (born 1984), English cricketer
- Dominic Cork (born 1971), English cricketer
- Dominic Corrigan (Gaelic footballer) (born 1962)
- Dominick Cruz (born 1985), American mixed martial artist
- Dominic DeLuca (born 2002), American football player
- Dominik Eberle (born 1996), German American football player
- Dominic Frimpong (2005–2026), Ghanaian footballer
- Dominick Giudice (born 2002), American football player
- Dominik Halmoši (born 1987), Czech ice hockey player
- Dominik Hašek (born 1965), Czech ice hockey player
- Dominik Hrbatý (born 1978), Slovak tennis player
- Dominic Jones (born 1987), American football player
- Dominik Kuzmanović (born 2002), Croatian handball player
- Dominik Landertinger (born 1988), Austrian biathlete
- Dominik Livaković (born 1995), Croatian football player
- Dominic Lovett (born 2002), American football player
- Dominic Matteo (born 1974), Scottish footballer
- Dominic Moore (born 1980), Canadian ice hockey player
- Dominik Mysterio (born 1997), American professional wrestler
- Dominic Nichols (born 2006), American football player
- Dominik Paris (born 1989), Italian alpine skier
- Dominick Puni (born 2000), American football player
- Dominic Smith (baseball) (born 1995), American baseball player
- Dominic Solanke (born 1997), English footballer
- Dominic Stricker (born 2002), Swiss tennis player
- Dominik Szoboszlai (born 2000), Hungarian footballer
- Dominic Tan (born 1997), Malaysian footballer
- Dominic Thiem (born 1993), Austrian tennis player
- Dominic Thomas (born 1995), English footballer
- Dominic Thompson (footballer) (born 2000), English footballer
- Dominic Waters (born 1986), American basketball player
- Dominick Welch (born 1998), American basketball player
- Dominick Zator (born 1994), Canadian soccer player
- Dominic Zvada (born 2003), American football player

=== Other professions ===
- Dominick Bartone, American gangster and arms dealer associated with the Cleveland mafia
- Dominic Bohm, German modernist architect
- Dominic Holland (born 1969), English comedian and author
- Dominic Panganiban (born 1990), Canadian YouTuber and animator
- Dominic Sandbrook (born 1974), British historian and author
- Dominic Wong (1942–2012), official in the Hong Kong Government
- Dominic Zaca (born 1992), South African media personality, activist and actress

== Fictional characters ==
- Dominic Flandry, central character in the second half of Poul Anderson's Technic History science fiction series
- Dominic Fortune, comic book character
- Dominic Greene, primary antagonist in the James Bond film Quantum of Solace
- Dominic Reilly, on the long-running British soap opera Hollyoaks
- Dominic Santini, on the series Airwolf
- Dominic Sorel, in the 2005–2006 anime and manga series Eureka Seven
- Dominic Toretto, also known as Dom; character from The Fast and the Furious movies
- Dominick Carisi, Jr., from Law & Order: Special Victims Unit
- Dominick Cobb, from Inception
- Dominick the Donkey, the Italian Christmas donkey from a 1960 song by Lou Monte
- Dominick Hide, lead character in two episodes of the BBC's Play for Today series
- Dominick Marone, from The Bold and the Beautiful

== See also ==
- Hans Dominik (1872–1945), German science fiction writer
- Dom (given name)
- Domenic
- Domenico
- Dominic Burke (disambiguation)
- Dominika
- Dominique (name)
- Nicky
- St Dominic (disambiguation)
