= Domenica =

Domenica may refer to:

The name Domenica is a female name of Italian origin meaning she who "belongs to the Lord, to the god". In Greek it is (Kyriakí). .

== People ==
- Doménica Michelle Azuero González, Ecuadorian BMX rider
- Maria Domenica Brun Barbantini
- Domenica Hodak, American soccer player
- Maria Domenica Mantovani
- Maria Domenica Mazzarello
- Maria Domenica Michelotti
- Domenica Niehoff, German sex worker and activist
- Elena Domenica Rubeo
- Maria Domenica Scanferla (1726–1763), Italian painter
- Domenica Žuvela, Croatian singer
- Domenica Ercolani (1910–2023), Italian supercentenarian

== Communities ==
- Santa Domenica Talao, village in Calabria, Italy
- Santa Domenica Vittoria, town in Sicily, Italy

== Other ==
- Domenica (American band)
- Domenica (Greek band)
- Domenica (1952 film), a French drama film
- Domenica (2001 film), a 2001 Italian film
- Doménica Montero
- Il Blues della domenica sera
- Il giornalino della Domenica
- Il pranzo della domenica
- Il sole di domenica
- La Domenica del Corriere
- L'altra domenica
- L'Osservatore della Domenica

== See also ==
- Dominica, an island country in the Caribbean
