= Halmosi =

Halmosi is a surname. Notable people with the surname include:

- Dominik Halmoši (born 1987), Czech ice hockey player
- Péter Halmosi (born 1979), Hungarian footballer
