= Cathy Yandell =

Scholar of French literature

Cathy Yandell is a writer, professor, and scholar of French literature and culture. She is the W. I. and Hulda F. Daniell Professor Emerita of French and Francophone Studies at Carleton College, Northfield, Minnesota, United States. In 2019, she was named a Chevalier (Knight) in the Ordre des Palmes Académiques by the French government.

== Education and career ==
Yandell earned a diploma from the Institut des Professeurs de Français à l’Étranger at the Sorbonne in 1970, a Bachelor of Arts in French from the University of New Mexico in 1971 and a Ph.D. in French literature from the University of California, Berkeley in 1977.

Yandell is the W. I. and Hulda F. Daniell Professor of French Literature, Language, and Culture at Carleton College, where she teaches in the Department of French and Francophone Studies.

Yandell served as Vice President of the Sixteenth Century Society and Conference in 2010 and subsequently as president in 2011. Yandell has held roles in scholarly organizations, including serving on the executive committee of the Modern Language Association’s division on sixteenth-century French literature and culture, where she also served as Chair for two terms.

She has also served on the editorial boards of French Review, Women in French, and French Forum, and in France by her participation in the Société française des études du seizième siècle and in the honorary committees of scholarly. She also served as President of the Faculty at Carleton College. She has received fellowships from the University of California, the Mellon Foundation, the Bush Foundation, Carleton College, and the National Endowment for the Humanities.

== Research and scholarly works ==
Yandell’s scholarship focuses on early modern French literature and culture, a period marked by the convergence of Renaissance humanism, religious conflict, emerging notions of individuality, and major cultural transformation.

In Carpe corpus: Time and gender in early modern France (2000), Yandell examines the intersections of time, the body, and gender in sixteenth-century French culture.

Her other works include Memory and community in sixteenth-century France (2015), which she co-edited with David P. LaGuardia.

Her work co-edited with Colette H. Winn, Vieillir à la Renaissance (2009; reprinted 2023) examines literary and cultural representations of aging, bodily decline, and social value.

In 2023 she published The French Art of Living Well: Finding Joie de Vivre in the Everyday World (2023).

== Selected publications ==
=== Books ===
- LaGuardia, David P.; Yandell, Cathy (3 March 2016). Memory and Community in Sixteenth-Century France. Routledge. ISBN 978-1-317-09769-3.
- Winn, Colette H.; Yandell, Cathy M., eds. (2009). Vieillir à la Renaissance. Colloques, congrès et conférences sur la Renaissance européenne. Paris: Champion. ISBN 978-2-7453-1746-9.
- Yandell, Cathy (2000). Carpe Corpus: Time and Gender in Early Modern France. University of Delaware Press. ISBN 978-0-87413-704-0.
- Carpenter, Scott Dominic, ed. (1996). Vagabondages littéraires: initiation à la littérature d'expression française. New York: McGraw-Hill. ISBN 978-0-07-011444-9.
- Yandell, Cathy (2023). The French art of living well: finding joie de vivre in the everyday world (1st ed.). New York: St. Martin's Press. ISBN 978-1-250-77798-0.

=== Selected articles ===
- Yandell, Cathy (2006), "Les roses de Ronsard : humanisme et subjectivité", Nature et paysages, Paris: Publications de l’École nationale des chartes, pp. 29–38, ISBN 978-2-35723-125-2
- Yandell, Cathy (27 May 2024), "Le corps criminel dans Les pitoyables et funestes regrets de Marguerite d'Auge (1600)", Harmoniques littéraires, Presses de l’Université de Montréal, pp. 163–174, ISBN 978-2-7606-4950-7
- Yandell, Cathy (31 October 2022), "The Body in Renaissance France: Signifier, Symbol, Metaphor", The Body in Renaissance France: Signifier, Symbol, Metaphor, Routledge, doi:10.4324/9780367347093-rerw34-1
- Yandell, Cathy (31 October 2022), "The Body in Renaissance France: Signifier, Symbol, Metaphor", The Body in Renaissance France: Signifier, Symbol, Metaphor, Routledge
- Yandell, Cathy (1985). ""A La Recherche Du Corps Perdu": A Capstone of the Renaissance "Blasons an Atomiques"". Romance Notes. 26 (2): 135–142. ISSN 0035-7995.
- Yandell, Cathy (1997). "Carpe diem Revisited: Ronsard's Temporal Ploys". The Sixteenth Century Journal. 28 (4): 1281–1298. doi:10.2307/2543578. ISSN 0361-0160.
- "Cannibalism and Cognition in Jean de Léry's Histoire d'un voyage". Taylor & Francis. 3 March 2016. doi:10.4324/9781315594880-17/cannibalism-cognition-jean-de-l%C3%A9ry-histoire-un-voyage-cathy-yandell. Archived from the original on 7 May 2025.
