= Michal Horský =

Slovak political scientist and politician (1943–2018)

Member of the Chamber of the Nations
- In office 1990–1992

Personal details
- Born: 1 July 1943 Trnava, Slovak Republic
- Died: 18 March 2018 (aged 74) Trnava, Slovakia
- Party: Public Against Violence
- Education: Comenius University
- Occupation: Political scientist

Michal Horský (1 July 1943 – 18 March 2018) was a Slovak political scientist and politician. A member of the Public Against Violence, he was elected to the Chamber of the Nations, the upper chamber of the Federal Assembly of Czechoslovakia, between 1990 and 1992.

Horský was born in Trnava and studied philosophy and history at Comenius University in Bratislava. He was one of the founders of the University of Trnava and its department of political science, where he taught until 2006. He died in Trnava.
