= Dominic Lam (disambiguation) =

Dominic Lam may refer to:

- Dominic Lam (born 1957), Hong Kong-Canadian actor and radio personality
- Dominic Lam (physician), Chinese doctor and artist
