= Domenic =

Domenic is a given name. Notable persons with that name include:

- Domenic Abounader (born 1995), American wrestler
- Domenic Berry (born 1971), Australian footballer (Australian rules)
- Domenic Carosa (born 1974), Australian businessman
- Domenic Cassisi (born 1982), Australian footballer (Australian rules)
- Domenic Cretara (1946–2017), American painter
- Domenic DiBerardino (born 1942), Canadian ice hockey player
- Domenic Figliomeni (born 1969), Canadian boxer
- Domenic Gatto (born 1955), Australian boxer, businessman, and mobster
- Domenic Keller (fl. 2000–2001), Swiss bobsledder
- Domenic Recchia (born 1959), American politician
- Domenic Marte, American singer
- Domenic Mediate (born 1982), American soccer player
- Domenic Mobilio (1969–2004), Canadian soccer player
- Domenic Pittis (born 1974), Canadian ice hockey player
- Domenic Priore (born 1960), American author, historian and television producer
- Domenic Sarno (born 1963), American politician
- Domenic Scrivo (born 1967), Canadian racing driver
- Domenic Troiano (1946–2005), Canadian guitarist
- Domenic Weinstein (born 1994), German racing cyclist

== See also ==
- Dominic
- Domenico
- Dom (given name)
