= Dominic Thomas (academic) =

British academic

- Education: University College London; Yale University
- Occupation: Academic
- Employer: University of California, Los Angeles

Dominic Thomas is a British academic. He is the Madeleine L. Letessier Professor and chair of the Department of French and Francophone Studies at the University of California, Los Angeles (UCLA). He is the author and editor of several books comparative literature and postcolonialism, with a focus on francophone African studies.

== Early life ==
Dominic Thomas graduated from University College London, where he earned a bachelor's degree in French and Philosophy in 1989. He earned a PhD in French from Yale University in 1996.

== Career ==
Thomas was the Dr William M. Scholl Collegiate Professor in Romance Languages and Literatures at the University of Notre Dame from 1996 to 2000. He was professor of French, Francophone Studies and Comparative Literature at the University of California, Los Angeles (UCLA) from 2000 to 2013. Since 2013, he has the Madeleine L. Letessier Professor at UCLA, where he is also the chair of the Department of French and Francophone Studies. He is the author and editor of several books. He became an officer of the Order of Academic Palms in 2016.

His 2002 book, Nation-Building, Propaganda, and Literature in Francophone Africa, focuses on the works of Emmanuel Dongala, Henri Lopès and Sony Lab'ou Tansi, and the way politicians in the Republic of the Congo have used them to craft a narrative of nationalism. Reviewing it for The International Journal of African Historical Studies, professor Phyllis Taoua of the University of Arizona dismissed the book as "a bit thin", adding that it "sheds a rather dim light on the current realities in that deeply troubled region." Professor Claire L. Dehon of Kansas State University agreed, concluding, "Had the author widened his scope of analysis beyond the Congo and explored, even briefly, other national literatures in Francophone Africa, the book would have been more deserving of its title." However, in French Forum, professor Kasongo Mulenda Kapanga of the University of Richmond called it, "a valuable contribution to the study of Congolese novelists Similarly, Harvard University professor Abiola Irele noted, " the work as it stands presents the fundamental preoccupations of Congolese writers and the major lines of articulation of their literature, a corpus that emerges from this study as one of the major areas of contemporary francophone literature."

His 2007 book, Black France: Colonialism, Immigration, and Transnationalism, is a study of comparative literature by francophone African authors like Alain Mabanckou, Bernard Binlin Dadié, Calixthe Beyala, Camara Laye, Fatou Diome, Ferdinand Oyono, Ousmane Sembène, etc. It uses an "interdisciplinary" approach, and "borrows concepts from sociology, literary studies, philosophy, cultural studies, and political science." In the African Studies Review, Professor Jonathan Gosnell of Smith College called it "a short book that will be particularly useful for specialists." Reviewing it for The Journal of African History, Professor Gregory Mann of Columbia University called it "a keen and compelling work of contemporary scholarship." Lydie Moudileno, a professor at the University of Pennsylvania, noted in The International Journal of African Historical Studies that Thomas' book was "timely" given then-President Nicolas Sarkozy's focus on national identity. In The French Review, professor Marjorie Attignol Salvodon of Suffolk University adds that the book "examines the fraught history of the colonial relationship between France and several sub-Saharan African countries with intelligence and lucidity." In a review for French Forum, professor Peter J. Bloom of the University of California, Santa Barbara praised the book, concluding that, "Thomas' deft reassignment of literary and postcolonial categories demonstrates how literary production offers the means by which to redefine and renegotiate the crushing realities often heralded under the rubric of globalization."

In Africa and France: Postcolonial Cultures, Migration, and Racism, Thomas "discusses several aspects of postcolonial contexts with France in mind as well as cultures, migration and racism."

== Political commentary ==
In 2017, Thomas argued that, "Trump’s position on the international stage has led to a widespread consensus that—essentially, that America has vacated the world of foreign policy leadership and ethics and are turning to new leaders."

== Selected works ==
- Thomas, Dominic (2002). Nation-Building, Propaganda, and Literature in Francophone Africa. Bloomington, Indiana: Indiana University Press. OCLC 754023199.
- Thomas, Dominic (2007). Black France: Colonialism, Immigration, and Transnationalism. Bloomington, Indiana: Indiana University Press. ISBN 9780253348210. OCLC 470749101.
- Thomas, Dominic (2013). Africa and France: Postcolonial Cultures, Migration, and Racism. Bloomington, Indiana: Indiana University Press. ISBN 9780253006707. OCLC 855913084.
