= Liptovský Ján =

- Municipality
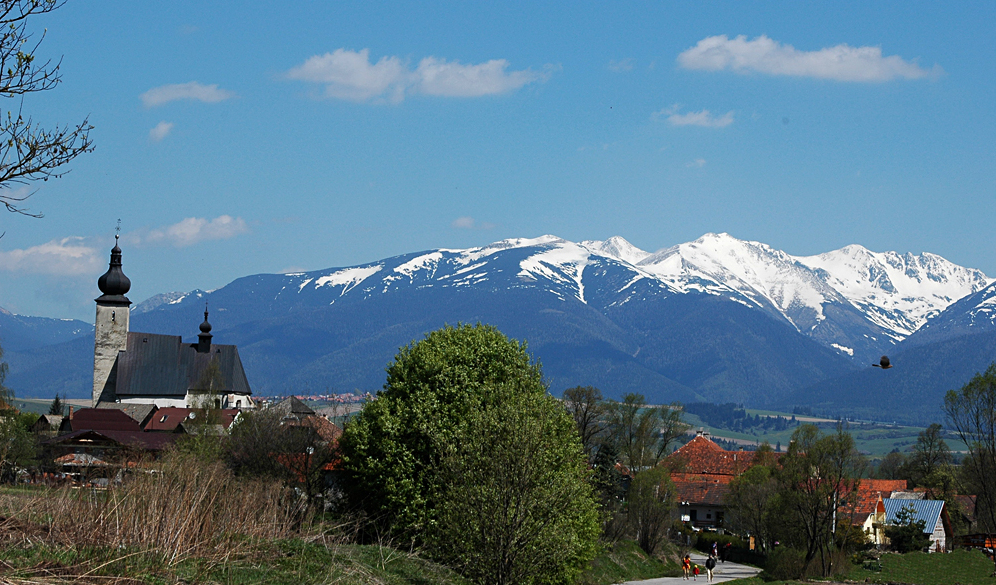

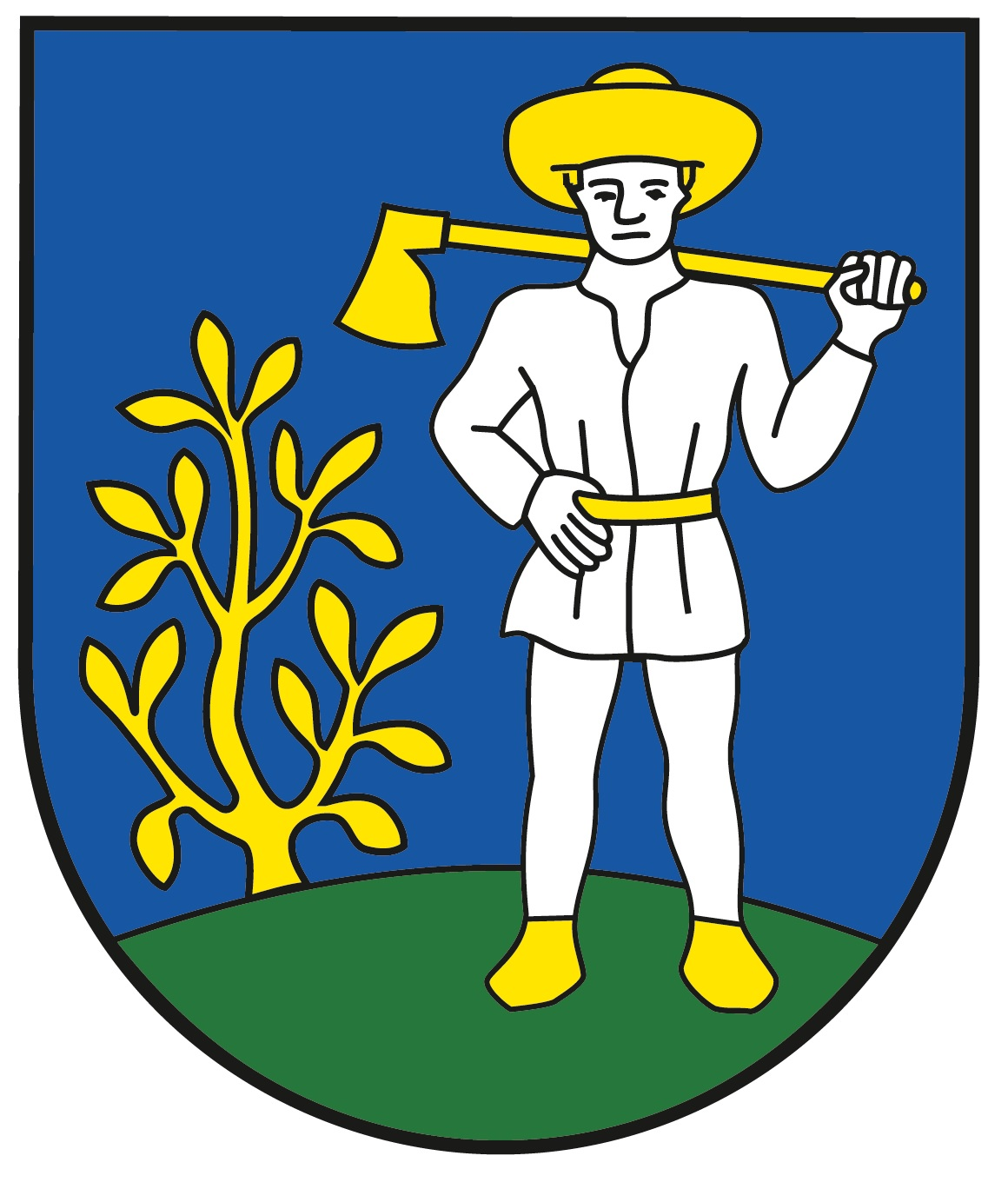
- Flag Coat of arms
- Etymology: church dedicated to St. John
- Location of Liptovský Ján in the Žilina Region Location of Liptovský Ján in Slovakia
- Coordinates: 49.05°N 19.68°E
- Country: Slovakia
- Region: Žilina Region
- District: Liptovský Mikuláš District
- First mentioned: 1263

Area
  - Total: 67.77 km^{2} (26.17 sq mi)
- Elevation: 635 m (2,083 ft)

Population (2025)
  - Total: 1,109
- Time zone: UTC+1 (CET)
  - Summer (DST): UTC+2 (CEST)
- Postal code: 310 3
- Area code: +421 44
- Vehicle registration plate (until 2022): LM
- Website: www.liptovskyjan.sk

Liptovský Ján (Slovak pronunciation: [ˈliptɔwskiː ˈjaːn]; Hungarian: Szentiván) is a spa village and municipality in Liptovský Mikuláš District in the Žilina Region of northern Slovakia.

== History ==
The village was first mentioned in 1263 in historical records. Its traditional name was Sv. Ján, "St. John" (Latin: Sanctus Johannes, Hungarian: Sz.-János, later Szent-Ivány), after the local church. "Saint" was removed by the communist authorities in 1960. Before the establishment of independent Czechoslovakia in 1918, Liptovský Ján was part of Liptó County within the Kingdom of Hungary. From 1939 to 1945, it was part of the Slovak Republic.

== Mineral and hot springs ==
In the region is about 23 mineral springs, some of them are hot springs. The most popular is Teplica spring, also called Kaďa, it contains about 830 milligrams of sulfates per liter. Mineral waters are used for drinking and thermal water swimming pools are open to the public.

== Geography ==
The municipality lies at an altitude of 635 metres (2,083 ft) and covers an area of 67.77 km^{2} (26.17 sq mi) (2025).

== Population ==
Population statistic (10 years)
Year	1995	2005	2015	2025
Count	823	827	1066	1109
Difference		+0.48%	+28.89%	+4.03%

Population statistic
Year	2024	2025
Count	1102	1109
Difference		+0.63%

As of 31 December, 2025, it had a population of 1109 people.

=== Ethnicity ===
Census 2021 (1+ %)
Ethnicity	Number	Fraction
Slovak	1051	95.63%
Not found out	30	2.72%
Czech	14	1.27%
Total	1099	

In year 2021 was 1099 people by ethnicity 1051 as Slovak, 30 as Not found out, 14 as Czech, 10 as Russian, 4 as Other, 1 as Jewish, 1 as Ukrainian, 1 as Polish and 1 as Hungarian.

Note on population: The difference values of population numbers in the table "Population statistic" and in the sections "Ethnicity" & "Religion" is caused by the use of various statistical methods.

=== Religion ===
Census 2021 (1+ %)
Religion	Number	Fraction
None	417	37.94%
Evangelical Church	345	31.39%
Roman Catholic Church	242	22.02%
Not found out	40	3.64%
Greek Catholic Church	17	1.55%
Jehovah's Witnesses	14	1.27%
Total	1099	

In year 2021 was 1099 people by religion 417 from None, 345 from Evangelical Church, 242 from Roman Catholic Church, 40 from Not found out, 17 from Greek Catholic Church, 14 from Jehovah's Witnesses, 7 from Other, 4 from Eastern Orthodox Church, 3 from Other and not ascertained christian church, 3 from Buddhism, 3 from Ad hoc movements, 2 from Old Catholic Church, 1 from Christian Congregations in Slovakia and 1 from Baptists Church.

== Notable people ==
- Martin Szentiványi (1633-1708), baroque scholar
