= Domenick =

Domenick is an English-language masculine given name and surname. As a given name, it is a spelling variant of Dominic, which means "lordly". As a surname, it is an Americanized form of Italian Domenico, also derived from Dominic.

== Given name ==
Notable people with the name include:

- Domenick Davies (born 1978), German rugby union player
- Domenick DiCicco (1963–2024), American politician
- Domenick L. Gabrielli (1912–1994), American lawyer, politician and judge
- Dom Irrera (full name Domenick Irrera; born 1948), American actor and stand-up comedian
- Domenick Lombardozzi (born 1976), American actor
- Don Vultaggio (real name Domenick Vultaggio; born 1951/52), American businessman

== Surname ==
- John Domenick (born 1946), American politician
