= Dominika =

Dominika is a Czech, Polish and Slovak female given name, a counterpart of the name Dominik. Notable people with the name include:

- Dominika Červenková (born 1988), Czech rhythmic gymnast
- Dominika Chorosińska (born 1978), Polish actress
- Dominika Cibulková (born 1989), Slovak tennis player
- Dominika Čonč (born 1993), Slovenian footballer
- Dominika Furmanová (born 1975), Czech journalist and writer
- Dominika Hašková (born 1995), Czech singer
- Dominika Kaňáková (born 1991), Czech tennis player
- Dominika Kavaschová (born 1989), Slovak actress
- Dominika Kopińska (born 1999), Polish footballer
- Dominika Krois (born 1972), Polish civil servant and diplomat
- Dominika Kulczyk (born 1977), Polish businesswoman
- Dominika Mirgová (born 1991), Slovak singer and actress
- Dominika Ostałowska (born 1971), Polish film, television and theatre actress
- Dominika Paleta (born 1972), Polish-born Mexican actress
- Dominika Peczynski (born 1971), Swedish singer, model and television host
- Dominika Piątkowska (born 1986), Polish skater
- Dominika van Santen (born 1983), Venezuelan model and dancer
- Dominika Słowik (born 1988), Polish writer
- Dominika Stará (born 1993), Slovak pop singer
- Dominika Wolski (born 1975), Polish-Canadian actress
