= Dominik Drdul =

Slovak politician (born 1997)

Member of the National Council of the Slovak Republic
- In office 12 May 2020 – 25 October 2023

Personal details
- Born: 28 November 1997 (age 28) Trnava, Slovakia
- Party: OĽaNO
- Education: University of Trnava
- Occupation: Activist, lawyer

Dominik Drdul (born 28 November 1997) is a Slovak politician, lawyer and disability rights activist. He served as a member of the National Council of the Slovak Republic from 2020 to 2023 for the Ordinary People and Independent Personalities (OĽaNO) movement. At the time of his election he was the youngest member of parliament in Slovak history at the age of 22.

== Early life and education ==
Drdul was born on 28 November 1997 in Trnava. He was born with spina bifida and hydrocephalus and has used a wheelchair since early childhood. His parents, being trained in pedagogy emphasised independence; he attended mainstream primary school and selective grammar school.

He studied law at the University of Trnava. Already as a high school student he was active in disability advocacy. In 2014 he spoke at a European Commission event in Brussels about the struggles of disabled person. In 2016 he completed an internship with MEP Jana Žitňanská. He received the Student Personality of Slovakia award in the law category awarded by Junior Chamber International.

== Political career ==
Drdul first stood in the 2019 European Parliament elections for OĽaNO (5th place on the list) but was not elected. In the 2020 parliamentary elections he was placed 20th on the OĽaNO-led list and was elected with 6,334 preferential votes, becoming the youngest MP in the history of the National Council at the age of 22.

During his term he focused on disability rights and accessibility. He supported legislation that significantly increased state contributions for the compensation of severe disability, including for housing adaptation and the purchase of motor vehicles. He served on parliamentary committees including the Special Control Committee for the National Security Authority and the Constitutional and Legal Affairs Committee. In the 2023 elections he ran from 34th place on the list of Hnutie Slovensko but did not retain a seat.

== Underage texting allegations ==
In late July 2026 Czech media outlet CNN Prima NEWS reported, and Slovak outlets subsequently confirmed, that Dominik Drdul had engaged in online conversations on Instagram with three profiles presented as 13- and 14-year-old girls from Czech Republic, during which he sent intimate photographs. The profiles were operated by two 17-year-old Czech individuals acting as “predator hunters”. Drdul initially denied knowledge of the communications; he later stated that ages cannot be reliably verified on social media and that private messages should not have been published.

Igor Matovič, leader of the Slovakia Movement (rebranded OĽaNO), publicly distanced the movement from Drdul, stating that they had had no connection for years, that Drdul had not been a member, and adding that the movement could not be held responsible for the actions of an adult.

As of early August 2026 the Slovak General Prosecutor's Office had begun reviewing the possibility of pressing criminal charges. Soon after the Slovak police launched a criminal prosecution in the matter of the crime of attempting production of child pornography and endangering the moral upbringing of youth.

== Personal life ==
Drdul lives in Trnava. Despite his disability, he holds a driving licence, drives, exercises regularly and has described himself as largely independent in daily life. He remains outspoken about barriers faced by people with disabilities in Slovakia and the need for genuine inclusion rather than purely formal accessibility measures.
