= Zuzana Števulová =

Slovak lawyer, lecturer and activist (born 1983)

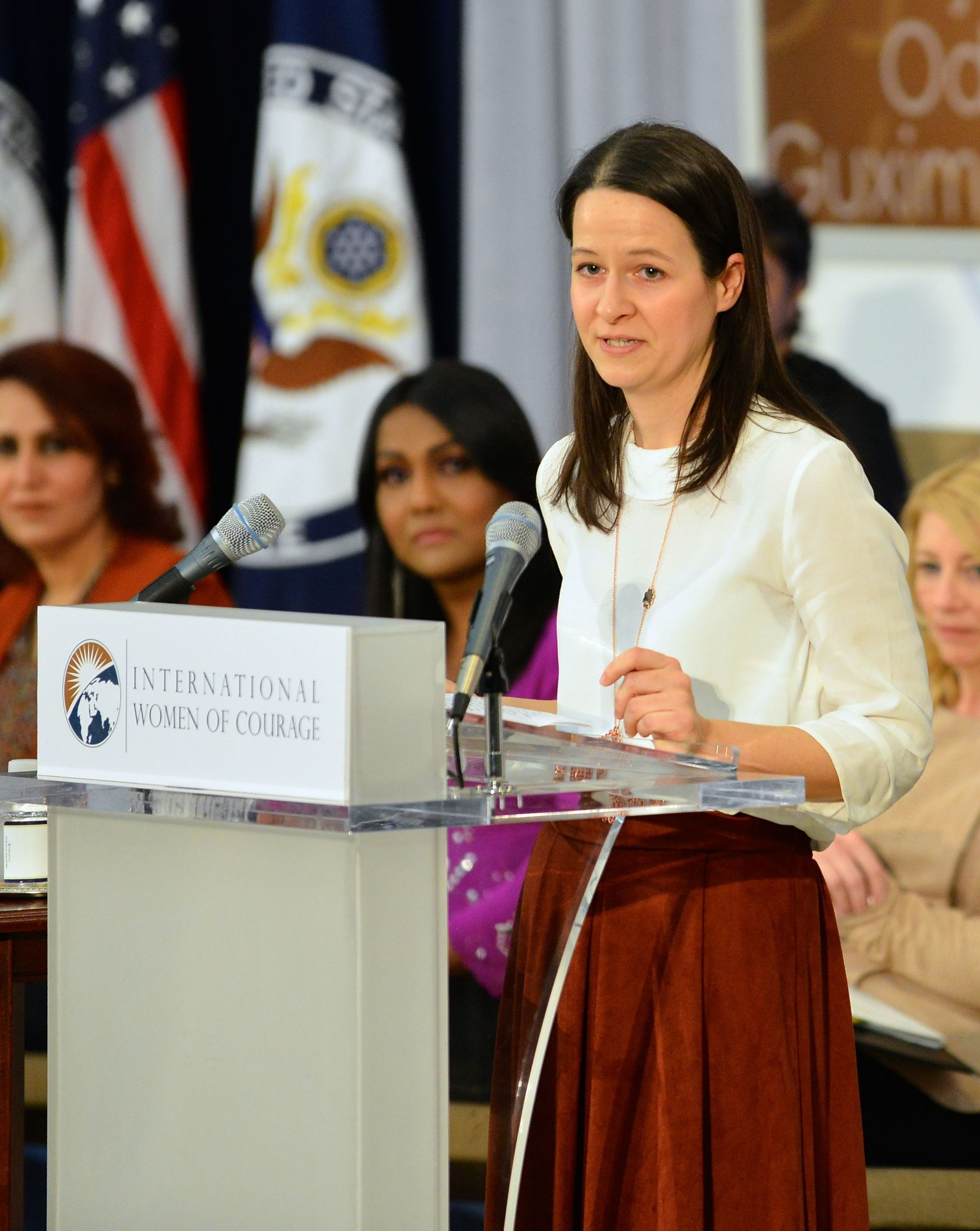
- in Washington in 2016

Member of the Slovak National Council
- Incumbent
- Assumed office 25 October 2023

Personal details
- Born: 24 July 1983 (age 43) Martin, Czechoslovakia
- Party: Progressive Slovakia
- Education: PhD
- Occupation: Lawyer, Politician
- Known for: human rights campaigner

Zuzana Števulová (born 24 July 1983) is a Slovak politician, lawyer, lecturer and migrants' rights activist. She was the first Slovak to be given an International Women of Courage Award. In 2023 she was elected as an MP of the National Council of Slovakia.

== Early life and career ==
Števulová was born in Slovakia in 1983. She is lecturer at the University of Trnava in Slovakia. She helped create the Integration Policy for the Slovak Republic.

She had campaigned for the rights of refugees and migrants arriving in Europe and in 2016 she was the first Slovak to be given an International Women of Courage Award in Washington DC. She has won important cases to overturn refusals in Slovakia to grant political asylum and to support the rights of the migrants in her country.
