= University of Trnava =

University in Slovakia

University of Trnava (in Trnava)
- Trnavská univerzita v Trnave
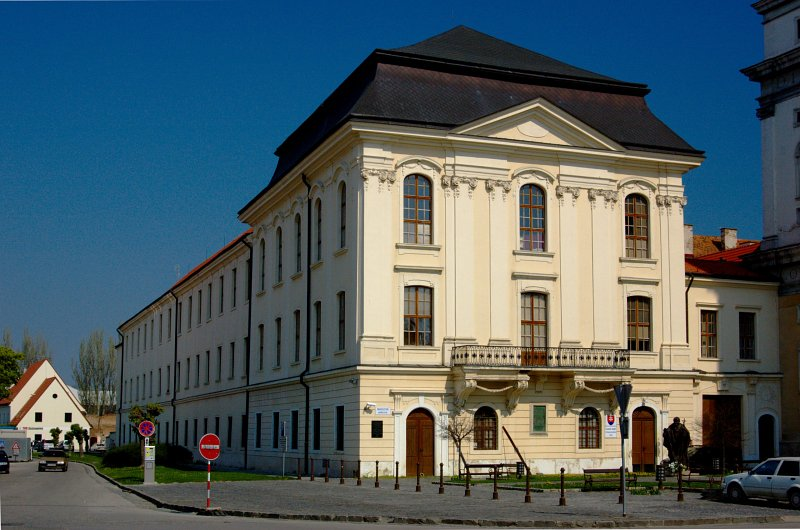
- Latin: Universitas Tyrnaviensis
- Type: Public
- Established: 1635 (historical)/1992 (present)
- Affiliations: ERASMUS
- Rector: Prof. PaedDr. René Bílik, PhD.
- Students: 4,671
- Location: Hornopotočná 23, 918 43 Trnava, Trnava, Slovakia; 48.3797181°N 17.5867669°E
- Website: truni.sk
- Location within Trnava Region Location within Slovakia

The University of Trnava (in Trnava) (Slovak: Trnavská univerzita v Trnave) is based in Trnava, in western Slovakia. The university's presence in the town has historical antecedents as the University of Nagyszombat was operating there throughout the 17th and 18th century (present day Eötvös Loránd University in Budapest).

== Historical university ==
The original Jesuit university was founded in 1635 by the Archbishop of Esztergom, Péter Pázmány in the Kingdom of Hungary. It had a faculty of arts, faculty of theology, faculty of law (since 1667) and faculty of medicine (since 1769). The university lasted 142 years in Trnava (German: Tyrnau; Hungarian: Nagyszombat) after which it was moved to Buda in 1777 and finally to Pest in 1784. Its legal successor is Eötvös Loránd University in Budapest, Hungary. The Faculty of Theology is now Pázmány Péter Catholic University (in Budapest and Esztergom).

In the first academic year, out of forty-eight external logicians, 39.85% were Hungarian, 8.31% were Transylvanian, 4.16% were Croatian, nobles accounted for 56.48%, while the bourgeoisie represented 33.36%. There was also one libertine, two foreigners, and two with an undetermined status. In terms of territorial distribution, 52% were from Hungary, 12.5% from Croatia, 10.4% from Transylvania, 4.16% from abroad, and 22.5% from unknown locations. Since students came from various regions within Hungary, it can be said that the university became not only the university of Nagyszombat and its surroundings but also of the entire country, and its reputation reached abroad as well. (The 1637-1638 data show the same picture but with much less accuracy and more missing data.) As the researchers indicated the age of the grammar school students next to their names (eight to sixteen years old for the lower forms and fifteen to twenty-seven years old for the upper forms), they estimate the age of the graduating humanities students to be twenty-three to twenty-four and that of the theologians to be twenty-seven to twenty-eight years old.

=== Notable staff at Historical University ===
- Martin Szentiványi, baroque scholar

== Present-day university ==
The present-day university was established in 1992 and it isn't the legal successor of the 17th century institution. It currently has five faculties, 4 of them seated in Trnava:

- Faculty of Philosophy and Arts
- Faculty of Education
- Faculty of Health and Social care
- Faculty of Law

and 1 in Bratislava:

- Faculty of Theology

== Notable staff ==
- Peter Blaho, legal scholar
- Michal Horský, political scientist
- Vladimír Krčméry, physician and humanitarian
- Zuzana Števulová, award-winning lawyer, politician

== See also ==
- List of early modern universities in Europe
- List of Jesuit sites

== Literature ==
- Sinkovics, 1985. = Az Eötvös Loránd Tudományegyetem története 1635–1985. Szerk.: Sinkovics István. Budapest, 1985, ELTE
