= Dom (given name) =

Dom is a masculine given name, frequently a short form (hypocorism) of Dominic or Domenic. It may refer to:

== People ==
- Dom Barry (born 1994), Australian rules footballer
- Dom Belza, American politician
- Dominic Brown (born 1972), English guitarist for Duran Duran
- Dom Capers (born 1950), American National Football League coach
- Dom Cardillo (1930–2013), Canadian politician
- Dom Costa (born 1951), American politician
- Dom DeLuise (1933–2009), American actor and comedian
- Dom DiMaggio (1917–2009), American Major League Baseball player
- Dom Dwyer (born 1990), English footballer
- Dom Enright (1935–2008), Irish hurler
- Dom Flora (1935–2021), American former college basketball player
- Dominic Howard (born 1977), drummer for the English rock band Muse
- Dom Joly (born 1967), English television comedian and journalist
- Dom Jones (born 2000), American football player
- Dom Mariani (born 1958), Australian guitarist, vocalist, producer and songwriter
- Dom Michael (born 1987), Australian cricketer
- Dom O'Donnell, Gaelic footballer from the 1950s to 1970
- Dom Reardon, British comics artist
- Dom Mintoff (1916–2012), Maltese politician, journalist, and architect, former Prime Minister of Malta
- Dom Phillips (1964–2022), British freelance journalist
- Dom Um Romão (1925–2005), Brazilian jazz drummer and percussionist
- Dom Sheed (born 1995), Australian rules footballer
- Dom Shipperley (born 1991), Australian rugby union footballer
- Dom Sigillo (1913–1957), American National Football League player
- Dom Speakman (born 1994), English rugby league player
- Dom Sullivan (born 1951), Scottish former football player and manager
- Dom Thomas (born 1996), Scottish footballer
- Dom Turner (fl. 1988–present), Australian blues guitarist, vocalist and songwriter for the blues band The Backsliders
- Dom Tyson (born 1993), Australian rules footballer
- Dominic Wood (born 1978), British children's entertainer and TV presenter

== Fictional characters ==
- Dominic "Dom" James, in the 2021 film Space Jam: A New Legacy
- Dom Nguyen, in the webcomics MegaTokyo and Okashina Okashi – Strange Candy, inspired by the real-life entertainment writer of the same name
- Dom Perino, in Degrassi: The Next Generation
- Dominic Reilly, in the soap opera Hollyoaks
- Dominic Thompson, in the New Zealand soap opera Shortland Street
- Dominic Toretto, in the American action film franchise The Fast and the Furious
