= Dominykas =

- Gender: Male
- Language: Lithuanian
- Name day: 9 March

Origin
- Region of origin: Lithuania

Other names
- Related names: Dominic

Dominykas is a Lithuanian masculine given name, a Lithuanian variant of the name Dominic. People bearing the name Dominykas include:

- Dominykas Domarkas (born 1992), basketball player
- Dominykas Galkevičius (born 1986), footballer
- Dominykas Jančionis (born 1993), rower
- Dominykas Milka (born 1992), basketball player
