= Domenic DiBerardino =

Canadian ice hockey player

- Born: July 13, 1942 (age 83) Timmins, Ontario, Canada
- Height: 5 ft 7 in (170 cm)
- Weight: 170 lb (77 kg; 12 st 2 lb)
- Position: Right wing
- Shot: Left
- Played for: Philadelphia Ramblers; Clinton Comets; Jacksonville Rockets; Nashville Dixie Flyers; Greensboro Generals
- Playing career: 1958–1971

Domenic Carmine "Dom" DiBerardino (born July 13, 1942) is a Canadian retired professional hockey player who played 588 games in the Eastern Hockey League with the Philadelphia Ramblers, Clinton Comets, Jacksonville Rockets, Nashville Dixie Flyers, and Greensboro Generals.
