= Dominic Burke =

Dominic or Dominick Burke may refer to:

- Dominic Burke (Dominican) (c. 1603 – 1649), Irish Dominican priest and political agent
- Dominic Burke (bishop) (died 1704), Irish Roman Catholic bishop of Elphin, 1671–1704
- Dominick Burke (died 1747), Irish politician
- Dominic Burke (businessman) (born 1958), British businessman
