= Maria Domenica Scanferla =

Italian artist (1726–1763)

Maria Domenica Scanferla (December 14, 1726 – October 12, 1763) was an Italian painter and pastellist.

Born in Padua, Republic of Venice, and sometimes called "Marietta", Scanferla was of modest origin and turned herself to the study of painting when she was twenty. She is known to have copied the work of Giambattista Tiepolo, among others. At her death, she was interred in the church of Santo Spirito, Padua, where a memorial in her honor was raised. A memoir of her life was published in 1766. A portrait by her of Cardinal Sante Veronese is also known, as are portraits of the future Pope Clement XIII and Jacopo Facciolati.
