= Dominik Leyh =

German politician (born 1989)

Member of the Landtag of Hesse
- Incumbent
- Assumed office 18 January 2024
- Preceded by: Günter Rudolph
- Constituency: Schwalm-Eder I

Personal details
- Born: 9 August 1989 (age 37)
- Party: Christian Democratic Union (since 2005)

Dominik Leyh (born 9 August 1989) is a German politician serving as a member of the Landtag of Hesse since 2024. From 2017 to 2019, he served as chairman of the Young Union in North Hesse.
