= Doménica Montero =

Doménica Montero may refer to either of two Mexican telenovelas:

- Doménica Montero (1978 TV series)
- Doménica Montero (2025 TV series), a remake of the 1978 telenovela
