= Martin Szentiványi =

Hungarian Jesuit writer and theologian

Martin Szentiványi (born at Szentiván, present-day Liptovský Ján, 20 October 1633 and died at Nagyszombat, present-day Trnava, 5 March 1708) was a polymathic Hungarian Jesuit writer and theologian. His 4000 page work, titled Miscellanea, brings papers from all fields of science.

== Life ==
He entered the Society of Jesus in 1653, and was professor of Scripture for five years at Vienna and Nagyszombat, professor of mathematics and philosophy for nine years, and professor of canon law and theology for seven years. For seven years he filled the office of the chancellor of the University of Nagyszombat, and in addition was for nine successive years governor of the Pázmáneum in Vienna and of the academy at Nagyszombat.

Martin Szentiványi was lecturer at the University of Nagyszombat in 1668 – 1705.

== Works ==
His numerous writings appeared in Hungarian, Latin, German, and Slovak, and some were translated into French. They include:

- "Curiosiora et selectiora variarum scientiarum miscellanea in tres partes divisa" (Tyrnau, 1689);
- "Dissertationes septem, etc." (Tyrnau, 1689);
- "Rectus modus interpretandi scripturam sacram" (Tyrnau, 1696);
- "Summarium chronologiæ Hungariæ" (Tyrnau, 1697);
- "Hungaria in immaculatum conceptionem b. Mariæ Virginis magnæ dominæ suæ credens et iuvans" (Tyrnau, 1701);
- "Doctrinæ fidei christianæ" (Louvain, 1708);
- "Lutheranicum numquam et nusquam" (Tyrnau, 1702);
- "Relatio satatus futuro vitæ" (Tyrnau, 1699);
- "Dissertationes hæresiologico-polemicæ de hæresiarchis; hæresibus, et erroribus in fide dogmatibus, hoc sæculo nostro" (Tyrnau, 1701);
- "Solutiones catholicæ, etc." (Tyrnau, 1701);
- "Quinquaginta rationes et motiva cur in tanta varietate religionum et confessionum fidei in christianitate moderno tempore vigentium, sola religio Romano-catholica sit eligenda et omnibus aliis preferenda" (Tyrnau, 1701; German and Hungarian, Tyrnau, 1702).
