= Il Blues della domenica sera =

- Directed by: Valerio Zurlini
- Music by: Mario Nascimbene
- Release date: 1951
- Country: Italy
- Language: Italian

Il Blues della domenica sera is a 1951 Italian short documentary film directed by Valerio Zurlini.
