= Trnava =

City in Slovakia

- City
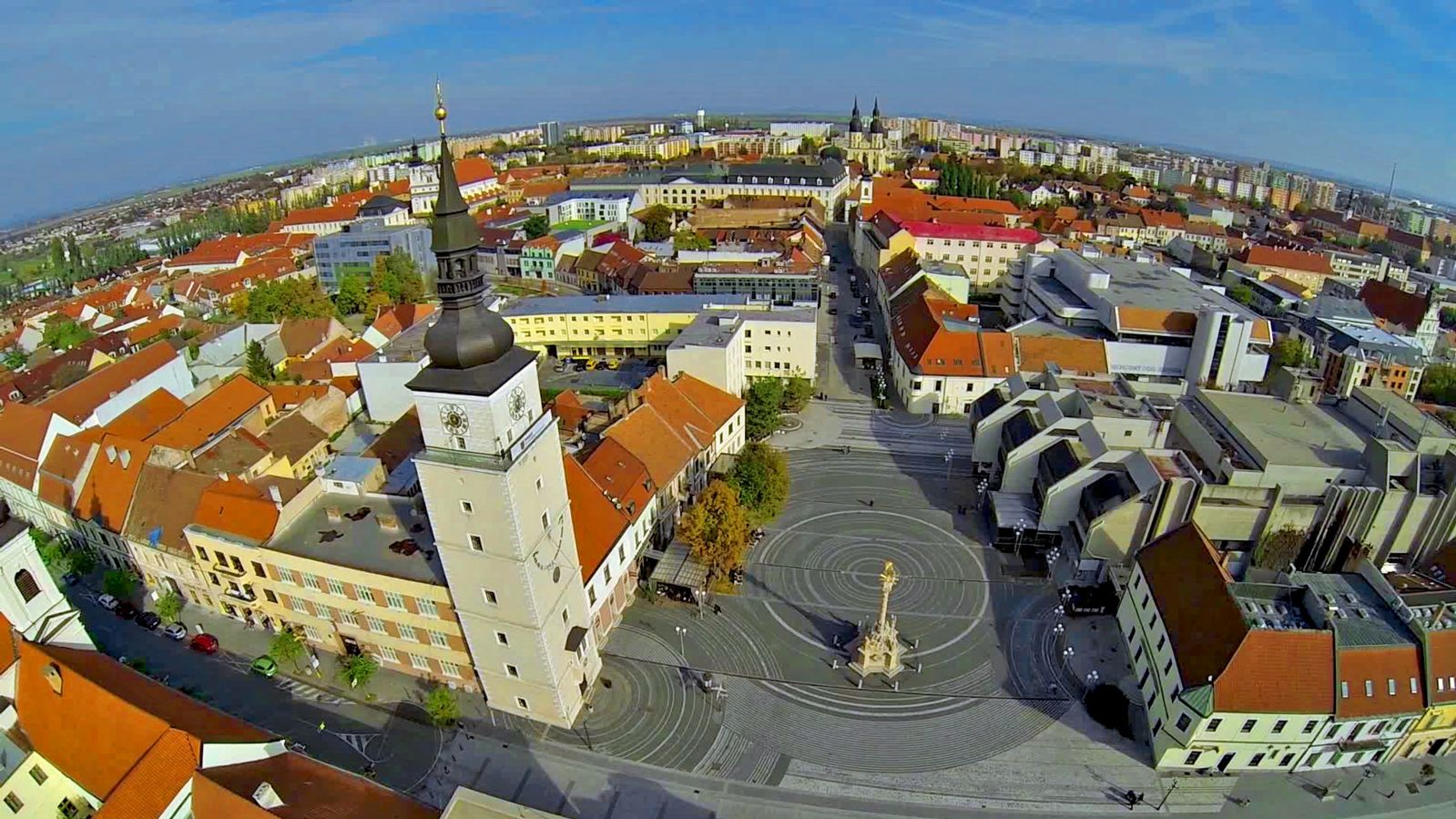
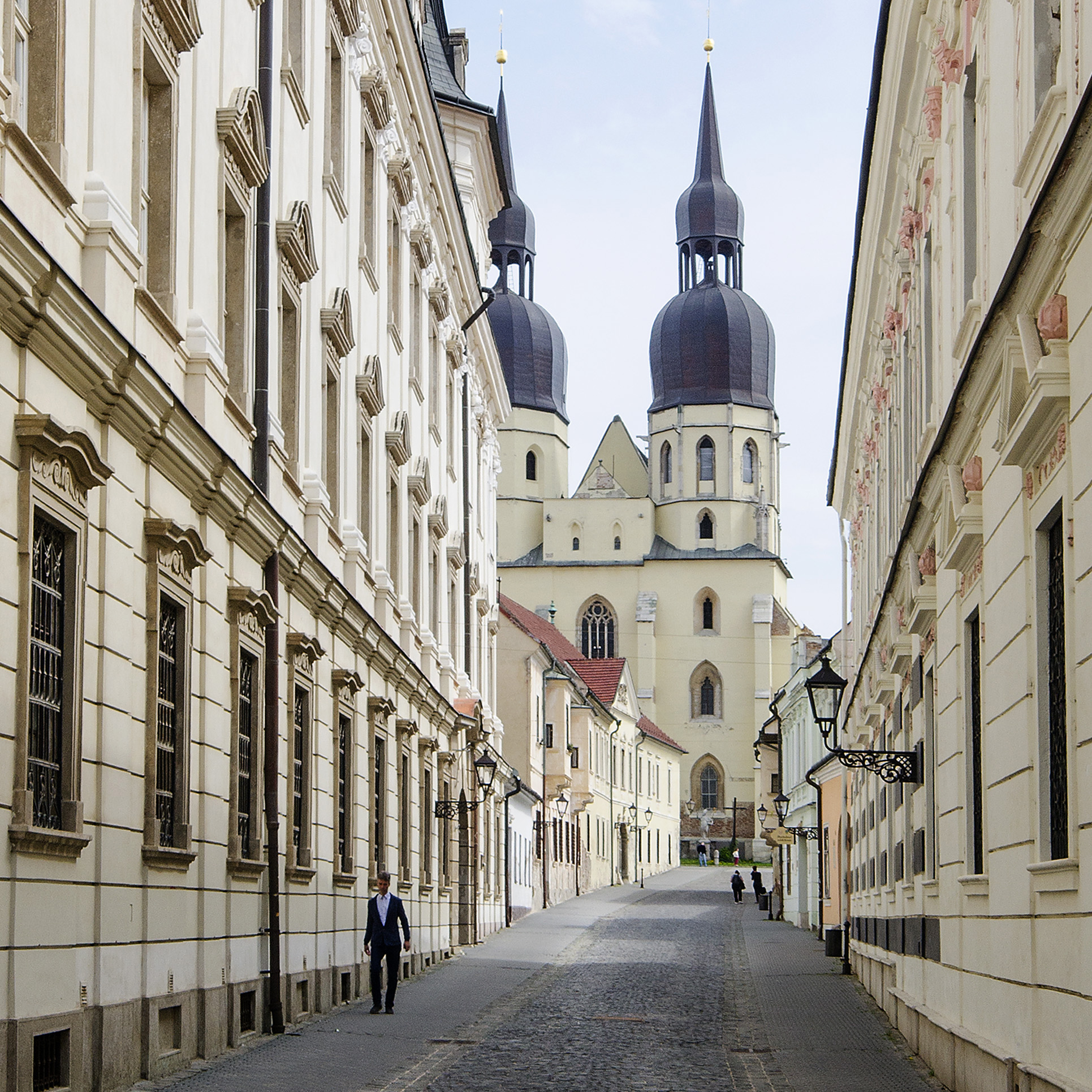
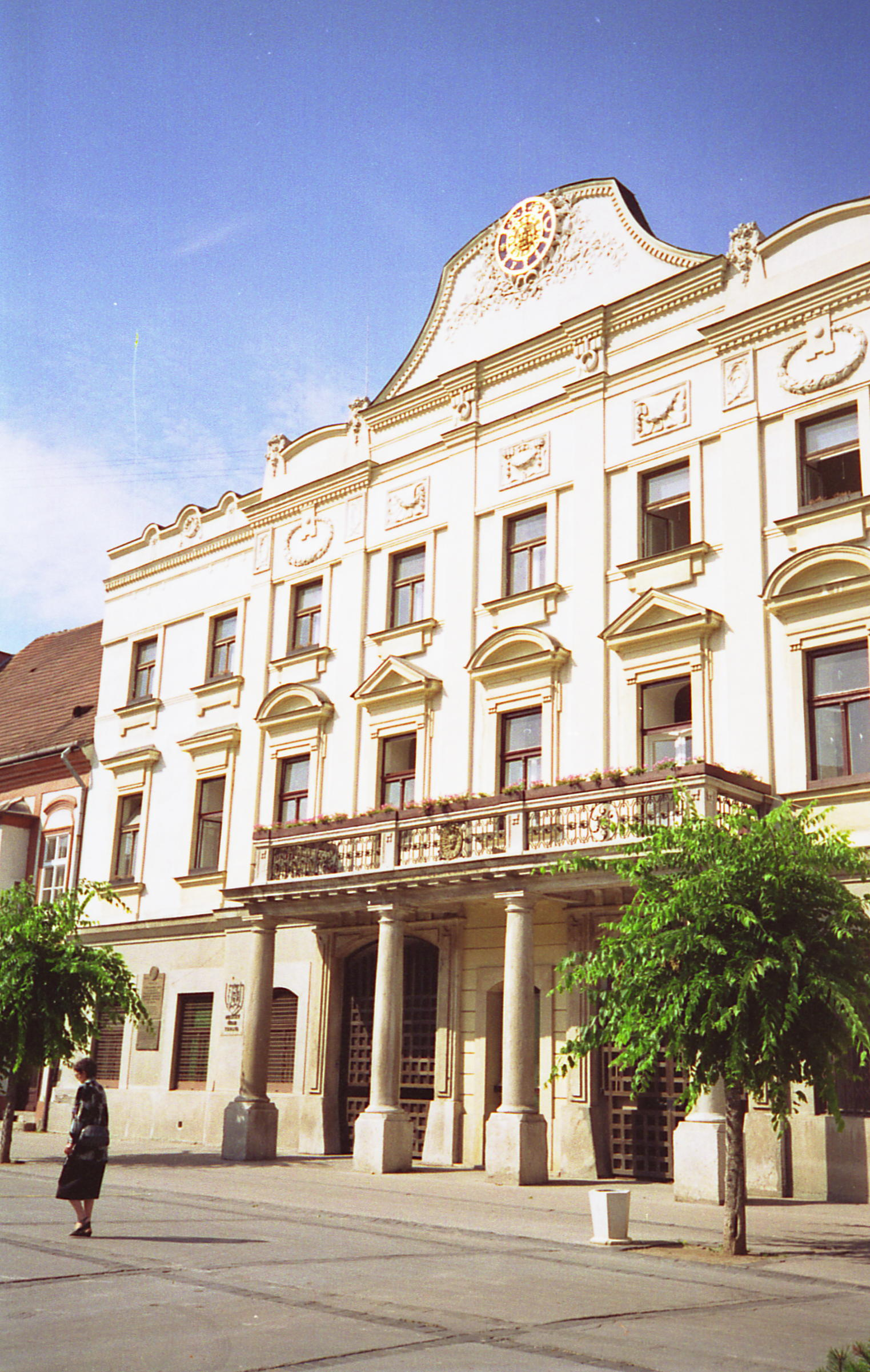
- From the top, Panoramic view of Trnava, Basilica of Saint Nicholas, Trnava Town Hall

- Flag Coat of arms
- Nickname: Malý Rím (Little Rome)
- Location of Trnava in the Trnava Region Location of Trnava in Slovakia
- Coordinates: 48°22′39″N 17°35′18″E
- Country: Slovakia
- Region: Trnava Region
- District: Trnava District
- First mentioned: 1211

Government
  - Mayor: Eva Nemčovská (Independent)

Area
  - Total: 71.53 km^{2} (27.62 sq mi)
- (2022)
- Elevation: 144 m (472 ft)

Population (2025)
  - Total: 63,184
- Demonym(s): Trnavčan (m.); Trnavčanka (f.) (sk)
- Time zone: UTC+1 (CET)
  - Summer (DST): UTC+2 (CEST)
- Postal code: 917 00
- Area code: +421 33
- Vehicle registration plate (until 2022): TT
- Website: trnava.sk

Trnava (Slovak pronunciation: [ˈtr̩naʋa], German: Tyrnau, German: [ˈtʏrnaʊ̯]; Hungarian: Nagyszombat [ˈnɒcsombɒt], also known by other alternative names) is a city in western Slovakia, 47 km (29 mi) to the northeast of Bratislava, on the Trnávka river. It is the capital of the Trnava Region and the Trnava District. It is the seat of a Roman Catholic archbishopric (1541–1820 and then again since 1977). The city has a historic center. Because of the many churches within its city walls, Trnava has often been called "Little Rome" (Slovak: Malý Rím, Latin: parva Roma), or more recently, the "Slovak Rome".

== Names and etymology ==
The name of the city is derived from the name of the creek Trnava. It comes from the Old Slavic/Slovak word tŕň ("thornbush") which characterized the river banks in the region. Many towns in Central and Eastern Europe have a similar etymology including Trnovo in Slovakia as well as Tarnów (Poland), Tarnow (Germany), Veliko Tarnovo (Bulgaria), Târnăveni (Romania), Trnava and Trnavac (Serbia), and Tyrnavos (Greece) among others. In Hungarian, the original name had gradually evolved into Tyrna (Note: Trnava → Turnava (a vowel insertion) → Turnva (a vowel removal like in malina → málna) → Turna–Torna (a consonant removal like svent → szent).) which influenced also later German and Latin forms.

When it developed into an important market town, it received the Hungarian name of Nagyszombat (Sumbot 1211), literally "Great Saturday", referring to the weekly market fairs held on Saturdays (Hungarian: szombat). However, this name was only used by the royal chamber, as is indicated by the adoption of the Slovak name rather than the Hungarian name by German newcomers after the Mongol invasion.

The varieties of the name in different languages include German: Tyrnau; Hungarian: Nagyszombat (from the 14th century onward) and Latin: Tyrnavia.

== History ==
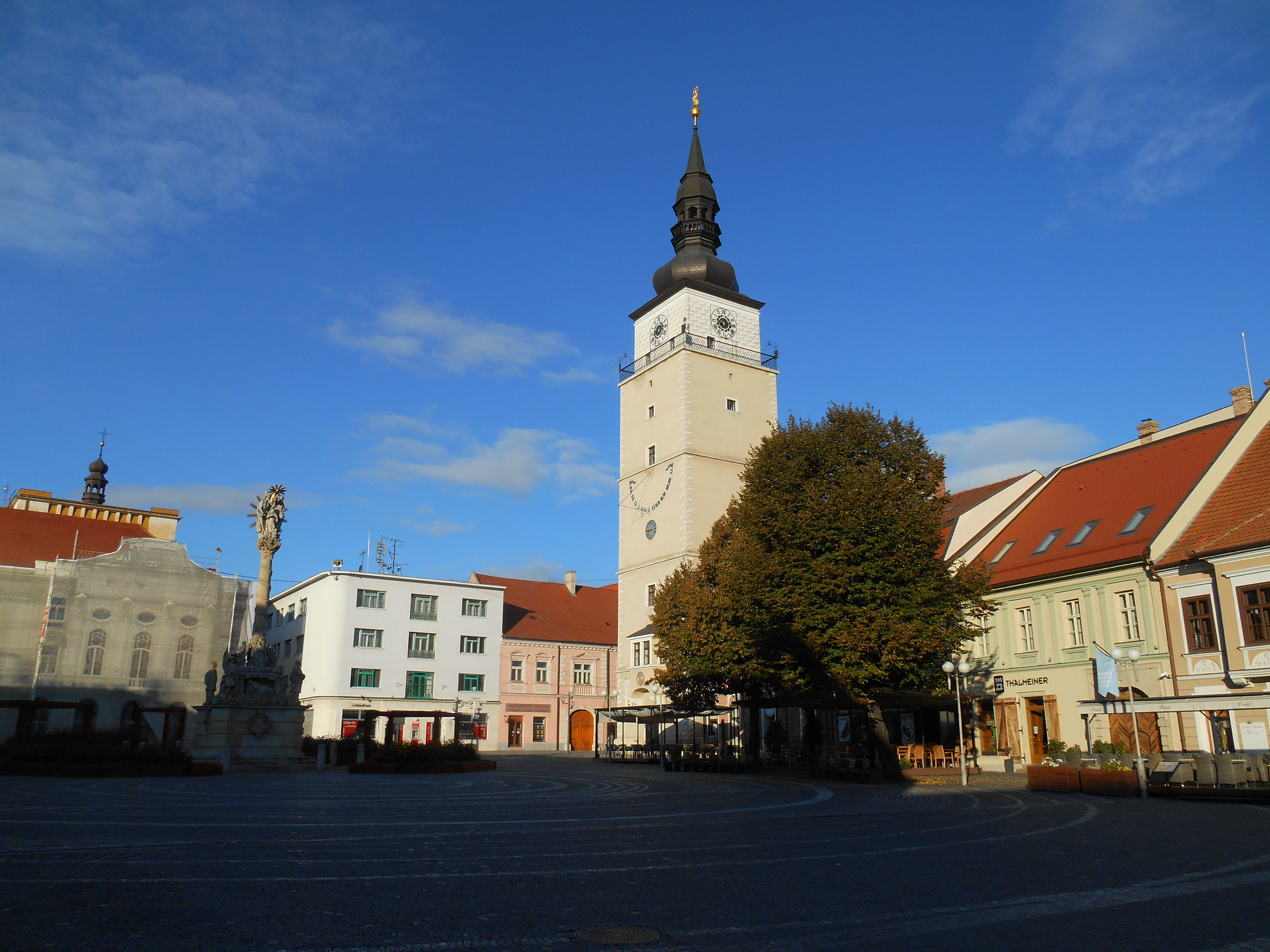
Square of the Holy Trinity

Permanent settlements on the city's territory are known from the Neolithic period onwards.

=== Middle Ages ===
During the Middle Ages, an important market settlement arose here at the junction of two important roads – from Bohemia to Hungary and from the Mediterranean to Poland.

The first written reference to Trnava dates from 1211. In 1238, Trnava was the first town in (present-day) Slovakia to be granted a town charter (civic privileges) by the king. The former agricultural center gradually became a center of manufacture, trade, and crafts. By the early 13th century, the king of Hungary had invited numerous Germans to settle in Trnava; this settlement increased after the Tatar invasion in 1242. At the turn of the 13th and 14th centuries, a part of Trnava was enclosed by very long city walls. The original Hungarian and Slovak market settlement and the Germans stayed behind this wall.

Trnava was also the place of many important negotiations: Charles I, the king of Hungary, signed here a currency agreement with the Czech King John of Luxemburg in 1327, and King Louis I (who often stayed in the town and died there in 1382) signed a friendship agreement with Emperor Charles IV there in 1360.

==== Hussites and Slovak majority ====
The temporary German majority in Trnava's population yielded in favour of the Slovaks during the campaigns undertaken by the Czech Hussites in the 15th century. In April 1430, the Hussites penetrated close to the town and defeated the Hungarian army in the Battle of Trnava. However, they suffered heavy losses and withdrew to Moravia. On 24 June 1432, a small group of Hussites masked as tradesmen entered the town, overcame the guards in the night, and captured the town without a fight. Then, they made Trnava the center of their campaigns in northwestern Kingdom of Hungary from 1432 to 1435.

=== 16th–18th centuries ===
The town, along with the rest of the territory of present-day Slovakia, gained importance after the conquest of most of what is today Hungary by the Ottoman Empire in 1541, when Trnava became the see (1541–1820) of the Archbishopric of Esztergom (before 1541 and after 1820 the see was the town of Esztergom, which was conquered by the Ottoman Turks in 1543). The cathedrals of the archbishopric were the Saint John the Baptist Cathedral and the Saint Nicholas Cathedral in the town. Many ethnic Hungarians fleeing from the Turks moved to the town after 1541, also from present-day Hungary, which mainly remained under Ottoman rule until being gradually reconquered and the last Ottoman troops on present-day Hungarian territory were defeated in 1699.

In the 16th and especially the 17th century, Trnava was an important center of the Counter-Reformation in the Kingdom of Hungary (at the time largely identical with the territory of present-day Slovakia and a strip of western Hungary). The Archbishop Nicolaus Olahus invited the Jesuits to Trnava in 1561 to develop the municipal school system. Subsequently, he had a seminary opened in 1566, and in 1577, Trnava's priest Nicolas Telegdi founded a book-printing house in the town. The first Catholic Bible translation into Hungarian (based on the Latin Vulgate) was also completed in the town by the Jesuit György Káldi, who was born there in 1573. The 17th century was also characterized by many anti-Habsburg uprisings in the country – these revolts of Stephen Bocskay, Gabriel Bethlen, George I Rákóczi, and Imre Thököly negatively affected Trnava's life. On 26 December 1704, Francis II Rákóczi's army suffered a decisive defeat against the Imperial Army, led by Sigbert Heister, near Trnava.

It was after the establishment of the archbishopric and canonry that Trnava acquired the nickname of "A Little Rome". As the city of Rome was a center of the universal Catholic Church, the town of Trnava had been seen in popular view as the center of Catholicism in the Kingdom of Hungary. As contemporary scholar Matthias Bel wrote: "You could say it is a town which is appearing as Rome on a small scale, and this, as to temples and also sacred institutions which were infused within it. Truly, that's why the people call it a Little Rome, knowing that small things are compared with big ones."

The Jesuit Trnava University (1635–1777), the only university of the Kingdom of Hungary at that time, was founded by Archbishop Péter Pázmány. Founded to support the Counter-Reformation, Trnava University soon became a center of Slovak education and literature, since some of the teachers and half of the students were Slovaks.

Pázmány himself was instrumental in promoting the usage of Slovak instead of Czech and had his work "Isteni igazságra vezető kalauz" (Guide to the Truth of God) and several of his sermons translated into Slovak.

From the late 18th century Trnava became a center of the literary and artistic Slovak National Revival. The first standard codification of Slovak (by the priest Anton Bernolák in 1787) was based on the Slovak dialect used in the region of Trnava.

=== 19th century to Great War ===
In 1820, the seat of the Hungarian archbishopric was transferred back to Esztergom, and Trnava ceased to be the religious center of the historic Kingdom of Hungary.

The importance of the town increased again when Trnava was connected with Bratislava through the horse-drawn railway.

In 1838 Pozsony-Nagyszombati Első Magyar Vasúttársaság (First Hungarian Bratislava–Trnava Railway Company) was founded in order to connect royal towns with railway system. In 1840 horse-drawn railway started to operate on the route Bratislava–Svätý Jur, as the first railway line in the Kingdom of Hungary. With connection to Trnava, the planned route was solemnly opened in June 1846 to be later prolonged to Sered in December 1846.

During the Hungarian Revolution of 1848 Richard Guyon's army had been repulsed out of Trnava after clash with an Austrian army under command of Balthasar von Simunich on 14 December, in 1848.

=== In time after Austro-Hungarian Compromise ===
In 1867 Austro-Hungarian compromise had come into force, becoming a milestone in the politics and administration of the empire. For this period had been determined as a self-governed urban district (rendezett tanácsú város/Stadt mit geordnete Magistrat) within Pozsony County, also being the seat of the Trnava rural district.

Slovak national foundations, like Matica slovenská were suppressed or banned in Kingdom of Hungary as a result of the Magyarization policy. In that time of national and linguistic oppression of Slovaks, the St. Adalbert Association (Spolok sv. Vojtecha) was founded in Trnava in 1870. Initially being tasked with publishing of catholic literature, the association with its headquarters in Trnava had been working as the foremost Slovak language institution until Dissolution of Austria-Hungary in 1918.

In the 19th but mainly in the early 20th century, the town grew behind its city walls, and a part of the wall was demolished in the 19th century, but most of it is still well-preserved.

In 1873 a reconstructed railway route from Bratislava to Trnava, trafficking with steam engines, instead of previous horse-drawn, had been handed over to use. First steam train reached at Trnava railway station on May 1, 1873.

The renewed connection launched a modernization of the town, which started with the erection of a big sugar factory, a malt-house, and the Coburgh's factory (later referred to as Trnavské automobilové závody, i.e., "Trnava Car Factory").

=== After 1918 ===
After the creation of Czechoslovakia in 1918, Trnava was one of the most industrialized towns of the country. During World War II, Trnava was occupied on 1 April 1945 by troops of the Soviet 2nd Ukrainian Front.

In 1977, by a decision of Pope Paul VI, Trnava became the see of a separate Slovak archbishopric (although the seat moved to Bratislava in 2008, the city still remains a seat of its own archbishopric). With the establishment of this archbishopric, Slovakia became independent of Hungary also in terms of church administration for the first time in centuries.

After the establishment of Slovakia (1993), Trnava became the capital of the newly created Trnava Region in 1996.

== Geography ==
The municipality lies at an altitude of 144 metres (472 ft) and covers an area of 71.53 km^{2} (27.62 sq mi) (2025). It is located in the Danubian Lowland on the Trnávka river, around 45 kilometres (28 mi) north-east of Bratislava, 50 kilometres (31 mi) west of Nitra and around 70 kilometres (43 mi) from the Czech border. The closest mountain ranges are the Little Carpathians to the west and the Považský Inovec to the north-east of the city.

=== Climate ===
Trnava lies in the north temperate zone and has a continental climate with four distinct seasons. It is characterized by a significant variation between warm summers and cold winters.

Climate data for Trnava (observed at Piešťany)
Month	Jan	Feb	Mar	Apr	May	Jun	Jul	Aug	Sep	Oct	Nov	Dec	Year
Mean daily maximum °C (°F)	2 (35)	4 (40)	10 (49)	16 (60)	21 (70)	24 (75)	26 (79)	26 (79)	21 (70)	15 (59)	7 (45)	3 (37)	15 (58)
Mean daily minimum °C (°F)	−4 (25)	−3 (26)	0 (33)	4 (40)	9 (49)	12 (54)	14 (56)	14 (57)	10 (50)	6 (43)	2 (35)	−2 (28)	5 (41)
Average precipitation mm (inches)	35.1 (1.38)	33.4 (1.31)	37.2 (1.46)	37.0 (1.46)	60.7 (2.39)	64.8 (2.55)	60.5 (2.38)	57.3 (2.26)	56.7 (2.23)	41.0 (1.61)	48.4 (1.91)	47.2 (1.86)	579.3 (22.8)
Source: MSN Weather

== Population ==
Historical population
Year	Pop.	±%
1970	41,676	—
1980	60,750	+45.8%
1991	68,737	+13.1%
2001	70,286	+2.3%
2011	66,358	−5.6%
2021	63,803	−3.9%
Source: Censuses

Population statistic (10 years)
Year	1995	2005	2015	2025
Count	70,191	68,828	65,596	63,184
Difference		−1.94%	−4.69%	−3.67%

Population statistic
Year	2024	2025
Count	63,180	63,184
Difference		+0.00%

It has a population of 63,184 people (31 December 2025).

=== Ethnicity ===
Census 2021 (1+%)
Ethnicity	Number	Fraction
Slovak	57,982	90.87%
Not found out	4994	7.82%
Total	63,803	

In year 2021 was 63,803 people by ethnicity 57,982 as Slovak, 4994 as Not found out, 485 as Czech, 336 as Other, 252 as Romani, 245 as Hungarian, 122 as Russian, 93 as Rusyn, 88 as Serbian, 84 as German, 81 as Ukrainian, 62 as Polish, 39 as Croatian, 36 as Vietnamese, 26 as Moravian, 26 as French, 25 as Chinese, 24 as Romanian, 23 as Italian, 20 as Austrian, 19 as Bulgarian, 17 as English, 14 as Jewish, 14 as Korean, 7 as Irish, 7 as Greek, 7 as Albanian, 4 as Turkish, 4 as Silesian and 2 as Canadian.

Note on population: The difference values of population numbers in the table "Population statistic" and in the sections "Ethnicity" & "Religion" is caused by the use of various statistical methods.

==== Jews in Trnava ====
Jews arrived into the area in the 11th century. A presence in Trnava is documented from the 14th century. In 1494, 14 Jews were brought to death by burning following a blood libel. A 1503 account of the 1494 ritual murder trial introduces for the first time in history the notion that Jews as a collectivity were of feminine gender and had monthly bleedings, a libel which would become part of the repertoire of Christian antisemitism from then on. After another blood libel, the Jews were expelled from the city in 1539 and were not allowed to even transit through the city until 1717. By the second half of the nineteenth century, the community had been reestablished, and by 1930, the city had a Jewish population of 2,728. During the Holocaust, 82% of the Jews were sent to extermination camps in 1942.

=== Religion ===
Census 2021 (1+%)
Religion	Number	Fraction
Roman Catholic Church	34,926	54.74%
None	19,336	30.31%
Not found out	6060	9.5%
Evangelical Church	1456	2.28%
Total	63,803	

In year 2021 was 63,803 people by religion 34,926 from Roman Catholic Church, 19,336 from None, 6060 from Not found out, 1456 from Evangelical Church, 389 from Greek Catholic Church, 261 from Other, 231 from Ad hoc movements, 194 from Christian Congregations in Slovakia, 148 from Eastern Orthodox Church, 125 from Buddhism, 120 from Other and not ascertained christian church, 80 from Jehovah's Witnesses, 76 from Calvinist Church, 76 from Paganism and natural spirituality, 66 from Islam, 51 from United Methodist Church, 45 from Church of the Brethren, 38 from Seventh-day Adventist Church, 27 from Old Catholic Church, 24 from Jewish community, 22 from Hinduism, 21 from Apostolic Church, 12 from Bahá'i Community, 11 from Czechoslovak Hussite Church, 7 from Baptists Church and 1 from Church of Jesus Christ of Latter-day Saints.

=== Historic ===
The rise of Trnava is closely related to the "Latin Guests", newcomers speaking a Romance language, probably arriving from present-day Belgium (Walloons). In 1238, the expansion of the town was supported by the decree about a free movement to Trnava. In the Middle Ages, "German Guests" played a major role in the social composition of the town, and they also dominated in trade and town administration. The decline of the German population and a permanent change of the ethnic composition dates back to the occupation of the town by the Hussite army (1432–1435). Nevertheless, the Slovaks have intensively tried to achieve representation in the town council. Repeated conflicts between Germans and Slovaks were resolved in 1486 by the king Matthias Corvinus. The medieval Hungarian population increased after the Battle of Mohács of 1526 and the subsequent dissolution of the Hungarian kingdom, which was split into three parts. The ethnic new tensions had to be resolved again by the king. The Hungarians were made equal to the Slovaks and the Germans by Ferdinand I, who also ordered parity representation of all three nationalities in the administration (4 April 1551). The estimated size of the population in the 16th century was 2,000-3,000 citizens. At the end of the Middle Ages, the town was inhabited by approximately 5,000 people, including those living in the suburbs behind the city walls. A presence of the Jewish community is well documented from the 14th century.

=== Early Modern censuses ===
According to the 1857 census: 7,741 inhabitants.

According to the 1890 census: 11,500 inhabitants.

According to the 1910 census: 15,163 inhabitants, of which 7,525 men, 7,638 women

According to the 1919 census: 15,599 inhabitants, of which 7,886 men, 7,713 women

=== Age ===
In 31 December 2015:

- Pre-productive Age: 9,947
- Productive Age: 46,742
- Post-productive Age: 11,603

== Municipal government ==
The current municipal government structure has been in place since 1990, and is composed of a mayor (primátor) and of a city council (Mestské zastupiteľstvo), which in turn leads a city board (Mestská rada) and city commissions (Komisie mestského zastupiteľstva). The mayor is the city's top executive officer, elected for a four-year term; the current mayor is Peter Brocka, who is serving his first term and was inaugurated to function on 12 December 2014. The city council is the highest legislative body of the city, represented by 31 councillors, elected to a concurrent term with the mayor's. Since 2002, Trnava has been divided into six urban districts, with area and further sub-units in parentheses:

- Trnava-centre (2.15 km^{2}; Staré mesto [Old Town], Špiglsál)
- Trnava-west (20.60 km^{2}; Prednádražie)
- Trnava-south (8.03 km^{2}; Tulipán, Linčianska)
- Trnava-east (10.66 km^{2}; Hlboká, Vozovka)
- Trnava-north (22.33 km^{2}; Kopánka, Zátvor, Vodáreň)
- Modranka (7.76 km^{2})

However, compared to the present-day total area of 71.53 km^{2}, the city used to have a larger area. Its height was in the 1970s, when it annexed villages of Modranka, Biely Kostol and Hrnčiarovce nad Parnou, reaching an area of almost 90 km^{2}. The latter two separated in 1993 and 1994, respectively.

== Main sights ==
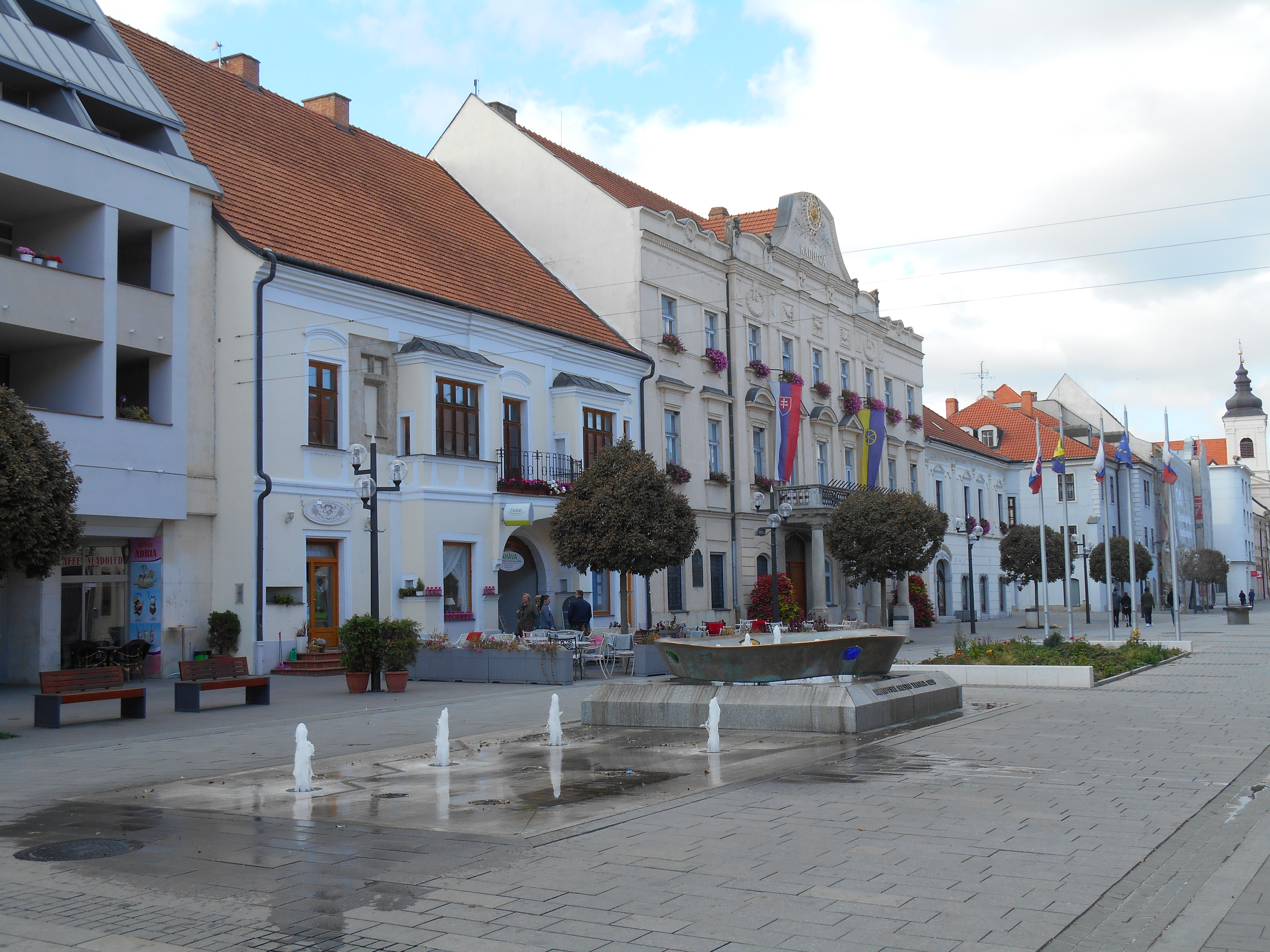
Town Hall

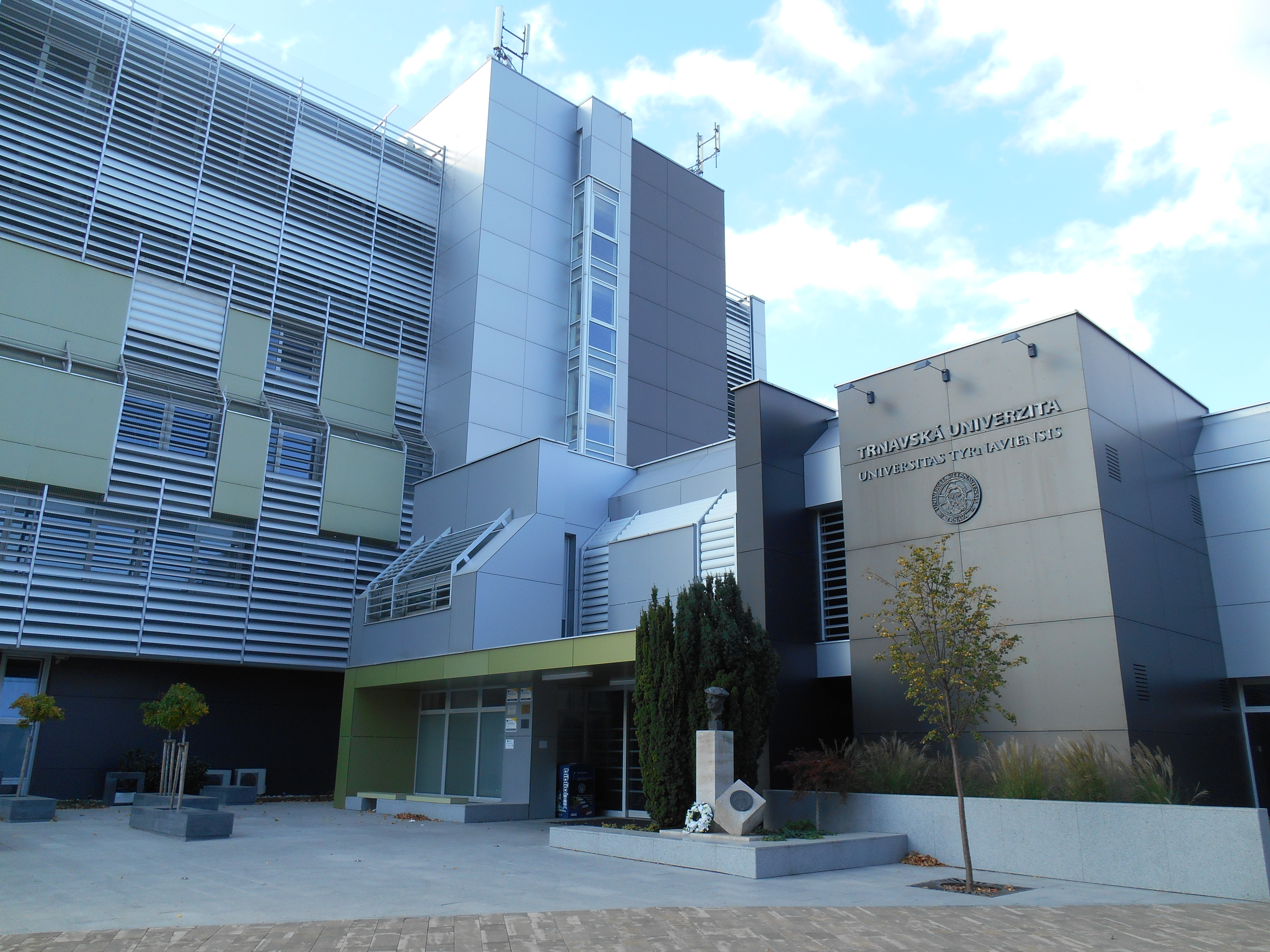
University of Trnava

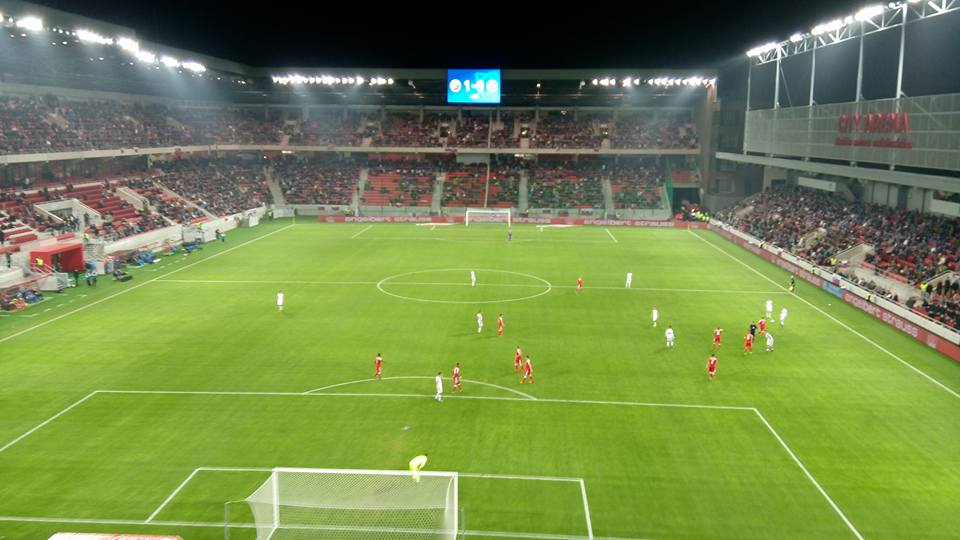
Anton Malatinský Stadium

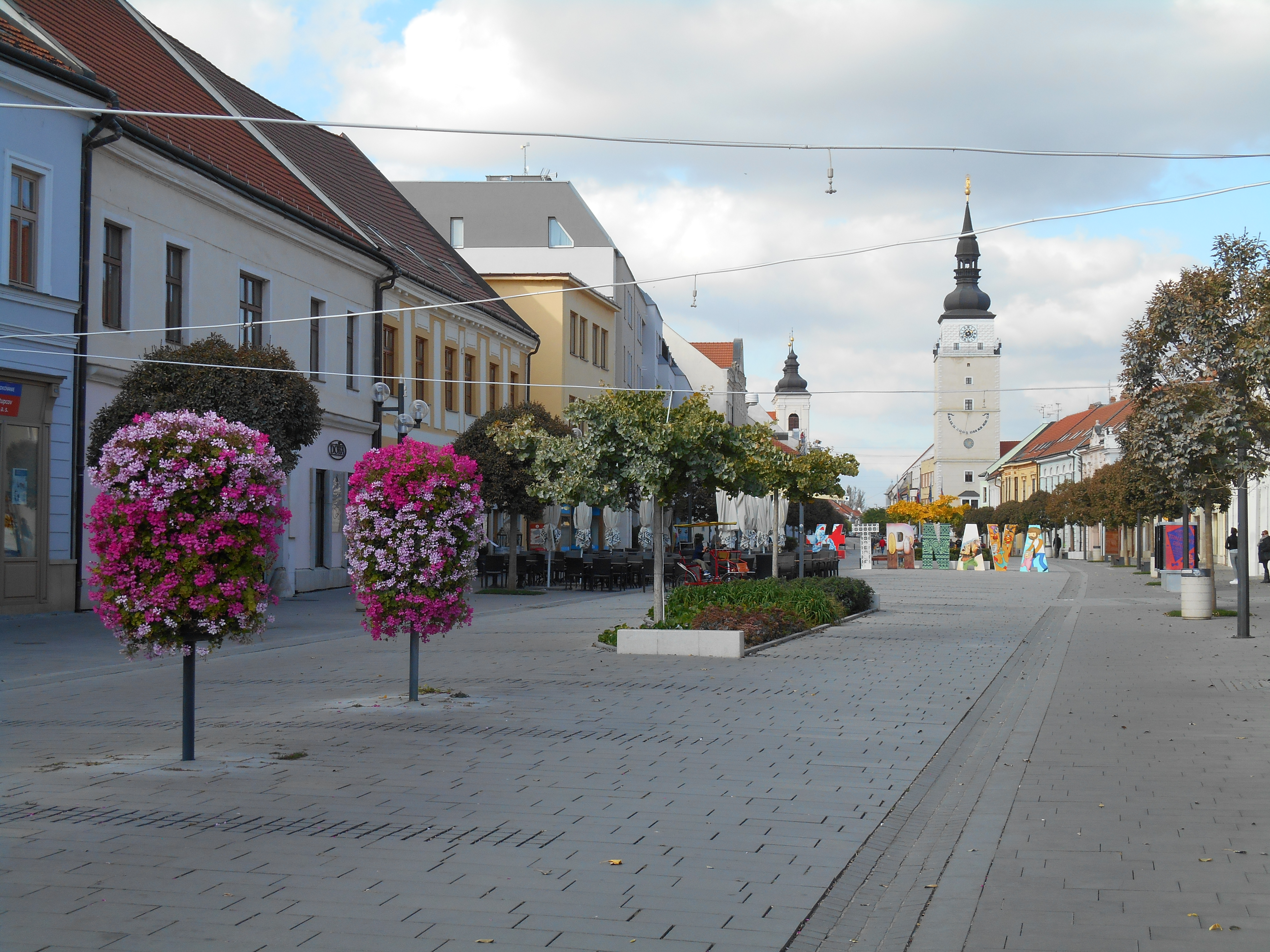
Pedestrian zone

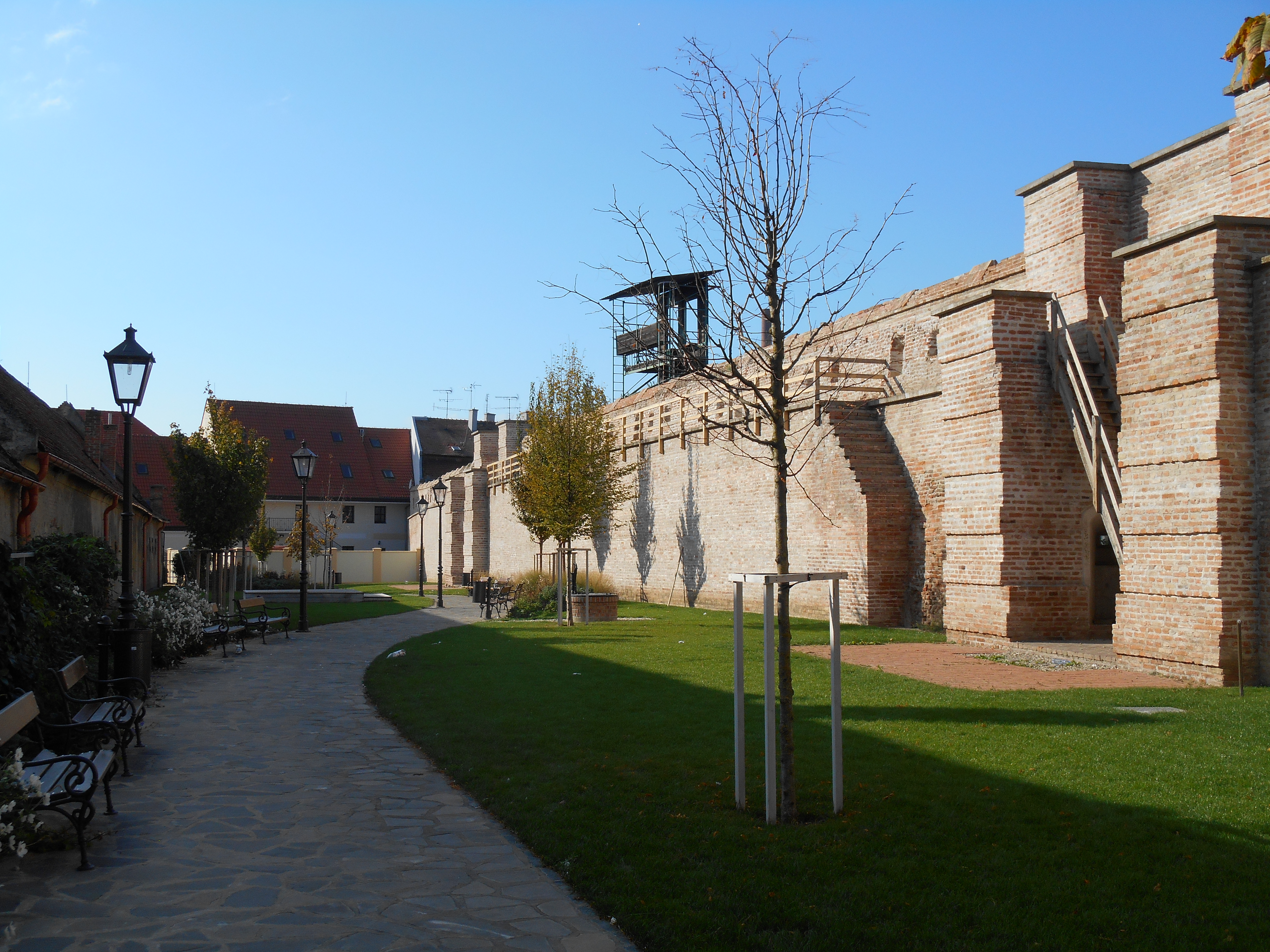
Park of Belo IV

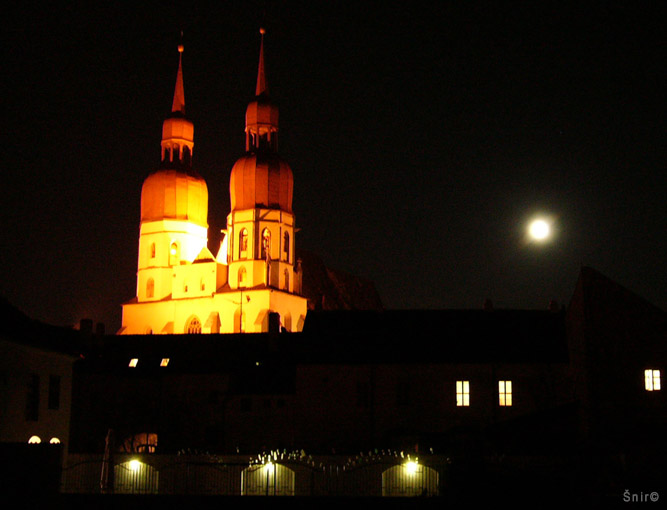
Gothic church of St.Nicolas

As early as in the Middle Ages, Trnava was an important centre of Gothic religious and lay architecture – St. Nicolas's Church, St. Helen's Church, and several church monastery complexes (Clarist, Franciscan and Dominican) were built in this period.

The Renaissance (16th century) added a town tower to Trnava's silhouette. Nicolas Oláh ordered the erection of the Seminary and the Archbishop's Palace. Péter Bornemisza and Huszár Gál, the leading personalities of the Reformation in the Kingdom of Hungary, were active in Trnava for a short time. The town ramparts were rebuilt to a Renaissance fortification as a reaction to the approaching Turkish danger from the south.

The 17th century was characterized by the construction of the Paulinian Church that bears badges of Silesian Renaissance. Trnava was gradually redesigned to Baroque. The erection of the St. John the Baptist Church and the university campus launched a building rush that continued with the reconstruction of the Franciscan and Clarist complexes. Builders and artists called to build the university also participated in improvements of the burgher architecture. The Holy Trinity Statue and the group of statues of Saint Joseph, the Ursulinian and Trinitarian Church and Monastery are of recent construction.

The District Hospital was built in 1824. The building of the theatre started in May 1831, and the first performance was played at Christmas. Both of the Trnava synagogues, historical structures with oriental motifs, date back to the 19th century. The Synagogue Status Quo Ante currently houses the Jána Koniareka art gallery.

=== Controversies ===
Renovated in 2010, the 19th-century Orthodox Synagogue, which was falling into disrepair, was turned into a chic, modern cafe named Synagoga Cafe in 2016.

Critics view the business as an example of exploitative cultural appropriation in the wake of the Holocaust, where the former occupants were sent to concentration camps. Whereas, advocates argue that it reflects respect and nostalgia for Jews in addition to providing a vehicle for at least some preservation of the heritage site.

== Culture ==
=== Cultural depictions ===
- In literature

Humanist scholar János Zsámboky dedicated to his birthplace Latin language poem Tirnaviae patriae meae arma, published in his 1564's Emblemata.

In his 1938's adventurous novel Trnava, ruža krvavá (Trnava The Bloody Rose) Slovak historical fiction author Jožo Nižnánsky depicted the atmosphere of Trnava in time of Rákóczi's War of Independence.

Juraj Červenák set his historical mystery novel Lovec čertov (The Devil Hunter) in Trnava and its surroundings.

- In cinema

Posledná bosorka (The Last Witch), a 1957 Slovak film's plot is set in Trnava of the 18th century.

=== Theatre ===
- Divadlo Jána Palárika (Ján Palárik Theatre) is a professional Slovak-language theatrical company with an established permanent scene under the auspices of Trnava region authorities.

=== Museums ===
- Galéria Jána Koniarka (Ján Koniarek Gallery)
- Západoslovenské Múzeum (West Slovak Museum/ Museum of western Slovakia) is regional museum purposed on ethnography and history with national specialization on campanology, brickworking and invertebrates, with its headquarters in former Clarist monastery.

=== Others ===
- Kultúrne centrum Malý Berlín is an independent cultural center with gastronomic establishments, coworking and public space for events as theater and dance performances, concerts, film screenings, literary parties, conferences, discussions and educational events.

== Education ==
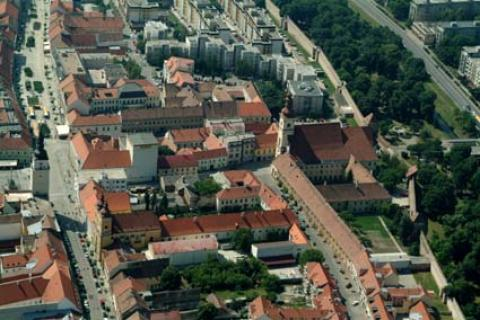
Aerial photography of Trnava

Trnava is the seat of two universities: University of Trnava (present) with 7,159 students, including 446 doctoral students. and of the University of Ss. Cyril and Methodius, with 6,833 students. The city's system of primary education consists of nine public schools and one religious primary school with a total of 5,422 pupils enrolled in 2006. Secondary education is represented by four gymnasia with 2,099 students, 7 specialized high schools with 3,212 students, and 6 vocational schools with 3,697 students.

- Materiálovotechnologická fakulta Slovenskej technickej univerzity v Bratislave so sídlom v Trnave (Faculty of Materials Science and Technology in Trnava) is a school of materials engineering. Established in 1986 as an autonomous body within the Slovak University of Technology, has nowadays institutes of materials, production technologies, industrial engineering and management, integrated safety, applied informatics, automation, mechatronics, and advanced technologies research. School possesses Centre of Excellence of 5-axis Machining and Centre of Excellence of Diagnostic Methods.

== Economy ==
=== Industry ===
Having a long industrial tradition back to the early beginnings of the 20th century, Trnava has been known country-wide for mechanical engineering ever since. Although the former socialist-era manufacturer Trnavské automobilové závody (Trnava automobile works) collapsed after Velvet Revolution, since 2003 Trnava has been noted for car-making again due newly built Stellantis Trnava Plant.

Stellantis Trnava Plant is a core industrial site in region and country as well, being third largest mechanical engineering company in Slovakia.

Important mechanical engineering plant at Trnava suburbs is subsidiary of ZF Friedrichshafen supplying systems for passenger cars, commercial vehicles and industrial technology.

Formerly a division of ZF, Boge Rubber & Plastics Group plant in Trnava is a producer of vibration control technology and lightweight components for the automotive industry.

Železničné opravovne a strojárne (ŽOS) Trnava (Railway repair shop and mechanic works) is industrial facility that performs repairs and inspections of freight cars, coaches and their subassemblies. It also manufactures new freight wagons, carries out repairs, modernisation and upgrading of rolling stock

Trnava is also home for glass fiber producing plant. Being founded in 1966, it is nowadays subsidiary of Johns Manville. As of 2021 Trnava glass-fibres plant was largest company of Slovakia's glass industry.

== Transport ==
=== Road ===
The city lies at the crossroads of two roads of international importance: from the Czech Republic to southern Slovakia and from Bratislava to northern Slovakia. The D1 motorway connects the city to Bratislava, Trenčín and Žilina and the R1 expressway connects it to Nitra. A part of a planned bypass is currently under construction.

=== Rail ===
The city also has an important station on the Bratislava–Žilina railway, with two tracks from Sereď and Kúty (near the Czech border) ending in the city.

=== Air ===
Although there is a small airstrip, Letisko Boleráz, to the north of the city, the closest international airports are in Bratislava and Vienna.

=== Local public transit ===
The city operates a public transport service with regular bus circulation, currently on 8 lines. As of 2024, Arriva is the main transport contractor.

=== Cycling ===
Trnava is one of the most bicycle-friendly cities in Slovakia, providing also municipal bicycle-sharing system.

Trnava has one of the best networks of cycling paths among towns in the country. As of 2022, in the town itself 22 km of cycling routes were in use and 25 km projected. Planned cycling infrastructure is around 120 km.

== Parks and open spaces ==
- Ružový park
- Janko Kráľ Park
- Bernolákov sad
- Park of Belo IV
- Park pri Kalvárií
- Park SNP
- Univerzitný parčík
- Recreation zone Štrky
- Trnava ponds

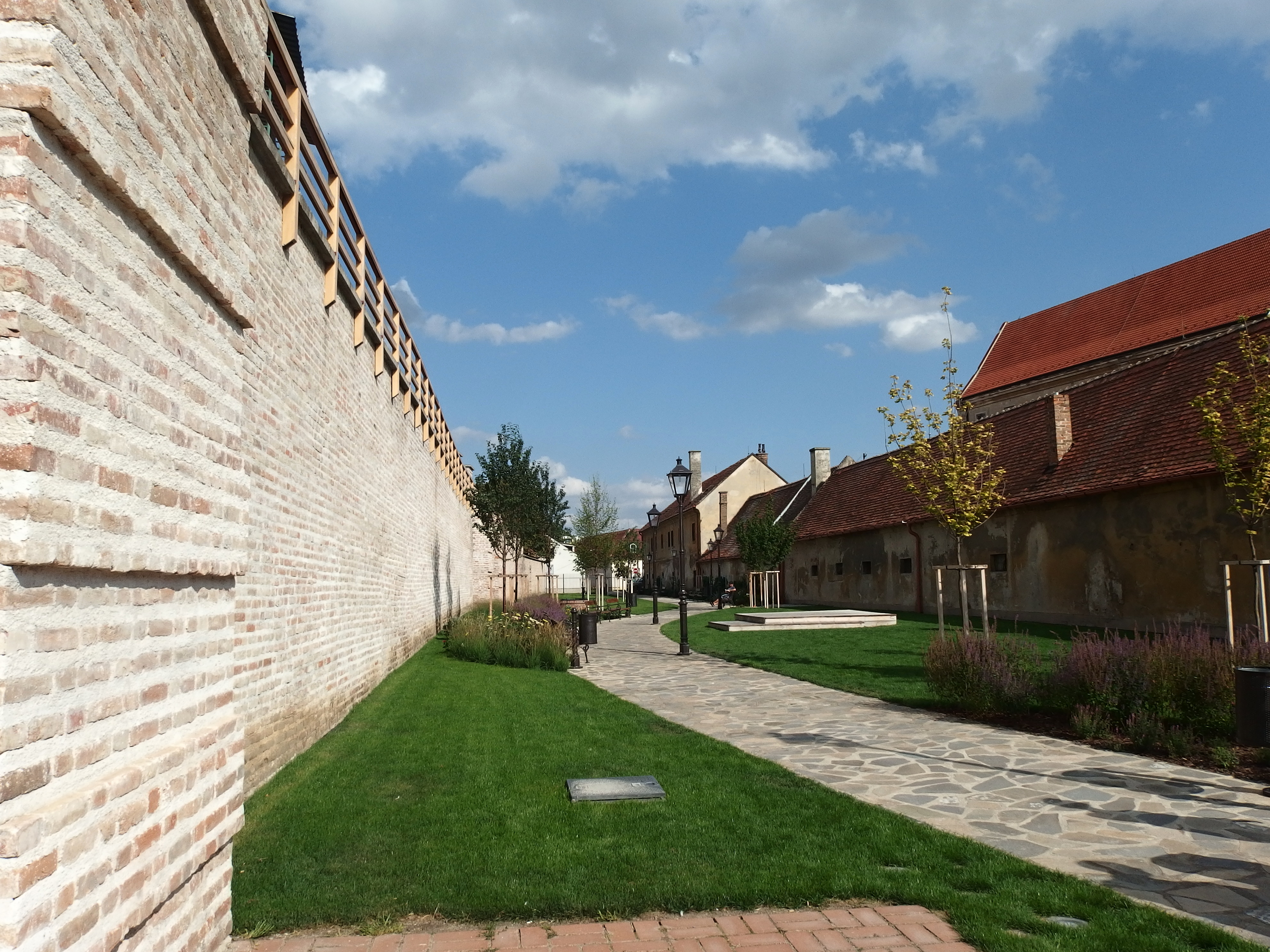
Park of Belo IV

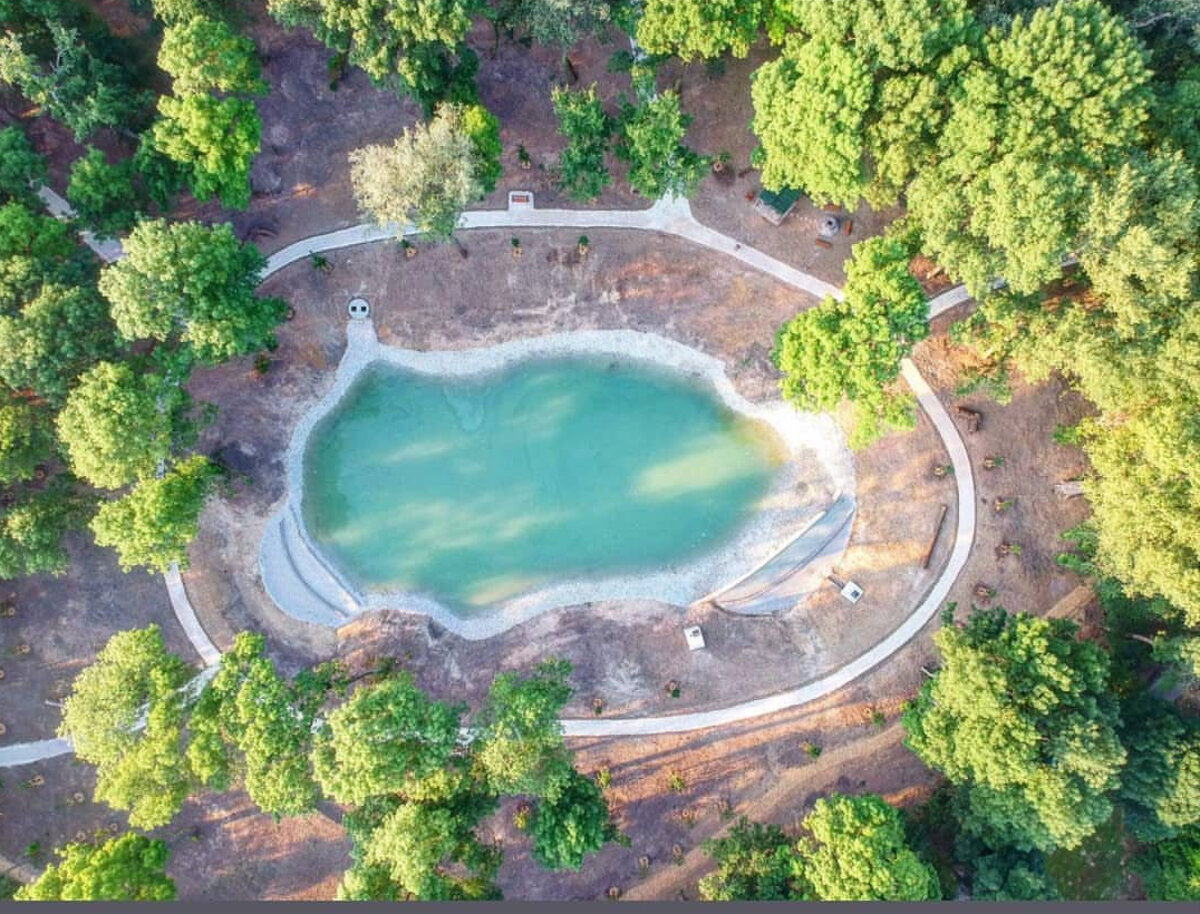
Recreation zone Štrky

== Sports ==
Trnava hosts annual tennis tournaments: the Empire Slovak Open for women since 2009 and formerly the men's STRABAG Challenger Open (2007–2016). Major sports clubs in the city include the football team FC Spartak Trnava and the ice hockey side HK Trnava.

The city also has clubs in various other sports: RC Spartak Trnava (rugby), Trnava Bulldogs (American football), BK Angels Trnava (baseball), and NK Slávia Trnava (futnet).

== Notable people ==
- Blažej Baláž (born 1958), Slovak conceptual artist
- Mária Balážová (born 1956), Slovak painter
- Juraj Beneš (1940–2004), composer
- Anton Bernolák (1762–1813), priest, writer, the author of the first Slovak language standard
- Pavol Blažek (born 1958), race walker
- Libor Charfreitag (born 1977), hammer thrower
- Karol Dobiáš (born 1947), football player
- Dominik Drdul (born 1997), politician
- Oskar Dvořák (born 1991), politician
- Vilmos Fraknói (1843–1924), Hungarian-Jewish, Roman Catholic priest, historian, secretary of HAS, titular bishop, canon of Várad
- Károly Hadaly (1743–1834), Hungarian mathematician
- Augustín Hambálek (born 1957), Slovak politician
- Gabriela Hanuláková (1957–2024), Slovak track and field athlete
- Maximilian Hell (1720–1792), Hungarian astronomer
- Jozef Heriban (born 1953), Slovak novelist and screenwriter
- Vanesa Hocková (born 2000), Slovak sport shooter
- Ányos Jedlik (1800–1895), Hungarian scientist, inventor, teacher, member of the Order of Saint Benedict
- Miroslav Karhan (born 1976), football player
- Dušan Keketi (born 1975), politician
- Zoltán Kodály (1882–1967), Hungarian composer, ethnomusicologist, music pedagogue, from 1892 to 1900 studied at the archbishopric gymnasium (grammar school) in Trnava
- Louis I of Hungary (1326–1382), King of Hungary, Croatia, and Poland, died in Trnava
- Anton Malatinský (1920–1992), Slovak/Czechoslovak football player and coach
- Tomáš Maštalír (born 1977), actor
- Igor Matovič (born 1973), politician
- Milan Mikuláš (born 1963), triple jumper
- Nicolaus Olahus (1493–1568), Hungarian archbishop
- Péter Pázmány (1570–1637), Hungarian cardinal and statesman, 1616–1637 resident archbishop in Trnava, founder of Universitas Tyrnaviensis, historical precursor of nowadays University of Trnava
- János Sajnovics (1733–1785), Hungarian astronomer and linguist
- Sima, (born 1996), singer
- Mikuláš Schneider-Trnavský (1881–1958), composer and conductor
- Marek Ujlaky (born 1974), football player
- Tomáš Valášek (born 1972), politician
- Miroslav Válek (1927–1991), modernist poet, communist politician, born in Trnava
- Martin Venhart, nuclear physicist, president of the Slovak Academy of Sciences
- Jozef Viskupič (born 1976), politician
- Rudolf Vrba (1924–2006), co-author of the Vrba–Wetzler report, professor of pharmacology at the University of British Columbia
- Alfred Wetzler (1918–1988), co-author of the Vrba–Wetzler report
- János Zsámboky (1531–1584), humanist scholar, physician, philologist, and historian, born in Trnava
- Martin Szentiványi (1633–1708), baroque scholar, 1668–1705 professor in Trnava

== Trivia ==
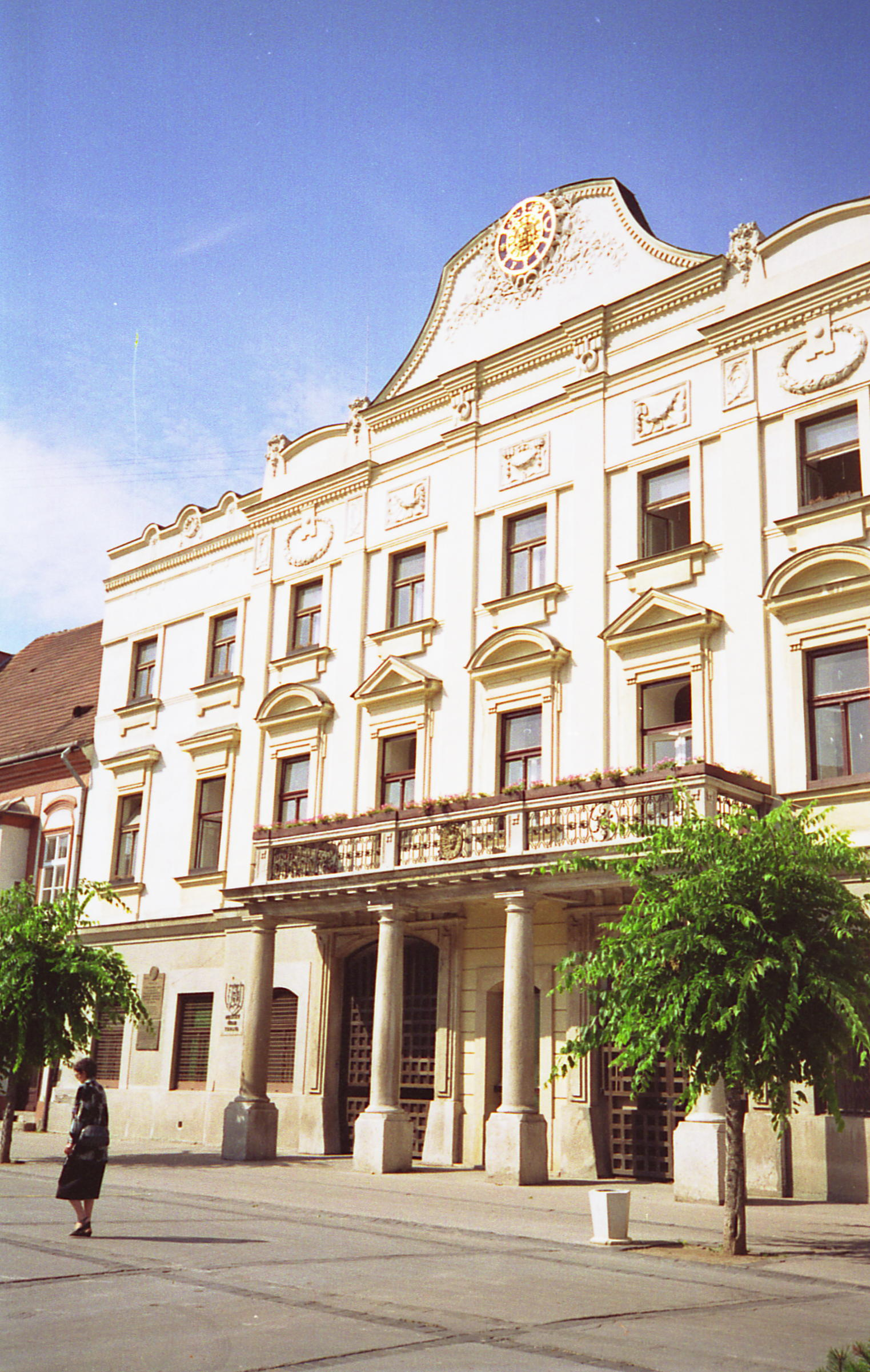
Town hall of Trnava

The first known complete translation of Bible into Slovak language, the "Camaldolese Bible" is deposited in archives of Trnava archbishopry.

== Twin towns – Sister cities ==
Trnava is twinned with:

- Balakovo, Russia
- Břeclav, Czech Republic
- Casale Monferrato, Italy
- Chomutov, Czech Republic
- Kharkiv, Ukraine
- Novo Mesto, Slovenia
- Sangerhausen, Germany
- Szombathely, Hungary
- Varaždin, Croatia
- Zabrze, Poland
