= Dominic Lam (physician) =

Chinese-born American doctor and artist

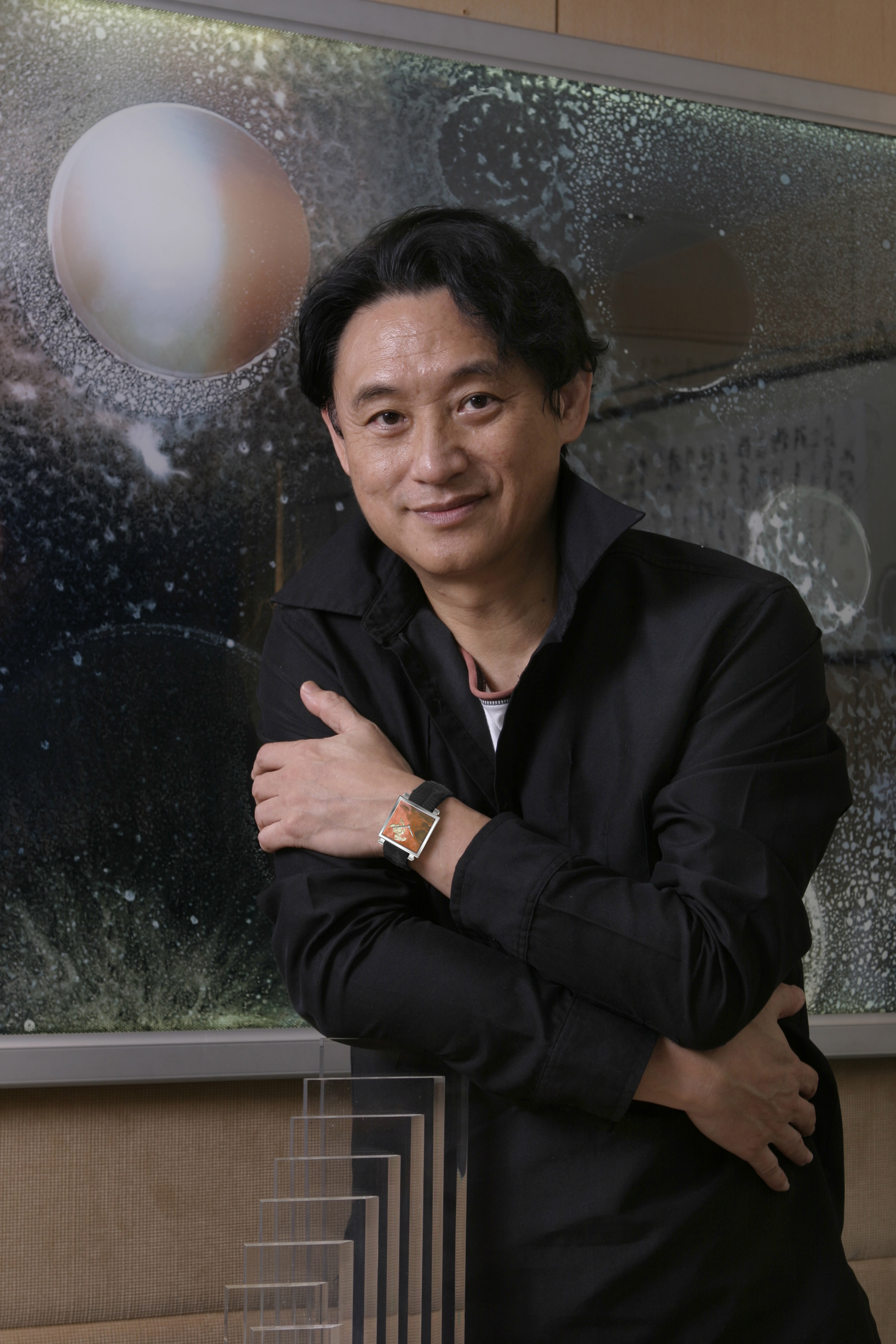
- Lam in 2006
- Born: 6 December 1947 (age 78); Swatow, China
- Education: University of Toronto (PhD)
- Occupations: Chairman and Chief Biomedical Officer of Rejuve Longevity Network
- Medical career
- Field: Biotechnology
- Institutions: Baylor College of Medicine; Hong Kong Institute of Biotechnology; World Eye Organization
- Website: dominiclam.net

Dominic Man-Kit Lam (born 6 December 1947 in Swatow, China) is a Chinese doctor and artist. Lam is most notable for inventing the painting technique called Chromoskedasic Painting.

== Early life and education ==
Lam was raised in Hong Kong and in 1965, moved to the Fort William in Ontario, Canada, and received a scholarship to attend Lakehead University. Lam received a Bachelor of Science in mathematics. Lam went on to achieve a Master of Science in physics from the University of British Columbia and later promoted to D.Phil in Medical Biophysics from the University of Toronto in 1970.

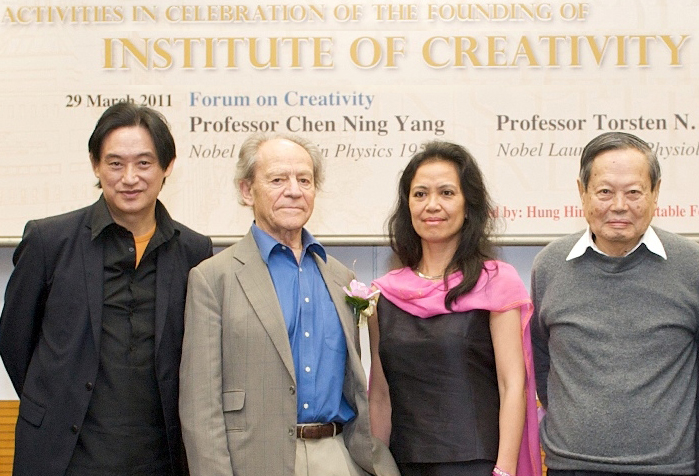
Lam Torsten Wiesel-CN Yang

== Career ==
Lam founded and directed the Hong Kong Institute of Biotechnology (HKIB).

Working alongside Charles Arntzen from 1997 to 2002 he helped develop an edible vaccine in the form of freeze-dried tomato juice that could be used to treat diarrhea in third world countries, that kills 2 million people in the world every year, most of them children.

Lam is currently the chairman and Chief Biomedical Officer of Rejuve Longevity Network (2018–present).

== Other activities ==
Lam obtained his BS in mathematics from Lakehead University in 1967, MS in Theoretical Physics from University of British Columbia in 1968, Ph.D. in Medical Biophysics from University of Toronto in 1970 and completed a post-doctoral fellowship at Harvard University in 1972 before joining the faculty at Harvard Medical School.

In 1980, Lam invented a novel painting process called the "Chromoskedasic Process", a color generating process that uses only black and white photographic paper and solutions. In 1982, Lam collaborated with Zhang Daqian, Zhao Shao'ang and Guan Shanyue on a painting entitled "Orchid, Bamboo, Plum, Ganoderme and Rock" to symbolize the unity of Chinese people worldwide. During the 1990s, based on his scientific knowledge of the eye and brain, Lam invented "Calligraphy of the Mind".

Lam created two paintings in 2002: "This Land is Our Land" (2.5 m x 9.5 m) and "A Galaxy on Earth" (8 m x 8.8 m) for the Diaoyutai State Guest House in Beijing.

Around the mid-2000s, Lam created a series of paintings to commemorate the 2008 Beijing Olympics. In particular, the painting "Olympic Spirit: Ode to Happiness" was a symbol of the 2008 Olympic Games, and "Millennium Odyssey II: From the Great Wall to River Thames – Embrace the World" was awarded a gold medal by the International Olympic Fine Art Committee and exhibited at the Barbican Centre during the 2012 London Olympic Games.

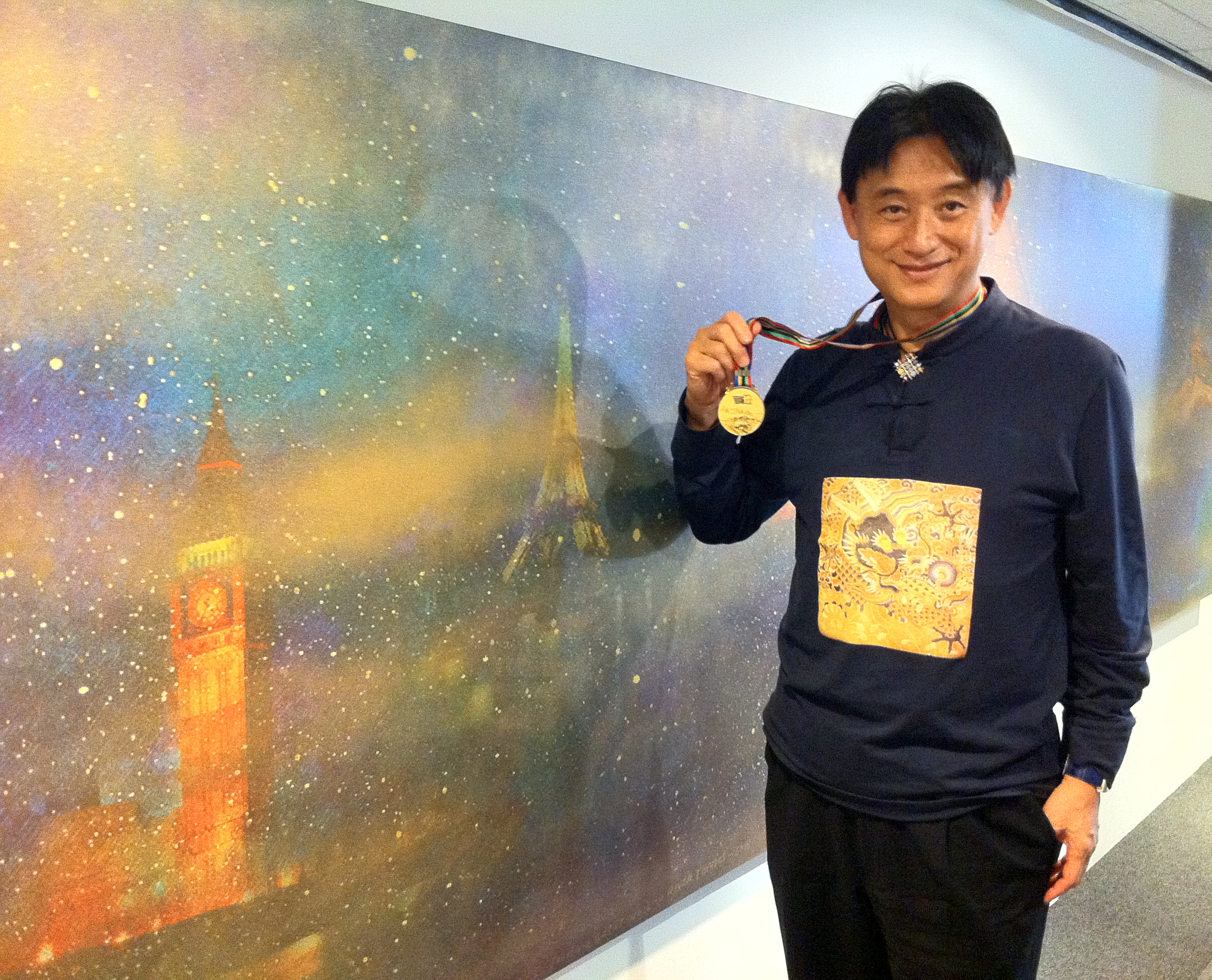
Olympic 2012

In commemoration of the 40th anniversary of the Moon landing in 2009, Lam created a 15-metre Chromoskedasic Photopainting: "Voyage of Discovery: Universe" for his solo exhibition at Louis Vuitton Maison in Hong Kong. This painting was acquired by a Foundation for US$1 million and the proceeds were donated to charity. In 2012, Lam was invited to give the closing one-man show at the Shanghai Museum of Art.

For more than a decade, Lam has worked with Chow Tai Fook, one of the world's largest jewelers, to create a line of gold-based jewelry and art: "Dominique for CTF". Works such as Iridescent Gold are designed from Lam's calligraphy and paintings. Thanks to his intervention, the prestigious watchmaker Milus was bought by Luc Tissot, legend of the world of watchmaking and entrepreneurship. For art and designs, Lam received the "Outstanding Achievement Award (2013)" and "Outstanding Product Designer Award (2014)" by the Hong Kong Art and Design Festival. In 2017, in collaboration with CTF, Lam was invited to exhibit this gold and platinum "Doves of Peace" at the Louvre where he was awarded the Prix d'honneur for Sculpture by "Societe Nationale des Beaux Arts" (National Society for the Arts, founded 1861).

Lam was invited by President George H.W. Bush to be a member of his "Presidential Committee on the Arts and Humanities", and its "Education Subcommittee" in charge of evaluating the US education system and its future strategic outlook.

== Philanthropy ==
Lam established the World Eye Organization (WEO) in 1999, offering free services for prevention and treatment of visual disorders in China.
