= Dominik Halmoši =

Czech ice hockey player

- Born: November 3, 1987 (age 37); Plzeň, Czechoslovakia
- Height: 6 ft 2 in (188 cm)
- Weight: 179 lb (81 kg; 12 st 11 lb)
- Position: Goaltender
- Caught: Right
- Played for: HC Plzeň
- NHL draft: Undrafted
- Playing career: 2007–2014

Dominik Halmoši (born 3 November 1987) is a Czech former professional ice hockey goaltender. He played two games with HC Plzeň in the Czech Extraliga during the 2010–11 season.

Halmoši played previously for HC Berounští Medvědi.
