= French Forum =

- Discipline: French literature, Francophone literature, French cinema
- Language: English, French
- Edited by: Philippe Met

Publication details
- History: 1975-present
- Publisher: University of Pennsylvania Press
- Frequency: Quarterly

Standard abbreviations
- ISO 4: Fr. Forum

Indexing
- ISSN: 0098-9355 (print); 1534-1836 (web)
- LCCN: 76640854
- OCLC no.: 715302143

Links
- Journal homepage

French Forum is a peer-reviewed academic journal. It covers research about French and Francophone literature and film. It is published by the University of Pennsylvania Press. The editor-in-chief is Philippe Met.

== Overview ==
The journal was established by Virginia and Raymond La Charité in 1975. It is produced by the French Section of the Department of Romance Languages at the University of Pennsylvania.

Articles are both in English and French. It uses The Chicago Manual of Style.
