= Dominique (name) =

- Pronunciation: /dɒmɪˈniːk/ dom-i-NEEK /ˈdɒmɪniːk/ DOM-i-neek; French: [dɔminik]
- Gender: Unisex
- Name day: August 8

Origin
- Origin: French and English via Latin
- Meaning: "of the Lord", "belonging to a lord"

Other names
- Related names: Dominic, Dominica, Dominika, Domenica

Dominique is a unisex French name of Latin origin that means "of the Lord". It originated around the early 19th century. Dominique's name day is August 8.

== Related names ==
Popularity of the name Dominique by gender.

Related names include Domaneke, Domanique, Domenica, Domeniga, Domenique, Domenico, Domonique, Dominike, Domineke, Dominga, Domingo, Domingos, Dominguinhos, Domini, Dominic, Dominica, Dominika, Dominyka, Domino, Domitia, and Domenika. Nicknames or shortened forms include Dom, Meeka, Mikki, Minnie, Nique, Mika, Nico, and Nikki.

== People ==
=== First name ===
- Dominique Baudis (1947–2014), French politician
- Dominique Blanchar (1927–2018), French actress
- Dominique Braye (born 1947), French politician
- Dominique Canty (born 1977), American basketball player
- Dominique Clifford (born 2002), American basketball player
- Dominique Crenn (born 1965), French chef
- Dominique Dafney (born 1997), American football player
- Dominique Dawes (born 1976), American gymnast
- Dominique de Ménil (1908–1997), American art collector
- Dominique de Villepin (born 1953), French politician and Prime Minister of France
- Dominique Dorsey (born 1983), Canadian football player
- Dominique Dumas, Quebec radio host and politician
- Dominique Dunne (1959–1982), American actress
- Dominique Faure (born 1959), French politician
- Dominique Fernandez (born 1929), French writer
- Dominique Guebey (born 1952), French racewalker
- Dominique Hampton (born 2000), American football player
- Dominique Harris (born 1987), American football player
- Dominique Hatfield (born 1994), American football player
- Dominique Horwitz (born 1957), German actor
- Dominique Lapierre (1931–2022), French author
- Dominique Jackson (disambiguation), several people
- Dominique Jean Larrey (1766–1842), French surgeon
- Dominique Leach, American chef
- Dominique Jones (born 1994), American rapper
- Dominique Malonga (born 1989), Congolese footballer
- Dominique Malonga (basketball) (born 2005), French basketball player
- Dominique Mamberti (born 1952), French Catholic Cardinal
- Dominique Mbonyumutwa (1921–1986), Rwandan politician and president
- Dominique Michalon (born 1978), French singer
- Dominique Moceanu (born 1981), American gymnast
- Dominique Moïsi (born 1946), French political scientist
- Dominique Monami (born 1973), Belgian tennis player
- Dominique Moore (born 1986), British actress
- Dominique Munongo (born 1961), DRC politician
- Dominique O'Rourke, Canadian politician
- Dominique Othenin-Girard (born 1958), Swiss film director
- Dominique Palmer (born 1999), British climate activist
- Dominique Pegg (born 1995), Canadian gymnast
- Dominique Pelicot (born 1952), French sexual offender
- Dominique Perrault (born 1953), French architect
- Dominique Petrie (born 2001), American ice hockey player
- Dominique Phinot (1510–1556), French composer
- Dominique Pinon (born 1955), French actor
- Dominique Potier (born 1954), French politician
- Dominique Prieur (born 1949), French military officer
- Dominique Provost-Chalkley (born 1990), British-Canadian actor
- Dominique Ratcliff (born 2001), American football player
- Dominique Reiniche (born 1955), French businesswoman
- Dominique Robinson (born 1998), American football player
- Dominique Rocheteau (born 1955), French football player
- Dominique Rodgers-Cromartie (born 1986), American football player
- Dominique Sanda (born 1954), French actress and model
- Dominique Simon (born 2000), Haitian footballer
- Dominique Sirop (born 1956), French fashion designer
- Dominique Strauss-Kahn (born 1949), French economist and politician
- Dominique Swain (born 1980), American actress
- Dominique Tipper, British actress
- Dominique Venner (1935–2013), French historian
- Dominique Voynet (born 1958), French politician
- Dominique Wilkins (born 1960), American basketball player
- Dominique Woolf (born 1978), English food writer and entrepreneur

=== Surname ===
- Andy Dominique (born 1975), American baseball player
- Jean Dominique (1930–2000), Haitian journalist
- Monica Dominique (born 1940), Swedish musician
- Ronald Dominique (born 1964), American serial killer and rapist

== Fiction ==
- Dominique Derval, fictional character in the 1965 Bond film Thunderball
- Dominique Deveraux, fictional character on the American television series Dynasty
- Dominique Francon, fictional character in the Ayn Rand novel The Fountainhead
- Dominique Weasley, fictional character in the Harry Potter series
