= Egg Buckland Keep =

Site information
- Owner: Privately owned
- Open to the public: No
- Condition: Complete

Location
- Coordinates: 50.4037°N 4.1119°W

Site history
- Built: 1863-1868
- Built by: George Baker & Company
- In use: Retail, storage and residential
- Materials: Earth; Masonry

Egg Buckland Keep is a former 19th-century fortified barracks, built as a result of the Royal Commission on National Defence of 1859. Part of an extensive scheme known as Palmerston Forts, after the prime minister who championed the scheme, it was built to defend the landward approaches to the north east of Plymouth, as an element of the plan for the defence of the Royal Naval Dockyard at Devonport. The keep was designed to house the garrison for the nearby Forder Battery, Bowden Fort and Fort Austin.

Designed by Captain (later Maj General) Edmund Frederick Du Cane, it was built by George Baker and Company and finished by the Royal Engineers. The fort was connected by a tunnel to the nearby Forder Battery. It could accommodate 230 soldiers and provided storage for both shot and shell. It was not designed to be armed, though five 7-inch Rifled Breech Loading guns were recommended in 1875, but never fitted.

It was sold by the War Office in 1947 and has been used as for retail and storage purposes. It was sold again in 2018 into new ownership.

It was Grade II listed in 1973.

== Bibliography ==
- Hogg, Ian V (1974). Coast Defences of England and Wales 1856-1956. David & Charles. ISBN 0-7153 6353-0.
- Woodward, Freddy (1996). The Historic Defences of Plymouth. Cornwall County Council. ISBN 978-1898166467.
