= Thais in the United Kingdom =

Thais in the United Kingdom คนไทยในสหราชอาณาจักร
Total population
- Ethnic Thais: 39,962 (England and Wales only, 2021); Thai-born residents: 49,711 (England and Wales only, 2021)

Regions with significant populations
- United Kingdom; In particular London, Manchester, Sussex, Sheffield, Birmingham, York, Bath, Glasgow, Edinburgh

Languages
- British English, Thai

Religion
- Buddhism

Related ethnic groups
- Thai people, Thai diaspora, Southeast Asians in the United Kingdom

Thais in the United Kingdom (also known as Thai Britons) are British citizens who trace their Thai ancestry from migrants who have migrated from Thailand or Thais residing in the United Kingdom for work or educational purposes.

== Population ==
The 2011 Census recorded 39,784 Thai-born residents in England, 1,566 residents in Wales, 2,267 in Scotland, and 469 in Northern Ireland. At the time of the 2001 UK Census, 16,257 people born in Thailand were residing in the UK.

Of the Thai-born people in the UK in 2001, 72 per cent were women (although in the British capital, this percentage was slightly lower at 68 per cent) which is considerably larger than the more or less 50/50 breakdown of males and females in the UK. The Home Office states that the overwhelming majority of new Thai immigrants to the UK became naturalised citizens through marriage, with less than one in three cases occurring through residence. Between 2003 and 2006, 64 per cent of all settlement grants to Thai immigrants were given to wives, 3 per cent to husbands and 14 per cent to children. This means that the Thai community in the UK is more scattered, according to where migrants' partners were already living, compared to other migrant groups whose settlement tends to follow more of a geographical pattern. Despite this, due to their large populations already, the cities of London, Sheffield, Birmingham and Glasgow are all home to significant numbers of people of Thai origin.

== Culture ==
=== Community ===
There are many Thai organisations and associations located across the United Kingdom. One of the most notable Thai British associations is Samaggi Samagom, set up in 1901 by King Rama VI of Thailand. Its main aim was to unite and reinforce harmonious relationships amongst Thai people in the United Kingdom by organising various events and activities. Over a century later, Samaggi Samagom represents close to 40,000 Thais in the UK and still arranges events that are seen as extremely important dates in the Thai British calendar.

=== Religion ===
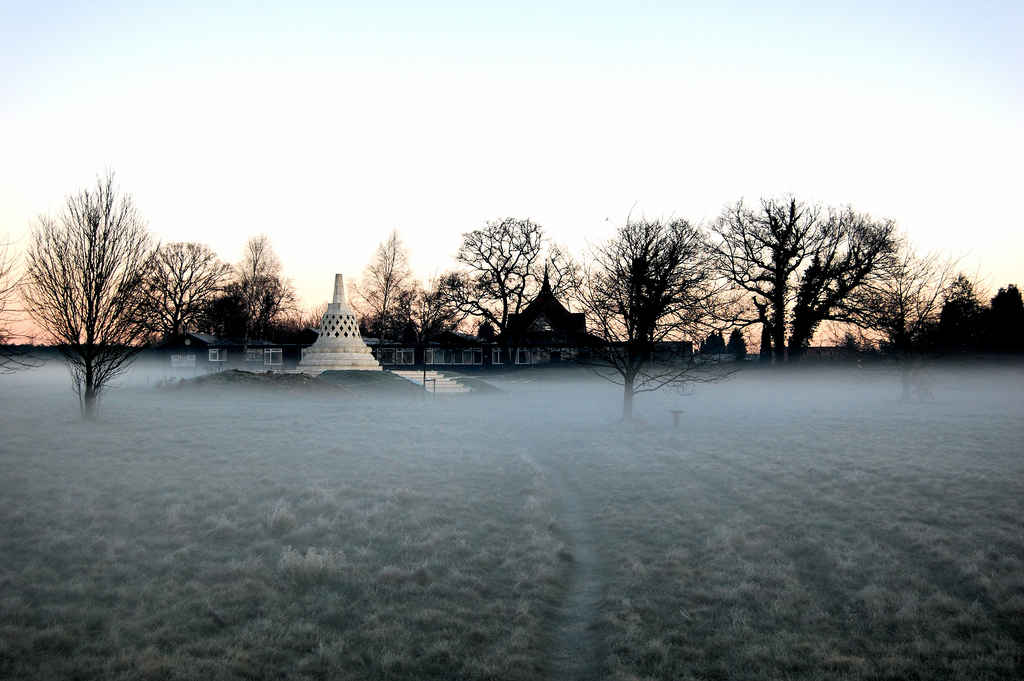
The Amaravati Thai Buddhist Monastery in Hemel Hempstead, Hertfordshire

There are a large number of Thai temples in the UK with the oldest and most famous being the Wat Buddhapadipa in Wimbledon, London, which is home to monks and nuns, but welcomes visitors of any faith to view the grounds and temple as long as they are respectful. In 2004, Wat Charoenbhavana in Manchester became the first Thai temple to be established in the region. Also Amaravati Buddhist Monastery is a monastery in the Thai Forest Tradition of the Theravada lineage of Buddhism, it can be found in Hemel Hempstead. Other examples of such Thai monasteries in the UK include Chithurst Buddhist Monastery in Chithurst, West Sussex and Aruna Ratanagiri in Northumberland. Despite not being British himself, Luang Por Chah is an important figure for the Thai Buddhist community in the UK.

Religion of Thai Born - England and Wales
Religion	Census 2021	
Religion	Number	%
Buddhism	35,205	70.8%
No Religion	7,736	15.6%
Christianity	3,409	6.9%
Islam	440	0.9%
Other Religions	106	0.2%
Hinduism	88	0.2%
Sikhism	62	0.1%
Judaism	18	0.0%
Not Stated	2,647	5.3%
Total	49,711	100%

=== Sport ===
The Samaggi Games are an annual event for Thai students in the UK, normally attracting around 1,000 participants. Normally held in February or March each year, it is one of the most popular events organised by Samaggi Samagom (the Thai Student Association in the UK). The games have always been held at a university, and include such sports as football, basketball, tennis, badminton, table tennis, squash, chairball and some traditional Thai games such as Thai chess. Notable Britons of Thai origin in general sport include the professional football players Tom Ramasut and Jamie Waite. Former Prime Minister of Thailand, Thaksin Shinawatra is known in the UK for his involvement with Manchester City Football Club, as well as his attempt to gain British citizenship. Leicester City Football Club is currently owned by Thai businessman Aiyawatt Srivaddhanaprabha who took over from his father Vichai Srivaddhanaprabha.

== Skills ==
=== Education ===
Between 2003 and 2006, over half of all Thais to enter the UK (regardless of how long they intended to stay in the country) were students. The UK is a popular destination for Thai expatriate students with the most popular subjects areas being the English language, Master's degree courses and PhD courses. Thais are a well-educated group of immigrants in the UK, and according to the 2001 Census, 39 per cent of Thai-born Londoners had higher level qualifications, compared to the city's 31 per cent average.

According to research by the Runnymede Trust, many Thai immigrants to the UK wish their children to be bilingual in Thai and English, but opportunities to learn Thai are limited. Other than private tutoring, a number of institutions across the country offer Thai language classes, including Wat Buddhapadipa, the Bournemouth Thai School, the Brasshouse Language Centre and the School of Oriental and African Studies. English language classes have proved extremely popular with first-generation Thai immigrants. Besides the nationwide Samaggi Samagom Thai students society, there are also regional Thai Student Associations.

=== Employment ===
According to the 2001 UK Census, Thai-born Londoners were most likely to be working in industries such as hotels and restaurants (40.8%, which is much, much higher than the capital's average of 4.6% of the population working in this industry), wholesale and retail (13.0%) as well as real estate and renting (11.8%). There are estimated to be almost 2,000 Thai restaurants in the UK owned primarily by Thai immigrants. Despite their success in many professions, discrimination is seen by many Thais in the UK as a reason for limiting where they are employed. Many Thai women find themselves caught up in human trafficking, with 20 out of the 33 London boroughs reporting numerous female Thai sex workers. The Home Office suggests that Thailand is one of the most likely countries of origin for women trafficked into the UK for sex work. Employment statistics for second and third generation Thai British people are not known, although it is thought they are becoming much more integrated into British society than their parents.

== Notable individuals ==
- Mark Abhisit Vejjajiva – 27th Prime Minister of Thailand, born in Newcastle upon Tyne and educated at Eton College and St John's College, Oxford and a British citizen
- Giles Ji Ungpakorn (born 1953) – Thai-British academic and political activist with both Thai and British citizenship; fled charge of Lèse majesté in Thailand.
- Alex Albon – Formula One racing driver
- Mani Xenier Bunnag (1915–1999) - social worker and teacher
- Narisa Chakrabongse – writer and activist
- Kaz Crossley – television personality
- Sinéad Harnett – singer
- Tommy Hatto – actor and model
- Hugo – musician
- Marissa King – gymnast
- Mal Nicol – television personality
- Rama VII – Seventh monarch of the Chakri dynasty, educated at Eton College and Woolwich Military Academy. Died in 1941 in the United Kingdom.
- Colin Ryan – actor
- Tayme Thapthimthong – actor
- Vanessa-Mae – violinist
- Jamie Waite – footballer
- Jude Soonsup-Bell – footballer
- Dominique Woolf – cook, food writer, and entrepreneur
- Gigguk – Anime YouTuber

== See also ==
- British East and Southeast Asian
- Thailand-United Kingdom relations
- Temples and monasteries
  - Wat Buddhapadipa
  - Wat Charoenbhavana
  - Amaravati Buddhist Monastery
  - Chithurst Buddhist Monastery
  - Aruna Ratanagiri
  - ""Wat Sanghapadipa - Wales""
- Religious movement
  - Dhammakaya Tradition UK
- Community
  - Samaggi Samagom
- Related ethnic groups
  - Thai American
  - Thai Canadian
  - Thai people
