= Domino Records =

Domino Records may refer to:

- Domino Records (1916), American producer of early phonograph, from 1916 to 1917
- Domino Records (1924), American record label, from 1924 to 1933
- Domino Records (1957), American regional record label from Austin, Texas, from 1957 to 1961
- Domino Recording Company, British independent record label formed in 1993
