= Domino (disambiguation) =

A domino is a tile used in a family of games called dominoes.

Domino(es) may also refer to:

== Places ==
- Domino, Texas, town in Cass County
- Domino, Newfoundland and Labrador, a community on the Island of Ponds

== People ==
- Dominó, Brazilian boy band
- Domino (producer) (born 1970), producer and member of the band Hieroglyphics
- Cliff Compton, professional wrestler better known as his ring name of “Domino”
- Domino (artist), pen name of erotic artist Donald Merrick (1929–1990)
- Domino (rapper) (born 1972), American rapper
- Domino, stage name of Alessandra Mirka Gatti (born 1969), Italian Eurobeat singer
- Domino, former stage name of Sofia Coppola (born 1971), film director and actor
- Anna Domino, folk singer-songwriter
- Fats Domino (1928–2017), R&B singer and songwriter
- Domino Harvey (1969–2005), bounty hunter, model, and daughter of actor Laurence Harvey
- Domino Kirke, English-American singer

== Animals ==
- Domino (horse) (1891–1897), American thoroughbred racehorse
- Domino or Threespot dascyllus, a marine fish

== Art, entertainment, and media ==
=== Fictional entities ===
- Domino (character), a Marvel Comics character in X-Force
- Domino, a Dalmatian puppy with black ears with rows of white spots in 102 Dalmatians
- Domino, a vehicle that is part of Team Knight Rider (voiced by Nia Vardalos)
- Domino Vitali, character in the James Bond novel Thunderball

=== Film and television ===
- Domino (1943 film), a French film starring Fernand Gravey and Simone Renant
- Domino (1988 film), an Italian film starring Brigitte Nielsen
- Domino (2005 film), an American action film starring Keira Knightley based on the life of Domino Harvey
- Domino (2019 film), an American crime thriller film directed by Brian De Palma and starring Nikolaj Coster-Waldau, Carice van Houten and Guy Pearce
- Domino (TV series), an Armenian sitcom

=== Games and related competitions ===
- Domino (card game), a shedding game involving laying cards off against a starter card
- Domino Day, a world-record attempt for the highest number of falling dominoes
- Dominos (video game), a 1977 arcade game by Atari

=== Music ===
==== Groups ====
- Billy Ward and the Dominoes, a vocal group that included Clyde McPhatter and Jackie Wilson
- Derek and the Dominos, a band from the early 1970s featuring Eric Clapton

==== Recording companies ====
- Domino Recording Company, known as Domino, based in London
- Domino Records (1916), producer of early phonograph records
- Domino Records (1924), a dime-store label produced from 1924 to 1934
- Domino Records (1957), a record label from Austin, Texas

==== Albums ====
- Domino (Diners album), 2023
- Domino (Domino album), 1993
- Domino (Rahsaan Roland Kirk album), 1962
- Domino (Squeeze album), 1998

==== Songs ====
- "Domino" (1950 song), with music by Louis Ferrari and lyrics by Jacques Plante (French) and Don Raye (English)
- "Domino" (Genesis song), 1986
- "Domino" (Jessie J song), 2011
- "Domino" (Kiss song), 1992
- "Domino" (Saara Aalto song), 2018
- "Domino" (Van Morrison song), 1970
- "Dominoes" (Robbie Nevil song), 1986
- "Dominos" (song), by the Big Pink from A Brief History of Love, 2009
- "Domino", by !!! from Wallop, 2019
- "Domino", by 4Minute from Name Is 4Minute, 2013
- "Domino", by Itzy from Checkmate, 2022
- "Domino", by Kai from Peaches, 2021
- "Domino", by Magdalena Bay from Mercurial World, 2021
- "Domino", by Seventeen from Face the Sun, 2022
- "Domino", by Stray Kids from Noeasy, 2021
- "Domino", by Wooseok from 9801, 2019
- "Domino", by ZZ Ward, from The Storm, 2017
- "Dominoes", by Jess Wright featuring Mann, 2013
- "Dominoes", by Lorde from Solar Power, 2021
- "Dominoes", by Mumzy Stranger, 2018
- "Dominoes", by Paul McCartney from Egypt Station, 2018
- "Dominoes", by Syd Barrett from Barrett, 1970
- "Dominos", by Last Dinosaurs from Yumeno Garden, 2018
- "Dominos", by Peter Bjorn and John from Breakin' Point, 2016

=== Publications ===
- Domino (magazine), a magazine focused on shopping for the home
- Dominoes, a collection of stories by Bali Rai

== Brands and enterprises ==
- Dominó (Chile), Chilean fast-food restaurant chain
- Domino Foods, sugar-refining company founded by Henry Osborne Havemeyer
- Domino Printing Sciences, British-based developer of inkjet and laser-printing solutions
- Domino's Pizza, an international pizza restaurant chain
  - Domino's Pizza Enterprises, Australian franchise
  - Domino's Pizza Group, United Kingdom franchise
  - Domino's Pizza Israel, Israeli franchise
- Domino (cookie), a Finnish brand of cookies similar to Oreo or Hydrox

== Computing, mathematics, and technology ==
- Domino (mathematics), the polyomino of order two
- Domino computer, a computer based on sequences of falling dominoes
- Domino logic, a logic technique used in many modern integrated circuits
- Domino Tiles, a Unicode block containing symbols for the standard six-dot domino tile set
- HCL Notes, the server element to the Notes client-server package (formerly Lotus Notes, then IBM Lotus Notes, now HCL Notes)

== Transportation ==
- Daihatsu Domino, European name for the Daihatsu Mira car
- Domino 55, Domino 67, or Domino 69, series of railway signal boxes developed by Integra Signum
- Dennis Domino, a British city bus

== Other uses ==
- Benedicamus Domino, a closing salutation used in the Roman Mass
- Home and National Rally abbr. DOMiNO, a political party in Croatia
- Domino effect
- Domino joiner, a woodworking mortise and tenon joining tool
- Domino mask, a partial mask that covers the eyes
- Domino theory, a Cold War-era political theory
- Domino toppling, the activity of triggering the first in a line of standing domino tiles to create a chain reaction
- LP Domino, a Slovak football team playing in 3. liga (Slovak Third League)
- Domino, a fictional planet from Winx Club

== See also ==
- Dominus (disambiguation)
