= Samaggi Samagom =

- สามัคคีสมาคม
- Formation: 1901
- Founder: Crown Prince Maha Vajiravudh
- Type: Student association
- Headquarters: Office of Educational Affairs, 28 Princes Gate, London SW7 1PT
- Members: 10,000 (approx.)
- President: Phurita Urusetthanon (University of Warwick)
- Vice Presidents: Pakkapol Lailert (Academic Affairs and Careers Development); Poonyawee Vatcharakomolpun (Operations); Theerat Piromsawasdi (Events and Creative Media)
- Executive Committee: Theerakarn Rawevorn Jaidee (Secretary General); Pidchada Pisolpool (Deputy Secretary General); Panod Pongpattanapun (Executive Director of Sponsorships); Pancheva Arunlerktawin (Director of Events); Phurida Panvoon (Director of Finance); Pachrapol Likasitwatanakul (Director of Academic Affairs); Thittayaprapa Milintachinda (Director of Careers Development); Phatcharaphon Ungpakornkaew (Director of Legal Affairs); Pongnate Vivatvarin (Director of Creative Media & Marketing)
- Staff: ~90 student volunteers (2025-2026)
- Website: link.samaggisamagom.com (temporary website)

Samaggi Samagom (Thai: สามัคคีสมาคม, RTGS: Samakkhi Samakhom; "Unity Association"), the Thai Association in the United Kingdom, was established in 1901 by King Rama VI of Thailand. Samaggi Samagom is Thailand's first student association under royal patronage. It adheres to its original purpose as a locus for Thai students, roughly 10,000 in the UK, to connect with one another. The Thai Embassy in London and its Office of Educational Affairs (OEA) has a large presence in the association's activities, with embassy representatives, and sometimes the ambassadors themselves, attending Samaggi Samagom events. The close working relationship is reflected in the fact that Samaggi Samagom's registered address being at the OEA.

== Samaggi Events ==
Samaggi Samagom organises many events for the Thai community in the UK, notably the Samaggi Games, Samaggi Careers Fair & Seminar and Samaggi Fest. The association's recreational events, such as its annual concert and sports day, are funded by Thai companies.

=== Samaggi Games ===
Samaggi Samagom's biggest event is the annual Samaggi Games. This is a sports day that involves several thousands of people, and is well attended by most Thai students as well as Thai expatriate workers in the UK. Sports such as Football, Basketball, Badminton, Chair Ball, and Athletics. The event sees over 800 attendees annually and is usually hosted at Crystal Palace National Sports Centre in South London.

The event used to be the main opportunity for Samaggi Samagom's sponsors to advertise their respective firms which ranges from PTT to small Thai restaurants in the UK wishing to reach a broader market. However, recently companies focus their advertisement to online channels and Samaggi Samagom's other events. Sports previously played as part of Samaggi Games which are no longer played includes: Thai Chess, Tennis, Table Tennis and Squash. E-Sports was also briefly introduced in the 2022-2023 academic year.

The 2024-2025 academic year introduced a live scoreboard where spectators and athletes are able to view scores and results of matches in real-time. The live scoreboard also allowed staff to digitally record scores of live games, feeding information into a central system.

List of Samaggi Games Dates and Locations since 2022
Year	Date	Location	Remarks
2026	7 March 2026	Crystal Palace National Sports Centre (All Other Sports)	
2026	6 March 2026	Ealing Golf Club (Golf)	First golf in Samaggi Games since COVID-19 pandemic
2025	15 February 2025	Crystal Palace National Sports Centre	
2024	17 February 2024	Crystal Palace National Sports Centre	
2023	4 March 2023	University of West London (All Other Sports)	
2023	4 March 2023	Powerleague Newham (Football)	Shuttle bus service provided between venues
2022	5 February 2022	Crystal Palace National Sports Centre	First Samaggi Games since COVID-19 pandemic

=== Samaggi Academic Conference and Careers Fair (SACC) ===
The Samaggi Academic Conference and Careers Fair (SACC), formerly known as the Samaggi Careers Fair & Seminar is Samaggi Samagom's main academic event. The Careers Fair includes booths from Thailand's leading companies and organisations which in the past have included PTT Public Company Limited, Siam Commercial Bank, Banpu, Bank of Thailand, Krungthai Bank, Advanced Info Service, Siam Cement Group and Thailand Development Research Institute. The Seminar includes talks from company representatives and Thailand's important figures including Somkiat Tangkitvanich, Parit Wacharasindhu and Jirayut Srupsrisopa (online).

The Seminar and the Careers Fair were originally separate, but have been combined since 2022 to lower venue costs. The Careers Fair & Seminar has been hosted at many venues including The Landmark London, SOAS University of London and Imperial College London. It will be held at Senate House, London for 2025.

List of Samaggi Seminar Dates and Theme since 2023
Year	Date	Seminar Theme	Venue
2026	7 February 2026	Way To Forward	King's Building, London (King's College London)
2025	1 February 2025	Reimagine.	Senate House, London
2024	20 January 2024	Back to the Future: Learning From the Past, Addressing the Present, and Embracing the Future	SOAS University of London
2023	11 February 2023	A Story of Hope and Responsibility	The Landmark London

The event was held online during the COVID-19 pandemic. Since 2023, the Careers Fair has been hosted in a hybrid format, with an online portal allowing students to apply to companies in advance. The application portal was developed in-house to reduce operating costs from licensing event software.

Seminars held by Samaggi in 2007 included the "Happiness Index", a talk by researcher Khun Nattavudh Powdthavee on the measurement of happiness; a talk by Gordon Bennett from Amnesty International on the death penalty; and a seminar on the future of Thailand's 18th constitution, which was being drafted at the time, led by Peter Leyland, a professor of public law at SOAS, University of London, and London Metropolitan University.

=== Samaggi Fest ===
Samaggi Fest is an annual concert and the second largest event for Samaggi Samagom. The event includes performances from Thai artists which are flown in from Thailand. The event sells 800+ tickets annually, since 2023 the tickets for Samaggi Fest is sold on Samaggi Samagom's in-house ticketing system Samaggi Postix. The event's major sponsor has historically been Chang (beer).

List of Samaggi Fest
Year	Date	Artists	Venue	Remarks
2026	21 February 2026	PUN (Thai musician); Musketeers (Thai band)	Scala (club)	Student bands auditioned for opening act.
2025	8 March 2025	Getsunova; Scrubb (band)	Scala (club)	Student bands auditioned for opening act. The 10th anniversary of Samaggi Fest.
2024	3 February 2024	Bowkylion; YourMOOD; The Toys (Thai musician)	O2 Forum Kentish Town	
2023	14 January 2023	MEAN (band); Rooftop (band); Slapkiss	O2 Forum Kentish Town	
2021-2022	Cancelled due to COVID-19			
2020	25 January 2020	Cocktail (band); MEAN (band); MILD (band)	O2 Forum Kentish Town	
2019	3 February 2019	Lipta (band); Mindset (band); Room39 (Thai band); URBoyTJ	O2 Forum Kentish Town	
2018	27 January 2018	Season Five (band); Tattoo Colour	O2 Forum Kentish Town	
2017	4 February 2017	MILD (band); Potato (band); Atom Chanakan; Apiwat Ueathavornsuk; Thanakrit Panichwid	O2 Forum Kentish Town	The first Samaggi Fest following its rebrand from Samaggi Concert

List of Samaggi Concert
Year	Date	Artists	Venue	Remarks
2016	30 January 2016	Apiwat Ueathavornsuk	O2 Forum Kentish Town	Branded as "Samaggi Samagom & Chang Beer present STAMP Once Upon a Time Live in London"
2015	24 January 2015	Getsunova	O2 Forum Kentish Town	Branded as "Getsunova Live in London (presented by Chang Beer & Samaggi Samagom)"
2014	8 February 2014	Lipta (band)	O2 Forum Kentish Town	Branded as "LIPTA Live in London by Chang Beer"
2013	26 January 2013	Apiwat Ueathavornsuk	O2 Forum Kentish Town	Branded as "STAMP Presented by Samaggi Samagom with Chang Beer"

=== Samaggi Clubbing Night Series ===
The Samaggi Clubbing Night Series (shortened to Samaggi Series) is a series of clubbing events hosted by Samaggi Samagom introduced in the 2024-2025 academic year as an additional source of income after Samaggi Fest struggled to bring in reliable income for the organisation.

Samaggi Clubbing Night Series
No.	Date	Event name	Venue
001	30 November 2024	Love at First Night	Fire Nightclub
002	15 February 2025	Cupid's Missed Shots	Ballie Ballerson London
003	8 March 2025	Careless ก็แล้วแต่	Sway Bar
004	4 October 2025	Welcome Party ยินดีที่ไม่รู้จัก	Ballie Ballerson London
005	8 November 2025	Ready, Set, Go!	Sway Bar
006	21 February 2026	Still Here Waiting ยังรออยู่ที่เดิม	Scala (club)
007	7 March 2026	The Last Whistle	Forge (Bank, London)

=== Other Events ===
Other Samaggi Samagom events include the Samaggi Case Competition where students compete to present solutions to a prompt by one of Samaggi Samagom's sponsors. This event is only held when a sponsor is interested in providing a case.

In the 2024-2025 academic year, Samaggi Samagom has also partnered with other organisations to co-host events, including North Games which will be held in Manchester in March 2025, and various events in partnership with Wat Buddhapadipa. The organisation is also the main sponsor of T-Stage Musical 2025 (formerly known broadly as "Thai Night") the annual Thai student musical. As part of the organisation's push for more diverse set of events, Samaggi Samagom plans to host an Art Exhibition in partnership with the Thai Society Innovation Network (TSIN) and University of the Arts London Thai Society.

=== Past Events ===
Past events no longer held regularly include the Samaggi Karaoke Night, Samaggi Bowling Competition, Samaggi Film Festival, Samaggi Abstract Competition and Samaggi Night.

== Staff & Executive Committee ==
=== President & Presidential Election ===
Each annual cycle begins with a presidential election. The election is usually held between June and September of each year, aligning with the UK academic year. Prior to the election for the 2024-2025 Presidential Election, only staffs and Thai Society presidents (acting as representatives from Thai students in each university) are eligible to vote, with 2 votes given to Thai Society presidents and current executive committees, and 1 vote for other staff. However, the 2023-2024 executive committee made a decision to open the voting to any Thai citizen in full-time education in the United Kingdom with all voters getting one vote each. However, a condition was also added that the presidential candidate must have at least one year experience in Samaggi Samagom or be supported by running-mates with combined experience of at least 3 years.

Voting is done online through Samaggi Samagom's voting system which uses block-chain like system to ensure integrity. Each vote also contains no identifiable information, though each voter is required to upload their Thai National ID/Passport and a valid proof of student status before voting opens.

=== Executive Committee ===
The Samaggi Samagom Executive Committee consists of 13 members not including the president in the 2024-2025 academic year. These members are selected by the president after the election.

The structure of the Executive Committee was changed in the 2024-2025 academic year to improve communication and efficiency. Prior to this change, the Samaggi Samagom Executive Committee would consist of the following titles:

- General Secretary (Secretarial Office)
- Assistant Secretary (Secretarial Office)
- Chief Financial Officer (Finance Team)
- Chief Information Officer (IT Team)
- Chief Legal Officer (Legal Team)
- Vice President of Academic Affairs (Academics Team)
- Vice President of Events (Events Team)
- Vice President of Marketing (Marketing Team)
- Vice President of Sponsorships & Public Relations (Sponsorships & Public Relations Team)

The new structure breaks the Academics team down to the new Academics Affairs and Careers team, with the latter focusing exclusively on the organisation's main academic event: the Careers Fair. Public Relations was also moved to the Marketing team to allow the Sponsorships team to focus on their work. The naming of the roles are also changed for consistency. In December 2024, an additional role of Chief Operating Officer was added to assist the President in overlooking the operations of the organisation as a whole. As of December 2024, organisation's Charter is currently being amended to reflect this change.

The unofficial new structure would therefore consist of:

- Vice President
- Chief Operating Officer
- Secretary General (Secretarial Office)
- Deputy Secretary General (Secretarial Office)
- Head of Academic Affairs
- Head of Careers
- Head of Events
- Head of Finance
- Head of IT
- Head of Legal
- Head of Marketing & Public Relations
- Head of Sponsorships

=== Officers and Directors ===
Officers report to the head of their respective departments or the director of their sub-team if one exists. Directors lead the sub-team responsible for a certain part of the team or usually a specific event. For example, the directors in the Events team include: Director of Clubbing Nights, Director of Samaggi Fest, Director of Samaggi Games.

There are 96 officers and directors (excluding the president, executive committees and advisors) in the 2024-2025 academic year. All staff are in full-time education with the majority pursuing an undergraduate degree. All staff (including the president, executive committee and advisors) are unpaid, instead staff are rewarded through special prices or free entry to Samaggi's events. Staff are also entitled to compensation for travel and other costs related to their work. In the 2024-2025 academic year, a new initiative was introduced organisation-wide to allocate budgets for staff bonding activities including staff trips to Oxford and staff bonding events.

== Ties with Thai Associations in Other Countries ==
=== The Thai Students Association in Europe (TSAE) ===
In November 2024, three representatives from Samaggi Samagom attended the academic conference in Toulouse to launch the Thai Students Association in Europe (TSAE) along with representatives from 11 other European countries including Austria, Belgium, Czech Republic, France, Germany, Hungary, Netherlands, Poland, Romania and Switzerland.

TSAE aims to "[Bring] Thai students together to grow, connect, and inspire across Europe". Whilst Samaggi Samagom is by far the largest member of TSAE (by budget and memberships), visa restrictions means that travels between mainland Europe and the United Kingdom is limited, limiting Samaggi Samagom's involvement in TSAE. TSAE is currently led by the president of the Thai Students Association in France (AETF).

=== The Association of Thai Students in America (ATSA) ===
In 2024, Samaggi Samagom entered into several partnerships with the Association of Thai Students in America (ATSA) beginning with ATSA's online careers fair. On the 5th of July 2025 the organisations collaborated on an in-person university expo "ATSA Expo" at the CentralWorld led by ATSA, which drew over 4,800 attendees, followed a month later on the 2nd of August by the Summer Fest at the Sphere Hall, EmSphere.

== Funding ==
Samaggi Samagom receives a majority of their funding from sponsorships by Thailand's leading companies who are mostly interested in the Careers Fair & Seminar where they recruit students from the UK. Other sources of funding come from ticket sales for events such as Samaggi Fest and recently the Samaggi Series. The organisation operates using the non-profit model and all staff members including the executive committee members are unpaid student volunteers, though they are reimbursed for travel and other costs related to their work in the organisation.

== Thai governmental oversight ==
In 2011, the Thai Embassy in London intervened to force the removal of an article from Samaggi Sara, the group's annual journal. The article was a five-page interview with Giles "Ji" Ungpakorn, a Thai academic wanted by Thai authorities for lèse majesté who now lives in exile in England. The society was threatened with losing all Thai governmental support if it did not comply. Several days before publication, the interview was removed.

Teeraporn Suwanvidhu, Samaggi President at the time, said, "I asked [the ambassador] whether he had...read the article, which I thought was balanced and not provocative at all. His reply was that it wasn't necessary, due to the...fact that Mr Giles' name is on the 'blacklist',...It's not even censorship. It's something more than that", she noted.

Samaggi Samagom in 2016 faces even more hurdles from Thailand's post-coup military government. Since the 2014 military coup no politically related academic events have been held. "We try not to hold events that are too sensitive, otherwise it will definitely not be approved [by the embassy]", then Samaggi President Thanawat Silaporn said in early-2016. In 2011, when Samaggi was forced to censor the interview with Mr Giles, Samaggi secured the majority of its funds from the private sector. In 2012, Samaggi received 20 percent of its funding from the embassy. Samaggi currently refuses to disclose the public/private funding ratio, but said the embassy and OEA has provided about £2,000 (102,700 baht) for academic events.

The Bangkok Post sums it up as, "Thai university societies in the United Kingdom built their reputations on political debate, but are now cowering under close government scrutiny."

Samaggi Samagom no longer receives funding from the Royal Thai Embassy, though the Office of Educational Affairs provides a small amount of funding for the annual Samaggi Games and the organisation still maintains good relationship with the Embassy. The organisation is no longer under the direct oversight of the Embassy.

== See also ==
- Thais in the United Kingdom
