= Forder Battery =

Artillery battery in Plymouth, England

Coordinates: 50.4045°N 4.1093°W

Site information
- Open to the public: No
- Condition: Half demolished with remainder overgrown

Location

Site history
- Built: 1863–1869
- In use: Housing
- Materials: Earth; Masonry

Forder Battery is a former 19th-century fort, built as a result of the Royal Commission on National Defence of 1859. Part of an extensive scheme known as Palmerston Forts, after the prime minister who championed the scheme, it was built to defend the landward approaches to the north east of Plymouth, as an element of the plan for the defence of the Royal Naval Dockyard at Devonport.

Designed by Captain (later Maj General) Edmund Frederick Du Cane, it was built by George Baker and Company and finished by the Royal Engineers. The fort was connected by a military road to the nearby Fort Austin and Bowden Fort, which both provided overlapping fire. It was originally designed to be armed with 16 guns. By 1893 it mounted four 64 Pounder Rifled Muzzle Loading Guns, one 7-inch Rifled Breech Loading (RBL) gun and two 32 Pounder Smooth Bore Breech Loading (SBBL) guns.

By the early 1900s the fort had become obsolete as a defensive position and was disarmed. It was subsequently disposed of by the War Office, with much of the fort being redeveloped for housing. Some of the expense magazines and gun positions survive.

== Bibliography ==
- Hogg, Ian V (1974). Coast Defences of England and Wales 1856-1956. David & Charles. ISBN 0-7153 6353-0.
- Woodward, Freddy (1996). The Historic Defences of Plymouth. Cornwall County Council. ISBN 978-1898166467.
