= Bobby Doyle (jazz vocalist) =

American R&B & jazz vocalist

- Born: Robert Glen Doyle; 14 August 1939; Houston, Texas, United States
- Died: 30 July 2006 (aged 66) Austin, Texas, United States
- Genres: Jazz, R&B, rock
- Occupation: Musician
- Instruments: Piano, bass, vocals
- Years active: 1957–2006
- Labels: Domino, Liberty, Capitol, Columbia, Back Beat, Bell, Warner Bros., CBS
- Formerly of: Slades/Spades, Bobby Doyle Three, Blood, Sweat & Tears

Robert Glen "Bobby" Doyle (August 14, 1939 – July 30, 2006) was an American singer, bassist, and pianist. He is best known for his early work with a young Kenny Rogers and for a brief stint with Blood, Sweat & Tears. He played piano on two tracks on BS&T's 1972 album New Blood.

Doyle joined the doo-wop group The Spades (later The Slades) in 1957 while still at McCallum High School in Austin. In 1960 he formed The Bobby Doyle Three with Don Russell and standup bass player Kenny Rogers, then a student at the University of Texas. Rogers soon dropped out of college to join Doyle full-time, singing high harmony and playing bass on the 1962 album In A Most Unusual Way. The group appeared at clubs across the country including the New York Playboy Club in 1962. The trio disbanded in 1965, and Rogers went on to become a country-pop sensation.

Doyle continued as a solo artist, releasing multiple singles and albums including an appearance on the soundtrack for the 1971 film Vanishing Point. In the 1980s, Doyle on piano, Rick Moses on bass and William Walton on drums, backed Brunswick recording artist Sunny Nash.

In the mid-1990s, Rogers (now a long established superstar) reunited with Doyle and Russell as part of a special concert called "Going Home" where Rogers sang a selection of his greatest hits and favorite songs. The original Bobby Doyle Trio line-up performed "It's A Good Day" with Doyle on lead vocals.

Doyle was born blind as a result of his mother contracting German measles during pregnancy. An operation in 1959 to restore his sight, paid for by his high school friends, was unsuccessful.

== Discography ==
Singles

The Spades (Don Windell Burch, John Goeke, Tommy Kaspar, Bobby Doyle (bass), Joyce Webb)

- Domino Records, Austin, Texas, 1957

OR200/OR100: "Baby"/"You Mean Everything To Me"

- Liberty Records, Hollywood, California, December 23, 1957

F-55118: "Baby"/"You Mean Everything To Me" (also released in Canada on London Liberty F-55118 (45 rpm) and LI.55118 (78 rpm))

The Slades (Don Burch, John Goeke, Tommy Kaspar, Bobby Doyle, Jimmy Davis, Joyce Webb (Liberty single only))

- Liberty Records, Hollywood, California, December, 1957 (reissue with name change to Slades)

F-55118: "Baby"/"You Mean Everything To Me"

- Domino Records, Austin, Texas

OR300/OR400: "Right Here"/"After You've Gone" (Joyce Webb with The Slades), 1957
R-500: "You Cheated"/"The Waddle", July 1958 (also released in Canada on Sparton 4-635R (45 rpm) and 636R (78 rpm)
R-800: "You Gambled"/"No Time", 1958 (also released in Canada on Reo 8316X)
R-901: "It's Better To Love"/"Just You", 1959 (promo release was R-900)
1000: "You Must Try"/"Summertime", June 1959
R-903: "I Cheated (Joyce Harris and The Slades)/"Do You Know What It's Like To Be Lonesome?" (Joyce Harris), 1961
R-906: "It's Your Turn"/"Take My Heart", 1961

Bobby Doyle and The Ideals (Bobby Doyle, Chuck Joyce, George Millard, Merle Moden, Jeff Rampy, Jerry Squyres)

- Trinity Records, Austin, Texas, 1958

AR-112: "Too Late"/"Chug-a-Lug"

Bobby Doyle Three (Bobby Doyle, Don Russell, Kenny Rogers)

- Columbia Records, New York, NY, 1963

4-42613: "Empty Pockets Filled With Love" (Kirby Stone Four with Bobby Doyle Three)/"The Eyes Of Texas" (Kirby Stone Four)

- Towne House Record Company, Houston, Texas

TH-112: "Don't Feel Rained On"/"(Just A Summer Ago) Maggie", 1964

- Warner Bros. Records, Burbank, California

WB 5462: "Don't Feel Rained On"/"(Just A Summer Ago) Maggie", August 1964

Bobby Doyle

- Back Beat Records, Houston, Texas

BB 528: "Pauline"/"Someone Else, Not Me", September 14, 1959, music by Jimmy Duncan
BB 531: "Hot Seat"/"Unloved", March, 1960, music by Jimmy Duncan

- Warner Bros. Records, Burbank, California

WB 7207: "Nobody There At All"/"So Long Good Times", June 1968
WB 7252: "River Deep – Mountain High"/"Blowin' in the Wind", December 1968
WB 7273: "I Just Can't Help Believin'"/"We're All Born Free", 1969
WB 7303: "Yesterday And You"/"I'll Be Going Back Home", 1969

- Bell Records, New York, New York

45-294 promo: "Sail Away (mono)"/"Sail Away (stereo)", November 1972
45-329 promo: "Hey Buddy (mono)"/"Hey Buddy (stereo)", March 1973

Albums

Bobby Doyle Three

- In A Most Unusual Way, Columbia Records CL-1858, New York, 1962 OCLC 11432619

1. "I Got Rhythm"
2. "People Will Say We're in Love"
3. "It's a Most Unusual Day"
4. "It's a Good Day"
5. "Fly Me to the Moon (In Other Words)"
6. "My Mammy"
7. "Come Rain or Come Shine"
8. "Old Folks"
9. "Over and Over"
10. "And the Angels Sing"
11. "In the Still of the Night"
12. "When the Feeling Hits You"

Bobby Doyle

- The Bobby Doyle Introductory Offer, Warner Bros. Records 1744, 1968 OCLC 34185563

Al Capps (arranger), Harold Battiste (arranger), Mike Post (producer); released in UK with different cover

1. "Back on The Road"
2. "Don't Look Back"
3. "Nobody There at All"
4. "Poor Boy"
5. "Just One More Time"
6. "So Much Love"
7. "Baby, I'd Be Lost"
8. "So Long Good Times"
9. "Right On Time"
10. "We're All Born Free"

- Nine Songs, Bell Records 1115, New York, 1973 OCLC 13508400

Recorded at Phillips Recording, Memphis, Tennessee; reissued on CD in 2014

1. "Touch Me"
2. "How Can a Poor Man Stand Such Times and Live?"
3. "Hey Buddy"
4. "One More River to Cross"
5. "Sail Away"
6. "Remedies"
7. "I'm Just a Country Boy"
8. "Brownsville"
9. "I Think It's Gonna Rain Today"

Appearances

Spades/Slades

- The Domino Records Story, Ace Records CDCHD 506, 1998 - "Baby", "You Mean Everything To Me", "The Waddle", "You Cheated", "Right Here", "After You've Gone", "No Time", "You Gambled", "I Cheated", "Just You", "It's Better To Love", "Summertime", "You Must Try", "It's Your Turn", "Take My Heart", plus previously unreleased tracks "So Tough", "Little Star", "I've Had It", "In The Still Of The Night", "Ling-Ting-Tong", "Gee Whiz"
- Rockin' Rollin' Vocal Groups, Volume 1, Cham 181177, 1980 - "The Waddle"
- Rock-A-Billy Boppin', White Label WLP8842, 1982 - "The Waddle"
- Give That Love To Ray Campi, Domino DLP-1001, 1987 - "You Cheated", "The Waddle", "No Time", "You Gambled"
- Fabulous Flips, Volume 3, Ace Records, 1995 - "The Waddle"

Bobby Doyle Three

- Kenny Rogers - Through The Years: A Retrospective, Capitol Records 8331832, 1999 - "Don't Feel Rained On", "Fly Me to the Moon", "My Mammy"

Bobby Doyle

- Poco, Epic Records BN 26522, 1970 - piano on unspecified tracks
- Vanishing Point soundtrack, Amos Records AAS8002, 1971 - "The Girl Done Got It Together"
- At The Rockhouse Volume 8, Eagle Records LP 318 (Germany), 1983 - "Hot Seat"
- Teenage Favorites, Anima Records, 1994 - "Hot Seat"
- Rock Pretty Baby Volume 3, Little Miss Sheena Records, 1997 - "Hot Seat"
- Rock Til You Drop!, Classics Records (Sweden), 2002 - "Chug-A-Lug"
- Hugh Hefner: Playboy, Activist and Rebel, 2009 - "Blowin' in the Wind" (recorded 1969)
- Teen Scene! Vol. 5, Buffalo Bop Records 55015 (Germany), 2009 - "Pauline"
- Back Beat Presents - Rock and Roll Party, Lesley Records, 2013 - "Pauline"
- The Texas Box - 1950s and 1960s Oddball Labels, Be! Sharp Records, 2013 - "Hot Seat", "Chug-A-Lug"

== Honors ==
- The State of Texas read and adopted Senate Resolution No. 323 during its 74th Regular Session on February 27, 1995, commending the life and career in music entertainment of Bobby Doyle. The resolution was sponsored by then State Senator Gonzalo Barrientos.
