= George Underwood =

George Underwood may refer to:

- George Allen Underwood (1793–1829), English architect
- George V. Underwood Jr. (1913–1984), U.S. Army general
- George Underwood (artist) (born 1947), English artist and musician
- George Underwood (athlete) (1884–1943), American athlete
- George Underwood, recorded by Domino Records
