= Laow Panyasiri =

Abbot of Wat Buddhapadipa since 2023

Chao Khun Laow Panyasiri
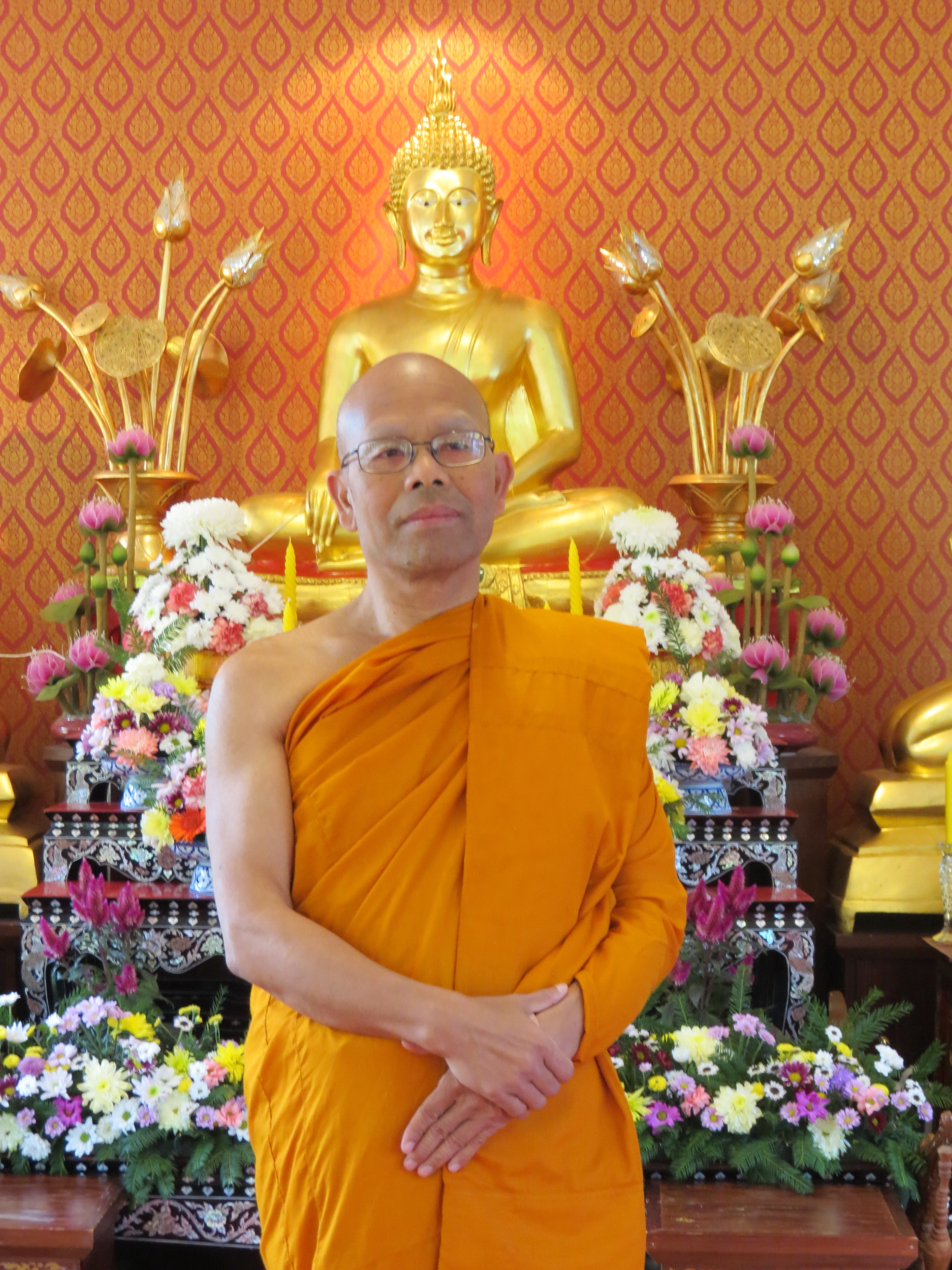

Personal life
- Born: Laow Pracharart เหลา ประชาราษฎร์ 7 August 1960 (age 65) Phayu, Sisaket, Thailand
- Education: Mahachulalongkornrajavidyalaya University (B.A., 1986); School of Oriental and African Studies (M.A., 1995); University of Birmingham (Ph.D., 2004)

Religious life
- Religion: Buddhism
- Order: Mahā Nikāya
- School: Theravāda
- Dharma names: Paññāsiri ปญฺญาสิริ
- Monastic name: Phra Ratchawithetpanyakhun พระราชวิเทศปัญญาคุณ
- Ordination: 13 July 1980, aged 19; (45 years ago); Wat Mahathat Yuwaratrangsarit

Senior posting
- Teacher: Chodok Yanasitthi; โชดก ญาณสิทฺธิ
- Present post: Abbot of Wat Buddhapadipa (since 30 January 2023)
- Previous post: Abbot of Wat Mahathat, Kings Bromley

Laow Panyasiri (born 7 August 1960) is a Thai Buddhist monk and the abbot of Wat Buddhapadipa in Wimbledon, London.

== Name ==
Laow's birth name was Laow Pracharart (Thai: เหลา ประชาราษฎร์; RTGS: Lao Pracharat). His Dhamma name, in the Pali language, is Paññāsiri (Thai: ปญฺญาสิริ; RTGS: Panyasiri), and his monastic title is Phra Ratchawithetpanyakhun (Thai: พระราชวิเทศปัญญาคุณ).

He is commonly known as Chao Khun Laow (Thai: เจ้าคุณเหลา). Chao Khun is a colloquial title for monks with the rank of Phra Rachakhana.

== Life ==
Laow was born on 7 August 1960 in Phayu, Sisaket, Thailand. He was ordained as a novice monk (sāmaṇera) at Wat Mahathat in Bangkok on 20 December 1973, at the age of 13. His higher ordination (upasampadā) took place on 13 July 1980, at the age of 19, with Chodok Yanasitthi as his preceptor (upajjhāya).

He received his doctorate from the University of Birmingham in 2004, with a thesis entitled The British Practice of Theravada Buddhism.

He has established a number of temples in Britain, including a temple at Fort Austin in Plymouth.

On 30 January 2023, the Sangha Supreme Council appointed him as the new abbot of Wat Buddhapadipa in Wimbledon, London. He had been the acting abbot since 25 November 2022.
