= Dominus =

Dominus or domini may refer to:

- Dominus (title), a title of sovereignty, clergy and other uses

== Art, entertainment, and media ==
- Dominus (band), a Danish death metal band
- Dominus (DC Comics), an alien character in DC Comics
- Dominus (Marvel Comics), an alien computer in Marvel Comics
- Dominus (video game), a 1994 DOS computer game

== People ==
- Amy Domini, American investment adviser and author
- Sergio Domini (born 1961), Italian professional football player
- Tommaso Domini (born 1989), Italian football midfielder
- Vincenzo de Domini (1816–1903), Venetian patriot and officer in the Austrian Navy
- Domini Blythe (1947–2010), British-born Canadian actress
- Domini Crosfield (1884–1963), British politician and tennis player

== Other uses ==
- Dominus Estate, a Napa Valley winery
- Dominus (gastropod), a genus of molluscs in the family Strombidae
- A THX certification level

== See also ==
- Anno Domini (disambiguation)
- AD (disambiguation)
- Domino (disambiguation)
