= Bowden Fort =

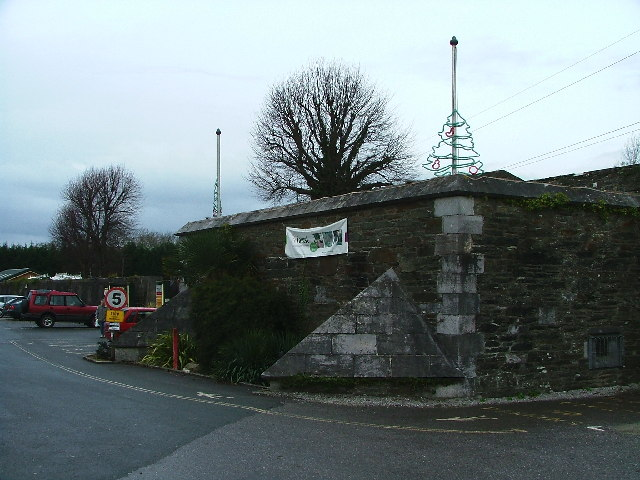
- Surrounding walls at the rear of the Fort, near to the modern garden centre entrance, taken 2005

Site information
- Open to the public: Yes
- Condition: Largely intact with some alterations

Location
- Coordinates: 50°24′22″N 4°07′00″W

Site history
- Built: 1863-1868
- In use: Garden Centre
- Materials: Earth; Masonry

Bowden Fort is a former 19th-century fort, built as a result of the Royal Commission on National Defence of 1859. Part of an extensive scheme known as Palmerston Forts, after the prime minister who championed the scheme, it was built to defend the landward approaches to the north east of Plymouth, as an element of the plan for the defence of the Royal Naval Dockyard at Devonport.

Designed by Captain (later Maj General) Edmund Frederick Du Cane, it was built by George Baker and Company and finished by the Royal Engineers. The fort was connected by a military road to the nearby Crownhill Fort and Forder Battery. It was armed with 12 guns and 3 mortars. To house part of the fort's garrison a barrack block for 12 men was built within the rear section of the fort.

By the early 1900s the fort had become obsolete as a defensive position and was disarmed. By 1960 it had been sold by the War Office to Plymouth City Council. It was Grade II listed in 1973. It is now used as a garden centre. The rear gorge has been filled in and now provides car parking.

== Bibliography ==
- Hogg, Ian V (1974). Coast Defences of England and Wales 1856-1956. David & Charles. ISBN 0-7153 6353-0.
- Woodward, Freddy (1996). The Historic Defences of Plymouth. Cornwall County Council. ISBN 978-1898166467.
