= Domonique =

Domonique is a given name. Notable people with the given name include:

- Domonique Dolton (born 1989), American boxer
- Domonique Foxworth (born 1983), American football player
- Domonique Orange (born 2004), American football player
- Domonique Simone (born 1971), African-American adult actress
- Domonique Williams (born 1994), Trinidad and Tobago sprinter

== See also ==
- Dominique (name)
