= Completo =

Hot dog variation in Chile

Chilean completo
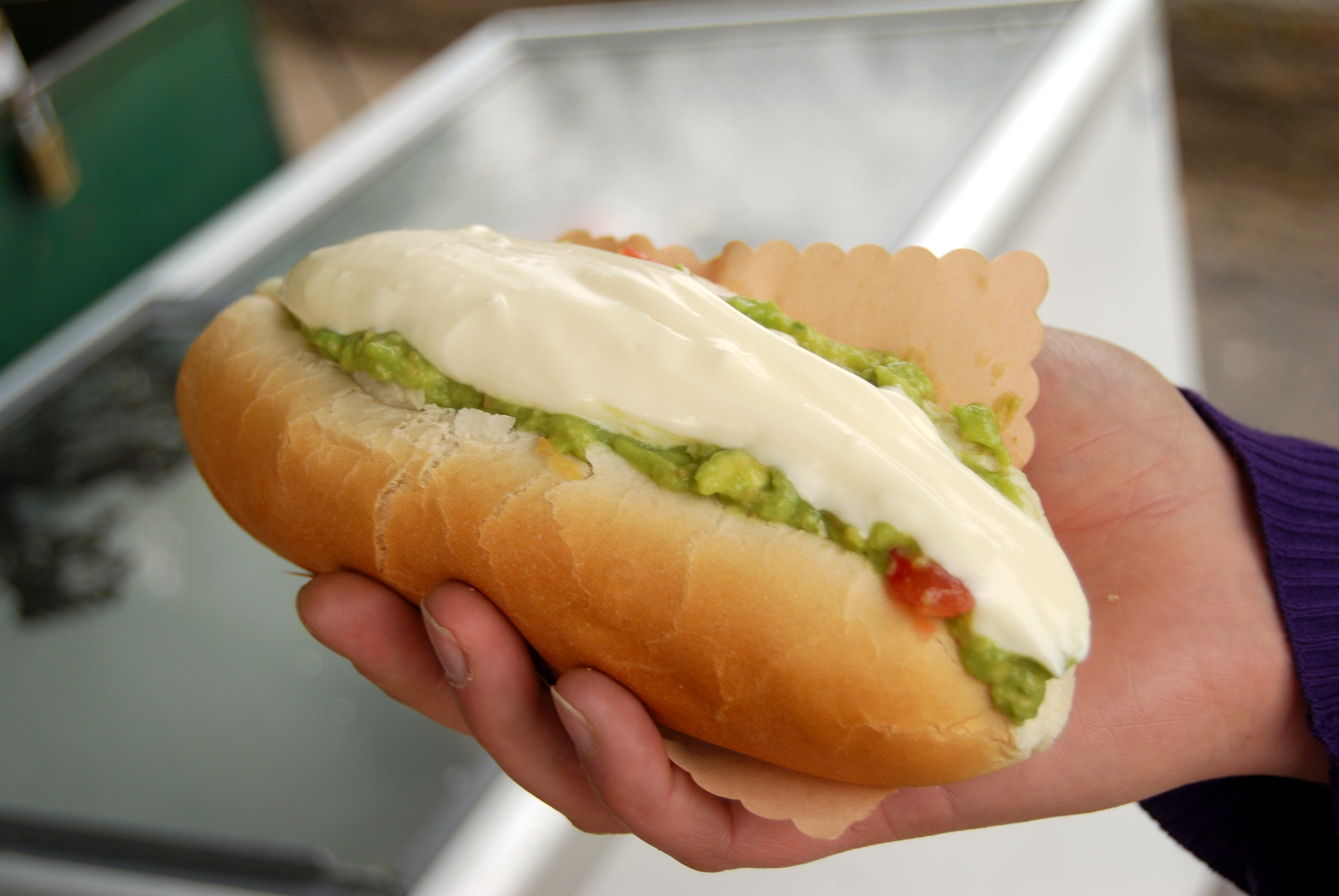
- A completo italiano
- Place of origin: Chile
- Main ingredients: Bread, hot dog, tomato, avocado, mayonnaise, sauerkraut,
- Variations: Multiple

The completo (Spanish for "complete", "total"; in the sense of "the works") is a hot dog variation eaten in Chile, usually served with ingredients such as chopped tomatoes, avocados, mayonnaise, sauerkraut, ketchup, mustard. It can be twice the size of an American hot dog.

== History ==
=== Origins ===
The dish was first made in the 1920s in the fuentes de soda (soda fountains) of central Santiago. The completo was brought to Chile by Eduardo Bahamondes who had recently travelled to the United States on business. It was there that he first saw the "hot dog" which he decided to bring back to his home country. Once back in Chile, he then opened a restaurant in Santiago's historic centre called Quick Lunch Bahamondes in the Portal Fernandez Concha where he began to introduce the Chilean people to the hot dog. As people didn't like the original preparation, he added other ingredients such as tomato and avocado, which eventually became accepted by the public.

== Recipe ==
=== Ingredients ===
Most completos contain some or all of the following ingredients:

- Avocado — Not to be confused with guacamole, traditionally only salt is added to the avocado puree before it is put on the completo.
- Tomato — Fresh tomato is a favourite in Chile. Typically tomatoes are peeled before they are diced for completos.
- Mayonnaise — Chile is the country with the third highest consumption of mayonnaise per capita on earth. It is therefore a very popular completo topping. Completo mayo in Chile is commonly homemade as this is the preferred method of preparation by Chileans.
- Sauerkraut — Known locally as chucrut, it was introduced to Chile by the large wave of German immigrants it received in the 19th century, sauerkraut is now completely accepted as being a staple food in Chilean cuisine.

=== Variations ===
Throughout Chile, specific names are used to describe the different variations of completos:

- Completo: Sometimes referred as completo-completo in order to differentiate it from the other variants, it's the most traditional version. Its ingredients include chopped tomatoes, mayonnaise (a large amount), sauerkraut and salsa americana.
- Completo Italiano or simply Italiano: topped with chopped tomatoes, mashed avocados and mayonnaise, this variation is widely viewed as the most popular. The name comes from its resemblance with the colors of the Italian flag.
- Dinámico ("Dynamic"): A mix of the aforementioned ingredients (tomatoes, avocados, mayonnaise and sauerkraut) or salsa Americana.
- Completo A lo Pobre ("Poor man's completo"): Made with fried onion, french fries and a fried egg on top of the hot dog. The "poor man's" in the name is due to the fact that the main ingredients are the same of bistec a lo pobre, a main dish historically favoured by low wage workers.
- Tomate mayo ("Tomato-mayo"): As its name suggests, it is a version with only chopped tomatoes and mayonnaise.

=== As ===
One of the main variants of the completo chileno is the so-called as or chilenito, which is prepared in a similar way to the completo, but replaces the sausage for chopped beef churrasco type or otherwise chopped chicken breast or slices of pork loin, any of the three cooked on the grill. The same ingredients used for the completos are usually added on top of the meat, also producing each of the above mentioned variants.

=== Bread ===
The bread to be used is normally hot dog bun. However, in the absence of hot dog bun, and typically in homemade preparation of completos, people may resort to marraqueta, dividing the bread lengthwise, different from the traditional cut of this bread, to improvise two hot dog buns. In some parts of the country it is also called Tortuga.

=== Similar international versions ===
The completo is also a type of hot dog eaten in Brazil, which generally includes mayonnaise, ketchup, mustard, corn, peas, tomatoes, onions, Parmesan cheese and fries. In São Paulo, it is common to add mashed potatoes. Common extra fillings include chicken, cream cheese, ground meat and olives.

== See also ==
- Barros Jarpa
- Barros Luco
- Choripán
- Chorrillana
- Dominó
- List of hot dogs
- Longaniza
- Sonoran hot dog
