= The Slades =

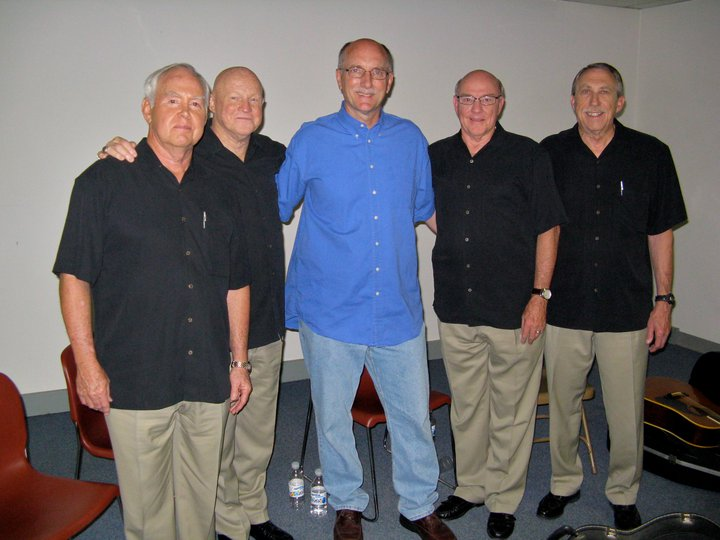
The Slades with Joe Conroy (DJ Brad) from Doowop Radio

The Slades were a vocal group out of Austin, Texas.

All the members attended local McCallum High School. Personnel included John Goeke, Don Burch, Tommy Kaspar, Bobby Doyle, and Jimmy Davis. The first four were on their initial recording with Davis joining on the second disc.

"Baby", backed with "You Mean Everything To Me", was their first record on the new Domino label from Austin. Soon after the initial pressing on Domino as the Spades, their name was changed to the Slades and the record was released on the Liberty label with national distribution.

Their second recording for Domino records was their biggest. "You Cheated" peaked at #42 in 1958 on the Billboard charts. However, when Domino passed on a national distribution deal with Dot Records, the song was soon covered by the Los Angeles-based Shields who had the bigger hit. The Slades record was still popular enough to earn them a spot on American Bandstand. Many follow up recordings and back up credits for other Domino label artists followed, but none sold as well as "You Cheated". As a small label, Domino didn't have the distribution of a larger label which contributed to the group's eventual demise.

In 1998, Ace Records released The Domino Records Story containing all of the group's output for the label, plus five previously unreleased tracks. One of the unreleased tracks, "In The Still of the Night", was included by Greil Marcus in The History of Rock 'n' Roll in Ten Songs where he describes Don Burch's lead vocal as "a once-in-a-lifetime performance".

Don Burch (born on December 23, 1938, in Georgetown, Texas) died on March 27, 2020, in Round Rock, Texas, at age 81.
