= Panya Vijinthanasarn =

Thai artist

- ปัญญา วิจินธนสาร
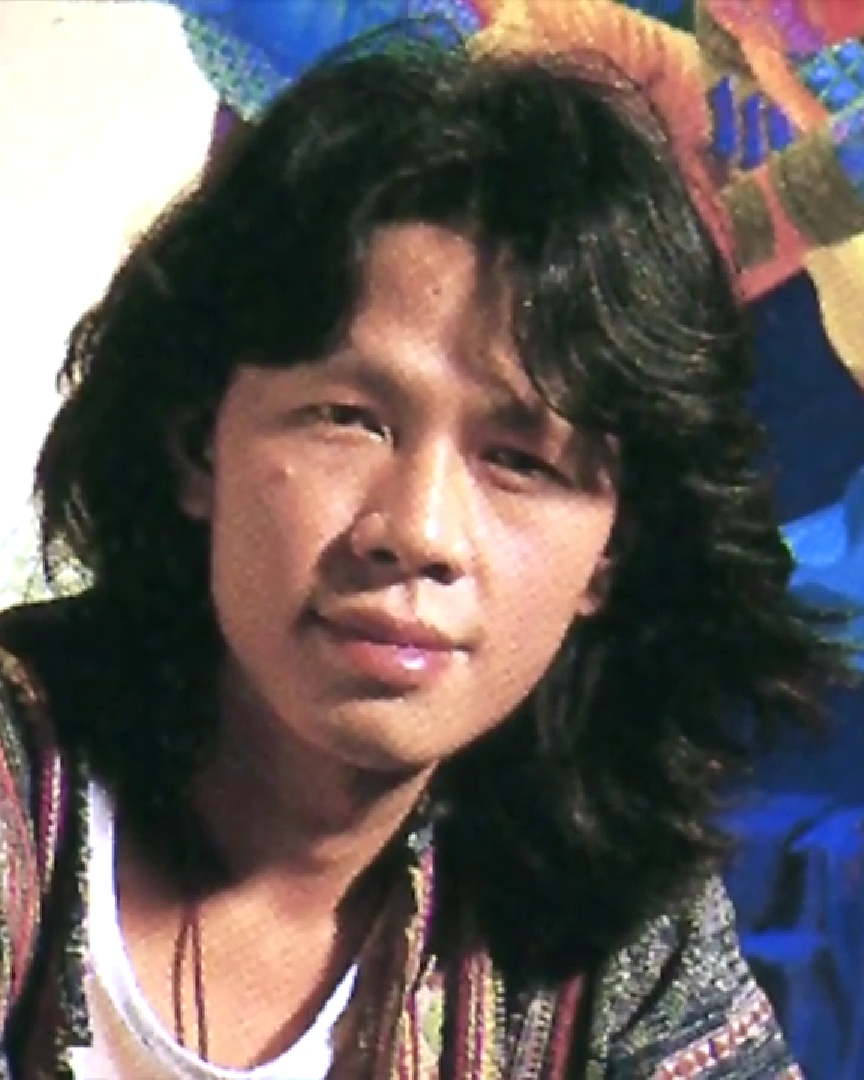
- Panya, c. the late 1980s
- Born: 24 June 1956 (age 70); Prachuap Khiri Khan, Thailand
- Education: Silpakorn University; Slade School of Fine Art
- Awards: National Artist (2014)

Panya Vijinthanasarn (Thai: ปัญญา วิจินธนสาร; RTGS: Panya Wichinthanasan; born 24 June 1956) is a Thai artist.

He is one of the artists who painted the murals in the ordination hall of Wat Buddhapadipa in London.

He was awarded the title of National Artist in 2014.
