= Praves Limparangsri =

Thai architect (1930–2018)

- ประเวศ ลิมปรังษี
- Born: 17 September 1930; Nakhon Si Thammarat, Siam
- Died: 7 May 2018 (aged 87); Bangkok, Thailand
- Occupation: Architect
- Awards: National Artist (1989); Dushdi Mala Medal (2000)

Praves Limparangsri (Thai: ประเวศ ลิมปรังษี; RTGS: Prawet Limparangsi; 17 September 1930 – 7 May 2018) was a Thai architect.

He designed the ordination hall of Wat Buddhapadipa in Wimbledon, London.
