= Mani Xenier Bunnag =

English-Thai noblewoman, academic instructor, social worker and writer (1915–1999)

Khun Ying Mani Sirivarasan Order of the White Elephant
- มณี สิริวรสาร
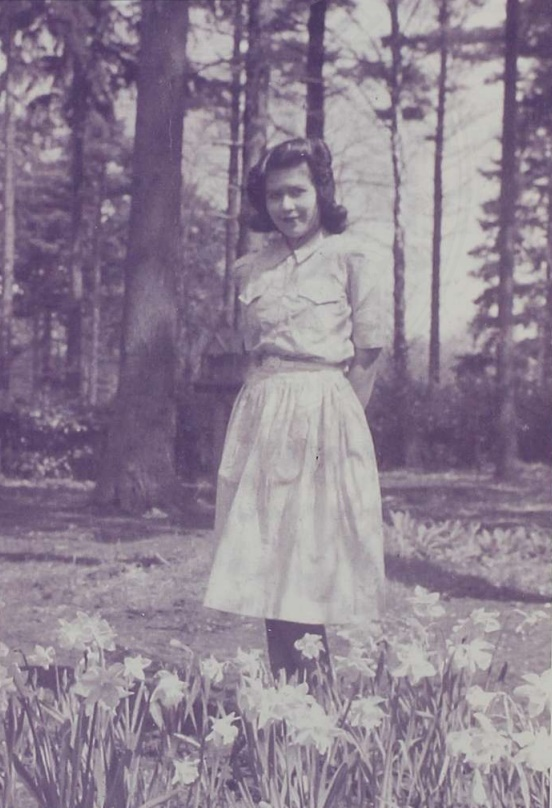
- Mani Xenier Bunnag, 1947
- Born: Mani Xenier Bunnag; September 22, 1915; Kensington, London, England
- Died: September 27, 1999 (aged 84); Bumrungrad International Hospital, Bangkok, Thailand
- Occupations: Lecturer, Social worker
- Spouses: Prince Chirasak Supraphat (1938–1942, his death); Prince Aphatsarawong (1943–1950, div); Pacha Sirivarasan (1960—1983, his death)
- Children: Mom Rajawongse Detchanasak Sakdidej Bhanubandh; Mom Rajawongse Thim Sakdidej Bhanubandh; Mom Rajawongse Onmani Bhanubandhu
- Parent(s): Phraya (Note: Phraya (พระยา) is Thai for "Lord") Ratchanupraphan (Pia Bunnag); Khunying Doris Windham Rachanupraphan

Khunying (Note: Khunying (คุณหญิง) is Thai for "Lady") Mani Sirivarasan (Thai: มณี สิริวรสาร; September 22, 1915 – September 27, 1999), born Mani Xenier Bunnag (มณี เซเนียร์ บุนนาค) or formerly Mom Mani Bhanubandhu na Ayudhya, (หม่อมมณี ภาณุพันธุ์ ณ อยุธยา) was a Thai teacher and social worker, and the former daughter-in-law of King Prajadhipok, Rama VII, as she was previously married to Prince Chirasakdi Supraphat, the adopted son of King Prajadhipok.

She is the author of the book "Life is Like a Dream", which is a book that describes the events towards the end of the life of King Prajadhipok in much detail. Khunying Mani also received a will during the change of government in the reign of King Rama VII, a 10 rai (1,600 m2, 4 acres) plot of land on Ploenchit Road, which is now Maneeya Center and the Renaissance Ratchaprasong Hotel.

== Early life and education ==
Khunying Mani was born Mani Xenier Bunnag in London, England. She was the daughter of Phraya Rachanupraphan (Pia Bunnag), the Thai ambassador to the St. James's Court, London, England and Doris Windham, an Englishwoman. In the memorial book for Khunying Mani's cremation, her mother's name was listed as Doris Grace Felto Power Rachanupraphan. Khunying Mani was the granddaughter of Chao Phraya Phanuwong Maha Kosathibodi (Tuam Bunnag). She had only one brother, Uthai Phanuwong. She had ten half-brothers and sisters.

1917, when Phraya Rachanupraphan (Pia Bunnag) brought his family back to Thailand, they stayed in a house that was granted by the King on Si Phraya Road, Soi Phraek Ban Nai, behind Wat Maha Phruettharam (Wat Takhian).

After her father's death, she continued her studies as a boarder at St. Mary's S.P.G. School, a Protestant missionary school with an English principal. After completing secondary school, she took the entrance exam for the Faculty of Arts, Chulalongkorn University. After studying for only two years, in 1935, she took the Civil Service Commission (Civil Service Commission) scholarship exam in the Arts department. She went on to study in England at Oxford University for two years until she got married. She spoke English and French.

== Marriages ==
=== First marriage ===
Manee fell in love with Prince Chirasakdi Supraphat, or "Jerry" as he introduced himself to Mani, who was also studying in the United Kingdom. Their relationship led to their engagement on September 22, 1938, and their wedding ceremony at the Thai Embassy in London, presided over by King Prajadhipok and Queen Rambhai Barni on December 21, 1938. As a result, Manee resigned from Oxford University after two years of study. King Prajadhipok then signed a money order to pay for Mom Manee's scholarship to the Thai government, as Mom Mani had not yet repaid her scholarship.

Prince Chirasak Supraphat and Mom Mani had two sons together, whose descendants were given the surname Sakdidetphanuphan Na Ayutthaya. During World War II, Prince Chirasak Supraphat worked with the ATA company as a pilot and was also a Free Thai in England. This resulted in Prince Chirasak Supraphat's death while piloting a plane and crashing in Scotland while he was on duty.

=== Second marriage ===
After the death of her first husband, the following year Mom Mani married for the second time to Prince Aphatsarawong, who was the elder brother of Prince Chirasak Supraphat. They had only one daughter, Mom Rajawongse Onmani Bhanubandhu, also Aura, (born October 10, 1943) Khunying Aura was first married to Police Lieutenant Colonel Chumphon Nilawatthananon and secondly to Watthana Niwetmarin. She had two children from her first marriage and one from her second marriage. In 1947, Prince Aphatsarawong took her family back to Thailand. Upon her return to Thailand, Mom Mani took a position as a special lecturer in English at the Faculty of Arts, Chulalongkorn University, at the invitation of Her Royal Highness Princess Prem Purachatra, who was the head of the department at the time. After divorcing Prince Aphatsarawong, she resigned from her position as a special lecturer at Chulalongkorn University and built a new house on Ploenchit Road, accepting work translating Thai articles into English for the American news agency.

=== Third and final marriage ===
Later, Mom Mani returned to stay in England to visit her mother and son who were studying there. She worked as the head of the Thai language broadcasting department for BBC Radio for about a year before returning to Thailand. In 1960, she remarried to Major General Dr. Pacha Sirivarasan and lived together for 23 years. They had two adopted children, Phanuphon and Phanini Sirivarasan, who were Mom Rajawongse Onmani's children born to her first husband until Dr. Pacha's death in 1983.

== Personal life ==
While studying at Assumption College, Khunying Mani was inclined to convert to Roman Catholicism. However, her father, Phraya Rachanupraphan, strongly dissuaded her and forced her to drop out of the school. After her father's death, Khunying Mani enrolled at St. Mary's S.P.G. School. She decided to convert to Protestantism, as advised by her teachers and in line with her faith in Jesus. However, Khunying Mani later realized that her previous beliefs were superstitious and reverted to Buddhism, continuing to practice Buddhist teachings.

Khunying Mani died of lung cancer on September 27, 1999 at Bumrungrad International Hospital, Bangkok, at the age of 84.

== Public welfare ==
Khunying Mani and Major General Dr. Pacha Sirivarasan donated funds to build a four-story ENT (ear, nose, and throat) patient building with modern operating rooms, and presented it to Phramongkutklao Hospital. They requested royal permission to name the building "Sakdidej Building." In 1971, Her Majesty Queen Rambhai Barni graciously presided over the opening ceremony of the building. Later, they donated funds to build Phra Pok Klao Hospital in Chanthaburi Province and donated one million baht to the Royal Thai Army Medical Department to establish the "Sakdidej" Foundation to procure medical equipment and maintain the building. The foundation was established at Wat Ratchabophit, with the proceeds donated annually to monks as a royal merit to His Majesty King Prajadhipok.

Khunying Mani also assisted in social welfare work with various women's associations and served as a board member for several associations. She also helped raise funds to construct a building for the Foundation for Higher Education Women, which is still used as an office building for the Foundation and the Association of Higher Education Women of Thailand.

== Insignia ==
1989 - The Most Illustrious Order of Chula Chom Klao, Third Class, Chulalongkorn University Third Class (T.C.) (Female Officer)

1974 - The Most Exalted Order of the White Elephant, Third Class, Knight Grand Cross (T. C.)
