= Vincenzo de Domini =

Vincenzo de Domini (Casarsa della Delizia 1816 – Fiume 1903). Son of Giovanni Fortunato and Chiara Bottigetti. Studied for naval officer he started as a cadet of the Austrian Navy. Settled in Fiume in 1846 as professor of Nautical Sciences at the local nautical school. A Venetian patriot, close to the circles of Kossuth, he will be entrusted together with Gaspare Matcovich and Spiridione Gopcevich (1815 - 1861) with the project to turn the brick Implacable into a Hungarian man of war. The armament of the ship, commanded by de Domini, led Jelačić to send an expedition and occupy Fiume on 31 August 1848 with Croat troops.

After the Hungarian defeat in 1849 de Domini was jailed together with Gaspare Matcovich in the Triestine Castle of San Giusto, because of his involvement as an English agent in the Hungarian revolution. He managed to escape to London. After being amnestied he returned to Fiume where he taught at the local nautical school that at the time of Croatian suzerainty over the city (1849 - 1869) was privatized and renamed Collegio Nautico-commerciale. De Domini was the owner and there he taught Nautical Sciences, writing several books on the subject.

== Books ==
- Compendio di cognizioni nautiche ad uso de´ giovani marini (Fiume, E. Rezza, 1858; 2nd ed. Tipo-litografia Mohovich, 1877);
- Lezioni di manovra navale (Fiume, E. Rezza, 1862);
- Sull´invenzione della bussola nautica. Discorso. (Fiume, 1861);
- Le scienze naturali e la nautica (Fiume, Mohovich, 1869);
- Quesiti d´igiene, fisica e meteorologia proposti al XIV Congresso dei medici e naturalisti ungheresi convenuti in Fiume nel Settembre 1869 (Fiume, Mohovich 1869);
- Della bussola considerata ne' suoi rapporti alla navigazione. Cenni esposti agli alunni che compivano il corso nauticonel Collegio nautico-commerciale di Fiume all' occasione della chiusura dell'anno scolastico 1857-58 (Fiume : Tip. di Ercole Rezza, 1858).
