= Wat Phra Dhammakaya Manchester =

Thai Buddhist temple in England

Coordinates: 53.4923°N 2.2815°W

Wat Phra Dhammakaya Manchester (Thai: วัดเจริญภาวนา แมนเชสเตอร์; lit. 'the temple for cultivation of meditation'), also known in English as the North-West Centre for Buddhist Meditation, is a Thai Buddhist temple in Salford, England. Established on 8 February 2004 in a converted curtain-rail factory, it was the first Thai Buddhist temple in the northwest of England.

The temple was named Wat Phra Dhammakaya Manchester by the Thai community, and was consecrated with the blessing of the Most Venerable Phrarajbhavanavimol, head of the Thai Buddhist mission to England.

The temple was accepted as an official place for religious worship (no.81212) on 4 June 2004 with the help of the Thai Culture Forum UK.

Originally the temple had no Buddha image. The eight-foot Buddha image which has pride of place in the main shrine room was rescued from a roadside in Cardiff.

The temple runs a variety of pastoral services for the Buddhist community in Manchester and marks most of the events in the Thai Buddhist calendar. A variety of evening classes on Buddhism and meditation are run on weekdays and Thai language classes on weekends.
