= Henry Charles Cunliffe-Owen =

British Army officer (1821–1867)

H. C. Cunliffe-Owen CB
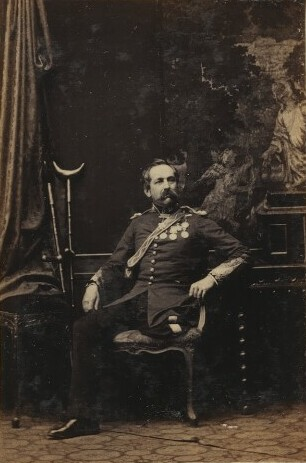
- Albumen print by Camille Silvy, 28 May 1862
- Born: 16 October 1821; Lausanne, Switzerland
- Died: 7 March 1867 (aged 45); Plymouth, England
- Spouse: Agnes Cubitt (m. 1855)
- Military career
- Allegiance: United Kingdom
- Service: British Army: Royal Engineers
- Service years: 1839–1867
- Rank: Lieutenant-colonel; Bvt. Colonel
- Conflicts: Seventh Kaffir War; Crimean War (WIA)

Henry Charles Cunliffe-Owen, CB (1821–1867) was an English officer in the British Army, rising to the rank of lieutenant-colonel in the Royal Engineers. After graduating from Woolwich, he served variously, including in the campaign against insurgent Boers, and in the Kaffir War of 1845–1847, in the Cape. Returning to England, he was appointed to civilian posts: general superintendent of the Great Exhibition of 1851, and afterwards inspector of art schools in the department of practical art. This last appointment he resigned to fight in the Crimean War, and he was gravely wounded before Sebastopol; whereupon he was made a C.B. and pensioned. He later served as deputy inspector-general of fortifications, from 1856 to 1860, and commanding Royal Engineer of the western district, from 1860. He was made regimental lieutenant-colonel in 1862. He was a staunch High Church Anglican.

== Origins ==
Henry Charles Cunliffe-Owen, son of Captain Charles Cunliffe-Owen, Royal Navy, from the ancient family of Cunliffe of Wycoller, and of his wife Mary, daughter of Sir Henry Blosset, Knt., Chief Justice of Bengal, was born at Lausanne, Switzerland, on 16 October 1821. Sir Francis Philip Cunliffe-Owen was his brother. He was educated privately, and, after passing through the Royal Military Academy at Woolwich, obtained a commission as second lieutenant in the Corps of Royal Engineers on 19 March 1839. He went to Chatham for the usual course of professional instruction, and thence to Devonport.

== Early career ==
In January 1841 Owen was sent to the Mauritius. On 30 September he was promoted lieutenant. In January 1845 he was ordered to the Cape of Good Hope, where he took part in the campaign then going on against the insurgent Boers, and in the Kaffir War of 1846–1847. He was thanked for his services in general orders, and he received the Kaffir war medal. On 28 October 1847 he was promoted second captain. Owen returned to England in April 1848, and was first quartered at Devonport and then at Chatham, until, in November 1850, he was permitted by the commander-in-chief to accept an appointment under the royal commission for the Exhibition of 1851 as computer of space for the United Kingdom, and later as superintendent of the foreign departments, and finally, after the exhibition was opened, as its general superintendent. Owen's courtesy, firmness, and business habits won him golden opinions. When the exhibition closed, Owen was appointed to another civil post—inspector of art schools in the department of practical art, then under the board of trade, with offices at Marlborough House. He was elected an associate-member of the Institution of Civil Engineers on 3 February 1852.

== Crimean War ==
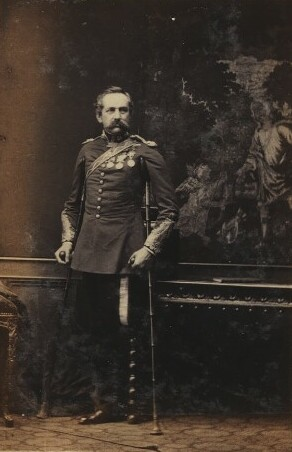
Another albumen print of Cunliffe-Owen by Camille Silvy, 28 May 1862

On the outbreak of the Crimean War Owen resigned his civil appointment. In January 1855 he joined the army before Sebastopol. He was very severely wounded by a musket-ball when engaged in the trenches in directing his men to turn some rifle-pits in front of the Redan, which had just been captured from the Russians. He lost his leg, and was invalided home. Owen was mentioned in despatches by Lord Raglan. He was made a C.B., given a pension of 100l. per annum, received the war medal and clasp, was appointed officer of the Legion of Honour, and received the fifth class of the Medjidie and the Turkish war medal. On 17 July 1855 he was promoted brevet-major.

== Later career ==
In October 1855 he was appointed assistant inspector-general of fortifications at the War Office, and in April 1856 deputy inspector-general of fortifications under Sir John Fox Burgoyne. The latter post he held until August 1860, when he was appointed commanding Royal Engineer of the western district. Owen had been promoted brevet lieutenant-colonel on 6 June 1856, and on 22 November 1861 he was promoted brevet-colonel. On 1 April 1862 he became a regimental lieutenant-colonel. During his command in the western district the important land and sea fortifications for the protection of the dockyard and naval base at Devonport, converting the place into a first-class fortress, were commenced, as well as the defences of the Severn at Breandown and at Steep and Flat Holmes, which were also in his district. The Plymouth defences absorbed most of Owen's time and attention, and it was while engaged in inspecting the progress of some of these works that he caught a chill, from the effects of which he died. Cunliffe-Owen died at his home, 3 Leigham Terrace, Plymouth, on 7 March 1867. He was buried in Plymouth cemetery. A stained-glass window was erected to his memory in the chancel of St. James's Church, Plymouth.

== Personal life ==
Owen married in 1855, in London, Agnes, daughter of Lewis Cubitt, Esq., by whom he left a son Edward, born on 1 January 1857. His widow married, in 1872, the Rev. Henry Edward Willington, M.A.

== Legacy ==
According to Robert Hamilton Vetch, "Owen was a man of charming manner, and a most pleasant companion. A hard worker and devoted to his profession, his sympathies were broad and many-sided. He was a good man, and generally loved." He was a High Churchman, a friend of Edward Bouverie Pusey, and one of the original founders of the English Church Union. There entered the possession of his son a sepia drawing of him as a child, and a life-sized medallion of him in later life done by Francis Adams. Owen contributed the following papers to the Professional Papers of the Corps of Royal Engineers, in vol. ix. new series, "Experiments in Breaching a Merlon of Masonry at Gibraltar in 1859"; in vols. xii. and xiii., "Fortifications versus Forts"; in vol. xiv., "Remarks on Expense Magazines".

== Honours ==
- Companion of the Order of the Bath
- Officer of the Legion of Honour
- Order of the Medjidie Fifth Class
- Crimea Medal, with clasp
- Turkish Crimea Medal
- Kaffir War Medal

== Sources ==
- O'Byrne, William R. (1849). "Owen (Commander 1815. F-P., 14; H-P., 32.) Charles Cunliffe Owen". A Naval Biographical Dictionary. London: John Murray. pp. 844–845.
- Vetch, R. H.; Stearn, Roger T. (2008). "Owen, Henry Charles Cunliffe- (1821–1867), army officer". Oxford Dictionary of National Biography (online ed.). Oxford University Press. doi:10.1093/ref:odnb/21004. (Subscription, Wikipedia Library access or UK public library membership required.)

Attribution:

- This article incorporates text from a publication now in the public domain: Vetch, Robert Hamilton (1895). "Owen, Henry Charles Cunliffe-". In Lee, Sidney (ed.). Dictionary of National Biography. Vol. 42. London: Smith, Elder & Co. pp. 413–414.
