= Fort Austin =

British naval base

- Plymouth; Devon; England
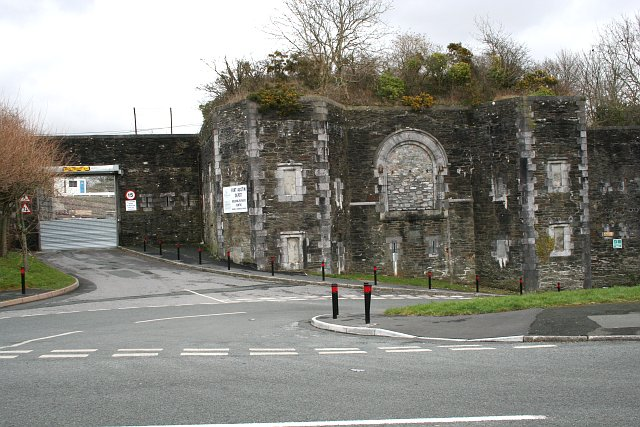
- Entrance to Fort Austin, showing bricked up original entrance on the right

Site information
- Owner: Privately owned
- Controlled by: Plymouth City Council
- Open to the public: No
- Condition: Largely intact with some alterations

Location
- Coordinates: 50°23′59″N 4°06′12″W

Site history
- Built: 1863-1868
- In use: Now a Buddhist Temple
- Materials: Earth; Masonry

Fort Austin is a former 19th-century Fort, built as a result of the Royal Commission on National Defence of 1859. It was built to defend the landward approaches to the North East of Plymouth. This was part of an overall scheme for the defence of the Royal Naval Dockyard at Devonport. They were known as Palmerston Forts after the Prime Minister who championed the scheme.

Designed by Captain (later Maj General) Edmund Frederick Du Cane, it was built by George Baker and Company and finished by the Royal Engineers. It was armed with fifteen guns and five mortars. To house part of the Forts' Garrison a barrack block to house 60 men was built within the rear section of the Fort.

By the early 1900s the Fort had become obsolete as a defensive position and was disarmed. During the Second World War it was used by the Devon and Cornwall Auxiliary Unit. It was sold by the War Office to Plymouth City Council in 1958. It was Grade II listed in 2008.

It is now a Thai Buddhist temple, established by Chao Khun Laow Panyasiri.

== Bibliography ==
- Hogg, Ian V (1974). Coast Defences of England and Wales 1856-1956. David & Charles. ISBN 0-7153 6353-0.
- Woodward, Freddy (1996). The Historic Defences of Plymouth. Cornwall County Council. ISBN 978-1898166467.

== External sources ==
- Palmerston Forts Society
