= Dominique Jackson =

Dominique Jackson may refer to:

- Dominique Jackson (British actress) (born 1991), British television and film actress
- Dominique Jackson (model) (born 1975), Tobagonian-American actress, author, model, and reality television personality
- Dominique Jackson (politician), former member of the Colorado House of Representatives
