= Dominó (Chile) =

Chilean fast food restaurant chain

- Dominó logo
- Industry: Restaurants
- Genre: Fuente de soda
- Founded: 1952 in Santiago, Chile
- Founder: Pedro Pubill
- Number of locations: 30
- Area served: Chile
- Products: Completos; lomitos; churrascos; french fries; soft drinks; beer; salads; desserts; coffee
- Website: www.dominó.cl

Dominó is a Chilean chain of fuente de soda restaurants, a type of establishment specializing in Chilean-style fast food. While the completo is what they are best known for, Dominó also serves Chilean-style sandwiches, empanadas and salads. Beginning with one location in central Santiago, Dominó has since expanded to have locations across the country.

== History ==
The first Dominó opened in 1952 on Agustinas street. This location is still in operation to this day. Founded by Pedro Pubill, he sought to bring an American style soda fountain restaurant (which were very popular at the time) to Chile. As Dominó established itself, it became known for its creativity in their menu. Many consider Dominó to be the first to set the trend of having numerous different unique completo combinations.

Dominó would operate solely out of their original location until 1995 when they opened their second location also in central Santiago. This expansion would be followed by the addition of one more location in 1999 followed by a large expansion in 2000s which would bring their total locations to over 30.

== Products ==
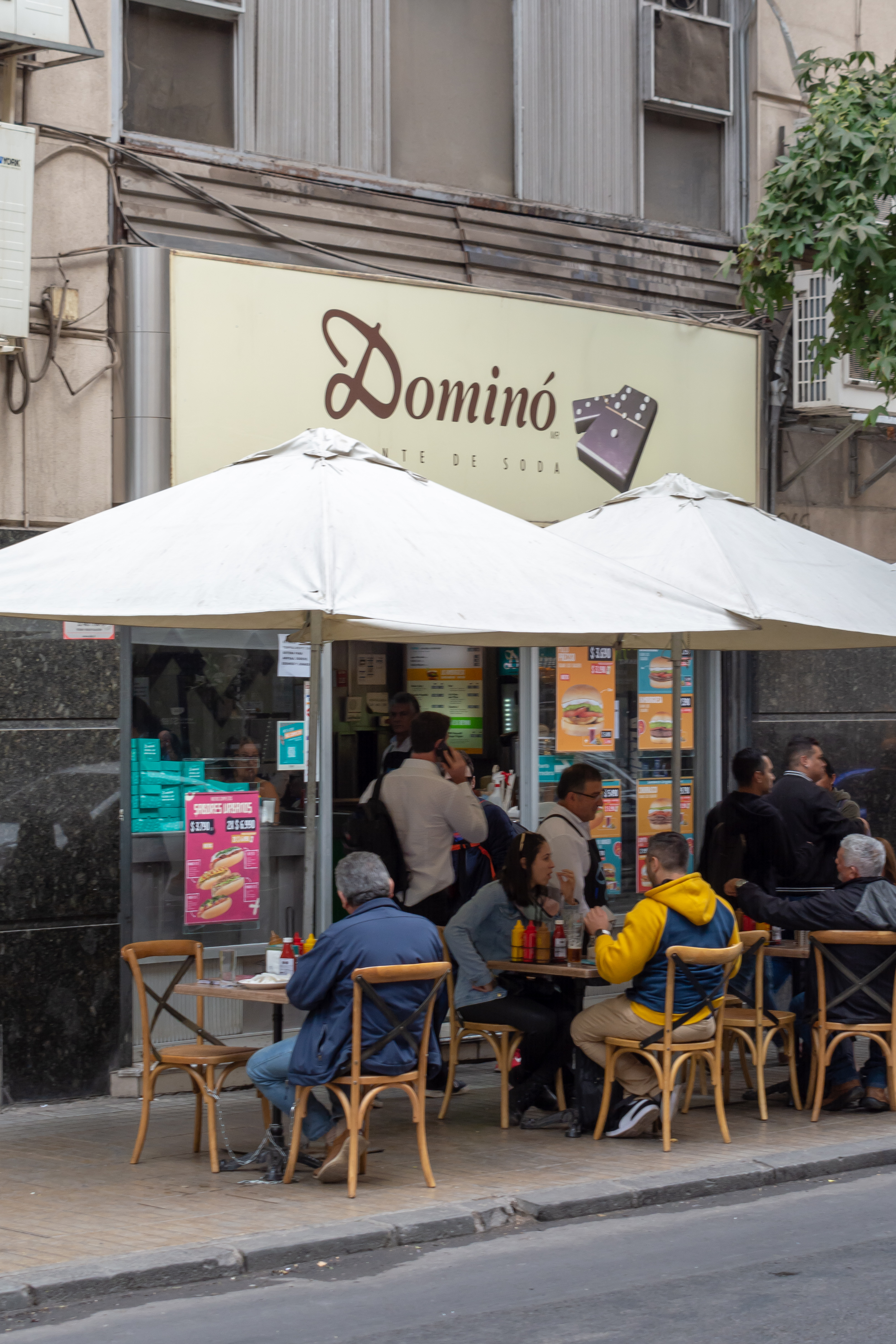
Dominó location in Santiago

Dominó specializes in food typically found at fuente de sodas. Fuentes de sodas are a traditional style of fast-food restaurant found in Chile that serve foods such as churrascos, lomitos and completos. While Dominó serves all of these aforementioned items, they are most known for their completo. Currently they serve sixteen variations of completos, ranging from the classic completo italiano (tomato, avocado, mayo) to the more unique turco (egg and cheese).

=== Completos ===
Dominó has more variations of the completo than a typical fuente de soda. Each of their variations is referred to with a specific name, which is not uncommon in Chile. In addition to the traditional variations, Dominó has completos such as the alemana (tomato, sauerkraut, mayo), the rodeo (cheese, barbecue sauce and bacon) and the irlandesa (lettuce, tomato and mayo).

=== Sandwiches ===
Dominó offers the typical styles of sandwiches found at fuente de sodas, namely churrascos (thin slices of beef), lomitos (braised pork) and mechadas (Chilean-style roast beef). Similarly to the completos, these sandwiches can be topped with many different variations of toppings.

== See also ==
- Completos
- Chilean cuisine
