= Dominique Woolf =

English food writer and entrepreneur

- Born: Dominique Alexis Woolf; 1978 (age 47–48); Saudi Arabia
- Years active: 2019–present
- Children: 3
- Culinary career
- Cooking style: Asian (South East, fusion)
- Television show
- The Great Cookbook Challenge
- Website: thewoolfskitchen.com

Dominique Alexis Woolf (born 1978) is an English food writer, entrepreneur, and former musician. She runs The Woolf's Kitchen and, after winning Jamie Oliver's The Great Cookbook Challenge, published the #1 Sunday Times bestselling cookbook Dominique's Kitchen (2022). This was followed by The Asian Pantry (2024).

== Early life ==
Woolf was born in Saudi Arabia to an English father and a Thai mother and grew up in Qatar, where her father taught English, until age 8. She also has Chinese heritage on her maternal side and Dutch and Swiss heritage on her paternal side, and her father is a distant relative of Virginia Woolf.

== Career ==
After working in sales and recruitment for a decade, Woolf went into music. She fronted a group called Wolfette and featured on and contributed to a number of artists' tracks in vocals and songwriting. She played at gigs such as Glastonbury Festival. Woolf retired from music to make time for her family.

Upon deciding to pursue cooking professionally in 2019, Woolf enrolled in an online Leiths School of Food and Wine course and an Amazon Small Business programme. In June 2020, Woolf founded her business The Woolf's Kitchen, selling an array of homemade sauces, condiments, and other pantry items. As of 2021, her products were being stocked in shops such as Selfridge's and by 2022, The Woolf's Kitchen was generating £150 thousand in revenue per year. Woolf was a finalist for the Enterprise Nation's Female Start-up of the Year Award, and her brand received four 2021 Great Taste accolades.

Also in 2022, Woolfe won Jamie Oliver's Channel 4 competition The Great Cookbook Challenge, through which she published her debut cookbook Dominique's Kitchen via Penguin Michael Joseph (PMJ). Dominique's Kitchen became a #1 Sunday Times bestseller.

Woolfe reunited with PMJ to publish her second cookbook The Asian Pantry June 2024. The Woolf's Kitchen was launched on Ocado that autumn.

== Personal life ==
Woolf lives in Crouch End with her husband and their three children.

== Bibliography ==
- Dominique’s Kitchen: Easy Everyday Asian-inspired Food from the Winner of Channel 4's The Great Cookbook Challenge (2022)
- The Asian Pantry: Quick & Easy, Everyday Dishes Using Big Asian Flavours (2024)
