= Wat Buddhapadipa =

Thai Buddhist temple in Wimbledon, London

Coordinates: 51.4307°N 0.2206°W

- วัดพุทธปทีป
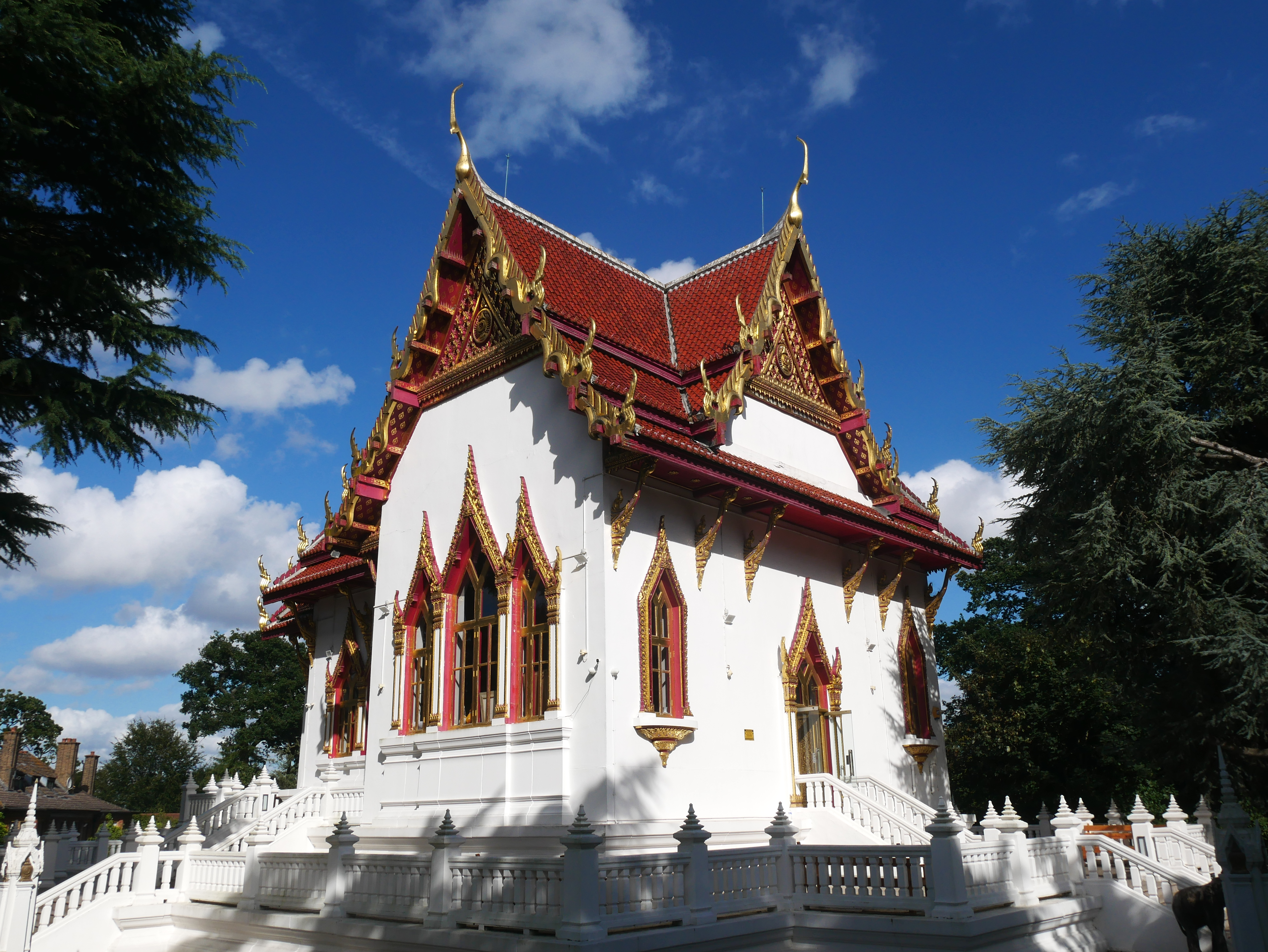

Religion
- Affiliation: Buddhist
- Sect: Theravāda
- Leadership: Chao Khun Laow Panyasiri (abbot)

Location
- Location: 14 Calonne Road, Wimbledon, London, SW19 5HJ
- Country: United Kingdom
- Interactive map of Wat Buddhapadipa

Architecture
- Architect: Praves Limparangsri
- Type: Ubosot
- Completed: 1982
- Construction cost: 33 million Thai baht

Website
- watbuddhapadipa.org

Wat Buddhapadipa or the Buddhapadipa Temple (Thai: วัดพุทธปทีป, pronounced [wát pʰút.tʰá.pà.tʰîːp]; RTGS: Wat Phutthapathip) is a Thai Buddhist temple in Wimbledon, London. The temple is under Thai royal patronage.

== History of the temple ==
=== Origins ===
The temple (wat) was originally established at 99 Christchurch Road, East Sheen. The property was purchased by the Thai government for £17,000 on 24 August 1965, and the first monks took up residence on 15 November. King Bhumibol and Queen Sirikit formally opened the temple on 1 August 1966, on Āsāḷha Pūjā. King Bhumibol also gave the temple its name, which means "Light of the Buddha".

The desire to construct an ordination hall (ubosot) eventually meant that the temple had to be moved to a different location. In 1975, the Barrogill estate at 14 Calonne Road, Wimbledon, was purchased, and the monks moved there the following year. Situated on four acres of land, the estate had ample space for the construction of the hall.

=== Ordination hall ===
The ordination hall was designed by the Thai architect Praves Limparangsri, and cost approximately 33 million Thai baht (£825,000). The new temple received royal consecration on 3 April 1982, and Princess Galyani Vadhana presided over the setting of the boundary stones (bai sema) around the hall on 30 October.

Inside the ordination hall are three statues of the Buddha:

- The Black Buddha (Thai: หลวงพ่อดำ; RTGS: Luang Pho Dam), which was created from bronze in the Sukhothai period and is 650–700 years old. A wealthy woman in Bangkok presented it to King Bhumibol on 20 June 1966 so that it could be placed in the new temple in East Sheen.
- The Golden Buddha (Thai: หลวงพ่อทอง; RTGS: Luang Pho Thong), which was specially created for the ordination hall.
- A replica of the Emerald Buddha of Wat Phra Kaew.

=== Abbot ===
Phra Thepphawanamongkhon (Thai: พระเทพภาวนามงคล) became the abbot of Wat Buddhapadipa in 1994. He died in Siriraj Hospital in Bangkok on 18 November 2022, at the age of 96, after 75 rains.

On 30 January 2023, the Sangha Supreme Council appointed Chao Khun Laow Panyasiri as the new abbot. He had been the acting abbot since 25 November 2022.

== Murals ==
The murals inside the ordination hall were painted by thirty Thai artists over an eight-year period. The two principal artists were Panya Vijinthanasarn and Chalermchai Kositpipat. (Note: The twenty-eight artists who assisted Panya and Chalermchai were Sompop Budtarad, Pang Chinasai, Kittisak Nuallak, Pichit Tangcharoen, Suwan Khomthipayarat, Sakya Khunpolpitak, Boonkhwang Noncharoen, Phusit Phudsongkhram, Sanan Sinchalaem, Prakit Kobkitwattana, Nopadol Itthipongsakul, Paisan Paovises, Apichai Piromrak, Uthai Comwingwarn, Sittichoke Kornnark, Daeng Kutipek, Prasat Chandrasupa, Roengsak Boonyavanishkul, Niramon Ruangsom, Suraphol Chinarat, Thongchai Srisukprasert, Teerawat Kanama, Alongkorn Lauwattana, Kanokwan Nakaapi, Areeporn Suwannanupong, Preeda Suetrong, Pichai Lertsawansri, and Sukanya Budtarad.) They employed a contemporary style that emphasized visual impact, which was unorthodox for Buddhist imagery; the work is now considered a pivotal moment in the development of the neo-traditional style of Thai art.

Work began in 1984. The central room was completed in 1987, but the two side rooms were not finished until 1992.

The murals in the central room relate the life of the Buddha, and the murals in the two side rooms relate the Mahānipāta Jātaka.

=== Central room ===
- Western wall. Among the scenes represented are the Birth of the Buddha in Lumbini, the Great Renunciation in Kapilavastu, and the First Sermon in Sarnath. Designed by Panya Vijinthanasarn.
- Northern wall. The Defeat of Mara and the Enlightenment in Bodh Gaya. Designed by Panya Vijinthanasarn.
- Eastern wall. Among the scenes represented are the Last Meal at Pāvā, the Parinibbāna in Kushinagar, and the Cremation and the Division of the Relics. Designed by Chalermchai Kositpipat.
- Southern wall. The Three Worlds (Traiphum). Designed by Chalermchai Kositpipat.

=== Western side room ===
- Western wall. Candakumāra Jātaka (7/542) (Note: See Mahānipāta Jātaka § Differences in the order of the stories.) and Nārada Jātaka (8/544). Designed by Pang Chinasai and Kittisak Nuallak.
- Northern wall. Vidhura Jātaka (9/545). Designed by Pang Chinasai and Kittisak Nuallak.
- Eastern wall. Vessantara Jātaka (10/547). Designed by Pang Chinasai and Kittisak Nuallak.
- Southern wall. Bhūridatta Jātaka (6/543). Designed by Pang Chinasai and Kittisak Nuallak.

=== Eastern side room ===
- Western wall. Nimi Jātaka (4/541). Designed by Sompop Budtarad.
- Northern wall. Temiya Jātaka (1/538). Designed by Sompop Budtarad.
- Eastern wall. Mahājanaka Jātaka (2/539) and Sāma Jātaka (3/540). Designed by Sompop Budtarad.
- Southern wall. Mahosadha Jātaka (5/546). Designed by Sompop Budtarad.

== Gallery ==
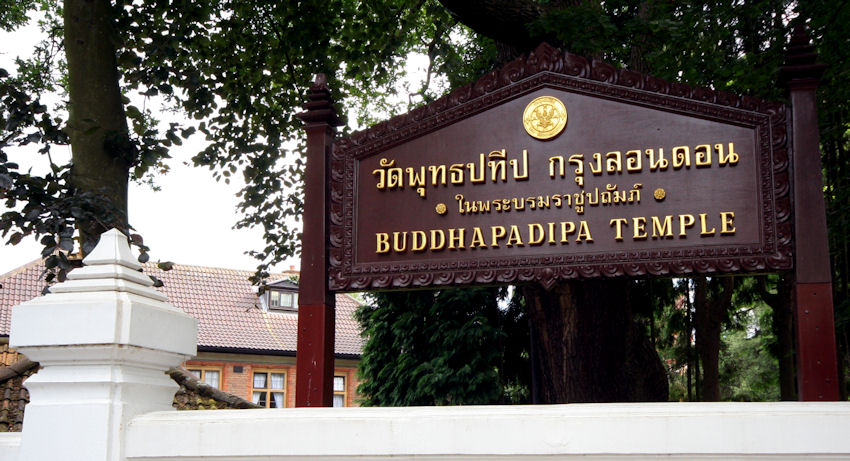
Signboard
(Note: The sign states in Thai that the temple is under royal patronage (ในพระบรมราชูปถัมภ์).)

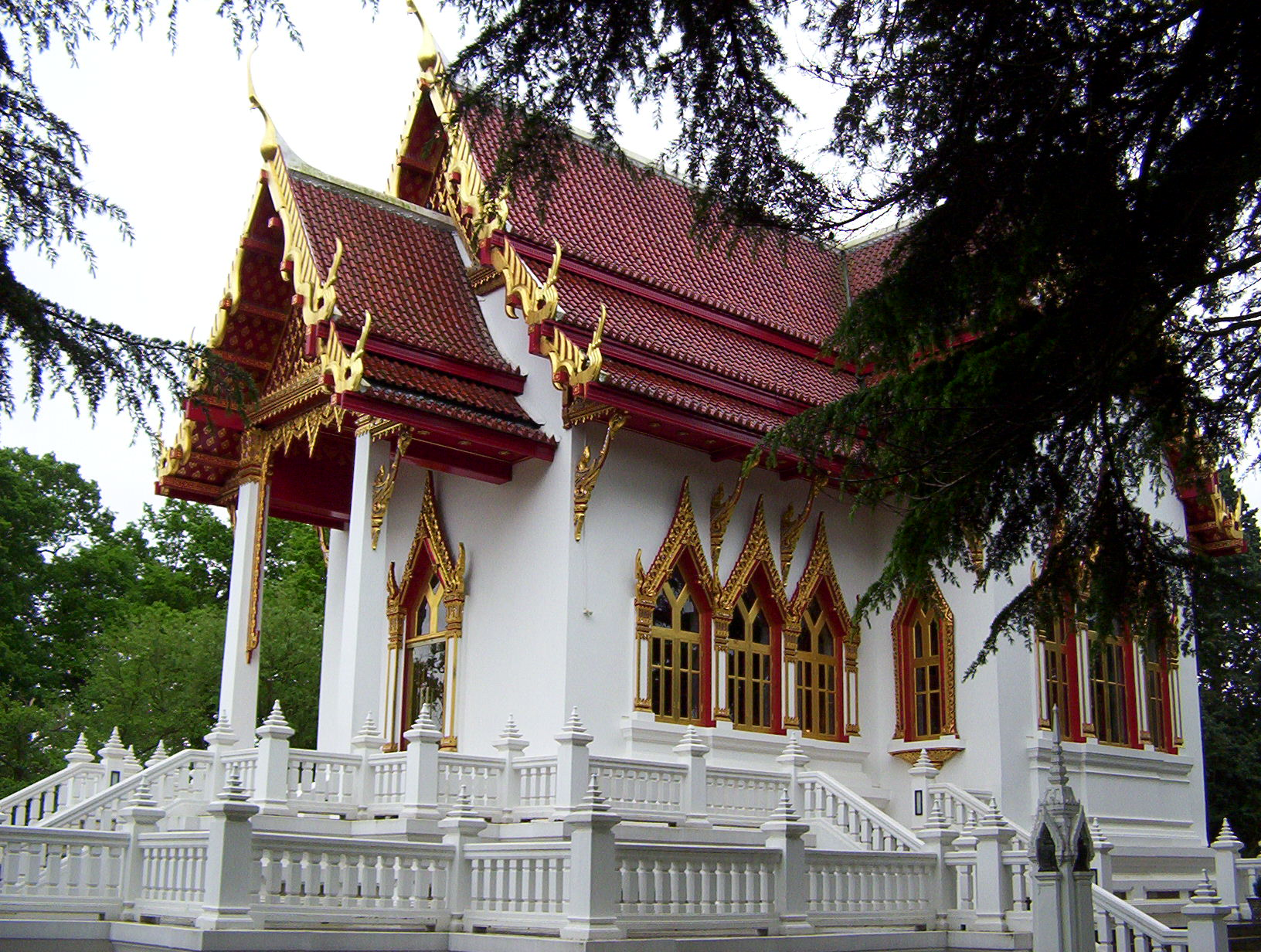
Ordination hall

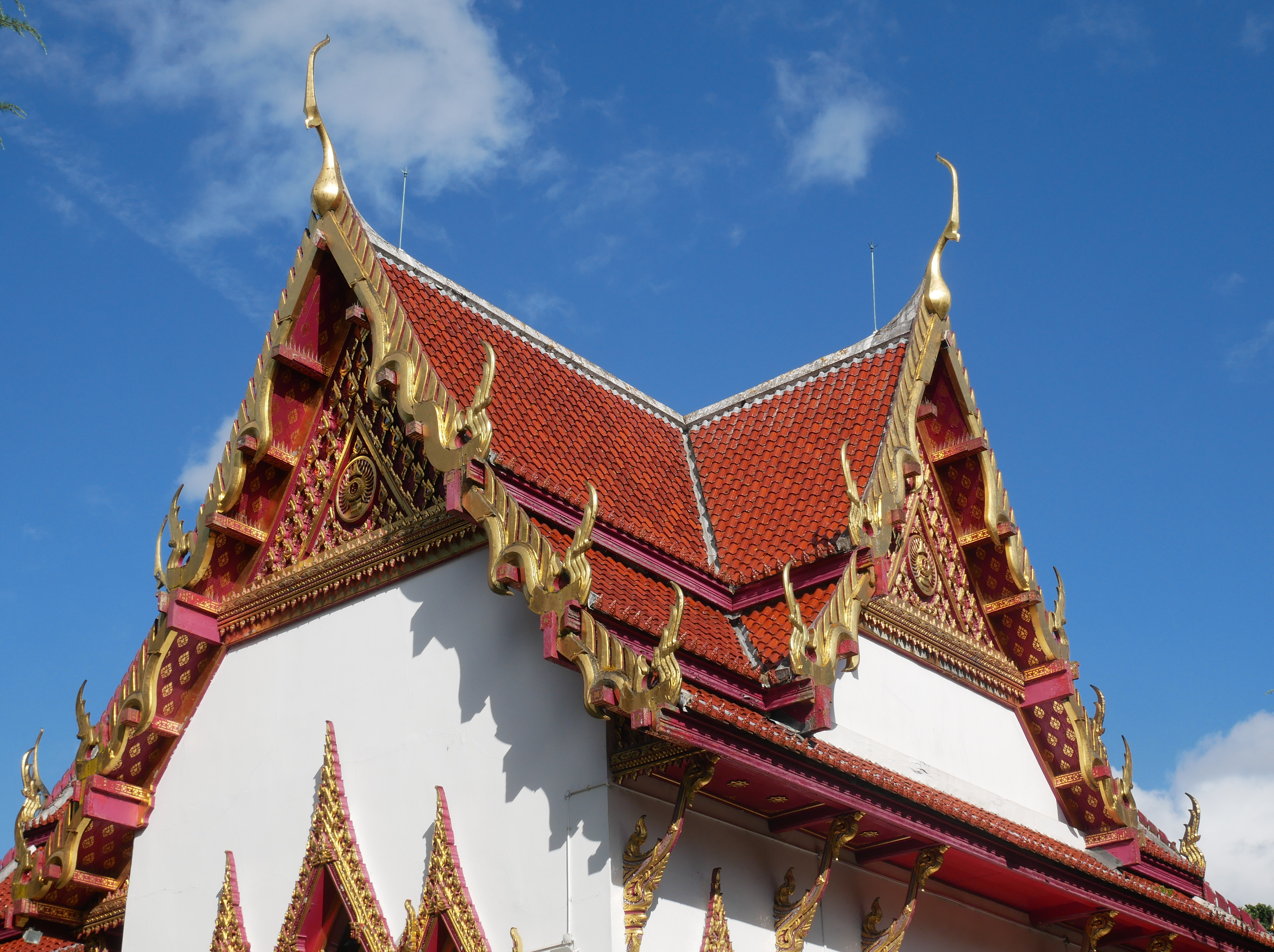
Roof of ordination hall

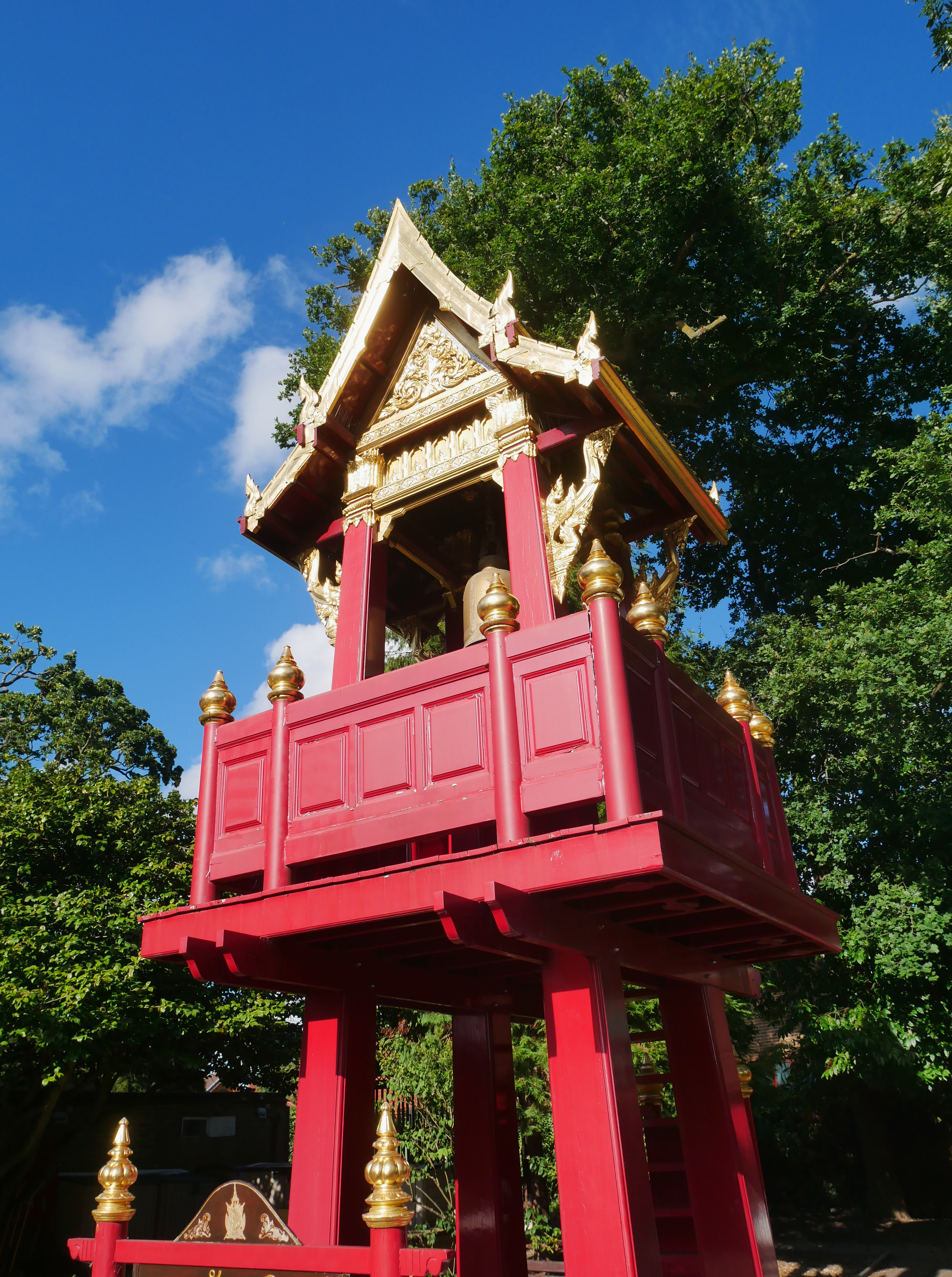
Bell tower

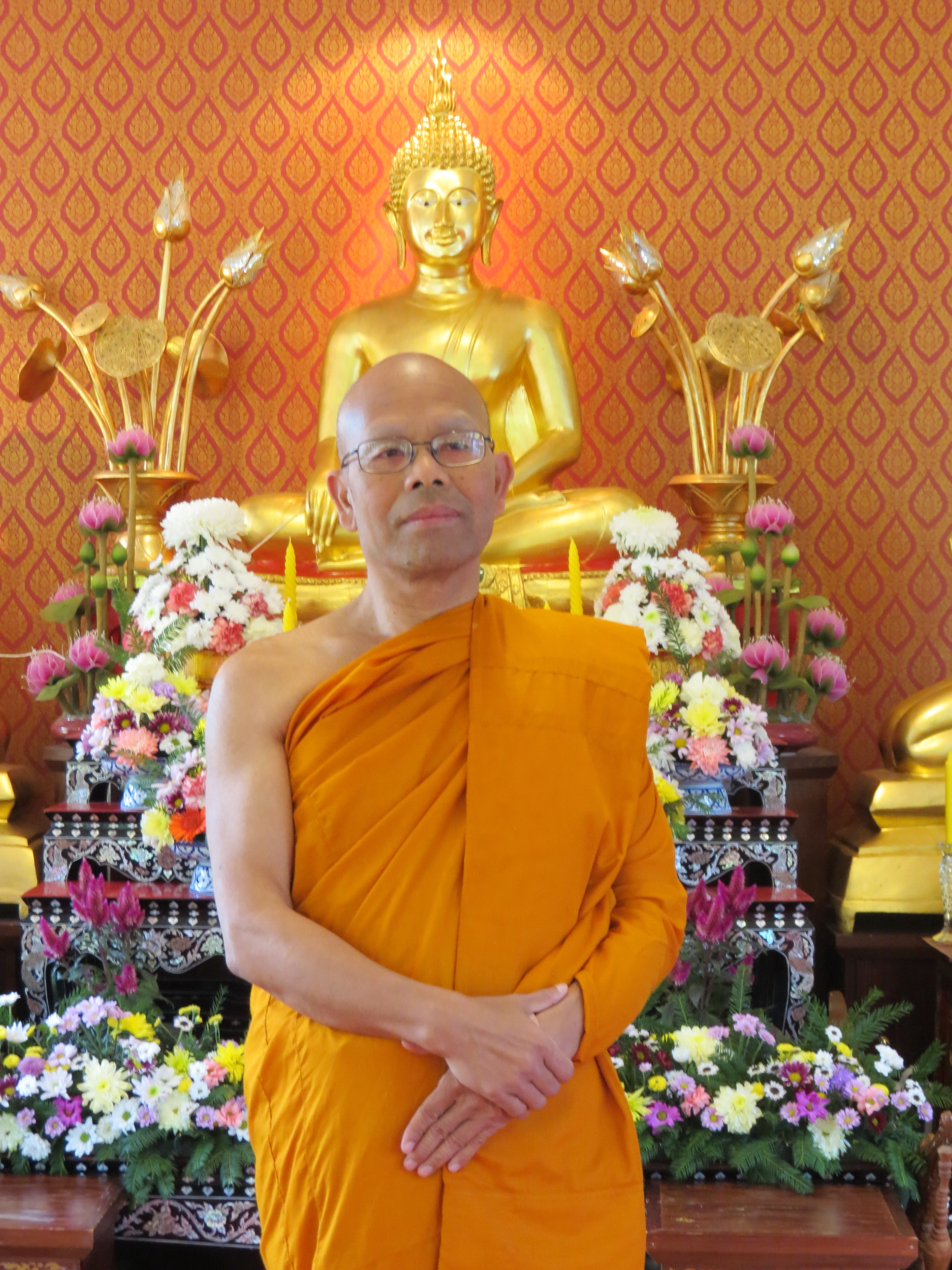
Chao Khun Laow
