= Domino Records (1916) =

American record label

Domino Records was a United States producer of early phonograph records. The company was originally named Empire Phonograph Corporation, but changed their name to Domino Phonograph Corporation in 1915, apparently before producing any products. The label debuted June 1916. They produced two-sided, 7-inch fine-groove vertical-cut disc records with a light-blue label and dark-blue lettering. Domino advertised their playing time as equal to that of a 10-inch disc. Playing time was actually around two-and-a-half minutes. The discs were marketed by two different companies; out of New York by the W.R. Anderson Company, and out of Dayton, Ohio, by the Thomas Manufacturing Company. Domino Records also made 7-inch pressings for other concerns, including Concert Records, Domestic Records, and Melodograph Records. In February 1917 a 10-inch red disc was introduced by Domino.

The product, consisting of standard material of the day, never achieved popularity with the public. Production and marketing had ceased by the end of 1917, and surviving examples are scarce.
