= Edmund Frederick Du Cane =

English major-general of the Royal Engineers and prison administrator

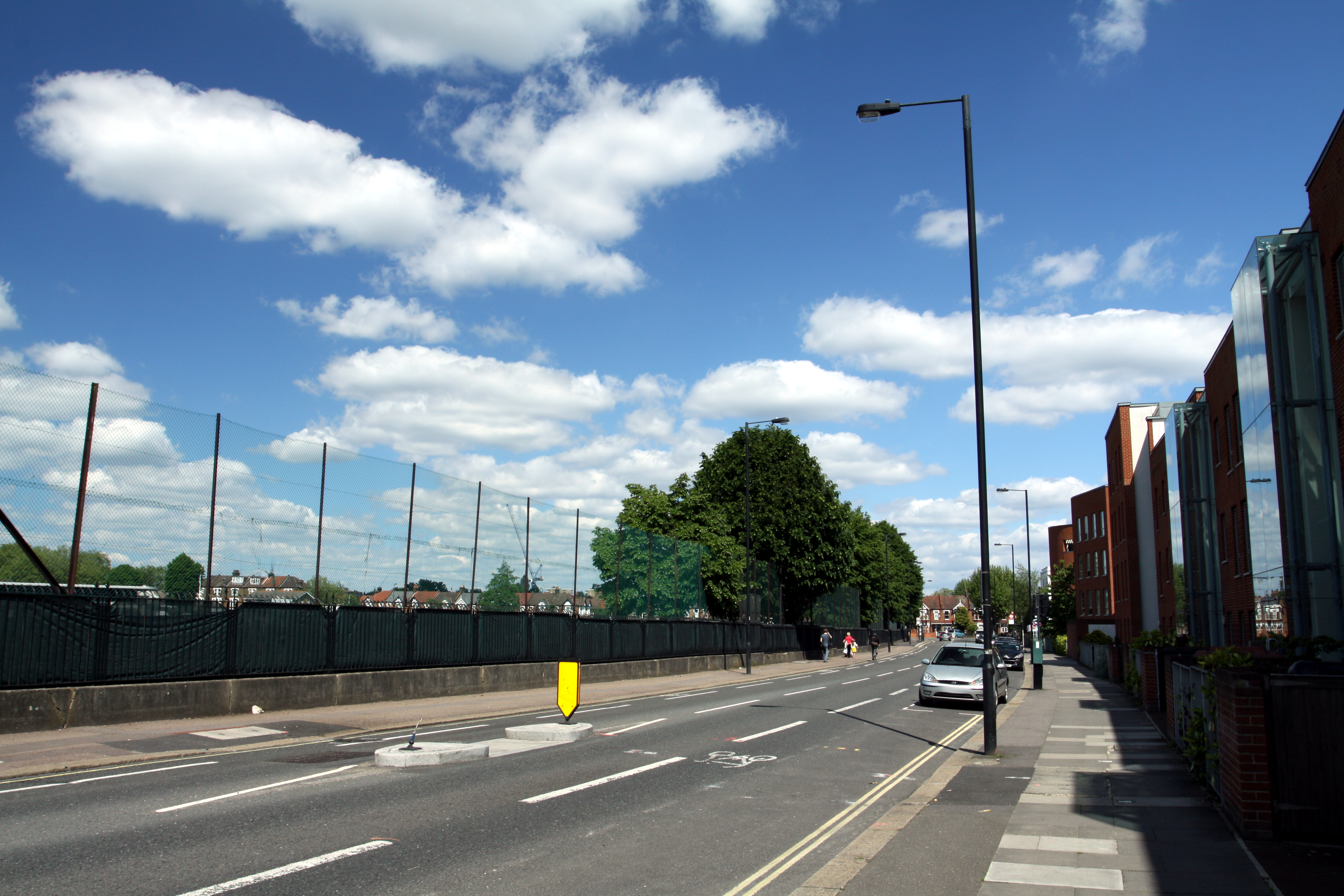
Du Cane Road in Shepherd's Bush, London is named after Sir Edmund Frederick Du Cane.

Sir Edmund Frederick Du Cane KCB (23 March 1830 – 7 June 1903) was an English major-general of the Royal Engineers and prison administrator.

== Early life ==
Born at Colchester, Essex on 23 March 1830, he was youngest child in a family of four sons and two daughters of Major Richard Du Cane (1788–1832), 20th Light Dragoons; his mother was Eliza, daughter of Thomas Ware of Woodfort, Mallow, County Cork.

After Dedham grammar school to 1843, and a private coaching establishment at Wimbledon (1843–46), he entered the Royal Military Academy at Woolwich in November 1846. He passed out at the head of his batch at the end of 1848, having taken first place in mathematics and fortification.

Du Cane received a commission as second lieutenant in the Royal Engineers on 19 December 1848. He joined at Chatham, and in December 1850 was posted to a company of royal sappers and miners commanded by Captain Henry Charles Cunliffe-Owen at Woolwich. He was assistant superintendent of the foreign side of the International Exhibition of 1851, and assistant secretary to the juries of awards.

== In Australia ==
From 1851 to 1856 Du Cane was employed in organising convict labour on public works in the Swan River Colony, in Western Australia, which was then first devoted to penal purposes under the command of Captain Edmund Henderson. Promoted first lieutenant on 17 February 1854, he was stationed at Guildford in charge of the works in the eastern district of the colony. He was made a magistrate of the colony and a visiting magistrate of convict stations.

== Return to the United Kingdom ==
Recalled early in 1856 by the Crimean War, Du Cane arrived home on 21 June to find the war over, and joined for duty at the war office, under the inspector-general of fortification, in August 1856. He was employed on designs and estimates for the new defences proposed for the dockyards and naval bases of the United Kingdom. Promoted second captain on 16 April 1858, he during the next five years designed most of the new land works at Dover, and the chain of land forts at Plymouth extending for five miles from Staddon Fort, in the east, across the River Plym, by Laira, to Ernesettle on the River Tamar.

== Prison administration ==
In 1863, on the recommendation of Henderson who had become chairman of the board of directors of convict prisons, Du Cane was appointed director of convict prisons, as well as an inspector of military prisons. He administered the system of penal servitude as it was reformed by the Prison Act 1865, and made the arrangements for additional prison accommodation after the abolition of penal transportation in 1867. In 1869 Du Cane succeeded Henderson as chairman of the board of directors of convict prisons, surveyor-general of prisons, and inspector-general of military prisons. On 5 February 1864 he was promoted first captain in his corps; on 5 July 1872 major; on 11 December 1873 lieutenant-colonel; and four years later brevet-colonel. He was placed on the supernumerary list in August 1877.

The charge of the colonial convict prisons was transferred to Du Cane in 1869. An advocate of using prison labour for works of national utility, (on which he read a paper before the Society of Arts in 1871) Du Cane provided for the carrying out by convicts of the breakwater and works of defence at Portland, the docks at Portsmouth and Chatham, and additional prison accommodation. At the International Prison Congress in London in 1872 Du Cane described the British system of penal servitude.

Du Cane's main success as prison administrator was the reorganisation of county and borough prisons, which had previously been managed by some 2000 local justices, and largely maintained by local funds. Du Cane in 1873 submitted to the secretary of state a comprehensive scheme for the transfer to the government of all local prisons and the whole cost of their maintenance. The reform was formalised by the Prison Act 1877, when Du Cane, who had been made C.B., civil division, on 27 March 1873, was promoted K.C.B., civil division, and became chairman of the three prison commissioners, under the new act to reorganise and administer the county and borough prisons.

On 1 April 1878 these prisons came under government control. Their number was soon reduced by one-half, the rules made uniform, the progressive system of discipline adopted, the staff co-ordinated into a single service with a regular system of promotion, structural and other improvements introduced, and the cost of maintenance largely reduced. Employment of prisoners was developed and the discharged prisoner was helped to earn a living.

== Criminology ==
Du Cane also inaugurated a registration of criminals. In 1877 he produced the first "Black Book" list, printed by convict labour, of over 12,000 habitual criminals with their aliases and descriptions. A register followed of criminals having distinctive marks on their bodies. Du Cane's suggestion to Sir Francis Galton that types of feature in different kinds of criminality were worth a scientific study prompted Galton to attempt composite portraiture. Du Cane also encouraged the use of Galton's finger-print system in the identification of criminals.

== Last years ==
Du Cane retired from the army with the honorary rank of major-general on 31 December 1887, and from the civil service on 23 March 1895. A set of his sketches of Peninsular War battlefields was exhibited at the Royal Military Exhibition at Chelsea in 1890.

Du Cane died at his residence, 10 Portman Square, London, on 7 June 1903, and was buried in Great Braxted churchyard, Essex.

== Memorial street ==
One of the prisons he designed was Wormwood Scrubs, and the street in which it is located is named Du Cane Road after him.

== Works ==
In 1885 Du Cane published in Macmillan's "Citizen" series The Punishment and Prevention of Crime, a historical sketch of British prisons and the treatment of crime. He contributed to periodicals, mainly on penology, and frequently wrote to The Times on military and other subjects. To the Royal Engineers Journal he sent memoirs of several of his brother officers.

== Family ==
Du Cane was twice married:

1. At St. John's Church, Fremantle, Western Australia, on 18 July 1855, to Mary Dorothea, daughter of Lieut.-colonel John Molloy, a Peninsula and Waterloo veteran of the Rifle Brigade, of Fairlawn, Busselton, Western Australia; she died on 13 May 1881.
2. At St. Margaret's, Westminster, on 2 January 1883, to Florence Victoria, widow of Colonel M. J. Grimston, of Grimston Garth and Kilnwick, Yorkshire, and daughter of Colonel Hardress Robert Saunderson.

By his first wife he had a family of three sons and five daughters. The manuscript diary of his daughter, Eliza Dorothea, is held at the Cadbury Research Library (University of Birmingham).

== Notes ==
Attribution

This article incorporates text from a publication now in the public domain: Lee, Sidney, ed. (1912). "Du Cane, Edmund Frederick". Dictionary of National Biography (2nd supplement). Vol. 1. London: Smith, Elder & Co.
