= Domino Records (1957) =

American record label

Domino Records was an American regional record label started in 1957 in Austin, Texas, United States. Artists included George Underwood, Clarence Smith and the Daylighters, Ray Campi, the Slades, Joyce Webb, Jesse Harris, and Joyce Harris. The label was led by Lora Jane Richardson from beginning to end (1957–1961). Operations ceased in the early 1960s.

== History ==
Domino Records was formed in 1957 by eleven classmates of a night-school course in music marketing, each of whom contributed a weekly sum of five dollars for corporate expenses. The most commercially successful record released by Domino was by a Caucasian doo-wop quartet originally named "The Spades", who soon changed their name to Slades since their original name was sometimes construed as a racial slur. The 1958 single "You Cheated" was a hit in Texas and drew the attention of much larger labels interested in national distribution. The biggest interest came from Dot Records, but Domino declined the distribution deal, deciding they wanted hire their own distributor and keep the group on Domino. The chosen distributor did not meet expectations, and copies intended for the national market remained in storage. Rebuffed, Dot then recorded their own group named "The Sheilds" to cover the Slades' song. Dot's version charted on Billboard at number 12, while the original just reached number 42. In 1959, the label put out a call to young artists local to Austin, hoping to find additional new talent. By the end of 1959 all but three of the original partners had departed, leaving the label moribund. These three, Anne Miller, Kathy Parker and Lora Jane Richardson, decided to re-start the label in 1960 and expand into new genres. The label, which encouraged its artists to self-pen their material, retained publishing rights to original songs. This decision led to an infusion of funds when The Fleetwoods covered the Slades' first recording "You Mean Everything to Me" as the B-side of "Mr. Blue." Otherwise success eluded the label, and it closed in 1961.

== Legacy ==
Domino Records is considered Austin's first noteworthy record label.

Sonny Rhodes felt that he was treated more fairly at Domino Records than he was with several other labels he recorded for.

In 1998 Ace Records released The Domino Records Story, a compilation of the label's releases.
