= Carving =

Shaping material via scraping with a tool

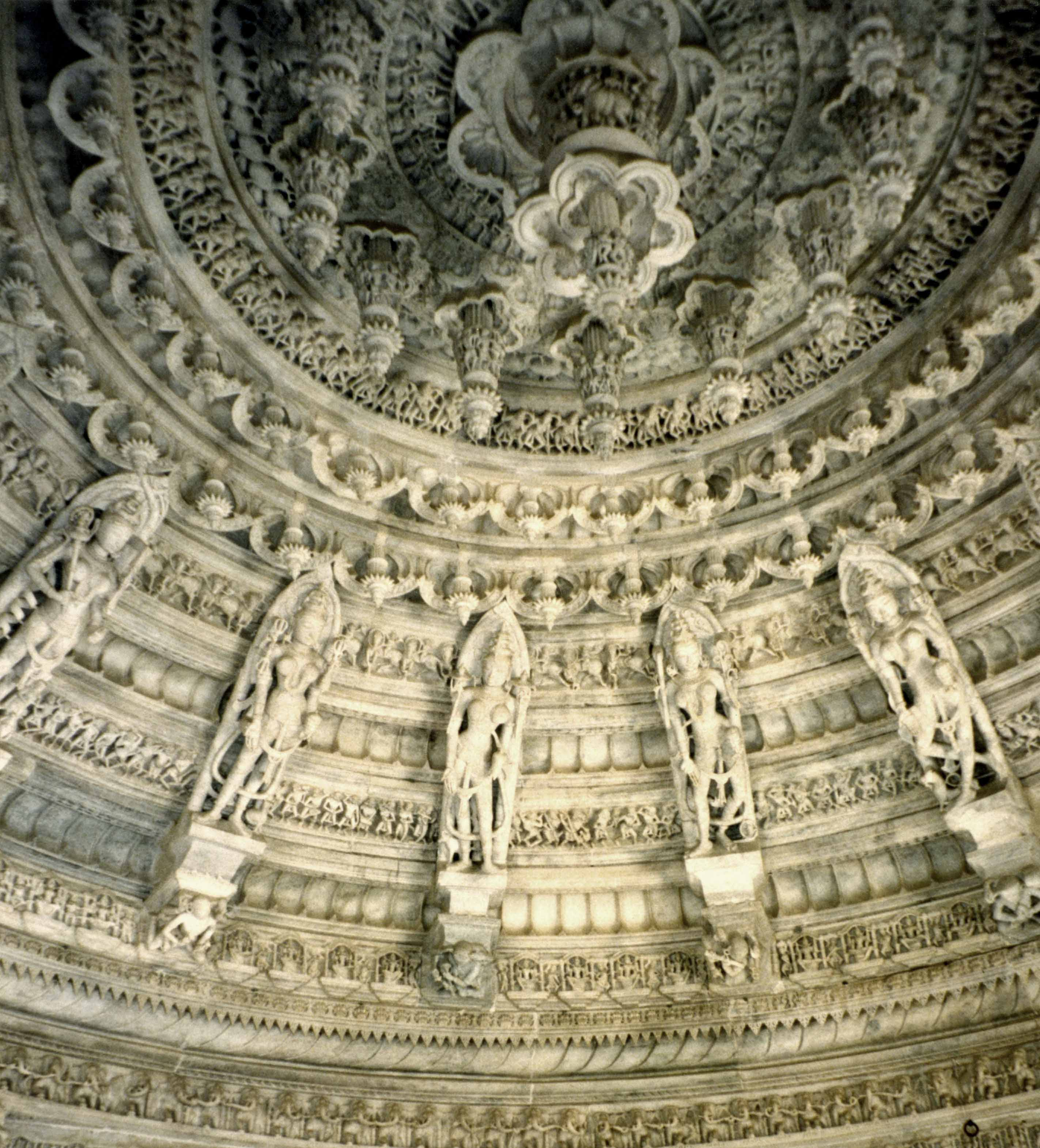
The ceiling of Dilwara Jain Temples is famous for its extraordinary marble stone carvings and architectural design.

Carving is the act of using tools to shape something from a material by scraping away portions of that material. The technique can be applied to any material that is solid enough to hold a form even when pieces have been removed from it, and yet soft enough for portions to be scraped away with available tools. Carving, as a means for making stone or wooden sculpture, is distinct from methods using soft and malleable materials like clay, fruit, and melted glass, which may be shaped into the desired forms while soft and then harden into that form. Carving tends to require much more work than methods using malleable materials.

== Types ==
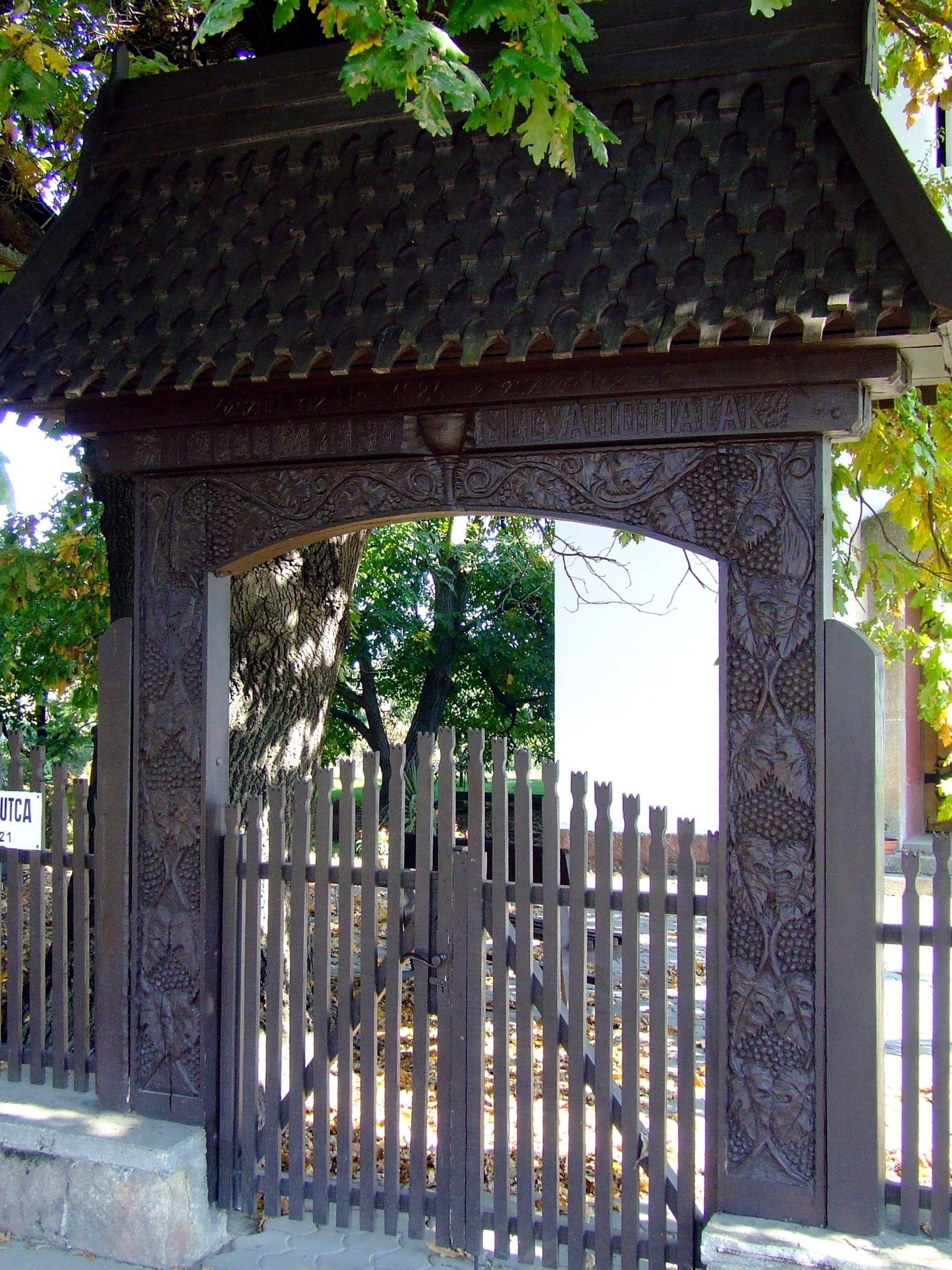
A carved Székely gate

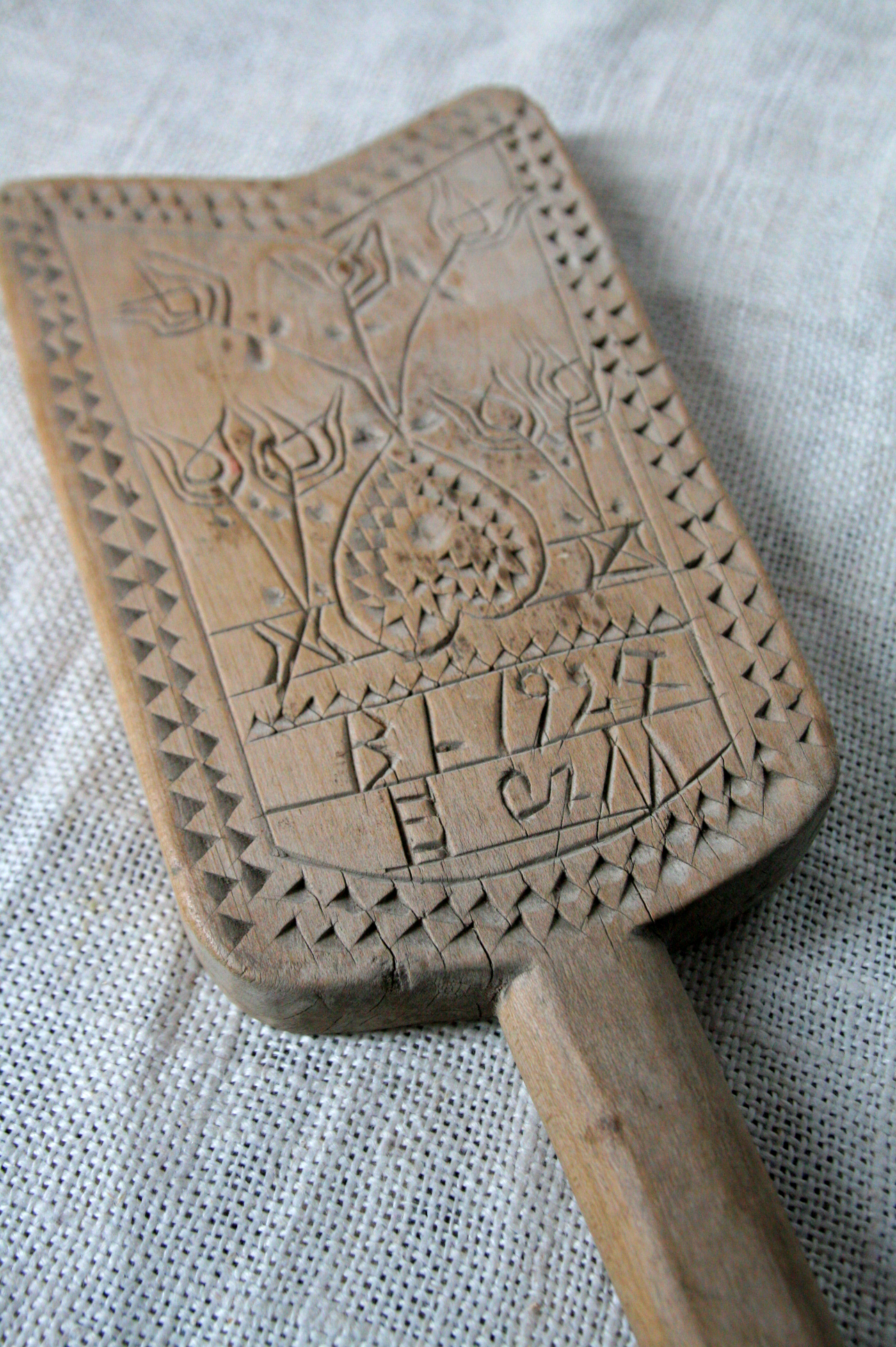
Székely wood carving

Kinds of carving include:

- Bone carving
- Chip carving
- Fruit carving
- Gourd carving or gourd art
- Hobo nickel
- Ice carving or ice sculpture
- Ivory carving
- Soap carving
- Stone carving
  - Petroglyph
- Tree carving
  - Arborglyph
- Vegetable carving
  - Thaeng yuak (Banana stalk carving)
- Wood carving

Carving particularly durable materials, such as stone, may be desired to make a display long-lasting, as in the case of reliefs of Ancient Egypt.

== Techniques ==
A variety of carving techniques exist. Relief carving carves a design into a flat surface to make it three-dimensional. Chip carving and whittling remove small pieces from a solid block of material (usually wood). Sculptural carving shapes material into a lifelike form.

== See also ==
- Engraving
- Sculpture
- Whittling
