= Thai fruit carving =

Traditional Thai art

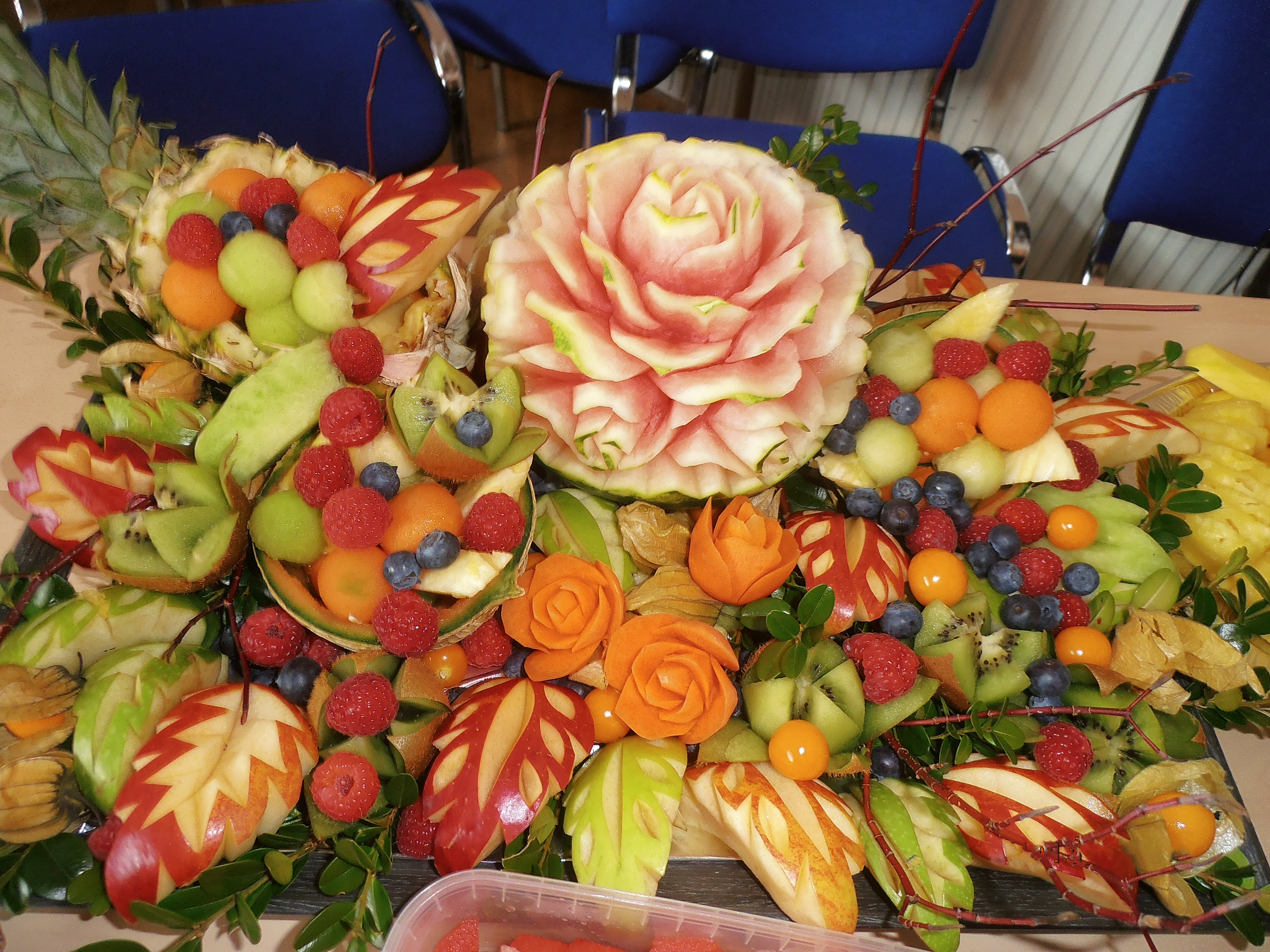
A platter of Thai fruit carvings

Thai fruit carving (Thai: การแกะสลักผลไม้, Thai pronunciation: [kāːn.kɛ̀ʔ.sa.làk.pʰǒn.la.máːj]) is a traditional Thai art that requires neatness, precision, meditation, and personal ability. Fruit carving persisted in Thailand as a respected art for centuries. It was originally used only to decorate the tables of the royal family. Fruit carving is a popular custom practiced during Songkran.

== History ==
Carving fruits and vegetables was a skill taught to women in the Thai royal palace.

One (now known to be apocryphal) legend holds that sometime before the Sukhothai era (Thai era from 1808 to 1824), a concubine named either Nang Nopphamat (Thai Peerage; Thai: นางนพมาศ) or Thao Srichulalak (another name of Thai peerage; Thai: ท้าวศรีจุฬาลักษณ์) wrote a book entitled Tamrap Thao Srichulaluk (Thai: ตำรับท้าวศรีจุฬาลักษณ์). The book discusses traditional Thai ceremonies, including the floating lantern festival called Phraratchaphithi Chongpriang Nai Wanphen Duean Sipsong (Thai: พระราชพิธีจองเปรียงในวันเพ็ญเดือนสิบสอง). Its protagonist wants to decorate a lantern more beautifully than other concubines, so she uses many kinds of flowers to decorate her lantern. Then she carved fruits into bird and swan shapes and placed them on the flower petals.

== Tools ==
Carvers use only one knife to carve fruit. Knives come in many varieties.

- Knife
  - Round handle Knife
  - Plane handle Knife
    - Crafting Knife
- Peeler
- Scoop
- Molding
- Scissor
- Cutting
- Water blow
- Plate for piece of waste fruit
- Napkin
- Food plastic cover
- Rubber gloves

== Types of fruit ==
Many types of fruits are used for carving. The two basic types are thick fruit and thin.

== See also ==
- Fruit carving
- Mukimono
- Vegetable carving
