= Mukimono =

Japanese art of decorative garnishing

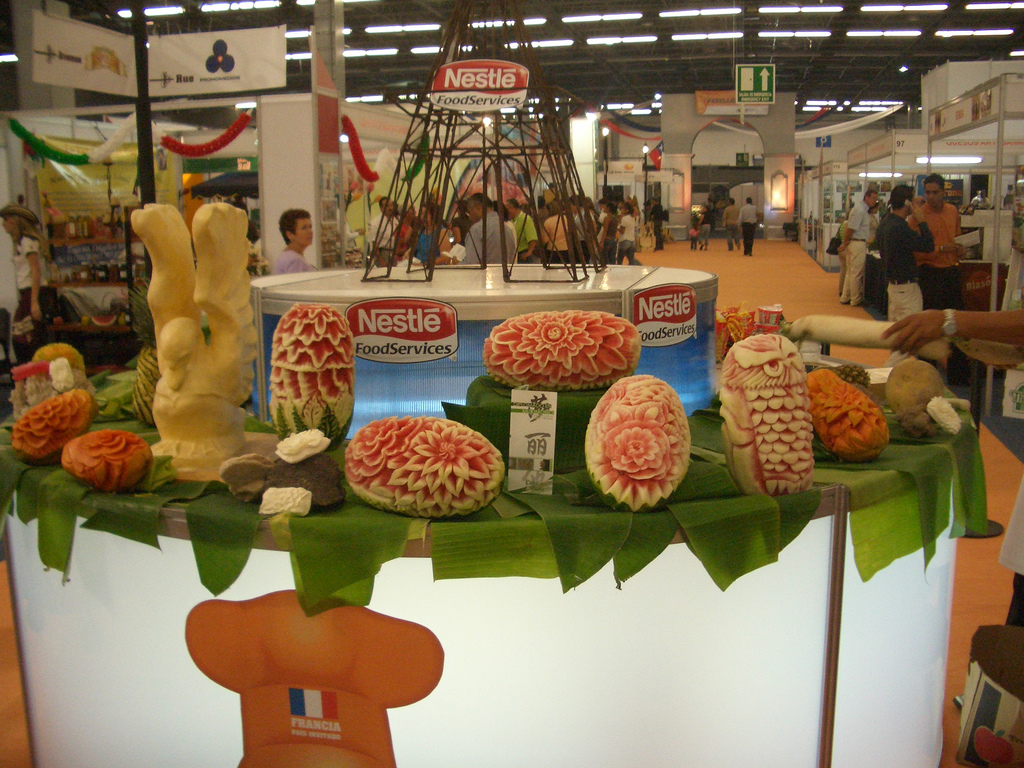
Mukimono

Mukimono (剥き物) is the traditional Japanese art of decorative garnishing. Examples of this include carving traditional images (flowers, cranes, turtles and dragons) into skins of fruits and vegetables, as well as carving vegetables (such as daikon, carrot, eggplant) into attractive shapes such as flowers, twists, and fan shapes. These are commonly served as a garnish on the same plate as the meal, or on a small side plate. Carving is done using a kitchen knife. Mukimono is different from Thai fruit carving, which uses a sharp thin knife specifically designed for this purpose.

== See also ==
- Vegetable carving
- Fruit carving
- Night of the Radishes
