= Thaeng yuak =

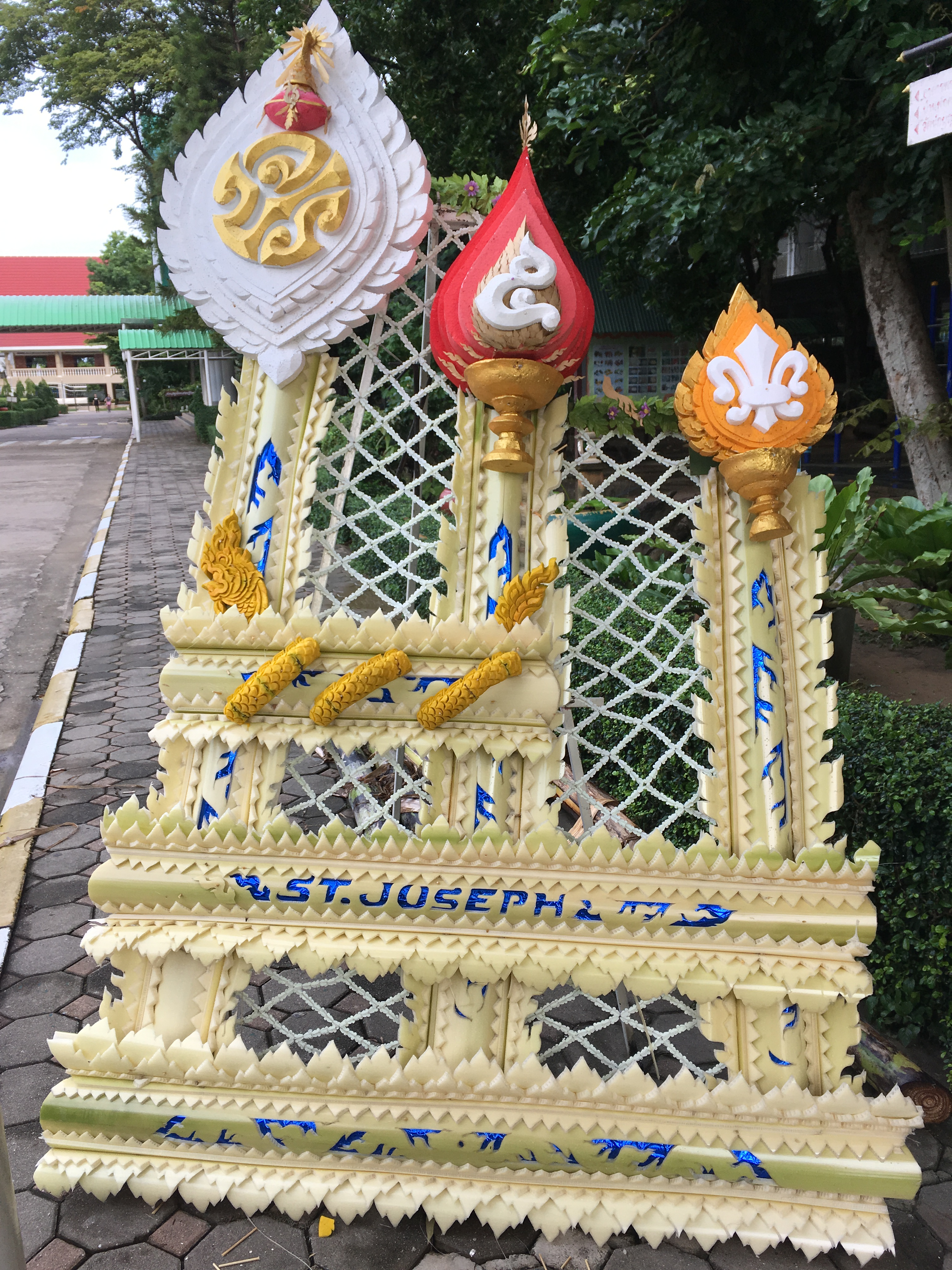
One side of bier that made by thaeng yuak

Thai banana stalk carving or thaeng yuak (แทงหยวก, from Tang meaning "stab" or "carving", and Yuak mean "Banana stalk") is the Thai local art of carving the banana stalk for temporary decoration in funerals and cultural events such as religious ceremonies and ordination ceremonies. It is categorized as the fresh material carving section in the main 10 Thai art skills (ช่างสิบหมู่) although the population of thaeng yuak artists is very low compared to other art skills sections.

Thaeng yuak is a carving art that was popular in the lower part of central Thailand such as Phetchaburi and Ayutthaya province but most information about thaeng yuak art has been saved in Phetchaburi community more than it has been in other provinces. The main purpose of Banana Stalk Carving is to decorate the bier and funeral area. Also, thaeng yuak is made by the very skillful artists and the people who want to respect the dead. In the other words, it is used for royal funerals, as well as those of well-known monks, remarkable people and important people. However, the popularity of thaeng yuak has reduced since the new culture has become more interesting to the youth.

== History ==
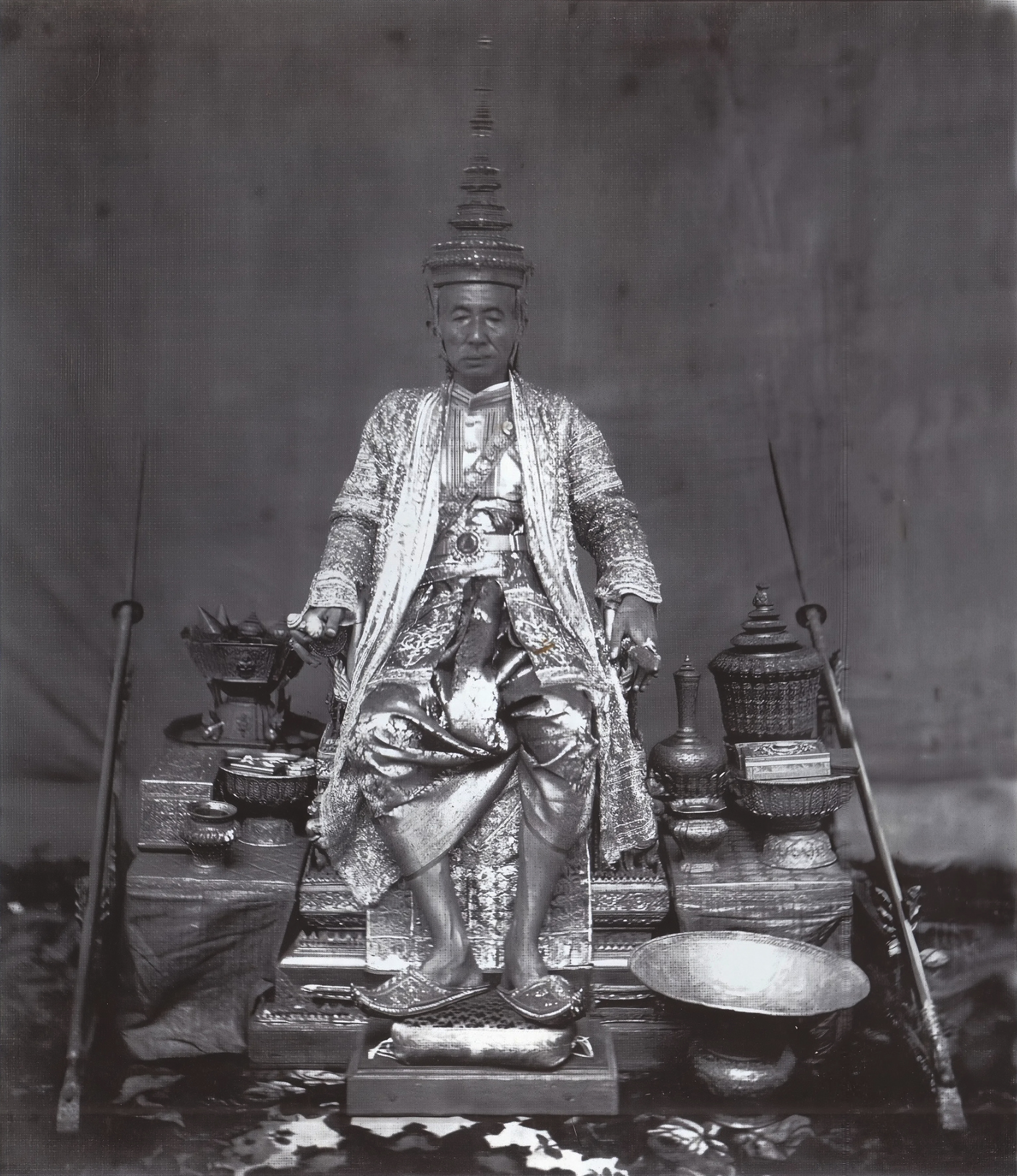
The portrait of King Rama IV, Mongkut

The history of thaeng yuak is still unclear because the date and the first province where thaeng yuak was invented are not recorded. There is a little information that could be used to estimate the timeline of it. Yet, the only information that could state the oldest period of thaeng yuak is the Thai poem name Khun Chang Khun Phaen. It is the epic poem that was written in the Ayutthaya period (in the middle of 17th century). In the Khun Chang Kun Phaen poem, thaeng yuak is mentioned in the Funeral of Wan Tong chapter when Khun Phaen ( the main character) decided to arrange the formal funeral for Wan Tong, one of his lovers.

Furthermore, in the 19th century, thaeng yuak art was a very common carving art in many provinces. There is a record that said almost every high monk in Phetchaburi can perform thaeng yuak art which it would be used for Buddhist festivals. More importantly, the important property of a banana stalk is fire resistant:. Banana is the plant that has volume of water inside the vessel, therefore people in the past discovered it and used it to protect the bier from the fire. This knowledge has passed through generations and becomes an art at the end.

Moreover, thaeng yuak was meant to add more attractive elements to the funeral state, the shelter and also decorate the stand for a bier, called "Mae Ru". Mae Ru is a decorated stand or a shelter for the bier usually used in important or high class funerals. Therefore, it is very difficult to has Mea Ru in other city rather than in capital city. However, Mea Ru is very popular in countryside like Phetchaburi and became the tradition of the city. The Mea Ru of Phetchaburi is unique. The reason is It is made in the same scale as high class Mea Ru, and it will be decorated with thaeng yuak. In addition, the bier is decorated by thaeng yuak on the edge and corners. Because of its beauty and delicate carving, King Rama IV (1851 A.D - 1868 A.D) decided to established thaeng yuak as the treasure of country.

Unfortunately, in the past, the book or picture of this art was very hard to find in public. To be more specific, the master of thaeng yuak usually kept their technique only for their students and taught them by experience and did some workshop rather than a book. Therefore, there are many missing pieces of evidence and timeline in thaeng yuak history. However, new generations of thaeng yuak artists have begun to share their knowledge with the public more in order to preserve the culture and art. The master of thaeng yuak also supports these new artists by giving them the guiding and original technique which able to fill the gap of thaeng yuak timeline.

== Tool and Equipment ==
The essential tools for thaeng yuak are the sharp carving knives, hammer, and nail. For carving knives, each type of knife will do the different job and have different properties for the work.

1. Thaeng yuak knife (มีดแทงหยวก)– the knife blade is 5 inches to 6 inches long with a round sharp point. It is flexible and has a round handle. The blade is able to bend and create a smooth curve. Importantly, the knife must be always sharp otherwise the cutting line wouldn’t smooth and look messy.

2. lae laai Knife (มีดแรลาย) – It has a short blade with the colour which is used to paint the line to make it more visible.

3. Saw and Cable cutter – to cut the banana tree

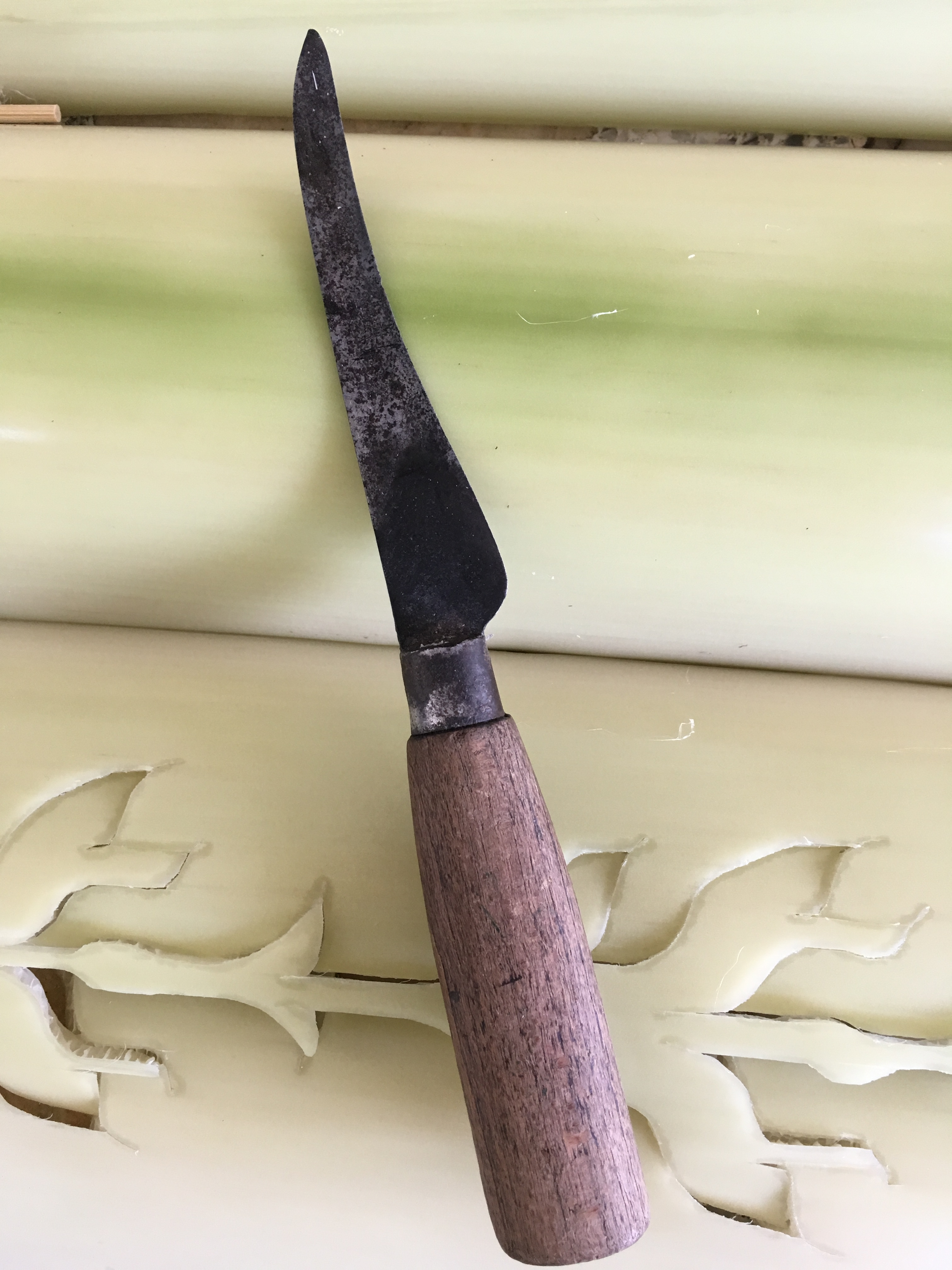
Thaeng yuak knife

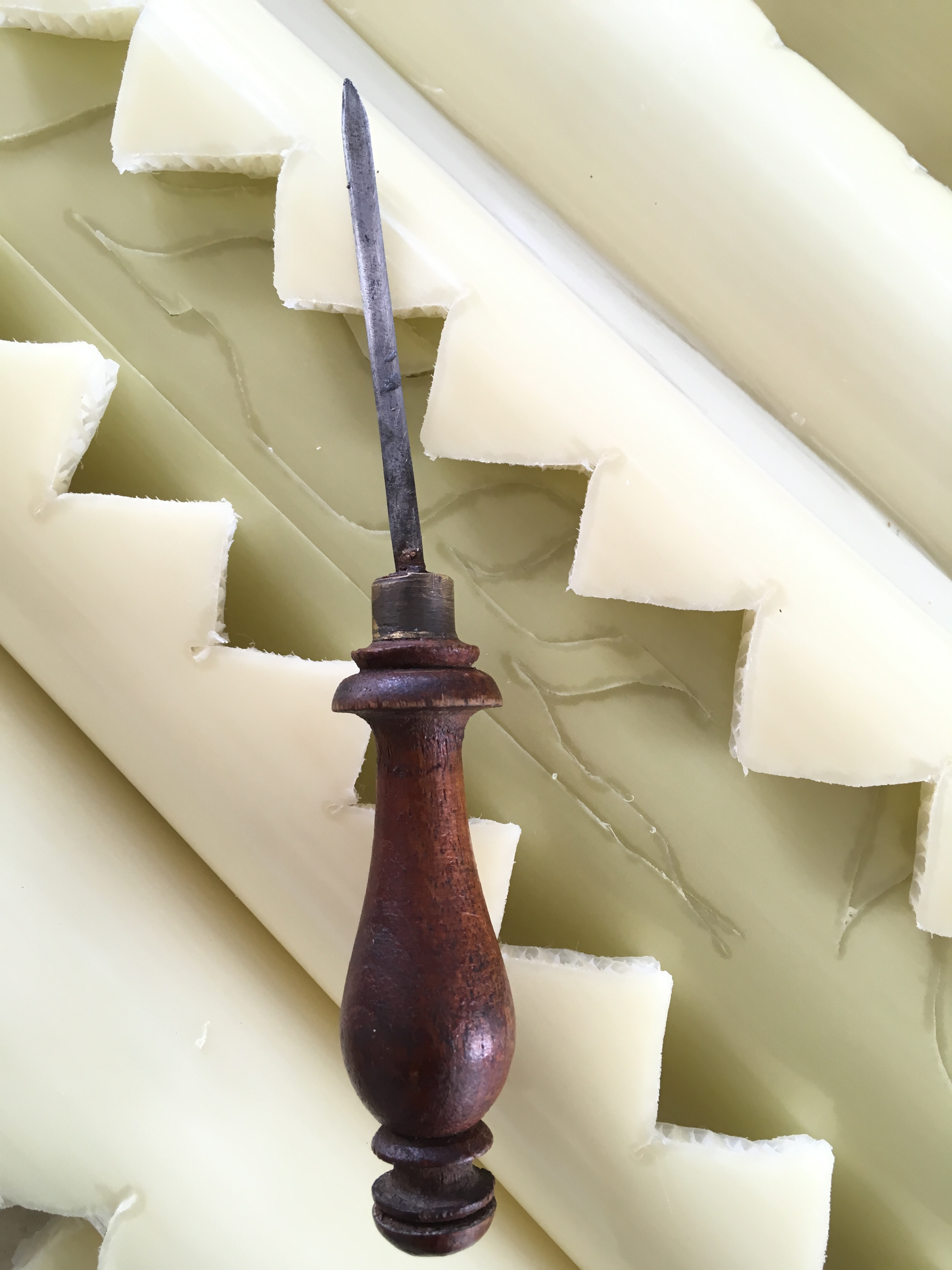
Lae Laai knife

Essential equipment for thaeng yuak, there are 4 items

1. Banana stalk – The suitable banana stalk should come from the adult banana tree with 3 meters tall and the tree must does not have banana blossom yet. The diameter should be around 20 centimeters. Also, the artist should use a Tania banana tree because it is durable to the weather and long lasting compared to the others (for the Tania banana tree, it will take about 24 hours to be rotten, a normal banana tree will take about 10 hours to be rotten).

2. Colored aluminium foil paper – Using the property of glitter, it will make the pattern look more dominant, and the colour being much more long lasting. Moreover, the paper is water resistant.

3. Food colour – Usually red, blue and yellow

4. ฺBamboo strips – It is used to bind the banana stalks together or with the object. The approximate length is 60 centimeters and 1 to 1.5 centimeters for the width.

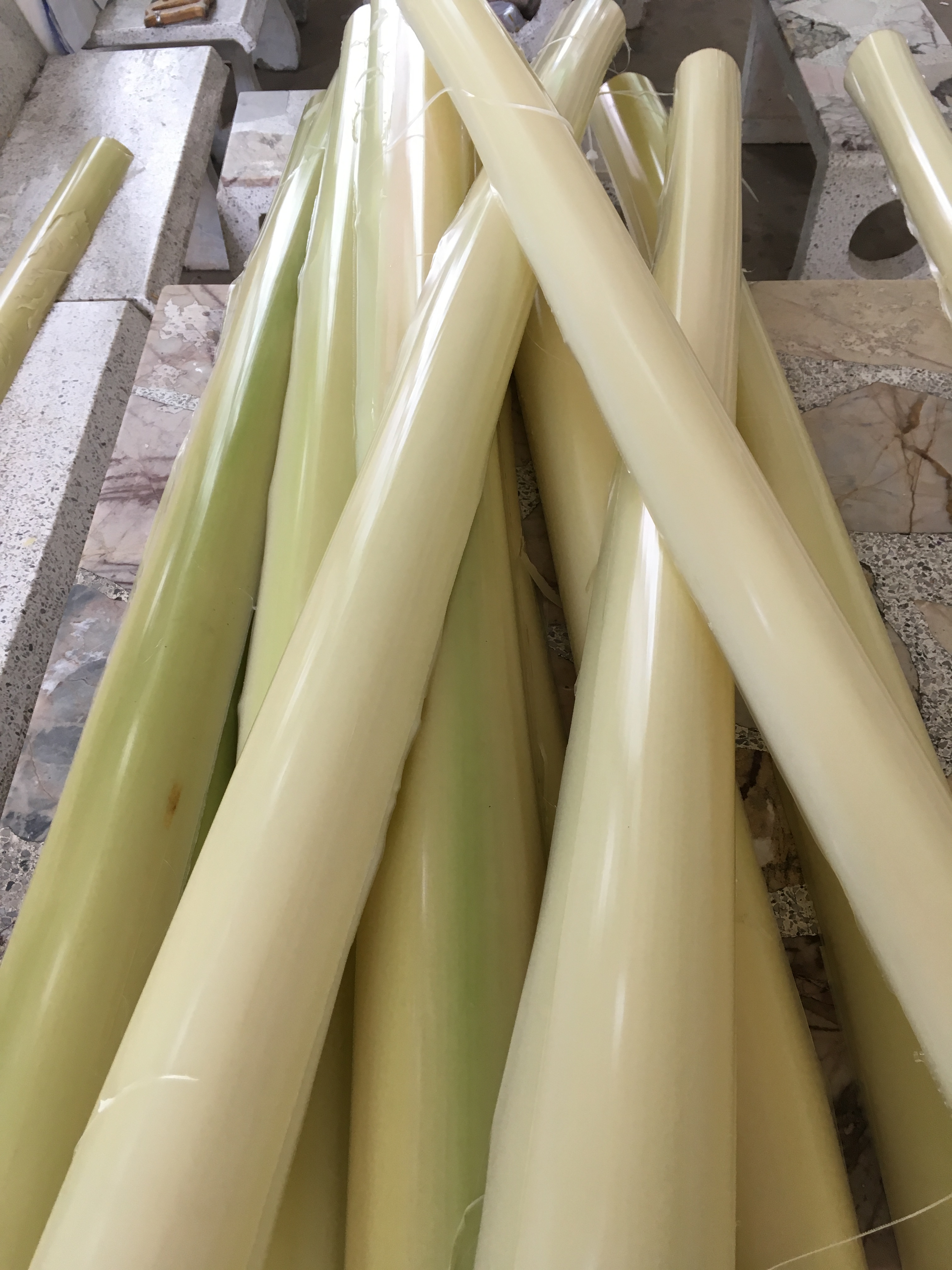
Banana stalk

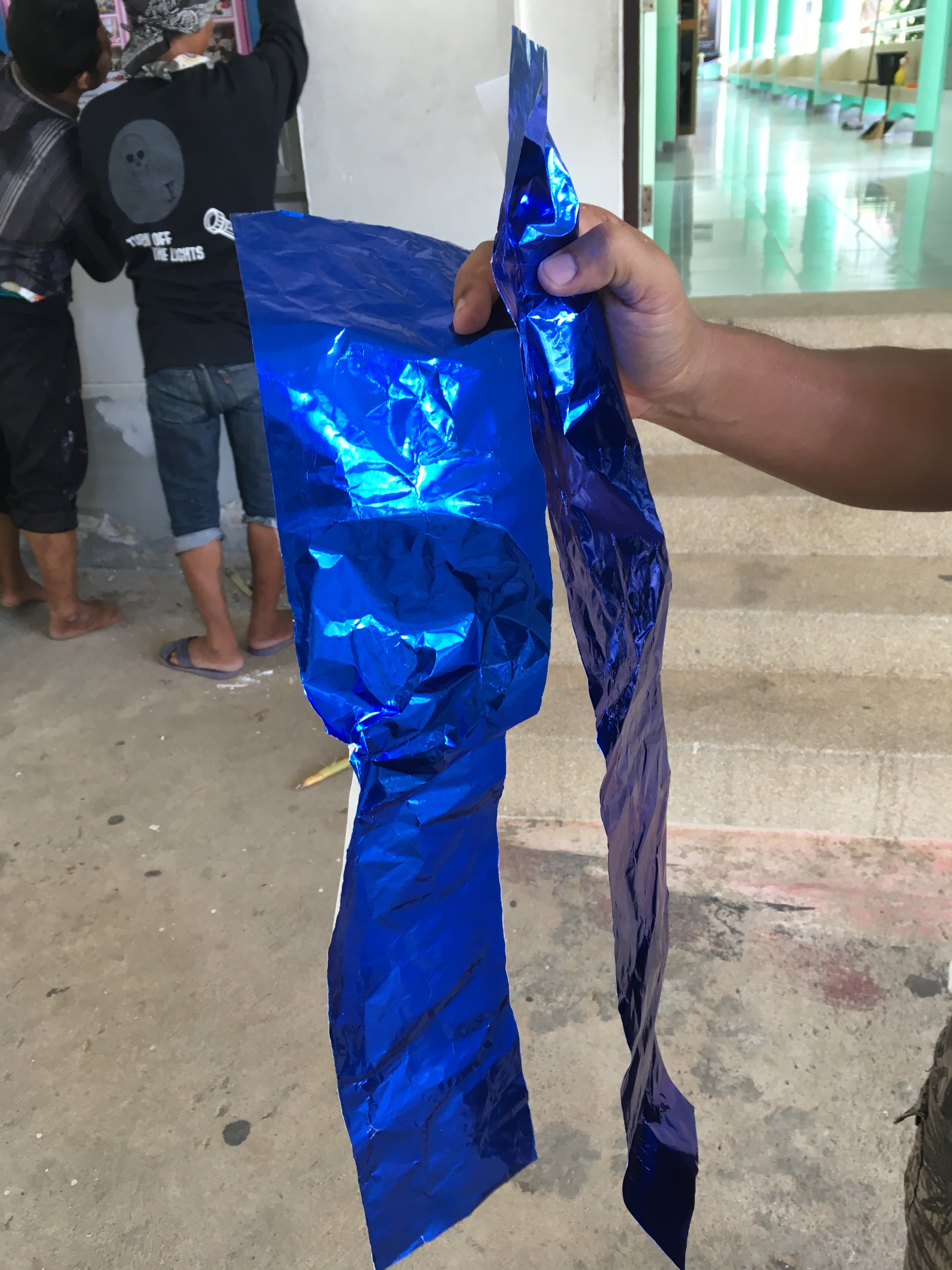
Blue Aluminium foil

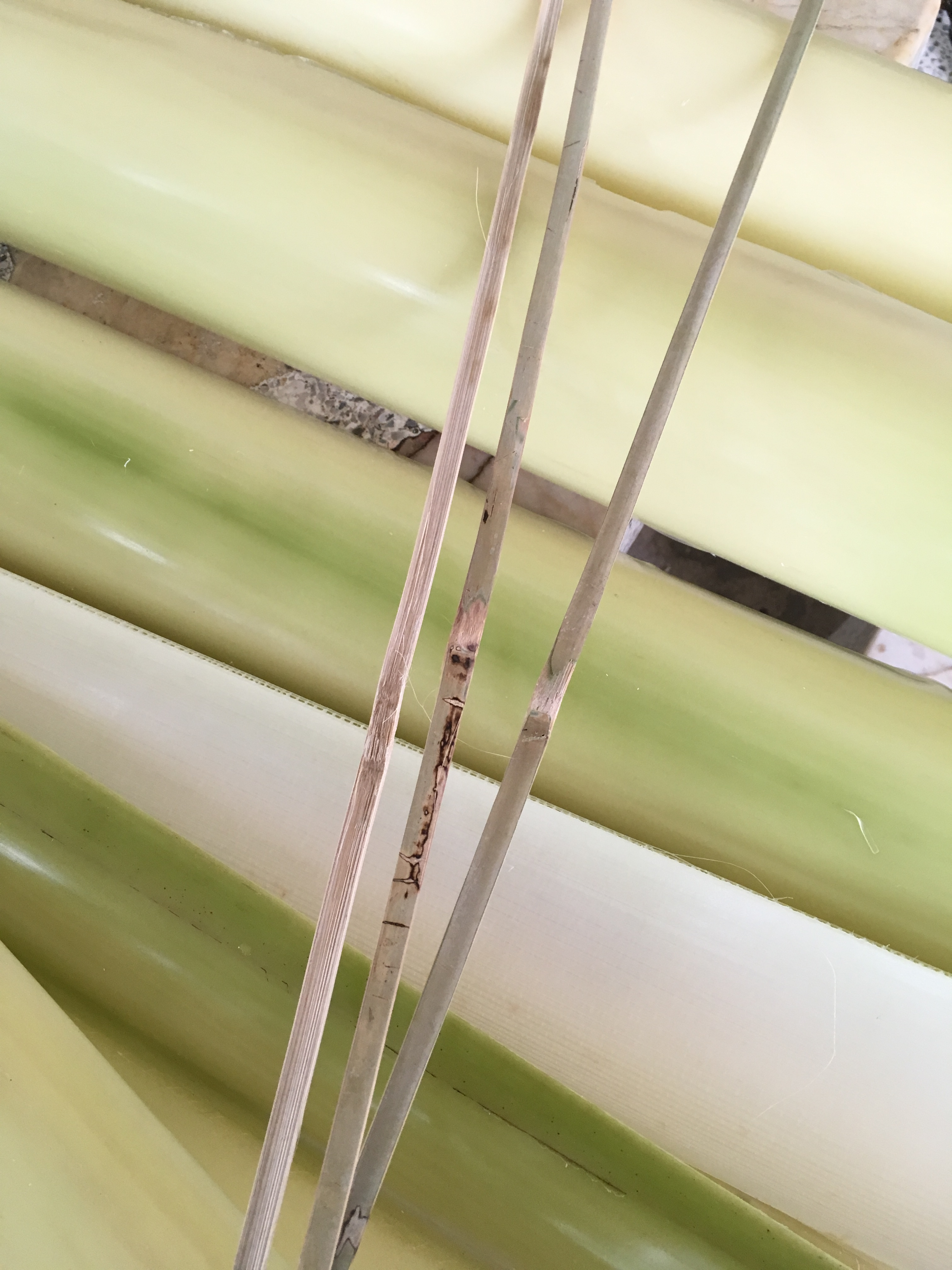
Bamboo strips used to bind banana stalks together

== Pattern styles ==
Because thaeng yuak is the art that bonds with the daily life of people and used it in many religious festivals and becomes the culture of local people. The art has been influenced by the lifestyle of people and creates their own unique pattern. The pattern styles are based on the ideal of beauty in Thai art such as Kranok pattern (ลายกระหนก). Some patterns has lost by the change of new lifestyle but the others have been saved by the tradition and some new generations. Therefore, the old pattern will be saved and survive through the time. They are similar to Thai traditional style such as Kra nok pattern but the detail is not as rich as the normal pattern. Thaeng yuak is the art that uses fresh plants as the material, therefore it must be done in a day before it would rot. There are 7 main patterns for thaeng yuak:

1) 1st Herringbone pattern or "Fun Nung pattern (ลายฟันหนึ่ง)"in Thai (Fun or ฟัน in this case, it means herringbone, Nung or หนึ่ง means one or the first ) – it is the basic beginner pattern

2) 3rd Herringbone pattern or "Fun Sarm pattern (ลายฟันสาม)" in Thai (Sarm or สาม mean three or the third) – very common pattern for all thaeng yuak artists

3) 5th Herringbone pattern or "Fun Ha pattern (ลายฟันห้า)" in Thai (Ha or ห้า mean five or the fifth) – the pattern is bigger than the 3rd Herringbone pattern which makes it can’t split into two equal pieces, therefore it will have some decoration instead.

A) The Mixing pattern - the 1st, 3rd, and 5th Herringbone patterns can be combined together to create 2 layers of patterns but they usually combine only 2 styles together. For example, 1st and 3rd Herringbone patterns, the 1st Herringbone will be the first layer and then place 3rd Herringbone at the back. Or 5th Herringbone combine together which they will create the 2 layers of 5th Herringbone pattern.

4) Tiger calf pattern ( "ลายน่องสิงห์", Nong Sing pattern, น่อง or Nong means calf and สิงห์ or Sing means tiger ) is the basic pattern used on the pole or edge of a bier or Mea ru.

5) Na Kra Darn pattern (ลายหน้ากระดาน) or front board pattern (ลายหน้ากระดาน, หน้า means front and กระดาน means board) is the pattern used on top, middle and floor areas of a bier.

6) Sao pattern (ลายเสา) or pole pattern (ลายเสา,เสา mean pole) is a very important pattern for every thaeng yuak artist. This pattern is the freestyle area where artists can design it by themselves. The pattern can be any shape or picture depending on the maker.

7) Kra Jung pattern (ลายกระจัง) is the extra part, it is used to decorate 1st herringbone and 3rd herringbone pattern but it is usually on top and middle part of a bier because the pattern is pointing downward.

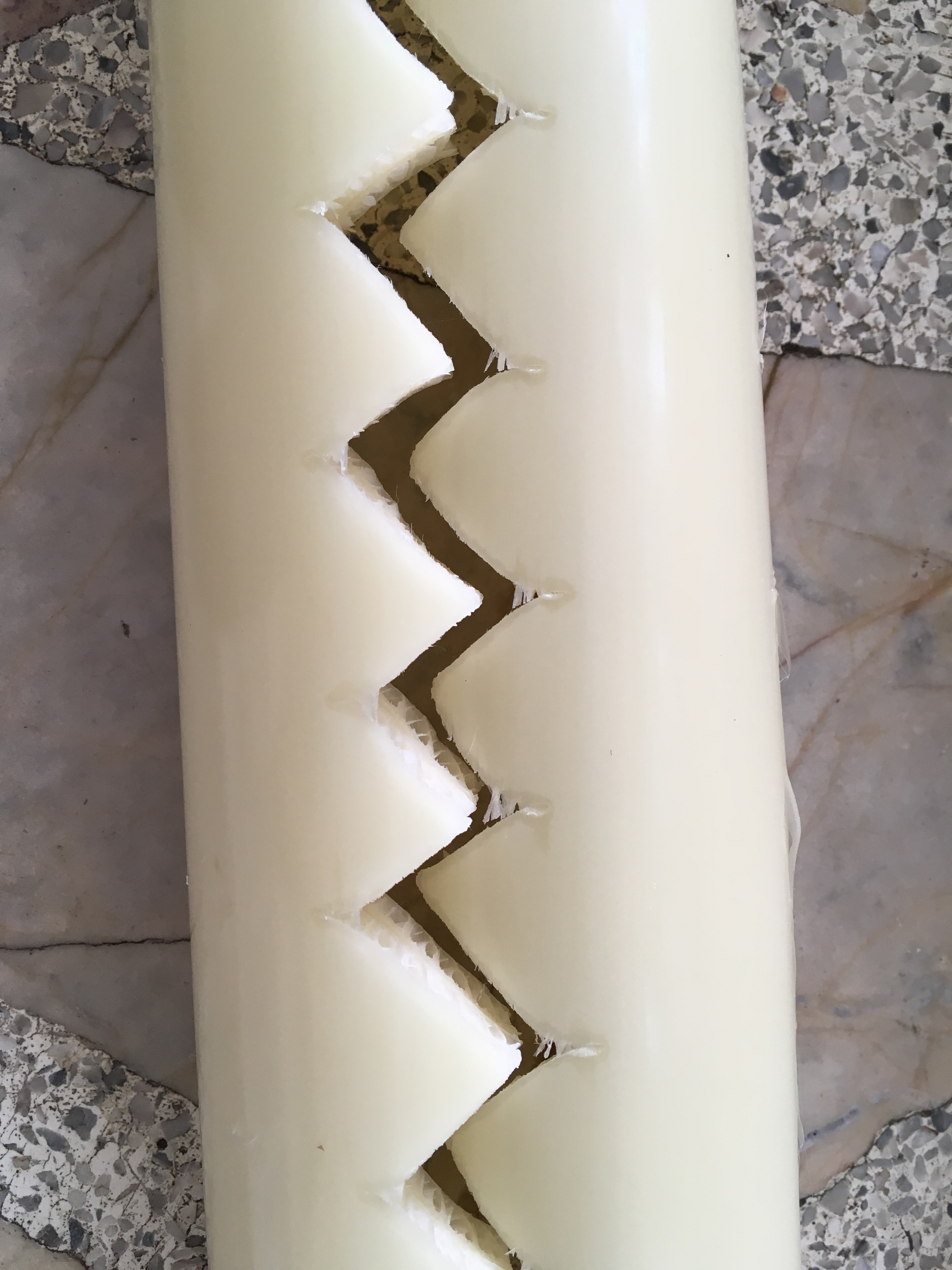
The 1st herringbone pattern

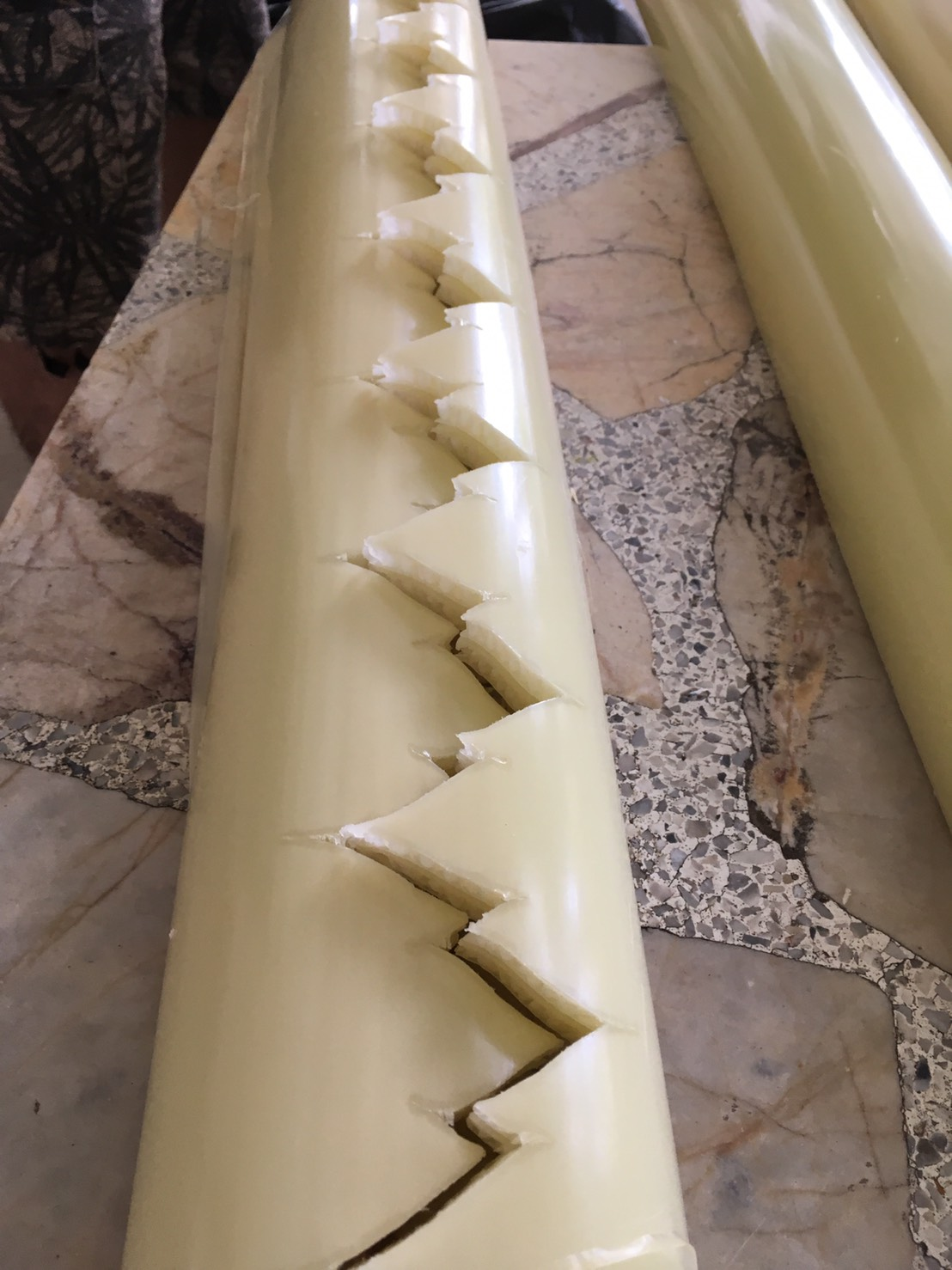
The 3rd herringbone pattern

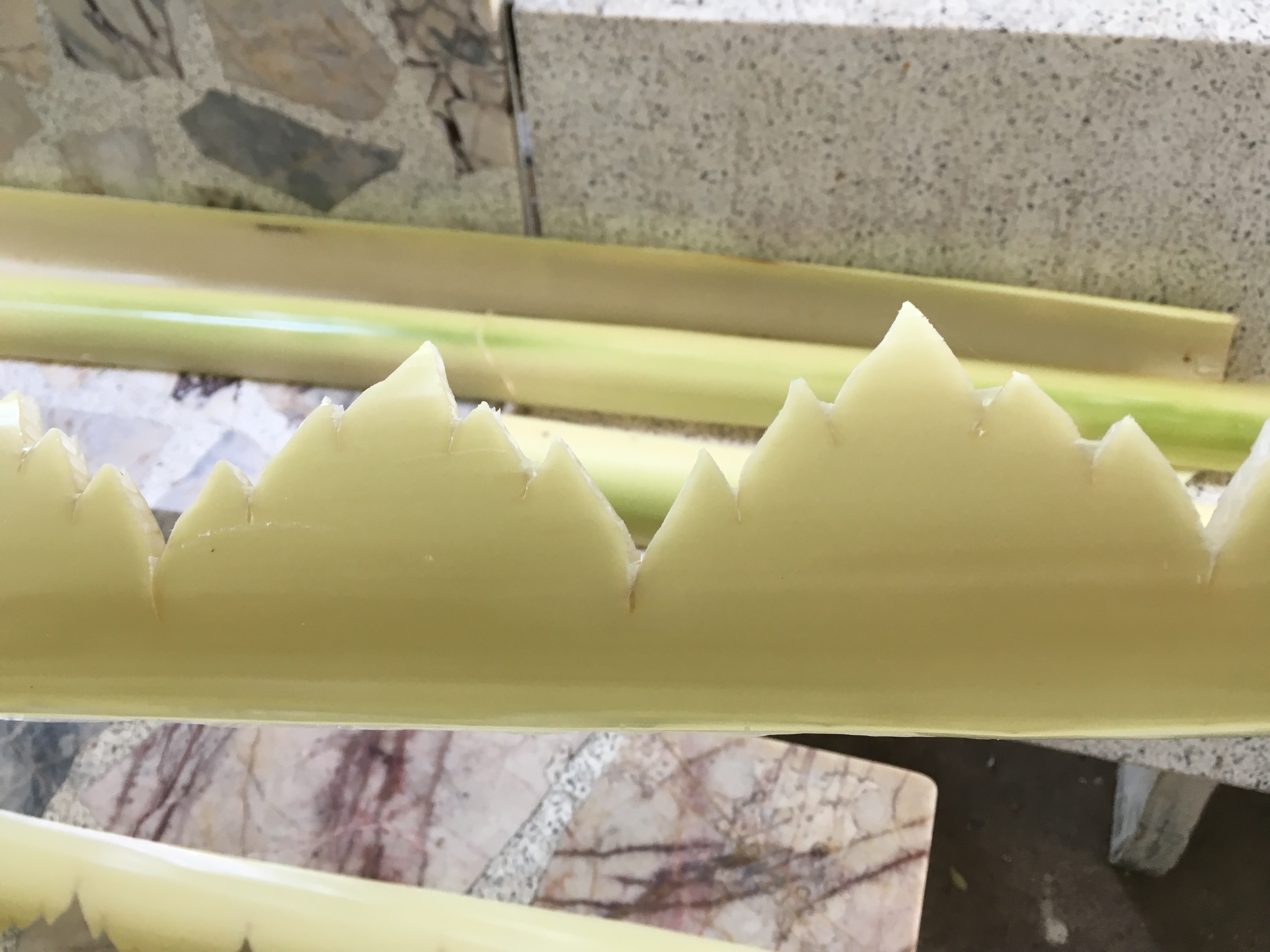
The 5th herringbone pattern

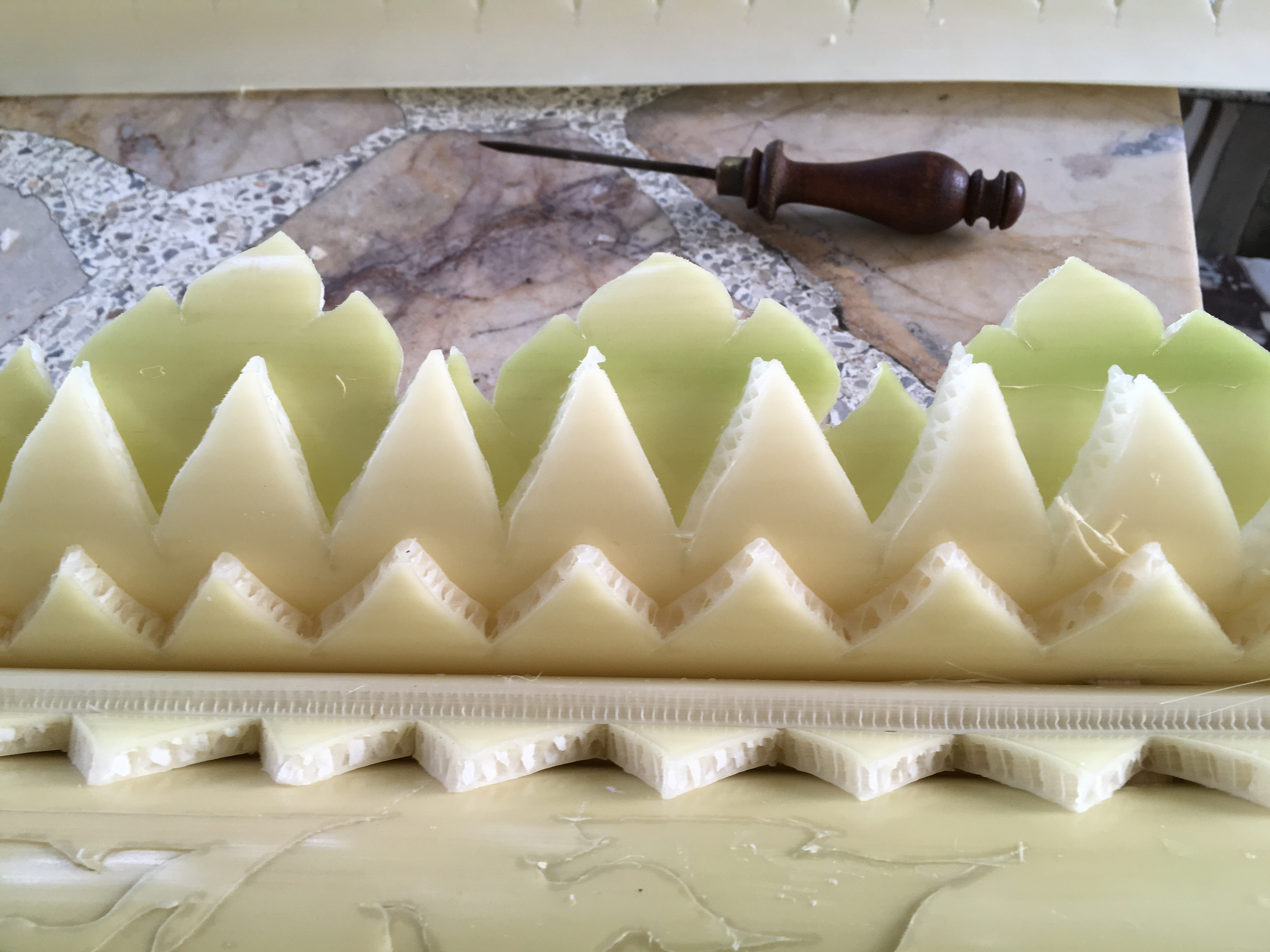
The combination of patterns

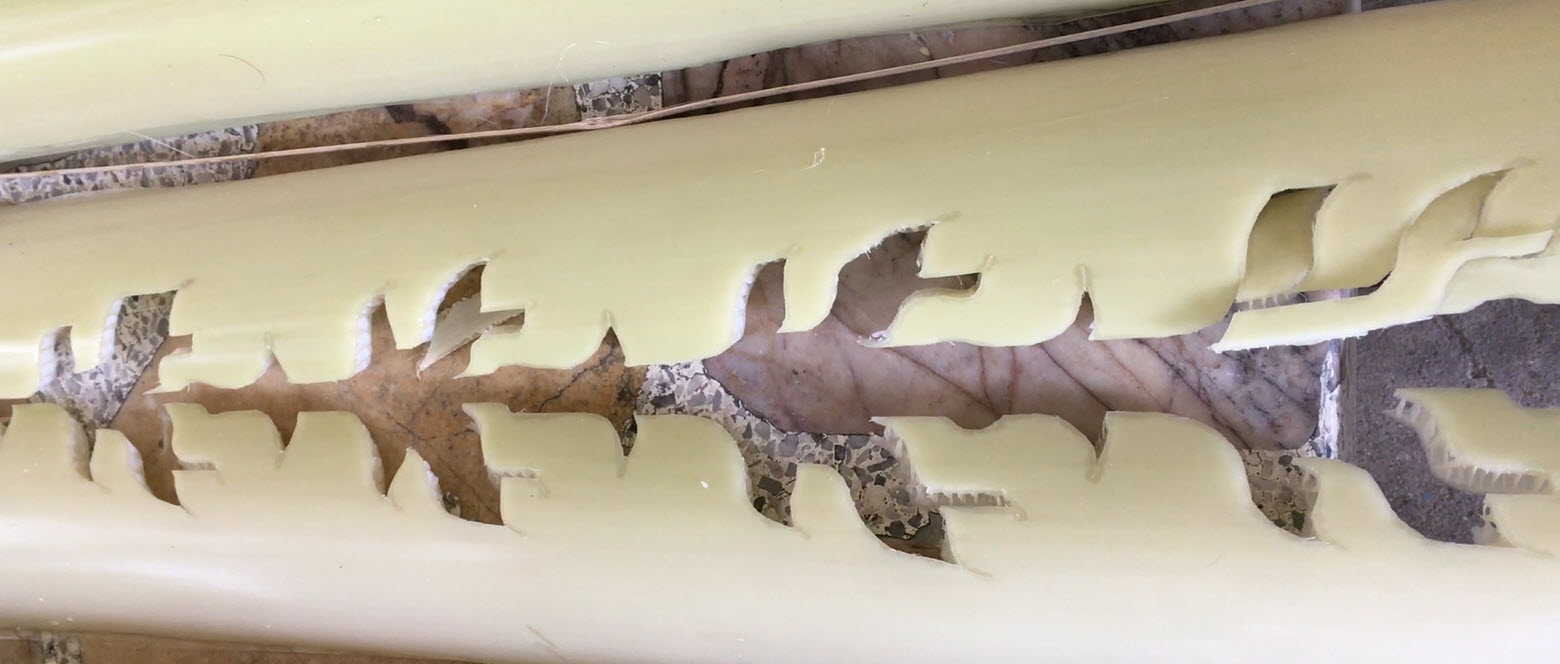
Tiger Calf pattern

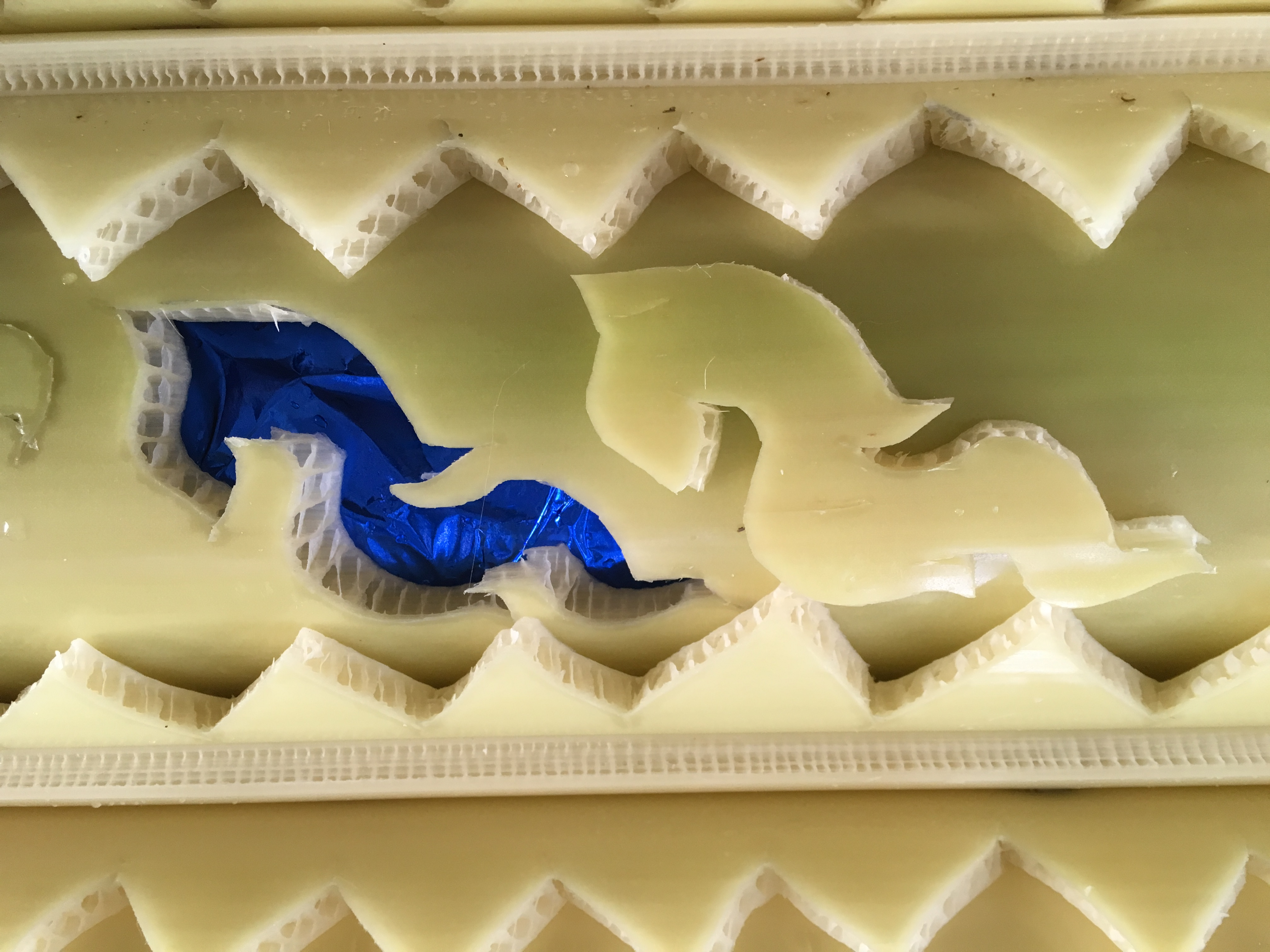
Banana stalk carving

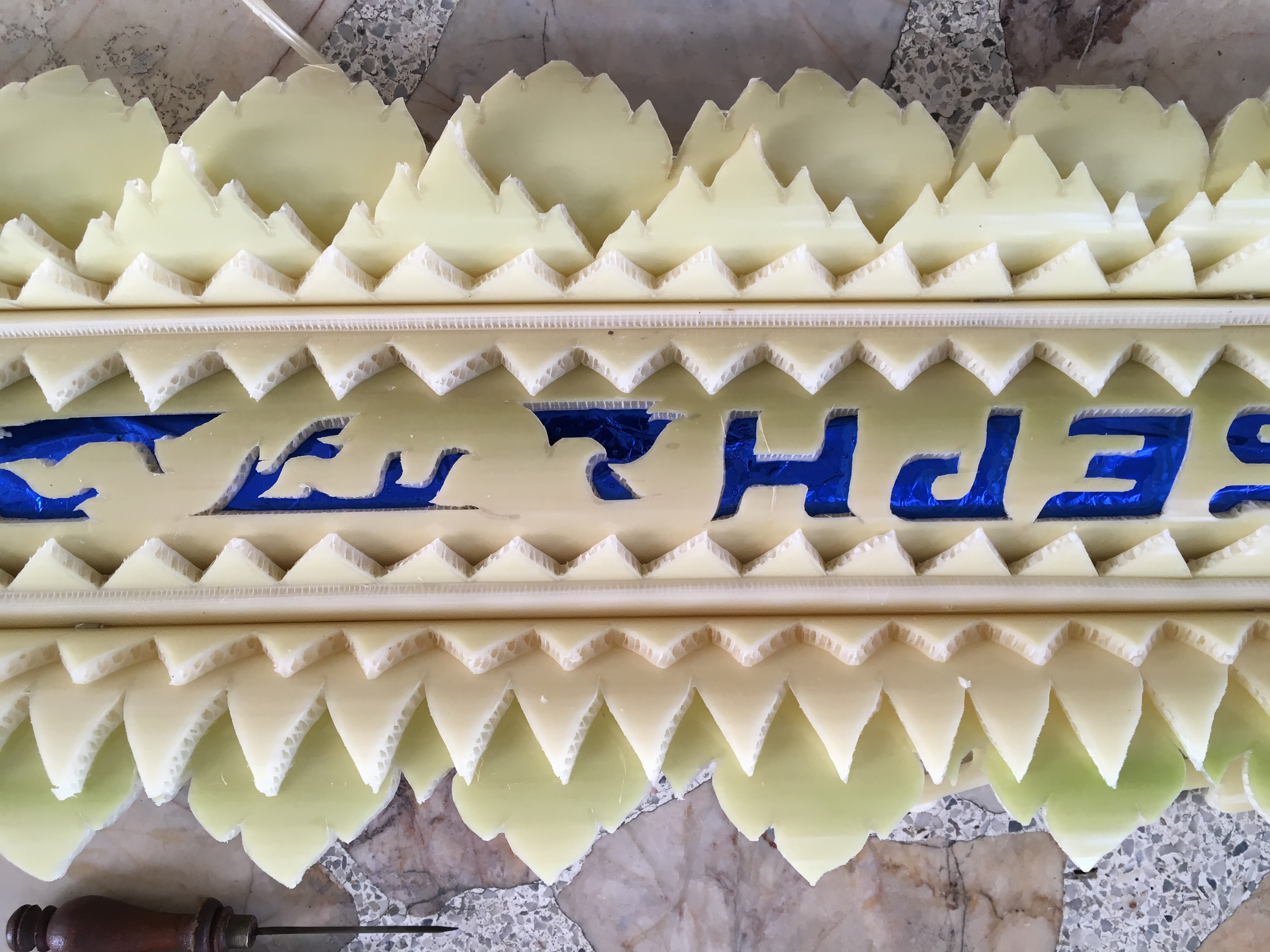
Sao pattern

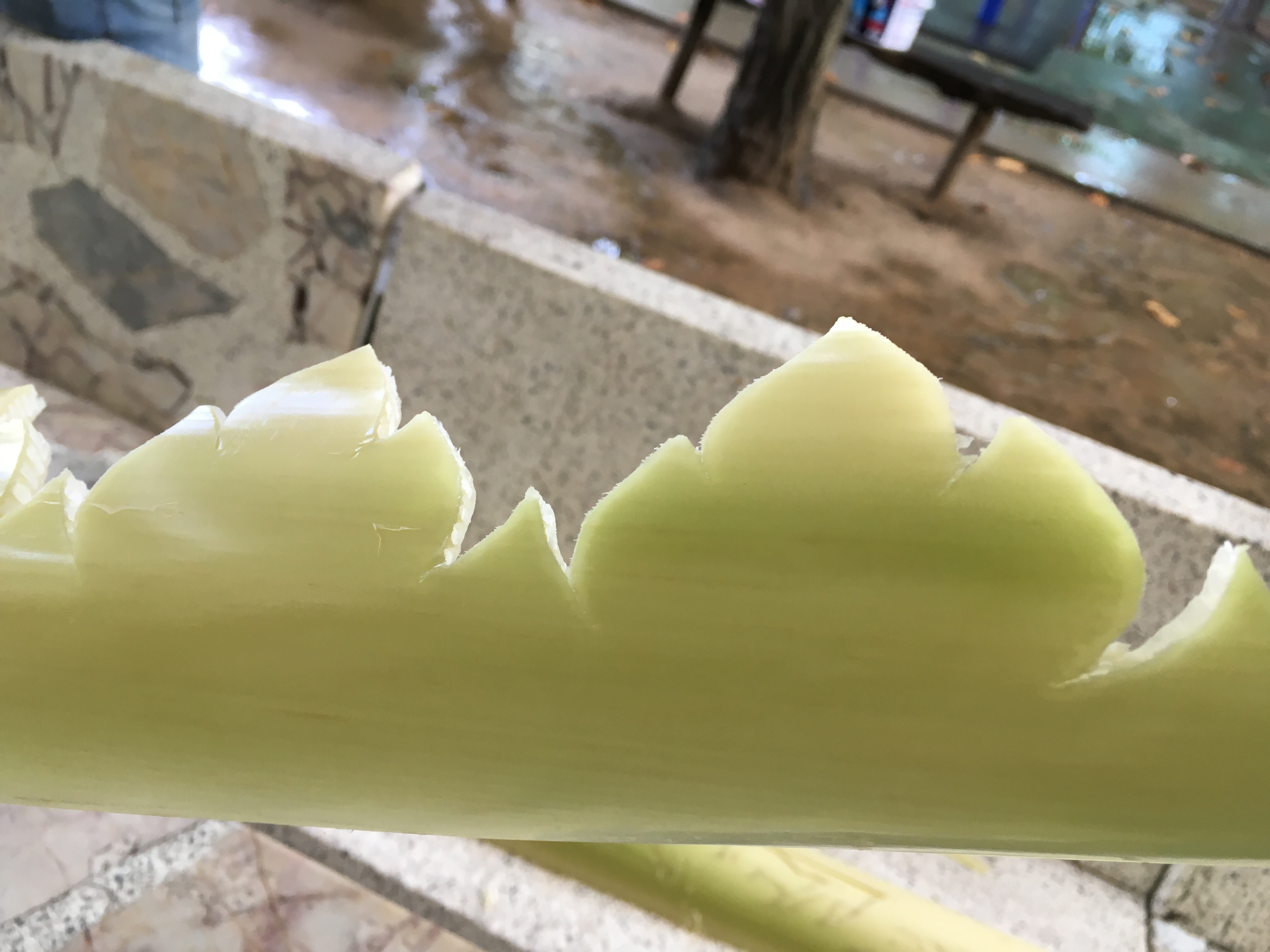
Kra jung pattern

== Procedure ==
Thaeng yuak is an art that needs:

- precision
- fast processing
- time management

Thaeng yuak is all about the time limit that forces the maker to eliminate unnecessary methods and reduce the detail of patterns and yet still looks beautiful. The procedure of making banana stalk carvings has only 4 steps which are

1. Carving the 1st herringbone pattern

2. Carving 3rd and 5th herringbone pattern on banana stalks

3. Carving Na Kra Darn pattern and Sao pattern on the other banana stalks

4. (Lae laai step) Colouring the inner surface by using Lae laai knife with the colour and gently carving the surface (after carving the herringbone pattern).

== See also ==
- Vegetable carving
- Fruit carving
- Thai art
