= Gourd art =

Artistic works made with hard-shell gourds

Gourd art featuring a tiger

Gourd art involves creating works of art using Lagenaria spp. hard-shell gourds as an art medium. Gourd surfaces may be carved, painted, sanded, burned, dyed, and polished. Typically, a harvested gourd is left to dry over a period of months before the woody surface is suitable for decorating.

Gourd decoration, including pyrography, is an ancient tradition in Africa and Asia as well as among the indigenous peoples of the Americas, notably the central highland people of Peru, the Navajo, Hopi and Pueblo nations of the American Southwest, and the Nuxálk and Haida nations of British Columbia. Gourd crafting and painting has evolved from early hand carvings to the modern day use, by some, of electric wood burners and high-speed pen-shaped rotary tools that can be used to inscribe almost any design.

A wide variety of gourd shapes and sizes yields an array of art pieces, including: ornaments, bowls, sculpture, vases, and wall art such as masks. Artistic styles can range from craft to fine art. Perhaps the most prolific and successful gourd artist in the United States is Robert Rivera of New Mexico.

The American Gourd Society, headquartered in Kokomo, Indiana, was founded in 1937 and publishes its own magazine. The Canadian Gourd Society was formed in 1999 and is located in Kitchener, Ontario. Both are national nonprofit organizations dedicated to the education and instruction of those interested in gourd history, cultivation, painting, crafts, and participating in competitions. Gourd Art shows and festivals occur in many places throughout North America, the oldest running festival was founded in North Carolina in 1942. In recent years, Internet technology has considerably broadened exposure to the art form which in turn has helped generate a marked increase in the number of participants. In North America, gourd art has been the subject of specialty television programs such as The Carol Duvall Show on Home & Garden Television. No longer considered just a craft, gourd art is being elevated to the point where it has been featured in a number of galleries and magazines and exhibited at the United States Botanic Garden in Washington, D.C.

In 2003, gourd artists from the United States, Australia, and Canada got together to create the world's first Gourdpatch quilt. Each artist brought their particular artistic style to a flat 4" × 4" gourd tile which was stitched together to create a quilt.

== History ==
At the time of the Ottoman attacks on Croatian regions, more precisely in the period from the end of the 15th to the end of the 17th century, the Ottomans brought to Croatia many plants that are still popular today, such as cherries, watermelons, melons, quinces, some types of apples and squash, which in some Slavonian villages they are also called Turkish women.

The oldest carp squash in Croatia was mentioned in the Osijek Zbornik in 1956: it is a squash from 1734 (the year is engraved on the squash, but it is not known where the carp is). In the years between the First and Second World War, Tuna Mikinac-Gabrin, Franja Kovačević-Ilišev, Marica Kovačević-Ružička, Antun Blaževac-Salerov, Iva Kadić-Sojdan, Šima Dretvić and Andrija and Franja Ivkovac are mentioned as excellent gourd carvers in various ethnological contributions. Specimens of their gourds can be found in various museums, and the largest number are in the Ethnographic Museum in Zagreb.

In the past, gourd painting was much more widespread in the area of the former Slavonian Military Border, especially in Bošnjaci, Drenovci, Babina Greda, Gradište, Soljani, Cerna, Štitar and Račinovci. In the mentioned places, pumpkin painting was not always equally intense: the number of painters changed or only a few stood out for their skill. Today, this art in its original form is mostly preserved in Gradište.

Ilija Dretvić-Filakov, folk writer and storyteller, was the most famous and prolific pumpkin painter in Gradište, a village where pumpkin painting was nurtured in the families of Franja and Đula Dretvić, Kate Žigmundovac, Ivan Ivanšić-Martino, Ruža Mikulić, Marko Kadić and Marko Nikolić. It is still cultivated today in the families of Marica Stojanović, Ivan Jovanovac-Jerkovi and Đura Jovanovac-Jerkovi, and Marica and Kate Nikolić, and one of the youngest painters in the city and promoter of this traditional art is Vinko Babić, whose colorful gourds are as a special gift in 2016, it was also given to the Japanese emperor Akishino.

== Worldwide examples ==
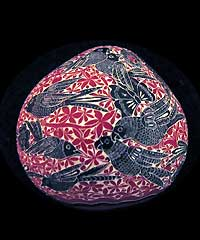
Birds of Peru in a fruit tree, by Ivonne Alfaro-Nùñez and Cristian Alfaro-Nùñez of Cochas, Peru. This gourd is three inches tall.

Gourd art by Nurettin Taskaya

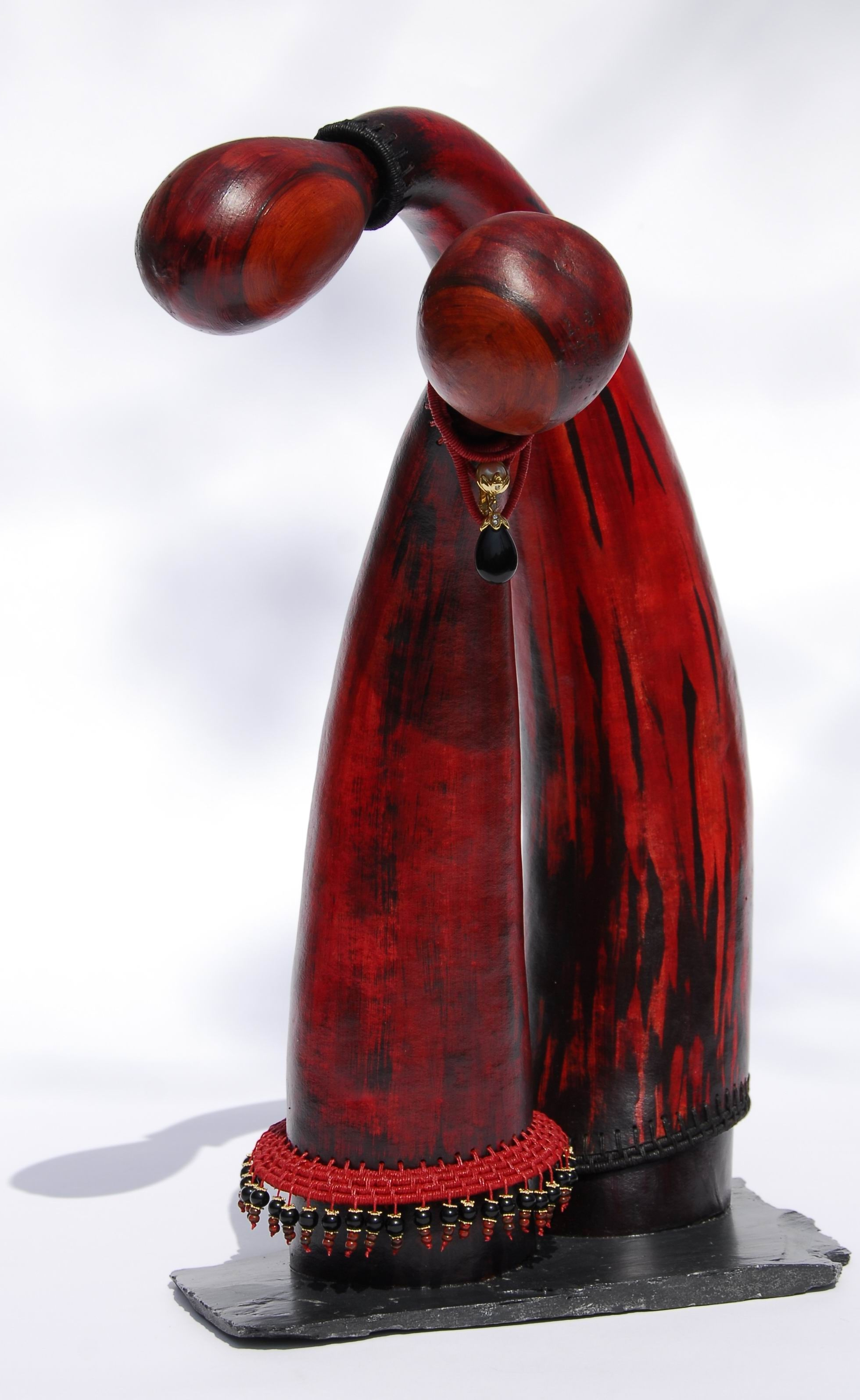
Gourd art by France Benoit

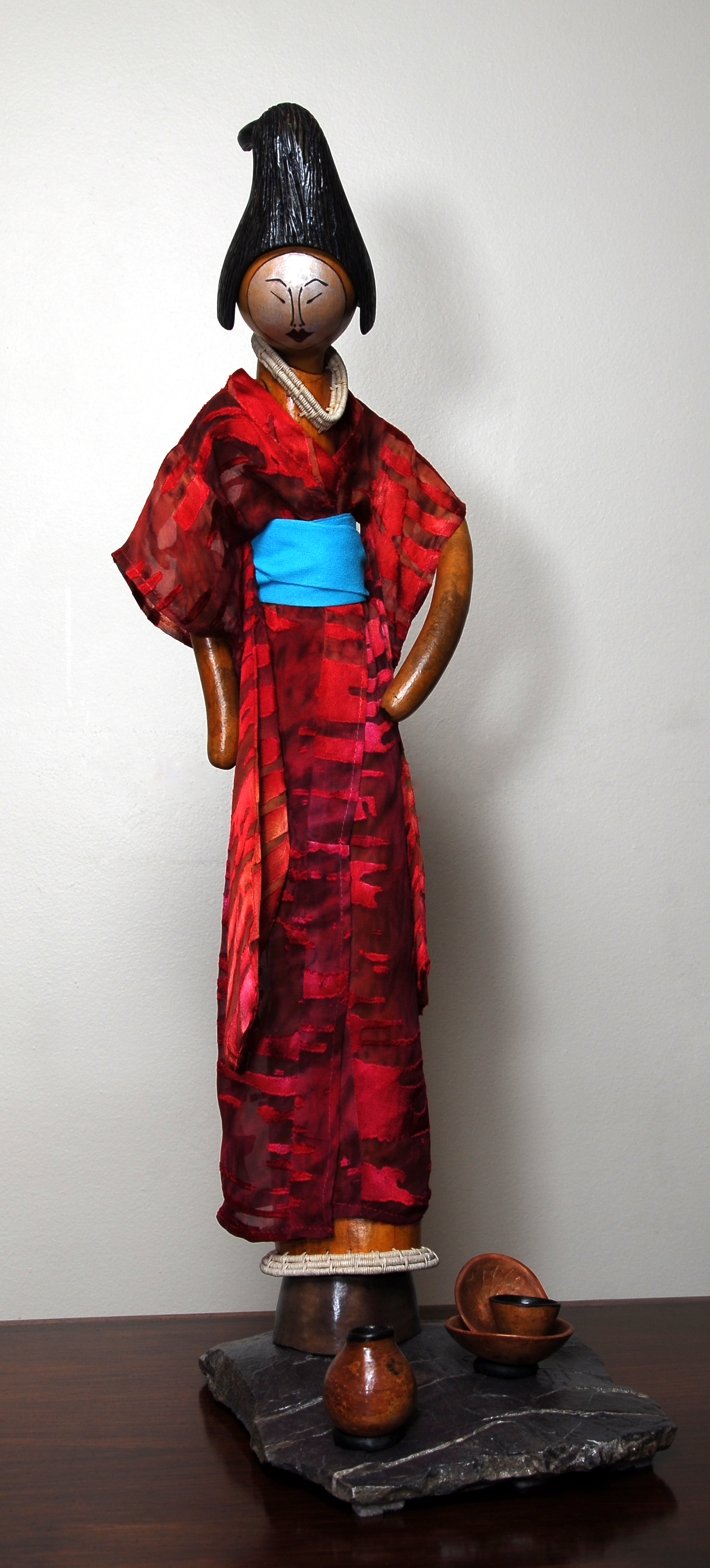
Gourd art by France Benoit and Anne Simard

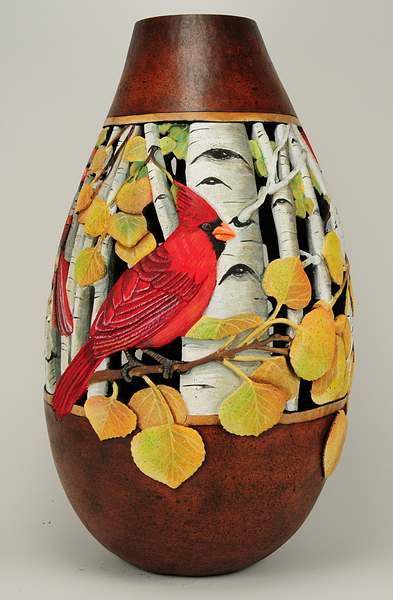
CardinalAspens - Gourd Art by Bonnie Gibson of Arizona

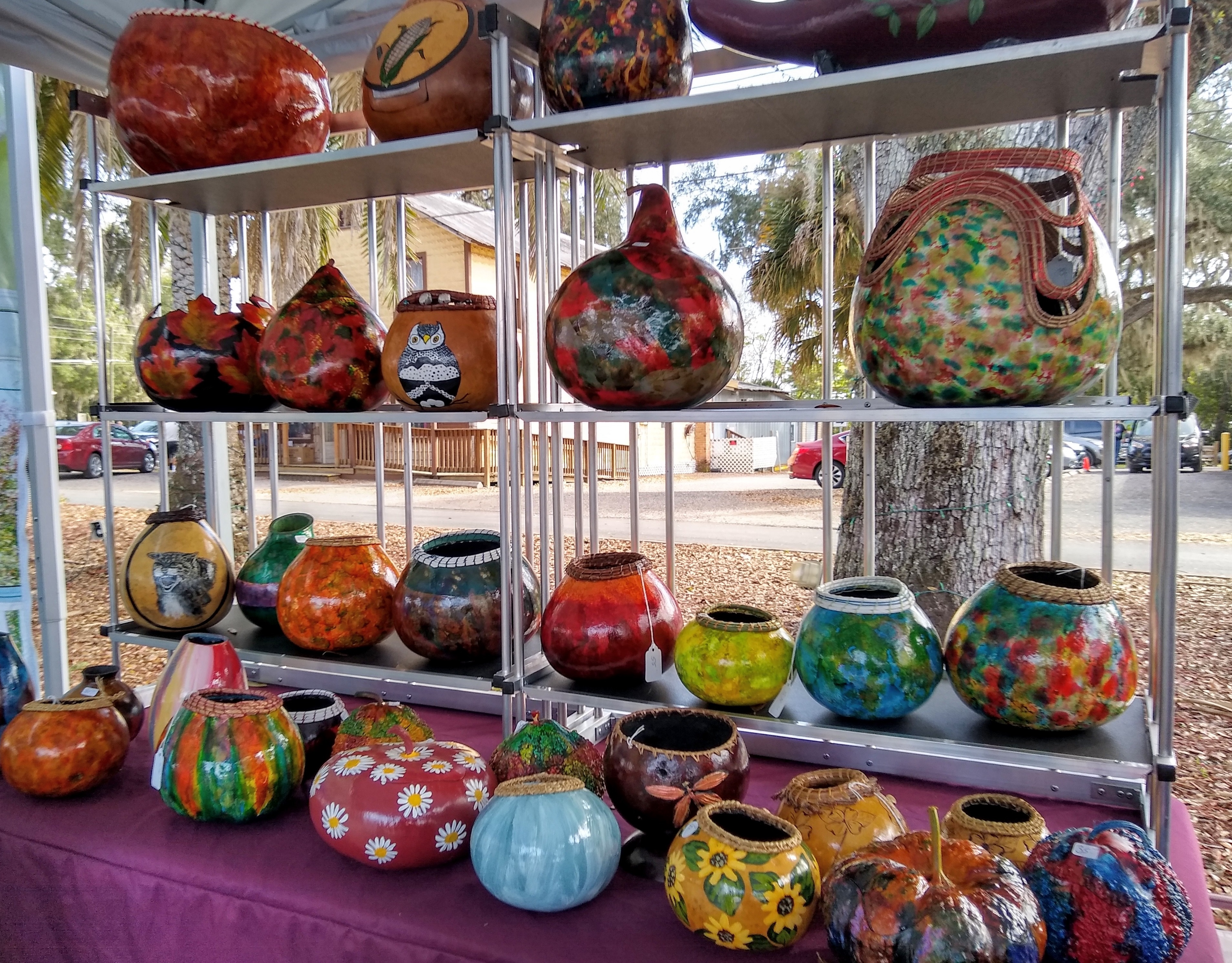
Selection of gourd art by Susan Davis from Sylva, North Carolina.

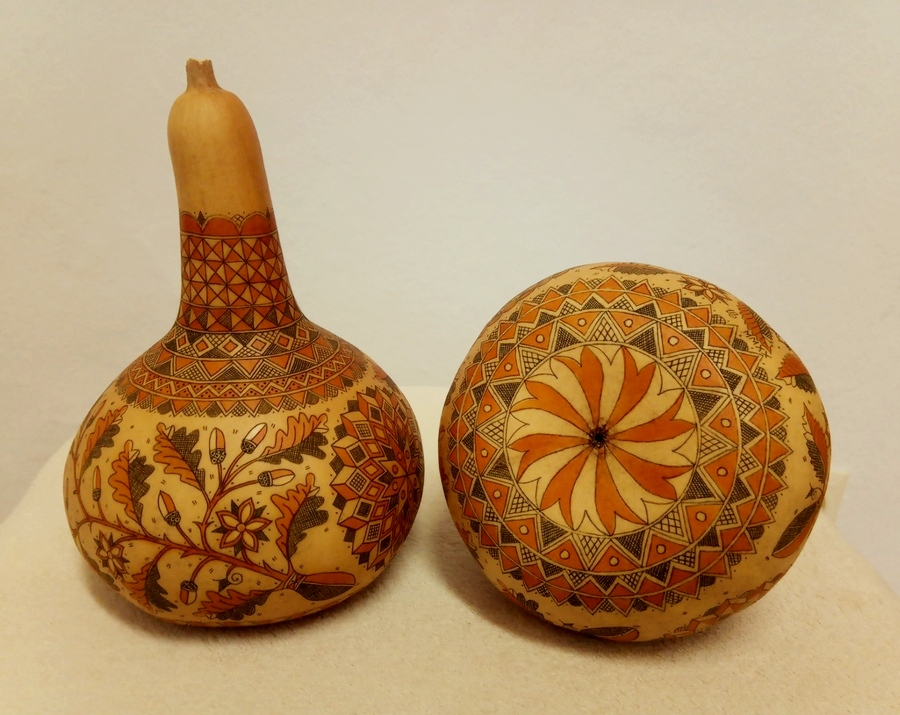
Two ornamental gourds made by Vinko Babić, a folk artist from Gradište, Croatia.
