= Fruit carving =

Art of carving fruit

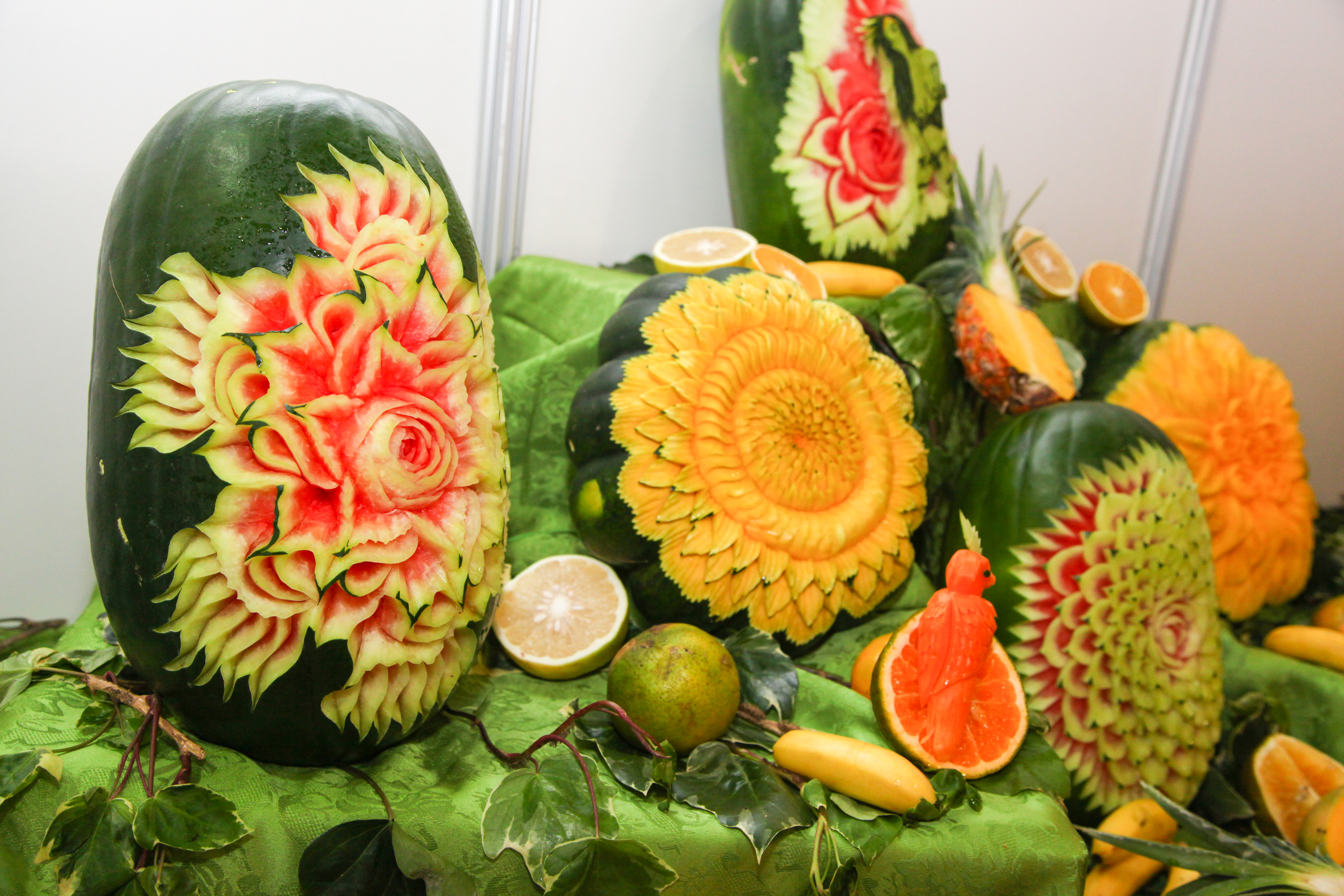
Ecuadorian carved fruit

Fruit carving is the art of carving fruit, a very common technique in Asia and Europe countries, and particularly popular in Thailand, China and Japan. There are many fruits that can be used in this process; the most popular ones that artists use are watermelons, apples, strawberries, pineapples, and cantaloupes.

== History ==
=== China ===
Many believe that fruit carving originated in China during the Tang Dynasty, which lasted from AD 618-906. Fruit carving in China usually features legendary creatures, and animals. Not only is fruit carving used in cultural and traditional ceremonies, but also ordinary households are known for decorating plates with fruit carvings when they have guests over. Specifically, watermelon carving has been and still is very popular in China. Usually, the outside of the melon is carved on and the melon pulp is scraped out of the inside of the melon, so it can be used as a container to put food or flowers in. Chinese fruit carving is used to tell their legends and stories.

=== Europe ===
Fruit carving is included in Matthias Giegher's 1621 work Il Trinciante ("The Carver"), where he describes carving oranges and citrons into abstract patterns, shell-fish, four-legged animals and the Habsburgs' double-headed eagle, but the art was not common in Europe or North America until the 1980s when several books on the topic were published.

=== Thailand ===
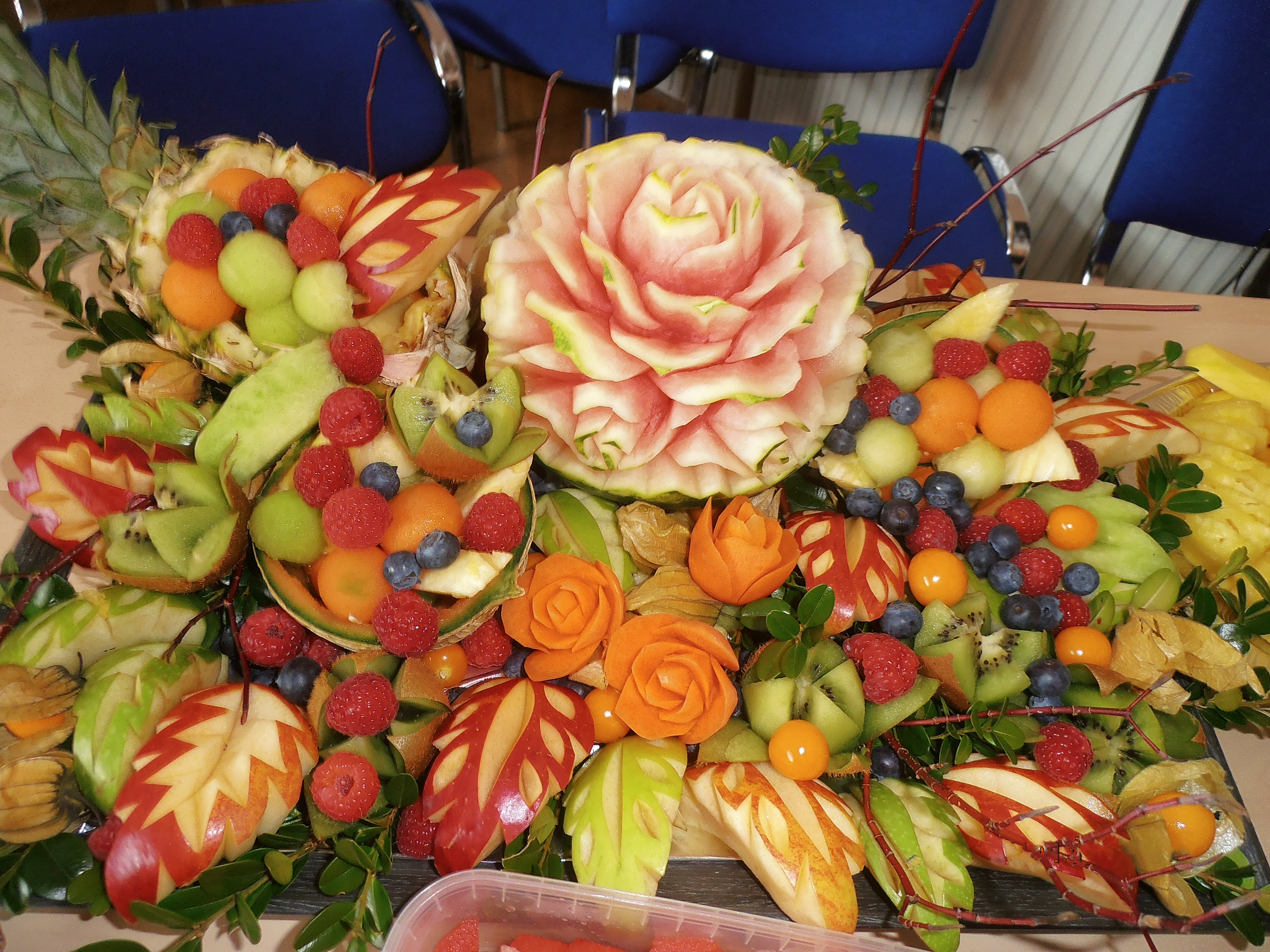
A platter of Thai fruit carvings

Fruit carving is a significant part of Thai cultural heritage. Watermelon carving dates to the 14th century in Thailand during the Sukhothai dynasty. The annual Loi Krathong Festival occurs each November where people in Thailand float lamps and lanterns down a river to honor water spirits. One legend is that one of the king's maids decorated her lantern with a watermelon carved with flower designs to impress him and that he was so pleased that he encouraged all Thai women to adopt the practice. The king also requested that fruit carving become part of the primary school curriculum. Thailand fruit carving features flowers, birds and floral patterns.

=== Japan ===
The Japanese emphasize the presentation of a dish and how the plate aesthetically appeals to others. Fruit carving in Japan is referred to as Mukimono. Mukimono began in ancient Japan in an effort to make dishes more appealing since the food was placed and served on an unglazed pottery plate, which had a rough look to it. Chefs would cover the plate in leaves and would fold them into different designs in order to make the dish look better. This technique eventually turned into carving fruit that would also be placed on the plates to enhance the appearance of the dish. At first, when this technique came out, vendors on the streets would add carved fruit to their food when customers made a special request, but now it is very common for all Japanese dishes to feature carved fruits. Fruit carving and garnishing is now a significant part of Japanese chef training.

== Overview ==
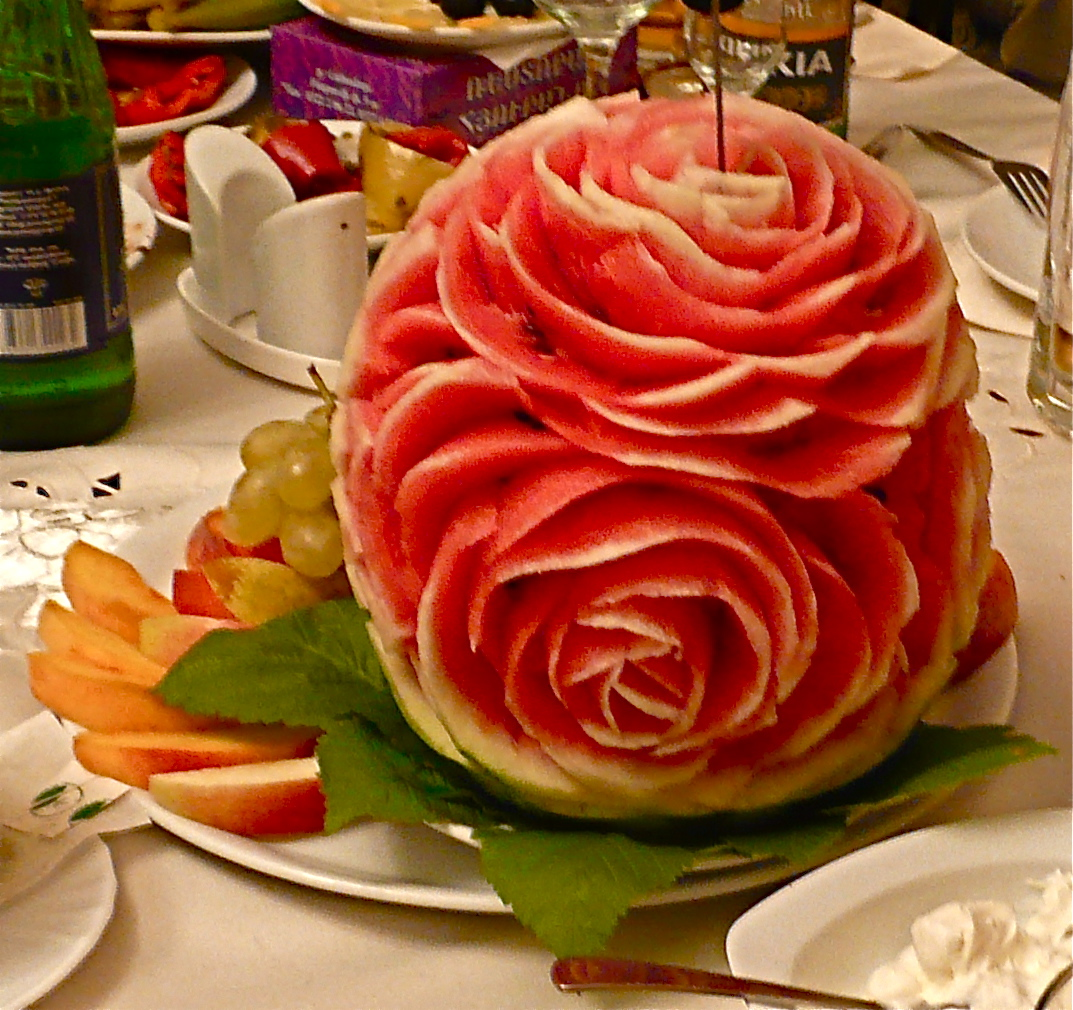
A fruit carving on a watermelon in Armenia

The art of fruit carving uses many different tools, usually ordinary items but some specific to just fruit carving. All these tools give the artwork a different texture or help with its design. Some of the tools include:

- Pen: to draw on the carving one wishes to make
- Carving Knife: most commonly used for giving the carving shape
- Peel Zester: this tool is used to create strips and grooves
- Melon Baller: can be used for a variety of fruit to add ball shaped fruit carvings to the display
- U-shaped garnish tool: used to cut the outer layer of the fruit. This tool is used for fine detailed work. Many fruit carvers use this tool to create petals for a flower shape they are carving.
- V-shaped formed cutter: is used in a similar way as the U-shaped garnish tool but for larger carving ideas.

Before carving a fruit, the necessary materials must be gathered. The usual process is to have the tools handy for when they are needed in one's steps towards creating a carving. There are two types of carvings that can be done. The first is Skin Carving, this is when the outer skin of the fruit (or vegetable) is carved to reveal the fleshy center, where the color is different than the outer skin to create a design using the contrast between the outer skin and flesh of the fruit. The second type of carving is Three Dimensional Carving, the purpose of this particular technique of carving is to carve the fruit into a three dimensional object of the carver's choice. The most popular three dimensional design is floral objects. It is easy to over-carve a fruit which leads to loss in nutrition, but it is always important to start off by outlining your carving on the fruit. Depending on the design that is being created it may take very little time or be more complex and use more time and concentration. Also different steps in the process are used for each design. Not one design is alike. An important aspect of fruit carving is that the fruit you carve must be suitable for the manner which one will display it. Most fruit carvings will need to be refrigerated before they are placed in the specific setting that is desired.

== Fruit carving today ==
Some people perform fruit carving professionally. Some chefs utilize fruit carving as a culinary technique. Once fruit carvers have mastered the techniques past the intermediate stage and become professionals, they can price their services to restaurants, professional caterers, hotels and resorts. Professional fruit carvers can also create centerpieces and displays for various events, such as parties and weddings receptions. On a smaller scale, fruit carvers can present a dish with decorative garnishing to add an aesthetically pleasing experience to their viewers.

== See also ==
- Fruit pit carving
- Mukimono – the traditional Japanese art of decorative garnishing
- Vegetable carving
