= Vegetable carving =

Art form

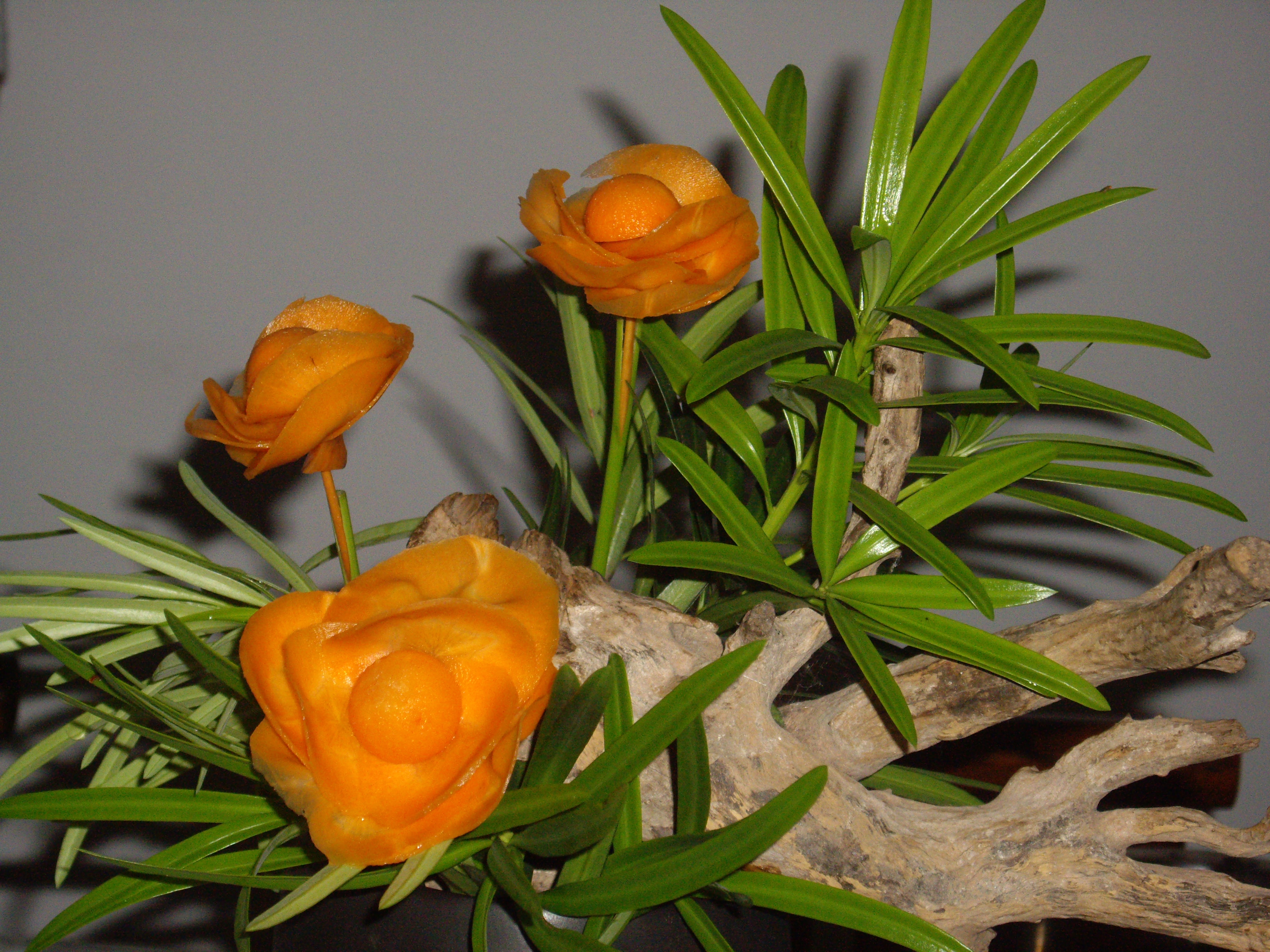
Carrot poppy arrangement

Vegetable carving is the art of carving vegetables into other objects, such as flowers and birds.

== The origins of vegetable carving ==
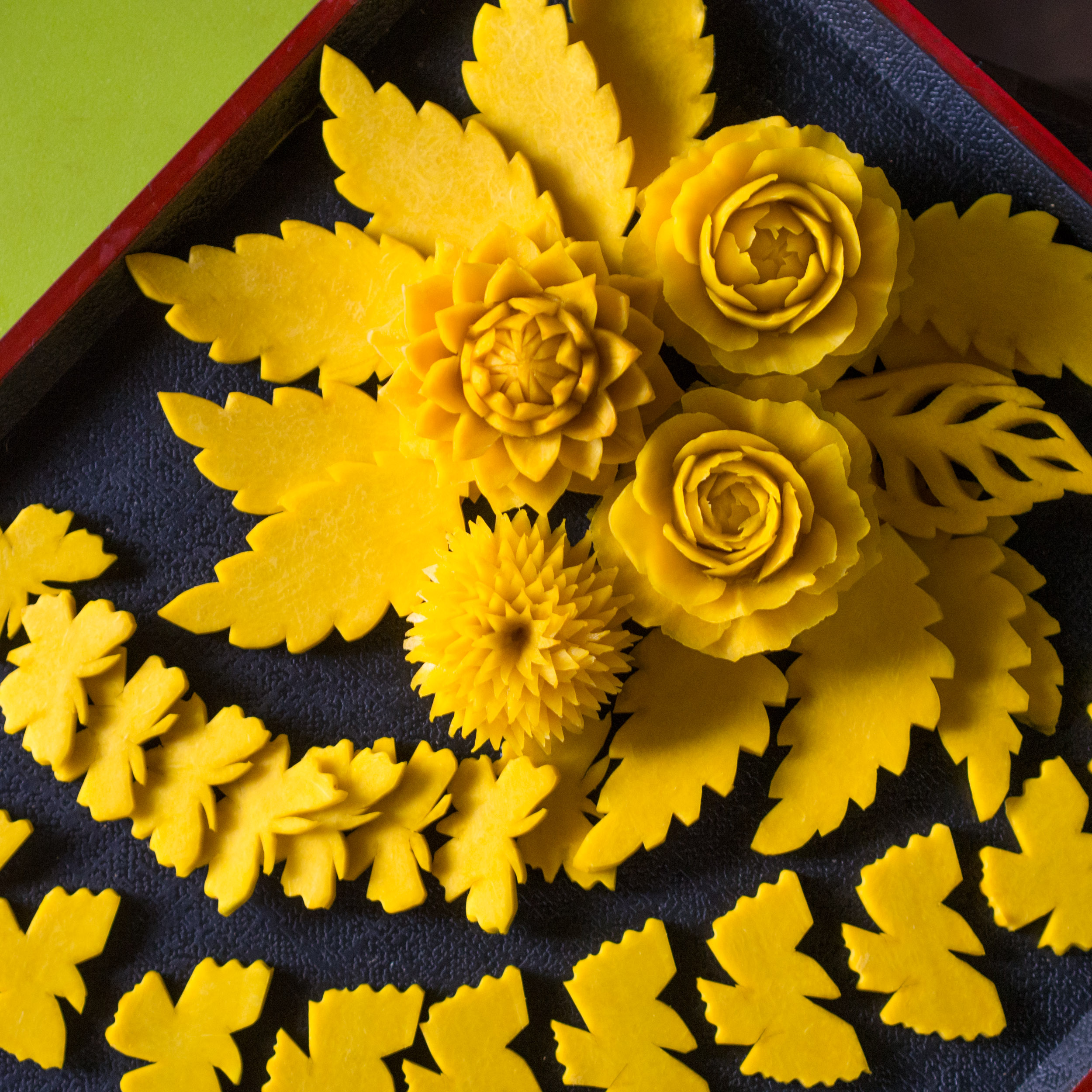
Vegetable carving in Thailand

The origins of vegetable carving are disputed: it may have begun in ancient Japan; in Sukothai, Thailand; or in the time of the Tang dynasty (AD 618–906) or Song dynasty (AD 960–1279) in China.

=== Japan ===
Japan may have been the root of the art of fruit and vegetable carving, called Mukimono in Japanese. According to the book Japanese Garnishes: The Ancient Art of Mukimono, by Yukiko and Bob Haydok, Mukimono began in ancient times when food was served on unglazed clay pottery. These rough platters were covered with a leaf before food was plated. Artistic chefs realized that cutting or folding the leaf in different ways created a more attractive presentation. Mukimono did not become popular until the 16th century, the Edo period, when it gained official recognition. At that time, street artists created clever garnishes upon request. From these beginnings, the art developed into an important part of every Japanese chef's training.

=== Thailand ===
Vegetable and fruit carving may have originated in Thailand during the Loi Krathong festival in the 14th century. During Loi Krathong, rafts are decorated with many objects, including banana leaves and flowers. In 1364, one of King Phra Ruang's servants, Nang Noppamart, wanted to create a unique decoration for her raft. Nang carved a flower from a vegetable, using a real flower as a pattern. She carved a bird as well and set it beside the flower. Using these carvings, she created a raft that stood out above the rest. King Phra Ruang was impressed by the grace and beauty of the carving and decreed that every woman should learn this new art. In central Thailand, people used banana stalks to decorate biers. Artists carved the stalks in an art form called Thaeng yuak.

As the centuries passed, enthusiasm for vegetable carving waxed and waned. King Rama II loved vegetable carving so much that he wrote poetry about it in 1808. However, during the Siamese revolution of 1932, appreciation for vegetable carving died down. To revive interest, it is taught to students in Thailand, from those as young as 11 in primary school to those in secondary school. Optional courses are also offered in universities throughout Thailand.

== Musical vegetables ==
Vegetables can be carved into musical instruments. Musical groups such as The Vegetable Orchestra, the London Vegetable Orchestra and the Long Island Vegetable Orchestra do this and perform with them in a variety of ways. Vegetables carved by the LVO include carrot recorders, butternut squash trombones, pumpkin drums and aubergine castanets.

== Vegetable carving today ==
Regardless of its origins, vegetable carving is flaunted in many Asian restaurants, cruises, hotels, and other places. In the mid-20th century, the art of vegetable carving began to grow outside Asia. Other cultures gradually began to appreciate the beauty associated with the practice. Today, vegetable carving occurs throughout the world.

The products of vegetable carving are generally flowers and birds; however, many other shapes are possible. Carving techniques vary. Some carvings present much artistic detail, while others have simple yet beautiful shapes. Carved vegetables are generally used as garnishes but can also be arranged into bouquets.

== See also ==
- Fruit carving
- Pumpkin carving
- Thaeng yuak
